= Meril-Prothom Alo Awards =

Annual Bangladeshi Awards Ceremony

- Current: 24th Meril Prothom Alo Awards
- Awarded for: Excellence in cinematic achievements
- Country: Bangladesh
- Presented by: Prothom Alo
- First award: 1998
- Final award: 2026
- Website: prothomalo.com/mpaward/

The Meril-Prothom Alo Awards, or simply Prothom Alo Awards, is an annual Bangladeshi awards ceremony honouring cinematic achievements in Bangladeshi Film Industry. The awards are divided into two components, Viewers' Choice and Critics' Choice. The awards were first presented in 1998 and since then the awards are given every year at the Bangladesh China Friendship Conference Center.

Meril-Prothom Alo Awards receive the highest number of viewers among Bangladesh's awards ceremonies. The awards are considered Bangladeshi equivalent to The Oscars.

== History ==
Meril Prothom Alo Awards were first awarded in 1998. The awards ceremony was organised and held by Bangladesh's largest newspaper Daily Prothom Alo and Meril of Square Toiletries Limited. After the construction of BCFICC in 2002, the awards ceremony was moved to a new location and in 2002, the awards ceremony for the first time was held in front of a large audience. The awards include nominations in more than 30 categories and 2 honorary awards (includes lifetime achievements award).

== Nomination ==
Meril Prothom Alo Awards is divided into two different nomination processes, the Viewers Choice Awards nominations are made based on votes received from audiences and viewers while the jury nominations are selected by the board members (consist of veteran Bangladeshi directors, actors, actresses and producers, and other film personalities).

=== Voters ===
The Meril Prothom Alo Awards (MPAA) committee, consists of several selected members' votes on selecting the nominees for each award category. All voters have to be certified by The Prothom Alo Corporation. After the nominees are shortlisted, the nominations are made available to public and they can vote for any of the nominees.

=== Board members ===
The board members (known as the Juries) decide the nominations and winners of Critics Choice Awards, which also include honorary awards. The Critics Choice Awards are given in 10 categories. The board, often consists of 8–10 members.

- 1999
- Best Movie Actor - Male
- Movie Actor - Male
- Manna - (Ammajan)
- Riaz
- Ferdous
- Best Movie Actor - Female
- Shabnur (Ei Mon Tomake Dilam)
- Moushumi
- Poppy
- Best Singer - Male
- Andrew Kishore (Brindamon)
- Ayub Bacchu
- Tapan Chowdhury
- Best Singer - Female
- Kanak Chapa (Eto Shundor Prithibi)
- Runa Laila
- Sabina Yasmin
- Best Model - Male
- Nobel (TVC)
- Pollob
- Shimul
- Best Model - Female
- Sadia Islam Mou (TVC)
- Tarin
- Riya
- Best TV Commercial
- Keya Super Lemon Soap
- Berger Paints
- Meril Beauty Care Soap
- Best Magazine TV Show
- Ityadi (Hanif Sanket)
- Flop Show
- Shubheccha
- Best Music Band
- LRB
- Ark
- Nagar Baul
- Best TV Actor - Female
- Bipasha Hayat
- Shomy Kayser
- Afsana Mimi
- Best TV Actor - Male
- Zahid Hasan
- Azizul Hakim
- Tauquir Ahmed
- Best TV Natok Story
- Abul Hayat (Unmesh)
- Giasuddin Selim (Dokkhiner Ghor)
- Panna Kayser (Kahini)
- Masum Aziz (Ontore Nirontor)
- Best TV Natok Director
- Syedul Anam Tutul (Dokkiner Ghor)
- Abul Hayat (Unmesh)
- Sheikh Niyamat Ali (Vorer Kotha Mala)
- Best TV Natok Actor - Male
- Masud Ali Khan (Vorer Kotha Mala)
- Shahiduzzaman Selim (Adhuli)
- Jayanto Chattopadhyay (Dokkhiner Ghor)
- Best TV Natok Actor - Female
- Rokeya Prachi (Chor)
- Tania Ahmed (Dokkhiner Ghor)
- Natasha Hayat (Unmesh)
- 2000
- Best Movie Actor - Male
- Manna (Abbajan)
- Riaz
- Ferdous
- Best Movie Actor - Female
- Shabnur (Mrittu Geet Shomriddho)
- Poppy
- Moushumi
- Best Model - Female
- Sadia Islam Mou (Apon Jewellers TVC)
- Riya
- Tarin
- Best Model - Male
- Nobel (TVC)
- Pollob
- Shahed
- Best Magazine TV Show
- Ityadi (Hanif Sanket)
- Shubeccha
- Aajkaal
- Best TV Actor - Female
- Shomy Kayser
- Afsana Mimi
- Bipasha Hayat
- Best TV Actor - Male
- Zahid Hasan
- Azizul Hakim
- Tauquir Ahmed
- 2001
- Best Singer - Male
- Asif Akbar (O Priya Tumi Kothay)
- Andrew Kishore (Poddo Patar Pani)
- Jens Sumon (Ekta Chador Hobe)
- Hasan (Taal)
- Best Singer - Female
- Kanak Chapa (Shagorer Moto Gobhir)
- Kaniz Suborna (Bhalobashi Tomake)
- Momtaz (Return Ticket)
- Samina Chowdhury (Shaat Bhai Chompa)
- Best Model - Male
- Noble (Keya TVC)
- James (Pepsi TVC)
- Shimul (Berger TVC)
- Shahed (Lubaba TVC)
- Best Model - Female
- Sadia Islam Mou (Keya Herbal TVC)
- Aupee Karim (Lux TVC)
- Purnima (Lux TVC)
- Riya (Renus Jewellers TVC)
- Best Movie Actor - Male
- Riaz (Shoshurbari Zindabad)
- Mahfuz (Dui Duari)
- Manna (Abbajan)
- Ferdous
- Best Movie Actor - Female
- Shabnur (Shoshrbari Zindabad)
- Meher Afroze Shaon (Dui Duari)
- Purnima
- Moushumi
- Best Band
- LRB (Mon Chaile Mon Pabe)
- Ark (Brihoshpoti)
- Baul Nogor (Dushtu Cheler Dol)
- Promithius (Shoreo Shoreya)
- Best Magazine TV Show
- Ittadi (Hanif Sanket)
- Poriprekkhon
- Bolte Chai
- Shubheccha
- Best TV Actor - Male
- Zahid Hasan
- Azizul Hakim
- Afzal Hossain
- Tauquir Ahmed
- Best TV Actor - Female
- Shomi Kayser
- Tarin
- Afsana Mimi
- Bipasha Hayat

== Awards ==
=== Public Choice Awards ===
- Best Playback Male Singer
- Best Playback Female Singer
- Best TV Actor
- Best TV Actress
- Best Film Actor
- Best Film Actress
- Best Newcomer (Film and Television)
- Best Musical Band
- Best Male Model
- Best Female Model

Best Film Actor	Best TV Actor
1998 - Riaz; 1999 -Manna; 2000 -Manna; 2001 -Riaz (Shoshurbari Zindabad); 2002 -Riaz (O Priya Tumi Kothay); 2003 -Riaz (Moner Majhe Tumi); 2004 -Ferdous (Bachelor); 2005 -ATM Shamsuzzaman (Molla Barir Bou); 2006 -Riaz (Hridoyer Kotha); 2007 - Manna (Machineman); 2008 - Shakib Khan (Priya Amar Priya); 2009 - Chanchal Chowdhury (Monpura); 2010 - Shakib Khan (Bhalobaslei Ghor Bandha Jay Na); 2011 - Shakib Khan ( King Khan); 2012 - Shakib Khan (Don Number One); 2013 - Shakib Khan (Purno Doirgho Prem Kahini); 2014 - Shakib Khan (Hero: The Superstar); 2015 - Arifin Shuvoo (Chuye Dile Mon); 2016 - Shakib Khan ( Shikari); 2017 - Arifin Shuvoo (Dhaka Attack); 2018 - Siam Ahmed (PoraMon 2); 2019 - Siam Ahmed (Fagun Haway); 2021 - Siam Ahmed (Mridha Bonam Mridha); 2022 - Chanchal Chowdhury (Hawa (2022 Bangladeshi film)); 2023 - Afran Nisho (Surongo); 2024 - Shakib Khan (Toofan (2024 film))	1998 – Zahid Hasan; 1999 – Zahid Hasan; 2000 – Zahid Hasan; 2001 – Zahid Hasan (Nilanjana); 2002 – Zahid Hasan (Bandhan); 2003 – Mahfuz Ahmed; 2004 – Mahfuz Ahmed (Nurul Huda Ekoda Valobeshechilo); 2005 – Mahfuz Ahmed (Otopor Nurul Huda); 2006 – Mahfuz Ahmed (Otopor Nurul Huda); 2007 – Zahid Hasan; 2008 – Mahfuz Ahmed (Amader Nurul Huda); 2009 – Mosharraf Karim (Housefull); 2010 – Zahid Hasan (Graduate); 2011 – Mosharraf Karim (Chander Nijer Kono Alo Nei); 2012 – Zahid Hasan (Arman Bhai Honeymoon e); 2013 – Mosharraf Karim (Sikandar Box Ekhon Birat Model); 2014 – Mosharraf Karim (Sei Rokom Pan-Khor); 2015 – Mosharraf Karim – (Sikandar Box Ekhon Nijer Grame); 2016 - Mosharraf Karim (Bougiri); 2017 – Ziaul Faruq Apurba – (Boro Chele); 2018 - Afran Nisho (Buker Ba Pashe); 2019 - Afran Nisho (Sheshta Sundor); 2021 - Afran Nisho (Punorjonmo); 2022 - Afran Nisho (Punorjonmo 3); 2023 - Afran Nisho (Punorjonmo: Antim Porbo); 2024 - Tawsif Mahbub (Love Sab); 2025 - Farhan Ahmed Jovan (Tomader Golpo)
Best Singer (Male)	Best Singer (Female)
1998 – Tapan Chowdhury; 1999 – Andrew Kishore; 2000 – Andrew Kishore; 2001 – Asif Akbar (O Priya Tumi Kothay); 2002 – Asif Akbar; 2003 – Asif Akbar; 2004 – Asif Akbar; 2005 – Asif Akbar (Bachbo Na); 2006 – Habib Wahid (Bhalobashbo Bashbore – Hridoyer Kotha); 2007 – Balam (Balam); 2008 – Habib Wahid (Bolchi Tomake); 2009 – Habib Wahid (Dwidha – Third Person Singular Number); 2010 – Habib Wahid (Projapoti – Projapoti); 2011 – Arfin Rumey (Nilanjona); 2012 – Habib Wahid (Shadin); 2013 – Asif Akbar (Ex-Prem); 2014 – James (musician); 2015 – Tahsan Rahman Khan (Chuye Dile Mon – Chuye Dile Mon); 2016 – Imran Mahmudul; 2017 – James (musician); 2018 – Imran Mahmudul; 2019 – Imran Mahmudul; 2021 – Tanveer Evan; 2022 – Arfan Mredha Shiblu; 2023 – Imran Mahmudul; 2024 – Pritom Hasan	1998 – Kanak Chapa; 1999 – Kanak Chapa; 2000 – Kanak Chapa; 2001 – Kanak Chapa; 2002 – Kanak Chapa; 2003 – Momtaz Begum; 2004 – Dolly Shantoni; 2005 – Samina Chowdhury (Ei Bujhi Tumi Ele); 2006 – Samina Chowdhury (Amar Majhe Nei – Rani Kuthir Baki Itihash); 2007 – Fahmida Nabi (Lukuchuri Lukuchuri Golpo – Aha!); 2008 – Kazi Krishnokoli Islam (Jao Pakhi – Monpura); 2009 – Nazmun Munira Nancy (Dwidha – Third Person Singular Number); 2010 – Nazmun Munira Nancy (Shishir Bheja); 2011 – Nazmun Munira Nancy (Pagol Tor Jonno); 2012 – Nazmun Munira Nancy (Bhalobasi Tomay); 2013 – Nazmun Munira Nancy (Akash Hote Chai); 2014 – Nazmun Munira Nancy (Bhalo Na Basle Ki Bojha Jay); 2015 – Nazmun Munira Nancy (Dana Kata Pori); 2016 – Dilshad Nahar Kona; 2017 – Momtaz Begum; 2018 – Dilshad Nahar Kona; 2019 – Dilshad Nahar Kona; 2021 – Abanti Sithi; 2022 – Atiya Anisha; 2023 – Abanti Sithi; 2024 – Dilshad Nahar Kona
Best Newcomer (Film and Television)	Best Musical Band
2014 – Tanjin Tisha (U-turn); 2015 – Nusraat Faria (Aashiqui); 2016 – Shabnom Bubly (Bossgiri); 2017 - Taskin Rahman (Dhaka Attack); 2018 - Sabnam Faria (Debi); 2019 - Orchita Sporshia (Abar Boshonto); 2021 - Jannatul Ferdous Oishee (Mission Extreme); 2022 - Rodela Tapur (Deshantor); 2023 - Naznin Nahar Niha (Love Semester); 2024 - Farrukh Ahmed Rehan (Jugol)	
Best Male Model	Best Female Model
1998 – Adil Hossain Nobel; 1999 – Adil Hossain Nobel; 2000 – Adil Hossain Nobel; 2001 – Adil Hossain Nobel; 2002 - Sabbir Ahmed; 2003 – Adil Hossain Nobel; 2004 – Adil Hossain Nobel; 2005 – Chanchal Chowdhury (Grameen Phone); 2006 – Kazi Jamal Uddin (Asian City); 2007 – Mamnun Hasan Emon (Banglalink Desh To Desh)	1998 – Sadia Islam Mou; 1999 – Sadia Islam Mou; 2000 – Sadia Islam Mou; 2001 – Sadia Islam Mou; 2002 – Mozeza Ashraf Monalisa; 2003 – Nusrat Imroz Tisha; 2004 – Nusrat Imroz Tisha; 2005 – Prarthona Fardin Dighi (Grameen Phone – Moyna Pakhi); 2006 – Prarthona Fardin Dighi (Elite Ranga Mehedi); 2007 – Mozeza Ashraf Monalisa (Banglalink Desh To Desh)

=== Critics' Choice Awards ===
- Best Film
- Best Film Director
- Best Film Actor
- Best Film Actress
- Best Play Writer
- Best TV Director
- Best TV Actor
- Best TV Actress
- Special Awards

Best Film Actor	Best TV Actor
1998 –; 1999 –; 2000 –; 2001 –; 2002 –; 2003 – Riaz; 2004 – Riaz (Shasti: Punishment); 2005 – Riaz (Hajar Bachhor Dhore); 2006 – Chanchal Chowdhury (Rupkothar Golpo); 2007 – Shakib Khan (Amar Praner Swami); 2008 – Raisul Islam Asad (Liliputera Boro Hobe); 2009 – Mamunur Rashid (Monpura); 2010 – Jayanta Chattopadhyay (Opekkha) and Chanchal Chowdhury (Moner Manush); 2011 – Chowdhury Jawata Afnan (Amar Bondhu Rashed); 2012 – Tariq Anam Khan (Ghetuputra Kamola); 2013 – Raisul Islam Asad (Mrittika Maya) and Rakhal Sobuj (Shikhandi Kotha); 2014 – Arifin Shuvoo (Taarkata); 2015 - Arifin Shuvoo (Chuye Dile Mon); 2016 - Chanchal Chowdhury (Aynabaji); 2017 - Arifin Shuvoo (Dhaka Attack)	1998 –; 1999 –; 2000 –; 2001 –; 2002 –; 2003 – Fazlur Rahman Babu; 2004 –; 2005 – Aly Zaker; 2006 – Anisur Rahman Milon (Modhu Moyra); 2007 – SM Mohsin (Gorom Bhat Othoba Nichok Bhuter Golpo); 2008 – Mosharraf Karim (Deyal Almari); 2009 – Fazlur Rahman Babu (Panjabiwala); 2010 – Shahiduzzaman Selim (Kaata); 2011 – Abul Hayat (Shonibar Raat Doshta Chollish Minute); 2012 – Mosharraf Karim (Jorda Jamal); 2013 – Mosharraf Karim (Sei Rokom Cha-Khor); 2014 – Rawnak Hasan (Ratargul); 2015 -; 2016 -; 2017 -
Best Playwright	Best TV Director
1998 –; 1999 –; 2000 –; 2001 – Ratan Paul; 2002 – Nurul Alam Atique; 2003 – Gias Uddin Selim; 2004 –; 2005 – Muhammed Zafar Iqbal (Ekti Shundor Shokal); 2006 – Masum Reza (Modhu Moyra); 2007 – Litu Shakhawat (Fera); 2008 – Nurul Alam Atique and Ranjan Rabbani (Ekti Phone Kora Jabe Please?); 2009 – Nurul Alam Atique (Bikol Pakhir Gaan); 2010 – Iftekhar Ahmed Fahmi (Celluloid Man); 2011 – Ashraful Chanchal (Shonibar Raat Doshta Chollish Minute); 2012 – Abul Kalam Azad (Sobuj Velvet); 2013 – Partho Shahriar (Jong Kutumbpur); 2014 – Monirul Islam Rubel (Protidin Shonibar); 2015 -; 2016 – Sarower Reza Jimi (Jog Biyog)	1998 –; 1999 – Saidul Anam Tutul (Dokkhiner Ghor); 2000 – Mostafa Sarwar Farooki (Prottyaborton); 2001 – Gias Uddin Selim (Paap Punno); 2002 – Nurul Alam Atique (Choturtho Matra); 2003 – Nurul Alam Atique (Cycle er Dana); 2004 – Animesh Aich (Kufa); 2005 – Abdullah Rana (Ghorsawarer Swapno); 2006 – Mejbaur Rahman Sumon (Dhokhiner Janalata Khola); 2007 – Animesh Aich (Gorom Bhat Othoba Nichok Bhuter Golpo); 2008 – Amitabh Reza (Ekti Phone Kora Jabe Please?); 2009 – Nurul Alam Atique (Bikol Pakhir Gaan); 2010 – Animesh Aich (Kaata); 2011 – Monowar Kabir (Holud); 2012 – Animesh Aich (Noytar Songbad); 2013 – Wahid Anam (Pari); 2014 – Amitabh Reza (Surface); 2015 -; 2016 -

=== Special awards ===
Meril-Prothom Alo Lifetime Achievement Award since 2002

- 1998
- 1999 –
- 2000 –
- 2001 –
- 2002 –
- 2003 – Ahmed Rubel (Adhiar); Best Producer: Saidul Anam Tutul (Adhiar); and Best Playwright: Mustafa Manwar
- 2004 –
- 2005 – Best Dancer: Shibli Muhammad; and Best Singer: Monir Khan
- 2006 – Best Cinematography (TV): Monirul Islam Masud; Best Cinematography (Film): Maqsudul Bari; Best Dancer: Munmun Ahmed; and Best Singer: Kumar Bishwajit (Drishti Bhora Brishti)
- 2007 – Fazlur Rahman Babu (Swopnodanay); Best Dancer: Shamim Ara Nipa; and Best Singer: Bappa Mazumder (Din Bari Jay)
- 2008 – Best Film: SA Haque Alik (Akash Chhoa Bhalobasa); Best Dancer: Sharmila Bandopadhay; and Best Singer: Deepto (Ekti Sorol Onko)
- 2009 – Topu (Third Person Singular Number)
- 2010 –
- 2011 – A.T.M. Shamsuzzaman (Guerilla)
- 2012 – Mamun (Ghetuputra Kamola) and Meghla (Uttarer Sur)
- 2013 –
- 2014 – Best Director: Wahid Anam (Chinno); Best Make-up Artist: Mohammad Faruq (Brihonnola)

=== Discontinued categories ===
Best TV Program

- 1998 – Ittyadi
- 1999 – Ittyadi
- 2000 – Ittyadi
- 2001 – Ittyadi
- 2002 – Ittyadi
- 2003 – Ittyadi
- 2004 – Ittyadi
- 2005 – Ittyadi

== Records ==
=== Most awards ===
- Shabnur- 10 (10 Popular Best Film Actress)
- Nusrat Imroz Tisha – 10 (6x Popular Best TV Actress, 1x Critics' Best Film Actress, 1x Critics' Best TV Actress, 2x Best Female Model)
- Mosharraf Karim – 9 (6x Popular Best TV Actor, 3x Critics' Best TV Actor)
- Riaz – 8 (5x Popular Best Film Actor, 3x Critics' Best Film Actor)
- Zahid Hasan – 8 (8x Popular Best TV Actor)
- Shakib Khan – 8 (7x Popular Best Film Actor, 1x Critics' Best Film Actor)

=== Most acting awards ===
Male:

- Mosharraf Karim – 9 (6x Popular Best TV Actor, 3x Critics' Best TV Actor)
- Riaz – 8 (5x Popular Best Film Actor, 3x Critics' Best Film Actor)
- Zahid Hasan – 8 (8x Popular Best TV Actor)
- Shakib Khan – 8 (7x Popular Best Film Actor, 1x Critics' Best Film Actor)

Female:

- Shabnur – 10 ( 10 Popular Best Film Actress)
- Nusrat Imroz Tisha – 8 (6x Popular Best TV Actress, 1x Critics' Best Film Actress, 1x Critics' Best TV Actress)

=== Most music awards ===
Male:

- Asif Akbar – 6 (6x Best Male Singer)
- Habib Wahid – 5 (5x Best Male Singer)

Female:

- Nancy – 7 (7x Best Female Singer)
- Kanak Chapa – 4 (4x Best Female Singer)

=== Most directing awards ===
- Animesh Aich – 4 (4x Best TV Director)

=== Most film awards ===
Male:

- Riaz – 8 (5x Popular Best Film Actor, 3x Critics' Best Film Actor)
- Shakib Khan – 8 (7x Popular Best Film Actor, 1x Critics' Best Film Actor)

Female:

- Shabnur – 10 (10 Popular Best Film Actress)

=== Most TV awards ===
Male:

- Mosharraf Karim – 9 (6x Popular Best TV Actor, 3x Critics' Best TV Actor)
- Zahid Hasan – 8 (8x Popular Best TV Actor)

Female:

- Nusrat Imroz Tisha – 7 (6x Popular Best TV Actress, 1x Critics' Best TV Actress)

=== Most modelling awards ===
Male:

- Adil Hossain Nobel – 6 (6x Best Male Model)

Female:

- Sadia Islam Mou – 4 (4x Best Female Model)

=== Most nominations ===
Female:

- Shabnur- 13 (for Best Popular Film Actress)

== Awards ceremonies ==
The following is a listing of all Meril Prothom Alo Awards ceremonies since 1998.

Ceremony	Date	Host(s)	Venue	Source
1st Meril-Prothom Alo Awards	1999	Afzal Hossain and Suborna Mustafa		
2nd Meril-Prothom Alo Awards	2000	Hanif Sanket		
3rd Meril-Prothom Alo Awards	2001	Afzal Hossain and Suborna Mustafa		
4th Meril-Prothom Alo Awards	2002	Hanif Sanket		
5th Meril-Prothom Alo Awards	2003	Afzal Hossain		
6th Meril-Prothom Alo Awards	2004	Hanif Sanket	Bangladesh-China Friendship International Conference Center, Dhaka	
7th Meril-Prothom Alo Awards	2005	Hanif Sanket	Bangladesh-China Friendship International Conference Center, Dhaka	
8th Meril-Prothom Alo Awards	12 May 2006	Hanif Sanket	Bangladesh-China Friendship International Conference Center, Dhaka	
9th Meril-Prothom Alo Awards	2007	Afzal Hossain	Bangladesh-China Friendship International Conference Center, Dhaka	
10th Meril-Prothom Alo Awards	2008	Ferdous Ahmed and Riaz	Bangladesh-China Friendship International Conference Center, Dhaka	
11th Meril-Prothom Alo Awards	10 April 2009	Ferdous Ahmed and Aupee Karim	Hall of Fame Theatre, Bangabandhu International Conference Center, Dhaka	
12th Meril-Prothom Alo Awards	9 April 2010	Ferdous Ahmed, Chanchal Chowdhury and Mosharraf Karim	Hall of Fame Theatre, Bangabandhu International Conference Center, Dhaka	
13th Meril-Prothom Alo Awards	29 April 2011	Zahid Hasan	Hall of Fame Theatre, Bangabandhu International Conference Center, Dhaka	
14th Meril-Prothom Alo Awards	26 April 2012	Mosharraf Karim, Chanchal Chowdhury and Nusrat Imrose Tisha	Hall of Fame Theatre, Bangabandhu International Conference Center, Dhaka	
15th Meril-Prothom Alo Awards	25 April 2013	Mosharraf Karim, Chanchal Chowdhury	Hall of Fame Theatre, Bangabandhu International Conference Center, Dhaka	
16th Meril-Prothom Alo Awards	25 April 2014	Jewel Aich, Saju Khadem	Hall of Fame Theatre, Bangabandhu International Conference Center, Dhaka	
17th Meril-Prothom Alo Awards	8 May 2015	Mosharraf Karim, Nusrat Imrose Tisha, Saju Khadem	Hall of Fame Theatre, Bangabandhu International Conference Center, Dhaka	
18th Meril-Prothom Alo Awards	28 April 2016	Tahsan Rahman Khan	Hall of Fame Theatre, Bangabandhu International Conference Center, Dhaka	
19th Meril-Prothom Alo Awards	21 April 2017	Ferdous Ahmed and Purnima	Hall of Fame Theatre, Bangabandhu International Conference Center, Dhaka	

== Controversy ==
The awards have come under criticism from various sections of the society for being held during a time of national crisis. Ignoring public outcry on social networks, the organizers went ahead with the ceremony which was held at the Bangabandhu International Convention Centre in Dhaka on 26 April 2013, as the entire country mourned the demise of more than 1136 people in the collapse of a building at Savar.

== See also ==
- National Film Awards (Bangladesh)
- Ifad Film Club Award
- Babisas Award
- Channel i Music Awards
