= Meril-Prothom Alo Award for Best Film Actor =

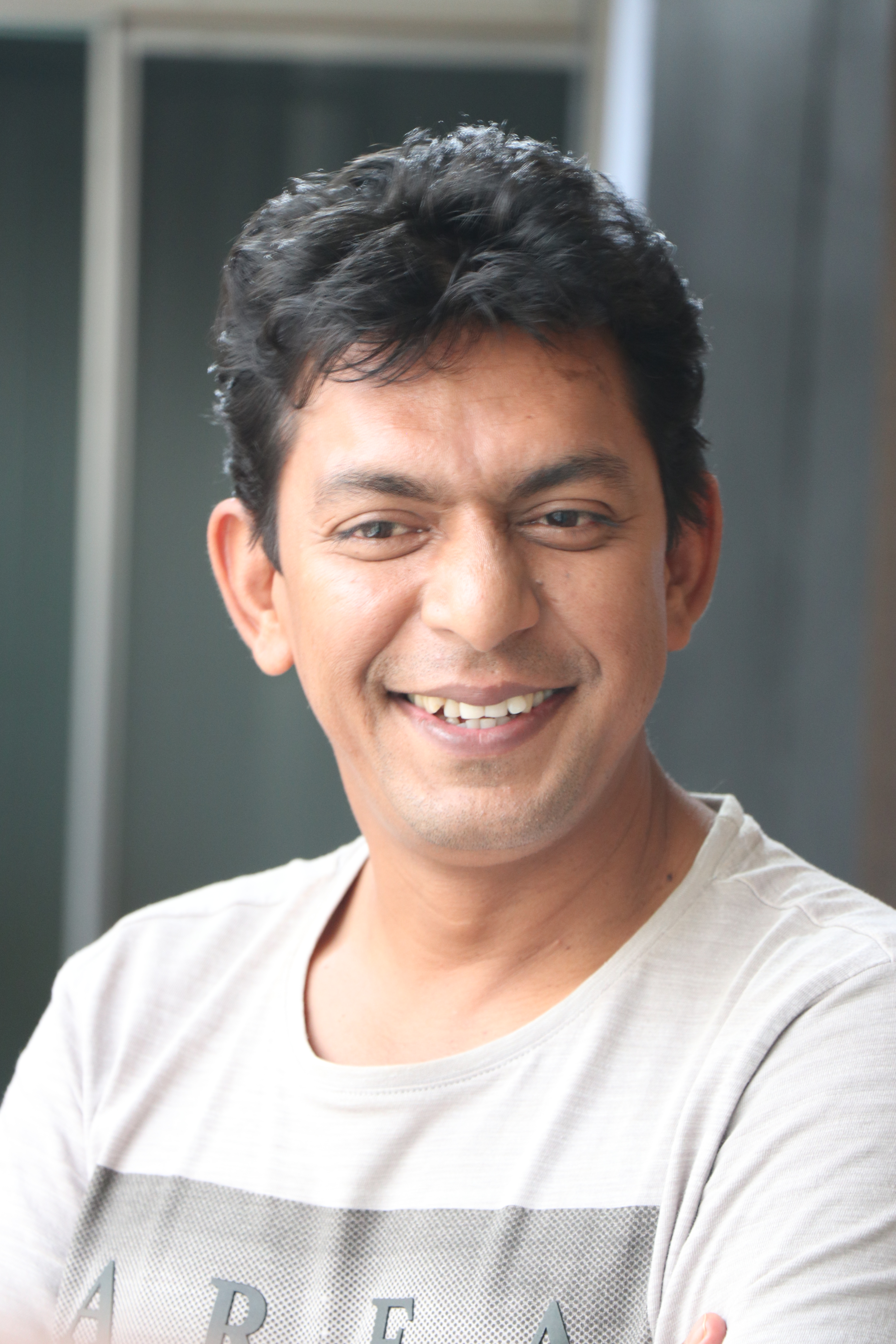
- The 2022 recipient: Chanchal Chowdhury
- Awarded for: Best Performance by an Actor in a Leading Role
- Country: Bangladesh
- Presented by: Meril–Prothom Alo
- First award: Riaz (1998)
- Currently held by: Chanchal Chowdhury, Hawa (2022)

Highlights
- Most awards: Shakib Khan (8)
- Most nominations: Shakib Khan (18)
- Website: Official Website

The Meril-Prothom Alo Award for Best Film Actor is an award jointly presented by Meril and Prothom Alo in recognition of the contribution of Bangladeshi film actors. The award was first presented in 1999 as part of the Meril-Prothom Alo Awards for a 1998 film.

Riaz won the award for the first time in this category. Shakib Khan won this award for a record eight times, including five times in a row from 2011 to 2015. Riaz has also come second five times, followed by Manna three times and Arifin Shuvoo twice. The latest winner is Chanchal Chowdhury won the award for his performance in the Hawa (2022).

== Multiple wins ==
The following actors have won two or more times:

Won	Actor(s)	Nominations
8	Shakib Khan	18
5	Riaz	13
3	Manna	9
3	Siam Ahmed	3
2	Arifin Shuvoo	8
2	Chanchal Chowdhury	5

== Multiple nominations ==
The following actors received two or more nominations:

Nomination	Actor(s)
18	Shakib Khan
13	Ferdous Ahmed
13	Riaz
9	Manna
8	Arifin Shuvoo
5	Chanchal Chowdhury
5	Mosharraf Karim
3	Ananta Jalil
3	Zahid Hasan
3	Mamnun Hasan Emon
3	Mahfuz Ahmed
3	Siam Ahmed
2	Kazi Maruf

== Winners and nominees ==
The first titles in the list below indicate the winners. Winning actors' names are in bold and those not in bold indicate nominations. The years given in the list are considered to be the year of release of the film and not the year of the award. The awards are usually held in the following year.

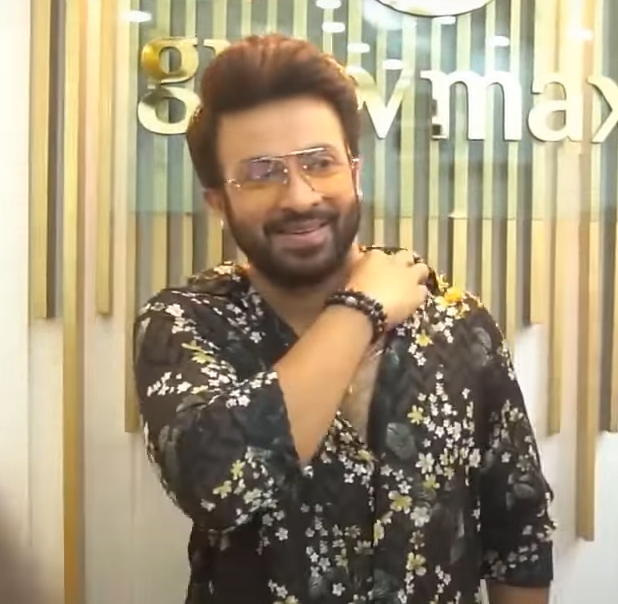
Shakib Khan won the award maximum eight times for his performances in the films Priya Amar Priya (2008), Bhalobaslei Ghor Bandha Jay Na (2010), King Khan (2011), Don Number One (2012), Purno Doirgho Prem Kahini (2013), Hero: The Superstar (2014) and Shikari (2016), Toofan (2024)

.

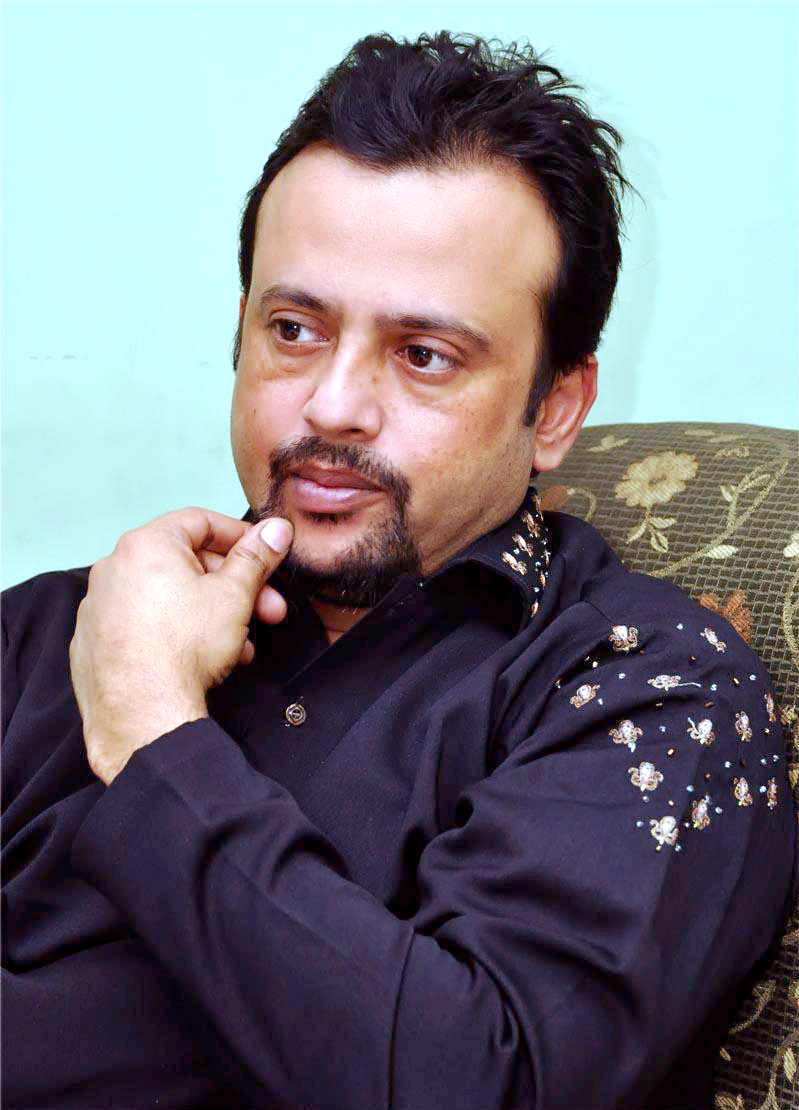
Riaz won the award the second most five times for his performances in Shashurbari Zindabad (2001), O Priya Tumi Kothay (2002), Moner Majhe Tumi (2003) and Hridoyer Kotha (2006).

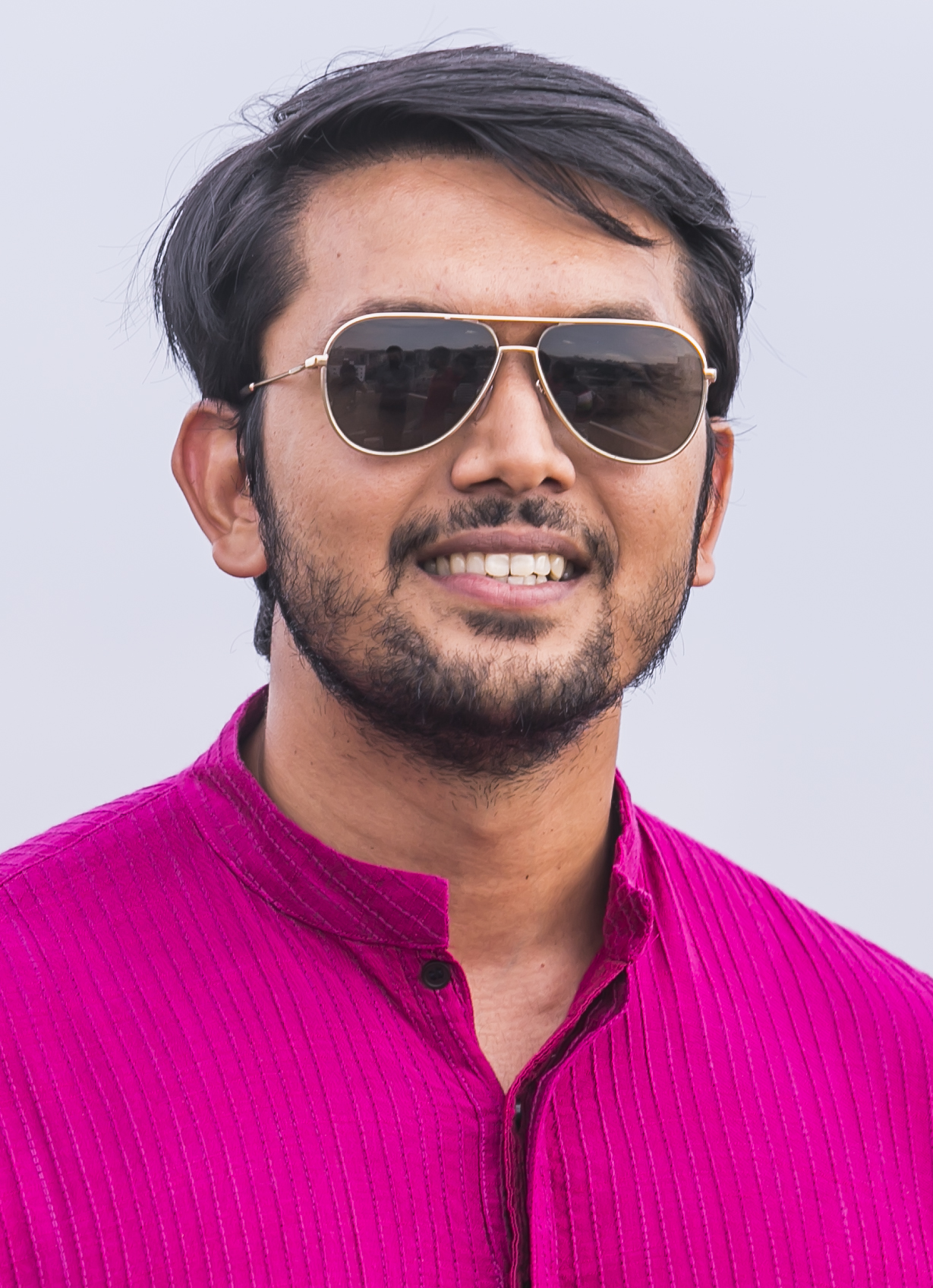
Arifin Shuvoo won the award twice for his performance in Chuye Dile Mon (2015) and Dhaka Attack (2017).

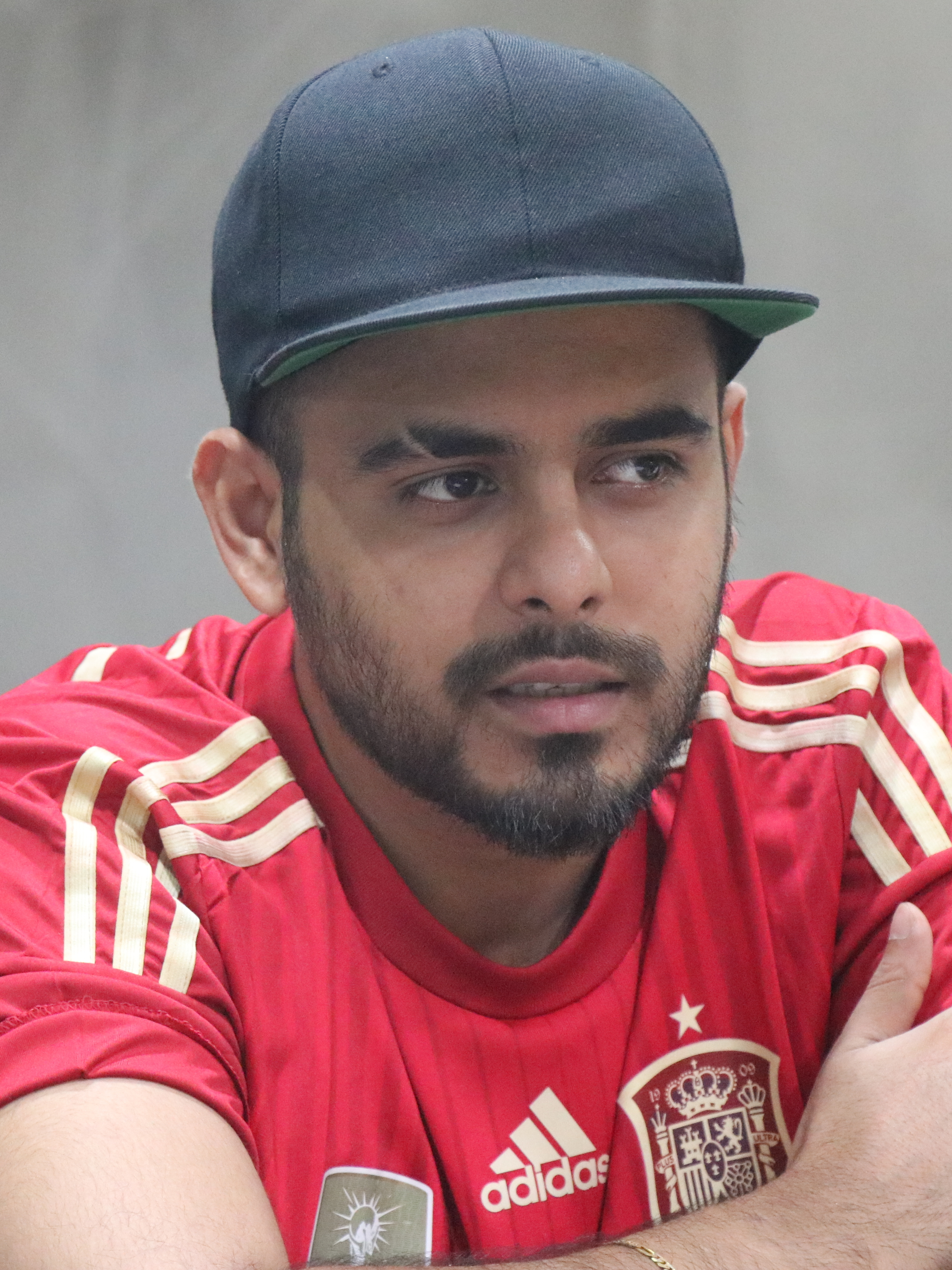
Siam Ahmed won the award thrice for his performance in PoraMon 2 (2018), Fagun Haway (2019) and Mridha Bonam Mridha (2021)

=== 1998–2009 ===
Year (Note: The years given in the list are considered to be the year of release of the film and not the year of the award. The awards are usually held in the following year.)	Nominee(s)	Film(s)	Ref
1998 (1st)	**Riaz**		
1998 (1st)	Manna		
1998 (1st)	Shakil Khan		
1999 (2nd)	**Manna**		
1999 (2nd)	Ferdous Ahmed		
1999 (2nd)	Riaz		
2000 (3rd)	**Manna**		
2000 (3rd)	Ferdous Ahmed		
2000 (3rd)	Riaz		
2001 (4th)	**Riaz**	**Shoshurbari Zindabad**	
2001 (4th)	Ferdous Ahmed	Premer Jala	
2001 (4th)	Manna	Abbajan	
2001 (4th)	Mahfuz Ahmed	Dui Duari	
2002 (5th)	**Riaz**	**O Priya Tumi Kothay**	
2002 (5th)	Kazi Maruf	Itihas	
2002 (5th)	Mahfuz Ahmed	Sabar Upore Prem	
2002 (5th)	Manna	Swami Strir Joddo	
2003 (6th)	**Riaz**	**Moner Majhe Tumi**	
2003 (6th)	Ferdous Ahmed	Bou Shashurir Joddho	
2003 (6th)	Manna	Dui Bodhu Ek Swami	
2004 (7th)	**Ferdous Ahmed**	**Bachelor**	
2004 (7th)	Mahfuz Ahmed	Joyjatra	
2004 (7th)	Riaz	Megher Pore Megh	
2005 (8th)	**ATM Shamsuzzaman**	**Molla Barir Bou**	
2005 (8th)	Ferdous Ahmed	Bolo Na Bhalobashi	
2005 (8th)	Manna	Ami Jel Theke Bolchi	
2005 (8th)	Riaz	Molla Barir Bou	
2006 (9th)	**Riaz**	**Hridoyer Kotha**	
2006 (9th)	Ferdous Ahmed	Rani Kuthir Baki Itihash	
2006 (9th)	Manna	Mayer Morjada	
2006 (9th)	Shakib Khan	Chachchu	
2007 (10th)	**Manna**	**Machine Man**	
2007 (10th)	Ferdous Ahmed	Jomela Sundori	
2007 (10th)	Riaz	Daruchini Dwip	
2007 (10th)	Shakib Khan	Amar Praner Priya	
2008 (11th)	**Shakib Khan**	**Priya Amar Priya**	
2008 (11th)	Zahid Hasan	Amar Ache Jol	
2008 (11th)	Mamnun Hasan Emon	Ek Buk Jala	
2008 (11th)	Riaz	Akash Chhoa Bhalobasa	
2009 (12th)	**Chanchal Chowdhury**	**Monpura**	
2009 (12th)	Mamnun Hasan Emon	Piriter Agun Jole Digun	
2009 (12th)	Mosharraf Karim	Third Person Singular Number	
2009 (12th)	Riaz	Protarok	
2009 (12th)	Shakib Khan	Bolbo Kotha Bashor Ghore	

=== 2010s ===
Year	Nominee(s)	Film(s)	Ref
2010 (13th)	**Shakib Khan**	**Bhalobaslei Ghor Bandha Jay Na**	
2010 (13th)	Kazi Maruf	Ora Amake Valo Hote Dilo Na	
2010 (13th)	Chanchal Chowdhury	Moner Manush	
2010 (13th)	Ferdous Ahmed	Jaago	
2010 (13th)	Mamnun Hasan Emon	Gohine Shobdo	
2011 (14th)	**Shakib Khan**	**King Khan**	
2011 (14th)	Zahid Hasan	Projapoti: The Mysterious Bird	
2011 (14th)	Ferdous Ahmed	Guerrilla	
2011 (14th)	Mosharraf Karim	Projapoti: The Mysterious Bird	
2012 (15th)	**Shakib Khan**	**Don Number One**	
2012 (15th)	Ananta Jalil	Most Welcome	
2012 (15th)	Ferdous Ahmed	Hothath Shedin	
2012 (15th)	Shahiduzzaman Selim	Chorabali	
2013 (16th)	**Shakib Khan**	**Purno Doirgho Prem Kahini**	
2013 (16th)	Ananta Jalil	Nishwartha Bhalobasa	
2013 (16th)	Arifin Shuvoo	Purno Doirgho Prem Kahini	
2013 (16th)	Mosharraf Karim	Television	
2014 (17th)	**Shakib Khan**	**Hero: The Superstar**	
2014 (17th)	Ananta Jalil	Most Welcome 2	
2014 (17th)	Arifin Shuvoo	Agnee	
2014 (17th)	Ferdous Ahmed	Brihonnola	
2015 (18th)	**Arifin Shuvoo**	**Chuye Dile Mon**	
2015 (18th)	Mahfuz Ahmed	Zero Degree	
2015 (18th)	Mosharraf Karim	Jalal's Story	
2015 (18th)	Shakib Khan	Eito Prem	
2016 (19th)	**Shakib Khan**	**Shikari**	
2016 (19th)	Arifin Shuvoo	Musafir	
2016 (19th)	Chanchal Chowdhury	Aynabaji	
2016 (19th)	Riaz	Krishnopokkho	
2017 (20th)	**Arifin Shuvoo**	**Dhaka Attack**	
2017 (20th)	Zahid Hasan	Haldaa	
2017 (20th)	Mosharraf Karim	Haldaa	
2017 (20th)	Shakib Khan	Rajneet	
2018 (21st)	**Siam Ahmed**	**Poramon 2**	
2018 (21st)	Arifin Shuvoo	Bhalo Theko	
2018 (21st)	Chanchal Chowdhury	Debi	
2018 (21st)	Shakib Khan	Super Hero (film)	
2019 (22nd)	**Siam Ahmed**	**Fagun Haway**	
2019 (22nd)	Arifin Shuvoo	Shapludu	
2019 (22nd)	Tahsan Rahman Khan	Jodi Ekdin	
2019 (22nd)	Shakib Khan	Password	

=== 2020s ===
Year	Nominee(s)	Film(s)	Ref.
2021 (23rd)	**Siam Ahmed**	**Mridha Bonam Mridha**	
2021 (23rd)	Arifin Shuvoo	Mission Extreme	
2021 (23rd)	Tariq Anam Khan	Mridha Bonam Mridha	
2021 (23rd)	Shakib Khan	Nabab LLB	
2022 (24th)	**Chanchal Chowdhury**	**Hawa**	
2022 (24th)	Sariful Razz	Poran	
2022 (24th)	Shakib Khan	Golui	
2024	Shakib khan	toofan	
