= Tauquir Ahmed =

Bangladeshi architect and actor

- তৌকির আহমেদ
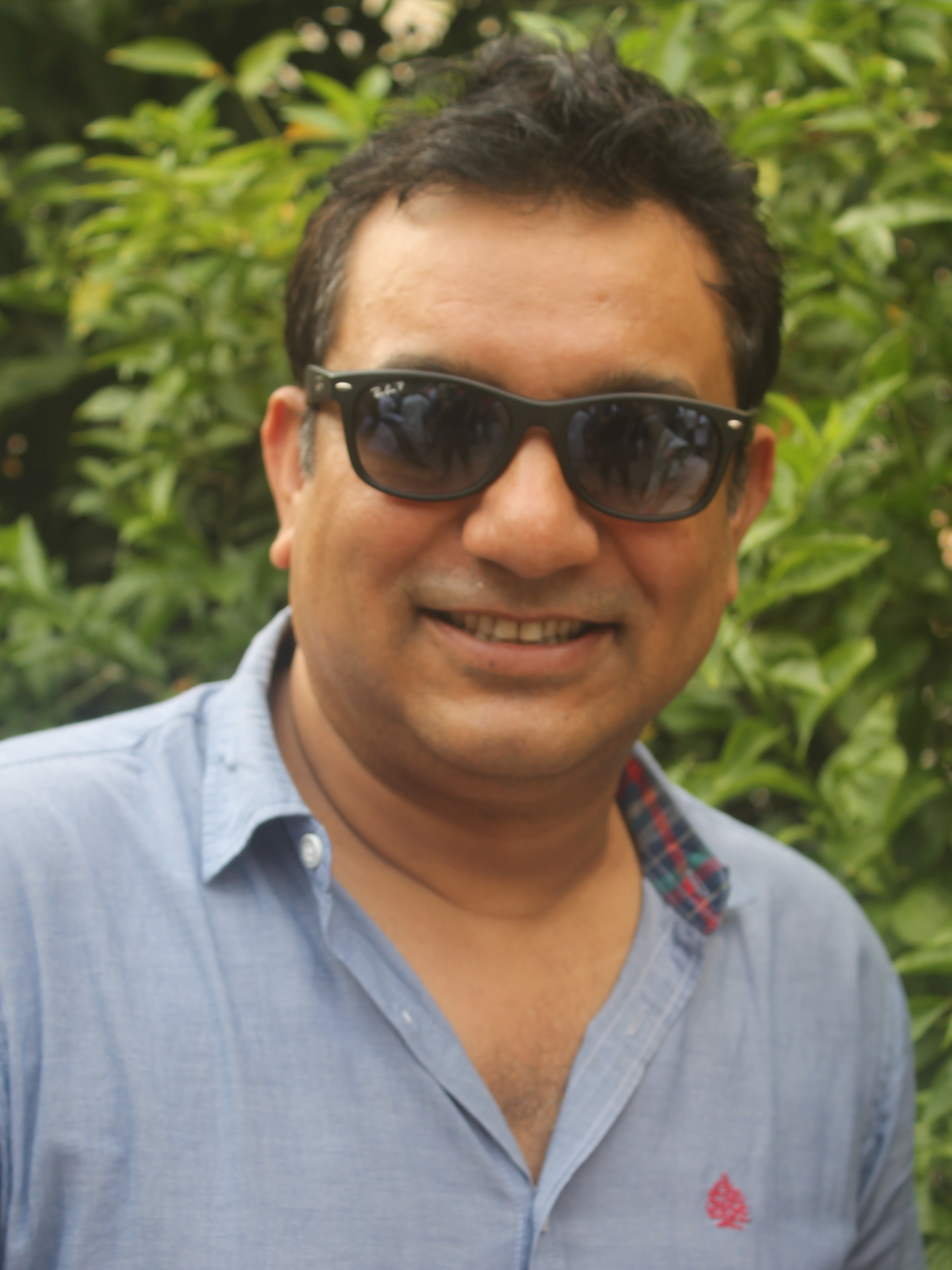
- Ahmed in 2018
- Pronunciation: [t̪ou̯kiɾ aɦmed̪]
- Born: 5 March 1966 (age 60)
- Education: Bangladesh University of Engineering and Technology
- Occupations: Actor, director
- Spouse: Bipasha Hayat (m. 1999)
- Children: 2
- Relatives: Abul Hayat (father-in-law)
- Awards: Full list

Tauquir Ahmed (Note: Bengali: [t̪ou̯kiɾ aɦmed̪].) (Bengali: তৌকীর আহমেদ, pronounced [t̪ou̯kiɾ aɦmed̪]; born 5 March 1966) is a Bangladeshi architect and actor, turned director in both television and cinema. His films won many international and national awards including Bangladesh National Film Awards in the Best Director, Best Screenplay and Best Story categories for the films Joyjatra (2004) and Oggatonama (2016).

== Education ==
Ahmed studied in Jhenidah Cadet College (JCC) for his SSC and HSC exam. In JCC he actively took part in inter-house drama competition. He then studied architecture in Bangladesh University of Engineering and Technology (BUET). He completed film diploma from New York Film Academy in 2002. He had training in theatre direction from Royal Court Theatre, London (British Council Scholarship, 1995) and acting (Stage) from ITI training, University of Theatre of Nations, 1989.

== Career ==
Ahmed started his career as a lead-actor in romantic role in early 1980s. Tauquir Ahmed made his acting debut in the 1989 television drama Firiye Dao Aranya (Return the Forest), directed by Kha Ma Harun. The production also featured Abdul Bariq Mukul and Munira Yusuf Memi.Many of his dramas broadcast on BTV at that time. Ahmed came out as a film director by making Joyjatra, Rupkothar Golpo, and Daruchini Dip.

== Personal life ==
Ahmed married actress Bipasha Hayat on 23 July 1999. Together they have one son - Arib and one daughter - Arisha. He is the son-in-law of Abul Hayat.

In 2026, Ahmed celebrated his 60 years birthday, where a life in the arts begins to take on its full shape, at the Bangladesh Shilpakala Academy.

== Works ==
=== Dramas and telefilms ===
| Year | Title | Director & Playwright | Co-stars | Notes |
|---|---|---|---|---|
| 1989 | Firiye Dao Oronno | Director- Producer: Kha Ma Harun Playwright: Monsurul Aziz | Munira Yusuf Memi | BTV drama |
| 1996 | Harjit | Abul Hayat | Bipasha Hayat | teleplay |
| | Beli | Abul Hayat | Bipasha Hayat | teleplay |
| | Pratyasha | Abul Hayat | Bipasha Hayat | teleplay |
| | Ekjan Aparadhini | Abul Hayat | Bipasha Hayat | teleplay |
| | Dola | Abul Hayat | Bipasha Hayat | drama series |
| | Bhalobashi Tomake | Robin Khan | Syeda Tania Mahbub Tinni | |
| | Hasuli | Abul Hayat | Bipasha Hayat | drama series |
| 2011 | Oi Khane Jeonako Tumi | Arif Khan | Purnima, Mahfuz Ahmed | TV play, aired on ntv |
| 2013 | Gopon Kotha Chilo Bolbar | Sayed Zamen; Asaduzzanam Shohag | Rakhi, Deepa Khondokar | telefilm |
| 2015 | Pora Gondho Sohor Jure | Aranya Anwar | Tarin Ahmed | telefilm, based on the spree of petrol bomb and arson attacks on vehicles in Bangladesh in 2015 |
| 2015 | Kemon Acho | Chayanika Chowdhury; Rumman Rashid Khan | Aupee Karim, Mahfuz Ahmed | single-episode TV play, aired on ntv on its anniversary celebrations |
| 2015 | Andhokarey Jonaki | Chayanika Chowdhury; Faria Hossain | Zakia Bari Momo, Nazira Ahmed Mou | teleplay, aired on Maasranga Television |
| 2015 | Opar Anando | Chayanika Chowdhury; Faria Hossain | Momo, Nazira Ahmed Mou | teleplay, aired on ATN Bangla |
| 2015 | Sonali Danar Chil | Abul Hayat (both) | Bipasha Hayat | teleplay, aired on Channel i on Eid |
| TBA | Zohra Begumer Ichchapotro | Arif Khan Tauquir Ahmed | | Waiting for Release |

As director

| Year | Title | Playwright | Artists | Notes |
|---|---|---|---|---|
| | Tomar Bosonto Dinay | | | drama series, debut as a director |
| 2004 | Aronyer Sukh Dukkha | Ferdous Hasan | Afzal Hossain, Suborna Mustafa | 6th drama serial directed by Tauquir, aired on ntv |
| 2011 | Chandramagna | Bipasha Hayat | | drama series |
| | Bissoy | Bipasha Hayat | Rakhi | drama, debut of Rakhi |
| 2015 | Balloshikkha | Palash Mahbub | Tauquir, Roja Paromita | telefilm, aired on Eid-ul-Fitr |

=== Filmography ===
| Year | Film | Director | Notes |
|---|---|---|---|
| 1994 | Nodir Naam Modhumoti | Tanvir Mokammel | |
| 1999 | Chitra Nodir Pare | Tanvir Mokammel | |
| 2001 | Lalsalu | Tanvir Mokammel | |
| 2006 | Rupkothar Golpo | Tauquir Ahmed | |
| 2009 | Britter Baire | | |
| 2009 | Rabeya | Tanvir Mokammel | |
| 2009 | Priyotomeshu | Morshedul Islam | |
| 2015 | Jalaler Golpo | Abu Shahed Emon | |
| 2018 | Komola Rocket | Noor Imran Mithu | |
| 2022 | The Beauty Circus | Mahmud Didar | |
| 2023 | Mujib: The Making of a Nation | Shyam Benegal | |

=== As director ===
| Year | Title | Story | Cast | Notes |
|---|---|---|---|---|
| 2004 | Joyjatra | Amjad Hossain | Mahfuz Ahmed, Bipasha Hayat, Azizul Hakim | |
| 2006 | Rupkothar Golpo | Tauquir Ahmed | Chanchal Chowdhury, Tauquir Ahmed, Taskin Sumi | |
| 2007 | Daruchini Dip | Humayun Ahmed | Riaz, Momo, Mosharraf Karim | |
| 2016 | Oggyatonama | Tauquir Ahmed | Fazlur Rahman Babu, Shahiduzzaman Selim | |
| 2017 | Haldaa | Azad Bulbul | Zahid Hasan, Mosharraf Karim, Nusrat Imrose Tisha, Fazlur Rahman Babu | |
| 2019 | Fagun Haway | Tauquir Ahmed | Nusrat Imroz Tisha, Siam Ahmed, Yashpal Sharma | |
| 2021 | Sphulingo | Tauquir Ahmed | Pori Moni, Shamol Mawla, Zakia Bari Momo, Abul Hayat, Shahidul Alam Sachchu, Fazlur Rahman Babu, Rawnak Hasan | |

=== Web series ===
| Year | Title | OTT | Character | Co-Artist | Director |
|---|---|---|---|---|---|
| 2023 | Buker Moddhye Agun | Hoichoi | Shafqat Reza | Ziaul Faruq Apurba, Yash Rohan | Taneem Rahman Angshu |

=== Publication ===
- Protisoron (stage play, 2012)
- Icchamrittu (stage play, 2013)
- Oggyatonama (stage play 2015)

=== Other projects ===
- Nakkhatrabari Resort

== Awards and recognitions ==
Bangladesh National Film Awards

- Best Screenplay, Best Director and Best Producer (Joyjatra, 2004).
- Best Film, Best Actor in a Negative Role and Best Story Award, (Oggatonama, 2016)

Meril Prothom Alo Awards

- Best Film Director, (Joyjatra, 2004)
- Best Film Director, (Rupkothar Golpo, 2006)

Dhaka International Film Festival

- Special Award for the Film, Joyjatra (2004)
- Audience Choice Award, Film: Rupkothar Golpo (2006)
- Special Mention, Film: Oggatonama (2017)
- Best Director, FIPRESCI Award: Bangladesh Panorama Section, Film: Haldaa (2018)

Asia-Pacific Film Festival

- Best Film Award, Film: Oggatonama (2017)

Cutting Edge International Film Festival, Florida, USA

- Best Narrative Feature Award, Film: Oggatonama (2016)

Film Fest Kosovo

- Best director and Best screenplay Award, Film: Oggatonama(The Unnamed)

SAARC Film Festival, Sri Lanka

- Best Feature Film, Best Original Score, Best Editor and Best Cinematographer Award, Film: Haldaa (2018)
- Best Screenplay Award, Film: Oggatonama (2017)

Bali Film Festival, Indonesia

- Audience Choice Award, Film: Daruchini Dwip

Gulf of Naples Independent Film Festival, Italy

- Jury Mention Award, Film: Oggatonama (2016)

Kashmir World Film Festival, India

- Best Feature Film Award, Film: Haldaa (2018)

Religion Today Film Festival, Italy

- Special Mention Award, Film: Oggatonama (2016)
- Grand Prix, Film: Haldaa (2018)

Washington DC South Asian Film Festival, USA

- Best Director, Film: Oggatonama (2016)
