= 24th Meril-Prothom Alo Awards =

Bangladeshi media awards for 2022

24th Meril Prothom Alo Awards
- Date: 23 September 2023
- Site: Bangabandhu International Conference Center, Dhaka, Bangladesh
- Hosted by: Pritom Hasan, Siam Ahmed

Highlights
- Most awards: Hawa (5)
- Most nominations: Hawa and Poran (6)

24th Meril Prothom Alo Awards is the 24th annual award given by Square Group and Prothom Alo jointly. The award is given for 2022's contribution to film, television and music. The award was distributed through a ceremony organised at the Bangabandhu International Conference Center Hall of Fame in Bangabandhu International Conference Center on 8 September 2023. Musician Pritam Hasan and actor Siam Ahmed hosted the program, they hosted this program for the first time.

Hawa and Poran jointly received maximum six category nominations. Redoan Rony received four nominations in two different categories (Best Film and Best Web Series). Chanchal Chowdhury received three nominations in three different categories (Best Film Actor and Best TV Actor in the Star Poll and Best Film Actor in the Critics category).

Hawa won five awards. Chanchal Chowdhury won two awards in the Best Film Actor (Star Poll) and Best Film Actor (Critics) categories out of three nominations.

== List of winners and nominees ==
Below is a list of winners and nominees from the Music, Film, Television and Digital Media, New Artist, and Critics categories. Winners' names are listed in bold.

=== Lifetime honors ===
- Syed Abdul Hadi

=== Star Survey ===
Best Singer	Best Female Singer
**Erfan Mridha Shiblu** - **"Sada Sada Kala Kala"'** (Movie: Hawa; Ayan Chakladar - "Chalo Niralaya" (Movie: Poran; Imran Mahmudul - "Sleep Sleep Eyes"; Chandan Sinha - "Addressless" (Movie: Hridita	**Atiya Anisa** - **"Chalo Niralaya"'** (Movie: '**Poran'**); Dilshad Nahar Kona - "Taar Hawate" (Movie: Operation Sundarbans); Konal - "Hatekhari" (Album: Uro Prem); Sumi Shabnam - "Chele Tor Preme Porar Karon''
Best Film Actor	Best Film Actress
**Chanchal Chowdhury** - '**Hawa'**; Sariful Razz - Poran; Shakib Khan - Golui	**Bidya Sinha Saha Mim** - '**Poran**; Jaya Ahsan - Impress Telefilm; Puja Cherry - Golui
Best TV Actor	Best TV Actress
**Afran Nisho** - '**Punorjonmo Universe**; Chanchal Chowdhury - Karagar; Tausif Mahbub - Lilua	**Mehazabien Chowdhury'** - '**Punorjonmo Universe'**; Tasnia Farin - Karagar; Safa Kabir - Fagun Theke Fagune
Best Newcomer	
**Rodela Tapur** - '**Deshantar'**; Faizul Yamin - Redrum; Rizvi Riju - Hawa; Shahnaz Sumi - Paap Punno

=== Critic ===
Best Film	Best Film Director
**Ajay Kumar Kundu** - **Hawa**; Redwan Rony - Cafe Desire; Redwan Rony - Dui Diner Duniya	**Mezbaur Rahman Suman** - **Hawa**; Anam Biswas - Dui Diner Duniya; Rabiul Alam Rabi - Cafe Desire
Best Motion Picture Actor	Best Motion Picture Actress
**Chanchal Chowdhury** - **Dui Diner Duniya**; Azad Abul Kalam - Gunin; Shariful Raj - Poran	**Nazifa Tushi** - **Hawa**; Bidya Sinha Saha Mim - Poran; Rodela Tapur - Emigration
Best Screenplay in a Feature Film	Best Director in a Feature Film
Al Amin Hasan Nirjhar- Araal; Nahid Hasnat - "Galiber Prem O Boshonter Kabbo"	**Nazmul Naveen'' - Araal**; Noor Imran Mithu - "Ek Aloukik Bikeler Golpo"
Best Actor in a Feature Film	Best Actress in a Feature Film
**Pritam Hasan** - **Araal**; Khairul Basar - "Galiber Prem O Boshonter Kabbo"	**Nazia Haque Arsha'** - **Galiber Prem O Boshonter Kabbo**; Sabila Noor - Ridiqa
Best web series	Best web series director
**Redoan Rony** - '**Shaaticup'**; Redoan Rony - Pett Kata Shaw; Shakib and Khan - Karagar	**Nuhash Humayun'** - '**Pett Kata Shaw'**; Mohammad Tauqeer Islam - Shaaticup; Syed Ahmed Shawqi - Karagar
