= Chanchal Chowdhury =

Bangladeshi actor (born 1974)

- চঞ্চল চৌধুরী
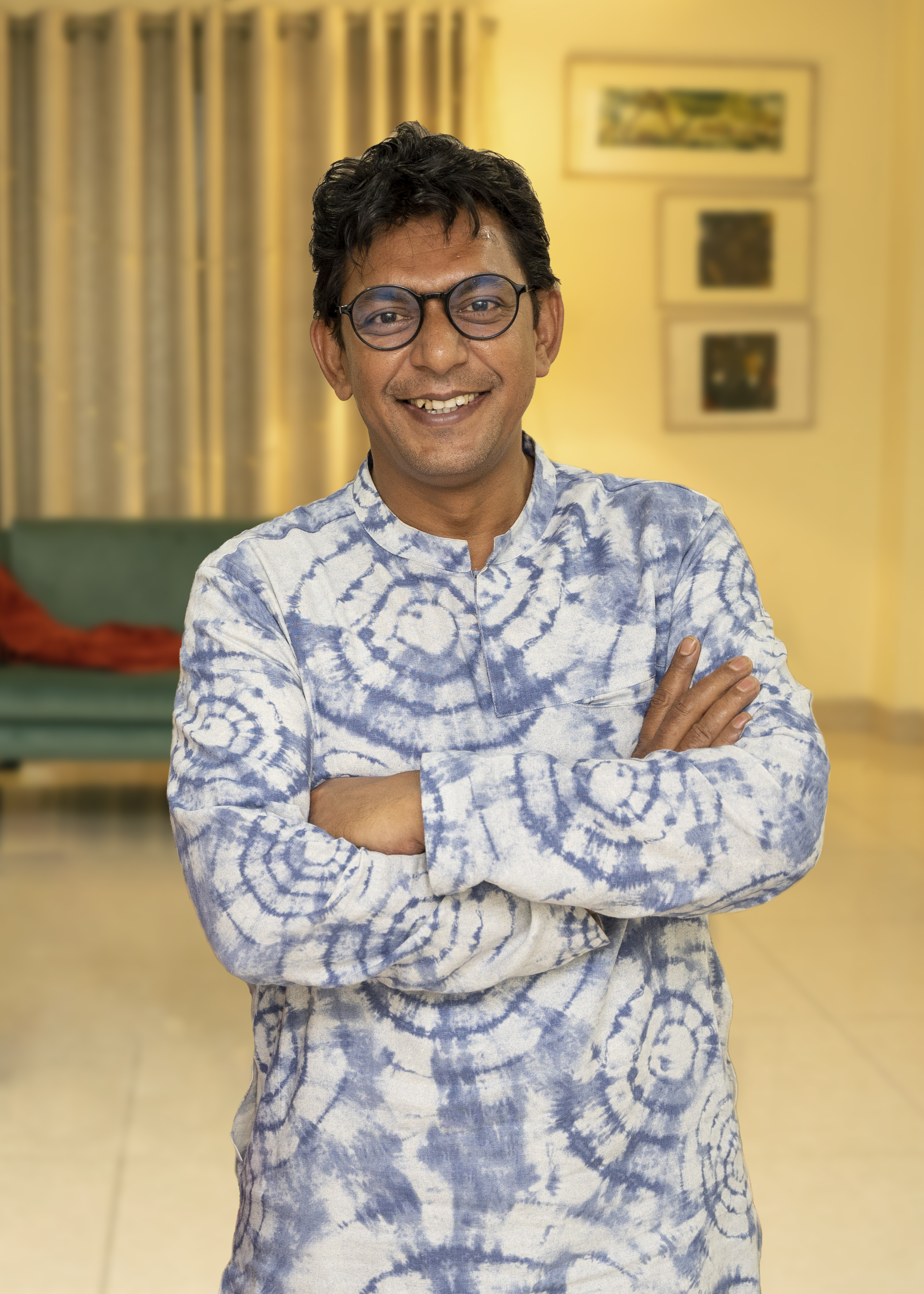
- Chowdhury in 2022
- Pronunciation: [t͡ʃɔnt͡ʃɔl t͡ʃou̯d̪ʱuɾi]
- Born: Suchinta Chowdhury Chanchal; June 1, 1974 (age 52); Boalia, Sujanagar, Pabna, Bangladesh
- Education: University of Dhaka (BFA)
- Occupations: Actor; television personality; playback singer
- Years active: 1996–present
- Spouse: Shanta Chowdhury (m. 2007)
- Children: 1
- Awards: Full list

Suchinta Chowdhury Chanchal (born June 1, 1974), better known as Chanchal Chowdhury (Note: Bengali pronunciation: [t͡ʃɔnt͡ʃɔl t͡ʃou̯d̪ʱuɾi].) (Bengali: চঞ্চল চৌধুরী, pronounced [t͡ʃɔnt͡ʃɔl t͡ʃou̯d̪ʱuɾi]), is a Bangladeshi actor. He gained recognition with television roles in late 2000s, and went on to become one of the most popular leading men of Bangla cinema in the following decade. He is the recipient of several accolades, including three National Film Awards and seven Meril Prothom Alo Awards.

Born in Pabna, Chowdhury graduated from University of Dhaka and initially served as a lecturer at UODA while acting in some Aranyak Nattyadal stage productions. He had a breakthrough with the play Che'r Cycle (2003) which was followed by prolific work in television. His popular roles in the dramas Shurjer Hashi (2005) and Talpatar Shepai (2006) culminated in a film career starting with the critically praised Rupkothar Golpo (2006).

Over the following period of time, Chowdhury gained reputation for being selective about his projects. He headlined films such as the musical Monpura (2009), the thrillers Aynabaji (2016) and Debi (2018), and the mystery-drama Hawa (2022)—all four of which rank among the highest-grossing Bangladeshi films of all time. His other notable works include the television dramas Vober Hat (2007) and Sakin Sarisuri (2009); the musical drama film Moner Manush (2010) and the Mrinal Sen-biopic Padatik (2024); and the web productions Taqdeer (2021), Dui Diner Duniya and Karagar (both 2022). Chowdhury is a celebrity endorser of brands and products and is also involved with social causes related to women, children and disabled people.

== Early life and education ==
Chanchal was born and raised in a Hindu family of Kamarhaat village, Pabna, Bangladesh. His father, Radha Gobinda Chowdhury (died 2022) was a teacher, while mother Nomita is a housewife. Chowdhury passed his SSC examination from Rajbari Government High School in 1990 and HSC examination from Rajbari Government College in 1992. In the same year he got admission in the Department of Fine Arts at the University of Dhaka and gradually developed an interest in acting.

Chowdhury settled in Dhaka in 1993. Post graduation, he served as a lecturer of Fine Arts in University of Development Alternative.

Born as Suchinta Chowdhury Chanchal, he uses "Chanchal Chowdhury" as his screen name.

== Career ==
=== Early work: stage and television (1996–2004) ===
Chowdhury joined Aranyak Nattyadal, a theater group headed by actor Mamunur Rashid, in 1996. Chowdhury made his theatre debut with Kalo Daitya, and went on to work in a number of plays, including the popular drama Shangkranti (1998). He had six roles in Che'r Cycle (2003), a Bengali Theatre production that was applauded by audience. The actor considers it as one of his best works on stage.

Chowdhury appeared on television first in 2000, briefly playing a journalist in Rashid's Shundori. His first leading role came the same year in the drama Grash, directed by Faridur Rahman. It was in 2004 that actor Fazlur Rahman Babu introduced Chowdhury to directors Gias Uddin Selim and Mostofa Sarwar Farooki. Chowdhury subsequently found more work in television dramas; his notable roles of this period include Selim's Shurjer Hashi (2005).

=== Public recognition through dramas and early films (2005–15) ===
Chowdhury gained wider recognition for his two collaborations with Farooki: the commercial Maa (2005) and the drama Talpatar Shepai (2006). For Maa, he won the Meril Prothom Alo Award in Best Model category in 2006. A starring role in the drama Vober Hat (2007) brought him further popularity, and he then went on to work with directors Salauddin Lavlu and Saidul Anam Tutul. His acting in Lavlu's Sakin Sarisuri (2009) was praised by critics. The actor worked prolifically in television between late 2000s to early 2010s, and also started appearing frequently in Eid-special TV plays.

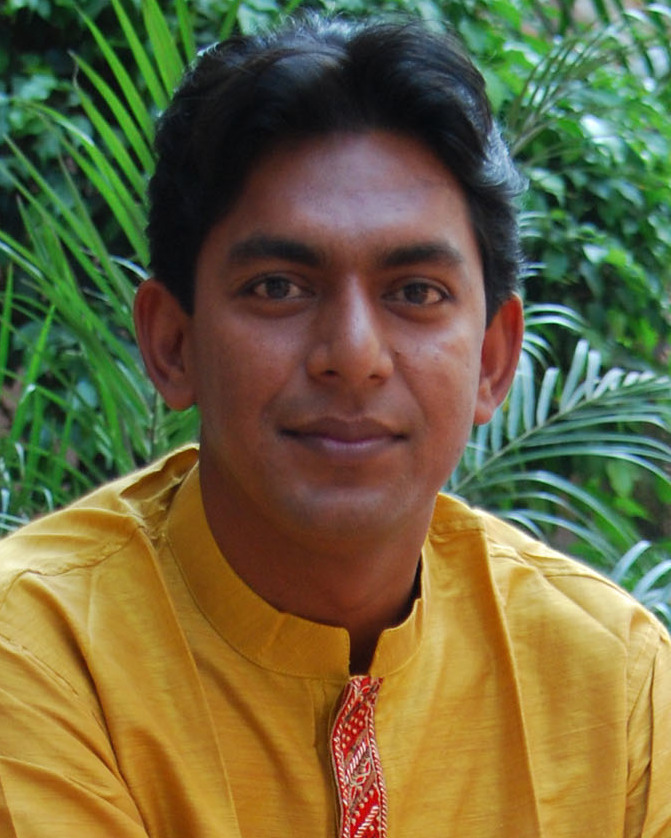
Chowdhury in 2011. He worked prolifically in television during this time.

Chowdhury's first film was the Tauquir Ahmed-directorial Rupkothar Golpo (2006), which earned him a Meril Prothom Alo award in Best Actor (Critics' Choice) category. He won his first National Film Award for his breakthrough performance in the 2009 musical Monpura. He followed this success with the Indo-Bangladeshi production Moner Manush (2010). In 2012, he appeared in Farooki's film Television, and also made his debut in playback singing, alongside Meher Afroz Shaon, in the war film Pita (2012).

=== Continued success (2016–22) ===
The 2016 crime thriller Aynabaji, directed by Amitabh Reza, won Chowdhury his second National Film Award. He played a con-man who serves as body double to convicted criminals. Zahid Akbar of The Daily Star commended him for "performing remarkably and setting new acting standards". The psychological thriller Debi (2018) starred Chowdhury as Misir Ali opposite Jaya Ahsan, directed by Anam Biswas. Based on Humayun Ahmed's novel of the same name, the film was well-received by critics and became a box-office success. In 2019, Chowdhury starred in a regular television series titled Kaaler Jatra that aired on BTV. Written by Mamunur Rashid, it saw Chowdhury playing the leader of a struggling theatre troupe. The next year in December, he re-performed his play Che'r Cycle on stage. The 2020 thriller series Taqdeer, directed by Syed Ahmed Shawki and starring Chowdhury in the titular role, was well-received by audience. The streaming channel Hoichoi's subscriptions reportedly doubled after its release. His acting in Taqdeer won him a Blender's Choice – The Daily Star Award for best male performance. The same year, he also won the Breakthrough Performance of the Year award at the 2021 Hoichoi ceremony, for his work in Taqdeer and Boli—a web series in which he starred that year.

Previously having collaborated on Aynabaji, Chowdhury and director Amitabh Reza reunited in the Chorki web-film Munshigiri (2021). He also played the central role in Giasuddin Selim's romantic thriller Paap Punno, which was released in 2022. For the web film Dui Diner Duniya (2022), directed by Anam Biswas, Chowdhury and Fazlur Rahman Babu received rave reviews for their complementing performances, and the former won a Best Actor (Critics' Choice) trophy at Meril Prothom Alo award ceremony.

Chowdhury refers to the role of a mysterious, dumb-mute convict in Karagar (2022) as the most challenging one of his career. While the series opened to mixed-to-positive reviews, his acting earned significant critical praise and popularity, both in Bangladesh as well as in India. Further acclaim came for Chowdhury as Chan Majhi in Mejbaur Rahman Sumon's directorial debut, Hawa (2022). Among numerous accolades, he won his third National Film Award for this performance. Commercially, Hawa was a domestic blockbuster, and also attracted an audience in Kolkata and USA. At the 95th Academy Awards, Hawa was submitted as the Bangladeshi nomination in Best International Feature Film category, and was also shortlisted for 80th Golden Globe Awards. In December 2022, Chowdhury made a comeback on stage with a supporting role in Rarang, a play based on the life of Alfred Soren.

=== Recent work (2023–present) ===
Chowdhury made a cameo appearance as Sheikh Lutfar Rahman in the biopic Mujib: The Making of a Nation (2023), directed by Shyam Benegal. In 2024, Chowdhury starred in another Chorki web-film, The Last Defenders of Monogamy, directed by Farooki. It opened to mixed reviews, with critics finding Chowdhury's character to be poorly written. He subsequently made a cameo appearance in Raihan Rafi's top-grossing crime thriller, Toofan (2024).

Chowdhury's performance in Karagar led to his casting as Mrinal Sen in Srijit Mukherji's biographical film, Padatik. Chowdhury stated that getting introduced to Sen's ideals and principles while researching for the role was his "biggest reward" during the production. Padatik opened to generally favourable reviews in August 2024, and so did the actor's work. Saptorshi Roy of Anandabazar Patrika particularly noted Chowdhury for adapting Sen's mannerisms accurately. Suparna Majumder of Sangbad Pratidin similarly praised Chowdhury, but criticised his inconsistent makeup.

In 2025, Chowdhury played himself in two of the year's most successful productions: Tanim Noor's Utshob and Sanjoy Somadder's Insaaf. He will next star in Sukorno Shahed Dhiman's upcoming Chorki web series, Feu.

== Personal life ==
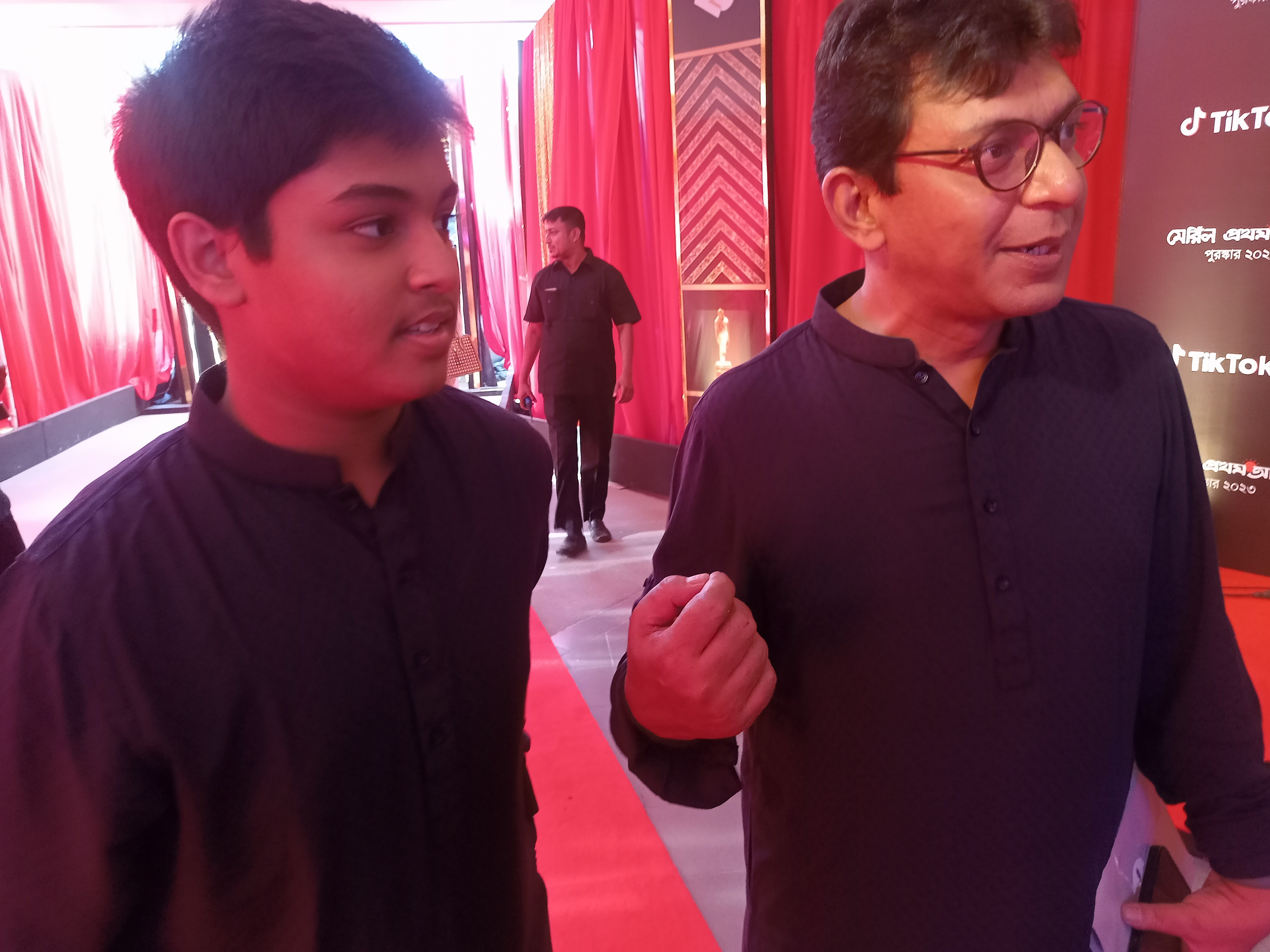
Chowdhury with his son, Shaishob Rudra Shudda, in March 2024

Chowdhury met his wife Shanta, a physician by profession, in 2005. They got married legally on August 7, 2007, and then had a Hindu wedding ceremony on August 22. Shanta gave birth to their son, Shaishob Rudra Shudda, in 2009.

Shudda joined the entertainment industry in 2022 playing a minor character in the drama Sushil Family. He subsequently appeared alongside his father in the drama Iti Tomar Ami and the web-film The Last Defenders of Monogamy (both 2024).

== Public image and other work ==
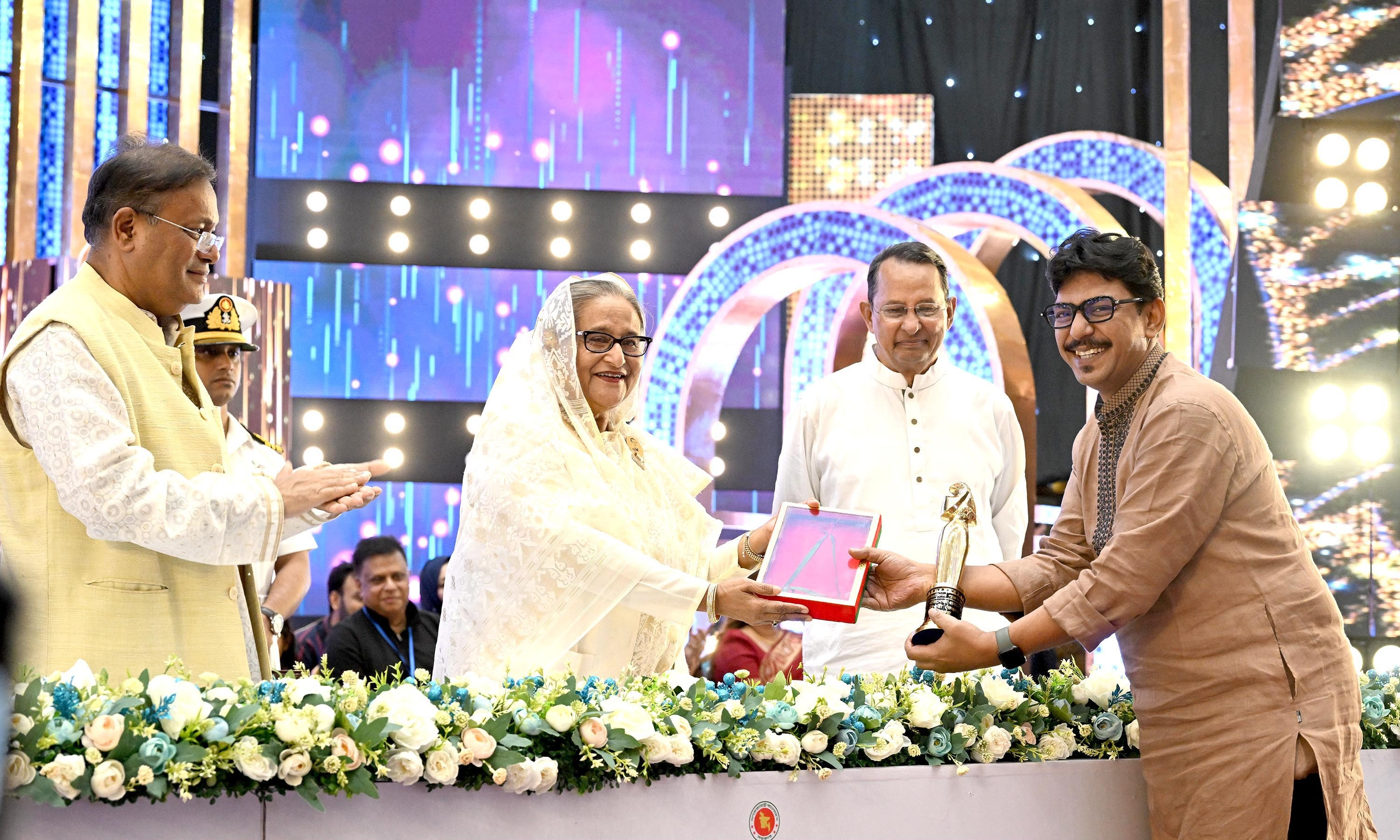
Chowdhury receives National Film Award in 2022 from then-Prime Minister Sheikh Hasina

Writing for The Daily Star, Shah Alam Shazu comments that Chowdhury's performance in Aynabaji (2016) "propelled him as everyone's favourite actor", while his portrayal of Misir Ali in Debi (2018) "made him synonymous to the role for the current generation of Misir Ali fans". Chowdhury's mentor Mamunur Rashid defines him as an "ideal actor", noting that his hardwork and perseverance brought him success, while Syed Ahmed Shawki, who directed him in Karagar, named Chowdhury as "one of the finest actors of this time". In national media outlets, Chowdhury is often described as one of the highly acclaimed and successful actors of Bangla cinema.

In addition to Bangladesh, Chowdhury has acquired a significant fanbase in the Indian Bengal, where his films have drawn popularity and have also been remade by local Indian film industries. Four films starring Chowdhury—Monpura (2009), Aynabaji (2016), Debi (2018) and Hawa (2022)—rank among the highest-grossing Bangladeshi films, and the latter two also are top-grossing Bangladeshi films in the international market. Agnideb Bandyopadhyay of The Telegraph credits the actor as the foremost propeller of Bengali media into the global scene, noting, "There is a new dimension to Chanchal Chowdhury that is unlocked with every project that he embarks on, where his fandom knows no borders or lines." In 2023, Chowdhury received the Shera Bangali (Best Bengali) Award in Kolkata at ABP Ananda Shera Bangali Shommanona ceremony.

Chowdhury has garnered a reputation for being extremely selective about his projects. In 2009, after Monpura became a major hit, he was flooded by over 150 film offers but declined all of them. In his own words, "out of a sea of offers, I pick the one that resonates with my artistic soul". A writer for The Business Standard praises the actor's quality-over-quantity approach, contrasting it with his contemporaries who "are more worried about how they measure up to Shah Rukh Khan and Tom Cruise".

Chowdhury is a celebrity endorser of multiple brands, including Bashundhra Tissue and Chik herbal hair color. In 2016, Chowdhury and actress Nusrat Imrose Tisha became ambassadors for mobile phone service company Robi Axiata Limited, for a period of two years. He and Tisha are also part of the Ritu project that aims at spreading public health awareness on menstruation, and he is associated with Bashundhra's campaign on improving public perception of autistic people. In August 2022, Chowdhury became the ambassador of Shikhbo, Jitbo, an educational startup aiming to enrich learning experience for students.

== Works ==
=== Films ===
Key
†	Denotes films that have not yet been released

Year	Title	Role	Notes	Ref.
2006	Rupkothar Golpo	Unnamed	Won — Meril Prothom Alo Award for Critics Choice Best Actor (Film)	
2009	Monpura	Shonai	Won — Bangladesh National Film Award for Best Actor; Won — Meril-Prothom Alo Award for Best Actor (Film)	
2010	Moner Manush	Kaluah	Indo-Bangladesh joint production	
2012	Television	Sulemon		
2016	Aynabaji	Sharafat Karim "Ayna" / Nizam Syeed Chowdhury	Dual role; Won — Bangladesh National Film Award for Best actor Won — Meril-Prothom Alo Award for Best Actor	
2018	Debi	Misir Ali	Nominated — Meril Prothom Alo Award for Best Actor	
2021	Munshigiri	Masood Munshi	Released on Chorki	
2022	Paap Punno	Khorshed		
2022	Hawa	Chan Majhi	Won – Bangladesh National Film Award for Best Actor	
2022	Dui Diner Duniya	Samad	Released on Chorki; Nominated – Chorki Award for Best Actor	
2023	Mujib: The Making of a Nation	Sheikh Lutfar Rahman	Cameo appearance	
2024	Toofan	AC Akram	Cameo appearance	
2024	Last Defenders of Monogamy	Shafkat	Released on Chorki	
2024	Padatik	Mrinal Sen	Indian Bengali film	
2025	Utshob	Chanchal Chowdhury		
2025	Insaaf	Himself	Cameo appearance	
2026	Bonolota Express	Abul Khayer Khan		
2026	Domm: Until The Last Breath	Sujit		
2026	Pressure Cooker	Aminul	Extended cameo appearance	
2027	Khalnayak †	TBA	Filming	
2027	Andhar †	Shamsher	Post-production; scheduled for release on 26 March 2027	
2027	Abar Dekha Holo †	TBA	Filming	
2027	Shekor †	TBA	Indian Bengali film; Post-production	
2027	Azadi †	TBA	Indian Bengali film; Post-production	

=== Television ===
Year	Title	Director	Role	Co-Artist	Notes
2000	Shundori	Mamunur Rashid	Journalist		First TV appearance
2000	Grash	Faridur Rahman			Television debut
2004	Shilalipi	Shamim Akter			Credited as Suchinta Chanchal
2005	Tiner Tolowar	Ashutosh Sujon	Muazzem		
2006	Talpatar Shepai	Mostofa Sarwar Farooki	Bulbul	Nusrat Imroz Tisha	Bengali Drama
2006	Bangsher Bati				Bengali Drama
2006	Goruchor	Salauddin Lavlu			Bengali Drama
2006	Nurunnahar				Bengali Drama
2007	Swapner Bilat	Salauddin Lavlu			Bengali Drama
2007	Etimkhana	Salauddin Lavlu			Bengali Drama
2007	Vober Hat	Salauddin Lavlu	Fiza Sir		Bengali Drama serial
2008	Tuntunni Villa				Bengali Drama serial
2008	Mama Vagnea				Bengali Drama serial
2008	Ghor Kutum	Salauddin Lavlu		A.T.M. Shamsuzzaman	Bengali Drama serial
2008	Dholer Baddo	Salauddin Lavlu		Fazlur Rahman Babu	Bengali Drama
2008	College - Student			A.K.M. Hasan	Bengali Drama
2008	Potro Mitali	Salauddin Lavlu			Bengali Drama
2009	Pattri Chai			A.K.M. Hasan, Siddique, Khushi	Bengali Drama
2009	Warren	Salauddin Lavlu		Challenger	Bengali Drama
2009	Alta Sundori	Salauddin Lavlu			Bengali Drama serial
2009	Cinderella				Bengali Drama
2009	Gadha Nogor	Salauddin Lavlu			Bengali Drama
2009	Sakin Sarisuri	Salauddin Lavlu	Japan Doctor	Masum Aziz, Nazmul Huda Bachchu, Mamunur Rashid, Mosharraf Karim, Azizul Hakim	Bengali Drama serial
2010	Khela	Mahfuz Ahmed, Humayun Ahmed		Abul Hayat, Challenger	Bengali Drama
2010	Harkipte	Salauddin Lavlu	Bohor	Amirul Haque Chowdhury, Mosharraf Karim	Bengali Drama serial
2011	Lekhok Sri Narayan Chandra Das	Salauddin Lavlu	Narayan	Amirul Haque Chowdhury, Humaira Himu, Milon Bhattacharya, Shireen Alam	Bengali Drama
2012	Idiots	Mohammad Mostafa Kamal Raz		Purnima	TV series
2014	Ujan Ganger Naiya	Giasuddin Selim, Bashar Georgis	Arif	Orchita Sporshia	Bengali Drama
2017	Vangon	Abu Hayat Mahmud		Zakia Bari Momo	Bengali Drama
2017	Ichchey Manush	Sajib Ahmed Chowdhury	Abir Hossain	Fazlur Rahman Babu	Bengali Drama
2018	Mental Family	Dipu Hazra		A.K.M Hasan, Shahanaz Khushi, Farhana Mili	Bengali Drama
2018	Ayesha	Mostofa Sarwar Farooki	Joinal	Nusrat Imroz Tisha	Bengali Drama
2019	Shohorali	Ejaj Munna		Moutushi Biswas	TV series
2020	Rupa Bhabi	Mejbah Uddin Shumon		Tareen Jahan	Bengali Drama
2020	Kingkortobbobimur			Nusrat Imroz Tisha	Bengali Drama
2021	Dark Roasted Coffee	Ejaz Munna		Faria Shahrin, Maimuna Ferdous Momo	Bengali Drama
2023	Shonda Panda	Salauddin Lavlu	Ronju Master	Shahnaz Khushi, A Kh M Hasan, Anishul Haque Barun	Bengali Drama serial

=== Theatre ===
Year	Title	Role	Notes
1996	Kalo Daitya		Arannyak Natyodol Production
1998	Shangkranti	Laley	Arannyak Natyodol Production
1999	Prakritojoner Kotha		Arannyak Natyodol Production
2000	Ora Kodom Ali		Arannyak Natyodol Production
2003	Mayur Singhason		Arannyak Natyodol Production
2003	Songkranti		Arannyak Natyodol Production
2003	Che'r Cycle	Shubra	Bengali Theatre Production; re-performed in 2020
2004	Joyjoyonti		Arannyak Natyodol Production
2004	Rarang		Arannyak Natyodol Production; re-performed in 2022

=== Web series ===
Year	Title	Role	Director	OTT	Notes	Ref.
2019	Neel Dorja	Mirza	Golam Sohrab Dodul	Bioscope		
2020	Taqdeer	Taqdeer	Syed Ahmed Shawki	Hoichoi		
2021	Contact	Black Ronju	Tanim Noor and Krishnendu Chattopadhyay	ZEE5		
2021	Unoloukik	Psychologist	Robiul Alam Robi	Chorki	Episode: "Mrs. Prohelika"	
2021	Dark Room	Pablo / Iftekhar Amin	Golam Sohrab Dodul	Cinematic		
2021	Ladies & Gentlemen	Special Appearance	Mostofa Sarwar Farooki	ZEE5		
2021	Boli	Sohrab Company	Shankha Dasgupta	Hoichoi		
2021	Jaago Bahey	Illyas	Siddiq Ahmed	Chorki	Episode: "Shobder Khwoab"	
2022	Pett Kata Shaw	Mahmud	Nuhash Humayun	Chorki	Episode: "Misti Kichu"	
2022	Karagar	David	Syed Ahmed Shawki	Hoichoi		
2023	Overtrump	Selim	Bashar Georgis	Chorki		
2024	Rumi	Rumi	Vicky Zahed	Hoichoi		
2024	Kalpurush		Salzar Rahman			
2025	Feu	Sunil	Sukorno Sahed Dhiman	Chorki		

== Accolades ==
As of 2024, Chowdhury is the recipient of multiple accolades, including three National Film Awards for Best Actor and seven Meril Prothom Alo awards: two for Best Actor, four for Best Actor (Critics' Choice) and one for Best Model (Male).

Year	Awards	Category	Work	Results	Ref.
2006	Meril Prothom Alo Awards	Best Model (male)	Maa	Won	
2007	Meril Prothom Alo Awards	Best Actor (Critics' Choice)	Rupkothar Golpo	Won	
2009	National Film Awards	Best Actor	Monpura	Won jointly with Ferdous	
2009	Meril Prothom Alo Awards	Best Actor	Monpura	Won	
2010	Meril Prothom Alo Awards	Best Actor (Critics' Choice)	Moner Manush	Won	
2016	Meril Prothom Alo Awards	Best Actor (Critics' Choice)	Aynabaji	Won	
2016	National Film Awards	Best Actor	Aynabaji	Won	
2018	Meril Prothom Alo Awards	Best Actor (Critics' Choice)	Debi	Won	
2021	Hoichoi Awards	Breakthrough Performance of the Year	Taqdeer and Boli	Won	
2021	Blender's Choice–The Daily Star Awards	Best male actor (popular category)	Taqdeer	Won	
2022	Meril Prothom Alo Awards	Best Actor	Hawa	Won	
2022	Meril Prothom Alo awards	Best Actor (Critics' Choice)	Dui Diner Duniya	Won	
2023	National Film Awards	Best Actor	Hawa	Won	
2023	Kolkata 20th Tele Cine Awards	Best Actor	Hawa	Won	
2023	ABP Ananda Shera Bangali Shommanona	Shera Bangali (Best Bengali)	—	Won	
2024	Suchitra Sen Bengali International Film Festival	Best Actor	Hawa	Won	
2026	BIFA Awards	Breakthrough Performance	Domm: Until The Last Breath	Won	
