= Meghdol =

Bengali rock band

Meghdol মেঘদল
- Origin: Dhaka, Bangladesh
- Genres: Indie rock; Alternative rock; folk rock; psychedelic rock
- Years active: 2003-present
- Members: Shibu Kumer Shil; Mejbaur Rahman Sumon; Rasheed Sharif Shoaib; Amjad Hossain; MG Kibria; Tanbeer Dawood Rony; Shourov Sarkar
- Past members: Masud hasan Ujjal; Joy; Asad

Meghdol (lit. 'Clouds') is a Bangladeshi indie rock band, known for its poetic urban-themed lyrics and theatrical musical arrangement. Founded in 2003, the band has released two studio albums.

== History ==
Meghdol was formed in 2003 by Shibu Kumer Shil, Mejbaur Rahman Sumon, Rasheed Sharif Shoaib, and Masud Hasan Ujjal, while they were studying Fine Arts at the University of Dhaka. The band's name was inspired by the Charles Baudelaire poem L'Étranger. The band released their eponymous album Meghdol, subtitled Droher Montre Bhalobasha, in 2004. The second album, Shohorbondi, came out in 2009, after which the band went on a nine-year hiatus.

Meghdol returned to the music scene in 2018 through the YouTube release of Esho amar shohore, a track from their planned third album Aluminium-er Dana. In October 2020, the band released a remastered version of their debut album Droher Montre Bhalobasha. In November 2021, the band was sued for allegedly hurting religious feelings by sampling a Muslim prayer chant in the song Om, featured in the remastered album, although the charges were withdrawn a week later. In July 2022, Meghdol released E Hawa, the fifth track of the album Aluminium-er Dana, as a tribute to the feature film Hawa, directed by Sumon, one of the band's founding members. The band's lead guitarist, Shoaib, despite his 2020 announcement to leave the band, played lead guitar on this track and participated in the subsequent tours and concerts to promote the movie.

== Members ==
=== Present members ===
- Shibu Kumer Shill: Vocals
- Mejbaur Rahman Sumon: Vocals
- Rasheed Sharif Shoaib: Guitars
- Tanbeer Dawood Rony: Piano, Organ
- MG Kibria: Bass
- Shourov Sarkar: Flute
- Amzad Hossain: Drums

=== Former members ===
- Masud Hasan Ujjal: Vocals
- Joy Prakash: Drums

== Discography ==
=== Album ===
- Meghdol - Droher Montre Bhalobasha (2004)
- Shohorbondi (2009)
- Aluminium Er Dana (2018–2022)

=== Singles ===
- Nefartiti (Neon Aloy Shagotom, 2007)
- Esho Amar Shohore (Aluminium Er Dana,2018)
- Na Bola Phul (Aluminium Er Dana, 2019)
- Maya Cycle (Aluminium Er Dana, )
- Tobu Mon (Aluminium Er Dana,)
- E Hawa (OST- HAWA, 2022)
- Bonbibi feat. Jahura Baul (Coke Studio Bangla, 2023)
- Aluminium Er Dana (Aluminium Er Dana, 2023)
