= Dui Diner Duniya =

- Film poster
- Directed by: Anam Biswas
- Written by: Anam Biswas; Ashraful Alam Shaon
- Starring: Chanchal Chowdhury; Fazlur Rahman Babu; Tania Brishty; Moushumi Hamid
- Cinematography: Sheikh Rajibul Islam
- Production company: Chorki
- Distributed by: Chorki
- Release date: 16 October 2022
- Running time: 85 minutes
- Country: Bangladesh
- Language: Bengali

Dui Diner Duniya (transl. The world of two days) (Bengali: দুই দিনের দুনিয়া), is a 2022 Bangladeshi Bengali film. This film was directed by Anam Biswas, the director of Debi, and written by Ashraful Alam Shaon.

== Plot ==
The story of the movie revolves around Samad, a truck driver, who one night spots a mysterious man, Jamshed, following him around. Samad encounters Jamshed and is surprised to find that Jamshed knows a lot about him. Upon accepting Samad's offer of a free ride, Jamshed confesses that he had come there from the future. He goes on to add that he had come to help Samad survive a grave catastrophe that was to take place soon. Samad, still suspicious of Jamshed, continues to play along. Gradually, a string of unfortunate events, triggered by Samad's past misdeeds, start to surface and he slowly gets to learn the true identity and motivation of Jamshed.

== Cast ==
- Chanchal Chowdhury as Samad
- Fazlur Rahman Babu as Jamshed
- Tania Brishty as Beauty
- Moushumi Hamid as Lota

== Music ==
No	Name	Singer	Lyrics	Music	Duration
1	Teka Pakhi	Masha Islam	Anam Biswas	Emon Chowdhury	3:15

== Critical reception ==
'Dui Diner Duniya' received mixed review from the critics. The acting performance of the main actors received generally positive reviews and so did the musical score. However, the overall impact of the story line was not equally well received. Fatin Hamam of The Daily Star gave a more positive review saying that the viewers may take some time to process the story, but it will stay with them. On the contrary, Mahbub Islam of The Financial Express felt that the movie, despite its strong acting and music, failed to hit the right spot.
