= Rupkothar Golpo =

- Directed by: Tauquir Ahmed
- Written by: Tauquir Ahmed
- Produced by: Impress Telefilm Limited
- Starring: Chanchal Chowdhury; Tauquir Ahmed; Mosharraf Karim; Humayun Faridi; Mamunur Rashid
- Cinematography: Tauquir Ahmed
- Edited by: Arghyakamal Mitra
- Music by: Bari Siddiqui
- Distributed by: Impress Telefilm Limited
- Release date: October 25, 2006
- Running time: 103 Minutes
- Country: Bangladesh
- Language: Bengali

Rupkothar Golpo: A Fairy Tale (Bengali: রূপকথার গল্প) is a 2006 Bangladeshi film directed by Tauquir Ahmed. Impress Telefilm Limited produced and distributed the film.

== Story ==
Rupkathar Golpo, is not a fairy tale as the title suggests, but rather a story of the human condition in current times. The film centres on a desperate mother (Taskin Sumi) whose child is lost. In the film a young man (Chanchal Chowdhury), fired on his first day at work, encounters a streetwalker with a child. To be able to buy some food for her baby, the girl decides to go with a truck driver (Tauquir Ahmed) leaving her child in the young man's care. The police however suspect the young man to be an abductor, seeing him with a baby that is apparently not his and he is taken to the police station.

After returning the girl cannot find her child and combs the city with the truck driver looking for the baby. The young man, incapable of articulating his pain, is an honest soul and being torn by responsibility and moral consequence cannot leave the child. He tries his best to save the baby. The truck driver starts gambling, loses everything and decides to bet on the girl. His partners in the gamble rape her while he is left senseless under the influence of alcohol.

Within this unremarkable premise lies the profoundly moving story of Rupkothar Golpo. Filmed in the ravages of contemporary life, the movie is a sharp portrayal of despair and hope, desperation and survival, loss and redemption, poignantly told in subtle actions and spare words. The film narrates a story of humanity, in all its imperfections and cruelty.

== Cast ==
- Chanchal Chowdhury
- Tauquir Ahmed
- Abul Hayat
- Humayun Faridi
- Dr. Enamul Haque
- Rahmat Ali
- Shabnam Parvin
- Ejajul Islam
- Hosne Ara Putul
- Taskin Sumi
- Mamunur Rashid
- Mosharraf Karim
- Tushar Khan
- Jhuna Chowdhury
- Saleh Ahmed

== Soundtrack ==
The music of the film was directed by Bari Siddiqui. lyrics were penned by Rabindranath Tagore, Nidhu Babu, Shahidullah Forayezi and Bari Siddiqui.

- "Kachher Manush Amay Phele" (part 1) - Bari Siddiqui
- "Kachher Manush Amay Phele" (part 2) - Bari Siddiqui
- "Hoilona Hoilona Amar Prem Sadhon" - Bari Siddiqui
- "Premer Ghuri Bin Batashe Ore" - Bari Siddiqui
- "Shoto Noto Shyamo Rai" - Bari Siddiqui
- "Mono Jaago Mongolo Loke" - Bipasha Hayat
- "Kar Tore Nishi Jaago" - Runa Laila

== Awards ==
This film won several awards including

Dhaka International Film Festival

- Audience Choice Award: Film

Meril Prothom Alo Awards

- Critics Choice Best Director - Tauquir Ahmed
- Critics Choice Best Actor - Chanchal Chowdhury

== See also ==
- Joyjatra
- Daruchini Dip
