= Pinik =

- Poster
- Bengali: পিনিক
- Literally: Intoxication
- Directed by: Jahid Jewel
- Written by: Akhiuzzaan Manon
- Produced by: Ashraf Kitu
- Starring: Adar Azad; Shobnom Bubly; Keya Al Jannah
- Cinematography: Forhad Hosen; Ebad Alim
- Production company: Euro Bangla Entertainment
- Distributed by: Jaaz Multimedia
- Release date: 28 May 2026
- Running time: 141 minutes
- Country: Bangladesh
- Language: Bengali

Pinik (Bengali: পিনিক, lit. 'Intoxication') is a 2026 Bangladeshi action film produced by Ashraf Kitu under the banner of Euro Bangla Entertainment, directed by Jahid Jewel and written by Akhiuzjaman Manon. It stars Adar Azad and Shobnom Bubly in the lead roles.

The cinematography for the film Pinik began in November 2024. It marks the directorial debut of director Jahid Jewel. The Adar-Bubli duo previously worked together in the films Talaash and Local. This is their third time sharing the screen.

== Cast ==
- Ador Azad as Pasha
- Shobnom Bubly
- Keya Al Jannah
- Ali Raj
- Fazlur Rahman Babu
- Azad Abul Kalam
- Shimul Khan
- Ashraf Kitu
- Somu Chowdhury
- Momena Chowdhury
- Ak Azad Shetu
- Sharif Siraj
- Nafis Ahmed
- Sanjid Rahman Khan
- Sabiha Rinku
- Ashraf Tulu
- Masud Parvez
- Nabila Alom Polin
- Aditi Ahmed (Child Artist)
- Lily (A Dog)
- Shanjida Jahan Pushpo as special appearance

== Music ==
The first song "Chumma" was released on 25 May 2026, which is an item song. It was written by Shimul Khan, composed and sung by Akash Sen and Trisha Chatterjee. The second song "Aadkhana Chand" was released on 27 May 2026. It was sung and composed by Zia Raj. The singer opposite Zia Raj was Konal. The writer of the song is Zahid Nirab.

== Release ==
The film was released on 28 May 2026, presented by Jazz Multimedia in four theaters in Bangladesh.

== Controversy ==
The film's producer has been accused of preparing for the release of the film without paying most of the crew.

== Reception ==
The film received mixed reviews from the audience and critics. Reviewing the film for Jugantor, FI Deepu wroted, Pinik as a fully commercial entertainer that successfully engaged the audience through its blend of comedy, romance, and action, though he noted that the narrative lacked depth. Writing for Bonik Barta, Wahidur Rahman noted that, while Pinik had generated significant positive anticipation prior to its release, it ultimately failed to meet audience expectations upon its theatrical debut. Rahman Moti of Bangla Movie Database praised Shobnom Bubly's performance for standing out despite the hero-centric norms of Bangladeshi commercial cinema and noted that weak screenwriting and narrative execution limited the film's overall impact.
