= Tania Brishty =

Bangladeshi model and actress

- তানিয়া বৃষ্টি
- Born: Tania Akter Brishty; 5 March; Munshiganj District, Bangladesh
- Education: Siddheshwari Girls College
- Occupations: Model, actress
- Years active: 2012–present
- Spouse: Sabbir Chowdhury (m. 2018; div. 2018)

Tania Akter Brishty (Bengali: তানিয়া আক্তার বৃষ্টি) is a Bangladeshi model and actress. She was the second runner-up in the Veet Channel i Top Model competition. She has acted in numerous Bangladeshi TV dramas. She made her big screen debut in the film Ghashful in 2015.

== Early life and education ==
Brishty was born on 5 March in Munshiganj District, Bangladesh, to Helena Begum and Md. Suruj Mia. Her father worked abroad in Kuwait, so she did not see him often. She has an older sister, Sonia Akter Jyoti.

Brishty attended Begum Rahima Adarsh Uchcha Balika Vidyalaya and completed her Higher Secondary Certificate from Habibullah Bahar College.

== Career ==
Brishty was the second runner-up in the Veet-Channel i Top Model beauty contest in 2012. After that, she acted in a television drama, but it was not aired. In 2013, she was a model in a television commercial for Grameenphone. Her career took off after she did a commercial for Asian Duplex Town, a housing development in Purbachal, in which she bickered with Shakib Khan. More commercials and television dramas followed, but she found herself typecast as a "quarrelsome character" who argued or talked loudly.

The first television drama in which she appeared was Jhunkir Mata Achi. Her ambition, however, was to be in films. She made her big screen debut in 2015, starring in Akram Khan's art film Ghashful. Her performance in it was praised. Later that year she appeared in the commercial romance Lover Number One directed by Farooq Omar. She worked in two other films that year, S. M. Shakil's Dorjar Opashe and Sohanur Rahman Sohan's Obala Nari, but the former has never been released, and the latter was never finished. In late 2016, she appeared in Jodi Tumi Jante directed by the team of Nodi and Firoz. Meanwhile, she continued acting on television and studied marketing at Siddheshwari Girls College.

Brishty announced her engagement to Sabbir Chowdhury, an expatriate television producer living in Sydney, in June 2017. They had met in the course of work. They divorced early in 2018.

Brishty considers Jakiul Islam Ripon's 2022 television drama Pinikei Jhinik, in which she starred with Mosharraf Karim, an inflection point in her career. She received great audience acclaim for her performance, and producers and directors began offering her more varied and challenging roles.

== Works ==
=== Filmography ===
year	Title	Director	Role	Note	Ref(s)
2015	Ghashful	Akram Khan	Tania	Film debut	
2015	Lover Number One	Omar Faruq	Badshah's cousin		
2015	Dorjar Opashe	S. M. Shakil	Julie	Unreleased	
2015	Obala Nari	Sohanur Rahman Sohan	Jhumka	Unfinished	
2016	Jodi Tumi Jante	Nodi and Firoz			
2019	Goyendagiri	Nasim Sahonik	Detective Cherry		

=== Television ===
- Jhunkir Mata Achi
- Pagla Ghoda
- Jodi Na Bolo
- Face (serial)
- Pramila Cricket Coaching
- Alor Pothe
- Offscreen (serial)
- Photocopy
- Sade Barotare Bhoot
- Bonsai
- Nine and a Half
- Pokay Khaowa Kuri
- Bhoyonkor Ek Chutir Din
- Samrat (serial)
- Ek Pa Du Pa (serial)
- Housewife (serial)
- Somadhan (serial)
- Mon Te Dore Nay (serial)
- Ora Bokhate
- Kagoye Likhna
- Palki (serial)
- Bachelor.com
- Pratishod
- Lucky Thirteen (serial)
- Comedy 420 (serial)
- Roser Hari (serial)
- Mushkil Asan Private Limited (serial)
- Apchander Saatdin
- Shesh Baji
- Bhaager Gari
- Keu Nei
- Hugna Nizam
- Bhaiya Chhayaka Khaite China
- Baek to the Pavilion
- Love with Benefits
- Compare
- Pack Up
- Rocky Bhai
- XL
- Jamai Amar Sera Radhuni
- Nirdosh (serial)
- Jonom Jonom
- Pinikei Jhinik
- Kobja
- Powerful Couple
- Mr Kipta
- Chobal
- Friends (serial)
- Bhaiya Romantik Hote Chai
- Load Shedding
- Love Torture
- Head Phone
- Psycho+Logical
- Checkmate
- Perfect Match
- Kavitar Char Lain
- ICU
- Aarai Talaq
- Sab Dosh Hossain Ali
- Jaigai Khai Jaigai Break
- Latif Daptari[
- Kacher Manush
- Chowdhuri and Sons
- Dhandabaaz
- Local Jamai
- Bandhu Naki Shatru
- Ami Bachte Chai Na
- Galpata Purono
- Bodyguard
- Bhai Chhyaka Khay
- Baba Hote Chai
- Kerani Akkas
- Gariwala
- Sada Kala
- My Name Is Fakir
- Kichhu Kotha Bolar Chhilo
- Abhimaani Tumi Ghartera Ami
- Ektu Boka
- Chinki Na Mingki
- Loose Connection
- Prem Abujh
- Hasite Fhani
- Came from Barisal
- Chele Dhara
- Shesh Porjonto Tomake Chai
- Jonakira Ai Sharhar Aar Jalye Na
- Cheyechilam
- Chokhta Amake Dao
- Chabiwala
- Bou Er Mon Police Police

=== Web ===
- Dui Diner Duniya (web film)
