= Che'r Cycle =

2009 play by Mamunur Rashid

- A scene from the drama depicting Mamunur Rashid as Che Guevara
- Written by: Mamunur Rashid
- Characters: Che Guevara

Premiere
- Date premiered: 2009 by Bangla Theatre

Che'r Cycle (2009) is a Bangladeshi Bengali-language stage drama written by Mamunur Rashid, who himself played the main character, directed by Faiz Zahir staged by Bangla Theatre from Dhaka as a tribute to Che Guevara.

== Plot ==
The drama begins with a scene where two men, Ranjan and Shubhro, and a woman named Soheli, were sitting in a beach and having a conversation. Each one of three characters interprets the world in his or her own way. Suddenly with a trance, they transform into Che Guevara, Aleida March, the wife of Guevara, Fidel Castro, and Raúl Castro. The events of this play continually switch between times and places and the characters assimilate into each other. The drama captures that time when Che Guevara is on his way to start a revolution. But soon, another character Ranjan gets assimilated with the character Che. Che's understandings and views on life help these three to see the life from a new angle.

== Cast ==
The cast of the drama included–

- Mamunur Rashid as Che Guevara
- Chanchal Chowdhury
- Rubli Chowdhury as Aledia

== Making ==
The Bengali drama is inspired by Che of Asian People's Theatre (Hong Kong). Other than directing the play Faiz Zahir also designed the set, costume and light. This play was a tribute to Che Guevara. Playwright Mamunur Rashid told–

People like Che existed in every era, in every society. Born in Argentina, Che transcended the geographical border and became synonymous of protest for the oppressed throughout the world. In this 'post-nationalist' era, we need another Che to fight globalisation. Our play places Che in our time where he moves forward upholding his flag of revolution to fight fundamentalism and oppression.

== Reception ==
The drama received positive remarks from critics. Starting from 2003 it has been performed both in Bangladesh an abroad. Bangladeshi poet Nirmalendu Goon wrote a poem Che'r Cycle" after watching this drama. Bangladeshi newspaper The Daily Star wrote in their review– "The extraordinary performance of eminent theatre artiste and playwright Mamunur Rashid; Chanchal Chowdhury and Rubly Chowdhury enthralled the huge audience gathered at the venue."

== See also ==
- Nemesis by Nurul Momen
