= Fazlur Rahman Babu =

Bangladeshi actor and singer

- ফজলুর রহমান বাবু
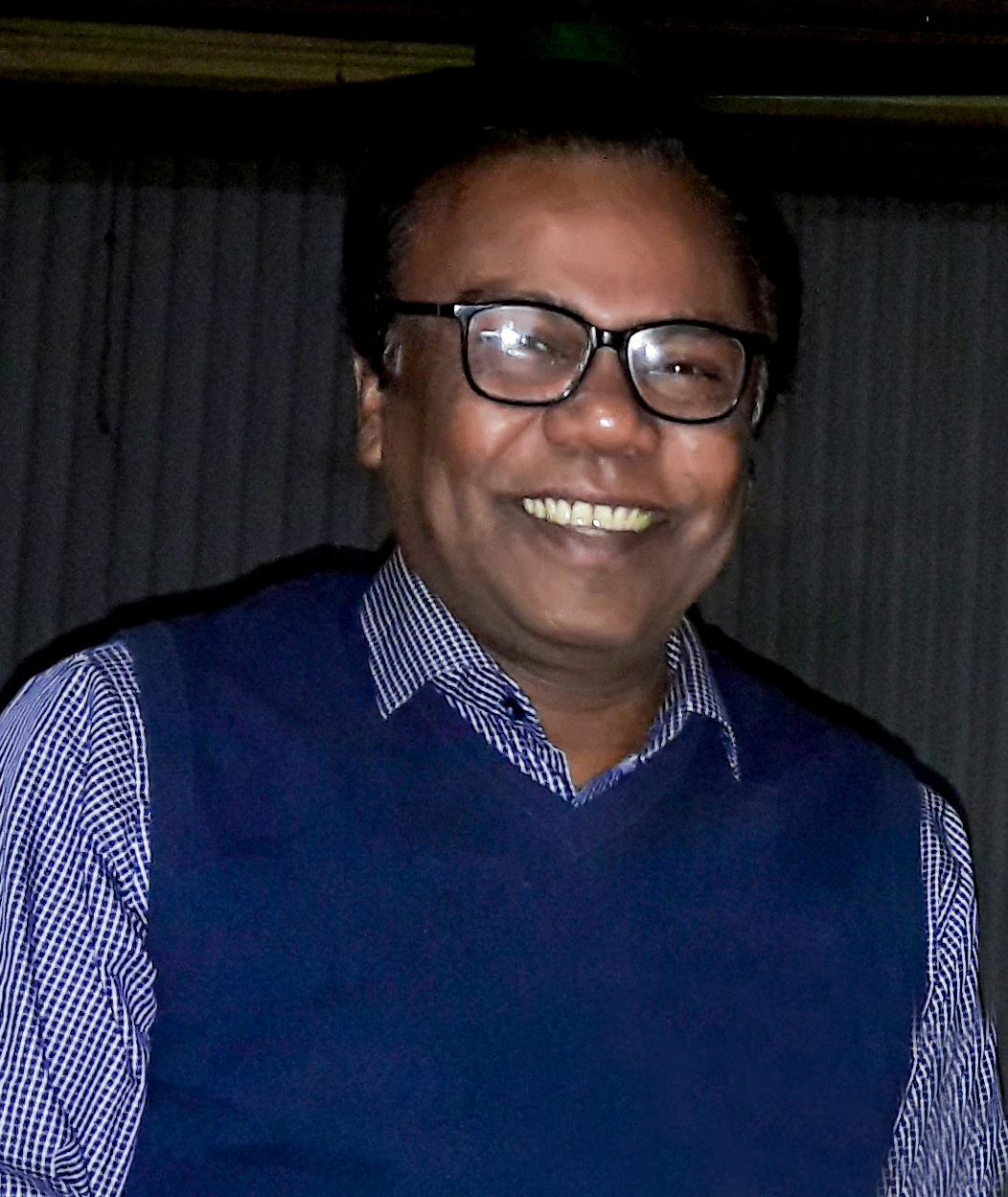
- Babu in 2019
- Born: 22 August 1960 (age 66); Faridpur, East Pakistan, Pakistan
- Occupations: Actor, singer
- Years active: 1983–present
- Notable work: Monpura; Oggatonama; Daruchini Dip
- Spouse: Kazi Roksana Akhtar (m. 1992)

Fazlur Rahman Babu (born 22 August 1960) is a Bangladeshi actor and singer. He has won the Best Supporting Actor at Bangladeshi National Film Awards a record five times for his roles in Shonkhonaad (2004), Meyeti Ekhon Kothay Jabe (2017), Fagun Haway (2019), Bishwoshundori (2020) and Nonajoler Kabbo (2021). He also won Best Performance in a Comic Role for Gohin Baluchor (2017).

== Early life ==
Babu was born on 22 August 1960 at Faridpur district in the then East Pakistan. He completed his school and college life in Faridpur. His father was a service holder, thereby he had to roam from one place to another around the country. Babu was interested in acting from his childhood. In Faridpur, he joined Boishakhi Natya Gosthi pursuing to build up a career in the media arena.

== Career ==
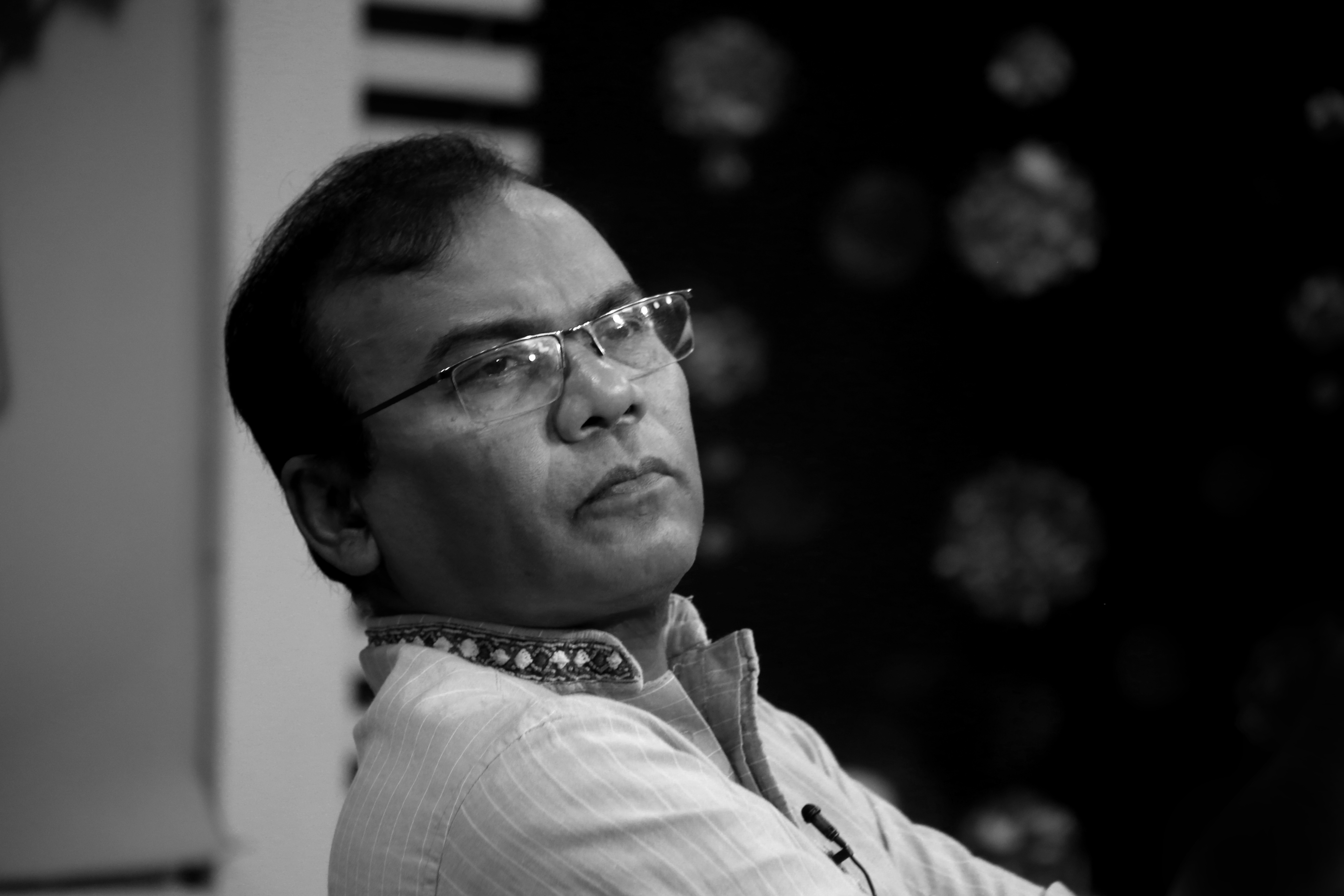
Babu in 2017

=== Acting and banking ===
Babu started his acting career in 1978 when he joined the theatre group Baishakhi Natya Ghosthi in Faridpur. That same year, Babu acted for the first time in a national drama festival. Meanwhile, he joined the Agrani Bank and, in 1983, transferred his banking job to Dhaka, the capital of Bangladesh, where he also joined Mamunur Rashid's Aranyak Natyadal theatre group and debuted his acting with a role in Saat Purusher Rin. Some of his performances in this theatre group include Nankar Pala, Pathar and Moyur Shinghashan.

Babu started his television acting career in the soap opera Mrittu Khuda (1991), produced by Kazi Abu Zafar Siddique, on Bangladesh Television (BTV). However, it was his role of Poran Majhi television drama Itikatha (1991), written by Rashid, that secured him further roles in dramas such as Shundari and Danab. Babu also acted with Bengali film Daruchini Dip, directed by Tauquir Ahmed, while Humayun Ahmed was story, dialogue and scriptwriter.

Babu has become popular for his humorous characters, but his early career in stage dramas like Danab and Jay Jayanti was in serious roles.

Babu continued to work for television and theatre simultaneously until 2000, when he stopped theatre work as television took nearly twenty-five days per month. Babu made his theatrical film debut with Abdullah al Mamun's Bihanga between 2000 and 2001.

Babu has also been featured in an Indian film.

=== Singing ===
Babu emerged as a singer when he performed two songs in the film Monpura. After that, he became known to everyone as a playback singer. He published his first solo music album, Indubala, in 2009, which became popular in the whole country. He also sang four songs on the mixed album Monchor in 2008.

== Criticism ==
Babu took a stand for the government during the repression of the dictatorship Awami League government on the students in the quota reform movement that took place in 2024. During the movement, a group of pro-autocracy Awami artists, including Babu, were active against the movement in a WhatsApp group called 'Alo Ashbei' led by actor Ferdous. After the non-cooperation movement, on September 3, 2024, some screenshots related to that WhatsApp group were spread on social media.

== Works ==
=== Films ===
Year	Film	Role	Notes	Ref.
2004	Shankhonad	Fazlu		
2006	Na Bolona	Monir		
2007	Aha!	Solaiman		
2007	Daruchini Dip	Monir		
2007	Swopnodanay	Siraj	Bangladesh's submission to the 80th Academy Awards for the Best Foreign Language Film	
2009	Monpura	Pori's father	Winner - Bangladesh National Film Awards for Best actor	
2016	The Unnamed	Kifayet Uddin Pramanik	Winner - Bangladesh National Film Awards for Best Actor	
2017	Haldaa	Monu Miya		
2017	Meyeti Ekhon Kothay Jabe		Winner - Bangladesh National Film Awards for Best Actor	
2017	Nuru Mia O Tar Beauty Driver	Nuru Mia		
2018	Swapnajaal	Aynal Gazi		
2019	Fagun Haway	Chandor	Winner - Bangladesh National Film Award for Best Supporting Actor	
2019	Sitara	Jibon Bepari	Indian Bengali Film	
2019	Mayaboti			
2020	Bishwoshundori			
2021	Mission Extreme	Dibba Babu		
2021	Raat Jaga Phool			
2022	Dui Diner Duniya	Jamshed	Webfilm on Chorki	
2023	Mohanagar 2	Intelligence Officer Babar	Web series on Hoichoi	
2023	Mujib: The Making of a Nation	Khondaker Mostaq Ahmad		
2024	Omar	Baker's Father		
2024	Toofan	Arifin		
2024	840	Muzaffar		
2025	Jole Jwole Tara	Tara's Father		
2025	Borbaad	Sabuj Mia		
2025	NeelChokro	Samir Kanti		
2025	Nandini			
2026	Pressure Cooker	Police Officer Ruhul Amin		
2026	Pinik			
2026	Beyond the Mast	Maqbool		
2026	Master	Local political figure	World premiere at the 17th London Indian Film Festival (LIFF)	

=== Television ===
Year	Title	Director	Notes
1991	Mrittu Khuda	Abu Zafar Siddiqui	Novel (Mrityukshuda) by Kazi Nazrul Islam
1994	Itikotha	Rashid	
	Badol Diner Prothom Kodom Ful	Humayun Ahmed	
	Jay Jayanti		
	Velki	Ali Akram Tojor	
	Spnuj Daoai	Sumon Anwar	
	Bine Sutor Mala	Sumon Anwar	
	Buri Chad Geche Bujhi Bene Jole Vese	Manik Manobik	
2006	Kacher Manush	Afsana Mimi & Amlan Biswas	
2004-2005	69	Mostofa Sarwar Farooki	
	Pani	Noyeem Imtiaz Neyamul	
	Ogni Roth	Rajibul Islam Rajib	
	Gorvodharini	Naresh Vuiya	
	Bao Kurani	Bikram Khan	
	Ferari Pakhi	Richi Solaiman, Anisur Rahman Milon	
	Azrael	Salauddin Lavlu	
	Ajob Chhele	Golam Sohorab Dudul	
	Rahman Gayen	Sagar Jahan	
	Rater Otithi		
	Bag	Sayed Masum Reza	
	Chidhel Chor	Shamim Zaman	
	Poshu Daktar	Salauddin Lavlu	
	Chor Tithi Ar Ami	Mijanur Rahman Babu	
	Bhat Ghum	Akram Khan	
	Amader Hatkhola	Sagar Jahan	
	Dui Batpar	Mizanur Rahman Labu	
	Bela Obelar Golpo	Ali Ahmed	
	Photok	Moniruzzaman Lipon	
	Rajlokkhi Opera	Anowar Hossain	
	Blind Road	Borhan Khan	
	Mehman	Al-Hazen	
2021	Mashrafe Junior	Sazzad Sumon	

== Discography ==
=== Solo ===
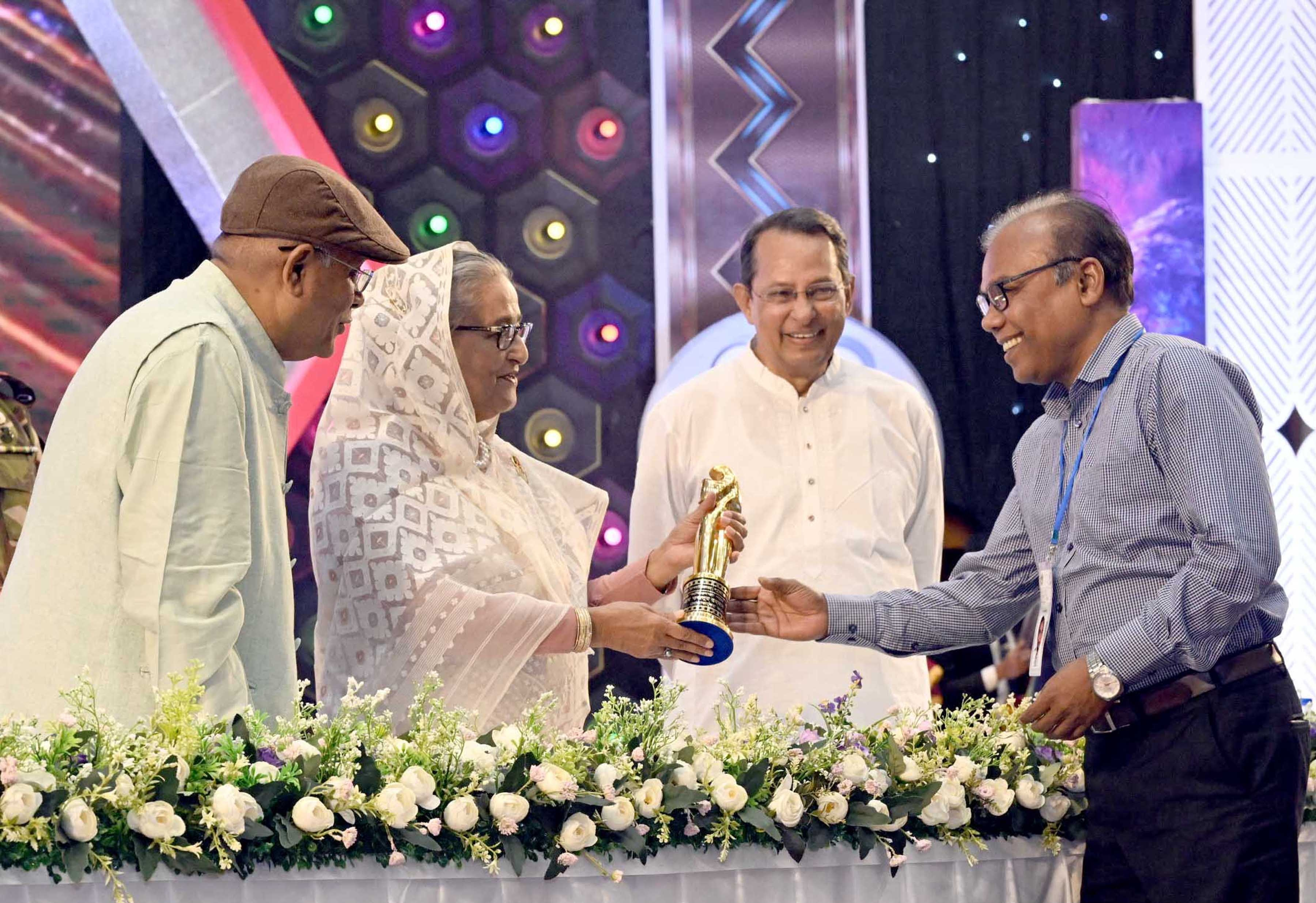
- Babu receives National Film Awards in 2021.
  Indubala

=== Duet ===
- Mon Chor

=== Film scores ===
- Shonkonaad (2004)
- Daruchini Dip (2007)
- Monpura (2009)
- Ghetu Putro Komola (2012)
- Pakhal (2013)
- Oggatonama (2016)
- Meyeti Ekhon Kothay Jabe (2016)
- Gohin Balucor (2017)
- Poramon 2(2018)
- Sitara (2019)
- Fagun Haway (2019)
- Bishwoshundori (2020)
- Nonajoler Kabbo (2020)
