= Hawa (2022 Bangladeshi film) =

- Theatrical release poster
- Directed by: Mejbaur Rahman Sumon
- Screenplay by: Mejbaur Rahman Sumon; Sukorno Shahed Dhiman; Jaheen Faruque Ameen
- Story by: Mejbaur Rahman Sumon
- Produced by: Anjan Chowdhury Pintu
- Starring: Chanchal Chowdhury; Nazifa Tushi; Sariful Razz
- Cinematography: Kamrul Hasan Khosru; Tanveer Ahmed Shovon
- Edited by: Sazal Alok
- Music by: Emon Chowdhury; Rashed Sharif Shoaib
- Production companies: Sun Music & Motion Pictures; Facecard Production; Bien Ou Bien Productions
- Distributed by: Jaaz Multimedia; Reliance Entertainment; Swapna Scarecrow; Desi Entertainment Paris; Amazon Studios
- Release date: 29 July 2022 (Bangladesh)
- Running time: 130 mins
- Country: Bangladesh
- Language: Bengali
- Budget: ৳5 million (equivalent to ৳6.1 million or US$49,000 in 2024)
- Box office: ৳160 million (equivalent to ৳190 million or US$1.6 million in 2024)

Hawa (lit. 'Wind') is a 2022 Bangladeshi mystery-drama film written and directed by Mejbaur Rahman Sumon. The film was produced by Sun Music and Motion Pictures Limited. The film stars Chanchal Chowdhury, Nazifa Tushi, Sariful Razz, Sumon Anowar, Shohel Mondol, Nasir Uddin Khan and Rizvi Rizu among others.

The film was released on 29 July 2022 in 24 cinemas. Hawa received widespread critical acclaim for its story, direction, visuals, cinematography, sound design, music and cast performances. It is often regarded as one of the best Bangladeshi films ever made for its unique blend of folklore, myth, and modern cinema. It was also a commercial success grossing over ৳16 crore worldwide becoming the highest grossing Bangladeshi film of 2022.

It was submitted as the Bangladeshi nomination for 'Best International Feature Film' at the 95th Academy Awards but was not nominated. It was shortlisted for 80th Golden Globe Awards.

== Synopsis ==
A group of seasoned fishermen leave from Cox's Bazar to make their regular catch, but instead discover they have caught a beautiful and mysterious young girl. They then come to realise they are not able to catch fish any more and tension begins to rise.

== Cast ==
- Chanchal Chowdhury as Chaan Majhi
- Nazifa Tushi as Gulti
- Sariful Razz as Iba (Ibrahim)
- Sumon Anowar as Eja
- Shohel Mondol as Urkes
- Nasir Uddin Khan as Nagu
- Rizvi Rizu as Parkes
- Mahmud Alam as Mora
- Bablu Bose as Foni

== Production ==
Principal photography of the film started on October 13, 2019. The film was shot on St. Martin's Island in the Bay of Bengal. It was shot by Monpura cinematographer SA Kamrul Hasan Khasru.

== Music ==
Hawa

Soundtrack album by Emon Chowdhury, Hashim Mahmud, Arfan Mredha Shiblu, Meghdol, Basudeb Das Baul
- Released: 2022
- Recorded: 2020
- Genre: Film music
- Language: Bengali
- Producer: Emon Chowdhury

Emon Chowdhury chronology
Paap Punno (2022)	Hawa (2022)	Surongo (2023)

Hawa Soundtrack – Track listing
No.	Title	Lyrics	Singers	Length
1.	"Shada Shada Kala Kala"	Hashim Mahmud	Arfan Mredha Shiblu	3:55
2.	"E Hawa"	Shibu Kumar Shil, Mejbaur Rahman Sumon	Meghdol (Shibu Kumar Shil, Mejbaur Rahman Sumon)	5:55
3.	"Aatta Baje Deri Korish Na"	Basudeb Das Baul	Basudeb Das Baul	4:01

== Release ==
=== Theatrical ===
The film was theatrically released on 29 July 2022 in Bangladesh. It received positive reviews from critics, with praise for its story and Chanchal Chowdhury's performance. It was released in Australia and New Zealand on 13 August 2022 and in the United States and Canada on 2 September 2022. It was shown for more than 100 days in the Bangladeshi movie theatres. It released in West Bengal on the scheduled day in 34 cinemas. It was released in Delhi, Haryana, Maharashtra and Uttar Pradesh on 6 January 2023.

=== Distribution ===
On 7 December 2022, Reliance Entertainment announced that they and CEPL had become the distributors of Hawa and the film will be released on 16 December in West Bengal and 30 December across India.

=== Screening ===
In late October, Hawa was screened in Nandan, Kolkata on the occasion of the 4th Bangladesh film festival. It was invited to the 28th Kolkata International Film Festival in 'Special Screening' section and was screened on 16 December 2022.

=== Home media ===
Hawa was digitally premiered in Bangladesh through iScreen from 16 March 2023. After that, it was also digitally premiered in India and Singapore through SonyLIV from 7 July 2023. In India, this film is available in four dubbed versions (Hindi, Tamil, Telugu and Malayalam) along with its original Bengali audio.

== Controversies ==
After the release of the film, some on social media claimed that the film was a remake of Sea Fog, but the director denied these claims saying that the subject of Sea Fog is human trafficking and which is not featured in this story. Chanchal Chowdhury claims it is an original story film while some call it a plagiarized version of Abhijan film directed by Razzak.

The film was also accused of violating the Wildlife Protection Act 2012, where Chanchal Chowdhury was seen eating the meat of a starling. The director denied the claim but the wildlife crime unit registered a case against him on August 17. After 11 days, the wildlife crime unit applied the court to withdraw the case and expressed their desire to fix the issue through discussions with the production team. Nargis Sultana, the plaintiff in the case, was arraigned by the Ministry of Information and Broadcasting on August 29 for filing the case.

A legal notice was issued on 22 August 2022 to stop and ban the screening of the film citing violation of wildlife conservation laws, use of obscene language and violent murder scenes. On 29 October 2022, another case was made against producer and Chanchal Chowdhury for not showing anti-smoking warning in the film.

== Reception ==
=== Critical response ===
Hasib Ur Rashid Ifti, a columnist for The Daily Star praised its cinematography and color grading. He also praised the acting of Chanchal and Nasir. Saykot Kabir Shayok from The Business Standard praised its dialogue and background music and said: "Hawa is reportedly houseful across the country on the first day and I would say it is truly worth the hype." According to columnist Ahsan Kabir, it is the most talked film of Cinema of Bangladesh in 2022. According to him, the song "Tumi Bondhu Kala Pakhi" from this film takes people to another world and he appreciated the song. According to Tanmoy Pal of Ajker Patrika, the best part of this film is its actors. He felt the film's dialogues were uninteresting and the character named Gulati lacked variety. According to Indradatta Basu of Anandabazar Patrika, Hawa, the film was made with care and highlighted the plight of a woman in a male-dominated society and critiqued patriarchy politically. According to her, the story would have been able to reveal its multi-dimensionality if the character of Gulti had been silent throughout. According to Basu, as a thriller film, it failed to create a thrill. Alam Khorshed of Bangla Tribune appreciated the director's political and social relevance of the country's folk mythology in the film. According to him the film has a touch of excellence in every aspect.

=== Response from India ===
After the film was released in Nandan, Kolkata on the occasion of the 4th Bangladesh Film Festival, audiences there flocked to see it, a rarity in the city in the past few decades. There it was decided to screen the film in four shows. But two more shows were extended due to the interest of the residents to watch the film. Indian film director Raj Chakraborty praised the acting, cinematography and direction of Hawa. Those who were unable to watch the film in Kolkata demanded that it be released in movie theatres in West Bengal.

=== Box office ===
Hawa grossed est. US$213,461 (৳2.035 crore) in the United States and Canada till 6 September 2022, making it 27th film in the US Top Chart. On 22 October 2022, it was reported by The Daily Star that the multiplexes in Bangladesh sold tickets of the film Hawa worth of more than ৳14 crore. It earned ₹34,000 in first week of its release from West Bengal.

== Awards and nominations ==
Date of ceremony	Award	Category	Nominee(s)	Result	Ref.
17 January 2023	Dhaka International Film Festival	Special audiences award	Mejbaur Rahman Sumon	Won	
4 March 2023	BIFA Award	Best Promising Star (Female)	Nazifa Tushi	Won	
8 September 2023	Meril-Prothom Alo Awards	Best Film Actor	Chanchal Chowdhury	Won	
8 September 2023	Meril-Prothom Alo Awards	Best Singer	Erfan Mridha Siblu	Won	
8 September 2023	Meril-Prothom Alo Awards	Best Newcomer Actor	Rizvi Rijhu	Nominated	
8 September 2023	Meril-Prothom Alo Awards	Best Film (Critics)	Ajay Kumar Kundu	Won	
8 September 2023	Meril-Prothom Alo Awards	Best Film Director (Critics)	Mejbaur Rahman Sumon	Won	
8 September 2023	Meril-Prothom Alo Awards	Best Film Actress (Critics)	Nazifa Tushi	Won	
31 October 2023	National Film Award	Best Actor	Chanchal Chowdhury	Won	
31 October 2023	National Film Award	Best Sound Recordist	Ripon Nath	Won	

== See also ==
- List of submissions to the 95th Academy Awards for Best International Feature Film
- List of Bangladeshi submissions for the Academy Award for Best International Feature Film
