= Mamunur Rashid =

Bangladeshi actor

- মামুনুর রশিদ
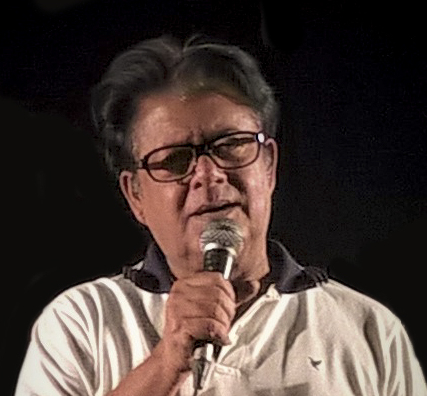
- Rashid at Rajshahi College (2017)
- Born: 29 February 1948 (age 78); Tangail District, East Bengal, Dominion of Pakistan
- Spouse: Gawhar Ara Mamun
- Relatives: Kamrul Hasan Khan (brother)

Mamunur Rashid (born 29 February 1948) is a Bangladeshi actor, director and scriptwriter. He was awarded Ekushey Padak in 2012 and Bangla Academy Literary Award in 1982 by the government of Bangladesh.

== Early life and education ==
Mamunur Rashid was born on 29 February 1948 in the village Bhabandatta in Ghatail Upazila of Tangail District in the then East Bengal, Dominion of Pakistan to Rokeya Khanam. He is the eldest of five siblings. He completed his SSC from Bolla Coronation High School and a Diploma in Civil Engineering from Dhaka Polytechnic Institute. After diploma, he passed BA and MA in political science from the University of Dhaka.

== Career ==
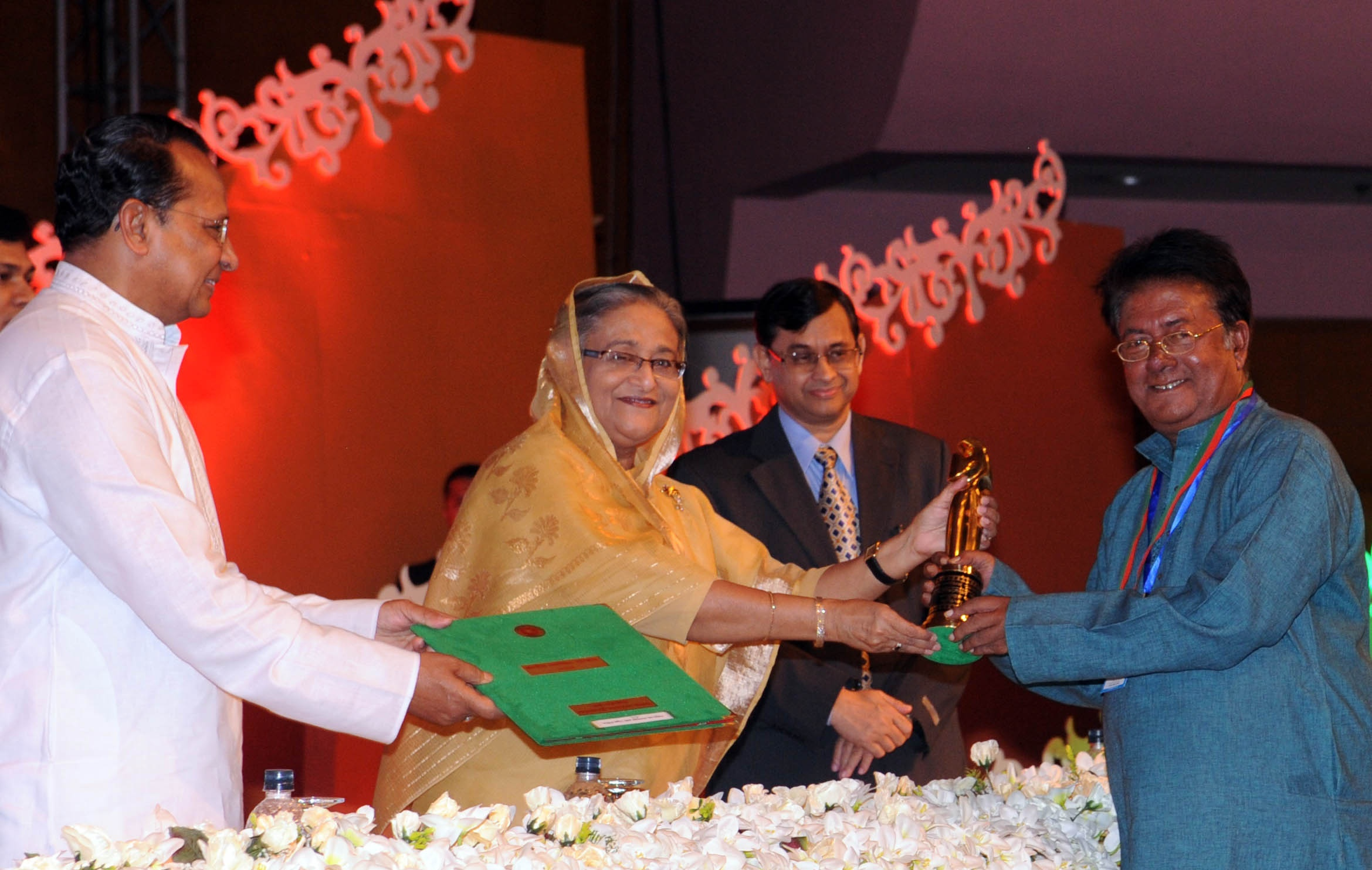
Mamunur Rashid receives National Film Awards from the then Prime Minister of Bangladesh, Sheikh Hasina in 2015.

Rashid moved to Dhaka in 1963. He started writing drama plays in the 1960s. He founded Aranyak Natyadal in 1972. He served as the chief secretary of the troupe. One of the most notable production of his group is Rarang which deals with the life of Santal. its another production is Ebong Biddyasagar. Another stage play, titled, Che'r Cycle was written and performed by him.

Rashid performed in television plays "Suprobhat Dhaka", "Somoy Osomoy", "Ekhane Nongor" and "Pachar" and in films Monpura (2009), Mrittika Maya (2013) and Nekabborer Mohaproyan (2014).

The radio plays Rashid performed in include Kabor (1972) and Paruler Shangshar (2011).

Rashid performed in Mostofa Sarwar Farooki's web series Ladies & Gentlemen.

In May 2025, an attempted murder case was filed against Rashid over a student of Alia Madrasa getting injured in Old Dhaka during protests against Prime Minister Sheikh Hasina in August 2024.

== Personal life ==
Rashid was married to Gawhar Ara Mamun (d. 2024).

== Works ==
=== Television ===
- Kacher Manush (2006)

=== Films ===
- Adhiar (2003)
- Monpura (2009)
- Mrittika Maya (2013)
- Ekatturer Khudiram (2014)
- Harijon (2014)
- Nekabborer Mohaproyan (2014)
- Nodijon (2015)
- Shankhachil (2016)
- Bhuban Majhi (2017)
- The Cage (2017)
- Meyeti Ekhon Kothay Jabe (2017)
- Shesh Kotha (2017)
- Sultana Bibiana (2017)
- Alta Banu (2018)
- Ekhane Nongor (2023), Web film on Rtv Plus
- Beauty Circus (unreleased)
- Borbaad (2025) as Naved Khan
