= Meril-Prothom Alo Award for Best TV Actress =

Annual Bangladeshi TV award

- Awarded for: Best Performance by a Television Actress in a Leading Role
- Country: Bangladesh
- Presented by: Meril-Prothom Alo
- First award: Bipasha Hayat (1999)
- Currently held by: Mehazabien Chowdhury, Buker Ba Pashe (2019)

Meril-Prothom Alo Award for Best TV Actress is given by Meril-Prothom Alo as part of its annual Meril-Prothom Alo Awards for Bengali television actress.

== Multiple winners ==
- 6 Wins: Nusrat Imrose Tisha
- 3 Wins: Bipasha Hayat
- 2 Wins: Shomi Kaiser, Aupee Karim, Tareen Jahan, Jaya Ahsan, Mehazabien Chowdhury

== Multiple nominees ==
The following actresses have received multiple Best TV Actress nominations (* indicates no wins):

Nominations	Actress
13	Nusrat Imrose Tisha
7	Jaya Ahsan
7	Sumaiya Shimu
5
5	Tareen Jahan
4	Bipasha Hayat
4	Shomi Kaiser
4	Bidya Sinha Saha Mim*
4	Mehazabien Chowdhury
3
3	Afsana Mimi*
3	Aupee Karim
3	Tania Ahmed
2
2	Rumana Rashid Ishita

== Winners and nominees ==
Table key
‡	Indicates the winner

=== 1990s ===
Year	Photos of winners	Actress	Role(s)	Film	Ref.
1998 (1st)		Bipasha Hayat ‡			

=== 2000s ===
Year	Photos of winners	Actress	Role(s)	Film	Ref.
1999 (2nd)		Bipasha Hayat ‡			
1999 (2nd)		Afsana Mimi			
1999 (2nd)		Shomi Kaiser			
2000 (3rd)		Shomi Kaiser ‡			
2001 (4th)		Shomi Kaiser ‡	Nilanjana	Nilanjana (2001)	
2001 (4th)		Afsana Mimi		Bandhan (2001)	
2001 (4th)		Tareen Jahan		Dhushor Canvas (2001)	
2001 (4th)		Bipasha Hayat		Bipratip (2001)	
2002 (5th)		Bipasha Hayat ‡		Bishkanta (2002)	
2002 (5th)		Afsana Mimi		Hawaghar (2002)	
2002 (5th)		Rumana Rashid Ishita		Bipashar Jonno Bhalobasha (2002)	
2002 (5th)		Shomi Kaiser		Valobasar Sukh Dukkho (2002)	
2003 (6th)		Aupee Karim ‡			
2004 (7th)		Ipshita Shrabanti ‡		Josnar Full (2004)	
2004 (7th)		Aupee Karim		Ekanno Borti (2004)	
2004 (7th)		Tania Ahmed		Ronger Manush (2004)	
2005 (8th)		Aupee Karim ‡		Shukno Plool Rongin Phool (2005)	
2005 (8th)		Rumana Rashid Ishita		Aparoopa (2005)	
2005 (8th)		Jaya Ahsan		Enechi Shurjer Hashi (2005)	
2005 (8th)		Nusrat Imrose Tisha		Otopor Nurul Huda (2005)	
2006 (9th)		Tareen Jahan ‡		Kotha Chilo Onnorokom (2006)	
2006 (9th)		Aupee Karim		Anchol (2005)	
2006 (9th)		Jaya Ahsan		Enechi Shurjer Hashi (2005)	
2006 (9th)		Nusrat Imrose Tisha		Otopor Nurul Huda (2005)	
2007 (10th)		Tareen Jahan ‡	Maya	Maya (2007)	
2007 (10th)		Jaya Ahsan		Shonkhobash (2007)	
2007 (10th)		Tania Ahmed	Golejaan	Vober Hat (2006)	
2007 (10th)		Sumaiya Shimu		Shopnochura (2007)	
2008 (11th)		Sumaiya Shimu ‡		Shopnochura (2008)	
2008 (11th)		Tania Ahmed		Nirobini (2008)	
2008 (11th)		Nusrat Imrose Tisha		Iit Kather Khancha (2008)	
2008 (11th)		Richi Solaiman		Nishithe (2008)	
2009 (12th)		Jaya Ahsan ‡	Angurlata	Tarpor O Angurlata Nando Ke Bhalobashey (2009)	
2009 (12th)		Tareen Jahan		Tumi Amar Stri (2009)	
2009 (12th)		Nusrat Imrose Tisha		Sathe (2009)	
2009 (12th)		Richi Solaiman		Tomar Doyay Bhalo Achhi Ma (2009)	
2009 (12th)		Sumaiya Shimu		Lolita (2009)	

=== 2010s ===
Year	Photos of winners	Actress	Role(s)	Film	Ref.
2010 (13th)		Nusrat Imrose Tisha ‡		Graduate (2010)	
2010 (13th)		Afsana Ara Bindu		Lilaboti (2010)	
2010 (13th)		Tareen Jahan		Jolkona (2010)	
2010 (13th)		Jaya Ahsan		Choita Pagol (2010)	
2010 (13th)		Sumaiya Shimu	Lalita	Lalita (2010)	
2011 (14th)		Jaya Ahsan ‡		Choita Pagol (2011)	
2011 (14th)		Nusrat Imrose Tisha		Chander Nijosso Kono Aalo Nei (2011)	
2011 (14th)		Bidya Sinha Saha Mim		Olospur (2011)	
2011 (14th)		Sumaiya Shimu	Lalita	Lalita (2010)	
2012 (15th)		Nusrat Imrose Tisha ‡		Long March (2012)	
2012 (15th)		Jaya Ahsan		Amader Golpo (2012)	
2012 (15th)		Sumaiya Shimu		Radio Chocolate (2012)	
2012 (15th)		Bidya Sinha Saha Mim		Kick Off (2012)	
2013 (16th)		Nusrat Imrose Tisha ‡		Jodi Bhalo Na Lage Dio Na Mon (2013)	
2013 (16th)		Aupee Karim		Akashlina (2013)	
2013 (16th)		Sumaiya Shimu		Radio Chocolate Reloded (2013)	
2013 (16th)		Rafiath Rashid Mithila		Landphoner Dingulote Prem (2013)	
2014 (17th)		Nusrat Imrose Tisha ‡	Bijlee	Bijlee (2014)	
2014 (17th)		Bidya Sinha Saha Mim		November Rain (2014)	
2014 (17th)		Agnila Iqbal		Lal Kham Bonam Neel Kham (2014)	
2014 (17th)		Farhana Mili		Bhalobasar Dwitio Golpo (2014)	
2015 (18th)		Nusrat Imrose Tisha ‡	Tilottama	Tilottama, Tomar Jonno (2015)	
2015 (18th)		Aupee Karim		E Shohor Madhobilotar Na (2015)	
2015 (18th)		Mehazabien Chowdhury		Superstar (2015)	
2015 (18th)		Rafiath Rashid Mithila		Shukher Charpotro (2015)	
2016 (19th)		Nusrat Imrose Tisha ‡		Ekti Talgach-er Golpo (2016)	
2016 (19th)		Bidya Sinha Saha Mim		Sei Meyeti (2016)	
2016 (19th)		Mehazabien Chowdhury		Hatta Dao Na Bariye (2016)	
2016 (19th)		Rafiath Rashid Mithila		Kothopokothon (2016)	
2017 (20th)		Mehazabien Chowdhury ‡	Riya	Boro Chele (2017)	
2017 (20th)		Nusrat Imrose Tisha		Soino Pru (2017)	
2017 (20th)		Purnima		Deyaler Opare (2017)	
2017 (20th)		Rafiath Rashid Mithila		Batch 27 The Last Page (2017)	
2018 (21st)		Mehazabien Chowdhury ‡		Buker Ba Pashe (2018)	
2018 (21st)		Zakia Bari Mamo		Shesh Porjonto (2018)	
2018 (21st)		Tanjin Tisha		Ei Sohore Keu Nei (2018)	
2018 (21st)		Nusrat Imrose Tisha	Ayesha	Ayesha (2018)	

== See also ==
- Meril-Prothom Alo Critics Choice Award for Best TV Actress
- Meril-Prothom Alo Critics Award for Best Film Actress
- Meril-Prothom Alo Awards
