= Meril-Prothom Alo Critics Choice Award for Best TV Actress =

Annual Bangladeshi TV award

- Awarded for: Best Performance by a Television Actress in a Leading Role
- Country: Bangladesh
- Presented by: Meril-Prothom Alo
- First award: Meghna (1998)
- Currently held by: Rumana Rashid Ishita, Pata Jharar Din (2018)

Meril-Prothom Alo Critics Choice Award for Best TV Actress is given by Meril-Prothom Alo as part of its annual Meril-Prothom Alo Awards for Bengali-language films actress.

== Multiple winners ==
- 2 Wins: Nusrat Imrose Tisha, Aupee Karim

== Multiple nominees ==
- 5 Nominations: Nusrat Imrose Tisha
- 4 Nominations: Jaya Ahsan
- 3 Nominations: Aupee Karim
- 2 Nominations: Sanjida Preeti

== Winners and nominees ==
Table key
‡	Indicates the winner

=== 1990s ===
Year	Photos of winners	Actress	Role(s)	Film
1998 (1st)		Meghna ‡		
1999 (2nd)		Rokeya Prachy ‡		Chor (1999)
1999 (2nd)		Tania Ahmed		Dokkhiner Ghar (1999)
1999 (2nd)		Natasha Hayat		Unmesh (1999)

=== 2000s ===
Year	Photos of winners	Actress	Role(s)	Film	Ref.
2000 (3rd)		Tarana Halim ‡			
2001 (4th)		Afsana Mimi ‡	Housewife (2002)		
2002 (5th)		Richi Solaiman ‡			
2003 (6th)		Elora Gohor ‡			
2004 (7th)		Suborna Mustafa ‡			
2005 (8th)		Shomi Kaiser ‡			
2006 (9th)		Jaya Ahsan ‡		Hutkura (2006)	
2007 (10th)		Aupee Karim ‡	Nusrat	Nusrat, Sange Ekta Galpo (2007)	
2008 (11th)		Monira Mithu ‡		Emon Deshti Kothao Khujey Pabey Nako Tumi (2008)	
2008 (11th)		Nowrin Hasan Khan Jenny		Akti Phone Kora Jave Please (2008)	
2008 (11th)		Sabrin Saka Meem		Nodir Naam Nayanthara (2008)	
2009 (12th)		Nauha Munir Dihan ‡		Bikol Pakhir Gaan (2009)	
2009 (12th)		Jaya Ahsan		Typewriter (2009)	
2009 (12th)		Nawsheen Nahreen Mou		Is Equal To (2009)	

=== 2010s ===
Year	Photos of winners	Actress	Role(s)	Film	Ref.
2010 (13th)		Dipanwita Haldar ‡		Kaata (2010)	
2011 (14th)		Nusrat Imrose Tisha ‡	Tahmina	Tahminar Dinjapon (2011)	
2011 (14th)		Jaya Ahsan		Koyekti Neel Rongpencil (2011)	
2011 (14th)		Sharmin Zoha Shoshee		Necklace (2011)	
2012 (15th)		Tareen Jahan ‡		Sobuj Velvet (2012)	
2012 (15th)		Jaya Ahsan		Amader Golpo (2012)	
2012 (15th)		Laila Hasan		Noutar Sangbad (2012)	
2013 (16th)		Farzana Chobi ‡		Simana Periye (2013)	
2013 (16th)		Aupee Karim		Puraghotito Bortoman (2013)	
2013 (16th)		Nusrat Imrose Tisha		Duti Britto Pashapashi (2013)	
2014 (17th)		Sanjida Preeti ‡		Surface (2014)	
2014 (17th)		Priyanka Agnila Iqbal		Lal Kham Bonam Nil Kham (2014)	
2014 (17th)		Zakia Bari Mamo		Akshay Companir Juta (2014)	
2015 (18th)		Nusrat Imrose Tisha ‡	Shefali	Shefali (2015)	
2016 (19th)		Aupee Karim ‡	Madhobilata	Madhobilata Groho Ar Na (2016)	
2016 (19th)		Sadia Jahan Prova		Leaflet (2016)	
2016 (19th)		Sanjida Preeti		March Mashe Shooting (2017)	
2017 (20th)		Savita Sen ‡		March Mashe Shooting (2017)	
2017 (20th)		Tamalika Karmakar		Mayabari (2017)	
2017 (20th)		Nusrat Imrose Tisha		Buker Bhitor Kichu Parthor Thaka Bhalo (2017)	
2018 (21st)		Rumana Rashid Ishita ‡		Pata Jhorar Din (2018)	
2018 (21st)		Nusrat Imrose Tisha	Ayesha	Ayesha (2018)	
2018 (21st)		Prosun Azad	Pori	Purano Premer Gappo (2018)	

== See also ==
- Meril-Prothom Alo Award for Best TV Actress
- Meril-Prothom Alo Critics Choice Award for Best Film Actress
- Meril-Prothom Alo Awards
