= Meril-Prothom Alo Award for Best Film Actress =

Annual Bangladeshi film award

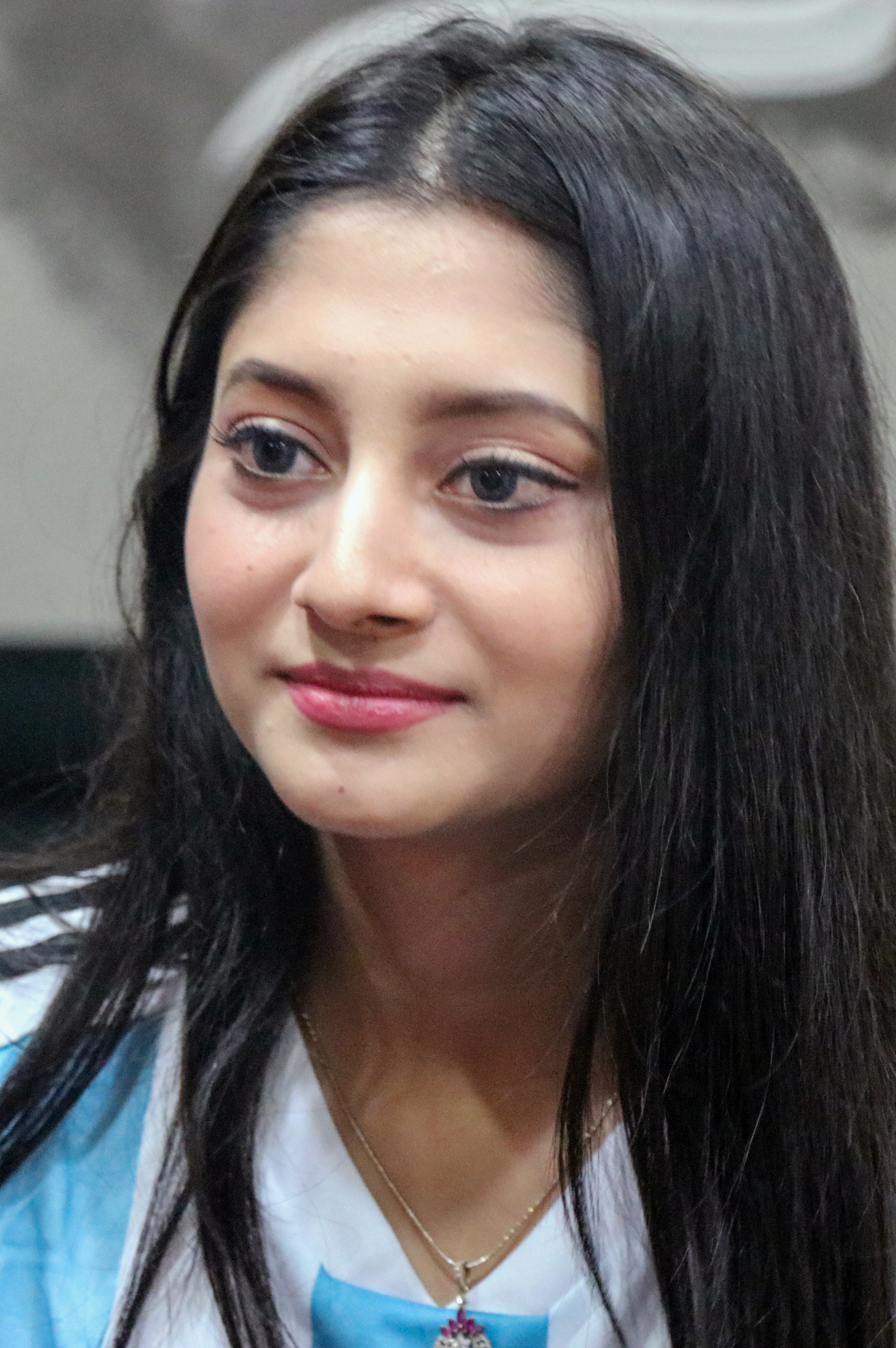
- The 2019 recipient: Puja Cherry Roy
- Awarded for: Best Performance by an Actress in a Leading Role
- Country: Bangladesh
- Presented by: Meril-Prothom Alo
- First award: Shabnur (1998)
- Currently held by: Puja Cherry Roy, PoraMon 2 (2018)

Highlights
- Most awards: Shabnur (10)
- Most nominations: Shabnur (13)

Meril-Prothom Alo Award for Best Film Actress is given by Meril-Prothom Alo as part of its annual Meril-Prothom Alo Awards for Bengali films, to recognise the female actor who has delivered an outstanding performance in a leading role. The award was first given in 1999.

== Multiple winners ==
- 10 Wins: Shabnur
- 2 Wins: Moushumi, Purnima, Jaya Ahsan

== Multiple nominees ==
- 13 Nominations: Shabnur
- 10 Nominations: Moushumi, Apu Biswas
- 9 Nominations: Purnima
- 6 Nominations: Jaya Ahsan
- 4 Nominations: Mahiya Mahi, Nusrat Imrose Tisha
- 3 Nominations: Bidya Sinha Saha Mim
- 2 Nominations: Pori Moni, Zakia Bari Mamo

== Winners and nominees ==
Table key
‡	Indicates the winner

=== 1990s ===
Year	Photos of winners	Actress	Role(s)	Film	Ref.
1998 (1st)		Shabnur ‡	N/a	N/a	
1999 (2nd)		Shabnur ‡	N/a	N/a	
1999 (2nd)		Sadika Parvin Popy	—N/a	—N/a	
1999 (2nd)		Moushumi	—N/a	—N/a	

=== 2000s ===
Year	Photos of winners	Actress	Role(s)	Film	Ref.
2000 (3rd)		Shabnur ‡	N/a	N/a	
2001 (4th)		Shabnur ‡	Prema Chodhury	Shoshurbari Zindabad (2001)	
2001 (4th)		Purnima		Shikari (2001)	
2001 (4th)		Moushumi	Meghla	Veja Biral (2001)	
2002 (5th)		Shabnur ‡		Shami Strir Juddho (2002)	
2002 (5th)		Purnima		Shami Strir Juddho (2002)	
2002 (5th)		Moushumi	Meghla	Meghla Akash (2002)	
2002 (5th)		Shimla		Boma Hamla (2002)	
2003 (6th)		Purnima ‡	Renu (Anu)	Moner Majhe Tumi	
2003 (6th)		Moushumi	Nodi	Kokhono Megh Kokhono Brishti	
2003 (6th)		Shabnur	Barsha	Bou Shashurir Juddho	
2004 (7th)		Shabnur ‡	Parul	Fuler Moto Bou (2004)	
2004 (7th)		Aupee Karim	Sathi	Bachelor (2004)	
2004 (7th)		Bipasha Hayat	Hawa	Joyjatra (2004)	
2005 (8th)		Shabnur ‡	Parul	Molla Barir Bou (2005)	
2005 (8th)		Shrabanti	Athoi	Wrong Number (2004)	
2005 (8th)		Purnima	Mouli Chowdhury	Taka (2004)	
2005 (8th)		Moushumi	Bokul	Molla Barir Bou (2005)	
2006 (9th)		Purnima ‡	Adhora	Hridoyer Kotha (2006)	
2006 (9th)		Apu Biswas		Caccu (2006)	
2006 (9th)		Moushumi		Mayer Morjada (2006)	
2006 (9th)		Shabnur	Tithi	Forever Flows (2006)	
2007 (10th)		Shabnur ‡		Amar Praner Swami (2007)	
2007 (10th)		Apu Biswas		Machineman (2007)	
2007 (10th)		Zakia Bari Mamo	Jori	Daruchini Dip (2007)	
2007 (10th)		Purnima	Chhoa	Moner Sathe Juddho (2007)	
2008 (11th)		Shabnur ‡	Kajol	Ek Takar Bou	
2008 (11th)		Apu Biswas		Ek Buk Valobasha	
2008 (11th)		Purnima	Chhoa	Akash Chhoa Bhalobasa	
2008 (11th)		Meher Afroz Shaon	Nishad	Amar Ache Jol	
2009 (12th)		Shabnur ‡		Bolbo Kotha Bashor Ghore (2009)	
2009 (12th)		Apu Biswas		Mone Boro Kosto (2009)	
2009 (12th)		Nusrat Imrose Tisha	Ruba Haque	Third Person Singular Number (2009)	
2009 (12th)		Farhana Mili	Pori	Monpura (2008)	
2009 (12th)		Bidya Sinha Saha Mim	Priyanka	Amar Praner Priya (2008)	

=== 2010s ===
Year	Photos of winners	Actress	Role(s)	Film	Ref.
2010 (13th)		Moushumi ‡	Golapi	Golapi Ekhon Bilatey (2010)	
2010 (13th)		Apu Biswas	Aleya Alo	Bhalobaslei Ghor Bandha Jay Na (2010)	
2010 (13th)		Anika Kabir Shokh		Bolo Na Tumi Amar (2010)	
2010 (13th)		Purnima	Bilkish Banu	Poran Jai Jolia Re (2010)	
2010 (13th)		Shabnur	Bilkish Banu	Evabey Bhalobasha Hoy (2010)	
2011 (14th)		Moushumi ‡	Rita	Projapoti (2011)	
2011 (14th)		Apu Biswas	Munia	King Khan (2011)	
2011 (14th)		Jaya Ahsan	Bilkish Banu	Guerrilla (2011)	
2011 (14th)		Purnima	Bilkish Banu	Mayer Jonno Pagol (2011)	
2012 (15th)		Kusum Sikder ‡	Nidhi	Lal Tip (2012)	
2012 (15th)		Jaya Ahsan ‡	Noboni Afroz	Chorabali (2012)	
2012 (15th)		Apu Biswas		Ak Takar Denmohor (2012)	
2012 (15th)		Afiea Nusrat Barsha	Adhora	Most Welcome (2012)	
2013 (16th)		Jaya Ahsan ‡	Zara Haque	Purno Doirgho Prem Kahini (2013)	
2013 (16th)		Nusrat Imrose Tisha	Kohinoor	Television (2012)	
2013 (16th)		Mahiya Mahi	Misti	Onnorokom Bhalobasha (2012)	
2013 (16th)		Moushumi	Chandramukhi	Devdas (2013)	
2014 (17th)		Mahiya Mahi ‡	Tanisha	Agnee (2014)	
2014 (17th)		Apu Biswas	Priya	Daring Lover (2014)	
2014 (17th)		Bidya Sinha Saha Mim	Chad	Taarkata (2014)	
2014 (17th)		Moushumi	Deepa	Ek Cup Cha (2014)	
2015 (18th)		Zakia Bari Mamo ‡	Nila Khan	Chuye Dile Mon (2015)	
2015 (18th)		Apu Biswas	Monica	Love Marriage (2015)	
2015 (18th)		Bidya Sinha Saha Mim	Phooleswari / Rupak	Podmo Patar Jol (2015)	
2015 (18th)		Mahiya Mahi	Juliet	Romeo vs Juliet (2015)	
2016 (19th)		Masuma Rahman Nabila ‡	Hridi	Aynabaji (2016)	
2016 (19th)		Jaya Ahsan	Mitu	Purno Doirgho Prem Kahini 2 (2016)	
2016 (19th)		Nusrat Imrose Tisha	Pori	Ostitto (2016)	
2016 (19th)		Pori Moni	Pori / Saniya	Rokto (2016)	
2017 (20th)		Nusrat Imrose Tisha ‡	Saberi	No Bed of Roses (2017)	
2017 (20th)		Apu Biswas	Arshha	Rajneeti (2017)	
2017 (20th)		Jaya Ahsan	Sarojini	The Cage (2017)	
2017 (20th)		Mahiya Mahi	Chaiti	Dhaka Attack (2017)	
2018 (21st)		Puja Cherry Roy ‡	Pori	PoraMon 2	
2018 (21st)		Jaya Ahsan	Ranu	Debi	
2018 (21st)		Pori Moni	Shuvra	Swapnajaal	
2018 (21st)		Sabnam Faria	Nilu	Debi	

== See also ==
- Meril-Prothom Alo Critics Award for Best Film Actress
- Meril-Prothom Alo Awards
