= Meril-Prothom Alo Critics Choice Award for Best Film Actress =

Annual Bangladeshi film award

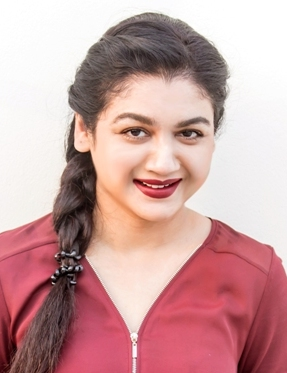
- The 2019 recipient: Jaya Ahsan
- Awarded for: Best Performance by an Actress in a Leading Role
- Country: Bangladesh
- Presented by: Meril-Prothom Alo Awards
- First award: Meher Afroz Shaon, Chandrokotha (2004)
- Currently held by: Jaya Ahsan, Debi (2019)

Meril-Prothom Alo Critics Choice Award for Best Film Actress is given by Meril-Prothom Alo as part of its annual Meril-Prothom Alo Awards for Bengali-language films actress.

== Superlatives ==
Superlative	Actor	Record
Actress with most awards	Jaya Ahsan	2
Actress with most nominations	Purnima	2

== Multiple winners ==
- 2 Wins: Jaya Ahsan

== Multiple nominees ==
- 2 Nominations: Purnima

== Winners and nominees ==
Table key
‡	Indicates the winner

=== 2000s ===
Year	Photos of winners	Actress	Role(s)	Film	Ref.
2003 (6th)		Meher Afroz Shaon ‡	Chandra	Chandrokotha (2003)	
2004 (7th)		Aupee Karim ‡	Sathi	Bachelor (2004)	
2005 (8th)		Sharmin Joha Shoshi ‡	Tuni	Hajar Bachhor Dhore (2005)	
2006 (9th)		Sohana Saba ‡	Ayna	Ayna (2006)	
2007 (10th)		Purnima ‡		Dhoka (2007)	
2008 (11th)		Bidya Sinha Saha Mim ‡	Dilu/Dilshad	Amar Ache Jol (2008)	
2008 (11th)		Purnima	Chhoa	Akash Chhoa Bhalobasa (2008)	
2008 (11th)		Munmun Ahmed	Rehana	Amar Ache Jol (2008)	
2009 (12th)		Nusrat Imrose Tisha ‡	Ruba Haque	Third Person Singular Number (2009)	
2009 (12th)		Farhana Mili	Rupa	Gangajatra (2009)	
2009 (12th)		Shimla	Pori	Monpura (2009)	

=== 2010s ===
Year	Photos of winners	Actress	Role(s)	Film	Ref.
2010 (13th)		Mirana Jaman ‡	Grandma	Opekkha (2010)	
2010 (13th)		Rabeya Akter Moni	Rahima	Runway (2010)	
2011 (14th)		Jaya Ahsan ‡	Bilkish Banu	Guerrilla (2011)	
2011 (14th)		Nipun Akter		Adorer Jamai (2011)	
2011 (14th)		Moushumi	Rita	Projapoti (2011)	
2012 (15th)		Shamima Nazneen ‡	Mayna	Ghetuputra Komola (2012)	
2012 (15th)		Jannatul Ferdoush Peya	Suzana	Chorabali (2012)	
2012 (15th)		Meghla	Ayesha	Uttarer Sur (2012)	
2013 (16th)		Naznin Hasan Chumki ‡	Fuljaan	Ekee Britte (2013)	
2014 (17th)		Moushumi ‡	Deepa	Ek Cup Cha (2014)	
2014 (17th)		Mahiya Mahi	Tanisha	Agnee (2014)	
2014 (17th)		Sohana Saba	Durga Rani	Brihonnola (2014)	
2015 (18th)		Zakia Bari Mamo ‡	Nila Khan	Chuye Dile Mon (2015)	
2016 (19th)		Sajhbati ‡	Rupsha	Shankhachil (2016)	
2016 (19th)		Kusum Sikder	Laila	Shankhachil (2016)	
2016 (19th)		Masuma Rahman Nabila	Hridi	Aynabaji (2016)	
2017 (20th)		Runa Khan ‡	Maimuna	Chhitkini (2017)	
2018 (21st)		Jaya Ahsan ‡	Ranu	Debi (2018)	
2018 (21st)		Pori Moni	Shuvra	Swapnajaal (2018)	
2018 (21st)		Puja Cherry Roy	Pori	PoraMon 2 (2018)	

== See also ==
- Meril-Prothom Alo Awards for Best Film Actress
- Meril-Prothom Alo Critics Choice Award for Best TV Actress
- Meril-Prothom Alo Awards
