= Meril-Prothom Alo Critics Choice Award for Best Film Director =

Annual Bangladeshi film award

- Awarded for: Critics Award for Best Film Director
- Country: Bangladesh
- Presented by: Meril-Prothom Alo
- First award: 2003 (for direction in films released during the 2002 film season)
- Most recent winner: Giasuddin Selim; Swapnajaal (2019)

Meril-Prothom Alo Critics Choice Award for Best Film Director is an award presented annually by Meril-Prothom Alo as part of its Meril-Prothom Alo Awards.

== Multiple wins and nominations ==
The following individuals have won multiple Best Film Director awards:

Wins	Director
2
2	Mostofa Sarwar Farooki
2	Tauquir Ahmed

The following directors have received multiple Best Film Director nominations (* indicates no wins):

Nominations	Director
4	Tauquir Ahmed
3	Mostofa Sarwar Farooki
2	Humayun Ahmed
2	Morshedul Islam
2	Giasuddin Selim

== Winners and nominees ==
Table key
indicates the winner	‡ Indicates the winner of Best Film

=== 2000s ===
Year	Director(s)	Film	Ref.
2000s
2002 (5th)	Nurul Alam Atique	Choturtha Matra	
2003 (6th)	Saidul Anam Tutul	Adhiar ‡	
2004 (7th)	Tauquir Ahmed	Joyjatra	
2005 (8th)	Shuchanda	Hajar Bachhor Dhore ‡	
2006 (9th)	Tauquir Ahmed	Rupkothar Golpo	
2007 (10th)	Shahin Shomon	Dhoka	
2007 (10th)	Enamul Karim Nirjhar	Aha!	
2007 (10th)	Golam Rabbany Biplob	Swopnodanay ‡	
2008 (11th)	Murad Parvez	Chandragrohon ‡	
2008 (11th)	SA Haque Alik	Akash Chhoa Bhalobasa	
2008 (11th)	Humayun Ahmed	Amar Ache Jol	
2009 (12th)	Mostofa Sarwar Farooki	Third Person Singular Number ‡	
2009 (12th)	Giasuddin Selim	Monpura	
2009 (12th)	Syed Wahiduzzaman Diamond	Gangajatra	

=== 2010s ===
Year	Director(s)	Film	Ref.
2010s
2010 (13th)	Abu Sayeed	Opekkha	
2010 (13th)	Khalid Mahmood Mithu	Gohine Shobdo	
2010 (13th)	Tareque Masud	Runway ‡	
2011 (14th)	Nasiruddin Yousuff	Guerrilla ‡	
2011 (14th)	Morshedul Islam	Amar Bondhu Rashed	
2011 (14th)	Shah Alam Kiron	Matir Thikana	
2012 (15th)	Humayun Ahmed	Ghetuputra Komola	
2012 (15th)	Masud Akhand	Pita	
2012 (15th)	Redoan Rony	Chorabali	
2013 (16th)	Mohammad Hannan	Shikhandi Kotha	
2013 (16th)	Kazi Hayat	Eve Teasing	
2013 (16th)	Gazi Rakayet	Mrittika Maya	
2014 (17th)	Mostofa Sarwar Farooki	Ant Story	
2014 (17th)	Murad Parvez	Brihonnola ‡	
2014 (17th)	Mohammad Mostafa Kamal Raz	Taarkata	
2015 (18th)	Morshedul Islam	Anil Bagchir Ekdin	
2015 (18th)	Animesh Aich	Zero Degree	
2015 (18th)	Shihab Shaheen	Chuye Dile Mon ‡	
2016 (19th)	Amitabh Reza Chowdhury	Aynabaji	
2016 (19th)	Tauquir Ahmed	Oggatonama ‡	
2016 (19th)	Sumon Dhar	Darpan Bishorjon	
2017 (20th)	Akram Khan	The Cage ‡	
2017 (20th)	Tauquir Ahmed	Haldaa	
2017 (20th)	Mostofa Sarwar Farooki	No Bed of Roses	
2018 (21st)	Giasuddin Selim	Swapnajaal	
2018 (21st)	Anam Biswas	Debi	
2018 (21st)	Noor Imran Mithu	Komola Rocket ‡	

== See also ==
- Meril-Prothom Alo Awards
