= Meril-Prothom Alo Critics Choice Award for Best Playwright =

Film recognition of excellence

- Country: Bangladesh
- Presented by: Meril-Prothom Alo
- First award: 1998
- Most recent winner: Redoan Rony; Pata Jhorar Din (2018)

The Meril-Prothom Alo Critics Choice Award for Best Playwright began in 1998 in Bangladesh recognizing people in the film industry.

== Winners and nominees ==
Winners are listed first in the coloured row, followed by the other nominees.

- Tariq Anam Khan (1998)
- Abul Hayat (1999)
- Masum Reza (2000)
- Ratan Paul (2001)
- Nurul Alam Atique (2002)
- Giasuddin Selim (2003)
- Giasuddin Selim (2004)
- Muhammed Zafar Iqbal (2005) (Ekti Shundor Shokal)
- Masum Reza (2006) (Modhu Moyra)
- Litu Shakhawat (2007) (Fera)
- Nurul Alam Atique & Ranjan Rabbani (2008) (Ekti Phone Kora Jabe Please?)
- Nurul Alam Atique (2009) (Bikol Pakhir Gaan)
- Iftekhar Ahmed Fahmi (2010) (Seluloed Man)
- Monoar Kabir (2011)
- Azad Abul Kalam (2012) (Sobuj Velvet)
- Partho Shahriar (2013) (Jong Kutumbpur)
- Monirul Islam Rubel (2014) (Protidin Shonibar)
- Ashraful Chanchal (2015) (Shonibar Raat Doshta Chollish Minute)
- Sarower Reza Jimi (2016) (Jog Biyog)
- Ashfaque Nipun (2017)

=== 2010s ===
Year	Title	Nominees
2018 (21st)	Pata Jhorar Din	Redoan Rony‡
2018 (21st)	Purano Premer Golpo	Golam Sohrab Dodul
2018 (21st)	Modern Times	Nazmul Nobin
