= Choturtha Matra =

2001 television film by Nurul Alam Atique

- Bengali: চতুর্থ মাত্রা
- Based on: Choturtha Matra by Shahidul Jahir
- Screenplay by: Nurul Alam Atique
- Directed by: Nurul Alam Atique
- Starring: Jayanta Chattopadhyay; Tamalika Karmakar; M.M. Morshed; Sonia Zafar; Shamsul Alom Bakul; Fazlur Rahman Babu
- Country of origin: Bangladesh
- Original language: Bengali

Production
- Producer: Ashraful Azim
- Cinematography: Kamrul Hasan Khoshru
- Editors: Sameer Ahmed; E. Kabir Joel
- Running time: 87 mins

Original release
- Release: 2001

Choturtha Matra is a 2001 Bangladeshi television drama film written and directed by Nurul Alam Atique. The film is based on a story by the same name written by Shahidul Jahir. It stars Jayanta Chattopadhyay, Tamalika Karmakar, Sonia Zafar, M.M. Morshed, Shamsul Alom Bakul and Fazlur Rahman Babu.

The film won Meril Prothom Alo Critics Choice Awards in 2002 in three categories.

== Plot ==
The story is of a lonely man who was caught in a perpetual cycle of time. He hangs in limbo, between reality and dreams. His only companions are a maid, a cat, and a grandfather clock. The same things are happening in his life and he becomes increasingly frustrated.

== Cast ==
- Jayanta Chattopadhyay as Abdul Karim
- Tamalika Karmakar as maid servant
- M.M. Morshed as the paper seller
- Sonia Zafar as the woman
- Shamsul Alam Bakul as landowner
- Junaid Halim as candy seller
- Munir as children I
- Shobuj as children II
- Arif as children II
- Rajeeb as children II
- Fazlur Rahman Babu as neighbour I
- Ashoke Bepari as neighbour II
- Bablu Biswas as neighbour III
- Dardesh Chacha as hores rider

== Awards ==
Awards
Ceremony	Year	Category	Recipients and nominee	Result	Ref.
Meril Prothom Alo Awards	2002	Critics Award for Best Film Actor	Jayanta Chattopadhyay	Won	
Meril Prothom Alo Awards	2002	Critics Award for Best Film Director	Nurul Alam Atique	Won	
Meril Prothom Alo Awards	2002	Critics Award for Best Playwright	Nurul Alam Atique	Won	
