= Nusrat Imrose Tisha =

Bangladeshi actress, model and producer

- নুসরাত ইমরোজ তিশা
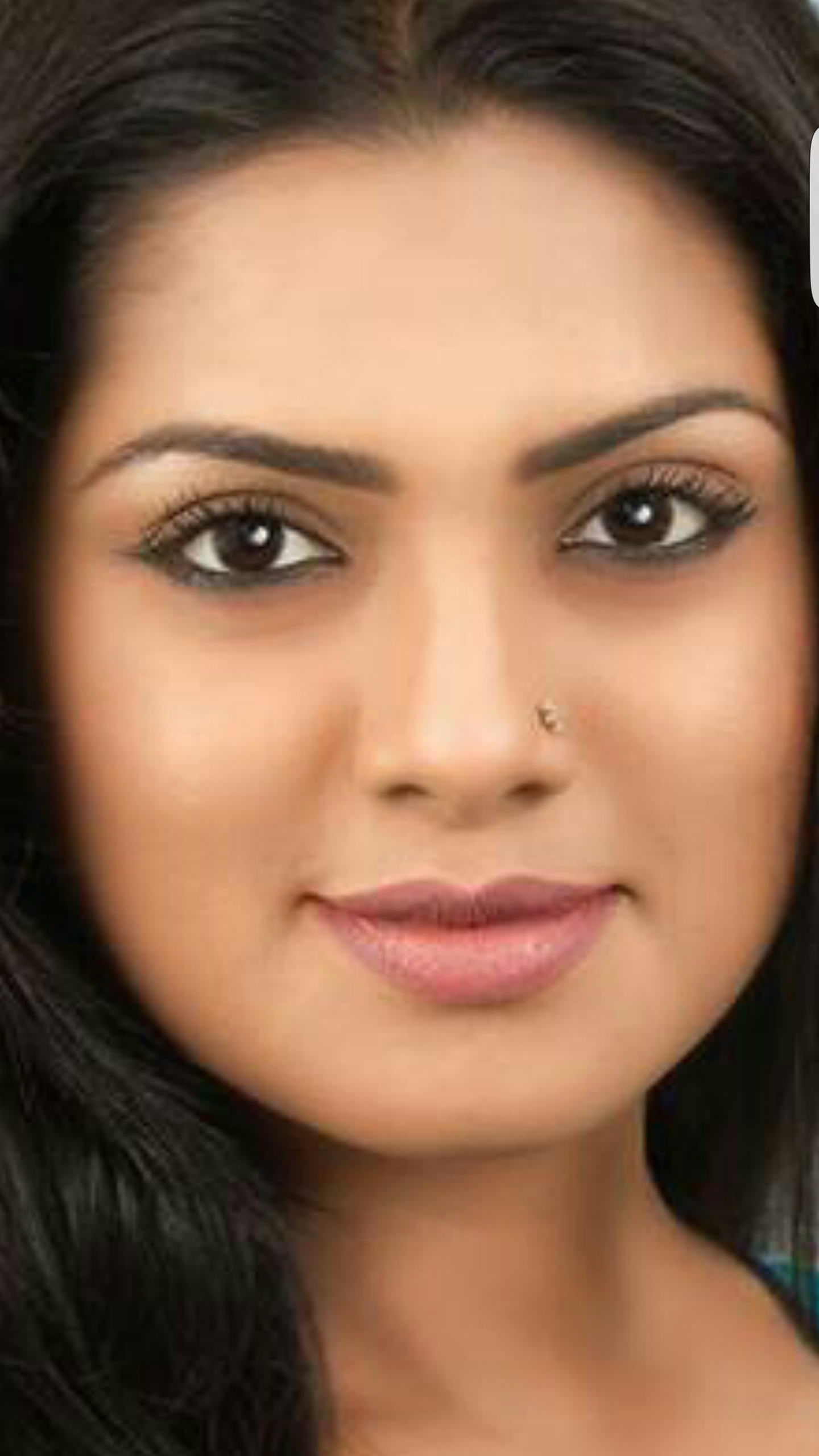
- Tisha
- Born: 20 February 1982 (age 44); Rajshahi, Bangladesh
- Other name: Tisha
- Education: North South University
- Occupations: Actress; model; producer
- Years active: 1998–present
- Spouse: Mostofa Sarwar Farooki (m. 2010)
- Children: 1
- Awards: See below

Nusrat Imrose Tisha, (Bengali: নুসরাত ইমরোজ তিশা, romanized: Nusrat Imroj Tisha; born 20 February 1982) known mononymously as Tisha, is a Bangladeshi actress, model and producer who has appeared mainly in Bengali television and films. She has garnered popularity with her performances both on television and the silver screen.

Born in Rajshahi, Bangladesh, Tisha has raised through the Bangladeshi reality television competition Notun Kuri in 1993. Her first screen appearance was in the Bengali television drama Shat Prohorer Kabbo in 1998. As of 2020, she has appeared in more than a hundred television drama. She made her film debut in playing a role named Ru ba Haque in the Bengali drama Third Person Singular Number in 2009. For the role she was nominated for Meril-Prothom Alo Award for Best Film Actress and won Critics Choice Award for Best Film Actress. The film was the Bangladeshi submissions for the 83rd Academy Awards for Best International Feature Film.

She went on to establish herself with starring roles in several films directed by Mostofa Sarwar Farooki, including Television (2012), Doob: No Bed of Roses (2017). As of 2020, her accolades include two National Film Award. Tisha made her debut as a producer in the upcoming American-Indian-Bangladeshi drama No Land's Man, starring Nawazuddin Siddiqui and directed by Mostofa Sarwar Farooki.

== Early life ==
Tisha was born on 20 February 1982 in Rajshahi. Her mother Shaheen Mahfuja Hoque and her father Enamul Hoque. Tisha started learning music at the age of five. In 1993, she took second place in Bangladesh Television's Notun Kuri talent hunt program. In the same contest two years later, she won the gold cup award. She has attended North South University, in Dhaka.

== Personal life ==
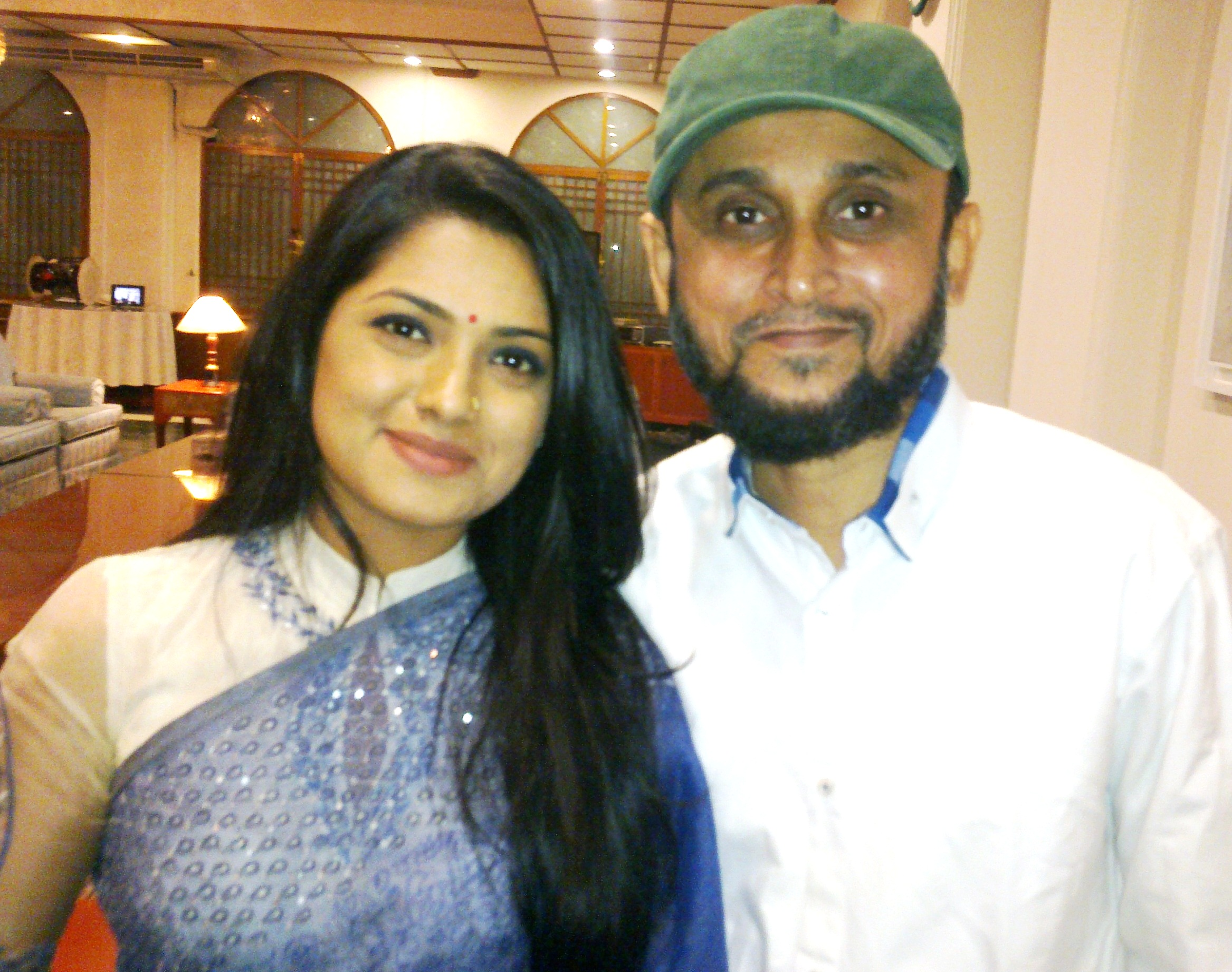
Tisha and Farooki in 2015

Tisha married filmmaker Mostofa Sarwar Farooki on 16 July 2010 after years of dating. Together they have a daughter who has been named as Ilham Nusrat Farooki, born on 5 January 2022.

== Career ==
=== Television ===
Tisha started her acting career in 1998 through the television drama Shat Prohorer Kabbo directed by Ahsan Habib and written by Anonto Heera. She also formed a band named Angel Four. In 2005 she was nominated for the Meril-Prothom Alo Award for Best TV Actress for drama Otopor Nurul Nuda directed by Arannya Anwar. And following in 2008 for drama Iit Kather Khancha written and directed by Shihab Khan and in 2009 for Sathe. Tisha won her first Meril-Prothom Alo Award for Best TV Actress for her role in television serial Graduate. In 2011 she was nominated in the same category for the Chander Nijosso Kono Aalo Nei. In the same year, she won her first Meril-Prothom Alo Critics Choice Award for Best TV Actress for the role Tahmina in the television drama Tahminar Dinjapon. In 2012 she won her second Meril-Prothom Alo Award for Best TV Actress awards for Long March and following in 2013 for the drama Jodi Bhalo Na Lage Dio Na Mon. In 2013 she also nominated in the Meril-Prothom Alo Award Critics Choice Award for Best TV Actress category for Duti Britto Pashapashi. In 2014 she won her 5th Meril-Prothom Alo Best TV Actress award for Bijli and in 2015 for drama Tilottama, Tomar Jonno. In 2015 she won her second Meril-Prothom Alo Award Critics Choice Award for Best TV Actress for Shefali. In 2016 Tisha won her 6th Best TV Actress award in Meril-Prothom Alo for the drama Ekti Talgach-er Golpo. Since she is a solo recorded winner for this category.

In 2020, a Durga Puja special drama titled Bijoya written by Salah Uddin Shoaib Choudhury and director Abu Hayat Mahmud Bhuiya, starring Tisha is coming under controversies for hurting religious sentiments. It was stated that allegedly depicting Hindu women as morally questionable and Hindu men as "alcoholic, barbaric and powerless".

=== Modeling ===
Tisha first modeled for Meril Lipjel. She has participated in advertisements for Coca-Cola, City cell, Parachute, Bombay Sweets and Keya Cosmetics. She won the Meril Prothom Alo Awards for modeling in 2003 and 2004. After a six-year break, Tisha returned to TV advertising in 2014 by appearing in an ad for Square. She also appeared in ads for Robi, Rupchanda, Dabur Amla etc.

=== Films ===
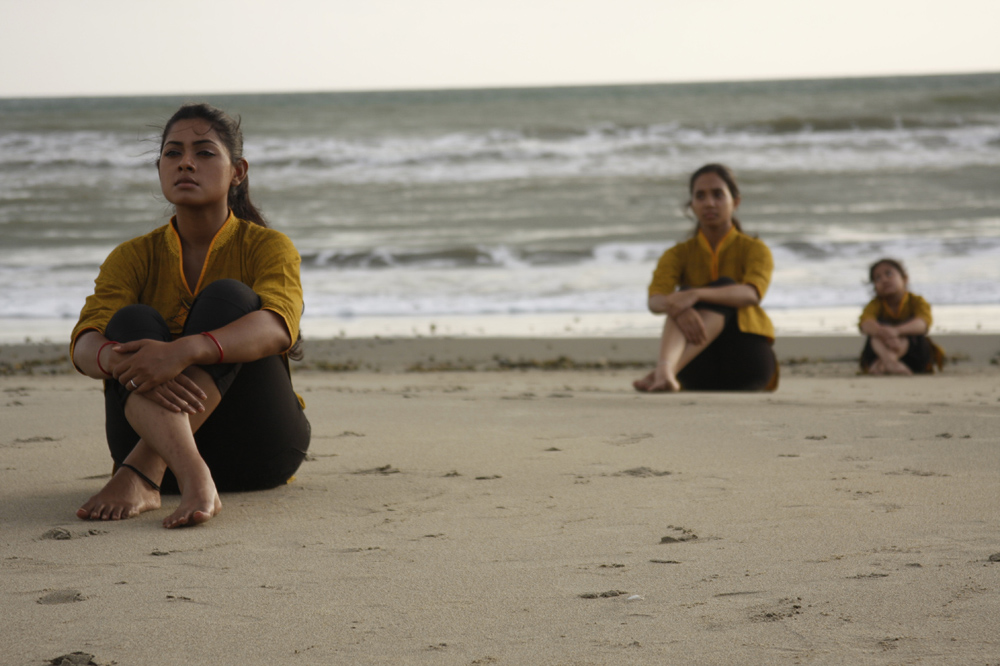
Tisha in the film Third Person Singular Number (2010)

==== 2009-2010: Breakthrough ====
On the silver screen, Tisha first appeared in Mostofa Sarwar Farooki's critically acclaimed Third Person Singular Number in 2009 starring alongside Mosharraf Karim, Topu, Abul Hayat and others. Jay Weissberg of Variety stated that, "Ruba's revulsion, yet lack of surprise, is beautifully calibrated by Tisha". For her role Ruba Haque, she was nominated for the Best Film Actress and won the Critics Choice Award for Best Film Actress in the 12th Meril-Prothom Alo Awards. The film was the Bangladeshi submissions for the 83rd Academy Awards for Best International Feature Film. Following year, she made a special appearance as Selina in the film Runway directed by Tareque Masud.

==== 2012–2016: Television and other success ====
Tisha in the film Television

Following the success of Third Person Singular Number, in 2012 she starred in Television alongside Chanchal Chowdhury and Mosharraf Karim and directed by Farooki. For her role Kohinur, she was nominated for the Meril-Prothom Alo Award for Best Film Actress. The film also was the Bangladeshi submissions for the 86th Academy Awards for Best International Feature Film.

In 2016, she did her first commercial movie Rana Pagla: The Mental opposite superstar Shakib Khan directed by Shamim Ahmed Roni. Later in the year, she appeared in Ostitto directed by Anonno Mamun starring opposite Arifin Shuvo. For her outstanding performance in this film, she was honoured with the Bangladesh National Film Award for Best Actress in 2016 and nominated for the Meril-Prothom Alo Award for Best Film Actress.

==== 2017-present ====
In 2017, she was seen in Doob, a Bangladesh-India co-production directed by Mostofa Sarwar Farooki starring alongside Irrfan Khan, Parno Mittra and Rokeya Prachy. She received the prestigious Meril-Prothom Alo Award for Best Film Actress for her performance. The film was the Bangladeshi submissions for the 91st Academy Awards for Best International Feature Film. Later she was seen in Haldaa directed by Tauquir Ahmed starring along with Mosharraf Karim, Zahid Hasan and others. She received her second Bangladesh National Film Award for Best Actress for her role in this film along with Bachsas Award for Best Actress category. In 2018, she starred in the first anthology film of Bangladesh Iti, Tomari Dhaka.

Her first release of 2019 was Fagun Haway based on the historic Language movement of 1952 directed by Tauquir Ahmed starring Siam Ahmed, Abul Hayat, Yashpal Sharma and others. The film was the Bangladeshi submissions for the 92nd Academy Awards for Best International Feature Film. In the same year, she starred as Toru for short The Old Man and The Girl by Afzal Hossain Munna. Tisha is seen in the much anticipated Bangladesh-Germany-Russia co-production Shonibar Bikel directed by Farooki starring along with a multicultural cast including Zahid Hasan, Mamunur Rashid, Parambrata Chatterjee, Eyad Hourani. It is a one-shot thriller inspired by the Holey Artisan Bakery attack in 2016. In this year she also starred in Mayaboti alongside Yash Rohan directed by Arun Chowdhury and featuring in Bonhi a short by Afsana Mimi. She also appeared in Holudboni, a Bangladesh-India co-production alongside Parambrata Chatterjee and Paoli Dam directed by Mukul Roy Chowdhury and Taher Shipon.

Tisha will soon debut as a co-producer in No Land's Man starring Nawazuddin Siddiqui and directed by Mostofa Sarwar Farooki. She also co-producer upcoming film A Burning Question directed by Farooki. As of 2020, she played the role of Sheikh Fazilatunnesa Mujib in the upcoming film Bangabandhu, based on the life of Sheikh Mujibur Rahman, directed by Shyam Benegal.

== Other work and media image ==
Tisha was appointed by the South Korean Ministry of Foreign Affairs as a 'goodwill ambassador' for two years for its Dhaka mission as part of the celebration of 40th anniversary of the two countries bilateral relations in 2013.

== Filmography ==
Key
†	Denotes films that have not yet been released

Year	Title	Role	Notes
2009	Third Person Singular Number	Ruba Haque	Won — Meril-Prothom Alo Critics Choice Award for Best Film Actress; Nominated — Meril-Prothom Alo Award for Best Film Actress; Bangladeshi submissions for the 83rd Academy Awards for Best International Feature Film
2010	Runway	Selina	Guest appearance
2012	Television	Kohinoor	Nominated — Meril-Prothom Alo Award for Best Film Actress; Bangladeshi submissions for the 86th Academy Awards for Best International Feature Film
2016	Mental	Simi	
2016	Ostitto	Pori	Won — Bangladesh National Film Award for Best Actress; Nominated — Meril-Prothom Alo Award for Best Film Actress
2017	Doob	Saberi	Won — Meril-Prothom Alo Award for Best Film Actress; Bangladeshi submissions for the 91st Academy Awards for Best International Feature Film
2017	Haldaa	Hasu	Won — Bangladesh National Film Award for Best Actress; Won — Bachsas Award for Best Actress
2018	Iti, Tomari Dhaka	Juthi	First Bangladeshi anthology film consisting of 11 vignettes by 11 Bangladeshi filmmakers
2019	Fagun Haway	Deepti	First Bangladeshi film based on the 1952 Bengali language movement
2019	The Old Man and The girl	Toru	Short by Afzal Hossain Munna
2019	Shonibar Bikel	N/A	Inspired by the terror attack incident of 1 July 2016 at Holey Artisan Bakery, Gulshan.
2019	Mayaboti	Maya "Mayaboti" Begum	
2019	Bonhi	Bonhi	Short by Afsana Mimi
2019	Holudboni	Anu	
2020	Trap		
2020	Shohor Chere Poranpur	Tushi	Webfilm
2021	No Land's Man		Premiere at BIFF in October
2023	Birkonna Pritilata	Pritilata Waddedar	
2023	Mujib: The Making of a Nation	Sheikh Fazilatunnesa Mujib "Renu"	
2023	Something Like an Autobiography	Tithi	
TBA	Dhaka 2040†	Shapla	Filming
TBA	Boba Rohossho†	Mitali Mukherjee	Filming
TBA	Balighawr†		Pre-production

=== Television ===
Year	Title	Role	Director	Network	Notes
1998	Shat Prohorer Kabbo		Ahsan Habib		
1998	Fire Dekha		Badrul Anam Saud		
1998	Greeho Golpo				
1998	Shopnojatra				
2000	Package Songbad	Fuli	Shamima Nazneen		TV movie
2004	Keboli Rat Hoye Jay		Mahfuz Ahmed		
2004	Sixty Nine	Diti	Mostofa Sarwar Farooki		
2004	Ekoda Nurul Huda				
2004	Nikhoj Songbad				
2004	Shanto Kutir		Golam Sohrab Dodul		
2004	Sultana Bibiana		Mostofa Sarwar Farooki		
2004	Waiting Room		Mostofa Sarwar Farooki		OCLC 873365488
2004	Road to America				
2004	Prem O Protisodher Golpo				
2004	Terakota				
2004	Khosru+Moyna		Kochi Khandokar		
2004	Shishir Kona		Abu Hayat Mahmud	NTV	
2004	Bujhabujhir Vul				
2005	Otopor Nurul Huda		Aranyo Anwar		
2007-2008	420	Nishi	Mostofa Sarwar Farooki	Channel i	Mini-series. Re-released in October 2020
2008-2009	Iit Kather Khancha		Shihab Khan		Serial. Nom: Meril-Prothom Alo Award for Best TV Actress
2009	Sathe				Nom: Meril-Prothom Alo Award for Best TV Actress
2010	Tiebreaker		Tarik Muhammad Hasan		Single-episode drama
2010	Brazentina		Noman Robin		
2010	Eid-er Ticket		Shokal Ahmed		
2010	Graduate		Mohammad Mostafa Kamal Raz	NTV	Nom: Meril-Prothom Alo Award for Best TV Actress
2010	Mukim Brothers		Ashfaque Nipun		
	Mobile Court		Masud Sezan		
2011	Valobashi Tai Valobeshe Jai		Shihab Shaheen		TV movie. OCLC 813204910
2011	Bahattor Ghonta	Shumona	Maksud Hossain		Telefilm
2011	Chander Nijer Kono Alo Nei		Mohammad Mostafa Kamal Raz		Nom: Meril-Prothom Alo Award for Best TV Actress
2011	Flashback	Sania	Mabrur Rashid Bannah		
2011	Tahminar Dinjapon	Tahmina			Won: Meril-Prothom Alo Critics Choice Award for Best TV Actress
2012	Projotne Bhalobasha		Kaushik Shankar Das		
2012	Long March		Masud Sezan		Won: Meril-Prothom Alo Award for Best TV Actress
2012	Arman Bhai		Sagor Jahan		
2013	Opekkhay Thakun		Tuhin Hossain	Maasranga Television	Eid telefilm
2013	Chinno				
2013	Duti Britto Pashapashi				Nom: Meril-Prothom Alo Critics Choice Award for Best TV Actress
2013	Jodi Bhalo Na Lage Dio Na Mon		Raihan Khan		Won: Meril-Prothom Alo Award for Best TV Actress
2013	Onno Rokom Porir Golpo		R.B. Pritom		
2014	Bijli				Won: Meril-Prothom Alo Award for Best TV Actress
2014	Day Out		Humayun Rashid	Maasranga Television	Eid drama
2014	Golapbhromon		Mahmud Didar	NTV	Eid special
2014	Tumi Ami		Tuhin Hossain	NTV	Drama
2014	Let's Fly		Mizanur Rahman Aryan		
2014	Ratargul		Sumon Anowar		Eid special Drama
2014	Sikander Box	Kheya	Sagor Jahan		TV series (Episodes 1–4, 6, 15)
2014	Love and War		Imraul Rafat		
2015	Moner Moto Mon		Imraul Rafat		
2015	Page 16		Aarif A. Ahnaf		
2015	Happiness Is		Imraul Rafat		
2015	Ei Boishakhe		Shanta Rahman	ATN Bangla	Telefilm
2015	Silence		Emel Haque		
2015	Angry Bird		Mizanur Rahman Aryan	RTV	Telefilm
2015	All About Us				Valentine's Day special
2015	To Airport		Mizanur Rahman Aryan		Eid drama
2015	Gulbahar		Sumon Anowar		Eid special
2015	Monsuba Jongshon		Shihab Shaheen		
2015	Protikkha		Imraul Rafat		Close-Up Kache Ashar Shahoshi Golpo
2015	Shishir Kona		Abu Hayat Mahmud		
2015	Grihojuddho		Imraul Rafat		
2015	Tilottama, Tomar Jonno				Won: Meril-Prothom Alo Award for Best TV Actress
2015	Shefali				Won: Meril-Prothom Alo Critics Choice Award for Best TV Actress
2016	Addiction		Shafayet Mansoor Rana		
2016	Rupkotha		Mohammad Mostafa Kamal Raz	Channel i	Telefilm
2016	Kichu Bhul Kichu Oviman		Imraul Rafat		
2016	Ekti Talgach-er Golpo		Masud Sezan		Won: Meril-Prothom Alo Award for Best TV Actress
2016	Aadharer Rhen		Abu Hayat Mahmud		
2016	Tomay Bhebe Lekha		Shafquat Rabbee Anik	RTV	Valentine's Day drama
2016	Quiet Please		Rasel Shikdar		
2016	Boka Bax		Abu Hayat Mahmud		
2016	Pobitro Prem		Jakaria Showkhin		
2016	Firefly		Mabrur Rashid Bannah		
2016	Beauty Boat		Azad Abul Kalam		
2017	Sunte Ki Paw				Valentine's drama
2017	Follower		Masud Sezan	RTV	Drama
2017	Shongi		Shojib Khan	Rtv drama	
2017	Breakup Theory		Riyad Bin Mahbub		
2017	Mridumondo Bhalobasha		Somesor Ali	Maasranga Television	Drama
2017	Radhuni		Imraul Rafat	Maasranga Television	Special telefilm
2017	Pother Majher Golpo		Ashfaque Nipun		
2017	Money is Problem		Masud Sezan		
2017	Buker Bhitor Kichu Parthor Thaka Bhalo		Tanvir Ahsan	Bioscope original drama	Nom: Meril-Prothom Alo Critics Choice Award for Best TV Actress
2017	Trailer		Kochi Khondokar		
2017	Chinno Prem		Golam Sohrab Dodul		
2017	Cheleta Kintu Bhalo Chilo		Ashfaque Nipun		Chabial Reunion' drama
2017	Putuler Songshar		Ashutosh Sujon		
2017	Nishi Kutum	Salma/Pori	Mehedi Hasan Jony		
2017	Shaina Pru		Mahfuz Ahmed		Nom: Meril-Prothom Alo Award for Best TV Actress
2017	Chabial Reunion		Shoraf Ahmed Zibon		Mini-series, 7 episodes
2018	Koli 2.0	Koli	Abrar Athar	Bioscope original drama	
2018	Baba Tomay		Sumon Anowar		
2018	Tanaporen		Abu Hayat Mahmud		
2018	Aj Nitur Gaye Holud		Imraul Rafat	Valentine's Day special	
2018	Ayesha	Ayesha	Mostofa Sarwar Farooki	Channel I production	Nom: Meril-Prothom Alo Award for Best TV Actress; Nom: Meril-Prothom Alo Critics Choice Award for Best TV Actress
2018	Cholche Cholbe		Ashfaque Nipun	NTV	Eid special
2018	Ektu Hasho		Mabrur Rashid Bannah	Eid special drama	
2018	Mirror		Emel Haque	Gseries production	
2018	Rupkotha		Golam Muqtadir	Bioscope original web film	
2018	Shevolution				
2018	Cholona		Ashfaque Nipun	NTV	Eid drama
2018	Online E Raisa Bhabi		Topu Khan		
2018	Mistake		Jaqiul Islam Ripon	RTV	Drama
2018	Phoenix		Redoan Rony		
2018	Britto		Abu Hayat Mahmud		
2018	Choritra: Shami		Masud Sezan	Eid special	
2018	Shondha Komol		Sumon Anowar		
2019	Shorno Manob 2		Abu Hayat Mahmud		Customs Day special
2019	Shob Shomporker Naam Hoy Na		Kajal Arefin Ome		
2019	Kotha Deya Ache		Mizanur Rahman Aryan	RTV	Valentine's Day special drama
2019	Lovely Wife		Rushow Ahmed		Eid special
2019	Michael Mama Minu Khala		Abu Hayat Mahmud		
2019	#Me Too		Sazzad Sumon		
2019	Paye Paye Hariye		Imraul Rafat		
2019	Mone Mone Khub Gopone		Sraboni Ferdous		
2019	Ghore Baire		Abu Hayat Mahmud		Eid special drama
2019	Lady Killer 2		Mabrur Rashid Bannah		
2019	Friday Love		Topu Khan		Eid ul Adha special
2019	Shelai Ghor		Priti Dutta		Bangamata U-19 special
2019	Lolita		Arun Chowdhury		
2019	Nayika Hote Chai		Aranyo Anwar		
2019	Saudi Golap		Sagar Jahan		Mini-series
2019	Angule Angul		Mabrur Rashid Bannah		Eid special
2019	Lady Killer		Mabrur Rashid Bannah		Eid special drama
2020	Pori O Panir Botol		Masum Shahriar	RTV	On the occasion of International Customs Day
2020	Mukh O Mukhosher Golpo		Ashfaque Nipun	Bongo BD	
2020	Chelera Emonei Hoy	Tithi	Imraul Rafat	Banglavision & Global TV	

=== Short films ===
Year	Title	Character	Director	Notes
	Faad			

=== Web series ===
Year	Title	Character	OTT	Director	Notes
2018	Otopor Joya		Iflix	Arifur Rahman	iflix original web series
2019	Eternal Gift	Kuhu	Bioscope	Nazrul Islam Delgir	
2019	Blackmail		Binge	R B Pritam	
2020	Kuwasha		Bioscope	Mohammad Mostafa Kamal Raz	
2020	Ekattor	Joyita	Hoichoi	Tanim Noor	
2021	Ladies & Gentleman		ZEE5	Mostofa Sarwar Farooki	Producer
2021	Unoloukik		Chorki	Robiul Alam Robi	
2023	Something Like an Autobiography	Titi	Chorki	Mostofa Sarwar Farooki	Premiere at the BIFF in October.

== Awards and nominations ==
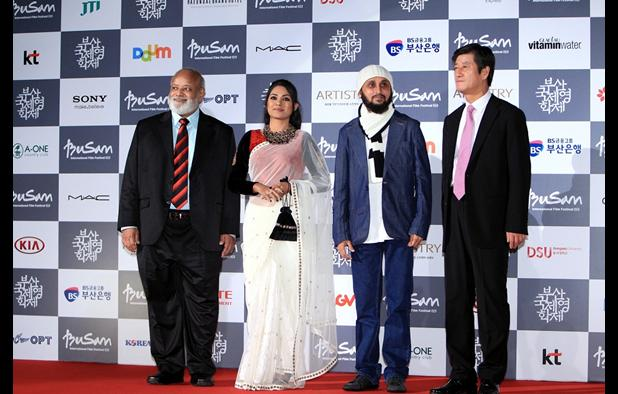
Tisha along with Shahir Huda Rumi and Mostofa Sarwar Farooki at 17th Busan International Film Festival in 2012

Bachsas Awards

Year	Category	Film	Result	Ref.(s)
2017	Best Actress	Haldaa	Won	

Meril-Prothom Alo Awards

Year	Category	Role	Film	Result	Ref.(s)
2009	Best Film Actress	Ruba Haque	Third Person Singular Number	Nominated	
2009	Choice Award for Best Film Actress	Ruba Haque	Third Person Singular Number	Won	
2013	Best Film Actress	Kohinoor	Television	Nominated	
2016	Best Film Actress	Pori	Ostitto	Nominated	
2017	Best Film Actress	Saberi	Doob	Won	

Year	Category	Television	Result	Ref.(s)
2005	Best TV Actress	Otopor Nurul Huda (2005)	Nominated	
2006	Best TV Actress	Otopor Nurul Huda (2005)	Nominated	
2008	Best TV Actress	Iit Kather Khancha (2008)	Nominated	
2009	Best TV Actress	Sathe	Nominated	
2010	Best TV Actress	Graduate	Won	
2011	Best TV Actress	Chander Nijosso Kono Aalo Nei (2011)	Nominated	
2011	Critics Choice Award for Best TV Actress	Tahminar Dinjapon (2011)	Won	
2012	Best TV Actress	Long March	Won	
2013	Best TV Actress	Jodi Bhalo Na Lage Dio Na Mon	Won	
2013	Critics Choice Award for Best TV Actress	Duti Britto Pashapashi (2013)	Nominated	
2014	Best TV Actress	Bijli	Won	
2015	Best TV Actress	Tilottama, Tomar Jonno	Won	
2015	Critics Choice Award for Best TV Actress	Shefali (2015)	Won	
2016	Best TV Actress	Ekti Talgach-er Golpo (2016)	Won	
2017	Best TV Actress	Soino Pru (2017)	Nominated	
2017	Critics Choice Award for Best TV Actress	Buker Bhetor Kichu Pathor Thaka Valo (2017)	Nominated	
2018	Best TV Actress	Ayesha (2018)	Nominated	
2018	Critics Choice Award for Best TV Actress	Ayesha (2018)	Nominated	

Year	Category	Result	Ref.(s)
2003	Best Female Model	Won	
2004	Best Female Model	Won	

National Film Award

Year	Category	Film	Result	Ref.(s)
2016	Best Actress	Ostitto	Won	
2017	Best Actress	Haldaa	Won	

Notun Kuri

Year	Category	Result	Ref.(s)
1993	Acting	Runner-up	
1995	Acting	Gold cup winner	

Rtv Star Award

Year	Category	Film	Result	Ref.(s)
2017	Best Actress (Series)	Mohiner Nil Towale	Nominated	
2018	Best Actress (Drama)	Lak Bhelki Laag	Nominated	
2019	1 Hours Drama & Telefilm Best Actress - Leading role	Asroy	Won	
2019	Drama series - Best Actress - Leading role	Dhama Offer	Won	
