= Television (2012 film) =

Bangladeshi Film (2012)

- Promotional poster
- Bengali: টেলিভিশন
- Directed by: Mostofa Sarwar Farooki
- Written by: Anisul Hoque; Mostofa Sarwar Farooki
- Produced by: Mostofa Sarwar Farooki
- Starring: Kazi Shahir Huda Rumi; Chanchal Chowdhury; Mosharraf Karim; Tisha
- Cinematography: Golam Maola Nobir
- Edited by: Razon Khaled
- Music by: Ayub Bachchu
- Production companies: Chabial; Mogador Film; Star Cineplex
- Distributed by: Ashirbad Cholochitro
- Release dates: October 2012 (Busan); 25 January 2013
- Running time: 106 minutes
- Country: Bangladesh
- Language: Bengali

Television (Bengali: টেলিভিশন) is a 2012 Bangladeshi drama film based on changing social values and adoption of technology directed by Mostofa Sarwar Farooki and starring Kazi Shahir Huda Rumi, Chanchal Chowdhury, Mosharraf Karim, and Tisha. The film was selected as the Bangladeshi entry for the Best Foreign Language Film at the 86th Academy Awards.

== Plot ==
As a leader of the local community, Chairman Amin (Shahir Huda Rumi) bans every kind of image in his water-locked village in rural Bangladesh. He even states that even imagination is sinful since it gives one the license to venture into any prohibited territory. But change is a desperate wind that is difficult to resist by shutting the window. The tension between this traditional window and modern wind grows to such an extent that it starts to leave a ripple effect on the lives of a group of typically colorful, eccentric, and emotional people living in that village which is embedded upon a sweet triangle love story involving the Chairman Amin's only son (Chanchal Chowdhury), a village girl (Nusrat Imrose Tisha) and their supporting connected employee (Mosharraf Karim). But at the very end of the film, Television, which Chairman Amin hated so much, comes to the rescue and helps to reach a transcendental state where he and his God are unified.

== Cast ==
- Kazi Shahir Huda Rumi as Amin Chairman
- Chanchal Chowdhury as Solaiman
- Mosharraf Karim as Mojnu
- Nusrat Imrose Tisha as Kohinoor
- Mukit Majumdar

== Production ==
The movie was directed by Mostofa Sarwar Farooki, who started out his career in television shows. The movie received the Asian Project Market 2010 of the Busan Festival. The movie was produced by Bangladeshi firm Chabial and had German co-producers. The movie was shot in Chandpur, Laxmipur, Noakhali, and Dhaka.

== Critical reception ==
Tisha in the film Television.

Television gained generally positive reviews. The Hollywood Reporter described it as ushering in a new era in Bangladeshi movies. Closing film at the 17th Busan International Film Festival (world premiere). It was Bangladesh's submission for Best Foreign Language Film at the 86th Academy Awards.

It won the Golden Hanuman Award at the 8th Jogja-NETPAC Asian Film Festival. It won the NETPAC award at the 19th Kolkata International Film Festival. It got a Special mention in the Muhr AsiaAfrica category at the 9th Dubai International Film Festival. It was screened at the 18th International Film Festival of Kerala, and the 37th Portland International Film Festival. As Television was screened in the Busan International Film Festival, it was subsequently released in South Korea on 7 November 2013.

List of awards and nominations
Ciromonies	Year	Category	Recipients and nominees	Result	Ref.(s)
Asia Pacific Screen Awards	2013	Jury Grand Prize	Mostofa Sarwar Farooki	Won	
Asia Pacific Screen Awards	2013	Best Screenplay	Mostofa Sarwar Farooki & Anisul Hoque	Nominated	
Meril-Prothom Alo Awards	2013	Best Film Actor	Mosharraf Karim	Nominated	
Meril-Prothom Alo Awards	2013	Best Film Actress	Nusrat Imrose Tisha	Nominated	

== See also ==
- List of submissions to the 86th Academy Awards for Best Foreign Language Film
- List of Bangladeshi submissions for the Academy Award for Best Foreign Language Film
