= Rumana Rashid Ishita =

Bangladeshi television actress, director, and writer

- রুমানা রশীদ ঈশিতা
- Ishita in 2026
- Born: 22 August 1980 (44)
- Occupations: Actress; model; writer
- Years active: 1988–present

Rumana Rashid Ishita (Birth: 22 August 1980) is a Bangladeshi television actress, director, and writer. She won the national talent competition, Notun Kuri, as a child artiste in 1988.

== Education ==
Ishita completed her bachelor's in 2004 and later completed her MBA. She is a former student of Holy Cross Girls' School and College.

== Career ==
In 2007, Ishita served as a marketing executive of the television channel Channel i and worked for 11 years. She is also a faculty member of a private university.

== Personal life ==
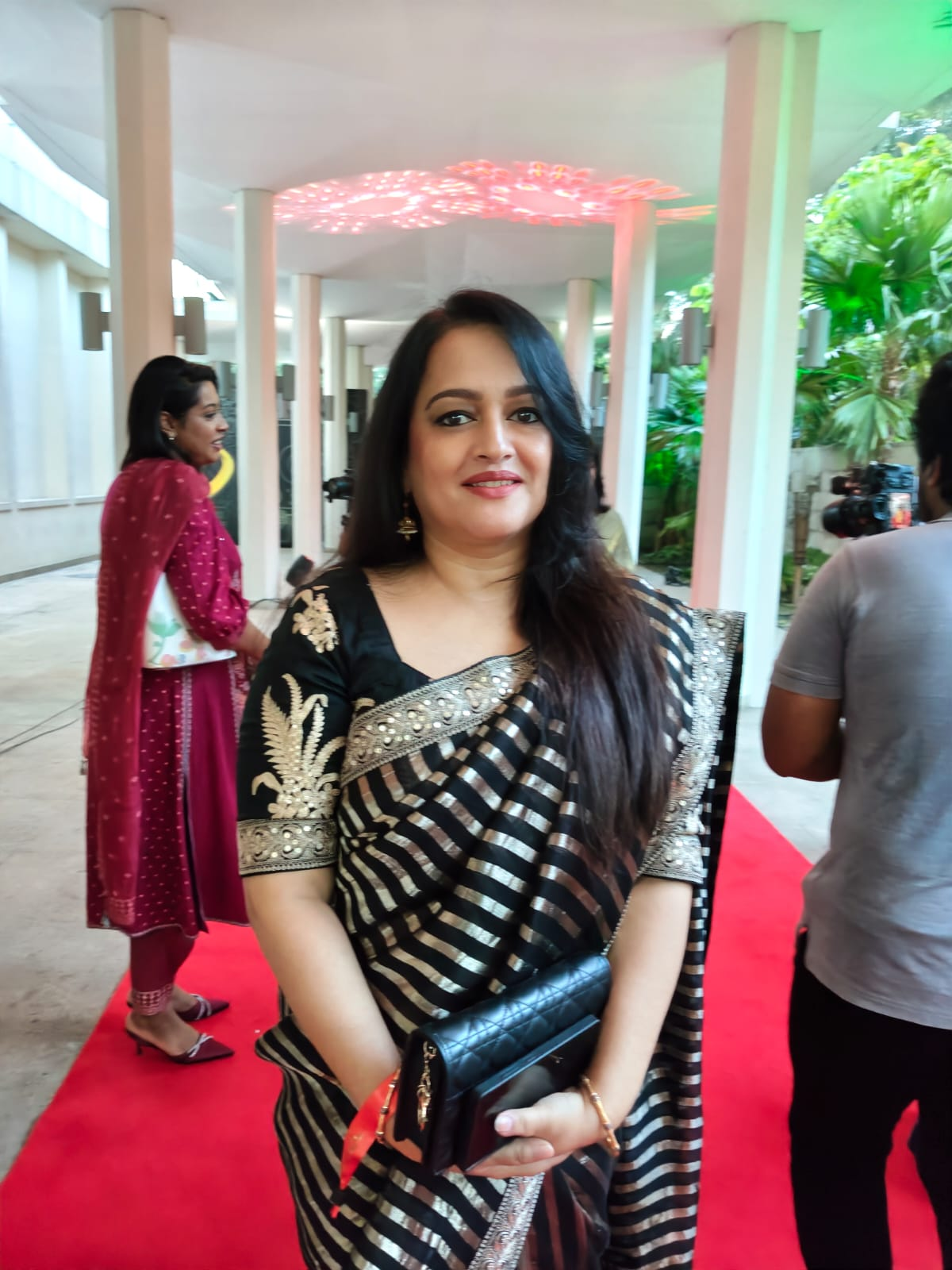
Rumana Rashid Ishita_Chorki_2026_Program

Ishita is a restaurateur. Singer Firoza Begum was her aunt-in-law.

== Works ==
- Ghotona Samanyo (1997)
- Nirjon Aranye
- Swapno Swapneel
- Godhuli Belaye
- Firey Ase Fire Asa
- Tumi Robe Nirobe (2008)
- Bipashar Jonno Bhalobasha (2002)
- Aparoopa (2005)
- Pata Jhorar Din (2018)

== Awards and nominations ==
Meril-Prothom Alo Awards

Year	Category	Work(s)	Result	Ref.(s)
2002	Best TV Actress	Bipashar Jonno Bhalobasha	Nominated	
2005	Best TV Actress	Aparoopa	Nominated	
2018	Critics Choice Award for Best TV Actress	Pata Jhorar Din	Won	
