= Bachsas Award for Best Actress =

The Bachsas Award for Best Actress is awarded by the Bachsas (Bangladesh Cholochitra Sangbadik Samity) Awards in Bangladesh.

== Winners ==
Year	Actress	Film
2018	Joya Ahsan	Debi
2017	Apu Biswas; Nusrat Imrose Tisha	Rajneeti; Halda
2016	Masuma Rahman Nabila	Aynabaji
2015	Bidya Sinha Saha Mim	Padmo Patar Jol
2014	Mahiya Mahi	Desha: The Leader
2013	Apu Biswas; Mahiya Mahi	My Name Is Khan; Bhalobasha Aaj Kal
2012	Bobita	Khodar Pore Ma
2011	Joya Ahsan	Guerrilla
2010	Moushumi	Golapi Ekhon Bilatey
2009	Popy (actress)	Gangajatra
2008	Popy and Moushumi (tie)	Ki Jadu Korila and Ekjon Sange Chhilo respectively
2005	Moushumi	Matritto
2003	Shabnur	Bou Shashurir Juddho
2002	Sadika Parvin Popy	Juari
2001	Moushumi	Bheja Beral
2000	Moushumi	Kosto
1999	Shabnur	Bhalobashi Tomake
1988	Kabari	Dui Jibon
1987	Shabana	Rajlakshmi Srikant
1986	Anjana	Parineeta
1985	Bobita	Dohon
1984	Rozina	Suruj Mia
1983	Nuton	Pran Sajani
1982	Shabana	Lal Kajol
1981	Suchorita	Jibon Nouka
1980	Bobita	
1978	Kabari	Sareng Bou
1977	Bobita	
1975	Kabari	Sujon Sokhi
1974	Bobita	Ashani Sanket
1973	Kabari	Lalon Fokir

== Superlatives ==
- 'Oldest Winner - Babita (64)
- Youngest Winner - Mahiya Mahi (20)

Most Awards

- Moushumi and Bobita - 5 awards
- Kabari - 4 awards
- Popy- 3 awards
- Shabana, Shabnur, Apu Biswas and Mahiya Mahi - 2 awards each
