= No Land's Man =

- Directed by: Mostofa Sarwar Farooki
- Screenplay by: Mostofa Sarwar Farooki
- Produced by: Mostofa Sarwar Farooki; Marina Fernandez Ferri; A.R. Rahman; Shrihari Sathe; Nawazuddin Siddiqui; Nusrat Imrose Tisha; Bongo
- Starring: Nawazuddin Siddiqui; Megan Mitchell; Eisha Chopra; Tahsan Rahman Khan
- Cinematography: Sheikh Rajibul Islam
- Music by: A. R. Rahman
- Production companies: Chabial; Dialectic; Magic If Films; Bongo
- Release date: 9 October 2021 (BIFF)
- Countries: United States; Bangladesh; India
- Language: English

No Land's Man is a 2021 drama film directed and written by Mostofa Sarwar Farooki. The film follows the journey of a South Asian man which becomes complicated when he meets an Australian woman in America. The plot of the film deals with fascism and identity crisis. It stars Nawazuddin Siddiqui, Eisha Chopra, Tahsan Rahman Khan among others. The film, a joint production of United States, India, Australia and Bangladesh is produced by Farooki, Shrihari Sathe, Nawazuddin Siddiqui, Anjan Chowdhury, Faridur Reza Sagar and Nusrat Imrose Tisha. A.R. Rahman also joins the film as an executive producer and music composer..

It premiered in the "A Window on Asian Cinema" section at 26th Busan International Film Festival, which held from 6 to 15 October 2021.

== Cast ==
- Nawazuddin Siddiqui as Naveen/ Sameer
- Megan Mitchell as Cathy
- Tahsan Rahman Khan
- Eisha Chopra
- Vikram Kochhar as Farookh
- Andreas Pliatsikas as CBP Officer Calloway
- Christian Andrew as Kidnapper
- Holly Fraser as Maria
- J. Brian as CBP Officer
- Philip O'Gorman as CBP Officer
- Wendy Heagy as NYPD Police Officer
- Michael S. Walls as Border Patrol Detainee
- Miguel Manzano as Daren
- David John Murdoch

as Officer Liam

- Ilya Zorin as Extras

== Pre-production ==
In 2014, the film was awarded the Script Development Fund in the Motion Picture Association and Asia Pacific Screen Awards, while being a part of the Asian Project Market at Busan International Film Festival. It was also chosen as the best project at India’s Film Bazaar. The film shot in the different locations in the United States, Australia and India.

== Release ==
No Land's Man will be premiered under the 'A Window on Asian Cinema' section at 26th Busan International Film Festival to be held from 6 to 15 October 2021. The film has also been nominated for Kim Jiseok award in Busan International Film Festival.

== Nomination ==
| Year | Award | Category | Recipient/ Nominee | Result | Ref. |
|---|---|---|---|---|---|
| 2021 | 26th Busan International Film Festival | Kim Jiseok award | No Land's Man | Nominated | |
