= Farzana Chobi =

Bangladeshi actress

- ফারজানা ছবি
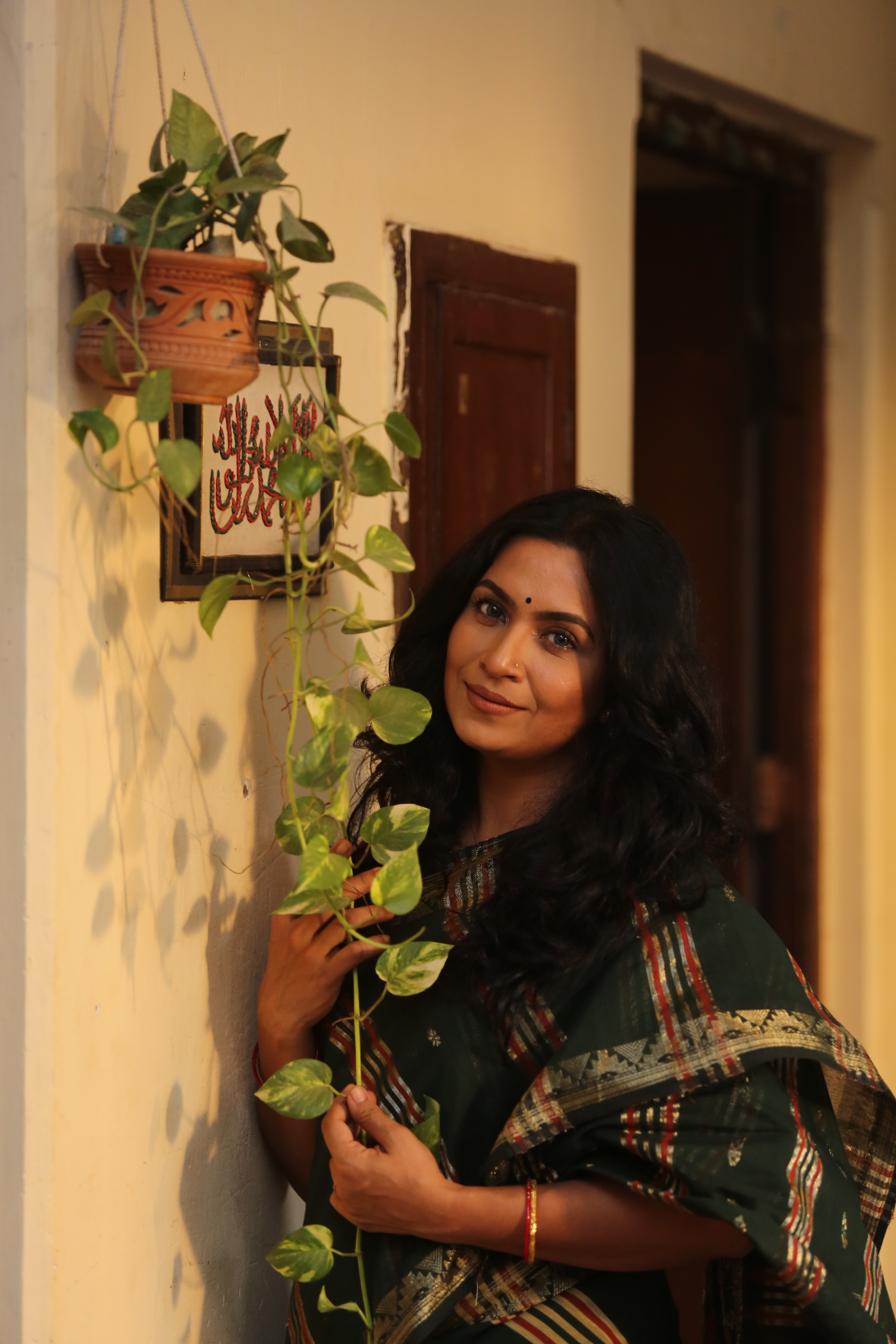
- Chobi in 2021
- Notable work: Vober Hat (2006); Pakhi Ebong Manushera (2013); Taan (2022)
- Spouse: Tanmoy Sarker (m. 2014)
- Children: 2
- Awards: Meril-Prothom Alo Critics Choice Award (2013)
- Website: www.farzanachobi.com

Farzana Chobi, (Note: Also spelt as Farzana Chhoby) better known as Chobi, is a Bangladeshi actress and model who works in Bengali dramas, films and documentaries. For her role in the drama Shimana Periye (2013), she received the Meril-Prothom Alo Critics Choice Award for Best TV Actress. Her notable works include Vober Hat (2006), Pakhi Ebong Manushera (2013) and Taan (2022).

== Personal life ==
Chobi married her long-time boyfriend, Tanmoy Sarker, in May 2014. He is an associate professor at Dhaka Commerce College. They have two sons, Avirup Sarker (b. 2014) and Anirban Sarker "Adrik" (b. 2016).

== Career ==
Farzana Chobi made her acting debut in 1998 with Abdullah Al Mamun's Chithi. Farzana was awarded the Merill-Prothom Alo Award in 2013 for best TV actor for her performance in the play Shimana Periye, directed by Matia Banu Shuku. She took a brief sabbatical in 2014 after the birth of her son. She returned to television in 2015, with Banu Shuku's Bini Shutor Mala.

Her 2019 film Maa, directed by Aranyo Anawer, was screened at the 76th Cannes Film Festival.

== Work ==
=== Filmography ===
Year	Title	Role	Director	Notes
	Kanamachi		Anjan Aich	
2002	Lal Golap			
2010	Jol			
2011	Jibono Morono Shimana Charaya			
2015	Holud Pata Jorar Golpo			
2016	Ronger Dunia			
2017	Nodi Kabbo			
2017	Mohuwa Shundori			
2019	Oporajita		Shahid Mahmood Abir, Asima Kamal Mouni, Tanzir Ahmed Sunny, Fahmida Alam Leena, Mohammad Sunny	Short film
2020	Joynagar Er Jomidar			
2020	Pitree Shotta			
2021	Janaker Mukh		Mannan Hira	
2022	Taan		Raihan Rafi	
2022	Nishwas		Raihan Rafi	
2023	Maa		Aranna Anwar	
	Mrittunjoyi	Padma Das		Government-funded films
	Janani Janmabhumi		Nadia Afrin	
	Joshna Rater Golpo			
	Poncho Nari Akkan			

=== Television ===
Year	Title	Director	Notes
1994	Bewan Shaheb		Drama serial
1996	Shat Number Bar		Drama serial
1998	Ohornish Valobase Akjon		Drama serial
2001	Sheowla		Drama serial
2001	Rong Berong		Drama serial
2001	Priobash		Drama serial
2002	Joba Kushum		Drama serial
2004	Godhuli Logney		Drama serial
2005	Labonno Tomake		Drama serial
2006-2007	Vober Hat	Salauddin Lavlu	Drama serial
2006	Meghla Nodi		Drama serial
2007	Nowka Dubi		Drama serial
2007	Fire Dekha		Drama serial
2007	Boiry shajon		Drama serial
2007	Mone Chuta Jay		Drama serial
2007	Troyee		Drama serial
2007	Suborno Lota		Drama serial
2008	Gunin		Drama serial
2008	Tamasha		Drama serial
2008	Chinno Monjuri		Drama serial
2008	Nondon Kanon		Drama serial
2008	Jol Foring Er Gan		Drama serial
2008	Nobo Rotno		Drama serial
2008	Ake Shunno Dosh		Drama serial
2008	Chhay		Drama serial
2009	Nir Khonje Gangchil		Drama serial
2009	Ponditer Mela		Drama serial
2009	Jamai Shoshur		Drama serial
2009	Pothe Pothe Choltey Choltey		Drama serial
2009	Dosh Bochor Por		Drama serial
2010	Oyarish		Drama serial
2010	Ma Serial- 'Tunir Ma'		Drama serial
2010	Gents trailers		Drama serial
2010	Mati		Drama serial
2010	Shuvo Jatra		Drama serial
2010	Hoi Hoi Roi Roi		Drama serial
2010	Badh Vanga Joyar		Drama serial
2010	Gowhar Baida		Drama serial
2010	Konnya Kumari		Drama serial
2010	Dora Kata		Drama serial
2010	Kancher Ful		Drama serial
2010	Protishodh		Drama serial
2010	Agontuk		Drama serial
2010	Shomudro Bashona		Drama serial
2010	Angshik Shada Kalo		Drama serial
2011	Mon Putuler Bioscope		Drama serial
2011	Valobasher Shat Rong		Drama serial
2011	Voddonnok		Drama serial
2011	Family Affaire		Drama serial
2011	Rongela Koytor		Drama serial
2011	Titas Parer Shuborno Gram		Drama serial
2011	Adhar Periye		Drama serial
2011	Omongol		Drama serial
2011	Ronger Songser		Drama serial
2011	Ammajaan Jindabad		Drama serial
2011	Boire Sojon		Drama serial
2011	Pita Mata Shontan		Drama serial
2011	Shontoron		Drama serial
2011	Bish Top		Drama serial
2011	Shuk Pakhi		Drama serial
2011	Bou Ma		Drama serial
2012	Diba Nishi		Drama serial
2012	Kada Matir Manusera		Drama serial
2012	Dur Paharer Batashera		Drama serial
2012	Higibigi		Drama serial
2012	Club Ghor		Drama serial
2012	Ranna Bari		Drama serial
2012	Will		Drama serial
2013	Pakhi Ebong Manushera		Drama serial
2013	Poyomonto		Drama serial
2013	Jonaki		Drama serial
2013	Roser Hari		Drama serial
2013	Akash Meghe Dhaka		Drama serial
2013	Ovibashi		Drama serial
2013	Shimabaddho Manushera		Drama serial
2013	Purba		Drama serial
2013	Porompora		Drama serial
2013	Kushum Koli		Drama serial
2013	Shonali Megeher Vela		Drama serial
2013	Teen Vubon		Drama serial
2014	Jibon Songshar		Drama serial
2015	Bia Bari		Drama serial
2015	O Amar Chhokku nai		Drama serial
2015	Ronger Mela		Drama serial
2016	Orokitto Simana		Drama serial
2016	Progga Paromita		Drama serial
2017	Boitorone		Drama serial
2017	Kazi Shahebar Tin Putro		Drama serial
2017	Hashi Kushi.Com		Drama serial
2017	Nagor Ali Kumkum		Drama serial
2017	Bondhu Bote		Drama serial
2017	Rupali Prantor		Drama serial
2018	Mecho Tota Gecho Voot		Drama serial
2018	Valobasha Tumi		Drama serial
2018	Lucky Thirteen		Drama serial
2018	Shona Van		Drama serial
2018	Takkor		Drama serial
2018	Moger Mulluk		Drama serial
2019	Tolpar		Drama serial
2019	Otithi		Drama serial
2019	Trigiri Tokka		Drama serial
2019	Tipu Sultan		Drama serial
2019	Dhaka Metro		Drama serial
2020	Tahader Shuk dukko		Drama serial
2020	Songkota Songkot		Drama serial
2020	Kajol Rekha		Drama serial
2022	Bou Birodh		Drama
2022	Bokul Pur		Drama serial
2022	Jamai Bahar		Drama serial
2022	Beyai Shab		Drama serial
	Jagath Sangsar	Rhythm Khan Shahin	Drama serial
2012, 2015, 2018, 2021, 2022	DB		Drama serial
	Simple Love Story-19		Drama

== Awards ==
- Meril-Prothom Alo Critics Choice Award for Best TV Actress, for her work in Shimana Periye (2013)
