= 12th Meril-Prothom Alo Awards =

2010 Bangladeshi TV and film awards

12th Meril Prothom Alo Awards
- Date: April 9, 2010
- Site: Hall of Fame Theatre, Bangabandhu International Conference Center, Dhaka, Bangladesh
- Hosted by: Ferdous Ahmed, Chanchal Chowdhury and Mosharraf Karim
- Preshow hosts: Jannatul Ferdoush Peya
- Produced by: Transcom Group, Square Toiletries

Highlights
- Best Picture: Third Person Singular Number
- Most awards: Third Person Singular Number
- Most nominations: Third Person Singular Number

Television coverage
- Network: Channel i
- Duration: 1 hours, 29 minutes

The 12th Meril Prothom Alo Awards ceremony, presented by Prothom Alo, took place on April 9, 2010, at the Bangabandhu International Conference Center in Dhaka, Bangladesh as a part of 2009-10 film awards season.

== Awards and winners ==
A total of 12 awards were given at the ceremony. Following is the list of the winners:

=== Lifetime Achievement Award - 2010 ===
- Renowned singer of Nazrul song Shudhin Das

=== Public Choice Awards - 2009 ===
Best Film Actor	Best Film Actress
Chanchal Chowdhury – Monpura; Mamnun Hasan Emon – Piritir Agun Jwole Digun; Mosharraf Karim - Third Person Singular Number; Riaz – Protarok; Shakib Khan – Bolbo Kotha Bashor Ghorey	Shabnur - Bolbo Kotha Bashor Ghorey; Apu Biswas – Mone Boro Kosto; Nusrat Imroz Tisha - Third Person Singular Number; Farhana Mili – Monpura; Bidya Sinha Saha Mim – Priya Amar Priya
Best TV Actor	Best TV Actress
Mosharraf Karim – Houseful; Ziaul Faruq Apurba – X Factor; Fazlur Rahman Babu – Dainik Tolpar; Chanchal Chowdhury – Parti Chai; Zahid Hasan - Eka	Joya Ahsan - Tarpor O Angurlata Nando Ke Bhalobashey; Tarin Ahmed – Tumi Amar Stri; Nusrat Imroz Tisha – Sathe; Richi Solaiman – Tomar Doyay Bhalo Achhi Ma; Sumaiya Shimu – Lolita
Best Male Singer	Best Female Singer
Habib Wahid – Dwidha (Third Person Singular Number); Ayub Bachchu – Bolini Tomay; Asif Akbar – Bodhu Khobor Tor Kire; Balam – Shopner Prithibi; Hridoy Khan – Bolna Tui Bolna	Nazmun Munira Nancy – Dwidha (Third Person Singular Number); Kanak Chapa – Bolbo Kotha Bashor Ghorey (Bolbo Kotha Bashor Ghorey); Mila Islam – Tumi Ki Shara Dibe; Shirin Jawad – Matowali; Julee – Shopner Prithibi

=== Critic's Choice Awards - 2009 ===
Best Film	Best Film Director
Faridur Reza Sagar (Impress Telefilm Limited) - Third Person Singular Number; Faridur Reza Sagar (Impress Telefilm Limited) – Gangajatra; Masraanga Films – Monpura	Mostofa Sarwar Farooki - Third Person Singular Number; Giasuddin Selim – Monpura; Syed Wahiduzzaman Diamond – Gangajatra
Best Film Actor	Best Film Actress
Mamunur Rashid - Monpura; Chanchal Chowdhury – Monpura; Riaz – Mon Chhuyechhe Mon	Nusrat Imrose Tisha - Third Person Singular Number; Farhana Mili - Monpura; Shimla - Gangajatra
Best Playwright	Best TV Director
Nurul Alam Atique - Bikol Pakhir Gaan; Ashrafee Mithu – Chhuti; Shibu Kumar Sheel – Keu Nei Shunnota	Nurul Alam Atique - Bikol Pakhir Gaan; Amitabh Reza Chowdhury – Is Equal Two; Wahid Tareque – Somporker Golpo
Best TV Actor	Best TV Actress
Fazlur Rahman Babu - Panjabiwala; Azad Abul Kalam – Dwito Jibon; Ahmed Rubel – Lolita	Naoha Munir Dihan - Bikol Pakhir Gaan

=== Special Critics' Award - 2009 ===
- Topu - Third Person Singular Number

== Presenters and performances ==
=== Presenters ===
Presenter	Role
Kaiyum Chowdhury, Anjan Chowdhury & Matiur Rahman	Presented Lifetime Achievement Award
Runa Laila & Alam Khan	Presented Public Choice Award for Best Singer (Male)
Bappa Mazumder & Fahmida Nabi	Presented Public Choice Award for Best Singer (Female)
Mahfuz Ahmed & Aupee Karim	Presented Public Choice Award for Best TV Actor
Tauquir Ahmed & Bipasha Hayat	Presented Public Choice Award for Best TV Actress
Jewel Aich & Bipasha Aich	Presented Critics’ Choice Award for Best TV Director
Shahiduzzaman Selim & Parveen Sultana Diti	Presented Critics’ Choice Award for Best Playwright
Al Mansur & Mita Chowdhury	Presented Critics’ Choice Award for Best TV Actor
Azizul Hakim & Afsana Mimi	Presented Critics’ Choice Award for Best TV Actress
Suborna Mustafa & Raisul Islam Asad	Presented Public Choice Award for Best Film Actor
Ferdous Ahmed & Moushumi	Presented Public Choice Award for Best Film Actress
Masud Ali Khan & Dilara Zaman	Presented Critics’ Choice Award for Best Film
Ilias Kanchan & Aruna Biswas	Presented Critics’ Choice Award for Best Film Director
Farooque & Kobori	Presented Critics’ Choice Award for Best Film Actor and Special Critics’ Award for film
Alamgir & Rozina	Presented Critics’ Choice Award for Best Film Actress

=== Performances ===
Performer(s)	Performance on
Ferdous Ahmed, Mozeza Ashraf Monalisa, Zakia Bari Momo, Badhon, Munmun, Prova & others	Instrumental
Rezwana Chowdhury Bannya, Fatema Tuz Zuhora and Aupee Karim & her troupe	Eso Shyamol Sundoro, Shukno Patar Nupur
Shakib Khan, Bindu, Mim, & Shokh	Combo of Number One Shakib Khan, Ki Jadu Korechho, Mone Baromash, Moner Bhitor
Habib Wahid, Nancy, Topu-Nusrat Imrose Tisha, Shajal-Sarika and Fardin-Nowshin	Dwidha
Kumar Bishwajit	Jegey Otho Bangladesh

== See also ==
- National Film Awards
- Bachsas Awards
- Babisas Award
