= Afsana Mimi =

Bangladeshi actress (born 1968)

- আফসানা মিমি
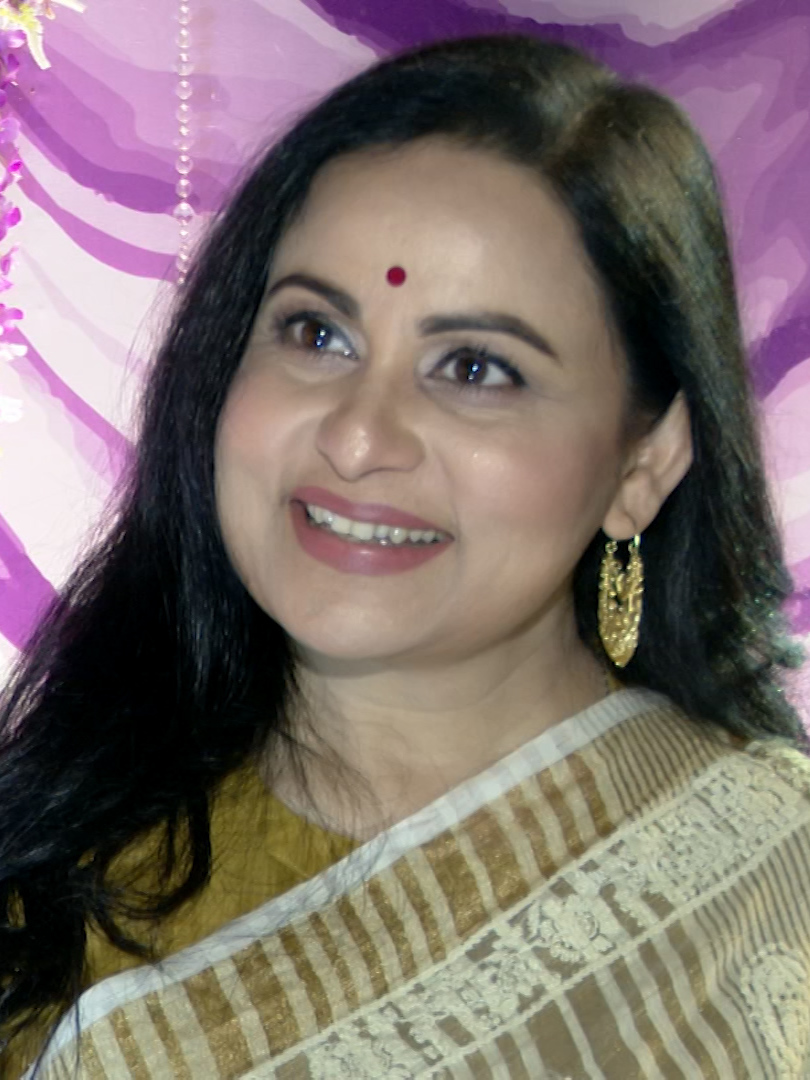
- Mimi in 2021
- Born: Afsana Karim Mimi; 20 December 1968 (age 57); Dhaka, East Pakistan, Pakistan
- Education: University of Dhaka
- Occupations: Actress, model, script-writer, television director
- Years active: 1990–present
- Spouse: Gazi Rakayet (m. 1989; div. 1996)

Afsana Karim Mimi (known as Afsana Mimi; born 20 December 1968) is a Bangladeshi actress, model and director. She won Bangladesh National Film Award for Best Supporting Actress for her role in the film Paap Punno (2022).

== Early life ==
Afsana Karim Mimi was born on 20 December 1968 at Holy Family Hospital, Dhaka in the then East Pakistan. Her father, Syed Fazlul Karim (d. 2024), worked at Bangladesh Water Development Board. Her mother is Shireen Afroze. Her maternal ancestors are from Bagerhat.

== Career ==
Mimi started her acting career through the theatre troupe Nagorik Natya Sampradaya. Her last play was Prachyanat's Raja Ebong Onnanno in 2011. Mimi got her breakthrough in acting in Bengali television drama Kothao Keu Nei in 1992-1993.

Mimi started directing in 2000. She directed Kaser Manush. She worked on a cooking show on ATN News named Nostalgia.

Mimi served as the director of Department of Theatre and Film at Shilpakala Academy in 2020–2023. She is the director of Ichchhetola, a cultural centre in Dhaka. She owns 'Green Screen, a production house which produced works like "Doll's House", "Kacher Manush" and "Poush Falguner Pala".

== Works ==
Films
Name	Year	Role	Director
Nodir Naam Modhumoti	1996	Rahela	Tanvir Mokammel
Chitra Nodir Pare	1999	Minoti	Tanvir Mokammel
Priyotomeshu	2009	Nishat	Morshedul Islam
Paap Punno	2022	Parul	Giasuddin Selim
Utshob	2025	Jasmine	Tanim Noor

Television Drama
Name	Year	Role	Director/Playwriter
Kothao Keu Nei	1992-1993	Bokul	Humayun Ahmed
Nokkhotrer Raat	1995		
Kotha Dilam	1998		
Badhon	1996		
Sei Meyeti			
Pouno Punik			
Nater Guru			
Biporite Hit	2000	Mili	Hanif Sanket
Housewife			
Loket			
Sobujsathi			
Kata			
Bedonar Rong Nil			
Bondhon			
Amar 8 E Falgun			
Campus e Romance			
Vokatta			
Akash Jora Megh			
Mrittor opare			
Sesh Chitir Pore			
Ekti Choto Golpo			
Jibon Jemon			
Tritio Pokkho			
Biswas			
Bhalobeshechile			
Nissobde			
Atoshi			Mansurul Aziz
Rohosso Bari			
Kalo Chithi			
Firey Ashar Golpo			
Meghla Manush			
Naa			
Proshne tumi			
Dorjar Opare			
Natok ebong Bonolota Sen			
Shyankal			
Moddho Rate Sathmail			
Antaray			
Koiekjon Oporadhi			
Kushum Kahini			
Jana Ojana			
Opare Niloy			

Director

- Doll's House (2007-2009)
- Poush Phaguner Pala (2012)
- Samantaral
- Biprotip
- Nairit
- Bonhi

=== Web series ===
- Nikhoj (2022)
- Mohanagar 2 (2023)
