= Richi Solaiman =

Bangladeshi actress and model

- রিচি সোলায়মান
- Born: Rita Faria Richi; Dhaka, Bangladesh
- Education: University of Asia Pacific (BBA)
- Occupations: Actress, model
- Spouse: Rashekur Rahman Malik (28 February 2008-Present)

Richi Solaiman is a Bangladeshi film and television actress and model.

== Early life ==
Richi Solaiman was born in Dhaka, Bangladesh. Her father, M. M. Solaiman, was a businessman. She took her early education from Saint Judes Tutorial School in Dhaka. After completing her school education she pursued a bachelor's degree in business administration from University of Asia Pacific.

== Career ==
Solaiman started her career as an actress through the BTV serial Bela O Bela (1998) cast opposite Tony Diaz. Till 2015, she worked in numerous telefilms, dramas, serials, and television commercials. She made her big screen acting debut in the film Nirab Prem directed by Shahnewaz Kakoli.

== Personal life ==
Solaiman married an American expatriate, Rashekur Rahman Malik, on 14 December 2008. They have a son, Rayan Malik and a daughter, Ilma Malik.

== Dramas ==
Year	Title	Director	Notes
2008	Khwabnama	Shumon Anwar	
2015	Dahan		
2015	Palta Hawa		
2015	Comedy and Colony		
2016	Khoye Jawa Buker Bhetor		
