= 11th Meril-Prothom Alo Awards =

2009 Bangladeshi TV and film awards

11th Meril Prothom Alo Awards
- Date: 10 April 2009
- Site: Hall of Fame Theatre, Bangabandhu International Conference Center, Dhaka, Bangladesh
- Hosted by: Ferdous Ahmed and Aupee Karim
- Preshow hosts: Munmun
- Produced by: Transcom Group, Square Toiletries

Highlights
- Best Film: Chandragrohon
- Best Actor: Shakib Khan; Priya Amar Priya
- Best Actress: Shabnur; Ek Takar Bou
- Lifetime achievement: Baby Islam

Television coverage
- Channel: ATN Bangla
- Duration: 1 hours, 05 minutes

The 11th Meril Prothom Alo Awards were distributed among TV and film stars and singers 10 April 2009 to honour and inspire the young talents for playing their role in the fields of music, film-making and TV production. The Bangladesh-China Friendship Conference Centre turned into a union of cultural personalities on that evening as the Prothom Alo and Square Toiletries staged the programme to honour the stars. The nominations for the popular awards were open to public voting.

== Awards and nominations ==
=== Lifetime Achievement Award – 2009 ===
- Noted cameraman and film director Baby Islam

=== Public Choice Awards – 2008 ===
| Best Film Actor | Best Film Actress |
|---|---|
| Shakib Khan – Priya Amar Priya; Mamnun Hasan Emon – Ek Buk Bhalobasa; Riaz – Akash Chhoa Bhalobasa; Zahid Hasan – Amar Ache Jol | Shabnur – Ek Takar Bou; Apu Biswas – Ek Buk Bhalobasa; Purnima – Akash Chhoa Bhalobasa; Meher Afroz Shaon – Amar Ache Jol |
| Best TV Actor | Best TV Actress |
| Mahfuz Ahmed – Amader Nurul Huda; Ziaul Faruq Apurba – Iit Kather Khancha; Fazlur Rahman Babu – Dainik Tolpar; Mosharraf Karim – 420 | Sumaiya Shimu – Shopnochura; Tarin Ahmed – Nirobini; Nusrat Imroz Tisha – Iit Kather Khancha; Richi Solaiman – Nishithe |
| Best Male Singer | Best Female Singer |
| Habib Wahid – Bolchi Tomake; Asif Akbar – Ek Phota Ashru; Topu – Bondhu Bhabo Ki; Balam – Balam 2 | Kazi Krishnakoli Islam – Jao Pakhi; Anila Naz Chowdhury – Bondhu Bhabo Ki; Baby Naznin – Priyotom; Samina Chowdhury – Tumi Amar Porichoy |

=== Critics' Choice Awards – 2008 ===
| Best Film | Best Film Director |
|---|---|
| Azom Faruk – Chandragrohon; Vision – Akash Chhoa Bhalobasa; Faridur Reza Sagar (Impress Telefilm Limited) – Amar Ache Jol | Murad Parvez – Chandragrohon; SA Haque Alik – Akash Chhoa Bhalobasa; Humayun Ahmed – Amar Ache Jol |
| Best Film Actor | Best Film Actress |
| Raisul Islam Asad – Liliputera Boro Hobe; Riaz – Akash Chhoa Bhalobasa; Sohel Rana – Shopnopuron | Bidya Sinha Saha Mim – Amar Ache Jol; Purnima – – Akash Chhoa Bhalobasa; Munmun Ahmed – Amar Ache Jol |
| Best Playwright | Best TV Director |
| Nurul Alam Atique & Ronjon Rabbani- Ekti Phone Kora Jabe Please?; Animesh Aich – Nodir Naam Nayontara; Alvee Ahmed – Kusum o Murkho Mofizer Golpo | Amitabh Reza Chowdhury – Ekti Phone Kora Jabe Please?; Animesh Aich – Nodir Naam Nayontara; Shahnewaz Kakoli – Onek Kartik Ograhayon |
| Best TV Actor | Best TV Actress |
| Mosharraf Karim – Deyal Almari; Abul Hayat – Nodir Naam Nayontara; Musafir Syed – Emon Deshti Kothao Khujhe Pabe Nako Tumi | Monira Mithu – Emon Deshti Kothao Khujhe Pabe Nako Tumi; Nowrin Jahan Zenny – Ekti Phone Kora Jabe Please?; Sabrin Saka Meem – Nodir Naam Nayontara |
| Best Music | Best Band |
| Deepto – Ekti Sorol Ongko; Shayan Chowdhury Arnob – Doob; Bappa Mazumder – Surjo Snane Chol | Aurthohin – Aushomapto I; Doorbin – Doorbin 2.01; Face 2 Face – Dukkho Poka; Black – Abar |

=== Special Critics' Awards – 2008 ===
| Category | Awardee |
|---|---|
| Best Film | SA Haque Alik (Akash Chhoa Bhalobasa) |
| Best Dancer | Sharmila Bandopadhaya |

== Host and Jury Board ==
Noted silver screen artiste Ferdous Ahmed and TV actress Aupee Karim conducted the colourful program with their lively and witty anchoring. Award-winning comedian Naveed came up on the dais to present his stand-up comedy to the fun-loving audience who gave him a big round of applause. The member of Jury Board for Dance section were Kamrunnesa Hasan, Lubna Mariam, and Arun Basu; Jury Board for music section were Alam Khan, Sheikh Sadi Khan, Sujay Sham, Shadi Muhammad, and Kanak Chapa; Jury Board for Television section Ramendu Majumdar, Syed Monzurul Islam, Tariq Anam Khan, Shamim Akhter, Zahedur Rahim Anjan, and Sazzad Sharif; and Jury Board for Film section were Hasnat Abdul Hai, Shibli Sadiq, Tareque Masud, Ilias Kanchan, Sabbir Ahmed Chowdhury, A.K.M. Jakariya.

== Presenters and performers ==
=== Presenters ===
| Presenter(s) | Role |
|---|---|
| Mostafa Zaman Abbasi -Asma Abbasi, Anjan Chowdhury & Matiur Rahman | Presented Lifetime Achievement Award |
| Barkatullah & Jinat Barkatullah | Presented Critics' Award for Best Dancer |
| Jewel Aich & Bipasha Aich | Presented Critics' Award for Best Music |
| Shimul Yousuf & Nasiruddin Yousuff | Presented Critics' Choice Award for Best TV Director |
| Moushumi & Omor Sani | Presented Critics' Choice Award for Best Playwright |
| Nima Rahman & Tariq Anam Khan | Presented Critics' Choice Award for Best TV Actor |
| Sara Zaker & Aly Zaker | Presented Critics' Choice Award for Best TV Actress |
| Bulbul Ahmed & Daisy Ahmed | Presented Special Critics' Award for Film |
| Wahida Mollick Jolly & Rahmat Ali | Presented Critics' Choice Award for Best Film |
| Catherine Masud & Tareque Masud | Presented Critics' Choice Award for Best Film Director |
| Ferdousi Mazumder & Ramendu Majumdar | Presented Critics' Choice Award for Best Film Actor |
| Azizul Hakim & Jinat Hakim | Presented Critics' Choice Award for Best Film Actress |
| Monir Khan Shimul & Nadia Ahmed | Presented Public Choice Award for Best Singer (Male) |
| Rafiqul Alam & Abida Sultana | Presented Public Choice Award for Best Singer (Female) |
| Shawkat Ali Emon & Bijori Barkatullah | Presented Public Choice Award for Best Band |
| Lucky Enam & Enamul Haque | Presented Public Choice Award for Best TV Actor |
| Rosy Selim & Shahiduzzaman Selim | Presented Public Choice Award for Best TV Actress |
| Pijush Bandyopadhyay & Joyosree Kar Joya | Presented Public Choice Award for Best Film Actor |
| M. Hamid & Falguni Hamid | Presented Public Choice Award for Best Film Actress |

=== Performers ===
| Performer(s) | Performance on |
|---|---|
| Troups | Dur Dwipobasini |
| Abida Sultana, Nirob-Badhon, Shajal-Bindu | Bimurto Ei Ratri Amar |
| Kazi Krishnakoli Islam, Ziaul Faruq Apurba & Prova | Sonaro Palonker Ghore |
| Debashish Biswas, Tonima Hamid, Ijajul Islam, Hasan Masud, Mosharraf Karim, Chanchal Chowdhury, Majnun Mijan | Meril Prothom Alo Norsundor Puroskar |
| Shakib Khan, Apu Biswas, Rasi, Keya | Combo of Oi Dur Durante, Tumi Jekhane Ami Sekhane, Chander Sathe Ami, Mon Dilam Pran Dilam |
| Raisul Islam | Read Ekattorer Chithi |
| Subir Nandi, Abida Sultana, Tapon Chawdhury, Sakila Jafor, Sajib | Desher Gaan |

== See also ==
- National Film Awards
- Bachsas Awards
- Babisas Award
