= 16th Meril-Prothom Alo Awards =

2014 Bangladeshi TV and film awards

16th Meril Prothom Alo Awards
- Date: 25 April 2014
- Site: Hall of Fame Theatre, Bangabandhu International Conference Center, Dhaka, Bangladesh
- Hosted by: Jewel Aich, Shaju Khadem
- Preshow hosts: Jannatul Ferdoush Peya
- Produced by: Transcom Group, Square Toiletries
- Directed by: Mohammad Hannan

Highlights
- Best Film: Mrittika Maya
- Best Actor: Shakib Khan; Purno Doirgho Prem Kahini
- Best Actress: Joya Ahsan; Purno Doirgho Prem Kahini
- Lifetime achievement: Nayok Raj Razzak
- Most awards: Purno Doirgho Prem Kahini (3)
- Most nominations: Purno Doirgho Prem Kahini (5)

Television coverage
- Channel: Maasranga Television
- Duration: 1 hours, 29 minutes

The 16th Meril Prothom Alo Awards ceremony, presented by Prothom Alo, took place on 25 April 2014 at the Bangabandhu International Conference Center in Dhaka, Bangladesh, as a part of the 2013–14 film awards season.

== Facts and figures ==
This was the 16th award ceremony of the Meril Prothom Alo Awards. Mrittika Maya won the awards of best film category as well as Rakhal Sobuj was awarded for Critics Choice best actor for this film combinedly with Raisul Islam Asad. Purno Doirgho Prem Kahini was nominated for 5 awards including 2 Public Choice best actor – Shakib Khan and Arifin Shuvoo, Public Choice best actress, Public Choice best singer male and female and won three awards. Tahsan-Mithila couple was nominated for Public Choice best TV actor and actresses for Landphoner Dingulote Prem. Nusrat Imroz Tisha had two nominations in Public choice best film and TV actress and secured best TV actress for Jodi Bhalo Na Lage Dio Na Mon. Nazmun Munir Nancy got best singer award fifth time in a row from 2009 to 2013.

== Winners and nominees ==
14 awards were given in this ceremony and are listed below:

=== Lifetime Achievement Award – 2014 ===
- Nayok Raj Razzak

=== Public Choice Awards – 2013 ===
Best Film Actor	Best Film Actress
Shakib Khan – Purno Doirgho Prem Kahini; Ananta Jalil – Nisharto Bhalobasa; Arifin Shuvoo – Purno Doirgho Prem Kahini; Mosharraf Karim – Television	Joya Ahsan – Purno Doirgho Prem Kahini; Moushumi – Devdas; Mahiya Mahi – Onnorokom Bhalobasa; Nusrat Imroz Tisha – Television
Best TV Actor	Best TV Actress
Mosharraf Karim – Sikandar Box Ekhon Birat Model; Chanchal Chowdhury – Idiot; Zahid Hasan – Korta Kahini; Tahsan – Landphoner Dingulote Prem	Nusrat Imroz Tisha – Jodi Bhalo Na Lage Dio Na Mon; Aupee Karim – Akashlina; Sumaiya Shimu – Radio Chocolate Reloded; Mithila – Landphoner Dingulote Prem
Best Singer (Male)	Best Singer (Female)
Asif Akbar – Ex Prem; Imran Mahmudul- Jonom Jonom; Arfin Rumey – Mon Chuye Dekho; Chondon Sinha – Ami Nissho Hoye Jabo (Purno Doirgho Prem Kahini)	Nazmun Munir Nancy – Akash Hote Chai; Kona – Amor Kabbo; Dinat Jahan Munni – O Prio Ami Tomar Hote Chai (Purno Doirgho Prem Kahini); Porshi – Porshi-3

=== Critics Choice Awards – 2013 ===
Best Film	Best Film Director
Faridur Reza Sagar (Impress Telefilm Limited) – Mrittika Maya	Mohammad Hannan – Shikhandi Kotha
Best Film Actor	Best Film Actress
Raisul Islam Asad – Mrittika Maya and Rakhal Sobuj – Shikhandi Kotha (tie)	Naznin Hasan Chumki – Ekoi Britte
Best Playwright	Best TV Director
Pantho Shahriar – Jong Kutumbpur; Wahid Anam – Pari; Mostofa Sarwar Farooki – Puraghotito Bortoman	Wahid Anam – Pari; Hritu – Shimana Periye; Faruk Mithu – Sei Rokom Cha-khor
Best TV Actor	Best TV Actress
Mosharraf Karim – Sei Rokom Cha-khor; Iresh Zaker – Duto Britto Pashapashi; Shahiduzzaman Selim – Jong Kutumbpur	Farjana Chhobi – Shimana Periye; Aupee Karim – Puraghotito Bortoman; Nusrat Imroz Tisha – Duto Britto Pashapashi

== Host and jury board ==
Jewel Aich was the main anchor of Meril Prothom Alo Awards 2014 and his helping hands were Shaju Khadem & Jannatul Ferdoush Peya. Jury Board for Critic's Choice Awards for best director, best actor and best actress were Anupam Hayat, Rokeya Prachy, Nadir Junaid and presided by film director Shahidul Islam Khokon and Critics Choice Awards for best director, best cinematography, best actor and best actress were Salauddin Lavlu, Tarana Halim, Ishrafil Shahin and presided by TV personality Ramendu Majumdar.

== Presenters and performers ==
=== Presenters ===
Presenter(s)	Role
Sharmili Ahmed	Presented Critics' Choice Award for Best Film Actress
Imrul Kayes & Tarana Halim	Presented Critics' Award for Best TV Director
Hasibul Hossain Shanto & Mita Chowdhury	Presented Critics' Choice Award for Best Playwright
Javed Omar Belim & Rumana Rashid Ishita	Presented Critics' Choice Award for Best TV Actress
Bipasha Hayat & Nasir Hossain	Presented Critics' Choice Award for Best TV Actor
Subir Nandi & Jahanara	Presented Public Choice Award for Best Singer (Female)
Abida Sultana & Enamul Haque Jr.	Presented Public Choice Award for Best Singer (Male)
Parveen Sultana Diti & Aminul Haques	Presented Public Choice Award for Best Film Actress
Misha Sawdagor & Lata Mondol	Presented Public Choice Award for Best Film Actor

=== Performers ===
Performer(s)	Performance on
Riaz, Ferdous Ahmed, Apu Biswas and others	Dance on the songs of Razzak's movie
Joler Gaan and Shadhona & her troupe	sang and dance on Bristhi pore Tapur Topur
Apurba, Moushumi Hamid, Emon, Mehzabaein, Nisho and Shayna	Dance performance
Momtaheena Toya, Shamima Tushti, and Shirin Bokul	Meri Lala Peheli Rashni Award
Shahidul Alam Sachchu, Mukit Jakaria, Majnun Mijan, Shirin Bokul, Shamima Tushti	Dance on Hindi Parody Song
Aminul Haque-Nasir Hossain, Matiur Rahman-Faridur Reza Sagar and Anisul Haque-Chowdhury Zafarullah Sharafat	Game
Pantho Kanai, Dilshad Nahar Kona, Puja, Elita and Johan	Sang Char Chokka Hoi Hoi
Shaju Khadem & Jannatul Ferdoush Peya	Dance on Chakdum Chakdum Chandni Raate

== See also ==
- National Film Award
- Ifad Film Club Award
- Babisas Award
