= Farhana Mili =

Bangladeshi film and television actress

- ফারহানা মিলি
- Occupation: Actress

Farhana Mili is a Bangladeshi film and television actress.

== Career ==
Mili's acting career started with the drama serial Jhut Jhamela. She debuted her film career as a lead actress in Monpura (2009).

== Personal life ==
Mili is married to an engineer Rashidul Islam since 2011. Together they have a son (b. 2012).

== Works ==
Filmography

- Monpura (2009)

Television

- Jhut Jhamela
- Shokha Hey
- Shobuj Nokkhotro (2010)
- Vagabond (2015)
- Pagla Hawar Din (2015)
- Meghey Dhaka Akash (2015)
- Ghunpoka (2016)
- Badol Borishone (2016)
- Bakshobondi (2016)
- Dohon (2016)
- Shunno Theke Shuru (2016)
- Shongshoy (2016)
- Happy Family (2017)
- Majnu Ekjon Pagol Nohe (2018)
