= 17th Meril-Prothom Alo Awards =

2015 Bangladeshi TV and film awards

17th Meril Prothom Alo Awards
- Date: 8 May 2015
- Site: Hall of Fame Theatre, Bangabandhu International Conference Center, Dhaka, Bangladesh
- Hosted by: Mosharraf Karim, Nusrat Imroz Tisha, Shaju Khadem
- Preshow hosts: Jannatul Ferdoush Peya
- Produced by: Transcom Group, Square Toiletries

Highlights
- Best Film: Brihonnola
- Best Actor: Shakib Khan; Hero: The Superstar
- Best Actress: Mahiya Mahi; Agnee
- Lifetime achievement: Fahmida Khatun
- Most awards: Brihonnola
- Most nominations: Brihonnola

Television coverage
- Channel: ATN Bangla
- Duration: 1 hours, 29 minutes

The 17th Meril Prothom Alo Awards ceremony, presented by Prothom Alo, took place on 8 May 2015 at the Bangabandhu International Conference Center in Dhaka, Bangladesh, as a part of the 2014–15 film awards season.

== Facts and figures ==
This was the 17th award ceremony of the Meril Prothom Alo Awards. The presence of the poet Rabindranath Tagore was reflected everywhere in the show. Prominent Tagore exponents, including Rezwana Choudhury Bannya, Chandana Mazumder, Papiya Sarwar, Lily Islam, Aditi Mohsin, Sharmin Shathi Islam, Topon Mahmud, Sadi Muhammad, Kiran Chandra Roy, Fahim Hossain Chowdhury, Bulbul Islam, and Khairul Anam Shakil, started off the show with the Tagore song 'Anondoloke, Mongolaloke'. "Matiur Rahman will give a 154-page speech as it is the 154th birth anniversary of the great poet," the associate editor of Prothom Alo, Anisul Hoque, jokingly said while inviting the Prothom Alo editor to the podium in the beginning of the grandiose evening. In his speech, editor Matiur Rahman said Rabindranath Tagore always felt the necessity of publishing a neutral newspaper. 'Prothom Alo', the title has been taken from a Tagore song. Anjan Chowdhury, managing director of Square Toiletries, said the award ceremony is to honour those artists who work tirelessly.

This year a new award named Best newcomer (Film and TV) was introduced, and model and actress Tanjin Tisha secured the award. Brihonnola and Taarkata were nominated for three awards, where the first one secured two awards and the latter secured one. Mostofa Sarwar Farooki received the best film director award for Pipra Bidya for the second time after Third Person Singular Number in 2009. Shakib Khan secured his sixth award for Public Choice best film actor and this was fifth in a row from 2010. This was also fourth and Hat-trick award in a row from 2012 for his wife Nusrat Imroz Tisha in Public Choice best TV actress category for Bijli. Nazmun Munira Nancy got the awards in best female singer category again and that was a double hat-trick for her since 2009.

== Nominees and winners ==
A total of 18 awards were given at the ceremony. Following is the list of the winners.

=== Lifetime Achievement Award – 2015 ===
- Fahmida Khatun

=== Public Choice Awards – 2014 ===
Best Film Actor	Best Film Actress
Shakib Khan – Hero: The Superstar; Ananta Jalil – Most Welcome 2; Arifin Shuvoo – Agnee; Ferdous Ahmed – Brihonnola	Mahiya Mahi – Agnee; Moushumi – Ek Cup Cha; Bidya Sinha Saha Mim – Taarkata; Apu Biswas – Daring Lover
Best TV Actor	Best TV Actress
Mosharraf Karim – Shei Rokom Pan-khor; Chanchal Chowdhury – Lal Kham Bonam Neel Kham; Zahid Hasan – Forman-in; Tahsan – Kothabondhu Mithila	Nusrat Imroz Tisha – Bijlee; Bidya Sinha Saha Mim – November Rain; Agnila – Lal Kham Bonam Neel Kham; Farhana Mili – Bhalobasar Dwitio Golpo
Best Singer (Male)	Best Singer (Female)
James – Desha Asche (Desha: The Leader); Imran- Hridoyer Patay; Tahsan – Uddessho Nei; Bappa Mazumder – Janina Kon Montore	Nazmun Munira Nancy – Bhalo Na Bashle (Onnorokom Bhalobasha); Dilshad Nahar Kona – Taarkata; Jhilik – Prothom Prem; Dola – Tumi Chara
Best Newcomer (Film and TV)
Tanjin Tisha – U-turn; Noor Imran Mithu – Pipra Bidya; Misti Jannat – Love Station; Shirin Shila – Hitman; Sabila Noor – U-turn

=== Critics Choice Awards – 2014 ===
Best Film	Best Film Director
Film Hawker & ATN Bangla – Brihonnola; Faridur Reza Sagar (Impress Telefilm Limited) – Pipra Bidya; Work of Hands and Bengal Entertainment – Meghmallar	Mostofa Sarwar Farooki – Pipra Bidya; Murad Parvez – Brihonnola; Muhammad Mostafa Kamal Raj – Taarkata
Best Film Actor	Best Film Actress
Arifin Shuvoo – Taarkata; Azad Abul Kalam – Brihonnola; Noor Imran Mithu – Pipra Bidya	Moushumi – Ek Cup Cha; Mahiya Mahi – Agnee; Sohana Saba – Brihonnola
Best Playwright	Best TV Director
Monirul Islam Rubel – Protindin Shonibar	Amitabh Reza Chowdhury – Surface; Muhammad Mostafa Kamal Raj – Lal Kham Bonam Neel Kham; Sumon Anwar – Ratargool
Best TV Actor	Best TV Actress
Rownok Hasan – Ratargool; Mamunur Rashid – Ratargool; Chanchal Chowdhury – Lal Kham Bonam Neel Kham	Sanjida Prity – Surface; Zakia Bari Momo – Okkhoy Companyr Juto; Agnila – Lal Kham Bonam Neel Kham

=== Special Critics Awards – 2014 ===
Name of Awards	Winner(s)	Film/Drama
Best Makeup artiste	Mohammad Faruq	Brihonnola
Best TV Director	Wahid Anam	Chihnno

== Host and jury board ==
The show was anchored by popular film and TV artists Mosharraf Karim, Nusrat Imroz Tisha, and Shaju Khadem. The members of the jury board for television critics were Rokeya Rafiq Baby, Zahidur Rahman Anjan, Giasuddin Selim, Syed Gaosul Alam Shaon, and presided by Keramat Mawla; and the members of the jury board for film critics were Matin Rahman, Shamim Akhtar, Gazi Rakayet, Fahmidul Haque, and presided by Amjad Hossain.

== Presenters and performers ==
=== Presenters ===
Presenter(s)	Role
Keramat Mawla & Wahida Mollick Jolly	Presented Critics' Choice Award for Best TV Director
Dilara Zaman & Sirajul Islam	Presented Critics' Choice Award for Best Playwright
Farooque & Sarah Begum Kobori	Presented Critics' Choice Award for Best Film Director
Amjad Hossain & Papiya Sarwar	Presented Critics' Award for Film
Rokeya Rafiq Baby	Presented Special Critics' Award for Best TV Director
Lucky Enam & Salauddin Lavlu	Presented Critics' Choice Award for Best TV Actress
Al Mansur & Shampa Reza	Presented Critics' Choice Award for Best TV Actor
Raisul Islam Asad & Rumana Rashid Ishita	Presented Award for Best Film Actress
Ilias Kanchan & Tarana Halim	Presented Critics' Choice Award for Best Film Actress
Kaniz Almas Khan	Presented Special Critics' Choice Award for Film
Nayeem & Shabnaz	Presented Public Choice Award for Best Newcomer (Film & Television)
Fatema Tuz Zohora & Kumar Bishwajit	Presented Public Choice Award for Best Singer (Female)
Samina Chowdhury & Shafi Mondol	Presented Public Choice Award for Best Singer (Male)
Shanta Islam & Matin Rahman	Presented Public Choice Award for Best TV Actress
Gazi Rakaet & Bijori Barkatullah	Presented Critics' Choice Award for Best TV Actor
Shibli Muhammad & Shamim Ara Nipa	Presented Public Choice Award for Best Film Actor
Rahmat Ali & Rokeya Prachy	Presented Public Choice Award for Best Film Actor

=== Performers ===
Performer(s)	Performance on
Shuvoo-Momo and Tahsan-Mehazabien	Dance on Chuye Dile Mon
Ananta Jalil Afiea Nusrat Barsha, Mosharraf Karim, Chanchal Chowdhury, Khaleda Akter Kolpon	Digital Package Film – Duti Mon Ekti Kotha
Mashrafee Mortuza & Taskin Ahmed	
James	sang Dosh Mash Dosh Din
Emon-Nipun, Symon-Peya Bipasha, Milon-Mahi	Dance on Combo of Tumi Je Amar Kobita, Tumi Amar Jibon, Eikhane Dujone

== See also ==
- Bachsas Awards
- Babisas Award
