= 19th Meril-Prothom Alo Awards =

2017 Bangladeshi TV and film awards

19th Meril Prothom Alo Awards
- Date: 21 April 2017
- Site: Hall of Fame Theatre, Bangabandhu International Conference Center, Dhaka, Bangladesh
- Hosted by: Ferdous Ahmed & Purnima
- Produced by: Transcom Group, Square Toiletries

Highlights
- Best Film: Oggatonama
- Best Actor: Shakib Khan; Shikari
- Best Actress: Masuma Rahman Nabila; Aynabaji
- Lifetime achievement: Syed Hasan Imam

Television coverage
- Channel: Maasranga Television
- Duration: 1 hours, 29 minutes

The 19th Meril Prothom Alo Awards ceremony, presented by Prothom Alo, took place on 21 April 2017 at the Bangabandhu International Conference Center in Dhaka, Bangladesh, as a part of the 2016 film awards season.

== Facts and figures ==
Amitabh Reza Chowdhury received the best film director award for Aynabaji. Shakib Khan secured his eighth award for Public Choice best film actor, and this was his fifth in a row. Nusrat Imroz Tisha won in the Public Choice best TV actress category for Ekti Taalgachher Golpo. Dilshad Nahar Kona got the awards in the best female singer category again, and that was a double hat-trick for her since 2009.

== Nominees and winners ==
A total of 16 awards were given at the ceremony. Following is the list of the winners.

=== Lifetime Achievement Award – 2016 ===
- Syed Hasan Imam

=== Public Choice Awards – 2016 ===
Best Film Actor	Best Film Actress
Shakib Khan – Shikari	Nabila – Aynabaji
Best TV Actor	Best TV Actress
Mosharraf Karim – Bougiri	Nusrat Imroz Tisha – Ekti Taalgachher Golpo
Best Singer (Male)	Best Singer (Female)
Imran – for Bossgiri film's 'Dil dil dil'	Kona – for Bossgiri film's 'Dil dil dil'
Best Newcomer (Film and TV)
Shobnom Bubly – Bossgiri	

=== Critics Choice Awards – 2016 ===
Best Film	Best Film Director
Oggatonama	Amitabh Reza Chowdhury – Aynabaji
Best Film Actor	Best Film Actress
Chanchal Chowdhury – Aynabaji	Sajhbati – Shankhachil
Best Playwright	Best TV Director
Sarwar Reza Jimmy – Jog Biyog	Sagar Jahan – Madhobilata Groho Ar Na
Best TV Actor	Best TV Actress
Afran Nisho – Jog Biyog	Aupee Karim – Madhobilata Groho Ar Na

== See also ==
- Bachsas Awards
- Babisas Award
