= 14th Meril-Prothom Alo Awards =

2012 Bangladeshi TV and film awards

14th Meril Prothom Alo Awards
- Date: 26 April 2012
- Site: Hall of Fame Theatre, Bangabandhu International Conference Center, Dhaka, Bangladesh
- Hosted by: Chanchal Chowdhury, Nusrat Imrose Tisha & Mosharraf Karim
- Preshow hosts: Munmun
- Produced by: Transcom Group, Square Toiletries
- Directed by: Gazi Shuvro

Highlights
- Best Picture: Guerilla
- Most awards: Guerilla (4)
- Most nominations: Guerilla

Television coverage
- Network: Maasranga Television
- Duration: 87 minutes

The 14th Meril Prothom Alo Awards ceremony, presented by Prothom Alo took place on 26 April 2012, at the Bangabandhu International Conference Center in Dhaka, Bangladesh as a part of 2011–12 film awards season. The evening started off with Anisul Haque taking the podium, greeting those present. He was followed by the editor of Prothom Alo Matiur Rahman.

== Facts and figures ==
This was 14th award ceremony of Meril Prothom Alo Awards. Guerrilla won best film awards as well as awards for Critics Choice best film director, film actress and special critics awards. Shakib Khan won the awards of his fourth time for best film actor for King Khan. Shonibar Raat Doshta Chollish Minute-e won two awards for Critics Choice best playwright and best TV actor.

== Winners and nominations ==
15 personalities were handed out awards for various categories, selected by the readers of Prothom Alo and the Critics Award at the ceremony. Following is the list of the winners.

=== Lifetime Achievement Award – 2012 ===
- Renowned artist Mustafa Manwar

=== Public Choice Awards – 2011 ===
Best Film Actor	Best Film Actress
Shakib Khan – King Khan; Zahid Hasan – Projapoti; Ferdous Ahmed – Guerrilla; Mosharraf Karim – Projapoti	Moushumi – Projapoti; Apu Biswas; Joya Ahsan – Guerrilla; Purnima – Mayer Jonno Pagol
Best TV Actor	Best TV Actress
Mosharraf Karim – Chander Nijosso Kono Aalo Nei; Mahfuz Ahmed – Choita Pagol; Chanchal Chowdhury – Olospur; Zahid Hasan – Poush Phaguner Mela	Joya Ahsan – Choita Pagol; Nusrat Imroz Tisha – Chander Nijosso Kono Aalo Nei; Bidya Sinha Saha Mim – Olospur; Sumaiya Shimu – Lolita
Best Singer (Male)	Best Singer (Female)
Arfin Rumey – Nilanjona; S.I. Tutul – Din Duniyar Malik; Habib Wahid – Ahban; Hridoy Khan – Chhoa	Nazmun Munir Nancy – Pagol Tor Jonno; Dilshad Nahar Kona – Simply Kona; Kazi Krishnokoli Islam – Alor Pithe Adhar; Sabrina Porshi – Nilanjona

=== Critics' Choice Awards – 2011 ===
Best Film	Best Film Director
Faridur Reza Sagar (Impress Telefilm Limited) & Esha Yusuff – Guerilla; Faridur Reza Sagar (Impress Telefilm Limited) – Amar Bondhu Rashed	Nasiruddin Yousuff – Guerilla; Morshedul Islam – Amar Bondhu Rashed; Shah Alam Kiron – Matir Thikana
Best Film Actor	Best Film Actress
Chowdhury Jawata Afnan – Amar Bondhu Rashed; Alamgir – Matir Thikana; Shakib Khan – Adorer Jamai	Joya Ahsan – Guerilla; Moushumi – Projapoti; Nipun Akter – Adorer Jamai
Best Playwright	Best TV Director
Mostafa Monwar – Holud; Ashraful Chanchal – Shonibar Raat Doshta Chollish Minute; Alvee Ahmed – Tahminar Dinjapon	Ashraful Chanchal – Shonibar Raat Doshta Chollish Minute-e; Animesh Aich – Holud; Alvee Ahmed – Tahminar Dinjapon
Best TV Actor	Best TV Actress
Abul Hayat – Shonibar Raat Doshta Chollish Minute-e; A.K.M. Hasan – A Journey By Politics; Alan Shuvro – Holud	Nusrat Imroz Tisha – Tahminar Dinjapon; Joya Ahsan – Koyekti Neel Ronger Pencil; Shoshi – Necklace

=== Special Award – 2011 ===
- A.T.M. Shamsuzzaman – Guerilla

== Host and Jury Board ==
The event was hosted by Chanchal Chowdhury, Nusrat Imroz Tisha, and Mosharraf Karim. The member of Jury Board for Television section were Mita Chowdhury, Abu Sayeed, Giasuddin Selim, Moushumi and presided by Syed Monjurul Islam; and for the film section were Shahidul Islam Khokon, Ilias Kanchan, Jakir Hossain Razu, Rokeya Prachy, Kaberi Gayen and presided by Syed Salauddin Jaki.

== Presenters and performances ==
=== Presenters ===
Presenter	Role
Anisuzzaman, Motiur Rahman, M. Ashikul Islam	Presented Lifetime Achievement Award
Mahmuduzzaman Babu & Rokeya Prachy	Presented Critics' Choice Award for Best Playwright
Tauquir Ahmed & Bipasha Hayat	Presented Critics' Choice Award for Best TV Director
Asaduzzaman Noor & Mita Chowdhury	Presented Critics' Choice Award for Best TV Actress
Aly Zaker & Sara Zaker	Presented Critics' Choice Award for Best TV Actor
Khalil Ullah Khan & Afroza Banu	Presented Special Critics' Award for Film
Alamgir & Runa Laila	Presented Critics' Choice Award for Best Film
Nayok Raj Razzak & Kobori	Presented Critics' Choice Award for Best Film Director
Mahmud Koli & Parveen Sultana Diti	Presented Critics' Choice Award for Best Actress
Ilias Kanchan & Anjana	Presented Critics' Choice Award for Best Actor
Hamin Ahmed & Shafin Ahmed	Presented Public Choice Award for Best Female Singer
Rafiqul Alam & Abida Sultana	Presented Public Choice Award for Best Male Singer
Ilias Jabed & Rozina	Presented Public Choice Award for Best Film Actress
Shibli Muhammad & Shamim Ara Nipa	Presented Public Choice Award for Best Film Actor
Habibul Bashar Sumon & Shabnur	Presented Public Choice Award for Best TV Actress
Ferdous Ahmed, Moushumi & Zahid Hasan	Presented Public Choice Award for Best TV Actor

=== Performances ===
Performer(s)	Performance on
Shibli Muhammad and his troop	A Tribute to Martyrs of Language Movement
Shahed & Nipun, Nirob & Sarika, Emon & Shokh, Arifin Shuvoo & Bidya Sinha Saha Mim	Combo of Sob Sokhire Par Korite, Beder Meye Josna, Porena Chokher Polok, Khairun Lo, Premi o Premi
Shahidul Islam Sachchu, Tusher Khan, Shirin Bakul, Shamima Naznin, Shaju Khadem & others	Political Satire (Why This Maramari)
Ferdous Ahmed & Moushumi	Combo of Eto Bhalobeso Na Amay, Ami Tomar Moner Vitor
Mashrafe Murtaza & Shorna, Mohammad Ashraful & Ishana, Nasir Ahmed & Mashiyat	Acting, Dancing (Aguner Gola & Tunir Maa)
Pollobi Dance Centre	Amra Notun Jouboner Dut

== See also ==
- National Film Awards
- Bachsas Awards
- Babisas Award
