= Aupee Karim =

Bangladeshi actress, model, architect, and dancer

- অপি করিম
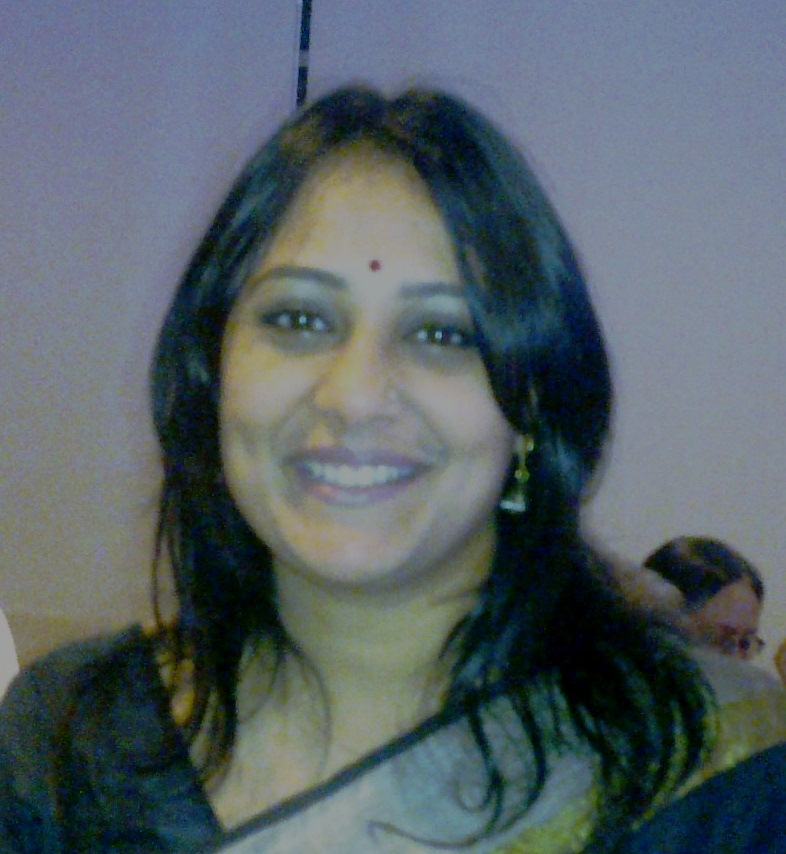
- Aupee in 2016
- Born: Syeda Tuhin Ara Karim; 1 May
- Education: Bangladesh University of Engineering and Technology (B. Arch.); Anhalt University of Applied Sciences (M. Arch.)
- Occupations: Actress, academic, model
- Spouses: Asir Ahmed (m. 2007; div. 2010); Masud Hasan Ujjal (m. 2011; div. 2013); Enamul Karim Nirjhar (m. 2016)
- Children: 1
- Awards: Full list

Signature
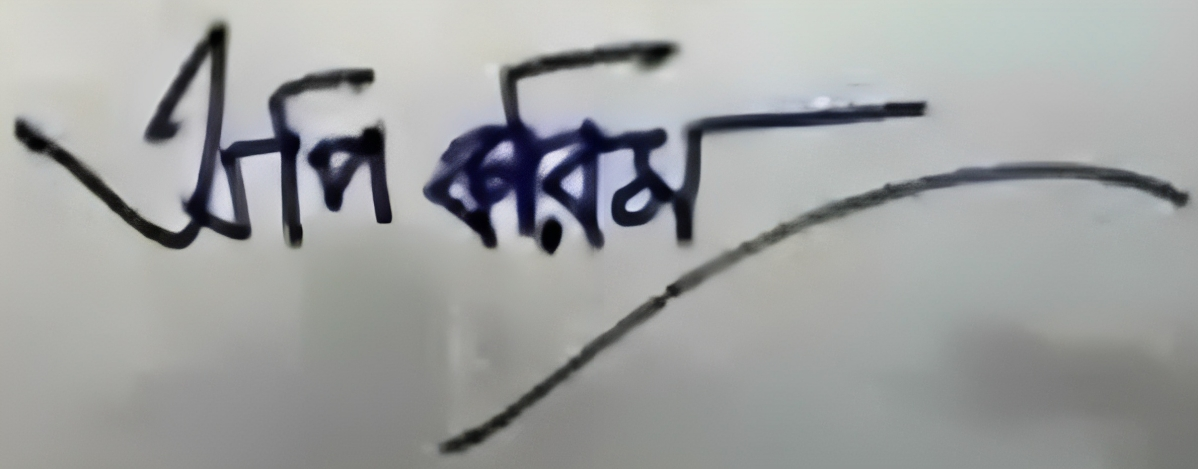

Syeda Tuhin Ara Karim (born 1 May; known by her stage name Aupee Karim) is a Bangladeshi actress, model, architect, and dancer. She won Bangladesh National Film Award for Best Actress for her role in the film Bachelor (2004). She was a faculty member at the School of Architecture of American International University-Bangladesh.

== Background and education ==
Syeda Tuhin Ara Karim was born to Syed Abdul Karim (d. 2021) and Shahan Ara Karim. Syed Abdul was a poet and writer; a lifetime member of Bangla Academy and a translator of children books.

Karim completed her high school studies from BAF Shaheen College Dhaka. Also, she completed her college from Holy Cross College, Dhaka. She earned a bachelor's degree in architecture from Bangladesh University of Engineering and Technology in 2005. Later, she completed her master's from Anhalt University of Applied Sciences in Germany.

== Career ==
Karim began her acting career on television in the late 1990s, making her debut in the 1998 television play Pecchoney Shobuj Gram. Her breakthrough in the entertainment industry came after winning the Lux Photogenic Contest (later named Lux Channel I Superstar) in 1999, which led to widespread recognition and prominent roles in acclaimed television dramas such as Choruibhati, Bhoy, Ongkar, Ekannoborti, and Shukno Phool Rangin Phool. Karim made her feature film debut in Mostofa Sarwar Farooki's 2004 film Bachelor. Her portrayal of Sathi, a young woman navigating modern romance, earned her the Bangladesh National Film Award for Best Actress. Prior to her formal acting career, she had a minor appearance as young Runu in the 1992 family drama Shonkhonil Karagar, based on a novel of Humayun Ahmed.

Karim acted in the film Mayar Jonjal (2023), directed by Indranil Roychowdhury. This India-Bangladeshh joint venture production film was based on Manik Bandopadhyay's two short stories, titled Bishakto Prem and Shubala. The film was selected for the 23rd Shanghai International Film Festival and the 42nd Moscow International Film Festival (MIFF).

Karim worked as an assistant professor of the School of Architecture at American International University-Bangladesh (AIUB).

Karim appeared as a judge on the reality television show Lux-Channel i Superstar throughout 2014. In addition to her work in film and television, Karim is a trained Kathak dancer, has performed in stage productions including a 2018 revival of Dear Liar, and has hosted several television programs such as Aupee's Glowing Chair and Amar Ami.

Karim was a jury member of 24th Dhaka International Film Festival held in January 2026.

== Personal life ==
Karim first married Asir Ahmed in 2007, then an associate professor of computer science and communications engineering at Kyushu University, Japan and also a project manager of Grameen Communication's Global Communication Centre. After the divorce, she married Masud Hasan Ujjal, a television producer, on 2 September 2011. Karim first worked under the direction of Ujjal in the 2007 television play Chhayaferi. The second marriage ended in May 2013. She then married film producer and architect Enamul Karim Nirjhar in 2016. With Nirjhar, Karim has a daughter, Rashmi Ruaida Karim (aged 5).

== Works ==
=== Films ===
Year	Title	Role	Notes	Ref.
2004	Bachelor	Sathi		
2023	Mayar Jonjal	Soma	Indo-Bangladesh joint production film	
2025	Utshob			

=== Television Program ===
Year	Title	Role	Channel
	Jibon Jatra	Host	BTV
	Amar Ami	Host	Bangla Vision
	Sonali Prantore	Host	Bangla Vision
2013	Amader Jadughor	Host	Bangla Vision
2014	Aupee's Glowing Chair (season 1)	Host	Channel Nine
2015	Aupee's Glowing Chair (season 2)	Host	Channel Nine

== Awards ==
National Film Awards

- Best Actress – Bachelor (2004)

Meril Prothom Alo Awards

Year	Category	Film/Drama	Result
2003	Public Choice Best TV Actress		Won
2005	Public Choice Best TV Actress		Won
2007	Critics Choice Best TV Actress	Nusrat, Songe Ekti Golpo	Won
