= Kazi Riton =

Bangladeshi actor and filmmaker (born 1977)

- কাজী রিটন
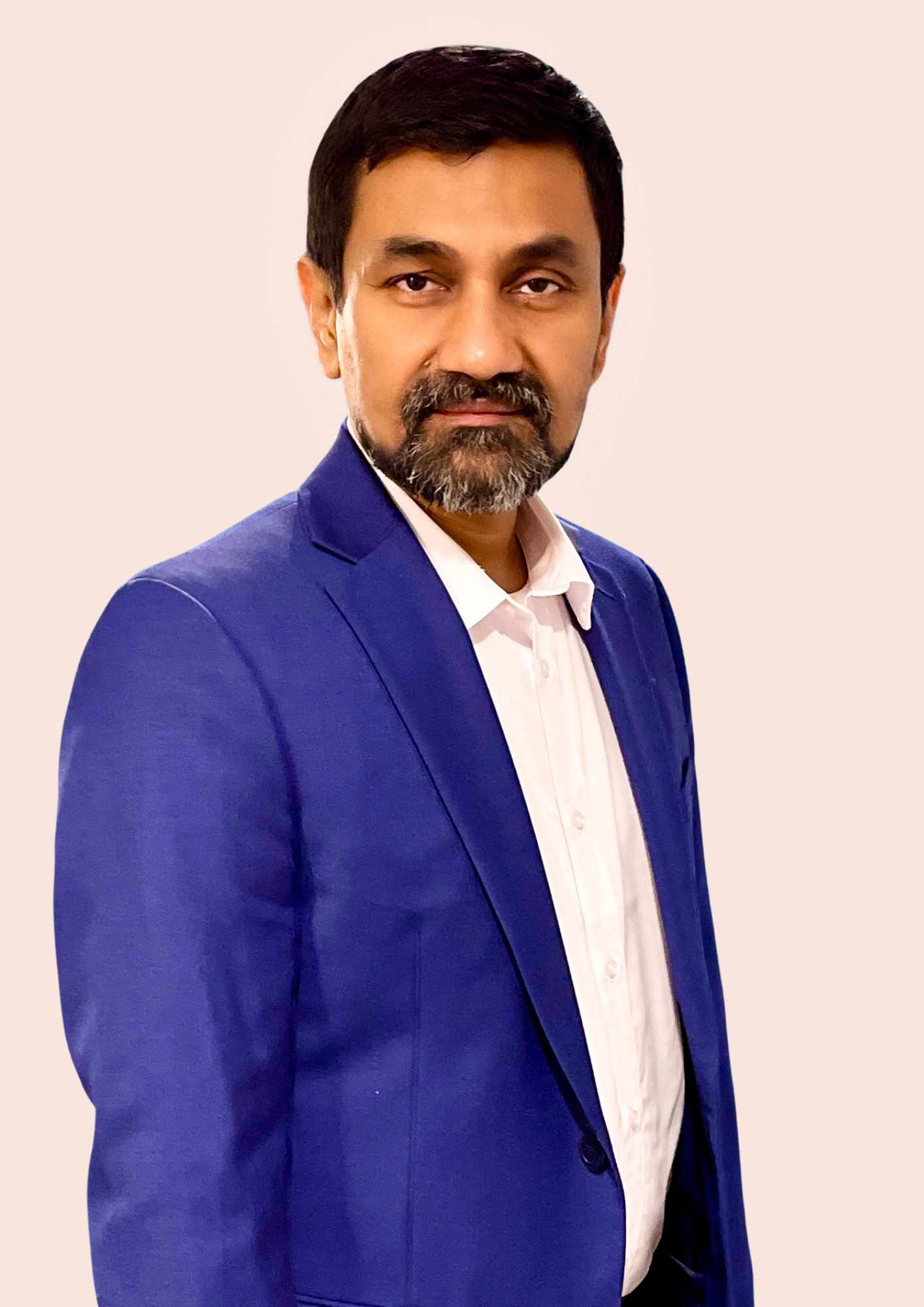
- Born: Kazi Abu Bakar Siddiky; January 17, 1977 (age 49); Natore, Bangladesh
- Occupations: Producer, actor, writer, director
- Years active: 2000-present
- Spouse: Mumtaz Alia Akbari
- Awards: CJFB Performance Award for Best Television Drama (2020)

Kazi Abu Bakar Siddiky, known as Kazi Riton (Bengali: কাজী আবু বকর সিদ্দিকী; born 17 January 1977) is a Bangladeshi producer, actor, writer and director. He is the owner of film and television production company Black & White. He was the International Affairs Secretary of Television Program Producers Association of Bangladesh (2019-2021). Currently, he is serving as an Executive Member of Television & Digital Program Producers Association of Bangladesh.

== Early life ==
Kazi Riton was born on 17 January 1977 in Natore, Bangladesh. His father is Kazi Abdur Rashid and mother is Salina Banu.

== Career ==
Kazi Riton arrived in Dhaka in 1998. Early in his career he played in theater and worked as an assistant director in TV media. Then he started working in the film and TV media sector of Bangladesh regularly since 2000. He has performed in several drama serials & TV Movies, including 'Dour' (2004), on BTV (Bangladesh Television, the state-owned National Television network), 'Binocular' (2005) on NTV, 'Groho Konna' (2006) on NTV, 'Bachelor Dompoti' (2007) on BanglaVision and 'A Team' (2013) on Channel i, written by Masud Sezan and directed by Tania Ahmed. Besides these, he has appeared as a model in several commercials like AKTEL (mobile network operator), Jamuna Bank, Bangladesh Biman Airlines etc. Kazi Riton made his film debut in 'Chandragrohon' in 2008, directed by Bangladesh National Film Award-winning director Murad Parvez. The film won Bangladesh National Film Award and other awards.

== Producer ==
Besides acting, Riton started business in media sector as one of the partners of '5.Com', where other partners were famous actresses Bijori Barkatullah and Ipshita Shabnam Srabonti, popular singer and actor Partha Barua. Critically acclaimed drama serial Ditiyo Jibon (2003) which ran successfully on ATN Bangla, written by Anisul Hoque and directed by S.A. Haque Olike, was one of the major productions of '5.com'. He worked as executive producer and producer in film and TV media.

He is the Associate Producer of the financially successful film Hridoyer Kotha (2006), starring National Award-winning actors Riaz and Purnima.

== Filmography ==
=== Films ===
Year	Title	Director	Credited as	Notes / Ref.
2006	Hridoyer Kotha	S A Haque Olike	Associate producer	Feature Film
2007	Didha	Kazi Riton	Writer, director, Producer	Short Film
2008	Chandragrohon	Murad Parvez	Actor	Feature Film
2009	Ontorikkho	Kazi Riton	Writer, director, Producer	Short Film
2020	Phera	Oasiuddin Ahmed	Producer	Short Film

=== Television ===
Year	Title	TV Channel	Director	Credited as	Notes / Ref.
2002	Naikar Name Naam	BTV	Khalid Mahmed Shezan	Executive producer	TV series
2003	Ditiyo Jibon	ATN Bangla	S A Haque Olike	Executive producer	TV series
2004	Abong Biya	ETV	Saiful Islam Mannu	Executive producer	TV series
2004	Dour	BTV	Murad Parvez	Actor	TV series
2005	Society	Channel One	Ashraful Alam Ripon	Executive producer	TV series
2005	Moyur Bahon	Channel One	Rulin Rahman	Executive producer	TV series
2005	Khwab	ATN Bangla	S A Haque Olike	Executive producer	TV series
2005	Groho Konna	NTV	Murad Parvez	Actor	TV series
2006	Dristi Dan	ATN Bangla	S A Haque Olike	Co-producer	TV movie
2006	Shuvo	RTV	Ashraful Alam Ripon	Co-producer	TV movie
2006	Valobasha Mondobasha	NTV	S A Haque Olike	Executive producer	TV series
2007	Biborno Valobasha	NTV	Murad Parvez	Executive producer	TV series
2007	Dahan	RTV	Ferdous Hassan	Executive producer	TV series
2007	Bachelor Dompoti	Bangla Vision	Murad Parvez	Co-producer	TV series
2008	Kasha Dura	Bangla Vision	Taher Shipon	Co-producer	TV series
2008	Neera Nirbashon	BTV	Idris Haider	Producer	TV series
2008-2009	Monorama Arrogo Nikatan	Channel i	Shahjada Mamun	Co-producer	TV series
2008-2009	Aim in Life	NTV	Masud Sezan	Producer	TV series
2009	Ottri	Desh TV	Shibu Kumer Shill	Co-producer	TV movie
2009	Manush Mohajon	Digonto TV	Arun Chowdhuri	Producer	TV series
2009	Marathon	Bangla Vision	Shafayet Mansoor	Producer	TV special
2009	Dur Desh	Channel i	Kaisar Ahmed	Producer	TV series
2009-2010	Patigonit	Bangla Vision	Masud Sezan	Producer	TV series
2009-2010	Koekti Kata Ghori	Channel i	Sotirtho Rahman	Producer	TV series
2010	Shesher Ratri	Channel i	Chayanika Chowdhury	Producer	TV special
2010	Prottagoto	BTV	Taher Shipon	Producer	TV movie
2010	Kagozer Ghor	ATN Bangla	Chayanika Chowdhury	Producer	TV series
2010	5th Gear	Bangla Vision	Shafayet Mansoor	Producer	TV special
2010	Tahara	BTV	Rulin Rahman	Producer	TV series
2010	Ashare Golpo	NTV	Sazzad Sumon	Producer	TV series
2010-2011	Ural Ponkhi Mon	Channel i	Shahjada Mamun	Producer	TV series
2011	Ekti Kalo Britta	Channel i	Chayanika Chowdhury	Executive producer	TV movie
2011	Jhora Ful	ATN Bangla	M R Mizan	Executive producer	TV series
2011	Run	RTV	M R Mizan	Producer	TV series
2011	Boishak theke Srabon	NTV	Chayanika Chowdhury	Producer	TV series
2012	Golmal	BTV	Pasha	Producer	TV series
2012	Bidhu babur Hashpatal	BTV	Shibli Kayum	Producer	TV series
2012	Aparanher Alo	Maasranga TV	Parvez Amin	Producer	TV movie
2012	Permonisha	RTV	Sushmoy Sumon	Producer	TV movie
2013	Chutir dine	Channel i	Golam Sohrab Dodul	Producer	TV series
2013	A Team	Channel i	Tania Ahmed	Producer, Actor	TV series
2013	Khun O Otopor	Boishakhi TV	Khan Mohammed Badruddin	Executive producer	TV series
2014	Dhulu Bali	Desh TV	Chayanika Chowdhury	Producer	TV movie
2014	Vagabond	RTV	Rayhan Khan	Executive producer	TV series
2014	Voy	Desh TV	Animesh Aich	Producer	TV special
2015	Maya Thaka Scotland a	BTV	Pasha	Producer	TV series
2015	Prem Noy Valobasha	Maasranga TV	Shahjada Mamun	Producer	TV movie
2015	Jonoyko Jahid Hassan	RTV	Sushmoy Sumon	Producer	TV movie
2015-2016	Ferari	Channel i	Ashim Gomez	Producer	TV series
2016	Alor Khoja Kajona	ETV	Sotirtho Rahman	Producer	TV series
2016	Restaurant 21	Desh TV	Murad Parvez	Producer	TV series
2016	Annopokho	SA TV	Shahjada Mamun	Producer	TV movie
2016	Vitor Bahir	Channel i	Shahjada Mamun	Producer	TV series
2016	Konna Rupoboti	Channel i	Shahjada Mamun	Producer	TV series
2017	Suronjana	RTV	Chayanika Chowdhury	Producer	TV movie
2017	Triteo Pokho	Desh TV	Shahjada Mamun	Executive producer	TV movie
2018	Onur Projapoti	NTV	Parvez Amin	Producer	TV movie
2018	Baba Asben	NTV	Habib Shakil	Producer	TV special
2018	Sign In	SA TV	Chayanika Chowdhury	Producer	TV movie
2018	Humming Bird	SA TV	Khan Mohammed Badruddin	Executive producer	TV special
2018	Opare Tumi	RTV	Soyed Zamim	Executive producer	TV movie
2018	Osomoyer Britto	SA TV	Chayanika Chowdhury	Producer	TV movie
2018	Science Er Meye Arts Er Chele	ATN Bangla	Habib Shakil	Producer	TV movie
2018	Atopor Tahara	SA TV	Rintu Parvez	Producer	TV movie
2018	Odrisho Deyal	Maasranga TV	Ruman Runi	Producer	TV movie
2018	Ektu Dekha Ektu Choa	SA TV	Chayanika Chowdhury	Producer	TV movie
2019	Fun with Favourites	NEWS 24	Imraul Rafat	Producer	Talk Show
2019	Tom and Jerry	ATN Bangla	Kajal Arefin Ome	Executive producer, Producer	TV movie
2019	Dream of Life	ETV	Rehman Khalil	Executive producer	TV movie
2019	Tom and Jerry 2	Asian TV	Kajal Arefin Ome	Producer	TV movie
2019	Cheletir Maa Chhilona	ATN Bangla	Rintu Parvez	Producer	TV movie
2019	I am Pregnant	Asian TV	Rafat Mozumder Rinku	Producer	TV movie
2019	Bad Man	Asian TV	Kajal Arefin Ome	Producer	TV movie
2019	Oshoriri	Maasranga TV	Shokal Ahmed	Producer	TV movie
2019	Shuvo Dristi	Maasranga TV	K M Naim	Producer	TV special
2019	Opochonder Saat Din	Desh TV	Habib Shakil	Producer	TV special
2019	Net Love	ATN Bangla	Rintu Parvez	Producer	TV movie
2019	Bibaho Sonkot	RTV	Ruman Runi	Executive producer	TV movie
2019	Apa	ETV	Shokal Ahmed	Producer, Writer	TV movie
2020	Aaj o Tumi Ar Aami	Maasranga TV	Shokal Ahmed	Producer	TV special
2020	Golpo Noy	NTV	Chayanika Chowdhury	Producer	TV special
2020	Priyotomo Valobasa	Maasranga TV	Shokal Ahmed	Producer	TV special
2020	Prem Ekattor	Maasranga TV	Shokal Ahmed	Producer	TV movie
2020	Mone Mone	Maasranga TV	Choynika Chowdhury	Producer	TV movie
2020-2021	Porer Meye	NTV	Habib Shakil	Producer	TV series
2021	Chhaya Shikari	Maasranga TV	Morshed Himadri Himu	Producer	TV movie
2021	Unpajure	Maasranga TV	Ruman Runi	Producer	TV movie
2021	Match Winner	NTV	Abu Hayat Mahmud	Producer	TV series
2021	Sot Ma	NTV	Habib Shakil	Writer	TV series
2021	Khochai	Bangla Vision	Shokal Ahmed	Producer	Mini Series
2021	Shohornama	Maasranga TV	Shokal Ahmed	Producer	TV movie
2021-2022	Friend Book	NTV	Goutam Koiri	Producer	TV series
2022	Super Six	Channel i	Imran Hossain Emu	Producer	TV series
2022	Ograhayoner Megh	Gazi TV	Choynika Chowdhury	Producer	TV special
2022	Family Crisis reloaded	ATN Bangla	M M Kamal Raz	Producer	TV series
2022	Asha Boli	NTV	Abu Hayat Mahmud	Producer	TV special
2022	Amar Kerani Baba	NTV	Sraboni Ferdous	Producer	TV special
2022	Feriwala	NTV	Rakesh Basu	Producer	TV special
2022	Jugol	Maasranga TV	Ruman Runi	Producer	TV special
2022	Jajabor	RTV	Khan Mohammed Badruddin	Producer	Web Film
2022	Swati Nokkhotrer Aloy	NTV	Chayanika Chowdhury	Producer	TV special
2022-2023	Pita Bonam Putro Gong	Maasranga Television	Shakal Ahmed	Producer	TV Series
2023	Kajol Rekha	Deepto TV	SM Salah Uddin	Producer	TV Series
2023	Bou Manei Jontrona	RTV	Jamal Mallick	Producer	TV Movie
2024	Obelay	Channel i	Chayanika Chowdhury	Producer	TV Movie
2024	Shrabon Josnai	ATN Bangla	Chayanika Chowdhury	Producer	TV Movie
2024	Bhalobasha Ononto	NTV	Chayanika Chowdhury	Executive Producer	TV Movie
2024	Bisorjone Orjon	Maasranga Television	Chayanika Chowdhury	Executive Producer	TV Movie

== Awards ==
- CJFB Performance Award - 2020
- Babisas Award - 2021
- BABISAS Award - 2019
