= FnF (TV series) =

- Also known as: Friends n Family
- Genre: Drama serial
- Created by: Redoan Rony
- Written by: Redoan Rony
- Directed by: Redoan Rony
- Starring: Abul Hayat; Partha Barua; Aupee Karim; Sumaiya Shimu; Anika Kabir Shokh; Mosharraf Karim; MoMo Morshed; Ishtiak Ahmed Rumel; Ahmed Rubel; Schumonn Patwary; Saju Muntasher; Shahnaz Khushi; Nafisa Chowdhury Nafa; Faruque Ahmed; Anika Akter Nupur; Fida Aeschylus Pidim; Dicon Noor; Nauha Munir Dihan; Shahnaz Khushi
- Country of origin: Bangladesh
- Original language: Bengali
- No. of seasons: 1
- No. of episodes: 78

Production
- Producer: Popcorn Entertainment
- Production locations: Gazipur, Dhaka, Sylhet
- Cinematography: Aditto Monir
- Editor: Kazi Shah Maksud
- Running time: 22 minutes
- Production company: G-Series

Original release
- Network: NTV
- Release: 17 January – 18 July 2010

FnF, also known as Friends n Family, is a Bangladeshi drama serial which was first aired on 17 January 2010 on channel every Sundays and Mondays at 9:40pm on NTV. and as of 18 July 2010, "FnF" stopped airing. Redoan Rony, the writer of the popular Bengali drama serial House Full, is the director and the writer of FnF. The story of this drama serial revolves around Mr. Patwary and children, all living in the urbanised and developing city of Dhaka, along with their loving family and friends. The cast includes Abul Hayat, Partha Barua, Aupee Karim, Sumaiya Shimu, Anika Kabir Shokh, Mosharraf Karim, Rumel, Ahmed Rubel, MoMo Morshed, Schumonn Patwary, Saju Muntasher, Shahnaz Khushi, Nafa, Faruque Ahmed, Anika Akter Nupur, Fida Aeschylus Pidim, and Tania Ahmed.

== Plot ==
Most of the major characters - Mr. Patwary (Abul Hayat), Bobby (Sumaiya Shimu), Chobi (Anika Kabir Shokh), Johir(Mosharraf Karim), Mostak(Ahmed Rubel) etc. get introduced to each other while travelling on a package tour destined for Sylhet. Their intimacy stays even after coming back to Dhaka. They keep running into each other on various occasions and their bonds grow even bigger. Eventually new relations form among them. Also various new characters get involved with their lives from time to time.

== Cast ==
- Abul Hayat as Mr. Patwary
- Partha Barua as Mesbah
- Aupee Karim as Aupee
- Mosharraf Karim as Zohir
- Sumaiya Shimu as Bobby
- Anika Kabir Shokh as Chobi
- Momo Morshed as Akkas
- Ishtiak Ahmed Rumel as Rocket
- Ahmed Rubel as Mostaq
- Schumonn Patwary as Rocket's brother-in-law
- Saju Muntasher as Saju
- Faruque Ahmed as Quddus
- Anika Akter Nupur as Quddus' wife
- Shahnaz Khushi as Quddus' girlfriend
- Fida Aeschylus Pidim as Rohan
- Dicon Noor as Boss
- Nauha Munir Dihan as Rocket's sister
- Nafisa Chowdhury Nafa as Rita
