= Rumana Malik Munmun =

Bangladeshi model, actress, and television anchor

- রুমানা মালিক মুনমুন
- Born: May 14; Sylhet
- Citizenship: Bangladeshi
- Occupations: Model; actress; dancer; anchor
- Years active: 2006–present
- Spouse: Toufique Hasan

Rumana Malik Munmun (Bengali: রুমানা মালিক মুনমুন, born May 14) is a Bangladeshi model, actress, dancer, and television anchor. She first came to prominence as a third runner-up at Lux Channel I Superstar in 2006. Since 2007, Munmun has run the Bangladeshi television reality show Lux Channel I Superstar as a solo host.

== Early life and education ==
Rumana Malik Munmun was born on 14 May. She attended North South University. Munmun is married to Toufique Hasan, a lecturer at North South University.

== Career ==
She learned classical dance from Bulbul Academy for Fine Arts (BAFA) in Dhaka. Before her 2007 film debut in the Daruchini Dip, she appeared in several television commercials. Munmun runs the popular talk show Amar Ami on Bangla Vision.

== Filmography ==
Year	Film	Role	Notes
2007	Daruchini Dip	Muna	
2009	Chana o Muktijuddho		

=== Television ===
As actor

Title	Year	Channel	Note
Dainik Tolpar	2010		
Batasher Khancha			
Dhupchhaya	2010	NTV	
Batpaar	2010	ATN	
Looking Glass	2010	ATN	
Dighir Jole Kar Chaya Go		Channel I	
Bishaash	2011		

As Host

- Spelling Bee
- Chemistry on Maasranga Television (2015)
- Edexcel International GCSE and A Level Examinations in 2015 (2016)
- Shubho Bibaho on Channel I
- Look At Me on Channel I
- Shera Radhuni on Maasranga Television
