= Aim in Life =

- Genre: Dramaserial
- Written by: Masud Sezan
- Directed by: Masud Sezan
- Starring: Mosharraf Karim; Kusum Sikder; Rawnak Hasan; Tisha; Rifat Chowdhury; Challenger; Tinni; Nafisa Jahan; Kochi Khandokar; Saju Muntasher; Nafa; Abdullah Rana; Shirin Alam; Tareq Mahmud; Daud Rony; Ujjal
- Country of origin: Bangladesh
- Original language: Bengali
- No. of episodes: 54

Production
- Executive producer: Kazi Riton
- Producer: Kazi Riton
- Production locations: Dhaka; Gazipur
- Running time: 18 minutes
- Production companies: Black & White

Original release
- Network: NTV
- Release: 14 June 2008 – 15 January 2009

Aim in Life is a Bangladeshi drama serial produced by Kazi Riton, written and directed by Masud Sezan. This drama serial aired on NTV, and was first aired on June 14, 2008 and last aired on January 15, 2009. The story revolves around the city dwellers of Dhaka, and how everyone manages to lead their lives, disregarding their status. This dramaserial stars Mosharraf Karim, Kusum Sikder, Rawnak Hasan, Tisha, Rifat Chowdhury, Challenger, Tinni, Nafisa Jahan, Kochi Khandokar, Saju Muntasher, Nafa, Abdullah Rana, Shirin Alam, Tareq Mahmud, Daud Rony and Ujjal. There are also cameo appearances from the former captain of Bangladesh National Cricket Team, Khaled Mashud, singer S I Tutul and Magician Jewel Aich.

== Plot ==
The story revolves around a retired government officer, his family, his house, and also the tenants of the house. who slowly starts to realise that he has a lot on his hand after his retirement to write a book titled "Aim in Life." Irritated by the actions of his own offspring, he comes to the realisation that it's a must for every individual to have an aim in life. He wants to explain this in his book. Looking for material for his book, he starts fieldwork by interviewing people. Interviewees includes even beggars, whether they have an aim or not.

== Characters ==
- Mosharraf Karim
- Kusum Sikder
- Challenger
- Raunak Hasan
- Tisha
- Rifat Chowdhury
- Nafisa Jahan - Shumi
- Kochi Khandokar
- Saju Muntasher
- Nafa
- Abdullah Rana
- Shirin Alam
- Tareq Mahmud
- Daud Rony
- Ujjal
- deepanshu teotia jaat
