= Nawsheen Nahreen Mou =

Bangladeshi television actress

- নওশীন
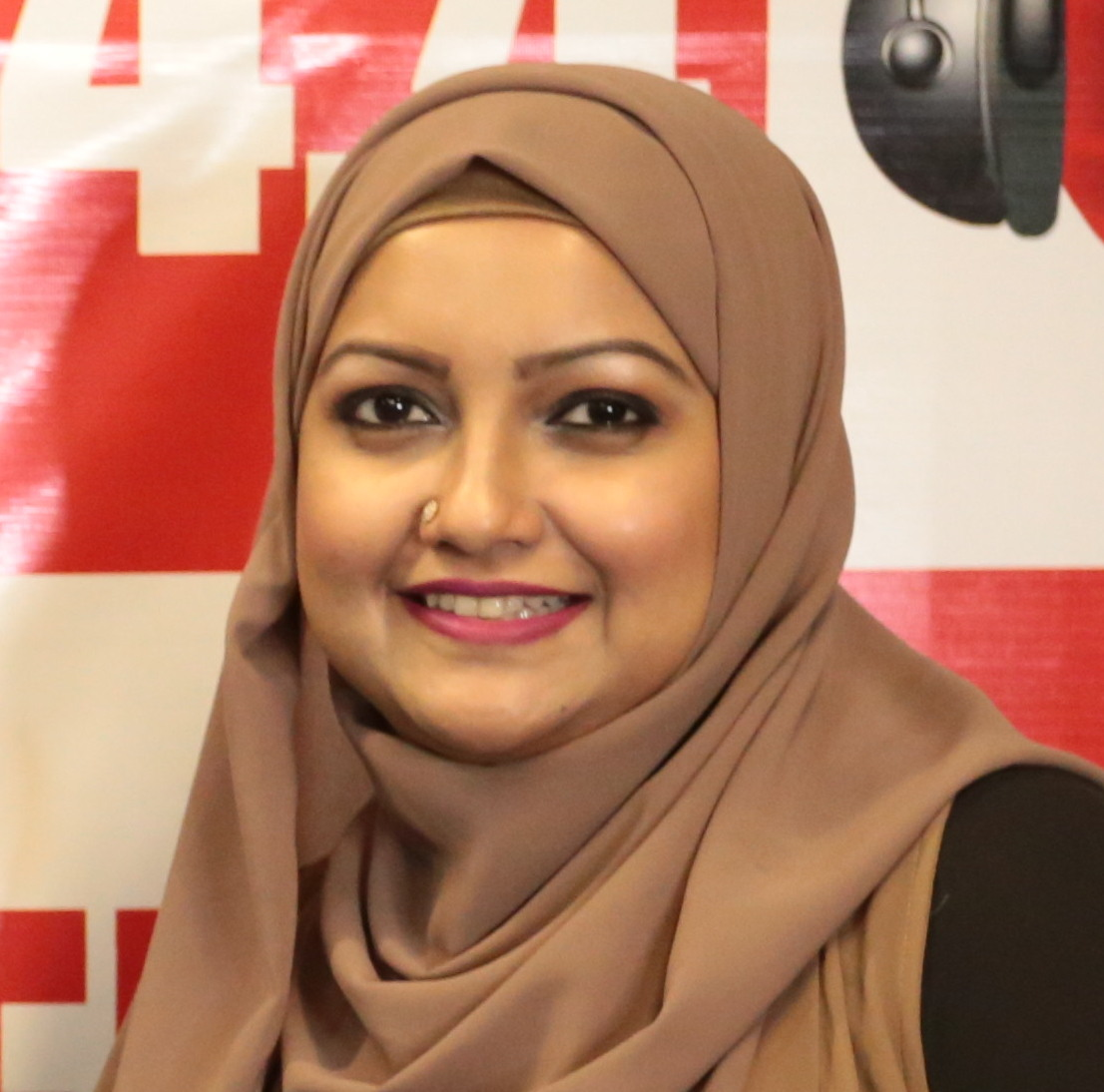
- Born: August 15, 1985 (age 40); Khulna, Bangladesh
- Education: LLB, BBA
- Occupations: TV actress, model, RJ
- Years active: 2007–present
- Spouse: Syed Adnan Faruque (m. 2013)
- Children: 2
- Awards: CJFB Performance Award for Best Television Actress (2012, 2014)

Signature
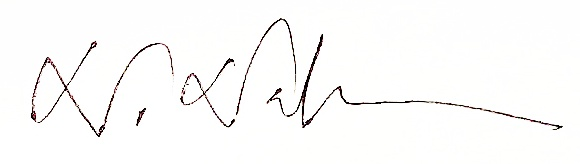

Nawsheen (Bengali: নওশীন; August 15, 1985) is a Bangladeshi television and film actress who has worked in many notable films such as prarthona, Mukhosh Manush. She has also worked as model, anchor and radio personality. She has played some notable plays, and also earned a reputation. She is working as model in different television commercials and print media since 2007. Among her notable films include prarthona, Mukhosh Manush, hello Amit (yet to release), dudu mia (yet to release) shuachan pakhi (yet to release). She has worked as radio jockey and producer in many Bangladeshi FM radio stations like (Radio Today, Radio Foorti, Dhaka FM and radio amber)

== Early life ==
Nawsheen Nahreen Mou was born in Khulna district although her childhood was spent in many districts. Her father SK Amzad Hussain was an engineer of BUET and mother is Housewife. She started dancing at the age of 7 and continued it for several years. She achieved the Khelaghar Award in her childhood in 1994. She started her career as a radio jockey with the first fm radio station of Bangladesh Radio Today in 2007. She was very popular as RJ Nawsheen for her voice and renown show ‘today’s adda’.Later she joined Radio Foorti. She started her television career with a live calling program, which was broadcast on RTV. The name of the program was "Jege Acho ki". It was one of the most popular shows at that time (2008-2011). She was in news for her other superhit programmes such as “Amar Ami’in Bangla Vision.

== Career ==
She launched her media career as a radio personality. Besides, she started working on commercial advertising. Now she is primarily known as an actress. She made her small screen debut with drama Dhoopchhaya. She made her film debut opposite her real life husband Hillol in Mukhosh Manush (2016). She is working as Freelance actress at television media and film since 2008 in different TV serials mega aerials daily soaps and special fictions. She also worked as a model on various television commercials and print media. Previously she was working as Radio jockey and producer in fm radios of Bangladesh. She has Worked as director programme at radio amber from 2015 till 2017 and deputy programme director at a leading channel of Bangladesh in 2010 (Channel i). She hosted the opening ceremony of the 2011 ICC Cricket World Cup.

=== Hosted programs ===
Years	Programs	TV channel
2009 - 2010	A cooking show	NTV
2010	live musical show	Channel I
2011	opening ceremony for ICC cricket World Cup 2011	
2016	National film award Bangladesh	
2016	Interview of war victims and freedom Fighter	BTV
2013	cricket critic show about Sri Lankan premier league	
2017	Ranna Juddho	Gazi TV
2018	2018 FIFA World Cup	Maasranga TV

=== Brand ambassador ===
- Nature secret face wash
- Pran spice (apnar sathei chilo)
- Pran gura dudh
- fresh milk powder
- Range freeze
- Hisense freeze
- Cooling A.C.
- So good television
- Keya detergent powder
- Banglalink network
- Elite fairness cream
- Foamex mattress
- Rosen 28
- Mangolee

=== TVC ===
Year	TVC Title	Director
2008	Banglalink	
2009	Pran gura Moshla	
2009	Hisense freeze	
2009	So good television	
2010	Mangoli	
2010	Keya detergent powder	
2010	Nature secret face wash	
2010	Cooline A.C.	
2011	Elite fairness cream	
2011	Fresh milk powder	
2012	Jononi ball pen	
2014	Bijoy rakin city	
2014	Pran milk powder	
2014	Rosen 28	
2015	Expo foam	
2016	Range freeze	

=== Television drama ===
Year	Title	Playwright & Director	TV Chanel	Co-stars	Notes
2009	Talk Show	Brindabon Dash, Mahfuz Ahmed	ATN Bangla		
2010	Shapla studio	brindabon dash, dipu hazra	ETV		
	Nioti	Sheikh Selim			
2015	Target	Mezba shikdar	ATN Bangla		
	Na bola kothati	mezba shikdar	NTV		
2014	Senora golpoti amader	senora, A.I. Raju	NTV		
2016	Khondokar Shaheb	Kajal Arefin Omi	SA TV		
2017	Chhobi	Kajal arefin omi	Channel 9		
2010	Shonkha Totto	masud sejan	Bangla Vision		
2017	10 Number Bipod Shonket	mezba uddin, Ahnaf	Desh TV		
	Morichika	Juthi, alvi ahmed	SA TV		
2012	Jorda Jamal	Hasan Morshed			
2017	Diba ratri courier service	Uzzal mahmud	RTV		
2016	Ekti biral birombona	Kajal arefin Omi	Deepto TV		
2012	Shesh rater brishti	sajjad shumon	NTV		
	Jadukor	imran ahmed	ATN Bangla		
	Motorcycle	Jahid hasan	ATN Bangla		
	Golpo noy shotti		Boishakhi TV		
	Boro bhalobashi tomay	Mohon Khan	ATN Bangla		
	Ghotok	Gitali Hasan	channel I		
	Ajob shohor Dhaka				
	Photocopy plus				
2011	Motor cycle	Zahid Hasan	ATN Bangla		
2009	Bhasha pelo bhalobasha	Rumman Rashid Khan, Chayanika Chowdhury	RTV		
	Bhalobasha ek polokei	Sanjay Barua			
2017	Tonatunir shongshar	shahid un nabi	Deepto TV		
2013	Shudhu ekta minute	ziauddin alam			
	Doito rup	mezba uddin, rahmatulla tuhin	RTV		
2017	Ami tumi o Tini	raihan Khan	Deepto TV		
2017	Betaar bhalobasha	Kajal arefin Omi	Deepto TV		
2010	Newyork	Wahid Anam	channel I		
	American dream	Wahid Anam	ATN Bangla		
	Mon amar	eva Rahman, anmona	ATN Bangla		
	Shomoyer bhalobasha oshomoy keno basho	Sanjay Barua	SA TV		
2017	Jobordost	Picklu Chowdhury	SA TV		
	Ashchorjo ek lal tip				
	Odbhut shei pathor				
	Tribhuj atta	rashed raha			
	Coxbazarer shondha	sarei siddiki	ATN Bangla		
	Bhalobashar porinoti				
	Nonta chaa	masum reza, komol Chowdhury	channel 9		
	Digbaji	komol chowdhury			
	Roktodron	shamima shammmi	channel 9		
	Ondhokarer shur	Akram Khan	NTV		
	Ratri kothon	Ononno mamun			
	Iti tomar ranu	anisul Hoq, Himel ashraf	masranga TV		
	Mia bibi	imran hossain imu	RTV		
2005	Shamrajjo	deepa hayat, Rubayet Mahmud	gazi TV		
	Bhalobashar nil achol	sadek Siddique	SA TV		
	Koshto purush	mahmud didar	deepto TV		
	Shadharon bonam oshadharon Ghotok				
	Akti doinondin premer golpo				
	Onukoron	masud Shejan			
	Ochena othiti				
	Lukochuri khela				
	Shikor	Iftekhar munim			
	Akti doinondin premer golpo	hasan Morshed	boishakhi TV		
	Moner akashe nil megh	ziauddin alam			
	Patri chai	Mohon Khan	banglavision		
	Patro chaina	Mohon khan	banglavision		
	Red door	anjan aich	ETV		
	Hotath dekha	Anjan aich	ETV		
	Ashchorjo lal tip	Anjan aich			
	Dipaboli	Arun Chowdhury	SA TV		
	Shodh	s a hoq Alik	SA TV		
	Lukochuri khela	din Mohammad Montu			
	Golpo noy shotti		boishakhi TV		
	Khola dorja		SA TV		
2017	Khola hridoy	sajin ahmed babu	channel 9		
	Char matray bhalobasha	Tamim hasan	boishakhi TV		
	Tamim hasan				
	Table number 9	ziauddin alam			
	Black November	Mahfuz Ahmed			
	Mon	Chayanika			
	Chilekothar shongshar	ridom khan			
	Ekdin chhuti hobe	hridoy zulfikar, Himel ashraf	NTV		
	Dokhinayoner din	sajjad shumon	NTV		
	Nir khoje gangchil	Mohon Khan	ATN Bangla		
	The Digital	Aman Chowdhury	channel 9		
	Ferrari	Ashim gomez	RTV		
	Metro life		NTV		
	Boiri batash	Sohan Khan, Jewel mahmud	ETV		
	Monsoon rain	Chayanika Chowdhury	channel 9		
	Joto dure jai	imdadul hoq milon, Chayanika Chowdhury	channel I		
	Mukhosh	shahdat shujon	ATN Bangla		
	Bi focul	shantonu, komol Chowdhury	banglavision		
	High society	sushmoy shumon, moinul Islam khokon	Asian TV		
	Mon chhueyeche mon	manik manobik	SA TV		
	Terminal	shantonu, shokal ahmed	NTV		
	Uramon	Mohammad noman	RTV		
	Agun poka	imran hawladar	channel I		
	Ghore baire	raju ahmrd	masranga TV		
	Dhupchhaya	Ezaz Munna	NTV		Mega serial
	Chairman bari	Arafat rokon	boishakhi TV		Mega serial
	Volumeta koman	Maruf rehman, Maruf mithu	ATN Bangla		Mega serial
	Mayar badhon	sushmoy shumon	boishakhi TV		Mega serial
	Palki	Mostofa Monon	Deepto TV		Mega serial
	Dolchhut projapoti	Faria Hossian, Arif Khan	NTV		Mega serial
	Chowdhury villa	faruk ahmed, himel ashraf	NTV		Mega serial
	Life in a metro	b u shubho	ATN Bangla		Mega serial
	Jiboner oligoli	fozlur Rahman	ATN Bangla		Mega serial
	Bou boka dey	Maruf rehman, Maruf mithu	ETV		Mega serial
	Bari bari shari Shari	Shafayet mansoor rana	NTV		Mega serial
	Comedy 420	akash ranjan, faridul hasan	boishakhi TV		Mega serial
	Khonikaloy	Azad abul Kalam, Akram khan	masranga TV		Mega serial
	Probashe porobashe	zeenat Hakim, Sakal ahmed	Chanel I		Mega serial
	Time	naznin chumki, aniruddho Rasel	channel 9		Mega serial
	Probhati shobuj shongho	shamim shahed	Chanel I		Mega serial
	Fanush	khan Mohammad bodruddin	Chanel I		Mega serial
	Choita pagol	Mahfuz Rahman	Chanel I		Mega serial
	Three comrades	dipu hazra	ETV		Mega serial
	Shoshuraloy Modhur aloy	alvi ahmed	Nagorik TV		Mega serial
	The family	alvi ahmed	bangla vision		Mega serial
	Tit for tat	alvi ahmed	RTV		Mega serial
	The corporate	alvi ahmed	Desh TV		Mega serial
	Shonar shekol	shantonu, shakil ahmed	ATN Bangla		Mega serial
	Daktar para	Chandon Chowdhury	Asian TV		Mega serial
	Joiboti koinna	akidul Islam, litu karim	RTV		Mega serial
	Chirokumari club	tariq hasan	ETV		Mega serial
	Rongila	rizwan Khan, kaysar ahmed	ETV		Mega serial
	Second innings	ideas haydar	Asian TV		Mega serial
	Nirbikar manush	masud mohiuddin	ATN Bangla		Mega serial
	Chhayaabrita	shantonu, tawkir ahmed	ATN Bangla		Mega serial
	Chhaya juddho	Akram Khan	ATN Bangla		Mega serial

=== Filmography ===
Films
Year	Films Name	Character	Director	Co-Star	Production	Note
2015	Prarthona	Prarthona	Shahriar Najim Joy		Impress Telefilm	
2016	Mukhosh Manush		Yasir Arafat jewel		Digi Motion	
	Hello Amit		Shankha Dasgupta			
	Dudu Mia		Dayel Rahman			
	Shuachan Pakhi		Shofikul Islam Bhoirabi			

== Awards ==
Awards
Years	Award Name	Categories	Results	Notes
2011	CJFB Performance Award for Best Television Actress 2011	Best Actress	Won	
2012	CJFB Performance Award for Best Television Actress 2012	Best Actress	Won	Natok: Moner Akashe Nill Megh
2014	CJFB Performance Award for Best Television Actress 2014	Best Actress	Won	Natok: Shesh Rater Bristi
2011	CJFB Performance Award for Best Television Actress 2011	Best Model	Won	
2010	CJFB Performance Award for Best Television Actress 2010	Best Model	Won	
2011	TRAB Award-2011	Best Actress	Won	

== See also ==
- Cinema of Bangladesh
- Media of Bangladesh
- Gangster Returns
- Tahsan Rahman Khan
