= Mosharraf Karim =

Bangladeshi actor

- মোশাররফ করিম
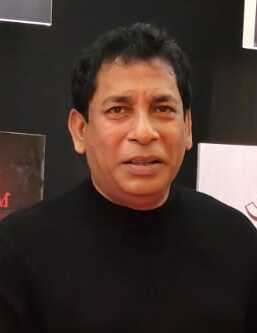
- Karim in 2026
- Pronunciation: [moʃaɾːɔf koɾim]
- Born: K M Mosharraf Karim; 22 August 1971 (age 55); Barisal, Bangladesh
- Other name: Shamim
- Occupation: Actor
- Years active: 1999–present
- Spouse: Robena Reza Jui 2004 ()

K M Mosharraf Hossain (born 22 August 1971), known by his stage name Mosharraf Karim (Note: Bengali pronunciation: [moʃaɾːɔf koɾim].) (Bengali pronunciation: [moʃaɾːɔf koɾim]), is a Bangladeshi television and film actor. A prominent actor in Bangladesh, he has received multiple awards for his contribution to the Bangladeshi entertainment industry, including the Meril Prothom Alo Awards and national-level honors.

== Early life ==
Before starting his acting career, he was a renowned Bengali teacher at the Haque Coaching Centre in Malibagh. Karim began working as a theatre artist in the late 1980s with Nattokendro, where he has continuously played lead roles in theatre productions for 16 years. He has collaborated several times with actor Chanchal Chowdhury.

In 1989, Karim participated in an audition initiated by Tariq Anam Khan, and out of 1400 participants, 25 were selected and given the opportunity to work in the theatre, including Karim. Then he joined the theater troupe "Nattokendro" and worked for 16 years continuously. After over a decade in theater, Karim debuted in television in 1999 with the single-episode TV play Atithi, directed by Ferdous Hasan and aired on Channel I. He has been a regular on the TV screen since February 2005.

== Career ==
=== Theatre and Television ===
In 2004, Karim played two important roles in two different television works. One of those roles included the popular telefilm Kyarom, where he performed with co-artist Nusrat Imroz Tisha. Before starring in the play Kyarom, Mosharraf Karim played the central role in only one play. That was 'Hefaz Bhai' directed by Syed Awlad.

In 2009, Karim acted in his first film Third Person Singular Number, with co-artist Nusrat Imroz Tisha. He acted in his first drama serial 420 aired on Channel I. Anik was the main star. After this, he worked in the two drama serials, Vober Hat and Ghor Kutum.

=== Films ===
Mosharraf Karim made his film debut in Daruchini Dwip (2007), directed by Tauquir Ahmed. He later starred in critically acclaimed films such as Television (2012) by Mostofa Sarwar Farooki and Komola Rocket (2018). Mosharraf Karim has ventured into playback singing with Fazlul Kabir Tuhin's film Bildakini. The song, Bhalo Bhalo Lage Na, was both written and composed by him. Besides providing vocals, he also appears on-screen performing the song in the movie.

=== Web Series ===
In recent years, he has gained popularity in digital media. His performance in the web series Mohanagar (2021) was widely praised, where he played the role of OC Harun.

== Personal life ==
Karim married Robena Reza Jui on 7 October 2004. Before starting his acting career, he was a renowned Bengali teacher at the Haque Coaching Centre in Malibagh.

Towards the end of 2005, he changed his name from Mosharraf Hossain to Mosharraf Karim. According to him, the surname, Karim, was taken from his father's name.

== Filmography ==
Key
†	Denotes films that have not yet been released

Year	Title	Role	Notes	Ref
2004	Joyjatra	Foni Moyra / Farid Ali	Debut Film	
2006	Rupkothar Golpo	Pickpocketer	Cameo appearance	
2007	Daruchini Dwip	Ayon / Boltu		
2009	Third Person Singular Number	Munna		
2011	Projapoti	Tarek		
2012	Television	Majnu		
2014	Jalal's Story	Jalal	Winner — Avanca Film Festival 2015 for Best Actor	
2016	Oggatonama	Forhad		
2017	Haldaa	Bolda		
2018	Komola Rocket	Mofizul		
2021	Dictionary	Makar Kanti Chatterjee	Debut Indian Film	
2022	Mukhosh	Ibrahim Khaledi		
2022	Daag	Alamgir	Webfilm on Chorki	
2024	Hubba	Hubba Shyamal	Indian Bengali Film	
2025	Ondhokarer Gaan	Mukul	Webfilm on Binge	
2025	Bildakini	Manik Majhi	Also Playback singer	
2025	Chokkor 302	Inspector Moinul		
2025	Insaaf	Shamsher		
2026	Bonolota Express	Rashid Uddin		

=== Web series ===
Year	Title	Role	OTT	Director	Notes
2021	Mohanagar	OC Harun Ur Rashid	Hoichoi	Ashfaque Nipun	
2022	Driver	Driver Rafiq	Bioscope	Iftakar Chowdhury	
2022	Dour	Ruhul Amin	Hoichoi	Raihan Khan	
2023	Mohanagar 2	OC Harun Ur Rashid	Hoichoi	Ashfaque Nipun	
2023	Mobaroknama	Adv. Mobarok Bhuiyaan	Hoichoi	Golam Sohrab Dodul	
2025	Bohemian Ghora	Ali Abbas	Hoichoi	Amitabh Reza Chowdhury	

== Television ==
Year	Title	Director	Role	Notes
1998	Otithi	Ferdous Hasan	Servant	First television appearance
2006	Vober Hat	Salauddin Lavlu	Bhashan Kha	106-episode TV series, ended in 2007
2008	House Full	Redoan Rony and Iftekhar Ahmed Fahmi	Ifti	122-episode mega-series, ended in 2009
2008	Aim in Life	Masud Sezan		
2009	Sakin Sarisuri	Salahuddin Lavlu	Ruiton	102-episode mega-serial, ended in 2010
2010	FnF: Friends 'n' Family	Redoan Rony	Johir	79-episode series, ended in 2011
2014	Tita Mitha Modhuchandrima	Jubair Ibn Bakar	Shaina's husband	Eye-catching Shaina's motorcycle riding scene
2015	Ghum Babu	Shahid Un-Nabi		6-episode TV series aired on Channel 9

== Awards and nominations ==
Year	Awards	Category	Film/Drama	Result
2008	Meril-Prothom Alo Awards	Best TV Actor (Critics Choice)	Deyal Almari	Won
2009	Meril-Prothom Alo Awards	Best TV Actor (Public Choice)	House Full	Won
2011	Meril-Prothom Alo Awards	Best TV Actor (Public Choice)	Chander Nijer Kono Alo Nei	Won
2012	Meril-Prothom Alo Awards	Best TV Actor (Critics Choice)	Jorda Jamal	Won
2012	Meril-Prothom Alo Awards	Best TV Actor (Public Choice)	Radio Chocolate	Nominated
2013	Meril-Prothom Alo Awards	Best TV Actor (Public Choice)	Sikandar Box Ekhon Birat Model	Won
2013	Meril-Prothom Alo Awards	Best TV Actor (Public Choice)	Sei Rokom Pan-Khor	Won
2013	Meril-Prothom Alo Awards	Best TV Actor (Critics Choice)	Sei Rokom Cha-Khor	Won
2026	BIFA Awards	Best OTT Actor (Jury Board)	Bohemian Ghora	Won
