= House Full (TV series) =

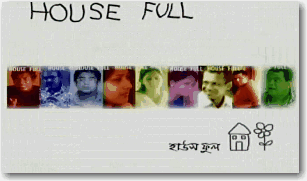
- Housefull
- Genre: Drama Serial
- Created by: Iftekhar Ahmed Fahmi
- Written by: Redoan Rony; Iftekhar Ahmed Fahmi
- Directed by: Redoan Rony; Iftekhar Ahmed Fahmi
- Starring: Abul Hayat; Mosharraf Karim; Sumon Patwary; Monira Mithu; Sohel Khan; Siddiqur Rahman; Sumaiya Shimu; Mithila; Mishu Sabbir; Adnan Faruque Hillol; Marzuk Russell; Ishtiak Ahmed Rumel; Hasan Masood; Zillur Rahman; Maznun Mizan; Sadia Jahan Prova; Aparna Ghosh; Nova Firoz; Monalisa; Tinni
- Theme music composer: Ayub Bacchu
- Country of origin: Bangladesh
- Original language: Bengali
- No. of seasons: 1
- No. of episodes: 122

Production
- Producers: Iftekhar Ahmed Fahmi; Aditto Monir
- Production locations: Dhaka; Faridpur
- Running time: 22 minutes (episode)
- Production company: G Series

Original release
- Network: Dramaserial
- Release: 14 October 2008 – 23 July 2009

Related
- House Full Plus

Housefull is a Bangladeshi drama serial written by Redoan Rony and Iftekhar Ahmed Fahmi and also directed by them. The 122 episode TV dramaserial was aired on NTV and the last episode was aired on July 23, 2009. The drama serial has an urban setting of the modern Dhaka, depicting colourful and interesting lifestyles of some families living in Dhaka. This drama stars Abul Hayat, Sohel Khan, Sumon Patwary, Mosharraf Karim, Monira Mithu, Siddiqur Rahman, Sumaiya Shimu, Mithila, Mishu Sabbir, Adnan Faruque Hillol, Hasan Masood, Zillur Rahman, Maznun Mizan, Ishtiak Ahmed Rumel, Marzuk Russell, Nova Firoz, Sadia Jahan Prova, Aparna Ghosh, Monalisa and Tinni

== Plot ==
Housefull revolves around the lives of two neighbours, both named Ikramul Haq. Barring the name, the duo share nothing in common. One is an architect and another one is a developer. The architect Ikramul Haq (Abul Hayat) is an environmentalist, while the builder Ikramul Haq (Sohel Khan) has no qualms about cutting down trees if they impinge on his work. The other characters in the play are architect Ikramul Haq's elder daughter Shimu (Sumaiya Shimu), who is a student of civil engineering. His younger daughter Mithila (Mithila), who is a student of physics while the youngest son Mishu, an urban man who studies in a private university. Also dwelling in his house is his wife, Mithu (Monira Mithu) who is a very aggressive though caring character. His wife also has a brother, Ifty (Mosharraf Karim), living in the house, and also in the same room with the brother of Ikramul Haq himself, called Sumon (Schumonn Patwary). Ifty is a nice person, but can be very irritating at times, and he has a tendency of teasing Sumon, who has a concerning weight problem. This is the full family of architect Ikramul Haq, and they live very happily together, besides tolerating some quarrels of the next door neighbours.

On the other hand, the builder Ikramul Haq never married, as he holds on to the memories of a woman, Sharmeen (Sharmeen Sheila), he loved and lost. He lives with a nephew of his, and his name is Siddique (Siddiqur Rahman). Siddique is a happy going person who always has a smile on his face and loves his uncle dearly. Another character is Hasan (Hasan Masood). He is madly in love with his girlfriend Faria (Aparna Ghosh), and plans to marry to her, and they both agree to it. The only obstacle in the way of their marriage is the gangster brother of Faria, who is totally against any men seeing his sister, until her marriage.

The story of Housefull revolves around these characters and families. Many of these characters experience difficult relationships with their friends or love interests, or just life itself. These problems and complications follow as the drama serial progresses, and bring about very comical moments.

== Characters ==
- Architect Ikramul Haq (Abul Hayat) - Ikramul Haq is a very successful and experienced architect, living the urban city of Dhaka. He is the father of two daughters and one son, Shimu, Mithila and Mishu. All his children have reached passed High School and pursued further studies onto University. Ikramul is a merry man who very much loves his life, including his family dearly. Though a very simple man, he tends to always worry about the threat of earthquakes devastating buildings of Dhaka. He believes the construction of the buildings are not right, and are definitely not earthquake proof. He wants a solution for this problem, but realizes some solutions are very hard to find. Besides his career beliefs, Ikramul is a very practical man who knows how to handle many situations that occur in his family or even out of his family. He is extremely proud of his family and dearly loves his wife and children
- Builder Ikramul Haq (Sohel Khan) - Builder Ikramul Haq is the neighbour of Architect Ikramul Haq, and he has also had a reasonably successful career. Ikramul has the tendency to give people a very hard time over very small issues, and the victim of builder Haq is next door neighbours, the Haq family. As he ages he starts to think about his life, as he has not married yet, and what he has achieved. He was in a relationship with a fairly young women, called Sharmeen. He loved her very much but their relationship does not last long, as Sharmeen kept pushing for a marriage, and Ikramul kept stalling and stalling with excuses. As the story progresses, their relationship breaks and Ikramul becomes extremely sad. He lives with his nephew called Siddique, who is always smiling and laughing. Siddique loves his uncle Ikramul and Ikramul also cares and loves his nephew as if he is his son.
- Ifty (Mosharraf Karim) - Ifty is the younger brother of Mithu, who is the wife of architect Ikramul Haq. He is therefore the uncle of Shimu, Mithila and Mishu. He arrives in Dhaka in the third episode of the dramaserial, and straight away moves into the house of Ikramul. Ifty is a happy going and funny man, who at times may become irritating to some people. Nevertheless, everyone in the family love him and they do not mind him staying in the house. He lives in the same room as Sumon, the brother of Ikramul Haq, and he tends to tease him quite a lot about his weight, as Sumon is very overweight, bringing about many humorous moments. As the story progresses, Ifty starts to realise that he is the person who has to solve all sorts of problems in the family. And it is somewhat true that problems are dealt by him, and they are done very well, usually. Ifty had interests of going overseas to other countries such as Australia and America. He participates in many tests to achieve the right to go overseas, and also spends a lot of money for these tests. After he fails the 'IELTS' test, which is the compulsory test needed to be done in order to go to Australia, he gives up on the dream to live in Australia. This makes his brother-in-law and his sister furious, because it was from them that Ifty had borrowed money from. In the latter part of the serial, Ifty starts to dream about making a movie, but money, once again is the issue for his dream.
- Sumon (Sumon Patwary) - Sumon is the younger brother of architect Haq, and the brother-in-law of Monira. Sumon is a very loved and respected person in the family. He is also a very responsible member of the family, as he also solves many problems and situations in the family. Just like Ifty, Sumon also moved into the house, but it was a long time before Ifty had joined. Though he is quite overweight, he is not very lazy at all. This is because he always loves completing his own chores, such as washing his own clothes, ironing his own clothes, and also getting usual groceries for the family. Sumon has another reason for doing his own work, that is because his sister-in-law, Mithu, has to do all housework by herself, as there is no servant in the house. Unlike Ifty, Sumon has a job at an office, which he regularly attends every day. Despite his quite busy life, he has a lot time to spend with his family, especially with his two nieces and nephew.
- Mithu (Monira Mithu) - Mithu is the wife of architect Ikramul Haq and the mother of three children. She is the most aggressive member of this family, but also the most caring member of the family. She tends to get upset or angry when something is not right, and also may argue with her kids or even her husband. But although her moody character, she still has time to love and care for her family and kids. Mithu is a housewife, and a very busy one indeed. She never complains about being a housewife, but her complain is the amount of work she has to do. Mithu often pleads to her husband to get a servant to help her in her duties. Ikramul tries, but fails, due to the lack of servants available in Dhaka. The result of Mithu working hard all day is an angry, tempered and aggressive woman. As the story advances, Shimu, the elder daughter, starts to think about and arrange a marriage, Mithu slowly realizes how much she really loves her children, and how she will feel when Shimu, or her other kids, are married into another house. Imagining her house without her children, especially daughters, Mithu starts to devote more time for her children and less time for work.
- Siddique (Siddiqur Rahman) - Siddique is the lovable, but at times irritating nephew of builder Haq, and fortunately or unfortunately the neighbour of architect Haq. Siddique lives with his uncle since he left his whole family in his village to stay in Dhaka. Although Siddique sometimes feels sad as he misses his family, he always keeps a smile on his face and enjoys every moment of his life. If he is slapped, insulted or even feeling unhappy, he will still be smiling and laughing. Many of the people living in the apartments of his building find him and his smile irritating. But as the story develops, these same people wonder how it is possible to have a smile on one's face through periods of sadness and unhappiness. Characters such as Mithu, Ifty, Mishu and Shimu realize that it is very difficult to keep a smile on your face every moment, let alone just hard times. These characters later tell Siddique that he is a very brave man and tell him to never ever stop smiling and laughing. The family of architect Haq start to see Siddique as one of their own, and also start to love him just like his uncle loves him.
- Mishu Sabbir as Mishu
- Sumaiya Shimu as Shimu
- Mithila as Mithila
- Adnan Faruque Hilol as Niaz
- Nova Firoz as Konika aka Koni
- Ishtiak Ahmed Rumel as Rumel
- Hasan Masood as Hasan
- Marzuk Russell as Sujon
- Zillur Rahman as Hannan
- Maznun Mizan as Billal
- Aparna Ghosh as Faria
- Sharmeen Shila as Sharmeen
- Rifat Chowdhury as Gach Premi Rifat Chowdhury
- Sadia Jahan Prova as Jenny
- Monalisa
- Tinni
- Shadhin Khosru
- Mahmudul Islam Mithu
- Kamal Hossain Babor as Konika's Uncle
- Milon Bhattacharya
- Rayyan
- Tonu as Tonu
- Nafa as Nafa
- Rajib Ahmed

== See also ==
- Songsoptok
- Bohubrihi
- Kothao Keu Nei
- Baker Bhai
- Aaj Robibar
- Vober Hat
- Doll's House (TV series)
- Bishaash
