= Robena Reza Jui =

Bangladeshi actress

- রোবেনা রেজা জুঁই
- Born: 1982 (age 43–44); Dhaka, Bangladesh
- Education: University of Dhaka
- Occupation: Actress
- Years active: 2000–present
- Spouse: Mosharraf Karim (m. 2004)
- Children: 1

Robena Reza Jui (Bengali: রোবেনা রেজা জুঁই; born 1982) is a Bangladeshi actress who works in television and film. She has appeared in more than 150 television plays, over a hundred of them opposite her husband, the actor Mosharraf Karim.

== Early life and education ==
Jui was born in 1982; her family is from Jamalpur District. She studied music during school and college, and went on to take a bachelor's and a master's degree in anthropology at the University of Dhaka. Her master's thesis examined the position and working environment of women in the media.

== Career ==
Jui's research on the media led her to observe film shoots, which drew her towards acting; she began performing after her son turned three. Her first television play was Similar 2. She has since appeared in more than 150 plays, including over a hundred with Mosharraf Karim.

Her film appearances include Television, Oggatonama and Gangkumari. She also played Sitara, the second wife of a Razakar, in Maa, directed by Aranyo Anawer and shot in Kapasia, Gazipur.

Jui and Mosharraf Karim starred in the short film Aborto – The Circle, directed by Mahamudul Hasan Tipu, which was selected for the eighth Bengali Film Festival of Dallas in 2025. In 2026 she appeared in the television series Shadi Mubarak, directed by Shamim Zaman and broadcast on Maasranga Television.

In a 2021 interview she said that she never wanted to retire from acting, because of the range of characters the work allowed her to play.

== Personal life ==
Jui married the actor Mosharraf Karim on 7 October 2004, after a courtship of about four years. The two had met at a coaching centre in Dhaka where Karim taught and where she later worked as an instructor. They have one son, Roben Rayan Karim.
