= Chandragrohon =

2008 Bangladeshi film

- Chandragrohon DVD cover
- Directed by: Murad Parvez
- Written by: Syed Mustafa Siraj
- Produced by: Azom Faruk
- Starring: Riaz; Sohana Saba; Champa; Dilara Zaman; Shahiduzzaman Selim; Kazi Riton
- Cinematography: Mahfuzur Rahman Khan
- Edited by: Tawfiq Hossain Chowdhury
- Music by: Imon Saha; Habib Wahid
- Release date: 29 November 2008
- Country: Bangladesh
- Language: Bengali

Chandragrohon: The Lunar Eclipse (Bengali: চন্দ্রগ্রহণ) is a Bangladeshi film based on a short story written by Indian Bengali author Syed Mustafa Siraj. The film was released in 2008, marking the directorial debut of Murad Parvez. The film features Riaz, Sohana Saba, and Champa in lead roles along with Shahiduzzaman Selim, KS Firoz, Dilara Zaman, Kohinur, Gazi Rakayet, Azom Faruk and Kazi Riton in supporting roles. In 2008, the film won three National Film Awards and four other awards.

== Story ==
A mad woman (Champa) lived near the Marwari Ghat. People from the market had sexual relationships with her at night. As a result, she became pregnant. Moyra Masi (Dilara Zaman) starts to look after her in these circumstances. One rainy night, she gives birth to a little girl, and after four years she (Champa) dies. Moyra Masi looks after the little girl. The girl (Sohana Saba) does not get any name and so everyone calls her Falani.

== Cast ==
- Riaz - Kasu
- Sohana Saba - Falani
- Champa - Sokhi Pagli
- Shahiduzzaman Selim - Ismail Driver
- KS Firoz - Abul
- Dilara Zaman - Moyra Mashi
- Kohinur - Modon
- Gazi Rakayet - Shombhu
- Azom Faruk - Marwari owner of Caubeji
- Kazi Riton - Raja

== Music ==
Chandragrohon

Soundtrack album by Habib Wahid and Emon Saha
- Released: 2008
- Genre: Film soundtrack
- Producer: Laser Vision

Habib Wahid chronology
Amar Ache Jol (2008)	Chandrogrohon (2008)	Third Person Singular Number (2009)

Chandragrohon film songs were composed by Habib Wahid and Imon Saha. The film's songs were written by Kabir Bakul, Jewel Mahmud, Mohammad Rafiquzzaman, and Arko Mostofa. There are a total of 11 songs in the film. Singers are Habib Wahid, Samina Chowdhury, Nancy, Dinat Jahan Munni and Subir Nandi.

=== Song list ===
Track	Song	Singers	Notes
1	"Tomare Dekhilo"	Habib Wahid and Nancy	
2	"Moner Jore Cholse Deho"	Habib Wahid	
3	"De Dol De Dola"	Dinat Jahan Munni	
4	"Kon Shohore Jabi"	Samina Chowdhury	
5	"Kon Banshori"	Dinat Jahan Munni	
6	"Eker Sathe Ek Mile"	Bari Siddiqui	
7	"De Dula De" (male)	Emon Saha	
8	"Ayre Sokhi Boron Kori"	Subir Nandi	
9	"Dour"	S I Tutul	
10	"Agun Jole R Nive Na"	S I Tutul	
11	"Jibon Mane Jongi Joddho"	S I Tutul	

== Awards ==
=== Rainbow Film Festival ===
- The winner of the 2009 Best Movies

=== National Film Awards ===
Chandragrohon won National Film Award and also other four awards totally seven sections.

- Won Best Director - Murad Parvez
- Won Best Dialogue - Murad Parvez
- Won Best Screenwriter - Murad Parvez
- Won Best Producer - Azom Faruk
- Won Best Music Director - Emon Saha and Habib Wahid
- Won Best Actress in a Supporting Role - Champa and Dilara Jaman
- Won Best Actor in a Negative Role - Jahirauddn Peer

=== Meril Prothom Alo Awards ===
Chandragrohon won two Meril Prothom Alo Awards:

- Won Best Film
- Won Best Director - Murad Parvez.

=== Bacasasa Film and Culture Award ===
- Won: Best Film - Azom Faruk

== See also ==
- Brihonnola
- Hridoyer Kotha
