= Shera Radhuni =

- Genre: Reality; Cookery
- Judges: Siddika Kabir (Seasons 1-2); Hosne Ara (Season 1); Rahima Sultana Rita (Seasons 2-4, 6-); Nahid Osman (Season 3); Kalpana Rahman (Seasons 3, 5); Subhabrata Moitra (Season 4-7); Dilara Hanif Purnima (Season 5-); Nayeem Ashraf (Season 8-)
- Country of origin: Bangladesh
- Original language: Bengali
- No. of seasons: 7
- No. of episodes: 100+

Production
- Running time: 46–48 minutes
- Production company: Square Consumer Products Ltd

Original release
- Network: Channel i (Seasons 1–2); Maasranga Television (Season 3-present)
- Release: 2006 – present

Shera Radhuni is a Bangladeshi competitive cooking reality TV show. The show was launched by Square Consumer Products Ltd and first premiered on 2006 on Channel i and then on Maasranga Television from 2012.

== Format ==
Initial round consist of many contestants from across Bangladesh individually auditioning by presenting a dish before the three judges to gain one of the first 20 places.

== Series ==
Season	Judges	Host	No. of episodes	First Aired	Last Aired	Winner	Runner-up	Ref.
1	Siddika Kabir; Hosne Ara	Tania Ahmed		7 February 2006	2006	Jubaida		
2	Siddika Kabir; Rahima Sultana Rita			2008		Rowshan Ara Begum	Rubi	
3	Rahima Sultana Rita; Nahid Osman; Kalpana Rahman		16	11 May 2012	30 June 2012	Ferdous Zahan Pabon	Humaira Raihana Khan	
4	Subhabrata Moitra; Rahima Sultana Rita	Rumana Malik Munmun	22	12 December 2015	23 February 2016	Sabina Siraji	Saifa Alam Sanchi	
5	Subhabrata Moitra; Kalpana Rahman; Dilara Hanif Purnima	Rumana Malik Munmun	27	12 January 2018	13 April 2018	Mahafuzur Rahman	Farhana Habib	
6	Subhabrata Moitra; Rahima Sultana Rita; Dilara Hanif Purnima	Maria Nur	27	2 April 2021	9 July 2021	Sadia Taher	Nadia Natasha	
7	Subhabrata Moitra; Rahima Sultana Rita; Dilara Hanif Purnima	Srabonno Towhida	27	16 December 2022	18 March 2023	Eyerish Atiar	Sadia Kamal Urmee	
8	Nayeem Ashraf; Rahima Sultana Rita; Dilara Hanif Purnima	Mousumi Mou	37	7 March 2025	25 July 2025	Nisat Anjum	Tamanna Yesmin	

== Seasons ==
=== Season 1 ===
Shera Radhuni 1412 aired from 7 February 2006 on Channel i. Hosted by Tania Ahmed. Judges were Siddika Kabir and Hosne Ara.

=== Season 2 ===
Shera Radhuni 1414 aired from 2008 on Channel i. Judges were Siddika Kabir and Rahima Sultana Rita. It was won by Rowshan Ara Begum.

=== Season 3 ===
Shera Radhuni 1418 aired from 11 May 2012 to 30 June 2012 on Maasranga Television. Judges were Rahima Sultana Rita, Nahid Osman and Kalpana Rahman. It was won by Ferdous Zahan Pabon.

=== Season 4 ===
Shera Radhuni 1422 aired from 12 December 2015 to 23 February 2016 on Maasranga Television. Hosted by Rumana Malik Munmun. Judges were Subhabrata Moitra and Rahima Sultana Rita. It was won by Sabina Siraji.

=== Season 5 ===
Shera Radhuni 1424 aired from 12 January 2018 to 13 April 2018 on Maasranga Television. Hosted by Rumana Malik Munmun. Judges were Subhabrata Moitra, Kalpana Rahman and Dilara Hanif Purnima. It was won by Mahafuzur Rahman (from Bogura). The first runner up was Farhana Habib (from Dhaka) and the second runner up was Nazia Farhana (from Dhaka).

=== Season 6 ===
Shera Radhuni 1427 aired from 2 April 2021 to 9 July 2021 on Maasranga Television. Hosted by Maria Noor. Judges were Subhabrata Moitra, Rahima Sultana Rita and Dilara Hanif Purnima. It was won by Sadia Taher (from Chattogram). The first runner up was Nadia Natasha (from Khulna) and the second runner up was Moriom Hossain Nupur (from Dhaka).

=== Season 7 ===
Shera Radhuni 1429 aired from 16 December 2022 to 18 April 2023 on Maasranga Television. Hosted by Srabonno Towhida. Judges were Subhabrata Moitra, Rahima Sultana Rita and Dilara Hanif Purnima. It was won by Eyerish Atiar (from Dhaka). The first runner up was Sadia Kamal Urmee (from Dhaka) and the second runner up was Ferdous Ara Tuin (from Raj Shahi).

=== Season 8 ===
Shera Radhuni Season 8 aired from 7 March 2025 to 25 July 2025 on Maasranga Television. Hosted by Mousumi Mou. Judges were Nayeem Ashraf, Rahima Sultana Rita and Dilara Hanif Purnima. It was won by Nisat Anjum (from Narayanganj). The first runner up was Tamanna Yesmin (from Bogura) and the second runner up was Juairia Kamal (from Naogaon).
