= Boli (TV series) =

Bangladeshi crime drama streaming television series

- Bengali: বলি
- Genre: Crime; Drama
- Created by: Sarder Saniat Hossain; Robiul Alam Robi; Naseef Faruque Amin
- Directed by: Shankha Dasgupta
- Starring: Chanchal Chowdhury; Sohana Saba
- Theme music composer: Emon Chowdhury
- Opening theme: "BOLI" by Tanzir Tuhin
- Composer: Emon Chowdhury
- Country of origin: Bangladesh
- Original language: Bengali
- No. of seasons: 1
- No. of episodes: 7

Production
- Executive producers: Zakia Rashid Meem; Robiul Alam Robi; Dip Saha
- Producers: Iresh Zaker; Sarder Saniat Hossain
- Production locations: Kuakata, Patuakhali
- Cinematography: Tahsin Rahman
- Editor: Russell Panna
- Production company: The Good Company

Original release
- Network: Hoichoi
- Release: 3 December 2021

Boli is a Bangladeshi crime drama streaming television series created by Sarder Saniat Hossain, Robiul Alam Robi and Naseef Faruque Amin that released on Hoichoi on 3 December 2021. All the episodes of the series has been directed by Shankha Dasgupta Which stars Chanchal Chowdhury, Sohana Saba, Safa Kabir, Salahuddin Lavlu, Lutfur Rahman George, and Iresh Zaker.

== Premise ==
Boli, Hoichoi TV's latest series from Bangladesh, is a twist in the legendary Persian tale of 'Rustom And Sohrab'. Crime lord Sohrab Chanchal Chowdhury rules the island of Cheradiya with a brutal hand. Lawlessness thrives, and Sohrab's guns and gunmen do all the talking. Into this wildworld lands an injured stranger, who's lost his memory. The local brothel inmates nurse him back to health and give him the name, Rustom. He emotionally involves with Ayesha, daughter of local Imam. Will Rustom spell the end of Sohrab's reign of terror?

== Cast ==
- Chanchal Chowdhury as Sohrab Company
- Shohel Mondol as Rustom
- Sohana Saba as Anarkali
- Safa Kabir as Ayesha
- Salahuddin Lavlu as Mojid Company
- Ziaul Hoque Polash as Nizam
- Nasir Uddin Khan as Shahjahan Boli
- Lutfur Rahman George as Selim Chairman
- Iresh Zaker as Joynal Hujur
- Kazi Roksana Ruma as Mata Mohuri
- Rishad Mahmud as Police
- Mousumi Mou as Sohrab's Wife

== Production ==
Principal photography has taken place in various locations of Kuakata in Patuakhali district and Manikganj district of Bangladesh in September 2021, with production design and art direction by Tareq Bablu.

== Release ==
Boli aired on Hoichoi on 3 December 2021, all the episodes has been available immediately.

== Reception ==
The series mostly got negative to mixed reviews from critics and audiences. Aysha Zaheen from The Daily Star criticized the dialogues and the direction and said, "Boli was merely an attempt at producing a good crime thriller, falling short in many places. Often stretched out with lengthy shots, unnecessary dialogues, and unreasonable plotlines, the series fails to get its point across throughout the span of seven inconsistent episodes". Leisure Byte reviewer Archi Sengupta gave the series 2 out of 5 and said, "It's entertaining but loses all of its steam quickly, becoming a mess of a show without much rhyme or reason. Also, just so much dialogue, just so much unnecessary dialogue!"

== Episodes ==
No. overall	Episode	Directed by	Original release date	Duration (minutes)
1	"Namhin byekti"	Shankha Dasgupta	3 December 2021	36
2	"Joar, Bhata"	Shankha Dasgupta	3 December 2021	34
3	"Roktopat theke jano"	Shankha Dasgupta	3 December 2021	23
4	"Keu chilo, Keu chilo na"	Shankha Dasgupta	3 December 2021	18
5	"Dui premi"	Shankha Dasgupta	3 December 2021	23
6	"Keu mrittur sringkhole, Keu khomotar"	Shankha Dasgupta	3 December 2021	29
7	"Somoy miloner baire"	Shankha Dasgupta	3 December 2021	23

== Awards ==
Award Title	Category	Awardee	Result	Ref
Hoichoi Awards	Breakthrough Performance of the Year	Chanchal Chowdhury	Won	
