= Se Amar Mon Kereche =

Bangladeshi romantic action film

- Directed by: Sohanur Rahman Sohan
- Written by: Anonno Mamun
- Produced by: Shapla Kathachitra
- Starring: Shakib Khan; Tinni; Alamgir; Misha Sawdagor
- Music by: Showkat Ali Emon
- Distributed by: Sondhani Kathachitra
- Release date: 20 August 2012
- Country: Bangladesh
- Language: Bengali

Se Amar Mon Kereche is a 2012 Bengali romantic action film directed by Sohanur Rahman Sohan. The film stars Shakib Khan and Tinni in the lead roles, with Ahmed Sharif, Misha Sawdagor and Alamgir in supporting roles. Se Amar Mon Kereche was released on 20 August 2012.

== Cast ==
- Shakib Khan
- Srabosti Dutta Tinni
- Alamgir
- Misha Sawdagor
- Ahmed Sharif
- Prabir Mitra
- Rehana Jolly
- Afzal Sharif

== Music ==
Music directed by Showkat Ali Emon, Singers Endru Kishore, Kumar Bishwajit, Rezia Parvin & Kanak Chapa

Songs	Singers	Lyrics	Notes
"Tumi Ami Ami Tumi Ar Shopno Ghera Kichu Gaan"	Kumar Bishwajit & Rezia Parvin		
"Baire Theke Ashbena Keu....Ekta Kamrate Bondi"			
"Amar Thake Jodi Lokko Kuti Mon, Taar Shobgulo"			
"O Shathi Shuno Shathi Tomay Daki Shure Shure"			
"Ami Bhaobasha Prem Bujhina, Bujhi Tomakei"			
