= Adnan Faruque =

Bangladeshi model, actor and presenter

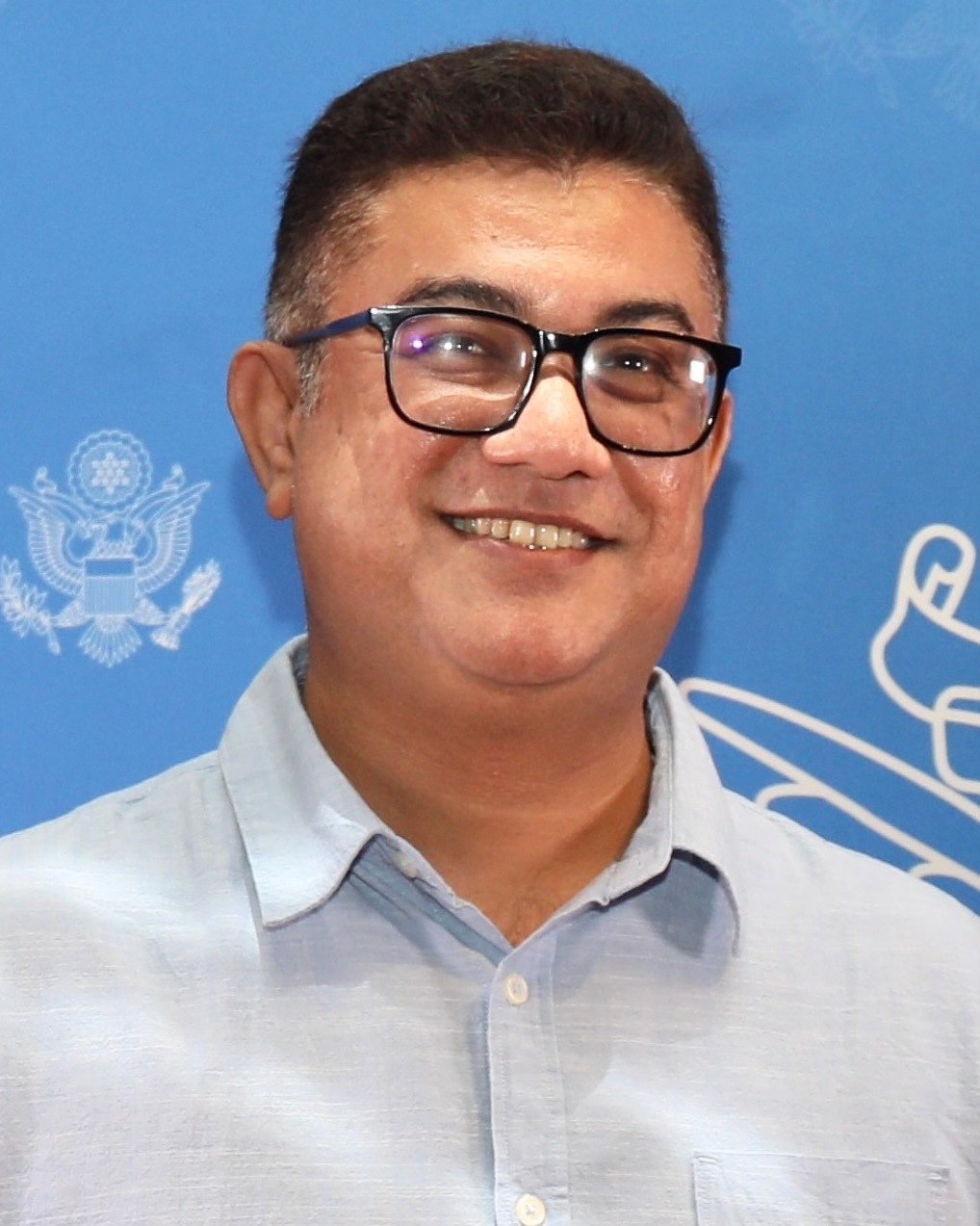
- Born: Syed Adnan Faruque; 24 October 1979 (age 47); Sylhet, Bangladesh
- Other name: Hillol
- Occupations: Actor, model, presenter, YouTuber
- Years active: 1999–present
- Spouses: Srabosti Dutta Tinni (m. 2006; div. 2012); Nawsheen Nahreen Mou (m. 2013)

YouTube information
- Channels: Adnan Faruque; Adnan Faruque Vlog
- Years active: 2017 – present
- Genres: Food blogging; vlog
- Subscribers: Adnan Faruque: 768K; Adnan Faruque Vlog: 145k
- Views: Adnan Faruque: 128 million Adnan Faruque Vlog: 8.35 million
- Last updated: 4 Sept, 2024

Syed Adnan Faruque (Bengali: সৈয়দ আদনান ফারুক; born 24 October 1979), also known as Hillol, is a Bangladeshi YouTuber and actor. He made his film debut in Chorabali in 2012. He has starred in several drama serials including Mukhosh Manush, Highway, Three Comrades, Terminal, and No Problem. His YouTube channels focus on food and travel vlogs.

== Early life ==
Faruque was born on 24 October 1979 to a Bengali Muslim family in Sylhet, Bangladesh. His father later moved to Khulna with family for government service. His theater life began in 1995 through "Desh Natok".

== Career ==
He played in theater early in his career. He began his acting career by appearing in Chorabali. Later he starred in another film called Hello Amit.

== Works ==
=== Films ===
Year	Film name	Role	Director	Notes
2012	Chorabali	Police Officer	Redoan Rony	
	Hello Amit		Shankha Dasgupta	
2016	Bhola To Jay Na Tare		Rafique Sikder	

=== Dramas ===
Year	Title	Director	Notes
2005	Romjier Ayna	Shihab Shaheen	
2008	House Full	Redoan Rony and Iftekhar Ahmed Fahmi	
2016	Mukhosh Manush		
2018	Nir Choto Khoti Nei		
2010	Eti Ebong		
2010	Pagli Tomar Songe		
2010	Word Number 77		
2010	Bine Suta		
2010	Kufa Majid		
	Lilaboti		
	Ghuri Ore		
2017	Tirigiri Tokka (Season 1)		
2019	Tirigiri Tokka (Season 2)		
