= Sadia Jahan Prova =

Bangladeshi model and actress

- সাদিয়া জাহান প্রভা
- Born: 30 March 1988 (age 38); Shariatpur, Bangladesh
- Occupations: Model, actress
- Years active: 2005–present
- Spouses: Ziaul Faruq Apurba (m. 2010; div. 2011) Mahmud Shanto (m. 2012; div. 2014)

Sadia Jahan Prova (born 30 March 1988) is a Bangladeshi model and actress.

== Personal life ==
Prova married actor Ziaul Faruq Apurba in August 2010 after a premarital relationship with him and the marriage ended in a divorce. The couple got divorced in February 2011. She married Mahmud Shanto in 2012 and that marriage also ended in divorce in 2014.

== Television drama serials ==
- House Full
- Porer Meye
- Rasta
