= Chhera Island =

Island in Bangladesh

Coordinates: 20.5808°N 92.3372°E

Native name: ছেঁড়া দ্বীপ
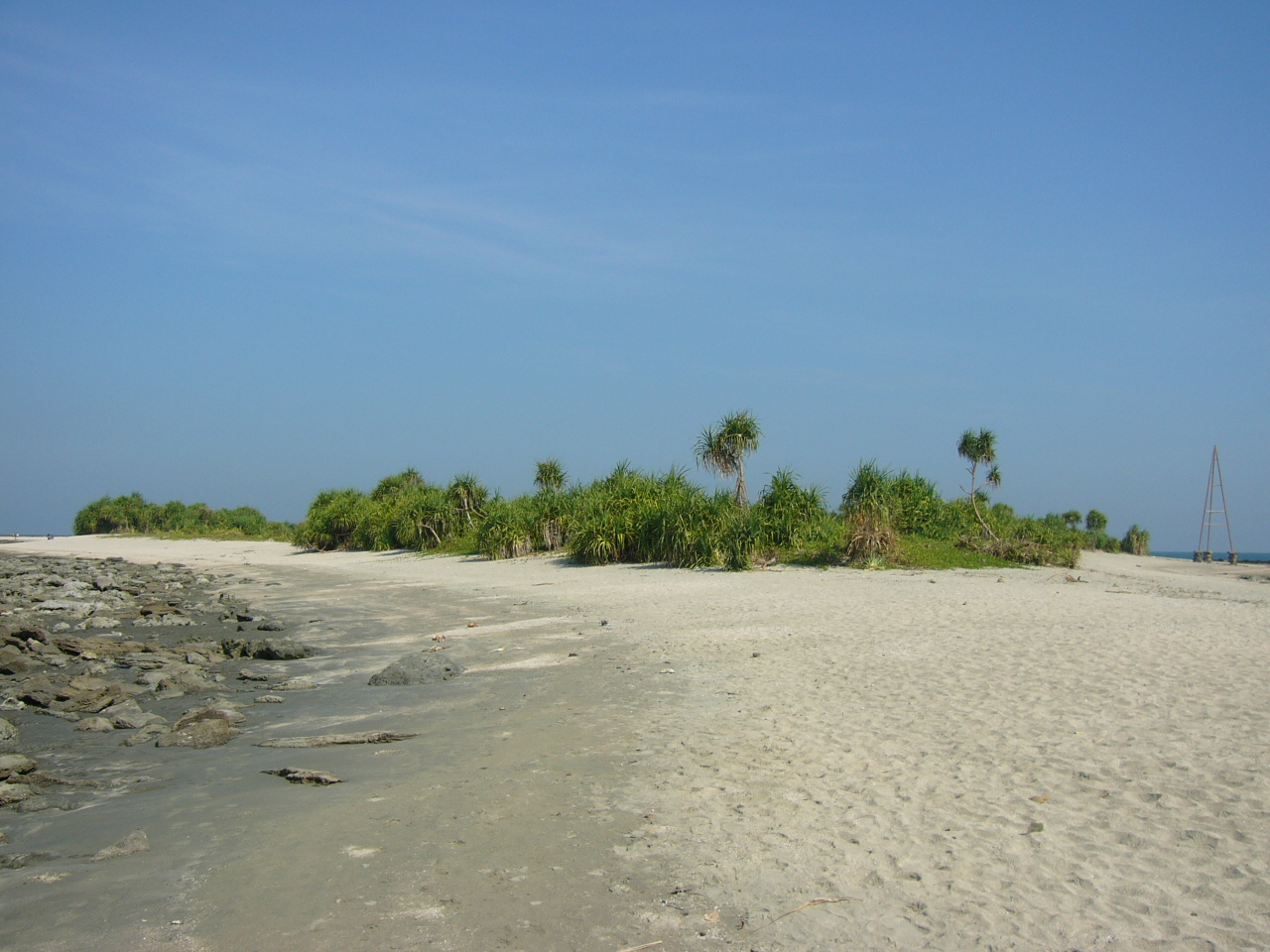
- Chhera Island
- Interactive map of Chhera Island

Geography
- Location: Bay of Bengal
- Archipelago: Extension of St. Martin's Island

Administration
- Bangladesh

Additional information
- Time zone: BST (UTC+6)

Chhera Island (Bengali: ছেঁড়া দ্বীপ, lit. 'Torn Island'; Bengali pronunciation: [tʃʰẽɽa d̪ip]) is the southernmost island of Bangladesh and an uninhabited extension of St. Martin's Island located at the mouth of the Naf River in the Bay of Bengal.

== Description ==
During high tide it is divided from St. Martin's Island by the sea. At low tide, the island can be reached by walking for about 2½ hours from St. Martin's Island.

The most popular travel mode to it is by local motorboat or tourist boat services.

Washed up corals can be found on the island's beaches. It has an area of shrub and palm tree vegetation. No permanent settlement is established on the island.

== See also ==
- Islands of the Bay of Bengal
- List of islands of Bangladesh
- Boli
