= Porer Meye =

- Genre: Drama, Suspense
- Created by: NTV
- Written by: Syed Zia Uddin
- Directed by: Habib Shakil
- Starring: Intekhab Dinar; Sadia Jahan Prova; Dilara Zaman; Mumtaheena Toya; Golam Kibria Tanvir; Shawon; Elora Gohor; Ariya Aritra; Ashraful Ashish; Golam Haider Kislu
- Country of origin: Bangladesh
- Original language: Bengali
- No. of seasons: 1
- No. of episodes: 122

Production
- Producer: Kazi Riton
- Production location: Bangladesh
- Cinematography: Nihad; Asaduzzaman Asad
- Running time: 21 Minutes

Original release
- Network: NTV
- Release: January 2020 – March 2021

Porer Meye is a Bangladeshi drama serial produced by Kazi Riton. The drama is directed by Habib Shakil and starring Intekhab Dinar, Sadia Jahan Prova, Dilara Zaman, Mumtaheena Toya, Golam Kibria Tanvir, Shawon, Elora Gohor, Ariya Aritra, Ashraful Ashish and Golam Haider Kislu. This drama serial aired on NTV from 19 January 2020 to 7 March 2021.

== Plot ==
While being a student, Najifa marries Mitul without her parents' consent. For this reason, Najifa's father disowns her. However, Najifa's mother-in-law treats Najifa as her own daughter. Najifa also respects her. In the meantime, Najifa and Mitul's daughter Ariana is born. After getting married, Najifa couldn't complete her studies. When Ariana is only six months old, Mitul gets murdered in a business conflict. Najifa starts a job for the survival of her daughter and mother-in-law. Shayan, the son of the owner of the company where Najifa works, falls in love with Najifa. But Najifa does not reciprocate.

== Cast ==
- Intekhab Dinar as Mitul
- Sadia Jahan Prova as Najifa
- Dilara Zaman as Rabea
- Mumtaheena Toya as Othoi
- Golam Kibria Tanvir as Shawon
- Shawon as Nakkhatra
- Toriqul Islam Tusher as Tusher
- Elora Gohor as Nargis
- Ariya Aritra as Ariana
- Ashraful Ashish as Wasif
- Golam Haider Kislu as Akbar Chowdhury
