= Murad Parvez =

Bangladeshi businessman (born 2000)

- Born: 3 August 1972 (age 53); Khulna, Khulna District, Bangladesh
- Occupation(s): Director, producer, writer
- Spouses: Sohana Saba (m. 2009; div. 2015)
- Children: 1

Murad Parvez is a Bangladeshi film and television director. He directed Chandragrohon, Brihonnola, and many TV serials in Bangladesh.

== Career ==
Parvez is a well-known director, producer, writer of Bangla film industry who began his career at an young age. He has directed many TV serials in Bangladesh. He earned much name and fame for directing Chandragrohon and Brihonnola. He won Bangladesh National Film Award for Best Actor for his role in the film Ghani: The Cycle (2006).

== Works ==
=== Television ===
- Smiritir Alpona Anki

=== Films ===
Year	Title	Director	Producer	Writer	Screenplay	Dialog	Editor	Notes
2008	Chandragrohon	Yes			Yes	Yes		Bangladesh National Film Awards for Best Director; Bangladesh National Film Awards for Best Screenplay; Bangladesh National Film Awards for Best Dialogue; Meril Prothom Alo Best Director Award; BCSS Best Director Award
2014	Brihonnola	Yes	Yes		Yes	Yes	Yes	Meril Prothom Alo Best Film Award A Film for Peace Un Film per la Pace Film Award
