= Dour (TV series) =

Bangladeshi drama streaming television series

- Also known as: The Race
- Bengali: দৌড়
- Genre: Thriller
- Created by: Raihan Khan
- Starring: Mosharraf Karim; Intekhab Dinar; Tariq Anam Khan; Robena Reza Jui
- Country of origin: Bangladesh
- Original language: Bengali
- No. of seasons: 1
- No. of episodes: 9

Production
- Production location: Bangladesh
- Running time: 20–30 minutes

Original release
- Network: Hoichoi
- Release: 2 May – 10 May 2022

Dour (Bengali: দৌড়) is a Bangladeshi drama streaming television series created by Raihan Khan. Starring Mosharraf Karim as a businessman in Dhaka. The series consisting of nine episodes premiered on 2 May 2022 on Hoichoi. The series made the record of the highest number of streaming on first week on the Hoichoi platform. On her Facebook account, Suborna Mustafa praised the series.

== Premise ==
The events of the web series are about a car. Prominent businessman Ruhul Amin's car was stolen. Ruhul Amin reported the matter to the police. But he did not realize that he had some confidential documents in the car that could be dangerous if they fell into the hands of the police. In the meantime, he learns from his wife that their child is missing. It is known that their child got into the trunk of the car. Now Ruhul Amin has to find the car.

== Cast ==
- Mosharraf Karim as Ruhul Amin
- Intekhab Dinar
- Tariq Anam Khan
- Robena Reza Jui as wife of Ruhul Amin
- Irfan Sajjad as car thief
- Tasnuva Tisha as car thief
- Ujjal Mahmud as car thief

== Episodes ==
Series	Episodes	Originally released
1	9	2 May 2022

=== Series 1 (2022) ===
No. overall	Episode	Directed by	Written by	Original release date
1	Matro to Shuru	Rayhan Khan	Rayhan Khan	2 May 2022
2	Shayan nei	Rayhan Khan	Rayhan Khan	3 May 2022
3	Somoy nei	Rayhan Khan	Rayhan Khan	4 May 2022
4	Otopor charjon	Rayhan Khan	Rayhan Khan	5 May 2022
5	Palabar poth nei	Rayhan Khan	Rayhan Khan	6 May 2022
6	Turuper tash	Rayhan Khan	Rayhan Khan	7 May 2022
7	Ar ekta dour	Rayhan Khan	Rayhan Khan	8 May 2022
8	Ferari Ruhul	Rayhan Khan	Rayhan Khan	9 May 2022
9	Pordar arale	Rayhan Khan	Rayhan Khan	10 May 2022

== Production ==
The shooting of the web series started in January 2022. Two days later the shooting was over. Although Rafiath Rashid Mithila was supposed to act in this series, the shooting started without her.

== Release ==
In April 2022, the official trailer for the series was released on Hoichoi's YouTube channel.
