= Mousumi Mou =

Bangladeshi presenter

- Born: Dhaka, Bangladesh
- Education: Eden Mohila College; University of Dhaka
- Occupation: Bangladeshi television presenter
- Years active: 2016–present
- Spouse: Arif Billah (m. 2014; div. 2014)

Mousumi Mou is a Bangladeshi television presenter, actress, and mime artist.

== Background ==
Mou earned her bachelor in physics from Eden Mohila College and master's in printing and publications from the University of Dhaka.

== Career ==
After completing her bachelor's, Mou joined as a part-timer in events and activation at Prothom Alo.

Mou joined Dhaka University Mime Action (DUMA). She is the director of Institute of Mime and Movement. She is the executive president of the national board of directors of Prothom Alo Bondhushava . In 2023, she won the Best Female Performer award at the 35th International University Theatre Festival 2023 in Casablanca, Morocco. In October 2024, she performed at the "Borderless Festival 2024" in Seoul, South Korea.

Mou was involved with the theatre group Prachyanat for more than one year. She made her debut on television acting in Syed Salahuddin Zaki's drama Agni Foshol. She then acted in six television dramas directed by Chayanika Chowdhury including Sir Er Meye along with Abul Hayat and Manoj Pramanik. She performed in a webfilm, Boli, on hoichoi streaming platform along with Chanchal Chowdhury.

Mou regularly hosts television programs including BTV Book Fair live programme in 2016, BTV national debate competition in 2016, the daily program Shuprobhat Bangladesh, Lux Café live, 2021 T20 Cricket World Cup, 2019 BPL cricket highlights, Cricket Mania and Cricket Extra.

== Personal life ==
Mou married Arif Billah on 23 January 2014 and divorced him in June.

== Awards ==
- Nari Shommanona Award by Kolkata-based Emon Mime Theatre
- Nari Shommanona Award by Pantomime Movement Chattogram
