= Rifat Chowdhury =

Bangladeshi poet and actor (born 1960)

- রিফাত চৌধুরী
- Born: 1960 (age 65–66); Kishoreganj, Bangladesh
- Occupations: Poet; Actor
- Years active: 1984–present
- Known for: Sixty Nine

Rifat Chowdhury (Bengali: রিফাত চৌধুরী; born 1960) is a Bangladeshi poet and television actor. A poet of the 1980s generation, he has published about 29 collections since his debut in 1984 and has appeared in more than 500 television plays over four decades. He became widely known for playing "Jatiyo Kaka" (National Uncle), also called Rifat Kaka, in Mostofa Sarwar Farooki's television serial Sixty Nine.

== Early life ==
Chowdhury was born in 1960 in Kishoreganj. He began his cultural life through literature and writing in the late 1970s and early 1980s.

== Literary career ==
Chowdhury's poetic career began with the collection Alingoner Naam ("The Name of Embrace") in 1984. He has written poetry for more than four decades, publishing around 29 collections.

His collections include Alingoner Naam (1984), Megher Protibha, Uthonto Brikkher Potro, Bodhir Bo-Dwip, Somudre Nuner Putul, Suprobhat, Surjo, Onno Mon Onno Jibon Onno Swapner Kotha, Ami Ekjon Bhougolik and Sobuj Patar Karkhana.

Chowdhury regards writing rather than acting as his primary identity and the work he finds most fulfilling. He has spoken publicly about unpaid royalties from publishers and what he sees as insufficient support for literature in Bangladesh.

== Acting career ==
Chowdhury came to acting after establishing himself as a poet, and has said he did not set out to be an actor but took it up out of financial necessity, after a friend suggested it. He made his television debut in Bijon Manush, directed by Nurul Alam Atique.

His breakthrough came with Mostofa Sarwar Farooki's serial Sixty Nine, in which he appeared under his own name as "Rifat Kaka", also known as "Jatiyo Kaka", and which brought him wide recognition with television audiences.

Over a career of about four decades he has appeared in more than 500 single-episode and serial television plays, as well as several films.

== Selected works ==
=== Films ===
- Bachelor (2004)
- Meherjaan (2011)

=== Television ===
- Bijon Manush
- Sixty Nine
- House Full
- 420
- Aim in Life
- Carrom
- Patigonit
- Bonmanush
- Bicycle
- Murir Tin

== Later years ==
Chowdhury was hospitalised in June 2021. He was admitted to Dhaka Medical College Hospital again in September 2026, his family reporting that he had been unwell for some time. He has said that if he recovers he intends to move from acting into directing television dramas, and to continue writing.
