= Masud Sezan =

Bangladeshi director

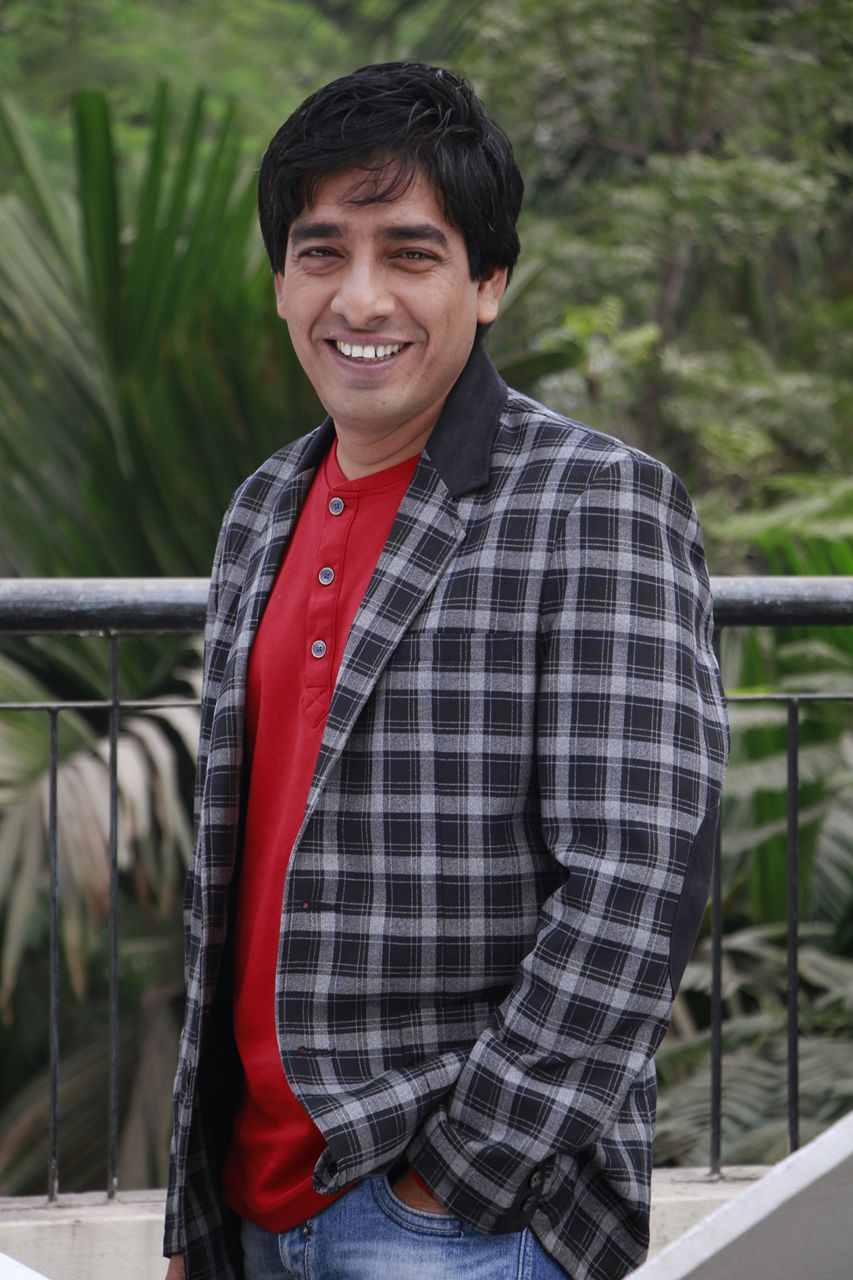
- Born: Joypurhat District

Masud Sezan is a Bangladeshi television series and telefilm director, known for some of Bangladesh's most popular series of all time including: Aim in Life, Cholitece Circus, Red Signal, and Long March. He has been a director and script writer since 2007.

== Early life ==
Sezan was born in Joypurhat District. In his childhood, he was a big movie fan and would skip school to go to the cinema. His parents found out and made him attend school. In response, Sezan planned to leave home for the nearby city of Naogaon where he could work at a restaurant during the day and watch movies at night. However, when he carried out his plan, things were not as smooth as he had imagined, and he realized how hard it was to survive without family support and returned home.

== Beginning as a director ==
Sezan became involved with drama in 1987, when the anti-autocracy movement was at its peak, writing and directing street plays as a part of the anti-autocracy revolution. In 1990, he arrived in Dhaka for higher education. Sezan is also famous as a reciter, he is the founding president of two major recitation groups: “Shwrokolpon abritti chokkro” & “Shwroshilon abritti academy”. Sezan is the founding editor of Abrittilok, the first monthly magazine on Bangladeshi recitation. He played a role as the Publishing Secretary of “Bangladesh Abritti Shomannay Parishod” [Bangladesh recital coordination council] for a period of time. He also was an active member of “Sommilito Shangskritik Jote” [Combined Cultural Alliance of Bangladesh]. Later, he became involved with group theater activity and became a member of the theater group Nattokendro.

Sezan started his professional career as a journalist, but after a time he realized that it was film and television that most appealed to him. In 2007, he made his first telefilm named Tularashi as director. Since then, he has directed many popular television series such as Aim in Life which aired for 54 episodes, and for which he received the first of his four Cultural Journalists' Forum of Bangladesh Awards (CJFB) Awards for best director.

== Philosophy ==
Sezan believes that the majority of people in society possess innate goodness. He said in an interview "There are few people who can be called purely bad" But the problem is that those few bad people are the most active ones among us, and with their evil activities they keep constantly contaminating society. Sezan wishes to awake the majority of the people who are good. He believes and wants to say to everyone that the evil can only be destroyed when goodness takes control.

== Works ==
Fiction

- Tularashi (2007)
- Late Latif (2007)
- Night Guard (2007)
- Sarfuddiner Songsher (2007)
- Mitthuk (2008)
- Poltibaj (2008)
- Otopor Tiya Pakhi Uriya Cholilo (2009)
- I am Sorry (2009)
- Vootgari (2009)
- Prothom Prem (2009)
- Bhoot Gaari (2010)
- Onukoron (2010)
- Fourth Subject (2010)
- Nijossho Shompotti (2010)
- ShongkhaTotto (2010)
- Swapno Sohochori (2010)
- Shortcut (2011)
- Sharee (2011)
- Mayajaal (2011)
- Mudra Dosh (2011)
- Mogoj Dholai (2011)
- Money is no Problem (2012)
- Mobile Court (2012)
- Na Vote (2013)
- Satya Balok (2013)
- Chiching Faak (2013)
- Hatem Ali (2013)
- The New Hatem Ali (2013)
- Kaktarua (2013)
- Bishsho Mundo Dibosh (2014)
- BCS Bangla 1st & 2nd Part (2014)
- Selfie (2015)
- Like & Comments (2015)
- Fushmontor (2015)
- Life Support (2015)
- Celebrity (2015)
- Shu-Shil (2015)
- Wow (2016)
- Postmortem (2017)

TV Serials

- Aim in Life (2008
- Patigonit (2009)
- Putul Khela (2010)
- Long March (2011)
- Red Signal (2012)
- Ekoda Ek Bagher Golay
- Haar Futiyasilo (2013)
- Shukhtan (2013)
- Formal-In (2014)
- Formal-In Plus (2014)
- Formal-In Action (2015)
- Formal-In Reaction (2015)
- Cinematic (2015)
- Money is Problem (2016)
- Wow Fantastic (2016)
- Chhotolok (2017)
- Cholitece Circus (2015)
- Love & Co. (2016)
- Manush Hoite Sabdhan (2016)
- Wow Chotolok (2016)

Running TV Serials

Dugdugi [ntv] 2017

Kheloar [banglavision] 2018

Upcoming TV Serials

Chorittro Shami [banglavision] 2018

== Awards ==
- Cultural Journalists' Forum of Bangladesh (CJFB) award best director 2008 for Aim in Life
- CJFB award best series director 2012 for Long March
- CJFB award best director 2014 for Red Signal
- CJFB award best TV director 2015

=== Special honor ===
Debate Federation Bangladesh and Bangladesh Children film Society
