= Nattokendro =

Bengali theater group

Natyakendra is a Bengali theatre group. It was formed in 1990, and led by renowned actor/director Tariq Anam Khan, Natyakendra, with its unique and distinctive plays has added a new dimension to Bangladesh theatre.

Natyakendra has been in the forefront of Bangladesh theatre, and has produced world class plays since establishment.

== Plays ==
- Bichchu (That Scoundrel Scapin) written by - Molière Directed; by - Tariq Anam Khan
- Tughlaq written by - Girish Karnad; Directed by - Tariq Anam Khan
- Sukh (Marital Bliss) written by - Abdul Monem Selim; Directed by - Tariq Anam Khan
- Jera (Interrogation) written by - Farid Kamil; Directed by - Tariq Anam Khan
- Hayavadan written by - Girish Karnad; Directed by - Touqir Ahmed
- The Crucible written by - Arthur Miller; Directed by - Tariq Anam Khan
- Aroj Choritamrito written by - Masum Reza; Directed by - Tariq Anam Khan
- Protishoron written & directed by - Tauquir Ahmed
- Projapati (The Matchmaker) written by - Thornton Wilder; Directed by - Tariq Anam Khan
- Dalimkumar written by - Subhashish Sinha; Directed by - Yusuf Hassan
- Dui Je Chhilo Ek Chakor (A Servant of Two Masters) written by - Carlo Goldoni; Directed by - Tariq Anam Khan

== Notable members ==
- Mosharraf Karim
