= Saju Muntasher =

Bangladeshi actor (born 1977)

- সাজু মুনতাসির
- Born: 1 January 1977 (age 49); Pirojpur, Bangladesh
- Other names: Muntasher Mamun
- Occupations: Producer, Actor
- Spouse: Dr. Fahima Ferdousi (Sonia)
- Website: https://www.sajumuntasher.com/

Saju Muntasher (Bengali: সাজু মুনতাসির) is a Bangladeshi actor and producer. He is the CEO of 1952 Entertainment Ltd. He was elected general secretary of Television Program Producers Association of Bangladesh in 2019.

== Early life ==
Saju Muntasher was born on 1 January 1977 in Pirojpur, Bangladesh. His father is Obaidul kabir & mother Kanij Najnin Akter.

== Career ==
He started his career as a ramp model in 1997. From 2000 to 2002 he performed as a model in various TVC. He made his acting debut in Bangla drama in 2002 directed by popular director Ahmed Yousuf Saber. Up to 2015 he has acted more than one hundred fifty dramas. Besides acting, he was the founder of Hoi Choi Production House. This production house made more than 100 single drama, telefilms & tele movies. He also produced 20 serial drama through this production house.

After that he started a new company 1952 Entertainment Ltd. and he is the CEO of the company. From this company he is producing television drama, films & non fictions events.

He was elected general secretary of Television Program Producers Association of Bangladesh in 2019.

== Personal life ==
Saju married to Fahima Ferdousi Sonia in 2017. She is a doctor by profession.

== Filmography ==
Notable Telefilm / Drama
Year	Title	Producer	Broadcast Channel	Notes
2020	Ekhane to kono bhul chilo na	Saju Muntasher	Maasranga tv	Single Drama
2020	Hamlet er phire asa	Saju Muntasher	Maasranga tv	Single Drama
2020	Golabaji	Saju Muntasher	Maasranga tv	Single Drama
2021	Mamla Man	Saju Muntasher	Maasranga tv	Single Drama
2021	Blade Laili	Saju Muntasher	Maasranga tv	Single Drama
2017	Lux Eid Drama Tumi Ami Pashapashi	Saju Muntasher		Single Drama
2018	Lovely Kothachitrro	Saju Muntasher	SA TV	Eid Episod Drama
2021	Name - 100 Te Eksho	Saju Muntasher	Maasranga tv	Mega Serial
2020	Dristir Baire	Saju Muntasher	RTV	
2021	Mamla Man	Saju Muntasher	Maasranga tv	
2021	Contract Bhai	Saju Muntasher	Channel I	
2020	Shunno Patar Chithi	Saju Muntasher	Channel I	
2020	Kutush Kutush Kathbadam	Saju Muntasher	Channel I	
2020	Babar Buker Ghran	Saju Muntasher	Channel I	
2020	Bedonar Lockdown	Saju Muntasher	Channel I	
2019	Haittam No Killai	Saju Muntasher	Asian TV	
2019	Social Media Syndrom	Saju Muntasher	Maasranga tv	
2021	Blade Laili	Saju Muntasher	Maasranga tv	
	Color	Saju Muntasher	SA TV	
	Juddho Ta Sabujer	Saju Muntasher		
2020	Dhadhar Thekeo Jotil Tumi	Saju Muntasher	Channel I	
2021	Golabaji	Saju Muntasher	Maasranga tv	
	Poncho pandob	Saju Muntasher	Deepto TV	
2021	Shornomanob 4	Saju Muntasher	NTV	
2021	Misti Mukh	Saju Muntasher	Channel I	
2020	Shornomanob 3	Saju Muntasher	NTV	
2021	Moner Vitor Mon	Saju Muntasher	Maasranga tv	
2020	Cholo Abar Palai	Saju Muntasher	Channel I	
2021	Valobasha Tobuo	Saju Muntasher	Channel I	
2021	Aktu Valo Thakar Basonay	Saju Muntasher	Channel I	
2020	Eito Ami Achi	Saju Muntasher	Maasranga tv	
2019	Aguner Maye	Saju Muntasher	Channel I	
2018	Kolur Bolod	Saju Muntasher	Channel I	
2018	Kolur Bolod 2	Saju Muntasher	Channel I	
2021	Trash Mohol	Saju Muntasher	Channel I	

== Jury Member of Program ==
- Binodon Bichitra-2011 - Photo Sundori Juri Member
- Fair and Handsome – The Ultimate Man Powered By Bangladesh NAVY 2013 Turbo Judge

== Awards ==
- TRUB Award-2021
- CJFB Performance Award-2019
- Binodon Bichitra - 2010 - Best Drama Producer
