= Srabosti Dutta Tinni =

Bangladeshi television actress and model

Shrabastee Dutta Tinni
- Born: May 17, 1983 (age 43)
- Occupations: Actress, model
- Years active: 2004-present
- Spouses: Adnan Faruque Hillol (m. 2006–2012); Adnan Saad (m. 2014–2017)
- Children: 2

Shrabastee Dutta Tinni is a Bangladeshi television actress and model. She was selected Miss Bangladesh in 2004.

== Career ==
Tinni participated in the Anondodhara Photogenic 2002 Pageant and stood fifth runner up. Then she started her ramp modeling career. In 2004 she started her acting career in the drama serial 69, created by Mostofa Sarwar Farooki.

Before moving to Canada in 2017, she acted in a one-hour play titled Ekti Nil Kuashar Mrittyu, directed by Parvez Amin which was her last appearance on television so far.

== Works ==
=== Television ===
Year	Drama	Playwright & Director	Notes
2004	69		
2005	Chhoker Baire		
	Swapner Nil Pori	Chayanika Chowdhury	
2005	Romjier Ayna	Shihab Shaheen	
	Opekkha		
	Shukher Asukh		
2007	Kobi Bolechen	Iftekhar Ahmed Fahmi	
2006	Doyita		
2006	Shei Tumi		
2008	Jege Theko		
2008	Aim in Life		
	Kagojer Ghor		
2010	Bhalobashar Shuru	Chayanika Chowdhury	
2010	Sayanhey	Chayanika Chowdhury	
2010	Chokshe Aamar Trishna	Chayanika Chowdhury	
2010	Lilaboti		
2010	Aloker Ei Jhornadhara	Chayanika Chowdhury	
	Bow		
	Nikhoj		
	Bhalobashi Tomakei		
	Tumi Amar Ahonkar		
	Brishti Tomake Dilam		
	Ek Jiboner Bosonto		
	Dengur Dingulite Prem		
2013	Ei Maya	Chayanika Chowdhury	
2013	Nil Kuashai		
	Tomay Dilam Perithibi		
	Golapi Rong Shari	Masud Mohiuddin	

=== Films ===
Year	Film	Notes
2007	Made in Bangladesh	
2012	Se Amar Mon Kereche	

== Personal life ==
Tinni was first married to actor Adnan Faruque Hillol since 28 December 2006 for two years. Together they have a daughter Warisha. After the divorce, she married Adnan Huda Saad on 18 February 2014. She has another daughter with him named Arisha. This marriage also ended up in divorce by 2017.

In an interview in July 2017, Tinni mentioned about her drug addiction and the following long-term rehabilitation. She currently resides in Montreal, Canada with her daughter Warisha.
