= Sohana Saba =

Bangladeshi actress

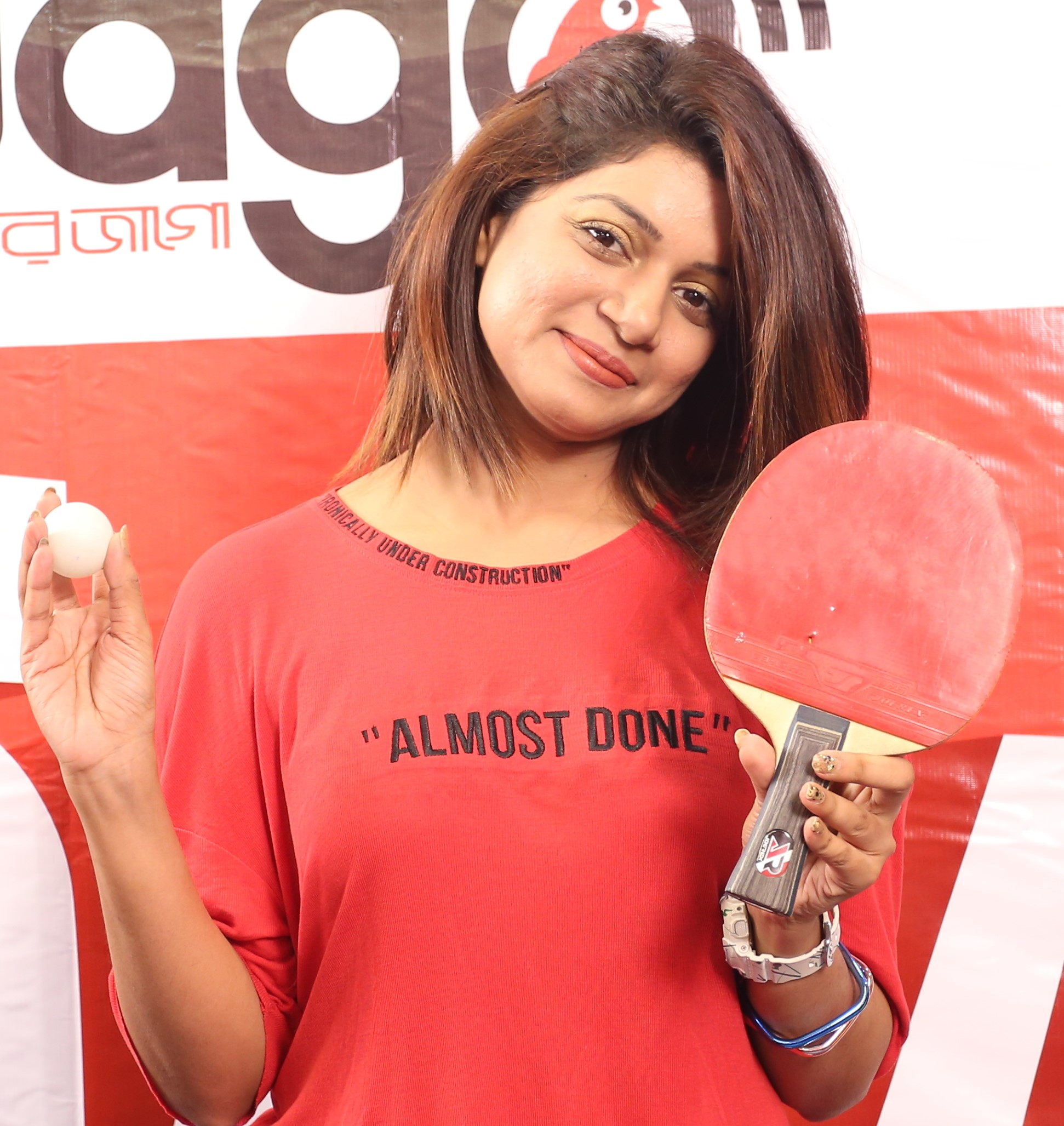
- Saba in 2018
- Born: 12 October 1986 (age 39)
- Occupation: Actress
- Years active: 2006–present
- Spouse: Faisal Samad (m. 2025)
- Children: 1

Sohana Saba (born 12 October 1986) is a Bangladeshi actress, producer, and screenwriter. She is the recipient of Meril Prothom Alo Awards for her debut film Ayna.

== Early life and education ==
Saba was born and brought up in Dhaka. Sohana Saba completed her SSC and HSC from University Laboratory School and College and Women's college respectively. Afterwards, she completed her bachelor's degree in fashion designing from Shanto-Mariam University of Creative Technology.

== Career ==
Saba is a trained classical dancer from Bulbul Lalitokola Academy and Chayanaut. Her career started as a dancer and eventually entered into TV commercial and drama.

She debuted in film acting by her role in the film Ayna, directed by Kabori Sarwar. She acted in many notable movies which received positive responses namely Khelaghor', Priyotomeshu', Brihonnala, Chandragrohon, etc. She also acted in few Kolkata movies and gained popularity there. Saba is always focusing on doing something different through her acting hence very selective about her work.

She has launched her own production house, Khamarbari, and already produced her very first production Twin Returns for binge.

In 2021, she acted on television series Boli directed by Shankha Dashgupta.

In February 2024, Saba purchased nomination papers from Bangladesh Awami League for the seats reserved for women in Jatiya Sangsad for the Dhaka Division. Following the fall of the Sheikh Hasina-led Awami League government, the Detective Branch detained her for questioning.

During the movement, a group of pro-autocracy Awami artists, including Sohana Saba, were active against the movement in a WhatsApp group called 'Alo Ashbei' led by actor Ferdous. After the non-cooperation movement, on September 3, 2024, some screenshots related to that WhatsApp group were spread on social media.

In April 2025, a murder case was filed against Saba and 16 other actors over the death of a protester in Vatara during the Anti-Discrimination Student Movement against the Awami League government led by Prime Minister Sheikh Hasina.

== Personal life ==
Saba was first married to film producer Murad Hasan for 10 years, which ended in divorce. Subsequently, she went into a relationship with businessman Faisal Samad in 2021 and married him in 2025. Faisal is the owner of Savartex Group and a director of the BGMEA.

== Filmography ==
Year	Film	Role	Notes	Ref.
2006	Ayna	Ayna	Debut film; Meril Prothom Alo Awards — Best Film Actress	
2006	Khelaghor: Dollhouse	Rehana		
2008	Chandragrohon	Falani		
2009	Priyotomeshu			
2014	Brihonnola	Durga	Jaipur Film Festival Award — Best Film Actress	
2016	Shororipu	Raka Chowdhury		
2019	Abbas	Chutki		
2023	Ashomvob			

=== Web series ===
- Boli (2021)
