= Mozeza Ashraf Monalisa =

Bangladeshi actress, model and dancer

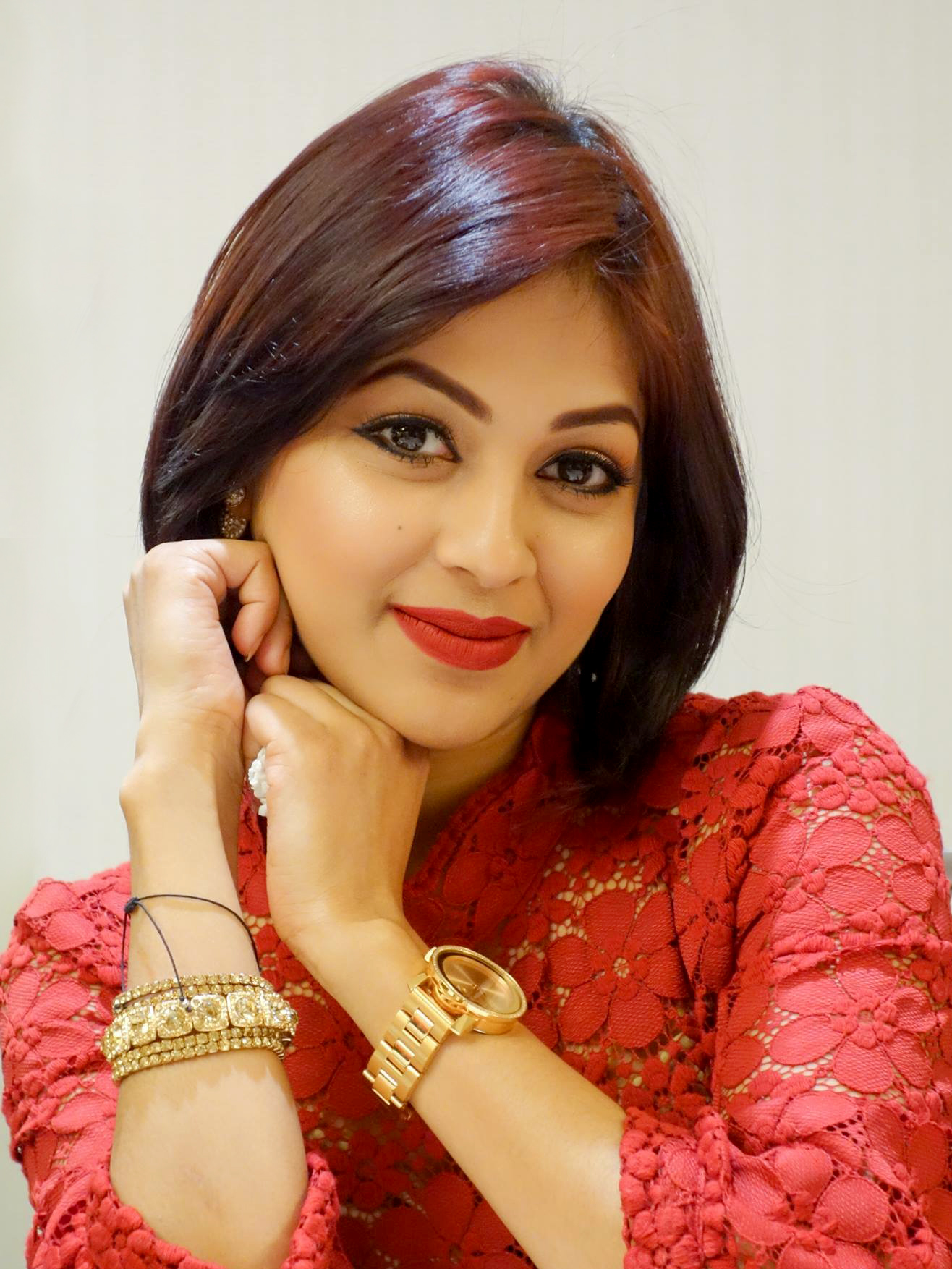
- Monalisa in 2016
- Born: 5 October 1984 (age 42); Dhaka, Bangladesh
- Occupations: Actress, model, dancer
- Years active: 1997 - present
- Spouses: Faiaz Sharif (m. 2012; div. 2014)

Mozeza Ashraf Monalisa (born October 5, 1984; known as Monalisa) is a retired Bangladeshi actress, model and dancer. She started her career by appearing in television commercials and stage dancing. She subsequently won Miss Photogenic 2000. She played in several television series and telefilms and is a trained dancer.

== Career ==
Monalisa started acting, stage dancing and modeling at age 10. Beginning as a dancer, Monalisa became popular for her appearances in television commercials. She later acted in television plays including Boyosh Jokhon Ekhush, Kagojer Phool and Humayun Ahmed's Trishna. Among many other brands, Monalisa is the brand ambassador of BanglaLink Telecommunication.

== Personal life ==
Monalisa married Faiyaaz Sharif on 12 December 2012. Sharif is a non-resident Bangladeshi businessman living in the United States. The couple then moved New York, and ended up in divorce in 2014.

As of August 2018, Monalisa has been residing in the United States where she works as a beauty adviser in Sephora. Previously, she worked at MAC Cosmetics and KIKO Milano.

== Television ==
- Baazi (2011)
- Ektu Bhalobasha (2011)
- Bandulum (2011)
- Romeora (2011)
- All Rounder (2011)
- Bhalo Theko Ful Mishti Bokul (2011)
- Champakoli (2012)
- Sikander Box Ekhon Birat Model (2012)
- Average Aslam (2016)
- Kid Solaiman (2016)
- Chirkutt (2016)
- Mr.Perfectionist (2016)
- Antorjatik Mama (2016)
- Finix Fly (2016)
- Ami Tumi O She (2016)

== Awards ==
- Miss Photogenic 2000 Bangladesh
- BIMA Award UK
- Channel i Performance Award
- Meril Prothom Alo Awards (2002)
- Dhallywood Award USA
- Bangladesh Reporters' Association Award
