= Sumaiya Shimu =

Bangladeshi model and television actress

- সুমাইয়া শিমু
- Shimu in 2026
- Born: Sumaiya Rahaman Shimul; 30 April 1980 (age 46); Narail, Bangladesh
- Education: Jahangirnagar University
- Occupations: Actress; model
- Years active: 1999–present
- Spouse: Nazrul Islam (m. 2015)
- Awards: Meril Prothom Alo Awards

Sumaiya Rahaman Shimul (known as Sumaiya Shimu; born 30 April 1980) is a Bangladeshi model, television actress and social activist. She has been acting on television dramas since 1999. She is the founder and chairman of a non-profit organization named 'Better Future for Women'.

== Early life and education ==
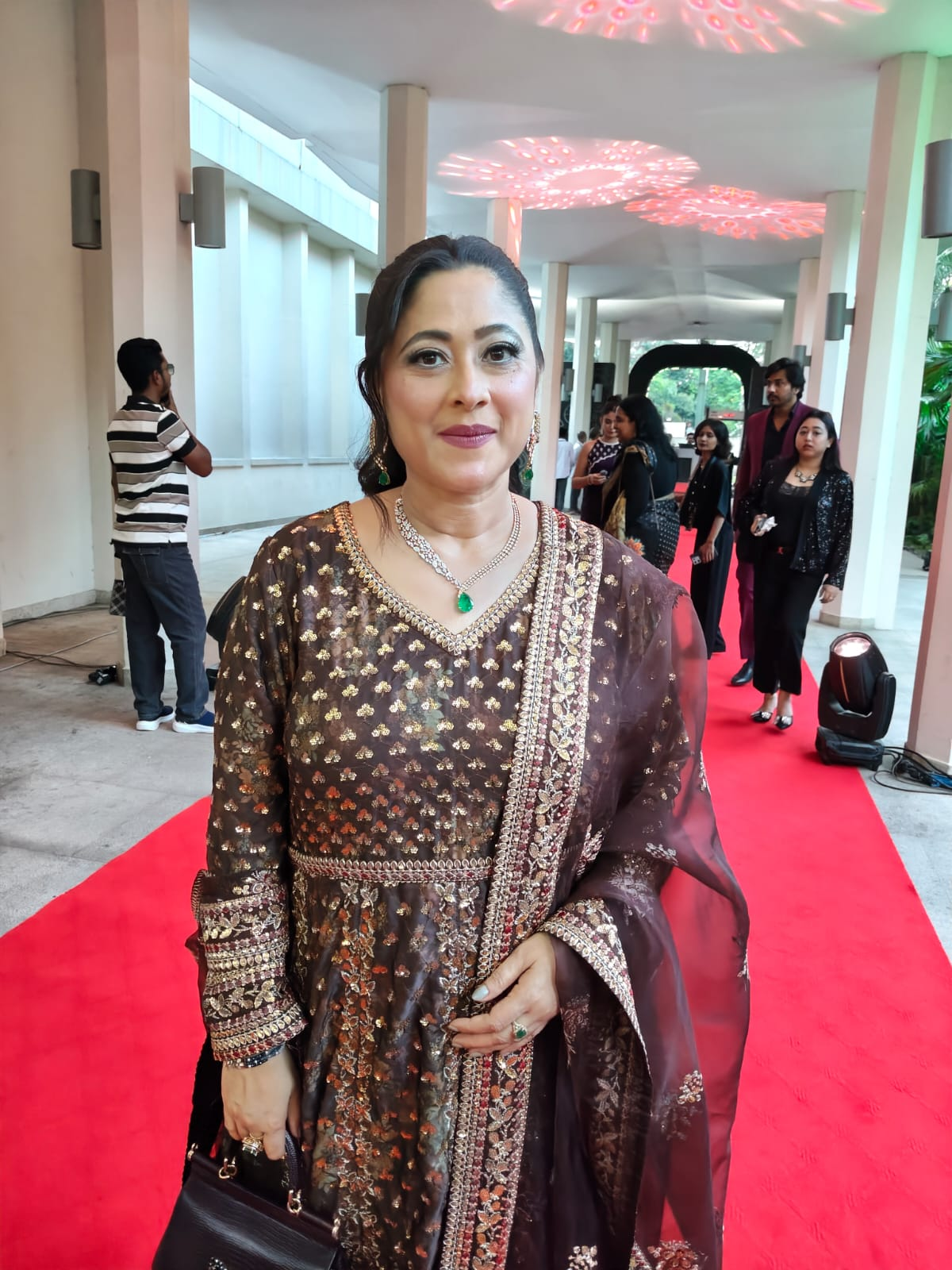
Sumaiya Shimu, 2026

Shimu was born on 30 April 1980 in Narail, and completed her early education in Khulna and Dhaka. She earned a Bachelor of Social Science and a Master of Social Science in Government and Politics from Jahangirnagar University. In 2017, she completed her PhD from the same university, with her research focusing on "The Artistic and Socio-Economic Perspective of Women in Acting" in the Department of Drama and Dramatics.

== Career ==
=== Audiovisual media ===
Shimu made her television debut in 1999 with the drama Ekhane Ator Paoa Jai. She gained widespread recognition in 2008 for her performance in the drama Shopno Chura, which garnered significant audience attention. Her role in the drama earned her the Meril Prothom Alo Award for Best TV Actress (Popular) in 2008. Shimu first came into the public spotlight as a model in a TV commercial for Lever Brothers, shot in Bombay in 1999. Her popularity increased further with her appearances in Euro Orange TV commercials. In recent years, she has appeared in commercials for Square Toiletries and Nestle Bangladesh. She has made only one film appearance, in Bachelor. She marked her debut on the OTT platform through "Besura", which was the final episode of "Dui Shaw", directed by Nuhash Humayun.

=== Activism ===
In 2019, Shimu founded the non-profit foundation Better Future for Women (BFW), providing educational opportunities, skill-building programs, and entrepreneurship development.

In 2017, Shimu was appointed as a Goodwill Ambassador for Relief International, where she raised awareness about the Rohingya refugee crisis and helped secure critical funding for the organization's operations in Bangladesh.

== Personal life ==
On August 28, 2015, Shimu married Nazrul Islam, the then Bangladesh Country Director of Relief International, a USA based international non-governmental organization. On 8 November 2023, she gave birth to twin boys in a private hospital in Dhaka.

== Works ==
Films

- Bachelor (2004)

Television dramas

- House full
- Sonalu Phul
- Projapoti Mon
- Chhokka (2011)
- Teen Jonaki (2012)
- Lake Drive Lane (2015)
- Briefcase (2015)
- Protarok Priyodorshini (2015)

== Awards and nominations ==
Meril-Prothom Alo Awards

Year	Category	Television	Result	Ref.(s)
2007	Best TV Actress	Shopnochura	Nominated	
2008	Best TV Actress	Shopnochura	Won	
2009	Best TV Actress	Lolita	Nominated	
2010	Best TV Actress	Lolita	Nominated	
2011	Best TV Actress	Lolita	Nominated	
2012	Best TV Actress	Radio Chocolate	Nominated	
2013	Best TV Actress	Radio Chocolate Reloded	Nominated	
