= NTV (Bangladeshi TV channel) =

Bangladeshi television channel

- Country: Bangladesh
- Broadcast area: Worldwide
- Headquarters: Karwan Bazar, Dhaka, Bangladesh

Programming
- Language: Bengali
- Picture format: 16:9 1080i HDTV (downscaled to 16:9 576i for SDTV sets)

Ownership
- Owner: International Television Channel Ltd.
- Sister channels: RTV (formerly)

History
- Launched: 3 July 2003; 23 years ago

Links
- Website: www.ntvbd.com

NTV

YouTube information
- Channel: NTV News
- Subscribers: 8.57 million
- Last updated: 2 May 2026

NTV (Bengali: এনটিভি), styled in lower case as ntv, an acronym of less commonly used National Television, is a Bangladeshi Bengali-language satellite and cable television channel based in the BSEC Building in Karwan Bazar, Dhaka. It was launched on 2 July 2003, and is one of Bangladesh's most popular television channels. NTV is owned by International Television Channel Limited, with Mosaddek Ali Falu, a businessman and former vice president of the Bangladesh Nationalist Party, being the channel's chairman.

== History ==
=== Initiation and launch ===
NTV was originally licensed to Sajjat Ali on 19 September 1999. The channel was originally licensed as "Ten TV" prior to its acquisition by Mosaddek Ali on 10 January 2003. Exactly a month later, on 10 February 2003, NTV was announced to set operations in April of that year, as Bangladesh's previous privately owned television channel, Ekushey Television was shut down in 2002. It had also announced a partnership with CNN.

The channel was also set to be receivable in the entirety of Bangladesh, as well as the rest of Asia and Australia, and parts of Africa and Europe. Ahead of launch, it had become the first Bangladeshi channel to use real-time graphics per an agreement signed with Beehive Systems to provide the isle'wiz software.

However, its official broadcasts started on 3 July 2003. Prior to this, it initiated test transmissions for a week. The launch night special and the channel's graphics were compared to Ekushey Television by a Daily Star columnist; moreover, the director of the opening ceremony of the channel, Hanif Sanket, had done the same for ETV three years earlier.

Initially broadcasting for eight hours a day, NTV began broadcasting on a full-day basis on 1 January 2004, enabling the channel to start airing more news bulletins. In the same year, Falu bought NTV and pushed its license approval further. NTV had received investment from Soundview Broadcasting owned by Shafqat Chowdhury, a Pakistani-American businessman.

=== Later years ===
On 26 February 2007, a massive fire took place at the BSEC building in Karwan Bazar, killing three people and injuring over a hundred. As a result, both NTV and its sister, RTV, temporarily ceased operations and forced the channel to broadcast reruns after resuming broadcasts. They worked with Banglavision to broadcast their news onto NTV since they were unable to do their own.

In September 2011, NTV became the first television channel in Bangladesh to receive an ISO certificate for its contribution to its broadcast management. Mike Bloise handed it to the channel's chairman, Falu. In December 2012, the Intelligence Bureau of India flagged NTV as a "hate channel" allegedly broadcasting anti-India programming. It was one of the twenty-four "illegal" channels to have been flagged. On 31 October 2014, another fire broke out in the BSEC building at 11:48 in the morning, which once again led to the closure of both NTV and RTV. NTV resumed transmissions later on that day.

In November 2015, NTV was among the channels asked by the information ministry about smoking scenes found in their television series. In 2016, Falu resigned from the Bangladesh Nationalist Party as vice chairman. NTV was one of the nine Bangladeshi television channels to sign an agreement with Bdnews24.com to subscribe to a video-based news agency run by children called Prism in May 2016. NTV aired the Miss World Bangladesh pageant in 2017. In December 2018, NTV began broadcasting using the Bangabandhu-1 satellite. On 26 February 2019, the second anime series of Chibi Maruko-chan, dubbed in Bengali, premiered on NTV.

NTV commenced official high-definition broadcasts on 21 February 2025, coinciding International Mother Language Day.

== Related services ==
=== NTV Europe ===
In August 2006, the United Kingdom-based NTV Europe was launched and targeted the Bangladeshi community throughout Europe on Sky channel 826, but stopped broadcasting a year later. NTV Europe was relaunched on Sky channel 834 in the United Kingdom in August 2008. On 14 April 2012, NTV Europe was replaced by Channel 9 on Sky channel 834. However, NTV Europe started broadcasting on Sky channel 852 sixteen days later., but due to a reshuffle, it moved to channel 838 on 19 August 2014.

On 1 May 2018, as a part of another reshuffle, NTV Europe moved to Sky channel 757 due to the fact that the International genre had started to begin at channel 701. NTV's old slot was used for Lifetime. It was moved again to channel 780 due to Sky's reshuffle of its international section by language in 2019.

== Programming ==
NTV's programming is diverse and consists of news coverage, soap operas, edutainment, religious, and political programs.

=== Cooking ===
Year	Shows	Director	Cast	Host	Notes	Ref.
2004–2012	Siddika Kabir's Recipe	Sara Jaker and Abdullah Rana	Professor Siddika Kabir	Sharmin Nahar, Sharmin Lucky		
2014–2015	Food Caravan	Abu Raihan Juwel	Afifa Akhtar Lita	Pinky Chetri		
2016–2017	Today's Kitchen	Abu Raihan Juwel	Jubaida Rahman	Jubaida Rahman		
2019–present	Expert Today's Kitchen	Kazi Mohammed Mostafa	Daily Chefs	Neel Hurerjahan and Nurat		

=== Drama serials ===
Year	Title	Director	Notes	Ref.
2004–2005	Kacher Manush	Afsana Mimi & Amlan Biswas		
2004	Ronger Manush	Salahuddin Lavlu		
2006	Labonno Prova	Taher Shipon & Akram Khan		
2006–2007	Romijer Ayna	Shihab Shaheen		
2007–2008	111: A Nelson Number	Nayeem Imtiaz Neyamul		
2008–2009	Aim in Life	Masud Sezan		
2008–2009	House Full	Redoan Rony		
2010	FnF	Redoan Rony		
2010–2011	Graduate	Mohammad Mostafa Kamal Raz		
2011	Kache Ashar Golpo	Iftekhar Ahmed Fahmi	Season 1; short film series by Close-Up	
2011	Behind The Scene	Redoan Rony		
2017	Post Graduate	Mohammad Mostafa Kamal Raz		
2017–2018	Golpogulo Amader	Mizanur Rahman Aryan		
2018–2019	Maya Mosnod	S M Salauddin		
2019	Behind The Puppy	Redoan Rony		
2019–2020	Shohorali	Ejaj Munna		
2020–2021	Porer Meye	Habib Shakil		
2019–2021	Family Crisis	Mohammad Mostafa Kamal Raz		
2021–2022	Friendbook	Goutam Koiri		
2021–2022	Joint Family	Rahat Mazumdar		
2021	Mehman	Al Hazen		
2022	Family Friends	Habib Shakil		
2024–2025	Jonakir Alo	Musafir Rony		
2025–2026	Kajins	Golam Muktadir		
2026	Ghore Baire	Musafir Rony		

=== Reality ===
- CloseUp1 (2005–2012)
- Konka Shera Poribar
- Tiffin er faake
- Ha-Show
- Secret Beauty Expert

=== Talk shows ===
- Ntv er nimontrone
- Aaj Dupure
- Shuvo Shondha
- Joyitar Joyjatra
- Ki Kotha Tahar Sathe
- Muktangon
- Shomporko

=== Quiz shows ===
- Fame and Fortune
- Shomoshomoy

=== Acquired programming ===
==== Animated ====
- Chibi Maruko-chan

==== Drama ====
- Kuruluş: Osman
- Marumo no Okite

== See also ==
- List of television stations in Bangladesh
