= Maasranga Television =

Maasranga Television মাছরাঙা টেলিভিশন
- Country: Bangladesh
- Broadcast area: Nationwide
- Headquarters: Bir Uttom Ziaur Rahman Road, Banani, Dhaka

Programming
- Language: Bengali
- Picture format: 1080i HDTV (downscaled to 16:9 576i for SDTV sets)

Ownership
- Owner: Square Group

History
- Launched: 30 July 2011; 15 years ago

Links
- Website: www.maasranga.tv

Maasranga Television (Bengali: মাছরাঙা টেলিভিশন; lit. 'Kingfisher Television') is a Bangladeshi Bengali-language satellite and cable television channel owned by the Square Group. It commenced broadcasts on 30 July 2011, and is based in Bir Uttom Ziaur Rahman Road, Dhaka. Maasranga is the first high-definition television channel in Bangladesh, and has a diverse range of programming ranging from drama series, news, to animated series.

== History ==
Maasranga Television received its broadcasting license from the Bangladesh Telecommunication Regulatory Commission, along with several other privately owned Bangladeshi television channels, on 20 October 2009. The channel commenced official transmissions on 30 July 2011, with the "Rangati Elo Machranga" (রাঙাতে এল মাছরাঙা; lit. 'Kingfisher came to color') slogan. Maasranga is the first television channel in Bangladesh to broadcast on high-definition television.

In July 2015, in observance of Eid al-Fitr, Maasranga began airing Nickelodeon India's Motu Patlu. The channel later added more Indian animated programming such as Chacha Bhatija, Gattu Battu, and ViR: The Robot Boy. On 15 August 2015, coinciding the 40th death anniversary of the founding father of Bangladesh, Sheikh Mujibur Rahman, Maasranga aired a special musical program titled Bangabandhu Ke Niye. In November 2015, Maasranga was among the channels asked by the information ministry about smoking scenes found in their television series. Along with Bangladesh Television and GTV, Maasranga Television broadcast the 2016 Asia Cup for Bangladeshi audiences.

Maasranga began reairing The Adventures of Sinbad in Bangladesh on 1 January 2017, which was also formerly broadcast by Bangladesh Television. The channel also began airing the Turkish television series Diriliş: Ertuğrul on 2 April 2017. It was one of the broadcasters of the 2018 FIFA World Cup in the country. Maasranga began airing Hercules: The Legendary Journeys on 10 February 2019. The 2018 supernatural thriller film Debi had its world television premiere on Maasranga twice on 13 and 14 February 2019. In December 2019, Maasranga, along with three other Bangladeshi television channels, signed an agreement with UNICEF to air programming regarding children's issues.

On 13 October 2026, the official Instagram account of Maasranga Television was hacked by unknown individuals who used it to post deepfake pornographic videos of actresses Pori Moni and Mehazabien Chowdhury. The videos were removed following the account's recovery, and Rumor Scanner Bangladesh confirmed that the posts were faked using AI-powered face-swapping technology. Chowdhury later criticised the use of artificial intelligence to create fabricated content, also questioning humiliating another individual for online profit. Pori Moni criticised Maasranga for its cybersecurity failures and accused the channel of 'decimating' her career.

== Programming ==
=== Acquired ===
==== Animated ====
- Chacha Bhatija
- Gattu Battu
- Motu Patlu
- Rudra: Boom Chik Chik Boom
- Shiva
- ViR: The Robot Boy

==== Live-action ====
- Diriliş: Ertuğrul
- Hercules: The Legendary Journeys
- The Adventures of Sinbad
- The Sword of Tipu Sultan

=== Drama ===
- Apurba
- Home Theatre
- Housewives
- Mamlabaz
- Nogor Alo
- Poron Kotha
- Tin Goyenda

=== News and current affairs ===
- Khelar Mathey
- Maasranga English News
- Maasranga Sangbad
- Maasranga Shamprotik
- Prime Time Maasranga News

=== Reality ===
- Magic Bauliana
- Shera Radhuni
