= Shomporker Golpo =

2026 Bangladeshi television film

- Official YouTube film poster of Somporker Golpo
- Also known as: Shomporker Golpo
- Genre: Family drama
- Created by: Mohammad Mostafa Kamal Raz
- Written by: Siddiq Ahmed
- Screenplay by: Siddiq Ahmed
- Story by: Siddiq Ahmed
- Directed by: Mohammad Mostafa Kamal Raz
- Starring: Farhan Ahmed Jovan; Tanjim Saiyara Totini
- Music by: Arfin Rumi and Keya; Lyrics by Tarik Tuhin
- Composer: Arfin Rumi
- Country of origin: Bangladesh
- Original language: Bengali

Production
- Running time: 112 minutes
- Production companies: Rin Bangladesh; Cinemawala

Original release
- Release: January 10, 2026

Shomporker Golpo (Bengali: সম্পর্কের গল্প) is a Bangladeshi Bengali-language television drama film that premiered on YouTube on 10 January 2026. The film was directed and produced by Mohammad Mostafa Kamal Raz and written by Siddiq Ahmed. It features Farhan Ahmed Jovan and Tanjim Saiyara Totini in the lead roles.

It is 3rd instalment of "Golpo" series, the previous instalments are Tomader Golpo (2025) and Eta Amaderi Golpo (2025 tv serial) which are directed by Mohammad Mostafa Kamal Raz. The drama presents a narrative centered on family relationships, emotional conflicts, and reconciliation within a contemporary social context in Bangladesh.

== Plot ==
Somporker Golpo follows the interconnected lives of several family members as they experience misunderstandings, emotional distance, and reconciliation. The story explores themes of familial responsibility, emotional attachment, and forgiveness, emphasizing the significance of maintaining strong interpersonal bonds in modern society.

== Cast ==
- Farhan Ahmed Jovan as Iqbal
- Tanjim Saiyara Totini as Sara
- Dilara Zaman as Dadi
- Nader Chowdhury as Jahir
  - Gm Masud as Young Jahir
- Monira Mithu as Shanta
  - Zarin Nudar Ava as Young Shanta
- Mahmudul Islam Mithu as Shimul
  - AB Rokon as Young Shimul
- Deepa Khandakar as Kanta
  - Aditi Zaman Sneha as Young Kanta
- Sohel Khan as Rahman
- Sheikh Swapna
- MNU Raju as Kallu
- Nowshin Disha as Sabiya
- Otithi Israt as Ira

== Production ==
The film was produced by the Bangladeshi production company Cinemawala. Cinematography was handled by Sumon Hossain, while editing was done by Rashed Rabbi. The music was composed by Arfin Rumey, with lyrics written by Tarik Tuhin and vocals performed by Arfin Rumey and Kheya.

== Release ==
Somporker Golpo was released on the Cinemawala YouTube channel on 10 January 2026. The release was reported by several Bangladeshi news outlets prior to its premiere. It also released on Amazon Prime Video.

== Reception ==
Following its release, the drama film garnered significant online attention, with Bangladeshi media praising its focus on emotional and social relationships. The production received significant engagement online, generating over 27,000 comments on YouTube. Reported by Bdnews24, the drama sparked widespread discussions across Bengali entertainment groups on Facebook, where viewers particularly noted the emotional impact of its final scenes.

Bangla Tribune reported, the film achieved significant viewership, accumulating 10 million views and over 22,000 comments on YouTube within three days of its release. The film resonated with audiences due to its emotional portrayal of relationship dynamics and familial conflicts.

Reported by Jagonews24 highlighted that, Monira Mithu's performance for its strong emotional impact on audiences. The film's other cast members including, Tanjim Saiyara Totini, Farhan Ahmed Jovan, and Dilara Zaman also received positive reviews. Additionally, viewers praised Siddique Ahmed's screenplay, Arfin Rumey's musical score and background music for enhancing the story's emotional depth, and Sumon Hossain's cinematography.

A review by Prothom Alo noted that, the two-hour fiction sensitively explores emotional subtleties and relationship complexities, centering on a mother-daughter dynamic. The performances of Tanjim Saiyara Totini and Monira Mithu were praised for effectively conveying the narrative's underlying themes of grief, pride and familial love.

Channel i noted that, Farhan Ahmed Jovan and Tanjim Saiyara Totini received widespread praise for their performances in the drama film, which marked a significant success.
