= Tomader Golpo =

2025 Bangladeshi television film

- Poster
- Bengali: তোমাদের গল্প
- Literally: Your Story
- Directed by: Mohammad Mostafa Kamal Raz
- Screenplay by: Siddiq Ahmed
- Produced by: Mohammad Mostafa Kamal Raz
- Starring: Farhan Ahmed Jovan; Tanjim Saiyara Totini; Dilara Zaman; Saberi Alam
- Cinematography: Sumon Hossain
- Edited by: Rashed Rabbi
- Music by: Arfin Rumey
- Production company: CINEMAWALA
- Distributed by: CINEMAWALA
- Release date: 31 March 2025
- Country: Bangladesh
- Language: Bengali

Tomader Golpo (Bengali: তোমাদের গল্প, lit. 'Your Story') is a 2025 Bangladeshi romantic comedy television film produced and directed by Mohammad Mostafa Kamal Raz under the banner of CINEMAWALA. The film stars Farhan Ahmed Jovan and Tanjim Saiyara Totini in the lead role alongside Dilara Zaman, Saberi Alam, Shilpi Sharkar Apu, Monira Mithu, Nader Chowdhury, Mahmudul Islam Mithu and others in the supporting role.

The film was shot in Narsingdi and the screenplay written by Siddiq Ahmed and cinematography by Sumon Hossain. The music of the film was composed and sung by Arfin Rumey and lyrics by Jonny Haque. It is released on CINEMAWALA YouTube channel in Eid al-Fitr of 2025.

== Cast ==
- Farhan Ahmed Jovan as Ratul
- Tanjim Saiyara Totini as Shalu
- Dilara Zaman as Dadi
- Saberi Alam as Ratul's mother
- Shilpi Sharkar Apu as Boro Chachi
- Monira Mithu as Nahida, Chutu chachi
- Nader Chowdhury as Rafiq
- Mahmudul Islam Mithu as Boro Chacha
- MNU Raju as Rokib
- Ruzlan Ayaat as Rontu
- Somu Chowdhury as Ramij's friend

== Reception ==
=== Audience reception ===
It is released on the Cinemawala YouTube channel during Eid al-Fitr, the family drama Tomader Golpo, achieved significant viewership. According to a report by Prothom Alo, the "YouTube film" quickly went viral, surpassing 12.5 million views within 16 days of its release and eventually accumulating around 35 million views. The production received critical acclaim from audiences, particularly for its emotional storyline, performances, and direction. The film Tomader Golpo quickly began trending on the YouTube. The Daily Star reported that, the narrative focuses on the strong relationships within joint families, noting that the production accumulated over 5 million views within four days of its release.

Wroted by Jamuna TV's survey, The film received widespread appreciation from both domestic and international audiences, who expressed their positive feedback in the YouTube comments section. Wroted by Dhaka Mail's survey, Tomader Golpo stood out among the various Eid-ul-Fitr releases for its deeply emotional narrative, which left many viewers moved to tears in contrast to other humorous or nostalgic productions. A survey by Shomoyer Alo highlighted that, YouTube dramas achieved significant viewership throughout 2025 alongside television broadcasts, frequently trending due to their diverse storylines, realistic portrayals, and popular casts. Among these notable productions, Mostafa Kamal Raz's Tomader Golpo received an overwhelmingly positive response from the audience.

== Accolades ==
The film won multiple awards at the 26th Meril-Prothom Alo Awards in 2026.

Year	Award	Category	Artist	Result	Ref.
2026	Dhallywood Film and Music Awards	Best TV Actor	Farhan Ahmed Jovan	Won	
2026	Dhallywood Film and Music Awards	Best TV Actress	Tanjim Saiyara Totini	Won	
2026	Dhallywood Film and Music Awards	Best TV Director	Mohammad Mostafa Kamal Raz	Won	
2026	Meril-Prothom Alo Awards	Best TV Actor	Farhan Ahmed Jovan	Won	
2026	Meril-Prothom Alo Awards	Best TV Director	Mohammad Mostafa Kamal Raz	Won	
2026	Meril-Prothom Alo Awards	Best Screenplay	Siddiq Ahmed	Won	
2026	Meril-Prothom Alo Awards	Best TV Actress	Tanjim Saiyara Totini	Nominated	

== Sequel ==
The sequel of the drama film Tomader Golpo 2 are released on Eid al-Adha 28 May 2026 on Channel i and Cinemawala.
