= Ahmed Zaman Chowdhury =

Bangladeshi film journalist, screenwriter and lyricist

- আহমদ জামান চৌধুরী
- Born: 28 December 1947; Chandpur, East Bengal, Dominion of Pakistan
- Died: 6 March 2013 (aged 65); Dhaka, Bangladesh
- Other names: A. Z. Chow, Khoka
- Citizenship: Bangladeshi

Ahmed Zaman Chowdhury (28 December 1947 – 6 March 2013) was a Bangladeshi film journalist, screenwriter and lyricist. He won the Bangladesh National Film Award for Best Screenplay for the film Jadur Banshi (1977). Besides, he won Bachsas Award and Fazlul Haq Memorial Award.

== Early life and career ==
Chowdhury completed his bachelor's degree in sociology from the University of Dhaka. While he was a student, he took up a part-time job at the weekly film magazine Chitrali of which he later went on to become the editor. Chowdhury gave up teaching at the University of Dhaka.

Chowdhury wrote screenplays, dialogues, and stories films including Peech-dhala Poth, Notun Naame Dako, Naacher Putul, Baadi Theke Begum, Aagun, Jadur Bashi, Mastaan, Tufaan, Durdesh, Miss Lanka and Love in Singapore.

In later life, Chowdhury emerged as a playwright of the drama plays - Amar Okal Basanta, Kemon Achho Tumi, Onno Rokom Chor, Prescription, Poth Jana Nai and Shaat Konnya. He taught at Stamford University's Film and Media Department.

Chowdhury served as the president of Bangladesh Chalachitra Shangbadik Shomitee (BACHSAS) for three terms.

== Personal life ==
He is the younger brother of writer and translator Fakhruzzaman Chowdhury. His sister-in-law Dilara Zaman is an actress.

== Filmography ==
- Pitch Dhala Poth (1970)
- Nacher Putul (1971)
- Bandi Theke Begum (1976)
- Shesh Uttar (1977)
- Door Desh (1983)
- Miss Lanka (1985)
- Rakkhushi (2004)
