= Roktojoba =

- Poster
- Directed by: Niamul Mukta
- Screenplay by: Muhammad Tasneemul Hasan
- Story by: Muhammad Tasneemul Hasan
- Produced by: Faridur Reza Sagor Abu Shahed Emon
- Starring: Sariful Razz; Nusrat Imrose Tisha; Lutfur Rahman George; Shilpi Sharkar Apu
- Cinematography: Barkat Hossain Polash
- Edited by: Niamul Mukta; Asaduzzaman Abir
- Music by: Shohag Chakraborty; Zahin Rasid
- Production companies: Chilekotha Films; Impress Telefilm
- Distributed by: Channel i
- Release date: 29 June 2023
- Country: Bangladesh
- Language: Bengali

Roktojoba is a 2023 Bangladeshi drama film directed by Niamul Mukta and story, screenplay and dialogue are written by Muhammad Tasneemul Hasan. The film was produced by Faridur Reza Sagar and Abu Shahed Emon under the banner of Impress Telefilm. It stars Sariful Razz, Nusrat Imrose Tisha and Lutfur Rahman George in the lead roles and Shilpi Sharkar Apu, Joyeeta Mohlanbish, Kamrul Jinnah, Ujjal Kabir Himu and others in supporting roles.

Muhammad Tasneemul Hasan won the 48th Bangladesh National Film Awards in Best Screenwriter category for wrote the screenplay for the film.

== Cast ==
- Nusrat Imrose Tisha
- Sariful Razz
- Lutfur Rahman George
- Shilpi Sharkar Apu
- Joyeeta Mohlanbish
- Kamrul Jinnah
- Ujjal Kabir Himu
- Quazi Tanvir Rashid Apu
- Ariya Aritra

== Release ==
The film was released on OTT platform iScreen on Eid al-Adha on 29 June 2023. The film was screened at the 23rd Dhaka International Film Festival in 2025.

== Controversy ==
In 2026, the Ministry of Information and Broadcasting published the list of winners for the 2023 Bangladesh National Film Awards, where Niamul Mukta was named Best Screenplay Writer for the film. However, Mukta declined the award, stating that he was solely the director of the film and had not written its story or screenplay. He further requested that the accolade be rightfully awarded to Muhammad Tasneemul Hasan Taj, the actual screenwriter of the film. Following the controversy and Niamul Mukta's refusal, the Ministry of Information and Broadcasting reviewed the results, subsequently amending two award categories. Under the revised list, Muhammad Tasneemul Hasan was officially recognized and announced as the Best Screenwriter for the film.
