= Mahmudul Islam Mithu =

Bangladeshi actor

- Born: Rajbari, Bangladesh
- Other name: Borda Mithu
- Citizenship: Bangladeshi
- Occupation: Actor
- Years active: 1981-present

Mahmudul Islam Mithu (popularly known as Borda Mithu) is a Bangladeshi stage, television and film actor. He started his career as a stage actor. He is acting in several Television drama and films now. He is mostly popular for Daruchini Dwip (2007), Age Jodi Jantam Tui Hobi Por (2014), Bojhena Se Bojhena (2015) Musafir (2016), Shahenshah (2020), Eta Amaderi Golpo (2025–2026 TV drama) and Tomaderi Golpo (2025 telefilm).

== Career ==
Mithu's acting career began in 1981 with the Charan Theater in Rajbari. He acted in several plays including Bason, Ekhono Kritodas, Tomrai and others for this theater. Then in 1990, he came to Dhaka and started working with the Dhaka Theater. After working behind the stage for the first year, he later acted in several plays including Muntasir Fantasy, Dhurta We, Haat Hodai and others for this group. However, Mithu's debut in TV dramas was in the play Godhuri Lagane directed by Rowshan Ara Neepa. The play was broadcast on Bangladesh Television in 2001. In the same year, he also acted in the play Tomosh directed by Minhazur Rahman. He also acted in the story Dhaner Kabyo directed by Bivesh Roy. Mithu's first serial drama was Sangsar. He made his debut in the film Daruchini Dwip directed by Tauquir Ahmed. However, his performances in the films Age Jodi Jantam Tui Hobi Por, Musafir, Shahenshah were commendable. His performances in two television programs Eta Amaderi Golpo and Tomaderi Golpo were highly praised.

== Personal life ==
Mithu's wife is Jaya. He has two sons, Supreet and Rohit, and an only daughter, Joyita.

== Filmography ==
Year	title	role	director	notes
2007	Daruchini Dwip		Tauquir Ahmed	Debut film
2014	Age Jodi Jantam Tui Hobi Por		Montazur Rahman Akbar	
2015	Hariupiya		Golam Mostofa Shimul	
2015	Bojhena Se Bojhena		Montazur Rahman Akbar	
2015	Her Own Address		Prosun Rahman	
2016	Mukhosh Manush		Yeasir Arafat Jewel	
2016	Musafir		Ashiqur Rahman	
2017	Mastan O Police		Rakibul Alam Rakib	
2017	Tukhor		Mizanur Rahman Laboo	
2017	Crime Road		Simon Tarique	
2017	Sultana Bibiana		Himel Ashraf	
2017	Sona Bondhu		Jahangir Alam Sumon	
2017	Tui Amar		Sojol Ahmed	
2017	Chitkini	Sardar	Sazedul Awaal	
2018	Dhusor Kuasha		Uttam Akash	
2018	Kaaler Putul		Aka Reza Galib	
2018	Chittagainga Powa Noakhailla Maiya		Uttam Akash	
2019	Karon Tomay Valobashi		Golam Mostofa Shimul	
2020	Shahenshah	an MP	Shamim Ahmed Roni	
2022	Vaiya Re		Rakibul Alam Rakib	
2022	Birotto		Saidul Islam Rana	
2022	Jao Pakhi Bolo Tare		Mostafizur Rahman Manik	
2023	Ghor Bhanga Songshar		Montazur Rahman Akbar	
2023	Jemon Jamai Temon Bou		Montazur Rahman Akbar	
2023	Phirey Dekha		Rozina	
2023	Local		Saif Chandan	
2023	Kabaddi	Taherul Islam	Robayet Mahmud	
2023	Overtramp	Asgar	Bashar Jorjis	Web series
2023	Lal Shari		Bandhan Bishwas	
2024	Shesh Baazi		Mehedy Hasan	
2024	Trap		Din Islam	
2024	Mona: Jinn 2		Kamruzzaman Roman	
2024	Lipstick		Kamruzzaman Roman	
2024	Maya The Love		Jasim Uddin Jakir	
2024	Moynar Shesh Kotha		Babu Siddiki	
2024	Dark World		Mostafizur Rahman Manik	
2024	Suswagotom		Shafiqul Alam	
2024	Hurmati		Shabnam Parveen	
2025-2026	Eta Amaderi Golpo		Muhammad Mostafa Kamal Raz	TV serial on Channel i
2025	Tomader Golpo		Muhammad Mostafa Kamal Raz	Released on YouTube
2026	Prince	Shahid	Abu Hayat Mahmud	
2026	Malik		Saif Chandan	
2026	Tomader Golpo 2		Muhammad Mostafa Kamal Raz	Released on Channel i
