= Gunin =

- Bengali: গুণিন
- Directed by: Giasuddin Selim
- Screenplay by: Giasuddin Selim
- Based on: Gunin by Hasan Azizul Huq
- Starring: Pori Moni; Sariful Razz
- Cinematography: Kamrul Hasan Khosru
- Music by: Emon Chowdhury
- Production companies: Chorki; Splice Post Bangladesh Ltd.
- Distributed by: Chorki
- Release date: 11 March 2022
- Running time: 118 minutes
- Country: Bangladesh
- Language: Bengali

Gunin is a 2022 Bangladeshi supernatural romance film directed by Giasuddin Selim. He also wrote the screenplay, based on Hasan Azizul Huq's short story of the same name. The film stars Pori Moni, Sariful Razz, Dilara Zaman, Iresh Zaker, Mostafa Monwar, and Azad Abul Kalam. It was produced and distributed by Chorki and was released on theatre on 11 March 2022.

== Premise ==
Gunin is set in a rural area of 50 years ago. It is the story of a farmer from a village where paranormal activities were cast out at a dam located outside the village.

== Cast ==
- Pori Moni
- Sariful Razz
- Iresh Zaker
- Mostafa Monwar
- Azad Abul Kalam
- Dilara Zaman
- Naila Azad Nupur
- Jhuna Chowdhury
- Shilpi Sarkar Apu
- Nasir Uddin Khan
- Jahangir Alam
- Sumaiya Chowdhury
- Bithy Rani Sarker
- Shafiul Alam Babu

== Crew ==
- Zuairijah Mou as Executive Producer
- Yeamin Muzumder as Casting Director & Director Assistant
- Mikhail Najmul as Art Director
- MH Shorif Ongko as Assistant Art Director
- Samiun Jahan Dola as Costume Designer
- Turan Munshi as Line Producer
- Forhad Reza Milon as Make-up Artist
- Emon Chowdhury as Music Composer
- Sharif Ahmed as Editor
- Kamrul Hasan Khosru as Cinematographer

== Production ==
Nusraat Faria was set to play the character Rabeya in the film. But later, she left the film due to a schedule conflict, and Pori Moni replaced her. Principal photography took place in Brahmanbaria and Manikganj. Filming began on 10 October 2021. And the director wrapped up the shooting on 30 October 2021.

== Release ==
Gunin was released in theatres on 11 March 2022, followed by a digital streaming release on Chorki on 24 March 2022.

== Reception ==
Shadique Mahbub Islam of The Financial Express criticized the lack of plot depth of the film.
