= Tomader Golpo 2 =

2026 Bangladeshi television film

- Theatrical poster
- Bengali: তোমাদের গল্প ২
- Literally: Your Story 2
- Directed by: Mohammad Mostafa Kamal Raz
- Screenplay by: Siddiq Ahmed
- Produced by: Mohammad Mostafa Kamal Raz
- Starring: Farhan Ahmed Jovan; Tanjim Saiyara Totini; Khairul Alam Sabuj; Dilara Zaman; Nader Chowdhury; Saberi Alam
- Cinematography: Sumon Hossain
- Edited by: Rashed Rabbi
- Music by: Arfin Rumey
- Production company: CINEMAWALA
- Distributed by: CINEMAWALA; Channel i
- Release date: 28 May 2026
- Country: Bangladesh
- Language: Bengali

Tomader Golpo 2 (Bengali: তোমাদের গল্প ২, lit. 'Your Story 2') is a 2026 Bangladeshi romantic drama television film produced and directed by Mohammad Mostafa Kamal Raz under the banner of CINEMAWALA. It is the sequel of the 2025 television drama film Tomader Golpo. The film stars Farhan Ahmed Jovan and Tanjim Saiyara Totini in the lead role alongside Dilara Zaman, Khairul Alam Sabuj, Saberi Alam, Shilpi Sharkar Apu, Monira Mithu, Nader Chowdhury, Mahmudul Islam Mithu, Intekhab Dinar, Deepa Khandakar and others in supporting roles.

== Cast ==
- Farhan Ahmed Jovan as Ratul
- Tanjim Saiyara Totini as Shalu
- Dilara Zaman
- Khairul Alam Sabuj
- Saberi Alam
- Shilpi Sharkar Apu
- Monira Mithu
- Nader Chowdhury
- Mahmudul Islam Mithu
- Intekhab Dinar
- Deepa Khandakar
- Mnu Raju
- Ruzlan Ayaat
- Arbin

== Release ==
The film was released on Channel i and Cinemawala YouTube channel on 28 May 2026 on the occasion of Eid al-Adha.

== Reception ==
The film received positive response from audience. Wroted by The Daily Shomoyer Alo's survey "The audience are referring to 'Tomader Golpo-2' as a blockbuster drama". Wroted by Channel i's survey "Sumon Hossain, a audience wrote, "The tears at the end of the play were tears of joy. Tears of emotion."

Wroted by A M Rubel in Jugantor's survey "The film has in the trending position at the audience's praise and YouTube views". Wroted by The News 24's survey "It is a beautiful family story drama film". Wroted by Dhaka Post's survey "The drama film is ahead in audience preference".
