= Omar (2024 film) =

Bangladeshi action thriller film

- Movie poster
- Directed by: Mohammad Mostafa Kamal Raz
- Screenplay by: Siddiq Ahmed
- Story by: Mohammad Mostafa Kamal Raz
- Produced by: Khorshed Alam
- Starring: Sariful Razz; Darshana Banik; Nasir Uddin Khan; Shahiduzzaman Selim; Fazlur Rahman Babu
- Cinematography: Raju Raj
- Edited by: MD Kamal
- Music by: Savvy Gupta; Naved Parvez
- Production company: Master Communication
- Distributed by: Master Communication
- Release date: 11 April 2024
- Country: Bangladesh
- Language: Bengali
- Budget: ৳2 crore (US$160,000)
- Box office: ৳1.57 crore (US$130,000)

Omar is a 2024 Bangladeshi action thriller film, written and directed by Mohammad Mostafa Kamal Raz and produced by Khorshed Alam under the banner of Master Communication. The film stars Sariful Razz in the title role, alongside Darshana Banik, Nasir Uddin Khan, Shahiduzzaman Selim, Fazlur Rahman Babu, Arfan Mredha Shiblu, Rosey Siddique, and Abu Hurayra Tanvir.

The film's screenplay is by Siddiq Ahmed, cinematography is by Raju Raj and soundtrack is composed by Savvy Gupta and Naved Parvez.

== Cast ==
- Sariful Razz as Omar / Baker
- Darshana Banik as Herself, item girl in "Viral Baby" song
- Nasir Uddin Khan as Bodi
- Shahiduzzaman Selim as Ahsanul Haque Mirza
- Fazlur Rahman Babu as Baker's father
- Arfan Mredha Shiblu as Moti
- Rosey Siddique
- Abu Hurayra Tanvir as Choto Mirza
- Aymon Shimla
- Shohag Alam
- Tanzila Haque Maisha
- Bappi Ashraf
- Kanchan

== Production ==
Mohammad Mostafa Kamal Raz made the film almost five years after directing his previous film, Jodi Ekdin. Omar has been shot at various locations including Comilla, Sylhet, Savar and Cox's Bazar. The shooting of the film was done from September 1 to September 25, 2023.

== Release ==
The film was released in 21 theaters on 11 April 2024 on occasion of Eid al-Fitr.
