= Shilpi Sharkar Apu =

Bangladeshi actress

- Born: Shilpi Sharkar Apu; 12 April
- Citizenship: Bangladeshi
- Education: Political Science
- Alma mater: University of Dhaka
- Occupations: Actress, Teacher
- Spouse: Naresh Bhuiyan
- Children: 3 inclu. Yash Rohan

Shilpi Sarker Apu is a Bangladeshi actress, playwright, and educator. She is primarily known for her acting prowess in stage productions, television dramas, and films. She rose to fame in the 1980s by portraying the character "Shahana" in the popular TV serial Ei Shob Din Ratri. Her debut television drama was Sukher Upoma, and her first film was Nirontor. Over her long career, she has acted in numerous television dramas, short films, and feature films, among which Swapnajal (2018), Bhoyonkor Shundor, Debi (2018), and Gunin (2022) are particularly notable.

She was also involved in the teaching profession and is known as a socially conscious artist with a strong connection to the younger generation. Her son, Yash Rohan, has also established himself in the country's entertainment industry as a television and film actor.

== Career ==
Shilpi Sarker Apu began her acting career in the early 1980s by portraying the character "Shahana" in the popular Bangladesh Television drama series Ei Shob Din Ratri, through which she quickly gained widespread popularity. Since then, she has consistently played significant roles in numerous acclaimed television dramas, including Ujan Gang-er Naiya, Miss Shiuli, Je Shohore Taka Ore, and The Last Order.

She has also been equally active in films. Some of her notable film credits include Swapnajal, Bhoyonkor Shundor, Debi, Gunin, Lal Moroger Jhuti, 1971 Shei Shob Din, and Rokto Joba. Additionally, she starred in the internationally recognized short film The Soul, which was nominated at the Cannes Film Festival.

Apart from acting, she has also worked as a playwright and remained involved in the teaching profession. Her portrayal of motherly roles in many of her dramas and films has been marked by emotional depth and excellence, earning her a distinguished place in the realm of Bengali theatre and cinema.

== Filmography ==
=== Film ===
Year	Title	Role	Director	Notes
2006	Nirontor	Farida	Abu Sayyid	Debut film
2017	Bhoyongkor Shundor		Animesh Aich	
2018	Swapnajaal	Shuvra's mother	Giasuddin Selim	
2018	Debi		Anam Biswas	
2018	Dahan	Suman's mother	Raihan Rafi	
2019	Shapludu	Arman's mother	Ghulam Sohrab Dodul	
2019	Kathbirali	Kajol's mother	Niyamul Hasan Mukta	
2021	Laal Moroger Jhuti	Mayarani	Nurul Alam Atiq	
2021	Alatchakra		Habibur Rahman	
2022	Poran	Ananya's mother	Raihan Rafi	
2022	Redrum	Sohail's mother	Vicky Zahed	
2022	Gunin		Giasuddin Selim	
2022	Birotto	Dr. Raju's mother	Saidul Islam Rana	
2022	Daag		Sanjay Samaddar	Web film
2023	Jahan	Jahan's mother	Atiq Zaman	Web film
2023	Ma		Aranya Anwar	
2023	1971 Shei Shob Din		Hridi Haque	
2024	Booking	Tania'a mother	Mizanur Rahman Aryan	Web film
2025	Esha Murder: Karmaphal	Esha's mother	Sunny Sanwar	
2026	Tomader Golpo 2		Mohammad Mostafa Kamal Raz	Released on Channel i
TBA	Bildakini		Fazlul Kabir Tuhin	
TBA	The Battle of the Heroines		Rabiul Sikder	
TBA	Kathgolap		Sajjad Khan	

=== TV/Web Series ===
Year	Title	Introduction	Director	OTT	Notes	Ref.
2021–2022	Friendbook		Goutam Koiri	NTV		
2022	Nikhoj	Rabeya Ahmed	Rihan Rahman	Chorki		
2022	Pett Kata Shaw	Antara	Nuhash Humayun	Chorki		
2023	Mubaraknama	Parveen Begum	Ghulam Sohrab Dodul	Hoichoi		
2024	Rongila Kitab	Soma Aunt	Anam Biswas	Hoichoi		
2025–2026	Eta Amaderi Golpo	Afroj Binte Mariyam	Mohammad Mostafa Kamal Raz	Channel i		

== Personal life ==
Shilpi Sarker Apu completed her Bachelor's degree in Political Science from the University of Dhaka. On November 23, 1983, she married actor, director, and journalist Naresh Bhuiyan. The couple has three children, among whom their middle son, Yash Rohan, is a popular film actor of the current generation.

She had an early interest in dance and began performing on stage and in theatre after enrolling at the University of Dhaka. Alongside her acting career, she was also engaged in teaching and served as a senior teacher at Arambagh School and College.
