= Sunerah Binte Kamal =

Bangladeshi actress

- সুনেরাহ বিনতে কামাল
- Kamal in 2026
- Born: 22 August 1995 (age 31); Dhaka, Bangladesh
- Occupations: Model; actress
- Notable work: No Dorai; Daagi; Eta Amaderi Golpo
- Awards: National Film Award for Best Actress (2019)

Sunerah Binte Kamal (born 22 August 1995) is a Bangladeshi model, actress, and dancer. She won National Film Award for Best Actress for her debut film No Dorai (2019).

== Career ==
Sunerah made her debut in the film of No Dorai in 2019, which earned her a National Film Award for Best Actress.

== Filmography ==
=== Films ===
Year	Title	Role	Notes	Ref.
2019	No Dorai	Ayesha	Debut film	
2022	Shuklopokkho	Laboni	Released on Chorki	
2023	Antarjal	Priom		
2025	Daagi	Likhon		
2025	Utshob	Esha		
2026	The Difficult Bride			

=== Short films ===
Year	Film	Role	Director	Notes
2022	Moshari	Apu	Nuhash Humayun	Executive produced by Jordan Peele and Riz Ahmed

== Television ==
Year	Title	Role	Notes	Ref.
2025–2026	Eta Amaderi Golpo	Saira Chowdhury	TV serial on Channel i	

== Awards and nomination ==
Year	Award	Category	Work	Result	Ref.
2019	Bangladesh National Film Award for Best Actress	Best Actress	No Dorai	Won	
2026	Meril-Prothom Alo Award for Best TV Actress	Best TV Actress	Eta Amaderi Golpo	Nominated	
