= Bushra Afreen =

Asia's first Chief Heat Officer

- বুশরা আফরিন
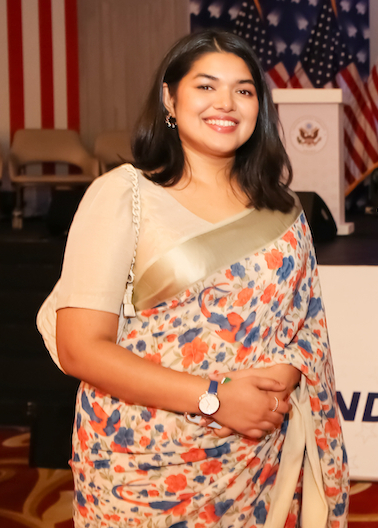
- Born: Dhaka, Bangladesh
- Occupations: Chief Heat Officer, Dhaka North City Corporation
- Father: Atiqul Islam

Bushra Afreen (Bengali: বুশরা আফরিন) is a Bangladeshi climate resilience specialist who served as the first Chief Heat Officer (CHO) of a municipality in Bangladesh. Afreen is believed to be the first appointment CHO in all of Asia. Appointed in May 2023 by the Arsht-Rockefeller Foundation Resilience Center, Afreen focused on mitigating the impacts of extreme urban heat in North Dhaka as it experienced rapid urbanization and climate-induced temperature increases.

== Early life and education ==
Bushra Afreen was born in Dhaka, Bangladesh. Her father Atiqul Islam went on to serve as the Dhaka North Mayor. She pursued higher education at Queen's University at Kingston in Canada, earning a degree in Arts and Science in 2017.

== Career ==
Before her appointment as CHO, Afreen worked as a social welfare consultant, advocating for worker rights and sustainable practices within Bangladesh's garment sector. In May 2023, Afreen was appointed as the Chief Heat Officer for Dhaka North City Corporation. This position, supported by the Adrienne Arsht-Rockefeller Foundation Resilience Centre (Arsht-Rock), was the first of its kind in Asia. Arsht-Rock had already created other CHO positions in places such as Miami, Florida; Santiago, Chile; Freetown, Sierra Leone; Athens, Greece; and Melbourne, Australia. Afreen did not receive a salary from the Dhaka North City Corporation; her compensation was provided by Arsht-Rock, underscoring the international and collaborative nature of the initiative. She left the role in 2024.

As CHO, Afreen has spearheaded several initiatives aimed at enhancing urban heat resilience, such as urban forest expansion, heat awareness campaigns, and climate action planning.

In 2024, she spoke at the Sustainable Cities in Action Forum, in Dubai. She emphasized the impact of heat on women in traditional societies like Bangladesh.

"In most traditional families, a woman will cook, clean the house ... do a lot of the manual labour and put herself in front of a heat source like a fire or a stove,... If the power goes out, they will spend their entire night fanning her husband or her child... When you don't get a respite from the heat, when you're not able to cool down and rest, you're making yourself weaker and weaker."

=== Film production ===
Beyond her climate and policy work, Afreen co-produced the short film Moshari, directed by Nuhash Humayun. The horror short became the first Bangladeshi film to qualify for the Oscars. Afreen described the story as “a metaphor for how climate change can rob women and girls of their childhood and innocence,” drawing parallels with her climate advocacy.
