= Malik (2026 film) =

- Film poster
- Directed by: Saif Chandan
- Screenplay by: Siddique Ahmed
- Story by: Sohel Rana
- Produced by: Moazzem Hossain Shawon
- Starring: Arifin Shuvoo; Bidya Sinha Mim; Misha Sawdagor; Monira Mithu
- Cinematography: Bishwajit Datta
- Edited by: Rean Islam Sohel
- Music by: Adit Rahman
- Production company: Divine Multimedia
- Distributed by: Tiger Media; The Abhi Kathachitra; Ekushey Television; FilmBuzz
- Release date: 28 May 2026
- Running time: 129 minutes
- Country: Bangladesh
- Language: Bengali

Malik (Bengali: মালিক, transl. Owner) is a 2026 Bangladeshi action film. Directed by Saif Chandan under the banner of Divine Multimedia. The story written by Sohel Rana and Siddique Ahmed wrote the screenplay and dialogues. Arifin Shuvoo and Bidya Sinha Mim play the lead roles.

Biswajit Dutta's cinematography are edited by Rean Islam Sohel and music is composed by Adit Rahman. Arifin Shuvoo and Bidya Sinha Mim last acted together in the film Shapludu in 2019. This is the seventh film of director Saif Chandan, he last directed the Local film in 2023.

== Cast ==
- Arifin Shuvoo as Amir
- Bidya Sinha Mim as Mayaboti
- Misha Sawdagor as Alauddin
- Monira Mithu
- Tiger Robi
- Arfan Mredha Shiblu
- Nima Rahman
- Mahmudul Islam Mithu as George
- Salahuddin Lavlu as Habibullah

== Marketing ==
On the night of 20 May 2026, the production company Tiger Media officially announced the release of the film on Eid al-Adha by releasing the poster. The trailer was released on YouTube on 23 May, shortly after the censors were completed.

== Release ==
The film was released in theaters in Bangladesh on 28 May 2026, distributed by The Abhi Kathachitra.

== Reception ==
=== Critical response ===
Writing for Bangla Movie Database, Rahman Moti gave rating 5.5 out of 10 and calling it a hero-centric entertainer. He noted that strong star power and good technical execution overcome a weak, predictable script focused entirely on the lead. Wroted by Nazmul Haque in Prothom Alo's survey "Arifin Shuvoo is great in action scenes".

=== Audience response ===
Malik received mixed responses from audience and critics. While wroted by Sheikh Arif Bulbon in The New Nation's survey "The audience is enjoying seeing Shuvoo in action scenes and looks but the film story are weak". Wroted by Jago News 24's survey "This film has faced criticism for its weak story and screenplay". Wroted by Wahidur Rahman in Bonik Barta's survey "Shuvoo's action hero look in the film are make excited but the film could not fully meet the expectations of the audience due to the weak story and screenplay".

Wroted by Alauddin Majid in Bangladesh Pratidin's survey "Malik, an action-based story, has created a special interest among the audience". Wroted by FI Deepu in Jugantor's survey "this film was somewhat enjoyable for action lovers". Wroted by Jahangir Biplob in Desh Rupantor's survey "Viewers are giving positive reviews after watching the movie in various cinema halls of the country including Star Cineplex".

On Letterboxd, public response to the 2026 film Malik remains generally mixed to positive. Audiences frequently praise the lead actor's charismatic screen presence, high-octane action choreography, and polished visual production. Many users highlight the gripping nature of the individual sequences and the film's stylish presentation as key strengths for commercial cinema fans. Conversely, several reviewers point out narrative flaws, citing a formulaic story arc, pacing issues in the second half, and underdeveloped side characters. Despite these structural criticisms, the general consensus among Letterboxd users reflects strong entertainment value for viewers seeking a hero-centric, mass-appeal action drama.
