= Mona: Jinn-2 =

Bangladeshi Bengali-language supernatural thriller film

Mona: Jinn 2
- Official theatrical release poster
- Directed by: Kamruzzaman Roman
- Written by: Abdul Aziz
- Screenplay by: Abdul Aziz
- Produced by: Abdul Aziz
- Starring: Suprovat; Tariq Anam Khan; Ahmed Rubel; Deepa Khondkar; Ariana Zaman
- Cinematography: Forhad Hussain
- Edited by: Mostakim Suzon
- Production company: Jaaz Multimedia
- Distributed by: Jaaz Multimedia
- Release date: 11 April 2024 (Bangladesh)
- Running time: 124 minutes
- Country: Bangladesh
- Language: Bengali

Mona: Jinn 2 (Bengali: মোনা: জ্বীন-২) is a 2024 Bangladeshi Bengali-language supernatural thriller film directed by Kamruzzaman Roman and produced by Abdul Aziz under the banner of Jaaz Multimedia. It is the direct sequel to the 2023 film Jinn and was released during Eid al-Fitr on 11 April 2024 in Bangladesh. It later received a theatrical release in Pakistan on 26 April 2024, marking a notable cross-border distribution achievement for a Bangladeshi horror film.

== Plot ==
Mona: Jinn-2 follows the story of a young girl named Mona, whose family moves into an old ancestral home in rural Bangladesh. The house, previously used as a madrasa, is rumoured to be haunted. Soon after settling in, Mona begins to exhibit disturbing behaviour, characterised by sudden mood swings, visions, and episodes of dissociation. Her actions become increasingly erratic and violent, leaving her parents deeply worried.

As the unexplained phenomena intensify, the family seeks assistance from local religious figures and spiritual healers. A respected imam and a spiritual investigator are brought in to confront the supernatural presence. It is gradually revealed that Mona is possessed by a jinn—an unseen entity connected to a tragic incident from the past involving injustice and revenge.

Efforts to exorcise the jinn escalate as the entity resists all conventional methods of expulsion. Flashbacks reveal the jinn's origins and its connection to the house’s dark history. The situation deteriorates until a final ritual is performed in a desperate attempt to save Mona. Although the jinn is ultimately subdued, the ending remains ambiguous, with lingering signs that the spirit may not be entirely gone.

The story is claimed to be loosely based on true events, a common element in Bangladeshi and South Asian horror cinema intended to heighten suspense and strengthen audience engagement.

== Cast ==
- Suprovat as Mona
- Tariq Anam Khan
- Ahmed Rubel
- Deepa Khondkar
- Ariana Zaman
- Sazzad Hossain
- Samina Basar Megha
- Shehzad Omar
- Rebeka Rouf
- Mohammad Mahmudul Islam Mithu
- Shamim

== Production ==
Mona: Jinn 2 was produced and distributed by Jaaz Multimedia, one of Bangladesh's leading film production companies specializing in commercial cinema. The film's screenplay and dialogues were written by Abdul Aziz. Cinematography was conducted by Forhad Hussain, and editing by Mostakim Suzon.

== Promotion ==
Jazz multimedia promoted the movie with poster and movie clips. They announced 100,000 BDT prize for winning the 'watch-alone' competition.

== Release ==
The film premiered in Bangladesh on 11 April 2024, coinciding with the Eid-ul-Fitr holiday to maximize audience turnout. Following its domestic release, it opened in Pakistani cinemas on 26 April 2024, an unusual cross-border theatrical release for Bangladeshi films which received considerable attention in media.

== Reception ==
The film's reception was mixed. It holds an IMDb user rating of 4.2/10 based on 129 user votes as of July 2025. Critics and audiences praised the visual effects, the lead performance by Suprovat, and the expansion of Bangladeshi horror cinema. However, criticism was directed at its storytelling, pacing, and accusations about originality.

== Controversy ==
Shortly after releasing its poster on 19 March 2024, the film stirred debate on Bangladeshi social media platforms. Several users noticed the striking resemblance of the poster design to the Indonesian film Munkar, leading to accusations of plagiarism in marketing and promotional materials.

== Cultural impact ==
Mona: Jinn 2 became a trending topic on platforms like TikTok and YouTube within Bangladesh due to reaction videos, fan edits, scene analyses, and "roast reviews" by audiences. The success and discussions around the film have cemented it as one of the notable Bangladeshi horror films of the 2020s.

The film serves as part of a horror franchise, with a sequel titled Jinn 3 officially announced by the producers, continuing the storyline and commercial success.

== Availability ==
Although originally conceptualized as a web film, Mona: Jinn 2 was released theatrically due to its high production value and audience anticipation. Various clips, scenes, and unofficial full versions also circulate on online video platforms such as YouTube and Dailymotion.
