= Niamul Mukta =

Bangladeshi film director, producer, editor and screenwriter

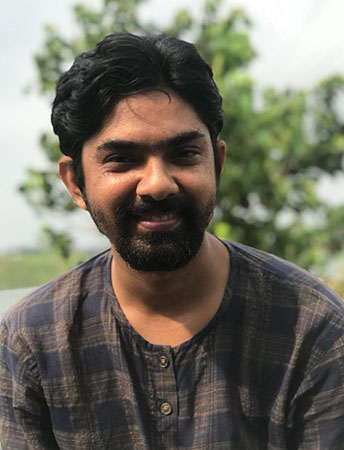
- Born: 21 February 1988 (age 38); Pabna, Bangladesh
- Education: National University of Bangladesh
- Occupations: Director; producer; screenwriter; editor
- Years active: 2010–present
- Spouse: Moushumi Mozid Mou

Niamul Mukta (born 21 February 1988) is a Bangladeshi film director, producer, editor and screenwriter who works in Dhallywood films. He debuted with the romantic-drama Kathbirali (2020) and later directed the Roktojoba (2023) which are released on iScreen.

== Biography ==
Niamul Mukta was born as Niamul Hasan Mukta on 21 February in Vangura, Pabna, Bangladesh. He earned an M.Sc. degree in chemistry from Titumir University College under National University of Bangladesh. Since 2010, Mukta has been involved in Bangladeshi media. He earned fame by Kathbirali Cinema. His first feature film, Kathbirali, was released on 17 January 2020. Kathbirali is the story of a couple and their struggle to keep the love alive. The film has been distributed by Jazz Multimedia. In 2021, he started filming his latest film Roktojoba and it was released on OTT platform iScreen on Eid al-Adha 2023.

== Filmography ==
| Year | Film | Credits as | Notes | Ref. |
|---|---|---|---|---|
| 2012 | Chorabali | Assistant director | | |
| 2014 | Behind the Trap | Assistant director | Television serial on NTV | |
| 2019 | Bhalo Theko Ful | Producer | Short film | |
| 2020 | Lottery | Producer | Short film; Won — the 'Outstanding Achievement Award' at the Calcutta International Cult Film Festival | |
| 2020 | Kathbirali | Story writer, producer and director | Directorial debut film | |
| 2023 | Roktojoba | Director and editor | Released on iScreen | |
