= Kathbirali =

2020 Bangladeshi film

- Theatrical release poster
- Directed by: Niamul Mukta
- Screenplay by: Muhammad Tasneemul Hasan
- Story by: Niamul Mukta
- Produced by: Niamul Mukta
- Starring: Orchita Sporshia; Asaduzzaman Abir; Sayed Zaman Shawon; Shilpi Sarkar Apu; AK Azad Setu; Shahriar Ferdous Sajib; Hindol Roy; Tanzina Rahman Tasnim
- Cinematography: Aditya Monir
- Edited by: Ashiqur Rahman Sujon
- Music by: Emon Chowdhury
- Production company: Chilekotha Films
- Distributed by: Jaaz Multimedia
- Release date: December 27, 2019
- Running time: 115 minutes
- Country: Bangladesh
- Language: Bangla

Kathbirali (transl. The Squirrel) (Bengali: কাঠবিড়ালী) is a 2019 Bangladeshi romantic drama film. The film story was written and directed by Niamul Mukta and produced by Chilekotha Films. It features Asaduzzaman Abir and Orchita Sporshia in the lead roles and Sayed Zaman Shawon, Shilpi Sarkar Apu, AK Azad Setu, Shahriar Ferdous Sajib, Hindol Roy, Tanvir Ahmed Anontow, Tanjina Rahman Tasnim played supporting roles in the film. The film was released on January 17, 2020.

== Cast ==
- Asaduzzaman Abir as Hashu
- Orchita Sporshia as Kajal
- Shilpi Sarkar Apu as Kajal's mother
- Hindol Roy as Asgor's father
- AK Azad Setu as Police
- Tanjina Rahman Tasnim as Anis's wife Bilkis

== Soundtrack ==
Kathbirali

Soundtrack album by Yousuf Hasan Ark, Emon Chowdhury
- Released: 2020
- Genre: Feature Film Soundtrack
- Length: 10:24
- Language: Bengali
- Label: Jaaz Multimedia
- Producer: Yousuf Hasan Ark, Emon Chowdhury

The soundtrack album of the film composed by Yousuf Hasan Ark and Emon Chowdhury.

Track list
| No. | Title | Lyrics | Music | Singer(s) | Length |
|---|---|---|---|---|---|
| 1. | "Sundor Konna (সুন্দর কন্যা)" | Selim Al Din | Yousuf Hasan Ark, Emon Chowdhury | Shofi Mondol | 3:22 |
| 2. | "Poti" (Tumare Dekhbo Ami) | Noyachand Gosh, | Yousuf Hasan Ark, Emon Chowdhury | Dilshad Nahar Kona, Emon Chowdhury | 2:42 |
| 3. | "Jibon Jay (জীবন যায়)" | Al-Amin Hasan Nirjhar | Emon Chowdhury | Emon Chowdhury | 4:20 |
| Total length: | | | | | 10:24 |

== Release ==
The film was first released in one theater on December 27, 2019. On January 17, 2020, the film released nationwide in 18 theaters.
