= Barisal Government Women's College =

Bangladeshi college

Coordinates: 22.7045°N 90.3688°E

- বরিশাল সরকারি মহিলা কলেজ
- Established: 1957; 69 years ago
- Academic staff: 55 (2024)
- Administrative staff: 14 (2024)
- Students: 5,667 (2024)
- Location: Barisal, Bangladesh
- Website: bwc.gov.bd

Barisal Government Women's College is a master's degree college in Barisal, Bangladesh.

== History ==
The college was established as Women's College, Barisal, in 1957. Initially it offered only an Intermediate of Arts. In 1963, it added home economics up to intermediate level. It introduced a pass-level Bachelor of Arts in 1964. It became affiliated with Dacca University in the 1964–1965 academic year. Science was added for pre-medical students in 1966.

The college was nationalized in 1987. It has over 3,600 students and eight honours level subjects.

== Notable alumni ==
- Kaberi Gayen, academic, author, and social activist
- Tanjim Saiyara Totini, TV actress
