= Keya Payel =

Bangladeshi actress

- Born: 11 March 1997 (age 29); Savar, Bangladesh
- Education: Southeast University
- Occupations: Actress, model
- Years active: 2019–present

Keya Akter Payel Born 11 march 1997 is a Bangladeshi television actress, film actress and model. She is mostly popular for her works in Bangladeshi dramas. She was the lead actress in the 2019 film Indubala.

== Early life and education ==
Payel was born on 11 march 1997 in Savar. She attended Uttara Cambrian School and College, and she studied law at Southeast University and graduated in 2025.

== Filmography ==
=== Films ===
Key
†	Denotes films that have not yet been released

Year	Title	Role	Notes	Ref.
2019	Indubala	Indu	Debut film	
2025	Saat Bhai Champa: Adi	Pushpo		
2026	Happily Married	Anamika Anu	Released on Chorki	
TBA	Aynaghor †	TBA	Filming	

== Television ==
=== TV serials ===
Year	Title	Role	Notes	Ref.
2021–2022	Joint Family		TV serial on NTV	
2025–2026	Eta Amaderi Golpo	Afia Afroj "Meherin"	Won – Meril-Prothom Alo Awards for Best Actress in television series; TV serial on Channel i	

=== TV dramas ===
- Ektai Amar Tumi (debut telefilm)
- Zero
- Ghuddi
- Unknown Lover
- Flying Kiss
- Shedin Brishti Hobe
- Megh Kete Jawa Rodh
- Hrid Majhare
- Sir Er Biye
- Crime Partner
- Mad Man
- Go To Hell
- Sorry Bindu
- Possessives Wife
- Chomon Bahar
- Boss I Hate You
- Bibah Korite Icchuk
- Boyosh Kono Bapar Na
- Abujh Mon (2020)
- Bagher Khancha (2020)
- Bone Bhojon (2020)
- Bura Jamai (2020)
- Chilekothar Badshah (2020)
- Ek Dofa Ek Dabi (2020)
- Hoyto Tomari Jonnyo (2020)
- Kufa Zainal (2020)
- Problem to Point Five (2020)
- Question (2020)
- Shorto Projojjyo (2020)
- Silent Zone (2020)
- Trump Card (2020)
- Yeh Kore Biye (2020)
- Amar Ma Sob Jane (2021)
- Don Be Quite (2021)
- Don't Disturb (2021)
- Dourer Upor Oushod Nai-2 (2021)
- Ek Biye Sara Jeevanner Kanna (2021)
- Ex-Husband (2021)
- Harano Diner Gaan (2021)
- Kabinnama (2021)
- Love Pap Pape Fapor (2021)
- Mayer Dak (2021)
- Meradonar Chele (2021)
- One-Sided Love (2021)
- Pach Bhai Chompa (2021)
- Shponer Nayika (2021)
- Shuvo+Neel (2021)
- Sroter Biporite (2021)
- Ura Dhura Valobasha (2021)
- Urchi Tomar Preme (2022)
- Bhulona Amay
- Aponjon
- Irsha
- Hothath Pawa Bou (2023)
- Bouer Bari
- Dekha Hobe Bondhu
- Kotipoti
- Aira
- Pallu Billur Biye (2026)
- Buker Bhitor Agun (2026)

=== Music videos ===
Year	Title	Singer	Co-artist	Ref.
2018	"Valobashi Tai"	Tahsan Rahman Khan	Tahsan Rahman Khan	
2019	"Keno Eto Chai Toke"	Imran Mahmudul & Fairooj Labiba	Kazi Asif Rahman	
2020	"Eto Valobashi"	Imran Mahmudul	Imran Mahmudul	
2020	"Dari Koma"	Shiekh Sadi	Shiekh Sadi	
2021	"Alo"	Imran Mahmudul & Poni Chakma	Imran Mahmudul & Poni Chakma	
2021	"Poran Bondhure"	Imran Mahmudul	Imran Mahmudul	

== Awards and nominations ==
Year	Awards	Category	Work	Result	Ref.
2026	BIFA Awards	Best Actress in Popolarity	Eta Amaderi Golpo	Won	
