= Moshari =

2022 Bangladeshi horror short film

- Poster
- Bengali: মশারি
- Directed by: Nuhash Humayun
- Written by: Nuhash Humayun
- Screenplay by: Nuhash Humayun
- Produced by: Bushra Afreen; Nuhash Humayun
- Starring: Sunerah Binte Kamal; Nairah Onora Saif; Moyed Bhuiyan
- Music by: Dameer Khan; Sng Ye Min
- Distributed by: Little Big Films; Monkeypaw Productions; Left Handed Films
- Release date: 13 March 2022 (SXSW)
- Running time: 22 mins
- Country: Bangladesh
- Language: Bengali

Moshari (lit. 'The mosquito net') is a 2022 Bangladeshi horror short film directed by Nuhash Humayun and produced by Little Big Films. Set in a fictitious world in the future, the film features Sunerah Binte Kamal, Nairah Onora Saif and Moyed Bhuiyan in lead roles.

== Synopsis ==
This short film depicts a futuristic world where monsters are rampant and mankind has disappeared from all parts of the world except Dhaka. In that city, two sisters Apu and Ayra spend their nights inside a mosquito net to protect themselves from monsters. One night Ayra comes out of the mosquito net and is attacked by a monster. Her sister Apu comes forward to save her.

== Cast ==
- Sunerah Binte Kamal as Apu
- Nairah Onora Saif as Ayra
- Moyed Bhuiyan

== Production ==
Nuhash Humayun produced the film in 2019 to be sent to film festivals. This is the debut film of Nairah Onora Saif, who is the daughter of Shila Ahmed, sister of Nuhash. In November 2022, Jordan Peele and Riz Ahmed joined as executive producers of the film on the behalf of Monkeypaw Productions and Left Handed Films respectively.

== Release ==
The film had its release on 13 March 2022 at South by Southwest. On 15 October 2022, Moshari was made available via Vimeo. It was also screened at Marché du Film, Indie Meme Film festival, Indian Film Festival of Los Angeles and Sitges Film Festival in the same year.

== Reception ==
=== Critical response ===
According to Fatin Hamama of The Daily Star, the film is the perfect representation of a society where women become victims of the patriarchy. Remnant Glimpses wrote, "As much as Moshari looks like a great horror movie, understanding its underlying message will also find relevance to today's society. Which makes the content even more enjoyable". Panos Kotzathanasis of Asianmoviepulse.com thinks that the director wanted to show real issues such as climate change through metaphors. Through the line "I can't breathe" in the film, the filmmaker accuses the authorities of being responsible for these issues. Siffat Bin Ayub of The Business Standard praised the filmmaking. Calling it "the most visually striking short in Bangladesh", T. Aumia Khundkar of Ice Today also praised the film. However, according to Siam Raihan of The Business Post, the film couldn’t evoke a sense of horror in the audiences. He criticised what he described as its mediocre screenplay and poor dialogue delivery.

=== Accolades ===
List of awards and nominations
| Organization | Year | Category | Recipients & nominees | Result | Ref.(s) |
|---|---|---|---|---|---|
| South by Southwest | 2022 | Midnight short | Nuhash Humayun | Won | |
| HollyShorts Film Festival | 2022 | Best horror film | Nuhash Humayun | Won | |
| Atlanta Film Festival | 2022 | Best Narrative Short | Nuhash Humayun | Won | |
| Melbourne International Film Festival | 2022 | Best short fiction | Nuhash Humayun | Won | |
| Bucheon International Fantastic Film Festival | 2022 | Jury's Choice award | Nuhash Humayun | Won | |
| Woodstock Film Festival | 2022 | Narrative film | Nuhash Humayun | Won | |
| Short Shorts Film Festival & Asia | 2022 | Best Short and Governor of Tokyo Award | Nuhash Humayun | Won | |
| Mark Braunstein Award | 2022 | Best Narrative Short | Nuhash Humayun | Won | |
