= Deepa Khandakar =

Bangladeshi actress

- দীপা খন্দকার
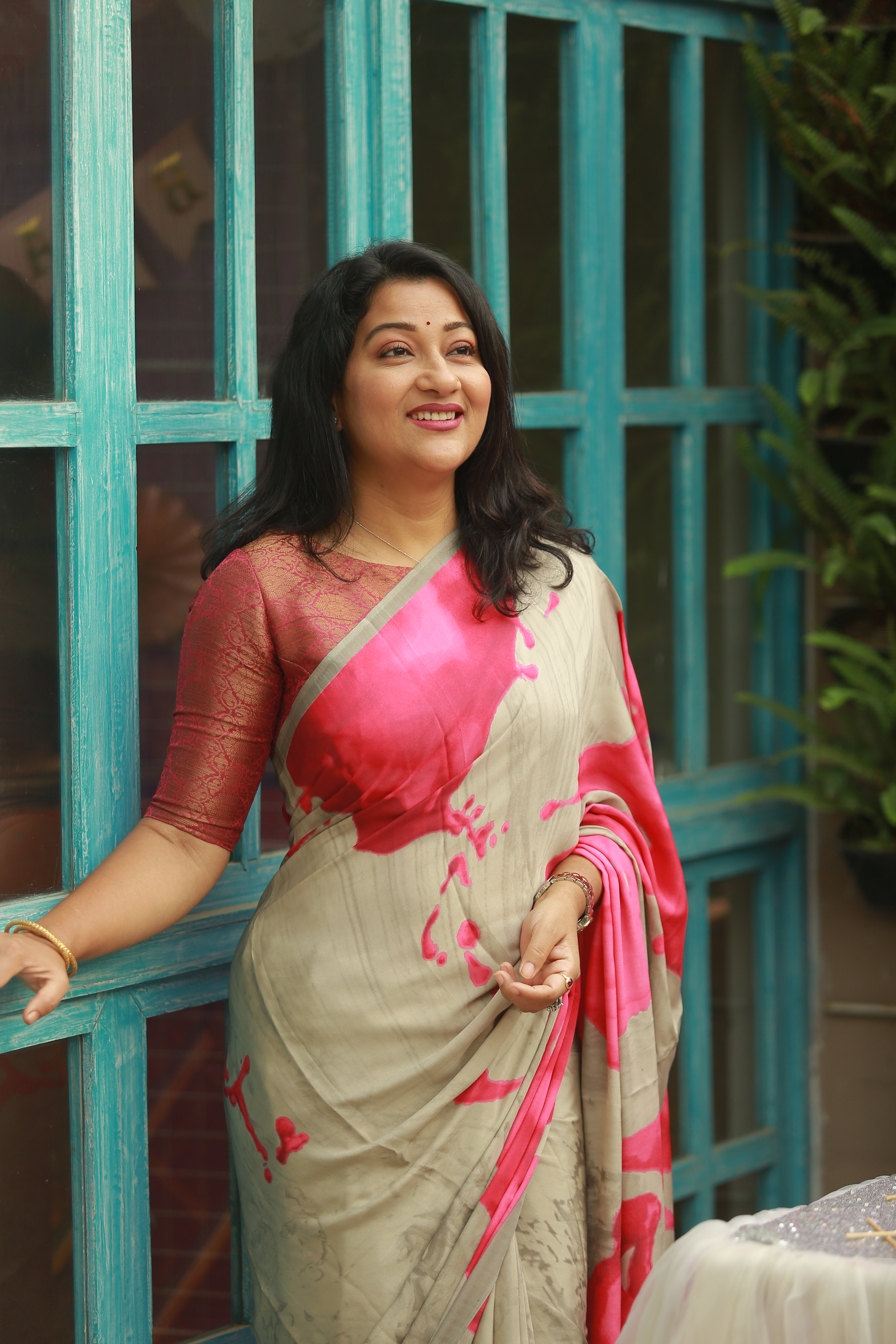
- Deepa in 2021
- Occupation: Actress
- Years active: 1999–present
- Spouse: Shahed Ali Sujon (m. 2006)

Deepa Khandakar is a Bangladeshi television actress. She mainly acts in television dramas, while also appearing in films and commercials. Among her notable Indian Bengali films is Bhaijaan Elo Re (2018).

== Early life and career ==
Khandakar spent her childhood at Narayanganj. Before starting her acting career, she served as a flight attendant. She debuted in acting in the television play Kaktarua.

Her popular tel-dramas include 'Meghe Dhaka Manus', 'Ebong Ami', 'Andhakare Phul', 'Ghar Sangsar', 'Mohua', 'Swapnabhog', 'Society', 'Sakkhi Kutum', among many others. She has also received immense praise for her role as a presenter in the TV show titled 'House Wife'. The program aired on Channel 24. Deepa Khandakar appeared in a Canadian feature film A Father's Diary directed by Golam Mustofa, acting as mother in a supporting role.

Khandakar has done television commercials for companies including Swan Foam, Aarong, Lipton Tazaa Tea, Starship, Cute Powder, Tibet, and Tibet Coconut Oil.

Khandakar debuted in film acting through Bhaijaan Elo Re (2018).

== Personal life ==
Khandakar married actor Shahed Ali in 2006. They have a son named Aadrik and a daughter named Aarohi.

== Works ==
=== Films ===
Key
†	Denotes films that have not yet been released

Years	Title	Role	Notes	Ref.
2018	Bhaijaan Elo Re	Ajaan and Ujaan's Sister	Indian Bengali film	
2021	A Father's Diary			
2024	Dark World			
2026	Shomporker Golpo	Kanta	Released on YouTube	
2026	Officer			
2026	Tosnos	Bibi Chowdhury		
2026	Tomader Golpo 2		Released on Channel i	
2026	Hangor †	TBA	Filming	

=== Television series ===
Television dramas
Year	Title	Role	Notes	Ref.
2022	Crossroads	Elora	TV serial on Binge	
2025–2026	Eta Amaderi Golpo	Fatema	Won – Dhallywood Film and Music Awards for Best Supporting Actress; TV serial on Channel i	

== Awards and nominations ==
Year	Awards	Category	Work	Result	Ref.
2026	BIFA Awards	Best Breakthrough Actress (Drama)	Eta Amaderi Golpo	Won	
