= Tanjim Saiyara Totini =

Bangladeshi actress and model

- তাঞ্জিম সাইয়ারা তটিনী
- Tanjim Saiyara Totini at the 24th Meril-Prothom Alo Awards 2023
- Pronunciation: [t̪and͡ʒim sai̯aɾa t̪ɔʈini]
- Born: 24 August 2000 (age 26); Barisal, Bangladesh
- Education: North South University
- Occupations: Actress and Model
- Years active: 2019–present
- Height: 5 ft 2 in (157 cm)
- Awards: Meril-Prothom Alo Award for Best Actress

Tanjim Saiyara Totini (Note: Bengali: [t̪and͡ʒim sai̯aɾa t̪ɔʈini].) (Bengali: তাঞ্জিম সাইয়ারা তটিনী, pronounced [t̪and͡ʒim sai̯aɾa t̪ɔʈini]; born 24 August 2000 ), popularly known as Totini, is a Bangladeshi television drama actress and model. She received the Meril-Prothom Alo Award for Best Actress in the short film category for her notable performance in the drama Somoy Sob Jane (2023).

== Early life and education ==
Tanjim Saiyara Totini was born on 24 August 2000 in Barisal City, Bangladesh. She has completed her HSC from Barisal Government Women's College with a Golden GPA of 5.00. She has completed her BBA in marketing at North South University, pending her internship yet.

== Career ==
Totini started her modeling career in 2019, working in advertising for some three years. After this, she made her acting debut in Chorki's anthology webfilm Kolpona, part of Ei Muhurte (2022). Her debut television drama was Sharod Prate in (2022). She received the Meril-Prothom Alo Award for Best Actress in the short film category for her performance in the drama Somoy Sob Jane (2023). She won the Deepto Award for Best Actress for her performance in the television drama Bhalobashar Prothom Kodom Phool (2024). She won the BIFA Award in the Best Rising Star category in 2024. Her debut silver screen film is Jaya Aar Sharmin (2025).

== Filmography ==
Key
†	Denotes films that have not yet been released

Year	Film	Role	Notes	Ref.
2025	Jaya Aar Sharmin	Herself	Debut film; special appearance	
2025	Tomader Golpo	Shalu	Released on YouTube	
2025	Tomar Jonno Mon	Piu	Released on Chorki	
2026	Shomporker Golpo	Sara	Released on YouTube	
2026	Tomader Golpo 2	Shalu	Released on Channel i	
2026	Kajol Chokher Meye		Released on YouTube	
2026-Present	Phire Ashar Golpo	Nurjahan	Bi-weekly serial on YouTube	

== Television ==
2021

- Taqdeer (তাকদীর) (web-film)
- House No. 96 (হাউজ নং ৯৬) (TV serial)

2021

- Mute: Silence of Love (মিউট: সাইলেন্স অফ লাভ) (unreleased)

2022

- Lilua (লিলুয়া)
- Ei Muhurte (এই মুহূর্তে) (Chorki original film)
- Bachibar Tar Holo Sadh (বাঁচিবার তার হোলো সাধ)
- Suhasini (সুহাসিনী)
- New Market (নিউ মার্কেট)
- Sharod Prate (শারদ প্রাতে)
- Comedian (কমেডিয়ান)

2023

- Somoy Sob Jaane (সময় সব জানে)
- Eso Hath Barao (এসো হাত বাড়াও)
- O Amay Bhalobasheni (ও আমায় ভালোবাসেনি)
- Last Night (লাস্ট নাইট)
- Shortcut Love Story (শর্টকাট লাভ স্টোরি)
- Pronoy (প্রণয়)
- Chatgaiya Hedom (চাটগাইয়া হেডম)
- Bohiragoto (বহিরাগত)
- Takar Nesha (টাকার নেশা)
- Hotath Brishty (হঠাৎ বৃষ্টি)
- Nirbasito (নির্বাসিত)
- Agnigiri (অগ্নিগিরী)
- Sweet Couple (সুইট কাপল)
- Oboseshe (অবশেষে)
- Kotha Chilo (কথা ছিলো)
- Je Prem Esechilo (যে প্রেম এসেছিল)
- Obak Kando (অবাক কান্ড)
- Pothe Holo Porichoy (পথে হলো পরিচয়)
- Tomake Peye Gele (তোমায় পেয়ে গেলে)
- Se Bose Eka (সে বসে একা)
- Mismatch (মিসম্যাচ)
- Tomay Holo Pawa (তোমায় হলো পাওয়া)
- Pothe Holo Deri (পথে হলো দেরী)
- Shui (সূই)
- Briefcase (ব্রিফকেস)
- Brishtite Dekha (বৃষ্টিতে দেখা)

2024

- Shasti (শাস্তি)
- Otitpur (অতীতপুর)
- Bishoyta Valobashar (বিষয়টা ভালোবাসার)
- Reshmi Churi (রেশমী চুড়ি)
- Ek Jibone (এক জীবনে)
- Jora Shalik (জোড়া শালিক)
- Ektai Tumi (একটাই তুমি)
- Mon Pinjira (মন পিঞ্জিরা)
- Sesh Ghum (শেষ ঘুম)
- Se Amar Aponjon (সে আমার আপনজন)
- Pori (পরী)
- Rong Radhia (রং রাধিয়া)
- Amar Thakis Tui (আমার থাকিস তুই)
- Jaoa Asar Majhe (যাওয়া আসার মাঝে)
- Pora Chokh (পোড়া চোখ)
- UNO Sir (ইউএনও স্যার)
- Bolte Chai (বলতে চাই)
- Chinno (চিহ্ন)
- Rongin Asha (রঙিন আশা)
- Boita Asole Dey Ke? (বইটা আসলে দেয় কে?)
- Sesh Kichudin (শেষ কিছুদিন)
- Sombhovoto Prem (সম্ভবত প্রেম)
- Ride Sharing (রাইড শেয়ারিং)
- Kichu Kotha Baki (কিছু কথা বাকি)
- I+U (আই + ইউ)
- Amar Britte Tumi (আমার বৃত্তে তুমি)
- Dottok (দত্তক)
- Koto Je Apon (কত যে আপন)
- Prem Esechilo EKbaar (প্রেম এসেছিলো একবার)
- Nil Noyona (নীল নয়না)
- Tor Jonye Morte Pari (তোর জন্যে মরতে পারি)
- Nayantara (নয়নতারা)
- Vitore Bahire (ভিতরে বাহিরে)
- Jekhane Prem Nei (যেখানে প্রেম নেই)
- Loving Friend (লাভিং ফ্রেন্ড)
- Bhalobashar Prothom Kodom Phool (ভালোবাসার প্রথম কদম ফুল)
- Love Sab (লাভ সাব)
- Blame Game (ব্লেইম গেম)
- Mon Bojhe Na (মন বোঝে না)
- Hotath Bhalobasha (হঠাৎ ভালোবাসা)
- Bhalobashay Adore (ভালোবাসায় আদরে)
- Tahar Namti Maya (তাহার নামটি মায়া)
- Durdesh (দূরদেশ)
- Sorbosso Baji (সর্বস্ব বাজি)
- Chokh Je Mayer Kotha Bole (চোখ যে মায়ের কথা বলে)
- Anondo Kutir (আনন্দ কুটির)
- Mr. Absent Minded (মিস্টার অ্যাবসেণ্ট মাইন্ডেড)
- Kokhono Megh Kokhono Brishty (কখনো মেঘ কখনো বৃষ্টি)
- Hridoyer Rong (হৃদয়ের রং)

2025

- Biyer Gondogol (বিয়ের গন্ডগোল)
- Dur Theke Valobashi (দূর থেকে ভালোবাসি)
- Tomay Pabo Ki (তোমায় পাবো কি?)
- Bhalobasha Sold Out (ভালোবাসা সোল্ড আউট)
- Sedin Chilo Shukrobar (সেদিন ছিলো শুক্রবার)
- Cholte Cholte (চলতে চলতে)
- Mon Dewana (মন দেওয়ানা)
- Hridoye Rekhechi Gopone (হৃদয়ে রেখেছি গোপনে)
- Agnishikha (অগ্নিশিখা)
- Kache Asar Somoy (কাছে আসার সময়)
- Hridoyer EK Kone (হৃদয়ের এক কোণে)
- Ki Mayay Jorale (কি মায়ায় জড়ালে)
- Bouer Biye (বউয়ের বিয়ে)
- Abir Chhoya (আবীর ছোয়া)
- Ami Sudhu Cheyechi Tumi (আমি শুধু চেয়েছি তোমায়)
- Darale Duyaare (দাড়ালে দুয়ারে)
- Shohorer Joto Rong (শহরের যত রং)
- Dujon Dujonar (দুজন দুজনার)
- O-Premer Kobita (অ-প্রেমের কবিতা)
- Golap Gram (গোলাপ গ্রাম)
- Voboghure Bhalobasha (ভবঘুরে ভালোবাসা)
- Prem Bhai (প্রেম ভাই)
- Breaking News (ব্রেকিং নিউজ)
- Priyo Priyosini (প্রিয় প্রিয়সিনী)
- Phire Dekha (ফিরে দেখা)
- Tumi Amar Chile (তুমি আমার ছিলে)
- Hridoyer Kotha (হৃদয়ের কথা)
- Phire Asha (ফিরে আসা)
- Mon Bodol (মন বদল)
- Chithi Diyo (চিঠি দিও)
- Alien Baby (এলিয়েন বেবী)
- Cholo Hariye Jai (চলো হারিয়ে যাই)
- Bhalo Theko (ভালো থেকো)
- Beshi Bole Bulbuli (বেশি বলে বুলবুলি)
- Shalik Balika (শালিক বালিকা)
- He-Me (হি-মি)
- Hridoyer Gobhire (হৃদয়ের গভীরে)
- #Love (হ্যাশটাগ লাভ)

2026

- Pashe Thakar Golpo (পাশে থাকার গল্প)
- Tomake Chai (তোমাকে চাই)
- Beshi Bole Bulbuli 2 (বেশি বলে বুলবুলি ২)
- Family Man (ফ্যামিলি ম্যান)
- Tumi Jokhon Ele (তুমি যখন এলে)
- Jani Dekha Hobe (জানি দেখা হবে)
- Priyo Naame Deko (প্রিয় নামে ডেকো)
- Ekmutho Sukh (একমুঠো সুখ)
- Bheja Chokh (ভেজা চোখ)
- P.O Box 144 (পি. ও. বক্স ১৪৪)
- Mon Foring (মন ফড়িং)
- Kosom (কসম)
- Churi (চুড়ি)
- Jokhom (জখম)
- Prem Priyoshi (প্রেম প্রিয়সী)
- Bhul Koreo Bhalobasha Hoy (ভুল করেও ভালোবাসা হয়)
- Tobuo Mon (তবুও মন)
- Not a Love Story (নট আ লাভ স্টোরি)
- Tor Mayay (তোর মায়ায়)
- Sutorang (সুতরাং)
- Tomar Amar Prem (তোমার আমার প্রেম)
- Kajol Chokher Meye (কাজল চোখের মেয়ে)
- Valobashar Golpo (ভালোবাসার গল্প)
- Omor Prem (অমর প্রেম)
- Pothhara Mon (পথহারা মন)
- Kabin Nama (কাবিননামা)
- Chuye Dilam Tomay (ছুয়ে দিলাম তোমায়)
- Mon Duniya (মন দুনিয়া)

== Awards and nominations ==
Year	Award	Category	Work	Result	Ref.
2023	Meril-Prothom Alo Award	Best actress	Somoy Sob Jane	Won	
2024	Deepto Award	Best actress	Bhalobashar Prothom Kodom Phool	Won	
2024	BIFA Award	Best Rising Star	—N/a	Won	
2025	Meril-Prothom Alo Awards	Best TV Actress	Love Sab	Won	
2026	Meril-Prothom Alo Awards	Best Actress (Limited-length fiction)	Bhalo Theko	Won	

== See also ==
- Sadia Ayman
