= Eta Amaderi Golpo =

- Poster
- Genre: Romantic drama
- Created by: Mohammad Mostafa Kamal Raz
- Screenplay by: Mohammad Mostafa Kamal Raz
- Story by: Mohammad Mostafa Kamal Raz
- Directed by: Mohammad Mostafa Kamal Raz
- Starring: Khairul Basar; Keya Payel; Irfan Sajjad; Sunerah Binte Kamal
- Music by: Arfin Rumey; Shariar Marcell; Prottoy Khan
- Country of origin: Bangladesh
- Original language: Bengali
- No. of seasons: 1
- No. of episodes: 52

Production
- Executive producer: AB Rokon
- Producer: Mohammad Mostafa Kamal Raz
- Cinematography: Aditto Monir
- Editor: Rashed Rabbi
- Running time: 25–30 minutes
- Production company: CINEMAWALA

Original release
- Network: Channel i
- Release: 5 November 2025 – 8 May 2026

Eta Amaderi Golpo (Bengali: এটা আমাদেরই গল্প, lit. 'It's our story') is a 2025 Bangladeshi romantic drama television series written, screenplay, produced and directed by Mohammad Mostafa Kamal Raz under the banner of CINEMAWALA. The series stars Khairul Basar, Keya Payel, Irfan Sajjad and Sunerah Binte Kamal in the lead role alongside Nader Chowdhury, Monira Mithu, Intekhab Dinar, Deepa Khandakar, Mahmudul Islam Mithu, Shilpi Sharkar Apu, Otithi Israt, Dicon Nur and others in the supporting role. The series received positive reception and widespread acclamation in the country.

It is as debut television series of Sunerah Binte Kamal. The television series are premiered from 5 November 2025, the new episodes of the series are premiered in every Tuesday and Wednesday at 9:30pm on Channel i and released in every Wednesday and Thursday at 12:00pm on the YouTube channel CINEMAWALA which are produced by Mohammad Mostafa Kamal Raz. The story of the series are inspired from the Pakistani television drama Kabhi Main Kabhi Tum (2024). The series was shot in Uttara, Dhaka. The final episode of Eta Amaderi Golpo will premiere on May 08, 2026 at 3.00 pm on Cinemawala's YouTube channel with 92 minutes of duration.

== Plot ==
The story revolves around the family of Mohammad Gulzar Ahmed (Nader Chowdhury), who lives in Uttara, Dhaka with his wife Anjuman (Monira Mithu), two sons Fahad (Irfan Sajjad) and Samir (Khairul Basar), sister Fatema (Deepa Khandakar) and Fatema's daughter Farhana (Otithi Israt). Fahad is skilled, qualified, hardworking and ambitious, who desperately wants to become rich in life, while Samir is dull, lazy, unemployed, ill-tempered and unambitious, who doesn't care about the future. Fatema's husband Rafiq (Intekhab Dinar) betrayed her after marriage when he goes abroad and develops extramarital relationship, after which she and her daughter started living with Gulzar Ahmed's family. Although Rafiq now regrets his actions, Gulzar Ahmed does not allow him to enter his house, for which he had to meet his wife and daughter secretly.

Fahad's girlfriend Mehreen (Keya Payel) is a simple, lovely, kindhearted and cultured woman who loves and wants to marry Fahad. Fahad worked in a big company owned by millionaire Iftekhar Chowdhury (Deacon Noor). Impressed by Fahad's intelligence and efficiency, Chowdhury promotes him to the position of director, but on the condition that he must marry his daughter Saira Chowdhury (Sunerah Binte Kamal), who is a modern, independent, westernized and narcissistic woman. Out of greed, Fahad breaks up with Mehreen, marries Saira and starts living in his in-laws' house.

On the other hand, Samir appears in the story and Mehreen, heartbroken, seeks his help, as Samir had previously promised to help Mehreen in trouble. Samir, initially hesitant, marries Mehreen without informing his family. Initially, Samir and Mehreen face problems with Samir's mother Anjuman, but her father, his aunt and his cousin sister liked Mehreen. As time passed, Mehreen wins Anjuman's heart, which makes Saira jealous of her. Mehreen also finds a fatherly affection in Gulzar Ahmed, as her father had died in her childhood and her relationship with her stepfather was not good at all. Mehreen's love also changes Samir and he starts freelancing, realizing his responsibility.

Meanwhile, Fahad frequently came home to visit his father, who was a patient of heart disease. This makes Saira suspect that her husband might have any feelings for Mehreen, although in reality there was no relationship between them after marriage. To investigate the matter, she temporarily moves to her in-laws', where she comes to know that Mehreen is Fahad's ex-girlfriend. She reveales this to the whole family, who were completely unaware of it. Upon hearing, Anjuman starts insulting Mehreen. When Samir comes forward to defend his wife, his father slaps and orders him to leave the house. Samir, feeling hurt, leaves the house with Mehreen.

Upon hearing this, Rafiq comes forward to help Samir and Mehreen, arranges a cheap rental house for them in an underdeveloped area of Dhaka and offers Samir a business to earn money. Although Samir hesitated at first, eventually accepts the offer. Mehreen also starts a job to support Samir. Samir cuts off all ties with his family and blocks them all on their phones so that they cannot not contact him or Mehreen, although Fatema and Farhana secretly keeps in touch with Mehreen through Rafiq. In the meantime, Mehreen's relationship with her stepfather also gets warmth.

On the other hand, Fahad, annoyed by Saira's constant suspicious and bossy behavior, develops an extramarital affair with a female office employee named Mira (Aditi Zaman Sneha). Another employee in his office, Jamshed (Mukit Zakaria), who was jealous of Fahad's success, reveals this to Saira, which makes Saira start suspecting her husband again. Meanwhile, Fahad invests in a company, whose owner Arif suddenly stops communicating with him for some unknown reason. In the meantime, Fahad secretly takes some money from the company and buys a villa in Dubai for himself and Mira. When Saira came to know about all this, she fires both Fahad and Mira from the office and threatens him to hand over to the police if they don't return the lost money within a week. Saira's self-absorbed and luxurious attitude also negatively affects her relationship with Fahad's family, who were already grieving the departure of Samir and Mehreen.

Fahad, now anxious and frightened and left with no other option, sells his father's house by faking signature. He returns the required amount to Saira and starts his own company with Mira to earn quick to recover his father's house. When his family came to know about this, they are completely devastated. Gulzar Ahmed, along with Anjuman, Fatema and Farhana, leaves Dhaka and return to their village home in the Gazipur District, which has been looked after by his distant nephew Abul (MNU Raju) and his wife Jyoti.

In the village, Gulzar Ahmed's health deteriorated further and he gets a stroke. Hearing the news, Rafiq comes to the village and apologizes to Gulzar Ahmed for betraying Fatema. Gulzar Ahmed, on his deathbed, forgives Rafiq. Rafiq then informed Samir about his father's condition. Samir, at Mehreen's request, breaks his anger and goes to the village to see his father. Gulzar Ahmed dies shortly after meeting Samir and Mehreen.

Meanwhile, months later, Arif suddenly contacts Fahad and apologizes for his hideout. He returns the money that Fahad invested, through which Fahad become finally able to recover his father's house in Dhaka. But then Fahad learns that his father has already died. Grief-stricken Fahad returns to the village to attend his father's funeral. Saira, who was already rethinking about Fahad, also goes to the village after hearing the news. Initially, Anjuman, frustrated with both of them, refuses to accept them at the funeral, but later agrees at the request of others. Both Fahad and Saira then apologize to Anjuman and promise to be together again. Anjuman forgives them and the family is finally reunited.

A few days later, when the family returns to their old home in Dhaka, they try to reunite Rafiq and Fatema. Fatema, who is disappointed with her fate and Rafiq, initially does not want to go back with Rafiq, but agrees to Farhana's plea. The family then begins to organize a symbolic wedding for Rafiq and Farhana. In the meantime, one day, Samir and Saira see Fahad thanking Mehreen for her contribution to the family. Both Samir and Saira get angry at seeing their spouses sweetly talking to each other's exes, and Samir even gets into a fight with Mehreen and Fahad. Another day, Mehreen confirms that she is pregnant and the entire family starts taking care of her, which makes Saira even more frustrated with her relationship with Fahad. On the day of the wedding, where Meera, Jamshed and others were also invited, Meera professes her love for Fahad. Fahad also says that he likes Meera. Jamshed secretly captures the moment and shows the video to Saira. Saira, being furious, slaps Meera in front of the guests in the middle of the ceremony and starts wailing Fahad while crying. When Anjuman tries to stop it, her health suddenly breaks down and she dies.

== Cast ==
- Khairul Basar as Samir, Meherin's husband
- Keya Payel as Afia Afroj "Meherin", Samir's wife and Fahad's ex-girlfriend
- Irfan Sajjad as Fahad, Samir's elder brother
- Sunerah Binte Kamal as Saira Chowdhury, Fahad's wife
- Nader Chowdhury as Mohammad Gulzar Ahmed, Samir and Fahad's father
- Monira Mithu as Anjuman Begum, Samir and Fahad's mother
- Intekhab Dinar as Rafiq, Fatema's ex-husband
- Deepa Khandakar as Fatema, Rafiq's wife
- Mahmudul Islam Mithu as Meherin's stepfather
- Shilpi Sharkar Apu as Afroj Binte Mariyam
- Dicon Noor as Iftekhar Chowdhury, Saira's father
- Mukit Zakaria as Jamshed
- Aditi Zaman Sneha as Meera
- Otithi Israt as Farhana, Rafiq and Fatema's daughter
- Inzam Mizu as Mizu, Samir's friend
- Ruzlan Ayaat as Mayaz, Meherin's stepbrother
- Shohagh Talukder
- Akbar as Akbar, Iftekhar Chowdhury's house worker
- MNU Raju as Abul
- Ejajul Islam as house byer and businessman

== Music ==
The series has three songs. The title track was composed and sung by Arfin Rumey and Dola Rahman and written by Mahmud Manzur. The 2nd song "She Manale" was composed and sung by Shahriar Marsel and written by Tarik Tuhin and the 3rd song "Janina" are composed and sung by Prattoy Khan with Sushmita and written by Siam Sarkar.

== Reception ==
=== Audience reception ===
The television serial Eta Amaderi Golpo achieved a significant milestone when its 18th episode surpassed one million views on YouTube within just one hour of release. Reported by Channel i, the broadcast on the Cinemawala YouTube channel generated extensive public interest, drawing widespread engagement and positive feedback across various social media platforms and online groups. According to another report by Channel i, the serial Eta Amaderi Golpo sparked widespread discussion for its revival of family-oriented emotional narratives. The publication noted that the production maintained strong audience engagement, with viewers eagerly watching each new episode immediately upon its YouTube release.

Report by Prothom Alo, the serial garnered significant attention on social media for its realistic portrayal of family struggles. The publication noted that the drama received widespread praise from audiences, who highlighted it as a compelling and emotionally resonant production suitable for family viewing. Report by The Daily Ittefaq, the serial received widespread appreciation on social media, with audiences highlighting it as a compelling production suitable for family viewing. The publication noted that viewers strongly resonated with the show's narrative and relatable characters. Newsbangla24 noted, the drama series Eta Amaderi Golpo generated significant enthusiasm within the contemporary entertainment industry. The publication noted that after a prolonged period, a family-centric narrative focusing on emotional bonds and relational tensions had received such an overwhelming response, with viewers eagerly watching each episode upon its release on the Cinemawala YouTube channel.

Protidiner Sangbad noted, the drama series Eta Amaderi Golpo became a significant commercial and cultural success, with individual episodes regularly securing 10 to 15 million views on YouTube. The report highlighted the show's strong presence on social media, where its dramatic dialogues and key characters including Sameer, Meherin, Fahad, and Anjuman Begum gained widespread recognition among family audiences. Another reported by Protidiner Sangbad, Deepa Khandakar received widespread audience acclaim for her fluent portrayal of Fatema, a divorced mother in drama series, her character serves as the aunt to protagonists played by Irfan Sajjad and Khairul Basar, with the narrative intensifying around the return of her husband, portrayed by Intekhab Dinar. The publication also noted that the series features an ensemble cast including Monira Mithu, Nader Chowdhury, Keya Payel, and Sunerah Binte Kamal in prominent roles.

Reported by Bangla TV, the family-centric drama series Eta Amaderi Golpo, sponsored by Rin Detergent Powder, received widespread appreciation from audiences for its depiction of familial relationships, love, and conflict. Reviewed by Prothom Alo highlighted, a significant resurgence in the popularity of Bangladeshi drama series on YouTube. The report noted that about the series, several productions topped online discussions and accumulated high viewership due to their innovative storytelling, realistic family dynamics, engaging character portrayals, and strong emotional connection with the audience, prompting anticipation for upcoming episodes.

Kalbela reported that Sajjad's (who played Fahad's character) emotional acting in the 50nd episode, which aired Gulzar Ahmed's (played by Nader Chowdhury) death and funeral, had brought tears in many viewers' eyes. Sajjad later shared a Facebook post where he stated that actor Ziaul Faruq Apurba personally phoned him and praised his acting, saying "didn't know you were so good at emotional acting!"

== Awards ==
Year	Award	Category	Name	Result	Ref.
2026	Meril-Prothom Alo Awards	Best Actor in television series	Khairul Basar	Nominated	
2026	Meril-Prothom Alo Awards	Best Actor in television series	Irfan Sajjad	Nominated	
2026	Meril-Prothom Alo Awards	Best Actress in television series	Sunerah Binte Kamal	Nominated	
2026	Meril-Prothom Alo Awards	Best TV Actress	Keya Payel	Won	
2026	Dhallywood Film and Music Awards	Best Supporting Actress	Deepa Khandakar	Won	
2026	BIFA Awards	Best TV Actor	Khairul Basar	Won	
2026	BIFA Awards	Best TV Actress	Keya Payel	Won	
2026	BIFA Awards	Breakthrough Performance (television)	Deepa Khandakar	Won	
