= Ostitto =

Bangladeshi romantic drama film

- Theatrical Release Poster
- অস্তিত্ব
- Directed by: Anonno Mamun
- Written by: Carlos Saleh
- Produced by: Carlos Saleh
- Starring: Arifin Shuvoo; Nusrat Imrose Tisha; Farhan Ahmed Jovan; Samoty Shoumi
- Cinematography: Venkat Gangadhikari
- Edited by: Akramul Haq
- Music by: Ibrar Tipu, Pritom Hasan, Naved Parvez, Adhyan Dhara, Akassh
- Production company: Dream Box LTD.
- Distributed by: Action Cut Entertainment
- Release date: 6 May 2016
- Running time: 146 minutes
- Country: Bangladesh
- Language: Bengali

Ostitto (transl. Eternal) is a 2016 Bangladeshi romantic drama film directed by Anonno Mamun. The film stars Nusrat Imrose Tisha as an intellectually disabled girl and Arifin Shuvoo as her mentor. The plot centers on the love story of two youths, and the struggle of a mentor who helps intellectually disabled children to win an Olympic medal. Ostitto was released on 6 May 2016 in Bangladesh. The film received positive reviews from critics, who praised its performance and execution. The director announced in 2017 that Ostitto 2 will be released with new faces.

== Cast ==
- Arifin Shuvoo as Imtu
- Nusrat Imrose Tisha as Pori
- Nijhum Rubina as Orsha
- Shuchorita as Mrs. Afsana, Pori's mother
- Subrata as Mr. Jamil, Pori's father
- Sujata as Pori's grandmother
- Farhan Ahmed Jovan as Purno "Poo", Pori's brother
- Samonty Shoumi as Zara
- Don as Joga Bhai
- Tanzira Noor as Imtu's sister
- Jacky Alamgir as Ramiz
- Badol as Jalil

== Production ==
"I had to study the autistic students for my role," said Tisha. "This is completely a new experience for me," she added.

== Music ==
All lyrics are written by Kabir Bakul, Adhyan Dhara, Zahid Akbar, Mehadi Hasan Limon, Arzeen Kamal and Priyo Chattopadhyay, The hit song, Ayna Bolna is composed by Naved Parvez

== Release ==
The film was released on 6 May 2016 in more than 65 screens across Bangladesh. The film opened to a positive response at the theaters. It was popular across generations, especially among young or university-age viewers. However, it was criticized by some for the quality of its editing. It performed below average at the box office.

List of awards and nominations
Ciromonies	Year	Category	Recipients and nominees	Result	Ref.(s)
Meril-Prothom Alo Awards	2016	Best Film Actress	Nusrat Imrose Tisha	Nominated	
National Film Awards	2016	Best Film Actress	Nusrat Imrose Tisha	Won	

== See also ==
- Dhallywood
