= Fakhruzzaman Chowdhury =

Bangladeshi author (1940-2014)

- Born: 5 January 1940; Dhaka, Bangladesh
- Died: 12 June 2014 (aged 74)
- Occupation: Author
- Years active: 1956–2006
- Spouses: Dilara Zaman (m. 1966)

Fakhruzzaman Chowdhury (5 January 1940 – 12 June 2014) was a Bangladeshi author. He served as the director of Bangladesh Television. He was awarded Bangla Academy Literary Award, the highest literary award in Bangladesh in 2005.

== Early life and education ==
Fakhruzzaman was born in 1940 in a reputed family in Comilla. He completed his secondary studies at Jagannath College in 1957, honors from Dhaka University in 1960 and masters in 1961 from the same university.

== Career ==
After completing his studies, Fakhruzzaman Chowdhury joined as a research fellow in Dhaka University. Then he became the director of Bangladesh Television. During thus time, he became a professional writer and translator. He primarily wrote child literature. He went on to write over 30 books.

== Literary works ==
=== Poetry ===
- Anabaz (1986)
- Door Diganta (1986)
- Palestine Protirodher Golpo (1994)

=== Novels ===
- Jonaronye Koyekjon (1990)
- Eka O Ekaki (1994)

=== Dramas ===
- Yarma (1991)

=== Articles ===
- Lekhoker Kotha: Part 1 (1992)
- Lekhoker Kotha: Part 2 (2003)

=== Child literature ===
- Haar Kipte Buri (1956)
- Rip Van Winkle (1956)
- In The Court of King Arther (1968)
- King of Magic Hudini (1988)
- Uncle Tom's Cabin (1993)
- Around The World In 80 Days (1993)
- Hunchbeck of Notre Dame (1995)
- Treasure Island (1998)

=== Biography ===
- Dilan Thomas (1985)
- Ali Ashraf Khan (1988)
- Azizur Rahman (1989)

=== History ===
- Abichar (1984)
- Oirabot O Ankush (1993)

=== Translation ===
- Bikikinir Prem (1992)
- He Dukkho Biday (1993)
- Robinson Crussoe (2006)

== Personal life ==
Fakhruzzaman Chowdhury was married to television actress Dilara Zaman. He was the elder brother of renowned poet and lyricist Ahmed Zaman Chowdhury, who has written some timeless songs for Bangladeshi films.

== Death ==
Fakhruzzaman Chowdhury died on 12 June 2014 at the age of 74. His wife Dilara Zaman confirmed that he had suffered from chronic obstructive pulmonary disease.

== Awards ==
- Bangla Academy Literary Award (translation) – 2005
- Agrani Bank Child Literature Award – 1993
