= Kaberi Gayen =

Bangladeshi academic, author, and social activist

- কাবেরী গায়েন
- Born: Barisal, East Pakistan, Pakistan
- Education: University of Dhaka (BA, MA); Edinburgh Napier University (PhD)
- Occupation: academic
- Years active: 1994 - present
- Known for: Social activism
- Notable work: Muktijuddher Cholochchitre Naree Nirman

Kaberi Gayen is a Bangladeshi academic, author, and social activist known for her outspoken views on the oppression of minorities and gender inequality in Bangladesh.

She is a professor of the Department of Mass Communication and Journalism at the University of Dhaka, as well as a visiting lecturer at Edinburgh Napier University, United Kingdom.

== Early life ==
Gayen was born in a Bengali Kayastha family in Gopalganj, Bangladesh. She did her schooling from Barisal Government Women's College, and travelled to Dhaka in 1989 to obtain an honours degree in mass communication and journalism from the University of Dhaka - for which she was awarded the Dil Noshin Khanam Gold Medal. She then completed her master's from the same university in 1990, thereafter travelling to Edinburgh to obtain a PhD from Edinburgh Napier University in 2004. Her thesis was on Modelling the Influence of Communications on Fertility Behaviour of Women in Rural Bangladesh.

== Career ==
Gayen is a full-time professor at the Department of Mass Communication and Journalism of University of Dhaka. She is also visiting lecturer at Edinburgh Napier University, United Kingdom. She is a member of the International Network for Social Network Analysis and Asiatic Society of Bangladesh, as well as a columnist for various national newspapers, including the Bangladeshi English-language newspapers The Daily Star and Prothom Alo. She was awarded the European Union grant in 2004, to work on the "Social Network of Older Workers". In 2011, she received the prestigious Royal Society of Edinburgh grant, and was subsequently invited to present lectures at Dundee University and Edinburgh University. Johannes Karl Mühl, the German academic from Hochschule Furtwangen University, credited her with helping him write his book "Organizational Trust: Measurement, Impact, and the Role of Management Accountants".

== Social activism ==
Gayen is a vocal human rights activist who has spoken for the rights of the Hindu, Christian, and Atheist minorities, such as the atheist blogger Asif Mohiuddin. She has campaigned for justice in the Bangladeshi Judiciary, and is vocal against religious extremism and government oppression. She has supported The International Crimes Tribunal in Bangladesh. She has protested against the arrest of Labour rights activists and spoken against the issues of gender-inequality and sexual assault prevalent in the Bangladeshi society.

=== Militant threat ===
She was one of the ten people who received death threats from Islamist terrorists Ansarullah Bangla Team. The List included HT Imam - advisor to the Prime Minister of Bangladesh, Vice-Chancellor of Dhaka University, and Professor Muhammed Zafar Iqbal. The Militant group had also admitted to the murder of blogger Avijit Roy.

== Bibliography ==
=== Books ===
- Gayen, Kaberi (2009). Modelling Influences of Communication: A Study of the Fertility Behaviour of Women in Rural Bangladesh. Koln, Germany: LAMBERT Academic Publishing. ISBN 978-3838304700.
- Construction of Women in the War Films of Bangladesh (Muktizuddher Cholochchitre Naree Nirman). Dhaka, Bangladesh: Bengal Publications Limited. 2013.
- Capabilities and Vulnerabilities of Women Garment Workers of Bangladesh. Bangladesh: University Press Limited. 2015. (in the process of printing)

=== Conference papers ===
- Gayen, K. and. Raeside. R. 2005. "Kinship Networks and Contraception in Rural Bangladesh ", published in the Proceedings of XXV IUSSP International Population Conference 2005, Tours, France.
- Raeside, R. and Gayen. K. 2005. "The Experience of Elderly", published in the Proceedings of XXV IUSSP International Population Conference 2005, Tours, France. Also available: Princeton University
