= Samraat: The King Is Here =

2016 Bangladeshi film directed by Mohammad Mostafa Kamal Raz

- Directed by: Mohammad Mostafa Kamal Raz
- Screenplay by: Mohammad Mostafa Kamal Raz
- Story by: Mohammad Mostafa Kamal Raz
- Produced by: Zahid Hasan Abhi
- Starring: Shakib Khan; Apu Biswas; Indraneil Sengupta; Misha Sawdagor
- Cinematography: Chandan Roy Chowdhury
- Edited by: Mohammad Kalam
- Music by: Hridoy Khan
- Production companies: Tiger Media Limited; Orkee Production; CINEMAWALA
- Distributed by: Tiger Media Limited
- Release date: 7 July 2016
- Country: Bangladesh
- Language: Bengali

Samraat: The King Is Here is a 2016 Bangladeshi Bengali-language action crime thriller film directed by Mohammad Mostafa Kamal Raz and produced by Tiger Media Limited in association with Orkee Production and CINEMAWALA. Shakib Khan played the titular role, a leader of Bangladeshi organised crime syndicate operating from Malaysia, with Apu Biswas, Indraneil Sengupta and Misha Sawdagor in lead roles. The film narrates the fall of two notorious underworld mafia leaders.

The film marked the 72nd film of Shakib Khan and Apu Biswas as a duo. The first look teaser of the film was released on 6 August 2015, and the official trailer was released on 27 June 2016. It was released in Bangladesh on 7 July 2016.

== Cast ==
- Shakib Khan as Samraat; the leader of a Bangladeshi organised crime syndicate operating from Malaysia.
- Apu Biswas as Ruhi; a doctor
- Indraneil Sengupta as Raja; an undercover police officer
- Misha Sawdagor as Musa
- Kabila as Kabila
- Shimul Khan as Rocket
- Subrata as police commissioner
- DJ Sohel as Jahangir Khan
- Emon as Rabbi (special appearance)

== Production ==
The team began filming on 1 July 2015 at the BFDC in Dhaka, where the title song featuring Shakib Khan and Apu Biswas was shot in a set up by art director Samurai Maruf and choreographer Shibram Sarma. The team then set up base in Aftab Nagar & Uttara for a 14-day stint, with Indian actor Indraneil Sengupta, Misha Sawdagor and hundreds of extras and technicians gathered.

A second schedule continued throughout 14 August 2015 at Coke Studio in Dhaka, where a romantic song featuring Indraneil Sengupta and Apu Biswas was shot, after which it was reported that the film was 60 percent complete. By December 2015, it was reported that the film's shooting was completed, and from December the post production was started.

== Soundtrack ==
Samraat: The King Is Here (Original Motion Picture Soundtrack)

Soundtrack album by Arfin Rumey, Imran, Savvy & Dabbu
- Released: 1 December 2015
- Genre: Feature Film Soundtrack
- Length: 32:01
- Label: Tiger Media Limited
- Producer: Tiger Media Limited

The soundtrack for Samraat is composed by Arfin Rumey, Imran Mahmudul, Savvy, and Dabbu. The soundtrack includes a total of 7 tracks, with 5 original tracks written by Johny Hoque, Robiul Islam Jibon, Zahid Hasan Abhi, Riddhi & Anup Kumar Biswas, with Arfin Rumey, Imran, Shadaab Hashmi, Konal & Satrujit Dasgupta as playback singers. Along with the 5 original tracks, the soundtrack also includes an unplugged version of "Dujone", as well as instrumental versions of "Dujone" and "Raatbhor". The official soundtrack was released on 1 December 2015.

Track listing
No.	Title	Lyrics	Music	Singer(s)	Length
1.	"Samraat The King Is Here" (Title Track)	Johny Hoque	Dabbu	Satrujit Dasgupta	4:30
2.	"Raatbhor" (Romantic Track)	Robiul Islam Jibon	Imran Mahmudul	Imran Mahmudul	4:42
3.	"Dujone" (Romantic Track)	Riddhi Barua	Savvy	Shadaab Hashmi	4:29
4.	"Niswas" (Duet)	Zahid Hasan Abhi	Arfin Rumey	Arfin Rumey, Konal	4:35
5.	"The King Is Here" (End Credit Song)	Anup Kumar Biswas	Arfin Rumey	Arfin Rumey	2:00
6.	"Dujone" (Unplugged)	Riddhi Barua	Savvy	Savvy	3:47
7.	"Dujone" (Instrumental)		Savvy	Savvy	4:29
8.	"Raatbhor" (Instrumental)		Imran Mahmudul	Alvee Ali	1:17

== Release ==
The film received censor clarification without any objection on 23 June 2016.
