= Taarkata =

- Taarkata Theatrical poster
- Directed by: Mohammad Mostafa Kamal Raz
- Written by: Mohammad Mostafa Kamal Raz
- Produced by: Shukla Banik
- Starring: Arifin Shuvoo; Bidya Sinha Saha Mim; Moushumi; Faruque Ahmed; Dr. Ezazul Islam; Ahmed Sharif
- Edited by: Farhad Ahmed
- Music by: Arfin Rumey; Hasin Mahtab
- Distributed by: Jaaz Multimedia; Ping Pong Entertainment
- Release date: 6 June 2014
- Country: Bangladesh

Taarkata is a 2014 Bangladeshi romantic thriller film written and directed by Mohammad Mostafa Kamal Raz, starring Arifin Shuvoo, Bidya Sinha Saha Mim with Moushumi, Faruque Ahmed, Dr. Ezazul Islam and Ahmed Sharif in supporting roles. The film was produced by Shukla Banik under Ping Pong Entertainment banner. It was the third direction of Mohammad Mostafa Kamal Raz, and second collaboration between Arifin Shuvoo and Mohammad Mostafa Kamal Raz after Chaya Chobi.

The story centers around Ibrahim, a notorious criminal who falls in love with a simple girl, an aspiring singer who comes from a middle-class family. The first part of the film explores the events which led to Ibrahim becoming a criminal. The second part of the film introduces the antagonist.

== Synopsis ==
The story centers around a middle class brother and sister, Ibrahim (Arifin Shuvoo) and Moushumi, and their family. Ibrahim becomes involved in illegal activities with a gang and causes others to be fearful when he acted as a Mafia don. He becomes romantically involved with Chad (Bidya Sinha Saha Mim), an aspiring singer who comes from a middle-class family. It is an action film with romance, starring three very capable stars.

== Cast ==
- Arifin Shuvoo as Ibrahim aka Ibu
- Bidya Sinha Saha Mim as Chad
- Moushumi as Ibrahim's elder sister
- Faruque Ahmed as Aslam Sheikh
- Dr.Ezazul Islam as Musa Raj
- Omar Sani as his late brother-in-law
- Lubaba Diya as the child artist
- Ahmed Sharif
- Hasan Masood as Suruj Khan
- Kochi Khondokar
- Md. Nazim Uddin Raju
- Zoya Chatterjee
- Md. Matiur Rahman
- Bablu Bosh
- Monir Hossain
- Mohammad Majedul Haque Rana
- A.B. Rokon
- Sajib Neev
- Parijat Chokroborty

== Music ==
The music of the film has been composed by Arifin Rumey. Music has been produced under the banner of Laser Vision. The music was released on 10 April 2014. The album consists of 12 tracks.

Taarkata

Soundtrack album by Arfin Rumey, Puja, Baby Naznin, Liza, Naumi and more
- Released: 2014
- Genre: Feature film soundtrack
- Length: 38:26 min

No.	Title	Artist(s)	Length
1.	"Taarkata (Title Track)"	Dilshad Nahar Kona, Parvez	6:14
2.	"Tumihina"	Arfin Rumey & Liza, & Naumi	6:42
3.	"Jalsa Ghor"	Palak Muchhal	5:18
4.	"Bondhon"	Sunidhi Chauhan	6:20
5.	"Noyon Moni"	Arfin Rumey, Baby Naznin	5:55
6.	"Ghagra"	Mamta Sharma	4:20
7.	"Ami Tumi"	Arfin Rumey, Puja	4:17
Total length:			38:26

** The film version duration may differ from original audio album
