= Farhan Ahmed Jovan =

Bangladeshi film actor, television personality and model

- ফারহান আহমেদ জোভান
- Born: 18 September 1992 (age 34); Dinajpur, Rangpur Division, Bangladesh
- Occupations: Film actor; television personality; model
- Years active: 2012–present
- Spouse: Sajin Ahmed Nirjona (m. 2024)

Farhan Ahmed Jovan (born 18 September 1992) is a Bangladeshi television and film actor and model. He started his acting career by appearing in the TV drama University (2012). He made his film debut on big screen with the film Ostitto (2016).

== Early life ==
Farhan Ahmed Jovan was born in Dinajpur. He has two younger siblings. Their father, a businessman, has worked in the United States since 2014. As of 2015, Jovan was enrolled in the BBA program at United International University in Dhaka.

== Personal life ==
Jovan married Sajin Ahmed Nirjona on 12 January 2024.

== Acting career ==
Jovan started his career in 2011 as a model in a television advertisement for Bangladeshi food brand Pran. Two years later he made his television show debut on Atiq Zaman's series University. His music video Ichchey Manush from the drama Shawon Gaanwala was the fifth most viewed Bangladeshi song on YouTube in 2016.

== Filmography ==
Key
†	Denotes films that have not yet been released

Year	Film	Role	Notes	Ref.
2016	Ostitto	Purno "Poo"	Debut film	
2023	Pori	Antik	Won – BFDA Awards for Best Actor; released on Deepto TV	
2025	Tomader Golpo	Ratul	Won – Meril-Prothom Alo Awards for Best TV Actor; released on YouTube	
2026	Shomporker Golpo	Iqbal	Released on YouTube	
2026	Tomader Golpo 2	Ratul	Released on Channel i	

=== Web series ===
Year	Title	Role	OTT Platform	Notes	Ref.
2019	Morichika	Juwel	Chorki	Debut web series	

== Television ==
- University
- Nine and a Half
- Jhalamuri
- House No. 44
- Rabbu Bhai Bau
- Brothers
- Na-Manush
- Nagardola
- Ekhon Onek Raat
- Masti Reloaded
- Deyaler Opare
- Ami Tumi
- Moments (short)
- It is my love story
- Jonakir Alo
- Tithir Atithi
- Chowdhury and Sons
- Tarun Turki
- Shunyata
- Back Bencher
- Noy Choy
- Brishtider Bari
- Ashomoyer Brittey
- Maya (short)
- Valentine's Gift
- Baghbondi
- Obosheshe amra
- Brothers 2
- Crossing
- Best Friend
- Kinchit Somossa
- Dekha
- A Love Story
- Ekdin Brishtite
- Je Golper Shesh Nei
- Bhalobasha Emono Hoy
- Vule vora golpo
- Bhor Hote Ektu Baki
- Abegi Megher Vitor
- Tui Thekey Tumi
- Detective Love
- Brishchik-The Scorpion
- Somudramanob
- Bhalobashar Nilam
- Eshan
- Best Friend 2
- Ekti valo golper khoje
- Little Rome Cafe (short)
- Amra korbo joy
- Abujh Mon
- Network pacchi na
- Prem ekattor
- Dearing Caring
- Gohona
- Cholo Na Harai
- Best Friend 3
- Bikal Belar Chad
- Keo Karo Noy
- Baba Tomake Bhalobashi
- Maayer Daak
- Amar Birthday
- Morichika
- Shunte Ki Pau Tumi
- Palai Palai
- Brothers 3
- Jol Rong
- Year Mate
- LOVE SEMESTER
- Good Boy
- Copy Paste
- Eid Card
- Friendship Goal
- Love You Hate You
- MONEY MACHINE
- Kabor
- Akjon Valo Manush
- Tomake Chai
- CRUSH & CONFESSION
- Monjora
- Bouer Bari
- Dekha Hobe Bondhu
- Ashiqui
- Pallu Billur Biye
- Tomar Amar Prem
- Kajol Chokher Meye

== Awards and nominations ==
Year	Awards	Category	Work	Result	Ref.
2026	BIFA Awards	Best Actor	Family Man	Won	
