= Morichika (TV series) =

Bangladeshi streaming television series

- Genre: Crime thriller
- Directed by: Shihab Shaheen
- Country of origin: Bangladesh
- Original language: Bengali
- No. of seasons: 1
- No. of episodes: 8

Production
- Editor: Jobayar Abir Peal

Original release
- Network: Chorki
- Release: 21 July 2021

Morichika is a Bangladeshi crime thriller streaming television series directed by Shihab Shaheen. It aired on Chorki on 12 July 2021.

== Cast ==
- Afran Nisho as Salaam Sharif Babu
- Mahiya Mahi as Bonni, an established model
- Siam Ahmed as Police Officer Shakil
- Farhan Ahmed Jovan as Jewel
- Abdullah Rana as Shakil's Boss at office
- Naresh Bhuiyan as Police Officer Rafique
- A.K. Azad Shetu as Police Officer Mojid
- Naznin Hasan Chumki is Bonni's Choreographer and Mentor
- Chanchal Mahmud
- Farzana Rikta

== Release ==
Chorki dropped the trailer of the series on 2 June 2021 on social media. And the series was premiered on 12 July 2021 on the launching day of Chorki.

== Reception ==
Morichika received mostly negative reviews from the audience. While reviewing for The Business Standard, Sayed Arafat Zubayer praised the direction, cinematography, and the background score of the series.

== Awards ==
Year	Award Title	Category	Awardee	Result	Ref
2022	Blender's Choice–The Daily Star Awards	Best actor in Negative Role	Afran Nisho	Won	
