= Monira Mithu =

Bangladeshi actress

- মনিরা মিঠু
- Born: Monira Mithu
- Occupation: Actress
- Relatives: Challenger (brother)
- Awards: 11th Meril-Prothom Alo Awards for Best TV Actress (2009)

Monira Mithu (Bengali: মনিরা মিঠু), also credited as Monira Akter Mithu, is a Bangladeshi television and film actress. She is known for her acting in television dramas, films and web series in Bangladesh and has been active in the entertainment industry for over two decades.

== Career ==
Mithu began her acting career in television. Her first role was in the drama Openty Bioscope, which was directed by Humayun Ahmed. This early work helped her gain recognition in the Bangladeshi television industry. She became widely known for her performances in many television dramas and series. Over the years, she established a reputation for portraying a range of characters, often cast in roles such as mother figures or elder relatives.

== Works ==
=== Television dramas ===
- Openty Bioscope (2001)
- Nil Towale
- Emon Deshti Kothao Khujey Pabey Nako Tumi
- Spartacus Ekattor
- House Full
- Bikol Pakhir Gaan
- Bua Bilash
- Coming Soon
- Putul Khela
- Chand Phool Omaboshya
- Traffic Signal (2016)
- Choita Pagol
- Baatpar
- Terminal
- Moina Todonto
- Jhornar Gaan
- Char Dukone Char
- Cheleti Abol Tabol Meyeti Pagol Pagol
- Bachelor Point
- Family Crisis
- Chan Biriyani
- Bibaho Hobe
- House No.96 (2021)
- Family Crisis Reloaded
- Shanti Molom 10 Taka (2022)
- Eta Amaderi Golpo (2025)
- Shomporker Golpo (2026)
- Tomader Golpo 2 (2026)

=== Films ===
- Chandrokotha (2003)
- Amar Ache Jol (2008)
- Gohine Shobdo (2010)
- Meherjaan (2011)
- Poramon (2013)
- Jonakir Alo (2014)
- Bhaijaan Elo Re (2018)
- Dahan (2018)
- Bishwoshundori (2020)
- Jole Jwole Tara (2025) as Tara's Mother
- Malik (2026)
- Dodor Golpo (TBA)

=== Web series ===
Year	Title	OTT	Character	Co-Stars	Director	Notes
2020	August 14	Binge	Shanta Islam	Tasnuva Tisha, Shahiduzzaman Selim, Shatabdi Wadud, Tanvir, Shawon	Shihab Shaheen	
2021	C For Coaching			Hasan Masood, Prottoy Heron, Anamika Oyshee, Rayhan Khan, Ahsan Habib Niloy, Rashed Amran, Tanvir Niloy, SM Samiul Alam, Sagar Huda	Mabrur Rashid Bannah	

== Awards ==
- Meril Prothom Alo Award for Best TV Actress (2009)
