= Jinn (2023 film) =

2023 Bangladeshi Film

- First Poster
- Directed by: Nader Chowdhury
- Screenplay by: Abdullah Zahir Babu
- Story by: Abdul Aziz
- Produced by: Abdul Aziz; Alimullah Khokon
- Starring: Shajal Noor; Puja Cherry; Ziaul Roshan; Jannatun Nur Moon
- Cinematography: Saiful Shahin
- Edited by: Mohammad Kalam
- Music by: Javed Ahmed Kislu
- Production company: Jaaz Multimedia
- Distributed by: Jaaz Multimedia
- Release date: 22 April 2023
- Country: Bangladesh
- Language: Bengali

Jinn is a 2023 Bangladeshi horror comedy film. The film was directed by Nader Chowdhury and co-produced by Abdul Aziz and Alimullah Khokon under the banner of Jaaz Multimedia. It features Ziaul Roshan and Puja Cherry in the lead roles with Shajal, Jannatun Nur Moon and Shahid un Nabi playing important roles in the film. The principal photography of film begun in August 2019.

== Cast ==
- Shajal as Rafsan "Raf", a professional photographer
- Puja Cherry as Mona, Rafsan's wife
- Ziaul Roshan as Bijoy
- Jannatun Nur Moon as Tanuja
- Shahid-Un-Nabi
- Sujata

== Soundtrack ==
Jin

Soundtrack album by Javed Ahmed Kislu
- Released: 2020
- Genre: Feature Film Soundtrack
- Language: Bengali
- Label: Jaaz Multimedia
- Producer: Javed Ahmed Kislu

The soundtrack of film composed by Javed Ahmed Kislu.

Track Listing
No.	Title	Lyrics	Singer(s)	Length
1.	"Jin" (title track)	Gazi Mazharul Anwar	Kishore Das, Dithi Anwar	3:01

== Release ==
Jaaz Multimedia tried many times to release this movie in theatres. First in Victory Day 2019, then tried to release on Valentine's Day 2020. The film was later finally released on the Eid-ul-Fitr Day in April 22, 2023 in 15 cinema halls.
