= Pett Kata Shaw =

2022 Bangladeshi horror web series

- Genre: Horror
- Written by: Nuhash Humayun
- Directed by: Nuhash Humayun
- Starring: See below
- Country of origin: Bangladesh
- Original language: Bengali
- No. of seasons: 2
- No. of episodes: 8

Production
- Executive producers: Rimon Hussain Khan; Abrar Jahin Rafee
- Producer: Redoan Rony
- Production location: Dhaka
- Cinematography: Tahsin Rahman
- Editor: Fuad Shourav
- Running time: 24–31 mins
- Production company: Chorki

Original release
- Network: Chorki
- Release: 7 April 2022

Pett Kata Shaw is a 2022 Bangladeshi horror web series written and directed by Nuhash Humayun. The series was released on online video-on-demand platform Chorki. Sohail Mondal, Shirin Akter Shila, Afzal Hossain, Chanchal Chowdhury, Pritom Hasan and Novera Rahman acted in the lead roles. The series presents modern retellings of traditional Bengali folktales passed down from generation to generation.

It had its international premiere as part of the official selection at the International Film Festival Rotterdam in 2023.

== Cast ==
- Shohel Mondol
- Shirin Akter Shila
- Ekram Khan Emu
- Durjoy Roy
- Witness Shahid
- Soumik Bose
- Afzal Hossain
- Chanchal Chowdhury
- Quazi Nawshaba Ahmed
- Khaled Ahmed Rumi
- Momo Ali
- Maymuna Islam Medha
- Mohana Hossain
- Rafayatullah Sohan
- Morshed Mishu
- Saida Taslima Hasan Nodi
- Pranay Dev Uchshas
- Taufiqul Iman
- Gitshree Chowdhury
- Pritam Hasan
- Masuda Khan
- Novera Rahman
- Nabil Nasser
- Abir
- Hussain
- Murtaza Zubair

== Episodes ==
No. in season	Title	Directed by	Written by	Original release date
1	"Ei Buildinge Meye Nishedh"	Nuhash Humayun	Nuhash Humayun	7 April 2022
A lonely young man named Hassan cooks fish at home one night and discovers a mysterious visitor in his room. He realizes that a ghost has come home and killed his friend Shafayat. He decides to cook the fish and feed it quickly to avoid becoming the ghost's feast himself.
2	"Mishti Kichu"	Nuhash Humayun	Nuhash Humayun	14 April 2022
Mahmud, a sweet seller, is despondent. He encounters a night shopper who promises to fulfill one of his wishes in exchange for delightful sweets. At first, Mahmud is surprised to see each wish come true, but soon the sweet surprises turn to bitterness. He realizes that he must be cautious of the tricks of the mind.
3	"Loke Bole"	Nuhash Humayun	Nuhash Humayun	21 April 2022
A wandering couple arrives at a village, the origin of every Bengali superstition, each one stranger than the last. A particularly notable superstition is the story about going out with open hair after dusk.
4	"Nishir Daak"	Nuhash Humayun	Nuhash Humayun	28 April 2022
An NGO worker in Cox's Bazar encounters a mysterious tale of missing children. According to the story, the sea is responsible for the disappearance of these children, who are never found again.

== Reception ==
Shah Nahian of The Business Standard criticised its first episode but praised the storytelling ability and music of the web series. Fatin Hamama from The Daily Star said, "All things considered, Pett Kata Shaw definitely did reinvent Bangladeshi horror, a genre that's been woefully under-explored until now".
