= Jodi Ekdin (2019 film) =

2019 film directed by Mohammad Mostafa Kamal Raz

Jodi Ekdin (The Sacrifice)
- Jodi Ekdin Movie Poster
- Directed by: Mohammad Mostafa Kamal Raz
- Written by: Asad Zaman
- Produced by: Bengal Multimedia Limited
- Starring: Tahsan Khan; Srabanti Chatterjee; Taskeen Rahman
- Edited by: MD Kalam
- Music by: Naved Parvez
- Production companies: CINEMAWALA; Bengal Multimedia Limited
- Distributed by: Bengal Multimedia Limited
- Release date: 8 March 2019
- Running time: 135 minutes
- Country: Bangladesh
- Language: Bengali

Jodi Ekdin: The Sacrifice is a 2019 Bangladeshi family drama film directed by Mohammad Mostafa Kamal Raz and produced by Bengal Multimedia Limited. The main cast in this movie are Tahsan, Srabanti, Taskeen and child actor Afrin Shikha Raisa.

== Plot ==
The story of the film is based on a family. It illustrates another kind of affection for parents. In the movie, Onik played the role of father Faisal and Afrin Shikha in the role of Rupkotha.

== Cast ==
- Tahsan Rahman Khan as Faisal
- Srabanti Chatterjee as Aritri Ashraf
- Taskeen Rahman as Jamie
- Fakhrul Bashar Masum as Hanif
- Saberi Alam
- Afrin Shikha Raisa as Rupkotha

== Music ==
The main music director of this movie is Naved Parvez and the movie songs was composed and sung by Hridoy Khan.

== Release and reception ==
The film was initially released in 22 theaters.

Al Faruque Rahul of Dhaka Tribune wrote, "Tahsan Khan’s debut film Jodi Ekdin is a treat for all its viewers. It is high in entertainment value—objectively speaking—and subjectively, the reasons why it is entertaining is the topic of raucous debate among Tahsan’s fans and lovers of Bangladeshi cinema".
