= Jagonews24.com =

Bangladeshi online news portal

Jagonews24.com জাগো নিউজ
- Online address for objective news
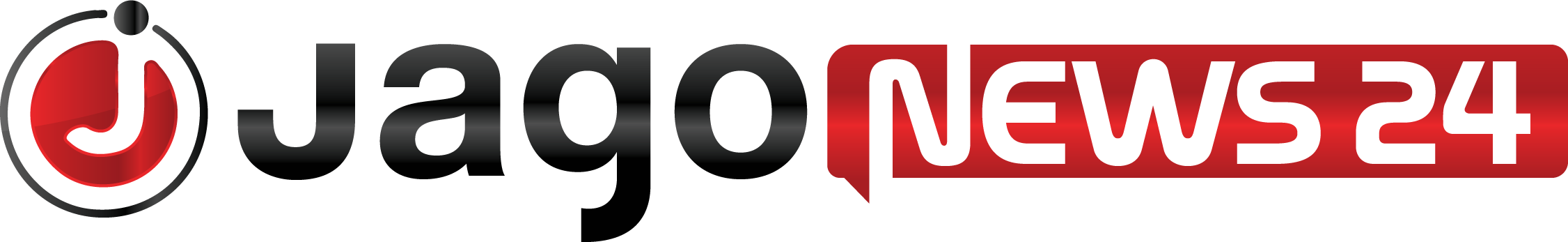
- Jagonews24.com logo
- Type: Online Newspaper
- Format: Mobile & web
- Owner: AKC (PVT) LTD.
- Publisher: Ahsan Khan Chowdhury, (head of PRAN-RFL Group)
- Editor: Zeaul Haque
- Founded: 14 May 2014; 12 years ago
- Language: Bengali; English
- Headquarters: Azhar Comfort Complex, Ga-130/A Pragati Sarani, Middle Badda, Dhaka, Bangladesh
- City: Dhaka 1212
- Country: Bangladesh
- Website: jagonews24.com

Jagonews24.com is an online Bengali language news portal in Bangladesh. Launched on 10 May 2014, the portal is owned by AKC Private Limited. As of July 2021, Similar Web ranked the website 1,351st worldwide and 8th in Bangladesh, placing it in 13th place overall amongst news-related websites in Bangladesh.

== History ==
Jagonews24.com officially launched on 10 May 2014 with the slogan "home of online objective news". K M Zeaul Haque is serving as its acting Editor. The portal started the publication of printed Eid Edition in 2015. In the same year, it launched an online campaign to recognize Bengali as one of the Official languages of the United Nations.

== Awards and recognition ==
In 2024, Jagonews24 journalist Touhiduzzaman Tanmoy received the CRAB Media Award in the awareness reporting category.

In 2025, Jagonews24 journalist Nazmul Hossain received the SME Media Award in the cluster-based development category for SME sector reporting.

== Representative Conference 2026 ==
The Jago News Representative Conference 2026 was a day-long conference organized by the online news portal Jago News 24 in September 2026. Representatives working for Jago News from its Dhaka office and different parts of Bangladesh participated in the conference.

The conference featured several sessions and discussions on journalism, including investigative and special reporting at the grassroots level, challenges in journalism, and techniques for writing online news headlines and introductions.

The conference also recognized representatives for their work and contributions in reporting from different parts of Bangladesh. The day-long event concluded with closing remarks.

Jago News Representative Conference 2026

== Video ==
- Jago News Representative Conference 2026 — Jago News 24
- Jago News Representative Conference 2026 — YouTube
