= Nader Chowdhury =

Bangladeshi actor

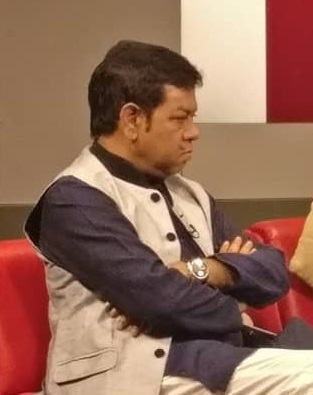
- Born: 1 August 1960 (age 66); Dhaka, Bangladesh
- Education: Dhaka University
- Occupations: Actor, Director
- Years active: 1984–present

Nader Chowdhury (born 1 August 1960) is a Bangladeshi actor and film director. He became widely popular for his role in the television drama Baro Rokom Manush. He started his acting career in theatre and has acted in many dramas and films. He has also directed three films.

== Early life ==
He was born on 1 August 1960 in Dhaka, Bangladesh.

== Career ==
Chowdhury began his acting career in 1984 with Dhaka Padatik Theatre. After seven years with the group, he joined the enlisted artists of Bangladesh Television (BTV) in 1991 through an audition. In the early stage of his career, he acted in small roles in several BTV dramas. In 1992, he gained recognition as a television actor for his role as a lodging master in the popular drama Baro Rokom Manush.

He has also worked as a director in Dhaka Padatik Theatre and has directed more than fifty stage plays over time. Since 2010, he has been writing dramas for television.

== Filmography ==
=== As actor ===
| Year | Title | Role | Director | Note |
|---|---|---|---|---|
| 1999 | Voyongkor Bishu | | Montazur Rahman Akbar | |
| 2005 | Meher Negar | | Moushumi and Mushfiqur Rahman Gulzar | |
| 2006 | Made in Bangladesh | ADC Kader | Mostofa Sarwar Farooki | |
| 2016 | Prem Ki Bujhini | | Sudipta Sarkar and Abdul Aziz | Bangladesh–India joint production |
| 2016 | Niyoti | Doctor | Zakir Hossain Raju | |
| 2017 | Doob | | Mostofa Sarwar Farooki | Bangladesh–India joint production |
| 2018 | Mone Rekho | Vice Chancellor | Wazed Ali Sumon | |
| 2018 | Poramon 2 | Talukdar | Raihan Rafi | |
| 2019 | Prem Amar 2 | | Bidula Bhattacharya | Bangladesh–India joint production |
| 2022 | Shaan | Asad Chowdhury | M Rahim | |
| 2022 | Joy Bangla | | Kazi Hayat | |
| 2023 | Radio | Tailor | Ananya Mamun | |
| 2023 | Shohore Onek Rod | Anik’s uncle | Mizanur Rahman Aryan | Released on Deepto TV |
| 2023 | Mike | | FM Shaheen and Hasan Zafrul Bipul | |
| 2024 | Rukhe Darao | | Sukumar Chandra Das | |
| Upcoming | Operation Jackpot | | Delwar Jahan Jhantu and Rajib Chowdhury | |

=== Television ===
| Year | Title | Role | Notes | Ref. |
|---|---|---|---|---|
| 2025–2026 | Eta Amaderi Golpo | Mohammad Gulzar Ahmed | TV serial on Channel i | |
| 2026 | Tomader Golpo 2 | | Released on Channel i | |

== As Director ==
| Year | Title | Credits | Artist | Note |
|---|---|---|---|---|
| 2005 | Lalchar | Director, screenplay and dialogue writer | Anisur Rahman Milon and Mohona Mim | |
| 2017 | Meyeti Ekhon Kothay Jabe | Director and screenplay writer | Shahriaz, Jolly, Fazlur Rahman Babu, Mamunur Rashid | The film won four awards at the 2016 National Film Awards |
| 2023 | Jinn | Director | Sajal Noor, Puja Cherry, Ziaul Roshan | |

=== Web series ===
| Year | Title | Role | Director | OTT | Note |
|---|---|---|---|---|---|
| 2022 | Sabrina | Moqbul | Ashfaque Nipun | Hoichoi | |
| 2022 | Kaiser | Al-Araf | Tanim Noor | Hoichoi | |

== Political career ==
Chowdhury is the Cultural Affairs Secretary of the Jatiya Samajtantrik Dal (JASAD). He contested in the 2015 Dhaka North City Corporation mayoral election.
