= Dilara Zaman =

Bangladeshi actress

- দিলারা জামান
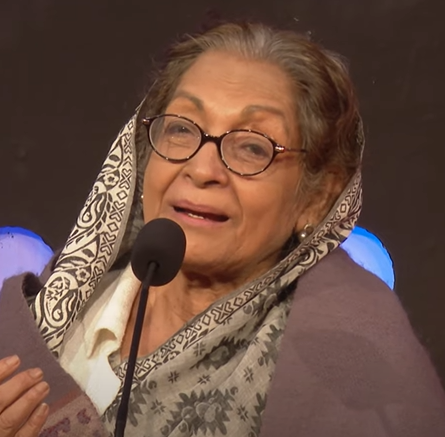
- Dilara in 2024
- Born: 19 June 1943 (age 83); Bardhaman District, Bengal Presidency, British India
- Education: University of Dhaka
- Occupation: Actor
- Spouses: Fakhruzzaman Chowdhury (m. 1966; died 2014)
- Relatives: Tazin Ahmed (niece)

Dilara Zaman (born 19 June 1943) is a Bangladeshi film and television actress. She was awarded the Ekushey Padak in 1993 and the Bangladesh National Film Award for Best Supporting Actress in 2008.

== Early life and education ==
Dilara Zaman was born on 19 June 1943 in Bardhaman District in British India to Rafiquddin Ahmed and Sitara Begum. Her family then moved to Asansol. After the partition of India in 1947, they finally moved to Jessore. She studied at Bangla Bazar Government Girls High School in Dhaka. She acted in her first stage play in this school. She went on to study at Eden College. She was under the mentorship of her guru, Natyaguru Professor Nurul Momen. She was a master's student of Bangla at the University of Dhaka.

== Personal life ==
Zaman eloped with and married Fakhruzzaman Chowdhury in 1966. They have two daughters, Tanira and Zubayra. Her niece was the actress Tazin Ahmed.

== Career ==
Zaman started acting in theatre in 1962. Her first play was Mayabi Prohor, scripted by Alauddin Al-Azad. In 1966, she acted in her first television drama, Tridhara, directed by Tahmina Banu. She was also a schoolteacher at BAF Shaheen College Dhaka and Viqarunnisa Noon School and College. She acted in numerous Bengali films and dramas over the course of 40 years. They include The Wheel and Chandragrohon. She became a school instructor in 1967 and stayed in the job until 1993.

== Works ==
Year	Films	Role	Notes	Ref.
1993	Chaka			
1994	Aguner Poroshmoni			
2004	Bachelor			
2007	Made in Bangladesh			
2008	Chandragrohon	Moyra Mashi		
2009	Priyotamesh			
2009	Monpura			
2014	Brihonnola	Tulsi's Mother		
2017	Haldaa			
2025	DayMukti	Momtaz		
2025	Jongli	Tithi's grandmother		
2025	Tomader Golpo	Dadi	Released on YouTube	
2026	Tomader Golpo 2		Released on Channel i	
2026	Shekor – The Roots			

=== Television ===
- Tridhara
- Sakal Sandhya
- Jaygir Master

== Awards ==
- Ekushey Padak
- Bangladesh National Film Award for Best Supporting Actress (2008)
