= Nuhash Humayun =

Bangladeshi film director

- নুহাশ হুমায়ূন
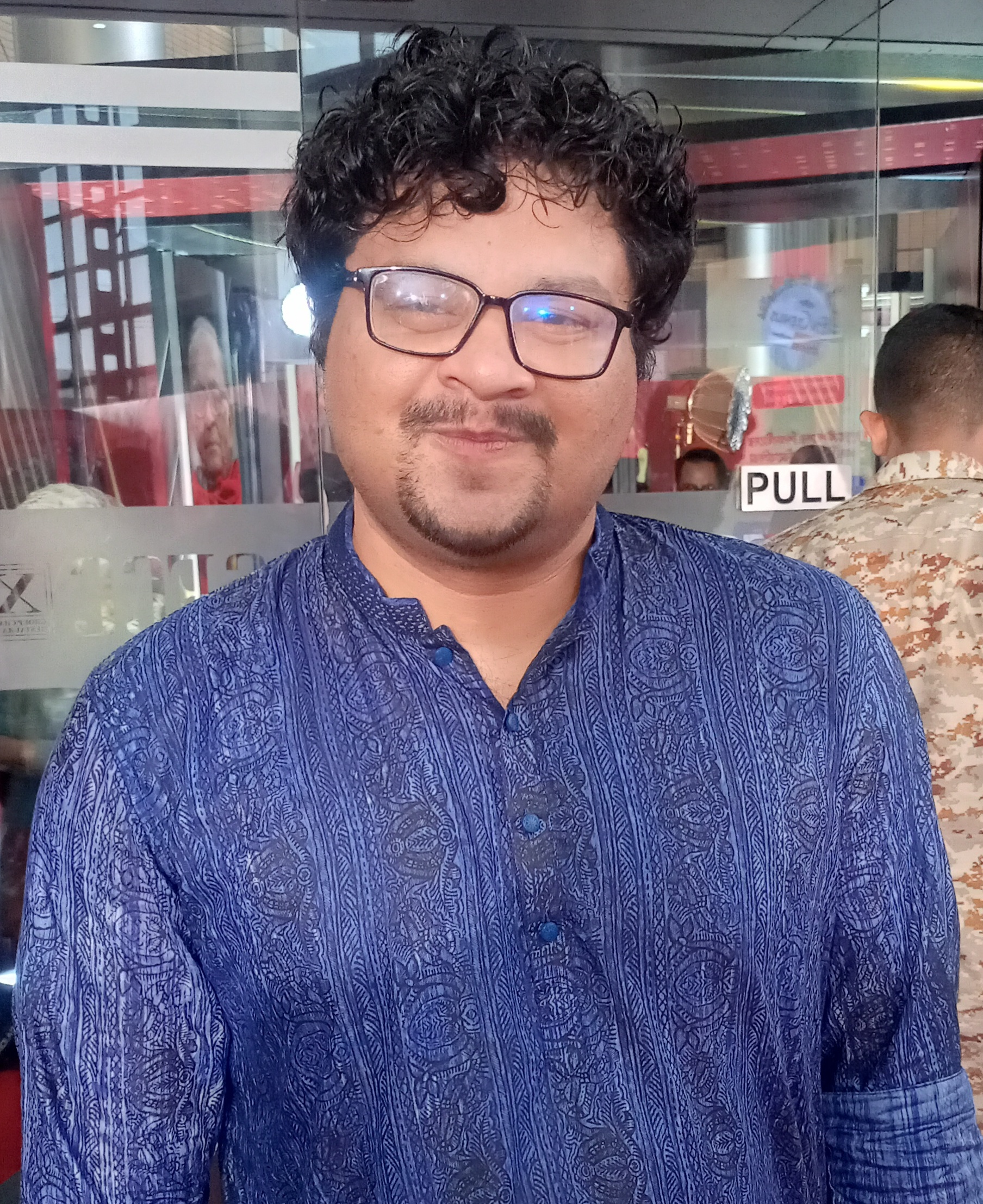
- Nuhash in 2025
- Born: January 1, 1992 (age 34)
- Education: Brac University
- Occupation: Film director
- Years active: 2017-present
- Notable work: Moshari, Pett Kata Shaw, Sincerely Yours, Dhaka
- Parent: Humayun Ahmed (father) Gultekin Khan (mother)
- Relatives: Mohammed Zafar Iqbal (paternal uncle); Ahsan Habib (paternal uncle); Shila Ahmed (elder sister); Faizur Rahman Ahmed (paternal grandfather)

Nuhash Humayun ( Bengali: নুহাশ হুমায়ুন; born 1 January 1992) is a Bangladeshi film director and screenwriter. His works include Moshari, Pett Kata Shaw, Sincerely Yours, Dhaka. His theatrical debut Sincerely Yours, Dhaka had its world premiere at the 2018 Busan International Film Festival and is currently on Netflix.

== Early life ==
Nuhash Humayun was born on January 1, 1992, in Dhaka, Bangladesh to Humayun Ahmed (1948-2012) and Gultekin Khan. His parents divorced when he was 11 years old. He stayed with his mother after the divorce. His father was a novelist, dramatist, and filmmaker. He is a graduate of BRAC University. He has three sisters named Nova, Shila, and Bipasha. He has 2 half-brothers, Nishad Humayun and Ninith Humayun. All 3 of his sisters raised him while his mother was a university student. He was 20 years old when his father passed away from cancer and he was present at his father's funeral.

== Career ==
Humayun's early works include short films like Paperfrogs, 700 Taka, and Pizza Bhai. He first came to the limelight after his film Sincerely Yours, Dhaka was selected for Bangladesh's entry for the 93rd Academy Awards. He acted and directed some TVC as well.

Humayun became famous for his web series Pett Kata Shaw. His direction and metaphors in the series were praised. This series was selected for the Harbor section in the 52nd edition of IFFR.

Humayun's short film Moshari won awards in many international festivals. Consequently, he was signed by Anonymous Content and Creative Artists Agency in 2022. Jordan Peele and Riz Ahmed became executive producers of the film. It is the first-ever Oscar qualifying film from Bangladesh.

After the success of Moshari, American over-the-top platform Hulu gave him the chance to direct an episode of their show Bite-Size Halloween. The episode is titled "Foreigners Only".

== Filmography ==
=== Web Series ===
Year	Title	Season	Genre	Platform	Note
2017	Osthir Somoy Shostir Golpo	1	Anthology	Bioscope	Segment: Hotel Albatross
2022	Pett Kata Shaw	1	Horror Anthology	Chorki	Web series
2022	Bite Size Halloween	3	Horror Anthology	Hulu	Segment: Foreigner's Only
2025	Dui Shaw	2	Horror Anthology	Chorki	sequel of Pett Kata Shaw

=== Films ===
Year	Title	Role	Genre	Note
2018	Sincerely Yours, Dhaka	Director	Anthology	Segment: The Background Artist
2026	Bonolota Express	Voice Artist	Comedy, Drama	As Dead Body, the Narrator and Son of Rashid Uddin
TBA	Moving Bangladesh †	Director	Drama	Feature film; Produced by Arifur Rahman; Filming

=== Short films ===
Year	Title	Genre	Note
2015	Dhaka Pocalypse	Comedy Horror	Writer
2017	Paperfrogs		
2017	Life In Other Words		Screenwriter
2018	Pizza Bhai	Comedy	Bioscope Original
2018	700 taka	Comedy	
2019	Lipstick	LGBTQ	
2019	Running Rafee		
2022	Moshari	Horror	

=== Dramas ===
Year	Title	Genre	Note
2020	Shesh Ta Shobai Jaane		
2023	Premer Natok		

=== Music Videos ===
Year	Title	Genre	Note
2019	Khoka		Director
2019	Golapi		Director

=== TV Series ===
Year	Title	Genre	Note
2020	For the Love of Food		
2020	Bichhuz		
