= Mohammad Mostafa Kamal Raz =

Bangladeshi television and film director, screenwriter and producer

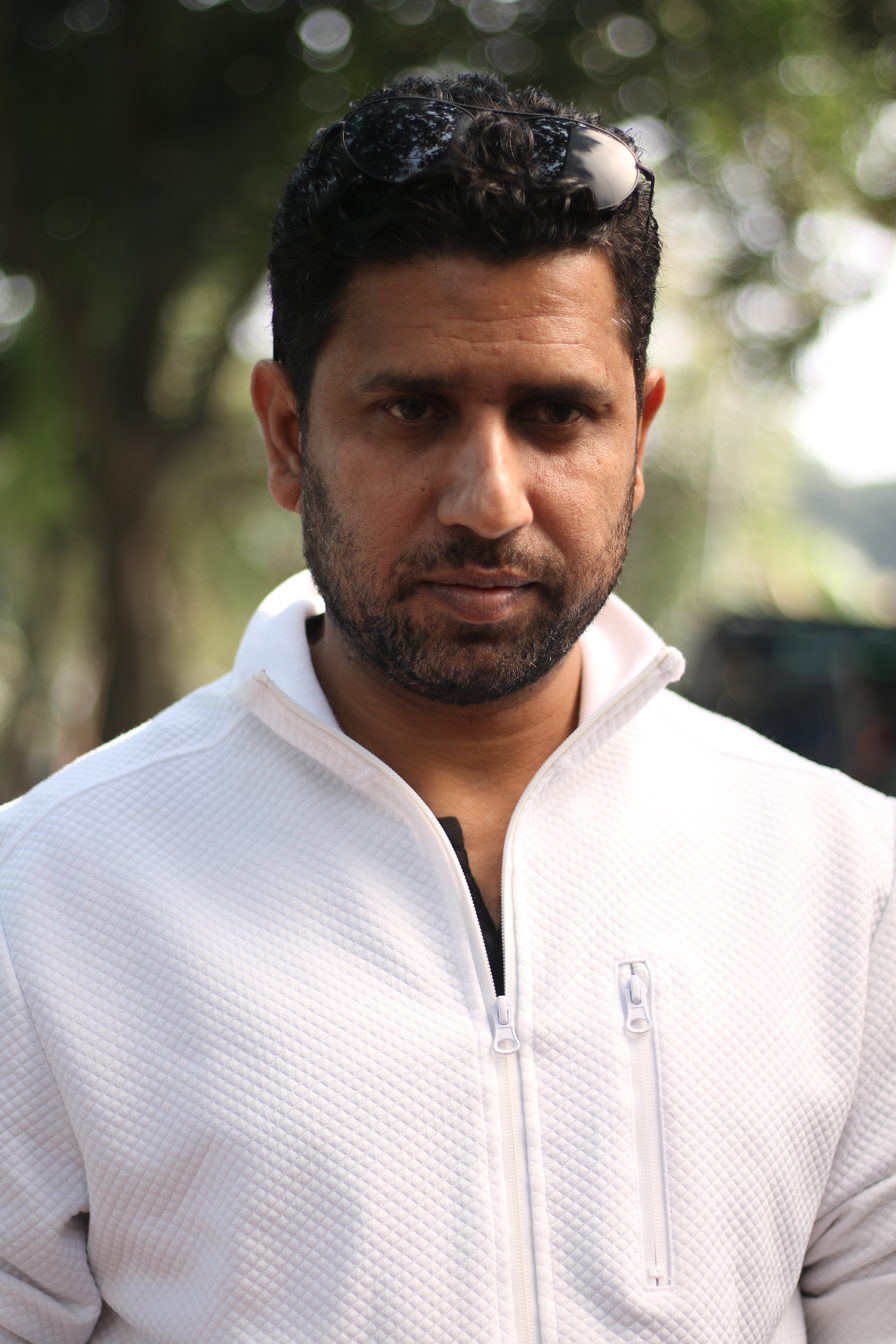
- Born: Mohammad Mostafa Kamal; 10 August 1981 (age 45); Raipura, Narsingdi, Dhaka, Bangladesh
- Education: Dhaka College
- Occupations: Film director; screenwriter; producer
- Years active: 2007–present
- Organization: CINEMAWALA

Mohammad Mostafa Kamal Raz (born 10 August 1981) is a Bangladeshi television and film director and screenwriter. He is best known for his directorial debut, Projapoti (2011), which was produced by Enayetur Rahman Bappy under the banner of NTV Production House. The film won three National Film Awards for Best Music Director, Best Lyricist & Best Singer (Female) and also best known for his other films Chaya Chobi (2012), Taarkata (2014) and Samraat (2016). He is also well known for being an assistant director under the film and TV director Mostofa Sarwar Farooki.

== Early life and education ==
Raz born on 10 August 1981 in Raipura Upazila of Narsingdi District. His father is Mohammad Sayed Ali and mother is Afia Khatun. He has seven sisters and brothers and he schooling at Gobindpur High School, Mymensingh Laboratory School and New Model High School. Then he completed graduate from Dhaka College.

== Career ==
He directed five movies in his film career, which was started by Projapoti (2011). After that, he did Chaya Chobi (2012), which is still unreleased. In 2014 he directed Taarkata Bangladesh got a huge response from young audiences in Bangladesh. Samraat: The King Is Here was another hit movie of his in 2016. He is now busy in post-production level of a romantic movie. He directed a brand new movie in 2019. Name of the movie Jodi Ekdin is starring Tahsan Khan, Srabanti Chatterjee and Taskeen Rahman in the leading role. He making the TV serial Family Crisis (2019–2021) which are received positive reception and widespread acclamation in the country.

== Filmography ==
Key
†	Denotes films that have not yet been released

Year	Films	Director	Screenplay	Story	Notes	Ref.
2011	Projapoti: The Mysterious Bird	Yes	Yes	No	Debut directed film	
2014	Taarkata	Yes	Yes	No		
2016	Samraat: The King Is Here	Yes	Yes	Yes		
2019	Jodi Ekdin	Yes	Yes	No		
2024	Omar	Yes	No	Yes		
TBA	Chaya Chobi †	Yes	Yes	No	Unreleased	

== Television ==
=== Selected television series ===
Year	Films	Director	Screenplay	Story	Notes	Ref.
2009	Mike	Yes	Yes		TV series on ATN Bangla	
2010–2011	Graduate	Yes	Yes		TV series on NTV	
2009–2010	Rong	Yes	Yes		Series	
2011	Chander Nijer Kono Alo Nei	Yes	Yes		Series	
2011–2012	Bachelors The Family	Yes	Yes		Series	
2012–2013	Idiots	Yes	Yes		Series	
2014–2015	Game	Yes	Yes		Series	
2016–2017	Dost Dushmon	Yes	Yes		Series	
2017	Post Graduate	Yes	Yes		TV series on NTV	
2018–2019	Off Screen	Yes	Yes		Series	
2019	Noy Choy	Yes	Yes		Series	
2019–2021	Family Crisis	Yes	Yes		Series	
2021–2022	Hit	Yes	Yes		Series	
2022–2023	Family Crisis Reloaded	Yes	Yes		Series	
2025–2026	Eta Amaderi Golpo	Yes	Yes		TV series on Channel i	
2026–Present	Dena Pawna	Yes	Yes		Series	

=== Selected television films ===
- Chirokumar Shongho
- Jogfol Shunno
- Den Mohor
- Flexi Load
- Van Gari
- Purno Dhorgo Bangla ChayaChobi
- Nechlace
- Noisho Bhoj
- Shada Golap
- Boroder Bibahoshastro
- Private Ricksha
- Bhagfol
- Bhagfol 2
- Bioghfol
- Matured
- Return
- Danamele
- Roopkotha
- Out of Focus
- The Mysterious Game
- Patro Chai
- SMS
- Bangkok
- Confidence
- Shondhan Din
- Shopne Dekha Rajkonna
- Kingkortobyobimur
- Didha
- Zero Zero Seven
- Offside
- Lal Kham Bonam Nil Kham
- Sadharon Bonam Osadharon
- 26 Din Matro
- Onuvube
- Fall in Love
- Cocktail
- Chokka
- Thai Bisesh Oggogon
- Goal
- Chele Manushi
- ChupiChupi
- Shey Amar Mon Kereche
- Wow
- Golpota amon hote parto
- Tinkonna
- Crutch
- Jua
- Trikonomiti
- Bhul
- Prompter
- Journey by bus
- TumiHina
- Golmaal
- Protisruti
- O My God
- Ami Tumi
- Zora Shalik
- Alamot
- Premeri Ronge Rangano
- Akti Paribarik Premkahini
- Kajol Rekhar Kurbani
- Shesher Golpo
- Kobitar moto golpo
- Chobir Manush
- Biye Birmombona
- Bibahito Bachelor
- Kokhno Kokhono
- Offside
- Order
- America
- Off the record
- Shishir-Bindu Part 1
- Shishir-Bindu Part 2
- I am Honest
- White Hacker
- PlayBoy
- Inayat
- Buk Vora Bhalobasha
- Buk Vora Bhalobasha 2
- Thank
- Unfit
- Crazy Lover
- Crazy lover 2
- Crazy for U
- Shada Rumal
- Magic of Love
- Say Sorry
- Shei To Ele Tumi
- I Hate Love Story
- Very Recently
- He She
- Tomar Amar Golpo
- Kajal
- Chirokumar Shongho 2
- Corruption
- 50 Lakh
- Mayay Theko
- Pita Mata Sontan
- Agomon
- Anurag
- Dhrubotara
- Anonna
- Bidisha
- Jeni
- Kokhono Megh Kokhono Brishty

== Awards and nominations ==
Year	Award	Category	Work	Result	Ref.
2026	Dhallywood Film and Music Awards	Best TV Director	Tomader Golpo	Won	
2026	Meril-Prothom Alo Awards	Best TV Director	Tomader Golpo	Won	
