= Dhallywood Film and Music Awards =

Bangladeshi award ceremony

- Current: 25th Dhallywood Film and Music Awards
- Awarded for: Excellence in cinematic achievements for Bangladeshi Films, and music
- Sponsored by: Time Music
- Location: Dhaka
- Country: Bangladesh
- First award: 2000
- Final award: 2014

The Dhallywood Film and Music Awards is organized by New York-based company Time Music. Every year this award is announced and the ceremony took place in USA.

== Award Categories ==
- Best Actor
- Best Actress
- Best Model (Male)
- Best Model (Female)
- Best Singer (Male)
- Best Singer (Female)
- Best Ramp Model
- Best Anchor
- Lifetime Achievement Award

== Award Ceremonies ==
Ceremony	Date	Host(s)	Venue	Notes	Source
1st Dhallywood Film and Music Awards	2002				
2nd Dhallywood Film and Music Awards	April 14, 2003		Manhattan Centre, New York, US	NTV aired the show	
3rd Dhallywood Film and Music Awards	2004				
4th Dhallywood Film and Music Awards	2005				
5th Dhallywood Film and Music Awards	2006				
6th Dhallywood Film and Music Awards	2007				
7th Dhallywood Film and Music Awards	2008				
8th Dhallywood Film and Music Awards	2009				
9th Dhallywood Film and Music Awards	2010				
10th Dhallywood Film and Music Awards	July 2 and 3, 2011		Washington DC, USA		
11th Dhallywood Film and Music Awards	June 17, 2012		Sound-view-NTV Auditorium, Film city Long Island, New York, US	Sponsored by Canada Purbachal City and aired Live on Cine Bangla and highlights on NTV and Bangla Vision USA	
12th Dhallywood Film and Music Awards	2013				
13th Dhallywood Film and Music Awards	April 21, 2014		Amarjura Concert Hall, New York, US		
14th Dhallywood Film and Music Awards	May 3, 2015				
22nd Dhallywood Film and Music Awards	June 11, 2023		Nabanna Party Hall, New York, US		
24th Dhallywood Film and Music Awards	January 18, 2025		Flushing Meadows Corona Park Queens Theatre, New York, US		
25th Dhallywood Film and Music Awards	10 January 2026				

== See also ==
- National Film Awards
- Meril Prothom Alo Awards
