= List of Bangladeshi films of 2026 =

This is a list of Bengali-language films produced in Dhallywood in Bangladesh that are released/scheduled to be released in the year 2026.

== Box office collection ==
The highest-grossing Dhallywood films released in 2026, by worldwide box office gross revenue, are as follows: The rank of the films in the following table depends on the estimate of worldwide collections.

Highest worldwide gross of 2026
No.	Title	Production company	Gross	Ref.
1	Bonolota Express	Buriganga Talkies & Hoichoi	৳25 crore (US$2.0 million)	
2	Prince: Once Upon a Time in Dhaka	Creative Land Films	৳6.7 crore (US$550,000)	
3	Domm: Until The Last Breath	SVF, Chorki & Alpha-i	৳6 crore (US$490,000)	
4	Rockstar	Sun Motion Pictures Limited	৳4.1 crore (US$330,000)	
5	Pressure Cooker	Impress Telefilm	৳3 crore (US$240,000)	
6	Rakkhosh	Real Energy Production	৳2.68 crore (US$220,000)	

== January – March ==
Opening		Title	Director	Cast	Production company	Ref.
J A N	16	Ekhane Rajnoitik Alaap Joruri	Ahmed Hasan Sunny	Imtiaz Barshon, Azad Abul Kalam, A. K. Azad Setu, Keya Al Jannah	Talking Trees Cinema	
J A N	30	Moynar Char	Mostafizur Rahman Babu	Mamnun Hasan Emon, Shusmi Rahman, Shiba Shanu	Bangladesh Government and Sami Banichitra	
F E B	13	Borisailla Pori	Salman Jasim	Shipan Mitra, Priya Sarkar	Munna Bhai Film Production	
M A R	21	Bonolota Express	Tanim Noor	Sabila Nur, Sariful Razz, Chanchal Chowdhury, Mosharraf Karim, Shyamol Mawla, Zakia Bari Mamo, Azmeri Haque Badhon, Intekhab Dinar	Buriganga Talkies, Dope Productions and Hoichoi Studios	
M A R	21	Prince: Once Upon a Time in Dhaka	Abu Hayat Mahmud	Shakib Khan, Jyotirmoyee Kundu, Tasnia Farin, Dibyendu Bhattacharya	Creative Land	
M A R	21	Domm: Until The Last Breath	Redoan Rony	Afran Nisho, Puja Cherry, Chanchal Chowdhury	SVF, Chorki and Alpha-i	
M A R	21	Rakkhosh	Mehedi Hasan Hridoy	Siam Ahmed, Susmita Chatterjee, Shataf Figar, Ali Raj, Samm Bhattacharya	Real Energy Production	
M A R	21	Pressure Cooker	Raihan Rafi	Shobnom Bubly, Nazifa Tushi, Maria Shanto, Misha Sawdagor	Impress Telefilm	

== April – June ==
Opening		Title	Director	Cast	Production company	Ref.
M A Y	1	Atarbibilane	Mejanur Rahman Labu	Farjana Sumi, Rashed Mamun Apu, Mostafa Prokash, Joy Raj	Times Media	
M A Y	1	Manushtike Dekho	Gazi Rakayet	Rashna Sharmin Camey, Tahmid Arefin Haque, Tariq Anam Khan	Centre for the Rehabilitation of the Paralyzed – CRP	
M A Y	8	Sardar Barir Khela	Rakhal Sabuj	Ziaul Roshan, Shobnom Bubly, Shahiduzzaman Selim, Azad Abul Kalam	Mrittika Chobighor	
M A Y	22	Contact Marriage	Hassan Jahangir	Hassan Jahangir, Moushumi, Jeba Jannat, Kazi Hayat	Ad Star	
M A Y	28	Rockstar	Azman Rusho	Shakib Khan, Sabila Nur, Tangia Zaman Methila	Sun Productions	
M A Y	28	Roid	Mezbaur Rahman Sumon	Mostafizur Noor Imran, Nazifa Tushi	Bongo	
M A Y	28	Bonolota Sen	Masud Hasan Ujjal	Khairul Basar, Masuma Rahman Nabila, Shohel Mondol	Red October Films	
M A Y	28	Malik	Saif Chandan	Arifin Shuvoo, Bidya Sinha Saha Mim	Divine Multimedia	
M A Y	28	Masud Rana	Saikat Nasir	Russell Rana, Puja Cherry, Syeda Tithi Omoni	Jaaz Multimedia & Impress Telefilm	
M A Y	28	Pinik	Jahid Juwel	Ador Azad, Shobnom Bubly, Keya Al Jannah	Euro Bangla Entertainment	
M A Y	28	Officer	Badiul Alam Khokon	D A Tayeb, Mahiya Mahi, Deepa Khandakar	SG Production	
M A Y	28	Tosnos	Badiul Alam Khokon	Munna Khan, Bobby Haque	Munna Khan Multimedia	
J U N	12	The University of Chankharpul	Akash Haque	Devodyuti Aich, Rocky Khan, Akhtaruzzaman Azad, Boby Biswas	Bee Team	

== July – September ==
Opening		Title	Director	Cast	Production company	Ref.
J U L	17	Mastul: Beyond The Mast	Mohammad Nuruzzaman	Fazlur Rahman Babu, Deepak Suman, Aminur Rahman Mukul, Arif Hasan	CineMaker	
J U L	17	Bapjan	A. R. Mukul Netrobadi	Sadia Mirza, Sohel, Shorol Hasmot	T.H Multimedia	
J U L	31	Shekor – The Roots	Proshoon Rahmaan	FS Nayeem, Aisha Khan, Dilara Zaman, Somu Chowdhury	Imation Creator	
A U G	7	Bou Niye Juddho	Mahfuzur Rahman Apon	Shadhin, Puspita, Jasmin, Kabila, Mizu Ahmed, Amit Hasan	Soccho Entertainment	
A U G	14	Bhalobashi Hoyni Bola	Abul Kashem Mondol	Sheikh Rifat, Nusrat Jahan Tanisha, Sadia Akter	Madhumita Chalachtra	
S E P	4	Love 96	Evan Mallik	Ariyan Khan, Purnota, Shiba Shanu, DJ Sohel	Raisa Films	
S E P	11	Bhalobashi Tomay	Abul Hossain Mojumdar	Kayes Arju, Shirin Shila, Nader Chowdhury, Borda Mithu	Mojumder Films	

== October – December ==
Opening		Title	Director	Cast	Production company	Ref.
O C T	2	Abar Hothat Brishti	Kamruzzaman	Arian Sarwar, Rafida Narmin, Kayes Arju, Mou Khan	Ashirbad Chalachitra & Impress Telefilm	
O C T	16	Sneher Bandhan	Kamruzzaman	Joy Chowdhury, Mou Khan, Sourav Farsi, Shiba Shanu, Kazi Hayat	Alam Multimedia	
O C T	16	Cut-Piece	Iffat Jahan Mom	Shifat Amin Shuvo, Rafah Nanjeba Torsa, Elina Shammi	Black Papers Films	
O C T	16	Chirkut	Muntashir Akib	Shamol Mawla, Azijun Mim, Quazi Nawshaba Ahmed	Film Mania	
O C T	23	Onno Pata	MD Shahajahan Any	MD Shariar Shakil, Mohammad Iftikhar Shayem, Prattasha Ghosh	SJA Production	
O C T	30	Pora Prem	Abul Kashem Mondol	Saikat Khan, Babita Islam, Kazi Hayat, Rina Khan	Janani Kothachitra	
O C T	13	Anondo Osru	Mostafizur Rahman Manik	Symon Sadik, Mahiya Mahi, Joy Chowdhury, Shahiduzzaman Selim	SS Productions	
O C T	20	Japito Jibon	Habibul Islam Habib	Afzal Hossain, Rokeya Prachy, Imtiaz Barshon, Iresh Zaker	Impress Telefilm & Jaaz Multimedia	
D E C						

== Upcoming ==
Film	Director	Cast	Production House	Refs
Soldier	Shakeeb Fahad	Shakib Khan	Sun Motion Picture Ltd.	
Andhar	Raihan Rafi	Siam Ahmed, Nazifa Tushi, Chanchal Chowdhury, Mostafa Monwar	221B Production	
Tribunal	Raihan Khan	Nusraat Faria, Ador Azad, Moushumi Hamid, Tania Brishty, Saira Akhter Jahan	Red Lime Studios	
Hangor	Tonmoy Surjo	Pramod Agrahari, Tahmina Othoi, Intekhab Dinar, Deepa Khandakar	Bigshot Creations	
Durbar	Kamrul Hassan Fuad	Shajal Noor, Apu Biswas	Kamrul Hassan Fuad Films	

== See also ==
- List of Bangladeshi films of 2025
