= Bidya Sinha Saha Mim =

Bangladeshi actress and model

- বিদ্যা সিনহা সাহা মিম
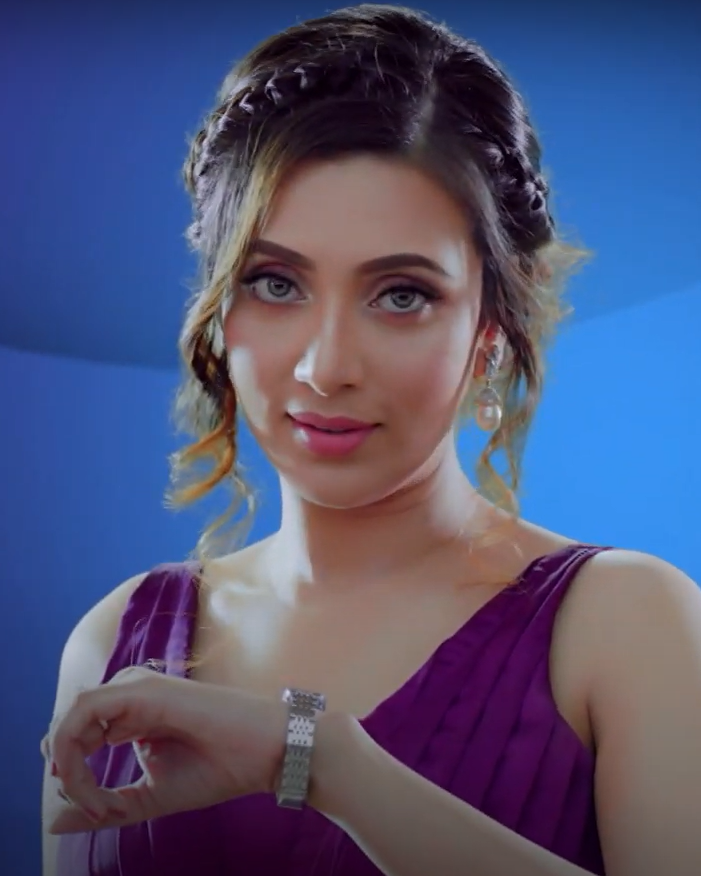
- Bidya Sinha in 2021
- Occupations: Actress, model, writer
- Years active: 2007–present
- Notable work: Amar Ache Jol, Podmo Patar Jol, Sultan: The Saviour
- Title: Lux Channel I Superstar 2007
- Spouse: Sony Poddar (m. 2022)
- Awards: See full list

Bidya Sinha Saha Mim is a Bangladeshi actress, model and Lux Channel I Superstar 2007. She made her film acting debut in Amar Ache Jol (2008) directed by Humayun Ahmed and produced by Impress Telefilm Limited.

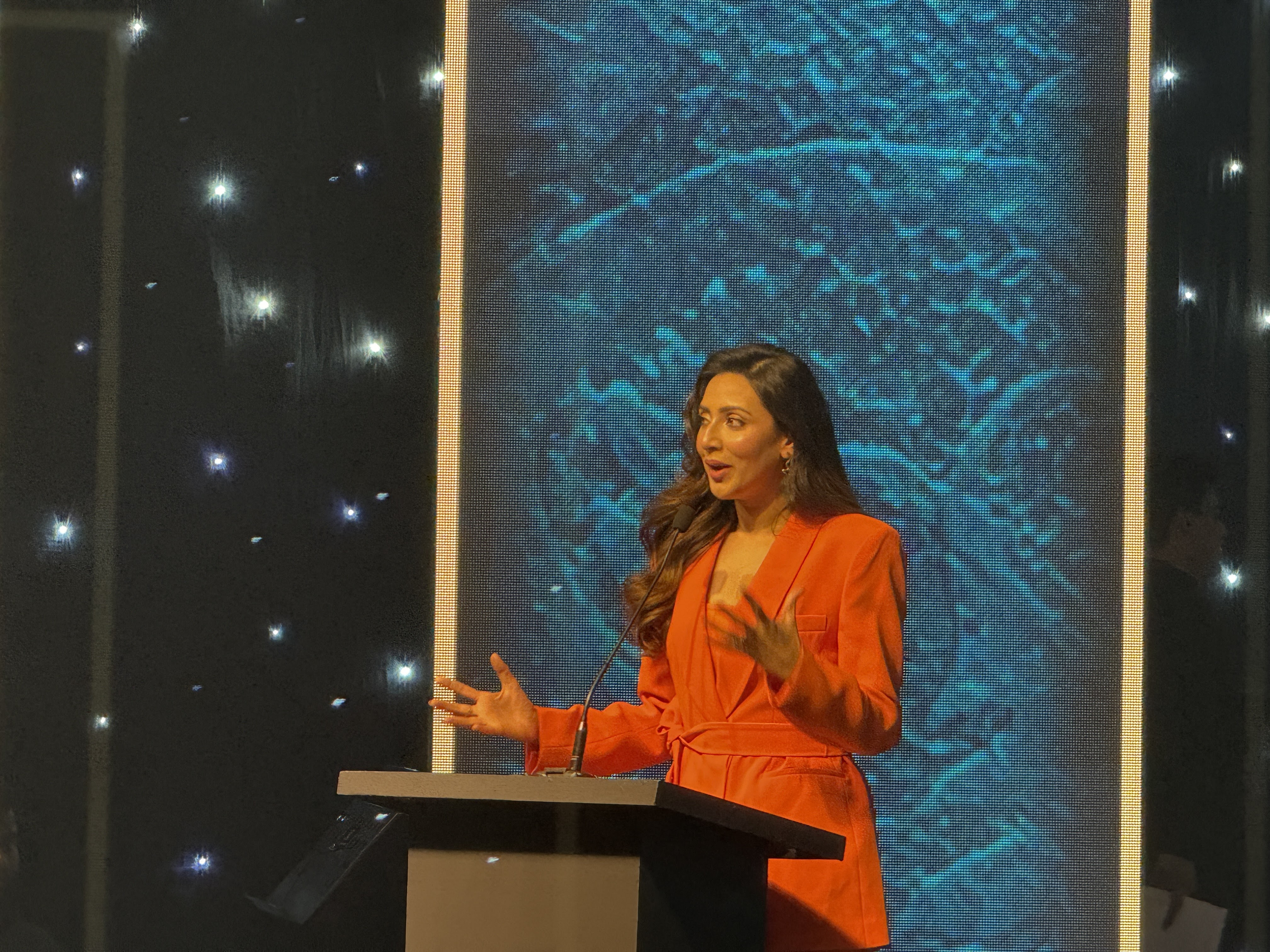
Bidya Sinha Saha Mim in 2026

== Personal life ==
Mim is a practicing Hindu. In 2022, she married Dhaka-based banker Sony Poddar in a traditional Hindu ceremony.

== Career ==
Mim won the 2007 beauty pageant Lux Channel I Superstar. Later, she worked in Tollywood with director Raja Chanda.

== Works ==
=== Filmography ===
Key
†	Denotes films that have not yet been released

Year	Film	Role	Notes	Ref.
2008	Amar Ache Jol	Dilshad	Debut film	
2009	Amar Praner Priya	Priyanka		
2014	Jonakir Alo	Kabita		
2014	Taarkata	Chad		
2015	Padma Patar Jol	Rupak		
2015	Black	Tina	Indian Bengali film	
2016	Sweetheart	Prilina Rosario		
2016	Ami Tomar Hote Chai			
2017	Valobasha Emoni Hoy	Oishee		
2017	Asmane Pakha Melo			
2017	Yeti Obhijaan	Chitrangada Verma	Indian Bengali film	
2017	Dulabhai Zindabad	Jamuna		
2018	Ami Neta Hobo	Sundori		
2018	Pashan			
2018	Sultan: The Saviour	Aliya	Indian Bengali film	
2019	Daag Hridoye			
2019	Thai Curry	Maya	Indian Bengali film	
2019	Shapludu	Pushpa		
2021	WTFry	Shama	Webfilm on ZEE5	
2022	Karnish	Tithi	Webfilm on Channel i	
2022	Poran	Ananya		
2022	Damal	Hasna		
2023	Antarjal	Nishat		
2023	Manush: Child of Destiny	ACP Mandira Sangal	Indian Bengali film; Special appearance	
2026	Malik	Mayaboti		
2026	Digante Phooler Agun †	Panna Kaiser	Post-production	

== Television ==
Year	Title	Co-Artist	Director	Notes
	Bou Shashuri Not Out	Shajal, Diti		
	Cholona Brishtite Viji	Shajal, Humayun Faridi, Tarana Halim, Hillol	Saiful Islam	
	Chondona	Shoaib	Rajib Rosul	
	Jodhaa Akbar	Apurba, Mostofa	Dayel Rahman	
	Jhorer Raat Fuler Din			
	Jadur Katthi			
	Love Consultant	Hasan Masood		
	Poush Faguner Pala			
	Patro Chai Na	Shajal, Bindu, Nadia Ahmed, Sarika, Nawsheen		
	A B C		Sheikh Salem	
	Seat Khali Nai	Mahfuz Ahmed, Mir Sabbir, Litu Anam	Ferdous Hasan	
	Bhabona Gulo Onno Rokhom			
	Bhalo Thakar Sohoj Upay	FS Nayeem		
	Bicycle			
	Drishsho Odrishshor Sporsho	Chanchal Chowdhury		
	Man Power			TV Serial
	Moner Aka Chchobi	Shajal, Abdul Kader		
	Meghe Meghe	Shajal		
	Shoyleer Biye	Shyamol		
	Shesher Golpo	Shajal		
	Soikote Manoshi	Shahed Sharif Khan, Shahid Alamgir, Nupur A & I	Nazrul Quraishi	
	Anmone Ogochore	Shahed, Shahid Khan, Shahid Alamgir, Sharmili Ahmed	Nazrul Quraishi	
	Ferrari Ekdin	Shajal		
	Emni B S	Abul Kalam		
	Ekti Chithi	Shajal		
	Ekjon Rikshawala	Mosharraf Karim		
	Nil Jochonay Kalo Shap		Mohon Khan	
	Putul Putul Khela	FS Nayeem		
	Prem Bikriya	Shajal		
	Roddurer Aakhankai			
	Tini Bujhte Parlen Je Eta Prem Noy		Alom Ashraf	
	Rohoshyo	Riaz	Humayun Ahmed	
	Shesher Kobitar Porer Kobita	Nobel, Arifin Shuvoo	Mahfuz Ahmed	
	Bhalobashi Tai	Shajal, Hillol, Arifin Shuvoo, Bindu, Tisha	Shihab Shaheen	
	Pori Kimba Babar Golpo	Shajal	Naresh Bhuiyan	
	Will You Marry Me	Arifin Shuvoo	Pantho Sarkar	
	Over Confidence	Arifin Shuvoo	F.Q.Petar	
	Bhalobasar Ghran (Smell of Sensation/Love)	Shajal, Joli	Himel Ashraf	
	Ei Chele	Shajal, Nirob	Mizanur Rahman Aryan	
	Love Bank	Mosharraf Karim	Moshiur Rahman	
	Nil Chhoya	Shahriar Nazim Joy	Falguni Ahmed	
	Faltu Chairman	Mir Sabbir	Uttom Guho	
	Antrik Bhalobasha	Arifin Shuvoo	Pallab Bishash	
	Mon Nondini	Shajal		
	Bhalobashar Kodom Phul	Shajal		
	Biborno Bhalobasha	Intekhab Dinar, Arifin Shuvoo	S.M Shaheen	
	Shopnogulo Tai Oshomapurno	Shajal	Mizanur Rahman Aryan	
	Dorpohoron	Niloy		Based on Rabindranath Tagore short story
	Kick off	Partha Barua, Afnan		
	Ek Hazar Taka	Afran Nisho	Juboraz Khan	
	Muloto Natoker Shuru Ekhan Theke	Anisur Rahman Milon		
	Trump Card	Afran Nisho, Shatabdi Wadud	Mizanur Rahman Aryan	
	Trump Card-II	Tuhin, Robi	Mizanur Rahman Aryan	
	Megh Bristi Otohpor	FS Nayeem	Mizanur Rahman Aryan	
	Oporichita	Mir Sabbir		Based on Rabindranath Tagore short story
	Sob Badha Periye	Shahed Sharif Khan	Rashed Raha	
	Odvut Ek Purnima Rater Golpo	Anisur Rahman Milon		
	Sombodhon Tin Prokar	Afran Nisho, FS Nayeem	Mizanur Rahman Aryan	
	Kobir Jonno Patri Khoja Hocche	Iresh Zaker		
	Bola Na Bolar Golpo	Afran Nisho	Selim Reza	
	Bou Chor	Mosharraf Karim	Shamim Zaman	
	Devdas Hote Chai	Afran Nisho		
	Antivirus	Tahmid		
	Spook	Anisur Rahman Milon	Taneem Rahman Angshu	
	Anamika	Shoaib		
	Harano Sur	Mosharraf Karim		
	The Vaccine	Shajal		
	Jhapsha Manush	Shajal		
	Binodini Kinba Kobi	Anisur Rahman Milon		
	Kobita Na Bhalobasha	Chanchal Chowdhury		
	November Rain	Shajal		
	Uddessho	Tahsan	Mabrur Rashid Bannah	TV Serial
	Old is Gold	Tahsan	Imraul Rafat	
	Prem Pagol	Mosharraf Karim		
	Ami Citrangoda	Shajal		
	Shoirachar	Afran Nisho		
	Golpoti Tomar Amar	Shajal	Mizanur Rahman Aryan	
	Nari Sundori	Rownak Hasan	Mahmud Didar	
	Bhalobashar Bhubone	Shahed Sharif Khan		
	Chilli Chocolate	Iresh Zaker		
	Khyati (Khati)	Anisur Rahman Milon		
	Raza Badshar Karbar			Special Appearance
	Kobi Ebong Corporate Bhalobasha	Anisur Rahman Milon		
	Tumar Pichu Pichu	Tahsan	Mabrur Rashid Bannah	Valentine's Special Drama
	Shei Meyeta	Tahsan	Mizanur Rahman Aryan	
	Station Master	Shajal		
	I Got A Job	Maznun Mizan		
	Bibaho	Shadhin Khosru, Dr.Ezazul Islam, Faruque Ahmed		
	Ebong Ekti Chithi	Shajal		
	Bhalobashar Bhoot	Shajal		
	Shesh Prohor	Shajal, Shiuly		
	Mokbul Enterprise	Chanchal Chowdhury, Faruque Ahmed		
	Mohamaya	Omor Ayaz Oni		Based on Rabindranath Tagore short story
	Feedback	Shajal		
	Bhalobasha Kake Bole	Afran Nisho		
	Shei Shomoy Tumi Ami	Tahsan	Mabrur Rashid Bannah	
	Achor	Niloy		
	Duti Mon Ekti Valobasha	Rawnak Hasan		
	Valobashar Epith Opith	Azizul Hakim, Anisur Rahman Milon		
	Onno Chokhe Bhalobasha	Arifin Shuvoo		
	Protiddhoni	Shajal	Badruzzaman Shuvo	
	Paying Guest	Shajal		
	Last Moment	Shajal	B U Shuvo	
	Shei Tumi Ele	Amin Khan		
	Shopno Mashul	Mir Sabbir		
	Charu Ebong Onnanno	Azizul Hakim, Anisur Rahman Milon		
	Hotat Biye	Tahsan Rahman Khan	Osman Miraz	
	Hello Baby	Tahsan Rahman Khan	Kajal Arefin Ome	
	Obosheshe	Tahsan Rahman Khan	Mahmudur Rahman Hime	
	Other Half	Tahsan Rahman Khan	Mabrur Rashid Bannah	
	Kidnap Me, Please	Tahsan Rahman Khan	Farhad Ahmed	
	Risky Love	Farhan Ahmed Jovan	Osman Miraz	
	Chehara	Manoj Pramanik	Jamal Mallick	
	Moner Manush	Mosharraf Karim	Sanjoy Somadder	

=== Web series ===
Year	Title	OTT	Character	Co-Artist	Director	Notes
2019	Beauty and the Bullet	Bioscope	Rekha	Afran Nisho, Tahsan, Emon, Momo, Mim Mantasha, Badhan Lincoln, Suborna Mustafa, Tariq Anam Khan	Animesh Aich	
2019	Neel Dorja	Bioscope	Tabassum	Chanchal Chowdhury, ABM Sumon	Golam Sohrab Dodul	
2023	Mission Huntdown	Hoichoi	Nira	FS Nayeem, Sumit Sengupta	Sunny Sanwar, Faisal Ahmed	

=== Short films ===
Year	Title	Role	Co-Artist	Director	Notes
2020	Connection		Tahsan Rahman Khan	Raihan Rafi	
2021	Not Her Fault			Mahathir Spondon	

== Awards and nominations ==
- Lux Channel i Superstar 2007 winner

Year	Award	Category	Film	Result
2008	Meril Prothom Alo Awards-Critics	Best Actress	Amar Ache Jol	Won
2009	Meril Prothom Alo Awards	Best Actress	Amar Praner Priya	Nominated
2011	Meril Prothom Alo Awards	Best TV Actress	Olospur	Nominated
2012	Meril Prothom Alo Awards	Best TV Actress	Kick Off	Nominated
2014	Bangladesh National Film Awards	Best Actress	Jonakir Alo	Won
2014	Meril Prothom Alo Awards	Best Actress	Taarkata	Nominated
2014	Meril Prothom Alo Awards	Best TV Actress	November Rain	Nominated
2023	BFDA Awards	Best Film Actress	Poran	Won

== Bibliography ==
- Shraboner Brishti Te Bheja (2012)
- Purnota (2013)
- Ampatar Bashi (2027)
