= Rawnak Hasan =

Bangladeshi actor and director

M M Kamrul Hasan Rawnak
- এম এম কামরুল হাসান রওনক
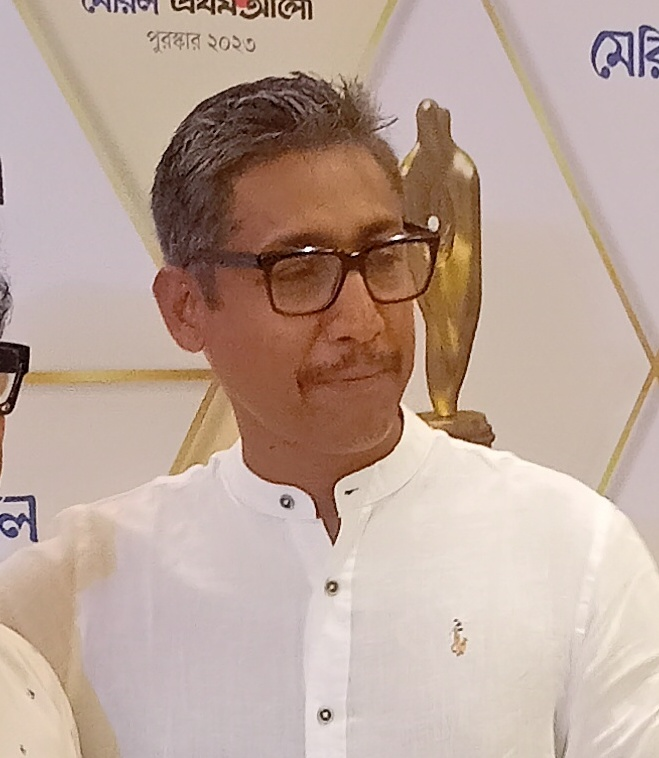
- Other names: Rawnak Hasan
- Education: Chittagong Cantonment Public College
- Occupations: Actor, writer, director and producer
- Spouse: Nk Bidhu
- Children: 1

Rawnak Hasan is a Bangladeshi actor, director and playwright. He won the Meril Prothom Alo Best Actor Critic Award for the telefilm Ratargul (2014) He is the general secretary of the Actors Equity.

== Career ==
At the age of eighteen, Rawnak joined a theatre group called Theatre Art Nattayadol in the year of 1995. This was the beginning of his acting career when he realized that real acting is performed in theatres. He debuted in a play called Prohelika but his character had no dialogue. He performed in a number of plays like ‘Court Marshal’, Kallattar, Hingtingchot, and Kaataa as a member of theatre Art Nattayadol till 1999.

Later on, he joined another theatre group called ‘Nattayajon’ where he worked for few months. In the same year, he joined the theatre group Nagarik Nattaya Shampraday.

Hasan made his first television appearance in a drama serial called Kagojer Phool. In 2004, his first written screenplay for a drama serial Boyosh Jokhon Ekush, was premiered. He debuted as a director in 2004 by directing a television drama called Tomatei.

On 28 January 2022, Hasan became the general secretary of the Actors Equity for 2022–25 term after receiving 421 votes.

== Works ==
Scriptwriter

- Ekusher por
- Choukidar
- Kotha Chilo Onnorokom
- Tithi Abong
- Sob Kichu Venge Pore
- Ayeje Bhai Shunchen
- Dhulo Ora Din
- Chile Kothar Shopno
- Rochi Momo Falguni
- Bajii
- Jal
- Shada Kalo
- Ami Tumi Tumi Ami
- Contrast

Theatre actor

- Dewan Gajir Kissa,
- Coppernicus er Captian
- Chhayanaut
- Nattayatroyi
- Ocholayton
- Nurul Diner Shara Jibon
- Roktokorobi

Television actor

- Ghor Sawarer Shopno (2005)
- Ghure Daranor Shopno
- Kacher Manush
- Megh Boleche Jabo Jabo
- Labonno Probha
- Eir Kather Kacha
- Aim in Life
- Late Latif
- Tula Rashi
- 73 Number
- Nil Nirjone
- Mamuli Ekta Manush
- Chaita Pagol
- Joyeeta
- Amader Choto Nodi
- Amader Golpo
- Sakin Sarisuri
- Kobuliotnama
- Otithi
- School of Politics
- Ratan
- Hoimonti
- Shubho Drishti
- Robibar
- Rochi Momo Falguni
- Vasha Andoloner Prothom Shogrami
- Chaya Brikkher Rajkonna
- Ratragul
- Gogon Aaj Deshe Firbe
- Oshonglogno, Chor O Churi
- Kumar Nil Angti
- Bibaho Bibhrat * Bizli
- Bhasha Andoloner Prothom Shonglaap,
- Naoshal
- Bibaho Hobe

=== Web series ===
Year	Title	OTT	Character	Co-Artist	Director	Writer	Notes
2019	Feluda Nayan Rahasya	Bioscope		Ahmed Rubel, Azad Abul Kalam, Abul Hayat, Tauquir Ahmed	Tauquir Ahmed		
2021	Contract	ZEE5		Chanchal Chowdhury, Arifin Shuvoo, Mithila, Momo, Iresh Zaker, Aisha Khan Tahiya, Shamol Mawla, Maznun Mizan, Tariq Anam Khan, Jayanta Chattopadhyay, Mahmud Sazzad, Somu Chowdhury	Tanim Noor and Krishnendu Chattopadhyay		a ZEE5 web series
2021	Bou Diaries (Bon Appetit)	Bioscope		Nazia Haque Orsha	Sameer Ahmed		
2022	Bodh	Hoichoi			Amitabh Reza Chowdhury		

=== Television Serial ===
Year	Title	Television Channel	Co-Artist	Director	Writer
2015	Pagoler Mela	On Aired ON TV	Nadia Ahmed	Ajharul Alam	Rajib Moni Das
