= Contract (TV series) =

Bangladeshi streaming television series

- Poster
- Genre: Political; Action; Thriller
- Created by: Sarder Saniat Hossain; Tanim Noor; Krishnendu Chattopadhyay
- Based on: Contract by Mohammad Nazim Uddin
- Screenplay by: Ayman Asib Shadhin; Tanim Noor; Krishnendu Chattopadhyay; Sarder Saniat Hossain
- Story by: Mohammad Nazim Uddin
- Directed by: Tanim Noor; Krishnendu Chattopadhyay
- Music by: Rasheed Sharif Shoaib
- Country of origin: Bangladesh
- Original language: Bengali
- No. of seasons: 1
- No. of episodes: 6

Production
- Executive producers: Rumel Chowdhury; Zakia Rashid Meem
- Producers: Iresh Zaker; Sarder Saniat Hossain
- Cinematography: Ishtiaque Hossain
- Editor: Sameer Ahmed
- Running time: 25–36 minutes

Original release
- Network: ZEE5
- Release: 18 March 2021

Contract (Bengali: কন্ট্রাক্ট) is a Bangladeshi streaming television political-action thriller series directed by Tanim Noor and Krishnendu Chattopadhyay. It is based on the novel series Beg-Bastard (Contract) written by Mohammad Nazim Uddin. The series consisting of six episodes premiered on 18 March 2021 on ZEE5. The series features an ensemble cast consisting of Chanchal Chowdhury, Arifin Shuvoo, Zakia Bari Mamo, Rafiath Rashid Mithila, Shamol Mawla, Aisha Khan, Rawnak Hasan, Tariq Anam Khan and Jayanta Chattopadhyay.

== Premise ==
A contract killer known as Bastard and homicide investigator Jeffery Beg. Notorious crime lord Black Ronju becomes a key piece in their saga.

— The Business Standard

== Cast ==
- Chanchal Chowdhury as Black Ranju
- Arifin Shuvoo as Tareque/Bastard
- Shamol Mawla as Jeffrey Beg
- Aisha Khan as Uma
