= Kaiser (TV series) =

2022 Bangladeshi television series

- Poster
- Genre: Drama thriller
- Created by: Tanim Noor
- Written by: Abdul Kaiyum Leon, Ayman Asib Swadhin and Tanim Noor
- Screenplay by: Ayman Asib Shadhin
- Story by: Ayman Asib Shadhin
- Directed by: Tanim Noor
- Composer: Rasheed Sharif Shoaib
- Country of origin: Bangladesh
- Original language: Bengali
- No. of seasons: 1
- No. of episodes: 8

Production
- Executive producer: Krishnendu Chattopadhyay
- Producers: Rumel Chowdhury; Mir Mukarram Hossain
- Cinematography: Abdul Mamun
- Editor: Saleh Sobhan Auneem
- Production company: Film Syndicate

Original release
- Network: Hoichoi
- Release: 8 July 2022

Kaiser is a 2022 Bangladeshi detective thriller web series directed by Tanim Noor. The series is jointly written by Abdul Kaiyum Leon, Ayman Asib Swadhin and Tanim Noor. It stars Afran Nisho in the title role, along with Mostafizur Noor Imran, Reekita Nondine Shimu, Shatabdi Wadud, Imtiaz Barshon, and Suman Anwar in supporting roles.

The first season, consisting of 9 episodes, was released on 8 July 2022 on the streaming platform Hoichoi. It is considered as one of the finest web series in Bangladesh.

== Cast ==
- Afran Nisho as ADC Kaiser Chowdhury
- Mostafizur Noor Imran as Amlan
- Reekita Nondine Shimu as Shirin
- Shatabdi Wadud as Bachchu
- Imtiaz Barshon as Barrister Mokhtar Mahmud Zaffery
- Suman Anwar as Dr. Abed
- Shankha Zaman as Tanmoy
- Monirul Islam Rubel as Majid
- Deepanwita Martin as Munira
- Shoumya Joyti as Anonto
- Mugdhota Morshed Riddhi as Nikita
- Ahmed Hasan Sunny as Niloy
- Tahia Tazin Khan Aisha as Saba
- Tamanna Haque Barna as Jaya
- Naziba Bashar as Dr. Tania
- Nader Chowdhury as Al-Araf
- Shahed Ali as Abdalur
- Shaheen Mostafiz as Johnny
- Zinat Sanu Swagata as Kobori Jannat
- Sangeeta Chowdhury as Mithila
- Nafis Ahmed as Russo
- Mahfuz Munna as Mondol
- Ahmed Rubel as Chief
- Ashok Bepari as Bachchu’s lawyer

== Reception ==
=== Critical response ===
Sadia Khalid Reeti of Dhaka Tribune, commended Kaiser as a standout Bangladeshi detective series, praising Afran Nisho's performance, Tanim Noor's direction, and the show's blend of social commentary with emotional depth.

Shamayita Chakraborty of OTTPlay, rated the series 4 out of 5 stars, describing it as "riveting and smart." She praised Afran Nisho's performance as the temperamental protagonist and lauded the series' complex murder mystery plot and intricate character dynamics.

Samarah Jannati Zamal of The Business Standard, praised Kaiser as a standout Bangladeshi detective series, highlighting Afran Nisho's performance, Tanim Noor's direction, strong supporting cast, and an unpredictable plot that maintains high standards throughout.

Iftekharul Islam of The Financial Express, reviewed the web series Kaiser was commended for elevating Bengali crime drama, praising its engaging narrative, strong direction and Afran Nisho's compelling portrayal of a complex detective.

== Awards and nomination ==
Blender's Choice-The Daily Star OTT and Digital Content Awards

Date	Department	Nomination	Result	Source
21 October 2023	Best Drama/Series	Kaiser	Nominated	
21 October 2023	Best Director (Series)	Tanim Noor	Nominated	
21 October 2023	Best Actor (Male)	Afran Nisho	Nominated	
21 October 2023	Best Supporting Actor	Mostafizur Noor Imran	Nominated	
21 October 2023	Best Actor (Negative Role)	Imtiaz Barshon	Nominated	
21 October 2023	Best Script Writer	Ayman Asib Shadhin	Nominated	
21 October 2023	Best Background Score	Rasheed Sharif Shoaib	Nominated	
