= Kaalpurush (TV series) =

2024 Bangladeshi streaming television series

- Genre: Science fiction; Mystery; Drama
- Written by: Salzar Rahman
- Directed by: Salzar Rahman
- Starring: See below
- Music by: Avishek Bhattacharjee
- Country of origin: Bangladesh
- Original language: Bengali
- No. of seasons: 1
- No. of episodes: 7

Production
- Executive producers: Mir Mokarram Hossain; Syed Ahmed Shawki; Tanim Noor; Krishnendu Chattopadhyay; Rumel Chowdhury; Rehman Sobhan Sonet
- Producers: Saleh Sobhan Auneem; Redoan Rony
- Production location: Bangladesh
- Cinematography: Barkat Hossain Polash
- Editors: Saleh Sobhan Auneem; Syed Mehboob Hussain
- Running time: 20–34 minutes
- Production company: Film Syndicate

Original release
- Network: Chorki
- Release: May 23, 2024

Kaalpurush (Bengali: কালপুরুষ) is a Bangladeshi streaming television science fiction mystery drama series, written and directed by Salzar Rahman (in his debut). The series consisting of seven episodes premiered on 23 May 2024 on Chorki. Chanchal Chowdhury and FS Nayeem in the lead roles and, Tanzika Amin, Imtiaz Barshon, Priyontee Urbee, Jayanta Chattopadhyay, Sushoma Sarkar, Mostafa Monwar and Rezwan Parvez in the main supporting roles. The story revolves around the mysterious murder of a woman named Faria at Dhanmondi Lake. Detective SI Miraj becomes obsessed with the case, uncovering a twisted reality involving time travel, a sinister serum, and past crimes.

== Premise ==
Detective Miraj (played by FS Nayeem) unravels a twisted murder case, intertwining with an old one, revealing a surreal truth that challenges his sanity.

— Chorki

== Cast ==
- Chanchal Chowdhury as Shehzad Chowdhury
- FS Nayeem as SI Miraj Ur Rahman
- Tanzika Amin as Nova
- Imtiaz Barshon as SI Jahangir
- Priyontee Urbee as Faria Rani Bain
- Jayanta Chattopadhyay as Shamsul Alam
- Sushoma Sarkar as Dr. Asma
- Mostafa Monwar as Helal
- Rezwan Parvez as Shafiq Hossain
- Jannatul Mawya Lajuk

== Production ==
The conceptualization of Kaalpurush began long before its production, originating from a real-life experience of the series' writer and director, Salzar Rahman. During a visit to a pharmacy in Old Dhaka, Rahman conceived the foundational idea for the narrative. He utilized the lockdown period of the COVID-19 pandemic to pen the script, shaping it into a distinct psychological murder mystery where time itself acts as the primary protagonist. The series also marks Salzar Rahman's directorial debut in the "Over-The-Top" (OTT) landscape, having previously directed commercials and music videos.

The project gained substantial momentum after being picked up by the prominent Bangladeshi production house, Film Syndicate. Founders Mir Mokarram Hossain and Syed Ahmed Shawki expressed immense confidence in Rahman's vision. Despite Rahman being a newcomer to narrative filmmaking, Shawki noted that the unique concept possessed a "spark" (referred to as barud), which immediately led the production house to plan Kaalpurush as a potential franchise. This project marked the end of a nearly two-year hiatus for Film Syndicate, during which they focused on story development and capacity building.

In early 2024, the streaming platform Chorki announced a major collaboration with Film Syndicate, commissioning 10 web series to be produced over the subsequent three years. Kaalpurush was selected as the inaugural project under this multi-year deal, continuing a partnership that dates back to Chorki's inception with the anthology series Unoloukik.

The technical and creative crew behind the series played a critical role in establishing its unique atmospheric tone. The project was produced by Saleh Sobhan Auneem under the Film Syndicate banner, with Redoan Rony serving as the producer from Chorki. Syed Ahmed Shawki served as the executive producer. The series' Art direction was handled by Shihab Nurun Nabi. The series' cinematography was captured by Barkat Hossain Polash and, edited by Saleh Sobhan Auneem and Syed Mehboob Hussain, while color grading handled by them and Nawshin Sarwar. The distinctive visual appearance and wardrobe of the characters were crafted by costume designer Edila Farid Turin, while Rubama Fairuzz served as the makeup artist.

The auditory identity of Kaalpurush featured significant contributions to its soundtrack, highlighted by the OTT playback singing debut of prominent vocalist Elita Karim, who performed the song "Mohakaal". The soundtrack also included tracks like "Bebak Bebagi" by Shayan Chowdhury Arnob and "Amar Nuton Ami" by The Watson Brothers. The original background score and music direction for the series were composed by Avishek Bhattacharjee, while sound designed by Adeep Singh Manki.

== Marketing and Release ==
=== Marketing ===
On May 2, 2024, Chorki officially unveiled the first-look poster of the series on social media. The poster featured the primary star cast—comprising Chanchal Chowdhury, FS Nayeem, and Tanzika Amin—set against a gritty, blood-splattered backdrop hinting at the show's dark theme.

=== Release ===
Kaalpurush was released on May 23, 2024, on the OTT platform Chorki.
