= Shatabdi Wadud =

Bangladeshi actor

- Occupation: Actor
- Years active: 1992–present

Shatabdi Wadud is a Bangladeshi film and television actor. He won Bangladesh National Film Award in Best Actor in a Negative Role for his role in the film Guerrilla (2011).

== Career ==
In 1985 Wadud joined a drama club Artonad. He joined theatre troupe Theatre Centre in 1991 and Prachyanat in 1997. His debut performance in television was in Shonkito Podojatra.

== Works ==
=== Films ===
Year	Title	Role	Director	Notes
2008	Phulkumar	Shafi	Ashique Mostafa	
2008	Rupantor		Abu Sayeed	
2011	Phirey Esho Behula		Tanim Noor	
2011	Meherjaan	Khalil	Rubaiyat Hossain	
2011	Guerrilla	Captain Shamsad / Major Sarfaraz	Nasiruddin Yousuff	National Film Awards for 10 categories
2013	Ayna Kahini	Mizan	Razzak	
2014	Jibondhuli		Tanvir Mokammel	Received Script Award from Hubert Bals Fund, Rotterdam Film Festival
2015	Bapjaner Bio-scope	Hasen Molla	Reazul Mawla Rezu	World premiere on North American Film Festival
2015	Bish		Giasuddin Selim	
2016	Oggatonama	Kuddus (Officer in Charge)	Tauquir Ahmed	Bangladeshi entry for the Best Foreign Language Film
2016	Rudra: The Story of a Gangster		Sayem Zafar Imami	
2016	Chokher Dekha		P A Kajol	
2016	Aadi		Taneem Rahman Angshu	Unreleased
2017	Dhaka Attack	Sajedul Karim	Dipankar Dipon	
2017	Payra		Ahmed Azim Titu	
2018	The Residence		Rana Masud	Short Film
2018	Koto Shopno Koto Asha	Wahed Rahman (From UK)	Wakil Ahmed	
2018	Asmani		M Shakhawat Hossain	
2019	Daag Hridoye		Tarek Shikder	
2019	Shapludu	Zunayed	Golam Sohrab Dodul	
2021	Mission Extreme	DC Mahbub	Sunny Sanwar and Faisal Ahmed	
2021	Nonajoler Kabbo	Talash	Rezwan Shahriar Sumit	
2022	Muntasir		Iffat Jahan Momo	
2022	Agamikal		Anjan Aich	
2022	Operation Sundarbans		Dipankar Dipon	
2022	The Beauty Circus		Mahmud Didar	
2023	Black War: Mission Extreme 2	DC Mahbub	Sunny Sanwar & Faisal Ahmed	
2023	Ekhane Nongor		Mehedi Rony	Web film on Rtv Plus
2023	Mujib: The Making of a Nation	Pakistani Army Officer	Shyam Benegal	
2023	Ashomvob		Aruna Biswas	
2023	Jontrona		Arifur Jaman Arif	
2024	Chhaya Brikkho		Bandhan Biswas	
2025	Esha Murder: Karmaphal		Sunny Sanwar	
2025	Ali		Biplob Hayder	
2026	The Difficult Bride		Rubaiyat Hossain	
2026	Thikana Bangladesh †	TBA	Anam Biswas	Post-production

=== Television ===
- Shongkito Podojatra (1992)
- Sakin Sarisuri (2009-2010)
- Bishaash (2010-2011)
- Ice Cream (2013)
- Trump Card (2013)
- The Singing Teacher (2014)
- Bodh (2015)
- Daag (2017)
- Chabial Reunion (2017)
- Tin Pagoler Holo Mela (2017)
- Oshomvabito: Unforeseen (2017)
- Made in Bangladesh (2019)
- Game Over (2019)
- Eka (2020)
- Troll (2020)
- Mashrafe Junior (2021; Present)
- Zindabahar (2022)

=== Web series ===
Year	Title	OTT	Character	Co-Artist	Director	Notes
2017	Feluda - Ghurgutiar Ghotona	Bioscope		Parambrata Chatterjee, Riddhi Sen		
2020	Ekattor	Hoichoi	Prodip	Tisha, Mithila, Iresh Zaker, Mostafizur Noor Imran, Tariq Anam Khan	Tanim Noor	
2020	August 14	Binge	Khaled	Tasnuva Tisha, Shahiduzzaman Selim, Monira Mithu, Tanvir, Shawon	Shihab Shaheen	Binge Original Web Series
2022	Nikhoj	Chorki		Shilpi Sarkar Apu, Afsana Mimi, Intekhab Dinar, Shamol Mawla, Khairul Basar, Dipannita Martin, Orchita Sporshia	Reehan Rahman	
2022	Kaiser	Hoichoi	Bachchu	Afran Nisho, Mostafizur Noor Imran, Rikita Nondini Shimu, Imtiaz Barshon and Suman Anwar	Tanim Noor	
2022	Syndicate	Chorki	Sohail		Shihab Shaheen	
2022	Karagar	Hoichoi	Father Alfred		Syed Ahmed Shawki	

=== Short film ===
- Ekjon Telapoka (2020)
