= Tariq Anam Khan =

Bangladeshi actor, director, writer and producer

- তারিক আনাম খান
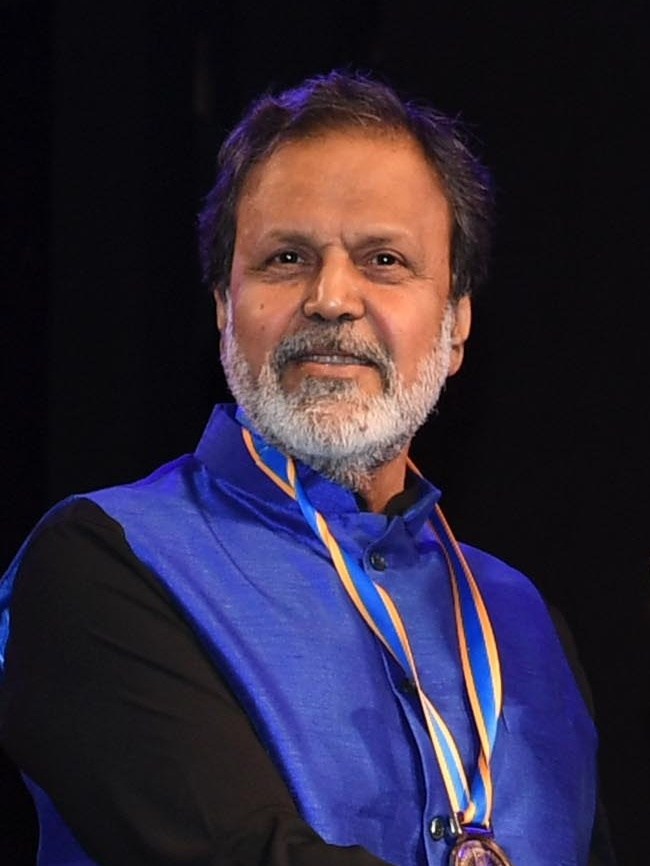
- Khan in 2023
- Born: May 10, 1953 (age 73); Satkhira, East Bengal, Pakistan
- Occupations: Actor; director; writer; producer
- Years active: 1981–present
- Spouse: Nima Rahman (m. 1985)
- Children: Ariq Anam Khan
- Awards: Full list

Tariq Anam Khan (born May 10, 1953) is a Bangladeshi actor, director, writer and producer in theatre, television, and film. He was awarded the Bangladesh National Film Award for Best Actor in a Negative Role for the film Desha: The Leader in 2014. Later in 2019, he was awarded the Best Actor award at the Bangladesh National Film Award for his performance in the film Abar Bosonto. He is the founding member and leader of the prominent Bangladeshi theatre group Natyakendra, where he holds the position of principal secretary.

Khan was a freedom fighter in the liberation war of Bangladesh in 1971.

== Early life ==
Born in Satkhira, Khan is the eldest son of Fakhrul Anam Khan and Jahanara Khanam. He has three brothers and four sisters.

=== Role as a freedom fighter in liberation war of Bangladesh ===
Khan was involved in progressive cultural and political activities in Satkhira since before the Liberation War. At the beginning of 1971, he became directly active with the resistance movement. From April 1971, along with many others, he set up a camp at Bhomra border in Satkhira. Then he went to India and engaged himself in the Liberation War organization. He was responsible for recruiting the freedom fighters, taking them to the camp for training from Bashirhat town in West Bengal. At the same time, a cultural group was formed with a few other artists. They used to perform motivational songs and plays in different camps of Sector 9.

== Career ==
In 2018, he played a missile specialist scientist in Ashiqur Rahman's action drama Super Hero, starring opposite Shakib Khan for the first time.

=== Theatre ===
Khan started his career as a theatre artist. He joined the Bangladeshi theatre group "Theatre" after his return from the National School of Drama. Later, he parted ways with Theatre due to some differences in opinion and founded "Natyakendra" on October 11, 1990, along with Jhuna Chowdhury, Tauqir Ahmed, and Nahid Ferdous Meghna. In 25 years, Natyakendra has staged 14 productions, 11 of which were directed by Khan. The group's first production, Bichchu (adapted from Molière's That Scoundrel Scapin), is considered one of the iconic productions in Bangladesh theatre history. His directed plays have performed more than 500 shows in Bangladesh and abroad.

=== Advertising ===
Khan started his career in marketing by founding the advertising firm Adshop in 1985.

He was credited as the production supervisor of the Bangladesh unit of the 2015 Hollywood film Avengers: Age of Ultron.

He started working as a marketing adviser for Akij Group in 2015.

=== Television ===
Khan has been acting in television plays for more than 30 years. He has acted in over 300 television plays telecast by all national and satellite television channels in Bangladesh. He gained popularity for his portrayal of a smuggler in the television series Tothapi (1994) directed by Zia Ansary, which was telecast on Bangladesh Television.

=== Actors Equity Bangladesh ===
On September 18, 2024, Actors Equity Bangladesh held an emergency meeting in Mohakhali, Dhaka, in response to concerns raised by artistes advocating for reforms. An interim reform committee, led by actor Tariq Anam Khan, was formed to oversee decisions for the next four months, while the current leadership retained administrative duties but refrained from making significant decisions. Despite calls for the resignation of key officials, none of the 21 committee members stepped down, and elections were expected within five months. Reform demands included formal recognition of acting as a profession, a new registration system, professional benefits, and improved work conditions for actors, such as shift systems, overtime pay, and a minimum wage.

== Personal life ==
Khan has been married to actress Nima Rahman since 1985. Her maternal grandfather was the poet Golam Mostofa. Together they have a son, Ariq Anam Khan.

== Filmography ==
Year	Film	Role	Notes	Ref.
1980	Ghuddi	Tariq		
1981	Lal Sobujer Pala	Modhu		
1985	Suruj Miah	Suruj Miah		
1997	Amar Ghor Amar Behesht			
2004	Joyjatra	Torofdar		
2006	Made in Bangladesh	DC Akhtar Uddin Khan		
2007	Aha!	Mollik Saheb		
2008	The Last Thakur	Thakur		
2010	Jaago – Dare to Dream	Coach Saffu		
2012	Ghetuputra Komola	Jomidar Chowdhury Hekmot Ali		
2014	Jonakir Aalo			
2014	Desha: The Leader	Hasan Haider		
2015	Podmo Patar Jol			
2015	Runout			
2016	Good Morning London			
2017	Peyarar Subash			
2018	Super Hero	K.M Khalil		
2019	Shapludu	Ahsanullah		
2019	Abar Boshonto	Imran Chowdhury		
2021	Mridha Vs Mridha	Ashraful Mridha		
2023	Mike			
2024	Mona: Jinn-2			
2025	Makeup	Shahbaz Khan		
2025	Taandob	Unnamed		
2025	Utshob	Mobarak		
2025	Mon Je Bojhena			
2026	Manushtike Dekho			
2026	Rockstar	Ustad Junayed		

== Television ==
- Family Friends (2022)

== Stage plays ==
=== Natyakendra ===
Year	Title	Original script	Writer	Director	Actor	No. of shows
1991	Bichchu	That Scoundrel Scapin	Molière	Yes	Yes	174
1992	Tughlaq		Girish Karnad	Yes	Yes	34
1994	Sukh	Marital Bliss	Abdel Monem Salim	Yes		23
1994	Jera	The Interrogation	Farid Kamil	Yes	Yes	23
1998	Crucible	The Crucible	Arthur Miller	Yes	Yes	13
2000	Aroj Charitammrito		Masum Reza	Yes		58
2003	Protisoron		Tauquir Ahmed		Yes	52
2004	Projapati	The Matchmaker	Thornton Wilder	Yes	Yes	50
2009	Mrito Manusher Chhaya	John Gabriel Borkman	Henrik Ibsen	Yes	Yes	3
2013	Dui Je Chilo Ek Chakor	The Servant of Two Masters	Carlo Goldoni	Yes		50
2015	Bonduk Juddho	The Trap	Alfred Farag	Yes		29
2015	Gadhar Haat	The Donkey Market	Tawfiq al-Hakim	Yes		29

== Web series ==
Year	Title	OTT	Character	Co-artist	Director	Notes
2017	Feluda	Bioscope	Tareque Hassan	Parambrata Chatterjee, Rajat Ganguly, Riddhi Sen, Shahed Ali, Dolly Johur,	Parambrata Chatterjee	
2019	Beauty and the Bullet	Bioscope		Tahsan, Afran Nisho, Emon, Momo, Mim, Mim Mantasha, Badhan Lincoln, Suborna Mustafa, Shahiduzzaman Selim, Shahed Ali	Animesh Aich	
2019	Indubala	Bioscope		Popy, ABM Sumon, Achol	Anonno Mamun	
2019	Paanch Phoron	Hoichoi				
2020	Ekattor	Hoichoi	Gul Mohammad	Nusrat Imrose Tisha, Rafiath Rashid Mithila, Iresh Zaker, Mostafizur Noor Imran, Shatabdi Wadud	Tanim Noor	
2021	Contract	ZEE5		Chanchal Chowdhury, Arifin Shuvoo, Rafiath Rashid Mithila, Zakia Bari Momo, Iresh Zaker, Aisha Khan, Shamol Mawla, Rawnak Hasan, Maznun Mizan, Jayanta Chattopadhyay, Mahmud Sazzad, Somu Chowdhury	Tanim Noor and Krishnendu Chattopadhyay	a ZEE5 web series
2021	Koshtoneer	Hoichoi		Sabila Nur, Yash, Shamol Mawla	Ashfaq Nipun	
2023	Buker Moddhye Agun	Hoichoi		Ziaul Faruq Apurba, Yash Rohan	Taneem Rahman Angshu	

== Awards ==
- Bangladesh National Film Awards – 2014 for Best Performance in a Negative Role – Desha: The Leader
- Critics Choice Awards – 2012 for Best Actor (Film) for Ghetuputra Komola in 15th Meril Prothom Alo Awards, 2013
- Bangladesh National Film Awards – 2019 for Best Actor – Abar Boshonto (2019)
