= Monwar =

Monwar is a Bangladeshi surname. Notable people with the surname include:

- Mostafa Monwar, Bangladeshi actor, writer, and screenwriter
- Mustafa Monwar (born 1935), Bangladeshi artist
