= Shatabdi =

Shatabdi means "one-hundred years" or a "century" in Sanskrit. It may refer to:

== People ==
- Shatabdi Roy, Indian Bengali actress
- Shatabdi Wadud, Bangladeshi actor

== Trains ==
- Shatabdi Express, a series of Express trains, operated by Indian Railways
- Jan Shatabdi Express, a series of Express trains, operated by Indian Railways
