= Rafiath Rashid Mithila =

Bangladeshi actress and musician

- রাফিয়াত রশিদ মিথিলা
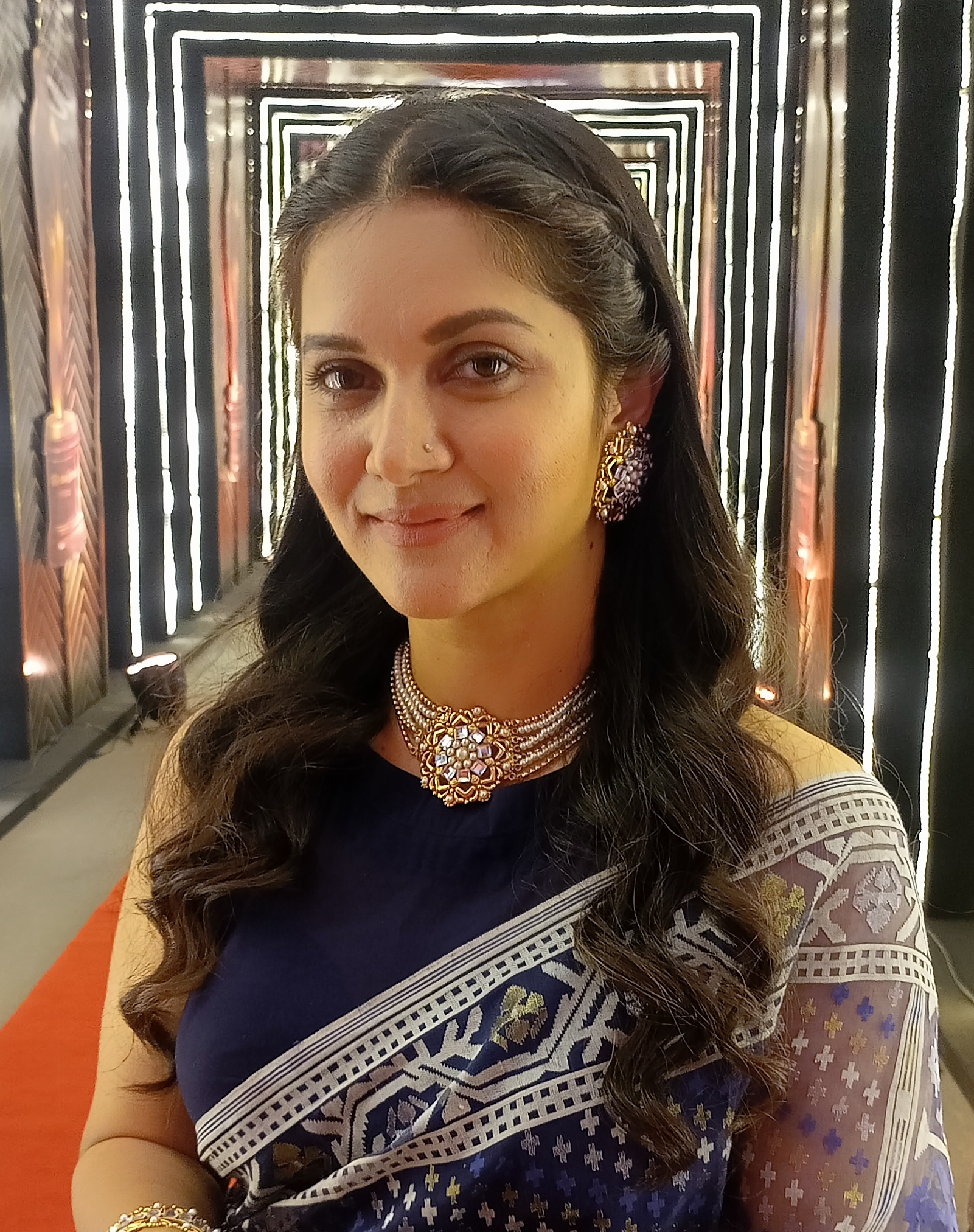
- Mithila in 2024
- Pronunciation: [ˈraɸi̯at̪ ˈroʃid̪ ˈmit̪ʰila]
- Born: 25 May 1984 (age 42)
- Education: PhD; BA
- Alma mater: University of Geneva; University of Dhaka; BRAC University
- Occupations: Actor, development worker, singer, model, writer
- Years active: 2002–present
- Spouses: Tahsan Rahman Khan (m. 2006; div. 2017); Srijit Mukherji (m. 2019)
- Children: 1
- Relatives: Shayan Chowdhury Arnob (cousin)

Rafiath Rashid Mithila (Note: Bengali pronunciation: [ˈraɸi̯at̪ ˈroʃid̪ ˈmit̪ʰila].) (Bengali pronunciation: [ˈraɸi̯at̪ ˈroʃid̪ ˈmit̪ʰila]; born 25 May 1984) is a Bangladeshi actress, singer, educator, researcher and development worker currently based in New York City, United States. Besides her film work in both Bangladesh and West Bengal, she was working as the Head of the Early Childhood Development programme in BRAC International. Currently she works at Columbia University in New York as an Associate Research Scientist. Alongside teaches at the City University of New York (CUNY) as an Adjunct Professor.

== Early life and education ==
Mithila went to Viqarunnisa Noon School and College, in Dhaka, Bangladesh. She earned both her bachelors and masters degrees in political science at the University of Dhaka. She then completed a second masters in early childhood development at BRAC University, winning the Chancellor's gold medal. She earned a B.Ed. degree from the National University in Bangladesh. She went on for further studies in the United States, studying "Contemporary Approaches to Curriculum: Instruction and Assessment" at the College of Education and Human Development of the University of Minnesota in 2010. In 2025, she earned her Doctor of Philosophy from Université de Genève. Her research topic is "Conceptualizing Early Childhood Education in Bangladesh from the lens of parents, educators and policymakers." She has joined Columbia University in 2026, where she served as a Associate Research Scientist in Irving Institute for Clinical and Translational Research.

Besides academic work, Mithila has studied Kathak, Manipuri, and Bharat Natyam dance at the Dance Academy of the Benuka Institute of Fine Arts in Bangladesh. She also received training in Nazrul Geeti, or the study of songs written and composed by Kazi Nazrul Islam, the national poet of Bangladesh, at the Hindol Music Academy. She studied art at the Nandan school, and exhibited her oil paintings at a Drik Gallery group exhibition. She was a child actor at the People's Theatre, Bangladesh.

== Career ==
=== Audiovisual media ===
She began her modeling career in 2002, while she was still at university, with the fashion house Neelanjana Palli. Her acting career was launched when she starred in the television drama Shunchen Ekjon Radio Jokeyr Golpo in 2006. She also appeared in TV commercials, and became a brand ambassador for many products. She was a model in music videos, and also acted in various dramas and telefilms. In 2022 she made her feature film debut with Bangladeshi film director and screenwriter Anonno Mamun in the film Omanush, co-starring with Nirab Hossain. She then appeared in director Sauvik Kundu's Aay Khuku Aay in India, sharing the screen with Prosenjit Chatterjee. She hosted the celebrity talk show Amar Ami on Banglavision.

=== Academics and work in early childhood education ===
Mithila was on the faculty of the English Literature and Language, Scholastica International School, Dhaka. Then she served as a guest lecturer in the Department of Early Childhood Development of the Institute of Educational Development at BRAC University in 2017. She was also a lecturer for English Language and Foundation courses at the Northern University Bangladesh. Mithila currently works as the head of Early Childhood Development at BRAC International. She works extensively in some African countries. She has been an active contributor to the West Bengal Commission for Protection of Child Rights and Swayam in West Bengal, India. She is a member of Asia-Pacific Regional Network for Early Childhood (ARNEC) and South Asia Forum of Early Childhood Development Professionals (SAFECDP). Since 2026, she works at Columbia University in New York as an Associate Research Scientist. Alongside she teaches at the City University of New York (CUNY) as an Adjunct Professor.

== Personal life ==
Mithila was married to the singer Tahsan Rahman Khan from 2006 until 2017, during which they had a daughter born in 2013. She married Indian film director Srijit Mukherji in 2019.

== Works ==
=== Television dramas and tele-films ===
Year	Name	Co-actor	Director
2006	Shunchen Ekjon Radio Jokeyr Golpo	Hasan Masud	Redoan Rony
2007	Modhuren Shomapoyet	Tahsan Rahman Khan	Ashfaque Nipun
2007	Ghum	Emon	Ishtiak Ahmed Rumel
2008 - 2009	Housefull	Abul Hayat, Sumaiya Shimu, Mosharrrof Karim, Schumon Patwary, Monira Mithun	Redoan Rony and Iftekhar Ahmed Fahmi
2008	X-factor	Ziaul Faruq Aburba	Shihab Shaheen
2008	Nabab Gunda	Ahmed Rubel, Abul Hayat, Tania	Iftekhar Ahmed Fahmi
2008	Ei Jibon	Iresh Zaker	Shihab Shaheen
2009	Ontora	Ziaul Faruq Apurba	Chayanika Chowdhury
2009	Tor Jonno Priyota	Partha Barua	Munna
2009	Proof Reader	Abul Hayat	Redoan Rony
2011	Denmohor	Mosharrof Karim	Mostofa Kamal Raz
2011	Shedin Dekha Hoyechilo	Afran Nisho	Kaushik Shankar Das
2011	Amar Streer Atotayee	Afran Nisho	Kaushik Shankar Das
2012	Shuvo Prapti	Niloy Alamgir	Kaushik Shankar Das
2012	Hit Wicket	Tahsan Rahman Khan	Syed Mohammad Ishrafil
2012	Shomoy Churi	Tahsan Rahman Khan	Amitabh Reza Chowdhury
2013	Land phone er dingulote prem	Tahsan Rahman Khan	Ashfaq Nipun
2014	Uttorer Baranday Dokhina Hawa	Apurba	Sunny Chowdhury
2014	He & She	Tahsan Rahman Khan	Ashfaque Nipun
2014	Anger Story	Jon Kabir	Mabrur Rashid Bannah
2014	Abar Devdas	Afran Nisho	Imraul Rafat
2014	Flipper	Ziaul Faruq Apurba	Taneem Rahman Angshu
2015	Shukher Charpotro	Tahsan Rahman Khan	Ashfaque Nipun
2015	Promise	Jon Kabir	Mabrur Rashid Bannah
2015	Cry baby cry	Jon Kabir	Mabrur Rashid Bannah
2015	Prem Keboli Ekti Rashayonik Bikria	Tahsan Rahman Khan	Shihab Shaheen
2015	Mr. & Mrs.	Tahsan Rahman Khan	Mizanur Rahman Aryan
2015	Amar Golpe Tumi	Tahsan Rahman Khan	Mizanur Rahman Aryan
2015	Kothopokothon	Tahsan Rahman Khan	Mizanur Rahman Aryan
2015	Selfiebaaj	Mishu Sabbir	Wasim Sitar
2016	After Marriage	Jon Kabir	Mabrur Rashid Bannah
2016	Anti-clock	Jon Kabir, Ziaul Faruq Apurba	Imraul Rafat
2016	Bhalobashar Pongtimala	Iresh Zaker	Shihab Shaheen
2016	Batch 27	Ziaul Faruq Apurba	Mizanur Rahman Aryan
2016	Thikana	Ziaul Faruq Apurba	Mizanur Rahman Aryan
2016	Chirkuter shobdo	Ziaul Faruq Apurba	Mehedi Hasan Jony
2017	Batch 27 - The Last Page	Ziaul Faruq Apurba	Mizanur Rahman Aryan
2017	Neel phoring er golpo	Ziaul Faruq Apurba	Mehedi Hasan Jony
2017	Divorce	Afran Nisho	Shihab Shaheen
2017	Punch clip	Iresh Zaker	Redoan Rony
2018	Amar Kotha	FS Nayeem	Iftekhar Ahmed Fahmi
2018	Biyer Dawat Roilo	Manoj Pramanik	Redoan Rony
2018	Bhalo Cheler Khoje	Ferdous Hasan Neville	Redoan Rony
2019	Choto Pakhi	Irfan Sajjad	Goutam Koiri
2019	Life Insurance	Ziaul Faruq Aburba	Mizanur Rahman Aryan
2019	Timeline	Manoj Pramanik	Goutam Koiri
2019	Obosheshe Bhalobeshe	Rahat	Mushfiq Kallol
2019	Prothom Prem	Manoj Pramanik	Mushfiq Kallol
2019	Crystal er Rajhnaash	Irfan Sajjad	Abu Hayat Mahmud
2019	Priceless	Irfan Sajjad	Goutam Koiri
2020	Tonatuni Raag Korona	Rawnak Hasan	Rawnak Hasan
2021	Shahoshika	Manoj Pramanik, Tanjin Tisha, Tareen Jahan	Taneem Rahman Angshu
2021	Ghurni	Irfan Sajjad	Rakesh Basu
2021	Seasonal Chor	Irfan Sajjad	Rakesh Basu
2021	Mobiner Shongshar	Zahid Hasan	Sydur Rahman Russel
2021	Lover	Jovan	Preety Dutta
2021	Senior	Khairul Bashar	Preety Dutta
2021	Together	Tawsif Mahbub	Preety Dutta
2021	Shukhi Atma	Partha Barua	Hasan Rezaul
2021	Being Woman	Irfan Sajjad	Hasan Rezaul
2021	Midnight Sun	Iresh Zaker	Aarif Ahnaf
2021	Ke Ami		Goutam Koiri
2024	Renu	Arosh Khan	Mabur Rashid Bannah

=== Songs, lyrics and music videos ===
Year	Song and Album	Composer	Singer	Lyricist	Model
2004	Brittalpona, Kothopokothon	Tahsan Rahman Khan	Yes	No	No
2005	Moyna Go, Habib Wahid ft. Julie		No	No	Yes
2005	3 Songs, Krittodasher Nirban	Tahsan Rahman Khan	No	Yes	No
2006	6 Songs, Ichche	Tahsan Rahman Khan	Yes	Yes	No
2007	Rodela Dupure, Mixed	Tahsan Rahman Khan	Yes	Yes	No
2008	Jhum Dupure, Nei	Tahsan Rahman Khan	No	Yes	No
2009	Ogochore, 3rd Person Singular Number (Film)	Tahsan Rahman Khan	Yes	Yes	No
2015	Tomar Amar, Title track of Mr. & Mrs	Sajid Sarkar	Yes	Yes	No
2015	Chile Amar, Title track of Kokhopokothon	Sajid Sarkar	Yes	No	No
2015	Amar Golpe Tumi, Title track of Amar Golpe Tumi	Sajid Sarkar	Yes	No	No
2016	Thikana, Title track of Thikana	Tahsin	Yes	No	No
2017	Ghum, Ghum	Habib Wahid	No	No	Yes
2019	Ki Hole Ki Hoto, Single	Pradyut Chatterjea ft. Arnob	No	No	Yes
2020	In a manner of speaking, Cover (Original song by Nouvelle Vague)	Maimun Khan ft. Mithila	Yes	No	Yes

=== Television and radio host ===
Year	Name	Channel/Platform	Creator/Producer
2017-2019	My Own World (In Bengali: Amar Ami)	Banglavision	Sajjad Hussein
2018	The tale of growing up (In Bengali: Berey Othar Golpo)	Radio Shadhin	Rafiath Rashid Mithila & Radio Shadhin
2020	Much More Secret Thoughts (In Bengali: Onek Ojana Kotha)	Zee5	Zee5

=== Films ===
Year	Film	Role	Co-Artist	Director	Status
2022	Amanush	Nudrat	Nirab	Anonno Mamun	Released
2022	Mayaa	Mayaa	Kamaleshwar Mukherjee	Raajhorshee De	Screening at Film Festivals
2022	Neetishastra	Geeta	Basabdatta Chatterjee	Arunava Khasnobish	Screening at Film Festivals
2022	Aay Khuku Aay		Prosenjit Chatterjee	Souvik Kundu	
2023	Nuliachorir Sonar Pahar	Nelly	Emon	Lubna Sharmin	Post Production
2023	Meghla	Meghla	Gaurab Chatterjee	Arnab Middya	Post Production
2023	Maya		Gaurav Chakraborty, Kamleshwar Mukherjee, Rahul Banerjee, Tanushree Chakraborty, Sudipta Chakraborty, Koneenica Banerjee, Richa Sharma, Devleena Kumar, Ratsree Dutta	Raajhorshee De	Released
2024	O Abhagi	Abhagi	Sayan Ghosh as Rasik, Subrata Dutta as Jamindar, Debjani Chatterjee as Ginni Ma, Rj Jinia as Tagor, Krishno Banerjee as Kesta, Sourav Halder as Kangali, Ishan Mazumder as Yamraj	Anirban Chakraborty	Released
2024	Aranyer Prachin Probad	Devjani	Jeetu Kamal	Dulal Dey	Post Production
2024	Kajolrekha	Konkon Dasi	Mondira Chakroborty, Sariful Razz, Rafiath Rashid Mithila, Sadia Ayman	Giasuddin Selim	Released
2025	Jole Jwole Tara	Tara	FS Nayeem, Azad Abul Kalam, Fazlur Rahman Babu	Arun Chowdhury	Released

=== Short film ===
Year	Name	Co-actor	Director
2018	Mukhomukhi	Gaurav Chakraborty	Partha Sen
2018	Ekti Sobuj Bag	Manoj Pramanik	Iftekhar Ahmed Fahmi
2018	WTF (Welcome To Family)	Intekhab Dinar	Pritam
2018	Blood Rose	Iresh Zaker	Redoan Rony
2019	Joggota	Apurba	Mizanur Rahman Aryan
2019	Meawo		Taneem Rahman Angshu
2020	Dure Thaka Kacher Manush	Vikram Chatterjee	Shahrear Polock
2020	Khola Janala	Ayra Tehreem Khan, Iffath Rashid Missouri	Goutam Koiri
2021	Tiya Pakhi	Mir Rabbi	Abu Hayat Mahmud

=== Web series ===
Year	Title	OTT	Character	Director	Notes
2020	Ekattor	Hoichoi	Ruhi	Tanim Noor	Released
2021	Contract	ZEE5	Rumana	Tanim Noor and Krishnendu Chattopadhyay	Released
2021	Unoloukik	Chorki		Robiul Alam Robi	Released
2022	Montu Pilot Season 2	Hoichoi	Bonhi	Debaloy Bhattacharya	Released
2023	Myself Allen Swapan	Chorki	Shayla	Shihab Shaheen	Best actress nomination in the Blender's Choice the Daily Star OTT & Digital Content Award 2024
2024	Baaji	Chorki	Zinia	Arifur Rahman	Released
2025	Myself Allen Swapan Season 2				

== Awards ==
Year	Award name	Awarded For	Awarded by	Place	Result
2025	Best Actress	Kajolrekha	Television Reporters Association of Bangladesh (TRAB) 2025		
2025	Best Actress	Jole Jwole Tara	BIFA award 2025		
2024	Best Actress	O Abhagi	14th Dada Saheb Phalke Film Festival 2024		Win
2024	Best Actress	Myself Allen Swapan	BIFA award 2024	Dhaka	Win
2024	Best Actress	Myself Allen Swapan	The Daily Star Blenders Choice Digital and OTT Awards 2024		Nominated
2024	Best Actress	Kajolrekha	Bangladesh Achievers Award 2024		Win
2024	Best Actress	Kajolrekha	Television Reporters Unity of Bangladesh 2024		Win
2023	Best Actress	Myself Allen Swapan	Meril Prothom Alo Award	Dhaka, Bangladesh	Nominated
2023	Best Actress	Myself Allen Swapan	Bangladesh Achievers Award 2023		Win
2023	Best Actress	Montu Pilot 2	Iconic Star Award 2023	India	Win
2023	Best Actress	Mayaa	Maa Durga Samman Award 2023	India	Win
2022	Best Supporting Actress and Maitri Award	Mayaa	Telegana Bengali Film Festival 2022		Win
	Best Actress		Meril prothom Alo Award 2013, 2015, 2016, 2017, 2024 (Myself Allen Swapan)		Nominated

== Bibliography ==
=== Journal articles ===
- Rashid, Rafiath; Raza, WA; Kabir, MM (2019). "Factors affecting early grade educational attainment: Evidence from South Sudan". International Journal of Educational Development (65): 92–97.
- Rashid, Rafiath; Jahan, SN (2021). "Exploring play-based pedagogy in government preprimary classrooms of Bangladesh". International Research in Early Childhood Education. 11 (1): 19–36.
- Rashid, Rafiath; Sharmin, Nazia; Dutta, Notan C; Nath, Samir Ranjan (2010). "Education Under Gram Daridro Bimochan Committee: Present Status and Future Directions". BRAC, Research and Evaluation Division.

=== Books ===
- Into Tanzania's Island (Bengali: Tanzaniyar Dwipe) ISBN 978-984-95319-4-4
- Searching Lion in Africa (Bengali: Afrikay Singher Khoje) ISBN 978-984-96105-5-7
- First day at School (Bengali: School er Prothom Din)
- Red Balloon (Bengali: Laal Balloon)
- Ayra and Mother's Adventure (Bengali: Ayra aar Maaer Obhijaan).
