= Mostafizur Noor Imran =

Bangladeshi actor

- মোস্তাফিজুর নূর ইমরান
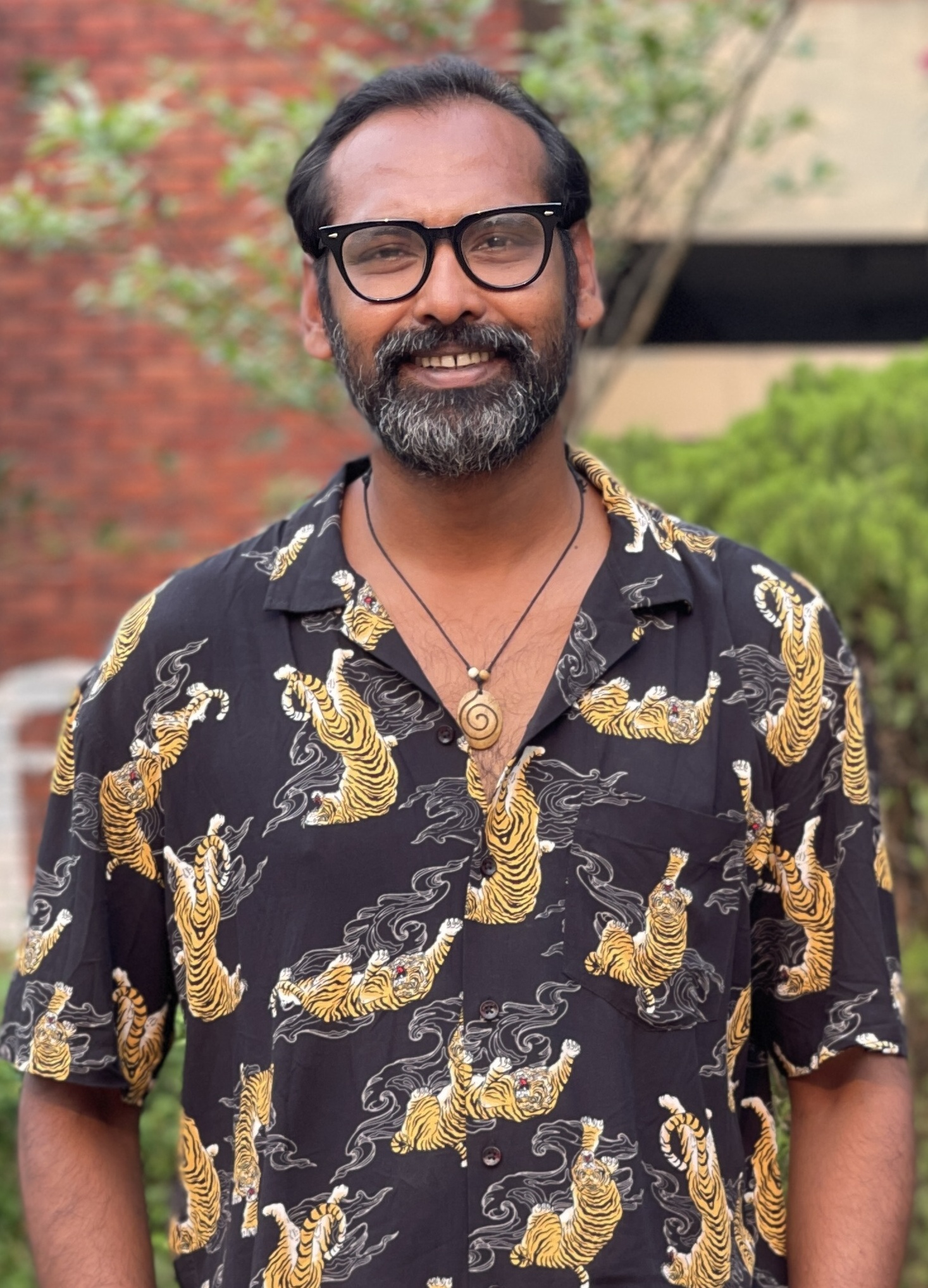
- Imran in 2026
- Born: 1 January 1989 (age 37); Bagerhat, Bangladesh
- Citizenship: Bangladeshi
- Education: Jahangirnagar University
- Occupation: Actor
- Years active: 2007–present
- Spouse: Nazia Haque Orsha (m. 2024)

Mostafizur Noor Imran (born 1 January 1989) is a Bangladeshi actor, who has gained recognition through his performances in dramas, films, and television shows.

== Early life ==
Imran was born in Bagerhat. In 2000, he joined the "Bagerhat Theater". He moved to Dhaka for study and acting, and enrolled in Jahangirnagar University, where he has completed his master's degree in Drama and Dramatics.

== Career ==
Imran started his career in 2007 by acting in a TV fiction titled "Paunadar". In 2009, he became the third runner-up in NTV's "Super Hero-Super Heroine" contest.

After appearing for 6 seconds in the film Guerrilla (2011), the following year he got a chance to play the lead role in a film titled "Shimanter Choruibhati". But the film was not released for some reason.

== Filmography ==
Key
†	Denotes films that have not yet been released

=== Films ===
Year	Films	Role	Notes	Ref.
2011	Guerrilla	A freedom fighter	Debut film	
2014	Olpo Olpo Premer Golpo	Nayeem		
2015	Gariwala	Garage owner		
2018	Iti, Tomari Dhaka	Khairul	He appeared in the part 'Extra'	
2019	Alpha	Kaali Hizra		
2022	Sahosh	Raihan	Released on Chorki	
2022	Ei Muhurte	Tiger Hunter	Released on Chorki	
2023	Jahan	Shihab	Released on Chorki	
2025	Jole Jwole Tara	Aslam		
2026	Roid	Sadhu	Selected for the International Film Festival Rotterdam	

=== TV/Web series ===
Year	Title	Role	Director	TV/OTT	Ref.
2017	A Million to One	Imran Ali		Amazon Prime Video	
2020	Ekattor	Captain Siraj	Tanim Noor	Hoichoi	
2021	Mohanagar	ASI Moloy Kumar	Ashfaque Nipun	Hoichoi	
2021	Jaago Bahey	Pakistani military officer		Chorki	
2021	Sugar Free	Liton Adhikari Pintu	RB Pritam	Chorki	
2022	Kaiser	Amlan Abedin Chowdhury	Tanim Noor	Hoichoi	
2024	Rongila Kitab	Prodeep	Anam Biswas	Hoichoi	
2025	Feu	Marshall	Sukorno Shahed Dhiman	Chorki	
2025	Gulmohor	Rana	Syed Ahmed Shawki	Chorki	

== Personal life ==
In 2024, Imran married actress and model Nazia Haque Orsha.
