= Shapludu (film) =

Bangladeshi film

- Theatrical Release Poster
- Directed by: Golam Sohrab Dodul
- Written by: Golam Sohrab Dodul; Shahjahan Sourav
- Produced by: Bengal Multimedia Limited
- Starring: Arifin Shuvoo; Bidya Sinha Saha Mim
- Cinematography: Raju Raj
- Edited by: Md. Kalam
- Music by: Hridoy Khan; Bappa Mazumder
- Production company: Bengal Multimedia Limited
- Distributed by: Bengal Multimedia Limited
- Release date: 27 September 2019
- Country: Bangladesh
- Language: Bengali

Shapludu (Bengali: সাপলুডু) is a Bangladeshi political thriller by Golam Sohrab Dodul starring Arifin Shuvoo and Bidya Sinha Saha Mim which was released in theaters across Bangladesh on 27 September 2019.

== Plot ==
Irfan has been the moral political guardian to Arman the way Ahsan has been to him. Then why does a series of unfortunate events- female trafficking, drug smuggling, disappearing of a foreign journalist, a bomb blast- occur in their small town of Thanchi? Who are they that prey on the aborigines at night? Who are they, who roam around with blood-spattered faces and weapons in hand during Vaisavi? Why does Arman continuously end up as the scapegoat? Where do someone's gains lie in Arman's death?

While finding answers to these questions, Arman falls into a rabbit hole of ghoulish truths, making him lose his credence. Right there starts Arman's striking journey to save Pushpa, and his country.

It is a story of Arman's love for Pushpa, of Ahsan and Irfan's love for their country. In some ways, it is a story of selling out your country, of Titli's life in orphanage, of Nazrul's sacrifice, and of Arman's mother's death. In hindsight, it is a story patriotism.

Society has its fair share of different types of people. Some amongst them resort to using others for their benefits; sometimes putting the entire society, even their nation at stake. They wear masquerades of noblemen. But once people hit rock bottom, they possess an inevitable ability to capsize and use those masquerades as a boomerang to the impostors. 'Shapludu' is a tale of those who turn the tables; a suspense thriller based on those who give those swindlers a taste of their own medicine in order to save themselves, their loved ones, and their nation.

== Cast ==
- Arifin Shuvoo as Arman
- Bidya Sinha Saha Mim as Pushpa
- Zahid Hasan as Irfan
- Tariq Anam Khan as Ahsanullah, Member of Parliament
- Salauddin Lavlu Nazrul Islam, ADC of DB
- Shatabdi Wadud as Zunayed
- Sushoma Sarkar as Flora
- Runa Khan as Salma Begum
- Marzuk Russell as Kibria
- Shilpi Sarkar Apu as Arman's mother
- Shahed Ali as Major Rustom
- Moushumi Hamid as Nazrul's wife
- Intekhab Dinar as Saqlain Morshed
- Boishakhi Ghosh as Mohua
- Israt Punam
- Abu Jahid Bhuyan
