= Gulmohor =

- Poster
- Genre: Mystery-drama
- Written by: Syed Ahmed Shawki; Maruf Pratik
- Screenplay by: Syed Ahmed Shawki; Maruf Pratik
- Story by: Syed Ahmed Shawki; Maruf Pratik
- Directed by: Syed Ahmed Shawki
- Composer: Ruslan Rehman
- Country of origin: Bangladesh
- Original language: Bengali
- No. of seasons: 1
- No. of episodes: 8

Production
- Executive producer: Mir Mukarram Hossain
- Producers: Redoan Rony; Saleh Sobhan Auneem
- Production location: Bangladesh
- Cinematography: Barkat Hossain Polash
- Editor: Saleh Sobhan Auneem
- Production companies: Chorki; Film Syndicate

Original release
- Network: Chorki
- Release: 15 May 2025

Gulmohor is a 2025 Bangladeshi mystery-drama web series directed by Syed Ahmed Shawki and produced by Redoan Rony under the banner of Chorki and Film Syndicate. It stars Saswata Chatterjee, Sara Zaker, Intekhab Dinar, Mostafizur Noor Imran, Sushoma Sarkar, Mir Naufel Ashrafi Jisan, Sarika Sabah, Taufiqul Islam Emon, and Mostafa Monwar. It was streaming on Chorki on 15 May 2025.

The web series won the 27th Meril-Prothom Alo Awards at the Critics' Choice award for Best Web Series category and Syed Ahmed Shawki received the Best Director award for the web series.

== Cast ==
- Saswata Chatterjee
- Sara Zaker
- Intekhab Dinar
- Mostafizur Noor Imran
- Sushoma Sarkar
- Mir Naufel Ashrafi Jisan
- Sarika Sabah
- Taufiqul Islam Emon
- Mostafa Monwar

== Reception ==
=== Critical response ===
Jannatul Naym Pieal of The Business Standard praised for its immersive direction and authentic storytelling. Despite a familiar plot and the strong ensemble performances particularly Mostafizur Noor Imran's highlighting the series as a grounded socio-political family drama.

Pritha Paramita Nag of Prothom Alo praised Syed Ahmed Shawki's Chorki series Gulmohor for its nuanced exploration of family conflict and partition trauma and the strong technical craft and lead performances by Mostafizur Noor Imran, Sara Zaker and Saswata Chatterjee, concluding that the show provides a fresh narrative despite its deliberate pacing.

== Awards ==
Award	Category	Recipients	Result	Ref.
Meril-Prothom Alo Awards	Best Web Series	Gulmohor	Won	
Meril-Prothom Alo Awards	Best Director	Syed Ahmed Shawki	Won	
Meril-Prothom Alo Awards	Best Actor	Mostafizur Noor Imran	Nominated	
