= Karagar =

Bangladeshi drama streaming television series

- Promotional poster of Part 2
- Genre: Thriller
- Created by: Syed Ahmed Shawki
- Screenplay by: Neamoth Ullah Masum; Shuhan Rizwan; Siddiq Ahamed; Rasheduzzaman Rakib; Syed Ahmed Shawki
- Story by: Neamoth Ullah Masum
- Directed by: Syed Ahmed Shawki
- Starring: Chanchal Chowdhury; Intekhab Dinar; Tasnia Farin; FS Nayeem
- Composers: Ruslan Rehman; Adeep Singh Manki; Anindit Roy
- Country of origin: Bangladesh
- Original language: Bengali
- No. of seasons: 2
- No. of episodes: 14

Production
- Production location: Bangladesh
- Cinematography: Barkat Hossain Palash
- Editor: Saleh Sobhan Auneem
- Production companies: Film Noir; Film Syndicate

Original release
- Network: Hoichoi
- Release: 19 August – 22 December 2022

Karagar (lit. 'The prison') or Cell 145 is a thriller web series directed by Syed Ahmed Shawki that started streaming on the Bengali OTT platform Hoichoi from 19 August 2022. Hoichoi announced their upcoming new five web series, Karagar is one of them, Based on Bangladesh, the series features Chanchal Chowdhury, Intekhab Dinar, Tasnia Farin and FS Nayeem in the lead roles.

After the release of the first part of the web series, it gained popularity among the audience and became the talk of the town. The popularity of this Bangladeshi series even spread to India. Karagar helped the OTT platform Hoichoi grow their business in Bangladesh.

== Premise ==
Akashnagar Jail is a prison in Bangladesh. Cell No. 145 of this jail has been closed since 1971. It is soon known that there is a prisoner inside that cell. Senior authorities break the old lock of the cell and enter it. When asked how he came to be in this cell, the mute prisoner hinted that he had been imprisoned for killing Mir Jafar in c. 1771 and had been transferred to different prisons at various times including Kala Pani Jail.

== Cast and characters ==
=== Main ===
- Chanchal Chowdhury as David Adam alias the mystery man
  - Dibbo Joyti as young David Adam
- Intekhab Dinar as Mostak Ahmed, the prison warden of Akashnagar Jail
- Tasnia Farin as Maha
- Shatabdi Wadud as Alfred
- Tanvin Sweety as Dia Guha, the mysterious woman in the burqa
- Mir Naufel Ashrafi Jisan as Raju, a prisoner and the associate of David Adam

=== Supporting ===
- Jayanta Chattopadhyay as Gulzar, one of prisoners
- Afzal Hossain as Mohabbat Ali, the hangman
- Bijori Barkatullah as Panna, wife of Mostak
- FS Nayeem as Ashfaq Mawla, an officer of Detective Branch and friend of Mostak
- AK Azad Shetu as Abul Khayer, a prison officer
- Partho Sheikh as prisoner Sajib, son of Mostak and Panna
- Zahid Hasan Shovon as Humayun Kabir, IG Prison
- Sarker Raunak Ripon as Aslam
- Omar Masum as Ataur
- Abdullah al Sentu

== Episodes ==
Series	Episodes	Originally released
1	7	19 August 2022
2	7	22 December 2022

=== Part 1 ===
The first season of Karagar was released on 19 August 2022 with seven episodes. In the first season, Mostak meets the mysterious prisoner who claims that he killed Mir Jafar. Maha is the interpreter who interprets his statement to police.

No. overall	Episode	Directed by	Written by	Original release date	Duration (minutes)
1	Resurrection	Syed Ahmed Shawki	Neamoth Ullah Masum	19 August 2022	23
2	Black Sheep	Syed Ahmed Shawki	Neamoth Ullah Masum	19 August 2022	21
3	Life and death	Syed Ahmed Shawki	Neamoth Ullah Masum	19 August 2022	27
4	History and mystery	Syed Ahmed Shawki	Neamoth Ullah Masum	19 August 2022	31
5	Light and shadow	Syed Ahmed Shawki	Neamoth Ullah Masum	19 August 2022	28
6	Spirit and ghosts	Syed Ahmed Shawki	Neamoth Ullah Masum	19 August 2022	25
7	Lost sheep	Syed Ahmed Shawki	Neamoth Ullah Masum	19 August 2022	33

=== Part 2 ===
On 21 September 2022, the Hoichoi authority announced that the second part of the web series will be released in December of the same year on the occasion of the sixth anniversary of the establishment of their platform. On 4 November, the date of Part 2 was fixed on 15 December 2022. Later the date was changed to 22 December due to the 2022 FIFA World Cup.

No. overall	Episode	Directed by	Written by	Original release date	Duration (minutes)
1	The Birth	Syed Ahmed Shawki	Neamoth Ullah Masum	22 December 2022	23
2	The Homecoming	Syed Ahmed Shawki	Neamoth Ullah Masum	22 December 2022	32
3	The Brother	Syed Ahmed Shawki	Neamoth Ullah Masum	22 December 2022	28
4	The Father	Syed Ahmed Shawki	Neamoth Ullah Masum	22 December 2022	22
5	The Mother	Syed Ahmed Shawki	Neamoth Ullah Masum	22 December 2022	28
6	The Son	Syed Ahmed Shawki	Neamoth Ullah Masum	22 December 2022	35
7	The Motherland	Syed Ahmed Shawki	Neamoth Ullah Masum	22 December 2022	36

== Production ==
"With 'Karagar' I wanted to tell a story that seems unbelievable on the surface, but has layers of dark truth underneath."

— Syed Ahmed Shawki

Neamoth Ullah Masum got the concept for it from "Kaktaal" (lit. 'Coincidence'), a Bangladeshi rock band from the Old Dhaka Central Jail, whose members are temporary and briefly defected to get out of the jail. Before this web series, Syed Ahmed Shawki and Neamoth Ullah Masum worked in the web series Taqdeer. Neamoth suggested the director to make Karagar. The duo completed the web series concept in 3–4 months. The story of the web series was then written for a year. While writing the story, suggestions were taken from the crew and actors of the web series. The director had already decided that Chanchal Chowdhury would be cast in the lead role of the web series. For the ideas for the series, director Shawki formed a panel of writers with Neamoth Ullah Masum, Suhan Rizwan, Rasheduzzaman Rakib and Siddiq Ahmed who helped in the pre-production of the series.

The filming was done for two consecutive weeks. Chanchal fell ill due to continuous acting in the unsanitary environment of the prison. The production team had to do a lot of historical research to write its plot. In September 2021, Hoichoi announced the release of the Karagar web series to mark its fifth anniversary. The two parts of the web series have been shot simultaneously. Most of its scenes were shot in Old Dhaka Central Jail which is currently closed for renovation work. Atia Rahman did the make-up work of the actors including Chanchal, who tried to make his look realistic. For the story, Chanchal and Farin had to learn sign language for three months. A sign language teacher was present on location during the filming. After the release of Part 1 on 19 August 2022, post-production work on Part 2 of the web series began in September 2022.

== Reception ==
=== Influence ===
Miraz Hossain of The Business Standard wrote about the first part "Taqdeer famed director Syed Ahmed Shawki makes the series gripping with suspense intensifying in every episode, but the ending is so abrupt, unexpected, and intriguing that it feels incomplete, almost like not drinking water after a full meal." Zahid Akbar of The Daily Star thinks part 1 of the series especially with its unsolved mysteries and Chanchal Chowdhury's performance left such an impression on the audience that they kept trying to solve the mysteries and the series became the talk of the town. As a result of this, the audience eagerly awaited the release of part 2.

=== Critical response ===
==== Part 1 ====
After the release of part 1 of the web series, it and its performers received positive response from the audience. The art and entertainment desk of The Daily Star called it a unique storyline web series. Poorna Banerjee of The Times of India rated Part one 4/5 and praised the performance of Chanchal Chowdhury, the lead actor of the web series. Saykot Kabir Shayok of The Business Standard said about the web series, "If keeping the audience hooked from the beginning to the end was the only criteria for a show to shine then Karagar season one passed with flying colours". Shadique Mahbub Islam of The Financial Express praised its plot and screenplay. Jannatul Naym Pieal of The Business Post said its editing was average and it disappointed at the end of the first part, but he praised its background music. According to Biswadeep Dey of Sangbad Pratidin, Karagar has managed to gain popularity in both Bengals. Calling it an "ambitious production", Priyanka Chowdhury of The Daily Star does not think that this unfinished web series is unsatisfactory. She thinks that the theological and mystical settings is perfect for the series. Soumya Mukhopadhyay, the chief operating officer of Hoichoi, said Karagar has contributed a lot to its business growth in Bangladesh.

==== Part 2 ====
According to Pritha Biswas of Anandabazar Patrika, part two revealed the unsolved mysteries of the previous part, but some of them were unsatisfactory. Sub plots are not given importance in this part. The series managed to create suspense but failed to create emotion among the audience. Besides, she wrote "the actors have a lot of credit behind the huge popularity of this series". Biswadip Dey of Sangbad Pratidin felt that despite being a thriller work, part 2 lacked any trace of thriller element. But according to him it represented the Bengali culture and turned into an excellent web series despite refraining from using sexuality and slang for popularity. According to Jannatul Naym Pieal of The Business Post, the story is fantastic but the director failed to convey it to the audience in the series properly in the second part. Poorna Banerjee of The Times of India praised the cinematography of Karagar but criticized it for having plot holes and lacking satisfactory answers to the mysteries. According to her, it would have been better to develop the story slowly instead of ending it abruptly. Agnivo Niyogi of The Telegraph thinks it was better to exclude unnecessary subplots from part 2 and the sequel is worthy to watch. According to Muhammad Asadullah of Bdnews24.com it has the potential to be the best web series of 2022. To him, it also raised the standard of Bengali-language web series. According to Miraz Hossain of The Business Standard, Part 2 is good, but compared to Part 1, it may seem worse. However, he praised Naufel who played the role of Raju and called him the star of the part. According to Razia Sultana Jenni of Amader Shomoy, the series lost its unpredictability due to the introduction of the Bangladesh Liberation War in the plot of Part 2 and from that part it turned from thriller to melodrama. As a result, the creator of the series lost the opportunity to bring novelty to its story.

=== Accolades ===
Year	Award	Category	Winner	Result	Ref.
2022	Blender's Choice-The Daily Star OTT Awards	Best Actor (critic's choice)	Chanchal Chowdhury	Won	
2022	Blender's Choice-The Daily Star OTT Awards	Best Actress (critic's choice)	Tasnia Farin	Won	
2022	Blender's Choice-The Daily Star OTT Awards	Best Supporting Actor	Intekhab Dinar	Won	
2022	Blender's Choice-The Daily Star OTT Awards	Best Director	Syed Ahmed Shawki	Won	
2022	Blender's Choice-The Daily Star OTT Awards	Best Cinematographer	Barkat Hossain Polash	Won	
2022	Blender's Choice-The Daily Star OTT Awards	Best Script Writer (Story)	Neamoth Ullah Masum	Won	
2022	Blender's Choice-The Daily Star OTT Awards	Best Makeup Artist	Atia Rahman	Won	
2022	Blender's Choice-The Daily Star OTT Awards	Best Background Score	Ruslan Rehman	Won	
2022	Blender's Choice-The Daily Star OTT Awards	Best Drama/Series		Won	
