= Roid (film) =

2026 Bangladeshi film

- Theatrical release poster
- Bengali: রইদ
- Literally: Sunshine
- Directed by: Mejbaur Rahman Sumon
- Screenplay by: Mejbaur Rahman Sumon; Jaheen Faruque Amin; Siddiq Ahmed; Sukorno Shahed Dhiman
- Story by: Mejbaur Rahman Sumon; Selina Banu Moni
- Produced by: Mushfiqur Rahman Manzu; Mejbaur Rahman Sumon; Shimul Chandra Biswas; Tanveer Hossain; Tanveer Ahmed Shovon
- Starring: Mostafizur Noor Imran; Nazifa Tushi; Ahsabul Yamin Riad
- Cinematography: Xoaher Musavvir
- Edited by: Sazal Alok
- Music by: Rasheed Sharif Shoaib
- Production companies: Bongo; Facecard Production
- Release dates: 2 February 2026 (IFFR); 28 May 2026 (Bangladesh)
- Running time: 109 minutes
- Country: Bangladesh
- Language: Bengali

Roid (Bengali: রইদ, lit. 'Sunshine') is a 2026 Bangladeshi mystery-drama film directed by Mejbaur Rahman Sumon, co-written with Jaheen Faruque Amin, Siddiq Ahmed and Sukorno Shahed Dhiman, and based on a story by Mejbaur Rahman Sumon and Selina Banu Moni. It stars Mostafizur Noor Imran and Nazifa Tushi, with Ahsabul Yamin Riad, Gazi Rakayet, and Tutul Fakir in supporting roles.

The film had its world premiere in the Tiger Competition of the 55th International Film Festival Rotterdam on 2 February. It was theatrically released in Bangladesh on 28 May. It was also selected as the Bangladeshi entry for the Best International Feature Film at the 99th Academy Awards.

== Plot ==
The story revolves around Sadhu, his crazy wife, and the palm tree next to their house, essentially recreating a thousand-year-old narrative. However, this re-creation captures not the present of time, but the present of feeling. The atmosphere and sense of life of rural Bengal, as imagined by painter SM Sultan, are deeply intertwined throughout every layer of the film.

== Cast ==
- Mostafizur Noor Imran as Sadhu
- Nazifa Tushi as Sadhu's wife
- Ahsabul Yamin Riad as Panna
- Gazi Rakayet
- Tutul Fakir

== Production ==
=== Development ===
Mejbaur Rahman Sumon announced the film Roid in 2021. Initially, actress Jaya Ahsan was associated as a producer and received a government grant of ৳60 lakhs in the 2020-21 fiscal year. However, due to the delay in starting the work, Ahsan returned the grant. The film was later produced by Bongo and the Sumon's Facecard Production was associated as a co-producer.

=== Pre-production ===
Roid film's team spent almost two years for searching locations for filming. Finally, they selected the locations of Sreemangal and Shah Arefin Tila in Sylhet. For the filming, various fast-growing seeds worth ৳1.5−2 lakhs were planted across the filming area of about a mile. About 50 thousand trees were carefully grown for about six months. Not only that, but the house that is central to the story has also been newly constructed for filming. In the words of the director, "So much effort went into making the location not just a use, but a part of the story."

Actress Nazifa Tushi did not use shampoo, soap or any makeup on her hair for six months to portray her character in the film. She bathed only with water. To bring out the reality of the character, she stood in the sun and rubbed mustard oil on his body, causing the skin to burn, causing scars and blemishes to appear. Tushi also changed the color and shape of her teeth to suit the character. To be like the locals, she ate rock lime, which burned her mouth and tongue, making it difficult to speak. She even worked with the workers during the shooting, which helped portray the working-class side of the character's life.

=== Casting ===
Nazifa Tushi, Mostafizur Noor Imran and Ahsabul Yamin Riad were joined from the beginning of filming. Gazi Rakayet, and Tutul Fakir joined to play important roles. In addition, many actors acted for the first time; especially theater artists from Khulna and Jessore also acted in the film.

=== Filming ===
The shooting was supposed to begin in 2022, but it was not possible due to production delays. Principal photography began in 2024 in Bholagonj, Sylhet. One lot of the film's shooting was completed on 18 October 2024. The shooting was completed in late 2024.

== Release ==
=== Marketing ===
The trailer was released on 16 December 2025, coinciding with Independence Day.

=== Theatrical release ===
The film had its world premiere in the Tiger Competition of the 55th International Film Festival Rotterdam on 2 February.

It was released in Bangladeshi theaters on 28 May 2026, coinciding with Eid-al-Adha and clashing with Rockstar, Malik, Masud Rana, Bonolota Sen, Pinik, Tosnos and Officer.

== Reception ==
=== Critical response ===
Latiful Haque of Prothom Alo praised the film and noted "The location of Roid is also strange". Md. Yakub Ali of Jago News 24 praised the film and noted "Tushi is surpassing herself day by day". Naseef Faruque Amin of The Daily Star praised the film and noted "The cinematography, screenplay, story, direction all of all was excellent".

Wahidur Rahman of Bonik Barta praised for its strong performances and aesthetic appeal, the film featured a complex, symbolic storyline that challenged mainstream viewers. Masudur Rahman of The Daily Shomoyer Alo noted "The film received positive response from audience". FI Deepu of Jugantor noted, the film subtly depicts the isolation of rural existence, intricate interpersonal dynamics and quiet emotional struggle.

Faisal Mahmud of Bangla Outlook described the film as an exploration of human desire, obsession and the cyclical nature of longing.

== See also ==
- List of submissions to the 99th Academy Awards for Best International Feature Film
- List of Bangladeshi submissions for the Academy Award for Best International Feature Film
