= The University of Chankharpul =

- Poster
- Directed by: Akash Haque
- Written by: Akash Haque
- Screenplay by: Akash Haque
- Story by: Akash Haque
- Based on: Jhora Patar Dukkho Bilash by Rono Anwar
- Produced by: Akash Haque
- Starring: Devodyuti Aich; Rocky Khan; Boby Biswas; Akhtaruzzaman Azad
- Cinematography: Akash Haque
- Edited by: Akash Haque
- Music by: Sayba Talukder
- Production company: Bee Team
- Distributed by: HM Production Multimedia
- Release date: 12 June 2026
- Country: Bangladesh
- Language: Bengali

The University of Chankharpul is a 2026 Bangladeshi political satire comedy film written, produced, filmed, edited and directed by Akash Haque. The story is inspired by the short story 'Jhara Patar Dukkho Bilash' by writer Rono Anwar. The music is composed by Sayba Talukder. The lead roles are played by Devodyuti Aich, Rocky Khan, Akhtaruzzaman Azad, Boby Biswas, Choyon, Abu Saeed, SA Jibon and Mehede Hasan Sohan.

The film is based on the realistic depiction of the hall culture and student politics of universities in Bangladesh. It was screened at the 2026 Dhaka International Film Festival. The film won the Best Film Award in the Bangladesh Panorama section at the festival. It then won the Hiralal Sen Award for Best Film at the 24th Amar Bhashaar Film Festival organized by the Dhaka University Film Society.

== Plot ==
The story of this film, set in the University of Chankharpul, revolves around a young man from a rural area. His journey begins with a new city, a new environment, and the excitement of university life. Although he is an ordinary student at the beginning, the influence of the hall's older brothers, the power of power, and the excitement of campus politics gradually draw him into student politics.

As he mingles with his friends, he sees that to survive on this campus, one needs not only talent, but also power, identity, and influence. At some point, the dream of becoming a great student leader is born within him. Around that dream, a competition for power begins between a few ambitious young people in the same hall and political circle. Friendship, loyalty, betrayal, and the struggle for dominance gradually complicate their relationship.

The film reveals the real picture of the country's hall-based student politics - bhai culture, flattery, abuse of power, grouping, control politics and its impact on ordinary students. At the same time, it shows how the politics of ideology gradually turns into a game of personal interests and power. This story, set in the unstable reality of university campuses, is on the one hand a story of political ambition, and on the other hand a story of the dreams, crises and search for identity of the youth.

== Cast ==
- Devodyuti Aich
- Rocky Khan
- Akhtaruzzaman Azad
- Boby Biswas
- Choyon
- Abu Saeed
- SA Jibon
- Mehede Hasan Sohan

== Release ==
The film was scheduled to be released in theaters in Bangladesh on 28 May 2026, on the occasion of Eid, but was later postponed to 12 June, in only two multiplexes in the country.

== Awards ==
At the 24th Dhaka International Film Festival, Bangladesh won the Best Feature Film Award in the Panorama category. The international film critics' organization FIPRESCI Jury also awarded it the Best Film Award.
