= Mostafa Monwar =

- মোস্তফা মন্ওয়ার
- Born: Mostafa Monwar Al-Azim
- Education: North South University
- Occupation: Actor
- Years active: 1998–present
- Spouse: Subrina Irine (m. 2018)

"অক্টোবরে আসছে না 'আন্ধার', মুক্তির নতুন তারিখ ঘোষণা". Channel i (in Bengali).

Mostafa Monwar (born Mostafa Monwar Al-Azim) is a Bangladeshi actor known for starring as the protagonist in Live from Dhaka, for which he received 2016 Singapore International Film Festival awards for Best Performance.

== Early life ==
Monwar grew up in Indira Road, Dhaka. In 1998, he joined Prachyanat and acted several street dramas with them. He completed his graduation from North South University. He was also a member of NSU Cine & Drama Club. He studied in Comilla Cadet College between 1991 and 1997.

== Career ==
=== Acting ===
In 2011, Mostofa Monwar made his film debut in Guerrilla. In 2016, he starred as Sazzad in Live from Dhaka. In 2017, he acted in the TV series Chabial Reunion. In 2018, his third film Sincerely Yours, Dhaka was released. In 2019, he starred in the Hoichoi series Dhaka Metro. In 2019, he also acted as Sohel in the film Made in Bangladesh. In 2020, Monwar starred as Selim in another Hoichoi series, Ekattor. In July 2021, he acted as Sabila's husband Arif in ZEE5 series Ladies & Gentleman. In the same month, he appeared as Kabir in Chorki anthology series Unoloukik. In October 2021, he was cast as the ambulance driver in No Ground Beneath the Feet. In December 2021, he portrayed Zahir Raihan in another Chorki series Jaago Bahey, for which he got Channel I Digital Media Award 2021 as the Best Emerging Actor of the year. In March 2022, he starred in the film Gunin.

=== Writing ===
In 2011, Monwar wrote the script of television drama Holud. In 2014, his book Melodrama got published.

== Personal life ==
Monwar married Subrina Erine in 2018.

== Acting credits ==
=== Film ===
Key
†	Denotes films that have not yet been released

Year	Title	Role	Notes	Ref.
2011	Guerrilla	Himself	Uncreated role	
2016	Live from Dhaka	Mohammad Sazzad	Debut film as lead role	
2018	Sincerely Yours, Dhaka	Himself	Segment "Jinnah Is Dead"	
2019	Made in Bangladesh	Sohel		
2021	No Ground Beneath the Feet	Ambulance Driver		
2022	Gunin	Ali		
2023	Surongo	Johir		
2025	Sand City	Hasan	Released on KVIFF	
2025	Saba	Ankur		
2027	Andhar †	Inspector Monwar	Post-production; scheduled for release on 26 March 2027	
TBA	Digante Phooler Agun †	Shahidullah Kaiser	Post-production	

=== Television ===
Year	Title	Role	Director	Notes	Ref.
2017	Chabial Reunion	Dayal	Redoan Rony	episode: "Mr. Jonny"	
2019	Dhaka Metro		Amitabh Reza Chowdhury		
2020	Ekattor	Selim	Tanim Noor		
2021	Ladies & Gentlemen	Arif	Mostofa Sarwar Farooki		
2021	Unoloukik	Kabir	Robiul Alam Robi	episode: "Moribar Holo Taar Shwaad"	
2021	Jaago Bahey	Zahir Raihan	Saleh Sobhan Auneem	episode: "Lights, Camera... Objection"	
2025	Gulmohor	Taimur	Syed Ahmed Shawki		

== Awards ==
Organizations	Year	Category	Work	Result	Ref.
Singapore International Film Festival	2016	Best Performance	Live from Dhaka	Won	
Meril-Prothom Alo Critics Choice Awards	2011	Best Playwright	Holud	Won	
Meril-Prothom Alo Critics Choice Awards	2019	Best Actor	Live from Dhaka	Won	
Channel i Digital Media Awards	2021	Best Rising Star	Jaago Bahey	Won	
