= Jole Jwole Tara =

2024 Bangladeshi Bengali drama film by Arun Chowdhuri

- theatrical release poster
- Bengali: জলে জ্বলে তারা
- Directed by: Arun Chowdhuri
- Screenplay by: Iffat Arefin Mahmood; Anonno Proteek Chowdhuri
- Story by: Iffat Arefin Mahmood
- Starring: Rafiath Rashid Mithila; FS Nayeem; Fazlur Rahman Babu
- Cinematography: Raihan Khan
- Edited by: Raihan Khan
- Music by: E K Majumder Esty
- Production company: Anonno Srishti Productions
- Distributed by: The Abhi Kathachitra
- Release date: 14 February 2025
- Running time: 125 Minutes
- Country: Bangladesh
- Language: Bengali

Jole Jwole Tara (transl. Stars Shine on Water) is a 2025 Bengali-language Bangladeshi romantic drama film. Directed by Arun Chowdhury under the banner of Anonno Srishti Production with government funding, the film is inspired by Syed Waliullah's short story Keraya. Iffat Arefin Mahmud solely wrote the story, co-wrote the screenplay with Arun Chowdhury, and collaborated with Anonno Protikk Chowdhury on the dialogues. The lead roles are played by Rafiath Rashid Mithila, FS Nayeem, and Fazlur Rahman Babu.

With this film, Naeem returns to the big screen after more than 12 years and plays a lead role for the first time. It is also the third film directed by Arun Chowdhury. The soundtrack features songs by Kumar Bishwajit and Imran Mahmudul, while Raihan Khan handled cinematography. The film's first look was revealed on February 1, 2025, and it was released in theaters on February 14, 2025.

== Plot ==
The story of this film is based on social and familial realities. The central character, Tara, grows up facing adversity from childhood. Working in a circus troupe, she loses her entire family in a tragic accident and is forced to live alone by the riverside.

A new ray of hope enters Tara's life in the form of Hossain Majhi, a boatman who makes his living on the river, ferrying locals across. Gradually, a deep bond develops between them. However, their path to love is not easy—societal barriers, financial hardship, and personal struggles continuously make their journey difficult.

The film portrays love, struggle, and social realities, telling a story of finding hope even amid life's harshest truths.

== Cast ==
- Rafiath Rashid Mithila as Tara
- FS Nayeem as Hossain Majhi
- Fazlur Rahman Babu as Tara's father
- Monira Mithu as Tara's mother
- Azad Abul Kalam
- MD Faruk Sobhan
- Mostafizur Noor Imran
- Sadika Maliha Shokh
- MD Iqbal Khandaker
- Shahed Ali

== Production ==
The film received government funding for the fiscal year 2020–21. In October 2021, during the COVID-19 pandemic, filming took place in various locations across Manikganj. Several scenes were also shot along the banks of the Kaliganga River. The entire filming was completed in just three weeks.

== Music ==
The film features two songs. The first song, "Tokei Bhalobashi," was released on February 4, 2025. Written by Prosenjit Mondal and Arun Chowdhury, the song was sung by Imran Mahmudul and Dilshad Nahar Kona, with composition and music arrangement by Imran. The other song was performed by Kumar Bishwajit.

== Release ==
After multiple delays, the film was finally released on February 14, 2025, on Valentine's Day, across 11 theaters in Bangladesh, clashing with the film Moyna, under the distribution of Abhi Kothachitro.

The film received clearance from the Bangladesh Film Censor Board in August 2023. On February 10, 2025, the official trailer was released on Tiger Media's YouTube channel.
