= F. S. Nayeem =

Bangladeshi actor

- এফ এস নাঈম
- Born: Faruk Sobhan; 29 November 1984 (age 41); Dhaka, Bangladesh
- Years active: 2010–present
- Known for: Actor
- Spouse: Nadia Ahmed (m. 2016)

Faruk Sobhan Nayeem (born 29 November 1984), better known by the stage name F. S. Nayeem, is a Bangladeshi television and film actor. He made his film debut in Jaago (2010).

Nayeem gained 35 kg in just 9 months for his role in the web series Kaalpurush (2024), setting an exceptional example among Bangladeshi actors. For this work, he was nominated in the "Best Actor" category of the critics' section of the 26th Meril-Prothom Alo Awards.

== Early life and education ==
Nayeem was born on 29 November 1984 in Dhaka. His father name is Abdul Wadud and mother name is Nasima Wadud. He completed his SSC from Motijheel Government Boys' High School and graduated from American International University, Dhaka. He completed his HSC from the College of Development Alternative.

== Career ==
Nayeem started his career as a video jockey on Channel i in 2004. He started his acting career by acting in small screen dramas in 2006. His first notable drama was Ek Nijhum Aranye (2007) directed by Rumana Rashid Ishita, in which his performance was praised. Gradually, he acted in several popular dramas, telefilms and serials. He made his big screen debut with the film Jaago (2010).

Nayeem made his debut in Ott platform through Hoichoi's web series Mission Huntdown and Karagar, where he captured the attention of the audience by playing the role of a police officer. Later, he earned praise for the role 'Mahbub' in the drama Overtrump released on Chorki.

He also loves singing along with acting. He worked as a vocalist and drummer in the band 'Ironic Faith' in the 1990s. His recent songs 'Tomake' and 'Maya' have been well received in the social media.

== Filmography ==
=== Films ===
Key
†	Denotes films that have not yet been released

Year	Films	Role	Notes	Ref.
2010	Jaago	Joy	Debut film	
2021	Ghola	Shihab	Released on Binge	
2025	Jole Jwole Tara	Hossain		
2025	Taandob	SWAT Chief Commander Bayezid		
2026	Shekor – The Roots			

=== TV/Web series ===
Year	Title	Role	Director	OTT/TV	Ref.
2018	Bachelor Point	Nayeem	Kajal Arefin Ome	Channel 9	
2022	Karagar	Ashfaq Mawla	Syed Ahmed Shawki	Hoichoi	
2023	Mission Huntdown	Mahid	Sunny Sanwar & Faisal Ahmed	Hoichoi	
2023	Overtrump	Mahabub	Bashar Georgis	Chorki	
2024	Kaalpurush	SI Mirajur Rahman	Salzar Rahman	Chorki	
2024	Roilo Baki 10	ASP Azgar	Masud Zakaria Sabin	Tofee	
2024	City Life		Nazrul Islam Raju	Maasranga Television	

== Awards and nominations ==
Year	Award	Category	Work	Result	Ref
2025	Meril-Prothom Alo Awards	Best Actor	Kaalpurush	Nominated	
2026	Meril-Prothom Alo Awards	Best Actor	Khub Kacheri Keu	Won	

== Personal life ==
Nayeem married actress and dancer Nadia Ahmed on January 15, 2016, at Gulshan Club.
