= Shahed Ali (actor) =

Bangladeshi actor

- শাহেদ আলী
- Born: 17 August 1974 (age 51); Ishwar das lane, Banglabazar, Dhaka, Bangladesh
- Notable work: Moner Manush, Udhao, Swapnajaal, Haldaa, Oggatonama, Kaler Putul, Shapludu, Nabab LLB, August 1975, Tungiparar Mia Bhai, Neelchokro
- Spouse: Deepa Khandakar

Shahed Ali is a Bangladeshi actor, works both in films and television. Ali made his acting debut through theatre. His most notable works include Moner Manush, Swapnajaal, Oggatonama, Nabab LLB.

== Works ==
=== Television ===
- Bishaash (2011)
- Pata Jhorar Din (2018)
- Bra-ther (2018)
- Behind The Puppy (2018)
- Viral Girl (2018)
- Majnu (2018)
- Punorjonmo (2018)
- Mayer Daak (2021)
- Shahoshika (2021)
- Punorjonmo 2 (2021)
- Joint Family (2021)

=== Films ===
Year	Title	Role	Director	Notes	Ref.
2010	Moner Manush	Duddu Shah	Goutam Ghose	Indo-Bangladesh joint production	
2013	Udhao	Babu	Amit Ashraf		
2016	Shankhachil		Goutam Ghose	Indo-Bangladesh joint production	
2016	Oggatonama	Rahman	Tauquir Ahmed		
2017	Haldaa	Nibaron	Tauquir Ahmed		
2017	Khacha		Akram Khan		
2018	Pashan		Saikat Nasir		
2018	Chalbaaz		Joydip Mukherjee		
2018	Kaler Putul		Aka Reza Ghalib		
2018	Swapnajaal	Advocate	Giasuddin Selim		
2018	Tui Sudhu Amar		Anonno Mamun		
2018	Orpita		Shahriar Nazim Joy		
2019	Shapludu		Golam Sohrab Dodul		
2020	Nabab LLB	Kirmani	Anonno Mamun		
2021	August 1975	Pranab Chandra Ray	Shamim Ahamed Roni		
2022	Amanush		Anonno Mamun		
2023	Lal Shari	Shamim	Bandhan Biswas		
2025	Jole Jwole Tara		Arun Chowdhuri		
2025	NeelChokro		Mithu Khan		
2025	Fereshteh		Morteza Atashzamzam	Iran-Bangladesh joint production film	

=== Web series ===
- Mohanagar (2021)
- Sadar ghater tiger (2020)
