= Nadia Ahmed =

Bangladeshi actress and dancer

- নাদিয়া আহমেদ
- Born: 31 August 1982 (age 43)
- Occupations: Actress, dancer
- Years active: 1986–present
- Spouses: Monir Khan Shimul (m. 2008–2014) Fs Nayeem (m. 2016)

Nadia Ahmed (born 31 August 1982) is a Bangladeshi television actress and dancer. She made her TV debut in 1986 on the BTV children's program Shishumela. as a dancer.

== Personal life ==
Nadia attended Viqarunnisa Noon School and College. Nadia was married to actor Monir Khan Shimul from 2008 to 2013 November. They stayed separated in between these 5 years many times. And finally, they got divorced in December 2013. On 14 January 2016, she married actor and model, MD Faruk Sobhan (stage name FS Nayeem). Their reception was on 16 January 2016 at Gulshan Club.

== Works ==
- Shishumela (1986), television debut
- Baro Rokomer Manush
- Durer Manush (1999)
- Neel Rong'er Golpo (2013)
- Chaar Kanya (2015)
- Obosheshey Kachhe Eshe (2015)
- Nil Megh Kuasha Ar Bhalobasa (2015)
- Ekti Babui Pakhir Basha (2016)
- Pagla Hawar Din (2016) as Shuvo
- Ora Bokhate (2016)
- Megher Pore Megh Jomeche (2016-2017)
- Ayna Ghor (2016-2017)
- Alpo Salpo Galpo (2017) as Ina
- Brishtider Bari (2017)
- Babui Pakhir Basa (2017)
- Childhood Love (2017)
- Robinhood Ase Nai Tai (2017)
- 200 Kathbeli (2017)
- Blindness (2017)
- Sartho-e Sokol Sukher Mul (2017)
- Tor Kopale Dukhkho Achhe (2017)
- Obosheshe Oboshan (2017)
- Sikriti (2017)
- Tomay Hrid Majhare Rakhbo (2017)
