= Ekattor (TV series) =

2020 Bengali web series

- Title card
- একাত্তর
- Genre: Thriller drama
- Screenplay by: Shibabrata Barman
- Story by: Sarder Saniat Hossain; Shibabrata Barman; Khairul Papon
- Directed by: Tanim Noor
- Starring: See below
- Countries of origin: India; Bangladesh
- Original language: Bengali
- No. of seasons: 1
- No. of episodes: 8

Production
- Executive producers: Shaila Ahmed; Rumel Chowdhury
- Producers: Iresh Zaker; Sarder Saniat Hossain
- Production location: Bangladesh
- Editor: Robin Khan
- Running time: 20-22 Minutes
- Production company: Dope Productions

Original release
- Release: 26 March 2020

Ekattor is a Bengali-language streaming television series directed by Tanim Noor. It was released on OTT platform hoichoi on 26 March 2020, Independence Day of Bangladesh. The series stars Mostofa Monowar, Nusrat Imrose Tisha, Iresh Zaker, Rafiath Rashid Mithila, Mostafizur Noor Imran in the lead roles, along with Tariq Anam Khan, Shatabdi Wadud and Deepanwita Martin in significant roles.

== Cast ==
- Mostafa Monowar as Selim:

A gang leader of old Dhaka who owns a garage and loves Joyita.

- Nusrat Imrose Tisha as Joyita:

A university student & activist.

- Iresh Zaker as Major Wasim:

A well-known Pakistan Army officer in-charge of Operation Blitz at Dacca.

- Rafiath Rashid Mithila as Ruhi:

A West-Pakistani journalist and wife of Major Wasim, a Bengali Pakistan Army officer who steals a top secret file.

- Tariq Anam Khan as Gul Mohammad:

A Pakistan Army officer of Dacca.

- Shatabdi Wadud as Prodip:

A top Awami League leader.

- Deepanwita Martin

== Series overview ==
Series	Episodes	Originally released
1	8	26 March 2020

=== Season 1 (2019) ===
The story is based on Operation Blitz in 1971 in East Pakistan presently known as Bangladesh. Captain Shiraj who is a protagonist played by Mostafizur, tries to collect the file of Operation Blitz. He wants to hand over the file to the international mass media before the disaster happens. While being chased by Pakistani troops he takes shelter in Salim's garage. He intends to seek help from others to build up a resistance against the army. The unexpected attack of Salim leaves the army baffled.

No.	Title	Directed by	Original release date
1	"Shaape Neule" "At Daggers Drawn"	Tanim Noor	26 March 2020
2	"Shokuner Agomon" "Arrival of the vulture"	Tanim Noor	26 March 2020
3	"Ghar Shotru Bibhishon" "The house is the enemy"	Tanim Noor	26 March 2020
4	"Bagher Ghore Ghoger Basha" "Lion's nest in a tiger's room"	Tanim Noor	26 March 2020
5	"Khudhartho Hyena" "The hungry hyena"	Tanim Noor	26 March 2020
6	"Phnaad" "The trap"	Tanim Noor	26 March 2020
7	"Palta Aghat" "Hit the counter"	Tanim Noor	26 March 2020
8	"Kalbela"	Tanim Noor	26 March 2020
