= Unoloukik =

Bangladeshi anthology television series

- Bengali: ঊনলৌকিক
- Genre: Anthology; Psychological thriller; Psychological drama
- Developed by: Robiul Alam Robi
- Screenplay by: Shibabrata Barman; Robiul Alam Robi; Syed Ahmed Shawki; Neamoth Ullah Masum; Naseef Amin
- Story by: Shibabrata Barman
- Directed by: Robiul Alam Robi
- Starring: Gazi Rakayet; Asaduzzaman Noor; Chanchal Chowdhury; Nusrat Imrose Tisha; Iresh Zaker; Rafiath Rashid Mithila; Intekhab Dinar
- Composer: Rasheed Sharif Shoaib
- Country of origin: Bangladesh
- Original language: Bengali
- No. of seasons: 1
- No. of episodes: 5

Production
- Executive producers: Mir Mukarram Hossain; Tanim Noor; Rumel Chowdhury
- Producer: Saleh Sobhan Auneem
- Cinematography: Tanveer Ahmed Shovon; Barkat Hossain Polash; Kamrul Hasan Khosru; Sumon Sarker; Ishtiaque Hossain Pablo
- Editors: Sazal Alok; Saleh Sobhan Auneem
- Running time: 20–30 minutes
- Production companies: Film Syndicate; Film Noir

Original release
- Network: Chorki
- Release: 12 July – 12 August 2021

Unoloukik (Bengali: ঊনলৌকিক) is a Bangladeshi anthology streaming television series written by Shibabrata Barman and directed by Robiul Alam Robi. Individual episodes explore the psychoanalytic journey of the human mind. There are five episodes in this series. The first episode, Moribar Holo Taar Shwaad, premiered on 12 July 2021, and the last episode, Dwikhondito, on 12 August 2021 on OTT platform Chorki.

The series has adopted four stories by Shibabrata Barman - Moribar Holo Tar Shwaad, Dwikhondito, Jagar Bela Holo (adapted to Mrs. Prohelika), and Television (adapted to Hello Ladies). And he wrote the fifth story Don't Write Me especially for this series.

Unoloukik has been produced under the banner of Film Noir and Film Syndicate. Saleh Sobhan Auneem served as the producer and Mir Mukarram Hossain, Tanim Noor, Rumel Chowdhury were the executive producers.

The screenwriting team consists of Neamoth Ullah Masum, Syed Ahmed Shawki, and Naseef Amin along with Shibabrata Barman and Robiul Alam Robi.

Five cinematographers worked on the five episodes of Unoloukik, which is a rare feat in the Bangladeshi entertainment industry. They are - Kamrul Hasan Khosru, Tanveer Ahmed Shovon, Sumon Sarker, Ishtiaque Hossain, and Barkat Hossain Polash.

The cast includes Asaduzzaman Noor, Gazi Rakayet, Chanchal Chowdhury, Nusrat Imrose Tisha, Rafiath Rashid Mithila, Iresh Zaker, Intekhab Dinar, Mostafa Monwar, Sumon Anwar, Naziba Basher, Shohel Mondol, Farhana Hamid, and Sahana Rahman Sumi.

== Premise ==
=== Genre and themes ===
As Unoloukik is an anthology series, each episode is standalone and can be watched in any order. The program is an instance of Psychological fiction within thriller and drama. The majority of the episodes revolve around the maze of illusion and truth. Each of the stories has its dark materials present time and space paradoxes and questions pertaining to existence. There are historical testaments, psychological bewilderments, and an overall curious expedition of what might have been true if only a combination was altered.

== Cast ==
=== Episode 1 ===
- Gazi Rakayet as Psychiatrist
- Mostafa Monwar as Kabir
- Naziba Basher as Nawshin
- Sumon Anowar as Chef

=== Episode 2 ===
- Asaduzzaman Noor as Farhad Mahmood
- Shohel Mondol as Amir Hossain
- Farhana Hamid as Rokeya

=== Episode 3 ===
- Nusrat Imrose Tisha as Humaira
- Chanchal Chowdhury as Psychologist

=== Episode 4 ===
- Rafiath Rashid Mithila as Sicily
- Iresh Zaker as Ashraf
- Sahana Rahman Sumi

=== Episode 5 ===
- Intekhab Dinar as Mostaq Ahmed

== Episodes ==
No.	Episode	Directed by	Written by	Original release date
1	"Moribar Holo Taar Shwaad"	Robiul Alam Robi	Robiul Alam Robi; Syed Ahmed Shawki	12 July 2021
Kabir wants to die. He has a suicidal tendency. He tried so many ways to killed himself, but failed. He regularly visit to a psychiatrist who is trying help him to combat with his psychological disorder. Cast: Mostafa Monwar, Gazi Rakayet, Sumon Anowar, Naziba Basher
2	"Don't Write Me"	Robiul Alam Robi	Neamoth Ullah Masum; Shibabrata Barman; Robiul Alam Robi	15 July 2021
Amir Hossain worked in a printing press shop. One day he gets a book named 'Amirer Dinratri' to make a copy of it. By seeing his name on the book, he got interested in it and started reading it. By reading this, he discovered this story is his own life story. He became curious and went to meet with the writer. Cast: Shohel Mondol, Asaduzzaman Noor, Farhana Hamid
3	"Mrs. Prohelika"	Robiul Alam Robi	Robiul Alam Robi; Neamoth Ullah Masum; Naseef Amin	29 July 2021
Humaira came to a psychologist to get treatment. She couldn't dream and was suffering from a sleeping disorder for more than two years. The psychologist advised her to visit a neurologist rather than a psychologist. Cast: Nusrat Imrose Tisha, Chanchal Chowdhury
4	"Hello Ladies"	Robiul Alam Robi	Neamoth Ullah Masum; Shibabrata Barman; Robiul Alam Robi	5 August 2021
A television show called Hello Ladies is very popular among the housewives. On the shooting set of the show, the host of the felt like she could see the drawing room of her audiences through the camera lens. Cast: Rafiath Rashid Mithila, Iresh Zaker, Sahana Rahman Sumi
5	"Dwikhondito"	Robiul Alam Robi	Shibabrata Barman; Neamoth Ullah Masum; Robiul Alam Robi	12 August 2021
Mostaq Ahmed works in a government office as a clerk. He went to Mohammadpur police station and discuss some stories with the on duty sub-inspector. And finally, reveal he is facing a death threat from an anonymous person and want to file a general dairy (GD). Cast: Intekhab Dinar

== Release ==
On 26 June 2021, Chorki released the poster of Unoloukik on social media. And on 10 July 2021, they released the trailer on YouTube. Unoloukik premiered on 12 July 2021, with an episode release. One episode would be released every week for the remainder of the 5-episode first season. The last episode Dwikhondito aired on 12 August 2021.
