= Tanim Noor =

Bangladeshi director and playwright

- তানিম নূর
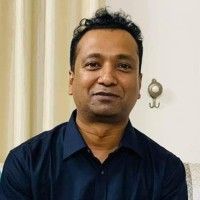
- Noor in 2026
- Born: Abdullah Al Noor; Shyamoli, Dhaka, Bangladesh
- Citizenship: Bangladeshi
- Occupations: filmmaker; screenwriter; producer
- Years active: 2009–present
- Organizations: Dope Productions; Buriganga Talkies

Abdullah Al Noor, professionally known as Tanim Noor, is a Bangladeshi filmmaker, screenwriter and producer who works predominantly in Dhallywood cinema and Bangladeshi television drama. He made his directional debut with the psychological thriller film Phirey Esho Behula (2011).

== Early life ==
Tanim Noor was born in Shyamoli, Dhaka, Bangladesh. At the first of his education at Dhaka Residential Model College. Then he completed his early education in Dhaka College and graduated from the University of Dhaka.

== Career ==
=== 2009–2018: Early career and film debut ===
Tanim Noor started his career in the country's visual media and entertainment industry in 2009 as an assistant. In 2011, he founded 'Dope Productions' to produce commercial and advertisement films jointly with director Krishnendu Chattopadhyay. His first psychological thriller film Phirey Esho Behula was released on 20 January 2011. The film starred Jaya Ahsan, Tauquir Ahmed, Humayun Faridi, Shatabdi Wadud, Jayanta Chattopadhyay, Intekhab Dinar and Raisul Islam Asad. In 2017, he produced several acclaimed short films under Film Noir's YouTube-based short film platform 'Projonmo Talkies'. In 2018, he directed a segment of Bangladesh's first OTT genre anthology film Iti, Tomarai Dhaka, which was made in collaboration with 11 young directors.

=== 2019–2024: Success through OTT and Film Syndicate ===
He began his OTT journey in 2019 by directing the crime thriller series Money Honey, based on a true story, on the streaming platform Hoichoi. In 2020, he directed the historical thriller series Ekattor, set against the backdrop of the Bangladesh Liberation War, for the video streaming platform Bioscope. In the same year, he worked as a creative producer on the streaming platform Hoichoi's highly acclaimed series Taqdeer.

He gained wide recognition in 2021 by directing the ZEE5 original series Contact (jointly with Krishnendu Chattopadhyay), based on Mohammad Nazim Uddin's novel. In 2022, his solo directorial detective series Kaiser starring Afran Nisho was released on Hoichoi, which received a huge response in both Bangladesh and India (Kolkata). During this time, he jointly formed a production company called 'Film Syndicate' with Mir Mokarram Hossain, Syed Ahmed Shawki and Krishnendu Chattopadhyay. Later, he was also involved as an executive producer in the television series Karagar (2022) and Kaalpurush (2024).

=== 2025–present: Return to mainstream cinema and commercial records ===
His third directional film, titled Utshob (2025), which was widely appreciated by the audience and set a unique precedent by earning around ৳13 crores worldwide. He also served as the script director for the film Chokkor 302 (2025). After success of Utshob, Noor announced his feature film Bonolota Express, which was released on Eid-ul-Fitr 2026. The film emerged as a major commercial success, grossing approximately ৳20 crores worldwide. It set a new milestone in the Bangladeshi film industry by demonstrating that a Bangladeshi film could achieve significant commercial success without relying on a major or widely recognized star cast. The film is also credited with contributing to a shift in public perception toward Bangladeshi cinema.

== Filmography ==
Key
†	Denotes films that have not yet been released

=== Feature film ===
Year	Title	Director	Screenplay	Producer	Notes	Ref.
2011	Phirey Esho Behula	Yes	Yes	No	Directional debut film	
2018	Iti, Tomari Dhaka	Yes	No	No	Jointly directed with more ten directors	
2025	Utshob	Yes	Yes	Yes		
2026	Bonolota Express	Yes	No	Yes	Based on Humayun Ahmed's novel 'Kichukkhon'	
2027	Kanabhula Paradox †	No	No	Yes	Based on Mohaiminul Islam Bappi's novel 'Kanabhula Paradox'	
2027	Mojnu Enterprise †	Yes			Filming	

=== Web series ===
Year	Title	Director	Screenplay	Producer	Notes
2019	Money Honey	Yes	No	Yes	Jointly directed with Krishnendu Chattopadhyay; released in Hoichoi
2020	Ekattor	Yes	No	No	Released in Bioscope
2020	Taqdeer	No	No	Creative	Released in Hoichoi
2021	Contact	Yes	Yes	No	Jointly directed with Krishnendu Chattopadhyay; released in ZEE5
2021	Unoloukik	No	No	Executive	Released on Chorki
2022	Karagar	No	No	Executive	Released in Hoichoi
2022	Kaiser	Yes	Yes	No	Released in Hoichoi
2024	Kaalpurush	No	No	Executive	Released in Chorki
2025	Gulmohor	No	No	Executive	Released in Chorki

== Awards ==
Year	Award	Category	Work	Result	Ref.
2023	Blender's Choice-The Daily Star OTT & Digital Content Awards	Best Director (Series)	Kaiser	Nominated	
2026	Dhallywood Film and Music Awards	Best Film Director (critics' choice)	Utshob	Won	
2026	Dhallywood Film and Music Awards	Best Producer	Utshob	Won	
2026	Meril-Prothom Alo Awards	Best Producer	Utshob	Won	
