= Intekhab Dinar =

Bangladeshi television and film actor

- ইন্তেখাব দিনার
- Occupation: Actor
- Years active: 1995–present
- Notable work: Bondhone; Unoloukik; Karagar
- Spouse: Bijori Barkatullah (m. 2013)

Intekhab Dinar (Bengali: ইন্তেখাব দিনার, Bengali pronunciation: [intekʰab dinar]) is a popular Bangladeshi actor known for starring in the Ekushey Television tv series Bondhone and Chorki series Unoloukik.

== Early life ==
The paternal grandfather of Dinar owned Purabi, a movie theater in Mymensingh.

== Career ==
In 1995, Dinar joined the theater troupe "Nagorik Natya Somproday". He acted in several plays including: Nurul Diner Sharajibon, Ocholayoton", "Mrityu Sangbad, Galileo", "Dewan Gazir Kissa and Shankha Chil.

Dinar made his debut in television drama by his performing in Gor, written by Gazi Rakayet and directed by Salauddin Lavlu in 1997. Dinar acted in the drama because Rakayet inspired him to do that. Then Dinar became popular by performing in TV series Bondhone.

He also acted in films including Joyjatra and Phirey Esho Behula. Joyjatra, the 2004 Bangladeshi film, was his debut film.

After the 2010s, Intekhab Dinar became frustrated as his work declined. Then he decided to retire from acting in consultation with his family. Thus at one time he became a stranger among the new generations. In 2020, Dinar entered the world of web series by acting in Taqdeer. Then in 2021, his career resurrected by his performance in an episode of Unoloukik. Since the 2020s, he has been busy mainly acting in web series. He is now known as "web artist".

== Personal life ==
Dinar married actress Bijori Barkatullah in 2013. The couple live in their residence of Uttara, Dhaka.

== Filmography ==
=== Feature films ===
Key
†	Denotes films that have not yet been released

Year	Film	Role	Notes	Ref.
2004	Joyjatra	Johnson	Debut film	
2011	Khondo Golpo 1971	Tara Mia		
2011	Phirey Esho Behula			
2014	Brihonnola	Tulsi		
2018	Sincerely Yours, Dhaka			
2019	Shonibar Bikel	Chisti	Banned in Bangladesh	
2019	Shapludu			
2021	Khachar Bhitor Ochin Pakhi	Sagor	Released in Chorki	
2022	Birotto	Musa Chowdhury		
2022	Damal	Manager		
2023	Ora 7 Jon	Doctor Saab		
2023	Ekhane Nongor		Web film on Rtv Plus	
2023	Puff Daddy		Web film on Bongo BD	
2024	Shyama Kabya	Osman		
2025	Silence: A Musical Journey	Disco Dinar "DD"		
2026	Bonolota Express	Boro Chacha		
2026	Prince: Once Upon a Time in Dhaka	Minhaz		
2026	Khalnayak †	TBA	Filming	

=== Television dramas ===
Title	Playwright & Director	Notes & Source
Abong Bibaho	Shahadat Hussain	
Shondehatito Dushto Golpo		
Biye Boomerang		
Shomporker Shironamti Bhabte Hobe		
Megher Vaje Rod		
Akash Vora Josna Dhar		
Tomar Sombhabona Amar Somvob Na		
A Pashe Bondho Janala		
19 Bosor Por		
Uttoradhikari		
Next Door		
Surjo Tara		
Megh Bristee O Tarpor		
Bibaho Hobe	Rawnak Hasan	

=== Web series ===
Year	Title	OTT	Character	Director	Notes
2020	Taqdeer	Hoichoi	Saymon Chairman	Syed Ahmed Shawki	Special Appearances
2021	Bilaap	cinematic		Sunny Sanwar and Faisal Ahmed	a cinematic web series
2021	Unoloukik	Chorki	Mostaq Ahmed	Robiul Alam Robi	Episode 5 (Dwikhondito)
2021	Jaago Bahey	Chorki	Maj. Gen. Rao Farman Ali	Saleh Sobhan Auneem	Episode 2 (Lights, Camera... Objection)
2022	Nikhoj	Chorki	Hamidur Rahman	Reehan Rahman	
2022	Sabrina	Hoichoi		Ashfaque Nipun	
2022	Dour	Hoichoi		Rayhan Khan	
2022	Karagar	Hoichoi	Mostak Ahmed	Syed Ahmed Shawki	
2022	Makal	Bioscope		Animesh Aich	
2025	Black Money	Bongo BD	Baitta Masum	Raihan Rafi	
2025	Gulmohor	Chorki	Rashed Talukder	Syed Ahmed Shawki	
2025–2026	Eta Amaderi Golpo	Channel i	Rafiq	Mohammad Mostafa Kamal Raz	
2026	Headline	Hoichoi		Saleh Sobhan Auneem	

=== Web films ===
Year	Title	Role	Platform	Ref
2022	Cafe Desire		Chorki	
2023	Unish20	Rashed	Chorki	
2026	Tomader Golpo 2		Channel i	

== Awards and nominations ==
Year	Awards	Category	Work	Result
2022	Channel i Digital Media Awards	Best Male actor (web series)	Unoloukik	Won
2022	Blender's Choice-The Daily Star OTT Awards	Best Supporting Actor (series)	Karagar	Won
