= The Business Standard =

Bangladeshi English-language periodical newspaper

- Type: Daily newspaper
- Format: Broadsheet, online
- Owner(s): The Horizon Media and Publication Ltd., Orion Group (Bangladesh).
- Editor: Inam Ahmed
- Founded: 21 January 2020
- Language: English; Bengali (Online)
- Website: www.tbsnews.net www.tbsnews.net/bangla/
- Free online archives: www.tbsnews.net/archive

The Business Standard (Bengali: দ্য বিজনেস স্ট্যান্ডার্ড) is a Bangladeshi daily newspaper published in English and Bengali. The newspaper was founded by The Horizon Media and Publication Ltd and is based in Dhaka, the capital of Bangladesh. The newspaper provides detailed analysis of the economic and financial affairs of Bangladesh. The Business Standard also provides selective analysis from various publications including Agence France-Presse, Bloomberg, Reuters, Project Syndicate and Hindustan Times.

== History ==
The Business Standard an English newspaper, was established on 21 January 2020. Before that, its online version was established in 2019.

Academics Abdul Kabil Khan and Anna Shnaider wrote about The Business Standard's emphasis on infographics to attract and retain readers and help them quickly understand complicated topics. They also described the newspaper's effective use of what in 2021 was a relatively new story format for Bangladesh: team produced, long-form pieces incorporating multimedia elements such as infographics and photos.
