= Iresh Zaker =

Bangladeshi advertising executive, actor, and singer (born 1976)

- ইরেশ যাকের
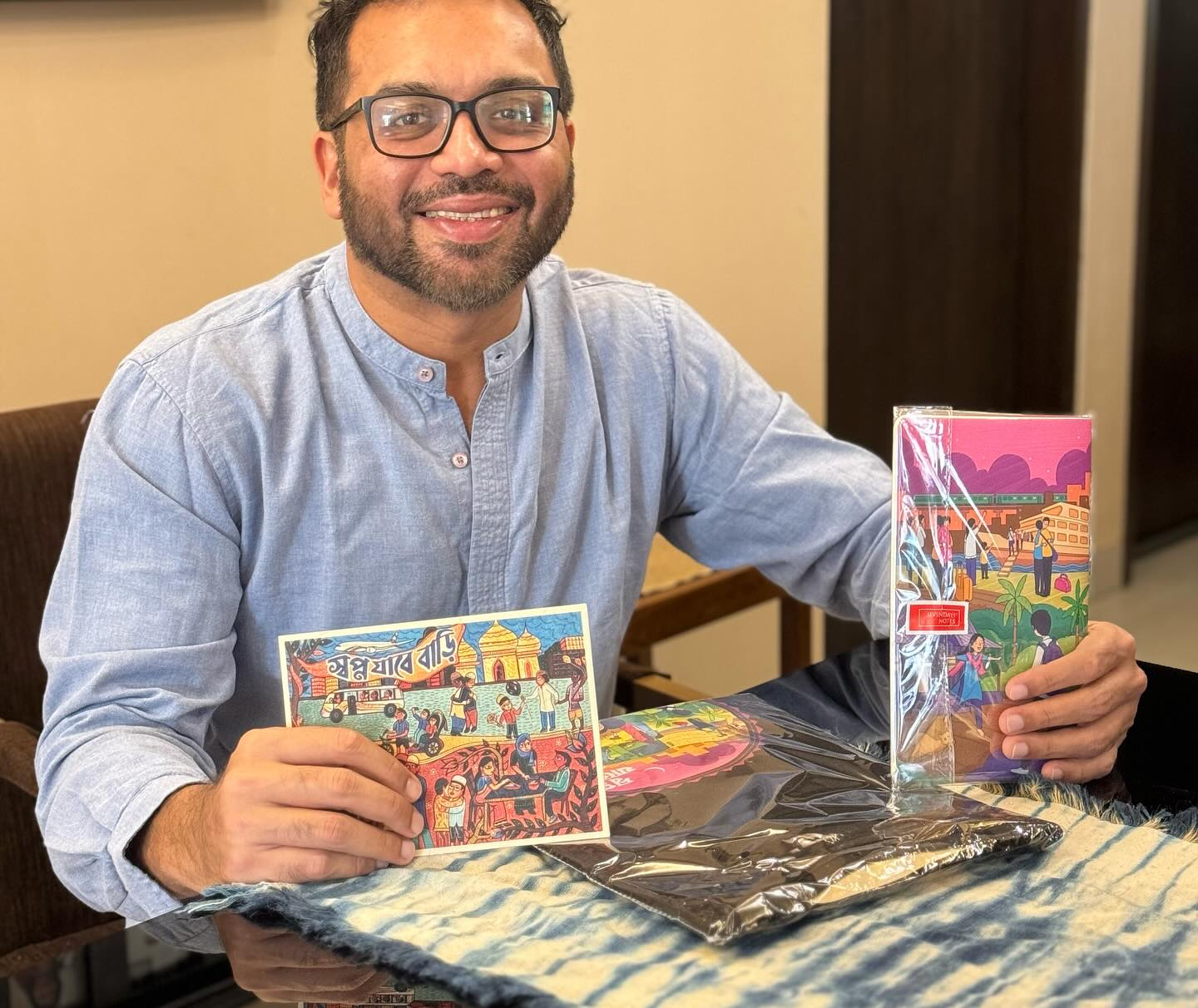
- Zaker in 2024
- Born: 6 November 1976 (age 49); Dhaka, Bangladesh
- Education: University of Illinois at Urbana–Champaign
- Occupations: Actor; advertising executive; singer
- Years active: 2006–present
- Spouse: Zakia Rashid (m. 2018)
- Parents: Aly Zaker (father); Sara Zaker (mother)
- Website: https://ireshzaker.com/

Iresh Zaker (born 6 November 1976) is a Bangladeshi advertising executive, television and film actor, and singer. He is the managing director of Asiatic 360, a marketing and advertising company owned and operated by his parents, actors Aly Zaker and Sara Zaker. Most of Iresh Zaker's work as an actor has been in television, but he has also played negative roles in several films. He won the National Film Awards Best Performance in a Negative Role in 2015 for his portrayal of antagonist Danny in Chuye Dile Mon.

== Early life and education ==
Zaker was born on 6 November 1976 to actors Aly Zaker and Sara Zaker. He spent his early childhood with his younger sister, Sriya Sharbojoya, in Bangladesh. He completed his initial schooling at Scholastica in Dhaka in 1994. After that, he went to the United States and enrolled at Grinnell College, in Iowa. Then he moved to Wisconsin and graduated from Lawrence University in 2000. Two years later he finished his master's degree in development economics from the University of Illinois at Urbana–Champaign.

After completion of his graduation, he got a job in the United States and planned his future there. After some years, however, he returned to Bangladesh.

== Career ==
In his education life, he and some of his friends formed the musical group Cryptic Fate, which became popular, but he later left the band.

At first he worked as a voice artist, doing radio dramas, documentaries, and commercials. He did a voice-over for Sisimpur, the popular Bangladeshi version of the children's television series Sesame Street.

He debuted as a television actor in 2006 as Shahed in the single-episode TV play Batasher Khacha, with his father, Aly Zaker, playing his on-screen father. In 2012, he debuted on the big screen in the film Chorabali, directed by Redoan Rony. He won the 2015 National Film Awards Best Performance in a Negative Role for his portrayal of antagonist Danny in Chuye Dile Mon, produced by his mother, Sara Zaker.

As well as his TV and film work, Zaker is group managing director of Asiatic 360 (his family's marketing and communication company) and a director of Radio Shadhin, one of the Asiatic Group companies.

== Filmography ==
=== Films ===
Year	Title	Role	Notes
2012	Chorabali		
2015	Zero Degree		
2015	Chuye Dile Mon		
2018	Swapnajaal		
2018	Debi		
2020	Mission Extreme		
2022	Gunin		
2022	Mukhosh		
2024	Kajolrekha		
2024	Nakshi Kanthar Jamin		
2025	A House Named Shahana	Shukhomoy Haldar	
TBA	Pulsirat		Filming

=== Television ===
Year	Title	Notes
2006	Batasher Khacha	
2007	Ujan Pother Jatri	
2008-2009	Hetmundu Urdhapad	
2009	Eid Vacation	
2009	Babar Hotel	
2010	Anchor Mofiz	
2010	Manpower	
2010	Opekkha	
2012	The Fortune	
2012	Amader Golpo	
2012	Chhobir Haat	
2013	Kajoler Dinratri	
2013	@18	
2013	Ekti Oporadh Bishoyok Kolpona	
2013	Chili Chocolate	
2014	Durotto	
2014	Alpana Kajol	
2015	Monkey Bizness	
2015	Proyo Podrekha	
2015	Proshno	
2015	Osthir Parvez	
2015	Amar Naam Ke Rakhchhe	
2015	Sikander Box Ekhon Nij Grame	
2015	Prem Othoba Duhshopner Raat Din	
2015	Aguner Phul	
2016	Girlfriend	
2016	X Factor	
2016	Talk-Show Master	
2016	Oshompurno	
2016	Tumi Na Thakle	
2017	Punch Clip	
2018	Nongor Feli Ghate Ghate	

=== Web series ===
Year	Title	Character	Director	OTT	Notes
2020	Ekattor	Major Wasim	Tanim Noor	Hoichoi	
2021	Contract		Tanim Noor and Krishnendu Chattopadhyay	ZEE5	
2021	Ladies & Gentlemen	DB Officer	Mostofa Sarwar Farooki	ZEE5	
2021	Unoloukik	Ashraf	Robiul Alam Robi	Chorki	
2021	Boli	Joynal	Shankha Dasgupta	Hoichoi	
2022	Bite Size Halloween Season 3		Nuhash Humayun	Hulu	

== Awards ==
- 2015 National Film Awards Bangladesh National Film Award for Best Performance in a Negative Role for Chuye Dile Mon
