= Impress Telefilm =

Bangladeshi largest production house

- Type: Private
- Industry: Media and entertainment
- Founded: 1996
- Founder: Faridur Reza Sagar
- Headquarters: Bangladesh

Impress Telefilm Limited is a media production house in Bangladesh, formed in 1996. The company produces film, drama, and drama serials, music videos, variety shows, magazine programmes, musical programmes, and documentaries as well as TV commercials. It was founded by Faridur Reza Sagar.

From Bangladesh, 9 different films of Impress Telefilm has got Bangladeshi submissions for the Oscar for Foreign Language Film Competition 9 times.

== All films and telefilms ==
List of the films distributed and produced by Impress Telefilm

Feature Films Produced by Impress Telefilm
Year	Title	Director	Artists	Ref.
2000	Kittonkhola	Abu Sayeed	Raisul Islam Asad, Mamunur Rashid, Pijush Bandopadhyay, Jayanta Chattopadhyay, Nayla Azad Nupur, Tamalika Karmakar, Azad Abul Kalam	
2003	Kokhono Megh Kokhono Brishti	Moushumi	Moushumi, Ferdous, Razzak, Bobita, Humayun Faridi, Shahidul Alam Sachchu	
2004	Bachelor	Mostofa Sarwar Farooki	Humayun Faridi, Ferdous Ahmed, Shabnur, Ahmed Rubel, Aupee Karim, Hasan Masood, Marzuk Rasel	
2004	Megher Pore Megh	Chashi Nazrul Islam	Riaz, Purnima, Mahfuz Ahmed	
2004	Ek Khondo Jomi	Shahjahan Chowdhury	Raisul Islam Asad, Champa, Anwar Hossain	
2004	Durotto	Morshedul Islam	Suborna Mustafa, Humayun Faridi, Raisul Islam Asad, Hakim Ferdous, Aktar Hossain, Delwar Hossain, Wahida Mollick Jolly, Shahidul Alam Sachchu	
2004	Shyamol Chhaya	Humayun Ahmed	Humayun Faridi, Riaz, Shaon Ahmed, Tania Ahmed, Shadhin Khosru, Ahmed Rubel	
2004	Joyjatra	Tauquir Ahmed	Bipasha Hayat, Azizul Hakim, Mahfuz Ahmed, Abul Hayat, Humayun Faridi, Tariq Anam Khan	
	Ghor Jamai	Shah Alam Kiran	Shabnur, Ferdous Ahmed, Prabir Mitra, Shahidul Alam Sachchu, Nasrin, Harun Kisinger	
2004	Wrong Number	Matin Rahman	Riaz, Srabanti, Abdul Kader, Dolly Zahur, Amol Bose	
2004	Shasti	Chashi Nazrul Islam	Riaz, Purnima, Ilias Kanchan, Champa	
2004	Kal Sokale	Amjad Hossain	Shabnur, Ferdous Ahmed, Apu Biswas, Diti, Challenger	
2005	Lal Sobuj	Shahidul Islam Khokon	Mahfuz Ahmed, Shimla, Salauddin Lavlu, Selim Haider, Tusti, Prabir Mitra, Khaleda Aktar Kolpona, Siraj Haider, Challenger	
	Ajker Rupban	Chotku Ahmed and Akhond Sarwar Morshed	Keya, Nazu, Dulari, Amir Siraji, Taimur, Omar Sani, Manju	
2006	Shuva	Chashi Nazrul Islam	Shakib Khan, Purnima, Chashi Nazrul Islam, Sujata	
2005	Meher Nigar	Moushumi and Mushfiqur Rahman Gulzar	Moushumi, Ferdous Ahmed, Prabir Mitra, Erin Zaman, Nader Chowdhury, Shahidul Alam Sachchu	
2006	Ayna	Kabori Sarwar	Ferdous, Sohana Saba, Joyraj, Kabori Sarwar, Subhash Dutta, Rani Sarker, ATM Shamsuzzaman, Prabir Mitra	
	Jiboner Golpo	Gazi Mazharul Anwar	Kabori Sarwar, Alamgir, Manna, Moushumi, Shabnur, Joy	
2006	Dhrubotara	Chashi Nazrul Islam	Ferdous, Moushumi, Helal Khan, Shamima Nazneen, Subrata	
2006	Rakkhoshi	Matin Rahman	Rozina, Ferdous, Purnima	
2006	Bangla	Shahidul Islam Khokon	Shabnur, Mahfuz Ahmed, Humayun Faridi	
2006	Forever Flows	Abu Sayeed	Shabnur, Ilias Kanchan, Dolly Zahur, Amirul Haq Chowdhury	
2006	Kabuliwala	Kazi Hayat	Manna, Dighi, Subrata, Doyel	
	O Amar Chele	Subhash Dutta	Popy, Apu Biswas	
2006	Bokul Phuler Mala	Delwar Jahan Jhantu	Riaz, Tanzika Amin	
2006	Rupkothar Golpo	Tauquir Ahmed	Chanchal Chowdhury, Taskin Sumi, Tauquir Ahmed	
2006	Bindur Chele	Mushfiqur Rahman Gulzar	Moushumi, Ferdous, Diti, Humayun Faridi	
2007	Made in Bangladesh	Mostofa Sarwar Farooki	Zahid Hasan, Shahiduzzaman Selim, Tariq Anam Khan, Masud Ali Khan, Fazlur Rahman Babu, Shahidul Alam Sachchu, Tania Ahmed, Srabosti Dutta Tinni, Marzuk Rasel	
2007	Bristi Bheja Akash	Sohanur Rahman Sohan	Moushumi, Ferdous, Shakil Khan	
2006	Ghani	Kazi Morshed	Raisul Islam Asad, Dolly Zahur, Arman Parvez Murad, Naznin Hasan Chumki, Masum Aziz	
2007	Swopnodanay	Golam Rabbani Biplob	Mahmuduzzaman Babu, Rokeya Prachy, Fazlur Rahman Babu	
2007	Shajghor	Shah Alam Kiran	Manna, Moushumi, Dighi, Nipun	
	Gram Gonjer Piriti	Azadi Hasnat Firoz	Shabnur, Joy, ATM Shamsuzzaman, Amol Bose	
2007	Ekjon Shonge Chilo	Shawkat Jamil	Moushumi, Riaz, Mounata, Asif Iqbal, Siraj Haider, Abu Sayeed Khan, Kazi Hayat	
2007	Noy Number Bipod Sanket	Humayun Ahmed	Rahmat Ali, Challenger, Diti, Jayanta Chattopadhyay, Tania Ahmed, Shadhin Khosru, Rupok, Ishrat Jahan Chaity	
2007	Aha!	Enamul Karim Nirjhar	Ferdous, Yasmin Bilkis Sathi, Tariq Anam Khan, Humayun Faridi, Fazlur Rahman Babu, Khaled Khan	
	Ei Je Duniya!	Gazi Mazharul Anwar	Razzak, Manna, Moushumi, Shabnur, Joy	
2007	Daruchini Dwip	Tauquir Ahmed	Riaz, Momo, Mosharraf Karim, Emon, Bindu, Munmun, Abul Hayat, Afroza Banu	
	Swapnopuron	Shahidul Islam Khokon	Ferdous, Moushumi, Shams Sumon, Sohel Rana	
	Hridoy Theke Pawa	Mohammad Hossain Jemi	Manna, Moushumi, Champa, Misha Sawdagor	
2008	Amar Ache Jol	Humayun Ahmed	Zahid Hasan, Ferdous Ahmed, Shaon, Bidya Sinha Saha Mim	
2008	Pashaner Prem	Gazi Mazharul Anwar	Moushumi, Amit Hasan, Apu Biswas, Adnan, Joy, Misha Sawdagor	
2009	Gangajatra	Syed Wahiduzzaman Diamond	Ferdous Ahmed, Popy	
2009	Britter Baire	Golam Rabbani Biplob	Jayanta Chattopadhyay, Feroz Khan Dollar, Fazlur Rahman Babu, Shahidul Alam Sachchu	
2009	Third Person Singular Number	Mostofa Sarwar Farooki	Nusrat Imroz Tisha, Mosharraf Karim, Rashed Uddin Ahmed Topu, Abul Hayat	
2010	Gohine Shobdo	Khalid Mahmood Mithu	Emon, Kusum Sikder, Abul Hayat, Masum Aziz, Shams Sumon	
2010	Nijhum Aronye	Mushfiqur Rahman Gulzar	Shajal, Badhon, Ilias Kanchan, Champa, Abul Hayat,	
2010	Obujh Bou	Nargis Akter	Priyanka, Bobita, Ferdous, Shakil Khan, Nipun Akter, Wahida Mollick Jolly, Amol Bose	
2010	Dubshatar	Nurul Alam Atique	Jaya Ahsan, Ashok Bepari, Shahriar Shuvo, Wahida Mollick Jolly, Srabosti Dutta Tinni	
2010	Moner Manush	Goutam Ghose	Prosenjit Chatterjee, Paoli Dam, Chanchal Chowdhury, Raisul Islam Asad, Champa, Rokeya Prachy, Priyanshu Chatterjee	
2011	Amar Bondhu Rashed	Morshedul Islam	Chowdhury Zawata Afnan, Rayan Ibtesham Chowdhury, Refayat Zinnat, Faiyaz Bin Zia, Iresh Zaker	
2011	Modhumoti	Shahjahan Chowdhury	Riaz, Ishrat Jahan Chaity, Shahidul Alam Sachchu, Saberi Alam, Masud Akhond, Elora Gohor	
2011	Khondo-Golpo '71	Badrul Anam Saud	Suborna Mustafa, Raisul Islam Asad, Intekhab Dinar	
2011	Guerrilla	Nasiruddin Yousuff	Joya Ahsan, Ferdous, Shatabdi Wadud, ATM Shamsuzzaman, Pijush Bandyopadhyay, Shampa Reza	
2011	Kusum Kusum Prem	Mushfiqur Rahman Gulzar	Ferdous, Moushumi, Riaz, ATM Shamsuzzaman, Prabir Mitra, Khaleda Aktar Kalpona	
2011	Bondhu Tumi Amar	Nazrul Islam Khan	Riaz, Purnima, Ilias Kanchan, Ali Raj, Sadek Bachchu, Don	
2012	Lal Tip	Swapan Ahmed	Emon, Kusum Sikder, ATM Shamsuzzaman, Mishu Sabbir	
2012	Karigar	Anwar Shahadat	Jayanta Chattopadhyay, Rokeya Prachy, Sushoma Sarkar, Rani Sarker, Hima, Golam Mostafa, Masud Alam Babu, Shamim Khan	
2012	Uttarer Sur	Shahnewaz Kakoli	Meghla, Utpal, Lucy Tripti Gomes, Biplob Prasad	
2012	Charulota	Saiful Islam Mannu	Shajal, Kumkum Hasan, Ilias Kanchan, Mita Noor, Shahidul Alam Sachchu	
2012	Hothat Shedin	Basu Chatterjee	Ferdous, Shimla, Ridima Ghosh, Nipun Akter, Nabin, Pran Roy	
2012	Atmodan	Shahjahan Chowdhury	Nirab, Nipun, Saberi Alam, Alamgir, Champa	
2012	Ghetuputra Komola	Humayun Ahmed	Mamun, Tariq Anam Khan, Jayanta Chattopadhyay, Munmun Ahmed	
2012	Jiddi Bou	Azad Abul Kalam	Ferdous Ahmed, Shabnur, ATM Shamsuzzaman, Tawfiq, Sheuli, Afzal Sharif	
2012	Pita	Masud Akhond	Masud Akhond, Jayanta Chattopadhyay, Bonna Mirza, Shaina Amin, Shamima Nazneen	
2013	Devdas	Chashi Nazrul Islam	Shakib Khan, Apu Biswas, Moushumi	
2013	Shiri Farhad	Gazi Mahbub	Shabnur, Riaz, Don, Ilias Kobra, Afzal Sharif	
2013	Shikhandi Kotha	Mohammad Hannan	Rakhal Sobuj, Jayanta Chattopadhyay, Rokeya Prachy, Mirana Zaman	
2013	Kajoler Dinratri	Sajal Khaled	Tonmoy, Tarin, Iresh Zaker	
2013	Onishchit Jatra	Belal Ahmed	Azad Abul Kalam, Sheuli Shila	
2013	Mrittika Maya	Gazi Rakayet	Raisul Islam Asad, Shormi Mala, Titas Zia, Lutfur Rahman George, Mamunur Rashid, Pijush Bandyopadhyay	
2013	Ekee Britte	Kazi Morshed	Khalil Ullah, Naznin Hasan Chumki, Tauquir Ahmed	
2013	Ayna Kahini	Abdur Razzak	Samraat, Keya	
2014	Akash Koto Dure	Samia Zaman	Abdur Razzak, Sharmili Ahmed, Faria Shahrin, Mostafa Prokash, Ankon	
2014	Anukrosh	Golam Mostafa Shimul	Pijush Bandyopadhyay, Khairul Alam Sabuj, Riaz Mahmud Jewel, Riaz Mahmud	
2014	Glow of the Firefly	Khalid Mahmood Mithu	Emon, Bidya Sinha Saha Mim, Kalyan Corraya	
2014	Priya Tumi Sukhi Hou	Gitali Hasan	Ferdous, Shaila Sabi, Sohel Rana, Shuchorita	
2014	Mukti	P A Kajol	Sohel Rana, Diti, Helal Khan	
2014	Headmaster	Delwar Jahan Jhantu	Suborna Mustafa, Alamgir, Bonna Mirza	
2014	Time Machine	Saiman Jahan	Airin Sultana, Kayes Arju, Ratna, Madhumani, Amin, Danny Sidak, Sadma Shah	
2013	Ant Story	Mostofa Sarwar Farooki	Noor Imran Mithu, Sheena Chohan, Sabbir Hasan Likhon, Mohini Mou	
2015	Horijupiya	Golam Mostofa Shimul	Khairul Alam Sabuj, Mahmudul Islam Mithu, Kazi Raju, Riaz Mahmud, Sabbir Ahmed, Bithi Rani Sarkar, Pavel Islam, Junaid Halim, Shafiul Alam, Nafiza Islam	
2015	Ghasphul	Akram Khan	Shaila Sabi, Tania Brishty, Kazi Asif, Naila Azad Nupur, Manos Bondyopadhyay	
2015	Nodijon	Shahnewaz Kakoli	Nirab, Toma Mirza, Pran Roy, Shormi Mala, Mamunur Rashid, Shafik Mona, Momena Chowdhury, Ripon, Biplob Prasad, Rifat Chowdhury, Tokai Sagar	
2015	Omi o Ice Cream Wala	Sumon Dhar	Abul Hayat, Jayanta Chattopadhyay, Papiya Ali Sarkar	
2014	Jalal's Story	Abu Shahed Emon	Mosharraf Karim, Arafat Rahman, Moushumi Hamid, Tauquir Ahmed, Shormi Mala, Nur E Alam Noyon, Mithai Das	
2015	Prarthona	Shahriar Nazim Joy	Tauquir Ahmed, Zara Jabir, Promiya Rahman, Mousumi Nag, Joy, Dr.Ezazul Islam, Nawsheen, Rashed	
2014	Gariwala	Ashraf Shishir	Rokeya Prachy, Raisul Islam Asad, Masum Aziz, Imran, Saki Farzana	
2015	Surinagar	Minhaz Kibria	Minhaz Kibria, Nayla, Neepa, Mizanur Rahman, Kajal Das, Pulak Haider, Faisal Khan, Marjan Nisa, Najat	
2016	Krishnopokkho	Meher Afroz Shaon	Riaz, Mahiya Mahi, Ferdous, Arfan Ahmed, Azad Abul Kalam, Tania Ahmed	
2016	Oggatonama	Tauquir Ahmed	Shahiduzzaman Selim, Mosharraf Karim, Nipun Akter, Fazlur Rahman Babu, Abul Hayat, Shatabdi Wadud	
2022	The Beauty Circus	Mahmud Didar	Jaya Ahsan, Ferdous Ahmed, ABM Sumon	
2023	Roktojoba	Niamul Mukta	Sariful Razz, Nusrat Imrose Tisha	
2025	Jol Rong	Kabirul Islam Rana	Shahiduzzaman Selim, Symon Sadik, Elina Shammi, Kayes Arju, Ushno Haque	
2026	Pressure Cooker	Raihan Rafi	Shobnom Bubly, Nazifa Tushi, Mariya Santo, Misha Sawdagor	
2026	Mission D.D.L.J.	Asif Jahangir Arko	Saad Salmi Naovi, Labonno Chowdhury	
2026	Lojja	M H Khokon	Nusraat Faria, Azmeri Haque Badhon	

Feature Films Purchased & All Rights hold by Impress Telefilm
Year	Title	Director	Artists
	Onnai	A J Mintu	Shabana, Alamgir, Suchorita, Jashim
	Abar Ekti Juddho	Badol Khondokar	Manna, Moushumi
	Pita Mata Sontan	A J Mintu	Shabana, Alamgir
	Satya Mithya	A J Mintu	Nuton, Golam Mostafa
	Ekti Songsharer Golpo	A J Mintu	Alamgir, Rozina
	Lalumastan	A J Mintu	Shabana, Jashim, Prabir Mitra
	Prothom Prem	A J Mintu	Omar Sani, Moushumi
	Bini Sutor Mala	Shilpi Chakraborti	Wasim, Rozina, Anwar Hossain, Golam Mostafa
	Pitar Ason	F I Manik	Shakib Khan, Apu Biswas, Amin Khan, Nipun, Razzak, Suchorita, Aliraj, Nasrin, Don, Kazi Hayat, Dipjol
	Hridoy Amar Naam	Monowar Khokan	Shakib Khan, Erin Zaman
	Nil Achol	F I Manik	Taufiq, Racy, Hira
	Titash Ekti Nadir Naam	Ritwik Ghatak	Rosy Samad, Kabori Sarwar, Rowshan Jamil, Rani Sarkar, Sufia Rastam, Prabir Mitra, Golam Mustafa, Ritwik Ghatak
	Padma Nadir Majhi	Goutam Gosh	Rupa Ganguly, Robi Ghosh, Utpal Dutta, Raisul Islam Asad, Sunil Mukherjee, Bimal Deb, Mukti Anwar
	The Name of a River	Anup Sing	Shibhuprasad Mukhopadhyay, Shomi Kaiser, Supriya Choudhary
	Dukhai	Morshedul Islam	Raisul Islam Asad, Chadni
1996	Dipu Number Two	Morshedul Islam	Bulbul Ahmed, Bobita, Arun, Doly Johur
	Hothat Brishti	Basu Chatterjee	Ferdous, Priyanka Trivedi, Raisul Islam Asad
	Chupi Chupi	Basu Chatterjee	Ferdous, Priyanka Trivedi
1994	Aguner Poroshmoni	Humayun Ahmed	Bipasha Hayat, Asaduzzaman Noor, Abul Hayat, Dolly Zahur, Dilara Zaman
1999	Srabon Megher Din	Humayun Ahmed	Shaon, Zahid Hasan, Mahfuz Ahmed
	Chandrakotha	Humayun Ahmed	Asaduzzaman Noor, Ferdous, Shaon, Ahmed Rubel
	Porom Priyo	Nurul Alam	Ferdous & Rosy Afsary
	Bishorjon	Kamal Ahmed	Alamgir, Shabana, Anju Ghosh
	Churiwala	Shah Alam Kiran	Ferdous, Madhumita, Abul Hayat, Soumitra Chattapaddhay
	Nondito Noroke	Belal Ahmed	Ferdous Ahmed, Monir Khan Shimul, Sumona Soma, Litu
	Adorer Jamai	Shahadat Hossain Lton	Shakib Khan, Apu Biswas, Nipun, Misha Shodugor
	Mastan Raja	Dewan Nazrul	Jashim, Shabana, Diti, Ahmed Sharif
	Ochena	Shibli Sadik	Sahbana, Alamgir, Ilias Kanchan, Champa, Ali Raj, Aruna Biswas
	Ovishopto Raat	Apurba Rana	Sahara, Alexander Bo, Amit Hasan, Poly, Misha Sawdagor
	Khelaghar	Morshedul Islam	Riaz, Sohana Saba, Gazi Rakayet, Arman Parvez Murad
	Chandragrohan	Murad Parvez	Riaz, Sohana Saba, Champa
	Rupantor	Abu Sayeed Khan	Ferdous, Jayanto Chattopadday, Saquiba Binta Ali
	Banshi	Abu Sayeed Khan	Jayanto Chattopadhyay, Amirul Haque Chowdhury, K.S. Firoz, Mamunul Haque, Tanvin Sweety
	Opekkha	Abu Sayeed Khan	Minara Zaman, Jayanto Chattopadhyay, Tinu Karim, Ujjal Mahmood, Ahsanul Haque Minu
	Oshikhkhito	Azizur Rahman	Razzak, Rosy Samad, ATM Shamsuzzaman, Master Sumon
	Ashirbad	Tamiz Uddin Rizvy	Zafar Iqbal, Anju Ghosh, Shuchonda, Golam Mostafa

== See also ==
- Cinema of Bangladesh
