= Rahmatullah Tuhin =

Bangladeshi producer, screenwriter, and director (born 1970)

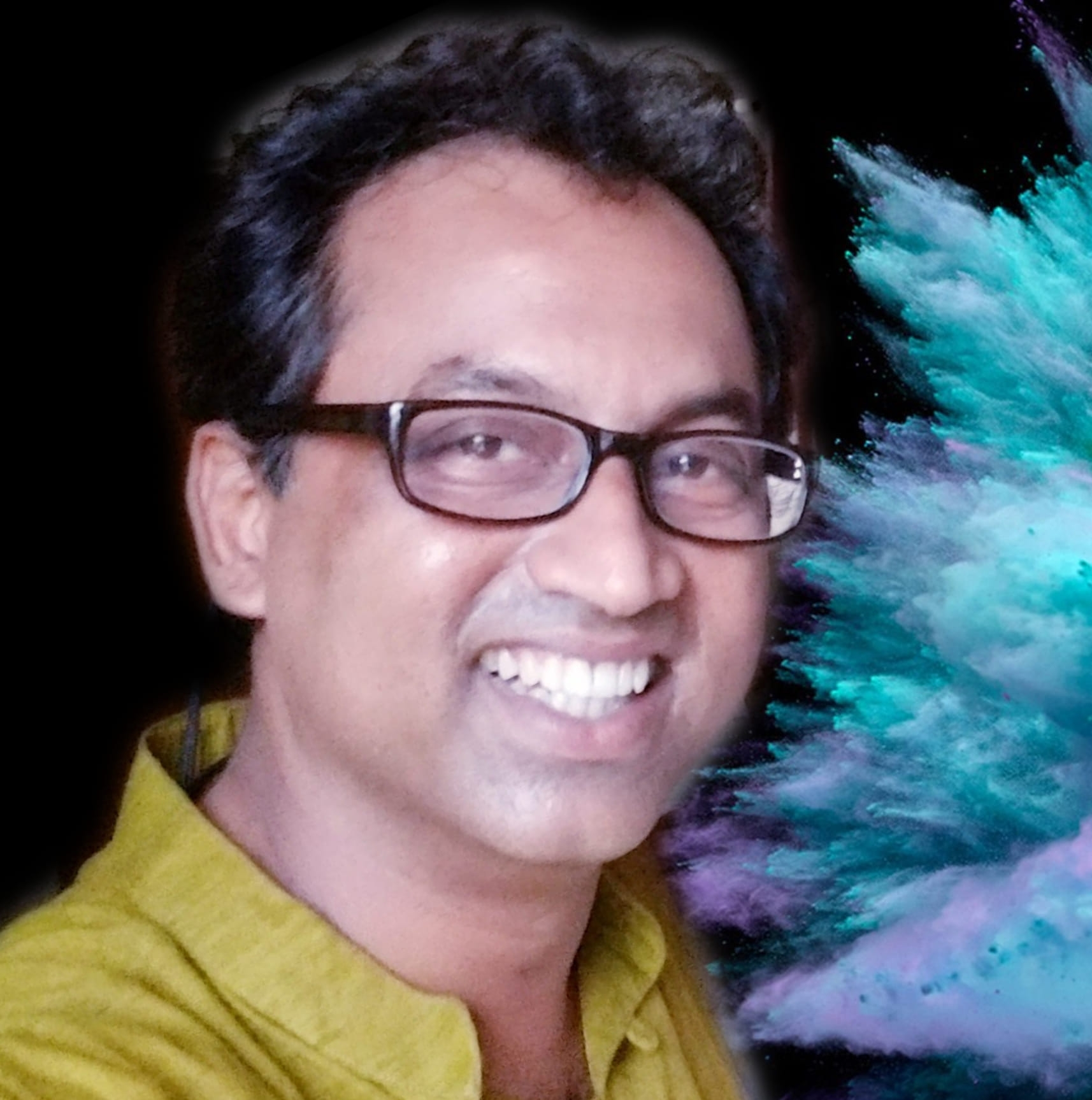
- Born: Murad Mohd Rahmatullah; 2 January 1970 (age 56); Barishal, Bangladesh
- Occupations: Producer, screenwriter and director
- Years active: 1990-present
- Notable work: The Brand New Friendship, Khonikaloy, Kakra Fuler Mala
- Website: www.rahmatullahtuhin.com

Rahmatullah Tuhin (Bengali: রহমতুললাহ্ তুহিন) is a Bangladeshi producer, screenwriter, and director. He gets best Director of TV drama award from RTV Star award 2011 & Peace Film Festival Award 2019 for The Brand New Friendship & 4th Sylhet Film Festival Award for the film Light Years Away.

== Early life and education ==
Rahmatullah Tuhin was born in Barisal on 2 January 1970. His father Mohd. Nurul Anam was a poet and a mid-level career professional of Bangladesh government. His mother Hasina Morsheda is a small entrepreneur of boutique products. He has three brothers and two sisters. At his early age, Rahmatuallh Tuhin fought against poverty and earned money as a private tutor to bear his educational expenses. He went through the real life experience of poor and repressed people of the society that made him a true director/screenwriter, producer in his professional life.

In 1993, Rahmatullah Tuhin completed his Master of Arts in psychology from the Jagannath University, Dhaka, Bangladesh.

Rahmatullah Tuhin was the member of Bangladesh Shishu Academy, Dhaka Little Theatre (Theatre Group for Children), and Kendrio Kochi Kachar Mela . In 1989, Rahmatullah Tuhin started performing on stage with THEATRE (one of the Dhaka's oldest performing stage drama group). He was also executive committee member of the Theatre group. He is still an active member of this theatre group.

== Career ==
Rahmatuallh Tuhin started his professional career as making television and radio programs, directing TV dramas, documentaries and feature films, making TV commercials, and management of commercial and trade events. Before beginning work as an independent director, Rahmatullah Tuhin has garnered working experience as a chief assistant director and co-director in several TV dramas, documentaries, and TV commercials. As a co-director, he was involved in making the feature film titled Lal Tip which was jointly produced by the Impress Telefilm Limited and a notable film producing house from France.

== Filmography ==
=== Natok ===
Year	Title	Category	TV Channel
2002	Nirbason	Single drama	Channel 1
2007	Googly	Single drama	Channel 1
2008	Avabay Sopner Suru	Single drama	Channel 1
2009	Putul Manush	Drama serial	ATN Bangla
2010	Nine Months in Briklane	Drama serial	Channel i
2011	Aholla	Single drama	RTV
2011	Khonikaloy	Drama serial	Maasranga Television
2012	Prai Rupkotha	Single drama	Boishakhi TV
2013	Bagh Bondi Khela	Single drama	Boishakhi TV
2014	Onno Sokal	Drama serial	Boishakhi TV
2014	Doitho Roop	Telefilm	RTV
2014	Bodle Jawar Golpo	Single drama	Boishakhi TV
2014	Joto Durey Jabe Bondhu	Single drama	NTV
2014	Nagorik Bunophul	Single drama	Maasranga Television
2014	Aji Bijon Ghore	Single drama	Ekushey TV
2015	Kakra Fuler Mala	Drama serial	Channel i
2015	Gontobbo Niruddesh	Drama serial	Boishakhi TV
2015	Megher Opar	Telefilm	SA TV
2015	Talk of the Town	Drama serial	Channel 4 USA
2016	Shes Bikaler Rodh	Single drama	SA TV
2016	Just Married	Drama serial	SA TV
2016	Se Ebong Tumi O Ami	Single drama	ATN Bangla
2016	Mukto	Single drama	Channel i
2016	Kokkho Number Bayanno	Drama serial	Channel 4 USA
2017	Ek Er Pore Ek	Single drama	SA TV
2017	Jokhon Kokhono	Drama serial	NTV
2018	New York Thekey Bolchhi	Drama serial	Deepto TV
2019	Bidesh Babu	Single drama	
2020	One & Only	Telefilm	RTV

=== Films ===
Year	Title	Notes
2015	Somporko	Short film
2019	The Brand New Friendship	Short film; writer, director
2019	Light Years Away (Alokborsho Dure)	Short film

== Awards ==
Year	Award name	Drama name	Results
2011	RTV Star Award (Won 2 Awards)	Aholla	Won in 2 Category
2019	Peace Film Festival Award	The Brand New Friendship	Won
2020	4th Sylhet Film Festival Award (Won 2 Awards)	Light Years Away	Won in 2 Category

== Nominations ==
Year	Festivals	Title	Nomination / Official Selection
2020	Zero Plus International Film Festival, Russia	Short Film - The Brand New Friendship	International Competition
2020	10th RTV Star Award	Drama - One & Only	Best Director
2020	18th Dhaka International Film Festival	Short Film - Light Years Away	International Competition
2020	13th International Children's Film Festival	Short Film - The Brand New Friendship	International Competition
2021	14th International Children's Film Festival	Short Film - Light Years Away	International Competition
