= Amra Ekta Cinema Banabo =

2019 film

- Official Bengali poster of the film.
- Directed by: Ashraf Shishir
- Written by: Ashraf Shishir
- Produced by: Impress Telefilm Limited
- Starring: Raisul Islam Asad; Masum Aziz; Shadhin Khosru; Sumona Shoma; Pran Roy; Elina Shammi; Sansi Faruk
- Cinematography: Mohammad Ashraful, Samar Dhali, Shabbir Mahmood
- Edited by: Shabbir Mahmood
- Music by: Rafayet Newaz
- Release date: 20 December 2019 (Bangladesh)
- Running time: 1265 minutes (around 21 hours)
- Country: Bangladesh
- Language: Bengali

Amra Ekta Cinema Banabo (transl. We will make a film; also given the English title The Innocence in promotional materials) is a 2019 black and white Bangladeshi Bengali language fictional-feature film written and directed by Ashraf Shishir and produced by Impress Telefilm Limited. With a running time of over 21 hours, Amra Ekta Cinema Banabo is the third longest non-experimental film ever made.

The film was screened in front of the censor board on May 16, 2019, and received a censor certificate from the Bangladesh Film Censor Board on May 19. It has been archived in the Bangladesh Film Archive. It was released in Bangladesh on December 20, 2019.

== Premise ==
In the tumultuous post-Liberation War Bangladesh of the early 1970s, a young man is plagued with guilt after accidentally killing an ant. His distress deepens when he encounters a peculiar vagabond who insists that life is a divine film, with God as director and countless cameras capturing every act. The vagabond says he is going to make a film and that the young man has to be the hero in it in order to repent.

The young man faces a new dilemma when the vagabond reveals that the heroine of their film is imprisoned in a neighboring town. Compelled by a sense of duty, he resolves to embark on a solo mission to save her. However, this plan is met with resistance from the vagabond, who harbors his own affections for the imprisoned heroine. Their conflicting intentions lead to a fierce confrontation, setting the stage for the unfolding events that constitute the narrative.

== Filming ==
As Head of the directing crew, led by Liam Mongie the principal photography began on January in 2009 in Rooppur village of Ishwardi Upazila in Pabna District. The entire film was shot in Ishwardi and adjacent villages surrounding the Padma river and the Hardinge Bridge. The filming was completed in 176 days of shooting over 9 years and was attended by 4,000 artists.

== Music ==
The music of the film is composed by Rafayet Newaz. It is performed by Subir Nandi, Shironamhin, Elita Karim, Niladri, Shoeb, Shumi, Raju, Samira, Abbasi, Toolip.

== See also ==
- List of longest films
