= 37th Bangladesh National Film Awards =

National Film Awards, Bangladesh

- Awarded for: Best of Bangladeshi Cinema in 2012
- Awarded by: President of Bangladesh
- Presented by: Ministry of Information
- Presented on: 10 May 2014
- Site: Dhaka, Bangladesh
- Hosted by: Ferdous Ahmed and Moushumi
- Official website: moi.gov.bd

Highlights
- Best Feature Film: Uttarer Sur
- Best Actor: Shakib Khan; Khodar Pore Ma
- Best Actress: Joya Ahsan; Chorabali
- Lifetime achievement: Khalil Ullah Khan
- Most awards: Ghetuputra Komola (9)

The 37th National Film Awards were presented by the Ministry of Information, Bangladesh, to felicitate the best of Bangladeshi cinema released in 2012. The prime minister handed awards to the winners during the National Film Awards 2012 ceremony on 10 May 2014 at Bangabandhu International Conference Center, Dhaka.

== List of winners ==
National Film Awards were given in 24 categories.

Name of Awards	Winner(s)	Film
Lifetime Achievement Award	Khalil Ullah Khan	
Best Film	Faridur Reza Sagar (Impress Telefilm Limited)	Uttarer Sur
Best Director	Humayun Ahmed	Ghetuputra Komola
Best Actor	Shakib Khan	Khodar Pore Ma
Best Actress	Joya Ahsan	Chorabali
Best Actor in a Supporting Role	ATM Shamsuzzaman	Chorabali
Best Actress in a Supporting Role	Lucy Tripti Gomes	Uttarer Sur
Best Actor in a Negative Role	Shahiduzzaman Selim	Chorabali
Best Child Artist	Mamun	Ghetuputra Komola
Best Child Artist (Special)	Meghla	Uttarer Sur
Best Music Director	Emon Saha	Ghetuputra Komola
Best Music Composer	Emon Saha	Pita
Best Lyricist	Milton Khondokar	Khodar Pore Ma
Best Male Playback Singer	Mortoza Polash	Khodar Pore Ma
Best Female Playback Singer	Runa Laila	Tumi Ashbe Bole
Best Story	Humayun Ahmed	Ghetuputra Komola
Best Dialogue	Redoan Rony	Chorabali
Best Screenplay	Humayun Ahmed	Ghetuputra Komola
Best Art Direction	Uttam Guho and Kalantor	Raja Surjo Kha
Best Editing	Solimullah	Ghetuputra Komola
Best Cinematography	Mahfuzur Rahman Khan	Ghetuputra Komola
Best Sound Recording	Ripon Nath	Chorabali
Best Costume Design	S.M. Mainuddin	Ghetuputra Komola
Best Makeup	Khalilur Rahman	Ghetuputra Komola

== Host and performance ==
Actors Ferdous Ahmed and Moushumi anchored the cultural programme after the award distribution ceremony. The history of Bangladeshi film was presented through performances of songs including "Karar Oi Loho Kopat", "Aynate Oi Mukh Dekhbe Jokhon", "Are O Praner Raja", "Bimurto Ei Ratri Amar", "Ki Jadu Korila", "Bender Meye Jostna", and "Ekatturer Maa Jononi".

Sabina Yasmin sang her song "Koto Sadhonay Emon Bhagyo Mele" and Subir Nandi sang "Din Jay Kotha Thake". S.I. Tutul, Dilshad Nahar Kona, and Habib Wahid also performed at the event.

The final performance of the night was a group dance recitation by Omar Sany, Zayed Khan, Nirob, Nipun Akter, Shimla, and Amrita Khan.

== See also ==
- Meril Prothom Alo Awards
- Ifad Film Club Award
- Babisas Award
