= Jaanwar =

Jaanwar or Janwar may refer to:

- Janwar (1965 film), a 1965 Indian drama film by Bhappi Sonie, starring Shammi Kapoor and Rajshree
- Jaanwar (1982 film), a 1982 Indian wildlife drama film by S. Ali Raza, starring Rajesh Khanna and Zeenat Aman
- Jaanwar (1999 film), a 1999 Indian crime drama film by Suneel Darshan, starting Akshay Kumar and Karishma Kapoor
- Jaanwar (2021) or Janowar, a 2021 Bangladeshi film

== See also ==
- Janwar Aur Insaan, a 1972 Indian wildlife film by Chanakya, starring Shashi Kapoor and Rakhee Gulzar
