= Gohine Shobdo =

Bangladeshi film

- Theatrical release poster
- Directed by: Khalid Mahmud Mithu
- Written by: A.K Azad; Khalid Mahmood Mithu
- Produced by: Ebne Hasan Khan; Faridur Reza Sagar (Impress Telefilm Ltd.)
- Starring: Mamnun Hasan Emon; Kusum Sikder; Masum Aziz; Abul Hayat
- Cinematography: Hasan Ahmed
- Edited by: Hero Chakma
- Music by: Farid Ahmed
- Distributed by: Impress Telefilm Ltd.
- Release date: 26 March 2010
- Running time: 105 minutes
- Country: Bangladesh
- Language: Bengali

Gohine Shobdo (Bengali: গহীনে শব্দ) is a 2010 Bangladeshi drama film directed by Khalid Mahmood Mithu. Set during the Bangladesh Liberation War of 1971, the film focuses on a love couple and beggars and stars Mamnun Hasan Emon, Kusum Sikder, Masum Aziz, and Abul Hayat. It was released on 26 March 2010 by Impress Telefilm and won the Best Feature Film at the Third World Independent Film Festival in the United States.

== Plot ==
Nura is a street beggar. During the 1971 liberation war in Bangladesh, one of his legs became paralyzed. The Razakars attacked him, subsequently making him a crippled man. As a father, he has familial obligations that he could not abandon: he begs in the streets through rain and shine to make his dream a reality — to ensure that his daughter, Swapna, completes her education as a university student. Nura took part in the liberation struggle against the Pakistan Army. His attitude to life is different and does not have any regrets over his poverty, rather he enjoys begging as he sings in his native tongue, the Bengali language. He feels that Bangladesh would not have been liberated if he had to speak and sing in Urdu, which is a foreign language for him.

On the other hand, the Talukder family is rich and well-educated. The senior Talukder was a pioneering personality in photojournalism starting from the language movement of 1952 to the 1971 liberation war. These are all now historical documents. But nobody is happy in this family. The senior Talukder tries to implant progressive ideas in his grandchildren because the present generation are not aware at all of this liberation struggle. At the same time, the anti-liberation forces try to exploit the liberation war in their own interests. Niloy, a scion of this family, is in contrast with the poor Swapna, the university student daughter of Nura the beggar. Niloy fell in love with Swapna listening to her songs while preparing for the Bengali New Year celebration and he proposes to her.

Swapna tries to convince him that this is rather impossible as they are poles apart. She tells him her parents are almost starving to educate her. Led by impulse, Niloy vows to marry her-saying he would go deep down her heart, explore the dark resonance of her heart, and marry her. But Niloy is defeated before the reality of life: He can never accept the fact that his would-be father-in-law is a street beggar. He escapes from life, escapes from her, fleeing to another country.

An eminent singer arranges a concert for the beggars. They circle around and move singing with lamps in their hands. The life cycle is complete. Occasionally the life cycle is disturbed but it never stops. Human beings like Swapna start a new life, and the life cycle begins again.

== Cast ==
- Mamnun Hasan Emon as Niloy
- Kusum Sikder as Swapna
- Masum Aziz as Nura
- Haidar Ali Khan
- Arifur Haque
- Abul Hayat
- Khaleda Akter Kolpona
- Shams Sumon
- Salim Sultan

== Awards ==
- Best Feature Film, International Category, Okanagan International Film Festival, Vancouver, British Columbia, Canada
- Best Feature Film, Third World Independent Film Festival, US
- Selected for screening, Silent River Film Festival, US
- Best Director, Silent River Film Festival
- Best Child Actress, Silent River Film Festival
- Best Actor, Silent River Film Festival
