= Tuhin =

Tuhin is both a given name and a surname. Notable people with the name include:

- Tuhin Das (born 2000), Indian footballer
- Tuhin Das (writer) (born 1985), Indian activist
- Tuhin Sinha, Indian author
- Kumar Tuhin, Indian diplomat
- Sabina Akter Tuhin, Bangladeshi politician
- Shafiq Tuhin (born 1976), Bangladeshi lyricist
- Shahrin Islam Tuhin, Bangladeshi politician
- Rahmatullah Tuhin (born 1970), Bangladeshi producer
- Tuhin Hatimuria (born 2006), Assamese editor
- Tuhin Maity (born 1977) Biochemist and health economist
