= Ghatu =

Ghatu may refer to:

- Ghatu (dance), a Nepalese folk dance
- Ghatu (song), a form of traditional Bengali folk song
