= Akash Mahal =

2019 Bangladeshi film

- Movie poster
- Directed by: Delwar Jahan Jhantu
- Written by: Delwar Jahan Jhantu
- Produced by: Faridur Reza Sagar
- Starring: Emon; Airin Sultana
- Music by: Anwar Jahan Jhantu
- Production company: Impress Telefilms
- Release date: August 2, 2019
- Country: Bangladesh
- Language: Bengali

Akash Mahal (Bengali: আকাশ মহল) is a 2019 Bangladeshi folk fantasy film directed by Delwar Jahan Jhantu. It features Emon and Airin Sultana in the lead roles. The film marked as 75th directorial venture of Delwar Jahan Jhantu.

== Cast ==
- Emon
- Airin Sultana
- Danny Sidak

== Release ==
The film released in theatre on August 2, 2019.
