= Elina Shammi =

Bangladeshi model, presenter and actress

- Born: Alina Siddique; 1 June; Khulna
- Occupations: Actress, writer, model, presenter
- Years active: 2014-present
- Notable work: Priyotoma (2023)

Elina Shammi is a Bangladeshi model, presenter and actress. She made her debut in Shah Alam Kiron's '71 Er Ma Jononi in 2014. Known for her roles in Priyotoma and Mujib: The Making of a Nation, where she portrayed Khaleda Zia, the former prime minister of Bangladesh.

== Career ==
She made her debut with Shah Alam Kiran's war drama '71 Er Ma Jononi in 2014, based on the Bangladesh Liberation War. In 2021, she starred in Raihan Rafi's web film Janowar, which earned her praise. In late 2019, she appeared in Ashraf Shishir's longest non-experimental film and one of the longest film ever made Amra Ekti Cinema Banabo.

In 2020, she acted as Colonel Hamid's wife in the Ashraf Shishir's 570, revolves around the 36 hours that followed the assassination of Sheikh Mujibur Rahman, and his family, the founding father and the first president of Bangladesh. It has not been released yet. In March 2021, her fourth film Aranno Polash's war drama Gontobbyo was released, inspired by the historic 7 March Speech of Sheikh Mujibur Rahman, where she spent Tk 42 lakh. Then she played as an official of the detective bench of the Bangladesh Police in Anonno Mamun's thriller Koshai.

In the beginning of 2022, she appeared in Eftekhar Shuvo's mystery thriller Mukhosh, grants by the government of Bangladesh. Then she appeared with Jaya Ahsan in Mahmud Didar's government grants The Beauty Circus, which received critical acclaim from critics and earned Ahsan's fifth National Film Award for Best Actress. In September 2022, she appeared in Rakibul Islam Rakib's drama Vaiya Re (Dear Brother). In late 2022, she played as a scientist in Zulfiqure Zahedi's romantic thriller Kagaj: The Paper. In the beginning of 2023, she played as Afsana Ara Bindu's elder sister in Mizanur Rahman Aryan's Chorki originals' web film Unish20, where Bindu made a comeback after eight years. Then she appeared in Anonno Mamun's Bangladesh Liberation War film Radio, which is about the historic 7 March Speech of Sheikh Mujibur Rahman. In mid-2023, she collaborate with Shakib Khan for the first time, played as his sister-in-law in the Himel Ashraf's tragic romance Priyotoma. She gained popularity and critical acclaim with the film, which became the highest grossing Bangladeshi film of all time. In September 2023, she appeared in Mushfiqur Rahman Gulzar's The Brave Son, based on Sheikh Mujibur Rahman's early life. Then she played as role of former prime minister of Bangladesh Khaleda Zia in Shyam Benegal's epic historical drama Mujib: The Making of a Nation, which follows the life of Sheikh Mujibur Rahman, the founding father and first president of Bangladesh. Where she was signed in late 2021. She will also performed with Shakib Khan in first Indo-Bangladesh joint Pan-Indian film Dard, which will be released in February 2024.

=== Other works ===
Elina Shammi started her media career through a live programme titled Dur Path on Desh TV. Afterwards, she has presented news on different television channels.

She has acted in many popular single-episode TV plays and drama serials in her career as well.

== Filmography ==
Key
†	Denotes films that have not yet been released

Year	Film	Role	Notes	Ref
2014	'71 Er Ma Jononi		Debut Film	
2019	The Innocence		Longest non-experimental film	
2020	570	Colonel Hamid's wife	Unreleased	
2021	Gontobbyo			
2021	Koshai	Naznin		
2022	Mukhosh			
2022	The Beauty Circus	Sayera Banu		
2022	Kagaj: The Paper			
2022	Vaiya Re			
2023	Radio			
2023	Priyotoma	Sujon's wife		
2023	The Brave Son			
2023	Mujib: The Making of a Nation	Khaleda Zia		
2024	Dard	AIO Bonna		
2025	Moddhobitto	Ranu		
2025	Jol Rong	Sitara		
2026	Cut-Piece			

=== Web contents ===
Year	Film	Role	Director	Notes	Ref
2021	Janowar		Raihan Rafi	Released on Cinematic	
2022	Syndicate	Naila	Shihab Shaheen		
2023	Unish20	Mila	Mizanur Rahman Aryan	Released on Chorki	
