= Radio (2023 film) =

- Directed by: Anonno Mamun
- Written by: Anon Zaman
- Story by: Anon Zaman
- Produced by: Mozammel Hossain Chowdhury
- Starring: Riaz Ahmed; Zakia Bari Momo; Nader Chowdhury; Lutfur Rahman George
- Music by: Emon Saha
- Production company: Taranga Production
- Distributed by: Impress Telefilm Ltd.
- Release date: 10 March 2023
- Country: Bangladesh
- Language: Bengali

Radio (Bengali: রেডিও) is a 2023 Bangladeshi war-drama film about the Bangladesh Liberation War. The film was directed by Anonno Mamun and written by Anon Zaman. The film is about the historic 7 March speech of Bangabandhu Sheikh Mujibur Rahman. It had a limited premiere on television on 7 March 2023, and was later released in cinema halls. Taranga Production produced the film.

== Plot ==
Throughout the movie, the audience will see how Bangabandhu's historic 7 March Speech inspired the village people to go to war.

== Cast ==
- Riaz Ahmed
- Zakia Bari Momo
- Lutfur Rahman George
- Nader Chowdhury
- Pran Ray
- Elina Shammi
- Tanzila Haque Maisha
- Shofiul Alam Babu

== Production ==
The movie was produced by Taranga Production and distributed by Impress Telefilm Ltd.

== Release ==
Radio had a special premiere held at FDC's Zahir Raihan auditorium. It had a limited premiere on television on 7 March 2023. Later it was released in cinema halls on 10 March 2023.
