= Molla Barir Bou =

- Movies commercial poster
- Directed by: Salauddin Lavlu
- Written by: ATM Shamsuzzaman
- Produced by: Abbas Ullah Shikder
- Starring: Moushumi; Riaz; Shabnur; ATM Shamsuzzaman; Pran Roy; Chitralekha Guho; Keramat Mawla; Khairul Alam Sabuj; Wahida Mollick Jolly; Masud Ali Khan
- Cinematography: Hasan Ahmmed
- Edited by: Fazle Haque
- Music by: Imon Saha
- Distributed by: Chhayachhando Chalochitra
- Release date: 2005
- Running time: 156 minutes
- Country: Bangladesh
- Language: Bengali

Molla Barir Bou is a Bangladeshi Bengali-language film, directed by Bangladeshi famous television drama director-writer Salauddin Lavlu and written by famous actor-writer ATM Shamsuzzaman. It was produced and distributed by Chhayachhando Chalochitra. It stars Moushumi, Riaz, Shabnur, ATM Shamsuzzaman, Pran Roy, Chitralekha Guho, Keramat Mawla, Khairul Alam Sabuj, Wahida Mollick Jolly, Masud Ali Khan and many more.

Molla Barir Bou is a fully family drama based film. The film was released in 2005 all over Bangladesh. It got great popularity from all categories of film viewers of Bangladesh. The film won Lux-Channel I Performance Awards for best director in 2005. This film was selected for preservation in Bangladesh Film Archive.

== Plot ==
The charming story of the film is picked up from village life. The mischief of the so-called 'Molla' who has no knowledge except fanatic sentiments perturbed all. His home is the seat of an oppressive regime.

== Cast ==
| Actor/Actress | Roles |
|---|---|
| ATM Shamsuzzaman | Gazi Ebadat Molla |
| Moushumi | Bokul |
| Riaz | Jowan Gazi |
| Shabnur | Parul |
| Pran Roy | Master |
| Chitralekha Guho | Boistami |
| Keramat Mawla | Ojha |
| Khairul Alam Sabuj | Bokul's Father |
| Wahida Mollick Jolly | |
| Masud Ali Khan | Dr. Nibaran |

== Crew ==
- Director: Salauddin Lavlu
- Chief Assistant Director: Azharul Alam Babu
- Producer: Chhayachhando Chalochitra
- Story: ATM Shamsuzzaman
- Screenplay: Salauddin Lavlu
- Dialog: Masum Reza
- Script: Masum Reza
- Music: Imon Saha
- Lyrics: Shah Alam Sarkar and Kabir Bokul
- Cinematography: Hasan Ahmmed
- Editing: Fazley Haque
- Distributor: Chhayachhando Chalochitra
- Choreography: Masum Babul
- Set: Jashim and Selim
- Dress: Imdadul Haque Khokon
- Song Recording: Tan Recording Studio
- Dubbing: Dobni Chitra

== Technical details ==
- Format: 35 MM (color)
- Year of the Product: 2004
- Technical Support: Bangladesh Film Development Corporation (BFDC)

== Award and achievements ==
=== Lux-Channel I Performance Awards ===
- Winner Best Director: Salauddin Lavlu 2005.

== Music ==
Molla Barir Bou

Soundtrack album by Imon Saha
- Released: 2005 (Bangladesh)
- Recorded: 2005
- Label: G-Series
- Producer: G-Series

The film's music was directed by Imon Saha. Lyrics by Shah Alam Sarkar and Kabir Bokul, and playback singers Andrew Kishore, Sabina Yasmin, Momotaj, Monir Khan, Asif Akbar, Baby Nazmin and Kanak Chapa.

=== Soundtrack ===
| Tracks | Titles | Singers | Performers |
|---|---|---|---|
| 1 | O Boner Kokil Kokil Re | Sabina Yasmin | Moushumi |
| 2 | Bandhilam Piriter Ghor | Momotaj | Chitalekha Guho |
| 3 | Khor Kutar Ek Basa Bandlam | Monir Khan | Keramat Mawla |
| 4 | Antor Dilam Bichhaia | Andrew Kishore and Kanak Chapa | Riaz and Shabnur |
| 5 | Antorer Agun Amar | Momotaj and Kanak Chapa | Chitalekha Guho and Moushumi |
| 6 | Dekhechhi Prothombar | Asif and Baby Nazmin | Riaz and Shabnur |

== Box office ==
Molla Barir Bou was released in 2005 in Bangladesh, and was considered a blockbuster at the box office.
