= Nodijon =

- Poster
- Directed by: Shahneoyaj Cacoli
- Written by: Shaikh Zahurul Haque
- Screenplay by: Shahneoyaj Cacoli
- Story by: Shaikh Zahurul Haque
- Based on: Gun by Shaikh Zahurul Haque
- Produced by: Faridur Reza Sagor; Ibn Hasan Khan
- Starring: Mamunur Rashid; Pran Roy; Tama Mirza; Nirab Hossain
- Cinematography: Shahneoyaj Cacoli
- Edited by: Shuhrab Hossain
- Music by: Emon Saha
- Production company: Impress Telefilm
- Distributed by: Impress Telefilm
- Release date: 18 July 2015
- Running time: 127 minutes
- Country: Bangladesh
- Language: Bengali

Nodijon is a 2015 Bangladeshi drama film directed by Shahneoyaj Cacoli. The screenplay of the film is written by Shahneoyaj Cacoli, based on the story of Shaikh Zahurul Haque's novel Gun. The film is produced and distributed by Impress Telefilm. It stars Mamunur Rashid, Pran Roy, Sharmimala, Tama Mirza and Nirab Hossain in the lead roles.

Nodijon premiered at the Bengaluru International Film Festival in India in December 2014 and later screened at the 10th Geneva International Oriental Film Festival on 29 March 2015. It was later released in Bangladesh on Eid-ul-Fitr on 18 July 2015. Tama Mirza won the Best Supporting Actress award at the 40th Bangladesh National Film Awards for her performance as Chhaya in the film.

== Cast ==
- Mamunur Rashid as Fateh Ali Khan
- Pran Roy as Ayanuddin
- Shormi Mala as Samachhi
- Tama Mirza as Chhaya
- Nirab Hossain as Sujan
- Shafiq Mana
- Momena Chowdhury as Lovely
- Mamun Chowdhury Ripon
- Biplob Prasad as Chaya's father
- Rifat Chowdhury as Doctor
- Sagor as Choton
- Sheikh Mohiuddin

== Production ==
=== Screenplay ===
Shahneoyaj Cacoli wrote the screenplay for the film, based on the story of Sheikh Zahurul Haque's novel Gun. The film was initially titled 'Dheu'. Later, the title was changed to 'Nodijon'.

=== Casting ===
Cacoli had been with Pran Roy since the time he wrote the script. Kakoli selected him for the role of Ayan in the lead role. Sharmimala was selected for the role of his wife Shamchi. Mamunur Rashid was selected for the role of the negative character Fateh Ali Khan. Considering the commercial aspect of Kakoli's film, Tama Mirza and Nirab Hossain were selected for the two supporting roles.

=== Filming ===
The film Nadijon was shot on 22 October 2013 in Shilaidah, Kushtia. Some scenes of the film were shot in the Gorai and Padma rivers. In this context, director Kakoli said, "There are big boats available. We have given one such boat the look of the old days. Now, you can't see a sailing boat anymore. We shot on that boat for three days straight. Because, Nadijon, the boatman, is one of the characters in the film."

== Release ==
The film Nadijon was screened at the Bangalore International Film Festival in India in December 2014 and at the 10th Geneva International Oriental Film Festival on 29 March 2015. The film had its TV premiere on Bangladeshi television channel Channel i on Eid-ul-Fitr on 18 July 2015.

== Awards ==
Award	Category	Winner	Result	Ref.
40th Bangladesh National Film Awards	Best Supporting Actress	Tama Mirza	Won	
