= Gariwala =

Bangladeshi film

- Directed by: Ashraf Shishir
- Written by: Ashraf Shishir
- Starring: Rokeya Prachy; Raisul Islam Asad; Masum Aziz; Maruf; Kabbo
- Cinematography: Shohag Chowdhury
- Edited by: Shabbir Mahmood
- Music by: Rafayet Newaz
- Production company: Impress Telefilm
- Distributed by: Impress Telefilm
- Release dates: 23 October 2014 (UAE); 24 September 2015 (Bangladesh)
- Running time: 76 minutes (feature version)
- Country: Bangladesh
- Language: Bengali

Gariwala (English title: Cart driver) is a 2014 Bangladeshi film written and directed by Ashraf Shishir, and starring Rokeya Prachy, Raisul Islam Asad, Masum Aziz, Imran Imu, and child artists Maruf and Kabbo.

Funded by a Bangladesh government grant, Gariwala began as a short film before being expanded to feature length. It premiered at the Sharjah International Film Festival for Children & Youth in the United Arab Emirates on 23 October 2014. It toured extensively on the festival circuit, where its runtime was commonly described as 76 minutes. It opened in Bangladesh on 24 September 2015. It won the Bangladesh National Film Award for Best Short Film in 2014.

== Cast ==
- Rokeya Prachy
- Raisul Islam Asad
- Masum Aziz
- Maruf
- Kabbo
- Imran Imu
- Sansi Faruk
- R J Mukul
- Saki Farzana

== Release and reception ==
Gariwala premiered at the Sharjah International Film Festival for Children & Youth in the United Arab Emirates on 23 October 2014. It was shown at numerous other international film festivals including the Kolkata International Film Festival, Moondance International Film Festival, and Red Rock Film Festival. The film opened in Bangladesh on 24 September 2015.

== Accolades ==
- Won Bangladesh National Film Award for Best Short Film for 2014 (awarded in 2016).
