= Mishu Sabbir =

Bangladeshi actor and model (b. 1982)

- মিশু সাব্বির
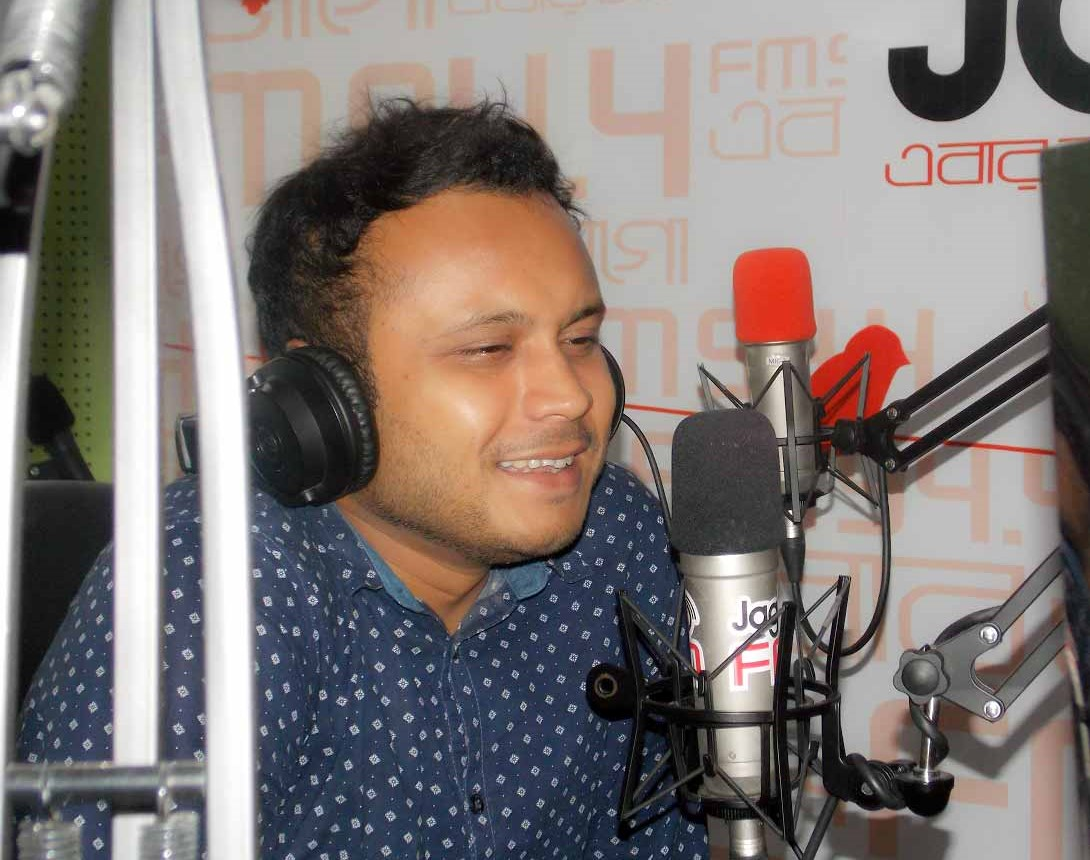
- Born: October 28, 1982 (age 43); Bangladesh
- Occupation: Actor
- Years active: 2006 - present
- Notable work: House Full; Bachelor Point
- Spouse: Shamma Holud (m. 2013)

Md. Sabbir Hossain Mishu, known by his stage name Mishu Sabbir is a Bangladeshi television actor and model. He became very popular among the audience, especially among the youth, by playing the role of "Shuvo" in the drama Bachelor Point.

== Early life and education ==
Md. Sabbir Hossain Mishu, known by his stage name Mishu Sabbir, was born on 28 October 1982 in Dhaka, Bangladesh. He completed his Bachelor of Science in computer science from Independent University, Bangladesh. Although he had an interest in acting from a young age, he initially worked in event management and media production. He entered the acting industry in 2006 and gained recognition for his performance in the television drama Housefull in 2008.

== Career ==
Sabbir performed in Lal Tip (2012), a big budget film of Impress Telefilm Limited.

== Works ==
=== Films ===
- Lal Tip (2012)
- Valobasha Emoni Hoy (2016)
- To Be Continued (2017) as Mac

=== Drama, telefilm, mini-series and TV series ===
- Housefull (2008) as Mishu
- Behind The Scene
- Biporitey Ami (2008) as Akmol
- Hello (2009) as Kashem
- Graduate (2010) as Ayub
- Jimmi (2010) as Mishu
- Denmohor
- Idiots (2012)
- Radio Chocolate
- College
- @18: All Time Dourer Upor (2013) as Baby Bappi
- Moneybag (2013) as Pilot
- Faad O Bogar Golpo
- Bhalobasha 101 (2014) as Mishu
- Vitamin-T (2014) as Bulbul aka BB
- Selfiebazz (2015)
- Haar Naki Jeet (2016)
- House 44
- Cheleta Kintu Valo Chilo (2017)
- Chabial Reunion (2017)
- Journey by Launch (2017)
- Karsaji
- Bachelor Point (2018; Present) as Shuvo
- Arekti Shondeher Golpo (2019)
- Cholo Palai (2019)
- Bachelor DJ Party (2019)
- Network Busy (2019)
- Bachelor Trip (2019)
- Bachelor Eid (2019)
- Stadium (2020) as Zubayerullah Zafor aka Jojo
- Twist (2020)
- Bachelor Quarantine (2020)
- Nakshi (2021)
- Female (2021) as Body Sohel
- The Beggar (2021)
- Thanda (2021)
- Hoichoi Paribaar (2021)
- Mone Korone Moron (2022)
- Doi (2022)
- Bachelor's Ramadan (2022)
- Good Buzz (2022)
- Female (1-4)
- Bad Buzz
- Epare Boshonto
- Dost Dushmon
- Ex-er Bichar Chai
- Golpota Bhikkhuker
- Oporichito Jon
- Search the Girlfriend
- Goriber Abar Somman
- Agun Prem
- Holud Morich
- Sustho Thakun
- Unexpected Love
- Rajshahi Local
- Bidesh
- Bariwalar Chele Varatiar Meye
- Silent Bou
- Bachelor Sublet
- Ghapla
- Local Boy vs Beauty Queen
- Ekdin Chakuri Hobe
- Bahar Baburchi
- Tablet
- Bhaijaan
- Lash Ghor
- Foreign Girlfriend
- Gold Digger
- Asol Purush
- Lungibaz
- Sweet Robot
- Password Ferot Chai
- Amar Breakup Chai
- Mr. Gittu
- Pressure Kicker
- Super Hero
- Kokhono Fire Esho na
- Beauty, I love you
- Prem Korbo Kintu Biye Korbo Na
- Frustration
- Ex vs Present
- Dakat
- Qurbani
- Bou er Chap
- Proxy Lover
- Danger Love
- Sad Ending
- Biye Hobe
- Chul Tar Kobekar
- Letter Box
- Journey by Marriage
- Tontro Montro Lag Velki
- Ovimaner Golpora
- Chokka
