= Glow of the Firefly =

2014 film

Jonakir Alo
- Film poster
- Directed by: Khalid Mahmud Mithu
- Written by: Khalid Mahmud Mithu
- Starring: Emon; Bidya Sinha Saha Mim; Kalyan
- Production company: Impress Telefilm
- Release date: 12 April 2014 (Bangladesh)
- Running time: 101 minutes
- Country: Bangladesh
- Language: Bengali

Glow of the Firefly (Bengali: জোনাকির আলো, romanized: Jonakir Alo) is a 2014 Bangladeshi drama film written and directed by Khalid Mahmud Mithu. It was selected as the Bangladeshi entry for the Best Foreign Language Film at the 87th Academy Awards, but was not nominated.

== Cast ==
- Emon as Suborno
- Bidya Sinha Saha Mim as Kabita
- Kalyan Corraya
- Tariq Anam Khan
- Diti
- Mita Choudowary
- Masud Ali Khan as Anis
- Gazi Rakayet as SM Sultan
- Shams Sumon
- Putul
- Anis
- Farhan Mahmud as Porosh

== See also ==
- List of submissions to the 87th Academy Awards for Best Foreign Language Film
- List of Bangladeshi submissions for the Academy Award for Best Foreign Language Film
