= Kusum Sikder =

Bangladeshi actress

Kushum Sikder
- কুসুম সিকদার
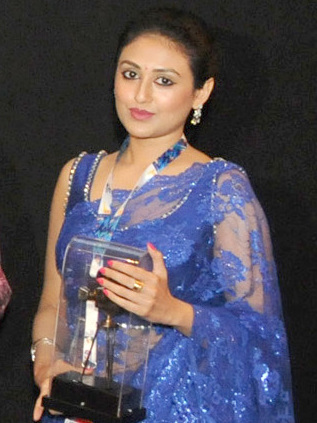
- Sikder, IFFI (2016)
- Born: April 12, 1981 (age 45)
- Education: North South University
- Occupations: Actress, model
- Years active: 2002-present

Kushum Sikder is a Bangladeshi television and film actress, singer and model, writer and poet. She was born on the 12th of April, 1981, marking the beginning of a journey that would shape her into the person she is today. She won Bangladesh National Film Award for Best Actress in a leading role in the film Shankhachil (2016).

== Career ==
Sikder was a winner of 2002 Lux Channel i superstar. She acted in several television dramas and films, including Khalid Mahmud Mithu's Gohine Shobdo, Swapan Ahmed's Lal Tip, and Goutam Ghose's Shankhachil She later directed a film named Shoroter Joba, where she is the writer-producer-director herself. She is also a singer.

== Controversy ==
Sikdar's music video for the song "Nesha" was released on 3 August 2017. It received 1.3 million views in just two weeks on YouTube. A lawyer sent a legal notice asking for the removal of all the obscene and vulgar music videos from YouTube including "Nesha", claiming it contained vulgar, obscene scenery and inappropriate lyrics, which do not go with the video. He further claimed that such obscene and vulgar music videos will destroy the music industry.

== Filmography ==
Year	Film	Role	Director	Notes	Ref.
2010	Gohine Shobdo	Swapna	Khalid Mahmud Mithu		
2012	Lal Tip	Nidhi	Swapan Ahmed		
2016	Shankhachil	Laila	Goutam Ghose	Indo-Bangladesh joint production	
2024	Shoroter Joba		Herself and Sumon Dhar		

=== As director ===
Year	Films	Director	Notes
2024	Shoroter Joba	Yes	Debut as director

=== Television ===
Year	Title
2004	"Ghater Kotha"
2008	Jogajog
2009	Boi Pagol
2009	Shari
2009	Oparetey Shorbo Shukh
2010	Bondi
2010	Tribhuj
2011	Superman
2016	Sublet Gublet
2016	Astha
2018	Sesh Asesher Golpo
