= Kanak Chanpa Chakma =

Bangladeshi artist

- কনক চাঁপা চাকমা
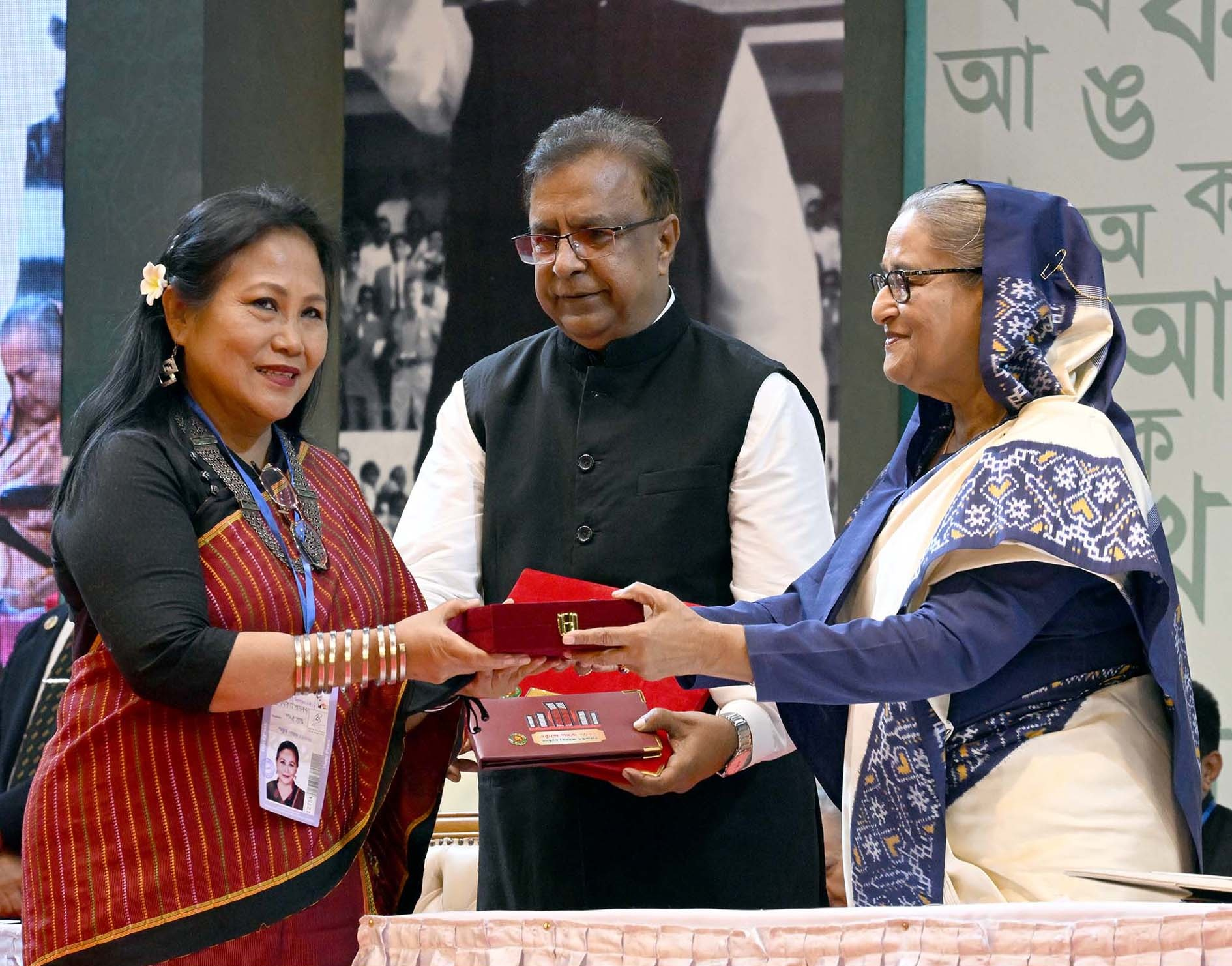
- Kanak Chanpa Chakma (leftmost) receives Ekushey Padak 2023.
- Born: 6 May 1963 (age 63); Rangamati Hill Tract, East Pakistan, Pakistan
- Education: University of Dhaka
- Occupation: Artist
- Spouse: Khalid Mahmood Mithu
- Children: 2
- Awards: See full list

Kanak Chanpa Chakma (born 6 May 1963) is a Bangladeshi Chakma artist. She is known for her paintings depicting the lives of Bangladeshi ethnic minorities, focusing on the lives of women, and their daily lives combining semi-realistic and abstract in the same frame.

Chanpa was awarded Ekushey Padak in 2023 for her contribution to painting.

== Biography ==
Chanpa was born in 1963 in the Rangamati Hill Tracts, in a small town named Tabal Chari, a remote hill area. She is a member of the Chakma people. Her father is a retired businessman and her mother is a textile designer and weaver who has twice won national awards for her work. She attended the School of Art, University of Dhaka in Bangladesh and received her Master of Fine Arts degree in 1986. Later she studied art at Pennsylvania State University in the United States from 1993 to 1994, where she received the Mid-American Arts Alliance Fellowship. She returned to Bangladesh after successful completion of her course. Her husband, Khalid Mahmood Mithu, is an artist and filmmaker, and her two children are also artists and musicians. She cites her family as the "first viewers" of any of her finished paintings.

In her solo exhibition, Life is Here, held in 2014 at Bengal Art Lounge in Dhaka, Bangladesh, Kanak paid tribute to her own community, the Chakmas, with 80 paintings.

== Art work ==
Kanak's works often focus upon women, with men appearing only to stress the subjectivity and centrality of women. She explains her focus upon women in her paintings thus: "In plains and in hills, women are similarly cornered, even though they often contribute more than men to their families. I therefore prefer to centralise women in my works."

She cites the "vivid colours of indigenous attire, the hills, forests, 'jhum' cultivation, pristine blue waterfalls, dance and music; in other words, anything that defines life in the hilly areas of Bangladesh" as major inspirations for her work, and says she has also been inspired by the Impressionist movement.

Her paintings have been featured in over 100 exhibitions both at home and abroad, including Australia, India, the United States, Germany, France and England. Her source of inspiration is the daily life of the Chakma people and the natural beauty of her birthplace, Rangamati, and focuses on the representation of ethnic minorities in her work.

A selection of her published works can be seen on her website.

== Exhibitions ==
- 2009: Appointment 2009 (group)
- 2010: Journey to Peace (solo)
- 2010: Rooted Creativity-3 (group)
- 2011: Colorful Yunnan (group)
- 2012: 15th Beijing International Art Expo (group)
- 2012: Drawing Exhibition (group)
- 2012: Saju's Grand Group Art Exhibition (group)
- 2012: Dreams-Sowing (solo)
- 2013: Colours Across the Bangla Delta (group)
- 2013: Amader Kotha (group)
- 2014: Life Is Here (solo)
- 2014: Then and Now (group)
- 2015: Life 2 (group)

== Awards ==
- 2023: Ekushey Padak
- 2014: Bangladesh National Film Award for Best Costume Design
- 2008: Olympic Fine Arts Medal, Beijing, China.
- 2006: Best of The show, Museum of Americas, Florida, United States
- 2003: Diploma Award from 2nd International Tashkent Biennale. Uzbekistan
- 2003: Grand Award, Latin American Art Museum, Miami, Florida, United States
- 1999: Honourable Mention Award, Silver Jubilee of Saju Art Gallery, Dhaka, Bangladesh
- 1993–94: Mid-American Arts Alliance Fellowship Award, United States
  - Master Zainul Abedin Memorial Award, Cultural Reporter Association of Bangladesh
- 2003: Best Personalities in Art, by Arabians Fashion beyond imagination, Dhaka
- 2002: National Award, Best Painting, Bangladesh Shilpakala Academy
- 1994: "TOP TEN" Best woman Personalities in Bangladesh, Life Time achievement, Anonna Award
- 1992: 2nd Award on Modern Painting, International Miniature Art Contest, Florida, United States

== Notes/Further reading ==
- Kanak Chanpa Chakma book, published in 2005
