= Mamnun Hasan Emon =

Bangladeshi actor and model

- মামনুন হাসান ইমন
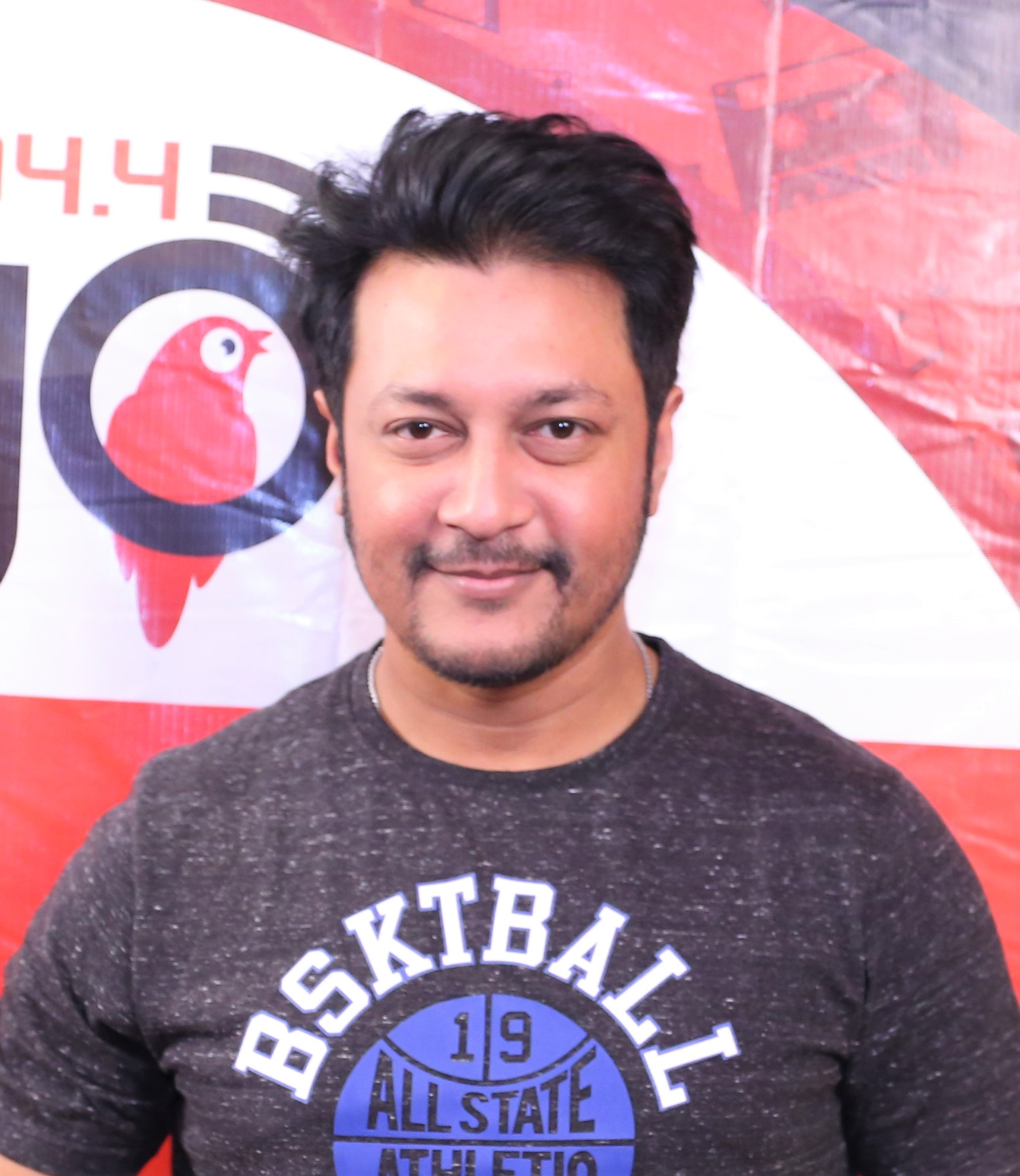
- Emon in 2018
- Born: Mamnun Hasan; May 28, 1983 (age 43); Sultanpur, Palash, Narsingdi
- Occupations: Actor; television presenter; model
- Years active: 2006–present
- Spouse: Aysha Islam (m. 2009)
- Children: 2

Mamnun Hasan Emon (born 28 May 1983) known professionally as Emon, is a Bangladeshi film actor and model who works predominantly in Dhallywood cinema and Bangladeshi television drama. He made his debut with a supporting role in the 2007 film Daruchini Dip starring Riaz, Momo and Bindu. He made his debut as a lead actor in the film Ek Buk Bhalobasha (2008). He is best known for his Banglalink TV commercial opposite Monalisa with Tinni and Nirab.

== Career ==
Emon began his career in Tauquir Ahmed's 2007 film Daruchini Dip. He earned widespread recognition in 2010 for his performance in the film Gohine Shobdo: Dark Resonance. This performance won him several awards at the International Film Festival, South Asian Film Festival, and Silent River Film Festival. He achieved further success with his film Lal Tip: The Red Point.

In 2013, with Bangla Vision, he performed in a dramatic thriller in Qatar titled Valentine, appearing alongside Sarika and Shahnur. It was directed by M-SIB, who showcased Emon and Sarika together for the first time on TV screens.

== Early and personal life ==
Emon was born on 28 May 1983. He lives in Dhaka but his birthplace is Sultanpur village in Palash Upazila, Narsingdi District. He married Aysha Islam on 15 February 2009. The couple have two sons, Samin and Shayan. Mamunun Hasan Emon also collaborated with his wife on a TVC project, marking her debut in acting. This collaboration highlights their professional partnership and showcases their on-screen chemistry. The project has garnered attention for introducing Emon's wife to the entertainment industry.

== Filmography ==
Key
†	Denotes films that have not yet been released

Year	Film	Role	Notes	Ref.
2007	Daruchini Dip	Sonju	Supporting role	
2008	Ek Buk Bhalobasha	Raju / John	Debut in as lead role	
2009	Rastar Chele	Sagor		
2009	Sobaito Bhalobasha Chay	Akash		
2009	Piritir Agun Jole Digun	Emon		
2010	Panch Takar Prem	Emon		
2010	Gohine Shobdo	Niloy		
2010	Mayer Jonno Morte Pari	Emon		
2010	Jemon Jamai Temon Bou	Raj		
2011	Mayer Jonno Pagol	Badsha		
2011	Goriber Bhai	Rana		
2011	Amar Prithibi Tumi	Sumon		
2011	Ongko	Emon		
2011	Garments Konna	Emon		
2012	Lal Tip	Arnob		
2012	Marufer Challenge	Emon		
2013	Eito Bhalobasha	Emon		
2014	Jonakir Alo	Suborno		
2014	Mayer Momota	Sagor		
2014	Jaan	Emon		
2014	Kokhono Bhule Jeo Na	Sajal		
2014	Jane Na E Mon	Rimon		
2014	Swapno Je Tui	Tomal / Tom		
2014	Ek Cup Cha	Himself	Special appearance	
2014	Hridoye 71	Freedom Fighter Mahmud	Based on 1971 Bangladesh Liberation War	
2015	Putro Ekhon Poishawala	Ashish		
2015	Antaranga	Parvez Anwar Akkhor		
2015	Padma Patar Jol	Rizwan Newaz Khan		
2015	Ochena Hridoy	Asif		
2016	Bhul Jodi Hoy	Akash		
2016	Purno Doirgho Prem Kahini 2	Rayan Khan		
2016	Samraat: The King Is Here	Inspector Rabbi	Special appearance	
2017	Porobashinee	Arnob		
2019	Password	Rusho		
2019	Bhalobashar Uttap	Munna		
2019	Akash Mahal	Solaiman		
2019	Begum Jaan	Narcotics Control Officer		
2022	Mafia	Emon		
2022	Lockdown Love Story	Akash		
2022	Agamikal	Shafayet		
2022	Birotto	Dr. Raju		
2022	Kagoj: The Paper	Emon Ahmed		
2024	Kagojer Bou	Arko		
2024	Mayaa	Rahat	Released on Binge	
2025	Direct Attack	Emon		
2026	Moynar Char	Kashem		
TBA	Operation Jackpot †	TBA	Announced	

== Television ==
Year	Drama	Role	Director	Network	Notes	Ref
	Ek Akasher Tara					
2005	Dui Bon		Chayanika Chowdhury	NTV		
2006	Jiboner Onek Rong		Sohanur Rahman			
	Sutropat O Somapti		Tazin Halim			
	Ekti Dhada Abong Amar Great Dadu		Dipankar Dipon	ATN Bangla		
2007	Ghum		Ishtiak Ahmed Rumel		Telefilm	
	SMS		Chayanika Chowdhury			
	Khuje Berai Tare		Saiful Islam Mannu		TV series	
2007	111: A Nelson Number		Noyeem Imtiaz Neyamul	NTV	Mega Serial	
	Ekadoshe Brihospoti		Ashrafur Rahman	Channel i		
	Kusumer Shopno		Chayanika Chowdhury	ATN Bangla		
	Aynay Ochena Mukh		Sotirtho Rahman	ATN Bangla		
	Praner Gohine		Noyeem Imtiaz Neyamul	ATN Bangla		
	42 Minute		Iftakar Chowdhury			
	Late Night Show		Noyeem Imtiaz Neyamul			
	FM Songbed		Chayanika Chowdhury			
	Valukke Shuveccha Tuntuni		Ashutosh Sujon			
	Eso		Chayanika Chowdhury	RTV		
	Danguli		Tonmoy Tansen		Mega Serial	
	Vasa Pelo Bhalobasha		Chayanika Chowdhury			
2013	Valentine					
2014	Lamp Post		Noyeem Imtiaz Neyamul	NTV	Eid Ul Adha 2014	
2015	Valobashay Je Sukh		Shahin Sarkar			
2015	Jasmine		Sajib Ahmed Shanto			
2016	Golper Rong Nil		Jakaria Showkhin	NTV	Valentine's Special	
2016	Prompter		Mohammad Mostafa Kamal Raz	Boishakhi TV		
2016	Na Vulbona Konodin		Himel Ashraf	Channel i	Telefilm	
	Tok Jhal Misty		Noyeem Imtiaz Neyamul	NTV		
2016	Money Bag				Telefilm	
2016	Ucchotoro Baboharik Shikkha		Moinul Wazed Rajib	NTV		
2016	Dustbin		Rana Masud	Channel i		
	Shore O		Ferdous Hasan	NTV		
2016	Bokarai Prem Kore		Nazmul Haque Bappy	NTV		
	Gaan Bondhu		Maksudur Rahman Bishal	NTV		
2016	Pabitro Prem		Nazmul Haque Bappy	NTV		
2016	Selfie		Ferdous Hasan	NTV	Telefilm	
2016	Lal Polasher Mash		Ferdous Hasan Rana			
	Chotushkon		B.U. Shuvo	ATN Bangla		
2016	Ek Ghonta		Adibashi Mizan			
2016	Nil Kolom		Razib Hasan		Eid Natok	
2016	Moddhobiroti		Anjan Aich			
	Shoishobe Koishor		Azad Al Mamun			
	Nirshobdo Bhalobasha					
	Obhimaan		Biplob Hayder	NTV		
	Hirar Gohona		Topu Khan	NTV		
2016	Kakchokkhu Jole		Anjan Aich			
	Hip Hip Hurray			Asian TV		
	Opu Weds Opu		Moinul Wazed Rajib and Shawon Chowdhury			
2016	Premdub		Shakhawat Sobuj	Channel i	Telefilm	
	Niruddesh Bhalobasha		Kazi Saif Ahmed			
	Premi	Partha				
	Prothom Porinoy		Sarder Rokon			
	Black Room		Shoursho Dipto Surjo			
	Naptholine		Rintu Parvez			
	Minu		Anjan Aich			
	Kothopokothon		Noyeem Imtiaz Neyamul	NTV		
	Shomikoron		Fayjunnesa Luna	Channel i	Telefilm	
2016	Moddho Biroti		Anjan Aich			
	Bondhu Bondhu Amar		Anisuzzaman			
	Shunno Saikat E		Minhajul Islam			
	Fire Ashar Golpo		Chayanika Chowdhury	NTV	Telefilm	
2017	Tomay Niye		Nazmul Haque Bappy	NTV		
2017	Dana Mele		Mohammad Mostafa Kamal Raz			
2017	Nil Ghum		Sazzad Sumon	RTV		
2017	Bihongo Balika		Sadek Siddiki	Boishakhi TV		
	Mr. Perfectionist		Rashed Raha	NTV		
	Ghuri Tumi Kar Akash E Uro		Jamal Mallick	RTV		
2017	Good Morning, Good Night		Mainul Rakim	RTV	Pohela Boishak Natok	
2017	Bhalobashar Kache Fera		Shakhawat Manik	NTV		
2017	Life Is Beautiful		Shakhawat Manik			
	Bhalo O Basha		Kajal Arefin Ome			
2017	Kothay?		Kajal Arefin Ome		21 February Special Natok	
	Neel Rong Bristy		M Hasnat Santu			
2017	Otikrom		Sazzad Mamun	Channel i	Telefilm	
	Ovijat		Shahzada Mamun	Channel i	Telefilm	
	Tonatunir Prem		Tuhin Hossain			
	Moner Gohine		Shahriar Rokon	Channel i		
	Akash Bariye Dao		B.U Shuvo	Maasranga TV		
	Ongko		Fayjun Nesa Luna			
	Bhalobashar Kichu Rong		Sharafi Sarkar	ATN Bangla		
	Rater Otithi		Mujibul Haque Khokon			
	Adbhut Majayal		Kazi Saif Ahmed			
	Biday Bhalobasha		Harun Rashid Prince			
	Golpota Sudhu Tomar Amar		Shariful Islam Shamim			
	Rege Gelen To Here Gelen		Mojibul Haque	Channel i		
	Pokkho Bipokkho		Arif Khan	Channel i		
	Meye Manushi		Nahid Babu	Maasranga TV		
2017	Paris er Chithi		Swapan Ahmed	Channel i	Mega Serial	
2017	Kothay Khuje Pai?		Ainun Islam Chanchal	Channel i		
2017	Oviman	Opu	Shakhawat Sobuj	Boishakhi TV	Eid Special Natok	
2017	Baby Seat		Noyeem Imtiaz Neyamul	Channel i		
	Ab E Rowa			Channel i		
2017	Power		Arif Rahman	Channel i	Telefilm	
	Prothom Porinoy		Sanjay Barua			
	Prem O Ekti Ochena Shohor		Shohel Rana			
	Onekei Eka		Murad Parvez			
	Eshechilam		Anjan Aich			
	Divorce		Faysal Rajib			
	Bhalobasha Dujonay		Sheikh Salim	Maasranga TV		
	Dream Sequence		A.N.M. Shahadat Hossain Jewel			
	Palta Hawa		Faisal Rajib	ATN Bangla		
	Target		Rashedul Islam Rashed	Boishakhi TV		
	Mohonio		Saiful Islam Saiful and Arifur Rahman	Maasranga TV	Telefilm	
	Ami Shey O Shokha		Rahat Mahmud	Maasranga TV	Telefilm	
	Prachir		Imraul Rafat			
	Shei Tumi Ei Tumi		Dipu Hazra	Maasranga TV		
	Apon Adhar		Dipu Hazra	Maasranga TV		
	Baazpathor		Syed Shakil	RTV		
	Tomar Namer Roddure		Anjan Aich			
2017	Kusum Purer Kusum Koli		Sadek Siddiki	SA TV	Eid Telefilm	
2017	Mrs. Cook		Sraboni Ferdous	Bangla Vision		
2017	Na Jagotik Na Puran		Mahmud Didar	Channel i	Telefilm	
	Abortomane Bhalobasha			Channel i		
2018	Chobir Manush		Mohammad Mostafa Kamal Raz	RTV		
	Dongshon		Topu Khan	NTV		
	Master Mind		Topu Khan	RTV		
	Ekti Phone Call		Tushar Ahmed and Mahamudul Hasan	RTV		
	Cheat n Love		Tushar Ahmed	RTV		
	Srinkhol		K.M. Nayeem	RTV		
	Gash Foring Er Golpo		Tarek Rahman	RTV		
	Shob Premer Golpe Prem Thakena		Shadhin Fuad			
	Amontron		Shakhawat Manik			
	Theory of Politics		Efthakhar Suvo			
	Briddher Cinema		Shakhawat Manik			
	Nayok Nayika O Villain		Maksudur Rahman Bishal			
2018	Likhe Dilam Jibonta		Shakhawat Manik	RTV		
2018	Ekhane Sagor Nil		Shakhawat Manik	RTV	Telefilm	
	Amar Mon Bhalo Nei		Rafiqullah Selim	Channel i	Telefilm	
2018	Bhul		Ahmed Azim Titu	Channel i	Telefilm	
	Bhul		Ashraful Alam Titu	RTV		
2018	Bhul Manush		Nader Chowdhury	Channel i		
2018	Kach Pokara		Anjan Aich	Channel i	Telefilm	
2018	Nibedon Ei Je!		Shahid Un Nabi	Channel i	Telefilm	
2018	Salute Sir		Kamrul Hasan Shakil	Channel i	Telefilm	
2018	Prem Noy Tar Cheyeo Beshi Kichu		Rajibul Islam Rajib	Channel i	Eid Telefilm	
2018	Babar Buker Ghran		Sazzad Sumon	Channel i	Eid Telefilm	
2018	Harano Bari		Arun Chowdhury	Channel i		
2018	Je Vule Tomare Vule		Tania Ahmed	RTV		
2018	Bela Sheshe		Sayed Shakil	RTV		
	Nodi Chaile Sagor Dibo			Bangla Vision		
	Briddher Manush		Sraboni Ferdous			
2018	Matir Ghran		Harun Rusho	Channel i		
2018	Bhalobasha Tomar Amar		Maksudur Rahman Bishal	Asian TV		
	Amar Bhai		Adibashi Mizan	Asian TV		
	Chutir Fade		Sardar Rokon	RTV		
	Hariye Jawa Bari		Arun Chowdhury	Channel i		
	Ruper Dali		Matia Banu Suku	Channel i		
2018	Ami Xunayed		Mohon Ahmed		Eid Natok	
	Kokhono Kokhono		Mohammad Mostafa Kamal Raz	Channel i		
2018	Dhushor Prem		Jewel Rana			
2018	Tahar Phire Asha		Sarder Rokon			
2018	Diary of Love		Sarder Rokon			
	Ami Divorce Chai		Sanjay Barua	GTV		
2018	Roddure Payechi Tomar Naam		Rajibul Islam Rajib	Channel i	Telefilm	
2018	Dustu Cheler Misty Prem		Mohon Khan	Bangla Vision		
2018	Portrait	Shayan	Md Maksudur Rahman Bishal	NTV	Eid Natok	
2018	Ek Mutho Roddur		Kaushik Sankar Das	NTV	Eid Telefilm	
2018	Ek Fagune		Ferdous Hasan	GTV	Eid Natok	
2018	Chinese Prem Kumar	Shiraj	Anjan Aich		TV mini-series	
	Valobashay Fera		Taju Kamrul			
	Hariye Tomake		Raihan Khan			
	Roudra Chayar Songshar					
	Tumi Je Amar		Sushmoy Sumon			
	Shunno Hridoy		Sheikh Selim			
	Chile Kothar Moyna		Tarik Mohammad Hasan	GTV		
2018	Kach Shomuddro		Maksudur Rahman Bishal	Asian TV		
2018	Love Birds		Rb Pritom			
	Obhishopto Camera		Moyukh Bary	Maasranga TV		
2019	Valobashar Duipith		Azad Al Mamun		Eid Natok	
	Nobo Brindabon		Litu Karim			
	Swapner Uraan		Saiful Alam Shamim	Channel i	Telefilm	
	Hemonter Bristi		Musafir Syed	Channel i	Telefilm	
	Guest Room		Parthib Mamun	Channel i	Telefilm	
	Shadharon Bonam Oshadharon		Mohammad Mostafa Kamal Raz			
2019	In Between		Murad Parvez			
2019	Fera		Animesh Aich	Bangla Vision	Telefilm	
2019	Shongjog Bicchinno		Rajibul Islam Rajib	Channel i	Eid Natok 2019	
2019	CC Camera		Rana Masud	Channel i		
	Bhalobashar Bosobas		Sadek Siddiki	ATN Bangla		
	Hoimontir Dinratri		Tareq Rahman	Channel i		
	Balish Bilash		Ferdous Hasan	Channel i		
	Pita O Premik		Heru Khan	Channel i		
	Amar Adhar Bhubone		Sayed Shakil			
	Mondo Chele		Anjan Aich	RTV		
	Opekkha		Maksudur Rahman Bishal			
	Jol Ronger Manush		Subroto Chakraborty	Channel i	Telefilm	
	Shunno Hridoy		Rasel Alam	Channel i		
2020	Na Bola Kotha		Shah Alam Mondal			
	Clanto Charon					
2021	Katus Kutus Katbadam		Anonno Emon	Maasranga TV		
2021	Kukur Shovab		Rajibul Islam Rajib	Channel i		
2022	Ke Amar		Aniruddho Rasel	Channel i		
2022	Boka Kothakar		Dipu Hazra	Channel i		
2022	Neel Tomar Jonno Kadsi		Mainul Hasan Khokon	Nagorik TV		
2022	Mittha Tumi Shotto Tumi		Razibul Islam Razib	Channel i		
	E Kemon Khela		Manjurul Haque Manju			
2022	Mr. Baki Man		Nurunnobi Emon			
2022	Mohonar Shetu		Arun Chowdhury	Channel i		

== Web series ==
Year	Title	OTT	Character	Co-Artist	Director	Notes
2019	Beauty and The Bullet	Bioscope	Superstar Shayan Khan	Tahsan, Afran Nisho, Momo, Mim,	Animesh Aich	

=== Short film ===
Year	Title	Character	Director	Notes
2017	Ma		Mohammad Mostafa Kamal Raz	
2021	Eida Kopal		Raihan Rafi	

=== Music video ===
Year	Title	Singer	Director	Notes
2019	"Lal Sobuj" (Cricket Song)	Dinat Jahan Munni, Ayub Shahriar, Sabbir Zaman, Ahmad Humayun, Ronty Das, Tasnim Aurin, Arif & Masum	Ziauddin Alam	
2021	"Mayay Bedhecho"	Parna	Anonno Mamun	

== Awards and nominations ==
Year	Award	Category	Film	Result	Ref.
2007	Meril Prothom Alo Awards	Best Model Popular Choices'	Banglalink	Won	
2008	Meril Prothom Alo Awards	Best Film Actor	Ek Buk Bhalobasha	Nominated	
2009	Meril Prothom Alo Awards	Best Film Actor	—N/a	Nominated	
2010	Meril Prothom Alo Awards	Best Film Actor	Gohine Shobdo	Nominated	
2011	Silent River Film Festival	Best Film Actor	Gohine Shobdo	Won	
2011	Diamond World Channel I Best Award	Best Film Actor	Garments Konna	Won	
2012	Meril Prothom Alo Awards	Best Film Actor	Lal Tip	Nominated	
2012	Television Reporters Association of Bangladesh Award	Best Film Actor	Garments Konna	Won	
2012	Television Reporters Association of Bangladesh Award	Best Model	Walton	Won	
2019	India-Bangladesh Film Awards	Best Supporting Actor	Password	Won	
2025	BIFA	Best Breakthrough Performance	Mayaa	Won	
2025	BD'S Most Stylish Award	Stylish Film Actor	Mayaa	Won	
2025	Meril Prothom Alo Awards	Best Film Actor	Mayaa	Won	
