= Shahnewaz Kakoli =

Bangladeshi film, theatre and telefilm director

- শাহনেওয়াজ কাকলী
- Occupation: Filmmaker
- Spouse: Pran Roy (m. 2001)

Shahnewaz Kakoli (also spelled Shahneoyaj Cacoly (Note: Spelling according to New Age and The Daily Star)) is a Bangladeshi film, theatre and telefilm director. She made her debut as a director with the film Uttarer Sur (2012), which was screened in different international film festivals, including Goa International Film Festival, Kolkata International Film Festival (2012), and Third Eye Mumbai Film Festival. The film won 3 Bangladesh National Film Awards.

== Career ==
Before starting feature film direction Kakoli directed several telefilms and theatres. She is also a painter. Kakoli is influenced by Bengali film director Ritwik Ghatak.

In her first big screen film Uttarer Sur, she dealt with life of a singer and her little daughter who sing (and beg) in the street to earn their living.

== Personal life ==
Kakoli married actor Pran Roy on 9 December 2001.

== Works ==
=== Films ===
- Uttarer Sur (2012)
- Nodijon (2015)
- Jolrong

=== Telefilms and drama ===
- Ujan Panthe
- Anek Kartik Ekti Agrahayan
- Hamr Lalu *Rangin Sharee
- Bunon
- Sung Ulipur
- Abong Laal Tip
- Ruposi Tailor's
- Khokon Khokon Dak Pari
- Nissobdo Thatok
- Haat Taan
- Bawla Batas
- Garialer Ujan Bhati
- Golapi Panjabi
- Judhah Chinho
- Bodhudoy
- Doctorer Ashchorjo Bhalobasha
- Trilogy
- Doibad
- Mouth Organ
- Swapno Karigor
- The Kakoly Opera (2015)'
