= Ekjon Shonge Chilo =

Bangladeshi film

- Film poster
- Directed by: Shawkat Jamil
- Screenplay by: Syed Shamsul Haque
- Produced by: Faridur Reza Sagar
- Starring: Riaz; Moushumi; Kazi Hayat
- Production company: Impress Telefilms
- Distributed by: Impress Telefilms
- Release date: 2007
- Country: Bangladesh
- Language: Bengali

Ekjon Shonge Chilo (Bengali: একজন সঙ্গে ছিল) is a 2007 Bangladeshi film starring Riaz, Moushumi and Kazi Hayat. It was produced under the banner of Impress Telefilms.

== Awards ==
At the Bachsas Awards, the film won Best Actress for Moushumi, Best Dialogue for Mujtaba Saud, and Best Story for Syed Shamsul Haque.
