= Jol Rong =

- Film poster
- Directed by: Kabirul Islam Rana
- Screenplay by: Kabirul Islam Rana
- Story by: HM Anamul Haque
- Produced by: Dilwar Hossain Dilu
- Starring: Shahiduzzaman Selim; Elina Shammi; Symon Sadik; Ushno Haque
- Cinematography: Asaduzzaman Majnu
- Edited by: Touhid Hossain Chowdhury
- Music by: Emon Saha
- Production company: Impress Telefilm
- Distributed by: Bangladesh Dragon Films
- Release dates: 8 June 2025 (OTT); 8 August 2025 (In cinemas)
- Country: Bangladesh
- Language: Bengali

Jol Rong (Bengali: জল রং, transl. Watercolour) is a 2025 Bengali-language Bangladeshi non-fiction drama film. It is directed by Kabirul Islam Rana under the banner of Impress Telefilm and with a Bangladesh government grant. The film is based on the story of people going abroad through dishonest means in search of work. The film features Shahiduzzaman Selim, Elina Shammi, Symon Sadik, Ushno Haque, Kayes Arju, Saima Sriti, Shishir Sardar, Farzana Sumi, and others. It is the debut film of Farzana Sumi.

== Cast ==
- Symon Sadik as Alal
- Ushno Haque as Sheoly Mala
- Shahiduzzaman Selim as Adam Bepari
- Elina Shammi as Sitara
- Kayes Arju as Anna
- Saima Sriti as Sumi
- Shishir Sardar as Irfan
- Farzana Sumi as Surma
- Ashish Khondokar as Tewari
- Masum Aziz as Suma's father
- Rashed Mamun Apu as Aynal
- Khaleda Aktar Kolpona
- Joy Raj
- Shimanto

== Production ==
The movie Jol Rong's shooting was started on 9 October 2021 in Hotapara, Gazipur, and the second lot of the movie was shot in Shutkipalli of Cox's Bazar, St. Martin's, and Bandarban.

== Release ==
The movie 'Jol Rong' received clearance from the Censor Board in September 2023 and was scheduled to be released in theaters by the end of 2023, but it was not released. The film was released on 8 June 2025 on the OTT platform iScreen on the 2nd day of Eid al-Adha of 2025. The film was released on 8 August 2025 in theaters.

== Controversy ==
The film received government funding in the 2020-21 fiscal year and received censor clearance in 2023. The film is being released on OTT after four years of production but not released in theaters. The Dhaka Mail published that about this film's release controversy, "The actor Symon told the Dhaka Mail that he didn't know anything about the release of 'Jol Rong'". "I heard that 'Jol Rong' was released on Friday", director Kabirul Islam Rana also told the media that he received the news of the release of 'Jol Rong' from social media. When contacted for details, the director told Dhaka Mail, 'When a movie gets censored, the producer becomes leader. But I think the producer should have sat down with the director and actors at least a month before the release. Because there is a matter of promoting the film. Releasing a film without such promotion is harmful to the film. When attempts were made to contact producer Delwar Hossain Dilu on his mobile phone to discuss the issues, he did not respond. There was no response even after sending a text message.

When Ajker Patrika contacted director Kabirul Islam Rana about the release of Jol Rong, he said that "He did not know anything about the release of Jol Rong". When asked about the release of the trailer of the Jol Rong movie, director Kabirul Islam Rana said, "The producer has an agreement with iScreen. But it will be released on OTT after the release on theaters". At that time, he also said, "There is no way the movie will be released on OTT before the cinema halls".

Director Rana also said to Samakal that "There is a rule to release minimum on 20 theaters as a government grant movie. But I don't think this is just a rule-based release. A director always wants his movie to reach the audience through all means OTT, YouTube, and cinema halls". Producer Dilwar Hossain Dilu told the reporter of Ajkaler Khobor that "I could not inform anyone due to technical reasons. Powerful actors Shahiduzzaman Selim and Ashish Khandaker, who are play one of the main characters in this movie, are also not aware of the release news. Producer Dilu was silent on this too".

According to an unconfirmed source, the dispute arose due to a conflict between the producer and the director, but the actors did not want to comment on it. When Ajker Patrika contacted producer Delwar Hossain Dilu about the release of the movie in theaters, he said that "The movie was released on iScreen on Eid but was later removed". The producer said, "It was initially released on OTT by mistake. The movie was later removed from there. We have an agreement with iScreen. The movie will be shown on iScreen again after its theatrical release".
