= Ghetuputra Komola =

2012 film

- Theatrical release poster
- Directed by: Humayun Ahmed
- Written by: Humayun Ahmed
- Starring: Al-Mamun Al Siyam; Tariq Anam Khan; Jayanta Chattopadhyay; Munmun Ahmed
- Cinematography: Mahfooz-ur-Rahman Khan
- Edited by: Solim Ullah Soli
- Music by: Maqsud Jamil Mintoo; S I Tutul; Emon Saha
- Distributed by: Ashirbad Films
- Release date: 7 September 2012
- Running time: 121 minutes
- Country: Bangladesh
- Languages: Bengali; English

Ghetuputra Komola (Bengali: ঘেটুপুত্র কমলা, Gheṭuputro Kômola, Pleasure Boy Komola) is a 2012 Bangladeshi musical film written and directed by Humayun Ahmed and produced by Impress Telefilm. The film was Ahmed's last film before his death. It received National Film Awards in nine categories, including Best Director, Story, and Screenplay for Ahmed. The film was selected as the Bangladeshi entry for the Best Foreign Language Oscar at the 85th Academy Awards, but it did not make the final shortlist. The central theme of this film is the antisocial pederasty and male child prostitution of the local landlords towards Ghetu artists in the Mymensingh region during the British period. It shows the brutal consequences of male homosexuality and male bisexuality, which was secretly cultivated by the dint of power and in exchange for money, despite being considered paraphilia and prohibited in the society of the time, and also symbolically depicts the inhumane nature of feudalism.

== Plot ==
The film's screenplay was written by Humayun Ahmed, based on the short story "Ekjon Shoukhindar Manush" from his short story collection "Jalkanya" published in 1996. The story takes place 150 years ago, during the colonial era in a village called Jalshuka, in Habibganj. During that time a musical group was created called Ghetugaan where young boys danced in female clothing; those dancers were called "Ghetu". Soon they became famous among people but the landlords wanted them for sexual desires and gradually elite pederasty became recognized in the contemporary local society. The Ghetus used to get hired for the flood season. The story is about a teenage boy who is hired by a colonial era landlord to entertain his sexual desires until the annual flood is over.

The movie starts with a young boy and his family, who are looking for work as they cannot work during the floods. The young boy and his father join a musical group, where the boy (Komola) works as the Ghetu.

The landlord sexually molests the young boy after the first dance performance. This pattern keeps repeating throughout the whole time that the musical group stays there. The landlord's wife becomes insecure after noticing his increasing obsession with Komola. The landlord suggests keeping Komola even after the floods end which angers his wife. She secretly orders her maid to push Komola off the railings on the balcony where he usually likes to walk with his eyes closed.

The maid, after one unsuccessful attempt for days, pushes the boy off one day and he dies. Understanding the matter done by his wife, the landlord warns her and orders her to fire the maid. The landlord pays heavy money to the family of Komola and send them away. The wife of the landlord becomes happy and feel relaxed for now until another Ghetu's coming next year.

Later, this tradition and musical genre eventually disappeared over time.

== Cast ==
- Al-Mamun Al Siyam as Komola/Jahir (deceased)
- Tariq Anam Khan as the landlord Chowdhury Hekmot Ali
- Jayanta Chattopadhyay as Fazlu, Komola's father and troupe leader
- Munmun Ahmed as the landlord's wife
- Agoon as a painter named Shah Alam
- Pran Roy as Gaurango, dance master
- Abdullah Rana as Imam
- Shamima Nazneen as Mayna, the head maid, Komola's killer
- Tamalika Karmakar as Komola's mother
- Pranti
- Masud Akhond as horse handler
- Rahmat Ali as Moura (sweet maker)
- Ehsanur Rahman
- Jewel Rana
- Rousso
- Saleh Sohel
- Shahana Rahman Geeta
- Putul
- Z. H. Sameer
- Prapti
- Kuddus Boyati as the lead singer of the troupe
- Islam Uddin Boyati

== Soundtrack ==
Pleasure Boy Komola

Soundtrack album by Maksud Jamil Mintu
- Recorded: 2012
- Genre: Feature film soundtrack
- Length: 44:27
- Label: Impress Telefilm
- Producer: Faridur Reza Sagar

The film is scored by Maksud Jamil Mintu and several artists have rendered the songs.

No.	Title	Artist	Length
1.	"Baje Bongshi"	Fazlur Rahman Babu
2.	"Saban Aaina Dile Na"	Shafi Mondol
3.	"Sua Urilo"	Fazlur Rahman Babu
4.	"Joler Ghate Baje Bashi"	Fazlur Rahman Babu
5.	"Amar Jomunar Jol Dekhte Kalo"	Fazlur Rahman Babu
6.	"Baje Bongshi"	Shafi Mondol
7.	"Sua Urilo"	Selim Chowdhury

== Awards ==
National Film Awards

- Best Director, Best Story, Best Screenplay – Humayun Ahmed
- Best Child Artist – Mamun
- Best Music Director – Emon Saha
- Best Cinematography – Mahfuzur Rahman Khan
- Best Editing – Solimullah
- Best Costume Design – S.M. Mainuddin
- Best Makeup – Khalilur Rahman

Meril Prothom Alo Awards

- Best Film
- Best Director
- Best Screenplay

== See also ==
- List of submissions to the 85th Academy Awards for Best Foreign Language Film
- List of Bangladeshi submissions for the Academy Award for Best Foreign Language Film
- Bachcha Baazi
