= Third World Independent Film Festival =

The Third World Independent Film Festival celebrates filmmakers worldwide whose topics deal with issues of the third world. The festival promotes awareness of social issues, helps gain a deeper understanding and greater respect for different cultures, and provides a platform for filmmakers to introduce their films to the broadest possible audience.

The first annual Third World Independent Film Festival took place on September 20–25, 2011.

== Mission ==
The festival's mission is to bring light to issues, such as poverty, unemployment, human trafficking, war, and water crisis, that were generally only associated with developing nations. Those who implement the festival believe that with today's global economic collapse, the gap used to separate third world countries from developed nations has narrowed. These issues are now at the forefront of today's news worldwide.
