= Al Mamun Al Siyam =

Bangladeshi film actor (born 1993)

Hasan Ferdous Al Mamun Al Siyam
- হাসান ফেরদৌস আল-মামুন আল-সিয়াম
- Born: Barishal District, Bangladesh
- Occupations: Film actor, Model
- Years active: 2012–present
- Notable work: Ghetu Putro Komola
- Awards: National Film Award (1st time)

Hasan Ferdous Al-Mamun Al Siyam (Bengali: হাসান ফেরদৌস আল-মামুন আল-সিয়াম) is a Bangladeshi film actor, known for the 2012 film Ghetu Putro Komola, which was selected as the Bangladeshi entry for the Best Foreign Language Oscar at the 85th Academy Awards, but it did not make the final shortlist. Mamun is the recipient of several accolades, including National Film Awards in 2012. He has worked in Indian films, predominantly in Hindi. Debuting with Bollywood film Ek villain as Aisha's friend in 2014 he has since then established a career in both Bengali and Hindi film industry.

== Career ==
Mamun started acting debut with a television drama produced by telecommunication operator Airtel Bangladesh. In 2012 he drew a widespread attention through the lead role Ghetuputra in the film Ghetuputra Komola, produced and directed by Humayun Ahmed. His second film is Nishiddho Premer Golpo.

== Filmography ==
Year	Film	Role	Notes
2008	Chandragrohon	Young Kashu	
2012	Ghetuputra Komola	Komola / Jahir	
-	Prem Kahan (formerly Nishiddho Premer Golpo)		unreleased
2014	Ek Villain	Aisha's friend	
2022	Runway 34	Lumin	
2022	Ek Villan returns		Post-production

== Playback ==
- Abujh Bou (2010)
- Pahili Raja (2010)

== Awards ==
Year	Film	Award	Category	Result
2012	Ghetuputra Komola	National Film Awards	Best Child Artist	Won
