= Lal Tip =

- লাল টিপ
- Directed by: Swapan Ahmed
- Story by: Swapan Ahmed
- Produced by: Faridur Reza Sagar; Ibne Hasan Khan; Impress Telefilm Limited; Kazi Enayet Ullah; Banani Films; Montmartre Motion Pictures
- Starring: Emon; Kusum Sikder; ATM Shamsuzzaman; Mishu Sabbir; Daniel Kramer; Gerard Dopardo; Debrah Newman
- Edited by: Raviranjan Mitra
- Music by: Fuad al Muqtadir; Ibrar Tipu; Arfin Rumey; Morris Jar
- Release date: 17 February 2012
- Running time: 123 minutes
- Country: Bangladesh
- Languages: Bengali; French

Lal Tip (The Red Point) is a 2012 romance film directed by Swapan Ahmed and produced by Impress Telefilm Limited and Benani Films. The film stars Emon and Kusum Sikder in lead roles. The film was released worldwide on 17 February 2012.

== Cast ==
- Mamnun Hasan Emon as Arnob
- Kusum Sikder as Nidhi
- Benjamin Dupich as Laurent
- Ana Levis as Leena
- ATM Shamsuzzaman as Dada
- Shahidul Alam Sachchu as Sohel
- Mishu Sabbir
- Daniel Kramer
- Toriqul Islam Tusher
- Deborah Newman
- Natalie Fransasci
- Sohel Khan

== Production ==
The film was produced by Impress Telefilm Limited and Banani Films.

=== Filming ===
Shooting locations included Paris, Bangkok, and Dhaka. Some shots were taken in India. The cast filmed in Bangkok and Cox's Bazar, where Emon and Kusum Sikder also shot a romantic song. 50% of the shots were done in France, and the rest were done in Thailand, Bangladesh, and India.

=== Casting ===
Mamnun Hasan Emon was the first to sign into the film and was under Swapon Ahmed's direction for the second time. Kusum Sikder was signed to play the female lead, as Swapon Ahmed wanted a fresh face for his movie.

== Soundtrack ==
The soundtrack was composed by Fuad al Muqtadir. Two songs, Beshe Jai and Hariye Jawa Sapne, were released with the trailer. The promo video for all the songs was released on 27 December 2011. Samsung organized the film's music launch on 25 December 2011. The music was composed by Fuad al Muqtadir, Ibrar Tipu, and Arefin Rumey. Three-time Academy Awards winner Morris Jar composed one song for the album.

Track listing
No.	Title	Singer(s)	Length
1.	"Veshe Jai"	Upol	4:23
2.	"Hariye Jawa Shopne"	Dilshad Nahar Kona	3:47
3.	"Vola Mon Re"	James	4:46
4.	"Dure Dure Thaka"	Dilshad Nahar Kona, Kazi Shuvo	5:31
5.	"Ai Prothibir"	Syed Abdul Hadi	2:40
6.	"Kothao Chilena Tumi"	Arfin Rumey, Nazmun Munira Nancy	5:35
7.	"Ei Shohore"	Tapash	5:01
8.	"Kothao Chilena Tumi (Reprise)"	Arfin Rumey, Sabrina Porshi	4:29
9.	"Tumi Sei Meye"	Swapon Ahmed	3:52
10.	"Lal Tip"	Ibrar Tipu, Nazmun Munira Nancy	3:27

== Marketing ==
Samsung and Channel i announced their association with Impress Telefilm Limited for their film Lal Tip.

== Release ==
Lal Tip was released worldwide on 17 February 2012. A red carpet premiere of Lal Tip was organised by Impress Telefilm on 15 February 2012.
