= Janowar =

2021 film directed by Raihan Rafi

- Official poster
- Bengali: জানোয়ার
- Directed by: Raihan Rafi
- Written by: Raihan Rafi
- Screenplay by: Raihan Rafi
- Based on: 2020 Gazipur murders
- Produced by: Tamjid Atul
- Starring: Taskeen Rahman; Elina Shammi; Rashed Mamun Apu; Moonmoon Ahmed; Ariya Arittra
- Cinematography: Raju Raj
- Edited by: Simit Roy Antor
- Music by: Khaiyam Sanu Sandhi
- Production company: Turn Communication (Live Technologies)
- Distributed by: Cinematic
- Release date: 14 January 2021
- Running time: 90 minutes
- Country: Bangladesh
- Language: Bengali

Janowar (Bengali: জানোয়ার, lit. 'The Beast') is a 2021 Bangladeshi crime thriller film directed by Raihan Rafi. The film was produced by Tamjid Atul under the banner of Turn Communications for the streaming service Cinematic. The screenplay, written by Rafi, is based on a true story of robbery, gang rape, and murder that occurred in Gazipur on 23 April 2020. The story depicts a police officer investigating the crime. Taskeen Rahman, Rashed Mamun Apu, Elina Shammi, Jamshed Shamim, Farhad Limon, and Munmun Ahmed star in the film. Filming took place over a fortnight in Uttara, Dhaka, in August 2020. After limited promotion, Janowar released on Cinematic on 14 January 2021. It received a generally positive critical reception and became the most watched title on the service in March 2021.

== Plot ==
On 23 April 2020, a police officer arrives at a two-storied residential pink coloured building in a suburb which is the scene of a crime. His fellow police officers brief him on the case. A family including a mother, her two daughters, and son have been found dead in the house. The police officer starts to investigate the crime scene and interview witnesses. The father of the family is away in Malaysia for work. The officer finds three women in the house who start to tell him what has happened. On the night before the birthday of one of the children, Hawarin, a group of robbers broke into the house. The gang started to look for jewellery and other valuables and tied up the family. In an effort to make the robbers leave, the mother cooked a meal for them.

Later in the night, one of the children disclosed that she recognised one of the robbers as a local rickshaw puller. When the robbers discovered this, they tortured, raped, and killed the family to keep their identities a secret, slashing the son's throat on their way out of the property. The police officer discovers the boy's body in the washroom and realises that he has been interviewing the victims of the crime. Shocked, he fears for the safety of his wife and calls her to return home urgently.

== Cast ==
Cast listing is adopted from the end credit scene of Janowar.

The Cops

- Taskeen Rahman as the lead police officer
- Javed Gazi as a police officer
- Arnob as a police officer
- Khan Maruf as a police officer

The Family

- Elina Shammi as the mother
- Moonmoon Ahmed as the oldest daughter of the family
- Ariya Arittra as Hawarin, the youngest daughter of the family
- Md. Tanjid Hossain Akash as the 8-year-old son with a physical disability

The Robbers

- Rashed Mamun Apu as the leader of the robbers
- Jamshed Shamim as a robber
- Farhad Limon as a robber
- Jahangir Alam as a robber
- Mahfuzur Rahman Limon as a robber
- R. A. Rahul as a robber
- Md.Jasim Uddin as a robber

== Production ==
The idea for Janowar was created just after the release of Oxygen, a short film made by the same director. Rafi later directed Poran for the Live Technologies production house, who then signed him for another film with the studio. The screenplay is based on a case of murder and gang rape of four members of a family in Sreepur, Gazipur, which occurred during the COVID-19 pandemic lockdown. Rafi wrote the screenplay based on his visit to the original crime scene at Gazipur, interviewing the eyewitnesses, and meeting and talking to the alleged perpetrators detained in Kashimpur central jail. When choosing the cast, those with experience on the stage were actively looked for. 50 child actors auditioned for the role of Hawarin, the youngest daughter, with Ariya Arittra being chosen. The cast rehearsed for three weeks before the starting of principal photography. The set was designed to look like the actual crime scene.

The entire principal photography was done inside a house in Uttara, over 10 consecutive days in August 2020. Many scenes were filmed in one-take shots. The musical score by Sanu Sandhi was composed after filming was completed. Janowar was announced on the studio's release schedule on 10 September 2020 along with seven other new film projects.

== Release and reception ==
Janowar's promotion was largely limited to hand-drawn posters and a trailer. The film was released on 14 January 2021, on the production company's over-the-top streaming service, Cinematic.

=== Audience viewership ===
424,961 viewers watched the film within first four days of release. By the second week of March 2021, Cinematic's subscribers had watched part of the film 3 million times. Janowar became the most-viewed content on the service on 16 March 2021. While Cinematic does not disclose grosses of their films, filmmaker Raihan Rafi reported to The Business Standard that the film earned three times the cost.

=== Critical response ===
Janowar received a generally positive reception from critics. Aranya Anwar on Prothom Alo praised the film's production and screenplay. In Bangla Movie Database, critic Rahman Moti wrote about Janowar, "(The director) is shown a certain class of people as beasts. A lot of hatred will filled towards them, watching the film. The director has managed to create social reality and awareness through hatred." He gave Janowar an overall 9 out of 10 star rating, praising the film's production, story delivery and each of the actors. Sarika Sabha from the Dhaka Apologue praised Rashed Mamun Apu's acting, sound effects and make-up in the film. She called Janowar "a landmark". Kawsar Md Sayem of United News of Bangladesh praised Ariya Arittra's performance. Sifat Bin Ayub of The Business Standard wrote, "Janowar is not just a film that we can just watch and forget."
