= Airin Sultana =

Bangladeshi actress and model

- আইরিন সুলতানা
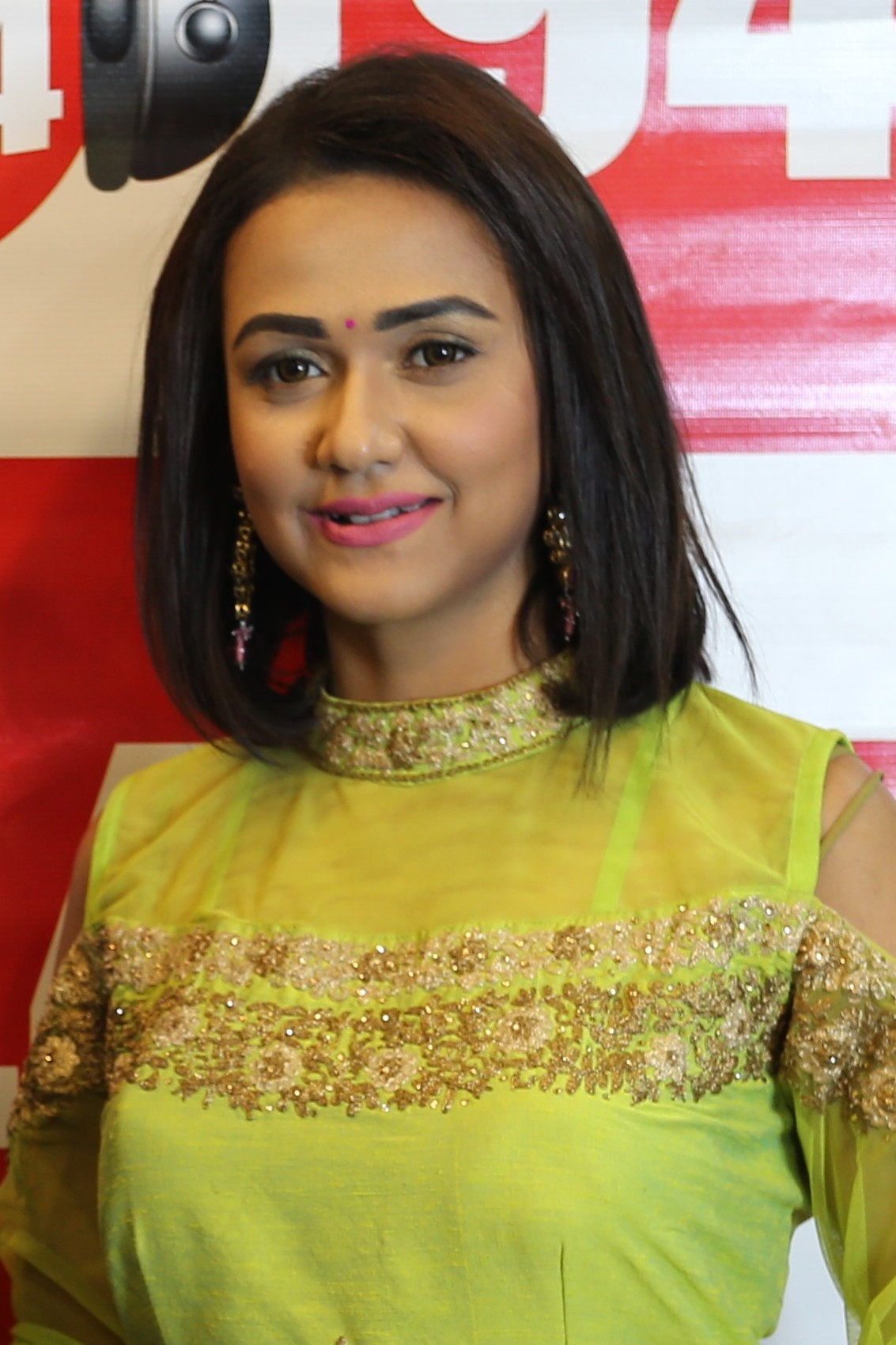
- Airin in 2020
- Born: 27 December 1988 (age 37); Jessore, Bangladesh
- Occupation: Actress
- Years active: 2008–present

Airin Sultana (Bengali: আইরিন সুলতানা) is a Bangladeshi actress and model. She started her media career after winning the Best Smile Award in the 2008 Pantene You Got The Look contest. She began her film career with the film Bhalobasha Zindabad, opposite Arifin Shuvoo and directed by Debashish Biswas, which was released on 8 November 2013.

== Career ==
Her movies include U turn directed by Alvi Ahmed, Cheleti Abol Tabol, Meyeti Pagol Pagol, by Saif Chandan, time Machine directed by Saimon Tarik, Ek Prithibi Prem directed by S A Haque Olike, Mayabini directed by Akash Acharjee, Shesh Kotha directed by Syed Wahiduzzaman Diamond, Akash mahal directed by Delwar Jahan Jhantu, Podmar Prem directed by harun-uz-zaman.

Her first television serial was Manpower by Ashutosh Sujon. Her second television mega serial was Poush Fagyner Pala, directed by Afsana Mimi.

Her debut web series was Trapped, directed by Saikat Nasir. Her second web series was Dhoka, directed by Anonno Mamun. Her first music video was Bou Ane de, singer Kazi Shuvo, directed by Saikat Nasir. Her second music video was Sweety, singer Akash Sen, directed by Anonno Mamun. Her first poetry visual was Bhul Preme kete gece Trish Bosonto, directed by Evan Monowar.

== Filmography ==
Key
†	Denotes films that have not yet been released

Year	Film	Role	Notes	Ref.
2013	Bhalobasha Zindabad	Megha	Debut film	
2014	Time Machine	Juli		
2015	Cheleti Abol Tabol Meyeti Pagol Pagol	Tuni		
2015	U-Turn	Anushka		
2016	Ek Prithibi Prem	Alo		
2017	Mayabini	Priya		
2017	Death of a Poet	Mrityu		
2017	Shesh Kotha	Bani		
2019	Abbas	Herself	Special appearance in "Lal Moroger Jhuti" song	
2019	Akash Mahal	Bina		
2019	Padmar Prem	Padma		
2021	Gontobbyo			
2022	Kagoj: The Paper	Renu		
2024	Dunia	Samira		
TBA	Shivaratri †	Anjali	Debut Indian Bengali film	
TBA	Countdown †	Journalist Mouli	Indian Bengali film	
TBA	Prem Bhalobasha Noy †	Jenny		
TBA	Ei Tumi Shei Tumi †	TBA		

== Web series ==
Year	Title	OTT	Character	Director	Notes
2020	Dhoka			Anonno Mamun	
2021	The Trapped		Suma	Saiket Nasir	

== Drama ==
- Serial Manpower on RTV (Finished) Character: Lead Directed by Ashotosh Sujon Chabial
- Serial: Poush Faguner Pala on ATN Bangla. Directed by Afsana mimi, Krishnochura production
- Single drama: Onuvabe Valobasha. Character: Lead, Directed by A.B. Sohel, Gamsa Multimedia Production House
- Single drama: Valobasha o Ekti kalponic kahini Directed by: Ahmed Sushmoy

== Awards ==
Year	Awards	Category	Film	Result
2013	Binodon-Dhara Performance Award	Best Enlightned Heroine (শ্রেষ্ঠ আলোচিত নায়িকা)	Bhalobasha Zindabad	Won
2013	Bioscope Borsho-sera	Best Film Actress (Debut)	Bhalobasha Zindabad	Won
