= Pran Roy =

Bangladeshi actor

- Born: Bagerhat, Bangladesh
- Education: Fine Arts
- Alma mater: University of Dhaka
- Occupation: Actor
- Years active: 2005–present
- Notable work: Ghetuputra Komola
- Spouse: Shahnewaz Kakoli (m. 2001)
- Awards: Meril-Prothom Alo Awards

Pran Roy is a Bangladeshi actor. He primarily acts in stage plays and television dramas. In 2005, he entered the film industry by acting in the movies Lal Shobuj and Molla Barir Bou.

Notable plays in which he has acted include Chorokabya by Shimul Sarker, Sat Saudagar by Syed Aulad, Komol Bibir Othithishala by Badrul Anam Saud, Protishodh by Moinul Hasan Khokon, Ronger Duniya by Hasan Jahangir, Nongorkhana, Electioner Rong, and Jhulongto Babura, among others.

== Personal life and education ==
Pran Roy was born in Bagerhat, Bangladesh. His father is Jogesh Chandra Roy.

He was a student at the Institute of Fine Arts, University of Dhaka. He married his classmate, playwright and director Shahnewaz Kakoli, on 9 December 2001.

== Filmography ==
=== Films ===
Year	Title	Role	Director	Notes
2005	Lal Shobuj	Kismot	Shahidul Islam Khokon	
2005	Molla Barir Bou	Master	Salahuddin Lavlu	
2006	Ore Sampanwala		Masum Babul	
2007	Doctor Bari		Azizur Rahman	
2009	Jolorong		Shahnewaz Kakoli	Unreleased
2012	Ghetuputra Komola	Dance trainer of the Ghetu troupe	Humayun Ahmed	
2012	Hothat Sedin		Basu Chatterjee	
2014	Jibondhuli		Tanvir Mokammel	
2015	Noy Chhoy		Rafael Ahsan	
2015	Nodijon		Shahnewaz Kakoli	
2015	Eito Prem		Sohel Arman	
2019	Maya - The Lost Mother		Masud Pathik	
2022	Mukhosh			
2022	Bhangon	Sadar	Mirza Sakhawat Hossain	Government grant film
2022	Megh Roddur Khela		Awal Reza	
2022	Payer Chhap		Saiful Islam Mannu	
2023	Radio		Ananyo Mamun	
2023	Ekti Na-Bola Golpo		Pankaj Palit	
2023	Adam		Abu Tawhid Hiron	
2023	Priyotoma	Master	Himel Ashraf	
2024	Rong Dhong		Ahsan Sarwar	
2025	Unveiled		Saiful Islam Mannu	
2025	Saba	Police Officer		

=== Television dramas ===
Year	Title	Role	Director	Notes
2007	Romizer Ayna		Shihab Shaheen	
2021	Digridhari Chandu Mama	Chandu Mama	Irani Biswas	Telefilm on Channel i
2023	Pita Bonam Putro Gong		Sokal Ahmed	Machranga Television serial
2023	Chirokumari Songho		Syed Refat Siddique	Ekushey TV
2024	Protima	Ranjan		

== Awards and nominations ==
=== RTV Star Award ===
Year	Nominated Work	Category	Result	Ref
2019	D-20	Best Supporting Actor in a Serial Drama	Nominated	
