= Munmun Ahmed =

Bangladeshi film and television actress and dancer

- মুনমুন আহমেদ
- Born: 27 December 1966 (age 59)
- Occupations: Dancer, actress
- Spouse: Sujit Mustafa
- Children: 1

Munmun Ahmed (born 27 December 1966) is a Bangladeshi film and television actress and dancer. She specializes in kathak dancing. Besides, she is a regular performer in radio plays for Bangladesh Betar.

== Career ==
Ahmed was born on 27 December 1966. Her first instructor was Azhar Khan at Azimpur Ladies Club. She started taking kathak lessons from Syed Abul Kalam in 1978.

After completing her high school exams in 1987 she went to India. There she studied at the Ram Bharatia Kala Kendra under Ram Mohan Maharaj and Raj Kumar Sharma. In 1989, she became a student of Pandit Birju Maharaj in Delhi Kathak Kendra.

Ahmed runs the dance school, Rewaaz Performing School. She was the choreographer of the dance performance held in 2010 South Asian Games in Dhaka.

== Popular films ==
- Ghetuputra Komola(2012)
- Amar Ache Jol(2008)
- Golapi Ekhon Bilatey (2010)

== Personal life ==
Ahmed is married to singer Sujit Mustafa. Together they have a daughter, Aporajita Mustafa.

== Awards ==
- National Award by Bangladesh Shishu Academy for kathak dance (1980)
- UNESCO Cultural Award (2000)
- NHK Japan Award (2000)
