= Lucy Tripti Gomes =

Bangladeshi actress

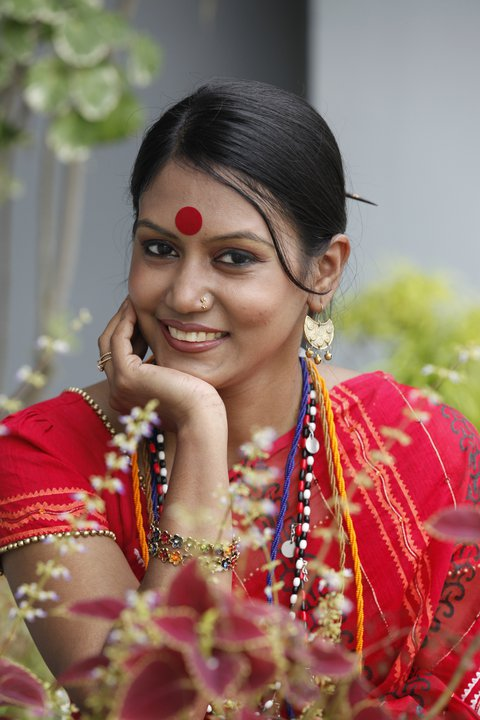
- Born: 26 April
- Education: Jahangirnagar University
- Occupation: Actress
- Years active: 1995-present

Lucy Tripti Gomes is a Bangladeshi stage and film actress. She won Bangladesh National Film Award for Best Supporting Actress for her role in the film Uttarer Sur (2012).

== Early life and background ==
Gomes got involved with the troupe Theatre Centre in 1995. She completed her master's in drama and dramatics from Jahangirnagar University.

== Career ==
Gomes has been working with the theatre troupe Natya Kendra Devin since 2000.

== Works ==
=== Stage ===
- Aroj Charitamrita
- Bichchhu
- Mrito Manusher Chhaya
- Dalim Kumar
- Mayer Mukh
- The Servant of Two Masters
