= Shawkat Jamil =

Bangladeshi film director

- Occupation: Film Director

Shawkat Jamil is a Bangladeshi film director. He is the former president of the Bangladesh Film Directors Association.

== Biography ==
Jamil directed films like Shesh Roksha, Chalbaz, Sobar Upore and Ekjon Shonge Chilo. These films are selected for preservation in Bangladesh Film Archive. Jekhane Tumi Sekhane Ami was his last direction. It was released in 2010.

== Selected filmography ==
- Premer Baji
- Shesh Roksha
- Dorodi Sotan
- Chalbaz
- Sobar Upore
- Ekjon Shonge Chilo
- Jekhane Tumi Sekhane Ami
