= Ghatu (song) =

Folk song of Bengal

Ghatu, Ghetu Gaan, or Ghetu Song is a form of traditional Bengali folk song, prevalent in the eastern part of Bangladesh. The songs were traditionally sung during the monsoon season, though the tradition is on the decline. The festival was mainly held in north-eastern side of Mymensingh and the lower part of Sylhet in Bangladesh.

== History ==
The first day of Bhadro (5th month of the Bengali calendar) started on the eve of Bisharjan of Manasha and was later celebrated on the day of Vijaya Dashami during the monsoon season.

The festival revolves around a teenage boy. The boy dresses in shari and grows out his hair, with the intent of resembling a girl. The very young boys were sexually abused, and that contributed to the decline of this form of music. During the festival he plays the role of pantomime by dancing or otherwise representing the Ghatu song. The Ghatu songs are mainly oriented around Radha Krishna.

== In popular culture ==
- The film Ghetuputra Komola by Humayun Ahmed was based on the life of a young Ghatu singer.
