= Masum Aziz =

Bangladeshi film actor (1952–2022)

- মাসুম আজিজ
- Born: Muhammad Masum Aziz; 1952; Pabna, East Bengal, Pakistan
- Died: 17 October 2022 (aged 70); Dhaka, Bangladesh
- Occupations: Actor, producer
- Years active: 1985–2022
- Notable work: Ghani, Eito Prem, Gahine Shabdo

Muhammad Masum Aziz (1952 – 17 October 2022) was a Bangladeshi stage, film, and television actor. He played in more than four hundred dramas and films since 1985. He won the Bangladesh National Film Award for Best Supporting Actor for his performance in the film Ghani (2011), and in 2022, he was awarded the Ekushey Padak for his contribution to acting by the government of Bangladesh.

== Career ==
While studying at the University of Chittagong, Aziz made his acting debut in theater. In 1985, he debuted in television dramas. He worked at Dhaka Padatik, a theatre troupe, as both actor and director for several years. His last stage direction was "Trial of Surya Sen".

Aziz served as the vice-president of the Director's Guild, a group of television drama directors.

== Works ==
Films

- Momtaz (2005)
- Ghani (2006)
- Rabeya (2008)
- Gohine Shobdo (2010)
- Bostir Chele Kotipati (2010)
- Guerrilla (2011)
- Rupgaowal (2013)
- Rupgawal (2013)
- Lalchor (2015)
- Eito Prem (2015)
- Gariwala (2015)
- Bhola To Jay Na Tare (2016)
- Kopaler Likhon (2017)
- Sanatan Golpo (2018)
- Amra Ekta Cinema Banabo (2019)
- Moddhobitto (2025) Posthumous release
- Jol Rong (2025) Posthumous release

Television dramas

- Ure Jay Bok Pokkhi
- 24 Carat Men
- Tin Geda
- Priyo Protipakkha
- Josna Korechhe Aari
- Sakin Sarisuri
