= Boishakhi Television =

Bangladeshi television channel

Boishakhi Television বৈশাখী টেলিভিশন
- Country: Bangladesh
- Broadcast area: Nationwide
- Headquarters: Mohakhali, Dhaka

Programming
- Language: Bengali
- Picture format: 1080i HDTV (downscaled to 16:9 576i for the SDTV feed)

Ownership
- Owner: Destiny 2000 Limited

History
- Launched: 27 December 2005; 20 years ago

Links
- Website: www.boishakhionline.com

Boishakhi Television (Bengali: বৈশাখী টেলিভিশন; lit. 'Boishakh', referring to the first month of the Bengali calendar), also known as Boishakhi TV, stylized as boishakhi tv, is a Bangladeshi Bengali-language privately owned satellite and cable television channel, headquartered in Mohakhali, Dhaka.

It is owned by Destiny 2000 Group, which acquired the channel from BNS Group of Companies in the late 2000s. It officially commenced transmissions on 27 December 2005. The programming of Boishakhi Television primarily consists of entertainment programming.

== History ==
On 9 September 2004, Boishakhi Television applied for a broadcasting license, which the Bangladesh Telecommunication Regulatory Commission granted them on 31 January 2005, the same day Channel 1 and Banglavision received their licenses. The channel officially began broadcasting on 27 December 2005, being among the other private television channels in Bangladesh, which are Banglavision, RTV, Channel 1, and NTV, to be launched after the closure of Ekushey Television in 2002.

In 2007 or 2008, Destiny 2000 Limited acquired the channel from BNS Group of Companies. However, MNH Bulu, the chairman of the company, accused Destiny for forcibly taking ownership of the channel and threatened to take legal action if they did not return it to them. He filed a lawsuit against the company in 2009 but was not handed back to them.

On 28 July 2010, Boishakhi Television rebranded and changed its logo. The channel broadcast live Shah Rukh Khan's King Khan Live in Dhaka performance organized by Antar Showbiz on 10 December 2010, which also featured Rani Mukherjee, Arjun Rampal, and Isha Koppikar. In May 2011, Boishakhi Television's headquarters in Mohakhali caught on fire, disrupting its transmissions at that time. In November 2011, Boishakhi Television, along with three other Bangladeshi television channels, signed an agreement with UNICEF to air children's programming for one minute.

On the World Environment Day in 2013, Boishakhi Television broadcast Dhakaye Thaki, a documentary showcasing the environmental pollution of Dhaka, the capital of Bangladesh. On the occasion of the month of Ramadan, Boishakhi Television was one of the eight television channels to broadcast the cooking series Pran Premium Ghee Star Cook in July 2014. On 15 February 2017, the Appellate Division of the Supreme Court of Bangladesh granted Destiny 2000's appeal to own Boishakhi Television. On 26 March 2017, in observance of the Bangladeshi independence day, the channel aired the 1997 film Hangor Nodi Grenade, which won the 22nd Bangladesh National Film Awards.

In December 2018, Boishakhi Television began broadcasting using the Bangabandhu-1 satellite. Boishakhi Television became the first Bangladeshi television channel to hire a transgender news reporter on the International Women's Day of 2021. Boishakhi Television began high definition broadcasts on 26 March 2022, coinciding the Bangladeshi independence day.

On 21 November 2026, Bangladesh Police took Boishakhi Television's Deputy Managing Director, Tipu Alam Milon, into custody following a disturbance at the channel's office in Mohakhali, Dhaka. The incident reportedly arose from a dispute between Milon and the head of the online department, HM Nahian. An employee alleged that Nahian brought leaders and activists of Bangladesh Jatiotabadi Chatra Dal and Bangladesh Jatiotabadi Swechhasebak Dal, wings of the ruling Bangladesh Nationalist Party, to the office, where they attempted to take Milon away. Police said they took Milon into custody for his protection amid the disorder and where considering whether to show him detained under a case from the 2024 Anti-Discrimination Student Movement. Mishu is a leader of the Bangladesh Jatiotabadi Swechhasebak Dal.

== Programming ==
=== Non-scripted programming ===
- Anyarakam
- Boishakhi Folk
- Golden Song
- Padmakuri
- Shubho Shokal

=== Drama ===
- Bou Shashuri
- Comedy 420
- Dour The Trendy
- Fourth Class Society
- Jomidar Bari
- Kitchen Politics
- Mohajon
- Party Girl
- Pathorer Kanna
- Sonar Horin
- Taal Betaal
- Village Society

== Controversies ==
In September 2006, Boishakhi suffered a major setback when around forty journalists resigned, as protest against alleged non-payment despite being promised such, therefore accusing the channel of launching without their benefits. The channel's managing director at the time, Mohammad Shahidullah, responded by saying that they "had no right to resign because they were on probation." He also denied the channel hired that many journalists and the statements about their benefit package, while admitting some staff being discharged.

On 10 March 2010, Srabanti, a winner of a dance contest on Boishakhi, Padmakuri, filed a lawsuit against the producers after her Mercantile Bank reward cheque was reportedly rejected twice by the bank. Later in a statement, Boishakhi denied that the producers, Prince and Shohag, were employees of the channel, but said they rather worked on a contractual basis and bought airtime for the program under the channel's previous management.

In February 2021, the chief news editor of Boishakhi, Saiful Islam, and correspondent Kazi Farid were sent death threats in an envelope for allegedly reporting on the irregularities and corruption in the National University. The Dhaka Union of Journalists, of which the victims were members, condemned the incident and called on law enforcement agencies to take immediate action.
