= Ashraf Shishir =

Bangladeshi independent film director, screenwriter and human rights activist

- আশরাফ শিশির
- Born: Md Ashraful Alam; February 1, 1983 (age 42)
- Occupations: Film director, screenwriter,
- Notable work: Gariwala, Amra Ekta Cinema Banabo
- Awards: full list

Md Ashraful Alam (born 1 February 1983) better known as Ashraf Shishir is a Bangladeshi independent film director, screenwriter and human rights activist. He received Bangladesh National Film Awards in 2014 for Gariwala. It has been screened at 65 international film festivals in 22 countries and has earned 24 international awards.

His film Amra Ekta Cinema Banabo is the longest non-experimental film ever made.

== Biography ==
Shishir graduated in information technology and earned his masters' in International human rights law. He is the author of four books.

== Filmography ==
| Year | Film | Director | Writer | Notes | Ref(s) |
|---|---|---|---|---|---|
| 2014 | Gariwala | Yes | Yes | The film feature the story of human spirit, sufferings and simple joy of a single mother and her two young sons. It won national and several international awards. | |
| 2018 | Gopon – The Inner Sound | Yes | Yes | The thriller based drama film tells the story of a flopped filmmaker and a noted female writer. | |
| 2019 | Amra Ekta Cinema Banabo | Yes | Yes | The film is based on love, dreams, politics, revolution and aftermath of Bangladesh Liberation War. It features the deceptive turns, twists of locality, people's struggles and aspirations. | |
| TBA | 570 | Yes | Yes | | |

Note:Films in Bengali-language unless mentioned otherwise.

Music Video

| Year | Title | Singer(s) |
|---|---|---|
| 2017 | Jadukor | Shironamhin |
| 2018 | Bohemiyan | Shironamhin |
| 2020 | Cafeteria Periye | Shironamhin |

== Awards ==
| Year | Film | Notes |
|---|---|---|
| 2014 | Gariwala | Bangladesh National Film Award for Best Short Film, 2014 |
