= Bangladesh National Film Award for Best Short Film =

National Film Award for Best Short Film
- Awarded for: Excellence in cinematic achievements for Bangladeshi cinema
- Sponsored by: Government of Bangladesh
- Location: Dhaka
- Country: Bangladesh
- Presented by: Ministry of Information
- First award: 1982 (1st)
- Final award: 2018 (43rd)
- Currently held by: Golpo Sankhep

Highlights
- First winner: M Hamid, Golpo Sankhep (1982)
- Website: moi.gov.bd

Bangladesh National Award for Best Short Film (Bengali: জাতীয় চলচ্চিত্র পুরস্কার শ্রেষ্ঠ স্বল্পদৈর্ঘ্য চলচ্চিত্র) is one of the categories in the National Film Awards presented annually by the Department of Films and Publications, the organisation set up by Ministry of Information in Bangladesh. It is the highest award for films in Bangladesh. This award goes to the producers of the film and is the only category in a year.
