= Channel 1 (Bangladesh) =

Bangladeshi cable television channel

- Country: Bangladesh
- Broadcast area: Nationwide
- Headquarters: Gulshan, Dhaka

Programming
- Language: Bengali
- Picture format: 2160p UHD TV

Ownership
- Owner: One Entertainment Limited
- Key people: Giasuddin Al Mamun (managing director)

History
- Founded: 1 June 2005; 21 years ago
- Launched: 24 January 2006; 20 years ago (original); 27 April 2026; 6 months ago (relaunch)
- Founder: Giasuddin Al Mamun
- Closed: 27 April 2010; 16 years ago (original)

Links
- Website: https://channelone.news/

Availability

Streaming media
- Jagobd: https://www.jagobd.com/channel1

Channel 1 (Bengali: চ্যানেল ওয়ান) is a Bangladeshi Bengali-language satellite and cable news-oriented television channel owned by One Entertainment Limited, a sister concern of One Group. It was launched on 24 January 2006 and originally broadcast as a mixed entertainment channel airing programming targeted towards all ages. The channel was shut down by the BTRC after being accused of illegal activity, but resumed transmissions as a news-oriented channel exactly sixteen years later. Channel 1 is headquartered in the Uday Tower situated in Gulshan, Dhaka. Giasuddin Al Mamun is the managing director of the channel.

== History ==
=== 2006–2010: Original run ===
Channel 1 applied for a broadcasting license on 5 January 2005, which the Bangladesh Telecommunication Regulatory Commission granted it on 31 January of that year. Its frequency was also allocated in the process. It was founded on 1 June 2005 by Giasuddin Al Mamun, who is a close associate of then acting chairman of the Bangladesh Nationalist Party, Tarique Rahman, although Mamun had stated the channel had no links to him or the coalition government ruling Bangladesh at the time and that the programming of the channel would be non-partisan.

Channel 1 began test broadcasts on 17 January 2006. A press conference was told by the authorities of the channel that it was set to be inaugurated by President Iajuddin Ahmed on 24 January 2006 and immediately broadcast in Africa, the rest of Asia, northeastern Australia, Eastern Europe, and the Middle East besides Bangladesh. Its authorities also made efforts for the channel to be available in North America and the United Kingdom. Channel 1 was officially launched afterward on 24 January, with the telefilm Shuronjona being aired on the occasion. The channel was one of the media partners of the 3rd AIUB Debate Week 2008 held in May of that year.

On 22 June 2009, as it was being accused of evading due payment of over 100,000 USD in four months, Singapore's Singtel shut Channel 1's satellite broadcasts down, although the company's authorities claimed that the broadcasts of the channel were suspended due to technical difficulties. It resumed broadcasts the following day after the channel signed an agreement with Singtel regarding the payment issue. It was the media partner of Horlicks Future Force 2009 held in September of that year, whose owners provided all of the three of the winners with desktop computers.

==== Closure ====
In 2007, One Entertainment secured a loan from Prime Bank, pledging the station's broadcasting equipment as collateral. In 2008, the bank called in the loan and, when it was not repaid, sold the equipment at auction to People's Entertainment Ltd. Channel 1 continued operating, with what the Bangladesh Telecommunication Regulatory Commission found was rented broadcasting equipment, which is a violation of Bangladesh telecommunications law. Consequently, the BTRC shut down the channel on 27 April 2010 at about 18:40 (BST). The last program broadcast was its evening news bulletin. The license of Channel 1 was revoked by the government later on.

=== 2026–present: Relaunch ===
Shortly after the fall of prime minister Sheikh Hasina's government, on 8 August 2024, Dhaka Reporters Unity demanded immediate reinstatement of all unjustly closed media outlets in Bangladesh, including Channel 1. On 23 January 2025, Channel 1 was granted the ability to file an appeal against the High Court order which shut the channel down, paving its way to return to the air. After a hearing on the matter, the Appellate Division cleared the way for Channel 1 to resume broadcasts on 24 February 2025. The channel was relaunched as a news-oriented television channel on 27 April 2026 at 18:57 (BST), exactly sixteen years after it was shut down.

== Programming ==
=== As a mixed entertainment channel (2006–2010) ===
- Baker Pothe
- Bioscope
- Cine Tune
- Chobial Utsab
- Dash Diner Ghotona
- Ganer Khata
- Gent's Tailor
- Gorbhodharini
- Ghugur Basha
- Kalkotha
- Kancher Putul
- Kanone Kusum Koli
- Mayur Bahan
- Mot Motantor
- No Question No Answer
- Nongrar
- Oishi
- Rupantorer Golpo
- Sanjbela
- Shandhikhon
- Shomoyer Shad
- Suprovat
- Taxi Driver
- The One

== See also ==
- List of television stations in Bangladesh
