= Khalid Mahmood Mithu =

Bangladeshi film director and painter

- Born: 1960; Dhaka, Bangladesh
- Died: March 7, 2016 (aged 55–56); Dhaka, Bangladesh
- Resting place: Banani Graveyard, Dhaka
- Education: Master of Fine Arts
- Alma mater: University of Dhaka
- Occupation: Film director
- Spouse: Kanak Chanpa Chakma

Khalid Mahmood Mithu (1960 – March 7, 2016) was a Bangladeshi film director and painter. He won Bangladesh National Film Award for Best Director for his direction of the film Gohine Shobdo (2010).

== Background and career ==
Mithu was born in Dhaka in 1960. His mother, Begum Momtaz Hossain Mithu, was a scriptwriter. He was the nephew of the film director Alamgir Kabir.

Mithu completed his Master of Fine Arts (MFA) degree from Faculty of Fine Arts, University of Dhaka in 1986. He directed his play, Dhusor Album, in 1993. In 2010, he directed the film, Gohine Shobdo, which earned him the national film award. His second film, Jonakir Alo, was selected as the Bangladeshi entry for the Academy Award for Best Foreign Language Film in 2014, but was not nominated.

Mithu was also a painter and by 2004, his work had been featured in 11 solo exhibitions.

== Personal life ==
Mithu was married to painter Kanak Chanpa Chakma and together they had one son, Arjo Srestha and one daughter, Shiropa Purna.

Mithu died when a road side tree fell on top of the rickshaw he was travelling in on March 7, 2016, in Dhanmondi Thana, Dhaka.

== Works ==
- Gohine Shobdo (2010)
- Jonakir Alo (2014)
