= Uttarer Sur =

Bangladeshi film

- Uttarer Sur poster
- Directed by: Shahnewaz Kakoli
- Written by: Shahnewaz Kakoli
- Screenplay by: Shahnewaz Kakoli
- Produced by: The Impress Telefilm
- Starring: Utpal, Lucy, Meghla
- Release date: 14 April 2012
- Country: Bangladesh
- Language: Bengali

Uttarer Sur is a 2012 Bangladeshi Bengali film written and directed by Shahnewaz Kakoli. The film was produced by Impress Telefilm.

== Plot ==
The story of the film revolves around the life of a singer and her little daughter who sing (and beg) in the street to earn their living. The film shows their everyday experiences.

== Cast ==
- Utpal
- Lucy
- Meghla

== Screening ==
The film critically acclaimed and got huge audience response in Bangladesh. The film has been screened in different international film festivals like– Goa International Film Festival, Kolkata International Film Festival (2012), Third Eye Mumbai Film Festival (in Mumbai).

== See also ==
- Monpura
