= 25th Bachsas Awards =

Bangladeshi film awards ceremony in 2004

- Awarded for: outstanding performers of the silver screen, small screen, music, dance and theatre in 2003
- Awarded by: Bangladesh Cholochitra Sangbadik Samity (Bangladesh Cine-Journalists' Association)
- Presented by: Bangladesh Cholochitra Sangbadik Samity (Bangladesh Cine-Journalists' Association)
- Announced on: 2004
- Presented on: 26 June 2004
- Site: Winter Garden of Hotel Sheraton, Dhaka, Bangladesh
- Hosted by: Debashish Biswas

Highlights
- Best Film: Adhiar
- Best Television film: Strir Potro
- Best Actor: Ferdous Ahmed (Bou Shashurir Juddha)
- Best Actress: Shabnur (Bou Shashurir Juddha)

The 25th Bachsas Awards were given by the Bangladesh Cholochitra Sangbadik Samity (Bangladesh Cine-Journalists' Association) to outstanding performers in film, television, music, dance, and theatre in 2003. The awards were introduced in 1972 to encourage the fledgling film industry of the country.

== List of winners ==
=== Lifetime Achievement Awards ===
- Film – Subhash Dutta
- Music – Abdul Jabbar and Apel Mahmud

=== Honorary awards ===
- Aziz Misir Critic Award – Dramatist Arun Chowdhury
- Honorary Award – Singer Mitali Mukherjee

=== Film ===
Name of Awards	Winner(s)	Film
Best Film	Saidul Anam Tutul	Adhiar
Best Director	Saidul Anam Tutul	Adhiar
Best Actor	Ferdous Ahmed	Bou Shashurir Juddha
Best Actress	Shabnur	Bou Shashurir Juddha
Best Supporting Actor	Nayok Raj Razzak	Kokhono Megh Kokhono Brishti
Best Supporting Actress	Bobita	Hason Raja
Best Music Director	Emon Saha	Kokhono Megh Kokhono Brishti
Best Lyrics	Gazi Mazharul Anwar	Kokhono Megh Kokhono Brishti
Best Male Playback Singer	Monir Khan	
Best Female Playback Singer	Baby Nazneen	
Best Story	Rabeya Khatun	Kokhono Megh Kokhono Brishti
Best Dialogue	Momtazuddin Ahmed	Hason Raja
Best Screenplay	Saidul Anam Tutul	Adhiar
Best Art Direction	Saidul Anam Tutul	Adhiar
Best Editing	Saidul Anam Tutul	Adhiar
Best Cameraman	Saidul Anam Tutul	Adhiar
Special Critics Award	Raisul Islam Asad	Lalsalu

=== Telefilm ===
Name of Awards	Winner(s)	Telefilm
Best Telefilm		Strir Potro
Best Director	Mustafa Manwar	Strir Potro
Best Actor	Ahmed Rubel	Lee
Best Actress	Golam Farida Chhonda	Strir Potro

=== Drama serial ===
Name of Awards	Winner(s)	Drama Serial
Best Film		Ronger Manush
Best Dramatist	Selim Al Din and Masum Reza	Ronger Manush
Best Director	Salauddin Lavlu	Ronger Manush
Best Cinematography	Salauddin Lavlu	Ronger Manush
Best Actor	A.T.M. Shamsuzzaman	Ronger Manush
Best Actress	Shomi Kaiser	Sharborno Theatre
Best Supporting Actor	A.K.M. Hasan and Pran	Ronger Manush
Best Supporting Actress	Wahida Mollick Jolly	Ronger Manush

=== Drama ===
Name of Awards	Winner(s)	Drama
Best Film		Dui Kamrar Shangshar
Best Dramatist	Mohon Khan	Thaka Nathakar Majhkhaney
Best Director	Sajjad Hossain Dodul	Lobh
Best Actor	Mahfuz Ahmed	Thaka Nathakar Majhkhaney
Best Actress	Rumana Rashid Ishita; Tazin Ahmed	Thaka Nathakar Majhkhaney; Kothar Kotha
Best Supporting Actor	Jamal Uddin Hossain	Digonte Digholi
Best Supporting Actress	Afroza Banu	Digonte Digholi

=== Television program ===
- Best Anchor – Hanif Sanket
- Best Magazine Show (Entertainment) – Ittyadi
- Best Talk Show (Educational) – Tritiyo Matra

=== Theatre ===
- Best Production – Trino Porney Shal Monjori
- Best Playwright – Dr Syed Manzurul Islam
- Best Set-design – Mustafa Manwar
- Best Theatre Group – Loko Natyadal Shiddheshwari
- Best Actress – Tropa Majumder
- Best Actor – SK Bokhari

=== Music ===
- Best Male Singer – Asif Akbar
- Best Female Singer – Dolly Shayantoni
- Best Band – Hasan's Shadhinota
- Best Male Vocal – Ayub Bachchu
- Best Female Vocal – Tishma
