= 15th Meril-Prothom Alo Awards =

2013 Bangladeshi TV and film awards

15th Meril Prothom Alo Awards
- Date: 26 April 2013
- Site: Hall of Fame Theatre, Bangabandhu International Conference Center, Dhaka, Bangladesh
- Hosted by: Rumana Malik Munmun, Mosharraf Karim, & Chanchal Chowdhury
- Preshow hosts: Rumana Malik Munmun
- Produced by: Transcom Group, Square Toiletries
- Directed by: Kabir Bakul

Highlights
- Best Picture: Ghetuputra Komola
- Most awards: Ghetuputra Komola (5)
- Most nominations: Ghetuputra Komola (5)

Television coverage
- Network: Maasranga Television
- Duration: 1 hours, 12 minutes

The 15th Meril Prothom Alo Awards ceremony, presented by Prothom Alo took place on 26 April 2013, at the Bangabandhu International Conference Center in Dhaka, Bangladesh as a part of the 2012–13 film awards season.

== Facts and figures ==
This was the 15th instalment of the Meril Prothom Alo Awards. Ghetuputra Komola got the best film awards along with 4 other awards Critics Choice best director, best film actor, best film actress, and a special award. This was the last directed film by popular novelist Humayun Ahmed. He was awarded as the best film director for this film. Nazmun Munira Nancy got the award in the best female singer category for the fourth time in a row in 2009.

== Winners and nominations ==
A total of 14 awards were given at the ceremony. Following is the list of the winners.

=== Lifetime Achievement Award – 2013 ===
- Prominent singer Ramkanai Das

=== Public Choice Awards – 2012 ===
Best Film Actor	Best Film Actress
Shakib Khan – Don Number One; Ananta Jalil – Most Welcome; Shahiduzzaman Selim – Chorabali; Ferdous Ahmed – Hothat Sedin	Joya Ahsan – Chorabali and Kusum Sikder – Lal Tip (Tie); Afiea Nusrat Barsha – Most Welcome; Apu Biswas – Ek Takar Denmohor
Best TV Actor	Best TV Actress
Zahid Hasan – Arman Bhai Honeymoone; Chanchal Chowdhury – Olospur; Mosharraf Karim – Radio Chocolate; Tahsan – Monsuba Junction	Nusrat Imroz Tisha – Long March; Joya Ahsan – Amader Golpo; Sumaiya Shimu – Radio Chocolate; Bidya Sinha Saha Mim – Kick Off
Best Singer (Male)	Best Singer (Female)
Habib Wahid – Shadhin; Arfin Rumey – Tumi Amar; Bappa Mazumder – Beche Thak Sobuj; Shahid – Ek Jibon	Nazmun Munira Nancy – Bhalobasi Tomay; Dilshad Nahar Kona – Utola Mon; Kazi Krishokoli Islam – Bonophool; Sabrina Porshi – Porshi-2

=== Critics Choice Awards – 2012 ===
Best Film	Best Film Director
Faridur Reza Sagar (Impress Telefilm Limited) – Ghetuputra Komola; Faridur Reza Sagar (Impress Telefilm Limited) – Pita - The Father; Faridur Reza Sagar (Impress Telefilm Limited) – Uttarer Sur	Humayun Ahmed – Ghetuputra Komola; Masud Akhond – Pita - The Father; Redoan Rony – Chorabali
Best Film Actor	Best Film Actress
Tariq Anam Khan – Ghetuputra Komola; Mamun – Ghetuputra Komola; Masud Akhond – Pita - The Father	Shamima Nazneen – Ghetuputra Komola; Jannatul Ferdoush Peya – – Chorabali; Meghla – Uttarer Sur
Best Playwright	Best TV Director
Azad Abul Kalam – Sobuj Velvet; Animesh Aich – Noytar Songbad; Shibobroto Barman – Khela Khela Sarabela	Animesh Aich – Noytar Songbad; Abu Raihan Jewel – Sobuj Velvet; Hasan Morshed – Jorda Jamal
Best TV Actor	Best TV Actress
Mosharraf Karim – Jorda Jamal; Azad Abul Kalam – Sobuj Velvet; Sayeed Babu – Khela Khela Sarabela	Tarin Ahmed – Sobuj Velvet; Joya Ahsan – Amader Golpo; Laila Hasan – Noytar Songbad

=== Special Awards – 2012 ===
- Mamun for Ghetuputra Komola and Meghla for Uttarer Sur

== Host and Jury Board ==
This program was anchored initially by Rumana Malik Munmun. Chanchal Chowdhury and Mosharraf Karim later host the event. The members of Jury Board for television critics were Mamunur Rashid, Tariq Anam Khan, Wahida Mollick Jolly, Zahidur Rahman Anjan and Gaosul Alam Shaon.

== Presenters and performers ==
=== Presenters ===
Presenter(s)	Role
Ferdausi Rahman, Anjan Chowdhury & Matiur Rahman	Presented Lifetime Achievement Award
Sarah Begum Kobori & Saidul Anam Tutul	Presented Critics' Award for Film
Salauddin Lavlu & Rokeya Rafiq Baby	Presented Critics' Choice Award for Best Film
Parveen Sultana Diti & Riaz	Presented Critics' Choice Award for Best Film Actress
Alamgir & Anjana Sultana	Presented Critics' Choice Award for Best Film Actor
Nima Rahman & Giasuddin Selim	Presented Special Critics' Choice Awards for Film
Runa Laila & Azizul Hakim	Presented Critics' Choice Award for Best Playwright
Dilara Zaman & Mostofa Sarwar Farooki	Presented Critics' Choice Award for Best TV Director
Ramendu Majumdar & Munmun Ahmed	Presented Critics' Choice Award for Best TV Actress
Masud Ali Khan & Rosy Siddique	Presented Critics' Choice Award for Best TV Actor
Syed Abdul Hadi & Aditi Mohsin	Presented Public Choice Award for Best Singer (Female)
Ayub Bachchu & Munira Yusuf Memi	Presented Public Choice Award for Best Singer (Male)
Misha Sawdagor & Nipun Akter	Presented Public Choice Award for Best Film Actress
Jewel Aich	Presented Public Choice Award for Best Film Actor
Pijush Bandopadhay & Rumana Rashid Ishita	Presented Public Choice Award for Best TV Actress
Aupee Karim	Presented Public Choice Award for Best TV Actor

=== Performers ===
Performer(s)	Performance on
Dance Troup	Dance performance
Ananta Jalil Afiea Nusrat Barsha, Mosharraf Karim, Chanchal Chowdhury, Khaleda Akter Kolpona	Digital Package Film – Duti Mon Ekti Kotha
Mahi-Bappy, Shokh-Nisho, Shuvoo-Mim and Tanjil & his troupe	Dance on Combo of Gobhire, Tomake Chai Ami Aro Kache, and Ore o Banshiwala
Shaju Khadem, Majnun Mijan, Tusher Khan and others	Dance on Ganjam Style
Shakib Khan & Joya Ahsan	Dance on Ami Tomar Hote Chai
Ananta Jalil & Afiea Nusrat Barsha	Dance on Dhakar Pola, and Eshona Eshona

== See also ==
- National Film Awards (Bangladesh)
- Ifad Film Club Award
- Babisas Award
