= 34th Bachsas Awards =

Bangladeshi film awards ceremony in 2013

- Awarded for: outstanding performers of the silver screen, small screen, music, dance and theatre in 2012
- Awarded by: Bangladesh Cine-Journalists' Association
- Presented by: Bangladesh Cine-Journalists' Association
- Announced on: September 8, 2013
- Presented on: October 10, 2013
- Site: Indoor Stadium, Mirpur, Dhaka, Bangladesh

Highlights
- Best Film: Runway
- Best Actor: Masud Akhond (Pita)
- Best Actress: Bobita (Khodar Pore Ma)

The 34th Bachsas Awards were given by the Bangladesh Cholochitra Sangbadik Samity (Bangladesh Cine-Journalists' Association) to outstanding performers of the silver screen, small screen, music, dance, and theatre in 2012. The awards were introduced in 1972 to encourage the fledgling film industry of the country.

== List of winners ==
=== Film ===
Name of Awards	Winner(s)	Film
Best Film	Catherine Masud	Runway
Best Director	Tareque Masud	Runway
Best Actor	Masud Akhond	Pita
Best Actress	Bobita	Khodar Pore Ma
Best Supporting Actor	Amit Hasan	Bhalobasar Rong
Best Supporting Actress	Jannatul Ferdoush Peya	Chorabali
Best Music Director	Ali Akram Shuvo	Khodar Pore Ma
Best Lyrics	Munshi Wadud	Raja Surja Khan (Phooler Moto Ekta Jibon)
Best Male Playback Singer	S.I. Tutul	Jiboneo Tumi Moroneo Tumi (Tomar Jonne Prithibi)
Best Female Playback Singer	Runa Laila	Raja Surja Khan (Phooler Moto Ekta Jibon)
Best Story	Redoan Rony	Chorabali
Best Dialogue	Abdullah Johir Babu	Bhalobasar Rong
Best Cinematography	Tareque Masud and Catherine Masud	Runway
Best Screenplay	Mishuk Munier	Runway
Best Art Direction	Shohid Hasan Mithu	Runway
Best Editing	Catherine Masud	Runway
Best Sound Recording	Mashrur Rahman	Runway
