= Meril-Prothom Alo Critics Choice Award for Best Film =

Annual film award by the Meril-Prothom Alo

Meril-Prothom Alo Critics Award for Best Film
- Awarded for: Best Film of the Year
- Country: Bangladesh
- Presented by: Meril-Prothom Alo
- First award: Adhiar (2003, (for films released during the 2003)
- Most recent winner: Komola Rocket (2018)

Meril-Prothom Alo Critics Award for Best Film is an award presented annually by the Meril-Prothom Alo since 2003, a part of Meril-Prothom Alo Awards.

== Winners and nominees ==
indicates the winner

=== 2000s ===
Year	Film	Studio(s)	Ref.
2003 (6th)	Adhiar	The Government of Bangladesh	
2004 (7th)	Shankhonad	Aangik Communications	
2005 (8th)	Hajar Bachhor Dhore	Shuchanda Chalachitra	
2006 (9th)	Ayna	Impress Telefilm Limited - Ebne Hasan Khan & Faridur Reza Sagar	
2007 (10th)	Swopnodanay	Impress Telefilm Limited - Ebne Hasan Khan & Faridur Reza Sagar	
2008 (11th)	Chandragrohon	Azom Faruk	
2008 (11th)	Akash Chhoa Bhalobasa	BFDC - Vision	
2008 (11th)	Amar Ache Jol	Impress Telefilm Limited - Faridur Reza Sagar	
2009 (12th)	Third Person Singular Number	Impress Telefilm Limited - Faridur Reza Sagar	
2009 (12th)	Gangajatra	Impress Telefilm Limited - Faridur Reza Sagar	
2009 (12th)	Monpura	Maasranga Films - Anjan Chowdhury Pintu	

=== 2010s ===
Year	Film	Studio(s)	Ref.
2010 (13th)	Runway	Zingo Films - Catherine Masud	
2011 (14th)	Guerrilla	Esha Yousuff	
2011 (14th)	Amar Bondhu Rashed	Impress Telefilm Limited - Faridur Reza Sagar	
2012 (15th)	Uttarer Sur	Impress Telefilm Limited - Faridur Reza Sagar	
2012 (15th)	Ghetuputra Komola	Impress Telefilm Limited - Faridur Reza Sagar	
2012 (15th)	Pita	Impress Telefilm Limited - Faridur Reza Sagar	
2013 (16th)	Mrittika Maya	Impress Telefilm Limited - Gazi Rakaet, Faridur Reza Sagar	
2014 (17th)	Brihonnola	Film Hawkar	
2014 (17th)	Ant Story	Chabial	
2014 (17th)	Meghmallar	Abul Khair	
2015 (18th)	Chuye Dile Mon	Chitra Limited, Monforing Limited - Asiatic Ddhoni	
2015 (18th)	Anil Bagchir Ekdin	Bengal Creations	
2015 (18th)	Zero Degree	PlayHouse – Mahfuz Ahmed	
2016 (19th)	Oggatonama	Impress Telefilm Limited – Faridur Reza Sagar	
2016 (19th)	Aynabaji	Content Matters, Half Stop Down – Gousul Alam, Mahjabin Reza, Esha Yousuf, Asaduzzaman Sokal, Mohammad Younus Bin Faruq, Md. Mahedi Hasan	
2016 (19th)	Shankhachil	Impress Telefilm Limited, NIdeas Creations & Productions – Prasenjit Chatterjee, Faridur Reza Sagar, Mou Raychowdhury, Habibur Rahman Khan	
2017 (20th)	The Cage	Impress Telefilm Limited – Faridur Reza Sagar	
2017 (20th)	No Bed of Roses	Jaaz Multimedia, Irrfan Khan Films, Eskay Movies – Abdul Aziz, Irrfan Khan, Ashok Dhanuka, Himanshu Dhanuka	
2017 (20th)	Haldaa	Tiger Media Limited – H.M. Ibrahim	
2018 (21st)	Komola Rocket	Impress Telefilm Limited – Faridur Reza Sagar	
2018 (21st)	Debi	C for Cinema – Jaya Ahsan	
2018 (21st)	Swapnajaal	Bengal Creations – Abul Khayer	
