= Daag (2022 film) =

2021 film directed by Sanjoy Somadder

- Movie poster
- দাগ
- Directed by: Sanjoy Somadder
- Screenplay by: Kallol Kabir
- Story by: Mohammed Abu Rajin
- Produced by: Redoan Rony
- Starring: Mosharraf Karim; Tahiya Tazeen Khan Aisha
- Cinematography: Ritu Raj
- Edited by: Simit Ray Antor
- Production company: Dipjoy Creations
- Distributed by: Chorki
- Release date: 10 November 2022
- Running time: 1 hour 20 minutes
- Country: Bangladesh
- Language: Bengali

Daag (Bengali: দাগ) is a 2022 Bangladeshi Social film directed by Sanjoy Somadder. The film stars Mosharraf Karim and Tahiya Tazeen Khan Aisha in lead roles.

== Cast ==
- Mosharraf Karim as Alamgir
- Kazi Anisul Haque Borun as inspector
- Tahiya Tazeen Khan Aisha as mother
- Nishat Priom
- Somu Chowdhury
- Shilpi Sarkar Apu
- Naresh Bhuiyan
- Fakhrul Bashar Masum
- Mili Bashar

== Release ==
The film has been released digitally on Chorki on 10 November 2022.
