= Selim Al Deen Muktamanch =

Open-air theatre in Bangladesh

- সেলিম আল দীন মুক্তমঞ্চ
- Muktamanch
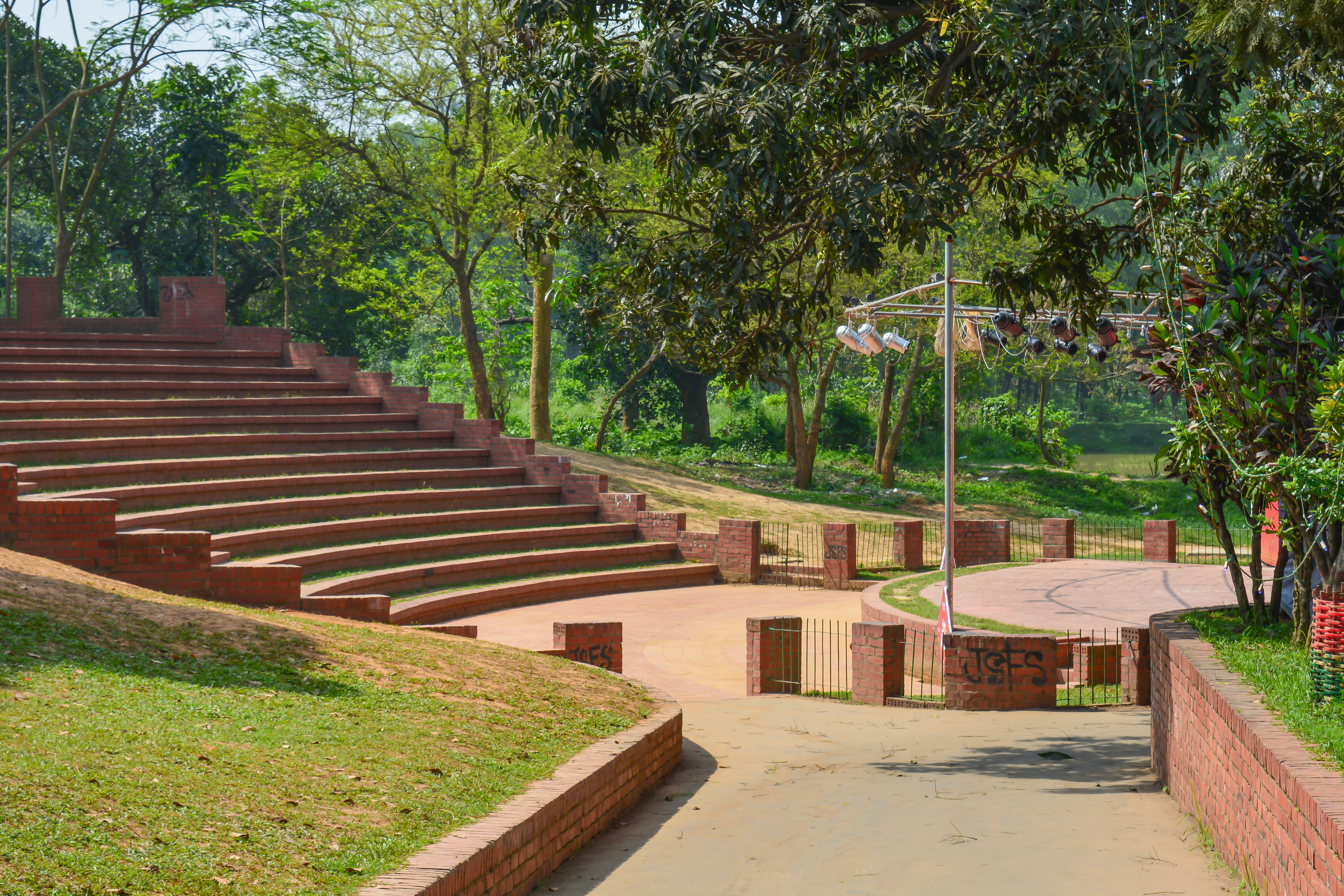
- View of Muktamanch from the entrance
- Interactive map of Selim Al Deen Muktamanch
- Location: Savar Upazila, Dhaka Division, Bangladesh
- Coordinates: 23.8787°N 90.2708°E
- Owner: Jahangirnagar University
- Capacity: 1500
- Surface: Ceramic brick
- Current use: Drama, cultural events

Construction
- Opened: 1980; 46 years ago
- Years active: 1980–present
- Architect: Alamgir Kabir

Selim Al Deen Muktamanch (commonly known as Muktamanch) is an open air theatre at Jahangirnagar University in Savar, Bangladesh. It is located on the slope of a mound to the east of the university's Student–Teacher Center. It is the first open-air theatre in South Asia to be built in the style of an Ancient Greece theatre. It was long referred to simply as "Mukt Manch", after which it was officially named posthumously in honor of its master planner, Selim Al Deen. Muktamanch opened in 1980 with a production of the play Shakuntala.

== Design ==
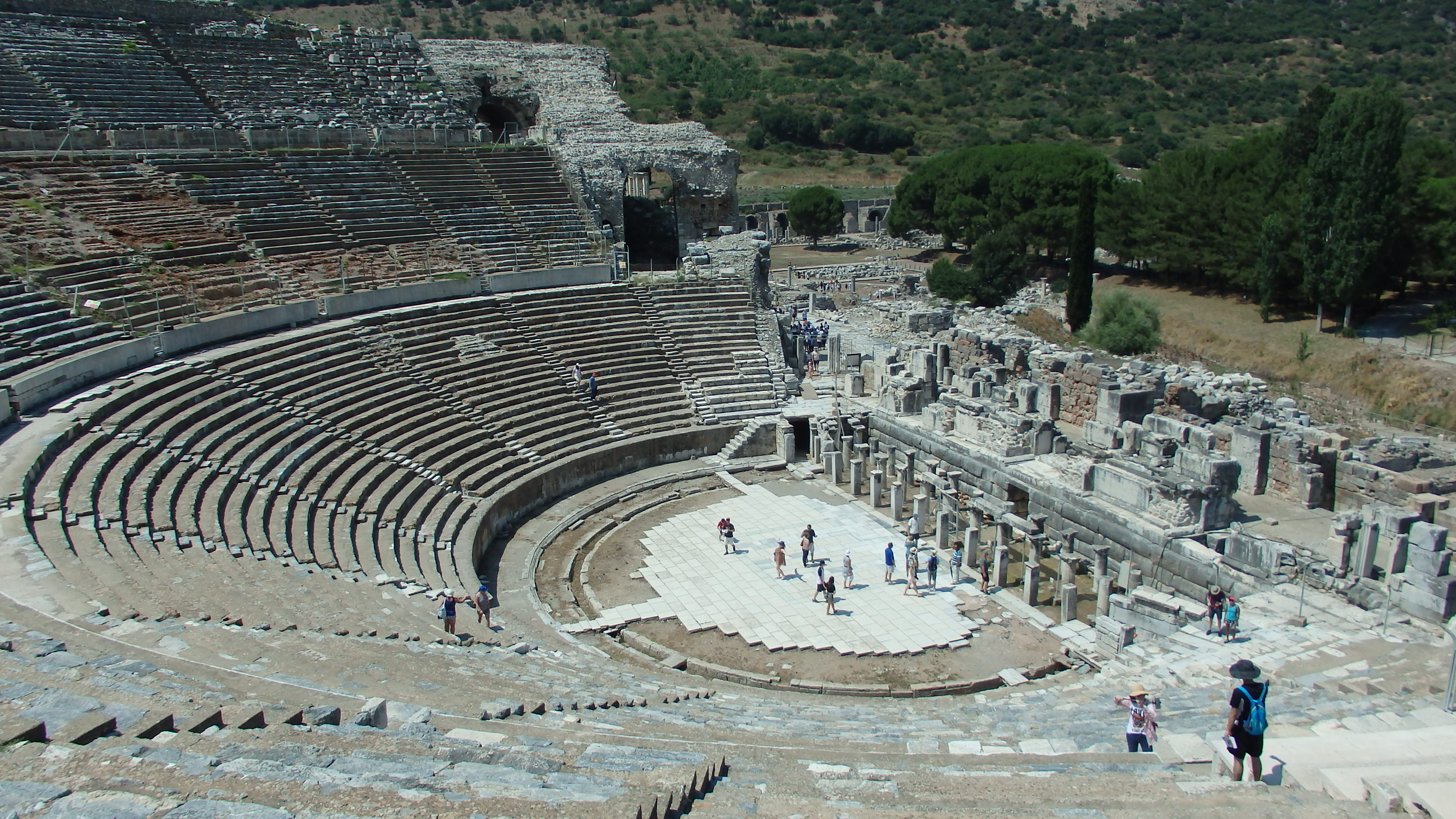
The open stage was designed in the style influenced of ancient theatre of Epidaurus.

To accommodate both the academic needs of the Department of Drama and Dramatics at Jahangirnagar University and the theatrical culture emerging on campus, a plan was conceived to establish a purpose-built, professional-grade stage. The initiative for the construction was spearheaded by Selim Al Deen, the founding chairperson of the Department of Drama and Dramatics. In addition, several prominent figures, such as Mustafa Monwar, Nasir Uddin Yusuf Bachchu, and Zillur Rahman Siddiqui, contributed to the planning and development of the theatre. The architectural design of the theatre was entrusted to filmmaker and architect Alamgir Kabir.

The design and site selection for the stage were heavily influenced by the topographical resemblance between Jahangirnagar's landscape and the rugged terrains of ancient Greece. The vision was the creation of a performance space modeled after the open-air theatres of ancient Greece. Such theatres were typically built by carving into uneven valleys, creating a sloped area where the main stage, or orchestra, was positioned, and spectator seating was arranged along the natural incline of the surrounding hills. Similarly, the open stage at Jahangirnagar was constructed on lower ground with three open sides in front of the central stage, inspired by the design of the ancient Greek theatre at Epidaurus. The open-air stage at Jahangirnagar University is the first structure in Bangladesh—and indeed in Indian subcontinent—constructed in the ancient Greek open-air style.

The entire structure, including the tiered seating carved into the natural slope, is constructed using red ceramic brick masonry. The architectural design ensures that performances on stage are both audibly and visually accessible from every point in the audience seating without the aid of artificial sound amplification or lighting systems. An iron framework is installed above the central stage platform to facilitate the suspension of fabric coverings and lighting equipment as required. The audience seating consists of 14 ascending tiers, accommodating up to 1,500 spectators simultaneously.

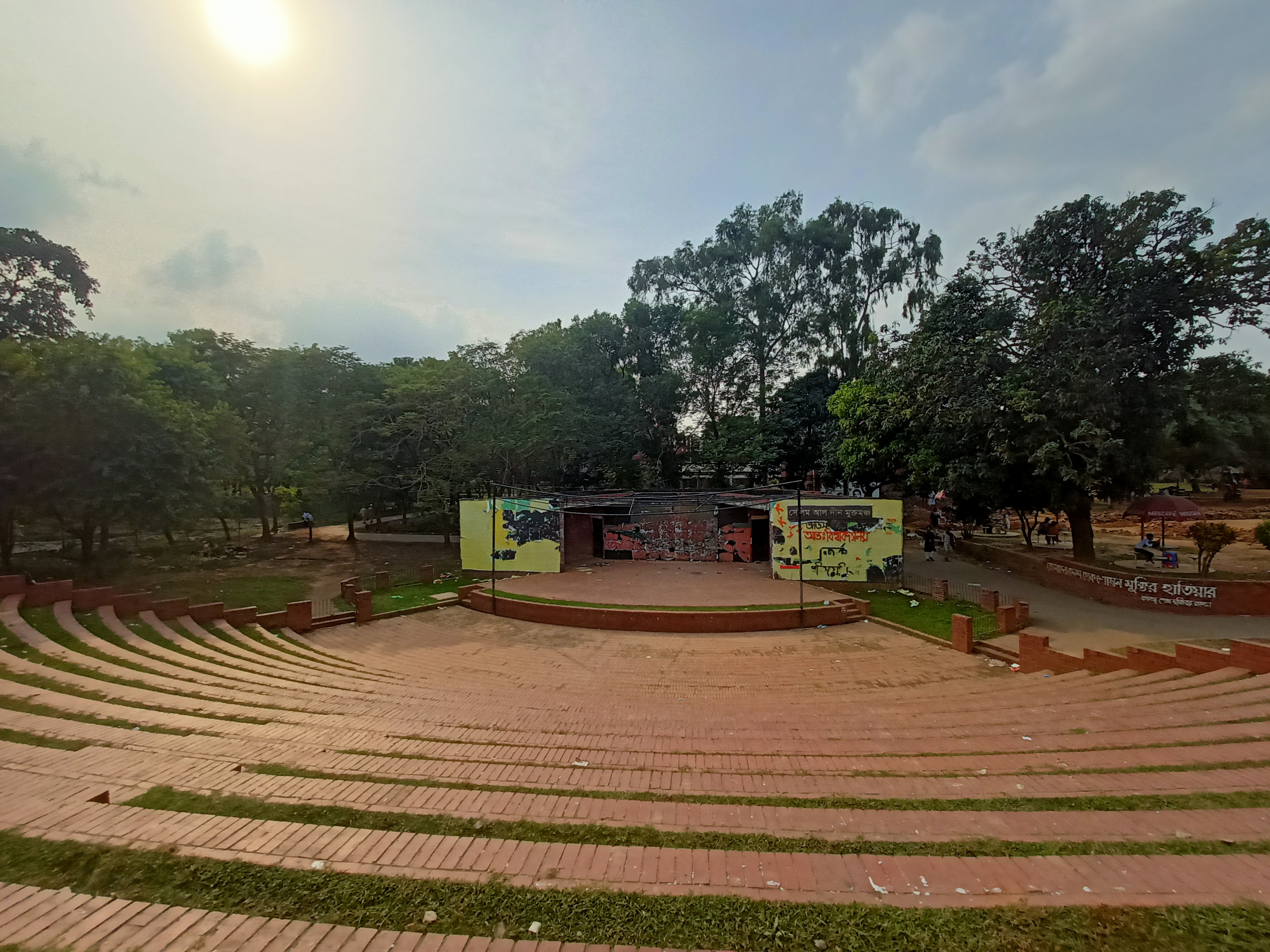
The Student-Teacher Centre in the background.

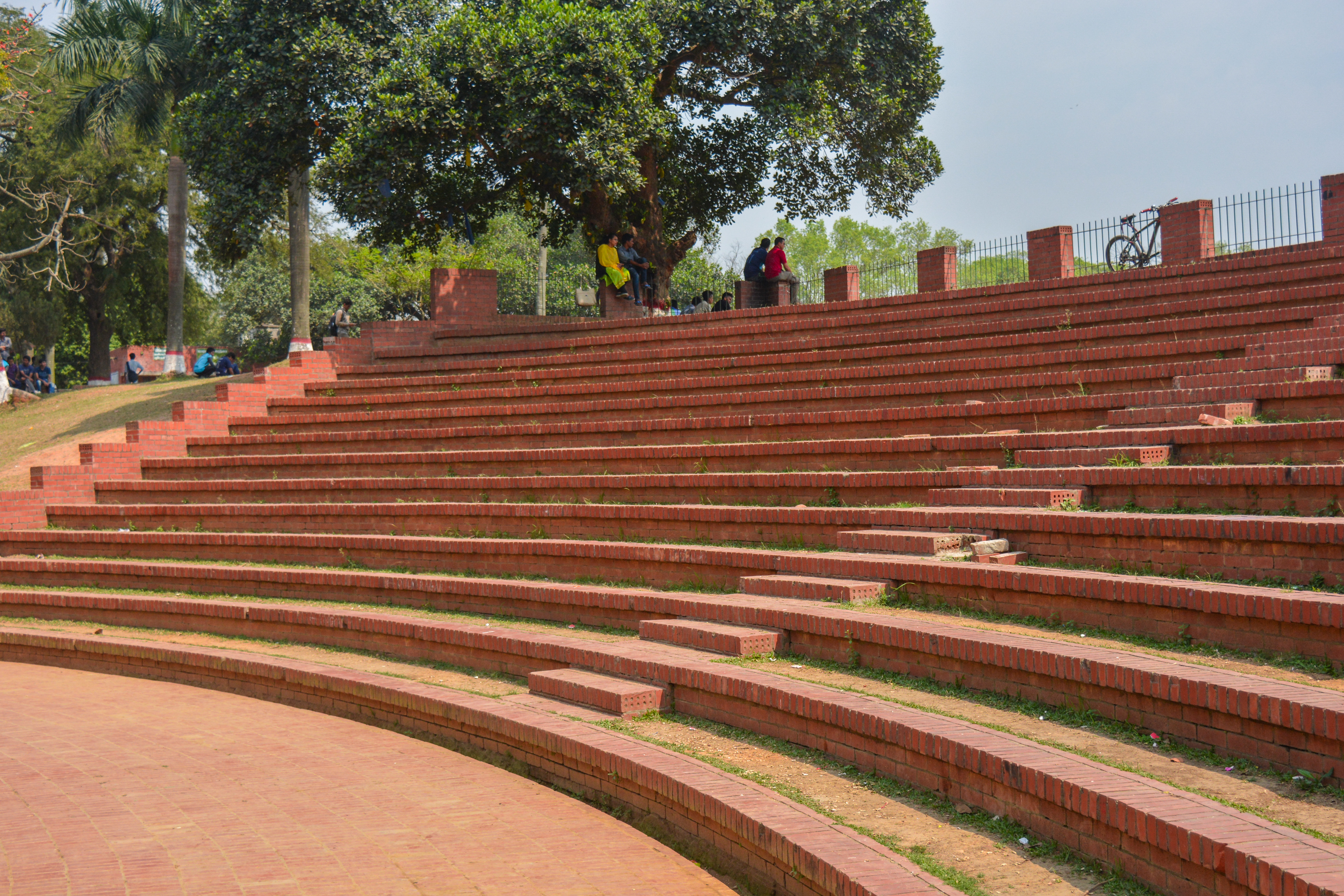
One side of gallery from ground

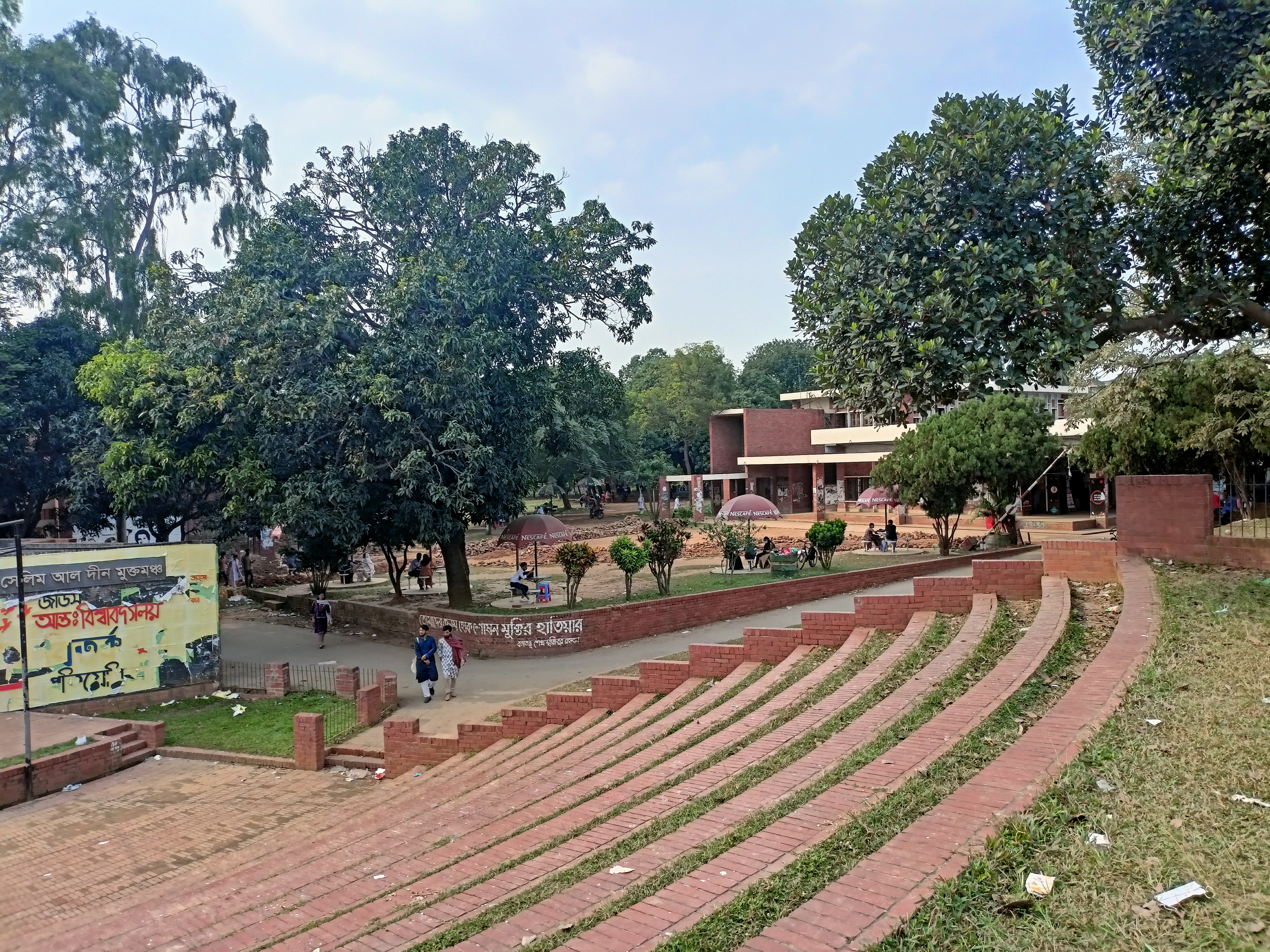
Entrance from cafeteria

== History ==
Although theatrical performances are most commonly staged here, Muktamanch at Jahangirnagar University serves as the central venue for nearly all cultural activities on campus. Annually, approximately 250 events are organized here, including national debate competitions, departmental reunions, graduation ceremonies, concerts, theatre festivals, and celebrations such as University Day.

The first university-based theatre troupe in Bangladesh, Jahangirnagar Theatre, inaugurated Muktmanch in the early dawn of 1980 with a performance of Shakuntala. Actors such as Shahiduzzaman Selim, Faruque Ahamed, and Subhasish Bhowmik began their theatrical journeys by performing in this production. In 1991, during a concert at the open stage, rain started falling shortly after the band Different Touch began their song "Sraboner Meghgulo Joro Holo Akashe". The same phenomenon repeated during another performance of the song at the venue in 1992.
