= Bonna Mirza =

Bangladeshi actress

- বন্যা মির্জা
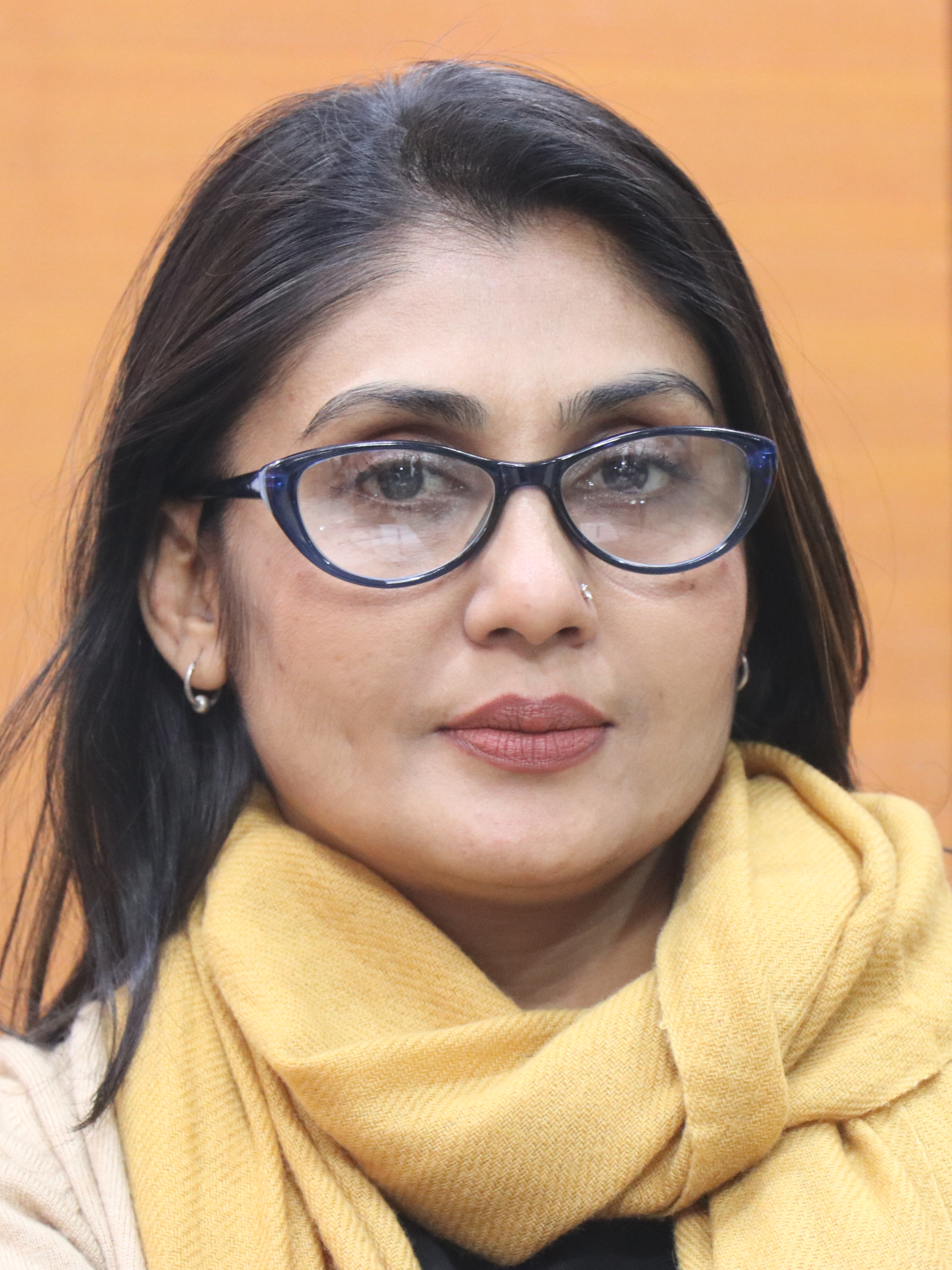
- Mirza in 2018
- Born: 9 September 1975 (age 50)
- Education: Masters in Theatre
- Alma mater: University of Dhaka
- Occupation: Actress
- Years active: 1991–present
- Spouse: Manosh Chowdhury (m. 2010)

Bonna Mirza (born 9 September 1975) is a Bangladeshi actress who works in television, film, and on stage. Mirza started her career in 1992 with theatre group DeshNatok, a member of group theater federation. She is an enlisted artist of Bangladesh Television (BTV) and Bangladesh Betar.

Mirza's notable theatre performances are Nitya Puran, Darpane Sharatshashi, A Dolls' House, and Ghorlopat. Since 2018, she is the elected secretary of Actors' Equity, the professional organization of television actors. She is a speaker on various social issues in different social forums: educational institutions, social organizations and TV channels.

== Early life and education ==
Born in Kushtia, Mirza was with her parents. Her father is a retired government officer and her mother is a housewife. She took secondary examination from Kushtia Govt. Girls' High School. Later she moved to Dhaka for study, and completed her master's degree in theater and performance studies from University of Dhaka.

== Personal life ==
In 2010, Mirza married Manosh Chowdhury. He teaches at Jahangirnagar University. She is second among three sisters and she has a brother.

== Career ==
Mirza debuted her acting career in 1992 with the theatre troupe Desh Natok. Some years later, she started acting in television drama in 1997, while she still was in the university. After years of professional acting on television, she started anchoring television program with renowned Bangladeshi television channels like Ekattor TV, News 24, G-TV etc. Since 2015, she also started career as a marketing professional and currently working as Head of Marketing in Bangla Tribune. Her first performance in television drama was in Shukher Nongor, directed by Saidul Anam Tutul, in 1997. Mirza is the anchor of the television show Ekattorer Shokal of Ekattor TV. She performed in Tanvir Mokammel's directorial venture Rabeya (2009).

Mirza was elected the programme secretary for the Film Artistes' Association.

== Works ==
=== Television dramas ===
- Vober Hat
- Ronger Manush
- Doll's House
- Shomudrojol
- Ful Mahal
- Chhaya Poth
- Shukher Nongor (1997)
- Batasher Ghor
- Maa Tui Kemon Achhish
- Shopno Bazar
- Megh Bondhu
- Shimanto
- Bhabi
- Shobuj Gram Neel Dish Antennae
- Onno Rokom Brishti
- Lucky Thirteen
- Manobjomin
- Shopnobajar
- Amoratrir Gaan

=== Stage plays ===
- Shurgaon
- Nityapuran
- Birsa Kabbo
- Ghor Lopat

=== Movies ===
- Head Master
- Omar Faruker Maa
- Pita
- Rabeya
- Shorot 71

== Awards ==
Year	Award	Category	Outcome
2018	India-Bangladesh Friendship Award		Won
2017	Junior Chamber of Commerce Peace Award		Won
2016	Canada-Bangladesh Solidarity Award		Won
2005	Bhashani Memorial Award		Won
2003	Television Forum Audience Award	Best Actor	Won
2001	Bachasas Award	Best actor (Nityapuran)	Won
