= Bhadun =

Bhadun ভাদুন
- Village
- Location in Dhaka Division Bhadun (Bangladesh)
- Coordinates: 23°56′16″N 90°27′35″E
- Country: Bangladesh
- Division: Dhaka
- District: Gazipur
- Upazilla: Sadar

Government
  - Type: City corporation
  - Body: GCC

Languages
  - National: Bengali
- Time zone: UTC+6:00 (BST)
- PIN code: 1721

Bhadun is a village in Gazipur District of Bangladesh. It is popularly known as "the shooting village", as it is used as a filming location for drama television series. Holy Cross Retreat and Pastoral Center, a cemetery, is situated here.

== Location ==
The village, situated in Pubail, Gazipur District, is located 21 km (13 mi) from Dhaka, the capital of Bangladesh, and 7 km (4.3 mi) from Gazipur.

== History ==
The village became known after the filming of director Amjad Hossain's drama series Agun Laga Sandhya, an Ekushey Television original programme, in this village. In the 1990s, one had to go far from Dhaka to film village scenes for television and film. In 1997, Hossain started scouting for a new village for the drama series. He found a suitable house for shooting in Bhadun. The owner of the house was initially reluctant but Hossain eventually convinced him to allow shooting there. Hossain had an acquaintance in the village and converted his house into a shooting house; then Salahuddin Lavlu filmed several of his TV series in this village, including Sakin Sarisuri. Thus, the village became popular for shooting drama series.

Filming activity in the village was stopped for seven months due to the COVID-19 epidemic in 2020 before the government allowed its resumption.

== Shooting houses ==
Until 2006, there was only one shooting house in this village, but the number of houses used for filming began to increase; as of 2022, the village has 10 shooting houses. Some actors have settled here for filming purposes. Shakib Khan's shooting house, called "Jannat House", is located in this village. Mosharraf Karim, along with his two friends, rented a house for three years and made it a shooting house; Salahuddin Lavlu also owned a shooting house here. Notable shooting houses in the village include Meghla, Aakash Villa, Oishi Suiting, Bilvilla, Hasnahena, Shaheen's House, Apan Bhuban, and Krishna Chura.

== Commercialization ==
The commercialization of the village started in 2003. Being located very close to Dhaka, this village is popular with production houses. Until 2002, the producers did not pay money to get houses or other materials for shooting in this village, but afterwards they had to rent materials from the villagers. According to TBS News, in 2022, renting a cow for drama series shootings cost ৳1,000 (US$11) and ৳200 (US$2.10) for chickens. At least ৳4,000 (US$43) per day is required to get a house for shooting. According to Risingbd.com in 2022, rentals of wives at ৳500 (US$5.30) per day are available.

== Urbanisation ==
Bhadun is gradually turning into a city due to the impact of urbanization. Industrialization is also creating environmental issues.
