= Doll's House (TV series) =

- Genre: Telenovela
- Written by: Abul Kalam Azad; Chanchal M. Rahman; Tazin Ahmed
- Directed by: Afsana Mimi; Bodrul Alam Soud
- Starring: Suborna Mustafa; Shompa Reza; Mita Chowdhury; Wahida Mollick Jolly; Chitralekha Guha; Traupa Majumder; Jeetu Ahsan; Intekhab Dinar; Bonna Mirza; Farhana Mithu; Bijori Barkatullah; Fazlur Rahman Babu; Shanjida Priti; Shojol; Humayun Faridi; Tushar Khan; Abul Kalam Azad
- Country of origin: Bangladesh
- Original language: Bengali
- No. of episodes: 375

Production
- Executive producers: Afsana Mimi; Tazin Ahmed
- Producer: Krishnochura
- Production location: Dhaka
- Running time: 18 minutes
- Production company: Aarong

Original release
- Network: ATN Bangla
- Release: 17 January 2007 – 23 May 2009

Dollhouse is a Bangladeshi television soap opera written by Abul Kalam Azad, Chonchol and Tazin Ahmed. The serial ran on ATN Bangla from 2007 to 2009, with 380 episodes in all. It is set in modern-day Dhaka. It stars Suborna Mustafa, Shompa Reza, Mita Chowdhury, Wahida Mollick Jolly, Chitralekha Guha, Traupa Majumder, Jeetu Ahsan, Intekhab Dinar, Bonna Mirza, Farhana Mithu, Bijori Barkatullah, Fazlur Rahman Babu, Shanjida Priti, Shojol, Humayun Faridi, Tushar Khan and the co-writer himself, Abul Kalam Azad.

== Characters ==
- Suborna Mustafa
- Shampa Reza
- Mita Chowdhury
- Wahida Mollick Jolly
- Chitralekha Guha
- Tropa Majumder
- Jeetu Ahsan
- Intekhab Dinar
- Bonna Mirza
- Farhana Mithu
- Bijori Barkatullah
- Fazlur Rahman Babu
- Sanjida Preeti
- Shajal
- Humayun Faridi
- Tushar Khan
- Abul Kalam Azad
- Subhashis Bhowmik

== See also ==
- Songsoptok
- Bohubrihi
- Kothao Keu Nei
- Baker bhai
- Aaj Robibar
- Vober Hat
- House Full (TV series)
- Bishaash
