= Kazi Anisul Haque Borun =

Bangladeshi actor, director and photographer

- কাজী আনিসুল হক বরুণ
- Born: March 1, 1971 (age 55)
- Citizenship: Bangladeshi
- Education: Govt. Edward College, Pabna (BA) Shanto-Mariam University of Creative Technology (MA)
- Years active: 1987–present
- Known for: Acting, direction and photography
- Spouse: Sheuly Akhter (married 2004–present)
- Children: 1

Kazi Anisul Haque Borun (born March 1, 1971) is a Bangladeshi actor, director and photographer. He has worked in television shows, mainstream theatre and OTT platforms.

== Early life and education ==
=== Early life ===
Borun was born in Pabna, East Pakistan on March 1, 1971.

=== Education ===
Borun attended the Police Lines School, Pabna, and the Pabna Gopal Chandra Institution, of which in the latter he received his primary and secondary education. He earned a BA degree from the Govt. Edward College, Pabna, and an MA in Bengali literature from the Shanto-Mariam University of Creative Technology in Dhaka. Over the years, Borun has conducted numerous courses and workshops on acting, play designing, choreography, direction, and related topics in several public and private institutions.

== Career ==
=== Acting ===
He started his career by stage theatre. Then he started acting in television dramas, OTT platforms and mainstream film industry.

Borun in 'Daribaba' character costume in the Harkipte telefilm

==== Acting on screen ====
Borun's most notable screen performances are:

- Sakin Sarisuri
- Harkipte (the telefilm; not to be confused with the television serial with the same name)
- Alta Sundori
- Ghor
- Papbazar
- The Grave
- Munshigiri
- Daag
- Issac Liton
- Priyo Maloti
- Jamai Mela

To this day, Borun is still commonly known as "Mannan Bhai" for his role in Sakin Sarisuri.

==== Acting on stage ====
Borun's most notable stage performances are:

- Urubhanga (Sanskrit play)
- A Doll's House (Henrik Ibsen)
- Raja (Rabindranath Tagore)
- Pir Chand (inspired by Peer Gynt, Henrik Ibsen)
- Troilus and Cressida (William Shakespeare)
- Raktakarabi (Rabindranath Tagore)

=== Theatre direction ===
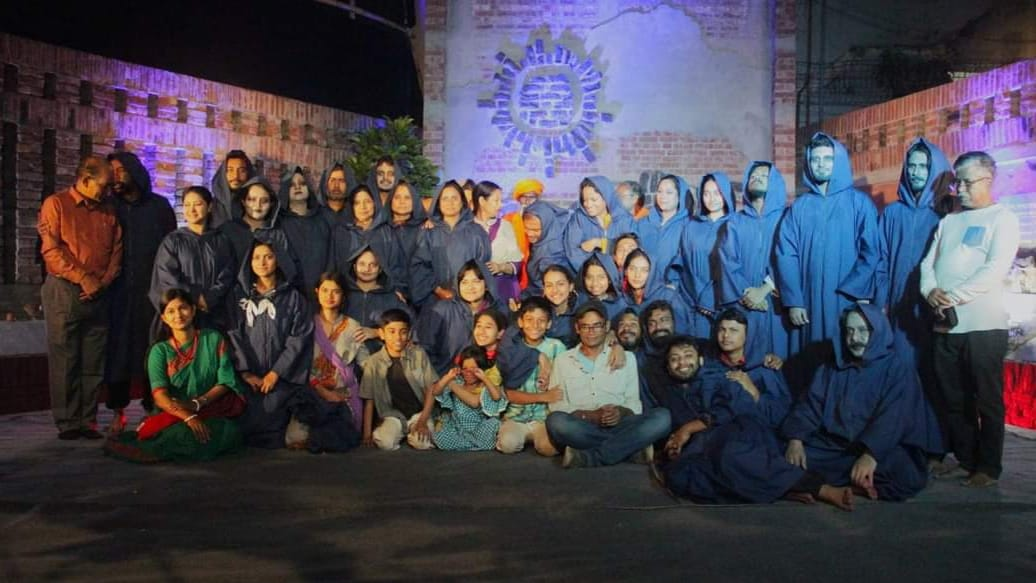
Full cast of "Juddho Puran" directed by Borun in 2024. He is seen in the centre wearing a white shirt and a cap.

Borun is also renowned for his theatre direction. His most notable direction works are:

- Tarok (proscenium theatre about and with the LGBTQ community in Bangladesh)
- Anne Frank (proscenium theatre)
- Juddho Puran (environmental theatre, performed: 2014 and 2024)
- Joy Bangla Pukur (environmental theatre)
- Ganer Pakhi (children's' theatre)

=== Photography ===
Borun is also an artist in the field of photo art. His first exhibition titled Introspection at the Zainul Gallery, Faculty of Fine Arts, University of Dhaka received a lot of appreciation by critics and visitors. His photography was also hugely said as a "painterly approach" to photography. Borun's works have also been admired by persons such as Kazi Khaleed Ashraf and Syed Manzoorul Islam.

=== Office job ===
As head of the audiovisual department, during seventeen years of his tenure in Bengal Foundation, he supervised and directed a lot of documentary films and audiovisual presentations.

== See also ==
- Site-specific theatre
- Proscenium
- Over-the-top media service
