= Masud Akhond =

Bangladeshi actor and director

- মাসুদ আখন্দ
- Born: 14 October 1972 (age 53)
- Occupations: director; actor; writer; producer
- Years active: present
- Spouse: Farhana Haque Mitu
- Children: 2

Masud Akhond (born 14 October 1972) is a Bangladeshi actor, director and writer. He won Bachsas Awards Best Actor for his performance in the film Pita (2013) and Jury Prize from San Francisco International Film Festival in 2013 documentary Slave Queen.

== Films ==
- Pita, actor, director, writer, cinematographer.
- Ghetuputra Komola, actor.
- Madhumati, actor.
- Krishnopokkho, actor.
- Shopno Poka (upcoming). director.

== Awards ==
- Bachsas Awards Best Actor Pita
- Jury Prize from San Francisco International Film Festival in 2013. documentary Slave Queen.
- Nominated Meril Prothom Alo Awards Bangladesh 2012 Best Director & Best Actor
