= Aisha Khan (Bangladeshi actress) =

Bangladeshi TV and film actress

- আইশা খান
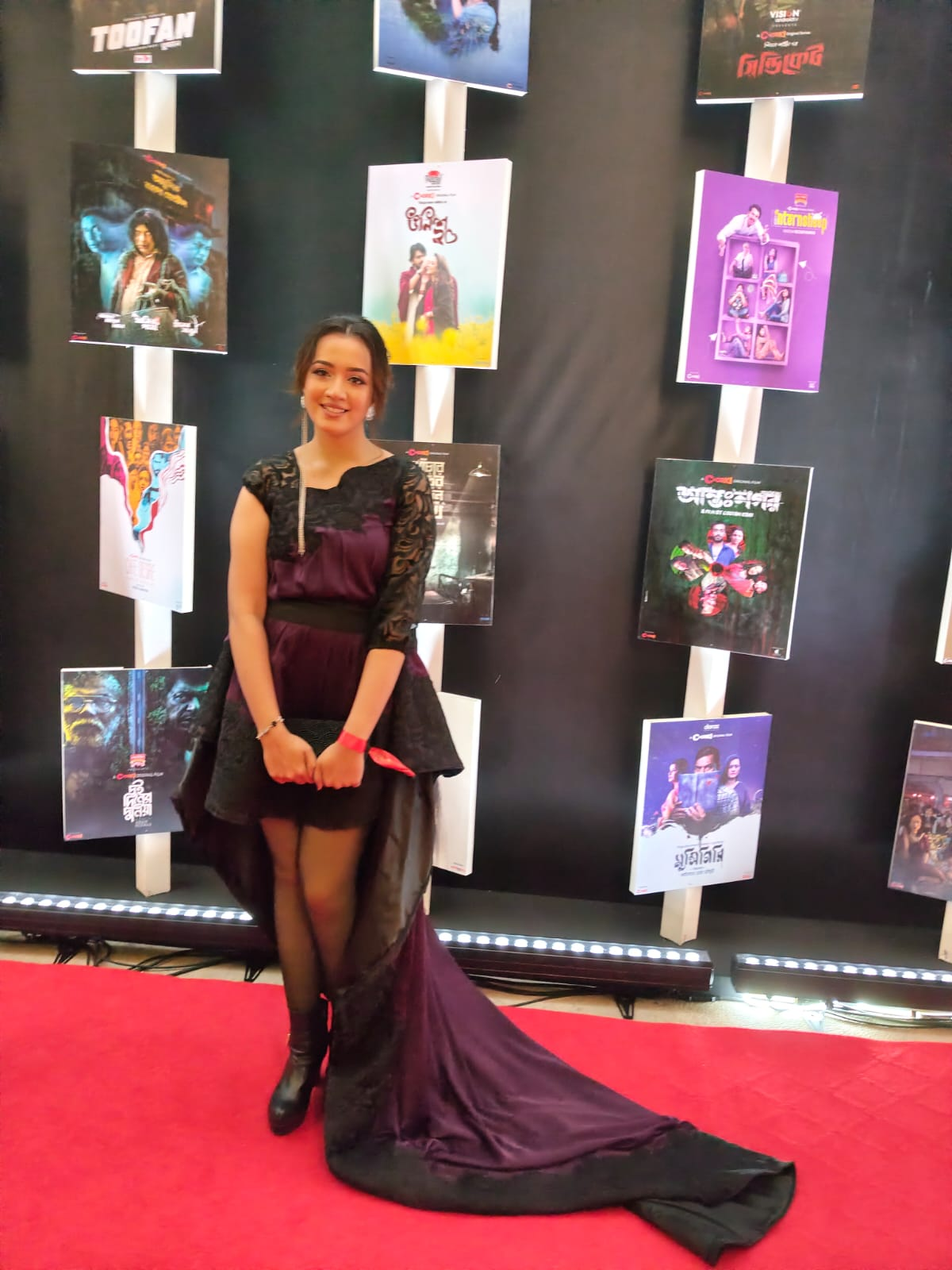
- Aisha Khan in 2026
- Born: 25 July 1997 (age 29); Dhaka, Bangladesh
- Occupations: Film actress; dancer; model; news presenter
- Years active: 2017–present

Tahiya Tazeen Khan Aisha (born 25 July 2002) is a Bangladeshi actress, dancer, model and news presenter who predominantly appears in Dhallywood cinema. She is known for acting in Buk Poketer Golpo, Contract, Kaiser and TV dramas.

== Career ==
She is student of dance department of Bangladesh Shishu Academy. Then after a break she start anchoring in 2017, acting debut in 2020.

== Filmography ==
=== Films ===
Key
†	Denotes films that have not yet been released

Year	Film	Role	Notes	Ref.
2018	Ahoto Phooler Golpo	Shapla	Debut film	(Note: multiple sources:)
2025	Vhoyal	Bokul		(Note: multiple sources:)
2026	Shekor – The Roots	Falguni		(Note: multiple sources:)
2026	Shongbad †	TBA	Filming	(Note: multiple sources:)

=== TV/Web content ===
Year	Title	Role	Notes	Ref.
2020	Tomar Kachhei Jabo		TV Mini Series	
2021	Contact	Uma	Web Series	
2021	Ey Emon Porichoy		Web Series	
2022	Kaiser	Saba	Web Series	
2022	Daag		Web Series	
2022	Cafe Desire	Shirin	Web Series	
2023	Rokto Lagbe		Web Series	
2023	Love Me Too		TV Movie	
2023	Mercules	Snigdha	Web Series	
2023	Buker Moddhye Agun		Web Series	
2023	Ekta Tumi Lagbe		Web Series	
2024	Buk Poketer Golpo		Web Series	
2024	Frenzy		Web Series	
2024	Hridmajare		TV Drama Series	
2024	Dohon		Drama	
2024	Khushbu			
2024	Hoyni Kokhno Bola			
2025	Bethar Bagan		Web Film	
2025	Nonsense		Web Series	

=== Short film ===
Year	Title	Role	Notes	Ref.
2025	Next Door Neighbor	Bipasha	Short film on Bongo BD	
