= Jibondhuli =

- জীবনঢুলী
- Directed by: Tanvir Mokammel
- Written by: Tanvir Mokammel
- Screenplay by: Tanvir Mokammel
- Based on: Bangladesh Liberation War
- Produced by: Kino-Eye Films
- Starring: Shatabdi Wadud; Ramendu Majumdar; Wahida Mollick Jolly; Chitralekha Guho; Jyotika Jyoti; Uttam Guho
- Cinematography: Mahfuzur Rahman Khan
- Edited by: Mahadeb Shi
- Production company: Kino-Eye Films
- Distributed by: Kino-Eye Films
- Release date: 14 February 2014
- Running time: 97 mins
- Country: Bangladesh
- Language: Bengali

Jibondhuli (Bengali: জীবনঢুলী), also known as The Drummer, is a 2014 Bangladeshi Bengali-language drama film written and directed by Tanvir Mokammel, produced under Kino-Eye Films. The film is based on the Bangladesh Liberation War in 1971, circulating around a lower caste Hindu dhak player. The film was set to be released in December 2013, but eventually premiered in Dhaka on February 14, 2014. Jibondhuli was also premiered at the National Art Gallery of the Shilpakala Academy on October 20, 2017, along with Pich Dhala Path and Monpura.

The film was shot in various locations, including Pubail in Gazipur, and also in Khulna's Chuknagar, where the Chuknagar massacre was depicted.

== Plot ==
Jibonkrishna Das is a lower caste Hindu drummer who faces humiliation from the upper caste Hindus and the Muslims. When the Pakistan Army captured his village, he attempted to flee to India with his family. On their way though, hundreds of people, including Jibon's family, were killed by the army. Jibon, however, survived and was traumatized by the incident.

Jibon returns to his village, now occupied by the Razakars. He was spared by the commander of the Razakars and later went to the military base where he was obliged to abandon his dhak and play the western drum for the Pakistan Army. He becomes devastated and even faces discrimination by the army for his religion. Later, the army kidnaps Bengali women and keeps them hostage. The Mukti Bahini fighters arrive and raze the military base. Jibon later abandons the drum and takes his dhak to celebrate the liberation of his village from the razakars.

== Cast ==
- Shatabdi Wadud as Jibonkrishna Das - A lower caste dhak player who is humiliated by the upper caste Hindus and Muslims.
- Ramendu Majumdar
- Wahida Mollick Jolly
- Chitralekha Guho
- Jyotika Jyoti as Shandharani
- Rafika Eva
- Tabibul Islam Babu
- Pran Roy
- Paresh Acharya
- Uttam Guho
- Mrinal Dutta in the music video 'Ore O Dada, Ami Jabo Sealdah', also sang by Dutta humself.

== Music ==
Jibondhuli

Soundtrack album by Syed Shabab Ali Arzoo
- Released: July 2013
- Genre: Original soundtrack

The soundtrack album for Jibondhuli was released on July 7, 2013. The album includes two folk songs and four others written by Tanvir Mokammel. The composer of the songs is Syed Shabab Ali Arzoo, who is the film's music director. Rajkumari Dasi Sundori, a survivor of the Chuknagar massacre, unveiled the album cover.

#	Title	Singer(s)	Lyrics
1	"Mayer Mati Achol Chere"	Abu Bakar Siddique	Tanvir Mokammel
2	"Ore O Dada, Ami Jabo Sealdah"	Mrinal Dutta	Tanvir Mokammel
3	"E Kon Bhongo Somoy"	Chitralekha Guho	Tanvir Mokammel
4	"Dhak Tumi Bajo"	Abu Bakar Siddique	Tanvir Mokammel
5	"Tora Dekhe Ja"	Matuas	Collected
6	"Make Bhashaya Jole"	Chitralekha Guho	Collected
