= Ronger Manush =

- Genre: Drama serial
- Written by: Selim Al Deen; Masum Reza
- Directed by: Salauddin Lavlu
- Starring: ATM Shamsuzzaman; Wahida Mallik Jolly; Fazlur Rahman Babu; Salauddin Lavlu; Tania Ahmed; AKM Hasan; Bonna Mirza; Pran Ray
- Theme music composer: S.I. Tutul
- Country of origin: Bangladesh
- Original language: Bengali
- No. of episodes: 109

Production
- Producer: Salauddin Lavlu
- Production locations: Pubail, Gazipur Sadar Upazila, Bangladesh
- Running time: 20 minutes (episode)

Original release
- Network: NTV
- Release: 2004 – 2004

Ronger Manush (Bengali: রঙের মানুষ) is a Bangladeshi drama television series that aired on NTV in 2004. It was the directorial debut of Salauddin Lavlu. The spin-off series Kemon Ache Ronger Manushera was made in 2014, and premiered on Eid. It was shot in Pubail, and is set in a village where everyone lives peacefully.

== Cast ==
- ATM Shamsuzzaman as Bostani Shah
- Salauddin Lavlu as Badan Shah
- Wahida Mollick Jolly as Hamela
- Tania Ahmed as Manjela
- Toriqul Islam Tusher
- Ahmed Rubel as Shaharali
- Fazlur Rahman Babu as Pocketmar
- Bonna Mirza as Ranga
- Rumana
- Rahmat Ali as Panju Khan
- AKM Hasan as Rakhal
- Pran Ray as Dublo
