= Rabeya (film) =

- A excerpt from the film
- রাবেয়া
- Directed by: Tanvir Mokammel
- Written by: Tanvir Mokammel
- Story by: Tanvir Mokammel
- Based on: Bangladesh Liberation War
- Produced by: Kino-Eye Films
- Starring: Aly Zaker; Bonna Mirza; Tauquir Ahmed; Arman Parvez Murad; Jyotika Jyoti; Masum Aziz; Uttam Guho; Abul Hayat
- Cinematography: Anwar Hossain
- Edited by: Mahadeb Shi
- Music by: Syed Shabab Ali Arzoo
- Production company: Kino-Eye Films
- Distributed by: Kino-Eye Films
- Release date: 2008
- Running time: 103 mins
- Country: Bangladesh
- Language: Bengali

Rabeya (Bengali: রাবেয়া), also known by its English title, The Sister, is a 2008 Bangladeshi Bengali-language war film written and directed by Tanvir Mokammel, with permission from the government of Bangladesh. The film is set during the Bangladesh Liberation War in 1971. It stars Aly Zaker, Bonna Mirza, Jyotika Jyoti, and Tauquir Ahmed in lead roles. According to Mokammel, Rabeya is a "deconstruction" of the Sophocles play, Antigone, and premiered on December 6, 2008.

The film was shot in Khulna and Bagerhat. It screened at the Singapore International Film Festival and in Copenhagen. It was also broadcast on television in ATN Bangla on December 13, 2008.

== Plot ==
Two orphaned sisters, Rabeya (Bonna Mirza) and Rokeya (Jyotika Jyoti), live with their uncle, Emdad Kazi (Aly Zaker). He is a conservative Muslim League leader supporting the Pakistan Army, in the village of Ibrahimpur located by the Rupsa River in the Ganges Delta, where a Pakistani army captain stationed a military base. Emdad wants one of his nieces, Rabeya, to be married to his son, Tariqul. Kazi's nephew, Khaled, joins the Mukti Bahini to fight for Bangladesh's independence, but is shot dead by the Pakistan Army during a battle. He is left alone, unburied by the river, and no one is allowed to be near the corpse. The Pakistan Army warned against burying any guerrilla fighter, branded as an 'Indian agent' or 'traitor', and anyone doing so will be executed. Rabeya attempts to bury her brother, but while doing so, she runs away from the spot after almost being noticed by the razakars. Later, she tries to bury her brother again, but is caught and later spared. Rabeya is later taken to her uncle, who tells her that burying someone is not the duty of a woman. One night, she goes alone and attempts to continue burying her brother, but is caught by the Pakistan Army and shot dead. The Bengali guerrilla fighters declare Rabeya as a martyr, and inspire the poor peasants to stand against the army for an independent Bangladesh.

== Cast ==
- Aly Zaker as Emdad Kazi - a conservative chairman of the village of Ibrahimpur
- Bonna Mirza as Rabeya - a courageous sister who attempted to bury her brother, Khaled, but was shot dead at the spot
- Tauquir Ahmed as the intellectually challenged son of Kazi.
- Arman Parvez Murad as Tariqul - Rabeya's fiancé
- Jyotika Jyoti as Rokeya - Rabeya's sister
- Masum Aziz as a soldier of the Pakistan Army
- Uttam Guho
- Chitralekha Guho
- Abul Hayat as the father of the sisters, possibly, in a cameo appearance
