= Nazmul Huda Bachchu =

Bangladeshi actor (1938–2017)

- নাজমুল হুদা বাচ্চু
- Born: 11 July 1938; Ranaghat Kolkata, Bengal Presidency, British India
- Died: 28 June 2017 (aged 78); Dhaka, Bangladesh
- Education: University of Dhaka
- Occupations: Actor and singer
- Years active: 1961-2017
- Spouse: Lina Nazmul
- Children: 3

Nazmul Huda Bachchu (11 July 1938 – 28 June 2017) was a Bangladeshi film and television actor. He won Bangladesh National Film Award.

== Early life and education ==
From 1938 to 1950 he was in Kolkata with his parents. His father was a doctor at Kolkata Railway Hospital. After partition they moved to East Pakistan (Bangladesh). Bachchu completed his post graduation in political science from the University of Dhaka in 1963.

Bachchu began his career in music and became a singer and music director. While he was a student, he served as a singer on the radio. In 1961, he provided vocals for the song "Obhimaan Korona" in the film Harano Din, directed by Mustafizul Haq. He performed as a playback singer for several films.

Bachchu emerged as an actor by his performances at SM Hall at the University of Dhaka. He made his television debut in the drama series Chacha Bhatija and film debut in Babul Chowdhury's Aakabaaka.

Bachchu died on 28 June 2017 in Square Hospital in Dhaka. He made his last film appearance in Oggatonama, directed by Tauquir Ahmed.

== Works ==
Films

- Oggatonama (2016)
- Runway (2010)
- Chandra Grahan (2008)
- Daktar Bari (2007)
- Bidrohi Padma (2006)
- Chandrokotha (2003)
- Chitra Nodir Pare (1998)
- Srabon Megher Din (1999)
- Shonkhonil Karagar (1992)
- Surja Dighal Bari (1979)
- Alongkar (1978)
- Sareng Bou (1978)
- Behula Lakhinder (1977)
- Gangchil
- Chanda
- Jowar Elo
- Aakabaaka

Television dramas

- Bohubrihi (1988)
- Sakin Sarisuri (2009)

Guest Appearance

- Kothao Keu Nei (1993)
