= Shaina Amin =

Bangladeshi model, television and film actress

- শায়না আমিন
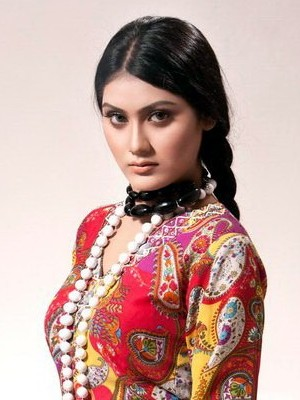
- Born: Mahmuda Amin Shaina; 26 February 1991 (age 35); Makkah, Saudi Arabia
- Occupations: Actress, model
- Years active: 2005–2015

Mahmuda Amin Shaina (born 26 February 1991) is a former Bangladeshi television and film actress and also a model. She began her career as a model appearing in commercials in 2005. In 2006 she made her debut in television drama performing in Cross Connection. She then has appeared in several television drama,film and series till now.

In 2011, Amin first acted in feature film Meherjaan directed by Rubaiyat Hossain. In the film she played the role of Young Meherjaan. She appeared in two more films released in 2012 and 2015, which are Pita (The Father) directed by Masud Akhand and Putro Ekhon Poyshawala directed by Nargis Akter.

== Early life and education ==
Shaina was born in Mecca, Saudi Arabia to parents of Bangladeshi descent. Her father, Nurul Amin, is a businessman, and her mother, Hasna Amin, is a housewife. At the age of one and half, her parents moved to Bangladesh and settled at Lalmatia in Dhaka. She learned dance from Shibli Mohammad and admitted into a dance school called "Nrityangon". She went to Lalmatia Women's College in Dhaka and currently studies there.

== Career ==
=== Modeling and television ===
In 2005, Amin began her career as a model, appearing in a TV commercial of "Sunsilk hair shampoo". She was a ten grade student back then. The next year, in 2006 she appeared in television dramas. Her first TV drama was "Cross Connection" directed by Badrul Islam Saud. From on, She continued to perform in television dramas and commercials.

In 2008, Amin appeared in Premer Ongko, a television drama directed by Abul Al Sayeed. She also performed in telefilm Mon Uchaton.

In 2011, Amin acted in several television series including Life is beautiful, Coming Soon and Lokaloy. She also appeared in television drama V.I.P. and Abu Karim. In the year, she also appeared with Antu Karim in the music video for song "Ek Jibon" written by Shahid and sung by Shahid and Subhamita Banerjee.

Between 2012 and 2013, Amin acted in several television drama, series and telefilm including Opratisthanik Shikkha Sofor (A Unofficial Excursion), Priyo Maa (Dear Mother), College, Relation, Antoheen and Genie Made In Ginijira.

In 2014, Amin appeared in My Ex-girlfriend, a valentine special drama aired on 14 February. She also appeared in two television series Colour and Daag, and television dramas including Shopner Shuru o Shesh, Preyoshi, Shei Meyeti, In a Relationship and Shadharon Gyan.

=== Film ===
In 2011, Amin made her film debut with Rubaiyat Hossain's full feature film Meherjan, and she played the role "Young Meher" in the film. Popular Indian actor Victor Banerjee and actress Jaya Bachchan and Bangladeshi actor Humayun Faridi also starred in the film. The film was released on 21 January 2011 in Bangladesh. In 2012, she appeared in Pita (The Father) directed by Masud Akhand and produced by Impress Telefilm Limited. Both films are based on Bangladesh war of liberation in 1971. Amin played the role of Pollobi, a Hindu pregnant wife during the war. The film released on 28 December 2012 in Bangladesh and premiered on 5 May 2013 at the Wilshire theater of Beverly Hills, LA. In the same year, she signed for another film Putro Ekhon Poysawala directed by Nargis Akterandstarring prominent actress Bobita, Mamnun Hasan Emon, Farah Ruma and Omar Ayaz Oni. The film was supposed to release early in 2014 but delayed for several reason. Finally it was released on 15 January 2015.

== Personal life ==
Shaina married UK expatriate Masud Rana on 15 March 2015. They have a son and a daughter.

== Filmography ==
=== Film ===
Year	Film	Director	Role	Notes	Ref(s)
2011	Meherjaan	Rubaiyat Hossain	Young Meher	Film debut	
2012	Pita (The Father)	Masud Akhand	Pollobi		
2015	Putro Ekhon Poysawala	Nargis Akter	Chandni		

=== Television ===
Year	Title	Director	Co-actors	Notes	Ref
2006	Cross Connection	Badrul Anam Saud		Acting debut	
2008	Premer Ongko	Abu Al Sayeed			
	Mon Uchaton	Arif Khan		Telefilm	
2011	Life is beautiful		Nafiza	TV series (26 episodes)	
2011	Coming Soon	Shoraf Ahmed Jibon	Mosharraf Karim, Kochi Khondokar, Marjuk Russell	TV series	
2011	Lokaloy	Abu Al Sayeed		TV series	
2011	V.I.P.	Jahirul Islam Polash			
2011	Abu Karim	Sushmoy Sumon	Mosharraf Karim		
2012	Opratisthanik Shikkha Sofor	Nasiruddin Imam	Aman	Telefilm	
2012	Priyo Maa	Rumel Ahmed	Arfin Rumey, Ohona	Drama	
	Bishakha			TV series	
2012	College	Pollob Biswas	Anika Kabir Shokh, Niloy,	TV series (26 episodes)	
	Relation			TV series	
2012	Bekar Ek Kar Theke Je Golper Shuru	Syed Jamim	Suborna Mustafa, Shaju Khadem	Eid Drama	
2013	Antoheen	Ripon Miah	Amin Khan		
	Adharer Bashinda			Drama	
	El Nino	Abu Al Sayeed		Drama	
	Danakata Shayeri			TV series	
2013	Genie Made In Ginijira			Telefilm	
2014	My Ex-girlfriend			Valentine Special Drama	
2014	Colour	Raihan Khan	FS Nayeem	TV series (52 episodes)	
2014	Ke Bhashabe Shada Megher Bhela	Jubair Ibn Bakar	Tarin Rahman, Samia		
2014	Tita Mitha Modhuchandrima	Jubair Ibn Bakar	Mosharraf Karim		
2014	Ekti Jadur Baksho O Koyekti Projapoti	Devjyoti Bhokto	Majnun Mizan, Badhon		
2014	Shopner Shuru o Shesh	Nuzhat Alvi Ahmed	Shajal Noor		
2014	Preyoshi	Asif Iqbal Jewel	FS Nayeem, Moushumi Hamid	Drama	
2014	Shei Meyeti	Shakhawat Manik	Nirab, Shetu Mahbub	Eid Drama	
2014	In a Relationship	Mizanur Rahman Aryan	Ziaul Faruq Apurba		
2014	Shadharon Gyan	Hasan Morshed	Mosharraf Karim		
2014	Khelna	Oli Ahmed	Azizul Hakim	Telefilm	
2014	Daag	Sabur Khan	Apurba, Raisul Islam Asad	TV series	
2014	Selfie Maniac	Arefin Alom	FS Nayeem	Drama	
2014	Jiboner Joygaan		Kazi Asif Rahman	Drama	
2015	Ek Poshla Brishti	L R Shohel	Niloy Alamgir	Telefilm	
2015	Nil Chirkut Ebong Tumi	Mehedi Hasan Jonny	Afran Nisho	Valentine Special Drama	

=== Music videos ===
Year	Title	Artist(s)	Director	Notes	Ref(s)
2011	Ek Jibon	Shahid, Shubhamita Banerjee	Shimul Howlader	One of the biggest hits in 2011.	

=== Modeling ===
TV commercials

- Sunsilk Hair Shampoo (2005)
- Arku Gura Masala
- Pran Chatni
- Rexona
- Cute Beauty Shop
- Shourav Mehedi
- Danish Condensed Milk
- Apan Jewllers
- Tibet Fairness Cream
- Tibet Pomade Cream (2010)
- Tibet Pumpkin Hair Oil
- Racsun Television (2012)
- Parachute Bangladesh Advansed Hair Oil (2012)
- Chandan Facewash
- Fair & Care Fairness Cream

Magazine

- Splash Fashion Magazine, January (2014)
