= Jyotika Jyoti =

Bangladeshi actress

- Born: Mymensingh, Bangladesh
- Occupation: Actress
- Years active: 2004–present

Jyotika Jyoti is a Bangladeshi actress known for her roles in films such as Ayna (2005), Rabeya, Jibondhuli and Anil Bagchir Ekdin (2015). She gained public attention for her political activities during the 2024 quota reform movement in Bangladesh, when she was associated with a WhatsApp group of pro-Awami League artists. In 2025, she was named in a murder case filed over the death of a protester during the 2024 uprising.

== Early life ==
Jyotika Jyoti was born in Mymensingh, Bangladesh. She completed her postgraduate degree in English literature from Anandamohon University College.

== Career ==
Jyoti's first film, Ayna, directed by Kabori Sarwar, was released in 2005. The next two important releases were Nondito Noroke by Belal Ahmed and Rabeya by Tanvir Mokammel. Later she acted in Tanvir Mokammel's film Jibondhuli and Azad Kalam's Bedeni. Jyoti also acted in a number of short films. Her first short film named Break Up was in 2010. She acted in seven short films till 2019. In 2015, she appeared in Morshedul Islam's Anil Bagchir Ekdin as Atoshi, Anil's sister. Jyoti starred in Grash, production of which began in 2013. It was released in 2017.

Jyotika Jyoti took a stand for the government during the repression of the Awami League government on the students in the quota reform movement that took place in 2024. During the movement, a group of pro-Awami artists, including Jyotika Jyoti, were active against the movement in a WhatsApp group called 'Alo Ashbei' led by actor Ferdous. After the non-cooperation movement, on September 3, 2024, some screenshots related to that WhatsApp group were spread on social media. In September 2024, she was removed from Bangladesh Shilpakala Academy.

In April 2025, a murder case was filed against Jyoti and 16 other actors over the death of a protester in Vatara during the Anti-Discrimination Student Movement against the Awami League government led by Prime Minister Sheikh Hasina. Detective Branch arrested her on 18 December 2026 ahead of a "lockdown" announced by the party. The arrest was part of a wider police operation in which 537 people, including 107 Awami League members and activists, including Nurul Islam Nahid, were arrested across Dhaka within 24 hours.
