= Sraboner Meghgulo Joro Holo Akashe =

1987 song by Different Touch

Single by Different Touch
- Language: Bengali
- Released: 1987
- Label: Electro Voice
- Songwriter: Ashraf Babu
- Composer: Ashraf Babu
- Producer: Ashraf Babu

'Sraboner Meghgulo Joro Holo Akashe (Bengali: শ্রাবণের মেঘগুলো জড়ো হলো আকাশে, lit. 'The clouds of Srabon gathered in the sky'), also known simply as Sraboner Megh (Bengali: শ্রাবণের মেঘ, lit. 'Monsoon cloud'), is a Bengali song by the Bangladeshi rock band Different Touch. Written, composed, and produced by Ashraf Babu in 1987, the song was first performed by vocalist Ali Ahmed Babu and later appeared on the band's debut album. It is widely regarded as one of the band's signature songs and one of the best-known Bangladeshi rock ballads of the late 1980s.

== Background ==
The song was written during the Bengali month of Srabon in 1987. At the time, Different Touch had already completed eleven songs for its debut album, which was planned as a twelve-track release. While travelling from Khulna to Dhaka for the album's recording sessions, lyricist and composer Ashraf Babu was inspired by four consecutive days of monsoon rainfall and wrote both the lyrics and melody during the journey.

The following morning, the song was recorded in the Malibagh area of Dhaka together with the remaining tracks for the album. According to Borhan Biswas of Bhorer Kagoj, Shelley and Chandan of the band Winning contributed to the song's instrumentation and production. After its release, Electro Voice selected the song for broadcast on Bangladesh Television, contributing to its nationwide popularity.

== Performances ==
The song has been associated with several anecdotes involving rainfall during live performances. According to band members, during a concert at Selim Al Deen Muktamanch at Jahangirnagar University in 1991, heavy rain began shortly after the performance started. A similar incident reportedly occurred during another performance of the song at the same venue the following year.

== Legacy ==
The song has remained one of Different Touch's best-known recordings and is regularly associated with the Bengali month of Srabon because of its lyrics and monsoon imagery. It continues to receive radio, television, and digital media airplay decades after its release.

In April 2026, musician Fuad Al Muqtadir included a newly arranged version of the song, performed by Elita Karim, in his Touch of Gold project, which reinterpreted classic Bangladeshi band songs for a contemporary audience.

In July 2026, the song experienced a major resurgence in popularity after it was used in a Facebook Reel posted by Beauty Rani Paul, a government primary school headteacher in Fenchuganj Upazila, Sylhet District. The video became the subject of online criticism and cyberbullying after being reposted without permission in a misleading context. In response, teachers across Bangladesh began posting their own videos featuring the song in solidarity with Paul, transforming it into a symbol of protest against cyberbullying, gender-based harassment, and moral policing on social media.

The renewed attention also prompted public comments from Different Touch vocalist Misbah Rahman, who welcomed the song's use as a medium of solidarity while expressing support for teachers subjected to online harassment.
