= Vober Hat =

Bangladeshi drama television series

- Written by: Masum Reza
- Directed by: Salauddin Lavlu
- Starring: Humayun Faridi; ATM Shamsuzzaman; Wahida Mollick Jolly; Chanchal Chowdhury; Salauddin Lavlu; Fazlur Rahman Babu; Mosharraf Karim; Tania; Diti; Bonna Mirza
- Country of origin: Bangladesh
- Original language: Bengali
- No. of episodes: 106

Production
- Producer: Salauddin Lavlu
- Production locations: Dhaka, Gazipur
- Running time: 28 minutes

Original release
- Release: June 29, 2006

Vober Hat (Bengali: ভবের হাট) is a Bangladeshi drama television series written by Masum Reza and directed by Salauddin Lavlu. It has 106 episodes which ran on Channel i from 2006-2007. It has a rural setting, depicting colourful lifestyles of a rural village. This drama stars Humayun Faridi, ATM Shamsuzzaman, Wahida Mollick Jolly, Chanchal Chowdhury, Salauddin Lavlu, Fazlur Rahman Babu, Mosharraf Karim, Tania, Diti and Bonna Mirza.

== Plot ==
Vober Hat is a story situated in the village of Vobhodia and the play follows the story of two brothers, Harem Kha and Marem Kha, who have cut off all ties for 25 years over a trivial incident. These two brothers have not talked or looked at each other for 25 years, so instead they both use their own workers to talk to each other. (Nata is the worker for Marem Kha and Adiluddin is the worker for Harem Kha.)

Harem Kha (the younger brother) and his wife Angoori have two daughters, Goina and Ayna. Goina and Ayna are both college students, but as the elder sister, Goina has failed her final exams one after the other for two years. To stop Goina from failing any more, Harem Kha hires his relative Fiza to tutor his two daughters, plus Khushboo who also attends their College. Fiza is widely known around the whole village for being a Champion Tutor, but, only for females. So Fiza soon enough falls in deep love with Goina, but the third student, Khushboo falls even deeper for Fiza, very secretly.

Marem Kha (the older brother) has two sons, Bhashan Kha and Ashan Kha. Marem Kha was married, but his wife had passed when his two sons were young. Bhashan Kha is the older brother out of the two siblings, and is the only person in the whole village of Vobhodia to ever go to University. Roomali is the younger sister of Marem Kha and Harem Kha, but she lives at Marem Kha's house. Roomali's Husband had left Roomali (later returned in the story), but Roomali is not forgetting her husband so easily and she often goes out aimlessly looking for him.

However, the two brothers' offspring seek a family reunion and Bhashan Kha falls in love with the elder sister, Goina and Ashan Kha falls for the younger sister, Ayna. Harem Kha and Marem Kha find out that something is happening between their kids and are both determined to split them using threats, rules and even spying on each other's children.

There are another two important houses in this story, which is coachar Mama's house and Carbala Kaka's house. The greatly respected coachar Mama is the local football coach and once coached the two brothers Marem Kha and Harem Kha. coachar Mama lives with his elder Son, Toofa, his younger daughter, Khushboo and his brother-in-law Shada Miya. coachar Mama was also married but his wife died after giving birth to Khushboo. Tofa's is important character of this drama. He is a Music Teacher and he also only teaches females. So following Fisa, Tofa falls in love with Goyna's younger sibling Ayna. But here too there is a love triangle. Carbala Kaka's daughter Nokshi is deeply in love with Tofa.

Neighbouring coachar Mama's house is indeed Carbala Kaka's house. Carbala Kaka's house consists of his sister, Gole, his two young children, Dola and Kala and his older daughter, Nokshi, who also attends the same college as Goyna. And again, Carbala Kaka's wife died many years ago.

The story goes on slowly like this but one man interrupts the story and turns it upside down. Into the story two important new characters enter, and they are Dhobola and "Jotish" Baba Huzur. Dhobola is a sweet young girl who lives in the nearby village with her maid Mahela. She is also a student and is studying for her final exams therefore a tutor would help her. Fiza is the only tutor, so he accepts Dhobola's plea, which ends up being a demand. As like many of the women in the village, Dhobola falls for Fiza, causing even more tension for Fiza.

The "Jotish" is known as the 'Fortune teller'. He is believed to have supernatural powers of controlling the Sun and the Moon which help him to gain the hearts of the people of Vobhodia. He ends up becoming very close to the Kha brothers. They often argue about who's the one responsible for the Jotish in the village. But the people of Vobhodia are unaware of what kind of evil Jotish Baba is planning.

== Cast ==
- Humayun Faridi as Harem Kha
- ATM Shamsuzzaman as Marem Kha
- Wahida Mollick Jolly as Anguri Begum, wife of Harem Kha
- Diti as Roomali, sister of Harem Kha and Marem Kha
- Mosharraf Karim as Bhashan Kha
- Bonna Mirza as Goyna Parveen
- Bobby as Ayna Parveen
- Shamim Hassan as Ashan Kha
- Sazzad Reza as Ashan Kha (Role)
- Salauddin Lavlu as Tofa Sheikh
- Farzana Chobi as Nokshi
- Fazlur Rahman Babu as Shada Miya
- Tania Ahmed as Golejaan
- Chanchal Chowdhury as Fiza
- Rasheda Chowdhury as Muntaha
- Mita Noor as Dhobola
- Nojor Ali as Pran Rai
- Dr.Ezazul Islam as "Jotish Huleman Boksh" Baba Huzur
- Rahmat Ali as Mofa Cochar or Guruji
- Hosne Ara Putul as Khushboo
- Ahsanul Haque Minu as Karbala Lathial
- AKM Hasan as Adiludin
- Shamim Zaman as Nata
- Shamima Tushti as Miss Mahela
- Manshi Shah as Miss Rahela
- Nahid as Kala
- Nurunnobi as Dhola

== Shooting location ==
Khotib Khamar (House) Bari, Hotapara, Gazipur, Dhaka, Bangladesh.
