= Selim Al Deen =

Bangladeshi playwright and theatre artist

- সেলিম আল দীন
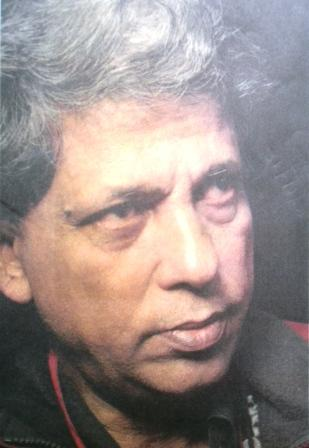
- Deen in 2006
- Born: Mianudin; 18 August 1949; Feni District, East Bengal, Dominion of Pakistan
- Died: 14 January 2008 (aged 58); Dhaka, Bangladesh
- Resting place: Jahangirnagar University campus
- Education: Jahangirnagar University; University of Dhaka
- Spouse: Begumzadi Meherunnesa Selim
- Awards: full list

Muhamed Mianudin Ahmed (18 August 1949 – 14 January 2008) was a Bangladeshi playwright and theatre artist. He was the founder chairperson of the Department of Drama and Dramatics at Jahangirnagar University. He was awarded Bangla Academy Literary Award in 1984 and Ekushey Padak in 2007 by the Government of Bangladesh for his contribution to theatre and won the Independence Award in 2023 for his contribution to the field of literature.

== Early life and education ==
Muhamed Mianudin Ahmed was born on 18 August 1949 to Mofizuddin Ahmed and Firoza Khatun in the village of Senerkhil in Sonagazi, Feni, then part of the Noakhali district of East Bengal. He was the third of their seven siblings. He assumed this pen name later. His school life started in 1954. He travelled with his father to different parts of the country and received education in many institutions as his father was doing a transferable government job in the department of Customs and Excise. He passed matriculation examination in 1964 from Mongal Kandi Bohu Mukhi High School and ISc from Feni College in 1966.

In 1967, he was admitted to the University of Dhaka to study Bengali literature. But later he graduated from the Karatia College, Tangail. He came back to the University of Dhaka and obtained his MA degree from the Bengali Department. In 1995, he earned his PhD from Jahangirnagar University. His first job was in an advertising firm as a copywriter. In 1974, he joined Jahangirnagar University as a lecturer. He married Begaumjadi Meherunnisa Parul the same year.

== Theater debut ==
Deen was attracted to reading literary works at a very young age. As he turned on to admit into Dhaka University in 1966, he decided to become a career writer. In the early years, Deen wanted to be a poet and published some of poems he composed. But soon he realised that poetry was not his cup of tea. It was his instructor and a playwright Munier Chowdhury who encouraged him to focus attention on drama. First he started reading plays and study the life of playwrights. Then he started to write plays himself. He wrote his first drama in 1968 while still a university-student. His first radio play was Biporit Tomosay ('On the other side of Darkness') was broadcast in 1969. He wrote a play for Bangladesh Television styled Librium (later renamed Ghoom Nei) which was broadcast in 1970. His first play for the theatre was Shorpo bishoyok golpo (tr. Story about snakes') was staged in 1972.

Deen's close study of European culture is reflected in his initial plays. His earlier works including Sharpa Bishawak Galpo, Jondis o Bibidho Balloon, O Mul Shomoshya, Karim Bawali'r Shotru o Mul Mukh Dekha, Charkakrar Documentary were cast in European format.

However soon he realised that the tales of rural farmers are no less heroic than the Herculean feats of Achilles or Prometheus. This realisation was imbibed in him by his predecessor Natyaguru Nurul Momen. He changed his mindset and diverted his attention to the lives of his countrymen.

== Career ==
Deen carried out extensive research for his doctoral dissertation in which he proved that the history of Bengali drama is older than that of European drama. He moved earth and heaven to collect data in support of his thesis. During 1977 to 1979, Selim Al-Deen studied Bengali Jatra which prompted him to write his first unique drama Kittonkhola. The success of Kittonkhola instilled in him enormous confidence that using tradition as the foundation was pregnant with success.

Deen's subsequent works, namely Bashon, Atotai, Saifulmulk Badiuzzaman, Keramat Mangal, Hat Hodai and Chaka followed the pattern of epic realism which he inaugurated in Bengali culture. In the early 1990s, he introduced a new genre, kathya-natya (talk-play), derived from folk traditions. It focuses on common people among the colonized, is a fusion of multiple forms of literary and artistic expression (such as play, poem, song, dance, and storytelling), and uses only the more limited punctuation of precolonial Bengali. He used this new style in his dramas like Joiboti Koinnar Mon and Hargaaz.

=== Dhaka Theatre ===
Deen was one of the founding members of Dhaka Theatre which is a leading theatre group of the country and rendered vital contribution in advancing the progressive drama movement. Notably, Dhaka Theatre staged almost all of Selim's plays. He and his fellow artists ran the theatre movement across rural Bangladesh to popularise the culture in rural areas of Bangladesh.

== Achievements ==
Since the 1980s, Deen has played a pivotal role in the theatre movement of Bangladesh. Apart from his active involvement with Dhaka Theatre, his fundamental contribution was introduction of a novel sense of direction to modern Bengali Drama, based on tradition. Al-Deen has also been one of the key organisers of Bangladesh's village theatre movement. He took the monumental task of creating the only dictionary on dramatics available in Bengali. Having been awarded almost all national recognitions possible in the field of theatre, Deen's work is studied at many universities across the world. Several of his plays have been translated into other languages. They have been staged outside Bangladesh too. In fact, he is one of few Bangladeshi writers to have his plays staged by West Bengal troupes. He helped to build the Dramatics department of Jahangirnagar University and involved there as a teacher for 30 years.

Deen secured mass popularity when his plays were broadcast through television. Some of his notable television serials include Granthikgan Kahey and Chhaya Shikari.

Deen's play Nishwora Bhalobasha aired on Bangladesh Television on 2 January 2005 was achieved immediate popularity. The main cast was Shahriar Nazim Joy, Dipa Khondokar, Mamnun Emon, Kumkum Hassan and Anuja. The play was directed by Nayeem Imtiaz Nayemul.

== Works ==
=== Books ===
Deen's books include Jaundice and various balloons (1975), Muntaser Fantashi (1976), Shakuntala (1977), Kitton Khola (1978–80), Bashon (1985), Keramatmangal (1985), Hat Hadai (1988), Chaka (1991), Hargoj (1993) Ekti Marma Rupkatha (1992), Jaibotir Konnar Mon (1992), Bonopungshul (1996), Prachcho (1998) and Nimojjan (2004). He published two poetry collections, Kobi O Timir (1990) and Swapna Ramanigan (2007). His only novel is titled Amrita Upkshan. He compiled the seminal theatre dictionary Bangla Natyakosh. His plays are included in the textbook curricula of the University of Dhaka and Jahangirnagar University, Jadavpur University and Rabindra Bharati University.

=== Ronger Manush ===
Serial drama Ronger Manush was written by Selim Al Deen jointly with Masum Reza. The story of rural life ran for 111 episodes on NTV.

=== Chaka in the USA and India ===
Chaka by Deen premiered in 1990 at the Antioch College, Yellow Springs, Ohio, United States. It was translated into English as The Wheel by Syed Jamil Ahmed and adapted by Steve Friedman. The play was jointly directed by Syed Jamil Ahmed and Denny Partridge. Inspired by its success, Denny Partridge directed The Wheel again at Barnard's Minor Latham Playhouse, in New York City on 13, 14 and 15 November 2003. The cast featured Ian Anthony, Ann Cheung, Samantha Debicki, Ariana Getz, Oscar Olivo, Lindsay Strachan, Chloe Waters-Wallace, Matt Wilstein and Jessica Valadez. In 2006, Syed Jamil Ahmed directed the play in Hindi (titled Pahiye) at the National School of Drama, New Delhi, India.

=== Films ===
Kittonkhola was made into a film in 2000. Directed by Abu Sayeed, the film was adapted from the stage play written by Deen. Featuring Raisul Islam Asad and Naila Azad Nupur, the film brought to light the lives of jatra artistes and their struggles to make a living off the dying performing art.

=== Unfinished projects ===
As many as six plays written by Deen are available which remain to be staged. Before his death, he was working on a new play styled Haar-Haddi ('Pile of Bones') that remains unfinished. He conceived of establishing a World Cultural Centre in Dhaka, his dream project.

== Awards ==
- Bangla Academy Literary Award (1984)
- Kathak Sahitya Puroshkar (2002)
- Nandikaar Puroshkar (1994)
- Best Tele-playwright Award (1994)
- National Cinema Award for best dialogue (1994)
- Khaleqdad Chowdhury Sahitya Puroshkar (2001)
- Ekushey Padak (2007)
- Alokta Sahitya Puroshaker (2007)
- Munier Chowdhury Sammanona by Theatre (2003)

== Death and legacy ==
Deen died at Labaid Cardiac Hospital in Dhaka on 14 January 2008 after being admitted to hospital following a cardiac attack on 11 January. The same day he was scheduled to be flown to Thailand for a better medical care. He had been suffering from heart disease, high blood pressure, kidney and diabetic problems. He was given life support as his condition deteriorated quickly and became critical.

After janaza at different places, he was buried on 16 January 2008 at a graveyard near the Jahangirnagar University central mosque.

The road to his village home in Senerkhil has been named after him. The road is known as Selim Al Deen Road that connected Notun Bazar and Darograr Hat. A government primary school has also been named after him and his mother. The school is located in front of his village residence.

The Selim Al Deen Muktamanch at Jahangirnagar University was named after him.

=== Sexual misconduct allegation ===
During the height of Me Too movement, a former student of Deen, Musfiqa Laizu, came out and accused him of sexually exploiting students.
