= Tazin Ahmed =

Bangladeshi actress and journalist

Tajin Ahmed
- তাজিন আহমেদ
- Born: 30 July 1975; Noakhali, Bangladesh
- Died: 22 May 2018 (aged 42); Dhaka, Bangladesh
- Education: University of Dhaka
- Occupations: Journalist, actress, playwright, director
- Years active: 1996–2018
- Spouses: Ezaz Munna; Rumi Rahman
- Family: Dilara Zaman (aunt)

Tazin Ahmed (30 July 1975 – 22 May 2018) was a Bangladeshi journalist, actress, playwright, director, and theater person. She won the 2003 Bachasas Award for the Best Actress in the drama category.

== Early life and education ==
Ahmed was born on 30 July 1972, in Noakhali, Bangladesh, to Dilara Jolly and Kamal Uddin Ahmed (d. 1979). She completed her Higher Secondary School Certificate (HSC) in 1992. She graduated from the mass communication and journalism department of the University of Dhaka.

== Career ==
=== Journalism ===
In 1994, Ahmed joined the newspaper Bhorer Kagoj. In 1997, she started working with Prothom Alo and became a staff reporter in 1998. She worked also as a columnist for Anondo Bhubon and as a freelance contributor to Bangla Bazar magazine. In 2002, she joined Mercantile Bank Limited as a public relations officer.

=== Acting ===
In 1996, Ahmed made her debut in the small screen through the single episode television drama Shesh Dekha Shesh Noy, directed by Sheikh Niamat Ali. Alongside she became associated with the theatre group Natyojon. In 2000, she joined another theatre group named Aronyak. She scripted around 12 plays and directed a few of them. She started her television presentation in 1991 with the program title of Chetna for Bangladesh Television. In 1997, she played in a number of plays for theater. Later, Aranyak acted in the drama Mayur Singhanshan. She wrote the screenplay of Doll's House.

She started working as a program executive at NTV in 2003. Since 2016, she hosted the television show 71 er Shokaal on Ekattor TV. Her last televised tele-fiction was Noashal, directed by Mir Sabbir.

== Personal life and death ==
Ahmed was first married to Ejaz Munna, a television director. She later married the musician Rumi Rahman. Actress Dilara Zaman is her paternal aunt, her father's elder sister.

Ahmed suffered from asthma. She died of a heart attack on 22 May 2018 at Regent Hospital in Uttara, Dhaka. Her body was taken for viewing to Kashimpur Women's Central Jail where her mother, Dilara Jolly, had been sentenced and later she was buried beside her father's grave in Banani Graveyard.

== Works ==
=== Television drama ===
- Shesh Dekha Shesh Noy (1996)
- Adekha Bhubon (2004)
- Utsho (2007)
- Nolbaji (2007)
- Poroshpor (2008)
- The Family (2009)
- Bar Bar Phirey Ashey (2009)
- O Bondhu Amar (2009)
- Fifty 50 (2010)
- Maa (2013)
- Noashal (2014)
- Tomar Khola Haowa
- Saptarshi
- Atopor Bibaho Barshiki
- Shat Paure Kabya
- Ek Akasher Tara

=== Television show ===
- Shandhikhon (2006)
- 71 er Shokaal
