= Sakin Sarisuri =

- Genre: Drama serial
- Written by: Brindaban Das
- Directed by: Salauddin Lavlu
- Starring: Kazi Anisul Haque Borun; Nazmul Huda Bachchu; Golam Farida Chhanda; Chanchal Chowdhury; Azizul Hakim; Rawnak Hasan; Wahida Mallik Jolly; Mosharraf Karim; Mamunur Rashid; Masum Aziz
- Country of origin: Bangladesh
- Original language: Bengali
- No. of episodes: 102

Production
- Producer: Salauddin Lavlu
- Production locations: Pubail, Gazipur Sadar Upazila, Bangladesh
- Running time: 24 minutes (episode)

Original release
- Network: Channel i
- Release: 27 January 2009 – 2010

Sakin Sarisuri (Bengali: সাকিন সারিসুরি) is a Bangladeshi drama television series that aired on Channel i from January 27, 2009, to 2010. It was written by Brindaban Das and directed by Salauddin Lavlu, and has 102 episodes.

The series is set on a village where thieves reside, and is home to Muslims, Hindus, and Christians who all live in harmony. Eventually, the village runs into a conflict when the daughter of Mondol, a local 'godfather', falls in love with a thief.

== Cast ==
- Mosharraf Karim as Ruiton
- Masum Aziz as Moga Sardar
- Nazmul Huda Bachchu as Shadan Das
- Golam Farida Chhanda as Basonti Rani
- Chanchal Chowdhury as Japan Doctor
- AKM Hasan as Ranju
- Azizul Hakim as Guru Das
- Rawnak Hasan as Golam
- Wahida Mollick Jolly as Kohinoor Begum
- Shatabdi Wadud as Hasu
- Ahsanul Haque Minu as Hannan
- Masuma Mithi as Kasturi
- Mamunur Rashid as Mondol
- Sanarei Debi Shanu as Niba Rani
- Rista Laboni Shimana as Kakoli
- Silvi Ajmeri Chadni as Sonali
- Kazi Anisul Haque Borun as Mannan
- Habibur Rahman Modhu as Jongson
- Masud Rana Mithu as Hannan
- M M Morshed as Rowshan
- Selina Akther Shikha as Shefali
- Muntasir Saju as Reegan
- Kanta Zaman as Putul
- Dilip Chakrabarty as Premanannda
- Shahnaz Khushi as Hena

== Production ==
The serial was filmed in Bhadun, Pubail, at that time a rural area in Gazipur Sadar Upazila.

== Themes ==
According to the director:

An important aspect of the serial is solidarity among people in a multi-religious community. We often witness shameless use of religion to create divide among people in our country and elsewhere. This issue has to be addressed.

— Salauddin Lavlu
