= Wahida Mollick Jolly =

Bangladeshi actress

- ওয়াহিদা মল্লিক জলি
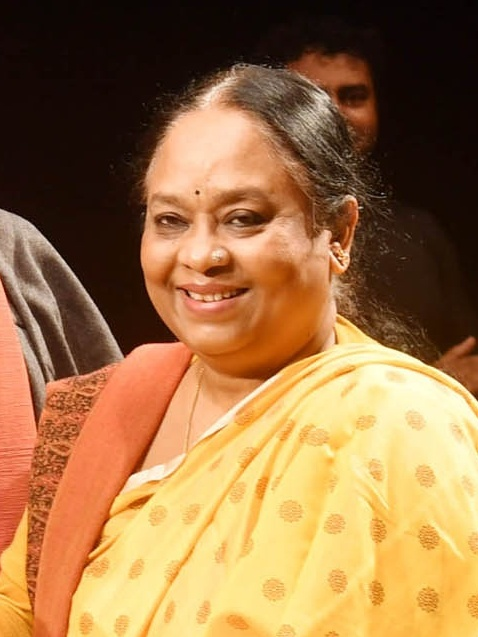
- Wahida Mollick Jolly in 2021.
- Occupations: Actress, costume designer. Faculty, Department of Theatre & Performance Studies, University Of Dhaka.
- Spouse: Rahmat Ali
- Children: 2
- Relatives: Sharmili Ahmed (sister)

Wahida Mollick Jolly is a Bangladeshi actress. She works on stage plays, television dramas and films. She won Bangladesh National Film Award for Best Costume Design for the film Mrittika Maya (2013).

== Background ==
Jolly's parents settled in Rajshahi from West Bengal. Her father, Tofazzal Hossain, was a stage performer and director. Her elder sister Sharmili Ahmed was an actress. Jolly performed regularly as a child artist in radio dramas. She started stage performances in tenth grade. She earned a degree in social work and then moved to Kolkata to study drama in Rabindra Bharati University. She debuted in a Hindi television series.

== Career ==
Jolly debuted her stage acting career in 1975 by her role in Spartacus Bishoyok Jotilota, written by Momtazuddin Ahmed. Her debut television drama, E Ki Jalaton, also by Momtazuddin Ahmed, was in 1986.

Jolly acted in films including Adhiar (2003) and Shorgo Theke Norok.

Jolly established a theatre group Drishwakabbo in 1990. She is a faculty member of the Department of Theatre and Performance Studies at University of Dhaka. Her husband Rahmat Ali is also an Associate Professor of the Department at Theatre and Performance Studies of Dhaka University.

== Works ==
=== Television ===
- Ronger Manush (2004-2005)
- Vober Hat
- Doll's House
- Sakin Sarisuri
- Jhamela Unlimited
- Ujan Ganger Naiya
- Labonyoprobha

=== Filmography ===
- Lalon (2004)
- Molla Barir Bou (2005)
- Daruchini Dip (2007)
- Mon Diyechi Tomake (2009)
- Dubshatar (2010)
- Amar Bondhu Rashed (2011)
- Mrittika Maya (2013)
- Jibondhuli (2014)
- Swargo Theke Norok (2015)
- Ekti Cinemar Golpo (2018)

== Awards ==
- 32nd Bachsas Awards for Best Supporting Actress in Ronger Manush
- 38th Bangladesh National Film Awards for Best Costume Designer in Mrittika Maya
