= Shamima Nazneen =

Bangladeshi actress

- শামীমা নাজনীন
- Education: Eden College
- Occupations: Actress, director

Shamima Nazneen is a Bangladeshi film, stage, television actress and director. She was born at Gangkulpara Village, Achmita Union, Katiadi Upazilla in Kishoreganj District She won Meril Prothom Alo Award for Best Actress for her role in the film Ghetuputra Komola (2012).

== Education and career ==
Nazneen earned her master's degree in physics from Eden College in 1994. She got involved in acting through the theater troupe Nagarik Natya Sampradaya in 1996.

== Works ==
Acting

=== Films ===
- Srabon Megher Din (1999)
- Dui Duari (2001)
- Shyamol Chhaya (2005)
- Ghetuputra Komola (2012)
- Pita - The Father (2012)
- Chorabali (2012)
- Mon Bojhena (2025)
- Bonolota Express (2026)

=== Serial Dramas ===
- Kala Koitor
- Ekla Pakhi
- Friendbook (2021–2022)
- Bachelor point

=== Dramas ===
- Somudro Bilash Private Limited
- Nitu Tomay Bhalobashi
- Bonur Golpo

Direction

- Package Sangbad
- Somudro Bilash Private Limited (assistant direction)
