= Shanto-Mariam University of Creative Technology =

Private university in Dhaka, Bangladesh

- Type: Private
- Established: 2003
- Chairman: Md. Imamul Kabir Shanto
- Chancellor: President Mirza Fakhrul Islam Alamgir
- Vice-Chancellor: Md. Shah-E-Alam
- Location: Plot# 06, Road/Avenue# 06, Sector# 17/H-1, Uttara, 1230, Dhaka, 1230, Bangladesh; 23.8740°N 90.3905°E
- Campus: Urban
- Website: smuct.edu.bd

Shanto-Mariam University of Creative Technology (SMUCT) (Bengali: শান্ত-মরিয়ম সৃজনশীল প্রযুক্তি বিশ্ববিদ্যালয়) is a private university established in 2003 in Dhaka, Bangladesh. It was named after Md. Imamul Kabir Shanto (founder and chairman) and his wife Tahmina Chowdhury Kabir (Mariam) (founder and vice chairman).

== Academic programs ==
The academic programs of the university are conducted by three faculties.

=== Faculty of Design & Technology ===
- B.A. (Hons) Fashion Design & Technology
- B.A. (Hons) Apparel Manufacturing Management & Technology
- B.A. (Hons) Interior Architecture
- B.A. (Hons) Graphic Design & Multimedia
- Bachelor of Architecture

=== Faculty of Engineering & Technology ===
- B.Sc. (Hons) Computer Science & Information Technology
- B.Sc. (Hons) Computer Science & Engineering
- M.A. Fashion Design/Product Design
- M.A. Interior Design

=== Faculty of Fine & Performing Arts ===
- B.Fine Arts (Hons) and Diploma Drawing & Painting
- M.Fine Arts Drawing & Painting
- B.Music (Hons) Ravindra, Nazrul, Classical
- B.Music (Hons) Dance
- M.Music (Masters) Ravindra, Nazrul, Classical
- M.Music (Masters) Dance

=== Faculty of Management & General Studies ===
- Bachelor of Business Administration (BBA)
- Bachelor of Laws (LLB)
- B.A. (Hons) in English (language & literature)
- BSS (Hons) in Sociology & Anthropology
- MBA Product & Fashion Merchandising
- Master of Business Administration (MBA)
- Executive MB
- Master of Laws (LLM)
- M.A. in English
- M.A. in Islamic Studies
- M.A. in Bengali
- MSS in Government & Politics
- MSS in Sociology & Anthropology

== Shanto-Mariam Academy of Creative Technology ==
Logo of Shanto-Mariam Academy of Creative Technology

Shanto-Mariam Academy of Creative Technology teaches various programs, including design, performing arts, and technical education throughout the country. It is a sister concern of the university that focuses on:

- Art
- Music (Ravindra, Nazrul, Classical)
- Dance (Bharata Natyam, Kathak, Folk dance, Manipuri)
- Instrumental music (Tabla, Guitar, Violin)
- Correct Pronunciation
- Recitation
- Acting
- News reading

Diploma and certificate courses are offered in Fashion design, Interior design, Graphic design, Multimedia, and Music. The academy also offers vocational SSC in Automotive, Garment design & pattern cutting, and Interior with Auto CAD under the Open University. The academy also offers SSC and HSC programs for underprivileged students who are working.

== Shanto-Mariam Institute of Creative Technology ==
Logo of Shanto-Mariam Institute of Creative Technology

Shanto-Mariam Institute of Creative Technology, an education institute of the Shanto-Mariam Foundation, offers BTEC/Edexcel National and Higher National diplomas in the following subjects:

- Fashion design
- 3D design
- Graphic Design & Multimedia
- Clothing merchandising
- Information Technology
- BBA
- Apparel Merchandising
