= Adhiar =

Bangladeshi period drama film

- Adhiar movie poster
- Bengali: আধিয়ার
- Directed by: Saidul Anam Tutul
- Story by: Giasuddin Selim
- Starring: Raisul Islam Asad; Pijush Bandyopadhyay; Champa; Litu Anam
- Cinematography: Maksudul Bari
- Edited by: Saidul Anam Tutul
- Release date: 25 September 2003 (Bangladesh)
- Country: Bangladesh
- Language: Bengali

Adhiar (Bengali: আধিয়ার; also known by the English title The Battle of Sharecroppers) is a 2003 Bangladeshi period drama film directed by Saidul Anam Tutul (in his directorial debut) from a story written by Giasuddin Selim. It stars Raisul Islam Asad, Pijush Bandyopadhyay, Champa and Litu Anam in lead roles. The film is set in Bengal during the Tebhaga movement of the late 1940s.

Adhiar was made with financial support from the government. It premiered in a competition at the Bangladesh National Museum in Dhaka on 25 September 2003.

== Cast ==
- Raisul Islam Asad as Din Doyal
- Pijush Bandyopadhyay as Zamindar (landlord)
- ATM Shamsuzzaman as Nayeb (the zamindar's chief rent-collector)
- Champa as Zamindar's protoge
- Shilip Lincoln as Moti Banu
- Jayanta Chattopadhyay as Shamser Dada

== Accolades ==
At the 5th Meril-Prothom Alo Awards, Adhiar won the Critics Choice Award for Best Film and Tutul received the Critics Choice Award for Best Film Director. The 25th Bachsas Awards earned Tutul six awards: Best Film, Best Director, Best Screenplay, Best Art Direction, Best Editing, and Best Cameraman.

At the 28th Bangladesh National Film Awards, Selim won the Award for Best Story, and Maksudul Bari received the Award for Best Cinematography.
