= Different Touch =

Bangladeshi rock band

Different Touch ডিফারেন্ট টাচ
- Origin: Khulna, Bangladesh
- Genres: Pop rock; Blues rock (early)
- Years active: 1990–present
- Labels: Modhumita Productions Ltd; G-Series
- Members: Mejbah Rahman; Pial; Polash; Nayan
- Past members: Panna; Milon; Tasmin; Milan; Naim
- Website: different.touch

Different Touch is a Bangladeshi band formed in the early 1990s in Khulna by Balaam.

Different Touch performed soft rock and blues and became known for songs such as Drishti Prodip, Sraboner Megh, and Bhalobashar Tanpura. The band became inactive in the late 1990s after three of its members moved abroad permanently, and vocalist Misbah took over his family's business in Khulna following his father's death.

Different Touch made a comeback in 2013, 16 years after the release of its fourth album, Proshno, in 1997. The title of the upcoming fifth album had not yet been finalised, but recording of most of the ten songs had been completed, according to vocalist and band leader Misbah Rahman, widely known simply as Misbah.

== Members ==
=== Current members ===
- Misbah Rahman (vocals, lyrics, composition; former vocalist of Warfaze)
- Pial (bass guitar, lyrics, composition)
- Polash (guitar)
- Nayan (keyboard)
- Tanvir (drums)

=== Former members ===
- Panna (lead guitar)
- Milon (drums)
- Tasmin (lead guitar)
- Milan (bass guitar)
- Naim (keyboard)

== Discography ==
=== Studio albums ===
- Different Touch: Volume One (ডিফারেন্ট টাচ ১ম খন্ড) (1990)
- Sraboner Megh (Monsoon Cloud) (1991)
- Shajano Prithibi (Gifted Earth) (1993)
- Proshno (Question) (1997)

=== Compilation albums ===
- Abeg (আবেগ) (1993)
