= Redoan Rony =

Bangladeshi filmmaker, producer and storywriter

- রেদওয়ান রনি
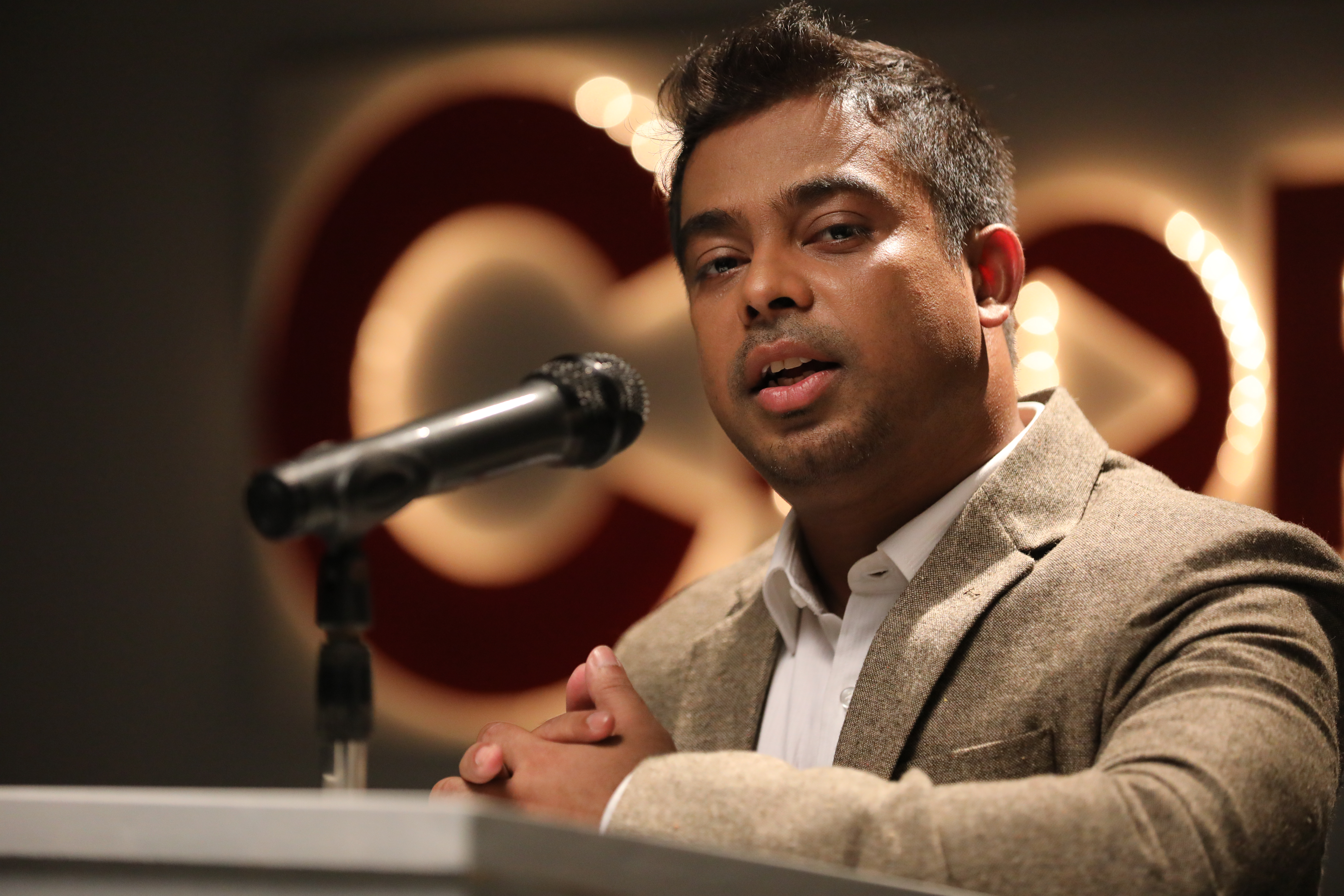
- Rony in 2021
- Born: October 20, 1983 (age 42); Pabna, Bangladesh
- Citizenship: Bangladeshi
- Education: East West University
- Occupations: Film director; story writer; producer
- Awards: Bangladesh National Film Awards

Redoan Rony is a Bangladeshi film director, producer and media executive who is the chief executive officer of Chorki. He has spent more than a decade in the media industry of Bangladesh. He has directed a few of the most popular TV series of Bangladesh e.g. Housefull (2008), FnF (2010), Behind The Scene (2011). He won Meril-Prothom Alo Awards for Best TV Director and Screenplay writer for the Television drama Pata Jhorar Din (2018). He won Bangladesh National Film Award for Best Dialogue and the film won 5 National Award for his directorial debut film Chorabali (2012).

He won the Meril-Prothom Alo Awards for Best Web Series for the series Shaaticup (2022), also in same category he won the CJFB Performance Award for Best Web Series for the series Myself Allen Swapan (2023) and the same award won in Best Webfilm category for the film Something Like an Autobiography (2023) which are received jointly with Nusrat Imrose Tisha. He won CJFB Performance Award for Outstanding Contribution to Television & Media with the OTT platform Chorki in 2023. He won the Meril-Prothom Alo Awards for Best Web Series for the web series Gulmohor (2025) and won the BIFA Awards for Best Film Actor for the film Domm: Until The Last Breath (2026).

== Career ==
In his early career, Rony worked with Mostofa Sarwar Farooki as an assistant director in Chabial Team. He and his friend Iftekhar Ahmed Fahmi joined the Chobial group in 2004. From there he learned filmmaking and direction, their first work together was a serial of Mostofa Sarwar Farooki called "69" which aired in Channel i. After that, Rony made a lot of television fiction and series. He also was an assistant director in the 2006 movie Made In Bangladesh. His first TV Movie he directed as a main director was Urojahaj, way back in 2005. From there he never turned back, and in 2012, he directed his first full-length film Chorabali, starring Indraneil Sengupta. His directorial debut film Chorabali went on to win Bangladesh National Film Award in five categories. Then, he made his Second Feature film Ice Cream (2016).

== Works ==
=== Feature film ===
Key
†	Denotes films that have not yet been released

Year	Film	Director	Writer	Producer	Notes	Ref.
2006	Made in Bangladesh	No	No	No	As an assistant director	
2012	Chorabali	Yes	Yes	No	Won – Bangladesh National Film Award for Best Dialogue; Won – Bachsas Award for Best Story	
2016	Ice Cream	Yes	Yes	Yes		
2026	Domm: Until The Last Breath	Yes	No	Yes	Won – BIFA Awards for Best Film Director	

=== Television ===
Year	Series	Credits	Notes	Ref.
2004	69	Assistant director	Drama serial on Channel i	
2005	Urojahaj: A Journey by Plane	Director	Debut as a director; TV film	
2008–2009	House Full	Director, creator and writer	Drama serial on NTV	
2010	FnF	Director, creator and writer	Drama serial on NTV	
2011	Behind The Scene	Director, story and screenwriter	Drama serial on NTV	
2018	Pata Jhorar Din	Director and writer	Won – Meril-Prothom Alo Awards for Best TV Director and Screenplay; drama film on Channel i	
2019	Behind The Puppy	Director and screenwriter	Drama serial on NTV	
2019	Ushnotar Notun Golpo	Director	Short film series on iflix; segment: Blood Rose	
2022	Shaaticup	Producer	Won – Meril-Prothom Alo Awards for Best Web Series	
2023	Myself Allen Swapan	Producer	Won – CJFB Performance Award for Best Web Series	
2023	Something Like an Autobiography	Producer	Won – CJFB Performance Award for Best Webfilm	
2025	Gulmohor	Producer	Won – Meril-Prothom Alo Awards for Best Web Series; released on Chorki	
