= Salahuddin Lavlu =

Bangladeshi actor (born 1962)

- সালাহউদ্দিন লাভলু
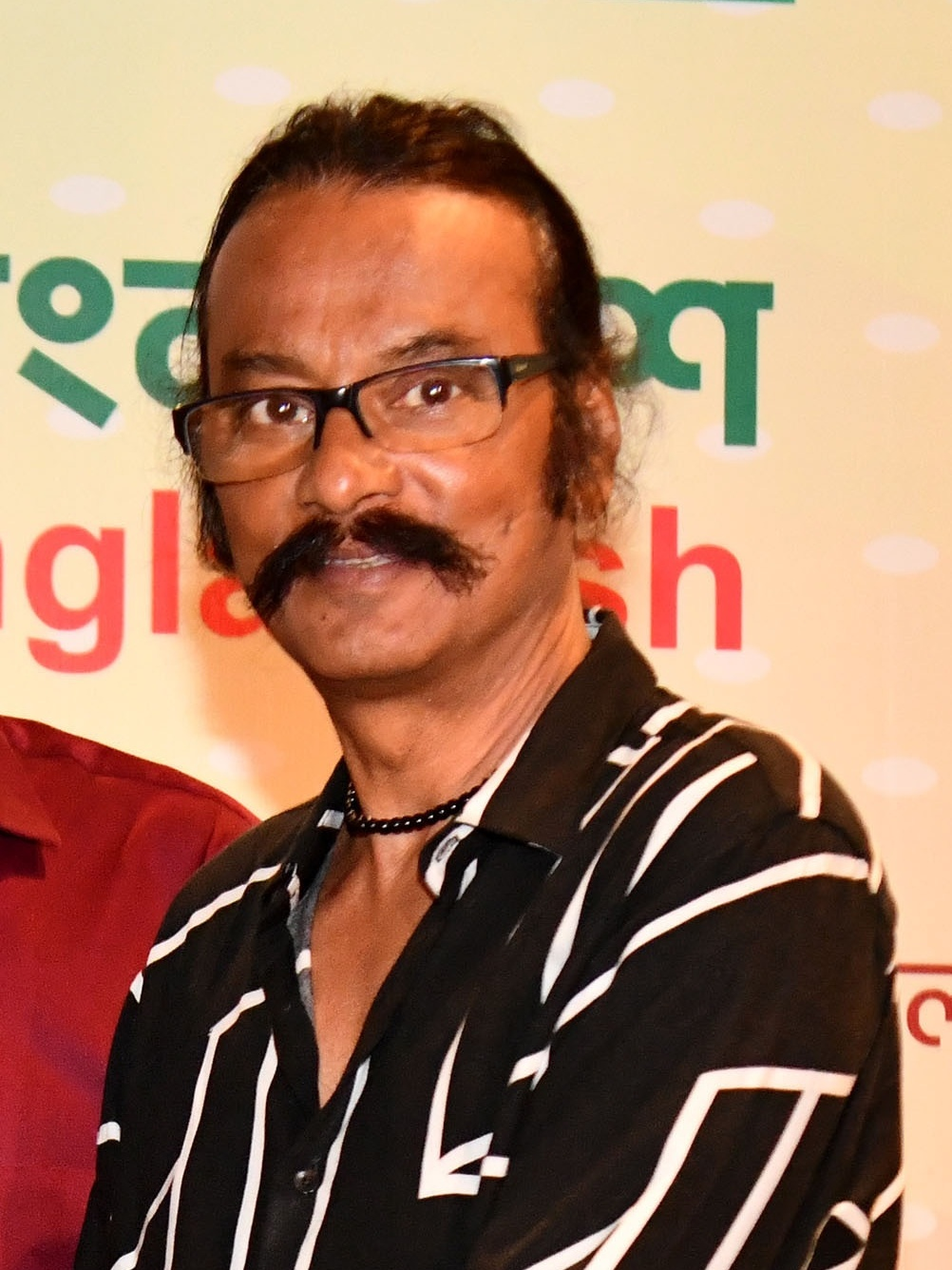
- Lavlu in 2023
- Born: Lavlu; 24 January 1962 (age 64); Kushtia, Khulna, East Pakistan, Pakistan
- Occupations: Actor, screenwriter and television film director
- Years active: 1985–present
- Spouse: Farzana Rowshan
- Children: 2

Salahuddin Lavlu (born 24 January) is a Bangladeshi television film director, actor, and screenwriter. His works generally consist of single episode television dramas and telenovelas. His notable works include Ronger Manush (2004), Vober Hat (2007), Ghor Kutum (2008), Alta Sundori (2009) and Sakin Sarisuri (2009), Har Kipte (2011), Kobuliotnama (2015), The Village Engineer (2016), Shonar Pakhi Rupar Pakhi (2017) and Priyo Din Priyo Raat (2018). Salahuddin Lavlu is the president of the Directors Guild.

== Early life ==
Salahuddin Lavlu was born in Jugia village, near Kushtia town of Kushtia District in the Khulna Division of western Bangladesh.

== Career ==
=== Acting and directing ===
Lavlu made his Television film directorial debut with Koitob, written by Masum Reza. Among the critically acclaimed television drama he directed by 2004 are Dichakrojaan (1997), Gahargachi (1997), Ekjon Aynal Lashkar (1999), Adhuli (2002) and Gor (2002).

== Filmography ==
=== Film ===
Filmography of Salahuddin Lavlu
Title	Year	Credited as		Notes	Ref.
Title	Year	Director	Role	Notes	Ref.
Molla Barir Bou	2005	Yes	–	Lux-Channel i Performance Awards Best Director, 2005	
Laal Sobuj	2005	Shahidul Islam Khokon	Actor		
Dukkhini Zohora	2007	Azizur Rahman	Actor		
Doctor Bari	2007	Azizur Rahman	Actor		
Tip Tip Brishti	2008	Mohammad Hannan	Actor		
Shapludu	2019	Golam Sohrab Dodul	Actor		
Toofan	2024	Raihan Rafi	Actor		
Malik	2026	Saif Chandan	Actor		

=== Television ===
Title	Year	Credited as		Notes	Ref.
Title	Year	Director	Role	Notes	Ref.
Dinratrir Khela	1980		Actor	Television film	
Shongkito Podojatra	1992	Kha Ma Harun	Actor	Telenovela	
Koutob	1996	Yes		Television film	
Gahargachi	1997	Yes		Television film	
Dichakrojaan	1997	Yes		Television film	
Ekjon Aynal Lashkar	1999	Yes		Television film	
Adhuli	2002	Yes		Television film	
Gor	2002	Yes		Television film	
Ronger Manush	2004	Yes	Actor	Telenovela	
Basto Doctor	2004	Yes	Actor	Telenovela	
Kachher Manush	2005–2006		Actor	Telenovela	
Bagikor	2006	Yes		Television film	
Bahadur Doctor	2006			Television film	
Ghor	2006	Yes		Television film	
Sinduknama	2006	Yes		Television film	
Vober Hat	2007	Yes	Actor	Telenovela	
Swapner Bilat	2007	Yes		Telenovela	
Goru Chor	2007	Yes		Television film	
Mouchakey Dhil	2007		Actor	Telenovela	
Etimkhana	2007	Yes		Television film	
Potro Mitali	2007	Yes		Television film	
Ghor Kutum	2008	Yes		Telenovela	
Dholer Baddo	2008	Yes		Television film	
Harkiptey	2008	Yes		Television film	
Sakin Sarisuri	2009	Yes		Telenovela	
Bhalobashar Tin Kaal	2009	Yes		Television film	
Alta Sundori	2009	Yes		Telenovela	
Patri Chai	2009	Yes		Television film	
Gadha Nogor	2009	Yes		Television film	
Warren	2009	Yes		Television film	
Jamai Mela	2010	Yes		Telenovela	
Ochol	2011	Yes		Television film	
Hero	2011	Yes		Television film	
Kota Dilem To	2011	Yes		Television film	
Learned Man	2011	Yes		Telenovela	
Mayti Kotha Bolibe Kintu Prem Koribe Na	2013	Yes		Television film	
Azrail	2014	Yes		Television film	
Nikti	2014	Yes		Television film	
Ronger Manushera Kemon Ache?	2014	Yes		Telenovela	
Layek Chan the Great	2014	Yes		Telenovela	
Mr. Pashan Ekhon Neta Hoite Chaye	2014		Actor	Television film	
Sikandar Box Ekhon Bandarban-e	2014		Actor	Telenovela	
Khorkuto	2015	Yes		Telenovela	
Piyar Alir Piyari	2015	Yes		Telenovela	
Kopale Jodi Haar Thake	2015	Yes		Telenovela	
The Village Engineer	2016	Yes	–	Television film	
Mister Pashan Is Back	2016		Actor	Television film	
Disturb	2016			Television film	
Love Mane Bhalobasha	2016	Yes		Television film	
What Is Your Father's Name?	2016	Yes		Television film	
Iti Mirzafar	2016	Yes		Television film	
Koyna	2016	Yes		Television film	
Bou Tumi Kar	2016	Yes	–	Telenovela	
Sonar Pakhi Rupar Pakhi	2017	Yes		Telenovela	
Priyo Din Priyo Raat	2018	Yes		Telenovela	
O Pakhi Tor Jontrona	2021	Yes	Actor	Telenovela	
Shanti Molom 10 Taka	2022		Actor	Telenovela	
Shonda Panda	2023	Yes		Telenovela	

=== Web series ===
Title	Year	OTT	Credited as		Notes	Ref.
Title	Year	OTT	Director	Role	Notes	Ref.
Boli	2021	Hoichoi	No	Mojid		
Black Money	2025	BongoBD	No	MP		
Cactus	2026	Chorki	No			

== Judge ==
- Prominent playwright and actor Salahuddin Lavlu has acted as a judge in a multi-talent hunt reality show called 'Ananya Protiva' on NTV.

== Awards and recognition ==
=== Best director ===
- 2005 Lux-Channel i Performance Awards Best Director for Molla Barir Bou
