= Saidul Anam Tutul =

Bangladeshi drama and film director (died 2018)

- সাইদুল আনাম টুটুল
- Died: 18 December 2018 (aged 68); Dhaka, Bangladesh
- Occupations: Drama and film director, editor
- Years active: 1979–2018
- Notable work: Surja Dighal Bari; Adhiar
- Awards: National Film Award

Saidul Anam Tutul (died on 18 December 2018) was a Bangladeshi drama and film director. He started his career as a film editor. He won Bangladesh National Film Award for Best Editing for the film Surja Dighal Bari (1979).

== Filmography ==
=== Director ===
- Adhiar (2003)

=== Editor ===
- Surja Dighal Bari (1979)
- Ghuddi (1980)
- Dahan (1986)
- Dipu Number Two (1996)
- Dukhai (1997)
- Adhiar (2003)

== Television ==
=== Drama ===
- Shongkito Podojatra (1992)
- Nal Piran (1998)
- Bokhate (2009)
- Apon Por (2009)
- Nishikabya (2009)
- Helicopter (2011)
- 52 Golir Ek goli
- Daymar Sontanera
- Aparajita
- Shiulimala
- Koote Kahar (2012)
- Mriter Prottaborton (2012)
- Gobra Chor (2014)

=== TV programs ===
- Royel Tiger Nattojuddyo - as a judge.

== Awards ==
- Bangladesh National Film Award for Best Editing (1979)
- Fazlul Haque Memorial Award as film director in 2004.

== Personal life and death ==
Tutul was married to Mobashwera Khanam. Together they had two daughters, Oishi and Amrita. Tutul died at LAB Aid Hospital in Dhaka on 18 December 2018 after a heart attack.
