= Chorabali (2012 film) =

- Directed by: Redoan Rony
- Written by: Redoan Rony
- Produced by: Salehin Swapan
- Starring: Indraneil Sengupta; Joya Ahsan; Shahiduzzaman Selim; A.T.M. Shamsuzzaman; Sohel Rana; Jannatul Ferdoush Peya
- Cinematography: Khair Khandakar
- Edited by: Khaled Mahmud Rajon
- Music by: Indraadip Dasgupta
- Production company: Screen House Entertainment
- Release date: 21 December 2012
- Running time: 137 minutes
- Country: Bangladesh
- Language: Bengali

Chorabali (Bengali: চোরাবালি, English: Quicksand) is a 2012 Bangladeshi action thriller film written and directed by Redoan Rony. It stars Indraneil Sengupta, Joya Ahsan, Shahiduzzaman Selim and many more. It was Rony's debut film. It was released on 21 December 2012.

== Cast ==
- Indraneil Sengupta as Sumon
- Joya Ahsan as Noboni Afroz
- Shahiduzzaman Selim as Ali Osman (Mafia Don)
- A.T.M. Shamsuzzaman as Chief Politician
- Sohel Rana as Hayder Khan
- Jannatul Ferdoush Peya as Suzana
- Iresh Zaker as Swapan
- Shamima Nazneen as Sumon's mother

== Accolades ==
At the 37th Bangladesh National Film Awards, Chorabali won in five categories. Joya Ahsan won her second National Film Award for Best Actress in a row. ATM Shamsuzzaman won Best Supporting Actor. Shahiduzzaman Selim received his first National Award, Best Performance in a Negative Role. Rony won Best Dialogue, and Ripon Nath won Best Sound Recording. At the 41st Bachsas Awards, Chorabali won in two categories. Peya won Best Supporting Actress, and Rony won Best Story.
