= Pita (2012 film) =

- Pita theatrical poster
- Directed by: Masud Akhond
- Written by: Masud Akhond
- Produced by: Impress Telefilm Limited
- Starring: Masud Akhond; Jayanta Chattopadhyay; Shamima Nazneen; Bonna Mirza; Shaina Amin
- Cinematography: Masud Akhond
- Music by: Sayan Wahid; Emon Saha
- Production company: Impress Telefilm Limited
- Distributed by: Impress Telefilm Limited
- Release date: 28 December 2012
- Country: Bangladesh
- Language: Bengali Urdu

Pita (Bengali: পিতা; lit. 'Father') is a 2012 Bangladeshi film written and directed by Masud Akhond. It stars Masud Akhond, Jayanta Chattopadhyay, Shamima Nazneen, Shaina Amin, Bonna Mirza, Sumon Kalyan and many more. It was released on 28 December 2012 in Bangladesh. It also premiered on 5 May 2013 at the Wilshire theater of Beverly Hills, LA.

== Plot summary ==
Nitai, the head of the Hindu community in the village, called a meeting on the news that the Pakistani military could come to the village at any time. Jalil, the only Muslim blacksmith in the village, came out of the house saying this to his sheltering father Bishu. The meeting is also being held at the house of Mr. Jamadar. He does not want Pakistan to be different. Bipin is a bit worried and he wants to leave the country quickly. But his son Sharat does not agree. He wants to fight for the country. Additionally, his wife is introverted. You can't go anywhere far with him. Sharmili is Nitai's daughter. Widowed a few days ago. He loves Jalil's daughter and is very fond of Jalil's family.

One day a wild boar entered the village. Everyone is shouting about him. At night, when the possibility of delivery of autumn wife Pallavi arose, she brought the midwife Kamala Masi. At that time the Pak military also attacked the village. Sharat escapes with his father and pregnant wife. But when he went to fetch the midwife's bag, he was caught. Her father rushed to her rescue and the Pakistani army killed both of them. Many more like them died in their hands. Although Jalil survived with his sons, the military captured his daughter, Sharmili, and a few other girls. Jalil tries hard to save the girl.

== Cast ==
- Masud Akhond as Jalil - A courageous father who tried his best to save his children.
- Jayanta Chattopadhyay as Bipin
- Shamima Nazneen
- Kalyan Corraya
- Shaina Amin
- Bonna Mirza
- Bakhtiar Zaman Bhuiyan

== Music ==
Pita - The Father

Soundtrack album by Sayan Wahid and Emon Saha
- Released: 2012 (Bangladesh)
- Recorded: 2010
- Genre: Films Sound Track
- Label: Impress Telefilm Limited
- Producer: Impress Telefilm Limited

The music of this film was directed by Sayan Wahid and Emon Saha and lyrics were penned by Rabindranath Tagore, Bishu Shikder, Sayan Wahid and Masud Akhand.

Track	Singer(s)	Lyrics	Music
Tor Bhitore Ami Thaki	Meher Afroz Shaon	Masud Akhand	Emon Saha

== Awards ==
National Film Awards - 2012

- Best Music Director - Emon Saha
