= Masum Reza =

Bangladeshi writer and director

- মাসুম রেজা
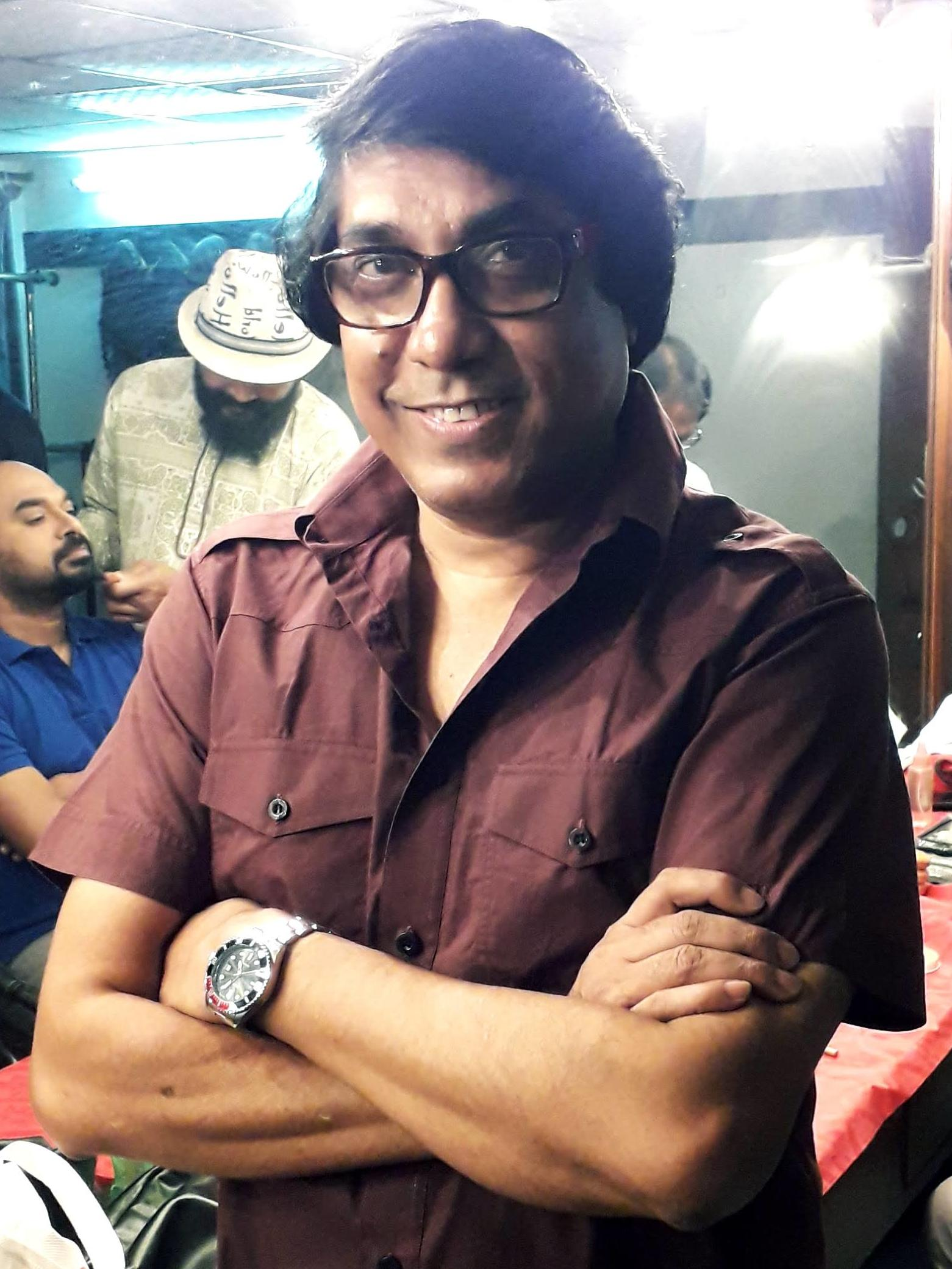
- Reza in October 2018
- Born: Kushtia, Khulna
- Education: Rajshahi University
- Occupation: Playwright
- Spouse: Selina Shelley

Masum Reza is a Bangladeshi playwright, television drama and stage play director. He is best known for writing the screenplay of the television drama serial Ronger Manush (2004). In 2016, he won Bangla Academy Literary Award in the drama category. He wrote screenplay for films including Meghla Akash (2002), Molla Barir Bou (2005), Bapjaner Bioscope (2015) and Hason Raja (2017). In 2010, he published two novels.

== Career ==
Reza debuted in direction in Chand Alir Documentary, a street play, in Kushtia in 1979. He has been associated with the theater troupe Desh Natok since 1988. His full-fledged stage play is Birsa Kabya. He first wrote the screenplay for the television drama Koitab.

== Works ==
Stage plays

- Surgaon (2017)
- Kuhokjal (2014)
- NityaPurana (2001)

Television dramas

- Ronger Manush (2004)
- Megh Rang Meye (2005)
- Saat Sawdagor (2013)
- The Village Engineer (2016)

Films

- Meghla Akash (2002)
- Molla Barir Bou (2005)
- Bapjaner Bioscope (2015)
- Hason Raja (2017)

Novels

- Meen Konna-do (2010)
- Goalkeeper (2010)

== Awards ==
- Bachsas Award (2003)
- Zakaria Smrity Padak (2004)
- Meril Prothom Alo Awards for Best Playwright (2006)
- Bangla Academy Literary Award (2016)
- National Film Awards (Bangladesh) (2017)
