= 32nd Bachsas Awards =

Bangladeshi film awards ceremony in 2013

- Awarded for: outstanding performers of the silver screen, small screen, music, dance and theatre in 2010
- Awarded by: Bangladesh Cine-Journalists' Association
- Presented by: Bangladesh Cine-Journalists' Association
- Announced on: September 8, 2013
- Presented on: October 10, 2013
- Site: Indoor Stadium, Mirpur, Dhaka, Bangladesh

Highlights
- Best Film: Gohine Shobdo
- Best Actor: Shakib Khan (Bhalobaslei Ghor Bandha Jay Na)
- Best Actress: Moushumi (Golapi Ekhon Bilatey)

The 32nd Bachsas Awards were given by the Bangladesh Cholochitra Sangbadik Samity (Bangladesh Cine-Journalists' Association) to outstanding performers of the silver screen, small screen, music, dance, and theatre in 2010. The awards were introduced in 1972 to encourage the fledgling film industry of the country.

== List of winners ==
=== Film ===
| Name of Awards | Winner(s) | Film |
|---|---|---|
| Best Film | Faridur Reza Sagar (Impress Telefilm Limited) | Gohine Shobdo |
| Best Director | Khalid Mahmud Mithu | Gohine Shobdo |
| Best Actor | Shakib Khan | Bhalobaslei Ghor Bandha Jay Na |
| Best Actress | Moushumi | Golapi Ekhon Bilatey |
| Best Supporting Actor | Masum Aziz | Gohine Shobdo |
| Best Supporting Actress | Shiropa Purna | Gohine Shobdo |
| Best Music Director | Alauddin Ali | Golapi Ekhon Bilatey |
| Best Lyrics | Amjad Hossain | Golapi Ekhon Bilatey (Keno Loke Bhalobasa Chay) |
| Best Male Playback Singer | Andrew Kishore | Golapi Ekhon Bilatey (Keno Loke Bhalobasa Chay) |
| Best Female Playback Singer | Rezwana Choudhury Bannya | Gohine Shobdo (Tumi Amar Jiboner Gohine Aso) |
| Best Story | Khalid Mahmud Mithu and Faridur Reza Sagar | Gohine Shobdo |
| Best Dialogue | Jakir Hossain Razu | Bhalobaslei Ghor Bandha Jay Na |
| Best Cinematography | Jakir Hossain Razu | Bhalobaslei Ghor Bandha Jay Na |
| Best Screenplay | Hasan Ahmed | Gohine Shobdo |
| Best Art Direction | Mohiuddin Faruque; Kanak Chapa Chakma | Moner Manush; Gohine Shobdo |
| Best Editing | Touhid Hossain Chowdhury | Bhalobaslei Ghor Bandha Jay Na |
| Best Sound Recording | Rezaul Karim Badal | Bhalobaslei Ghor Bandha Jay Na |
