= List of Bangladeshi films of 2006 =

The following Bangladeshi films were released in 2006.

== Releases ==
Opening	Title	Director	Cast	Genre	Notes	Ref.
7 April	Na Bolo Na	Didarul Alam Badal	Riaz, Shimla, Sumona Soma, Bobita	Romance		
5 May	Koti Takar Kabin	FI Manik	Shakib Khan, Apu Biswas, Razzak, Suchorita, Faruq, Dipjol	Romance, drama		
9 June	Rani Kuthir Baki Itihash	Samia Zaman	Popy, Ferdous Ahmed, Alamgir, Tariq Anam Khan, Rahmat Ali	Drama, romance		
30 June	Jobab De	Abul Khair Bulbul	Rubel, Jona, Mitu, Omar Sani	Action		
30 June	Nacholer Rani	Syed Wahiduzzaman Diamond	Shahana Shumi	Drama		
14 July	Bangla (2006 film)	Shahidul Islam Khokon	Mahfuz Ahmed, Shabnur, Humayun Faridi	Drama	Ongkar by Ahmed Sofa	
28 July	Forever Flows	Abu Sayeed	Shabnur, Ilias Kanchan, Litu Anam, Dolly Zahur, Jayanta Chattopadhyay, Shahidul Islam Shacchu	Drama	Based on Humayun Ahmed's novel Jonom Jonom	
28 July	Pitar Ason	FI Manik	Shakib Khan, Nipun Akter	Drama		
4 August	Kabuliwala	Kazi Hayat	Manna, Dighi, Subrata Barua	Drama	Based on Rabindranath Tagore's short story	
18 August	Hridoyer Kotha	S.A. Haque Alik	Riaz, Purnima, Moushumi, Dolly Zahur	Romance, drama		
25 August	Chacchu	FI Manik	Shakib Khan, Apu Biswas, Dipjol, Dighi, Aliraz, Sharmili Ahmed	Drama		
25 October	Rupkothar Golpo - A Fairy Tale	Tauquir Ahmed	Chanchal Chowdhury, Taskin Sumi, Tauquir Ahmed, Humayun Faridi	Drama		
24 November	Dadi Ma	FI Manik	Shakib Khan, Apu Biswas, Anwara, Dipjol, Dighi, Aliraz, Omar Sani	Drama		
	Ghani - The Cycle	Kazi Morshed	Raisul Ahmed Asad, Dolly Zahur, Masum Aziz, Naznin Chumki, Parvez Murad, Rani Sarker, Anwar Hossain			
	Duratto - The Alienation	Morshedul Islam	Raisul Islam Asad, Suborna Mustafa, Humayun Faridi, Hakim Ferdous	Family, drama	Children's film	
	Nondito Noroke - In Blissful Hell	Belal Ahmed	Ferdous Ahmed, Monir Khan Shimul, Sumona Soma, Litu Anam	Drama	Based on Humayun Ahmed's novel of the same title	
	Shuva	Chashi Nazrul Islam	Shakib Khan, Purnima, Sujata, Chashi Nazrul Islam, Tushar Khan	Drama	Based on Rabindranath Tagore's novel	
	Khelaghor - Doll House	Morshedul Islam	Riaz, Sohana Saba	Romance, war	Based on Bangladesh Liberation War	
	Bidrohi Padma - The Rebel Rivers	Badol Khondokar	Riaz, Popy, Ilias Kanchan, Champa	Drama	Based on Askar Ibn Shaikh's novel	
	Roser Baidani	PA Kajal	Shakib Khan, Shabnur			
	Mayer Morjada	Dilip Biswas	Manna, Moushumi, Shakib Khan, Shabnur	Drama		
	Bokul Phuler Mala	Delwar Jahan Jhantu	Riaz, Tanjika, Wasim, Anwar Hossain	Romance		
	Maleka Sundori	Nur Hossain Moni	Riaz, Neha	Romance		
	Dui Noyoner Alo	Mostafizur Rahman Manik	Ferdous Ahmed, Shabnur, Shakil Khan, Riaz	Romance		
	Mad_e in Bangladesh	Mostofa Sarwar Farooki	Zahid Hasan, Shahiduzzaman Selim, Tariq Anam Khan, Rosy Siddqui, Hasan Masood, Marjuk Russel, Fazlur Rahman Babu, Shahidul Alam Shacchu, Srabosti Tinni	Comedy, drama		

== See also ==
- List of Bangladeshi films of 2007
- List of Bangladeshi films
- Dhallywood
- Cinema of Bangladesh
