= Jeetu Ahsan =

Bangladeshi actor

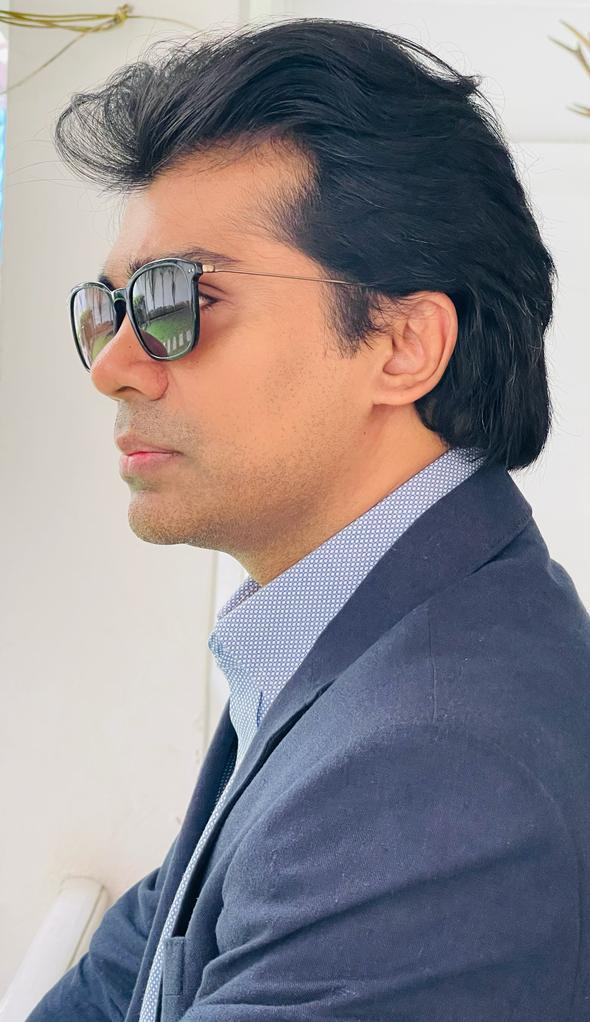
- Ahsan in 2022
- Born: Syed Ashek Ali; 12 September 1981 (age 45); Dhaka
- Education: St. Joseph Higher Secondary School; Notre Dame College, Dhaka; North South University
- Occupation: Actor
- Years active: 1982 – present
- Spouse: Taskina Ali
- Children: 2
- Awards: RTV Star
- Website: www.jeetuahsan.com

Signature
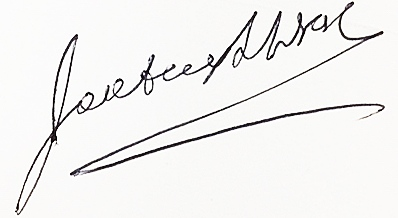

Jeetu Ahsan or Jitu Ahsan (born Syed Ashek Ali on 12 September 1981) is a Bangladeshi actor. The son of actor Syed Ahsan Ali, popularly known as Sydney, and educator Suraiya Ahsan, Ahsan made his acting debut as a child artist in Mustafizur Rahman's 'Ekti Shetur Golpo' (1982) in Bangladesh Television. As an adult, Ahsan professionally entered the acting arena with Abdullah Al Mamun's soap opera "Joar Bhata" in the year 2000. "Joar Bhata" was the first soap opera in the country in which Ahsan portrayed an anti-hero character and was immediately recognised as an upcoming talent. Throughout his career, Ahsan has ventured many anti-hero characters and received much applause. Esteemed Actor Humayun Faridee termed Ahsan as the best and the most talented of the contemporary actors. He received the RTV Star Award in 2014 as best actor. He acted in a pivotal character of the highly acclaimed seven national award winner movie “Gohin Baluchor” in 2016. Among his notable works are “Shaola”, “Andhokarer Biruddhe”, “Jowar Bhata”, “Tobuo Protikkha”, “Nouka Dubi”, “Gohiney”, “Elebele”. He is also a member of "Aranyak Nattadal" in theater.

== Early life and education ==
Jeetu Ahsan was born on 12 September 1981 in Dhaka to legendary actor of Bengali drama and film, Syed Ahsan Ali and educator Suraiya Ahsan. Jeetu Ahsan's father Syed Ahsan Ali, popularly known as Sidney, was the first national award winning actor in Bangladesh Television (BTV). Ahsan's paternal grandfather was Syed Mohammed Ali, a Zamindar and his maternal grandfather was Moulovi Emdad Ali, a District Magistrate during British India.

Ahsan attended Sunbeams school, St. Joseph Higher Secondary School and Notre Dame College in Dhaka. He finished his undergraduate (BBA) and graduate (MBA) program from North South University, Dhaka.

== Career ==
=== Child (1986–1994) ===
Jeetu Ahsan entered the world of acting in 1986 as a child artist following the footsteps of his father, Syed Ahsan Ali Sydney. His first drama was ‘Ekti Shetur Golpo’ broadcast on Bangladesh Television in 1982. From 1982 to 1994, Ahsan acted in 10 single episode dramas, one serial drama in Bangladesh Television (BTV) and one film titled Laal Balloon.

=== Professional expansion (2000–present) ===
Ahsan got his professional breakthrough in Abdullah Al Mamun's first soap opera in the country “Joar Bhata” in the year 2000 sharing screen with big names such as Abdullah Al Mamun, Ferdousi Majumdar, Tareen, Shahiduzzaman Selim etc. Ahsan played an anti-hero character in Joar Bhata. Ahsan's performance was widely appreciated and he started getting offers from big name production houses and directors such as Humayun Faridee, Afzal Hossain, Badrul Anam Saud, Suborna Mustafa, Nahid Ahmed Piyal, Mohon Khan, Akhter Ferdous Rana to name a few.

After his professional inception in the year 2000, Ahsan was extensively involved in soap operas, mega serials, telefilms and single episode dramas and has worked in all television channels. Romantic, villainous, social, double roles, urban, rural Ahsan has ventured in multifaceted characters. His acting skills gained him much appreciation, the media tagging him as a ‘Versatile’ actor. During his mother's ailment in 2018 and death in 2019, Ahsan worked in very few plays.

=== Film ===
Ahsan made his debut on the silver screen with the film “Gohin Baluchor” directed by Badrul Anam Soud. Ahsan played the crucial antagonist role in the movie. The movie was highly acclaimed and went on to win seven national awards. Apart from Bangladesh, the movie was also released in USA and Canada. The film was highly appreciated among the Bengali communities abroad. Apart from ‘Gohin Baluchor’, Ahsan acted as a child artist in a short film titled “Laal Belloon” in 1984.

== Personal life ==
In family life, Ahsan married Taskina Islam in 2003 and together they have two children Syeda Adiba Ali and Syed Abrar Ali.

== Television appearances ==
=== Dramas, telefilms, serials and soap operas ===
Notable Drama List
Year	Title	Director	Co-artist	Broadcast Chanel	Notes
1986	Ekti Shetur Golpo	Mostafizur Rahman	Syed Ahsan Ali (Sidney)	BTV	Drama
1984	Pearl	Mostafizur Rahman	Syed Ahsan Ali (Sidney)	BTV	Drama
1984	Shesh Manusher Thikana	Syed Siddiq Hossain	Syed Ahsan Ali (Sidney)	BTV	Drama
1985	Shat Jon Jatri	Mostafizur Rahman	Syed Ahsan Ali (Sidney)	BTV	Drama
1990	Jonaki Jole	Zia Ansari	Syed Ahsan Ali (Sidney)	BTV	Drama Serial
1993	Upotkuto Chai	Syed Siddiq Hossain	Apu Sarkar	BTV	Drama
1995	Ek Nokkttoter Niche	Syed Siddiq Hossain	Rubina Parvin Runa	BTV	Drama
1996	Khela Bittngar Khela	Syed Ahsan Ali	Tonima Hamid	BTV	Drama
2000	Joar Bhata	Abdullah Al Mamun	Ishita, Tareen	Channel I	Soap Opera
2001	Shokhi Tumi Kaar	Abdullah Al Mamun	Ishita	BTV	Drama
2001	Tahar Namti Ronjona	Suborna Mustafa	Linsa	Boishaki TV	Drama
2001	Amor Priyo Bandhobi	BulBul Zilani	Tavner Sweety	NTV	Telefilm
	Attoprakash	Arun Chowdhury	Jaya Ahsan	ETV	Serial
2002	Shomudro Shimnay	Mohan Khan	Tareen, Jaya Ahsan	BTV	Drama Serial
2002	Home Video	Akhter, Ferdous, Rana	Isitta, Jahid Hasan	ETV	Drama
2002	Shobuj Gram Shamol Chaya	Fazlur Rahman	Sumaiya Shimu	BTV	Serial
2003	Baba	Abdullah Al mamun	Ishita, Tareen, Abullah Al Mamun	ATN	Soap Opera
2003	Shokhi Tumi Kar	Abdullah Al Mamun	Abdullah Al mamun, Ferdousi Majumdar	BTV	Drama
2003	Shompurno Rongin Natok	Mohon Khan	Nadia Ahmed, Mahfuz Ahmed	BTV	Serial
2003	Tobuo Protikkha	Humayun Faridee	Suborna Mustafa, Humayun Faridee, Purnima	NTV	Telefilm
2004	Chondrogrostha	Humayun Faridee	Sumaiya Shimu, Humayun Faridee	NTV	Telefilm
2004	Kochoripana	Taher, Shipon	Deepa Khondokar	ATN	Drama
2004	Shuborna Rekha Dekhte Giye	Ashraful Alam Ripon	Sumaiya Shimu	NTV	Drama
2004	Phire Ashbar Pothe	Amlan Biswas	Sharmin Shila	Bangla Vision	Drama
2004	Shondehatit	Rawnak Alm	Tamalika Karmakar	Boishkhi	Drama
2004	Shunne Boshobash	Sohel Arman	Srabosti, Tinni	Channel One	Drama
2004	Bon Manush	Nahid Ahmed, Piyal		NTV	Drama
2004	Khesharot	Nashin	Nadia	ATN	Drama
2005	Sheola	Akhter Ferdous Rana	Sumaiya Shimu, Raisul Islam Asad	NTV	Soap Opera
2005	Koto Chena Koto Ochena	Ashraful, Ripon	Mir Sabbir	ATN	Soap Opera
2005	Pigeon Blood Ruby	Nahid Ahmed Piyal	Mim	NTV	Drama
2005	Ontorgoto Rokter Bhitore	Nahid Ahmed Piyal	Kusum Shikdar	NTV	Drama
2005	Apuranta	Shamima Akther Baby	Suborna Mustafa, Rumana	ATN	Drama
2005	Shada Kalo	Aporno Anwar	Mosharrof Karim	ATN	Drama Serial
2005	Jhut Jhamela	Munir Chowdury	Intekhab Dinar Rumana	NTV	Serial
2005	Sporsher Baire	Shahiduzzaman Selim	Sanjida Priti	NTV	Soap Opera
2005	Arshi	Tonmoy, Tansen	Sumaiya Shimu	Channel i	Drama Serial
2005	Alokngor	Saidul Anam Tutul	Moushumi Nag	ATN	Soap Opera
2005	Ek Akasher Tara	Ejaj Munna	Tisha, Joy	Channel I	Soap Opera
2005	Ghun Poka	Tareq Mintu	Deepa Khondokar	ATN Bangla	Soap Opera
2006	Je Jibon Jonakir	Shahin, Shadhin	Monir Khan, Shimul, Ohona	ETV	Telefilm
2006	Probhashok Theke Professor	Nahid Ahmed, Piyal	Aupee Karim	Bangla Vision	Drama
2006	Somukh Akash	Kabir Babu	Suborna Mustafa, Chadni	ATN	Drama
2006	Aj Dinti kemon jabe	Saeed Rinku	Orsha	ATN	Drama
2006	Mon Jekhane	Azizul Hakim	Srabonti, Azizul Hakim	Channel I	Drama
2006	Alo Amar Alo	Abul Hayat	Aupee Karim	BTV	Serial
2006	Durer Tumi	Kaushik Shankar Das	Tisha	Channel One	Telefilm
2006	Fapor	Rajibul Islam Rajib	Nadia Ahmed	ETV	Drama
2006	Ondhokarer Biruddhe	Nahid Ahmed Piyal	Kushum Shikdar, Tahmina Sultana Mou	NTV	Drama
2006	Shudhu Alapon	Nahid Ahmed Piyal	Aupee Karim	NTV	Drama
2006	Badol Barishone	Nahid Ahmed Piyal	Kushum Shikdar	Bangla Vision	Drama
2006	Body Gard	Tonmoy Tansen	Tony Dias, Richi	RTV	Drama
2006	Urchey Achol Dropodir	Mohan Khan	Farzana Ria, Mir Sabbir	ATN	Telefilm
2006	Ekti Shundor Shokal	Humyun Fardee	Mir Sabbir, Sumaiya Shimu	NTV	Telefilm
2006	Rajar Golpo Shesh	Shamima Akthar Baby	Suborna Mustafa	NTV	Telefilm
2006	Cinemar Golpa	Mohan Khan	Tania Ahmed	ATN	Telefilm
2006	Shopna Jatra	Abul Hayat	Natasha, Hayat, Towkir Ahmed	NTV	Serial
2006	Ek Jonme	Abdullah Al Mamun	Tareen	ATN	Soap Opera
2006	Monbari	Syed Shakil	Srabonti	Channel I	Serial
2007	Nirob Kosto	Azizul Hakim	Jaya Ahsan, Bonna Mirza	Channel I	Drama
2007	Manobjomin	Murad Parvez	Apurbo, Sohana Saba	NTV	Soap Opera
2007	Batasher Gran	Mahfuz Ahmed	Tareen, Mahfuz Ahmed	ATN	Telefilm
2007	Esho	Chayanika Chowdhury	Tareen	RTV	Drama
2007	Amor Jochona Dine	Tania Ahmed	Tinni, Suborna, Mustafa	ATN	Telefilm
2007	Attoshon Nighdo Ekjon	Monir Hossain	Farah Ruma	Bangla Vision	Drama
2007	Ebong Otopor	Humayun Faridee	Sumaiya Shimu	NTV	Drama
2007	Ektiraat Kichu Kotha	Kaushik Shankar Das	Tareen	ATN	Drama
2007	Bhalo Basha Mondo Basha	S.H. Hoque, Olik	Sumaiya Shimu	NTV	Serial
2007	Rongial Bao	Sayed Shakil	Sraboni	ATN	Soap Opera
2007	Chera Patar Kabbo	S.A. Hoque Lik	Toukir Ahmed	ATN	Drama
2007	Nouka Dubi	Nahid Ahmed, Piyal	Kusum Shikdar, Aupee Karim	Channel I	Soap Opera
2007	Khuje Pete Chai	Zia Raihan	Saberi Alom	NTV	Drama
2007	Sukh Shabore Door Shatar	Humayun Faridee	Humayun Faridee, Momo	ATN	Drama
2008	Nirbashone	Badrul Anam Soud	Bonna Mirza	RTV	Telefilm
2008	Dolls House	Badrul Anam Soud	Santida, Pritti	ATN	Soap Opera
2008	Ekti Sucidal Note O Koekti Ghotna	Rulion Rahman	Bonna Mirza	Boishakhi TV	Drama
2008	Soshomatpo Upakkhan	Shahin Shadhin	Tarren, Monir Khan, Shimol	Bangla Vision	Drama
2008	Kushum O Kit	Afzal Hossain	Tisha	Channel I	Telefilm
2008	Srikhol	Mohhammad Noman	Badhon	Bangla Vision	Drama
2008	Pothee Jete Jete	Humayun Faridee	Humayan Faridee, Jahid Hasan, Sumiya Shimu	NTV	Telefilm
2009	Shimanto	Badrul, Anam, Soud	Suborna Mustafa	Desh TV	Soap Opera
2009	Tokhon Hemonto	Humyan Fridee	Humayun Faridee Mou	Boishahkhi TV	Soap Opera
2009	Star	Tania Ahmed	Tinni, Mamunur Rashid	ATN Bangla	Drama
2009	Chokh	Humayun Faridee	Humayun Faridee, Mou	RTV	Telefilm
2009	Pocket Shabdhan	Anonno Emon	Prova	RTV	Drama
2009	Bhara Bari Bara Bari	Humayan Faridee	Sumaiya Shimu	ATN	Serial
	Nineteen Twenty	Hridi Haq	Sreyoshi	Ekhushey TV	Soap Opera
2010	Gohine	Badrul Anam Soud	Suborna Mustafa, Sabbir Alam	Desh TV	Soap Opera
2010	Nodiite Ondhokar	Nahid Ahmed Piyal	Richi Solaiman	Desh TV	Serial
2010	Dokkhinyoner Din	Sajjad Shumon	Sumaiya Shimu	NTV	Soap Opera
2010	Atongkito Raat	Shomia Akther Baby	Mimo	Boishkhi TV	Drama
2010	porahoto	Hmauyn Faridee	Humayun Faridee, Sumiya Shim	Boishkhi TV	Telefilm
2011	Jogajog	Nahid Ahmed Piyal	Kushum Shikdar	Channel I	Soap Opera
2011	The circle	Tuhin Obonto	Sumaiya Shimu	NTV	Drama
2011	Eka	Nahid Ahmed, Piyal	Aupee Karim	Channel I	Drama
2011	Paharer chaya Patader Gaan	Abu Raihan jewel	Sumiay Shimu	NTV	Telefilm
2012	Gronthikgon kohe	Badrul Anam Soud	Suborna Mustafa	Channel I	Soap Opera
2012	Jhorer rate	Chaynika Chowdury	Richie Solamian	Bangla Vision	Drama
2012	Ulto Gatha	Mujibul Haque Khokon	Bijori Barkatullah	RTV	Drama
2012	Ragini	Nahid Ahmed Piyal	Aporna	NTV	Drama
2012	Anuradha	Nahid Ahmed Piyal	Brishti	Channel I	Drama
2013	Nishshokgo Pankouri	Nahid Ahmed Piyal	Nadia Ahmed Orsha	BTV	Drama
2013	Bekar Ek Car Theke Je Golper Shuru	Syed Jamim	Suborna Mustafa	Boishakhi TV	Drama
2013	Kiron	Nahid Ahmed Piyal	Kusum Shikdar	Channel I	Drama
2014	Mayar Khela	Rulin Rahman	Richie Solamain	RTV	Soap Opera
2014	Hashemer prottaborton	Saidul Anam Tutul	Chonda	ATN Bangla	Drama
2014	Rodelar Glopa	S.A. Haque Olik	Moushumi	Bangla Vision	Drama
2014	Konok	Nahid Ahmed Piyal	Aporna	NTV	Telefilm
2015	Fele Asha Laal Golap	Nahid Ahmed Piyal	Raishul Islam Asad	Channel I	Drama
2015	Adorsho Karigor	Nahid Ahmed Piyal	Deepa Khonkal	Channel I	Drama
2015	Somukh Akash	Kabir Babu	Suborna, Phijush Chadni, Jeni, Mahima	Boishakhi TV	Drama
2015	Shuknogor Apartment	Arun Chowdhury	Ishita	ATN Bangla	Soap Opera
2016	Omia	Nahid Ahmed Piyal	Mim	Channel I	Drama
2016	The Circle	Tuhin Obonta	Sumaiya Shimu	NTV	Drama
2016	Just Married	Rahmatullah Tuhin	Nadia Ahmed	SATV	Drama
2016	Dak Diya she Jay	Nahid Ahmed Piyal	Mim	Channel I	Drama
2016	Puturajoggo	Nahid Ahmed Piyal	Sharmin Joha Shasi	Desh TV	Drama
2016	Bissas Ebong Otopor	Alvi Ahmed	Purnima	NTV	Telefilm
2016	Anotorjatra	Badrul Anam Soud	Suborna Mustafa, Dilara Zaman	ETV	Soap Opera
2016	Mon tar Shongkhini	Badrul Anam Soud	Mou	RTV	Telefilm
2016	Antorjatra	Badrul Anam Saud	Suborna Mustafa, Dilara Zaman	Ekushey TV	Soap Opera
2017	Manbhonjon	Nahid Ahmed Piyal	Israt Jahn Chatti	Channel I	Drama
2017	Khujepite chai	Zia Raihan	Himi, Saberi Alam	NTV	Drama
2018	Tomar Onna Jager Shokna	Nahid Ahmed Piyal	Mantasha	Channel I	Drama
2018	Juger Porosh Pathor	Chayanika Chowdhury	Suborna Mustafa, Deepa Khandokar	GTV	Drama
2018	Fele Jawa Rumal Khani	Nahid Ahmed Piyal	Tareen	Channel I	Drama
2018	Osomapto Upakkhan	Monir Khan Shimul	Tarin		Drama
2019	Lukochuri Lukochori Glopo	Badrul Anam Soud	Nilanjona Nila	BTV	Soap Opera
2019	Oporichita	Nahid Ahmed Piyal	Sarwat Azad Brishti	Channel I	Drama
2020	Joutho Projojona	Maznun Mijan	Dipa Khandakar, Susoma	Chanel I	Telefilm
2020	Tomarei Jeno Valobashiyachi	Nahid Ahmed Piyal	Toya	Channel I Tv	Telefilm
2021	Ekhane Keu Thake Na	Animesh Aich	Bhabna, Shahiduzzaman selim	BTV	Opera
2021	Bokuler Ayna	Jewel Sharif	Nadia Ahmed	BTV	Telefilm

=== Filmography ===
Notable Film
Year	Title	Director	Co-artist	Notes
1985	Lal Balloon	Abdul Latif Bachchu	Joy, Jhilam, Ridwan, Apu, Tapu, Black Anwar and Syed Ahsan Ali Sydney	
2017	Gohin Baluchor	Badrul Anam Saud	Abu Hurayra Tanvir, Jannatun Noor Moon, Neelanjona Neela	
2024	Shoroter Joba	Kusum Sikder	Yash Rohan, Kusum Sikder	

== Awards and achievements ==
For his role in the drama serial ‘Mayar Khela’ (2014), Ahsan won the RTV Star Award for Best Actor.

Year	Award	Drama Name	Category	Result	Note
2014	RTV Star Award”	‘Mayar Khela’	Best Actor	Won	
