= 34th Bangladesh National Film Awards =

National Film Awards, Bangladesh

- Awarded for: Best of bangladeshi cinema in 2009
- Awarded by: President of Bangladesh
- Presented by: Ministry of Information
- Announced on: 21 July 2011
- Presented on: 23 July 2011
- Site: Dhaka, Bangladesh
- Hosted by: Riaz and Shomi Kaiser
- Official website: moi.gov.bd

Highlights
- Best Film: Monpura
- Best Actor: Ferdous Ahmed and Chanchal Chowdhury; Gangajatra and Monpura
- Best Actress: Sadika Parvin Popy; Gangajatra
- Lifetime achievement: Sultana Zaman
- Most awards: Gangajatra (8)

Television coverage
- Channel: BTV

The 34th National Film Awards, presented by Ministry of Information, Bangladesh to felicitate the best of Bangladeshi Cinema released in the year 2009. The government announced the names of 28 artistes in 26 categories for the National Film Award in recognition of their outstanding contributions to the country's film industry. Prime Minister Sheikh Hasina gave away the awards to the artistes. From this year, Government decided to give lifetime achievement award and Sultana Zaman was the first recipient of the award.

== List of winners ==
A Total of 28 awards in 26 categories were given in this year.

=== Merit awards ===
Name of Awards	Winner(s)	Film
Best Film	Anjan Chowdhury	Monpura
Best Director	Syed Wahiduzzaman Diamond	Gangajatra
Best Actor	Ferdous Ahmed; Chanchal Chowdhury	Gangajatra; Monpura
Best Actress	Sadika Parvin Popy	Gangajatra
Best Actor in a Supporting Role	Shahidul Alam Sachchu	Britter Baire
Best Actress in a Supporting Role	Nipun Akter	Chader Moto Bou
Best Actor in a Negative Role	Mamunur Rashid	Monpura
Best Actor in a Comic Role	A.T.M. Shamsuzzaman	Mon Bose Na Porar Table-e
Best Child Artist	Syeda Sabrina	Gangajatra
Best Music Director	Alam Khan	Ebadot
Best Music Composer	Kumar Biswajit	Swami-Strir Wada
Best Lyrics	Kabir Bakul	Ekta Chad Chara Raat (Swami-Strir Wada)
Best Male Playback Singer	Kumar Biswajit	Ekta Chad Chara Raat (Swami-Strir Wada)
Best Female Playback Singer	Krishnokoli and Chondona Majumder	Sonaro Palonker Ghore (Monpura)

=== Merit Awards ===
Name of Awards	Winner(s)	Film
Best Story	Syed Wahiduzzaman Diamond	Gangajatra
Best Dialogue	Mujtoba Soud	Chader Moto Bou
Best Screenplay	Giasuddin Selim	Monpura
Best Cinematography	Mahfuzur Rahman Khan	Britter Baire
Best Art Director	Mohammad Kalantor	Gangajatra
Best Editing	Junayed Halim	Britter Baire
Best Sound Recording	Sujan Mahmud	Britter Baire
Best Costume Design	Dilip Singh	Gangajatra
Best Makeup	Khalilur Rahman	Gangajatra

=== Special awards ===
Name of Awards	Winner(s)	Film
Lifetime Achievement Award	Sultana Zaman	
Best Child Artist (Special)	Zarkan	Priyotomeshu

== Event ==
The whole ceremony was divided into three segment. First, speech of the guests, second award giving and third, cultural program. First two segment were anchored by Dewan Saidur and Shamim Khan. Cultural segment was anchored by Riaz and Shomi Kaiser. In this segment, folk singer Momtaz, Kumar Biswajit, Shakila Zafar and Ankhi Alamgir sang songs for the audience. Shakib Khan-Apu Biswas, Ferdous Ahmed-Moushumi, Mamnun Hasan Emon-Shaina Amin, and Nirob-Sharika performed in the Dhallywood soundtrack. A.T.M. Shamsuzzaman performed in a single act drama. Artists of Bangladesh Shilpakola Academy had two dance performance that night.

== See also ==
- Bachsas Film Awards
- Meril Prothom Alo Awards
- Ifad Film Club Award
- Babisas Award
