= Shyama Kabya =

2024 Bangladeshi film

- Poster
- Directed by: Badrul Anam Saud
- Written by: Badrul Anam Saud
- Screenplay by: Badrul Anam Saud
- Story by: Badrul Anam Saud
- Produced by: Suborna Mustafa; Badrul Anam Saud
- Starring: Shohel Mondal; Neelanjona Neela; Intekhab Dinar; Shahadat Hossain; Shaju Khadem; Nowrin Hasan Khan Jenny
- Cinematography: Ishtiaque Hossain
- Edited by: Badrul Anam Saud
- Music by: Emon Saha
- Production companies: Heritage Films and Communications
- Release date: 3 May 2024
- Country: Bangladesh
- Language: Bengali

Shyama Kabya is a 2024 Bengali language Bangladeshi psychological thriller film. Its story, dialogues, screenplay writing, editing and directing were done by Badrul Anam Saud. Shohel Mondal and Neelanjona Neela played the lead roles. It was produced by Suborna Mustafa and Badrul Anam Saud under the banner Heritage Films and Communications and the music was composed by Emon Saha. It was the debut film of television actress Nowrin Hasan Khan Jenny. The film, funded by the government for the fiscal year 2019-2020, released in theaters in Bangladesh on May 3, 2024.

== Cast ==
- Shohel Mondal - Azad
- Neelajana Neela - Shyama
- Intekhab Dinar - Osman
- Nowrin Hasan Khan Jenny - Neetu
- Shahadat Hossain - Jamindar
- Saju Khadem - Nazim
- Rimi Karim
- AK Azad Shetu - Laxman
- Subhasish Bhowmik - Kodom
- Tanveer Hossain Probal

== Production ==
Filming was done in phases in various locations of Keraniganj, Manikganj, Tangail and Sundarbans.

== Release ==
The film was scheduled to release in Bangladesh theaters on November 24, 2023, but was later pushed back to May 3, 2024.

== Awards ==
The Bangladeshi film won the Special Jury Award, Best Original Screenplay, Best Film and Best Editing in four categories at the Festival Gange sur Seine in Paris.
