= 31st Bachsas Awards =

Bangladeshi film awards ceremony in 2013

- Awarded for: outstanding performers of the silver screen, small screen, music, dance and theatre in 2012
- Awarded by: Bangladesh Cine-Journalists' Association
- Presented by: Bangladesh Cine-Journalists' Association
- Announced on: September 8, 2013
- Presented on: October 10, 2013
- Site: Indoor Stadium, Mirpur, Dhaka, Bangladesh

Highlights
- Best Film: Priyotomeshu
- Best Actor: Ferdous Ahmed (Gangajatra); Chanchal Chowdhury (Monpura)
- Best Actress: Popy (Gangajatra)

The 31st Bachsas Awards were given by the Bangladesh Cholochitra Sangbadik Samity (Bangladesh Cine-Journalists' Association) to outstanding performers of the silver screen, small screen, music, dance, and theatre in 2012. The awards were introduced in 1972 to encourage the fledgling film industry of the country.

== List of winners ==
=== Lifetime Achievement Awards ===
- Nayok Raj Razzak
- Sarah Begum Kobori
- Chashi Nazrul Islam

=== Film ===
Name of Awards	Winner(s)	Film
Best Film		Priyotomeshu
Best Director	Morshedul Islam	Priyotomeshu
Best Actor	Ferdous Ahmed; Chanchal Chowdhury	Gangajatra; Monpura
Best Actress	Popy	Gangajatra
Best Supporting Actor	Shahidul Islam Sachchu	Gangajatra
Best Supporting Actress	Shimla	Gangajatra
Best Music Director	Emon Saha	Gangajatra
Best Lyrics	Sahabuddin Majumder	Opare Akash (Mago Tomar Moto)
Best Male Playback Singer	Fazlur Rahman Babu	Monpura (Nithua Pathare)
Best Female Playback Singer	Kanak Chapa	Gangajatra (Jeona Jeona Shyam)
Best Story	Humayun Ahmed	Priyotomeshu
Best Dialogue	Morshedul Islam	Priyotomeshu
Best Cinematography	Borkot Ullah Maruf	Priyotomeshu
Best Art Direction	Mohammad Kalantor	Gangajatra
Best Editing	Abdullah Tuhin and Shawkat Khandakar	Priyotomeshu
Best Sound Recording	Roton Pal	Priyotomeshu
