= Ratan Talukder =

Bangladeshi Actor, Martial artist

- Born: Ratan Talukder; 28 January 1957 (age 69); Yangon, Myanmar
- Other name: Mong
- Occupations: Actor, Karate instructor
- Years active: 1988–present
- Notable work: Bir Purush, Bojro Mushti and Lampot
- Style: martial art, action
- Height: 5 ft 11 in (180 cm)
- Spouse: Shilpi Talukder
- Children: 3

Ratan Talukder (born 28 January 1957) is a Bangladeshi film actor, fighting director and karate instructor. He usually played supporting negative roles. He debuted as a film actor in the 1986 film Laraku directed by Shahidul Islam Khokon.

== Early life ==
Ratan Talukder was born in Myanmar in 1957. His father, Adhir Ranjan Talukder, was a medical doctor who worked for the British Army in Myanmar. In 1965, the family relocated to Chittagong, Bangladesh. Ratan Talukder developed an interest in martial arts during the 1970s and was a fan of martial arts films.

== Career ==
The first film he acted in was Bir Purush (1988). He made his name in Bojro Mushti (1989) and acted in about 15 films. He also worked as a Fight Director in some films. He often worked with Masum Parvez Rubel, Humayun Faridi and Ilias Kobra. Most of his films were directed by Shahidul Islam Khokon.

== Filmography ==
Year	Title	Director	Role
1986	Laraku	Shahidul Islam Khokon	
1988	Bir Purush	Shahidul Islam Khokon	
1989	Bojromusti	Shahidul Islam Khokon	Mong
1990	Biplob	Shahidul Islam Khokon	
1991	Bishdat	Shahidul Islam Khokon	
1991	Santrash	Shahidul Islam Khokon	
1992	Choker Pani	Masud Parvez	
1996	Rakkhosh	Shahidul Islam Khokon	
1996	Lompot	Shahidul Islam Khokon	Ilias
2006	Khude Joddha	A Q Khokon	

== Karate instructor ==
Takulder is one of the leading karate instructors in the continent. He obtained 7 dan from WUKF and 4 dan from Japan Karate Association. He is the founder and chief coach of Honke Shotokan Karate-Do Association Bangladesh. Talukder has also obtained a licence of International Karate Referee from Asian Karate Federation Gi Asian Judge. He is vice-chairman of the Bangladesh Karate Referee Association.

== Personal life ==
Talukder resides in Chittagong. He is married to Shilpi and has 3 children together.
