= Dhaka City College =

Private college with affiliated high school in Dhanmondi, Dhaka, Bangladesh

- Crest of Dhaka City College
- Other name: City College
- Former name: Dhaka Night College
- Motto: build the Nation
- Type: Private
- Established: 1957
- Parent institution: National University (Bangladesh)
- Academic affiliations: Board of Intermediate and Secondary Education, Dhaka
- Chairman: ব্যারিস্টার নাসির উদ্দিন অসীম
- Principal: Professor Kazi Neamul Haq
- Academic staff: 200
- Students: 8200(Higher Secondary)(approx.)
- Location: House #29(old), 88(New), Road #2, Dhanmondi, Dhanmondi, Dhaka, 1205, Bangladesh; 23.7399°N 90.3827°E
- Campus: Urban
- Language: English, Bengali
- Education system: Both —; Gender-isolated education; Co-education
- Colours: Black and White
- Website: www.dhakacitycollege.edu.bd

Dhaka City College (Bengali: ঢাকা সিটি কলেজ) also known as DCC, is one of the oldest private colleges in Bangladesh. It is located at Road Number 2, Dhanmondi, Dhaka. It offers Honors and Masters degree programs as well as higher secondary education (HSC). The college is affiliated with the National University of Bangladesh.

== History ==
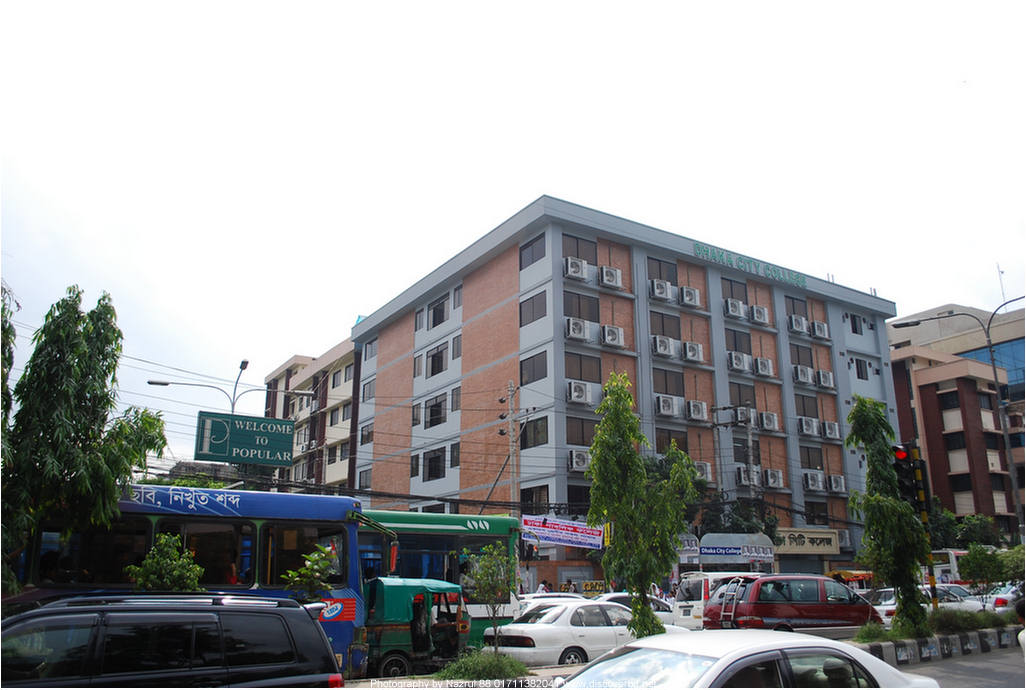
Front view of Dhaka City College.

The college was established in 1957, during the Pakistani ruling period, with the patronage of local educators and social workers. Classes were held at the West End High School and afterwards at Dhaka College. In 1970, college activities were moved to their own premises in Road 2 of the Dhanmondi residential area. Prior to this, it was known as "Dhaka Night College".

Khan Bahadur Abdur Rahman and Ataur Rahman Khan, both former prime ministers of Bangladesh, contributed significantly to the college's establishment. Khaney Alom Khan, former chairman of the college's governing body, arranged financial assistance for the development of the academic buildings while he was the divisional commissioner of Dhaka Division.

In 2025 and 2026, students at the college fought in the streets with pupils of Ideal College and Dhaka College, causing problems for traffic in the city. The colleges came to a "peace agreement" in 2025, but clashed again after that and in 2026.

== Academics ==
=== Degrees ===
One of the colleges of Dhaka Education Board, Dhaka City College provides education in Science, Business Studies and Humanities in the Higher Secondary School Certificate. Besides, this college affiliated to the National University, Bangladesh has arrangements on undergraduate and graduate programs.

=== Departments ===
There are a total of 9 departments in this college. Every department is decorated by one coordinator and well qualified and skilled teachers.

- Accounting
- Bangla
- Computer Science and Engineering (CSE)
- English
- Finance and Banking
- Economics
- Management
- Marketing
- BBA (Professional)

== Notable alumni ==
- Agun, singer-songwriter and Bachsas Awards winning actor.
- Bassbaba Sumon, vocalist, bassist, and founding member of Bangladeshi rock band Aurthohin.
- Mahiya Mahi, an actress in the Bangladeshi film industry.
- Maria Nur Rowshon, television presenter, radio personality, and winner of Babisas Award for modelling.
- Nishat Majumdar, first Bangladeshi female to scale Mount Everest.
- Sayeed Khokon, politician and mayor of Dhaka.
- Shahriar Alam, state deputy-minister of foreign affairs, The People's Republic of Bangladesh.
- Habibur Rashid Habib,Member of Parliament

== See also ==
- Dhaka Imperial College
- Dhaka Commerce College
- Dhaka College
- Comilla Victoria College
- Rajshahi College
- Notre Dame College, Dhaka
- Dhaka Residential Model College
