= Songsoptok =

Bangladeshi TV drama series

- সংশপ্তক
- Genre: Drama
- Based on: Songsoptok by Shahidullah Kaiser
- Directed by: Abdullah al Mamun Al Mansur, and Mohammad Abu Taher
- Country of origin: Bangladesh
- Original language: Bengali
- No. of seasons: 1

Original release
- Network: Bangladesh Television
- Release: 1988

Songsoptok (Shôngshôptôk) is a drama serial which aired on Bangladesh Television. It was first filmed in the year 1971, but filming was stopped after just four episodes as the liberation war started in March. After many years, filming restarted in 1988; but it was put on hold yet again after the widespread floods started. Filming was resumed after the floods ceased. It is based on the novel of the same name by Shahidullah Kaiser.

Various actors starred in the drama, including Humayun Faridi.

== Plot overview ==
The drama depicts the lives and struggles of the inhabitants of a village called Bakulia during the British Raj. The village has two influential but feuding families, the Miyas and the Syeds.

== Cast ==
- Humayun Faridi as Ramzan
- Ferdousi Mazumder as Hurmoti
- Suborna Mustafa as Rabu
- Mamunur Rashid as Sekandor Master
- Khalil Ullah Khan as Felu Mia
- Tarin Jahan as Rasu
- Tariq Anam Khan as Mejo Syed
- Suja Khondokar
