= Maria Nur Rowshon =

Bangladeshi television presenter

- মারিয়া নূর রৌশন
- Born: 21 March 1987 (age 39); Bangladesh
- Education: Dhaka City College
- Occupations: TV host, actress, model
- Years active: 2009–present
- Awards: Babisas Award

Maria Nur Rowshon (born 21 March 1987) is a Bangladeshi television presenter, actor and model. She entered in show business as a radio jockey and then became a TV host.

== Early life ==
Maria was born in Dhaka. Maria completed her Secondary education from Lalmatia Girls High School & Higher Secondary from Mohammadpur Preparatory School & College. She completed her graduation from Dhaka City College in accounting and did a diploma in fashion designing from Shanto-Mariam University of Creative Technology.

== Career ==
Maria Nur Rowshon started her career at ABC Radio in 2009 as a Radio Jockey (RJ). She entered in television media from 2012. In 2014, she came in limelight with Mostofa Sarwar Farooqi's television commercial for ekhanei.com. She won Babisas Award in "Best Model" category for her performance in the TVC series as a lead role.

Maria started her career in television with anchoring. She hosted more than 20 different television shows. She gained popularity as a host for sport shows during T20 World Cup 2014. She also acted in several fictions as the lead role including Five Female Friends, Jhalmuri, Dampotto, Lux Bhalobashar Shourobh-er Golpo.

== Television ==
Year	Title	Role	Television
2013	Circle The Globe	Host	Channel 24
2014	Traveller's Story	Host	Channel 9
2014	Cricket Blast	Host	Gazi Television
2014	Nitol Tata Ultimate World Cup	Host	Channel 24
2015	Ekhanei.com presents Cricket Extra	Host	Gazi Television
2016–2017	Late Night Coffee	Host	RTV
2017	Cricket Mania BPL	Host	Gazi Television
2016	Cricket Extra Asia Cup	Host	Gazi Television
2015	Robi Dekhiye Dao	Host	Gazi Television
2016	Lux Style Check	Host	14 channels at a time including NTV, RTV, Ekushey Television, Banglavision, ATN etc.
2018	Football Paa-Goal With Maria	Host	Nagorik
2018	Mariar Rannaghor	Host	Nagorik
2017	Shera Kontho	Host	Channel i
2018	Power Play (Asia Cup)[14]	Host	Maasranga
2019	Men's Fair n Lovely Channel i Hero[15]	Host	Channel I
2019	Expert Prediction (ICC World Cup)	Host	Maasranga
2017	Starnight	Host	Maasranga
2019	GPH Ispat Esho Robot Banai Grand Finale	Host	Channel I
2016–2017	Robi Cricket 360[16]	Host	Gazi Television
2016	Crcicket Crazy Titans (BPL)	Host	Gazi Television
2018	Celebrity Café	Host	Asian TV

== TV fictions ==
Year	Drama	Co-star	Director
2017	Dampotto	Siam Ahmed, Saberi Alam	Tauquir Ahmed
2016	Bhalobashar Rong	A. K. Azad	Shahid Un Nabi
2015	Five Female Friends	Masuma Rahman Nabila, Jannatul Ferdous Peya, Sriya, DJ Sonica	Mabrur Rashid Bannah, Imraul Rafat, Golam Muqtadir Shaan
2013	It can happen	Allen Shubhro, Tawsif Mahbub, Zakia Bari Mamo	Mabrur Rashid Bannah
2015	Jhalmuri	Safa Kabir, Allen Shubhro, Tawsif Mahbub, Mishu Sabbir	Redoan Rony
2017	Balobashar Shouarbh er Golpo	Purnima, Rafiath Rashid Mithila, Mehazabien Chowdhury, Safa Kabir and Zakia Bari Momo.	Shihab Shaheen, Redoan Rony, Shafayat Mansoor Rana, Mabrur Rashid Banna, Imraul Rafat, Tania Ahmed and Tauquir Ahmed
2021	Ladies & Gentlemen	Tasnia Farin, Afzal Hossain, Hasan Masood, Partha Barua, Chanchal Chowdhury, Iresh Zaker, Mamunur Rashid	Mostofa Sarwar Farooki

== TV commercials ==
Year	Brand Name	Director
2014	Ekhanei.com	Mostofa Sarwar Farooki
2015	Robi	Ashfaq Uzzaman Bipul
2015	Jui Coconut Oil	Golam Kibria Farooqi
2015	Pran Jhalmuri	Tito Rahman
2015	Robi	Piplu Khan
2017	Brooke Bond Taaza	Adnan Al Rajeev
2017	Eco plus	Rasel Shikder
2018	Parachute Advanced Extra Care	Shamim Khan
