= Syeda Wahida Sabrina =

Bangladeshi film actress

- সৈয়দা ওয়াহিদা সাবরিনা
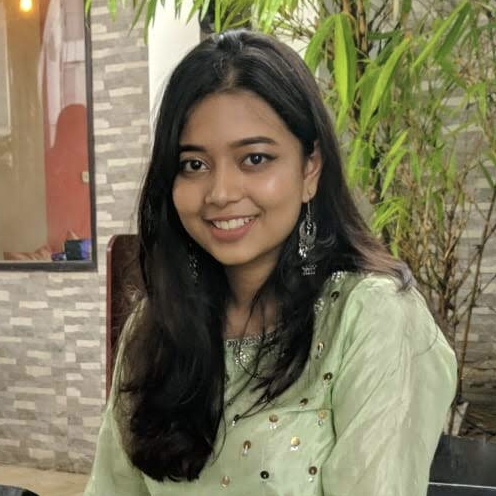
- Born: 2000-09-11; Chapainawabganj, Rajshahi, Bangladesh
- Occupation: Film Actor
- Years active: 2008–present
- Notable work: Gangajatra, Antardhan, Shesh Kotha
- Father: Syed Wahiduzzaman Diamond
- Awards: Bangladesh National Film Awards

Syeda Wahida Sabrina (born 11 September 2000) is a Bangladeshi film actress. She has won the Bangladesh National Film Award for Best Child Artist twice, for the films Gangajatra (2009) and Antardhan (2012). Apart from continuing her work as an actor, she has also written the subtitles for films such as Antardhan (2012), Shesh Kotha (2017) and Rohingya (Soon to be released). She has also assisted in various films and dramas, and continues to have an avid interest in filmmaking and linguistics. Sabrina earned the title of 2nd Runner Up in one of the biggest National Scale Business Competition, Ad Maker Bangladesh 2025.

== Selected films ==
- Gangajatra - 2009
- Antardhan - 2012
- Shesh Kotha - 2017
- Rohingya - 2022

== Television ==
Syeda Wahida Sabrina has worked in the drama 'Agnidan' directed by Syed Wahiduzzaman Diamond, starring Sumona Shoma as the lead role which was aired in 2008.

== Awards and nominations ==
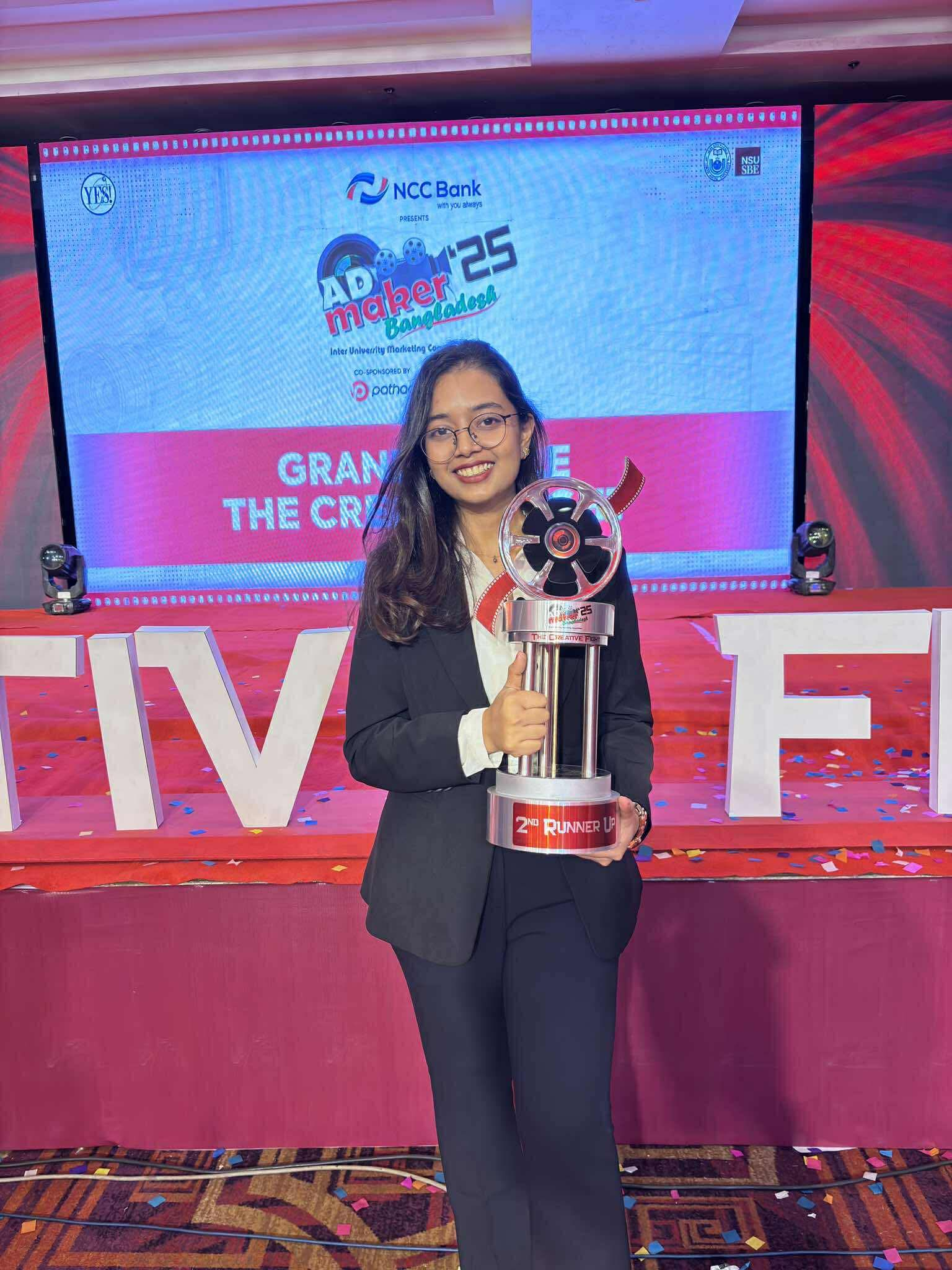

Sabrina with the trophy of Ad Maker Bangladesh 2025. Her team "ShahbADies" from IBA, DU consisting of Mehtaj and Shudipto were awarded the 2nd runner up trophy.

National Film Awards

Year	Award	Category	Film	Result	2009	National Film Award	Best Child Artist	Gangajatra	Won
2013	National Film Award	Best Child Artist	Antardhan	Won					
