= Palabi Kothay =

- Poster
- পালাবি কোথায়
- Directed by: Shahidul Islam Khokon
- Written by: Kazi Morshed
- Screenplay by: Shahidul Islam Khokon
- Produced by: Cine Plus
- Starring: Shabana; Suborna Mustafa; Champa; Humayun Faridi; Afzal Hossain
- Cinematography: Hasan Ahmed
- Edited by: Jinnat Hossain
- Music by: Alam Khan
- Distributed by: Cine Plus
- Release date: 9 February 1997
- Running time: 158 mins
- Country: Bangladesh
- Language: Bengali

Palabi Kothay is a Bangladeshi feminist comedy film released in 1997. Humayun Faridi produced the film. Palabi Kothay is one of flop films in Bangladesh.

== Plot ==
The film tells the story of three female characters struggling in the office. Shirin and Nuri are teased by the office boss and Millie teaches them to stand up against all these injustices. After many storms, problems and incidents, they are able to protest against the injustice.

== Cast ==
- Shabana as Mili Chowdhury
- Suborna Mustafa as Shirin
- Champa as Noorie
- Humayun Faridi as Mr. Hawlader
- Afzal Hossain as managing director (guest appearance)
- Ali Raj as Bachchu
- Khaleda Aktar Kolpona as Shirin's mother
- Khairul Islam Pakhi as Shirin's brother
- Sharmin as Salma, wife of Mr. Hawlader
- Nasir Khan as Lallu Khan
- Abdul Karim as old man in slum
- Sharbari Dasgupta
- Jacky Alamgir
- Sitara Begum
- Mozid Bongobasi
- Rasheda Chowdhury
- Alka Sarkar

== Production ==
Humayun Faridi was the main producer of the film. Shahidul Islam Khokon was filmmaker and director. He sold his house situated in Uttara to collect fund of this film

== Reception ==
Palabi Kothay shows a strong advocate for women's rights in a simple way. The film was well received by the audience after its release. It was highly acclaimed for its speeches and performances.

== Music ==
Palabi Kothay

Soundtrack album by Syed Abdul Hadi, Runa Laila
- Released: 1997
- Genre: Film music
- Language: Bengali

Palabi Kothay Soundtrack – Track listing
No.	Title	Lyrics	Singers	Length
1.	"Jadu re shona re o khukumoni re amake bhalobaso re"	Milton Khondokar	Syed Abdul Hadi, Runa Laila

== Awards ==
Award Title	Category	Awardee	Result
Bachsas Awards	Best supporting Actress	Champa	Won
Bachsas Awards	Best screenplay writer	Kazi Morshed	Won
Bachsas Awards	Special Jury Prize	Shahidul Islam Khokon	Won
