= Madam Fuli =

Bangladeshi film

- Poster
- Directed by: Shahidul Islam Khokon
- Screenplay by: Shahidul Islam Khokon
- Starring: Alexander Bo; Shimla; Bobita; Humayun Faridi
- Cinematography: Hasan Ahmed
- Edited by: Chishti Kamal
- Music by: Alam Khan
- Release date: 30 April 1999
- Country: Bangladesh
- Language: Bengali

Madam Fuli is a 1999 Bangladeshi film directed by Shahidul Islam Khokon. It stars debutants Shimla and Alexander Bo in lead roles while Bobita and Humayun Faridi in supporting roles. Shimla won Bangladesh National Film Award for Best Actress for her portrayal of 'Fuli'. Upon doing so, she became the only Bangladeshi actor, male or female, to win National Film Award for debut performance. ATM Shamsuzzaman won the Bangladesh National Film Awards for Best Comedian. This film is a remake of the 1982 Tamil language film Gopurangal Saivathillai.

== Synopsis ==
Fuli (Shimla) is an uneducated village girl. She lives in a village hut with her elderly mother. An influential person of the village was about to drown due to epilepsy. The influential man is very grateful to her and in return gives her off for marriage to his son. However, his son Sohail (Alexander Bo) does not consider Fuli as his wife and he falls in love with another girl named Fancy (Michaela). Fuli comes to Dhaka to live with her husband after marriage. Sohail does not give her proper rights as a wife. It is ugly to look at and is insulted by friends for singing. He accidentally gets lost and is found by his mother Salma. Salma (Babita) teaches him to be modern and smart and come back. An illiterate rural girl makes herself modern and clever to get her husband's rights. Later, her husband becomes interested in getting her back.

== Cast ==
- Alexander Bo - Mizanur Rahman Sohel
- Shimla - Fuli / Shimla
- Michela - Fancy
- Babita - Salma
- Humayun Faridi - Kalam Ali
- ATM Shamsuzzaman - Dad
- Sheikh Abul Kashem Mithun - Shahid
- Khalil Ullah Khan - Matbar
- Rasheda Chowdhury - Rahima

== Music ==
The film's songs have been composed by Alam Khan and penned by Milton Khondokar.

- "Monke Boli Tomari Kotha Jotobar" - Kanak Chapa and Agun

== Awards ==
Award	Category	Result	Reference(s)
Bangladesh National Film Awards	Best Actress	Shimla	
Bangladesh National Film Awards	Best Comedian	ATM Shamsuzzaman	
