= Nacholer Rani =

- Nacholer Rani movie poster
- Directed by: Syed Wahiduzzaman Diamond
- Cinematography: Akhtar Hossain
- Edited by: Manir Hossain
- Production company: Pankouri
- Release date: June 30, 2006
- Country: Bangladesh
- Language: Bengali

Nacholer Rani (Queen of Nachol) is a 2006 Bangladeshi film. It is based on the early 1950s Santhal people uprising in Nachol Upazila in Chapai Nawabganj District, East Bengal and the role of social activist and reformer Ila Mitra. The film was the feature-length debut of director Syed Wahiduzzaman Diamond.

== Plot summary ==
In 1950, Mitra took up the cause of the Santhals. She was married to Ramendra Nath Mitra, a zamindar of Ramchandrapur in Nachol. She left her lavish life and fought for the ill-treated Santhals. She garnered recognition for her dedication to their cause. She was treated as an uncrowned queen by the Santhals. They gave her the title Rani Ma (Queen mother).

== Production ==
Diamond was the costume designer and scriptwriter as well. Shahana Shumi played the role of Ila Mitra. Other actors were Kajol Majumder, Rabiul Islam, Afsana Rahman, Sajjad, Ripon, and Tapon. About 450 Santhals and 250 policemen performed in the film. Ivana and Anima De Costa were the playback singers.

The theatrical release of the film was on June 30, 2006, which was observed as the 150th anniversary of the Santhal rebellion.

== Reception ==
The film was screened at the 10th Dhaka International Film Festival. Diamond was awarded Atandra Padak for his direction of this film and Gangajatra.
