= Bangladesh Cine-Journalist Association =

Organisation of film journalists

- বাংলাদেশ চলচ্চিত্র সাংবাদিক সমিতি (বাচসাস)
- Abbreviation: Bachsas
- Merged into: Pakistan Cine-Journalist Association
- Formation: April 5, 1968; 58 years ago
- Founded at: East Bengal
- Type: Journalist organization
- Legal status: NGO
- Purpose: Working for the welfare of moviegoers
- Headquarters: Dhaka, Bangladesh
- Services: Bachsas Awards Distribute
- Official language: Bengali language
- Secretary General: Rahat Saiful
- President: Kamrul Hasan Darpan

The Bangladesh Cine-Journalist Association (Bachsas; Bengali: বাংলাদেশ চলচ্চিত্র সাংবাদিক সমিতি) is an organization of film journalists. It was first established under the name Pakistan Film Journalist Association in Dhaka in East Pakistan. After the independence of Bangladesh, it was renamed as the Bangladesh Cine-Journalist Association. It was revived in 1973–74 with the introduction of the Bachsas Awards. Kamrul Hasan Darpan is its president.

== History ==
=== Naming ===
The Pakistan Film Journalists Association was formed at a meeting of the film journalists of Pakistan on 5 April 1968.

=== Golden Jubilee ===
The association hasn't held an awards ceremony consistently every year. It marked its golden jubilee in 2019 by distributing five years worth of awards, from 2014 to 2018, in one ceremony. The jubilee celebration also included film screening, seminars, and discussions.

== Bachsas Award ==
Bangladesh Cine-Journalists' Association gave out their most prestigious awards to outstanding performers in film, television, music, dance and theatre.

== See also ==
- National Film Awards
