= Ladies & Gentlemen (TV series) =

Bangladeshi television series

- Genre: Drama
- Created by: Mostofa Sarwar Farooki
- Written by: Mostofa Sarwar Farooki
- Directed by: Mostofa Sarwar Farooki
- Starring: Tasnia Farin; Afzal Hossain; Hasan Masood; Maria Nur; Partha Barua; Iresh Zaker; Mostafa Monwar; Mamunur Rashid; Saberi Alam; Nader Chowdhury; Chanchal Chowdhury
- Music by: Pavel Areen
- Country of origin: Bangladesh
- Original language: Bengali
- No. of seasons: 1
- No. of episodes: 8

Production
- Producers: Nusrat Imrose Tisha; Iresh Zaker; Sardar Saniat Hossain
- Production location: Bangladesh
- Cinematography: Alexey Kosorukov; Sheikh Rajibul Islam
- Editor: Momin Biswas Rashaduzzaman Shohag (Worked as a Colourist)
- Production company: Chabial Production

Original release
- Network: ZEE5
- Release: 9 July 2021

Ladies & Gentlemen is a Bangladeshi drama streaming television series created by Mostofa Sarwar Farooki. Starring Tasnia Farin as Sabila Hossain, an ordinary girl, the other main cast includes Afzal Hossain, Hasan Masood, Maria Nur, Partha Barua, Chanchal Chowdhury, Iresh Zaker, Mostafa Monwar, Mamunur Rashid and Saberi Alam. The series was released on 9 July 2021 on ZEE5.

== Premise ==
The series follows the personal journey of Sabila (Tasnia Farin), a common girl, who becomes the voice of every working woman in Bangladesh and beyond. The show brings out the complexity of male-female dynamics and hierarchical exploitations and misogyny.

== Cast ==
- Tasnia Farin as Sabila Hossain
- Afzal Hossain as Khairul Alom
- Maria Nur as Laura
- Hasan Masood as Mizu/Mizanur Rahaman
- Partha Barua as Imtiyaz
- Mamunur Rashid as Sabila's Father
- Saberi Alam
- Mostafa Monwar as Arif
- Iresh Zaker as Jahir
- Nader Chowdhury
- Chanchal Chowdhury (special appearance)

== Release ==
On 14 June 2021, the official trailer for the series was released at a virtual press conference.

== Episodes ==
Series	Episodes	Originally released
1	8	9 July 2021

=== Series 1 (2021) ===
No. overall	Episode	Directed by	Written by	Original release date
1	La Dolce Vita	Mostofa Sarwar Farooki	Mostofa Sarwar Farooki	9 July 2021
2	Masculine Feminine	Mostofa Sarwar Farooki	Mostofa Sarwar Farooki	9 July 2021
3	A Woman is After All a Woman	Mostofa Sarwar Farooki	Mostofa Sarwar Farooki	9 July 2021
4	Time to Live, Time to Die	Mostofa Sarwar Farooki	Mostofa Sarwar Farooki	9 July 2021
5	For Whom the Bell Tolls	Mostofa Sarwar Farooki	Mostofa Sarwar Farooki	9 July 2021
6	Hiroker Rajar Deshe	Mostofa Sarwar Farooki	Mostofa Sarwar Farooki	9 July 2021
7	Egos are as Fragile as Eggs	Mostofa Sarwar Farooki	Mostofa Sarwar Farooki	9 July 2021
8	Oporajita	Mostofa Sarwar Farooki	Mostofa Sarwar Farooki	9 July 2021

== Awards ==
Award Title	Category	Awardee	Result	Ref
Blender's Choice–The Daily Star Awards	Best Female Actor (popular category)	Tasnia Farin	Won	
