= Biman Bangladesh Airlines Flight 147 =

2019 aircraft hijacking over Bangladesh

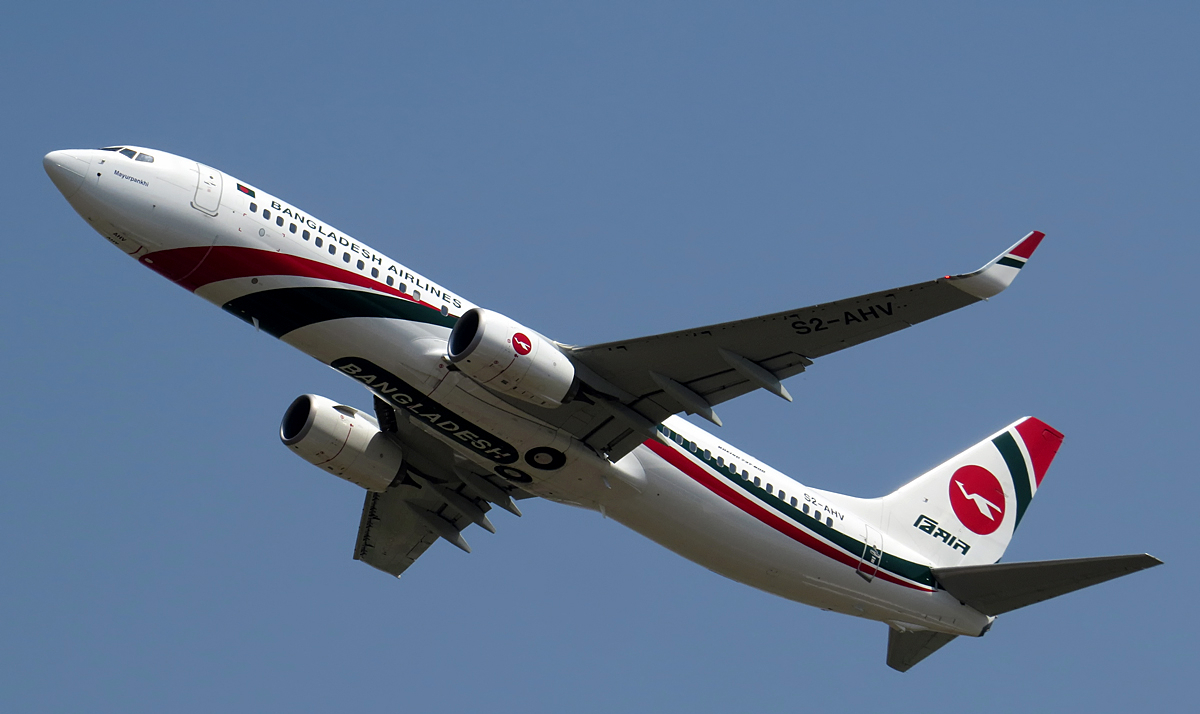
- S2-AHV, the aircraft involved in the hijacking, seen in 2016

Hijacking
- Date: 24 February 2019
- Summary: Attempted hijacking
- Site: Hijacked 252 km southeast of Dhaka. Emergency landing performed at Chittagong airport.

Aircraft
- Aircraft type: Boeing 737-8E9
- Aircraft name: Mayurpankhi
- Operator: Biman Bangladesh Airlines
- IATA flight No.: BG147
- ICAO flight No.: BBC147
- Call sign: BANGLADESH 147
- Registration: S2-AHV
- Flight origin: Dhaka, Bangladesh
- Stopover: Chittagong, Bangladesh
- Destination: Dubai, UAE
- Occupants: 148 (including hijacker)
- Passengers: 134 (including hijacker)
- Crew: 14
- Fatalities: 1 (hijacker)
- Injuries: 1
- Survivors: 147

Biman Bangladesh Airlines Flight 147 was a scheduled flight from Shahjalal International Airport, Bangladesh, to Dubai International Airport, United Arab Emirates, via Chittagong. On 24 February 2019, the aircraft operating the flight, a Biman Bangladesh Airlines Boeing 737-800, was hijacked 252 kilometres (157 mi) southeast of Dhaka by Polash Ahmed, acting alone. The crew performed an emergency landing at the Shah Amanat International Airport in Chittagong where Ahmed was shot dead by Bangladeshi special forces. There were no other reported casualties among the 134 passengers and 14 crew on board.

== Aircraft ==
The Boeing 737-8E9 aircraft (MSN: 40335/5715) registered S2-AHV was built in 2015 and first flew on 11 December 2015. The aircraft was the second of the type delivered new to Biman Bangladesh Airlines from Boeing in late 2015. At the time of the hijacking, the aircraft was 3 years and 3 months old.

== Events ==
=== Prior to hijacking ===
According to FlightAware, S2-AHV was flying its third flight of the day as Flight 147. It had previously flown a round trip between Shahjalal International Airport and Shah Amanat International Airport, and a special flight carrying Prime Minister of Bangladesh Sheikh Hasina to Chittagong, on that day. The aircraft was serviced and flight and cabin crew were changed, and just under two hours later at 17:13, the aircraft departed for Dubai.

=== Hijacking ===
Early reports said the perpetrator was armed with a pistol, fired several shots, and claimed to have a bomb. A local police official later said the gun was fake, and the next day the government would not confirm that he had a weapon of any kind, real or fake. The plane diverted and performed an emergency landing. Passengers were evacuated. The suspected hijacker was identified as a man in his mid-30s who demanded to speak with his wife, and then Prime Minister Sheikh Hasina.

=== Assault ===
The 737 was boarded by Bangladeshi special forces who demanded that the hijacker surrender. When the hijacker failed to comply, he was shot, and died shortly thereafter. It is not known how many shots were fired.

== Hijacker ==
The Rapid Action Battalion identified the hijacker as Polash Ahmed from Narayanganj, Bangladesh, after a fingerprints match in the criminal database. He was previously accused in an abduction case filed on 22 February 2012. He used Mahibi Jahan as his Facebook profile name.

He was the former husband of National Film Award winning actress Shimla; the couple divorced in November 2018. He had a two-year-old son from an earlier marriage.
