= Syed Ahsan Ali Sydney =

Bangladeshi film actor

Syed Ahsan Ali Sydney (3 October 1938 — 14 February 2002) is a Bangladeshi film actor. Syed Ahsan Ali was a well-known handsome face in various movies and TV dramas of the 70s and 80s. He was also known by the nickname Sidney. Notable films he acted in are — Paye Chalar Path (1973), Megh Bijli Badal (1983) and Danpite Chhele (1980). He, being a legendary actor of Bengali drama and film Syed Ahsan Ali was the first National Award winning actor on Bangladesh Television (BTV).

== Personal life ==
Syed Ahsan Ali, married Suraiya Ahsan, an educationist. Sidney's son Jeetu Ahsan has become an actor like his father.

Sidney's father, Syed Mohammad Ali, was a zamindar and his father-in-law, Maulvi Emdad Ali, was a district magistrate in British India.

Sidney was a 1955 batch of St. Gregory's School.

== Career ==
In his college life Bulbul Ahmed, Nazmul Huda Bachchu and other friends formed a theater group.

He made his film debut opposite actress Kabori in Chorabali, where his performance was praised. Sidney was opposite to actress Jayashree Kabir in the film Suryakanya. His performance in the film's iconic song 'Chena Chena Lage Tabu Achena', which is still on everyone's lips, his acting in the film was also memorable. His notable films are — Dahan, Surjo Othar Age, Mayamrigo, Rupali Soikote, Swami, Ayna, Phulshajja etc.

Notable plays he acted in are — Saat Asmaner Siri, Jonaki Jwale, Ekti Setur Galpo, Hazar Bochor Pore, Aami Tumi Se, Saatjan Jatri etc.

== TV presence ==
Notable list of dramas
Year	Title	Director	Co-artist	চ্যানেল	টীকা
1982	Ekti Shetur Golpo	Mostafizur Rahman	Jeetu Ahsan	BTV	drama
1984	Pearl	Mostafizur Rahman	Jeetu Ahsan	BTV	drama
1984	Shesh Manusher Thikana	Syed Siddique Hossain	Jeetu Ahsan	BTV	drama
1985	Shat Jon Jatri	Mostafizur Rahman	Jeetu Ahsan	BTV	drama
1990	Jonaki Jole	Zia Ansari	Jeetu Ahsan	BTV	drama serial
1993	Upotkuto Chai	Syed Siddique Hossain	Apu Sarkar, Jeetu Ahsan	BTV	drama
1995	Ek Nokkhotrer Niche	Syed Siddique Hossain	Rubina Parvin Runa, Jeetu Ahsan	BTV	drama
1996	Khela Bittngar Khela	Syed Ahsan Ali	Tonima Hamid, Jeetu Ahsan	BTV	drama

== Death ==
Syed Ahsan Ali died in Dhaka on February 14, 2002 after a long illness. His wife Suraiya Ahsan died on July 12, 2019 at the age of 80 at Queens Hospital in New York.
