= Shimla (actress) =

Bangladeshi film actress

- শিমলা
- Born: Shamsun Nahar Shimla; 4 December 1982 (age 43)
- Occupations: Actress and Film Star
- Years active: 1999–2017
- Spouse: Palash Ahmed (m. 2018; div. 2018)
- Awards: National Film Award

Shamsun Nahar Shimla (known as Shimla; born 4 December 1982) is a Bangladeshi film actress. She won Bangladesh National Film Award for Best Actress for her debut film Madam Fuli (1999).

== Career ==
Shimla originated from a small town of Jhenaidah. She debuted in acting through her performance in the film Madam Fuli (1999).

Shimla was married to Palash Ahmed for eight months in 2018. Ahmed was involved in an attempt of aircraft hijacking incident in 2019 in which he was killed in a commando operation. Shimla met him in a birthday party of the director of the film Naiar (2017).

== Works ==
Films

- Madam Fuli (1999) - Fuli / Shimla
- Pagla Ghonta (1999)
- Bheja Biral (2001)
- Dhawa (2001)
- Thekao Mastan (2001) - Sonali
- Uttejito (2002)
- Kafon Chara Dafon (2002)
- Bhalobashar Mullo Koto (2002)
- Boma Hamla (2002)
- Oshanto Agun (2002)
- Hason Raja (2002)
- Amar Target (2004) - Sheila
- Lootpaat (2004)
- Mejaj Gorom
- Lal Sobuj (2005) - Nila
- Chotto Ektu Bhalobasha (2005)
- Sagorer Gorjon (2005) - Bonna
- Na Bolona (2006)
- Porom Priyo (2006)
- Jhontu Montu Dui Bhai (2007)
- Choto Bon (2008)
- Akkel Alir Nirbachon (2008) - Moyna
- Na Manush
- Gangajatra (2009) - Rupa
- Zamidaar (2010)
- Jekhane Tumi Sekhane Ami (2010)
- Mayer Gaye Biyer Sharee (2011)
- Bhool (2011)
- Rupgawal (2013)
- Nekabborer Mohaproyan (2014) - Fatema
- Nishiddho Premer Golpo (formally Prem Kahan) - Maria
- Naiyor
