= 35th Bachsas Awards =

Bangladeshi film awards ceremony in 2014

- Awarded for: outstanding performers of the silver screen, small screen, music, dance and theatre in 2013
- Awarded by: Bangladesh Cine-Journalists' Association
- Presented by: Bangladesh Cine-Journalists' Association
- Presented on: December 27, 2014
- Site: Dhaka, Bangladesh

Highlights
- Best Film: Mrittika Maya
- Best Actor: Titas Zia (Mrittika Maya)
- Best Actress: Apu Biswas (My Name Is Khan); Mahiya Mahi (Bhalobasha Aaj Kal)

The 35th Bachsas Awards were given by the Bangladesh Cholochitra Sangbadik Samity (Bangladesh Cine-Journalists' Association) to outstanding performers of the silver screen, small screen, music, dance, and theatre in 2013. The awards were introduced in 1972 to encourage the fledgling film industry of the country.

== List of winners ==
=== Film ===
| Name of Awards | Winner(s) | Film |
|---|---|---|
| Best Film | Gazi Rakayet and Faridur Reza Sagar | Mrittika Maya |
| Best Director | Gazi Rakayet | Mrittika Maya |
| Best Actor | Titas Zia | Mrittika Maya |
| Best Actress | Apu Biswas; Mahiya Mahi | My Name Is Khan; Bhalobasha Aaj Kal |
| Best Supporting Actor | Kabila | Bhalobasha Aaj Kal |
| Best Supporting Actress | Champa | Rupgaowal |
| Best Music Director | A.K. Azad | Mrittika Maya |
| Best Lyrics | Kabir Bakul | Purno Doirgho Prem Kahini (Ami Nissho Hoye Jabo) |
| Best Male Playback Singer | Chandan Sinha | Purno Doirgho Prem Kahini (Ami Nissho Hoye Jabo) |
| Best Female Playback Singer | Sabina Yasmin | Eve-teasing (Soi Lo Soi) |
| Best Story | Gazi Rakayet | Mrittika Maya |
| Best Dialogue | Ananya Jaman | Shikhandi Kotha |
| Best Cinematography | Gazi Rakayet | Mrittika Maya |
| Best Screenplay | Saiful Islam Badal | Mrittika Maya |
| Best Art Direction | Uttom Guha | Mrittika Maya |
| Best Editing | Shoriful Islam Naser | Mrittika Maya |
