= Dhaka Imperial College =

- ঢাকা ইমপিরিয়াল কলেজ
- logo since 1995

Location
- Plot#35–43, Block#B, Road#2, Jahurul Islam City, Aftab Nagar; Dhaka, 1212; Bangladesh
- Coordinates: 23.76621°N 90.42995°E

Information
- Type: Private
- Motto: (Bengali: পড় তোমার প্রভূর নামে) (Read in the Name of Thy Creator)
- Established: November 1995
- School district: Dhaka Education Board
- Principal: Arif Ahmed (2017–present)
- Staff: 34
- Teaching staff: 80
- Grades: 11-12
- Age range: 17–20
- Language: Bengali
- Campus: Badda, Dhaka, 1212
- Campus type: Urban
- Houses: One
- Sports: Football, cricket, volleyball, rugby, badminton, handball
- Website: imperialcollege.edu.bd

Dhaka Imperial College (DIC) (Bengali: ঢাকা ইমপিরিয়াল কলেজ) is a co-educational Bangladeshi private college situated in Dhaka, Bangladesh established at 1995.

== History ==
Dhaka Imperial College was established in November 1995 at New Market, Dhaka opposite of Dhaka College, then transfer to Badda, Dhaka in 2012 on their own campus.

=== Founders ===
The college was founded in November 1995 by some educationists and social workers person including M. A. Malek (established secretary), Waliullah, Mahafuzul Haque (ex-principal who died in 2013) and others.

== Academics ==
Dhaka Imperial College offers H.S.C., four years Honours in various majors.

=== H.S.C ===
- Science
- Business Studies
- Humanity

=== Honours ===
- Bangla Department (Under National University)
- English Department (Under National University)
- Accounting Department (Under National University)
- Management Department (Under National University)
- Marketing Department (Under National University)

== Students ==
Every year Dhaka Imperial College admits around 1000 students in science, 200 in Humanities and 800 in Business Studies group through the admission process in the country. With a few number of GPA holders in Public Examination (SSC), Dhaka Imperial College accepts students with mid-range GPAs holders in various faculty. Currently, it consists of 16 classrooms for boys & girls students in science terming each as "Groups". In case of science, groups A to L without 'G' includes boys and the rest 'G' divided into four sections G-1, G-2, G-3 and G-4 are for girls students. Humanities has groups A-1 and A-2 with combine while the Business Studies section has groups A-1, A-2 B-1, B-2.

== Clubs ==
Dhaka Imperial College has 14 extracurricular clubs including:

- Dhaka Imperial College Debating Club (DICDC)
- Imperial Science Club (ISC)
- Imperial Nandon Kanon
- Imperial Information Technology Club (IITC)
- Imperial English Language Club (IELC)
- Imperial Rover Scouts (IRS)
- Imperial Tour Club (ITC)
- Imperial Business Club (IBC)
- Imperial Phatchakra
- Imperial Sports Club (ISC)
- Imperial Creative Photography (ICP)
- Imperial Career Improving Club (ICIC)
- Imperial Shomajsheba o Shashaamulok Club
- Imperial Sketchbook Community (ISC)

=== Dhaka Imperial College Debating Club (DICDC) ===
Dhaka Imperial College Debating Club (DICDC) was established in 1995 at the time of the beginning of the college.

=== Imperial Science Club (ISC) ===
Imperial Science Club is the first science club in this college. It was established in 1998 by Professor Mahafuzul Haque, Ex-principal of Dhaka Imperial College and also the founder of most of the club in the college.

=== Imperial Tour Club (ITC) ===
Imperial Tour Club also known as ITC is one of the major clubs in the college. Every year at the middle of the session this club arranges a tour of Bangladesh for seven days to tourist areas including Sundarban, Cox's Bazar, Bandarban, Rangamati and more. After study tour it also arranges another big arrangement in February named "Banvoson & Basanto Utsho (Bengali: বনভোজন ও বসন্ত উৎসব)" outside of Dhaka, specifically Gazipur for all students of the college. Sometimes it arranges a tour need 'SAARC Tour' to SAARC included country (without Pakistan and Afghanistan) with a few teachers and students.

=== Imperial Nandon Kanon (Bengali: ইমপিরিয়াল নন্দন কানন) ===
Imperial Nandon Kanon is said to ne the most active club in Dhaka Imperial College. Every year one the biggest ceremony in the college, "Nobin Boron," is fully arranged by the help of the club for the new student. Every culture-related program is arranged with help of this club. Every year it publishes its annual magazine.

=== Imperial English Language Club (IELC) ===
Imperial English Language Club, also known as IELC, is the major English based club in Dhaka Imperial College. It arranges a major course in English development in 10 long class around a year for developing speaking and free writing in English for the students of the college.

== Labs ==
This college has one of the latest lab facilities among private college in Dhaka City. They rebuilt their lab and upgraded it to a modern lab in mid-2018.

- Physics lab
- Chemistry lab
- Biology lab
- Computer lab
