= Monpura =

Bangladeshi film

- Film poster
- Directed by: Giasuddin Selim
- Written by: Giasuddin Selim
- Produced by: Anjan Chowdhury
- Starring: Chanchal Chowdhury; Farhana Mili; Fazlur Rahman Babu; Mamunur Rashid; Monir Khan Shimul
- Cinematography: Kamrul Hasan Khosru
- Edited by: Iqbal E. Kabir
- Music by: Shayan Chowdhury Arnob
- Distributed by: Maasranga Production
- Release date: 13 February 2009
- Running time: 138 minutes
- Country: Bangladesh
- Language: Bengali
- Box office: ৳8 crore (equivalent to ৳23 crore or US$1.8 million in 2024)

Monpura (Bengali: মনপুরা) is a 2009 Bangladeshi Bengali film directed by Giasuddin Selim. Considered by critics one of the greatest Bangladeshi films ever made, it has become a cult classic due to its performances and music.

A romantic tragedy set in rural Bangladesh, Monpura stars Chanchal Chowdhury and Farhana Mili. Supporting actors are Mamunur Rashid and Fazlur Rahman Babu. Its soundtrack was composed by Shayan Chowdhury Arnob.

Monpura was Selim's film debut and its contemporary-folk soundtrack was released before the film was screened, so the film received considerable advance publicity. It set a box-office record during its first week, and its soundtrack album became one of Bangladesh's most popular. Monpura is the highest-grossing Bangladeshi film of 2009 and the 23rd highest-grossing film of all time. The film was critically praised, particularly for its performances and cinematography. Monpura received five awards at the 34th Bangladesh National Film Awards (Best Film, Best Actor, Best Actor in a Negative Role, Best Female Playback Singer, and Best Screenplay), the first 21st-century film to do so. It was remade in Indian Bengali in 2010 as Achin Pakhi, directed by Anjan Das.

== Plot ==
Shonai is a manservant for Gazi, a rich man. Gazi's son Halim is mentally unstable, and murders a woman who also worked in the house. Gazi insists that Shonai takes responsibility for the murder and leaves him on Monpura Island; he falls in love with Pori, the daughter of a fisherman. Gazi intends for Halim to marry Pori, although he had promised her to Shonai. Her father did not accept the proposal at first, because of concerns about Halim's sanity; when Gazi offers his property to Pori, however, he accepts. Shonai discovers Gazi's plot and goes to Pori's house to meet her father, who ridicules his poverty. Pori and Shonai decide to flee the following night, but when Shonai is leaving for Pori's house he is arrested for the murder; Pori waits all night in vain. She is then married to Halim against her will, and is unhappy with him because of his mental illness. Her aunt and father came to visit her, and her aunt gives her hope. Pori waits for Shonai, who wants to be free to meet her. Realizing that Pori cannot get over Shonai, Gazi's wife says that Shonai will be executed on Friday at 12:01 am. Shonai is acquitted, however, and is released on Saturday. Pori, who thinks that he will be executed on Friday, kills herself by drinking poison at midnight that day. After Shonai arrives the next morning, he is devastated by Pori's death.

== Cast ==
- Chanchal Chowdhury as Shonai, a fisherman who lives on Monpura Island. He has a little house there, talks with animals, and falls in love with Pori.
- Farhana Mili as Pori, the daughter of a fisherman, who falls in love with Shonai
- Fazlur Rahman Babu as Pori's father, a fisherman
- Mamunur Rashid as Gazi, Shonai's boss
- Shirin Alam as Gazi's wife
- Monir Khan Shimul as Halim, Gazi's insane son

== Production ==
=== Development ===
Monpura was highly publicised before its release. Its unusual songs and rural landscape are the background of an artistic romance film. Monpura (unlike other popular Bangla films) uses Bangladesh's rural settings, to which director Giasuddin Selim said that audiences are strongly attached. Jackie Kabir wrote for Star Weekend that "the picturisation, the setting of the island named Monpura is what has made the movie unique. Moreover, it is not only a love story; there is a hidden satire in it".

=== Filming ===
Filming began in June 2007 in several locations, including remote areas of Bogra, Kushtia and Dhaka. The film unit faced problems during Bangladesh's rainy season, and several outdoor scenes were filmed in the rain.

== Reception ==
Monpura was released in four theaters in Dhaka and Rajshahi before opening in theaters in Chittagong, Mymensingh, Bogra, Rangpur, and Sirajganj. The film broke a 45-year Dhaka box-office record with over 50,000 tickets sold in its first three weeks, surpassing 1956's Mukh O Mukhosh (the first Bangla-language film made in Bangladesh). It was released in Sydney on 8 August 2009, followed by releases in New York City, Toronto, Montreal, and Brussels.

=== Remake ===
West Bengal filmmaker Anjan Das made the Indian Bengali film Achin Pakhi (2010), based on Monpura.

== Awards ==
=== National Film Awards ===
Monpura won in five categories at the National Film Awards, including Best Film.

- Best Film: Anjan Chowdhury Pintu
- Best Actor: Chanchal Chowdhury (shared with Ferdous Ahmed for Gongajatra)
- Best Villain Character: Mamunur Rashid
- Best Screenplay: Giasuddin Selim
- Best Singer: Chondona Mazumder and Kazi Krishnokoli Islam

=== Meril-Prothom Alo Awards ===
- Best Film Actor: Mamunur Rashid

== Soundtrack ==
Monpura

Soundtrack album by Arnob
- Released: August 2008
- Recorded: Bengal Studio
- Genre: Film soundtrack
- Label: Laser Vision

Bangla films are rarely noted for their music. It was thought that the music from Monpura was Bangladeshi folk music, but almost all are original songs. The album has been noted for its depth, creativity, and trend-breaking.

"Shonai Hai Haire," written by director Giasuddin Selim, is the story of a daughter's death and funeral attended by her father and father-in-law. "Aage Jodi Jantam," with words and music by Krishnokoli Islam, is about a girl's broken heart. "Shonar Moyna Pakhi," with words and music by Osman Khan and sung by Arnob, expresses the desire to see a loved one at any cost comes before one's death. The soundtrack was released in August 2008 by Laser Vision.

=== Track list ===
No.	Title	Bengali title	Lyrics	Artist(s)	Length
1	"Nithua Pathare-1"	নিথুয়া পাথারে-১	Various	Fazlur Rahman Babu	3:56
2	"Jao Pakhi Bolo Tare-1"	যাও পাখি বল তারে-১	Krishnokoli Islam	Chandana Mazumdar, Krishnokoli Islam	3:12
3	"Sonar Moyna Pakhi"	সোনার ময়না পাখি	Mohammad Osman Khan	Arnob	4:34
4	"Nithua Pathare-2"	নিথুয়া পাথারে-২	Various	Krishnokoli Islam, Chanchal Chowdhury	3:02
5	"Sonai Hay Hay Re"	সোনাই হায় হায়রে	Giasuddin Selim	Fazlur Rahman Babu	2:54
6	"Jao Pakhi Bolo Tare-2"	যাও পাখি বল তারে-২	Krishnokoli Islam	Krishnokoli Islam	3:28
7	"Nithua Pathare-3"	নিথুয়া পাথারে-৩	Various	Fazlur Rahman Babu	3:08
8	"Aage Jodi Jantam"	আগে যদি জানতাম	Krishnokoli Islam	Momtaz	3:17
9	"Soundtrack"	সাউন্ড ট্র্যাক (নির্বাচিত)	Various	Instrumental	4:44
