= Bangla (2006 film) =

- Poster
- Directed by: Shahidul Islam Khokon
- Written by: Ahmed Sofa
- Story by: Ahmed Sofa
- Based on: Ongkar by Ahmed Sofa
- Starring: Mahfuz Ahmed; Shabnur; Humayun Faridi
- Production company: Impress Telefilm
- Release date: 14 July 2006
- Country: Bangladesh
- Language: Bengali

Bangla is a Bangladeshi film released in 2006, directed by Shahidul Islam Khokon. The film is based on Ongkar, the famous novel written by Ahmed Sofa, set against the backdrop of the 1952 Bengali Language Movement.

It portrays the life of a speech-impaired girl and highlights the social context of East Bengal at that time, along with the oppression carried out by Pakistani collaborators. The lead role in the film was played by Shabnur, while Mahfuz Ahmed and Humayun Faridi acted as her husband and father respectively. It is the second cinema released in Bangladesh about the Language movement.

== Plot ==
In 1952, during the historic Language Movement demanding Bangla as the state language of East Bengal, Sukhi (Shabnur) a speech-impaired girl eagerly ran to her window at the sound of every procession, desperate to join the chants. Despite her family's obliviousness and her relentless struggles to speak, no sound came out. In the film's poignant climax, through sheer determination and intense physical agony as blood streams from her mouth while clutching her throat she miraculously utters her very first word "Bangla".

== Cast ==
- Mahfuz Ahmed
- Shabnur as Sukhi
- Humayun Faridi
