= Gohin Baluchor =

- Promotional poster
- গহীন বালুচর
- Directed by: Badrul Anam Saud
- Written by: Badrul Anam Saud
- Produced by: Suborna Mustafa and Badrul Anam Saud
- Starring: Neelanjona Neela; Abu Hurayra Tanvir; Jannatun Nur Moon
- Cinematography: Komol Chandra Das
- Edited by: Badrul Anam Saud
- Music by: Emon Saha
- Production companies: Shaatkahon and Friends Movies International
- Distributed by: Jaaz Multimedia
- Release date: December 29, 2017
- Running time: 148 minutes
- Country: Bangladesh
- Language: Bengali

Gohin Baluchor (Bengali: গহীন বালুচর) is a 2017 Bangladeshi drama film directed by Badrul Anam Saud and starring Suborna Mustafa, Raisul Islam Asad, Fazlur Rahman Babu, Afroza Banu, Jeetu Ahsan, Runa Khan, Shormi Mala, Shahana Rahman Sumi, Neelanjona Neela, Abu Hurayra Tanvir, Jannatun Nur Moon

== Plot ==
This film is about a love story between a boy and a girl living in a village (Dapdapia under the Nalchity upazila of Jhalokathi District) which is very near the sugandha river. One day a piece of floating land (Chor) rises in the water. This piece of land was once submerged in the river. The feud between two villages over the ownership of the risen land and the fate of the star crossed lovers will unfold in this film. The story will mirror the longing desires, determined struggles, hope & frustration, personal interest, big or little sorrows and happiness of the villagers.

== Cast ==
- Suborna Mustafa
- Raisul Islam Asad
- Fazlur Rahman Babu
- Neelanjona Neela
- Abu Hurayra Tanvir
- Jannatun Nur Moon
- Runa Khan
- Jeetu Ahsan
- Shahadat Hossain
- Shormi Mala
- Shahnaz Sumi
- Afroza Banu
- Lutfur Rahman George
- Abdullah Al Mamun
- Md Rasel Mahamud

== Release ==
Previously announced the movie release date is October 20, But the director has decided to release on December 29, 2017. The movie was released in 28 cinemas. The reason is the success of Dhaka Attack, Saud explains, "At this moment, the picture of Dipankar Deepan, Director of Dhaka Attack is doing very well. We both worked on a small screen. The first picture of both So I turned my picture behind." The story, 'Gohin Baluchor', is a dialogue and screenplay, written by director Saud himself.
