= Vondo =

Vondo Вондо
- Settlement
- Location within Volgograd Oblast Location within Russia
- Coordinates: 49°03′N 45°00′E
- Country: Russia
- Region: Volgograd Oblast
- District: Sredneakhtubinsky District
- Time zone: UTC+4:00

Vondo (Russian: Вондо) is a rural locality (a settlement) in Rakhinskoye Rural Settlement, Sredneakhtubinsky District, Volgograd Oblast, Russia. The population was 28 as of 2010.

== Geography ==
Vondo is located 52 km northeast of Srednyaya Akhtuba (the district's administrative centre) by road. Rakhinka is the nearest rural locality.
