= Syed Wahiduzzaman Diamond =

Bangladeshi film director

- সৈয়দ অহিদুজ্জামান ডায়মন্ড
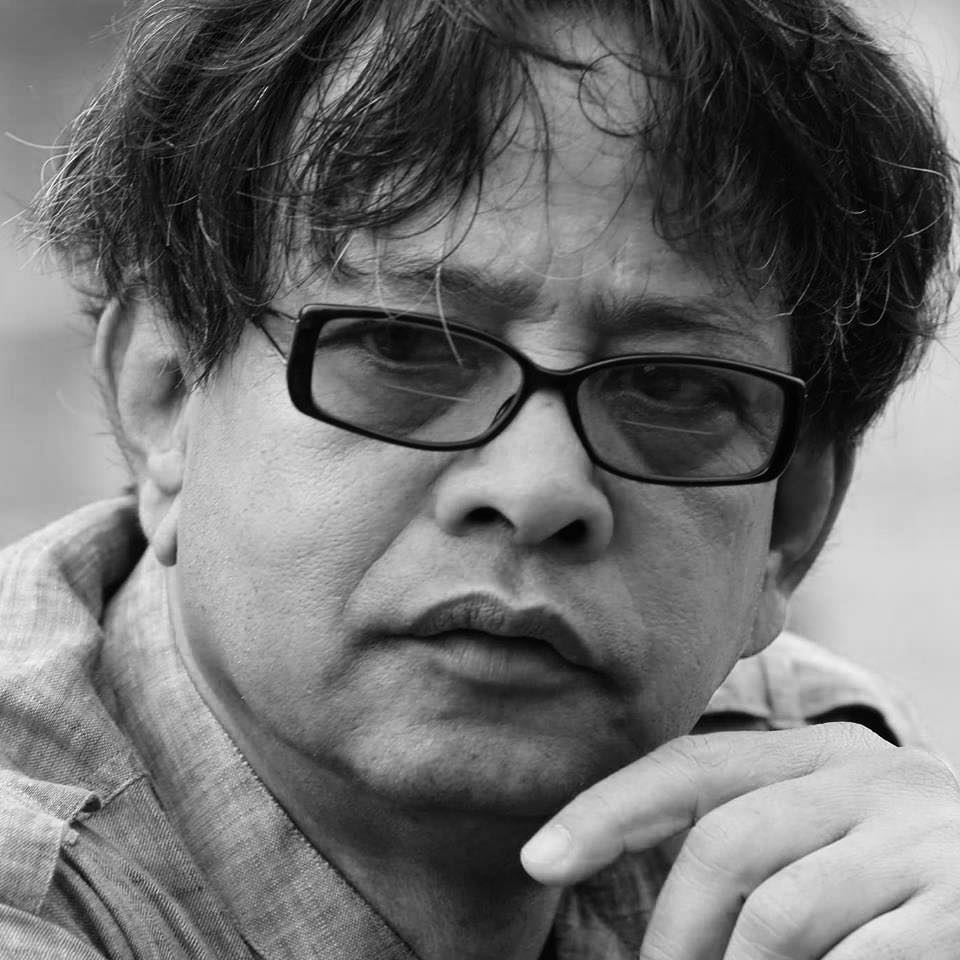
- Occupations: Filmmaker, writer, producer
- Years active: 1996–present
- Children: Syeda Wahida Sabrina

Syed Wahiduzzaman Diamond is a Bangladeshi filmmaker. He won Bangladesh National Film Award for Best Director for his direction of the film Gangajatra (2009).

== Career ==
In 2006, Diamond directed a film Nacholer Rani, based on the life of the peasant activist Ila Mitra. He directed Gangajatra in 2009 which won National Film Awards in eight categories and Bachsas Awards in seven categories.

== Awards ==
- Atandra Padak (2010)
- Bangladesh National Film Award for Best Director (2009)

== Works ==
- Nacholer Rani (2006)
- Gangajatra (2009)
- Antordhan (2013)
- Shesh Kotha (2017)
- COVID-19 in Bangladesh
- Rohingya (2022)
