= Badrul Anam Saud =

Bangladeshi film director and scriptwriter

- বদরুল আনাম সৌদ
- Born: 1975 or 1976 (age 49–50)
- Occupation: Actor
- Spouses: Suborna Mustafa (m. 2008)

Badrul Anam Saud is a Bangladeshi film director and scriptwriter. He won Bangladesh National Film Award for Best Director and Best Dialogue for the film Gohin Baluchor (2017).

== Personal life ==
Saud is married to actress-politician Suborna Mustafa.

== Criticism ==
During the July Revolution, Saud took stand with the government led by the Awami League. During which, he along with other pro government artists, including Ferdous Ahmed and his wife Suborna Mustafa, initiated a WhatsApp group titled Alo Ashbei (lit. 'There will be light').

On the aftermath of the uprising, On 3 September 2024, some screenshots of messages related to that group circulated on social media. And on November, Bangladesh Police barred Saud and his wife from leaving the country.

== Works ==
=== Films ===
- Khondo Golpo 1971 (2011)
- Gohin Baluchor (2017)
- Rupsha Nodir Banke (2020)
- Shyama Kabya (2024)

=== Television ===
- Doll's House (2007)
- Tomay Hrid Majhare Rakhbo (2017)
- Akkhor Theke Uthe Asha Manush (2018)
- Lukochuri Lukochuri Golpo (2019)
