= Kazi Krishnokoli Islam =

Bangladeshi singer

Krishnokoli
- Born: Khulna, Bangladesh
- Instrument: Vocal
- Website: www.krishnokoli.com

Kazi Krishnokoli Islam is a Bangladeshi singer and lyricist. She won Bangladesh National Film Award for Best Female Playback Singer for the film Monpura (2009).

== Career ==
Krishnokoli was born and raised in Khulna. She got music lessons from her mother Meherun Nesa, Shadhon Ghosh and Basudeb Biswas. She was enrolled in Chhayanaut in 1998.

Krishnokoli released her debut album "Shurjey Bandhi Basha" in 2007. In 2011, her second album "Alor Pithey Andhar" was released.

Krishnokoli is involved with "Biplabi Nari Shanghati", a women's rights organization. She worked for an audio/visual company before working with the production house, Krishnochura, as a creative director between 2005 and 2006. Krishnokoli performs onstage with Arko Sumon on guitar.
