= 27th Bachsas Awards =

Bangladeshi film awards ceremony in 2006

- Awarded for: outstanding performers of the silver screen, small screen, music, dance and theatre in 2005
- Awarded by: Bangladesh Cholochitra Sangbadik Samity (Bangladesh Cine-Journalists' Association)
- Presented by: Bangladesh Cholochitra Sangbadik Samity (Bangladesh Cine-Journalists' Association)
- Announced on: 2006
- Presented on: September 16, 2006
- Site: Bangladesh China Friendship Centre, Dhaka, Bangladesh

Highlights
- Best Actor: Ilias Kanchan
- Best Actress: Moushumi

The 27th Bachsas Awards were given by the Bangladesh Cholochitra Sangbadik Samity (Bangladesh Cine-Journalists' Association) to outstanding performers of the silver screen, small screen, music, dance, and theatre in 2005. The awards were introduced in 1972 to encourage the fledgling film industry of the country.

== List of winners ==
=== Lifetime Achievement Awards ===
- Film - Amjad Hossain
- Music - Runa Laila

=== Film ===
Name of Awards	Winner(s)	Film
Best Actor	Ilias Kanchan	
Best Actress	Moushumi	
Best Female Playback Singer	Anupoma Mukti	Hajar Bachhor Dhore
Best Cinematography	Mahfuzur Rahman Khan	Hajar Bachhor Dhore

=== Drama serial ===
Name of Awards	Winner(s)	Drama Serial
Best Actor	Zahid Hasan	
Best Actress	Bijori Barkatullah	

=== Television program ===
- Best Talk Show (Educational) - Tritiyo Matra
