= Shahadat Hossain (actor) =

Bangladeshi actor and radio personality

Md. Shahadat Hossain
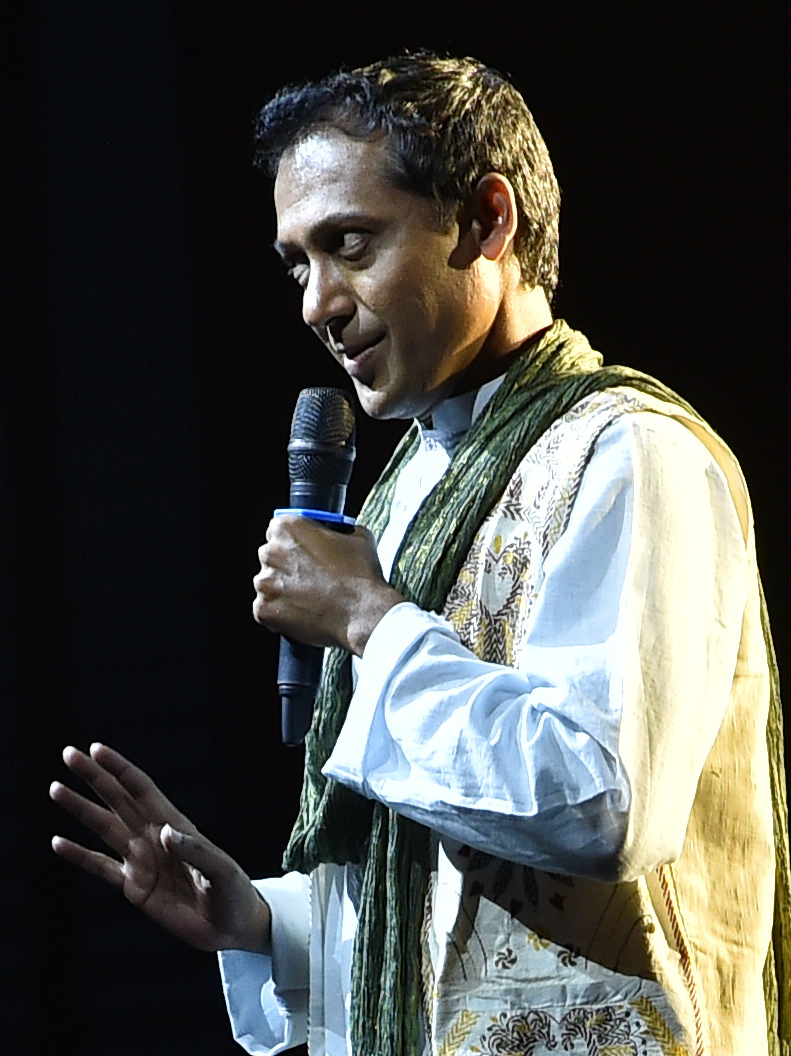
- Hossain presenting a cultural program in 2021
- Born: 9 November 1976 (age 49); Barisal, Bangladesh
- Occupations: Actor, radio personality

Md. Shahadat Hossain (born 9 November 1976) is a Bangladeshi actor and radio personality who acted in stage, television and films. He won National Film Award 2017 in Best Supporting Actor category for Gohin Baluchor.

== Early life and education ==
Hossain was born on 9 November 1976 in Barisal. He passed SSC and HSC from Khulna. He completed his graduation in political science. He also completed MBA major in Human Resource Management.

== Career ==
Hossain acted in stage during his school life. He joined Center for Asian Theatre in 1997. His made his debut in television drama in 2005. He played the role of Bahadur in Sisimpur. He won Lux RTV Star Awards 2016 in the Best Actor in Single Episode Drama and Telefilm category.

Hossain also acted in films. Under Construction is his debut film. Sutopar Thikana is his first released film. Sutopar Thikana was released on in 2015. His film Under Construction was released 2016. His film Ekattorer Nishan was also released in 2016.

Hossain's film Nuru Mia O Tar Beauty Driver was released in 2017. His film Gohin Baluchor was also released in 2017. He won National Film Award 2017 in Best Supporting Actor category for this film. He worked in a short film titled Performer in 2019.

Besides films Hossain worked in Navana Group more than one years. He joined there in 2001. He also worked as a radio jockey in ABC Radio. He worked there in Behal Chourasta.

== Personal life ==
Hossain married to Farzana Rahman Rita in 2007.

== Selected stage dramas ==
- Velua Sundori
- Peer Gynt
- Raja
- The Lady from the Sea
- Eksho Bosta Chal
- The Communicator
- Dog, Women, Man
- Ontorale Itihas
- Stalin

== Selected television dramas and telefilms ==
- Sisimpur
- Swapnavukh
- Mithya Tumi Dosh Pipra
- Sobuj Nokhkhotro
- Kopthe Mon
- Jodi Nirbashan Daw
- Jononi
- Akjon Bikkhato Bektir Mrittur Por
- Pinjor
- Sonali Megher Valobasa
- Kingkortobyo Bimukh
- Ghorar Chal Arai Ghor
- Ebong
- Shunyata
- Mon Tar Shangkhini
- Amaro Porano Jaha Chay
- Pagla Ghonta
- Premer Satkahon
- Ekti Dotola Barir Golpo
- Rakhkhusi
- Pochattorer Diary
- Ba te Bandhu(Season 1)
- Ba te Bandhur Hutoputi(Season 2)
- Dena Pawna

== Filmography ==
Year	Film	Role	Notes
2015	Sutopar Thikana	Sutopa's husband	First released film
2016	Under Construction		First film
2016	Ekattoter Nishan		
2017	Nuru Miya O Tar Beauty Driver		
2017	Gohin Baluchor	Mizan	
2019	Performer		Short film

| 2021 | Dhaka Dream

== Awards and nominations ==
Year	Award	Category	Work	Result
2016	Lux RTV Star Awards	Best Actor in the Single Episode Drama and Telefilm	Mon Tar Shongkhini	Won
2017	National Film Award	Best Supporting Actor	Gohin Baluchor	Won
