= Shahidul Islam Khokon =

Bangladeshi filmmaker and producer

- শহীদুল ইসলাম খোকন
- Born: 15 May 1957; Barisal District, East Pakistan, Pakistan
- Died: 4 April 2016 (aged 58); Uttara, Dhaka, Bangladesh
- Occupation: Filmmaker

Shahidul Islam Khokon (15 May 1957 – 4 April 2016) was a Bangladeshi filmmaker and producer.

== Career ==
Khokon debuted as a director on 1985 through his film Rokter Bondi. He directed more than 30 films and most of them were commercially successful.

== Works ==
- Rokter Bondi (1985)
- Chandana Daku (1986)
- Loraku (1986)
- Podmo Gokhra (1987)
- Bir Purush (1988)
- Bojro Mushthi (1989)
- Uddhar (1989)
- Biplob (1990)
- Akarma (1990)
- Sontrash (1991)
- Bishdat (1991)
- Din Mojur (1991)
- Top Rongbaj (1991)
- Utthan Patan (1992)
- Shotru Bhoyongkor (1992)
- Shotorko Shoytan (1993)
- Opohoron (1993)
- Duhshahosh (1994)
- Ghatak (1994)
- Commander (1994)
- Bishwapremik (1995)
- Grihojuddha (1996)
- Rakkhos (1996)
- Lompot (1996)
- Palabi Kothae (1997)
- Charidike Shotru (1997)
- Narapisach (1997)
- Vondo (1998)
- Madam Fuli (1999)
- Pagla Ghonta (1999)
- Joddha (2000)
- Bheja Biral (2001)
- Mukhoshdhari (2002)
- Chai Khomota (2003)
- Laal Sobuj (2005)
- Taka (2005)
- Bangla (2006)
- Swapnopuron (2008)
- Chehara: Vondo 2 (2010)
- Bhalobasha Saint Martine (2012)
