= Humayun Faridi =

Bangladeshi actor (1952–2012)

- হুমায়ুন ফরীদি
- Humayun Faridi
- Born: Humayun Kamrul Islam; 29 May 1952; Dacca, East Bengal, Pakistan
- Died: 13 February 2012 (aged 59); Dhaka, Bangladesh
- Education: Jahangirnagar University (BA)
- Occupation: Actor
- Years active: 1969 – 2012
- Spouses: Nazmun Ara Begum Minu (m. 1980; div. 1984); Suborna Mustafa (m. 1984; div. 2008)
- Children: 1

Humayun Kamrul Islam, better known as Humayun Faridi (Bengali: হুমায়ুন ফরীদি, romanized: Humayon Foridi; 29 May 1952 – 13 February 2012) was a Bangladeshi actor. He worked in television dramas, movies and theatre plays. He won the Bangladesh National Film Award for Best Actor for his lead role in the film Matritto (2004). He was awarded Ekushey Padak posthumously in 2018 by the Government of Bangladesh.

== Early life and education ==
Faridi was born in Narinda, Dhaka, on 29 May 1952, to ATM Nurul Islam and Begum Farida Islam. He was the second among five siblings. Pinu was one of his sisters. In 1968, he passed the SSC exam from Islamia Government High School, and in 1970, he passed the HSC from Chandpur Government College. In the same year, he entered the University of Dhaka to study organic chemistry. However, due to the Bangladesh Liberation War of 1971, it became impossible to continue his studies, and he subsequently took part as a freedom fighter in the war. Later he was admitted to Jahangirnagar University to study economics and became a close associate of dramatist Selim Al-Deen.

== Career ==
Faridi was discovered by dramatist Nasiruddin Yousuff, who went to serve as a judge at Jahangirnagar University, where a play written, directed and acted by Faridi was staged. Faridi was one of the principal organizers of the 1976 Drama Festival of Jahangirnagar University. He joined as a member of the Dhaka Theatre. In 1978, he debuted his theater acting career in the Shakuntala rendition by Selim Al-Deen, playing the character Tokkhok. After that, he performed in Phoni Monsha in 1980, Kirtankhola as Chaya Ranjan in 1981, and Keramat Mangal as Keramat in 1985. Faridi's last theatre acting was in the mid-1990s in a play called Bhut.

Faridi debuted in the television dramas through his performance in Nil Nakshar Shandaney in 1982. He went on to act in Bhangorer Shobdo Shuni, Songsoptok (1987–88), Pathar Shomoy (1989), Dui Bhai (1990), Shiter Pakhi (1991), Kothao Keu Nei (1992–93), Shomudrey Gangchil (1993), Kachher Manush, and Doll's House (2007–08).

Faridi debuted his film acting career in the film Din-Mojur directed by Shahidul Islam Khokon. He appeared with Shakib Khan in his third film Ajker Dapot in 1999. He went on to act in Shantrash, Top Rongbaz and Bish Daat.

== Personal life ==
In 1980, Faridi married Nazmun Ara Begum Minu. They had one daughter – Shararat Islam Devjani. The couple got divorced after four years. He was then married to the actress Suborna Mustafa until 18 March 2008.

== Death ==
Faridi died on 13 February 2012 at his residence. He was suffering from chronic lung disease.

== Works ==
=== Film ===
- Onek Diner Asha (1964)
- Alo Amar Alo (1971)
- Dahan (1985) - Munir
- Suchona (1988) - Akkel Ali
- Shontrash (1991) - Julmot Ali Khan
- Top Rangbaaz (1991)
- Utthan Poton (1992)
- Beporoa (1992)
- Sotorko Shoitan (1993)
- Banglar Bodhu (1993) - Abul
- Ekattorer Jishu (1993) - Desmond, the caretaker
- Anutopto (1993)
- Dola
- Stree Hotta (1993)
- Duhshahosh (1994)
- Sneho (1994) - Thanda Mama
- Ghatok (1994) - Razakar Jamir Box
- Ghrina (1994) - BC Lohani
- Commander (1994) - Andu Chora / A.R. Khan
- Ghorer Shotru (1994)
- Konnadaan (1995) - Salamatullah
- Bishaw Premik (1995) - Romeo / Boro vai
- Anjuman (1995)
- Bichar Hobe (1996) - Dobir Morol
- Baghini Konna (1996)
- Soitan Manush (1996)
- Mayer Odhikar (1996)
- Nirmom (1996) - Rustam Ali
- Palabi Kothai (1997) - Mr. Howladar, Manager
- Coolie (1997) - Keramat Ali Bepari
- Shudhu Tumi (1997) - Amir Chakladar
- Anondo Asru (1997) - Dewan Sharif
- Praner Cheye Priyo (1997) - Billat Ali
- Ranga Bou (1998)
- Vondo (1998) - The Great Prince
- Shanto Keno Mastan (1998)
- Ke Amar Baba (1999)
- Madam Fuli (1999) - Karam Ali
- Pagla Ghonta (1999)
- Ranga Bou (1999)
- Ashami Bodhu (1999)
- Mone Pore Tomake (2000) - Mr. Cotton Ali
- Joddha (2000) - Shuk Narayan / Bablu
- Kukkhato Khuni (2000) - Ismail Sordar
- Bidroho Charidike (2000)
- Bichchu Bahini (2000) - Farid Chowdhury
- Bhoyongkor Sontrasi (2001)
- Eri Nam Bhalobasha (2002)
- Kokhono Megh Kokhono Brishti (2003)
- Bir Soinik (2003) - Ramjan Molla
- Bachelor (2004) - Abrar Bhai
- Tyag (2004) - Sidhu Bao
- Shyamol Chhaya (2004) - The Freedom Fighter Commander
- Joyjatra (2004) - Pocha
- Matritwa (2005) - Jabbar
- Taka (2005) - Arman Chowdhury
- Duratta (2006)
- Bangla (2006)
- Mayer Morjada (2006)
- Rupkothar Golpo (2006) - Drunk man in broken down car
- Bindur Chhele (2006) - Jadab
- Aha! (2007) - Kishlu
- His Dream, His Nightmare (2007) - Ajmol Hossain
- Ki Jadu Korila (2008) - Kamal Chairman
- Priotomeshu (2009) - Nishad's Brother-in-law
- Chehara: Vondo-2 (2010) - Prince
- Phirey Esho Behula (2011)
- Meherjaan (2011) - Khonkar
- Ek Cup Cha (2014) - Afzal Chowdhury
- Hulia
- Bachelor
- Teg
- Return Ticket
- Kokhono Megh Kokhono Brishti
- Takar Ohonkar
- Utthan-Poton
- Sottru Voyonkor
- Ajker Hitler
- Atto-Ohongkar
- Shukher Sorgoh
- Nil Sagorer Tire
- Shashon
- Sotru Voyonkor
- Lat Shaheb
- Kuli
- Hingsha
- A Desh Kar
- Mittar Mrityu
- Nor Pishach
- Bhalobashi Tomake
- Shukher Sorgoh
- Churmar
- Prem Mane Na Badha
- Nistur
- Bager Thaba
- Premer Jala
- Palabi Kuthai
- Kalo Choshma
- Paharadar

=== Television dramas ===
- Manik Chor
- Nil Nakshar Shandhany (1982)
- Durbin Die Dekhun (1982)
- Bhangoner Shabdo Shuni (1983)
- Bakulpur Koto Dur (1985)
- Dubhuboner Dui Bashinda
- Ekti Laal Shari
- Mohuar Mon (1986)
- Sat Ashmaner Shiri (1986)
- Ekdin Hothat (1986, TV Movie) - The Teacher
- Chanmiar Negative Positive (1986)
- Manoshi Je Amar (1986)
- Poush Phagun-er Pala
- Karo Kono Neeti Nai
- Aloknogor
- Ojattra (1987)
- Songsoptok (1987–1988)
- Pathar Shomoy (1989)
- Osomoy (1989)
- Dui bhai (1990)
- Shiter Pakhi (1991)
- Kothao Keu Nei (1990)
- Shomudre Gangchil (1993)
- Tini Akjon (2005)
- Pret (2005)
- Chandragrasto (Director) (2006)
- Kacher Manush (2006)
- Mohona (2006)
- Vober Hat (2007)
- Tobuo Protikkha (Director)
- J Jibon Hoyni Japon (2007)
- Srinkhal (2010)
- Prioy Jon Nibash (2011)
- Arman Bhai The Gentle Man (2011)
- Rater Otithi67

=== Theatrical plays ===
- Montasir Fantasy
- Kirtonkhola
- Keramot Mongol
- Durto wee
