= Gangajatra =

- Movie poster
- গঙ্গাযাত্রা
- Directed by: Syed Wahiduzzaman Diamond
- Written by: Syed Wahiduzzaman Diamond
- Screenplay by: Syed Wahiduzzaman Diamond
- Produced by: Impress Telefilm Limited
- Starring: Ferdous Ahmed; Sadika Parvin Popy; Shimla; Shahidul Islam Sacchu; Syeda Wahida Sabrina
- Cinematography: Hasan Ahmed
- Edited by: Shahidul Haque
- Music by: Emon Saha
- Distributed by: Impress Telefilm Limited
- Release date: November 28, 2009
- Running time: 105 minutes
- Country: Bangladesh
- Language: Bengali

Gangajatra (Bengali: গঙ্গাযাত্রা; also known in English as The Journey) is a Bangladeshi film written and directed by Syed Wahiduzzaman Diamond. This film was shown at "Kolkata International Film Festival" in 2010.

== Plot ==
Rupa's husband sells her and her daughter, Nipa, into slavery in a brothel. Longing for her former life, Rupa develops feelings for one of her clients, Ratan (Sacchu), but he ultimately disappoints her. Meanwhile, the brothel owner insists that Rupa serve clients in front of Nipa. Frustrated with her life, Rupa and Nipa commit suicide together. Prokash (Ferdous) and Sudhamoni (Popy) attempt to bury the bodies, but the local community stops them from doing so on government land. Prokash and Sudhamoni must now arrange a proper funeral.

== Cast ==
- Ferdous Ahmed - Prokash
- Sadika Parvin Popy - Sudhamoni
- Shimla - Rupa
- Shahidul Islam Sacchu - Ratan
- Syeda Wahida Sabrina - Nipa

== Soundtrack ==
The music of this film was directed by Emon Saha and lyrics were penned by Mohammad Hossain Jemmy and Syed Wahiduzzaman Diamond.

- Jeona Jeona Shyam - Kanak Chapa
- Uira Uira Jaay - Kanak Chapa

== Awards ==
This film won National Film Awards in eight categories and Bachsas Awards in seven categories

Award Title	Category	Awardee	Result
National Film Awards	Best Director	Syed Wahiduzzaman Diamond	Won
National Film Awards	Best Actor	Ferdous Ahmed	Won
National Film Awards	Best Actress	Sadika Parvin Popy	Won
National Film Awards	Best Child Artist	Syeda Wahida Sabrina	Won
National Film Awards	Best Story	Syed Wahiduzzaman Diamond	Won
National Film Awards	Best Art Director	Mohammad Kalantor	Won
National Film Awards	Best Costume Design	Dilip Singh	Won
National Film Awards	Best Makeup	Khalilur Rahman	Won
Bachsas Awards	Best Actor	Ferdous Ahmed	Won
Bachsas Awards	Best Actress	Sadika Parvin Popy	Won
Bachsas Awards	Best Supporting Actor	Shahidul Islma Sacchu	Won
Bachsas Awards	Best Supporting Actress	Shimla	Won
Bachsas Awards	Best Music Director	Emon Saha	Won
Bachsas Awards	Best Female Playback Singer	Kanak Chapa	Won
Bachsas Awards	Best Art Director	Mohammad Kalantor	Won
