= Bachsas Awards =

Bangladeshi film industry awards

- Current: 40th Bachsas Awards
- Awarded for: outstanding performers of the silver screen, small screen, music, dance and theatre
- Sponsored by: Bangladesh Cine-Journalists' Association
- Location: Dhaka, Bangladesh
- Country: Bangladesh
- Presented by: Bangladesh Cine-Journalists' Association
- First award: 1972
- Final award: 2018

The Bachsas Awards were introduced in 1972 to encourage the fledgling film industry of Bangladesh. Bangladesh Cholochitra Sangbadik Samity (Bangladesh Cine-Journalists' Association) gave its most prestigious awards to outstanding performers in film, television, music, dance and theatre.

== History ==
These were the first Bangladeshi awards introduced after liberation war. The motto of the award was "Creative films with social commitment" and the symbol was the Royal Bengal Tiger. The first award was given for the films of 1972 and 1973. The categories of the awards were Best film (production), direction, story, screenplay, dialogue, leading and supporting actor, leading and supporting actress, music direction, male and female playback singers, camera work, editing and sound recording. Documentary films of special importance, and initiating new or alternative trends were also awarded. The awards were given regularly up to 1988. After a break of seven years, the awards were reintroduced in 1995.

== Juries and rules ==
The juries are appointed by the Bachsas' elected committee. The board members are from different walks of the society such as social worker, government officer, educationist, journalist, film maker, film producer, actor or poet.

== Awards ==
The awards include: Ascension

=== Lifetime Achievement Awards ===
- Film
- Music
- Literature
- Gangstar

=== Honorary Awards ===
- Aziz Misir Critic Award
- S M Parvez Memorial Award
- Fazlul Haque Memorial Award
- Ahmed Zaman Chowdhury Memorial Award
- Belaal Ahmed Memorial Award

=== Film ===
- Best film
- Best direction
- Best actor
- best actress
- Best supporting actor
- Best supporting actress
- Best music
- Best lyrics
- Best Male Playback Singer
- Best Female Playback Singer
- Best story
- best dialogue
- Best screenplay
- Best art-direction
- Best editing
- Best cameraman

=== Telefilm ===
- Best Telefilm
- Best direction
- Best actor
- best actress

=== Drama serial ===
- Best drama serial
- Best dramatist
- Best director
- Best cinematographer
- Best actor
- Best actress
- Best supporting actor
- Best supporting actress

=== Drama ===
- Best drama
- Best dramatist
- Best director
- Best cinematographer
- Best actor
- Best actress
- Best supporting actor
- Best supporting actress

=== Program ===
- Best anchor
- Best magazine show (Entertainment)
- Best information-based program

=== Theatre ===
- Best production
- Best playwright
- Best set-design
- Best theatre group
- Best actor
- Best actress

=== Music ===
- Best Male Singer
- Best Female Singer
- Best Band
- Best Male Vocal
- Best Female Vocal

== Awards by decade ==
- Bachsas Awards (1972–1980): 1972 (1st) →1974 (2nd) →1975 (3rd) →1976 (4th) →1977 (5th) →1978 (6th) →1979 (7th) → 1980 (8th)
- Bachsas Awards (1981–1990): →1981 (9th) → 1982 (10th) →1983 (11th) →1984 (12th) →1985 (13th) → 1986 (14th) → 1987 (15th) → 1988 (16th)
- Bachsas Awards (1991–2000): → 1995 (17th) → 1996 (18th) → 1997 (19th) → 1998 (20th) → 1999 (21st) → 2000 (22nd)
- Bachsas Awards (2001–2010): 2001 (23rd) → 2002 (24th) → 2003 (25th) → 2004 (26th) → 2005 (27th) → 2006 (28th) → 2007 (29th) → 2008 (30th) → 2009 (31st) → 2010 (32nd)
- Bachsas Awards (2011–2020): 2011 (33rd) → 2012 (34th) → 2013 (35th) → 2014 (36th) → 2015 (37th) → 2016 (38th) → 2017 (39th) → 2018 (40th)

== See also ==
- National Film Awards
- Meril Prothom Alo Awards
- Ifad Film Club Award
- Babisas Award
- Channel i Music Awards
