= Afzal Hossain =

Bangladeshi actor

- আফজাল হোসেন
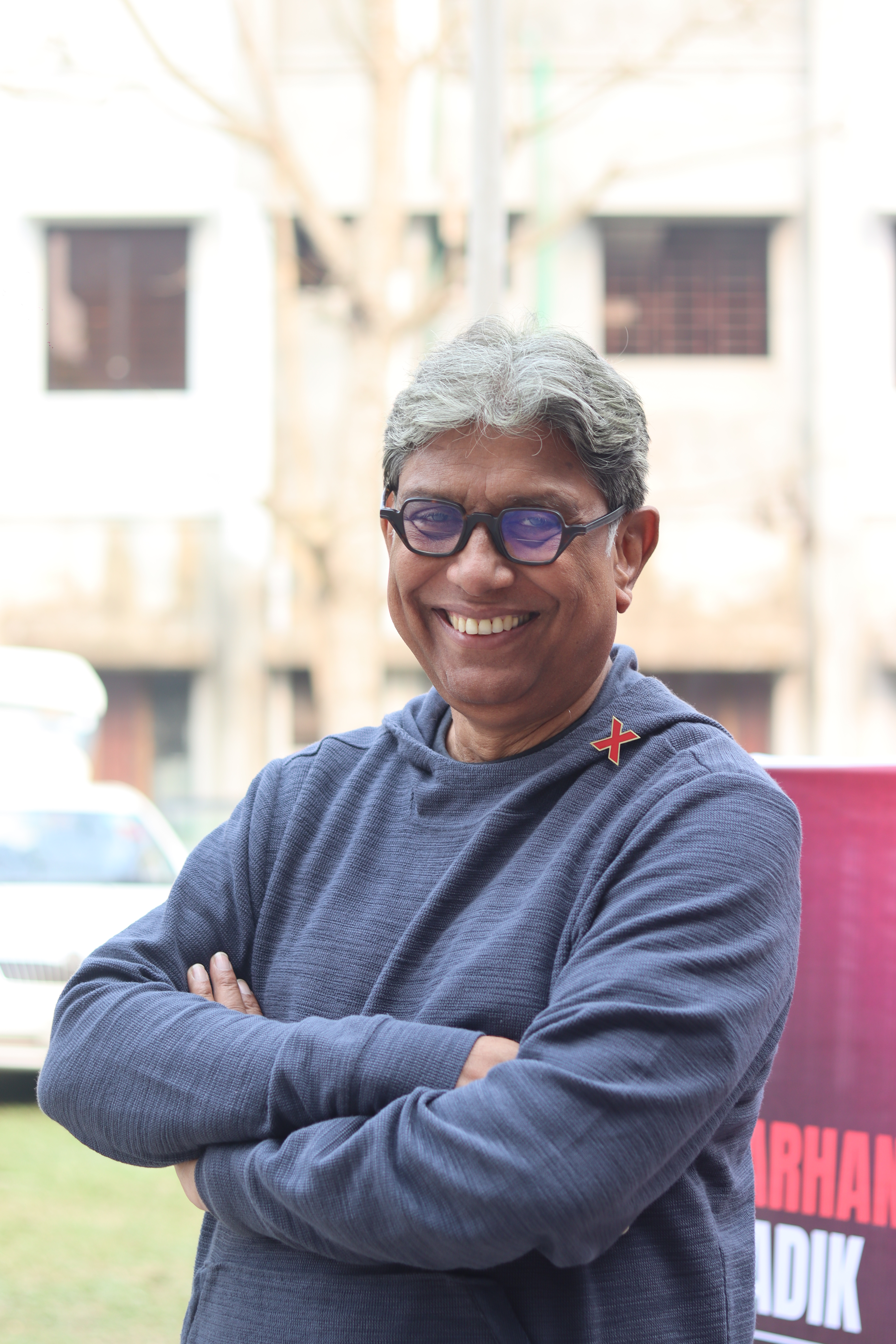
- Afzal Hossain at TEDx Bangladesh Agricultural University, in 2025
- Born: 19 July 1954 (age 72); Satkhira, East Bengal, Dominion of Pakistan
- Occupations: Actor, director, writer, painter, poet
- Years active: 1975-present
- Spouse: Tajin Halim Mona
- Father: Ali Ashraf Hossain
- Relatives: Alfaz Hossain (brother); Rumana Afroz (sister)

Afzal Hossain (born 19 July 1954) is a Bangladeshi actor, director, writer and painter. He was awarded the Ekushey Padak, the second most important award for civilians in Bangladesh, in 2022.

== Early life ==
Hossain was born in Parulia, Satkhira in erstwhile East Bengal. His father, Ali Ashraf Hossain, was a medical officer. He has a brother, Alfaz Hossain and a sister, Rumana Afroz.

== Career ==
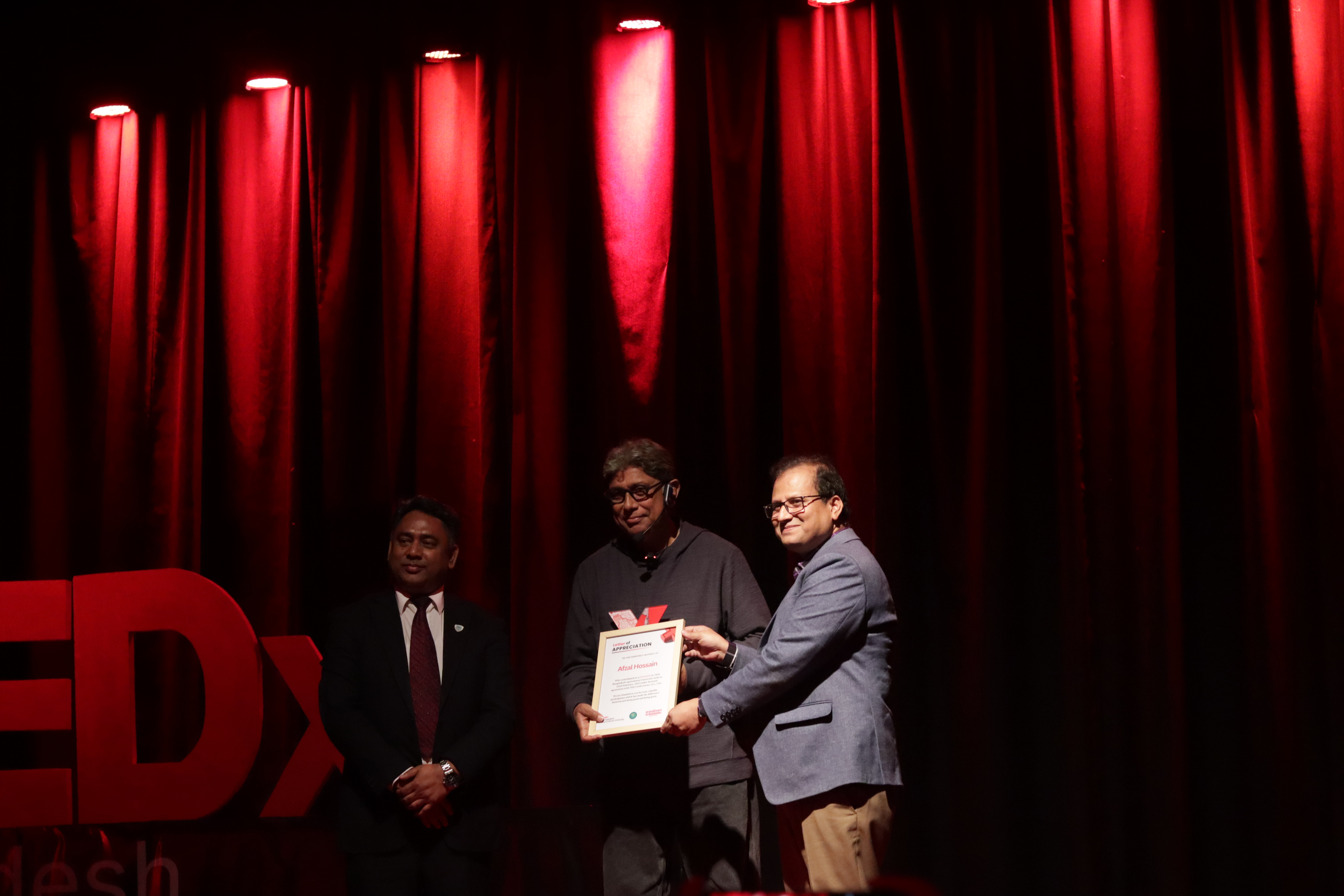
Afzal Hossain at TEDxBAU

Hossain started his acting career in theatrical productions in the mid-1970s. Later, he was enlisted as an actor of BTV and acted in dramas produced by BTV. He also starred in three movies including box office hit Dui Jibon, Notun Bou and Palabi Kothay. Since 1984, he became busy with making TVC and has contributed a lot in this sector to develop in today's level.

== Personal life ==
Hossain is married to Tazeen Halim Mona.

== Works ==
=== Television ===
Year	Title	Director/Scriptwriter	Co-stars	Notes
1988	Bohubrihi	Humayun Ahmed		BTV
	Chehara			
	Vokatta		Afsana Mimi	
	Hotath Brishti	Faria Hossen	Sadia Islam Mou	
1995	Shudhu Tomar Jonney		Suborna Mustafa	
	Mon Moyuri		Shomi Kaiser	
	Bhalobasha Tomar Amar		Rehnuma, Shampa Reza	
	Shukher Chharpotro		Lubna Ahmed	
	Tumi Ki Shei Tumi		Sadia Islam Mou, Shimul	
	Shudhu Ekbar Bolo		Tarana Halim	
	Parle Na Tumi		Shampa Reza	
	Niloy Na Jani		Suborna Mustafa	
	Montro Dilam Praner		Tania Ahmed	
	Sudhu Tomar Jonno		Suborna Mustafa	
	Aronner Sukh Dukkho		Suborna Mustafa	Drama Serial
	Shohochor		Sitima Enam	
	Shako		Shomi Kaiser	
	Hitongkor		Suborna Mustafa	
	Hridoy Theke Paoa			
2006	U-Turn		Tarin Ahmed	TV play
	Phuler Bagane Shap		Tarin Ahmed	
	Golpo Ti Sotto		Tarin Ahmed	
2012	Prem Bachite Jane	Arif Khan	Suborna Mustafa, Mou	Aired on NTV
2012	RashidKarimerBibahoBishayakJatilata	Badrul Anam Soud		Aired on Channel 9
2012	Gabbu O Professor Rifat	Morshedul Islam		Aired on Eid
2013	Coxbazarer Kakatua	Faridur Reza Sagar	Orsha, Simanto	Serial, aired on Channel i
2014	Golpoti Shotti	Noim Imtiaz Neyamul	Tarin Ahmed	Aired on SA TV
2014	Late Korey Sylhet-e	Afzal Hossain	Naziba Basher, Orsha, Probal	Serial, aired on Channel i
2015	Raag Kore Rangamati	Faridur Reza Sagar		Serial, aired on Channel i
2015	Din Dupure Dinajpur	Faridur Reza Sagar	Orsha, Shimanto, Probal	Serial, aired on Channel i
2015	Kobita Sundor	Bipasha Hayat	Mahfuz Ahmed, Bipasha Hayat	Aired on Channel i
	Hingsha		Sadia Islam Mou, Nobel	
	Shunnota		Sadia Islam Mou	
	Shororitu	Israfil Rafat	Mehazabien Chowdhury	
	Sedino Bikel Chilo		Sumaiya Shimu	
	Harano Patay Prem		Tarin Ahmed	
2012	Bipashar Otithi		Bipasha Hayat	Bangla Vision

=== Films ===
Year	Title	Roles	Director	Notes
1983	Notun Bou			
1988	Dui Jibon			
1997	Palabi Kothay			
2017	Dhaka Attack			
2025	Taandob	Monayem Chowdhury	Raihan Rafi	

=== Web series ===
Year	Title	Platform	Notes
2021	Ladies & Gentleman	ZEE5	
2022	Pett Kata Shaw	Chorki	Episode: "Misti Kisu''
2022	Refugee	Hoichoi	
2022	Karagar	Hoichoi	
2022	Bodh	Hoichoi	
2025	Dui Shaw	Chorki	Episode: Antara
