= Suborna Mustafa =

Bangladeshi actress and politician

- সুবর্ণা মুস্তাফা
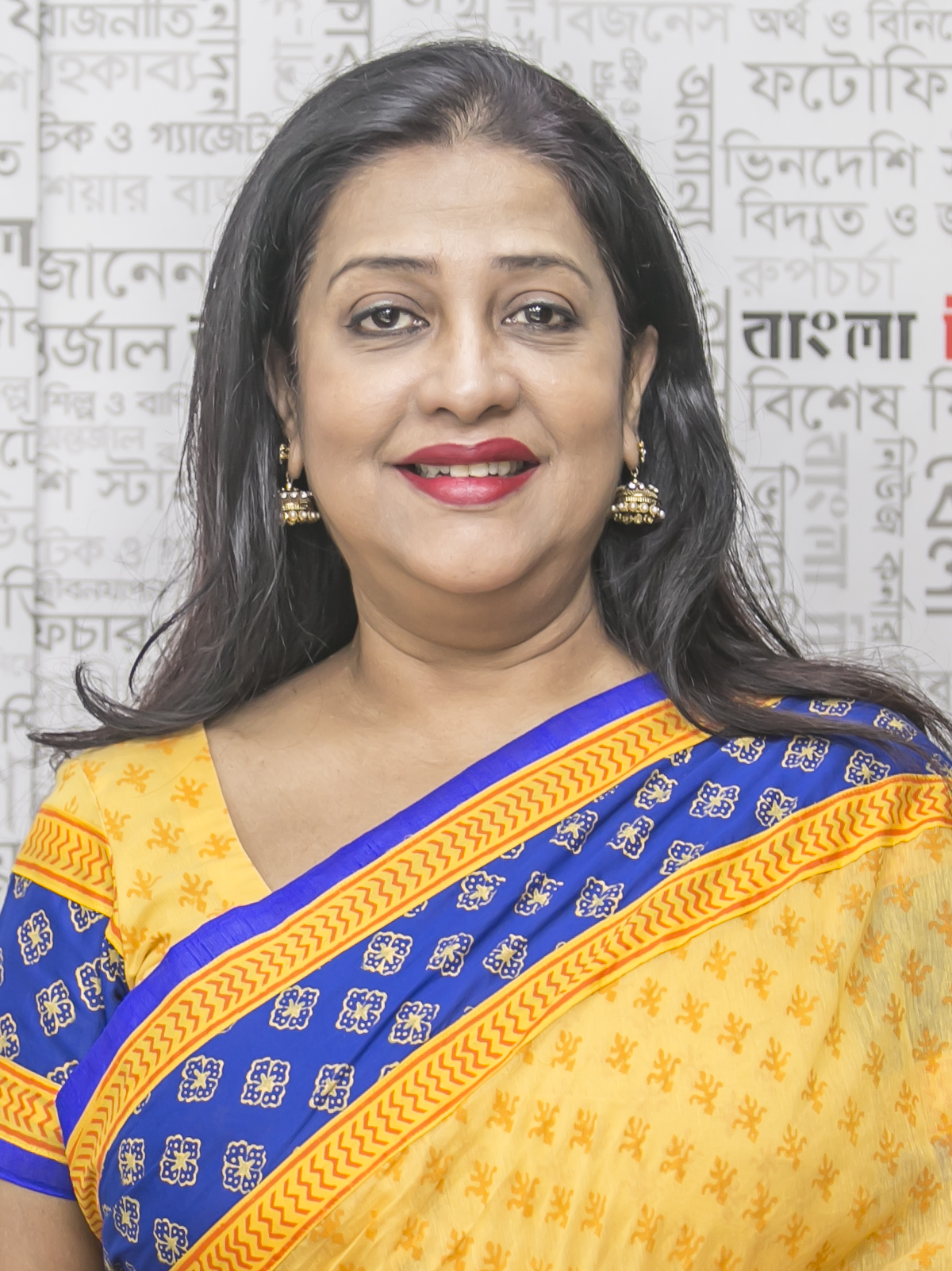
- Mustafa in 2017
- Born: 2 December 1959 (age 66); Dhaka, East Pakistan, Pakistan
- Education: MA (English)
- Alma mater: University of Dhaka
- Occupation: Actress
- Years active: 1978–present
- Political party: Bangladesh Awami League
- Spouses: Humayun Faridi (m. 1984; div. 2008); Badrul Anam Saud (m. 2008)
- Father: Golam Mustafa

Member of Bangladesh Parliament
- In office 20 February 2019 – 6 August 2024
- Succeeded by: Nasima Zaman (Boby)
- Constituency: Reserved Women's Seat-4

Suborna Mustafa (Bengali: সুবর্ণা মুস্তাফা; born 2 December 1959) is a Bangladeshi television, film and stage actress. She is a former Jatiya Sangsad member representing the Reserved Women's Seat-4 from 2019 to 2024. She is a member of the Bangladesh Awami League party.

Mustafa is notable for her roles in television drama serials including Kothao Keu Nei (1990), Aaj Robibar (1999) and Ayomoy (1991). She won Bangladesh National Film Award for Best Supporting Actress twice for her performance in the films Notun Bou (1983) and Gohin Baluchor (2017). She was awarded Ekushey Padak in culture category by the Government of Bangladesh in 2019.

== Early life and education ==
Mustafa was born on 2 December 1959 in Dopdopiya Union, Nalchity Upazila, Jhalokati District. Her parents were Golam Mustafa, a film and television actor, and Husne Ara Mustafa, a radio producer of All India Radio, Radio Pakistan and Bangladesh Betar. She has a sister, Camelia Mustafa. Mustafa mostly spent her time at her maternal grandparents' house on Elephant Road in Dhaka and studied in Viqarunnisa Noon School.

== Career ==
Mustafa debuted in acting in the television drama Baraf Gala Nadi, based on a novel by Zahir Raihan. She acted in the drama Rokte Angur Lata with Afzal Hossain. She also acted in first ever package drama serial of Bangladesh Television, Shilpi, directed by Mamunur Rashid.

Her roles include appearing as one of the main characters in Dolls House (2007–2009), a Bengali-language drama-serial which first aired on the television channel ATN Bangla.

Mustafa made her stage acting debut through Jaundice O Bibidho Balloon by Al Mansur. She debuted in directing through a single-episode play, Akash Kushum for ATN Bangla in 2009.

Mustafa made her film debut in Ghuddi (1980). In 1984, she acted in Noyoner Alo, along with Zafar Iqbal. She later acted in Lal Shobujer Pala, Palabi Kothay, Suruj Miah, Opohoron, Durotto, Headmaster, Commander, Khondo Golpo 71, Ankhi O Tar Bondhura and Shonkhonil Karagar.

A long-time cricket fan, Mustafa has been a commentator on the sport for Radio Bhumi since 2015. As a member of the Censor Board, she participates in the National Film Awards selection.

During the July Revolution, Mustafa took stand with the government led by the Awami League. During which, she along with other pro government artists, including Ferdous Ahmed, initiated a WhatsApp group titled Alo Ashbei (lit. 'There will be light').

On the aftermath of the uprising, On 3 September 2024, some screenshots of messages related to that group circulated on social media. And on November, Bangladesh Police barred Mustafa and her husband from leaving the country.

In April 2025, an attempted-murder case was filed against Mustafa and sixteen other artists over the death of a protester in Vatara during the first stage of the revolution.

== Works ==
=== Television drama plays ===
- Kothao Keu Nei (1990)
- Aaj Robibar (1999)
- Ayomoy
- Orntojatra
- Kacher Manush (2006)
- Okkhor Theke Uthe Asha Manush (2018)
- Kana Sirajuddoula O Komol Bibir Otithishala
- Gohine
- Utshob

=== Films ===
- Ghuddi (1980)
- Laal Shobujer Pala (1981)
- Notun Bou (1983)
- Noyoner Alo (1984)
- Shuruj Miah (1985)
- Shonkhonil Karagar (1992)
- Rakkhosh
- Ajker Hitler
- Commander
- Palabi Kothay
- Apaharan
- Stree
- Durotto (2006)
- Gohin Baluchor (2017)
- Shimanto
- Manobjamin
- Uposhonghar
- Maya'r Por Maya
- Icche Puroner Birombona
- Megher Pore Megh
- Amar Bela Je Jaye
- Golok Dhadha

=== Web series ===
- Beauty and the Bullet (2019)

== Personal life ==
In 1984, Mustafa married Humayun Faridi, another Bangladeshi actor. They were divorced on 18 March 2008. Later she married Badrul Anam Saud, co-director of Dolls House, in July 2008. She is one of the famous actress in Bangladesh.
