= List of Bangladeshi films of 2025 =

This is a list of Bangladeshi films released in 2025.

== Box office collection ==
The top ten highest-grossing Bangladeshi films released in 2025, by worldwide box office gross revenue, are as follows.

Highest-grossing films of 2025
Rank	Title	Production company / distributor	Worldwide gross	Ref
1	Borbaad	Real Energy Entertainment, Ridhi Sidhi Entertainment	৳75 crore (US$6.1 million)	
2	Taandob	Alpha-i, SVF and Chorki	৳30 crore (US$2.4 million)	
3	Daagi	SVF, Alpha-i and Chorki	৳16 crore (US$1.3 million)	
4	Utshob	Dope Productions	৳13 crore (US$1.1 million)	
5	Jongli	MIB Studio	৳10.22 crore (US$830,000)	(Note: According to Prothom Alo, Jongli earned approximately ৳4.05 crore from multiplex ticket sales. However, this figure does not account for single-screen theatres, international markets, or corporate show revenues.)

== January – March ==
Opening		Title	Director	Cast	Production company	Ref.
J A N	03	Moddhobitto	Tanvir Hasan	Masum Aziz; Omar Malik; Elina Shammi; Shishir Sardar	Cine Media	
J A N	10	Makeup	Anonno Mamun	Tariq Anam Khan; Ziaul Roshan; Nipa Ahmed Really; Kazi Ujjal	Celebrity Production	
J A N	17	Kishor Gang	Abdul Mannan	Nilima Islam Moon, Ayan Sajib, Istiyak Ahmed Saad	Ruprong Films	
J A N	24	Rickshaw Girl	Amitabh Reza Chowdhury	Novera Ahmed, Allen Shubro, Nasir Uddin Khan, Champa	Half Step Down, Sleeperwave Films	
F E B	7	Boli - The Wrestler	Iqbal Hossain Chowdhury	Nasir Uddin Khan; Priyam Archi; AKM Itmam; Angel Noor	Applebox Films	
F E B	7	DayMukti	Badiul Alam Khokon	Symon Sadik; Sushmi Rahman; Samia Mahi; Abul Hayat; Dilara Zaman	Raisa Film Production	
F E B	16	Jole Jwole Tara	Arun Chowdhury	Rafiath Rashid Mithila, FS Nayeem, Fazlur Rahman Babu, Monira Mithu	Ononno Shrishti Production	
F E B	16	Mayna	Monjurul Islam Megh	Raj Ripa, Amaan Reza, Kayes Arju, Affan Mitul	Jaaz Multimedia	
M A R	31	Borbaad	Mehedi Hasan Hridoy	Shakib Khan, Jisshu Sengupta, Idhika Paul, Misha Sawdagor, Shahiduzzaman Selim, Mamunur Rashid, Fazlur Rahman Babu, Intekhab Dinar	Real Energy Entertainment, Ridhi Sidhi Entertainment	
M A R	31	Jongli	M. Raahim	Siam Ahmed, Shobnom Bubly, Prarthana Fardin Dighi, Shahiduzzaman Selim, Rashed Mamun Apu	MIB Studio	
M A R	31	Daagi	Shihab Shaheen	Afran Nisho, Tama Mirza, Sunerah Binte Kamal, Rashed Mamun Apu, Gazi Rakayet, Shahiduzzaman Selim	Alpha-i, Chorki SVF	
M A R	31	Chokkor 302	Sharaf Ahmed Zibon	Mosharraf Karim, Tareen Jahan, Moushumi Nag, Intekhab Dinar, Rawnak Hasan	Karkhana Production	
M A R	31	Jinn 3	Kamruzzaman Roman	Nusraat Faria, Shajal Noor	Jaaz Multimedia	
M A R	31	Antaratma	Wajed Ali Sumon	Shakib Khan, Darshana Banik, Shahed Sharif Khan, Jhuna Chowdhury, Aruna Biswas	Taranga Entertainment	

== April – June ==
Opening		Title	Director	Cast	Production company	Ref.
M A Y	16	Jaya Ar Sharmin	Piplu R Khan	Jaya Ahsan, Mohsina, Tanjim Saiyara Totini	Applebox Films	
M A Y	23	Antonagor	Golam Rabbani Kishor	Shanto Chowdhury, Toma, Subrata, Sohel Khan	Tonni Kothachitra	
J U N	7	Taandob	Raihan Rafi	Shakib Khan, Sabila Nur, Jaya Ahsan	SVF, Alpha-i & Chorki	
J U N	7	Insaaf - Tale of Legends	Sanjoy Somadder	Mosharraf Karim, Sariful Razz and Tasnia Farin	Titas Kothachitro	
J U N	7	NeelChokro	Mithu Khan	Arifin Shuvoo, Mandira Chokroborty	Film Fios Production	
J U N	7	Esha Murder: Karmaphal	Sunny Sanwar	Azmeri Haque Badhon, Misha Sawdagor, Sushama Sarker	Cop Creation	
J U N	7	Utshob	Tanim Noor	Zahid Hasan, Jaya Ahsan, Chanchal Chowdhury, Intekhab Dinar, Sadia Ayman	Chorki, Dope Productions	
J U N	7	Tagar	Aalok Hasan	Ador Azad, Puja Cherry Roy, Rosey Siddiqui	AR Movie Network	

== July – September ==
Opening		Title	Director	Cast	Production company	Ref.
J U L	11	Anyadin...	Kamar Ahmad Simon	Unnamed actor and actress, they are not professional actors and actresses	Beginning Production	
J U L	18	Ali	Biplob Hayder	Irfan Sajjad; Misha Sawdagor	Tori Multimedia	
A U G	1	Uraal	Jobaidur Rahman	Mahfuz Munna, Sohel Tawfiq, Shanto Chandra Sutradhar, Kabyakotha, KM Abdur Razzak, Kobori Dash, Roshan Sharif and Mir Sarowar Ali Mukul	Zatraparty and Joker (production house) Tiger Media (distributor)	
A U G	8	Jol Rong	Kabirul Islam Rana	Symon Sadik, Ushnow Haque, Kayes Arju, Shahiduzzaman Selim, Elina Shammi	Impress Telefilm, Bangladesh Government	
S E P	5	Amar Shesh Kotha	Kazi Mohammad Islam Mia	Kazi Hayat, Joy Chowdhury, Zara Taira, Rina Khan	MS Shocheton Film Media	
S E P	5	Dot	Barua Sunanda Kakon	Barua Manjit Dhiman, Misthi Moni, Pori	Tory Media Ltd.	
S E P	12	Nandini	Shoibur Rahman Russell	Indraneil Sengupta, Nazira Mou, Fazlur Rahman Babu	Nayontara Ltd.	
S E P	19	A House Named Shahana	Leesa Gazi	Aanon Siddiqua, Lutfur Rahman George, Iresh Zaker	Goopy Bagha Production Limited & Komola Collective	
S E P	19	Fereshteh	Morteza Atashzamzam & Mumit Al Rashid	Jaya Ahsan, Suman Faruk, Shahiduzzaman Selim	Image Films and Maximum Enterprise	
S E P	26	Saba	Maksud Hossain	Mehazabien Chowdhury, Mostafa Monwar, Rokeya Prachy	Verite Pictures Ltd.	
S E P	26	Shopne Dekha Rajkonna	Mostafizur Rahman Manik	Ador Azad, Nishat Nawar Salwa, Moushumi Akter Mithila	M.S Enterprise	
S E P	26	Udyoman Surjo	SM Shafiul Azam	Sadman Sameer, Kanta Noor, Shishir Ahmed	Linet Films	

== October – December ==
Opening		Title	Director	Cast	Production company	Ref.
O C T	3	Bandhob	Sujon Borua	Sumit Sengupta, Mou Khan, Gazi Rakayet	Anupam Kathachitra	
O C T	3	Bachelor in Trip	Nasim Sahnic	Shajal Noor, Shirin Shila, Kayes Arju	Ammajan Films	
O C T	10	Ondhokare Alo	Anwar Siraji	Rakib Shikder, Muskan Islam, Tithi Chowdhury	Akash Jamin Production	
O C T	17	Direct Attack	Sadek Siddique	Amin Khan, Popy, Emon, Shirin Shila	Ananda Bazar Multimedia	
O C T	17	Saat Bhai Champa: Adi	Ripon Nag	Amit Sinha, Ador Azad, Keya Payel, Dilruba Doyel	Impress Telefilm	
O C T	24	Konna	Mohammad Rafiqul Islam Khan	Ira Shikder, Rashed Murshed, Kazi Hayat	Khan Films International	
O C T	31	Behula Dorodi	Sabuj Khan	Fazlur Rahman Babu, Pran Roy, Suchona Sikder	Utshob Originals	
N O V	7	Mon Je Bojhena	Ayesha Siddiqua	Arifin Shuvoo, Tama Mirza	Impress Telefilm	
N O V	7	Silence: A Musical Journey	Emon Saha	Symon Sadik, Neelanjona Neela, Intekhab Dinar	Moonland Production	
N O V	14	Goar	Rakibul Alam Rakib	Rasel Mia, Falguni Rahman Jolly, Misha Sawdagor	Joyjatra Multimedia	
N O V	14	Delupi	Mohammad Touqir Islam	Chiranjit Biswas, Aditi Roy, Md Jakir Hossain	Footprint Film Production	
D E C	12	Khilari	MD. Shofullah	Zara Zaman, Shahen Shah, Nana Shah, Eva Rahman	ZZ Films	

== See also ==
- List of Bangladeshi films of 2024
- List of Bangladeshi films of 2026
