= List of highest-grossing Bangladeshi films =

This is a ranking of the highest-grossing Bangladeshi films screened at cinemas in Bangladesh and globally. Films generate income from several revenue streams, including box office sales (admissions), theatrical exhibition, television broadcast rights, and music album sales. There is no official tracking of sales and online sources publishing data are frequently unreliable.

== Highest-grossing films ==
This is a partial and confirmed list of highest-grossing Bangladeshi films listed as per worldwide net figures at the time of their release.

† Background shading indicates films playing in the week commencing 13 November 2026 in theaters around the world.

Highest-grossing films
Rank	Title	Year	Worldwide gross	Ref
1	Borbaad	2025	৳75 crore	
2	Toofan	2024	৳56 crore	
3	Priyotoma	2023	৳44 crore	
4	Taandob	2025	৳30 crore	
5	Rajkumar	2024	৳26 crore	
6	Beder Meye Josna	1989	৳25 crore	(Note: Attributed to multiple sources:)
7	Ammajan	1999	৳20 crore	
8	Bonolota Express	2026	৳20 crore	
9	Shopner Thikana	1995	৳19 crore	
10	Hawa	2022	৳16 crore	
11	Daagi	2025	৳16 crore	
12	Chandni	1991	৳15 crore	
13	Priya Amar Priya	2008	৳15 crore	
14	Surongo	2023	৳15 crore	
15	Utshob	2025	৳13 crore	
16	Poran	2022	৳12 crore	
17	Sotter Mrittu Nei	1996	৳11.5 crore	
18	Password	2019	৳11 crore	
19	Shanto Keno Mastan	1998	৳10.5 crore	
20	Boss 2: Back to Rule	2017	৳10.5 crore	
21	Jongli	2025	৳10.03 crore	(Note: According to Prothom Alo, Jongli earned approximately ৳4.05 crore from multiplex ticket sales. However, this figure does not account for single-screen theatres, international markets, or corporate show revenues. As reported by the Bangla Movie Database (BMDB), the distribution company The Abhi Katachitra stated that the film grossed a total of ৳10.03 crore, including income from multiplexes, single screens, overseas screenings, and corporate shows. BMDB is widely recognized as a reliable and frequently cited database for Bangladeshi cinema, offering cross-referenced and production-backed box office data, and is used by film analysts, journalists, and academic publications within the region.)
22	Dhaka Attack	2017	৳9.5 crore	
23	Leader: Amie Bangladesh	2023	৳9.5 crore	
24	Nabab	2017	৳9.1 crore	
25	Dard	2024	৳8.55 crore	
26	Keyamat Theke Keyamat	1993	৳8.2 crore	
27	Monpura	2009	৳8 crore	
28	Coolie	1997	৳7 crore	
29	Swami Keno Asami	1997	৳7 crore	
30	Badsha – The Don	2016	৳6.4 crore	
31	Debi	2018	৳6 crore	
32	Prince: Once Upon a Time in Dhaka	2026	৳5.7 crore	
33	Shikari	2016	৳5.55 crore	
34	Aynabaji	2016	৳5.13 crore	
35	Abdullah	1997	৳5 crore	
36	Khairun Sundari	2004	৳5 crore	
37	Koti Takar Kabin	2006	৳5 crore	
38	Chachchu	2006	৳5 crore	
39	Moner Majhe Tumi	2003	৳4.5 crore	
40	Ashikkhito	1978	৳4 crore	
41	Chhutir Ghonta	1980	৳4 crore	
42	Domm	2026	৳4 crore	
43	Agnee 2	2015	৳3.9 crore	
44	Kukkhato Khuni	2000	৳3.5 crore	
45	Agnee	2014	৳3.5 crore	
46	Hero: The Superstar	2014	৳3.5 crore	
47	Rockstar	2026	৳3.1 crore	
48	Matir Ghar	1979	৳3 crore	
49	Shot Bhai	1985	৳3 crore	
50	Shami Streer Juddho	2002	৳3 crore	

== Highest-grossing films by year of release ==
This is the list of highest-grossing Bangladeshi films by year of release. These films are listed as per their worldwide gross figures at time of release. These figures are not adjusted for ticket prices inflation.

† Background shading indicates films playing in the week commencing 13 November 2026 in theaters around the world.

Year	Title	Director	Producer	Worldwide gross	Ref.
1929	Sukumari	Ambuj Prasanna Gupta	Dhaka East Bengal Cinematograph Society		
1931	The Last Kiss	Ambuj Prasanna Gupta	Dhaka East Bengal Cinematograph Society		
1956	Mukh O Mukhosh	Abdul Jabbar Khan	Iqbal Films	Rs. 48,000 (equivalent to Rs. 240,000 or ৳110,000 in 2021)	
1959	Matir Pahar	Mohiuddin Ahmad	Eastern Theatres		
1960	Asiya	Fateh Lohani	Purbani Chitro		
1961	Harano Din	Mustafizul Haq	Ehtesham		
1962	Chanda	Ehtesham	Dossani Films; Leo Films		
1963	Talash	Mustafizul Haq	Dossani Films; Leo Films		
1964	Sangam	Zahir Raihan	Iftekharul Alam Kislu		
1965	Rupban	Salahuddin	Salahuddin Productions	Rs. 20 lakh (equivalent to Rs. 1.0 crore or ৳4.5 million in 2021)	
1966	Behula	Zahir Raihan	Star Cine Corporation		
1967	Nawab Sirajuddaula	Khan Ataur Rahman	Seven Arts		
1968	Sat Bhai Chompa	Dilip Shom	Mizanur Rahman Bulet		
1969	Moina Moti	Kazi Zahir	Chitra Films		
1970	Jibon Theke Neya	Zahir Raihan	Cine Workshop		
1971	Nacher Putul	Ashok Ghosh	Rana Films		
1972	Ora Egaro Jon	Chashi Nazrul Islam	Parvez Films	৳40 lakh (US$519,480)	
1973	Titash Ekti Nadir Naam	Ritwik Ghatak	Habibur Rahman Khan	৳1.23 lakh (US$15,668)	
1974	Sangram	Chashi Nazrul Islam	Anupam Kothachitra		
1975	Badshah	Akbar Kabir Pintu	Salma Kothachitra		
1976	The Rain	S.M. Shafi	S.M. Shafi		
1977	Simana Periye	Alamgir Kabir	Alamgir Pictures Ltd.		
1978	Ashikkhito	Azizur Rahman	Swaralipi Banichitra	৳4 crore (US$2.6 million)	
1979	Matir Ghar	Azizur Rahman	SS Productions	৳3 crore (US$1.9 million)	
1980	Chhutir Ghonta	Azizur Rahman	Swaralipi Banichitra	৳4 crore (US$2.4 million)	
1981	Lal Shobujer Pala	Syed Hasan Imam	Chitrangan Studio		
1982	Love in Singapore	Azizur Rahman Buli	Ashok Ghosh		
1983	Johnny	Dewan Nazrul	Jambs Movie Private Limited		
1984	Mahanayak	Alamgir Kabir	Bulbul Ahmed		
1985	Shot Bhai	Abdur Razzak	Rajlokkhi Productions	৳3 crore (equivalent to ৳32 crore or US$2.6 million in 2024)	
1987	Desh Bidesh	Azizur Rahman Buli	Rehan Khan; Iftekhar Ahmed		
1988	Neetiban	Shibli Sadik	Disha International		
1989	Beder Meye Josna	Tojammel Haque Bakul	Anandamela Cinema Limited	৳25 crore (equivalent to ৳216 crore or US$18 million in 2024)	
1990	Shonkho Mala	Tojammel Haque Bokul	Tojammel Haque Bokul		
1991	Chandni	Ehtesham	Ajanta Kothachitro	৳15 crore (equivalent to ৳115 crore or US$9.3 million in 2024)	
1992	Chakor	Montazur Rahman Akbar	Shonamoni Films	৳2 crore (equivalent to ৳15 crore or US$1.2 million in 2024)	
1993	Keyamat Theke Keyamat	Sohanur Rahman Sohan	Anandamela Cinema Limited	৳8.2 crore (equivalent to ৳59 crore or US$4.8 million in 2024)	
1994	Kaliya	Dewan Nazrul	Jambs Movie Private Limited		
1995	Shopner Thikana	M.A. Khaleq	Atlas Movies	৳19 crore (equivalent to ৳117 crore or US$9.5 million in 2024)	
1996	Sotter Mrittu Nei	Chotku Ahmed	Anupam	৳11.5 crore (equivalent to ৳69 crore or US$5.6 million in 2024)	
1997	Coolie	Montazur Rahman Akbar	Flamingo Movies	৳7 crore (equivalent to ৳40 crore or US$3.3 million in 2024)	
1998	Shanto Keno Mastan	Montazur Rahman Akbar	Arman Production	৳10.5 crore (equivalent to ৳55 crore or US$4.5 million in 2024)	
1999	Ammajan	Kazi Hayat	Omi Bani Kothachitra	৳20 crore (equivalent to ৳99 crore or US$8.1 million in 2024)	
2000	Kukkhato Khuni	Montazur Rahman Akbar	Panorama Movies	৳3.5 crore (equivalent to ৳17 crore or US$1.4 million in 2024)	
2001	Sultan	F.I. Manik	Kamal Muhammad Kibria		
2002	Shami Streer Juddho	F.I. Manik	Kritanjali Cholochitro	৳3 crore (equivalent to ৳14 crore or US$1.1 million in 2024)	
2003	Moner Majhe Tumi	Matiur Rahman	Anandamela Cinema Limited	৳4.5 crore (equivalent to ৳20 crore or US$1.6 million in 2024)	
2004	Khairun Sundari	A.K. Shohel	Meghalaya Studio	৳5 crore (equivalent to ৳20 crore or US$1.7 million in 2024)	
2005	Molla Barir Bou	Salahuddin Lavlu	Chhayachhanda Chalachitra		
2006	Koti Takar Kabin	F.I. Manik	Ami Boni Kothachitra	৳5 crore (equivalent to ৳18 crore or US$1.4 million in 2024)	
2007	Amar Praner Swami	P.A. Kajol	Raithi Tokiz		
2008	Priya Amar Priya	Badiul Alam Khokon	Asha Production	৳15 crore (equivalent to ৳45 crore or US$3.7 million in 2024)	
2009	Monpura	Giasuddin Selim	Masranga Productions	৳8 crore (equivalent to ৳23 crore or US$1.8 million in 2024)	
2010	Number One Shakib Khan	Badiul Alam Khokon	Liberty Kathachitro	৳3 crore (equivalent to ৳7.9 crore or US$640,000 in 2024)	
2011	Guerrilla	Nasiruddin Yousuff	Impress Telefilm		
2012	Khodar Pore Ma	Shahin Sumon	Heartbeat Production		
2013	Purno Doirgho Prem Kahini	Shafi Uddin Shafi	Friends Movies International		
2014	Agnee	Iftakar Chowdhury	Jaaz Multimedia	৳3.5 crore (equivalent to ৳6.7 crore or US$550,000 in 2024)	
2015	Agnee 2	Iftakar Chowdhury	Jaaz Multimedia	৳3.9 crore (equivalent to ৳7.1 crore or US$580,000 in 2024)	
2016	Badsha – The Don	Baba Yadav	Eskay Movies; Jaaz Multimedia	৳6.4 crore (equivalent to ৳11 crore or US$900,000 in 2024)	
2017	Boss 2: Back to Rule	Baba Yadav	Jeetz Filmworks; Jaaz Multimedia	₹10.5 crore (equivalent to ₹16 crore or ৳210 million in 2026)	
2018	Debi	Anam Biswas	C for Cinema	৳6 crore (equivalent to ৳9.2 crore or US$750,000 in 2024)	
2019	Password	Malek Afsari	SK Films	৳11 crore (equivalent to ৳16 crore or US$1.3 million in 2024)	
2020	Bir	Kazi Hayat	SK Films		
2021	Chironjeeb Mujib	Nazrul Islam	Haider Enterprise		
2022	Hawa	Mejbaur Rahman Sumon	Anjan Chowdhury Pintu	৳16 crore (equivalent to ৳19 crore or US$1.6 million in 2024)	
2023	Priyotoma	Himel Ashraf	Versatile Media	৳44 crore (equivalent to ৳49 crore or US$4.0 million in 2024)	(Note: Attributed to multiple sources:)
2024	Toofan	Raihan Rafi	Alpha-i Studios Limited	৳56 crore (US$4.6 million)	
2025	Borbaad	Mehedi Hassan Hridoy	Real Energy Production	৳75 crore (US$6.1 million)	
2026	Bonolota Express	Tanim Noor	Buriganga Talkies; Hoichoi Studios	৳20 crore (US$1.6 million)	

== Highest opening weeks ==
Background shading indicates films playing in the week commencing 13 November 2026 in theaters around the world.

Rank	Year	Title	Director	Studio(s)	1st Week Collection	Ref.
1	2025	Borbaad	Mehedi Hassan Hridoy	Real Energy Production	৳27.43 crore (US$2.2 million)	(Note: Attributed to multiple sources:)
2	2024	Toofan	Raihan Rafi	Alpha-i Studios Limited	৳20 crore (US$1.6 million)	
3	2019	Password	Malek Afsari	Bengal Multimedia	৳11 crore (equivalent to ৳16 crore or US$1.3 million in 2024)	
4	2023	Priyotoma	Himel Ashraf	Versatile Media and SK Films	৳10.3 crore (equivalent to ৳11 crore or US$930,000 in 2024)	
5	2017	Dhaka Attack	Dipankar Dipon	Three Wheelers Ltd. and Splash Multimedia	৳7.5 crore (equivalent to ৳12 crore or US$990,000 in 2024)	
6	2015	Agnee 2	Iftakar Chowdhury	Jaaz Multimedia and Eskay Movies	৳3.9 crore (equivalent to ৳7.1 crore or US$580,000 in 2024)	
7	2023	Surongo	Raihan Rafi	Alpha-i and Chorki	৳2.5 crore (equivalent to ৳2.8 crore or US$230,000 in 2024)	
8	2022	Damal	Raihan Rafi	Impress Telefilm	৳2 crore (equivalent to ৳2.4 crore or US$200,000 in 2024)	
9	2016	Shikari	Joydip Mukherjee and Zakir Hossain Simanto	Jaaz Multimedia and Eskay Movies	৳1.5 crore (equivalent to ৳2.6 crore or US$210,000 in 2024)	
10	2018	Poramon 2	Raihan Rafi	Jaaz Multimedia	৳1 crore (equivalent to ৳1.5 crore or US$130,000 in 2024)	

== Highest-grossing films in international ==
This is a list of the Highest-grossing Bangladeshi films in foreign nations or outside of Bangladesh. The Box office information are from Box Office Mojo, The Numbers or a reliable news cite.

Highest-grossing Bangladeshi films in international
Rank	Year	Title	Director(s)	International Gross		Ref.
Rank	Year	Title	Director(s)	USD Gross	USD Gross (Inflated)	Ref.
1	2026	Bonolota Express	Tanim Noor	US$450,376	US$450376	
2	2022	Hawa	Mejbaur Rahman Sumon	US$358,000	US$393865	
3	2022	Poran	Raihan Rafi	US$189,000	US$207934	
4	2025	Utshob	Tanim Noor	US$177,000	US$177000	
5	2024	Toofan	Raihan Rafi	US$150,000	US$153946	
6	2023	Priyotoma	Himel Ashraf	US$132,000	US$139482	
7	2018	Debi	Anam Biswas	US$125,414	US$160798	
8	2025	Borbaad	Mehedi Hassan Hridoy	US$99,000	US$99000	
9	2023	Surongo	Raihan Rafi	US$90,000	US$95102	
10	2025	Jongli	M. Raahim	US$81,000	US$81000	
11	2017	Dhaka Attack	Dipankar Dipon	US$74,000	US$97197	
12	2019	Made in Bangladesh	Rubaiyat Hossain	US$69,110	US$87028	
13	2025	Taandob	Raihan Rafi	US$53,000	US$53000	
14	2016	Aynabaji	Amitabh Reza Chowdhury	US$48,000	US$64393	
15	2002	Matir Moina	Tareque Masud	US$46,852	US$83866	
16	2023	Mujib: The Making of a Nation	Shyam Benegal	US$36,937	US$39031	
17	2025	Daagi	Shihab Shaheen	US$19,000	US$19000	
18	1976	The Rain	S. M. Shafi	US$14,500	US$82039	
19	2016	Ostitto	Anonno Mamun	US$8,100	US$10866	
20	2024	Rajkumar	Himel Ashraf	US$5,279	US$5418	

== Most expensive films ==
This is a list of the most expensive Bangladeshi films, with budgets given in Bangladeshi taka.

Rank	Year	Title	Director	Producer	Budget	Ref.
1	2023	MR-9: Do or Die	Asif Akbar	Avail Entertainment	৳83 crore (equivalent to ৳92 crore or US$7.5 million in 2024)	
1	2023	Mujib: The Making of a Nation	Shyam Benegal	BFDC; NFDC	৳83 crore (equivalent to ৳92 crore or US$7.5 million in 2024)	
2	2025	Borbaad	Mehedi Hasan Hridoy	Real Energy Entertainment; Ridhi Sidhi Entertainment	৳15 crore (US$1.2 million)	(Note: Borbaad's reported budget vary between ৳15–৳18 crore)
3	2026	Prince: Once Upon a Time in Dhaka	Abu Hayat Mahmud	Creative Land Films	৳12 crore (US$980,000)	
4	2023	Dard	Anonno Mamun	Action Cut Entertainment; Kibria Films; Eskay Movies; One World Movies	৳10 crore (equivalent to ৳11 crore or US$900,000 in 2024)	
5	2024	Rajkumar	Himel Ashraf	Versatile Media	৳8 crore (US$650,000)	
6	2017	Nabab	Joydip Mukherjee	Jaaz Multimedia; Eskay Movies	৳4.5 crore (equivalent to ৳7.3 crore or US$600,000 in 2024)	
7	2025	Daagi	Shihab Shaheen	Alpha-i; Chorki; SVF	৳4.5 crore (US$370,000)	
8	2022	Din–The Day	Morteza Atashzamzam	Monsoon Films	৳4 crore (equivalent to ৳4.9 crore or US$400,000 in 2024)	
9	2026	Bonolota Express	Tanim Noor	Buriganga Talkies; Hoichoi	৳4 crore (US$330,000)	
10	2018	Captain Khan	Wajed Ali Sumon	Shapla Media	৳3.5 crore (equivalent to ৳5.4 crore or US$440,000 in 2024)	

== Highest-grossing franchises or film series ==
This is a list of the highest-grossing Bangladeshi film series or franchises.

Rank	Series	Director(s)	No. of films	Highest-grossing film	Highest gross	Total series gross	Ref.
1	Agnee	Iftakar Chowdhury	2	Agnee 2 (2015)	৳3.9 crore (equivalent to ৳7.1 crore or US$580,000 in 2024)	৳7.4 crore (equivalent to ৳13 crore or US$1.1 million in 2024)	
2	Golapi	Amjad Hossain	3	Golapi Ekhon Traine (1978)	৳1 crore (US$665,779)		
3	Purno Doirgho Prem Kahini	Shafi Uddin Shafi	2	Purno Doirgho Prem Kahini (2013)			

== See also ==
- Cinema of Bangladesh
- List of Bangladeshi films
- List of Bangladeshi film series
- Independent films of Bangladesh
- Bangladesh National Film Award for Best Film
- List of Bangladeshi submissions for the Academy Award for Best Foreign Language Film
