= Domm (film) =

- Theatrical release poster
- Bengali: দম
- Literally: Breath
- Directed by: Redoan Rony
- Written by: Syed Ahmed Shawki; Al-Amin Hasan Nirjhar; Md. Saifullah Riyad; Robiul Alam Robi
- Produced by: Redoan Rony; Shahriar Shakil; Mahendra Soni
- Starring: Afran Nisho; Puja Cherry; Chanchal Chowdhury
- Cinematography: Mikhail Siryanov
- Music by: Arafat Mohsin Nidhi; Parsha Mahjabeen Purnee
- Production companies: SVF Entertainment; Alpha-I Studios; Chorki
- Release date: 21 March 2026 (Bangladesh)
- Running time: 128 Minutes
- Country: Bangladesh
- Language: Bengali
- Budget: ৳6 crore (US$490,000)
- Box office: ৳7 crore (US$570,000)

Domm (Bengali: দম, romanized: Dôm, lit. 'Breath'; subtitled as Until The Last Breath) is a 2026 Bangladeshi survival thriller film directed by Redoan Rony. The film is based on true events. The story focuses on the resilience and mental strength of an ordinary person. The film stars Afran Nisho, Puja Cherry and Chanchal Chowdhury in the lead roles. The film is produced by Shahriar Shakil, Mahendra Soni and Redoan Rony under the banner of SVF Entertainment, Alpha-I Studios and Chorki.

It marks the first collaboration between Afran Nisho and Chanchal Chowdhury, as well as between Nisho and Puja Cherry. The film also signifies the return of director Redoan Rony following his previous work Ice Cream (2016). The screenplay was written by Syed Ahmed Shawki, Al-Amin Hassan Nirjhar, Md. Saifullah Riyad, and Robiul Alam Robi, while the film's music was composed by Arafat Mohsin Nidhi.

Domm was released on 21 March 2026, coinciding with Eid-ul-Fitr. Upon release, the film received highly positive reviews from both critics and audiences but became a box office disappointment. Currently, it stands as the 3rd highest grossing Bangladeshi film of 2026

== Cast ==
- Afran Nisho as Shahjahan Islam Noor
- Puja Cherry as Zohra Parveen Rani, Noor's wife
- Chanchal Chowdhury as Sujit
- Dolly Johur as Noor's mother
- Abul Hayat as Millad
- Ruslan Sabirli as Ezaz Khan
- Zahid Hasan (special appearance)

== Production ==
=== Development ===
The film was officially announced on 9 December 2023, along with a poster unveiling. Chorki, Alpha-I Studios and SVF Entertainment announced the deal for the film and presented Domm (with the tagline 'Until the Last Breath) as the title, with Chanchal Chowdhury initially signed on.

=== Casting ===
Chanchal Chowdhury officially signed on to the film in December 2023. By July 2025, the script was completed and Afran Nisho was signed to star in the film—it was made clear that both Nisho and Chowdhury would star together. Puja Cherry officially joined the film at the Muhurat event at the Gulshan Shooting Club in Dhaka on 29 October 2025. In January 2026, Dolly Johur joined to play Nisho's mother. In February, it was revealed that Zahid Hasan would be playing a guest role.

=== Filming ===
In September 2025, the film's crew traveled to Kazakhstan for filming. On 6 December 2025, the first phase of filming in Kazakhstan was completed and the crew returned to Bangladesh. On 3 January 2026, the second phase of filming began in Pabna.

== Music ==
On March 2, the film's first song, "Ei Mon Tomake Dilam", was recorded in a studio in Dhaka, a remake of the song of the same title from the 1982 film Manasi. After a long 44 years, the song was sung again by Sabina Yasmin and re-sung by Momin Biswas, written by Gazi Mazharul Anwar, with some new lyrics written by Tanmoy Parvez and composed by Anwar Parvez and re-composed by Arafat Mohsin Nidhi.

The first song of the film, "Kothaay Pabo Tahare", was released on March 20. It was sung by Imran Mahmudul and Parasha Mehjabin Purnee. Purnee herself wrote and composed the song.

No.	Title	Lyrics	Music	Singer(s)	Length
1.	"Kothay Pabo Tahare"	Parsha Mahjabeen Purnee	Parsha Mahjabeen Purnee	Imran Mahmudul; Parsha Mahjabeen Purnee	03:01
2.	"Ei Mon Tomake Dilam"	Gazi Mazharul Anwar; Tonmoy Parvez	Anwar Parvez; Arafat Mohsin Nidhi	Sabina Yasmin; Momin Biswas	2:52
3.	"Prohor"	Redoan Rony	Emon Chowdhury	Nazmun Munira Nancy; Pintu Ghosh	02:57

== Theme and influence ==
Domm is based on the miraculous survival of Md. Noor Islam, who was kidnapped by the Taliban in Afghanistan in 2008. Md. Noor Islam worked at the BRAC. He was held captive by the Taliban for 84 days. The Taliban demanded a ransom of 3 million Afghanis and the release of his three companions. Once, they wanted to kill him by riding him on a donkey, but he started reciting the Du'a Yunus. After a while, the Taliban gave him the good news of his release.

== Release ==
Domm has been cleared without any cuts by the Bangladesh Film Certification Board. The board has given the film a U (Unrestricted) certificate. The film was released in 21st March 2026.

=== International release ===
The film was released in the United States on April 11, 2026. The film received positive reviews there as well. The film was released in Canada on April 17, 2026.

== Reception ==
=== Critical response ===
Pritha Parmita Nag of Prothom Alo, highlighted the Dhallywood film for its engaging narrative and strong directorial execution. The review praised the lead actors for their authentic performances and highlighted the technical craft, particularly the cinematography and background score, while noting minor pacing issues in certain sequences.

A critic of The News 24, was noted for receiving mixed to positive reactions, with praise directed at Nisho's performance and the film's strong dramatic elements alongside minor plot criticisms.

Syeda Farzana Zaman Rumpa of Dhaka Post praised the film, highlighting Afran Nisho's performance, strong characterization for both male and female leads, and effective use of music and background score. While commending performances by Pooja Chery, Chanchal Chowdhury, and Dolly Johur, the review noted minor drawbacks in repetitive dialogue and pacing, ultimately rating it a well-rounded cinematic package.

Sheikh Hafizur Rahman of Prothom Alo commended for its atmospheric direction, engaging character dynamics, and emotional depth, despite minor pacing flaws in the second half.

Masud Hasan Ujjal of Dhaka Post highlighted as a compelling narrative driven by strong emotional resonance and impactful performances, particularly praising Afran Nisho's lead role and Redoan Rony's realistic directorial approach to social themes.

=== Audience response ===
Bangladeshi entertainment media has highlighted Nisho and Chowdhury's first-time pairing as a major box-office success, citing Nisho's recent success in the films Surongo (2023) and Daagi (2025). The film has received mostly positive reviews since its release.

== Controversy ==
Since the release of the teaser of the film Domm, several scenes and settings have been found to be similar to the Malayalam-language Indian film The Goat Life (2024) and the film was considered a remake of it, but director Redoan Rony denied the matter and said that the film is based on a true story and an original story.

== Accolades ==
Award	Category	Recipient	Result	Ref.
Meril-Prothom Alo Awards	Best Film	Domm	Nominated	
Meril-Prothom Alo Awards	Best Film Actor	Afran Nisho	Nominated	
Meril-Prothom Alo Awards	Best Film Actress	Puja Cherry	Nominated	
Meril-Prothom Alo Awards	Best Singer (female)	Nazmun Munira Nancy	Nominated	
