= Alpha-i =

Bangladeshi content platform and production company

Alpha-i Studios Limited
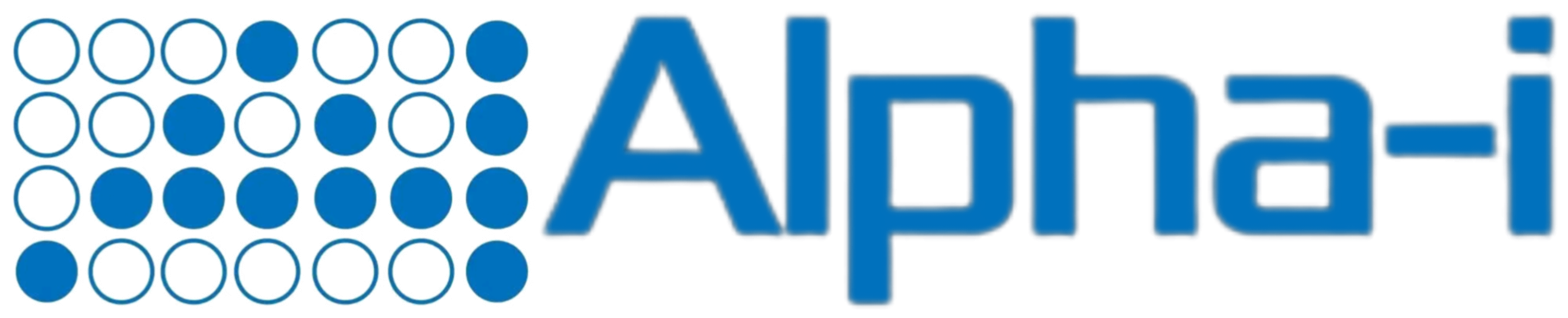
- Logo used since 2004; 22 years ago
- Type: Privately held company
- Founder: Shahriar Shakil
- Headquarters: Dhaka, Bangladesh
- Key people: Shahriar Shakil

Alpha-i Studios Ltd. is a Bangladeshi film production and distribution company, founded by Shahriar Shakil. Apart from producing and distributing Bengali films in Bangladesh, India (West Bengal) and other countries, it also distributes Hollywood films in Bangladesh. The other divisions of the company include exhibition, TV content production, digital cinema, new media and IPR syndication.

Alpha-i and Kolkata-based production company Shree Venkatesh Films have jointly established SVF Alpha-i Entertainment Limited in Bangladesh. The company's managing director is Shahriar Shakil, and its chairman is Mahendra Soni. It specializes in producing Bangladeshi films.

== Background ==
In 2023, the film production company jointly produced with Chorki the film Surongo (2023), directed by Raihan Rafi, which was a box office hit and earned a total of ৳15 crore (US$1.2 million). It then produced the film Peyarar Subash (2024), which received a positive response. The film production company co-produced with Chorki the film Toofan (2024), directed by Raihan Rafi, which broke several box office records for the Bangladeshi film industry. With an approximate gross of ৳56 crore, it is the second-highest grossing Bangladeshi film of all time, as well as the highest grossing Bangladeshi film of 2024. Globally, it is the most widely released Bangladeshi film of all time, having been released in nearly twenty countries, as well as the first Bangladeshi film to have grossed over ৳56 crore (US$4.6 million). It also jointly produced with Chorki and SVF the film Daagi (2025), directed by Shihab Shaheen, which was a box office hit and earned a total of ৳16 crore (US$1.3 million). The company jointly produced with Chorki and SVF the film Taandob (2025), directed by Raihan Rafi, which was a box office hit and earned a total of ৳30 crore (US$2.4 million).

== Filmography ==
=== Feature films ===
Year	Film	Director	Cast	Notes	Ref.
2023	Surongo	Raihan Rafi	Afran Nisho, Tama Mirza	Co-produced with Chorki	
2024	Peyarar Subash	Nurul Alam Atique	Jaya Ahsan, Ahmed Rubel, Tariq Anam Khan, Sushoma Sarkar	Co-produced with Chorki	
2024	Toofan	Raihan Rafi	Shakib Khan, Mimi Chakraborty, Chanchal Chowdhury, Masuma Rahman Nabila	Co-produced with SVF and Chorki	
2025	Daagi	Shihab Shaheen	Afran Nisho, Tama Mirza	Nominated– Meril-Prothom Alo Awards for Best Film; co-produced with SVF and Chorki	
2025	Taandob	Raihan Rafi	Shakib Khan, Jaya Ahsan, Afran Nisho, Sabila Nur, Siam Ahmed	Nominated– Meril-Prothom Alo Awards for Best Film; co-produced with SVF and Chorki (In Association with Deepto TV)	
2026	Domm: Until The Last Breath	Redoan Rony	Afran Nisho, Chanchal Chowdhury, Puja Cherry	Co-produced with SVF and Chorki	
2026	Surongo 2 †	Raihan Rafi	Afran Nisho	Post-production	
2026	Khal Nayak †	Vicky Zahed	Afran Nisho, Chanchal Chowdhury	Filming	
TBA	Pulsirat †	Vicky Zahed	Afran Nisho, Mehazabien Chowdhury	Co-produced with SVF	

=== Web films ===
Year	Film	Director	Cast	Notes	Ref.
2023	Unish20	Mizanur Rahman Aryan	Arifin Shuvoo, Afsana Ara Bindu	Released on Chorki	
2025	Ghumpori	Jahid Preetom	Pritom Hasan, Tanjin Tisha	Nominated– Meril-Prothom Alo Awards for Best Film; released on Chorki	
2025	Gerakol	Rakayet Rabby	Samira Khan Mahi, Intekhab Dinar, Abu Hurayra Tanvir	Released on Chorki	
2026	Tiffin Box	Rakayet Rabby	Prantar Dastider, Rukaiya Jahan Chamak	Released on Chorki	
2026	Faisha Gesi	Mahmudur Rahman Hime	Sabila Nur, Dibya Joyti	Co-produced with Chorki	

==== Web series ====
Year	Title	Director	Cast	Notes	Ref.
2025	AKA	Vicky Zahed	Afran Nisho, Masuma Rahman Nabila, Imtiaz Barshon, Tajzi Syeda, Jayanta Chattopadhyay	Released on Hoichoi	
