= Arafat Mohsin =

Bangladeshi music composer, singer, and film director

- Born: November 14, 1994 (age 31); Dhaka, Bangladesh
- Occupation: Music composer · music director · singer · film director
- Years active: 2009–present
- Spouse: Raba Khan (m. 2025)
- Relatives: Abdus Sobur (grandfather) · Shamsuzzaman Akhand (father) · Mahmuda Begum (mother)

Arafat Mohsin Nidhi (born 14 November 1994) is a Bangladeshi music composer, music director, singer, and filmmaker. Renowned for his orchestral and contemporary background scores in commercial Dhallywood films, Nidhi has contributed to Ice Cream (2016), Iti Tomar Ei Dhaka (2017), Damal (2022), Surongo (2023), Toofan (2024), Borbaad (2025 film), Daagi (2025), and Taandob (2025). His compositions often blend large-scale symphonic elements with electronic and traditional Bangladeshi sounds, drawing inspiration from composers like Hans Zimmer and A. R. Rahman, and have been credited with elevating the auditory landscape of Bangladeshi cinema.

Nidhi released his debut extended play (EP) Thako in 2019 and has composed title tracks for over 50 dramas and series, including All Time Dore Opor, YouTuber, Middle Class Sentiment, Bikel Belar Pakhi, Mainkar Chipay, Bodh, Koshtonir, Khachar Bhetor Ochin Pakhi, Black Money, and Amlanama. As a director, he helmed the Eid telefilm Jonakpoka (2011), the internationally selected short Everything Is Nothing (2023), and the Chorki original Khub Kachher Keu (2025).

== Early life and education ==
Arafat Mohsin Nidhi was born on 14 November 1994 in Dhaka, Bangladesh, into a joint family in the Kafrul area, immersed in an environment rich with cinema, music, and theater. His grandfather, Abdus Sobur, was a celebrated art director who received the National Film Award for Best Art Direction seven times for films such as Ghatak (1976), Aradhana (1990), Biraha Byatha, and Shuboda. Nidhi's father, Shamsuzzaman Akhand, a theater enthusiast, died in 2006 when Nidhi was 11. His mother, Mahmuda Begum, is an actress known for her stage performances and continued to support the family's artistic endeavors.

Nidhi's elder brother, Arafat Kirti, introduced him to music, teaching him to play the tabla and guitar from a young age; by two, Nidhi was experimenting with percussion. Exposed to classic Bangladeshi cinema—favorites included Goriber Bou, Babar Adesh, Ammajan, Uttorer Khepa, Mastan'er Opor Mastan, Teji Purush, and Rajnaitik Khela starring actors like Razzak, Jashim, Rubel, and Alamgir—Nidhi developed an early fascination with film scores.

Though formal education details are sparse, Nidhi's upbringing emphasized self-taught skills in music production, honed through family resources and early studio experiments.

== Career ==
=== Music ===
Nidhi's professional journey commenced around 2009 in the advertising sector, crafting jingles for television commercials after his mother loaned funds for a home studio, which he repaid in four months. His breakthrough came via producer Rajib Ashraf, who entrusted him with a project despite a backlog of established composers, marking Nidhi's entry as a music director.

Nidhi composed title songs for approximately 50–60 dramas and web series. Notable television contributions include scores for All Time Dore Opor, YouTuber, Middle Class Sentiment, Bikel Belar Pakhi, Mainkar Chipay, Bodh, Koshtonir, Khachar Bhetor Ochin Pakhi, Black Money, and Amlanama. He also created the patriotic track "Bhalo Thako Bangladesh" for Banglalink during the COVID-19 pandemic in 2020, composed with lyrics by Rasel Mahmud to instill hope amid lockdowns. In advertising, Nidhi penned and sang a Punjabi jingle for an international brand in 2019, showcasing his versatility.

Nidhi's film music debut arrived in 2016 with the background score for Ice Cream, directed by Redoan Rony, followed by the title track "Cheers" for the anthology Iti Tomari Dhaka (2017). Subsequent scores include Damal (2022) and the thriller Surongo (2023). His collaboration with star Shakib Khan in Toofan (2024) realized a childhood dream, where he composed the title track and trailer music under director Habib Wadud. For the action film Borbaad (2025), Nidhi delivered a full orchestral background score, incorporating a rap segment by Saif Khan to heighten tension. In Daagi (2025), he co-sang the upbeat title track with actor Afran Nisho in Nisho's vocal debut, written by Russell Mahmud. Taandob (2025) further featured his immersive sound design.

Nidhi's entry into feature film scoring marked a significant milestone with his debut on the 2016 romantic comedy Ice Cream, directed by Redoan Rony, where he crafted the entire background score to underscore the film's light-hearted narrative of youthful romance and urban escapades in Dhaka.

In the 2017 anthology film Iti Tomari Dhaka, Nidhi contributed the title track "Cheers" and select background cues, infusing the segment with upbeat electronic rhythms and nostalgic synths to capture the anthology's mosaic of Dhaka's diverse urban tales, from slice-of-life dramas to poignant reflections on city living.

Nidhi elevated the thriller genre with his background score for the 2022 sports drama Damal, directed by Raihan Rafi, where he layered triumphant orchestral anthems with percussive football-match simulations to evoke the film's themes of resilience and national pride during the Bangladesh Liberation War.

In 2023, Nidhi scored for Surongo, a high-stakes drama exploring corporate intrigue and personal redemption, where he integrated tense orchestral swells and minimalist electronic motifs to heighten the film's suspenseful atmosphere.

Nidhi's collaboration with Shakib Khan in the 2024 action extravaganza Toofan saw him compose the title track and trailer music. He described the process as a "dream fulfillment," experimenting with live-recorded guitar solos to amplify the hero's larger-than-life persona, while layering ambient drones for introspective moments amid the chaos, creating a dynamic soundscape that propelled the narrative's adrenaline-fueled pace. T

For the 2025 Eid release Borbaad, Nidhi delivered a background score that became a cornerstone of the film's intense action-thriller framework, particularly close to his heart due to its full orchestration including a gritty rap segment featuring Saif Khan.

Nidhi's contributions to the 2025 mythological action film Insaaf included a background score that wove epic choral elements with traditional dhrupad influences. Collaborating with co-composer Tanmoy Parvez, he focused on cyclical rhythmic patterns to symbolize karmic cycles, using temple bells and veena for ethereal sequencess.

The background score for the 2025 fantasy drama Taandob crafted haunting ambient textures and rhythmic incantations to underscore the film's exploration of folklore and human folly, drawing from his theme-scoring sessions documented in personal updates.

In 2019, Nidhi released his debut EP Thako on 15 February via 58Records, comprising four self-composed and mostly self-written tracks: "Adhora" (lyrics by Fabiha Rahman, exploring a woman's multifaceted persona), "Shono Na Tumi" (dedicated to his mother, delving into familial bonds), "Bhalobasho" (on unrequited love triangles), and the title track "Tumi" (inspired by a poetic longing for the night sky).

Nidhi has also ventured into singing, with singles like "She Je Chole Jay" and "Mon" on streaming services. Upcoming projects include Eid 2026 releases.

=== Direction ===
Directing predated Nidhi's music pursuits. His debut was the 2011 Eid telefilm Jonakpoka, aired on local channels. Nidhi returned to helming in 2023 with the short film Everything Is Nothing, selected for the 10th Goa Short Film Festival.

In 2025, Nidhi directed the 40-minute Chorki drama Khub Kachher Keu, a romantic tale of newlyweds penned by his wife Raba Khan, starring Sunerah Binte Kamal and FS Nayeem. The film, praised for its intimate portrayal of marital mundanities, marked his OTT streaming debut. Nidhi views direction as an extension of his storytelling ethos: "Music was the gateway, but visuals complete the vision." He has additionally directed numerous music videos and TV commercials through his production house.

== Personal life ==
Nidhi married content creator, writer, and Forbes 30 Under 30 (Asia 2020) honoree Raba Khan on 5 April 2025, following an akth ceremony attended by family and celebrities.

== Filmography ==
=== Music composer ===
| Year | Title | Type | Notes | Ref. |
|---|---|---|---|---|
| 2011 | Bhalobashi Tai | Drama | Title track | |
| 2011 | Bhalobashi Tai Bhalobeshey Jai | Drama | Title track | |
| 2013 | @18 All Time Dour | Web series | Title music; songs "O Bondhu Lal Golapi" and "Ei Amar Shohor" | |
| 2014 | Bhalobasha 101 | Drama | Title music "Kar Opekkhay Tar Janala" (lyrics & tune by Mohsin) | |
| 2014 | Ice Cream | Film | Background score | |
| 2014 | Middle Class Sentiment | Drama | Title music "Prohor" | |
| 2015 | Monkey Business | Drama | Title music "Jajabor Pakhna" (feat. Nairita) | |
| 2017 | Bikel Belar Pakhi | Drama | Title music | |
| 2018 | Iti Tomari Dhaka | Film | Title track "Cheers" | |
| 2019 | Ditiyo Koishor | Film | Music composer; soundtrack incl. "Omit-Ishaan" | |
| 2020 | Mainkar Chipay | Web series | Title music; soundtrack incl. "Polti Le" (feat. Black Zang) | |
| 2020 | Transit | Drama | Title music | |
| 2020 | Eti Ma | Drama | Background score | |
| 2020 | Ei Shomoye | Web series | Title music | |
| 2021 | Koshtoneer | Web series | Title music | |
| 2021 | YouTumer | Web series | Title music; songs "Jokhon", "Pagla Ghora" (feat. Bonne Hasan) | |
| 2021 | Adhkhana Bhalo Chele | Drama | Title music | |
| 2021 | Khachar Bhitor Ochin Pakhi | Web series | Music composer | |
| 2022 | Damal | Film | Background score | |
| 2022 | Happy Birthday | Short film | Music composer | |
| 2022 | Bodh | Web series | Title music | |
| 2023 | Surongo | Film | Background score; songs incl. "Kolijar Jaan", "Pagla Ghora" | |
| 2023 | Toffee World Cup MV | Music video | Direction and composition for Ali Hasan's track | |
| 2023 | Kuhelika | Web series | Music composer; song "Onubhuti" (feat. Shuvo Das) | |
| 2024 | Toofan | Film | Title track, trailer music | |
| 2025 | Black Money | Web series | Title music; rap track (feat. Cfu36, Rubel) | |
| 2025 | Amalnama | Web series | Music composer; songs incl. "Moner Manush" (feat. Rehaan Rasul), "Lobher Pangkha" | |
| 2025 | Borbaad | Film | Full background score, rap song with Saif Khan | |
| 2025 | Daagi | Film | Title track (co-sung with Afran Nisho) | |
| 2025 | Insaaf | Film | Background score; soundtrack incl. "Tomar Kheyale" | |
| 2025 | Taandob | Film | Background score; songs incl. "Khobor De" (feat. Robiul Islam Jibon) | |
| 2026 | Prince: Once Upon a Time in Dhaka † | Film | Composer | |
| 2026 | Andhar † | Film | Background score | |

=== Director ===
| Year | Title | Type | Notes |
|---|---|---|---|
| 2011 | Jonakpoka | Telefilm | Eid special |
| 2023 | Everything Is Nothing | Short film | Selected at 10th Goa Short Film Festival |
| 2025 | Khub Kachher Keu | Short drama | Chorki original; written by Raba Khan |

== Discography ==
=== Albums/EP ===
- Thako (EP, 2019)
  - "Adhora"
  - "Shono Na Tumi"
  - "Bhalobasho"
  - "Tumi"

=== Selected singles ===
- "Bhalo Thako Bangladesh" (2020)
- "She Je Chole Jay" (sung by Nidhi)
- "Mon" (sung by Nidhi)
- Punjabi jingle for international brand (2019)
