= Afran =

Afran is a surname. Notable people with the surname include:

- Afran Ismayilov (born 1988), Azerbaijani footballer
- Afran Nisho (born 1980), Bangladeshi actor
