= Amalnama =

- Poster
- Directed by: Raihan Rafi
- Screenplay by: Raihan Rafi; SM Nazrul Islam
- Story by: Raihan Rafi
- Produced by: Redoan Rony
- Starring: Zahid Hasan; Sarika Sabrin; Tama Mirza; Gazi Rakayet
- Cinematography: Sumon Sarker
- Edited by: Simit Ray Antor
- Music by: Arafat Mohsin Nidhi
- Production company: Chorki
- Distributed by: Chorki
- Release date: 13 March 2025
- Country: Bangladesh
- Language: Bengali

Amalnama is a 2025 Bangladeshi crime thriller film directed by Raihan Rafi and produced by Redoan Rony under the banner of Chorki. It stars Zahid Hasan, Sarika Sabrin, Kamruzzaman Kamu, Tama Mirza, Gazi Rakayet and others. It was released on OTT platform Chorki on 13 March 2025.

== Cast ==
- Zahid Hasan as Imran Zaman, a police officer
- Sarika Sabrin as Bipasha, Imran's wife
- Kamruzzaman Kamu as Hasan
- Tama Mirza as Parveen
- Gazi Rakayet as Aziz
- Gitashree Chowdhury
- Hashnat Ripon
- Jannatul Mawa Jhilick
- AK Azad Setu
- Inaya Arya

== Release ==
The film was released on the OTT platform Chorki on 13 March 2026.

== Reception ==
=== Critical response ===
Arnob Sanyal of Independent Television noted that, the film drew significant public discussion regarding its narrative inspiration. While the production was marketed as being "inspired by true events" critics noted that promotional elements such as themes of extrajudicial killings and a daughter's final distressed phone call to her father closely mirrored the unresolved real-life death of Teknaf Ward Councillor Ekramul Haque. Tanisha Kabir of The Business Standard described the film as a compelling, slow-burning narrative that critiques systemic injustice and the abuse of power and commended the strong performances of the ensemble cast including Zahid Hasan, Kamruzzaman Kamu, Tama Mirza, Sarika Subrin, and Gazi Rakayet while noting how the film effectively highlights the stark disparity between the privileged and the marginalized.

== Awards ==
Award	Category	Name	Result	Ref.
Blender’s Choice The Daily Star OTT & Digital Content Awards	Best Actress (OTT)	Tama Mirza	Won	
Blender’s Choice The Daily Star OTT & Digital Content Awards	Best Director (OTT)	Raihan Rafi	Won	
