= Shahiduzzaman Selim =

Bangladeshi actor

- শহীদুজ্জামান সেলিম
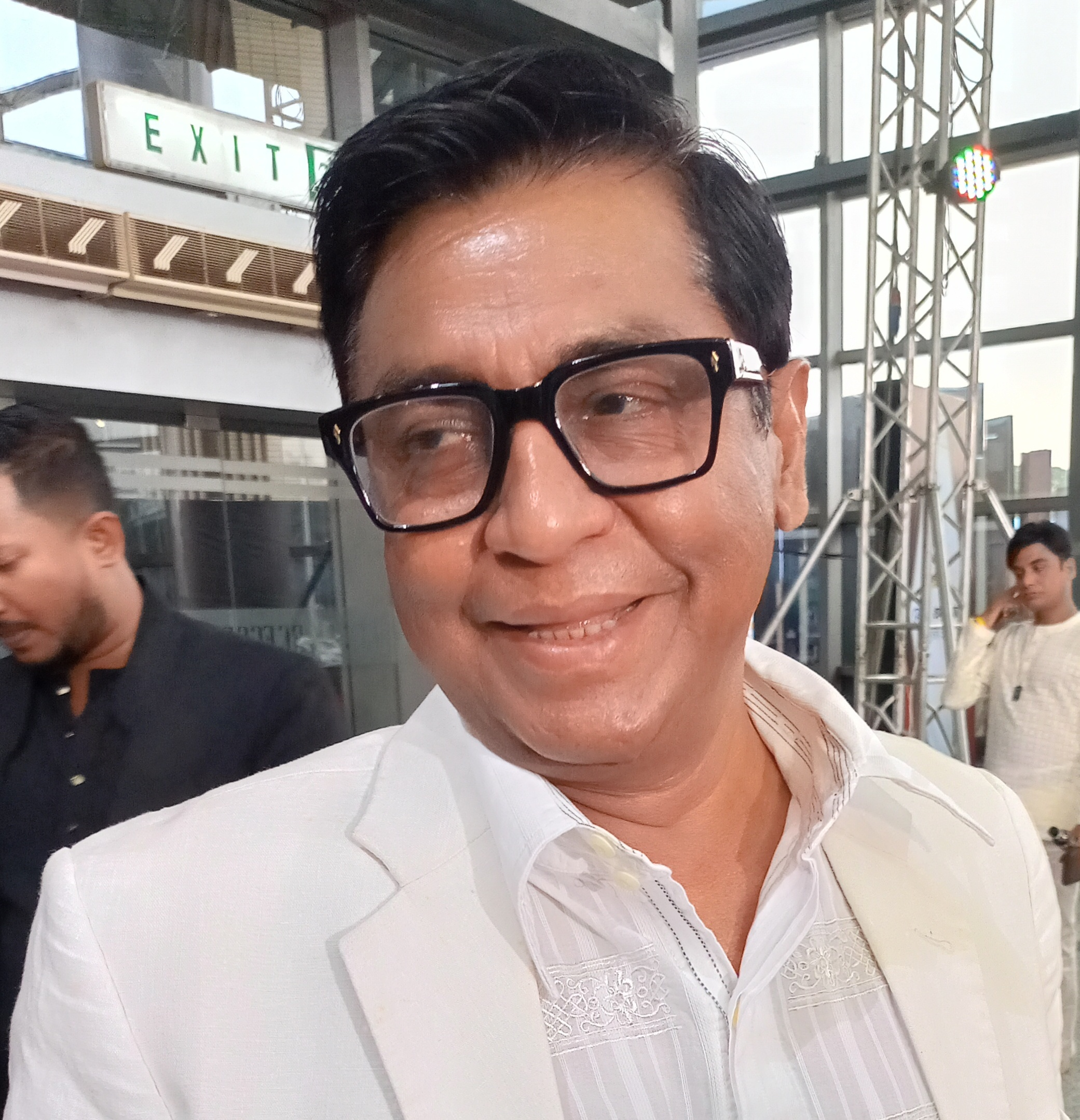
- Born: 5 January 1961 (age 65)
- Education: Jahangirnagar University
- Occupations: Actor, producer, television presenter, businessman
- Years active: 1995-present
- Spouse: Rosey Siddique (m. 1993)
- Children: 2
- Awards: Bangladesh National Film Awards; Meril Prothom Alo Awards

Shahiduzzaman Selim (born January 5) is a Bangladeshi theatre, television and film actor. Known as one of the finest actors in Bangladesh, he won the Bangladesh National Film Award for Best Actor in a Negative Role for his performance in the film Chorabali (2012). He is currently the president of Actors' Equity Bangladesh.

== Early life and education ==
Selim studied in Tangail Bindubashini Government High School up to class two. Then he came to Dhaka and passed SSC examination from Motijheel Ideal School. He studied in Jahangirnagar University in economics department. In his early years he used to work for Reneta Pharmaceuticals Ltd. He joined Dhaka Theatre in 1983 while he was a university student.

== Career ==
In 1989, Selim started his acting career in television through his roles in the drama Jonaki Jwoley. He made four digital films titled Mixed Culture, Ekjon Ajmal Hossain, Abinashi Shabdorashi and Chicago Hridoy in 2008, jointly produced by Chicago Bioscope (US) and Dream Factory (Bangladesh) and shooting of these film were in the United States. Ekjon Ajmal Hossain participated in the Independent Film Festival in the US. He directed DB, a detective TV drama serial in 2012, and Ek Jhak Mrito Jonaki in 2015. Selim has also made two tele-dramas titled Somoy Osomoy and Fera Ar Na Ferar Majhe. He attended North American film festivals where his acted film Bapjaner Bio-scope were shown. Selim is also the caller of "Jahangirnagar University Media Society" (JUMS). In late 2020, he collaborated with Shakib Khan for the first time in Anonno Mamun's legal drama Nabab LLB, where he played as a corrupt advocate fought for antagonist. In the beginning of 2023, he performed as a home minister in the Topu Khan's political drama Leader: Amie Bangladesh, which was a commercial hit at box office and become one of highest-grossing film of the year. In the middle of that year, he also performed as an antagonist in Himel Ashraf's tragic romance Priyotoma.

== Awards and nominations ==
Year	Award	Category	Film/Drama	Result	Ref.
2010	Meril Prothom Alo Awards	Critics Choice Best TV Actor	Kanta	Won	
2012	Bangladesh National Film Awards	Beat Negative Role	Chorabali	Won	
2025	BIFA Awards	Breakthrough Performance Actor	Daagi	Won	
2026	Bangladesh National Film Awards 2023	Best Comedian	Surongo	Won	

== Television appearances ==
=== Acted dramas ===
Year	Title	Playwright & Director	Aired on	Note & Source
1989	Jonaki Jwole			
	Mamuli Bepar	M Hamid	BTV	TV play, first drama of Selim-Suborna pair
	Gronthikgon Kohe			TV serial
	Bhalobashi Koto – Bhalobashi Na To			
	Jor			
	Rong Mohol			
	Gayer Manush			
	Juarir Bou			
	Ononto Prodip			
2010	Lilaboti	Humayun Ahmed; Arun Chowdhury	ATN Bangla	TV serial, based on Humayun Ahmed's novel of same title
2010	Jhamela Nonstop	Maruf Rahman; Shahiduzzaman Selim		TV play, aired on Eid
2011	Ebar Dhora Dao	Abdullah al Mamun; Tarique Muhammad Hasan	NTV	single episode TV play
2011	Dushshaha Dharmini			telefilm
2011	Relax Boss			single-episode TV play
2011	Chorer Bou			single-episode TV play
2012	Priyo	Imdadul Haque Milon; Chayanika Chowdhury	NTV	TV serial
2012	Keramoti			
2012	Dokshinayoner Din	Sajjad Sumon	NTV	TV serial, based on the novel trilogy of Shawkat Ali's "Dokshinayoner Din", "Kulai Kalshrot" & "Purboratri Purbodin"
2012	Pother Dabi			based on the novel of Sarat Chandra Chattopadhyay
2012	Batase Muktir Ghran	Alvi Ahmed	Channel 24	TV play, aired on Eid
2012	Freedom	Alvi Ahmed	Maasranga Television	TV play, aired on Eid
2012	Sab Badha Periye	Rashed Raha		TV play, aired on Eid
2012	Chor Elo Mor Ghorey	Litu Sakhawat; Shahiduzzaman Selim	Desh TV	TV play, aired on Eid
2014	Neyamot O Tar Bibigon	Rupantor; Aniruddho Rassel	SA TV	six-episode TV serial, juggles with four wives
2014	Aji Bijon Ghore	Shahid Raman; Rahmatullah Tuhin		TV play
2014	Ami Mayer Kachhe Jabo			
2014	Onubhobe	Monsur Rahman Chanchal; Shahiduzzaman Selim	Channel i	TV play, aired on October 24, 2014
2015	Monkey Bizness	Rahat Rahman	NTV	TV play
2015	Bakharkhani	Tuhin Rasel; Tanim Parvez	Desh TV	a weeklong mini TV Series, aired on Eid-ul-Fitr
2015	Neyamoter Keyamot	Rupantor; Aniruddho Rassel	SA TV	six-episode TV serial, aired on Eid-ul-Fitr
2015	Pattayar Pathe Neyamat	Rupantor; Aniruddho Rassel	SA TV	six-episode TV serial; sequel of Neyamat Ali, aired on Eid-ul-Adha
2015	Mongol Chhaya		Channel i	single-episode TV play; aired on Eid-ul-Adha
2015	Megher Chhaya		Channel 9	single-episode teleplay; aired on Eid-ul-Adha
2015	Bhalobashi Tai		GTV	single-episode teleplay; aired on Eid-ul-Adha
2015	Ekdin Chhuti Hobe	Faruq Ahmed; Himel Ashraf	NTV	TV serial
2015	Jiboner Oli Goli	Fazlur Rahman	ATN Bangla	TV serial, aired every Monday, Tuesday, & Wednesday
2015	Ekjon Mayaboti	Arun Chowdhury & Mazharul Islam	Channel i	TV serial, adoption of Humayun Ahmed's novel of same title
2019	Family Crisis	Mohammad Mostafa Kamal Raz	NTV	TV series
2020	Stupids	Mabrur Rashid Bannah		TV series
2021	Ma Baba Bhai Bon	Hasan Rezaul	NTV	TV series
2022	Family Crisis Reloaded			

=== Directed TV dramas ===
Year	Title	Playwright	Aired on	Note & Source
2010	Cornett		Desh TV	TV serial
2010	Easy Marriage Media Limited		ATN Bangla	
2010	Jojon Jojon Durey		ATN Bangla	
2010	Jhamela Nonstop	Maruf Rahman		TV play, aired on Eid
2011	Sporsher Baire			TV serial
2011	Rongchhut			TV serial
2011	Samantha		Maasranga Television	TV serial
2012	DB		ATN Bangla	detective TV drama
2012	Chor Elo Mor Ghorey	Litu Sakhawat	Desh TV	TV play, aired on Eid
2013	Keu Keu Mrito Jonaki			
2014	Onubhobe	Monsur Rahman Chanchal	Channel i	TV play, aired on October 24, 2014
2015	Ek Jhak Mrito Jonaki			
2015	Somoy O Osomoy		ntv	telefilm; aired on fifth day of Eid-ul-Adha
2015	Fera Ar Na Ferar Majhe	Pantha Shahriar	ATN Bangla	telefilm; aired on sixth day of Eid-ul-Adha

=== TV programs ===
- "Amar Ami" on Banglavision in 2012

=== Directed theatre dramas ===
- Ponchonari Akkhyan (2015) written by Harun Rashid

== Web series ==
Year	Title	OTT	Character	Co-Artist	Director	Notes
2017	Feluda Golokdam Rahasya	Bioscope		Parambrata Chatterjee, Rawnak Hasan, Ahsan Habib Nasim, Riddhi Sen		
2018	Indubala			Popy, ABM Sumon, Achol, Tariq Anam Khan	Anonno Mamun	
2019	Beauty and the Bullet	Bioscope		Afran Nisho, Tahsan, Emon, Momo, Mim, Mim Mantasha, Tariq Anam Khan, Suborna Mustafa, Shahed Ali	Animesh Aich	Bioscope Original Web Series
2020	Kuasha			ABM Sumon, Tisha	Mohammad Mostafa Kamal Raz	
2020	August 14	Binge	Rafiqul Islam	Tasnuva Tisha, Monira Mithu, Shatabdi Wadud, Sayed Zaman Shawon, Abu Hurayra Tanvir	Shihab Shaheen	Binge Original Web Series
2021	E Emon Porichoy	ZEE5		Rosey Siddiqui, Shamol Mawla, Aisha Khan Tahiya	Nazrul Islam Raju	A ZEE5 Web Series
2021	Middle Class Din Ratri		Narrator	Rosey Siddiqui, Allen Shuvro, Prottoy Heron	Sheikh Nazmul Huda Emon	

== Filmography ==
Year	Film	Role	Notes
1993	Ekattorer Jishu		
2007	Made in Bangladesh		
2009	Chandragrohon	Ismail Driver	
2012	Chorabali	Ali Osman / Mafia God Father	Won – Bangladesh National Film Awards for Best Negative Role
2013	Devdas	Chunibabu	
2014	Meghmallar	Nurul Huda	
2015	Podmo Patar Jol	Sarfaraz	
2015	Bapjaner Bioscope	Jibon sarkar	
2016	Oggatonama	Ramjan Ali	
2016	Lal Char	Talukder	
2016	Shankhachil		
2017	Sultana Bibiana		
2020	Nabab LLB: Back for Justice		
2021	Moronottom		Released on Bongo BOB
2021	Chokh	Rezni's father	
2021	Mission Extreme		
2022	Poran		
2022	Psycho		
2022	Amanush		
2022	Kagoj: The Paper	Writer	
2022	Mayashalik	Sara's father	Released on Binge
2023	Adom		
2023	Leader: Amie Bangladesh	Home Minister	
2023	Ekhane Nongor		Released on Rtv
2023	Lal Shari	Kashem Mohajon	
2023	Priyotoma	Usman	
2023	Surongo	Apel Khan	
2023	Jimmi		
2024	Omar	Ahsanul Haque Mirza	
2024	Toofan	Shanawaz	
2025	Jongli	Barrister Sharafat Chowdhury	
2025	Daagi	Ranjith Singh	
2025	Borbaad	A Senior Barrister	
2025	Taandob	Former IGP Rafiqullah	
2025	Jol Rong	Adam Bepari	
2025	Fereshteh		Bangladesh-Iran joint production film
2026	Sardar Barir Khela		
2026	Pressure Cooker	Barkat	
2026	Anondo Osru	Amjad Ahmed Khan	
2026	Khalnayak †	TBA	Filming

== Personal life ==
Selim is married to actress Rosey Siddique. Together they have two daughters.
