= Taandob =

2025 Bangladeshi political action thriller film

- Theatrical poster
- Bengali: তাণ্ডব
- Directed by: Raihan Rafi
- Screenplay by: Adnan Adib Khan; Raihan Rafi
- Story by: Raihan Rafi
- Produced by: Shahriar Shakil
- Starring: Shakib Khan; Sabila Nur; Jaya Ahsan
- Cinematography: Tahsin Rahman
- Edited by: Editry
- Music by: Arafat Mohsin; Pritom Hasan; Tanvir Ahmed; Arindom Chatterjee; Naved Parvez
- Production companies: Alpha-i; SVF
- Distributed by: Chorki
- Release date: 7 June 2025
- Running time: 130 Minutes
- Country: Bangladesh
- Language: Bengali
- Box office: ৳30 crore (US$2.4 million)

Taandob (Note: Bengali: তাণ্ডব, romanized: Tāṇḍôb, Bengali pronunciation: [ˈtaːnɖob]; transl. Rampage) is a 2025 Bangladeshi political action thriller film written and directed by Raihan Rafi, who also co-wrote the screenplay with Adnan Adib Khan. The story of the film revolves around an attack made on a fictional television channel which leads to unfold contemporary socio-political issues such as unemployment, exploitation of power, corruption, enforced disappearance and extrajudicial killings in Bangladesh, featuring Shakib Khan, Sabila Nur and Jaya Ahsan in the lead roles.

Produced by Shahriar Shakil under the banner of Alpha-i and co-produced by SVF, Taandob was released on 7 June 2025 during Eid-ul-Adha. It was Raihan Rafi's seventh directorial and second collaboration with Shakib Khan. It is the introduction of a interconnected cinematic universe, named after It's director Raihan Rafi Cinematic Universe. During its first week of release, the full film was leaked online in High-definition format, becoming one of the most widely discussed piracy incidents in the Bangladeshi film industry. Although the incident led to a case under copyright law, a police investigation and the arrest of three individuals. However, how the film's original digital copy reached unauthorised individuals remains unclear.

The film received positive reviews from critics, who praised the cast performances (especially Shakib Khan and Siam Ahmed), along with the direction, music, story, visuals, emotional impact, social themes and action sequences. It went on to become a commercial success. Taandob is the second highest grossing Bangladeshi film of 2025 as well as fourth highest grossing Bangladeshi film of all time.

== Cast ==
- Shakib Khan in dual role:
  - Mikhail, a wanted criminal, who leads a hostage attack posing as Swadhin
  - (flashback scene) Swadhin, an innocent man with a tragic past
    - Rakib Hossain Evon as real Swadhin
- Sabila Nur as Nishat, a fickle girl and Swadhin's love interest.
- Jaya Ahsan as Saira Ali, a retired journalist anchoring the hostage broadcast.
- Fazlur Rahman Babu as Muhibuddin, Inspector General of Police of Bangladesh Police
- Subrata Fardin as Nishat's father
- Aminur Rahman Mukul as Salam, Swadhin's father
- Rasheda Chowdhury as Nishat's mother
- Shiba Shanu as Shafiuddin, a senior jailer of the Iron Cell
- Shahiduzzaman Selim as Rafiqullah, a former Inspector General of Police of Bangladesh Police
- Ejajul Islam as Mahtab Hossain, Minister of Power and Energy of Bangladesh
- Afzal Hossain as Monayem Chowdhury, current Religion Minister and Former Minister of Home Affairs
- FS Nayeem as Bayezid, chief commander of SWAT team
- Gazi Rakayet as Fayez Karim, owner of "Channel Bangla"
- Mukit Zakaria as Mashur, CEO of "Channel Bangla"
- Sumon Anowar as ADC Kamrul
- An unnamed actor as J.W. Harris
- Monir Ahmed Shakeel as Amjad Mansoor
- Salahuddin Lavlu
- Saad Salmi Naovi as Evaan, Saira Ali's sibling (Cameo appearance)
- Tariq Anam Khan (Special appearance)
- Siam Ahmed as Armaan Mansoor, son of Amjad Mansoor (Special appearance)
- Afran Nisho as Masud, a vengeful man hinting at future reckoning (Special appearance from Surongo)

== Production ==
=== Development ===
Shortly after the release of Toofan (2024), director Raihan Rafi announced plans for a sequel titled Toofan 2. However, the project did not move forward. He later reunited with Shakib Khan for a new collaboration, Taandob, as their second collaboration. The film's title was officially registered with the Bangladesh Film Directors Association on 1 December 2024, as confirmed to Desh Rupantor by Shaheen Sumon, the association's General Secretary. It is a joint production venture between Indian studio Shree Venkatesh Films and Bangladeshi company Alpha-i Entertainment Ltd., with OTT platform Chorki serving as a co-producer and Deepto TV providing additional support. According to a report published by Prothom Alo in the first week of December 2024, director Raihan Rafi had begun pre-production work on the film. While Rafi had officially signed on as director, producer Shahriar Shakil confirmed that lead actor Shakib Khan had expressed verbal interest in the project. Shihab Nurun Nabi has been appointed as the art director of the film. He previously collaborated with Khan and director Rafi on the 2024 period film Toofan, where his recreation of 1990s Dhaka received critical acclaim. His work on that project has set high expectations for the visual storytelling in the film. Director Rafi wrote the story for the film and Adnan Adib Khan, who previously wrote the screenplay for Toofan, co-wrote the screenplay for the film in collaboration with Rafi.

Shakib Khan reunited with director Raihan Rafi for the film Taandob, following the widespread success of Toofan (2024). Khan officially signed onto the project on 13 February 2025, in the presence of Shahriar Shakil, managing director of SVF–Alpha-i Entertainment Ltd., and director Raihan Rafi. In a report published on 26 March 2025, NTV stated that television actress and model Sabila Nur would play the female lead opposite Khan, marking her debut in films. The report also noted that Jaya Ahsan would appear in a special role, while actor Sariful Razz might make a brief cameo lasting approximately 40 seconds. In a report published by Prothom Alo on the same day, producer Shahriar Shakil confirmed Jaya Ahsan's involvement in the film but dismissed reports suggesting that Sabila Nur had been cast as the second female lead. He stated that no final decision had been made regarding the role, although a preliminary shortlist of five to six names had been prepared, which may have included Nur. Shakil added that the casting would ultimately depend on the suitability of the actor for the story and character. According to a report published by Samakal on 7 April, Ahsan had participated in the film's shooting prior to Eid and will reportedly portray a journalist. Subsequently, rumours emerged suggesting that Nur had been removed from the film, a claim that was reported by several media outlets. On 9 April, NTV reported, citing a source associated with the production, that complications regarding the lead actress had caused the cancellation of filming scheduled for 8 April. On 28 April, several footage, including still photos and videos from a song sequence shoot in Puthia, Rajshahi, featuring Shakib Khan and Sabila Nur, were leaked on social media. The footages confirmed Nur's involvement as the film's lead actress, marking her debut on the big screen. (Note: Attributed to multiple sources:) Several media outlets initially reported that Ekushey Padak-winning actor Afzal Hossain had joined the casting, marking his first on-screen collaboration with Khan. He portrayed the chief of the police Special Weapons and Tactics (SWAT) unit. He later confirmed his involvement in the film to The Daily Star. In a subsequent podcast hosted by Rumman Rashid Khan, Hossain revealed that he had initially been reluctant to act in the film but later reconsidered his decision following a request from his friend, Faridur Reza Sagar.

Model and actress Nidra Dey Neha confirmed her involvement in the film in an interview with Prothom Alo, also affirming her participation in the shooting. Neha was reportedly removed from the film following media reports, citing allegations of breaching confidentiality. Prior to her removal, she had taken part in one day of shooting. She later described the decision as unprofessional. (Note: Attributed to multiple sources:)

=== Filming ===
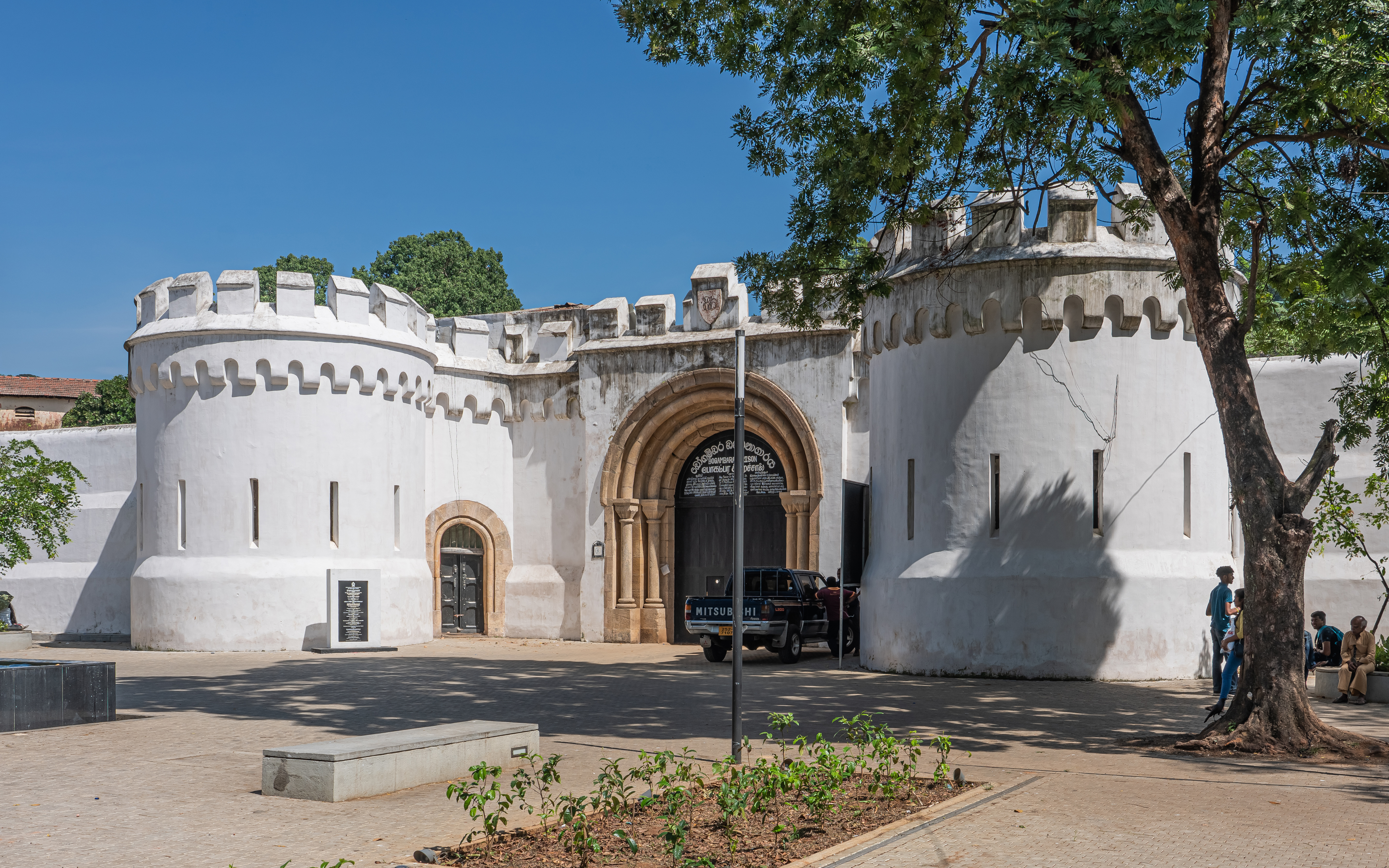
One of film's action sequences was filmed in Bogambara Prison in Kandy, Sri Lanka.

The principal photography was scheduled to begin in February 2025; however, it was postponed due to various reasons. Subsequently, principal photography for the film began on 24 March, as confirmed by the director to Kaler Kantho. As of late April, approximately 70 percent of the film's filming had reportedly been completed. A song and portions of the climax action sequence of the film were scheduled to be shot in Sri Lanka. Shakib Khan traveled there on 16 May, accompanied by co-star Sabila Nur and members of the technical crew. According to reports, the cast and crew planned to stay in Sri Lanka for a week. One of the film's key sequences was filmed at Bogambara Prison in Kandy, Sri Lanka, a former prison.

== Music ==
=== Background ===
Music direction for one of the film's songs was handled by Naved Parvez.

=== Singles ===
The film's first track Taandob Theme was released on May 28, 2026, coinciding with the 26th anniversary of Shakib Khan's career in cinema. Shifat Abdullah Abir wrote and performed the song, while Tanvir Ahmed composed its music. This was followed by the release of the second single, Lichur Bagan, on 2 June, which featured vocals by Pritom Hasan and Xefer Rahman, with additional vocals by Aleya Begum and Mongol Miah. Hasan also composed and arranged the music, while the lyrics were jointly written by Sattar Pagla, Pritom Hasan, Mehedi Ansari and Inamul Tahsin. The music video was directed by Baba Yadav and Ruhul Amin.

No.	Title	Lyrics	Music	Singer(s)	Length
1.	"Taandob Theme"	Shifat Abdullah Abir	Tanvir Ahmed	Shifat Abdullah Abir	01:40
2.	"Lichur Bagane"	Sattar Pagla; Pritom Hasan; Mehedi Ansari; Inamul Tahsin	Pritom Hasan	Pritom Hasan; Xefer Rahman; Mongol Mia; Aleya Begum	3:29
3.	"Tomake Bhalobeshe Jete Chai"	Prasen	Arindom Chatterjee	Arindom Chatterjee; Shirsha Chakraborty	3:23
4.	"Khobor De"	Robiul Islam Jibon	Arafat Mohsin	Arafat Mohsin	1:43
5.	"Jwolonto Agun"	CFU 36	Arafat Mohsin	CFU 36, Arafat Mohsin	2:53

=== Notes ===
- Exact release dates, composers, lyricists, and singers for some tracks are not fully specified in available sources, as some songs may be fan-made or pending official confirmation.
- The total length of the soundtrack is unavailable due to incomplete track duration data.

== Marketing and release ==
=== Marketing ===
The first look poster of the film was released on 28 March 2025, coinciding with Khan's 46th birthday. On 18 May 2025, a 1-minute and 41-second teaser of the film named Taandob Forecast was released, featuring Khan wearing a monkey mask. The teaser quickly gained attention on social media and received positive responses from both viewers and critics. It garnered more than 1 crore views across social media platforms within 24 hours, setting a record for the most views received by a Bangladeshi film's promotional content in a single day. As part of its promotional strategy, the makers released the trailer for the film on the second day of its theatrical run.

Following its submission to the Bangladesh Film Certification Board, the film was reviewed by the board, which recommended a single modification: increasing the font size of the mandatory health warning, "Smoking/tobacco use causes death", to comply with health warning regulations. Upon completion of the modification, the film received an uncut certificate on June 4, 2026, with a runtime of 130 minutes.

A press conference was held in Gulshan, Dhaka, on 5 June, two days before the film's release, to introduce its cast. Attendees included director Raihan Rafi, producer and Alpha-i managing director Shahriar Shakil, Chorki chief executive officer Redoan Rony, and actors Shakib Khan, Jaya Ahsan and Sabila Nur, along with other cast and crew members. h

A new promotional trailer for the OTT version was released ahead of its premiere on Chorki, revealing the guest appearances of Afran Nisho and Siam Ahmed, whose cameo roles were not featured in the theatrical trailer.

=== Release ===
The film was released in 132 theatres in Bangladesh on June 7, 2025, coinciding with Eid al-Adha.

BiosKope Films released the film in the United States and Canada on June 13, 2025, marking the company's 50th international distribution. It was released in Australia on June 20, with distribution handled by BongOz Films.

The film's makers held a special screening on June 22, attended by the lead actors, other cast and crew members, journalists and media personalities.

Following its theatrical run, the film was released on the Bangladeshi OTT platforms Chorki and DeeptoPlay, as well as the Indian platform Hoichoi. It premiered on Chorki and Hoichoi on August 7, 2025, followed by DeeptoPlay on August 14. The film was made available to viewers in Bangladesh and abroad, allowing Bengali-speaking audiences worldwide to stream it.

The film was screened at the 24th Amar Bhashar Chalachitra Utsab 1432 on February 4, 2026, one of the largest Bengali-language film festival, organised by the Dhaka University Film Society, and is held in commemoration of the Language Movement and its martyrs.

== Controversy ==
Model and actress Nidra Dey Neha confirmed her involvement in the film in an interview with Prothom Alo, also affirming her participation in the shooting. She was reportedly removed from the project following media reports, citing allegations of breaching confidentiality. Prior to her removal, she had taken part in one day of shooting. Neha later described the decision as unprofessional. Initially reported to have quit acting over allegations of misconduct, she later clarified to Samakal that she had not left the profession but rather stated she would not work with the production company unless it operated with full professionalism. On 3 April 2025, during filming at the Hi-Tech Park in Rajshahi, a stuntman named Monir Hossain died of a heart attack on the set of the film.

On 6 June, the screening of the film at Auliabad Auditorium in Kalihati Upazila, Tangail, was halted following pressure from Islamist groups. Although the groups later withdrew their objections, the theatre authorities ultimately decided to discontinue the screenings, citing the controversy and negative attention surrounding the protests.

=== Online piracy ===
Despite the production company's efforts to prevent piracy, including hiring a monitoring team and an anti-piracy agency before the film's release, its high-definition version began circulating on various Telegram channels on June 13, 2025, six days after its release. Subsequent reports emerged that the full film was also available on piracy websites and had been shared on YouTube and Facebook. In response, director Raihan Rafi stated that legal action would be taken against those involved in its unauthorised distribution.

On June 16, 2025, the film's producer and Alpha-i chief executive officer Shahriar Shakil filed a copyright infringement case under the Copyright law of Bangladesh at Banani Police Station in Dhaka. During the investigation, the Detective Branch of Bangladesh Police arrested three individuals on June 17, including two YouTubers and a cinema hall operator. On June 18, a Dhaka Metropolitan Magistrate Court granted police two days of remand for the three individuals. After the remand ended on June 20, the court ordered that they be sent to jail.

According to the police investigation, the pirated version was first uploaded to a Telegram channel before spreading to other online platforms. In a published technical analysis, filmmaker Dipankar Dipon stated that the leaked version was not an ordinary cam print but a high-quality digital version. He suggested that it may have originated from within the film's digital exhibition and distribution system. However, the precise circumstances of the leak have not been conclusively established.

Director Raihan Rafi and the production company took steps to remove unauthorised versions from the internet. The incident also raised concerns about its potential impact on the film's commercial performance. However, the production company did not disclose the extent of any financial losses resulting from the piracy. Film commentators also raised concerns about weaknesses in Bangladesh's theatrical distribution infrastructure and the lack of adequate technological safeguards against piracy.

== Reception ==
=== Audience response ===
Following the release of the film's teaser, it attracted significant attention on social media and received generally positive feedback from viewers and some critics. Reports indicated that the teaser surpassed 10 million views across various social media platforms within 24 hours of its release.

=== Critical reception ===
Rahman Moti of Bangla Movie Database rated the film 8.5 out of 10 and praised its direction, storytelling, performances and technical execution, highlighting Khan's voice modulation and physicality, as well as its role as a promising beginning for a cinematic universe in Bangladeshi cinema. Rabbani Rabbi of Independent Television rated the film 4.10 out of 5, praising its political themes, performances and technical aspects, particularly Khan's acting, while criticising its rushed ending and insufficient exploration of the main characters' ideological backgrounds. Manjurul Alam of Prothom Alo praised the film's nonlinear storytelling, performances, and exploration of social and political issues. Alongside Shakib Khan's versatile performance, he also commended the performances of Siam Ahmed, Afran Nisho, Jaya Ahsan, and Sabila Nur, while criticising its uneven pacing, narrative inconsistencies, and abrupt song sequences. He described the film as an enjoyable Eid release. Writing for The Business Standard, Tahira Islam gave the film a positive review, commending its screenplay, performances and technical execution, singling out Khan's performance and its ambitious introduction of an interconnected cinematic universe. Despite criticising some editing issues and an overly complicated twist, she considered the film's ambition and storytelling a significant achievement for Dhallywood. Film critic Ahsan Kabir from Bangla Tribune rated Taandob 6 out of 10. He praised its direction, cinematography, suspenseful storytelling, and performances, particularly those of Jaya Ahsan, Sabila Nur, and Siam Ahmed. However, he criticised the plot's final twist, questions surrounding character identities, and logical inconsistencies. He also questioned the film's portrayal of its social and political context, ultimately describing it as a questionable film. Mustafa Monon in Samakal praised the film's direction, cinematography, and performances, particularly those Khan and Ahsan, its technical execution and entertaining crime-thriller narrative. However, he criticised its lack of originality and narrative inconsistencies, while describing it as an entertaining film and a symbol of the "Diamond Era" of Bangladeshi cinema. Writing for Prothom Alo's New York edition, Farida Yasmin commended its social and political themes, the performances of Shakib Khan and Jaya Ahsan, and its depiction of contemporary issues in Bangladesh, but noted shortcomings in Sabila Nur's costume and makeup. Similarly, Syed Nazmus Sakib considered the film Rafi's most distinctive directorial, praising Khan's performance, storytelling, cinematography and technical execution, particularly Tahsin Rahman's camerawork and the one-take sequences. He described it as one of his finest cinematic experiences in Bangladeshi cinema. Pritha Parmita Nag of Prothom Alo praised the film for its political commentary on enforced disappearances, extrajudicial killings and corruption, as well as its action sequences, cinematography and ensemble performances, highlighting Khan's voice modulation and Ahsan's performance. Although she also criticised the film's uneven pacing, underdeveloped characters and narrative inconsistencies, but considered it one of Raihan Rafi's best works.

Writer Mahfuz Siddique Himalay criticised the film's weak narrative, rushed execution, underdeveloped characters and similarities to other action thrillers. While acknowledging its political themes and cast performances, he questioned its music, promotional appeal and ability to sustain its initial box-office success. In addition, Nifat Sultana of Bdnews24.com praised the film's political themes, plot and ensemble performances, but criticised its derivative storytelling, similarities to Indian films Jawan and Animal, abrupt song sequences and weak action scenes.

=== Box office ===
Although Bangladesh does not have any official box office system, making single-screen earnings unavailable, according to media reports that the film's multiplex gross reached ৳1.85 crore by the end of its third day. Following of its first week of release, on 15 June 2025, the film had entered the ৳6 crore club, becoming the third film of the year to reach the milestone. It also recorded its highest single-day collection on its seventh day, surpassing its previous record. According to The Asian Age, the film grossed ৳9.05 crore at the box office within 16 days of release, as reported on June 25, 2025. The film sold over ৳12 crore tickets from multiplexes and nearly ৳18 crore from single screens in a month, for a total gross collection of over ৳30 crore.

== Analysis and themes ==
Taandob explores themes of political oppression, human rights, corruption and media freedom against the backdrop of political unrest in Bangladesh. Through its depiction of extrajudicial killings, enforced disappearances and clandestine detention facilities, the film draws parallels with the practices of the country's former authoritarian government. Its fictional Iron Cell alludes to the real-life Aynaghar, while the appearances and dialogue of several characters evoke political figures associated with the previous administration. The film also addresses unemployment, press freedom and institutional corruption, using political satire and dark humour to examine political double standards, media manipulation and public apathy. Its central character, Swadhin (Shakib Khan), embodies moral ambiguity: despite advocating justice and principles, he disregards the law himself, raising questions about the distinction between seeking justice and upholding it. While the film's political commentary and unconventional approach to the hero–villain dynamic have been praised, some critics considered its social commentary potentially provocative and its narrative execution inconsistent, citing incomplete scenes, uneven pacing and an overly complicated plot twist.

== Awards and nominations ==
Meril-Prothom Alo Awards

Awards	Date of Events	Category	Section	Recipients	Results	Ref
Meril-Prothom Alo Awards	April, 24 2026	Best Feature Film	Popular choice	Shahriar Shakil	Nominated	
Meril-Prothom Alo Awards	April, 24 2026	Best Film Actress	Popular choice	Sabila Nur	Nominated	
Meril-Prothom Alo Awards	April, 24 2026	Best Female Singer	Popular choice	Xefar Rahman – "Lichur Bagane"	Won	

== Future ==
The film's post-credits scene ended on a cliffhanger, hinting at a continuation of the story with a title card reading Taandob 2 loading. Director Raihan Rafi confirmed that he planned to establish a Bengali cinematic universe, similar to those developed in other film industries. The film marks the beginning of an interconnected cinematic universe named the Raihan Rafi Cinematic Universe, after its director. Rafi stated that his vision was to create a global cinematic universe bringing together multiple characters and storylines, with Taandob serving as the beginning for the project.
