= Raba Khan =

Bangladeshi vlogger

Raba Khan রাবা খান
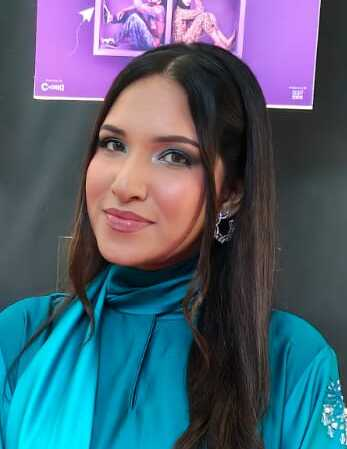
- Raba Khan_Chorki_2026_Program
- Born: 11 May 1998 (age 28); Sydney, Australia

Instagram information
- Page: rabakhan
- Followers: 790 thousand

YouTube information
- Channel: TheJhakanakaProject
- Years active: 2014-present
- Subscribers: 286 thousand
- Views: 34.2 million
- Last updated: 21 December 2025

Raba Khan (born 11 May 1998) is a Bangladeshi vlogger, comedian, model, singer, and author. She is known for her satirical commentary on everyday life in Bangladesh. She is a radio jockey at ABC Radio. In 2020, Raba was featured in Forbes' 30 Under 30 Asia list in the Media, Marketing & Advertising category. She is a UNICEF Youth Ambassador and has worked to advocate for children's rights. In 2019, she published a book, Bandhobi, written in an informal combination of Bangla and English.

== Early life and family ==
Raba Khan was born in a Muslim family on 11 May 1998 in Sydney. Her father is a businessman, and her mother is a housewife. She has a brother named Fahad Reaz Khan who is a director. She moved to Dhaka, Bangladesh with her family when she was 16 years old.

== Career ==
Raba Khan started her career as a YouTuber in June 2014 at the age of 15 by posting her debut video "Bengali Couples React to Break-Ups (with classic songs)". Her brother used to be in some of those videos, and has been a contributor to her content. At the age of 16, she joined Radio Foorti as a jockey.

She became known for her personal vlogs and videos about Bengali life on her YouTube channel, TheJhakanakaProject. Some of her videos are satirical, addressing social issues and stereotypes in Bangladesh, others include Khan singing or lip-syncing, or reenacting old TV commercials. She also makes vlogs relating to travel and shopping. On April 2, 2020, she was featured on the cover of Forbes magazine's Asia edition, becoming the youngest person from Bangladesh to be recognized by Forbes.

In 2018, she became a Youth Ambassador to advocate for children's rights by UNICEF. She is a goodwill ambassador for ActionAid. She also owns a fashion line named JKNK.

=== বান্ধobi ===
The cover of the book Bandhobi (transl. 'Friend'), written by Raba Khan

Besides YouTube and modeling, Raba Khan also writes books. Her debut book, named Bandhobi (styled as বান্ধobi, Bangladeshi slang for "girlfriend"), was published in 2019. The book chronicles the lives of nine young women in Dhaka, in the form of a teenager's anecdotes. The book is written in a causal and laxed use of the Bangla language.

=== Personal life ===
In April 2025, Raba Khan married musician Arafat Mohsin Nidhi. The duo announced the news on their official Instagram handles.
