= Damal (film) =

2022 Bangladeshi film

- Theatrical release poster
- Directed by: Raihan Rafi
- Written by: Faridur Reza Sagar
- Screenplay by: Nazim Ud Daula; Raihan Rafi
- Produced by: Faridur Reza Sagar; Abu Shahed Emon
- Starring: Sariful Razz; Bidya Sinha Saha Mim; Siam Ahmed; Shahnaz Sumi
- Cinematography: Sumon Sarker
- Music by: Arafat Mohsin
- Production company: Impress Telefilm
- Distributed by: Jaaz Multimedia; Bioskope Films
- Release date: 28 October 2022 (Bangladesh)
- Running time: 130 mins
- Country: Bangladesh
- Language: Bengali
- Budget: ৳20 million (US$160,000)
- Box office: est. ৳20 million (US$160,000)

Damal is a 2022 Bangladeshi period drama film directed by Raihan Rafi and produced by Impress Telefilm. Set on the Bangladesh liberation war, the film features Sariful Razz, Bidya Sinha Saha Mim, Siam Ahmed and Shahnaz Sumi in lead role. The film presents a fictional storyline inspired from the Shadhin Bangla football team, the team toured throughout India playing a total of 16 friendly matches to raise international awareness and economic support for the liberation war.

== Premise ==
The depressed members of Bangladesh women's football team bid farewell to their coach before he asked them to stop and sit down. The coach, who was the manager of the Shadhin Bangla football team in 1971, started narrating the heroics of the legendary football team to inspire them.

== Cast ==
- Sariful Razz as Munna, captain of the football team
- Bidya Sinha Saha Mim as Hasna, wife of Munna
- Siam Ahmed as Durjoy, striker of the football team
- Shahnaz Sumi as Ema and girlfriend of Durjoy
- Sumit Sengupta as Munir, the goalkeeper
- Intekhab Dinar as the manager of Shadhin Bangla football team and the coach of the women football team
- Kayes Chowdhury as a doctor and the father of Munna
- Rashed Mamun Apu as Tuku Mia, a Razakar and General Secretary of East Pakistan Central Peace Committee
- Nasir Uddin Khan as a coach
- Samia Othoi as a striker of the women football team
- Syed Nazmus Sakib as a guerilla fighter and a friend of Durjoy
- Puja Agnes Cruze
- Sarwat Azad Bristi
- Mahamudul Islam Mithu
- AK Azad Setu as the commander of a team of freedom fighters
- Somu Chowdhury as Durjoy's father
- Azam Khan
- Mili Bashar as Durjoy's elder mother
- Naziba Bashar as Durjoy's young mother
- Ahsan Habib Nasim
- Maznun Mizan
- Farhad Limon as a guerilla fighter
- Tiger Robi as the coach of the Shadhin Bangla football team

== Production ==
"For so long we have seen liberation war films as cold mood low budget films. Liberation war films are donation films. Which are not made for the general audience, but for the intellectuals. Damal is a complete exception in this regard. It is a large scale film. With Damal, people all over the world will know how great our liberation war was."

— Raihan Rafi

The pre-production of Damal started in 2018. Rafi described the film as his "dream project". The story of the film is written by Faridur Reza Sagar inspired by true events. In 2018, Rafi was fascinated by reading the story. Despite doubts, he agreed to direct the film. The story was turned into a screenplay by Nazim Ud Daula and its director Raihan Rafi. It took nine months to construct the screenplay of the film that connects the present generation with old by football. The preparation of its production began in August 2020. It was produced on the occasion of the 50th anniversary of Bangladesh. At least 500 actors have been hired to act in this film. Its production became challenging in 2020 due to the COVID-19 pandemic. Its filming started on 25 November 2020. It is the debut film of Samia Othoi where she plays the role of a female footballer. Most of the scenes of the film were shot in Parbatipur and Syedpur of North Bengal. The first lot was filmed for about a month. Due to the COVID-19 pandemic and production complications, the filming was halted and later the filming had to be resumed by increasing the budget. In June–July 2020, Siam Ahmed, Sariful Razz and Sumit Sengupta started training for football. Razz and Siam had to take football training for a total of six months for acting. Completing the production of the film was challenging for Raihan Rafi. Siam, Razz and the director fell ill several times during its filming. Even Rafi was pessimistic about the film's future. He didn't realize that directing a sports film could be so difficult. But its story motivated him to complete the film. The filming ended on 3 June 2021.

== Music ==
Damal

Soundtrack album by Momtaz Begum, Pritom Hasan, Imran Mahmudul, Dilshad Nahar Kona, Shakib Chowdhury, Oyshee, Rezwana Choudhury Bannya
- Released: 2022
- Studio: Studio 58 Production
- Genre: Film music
- Language: Bengali
- Label: Impress Telefilm
- Producer: Arafat Mohsin

Arafat Mohsin chronology
Ice Cream (2016)	Damal (2022)	Surongo (2023)

The film has a total of 4 songs excluding a Tagore song. Its music is directed by Arafat Mohsin Nidhi. The songs are sung by Momtaz Begum, Pritom Hasan, Imran Mahmudul, Dilshad Nahar Kona, Shakib Chowdhury, Oyshee, Rezwana Choudhury Bannya respectively. The lyricist of its songs is Rasel Mahmud. The title track titled "Damal" was produced for the campaign which was scheduled to release on 22 October 2022 but was released on 25 October 2022. This promotional song was not included in the film. The music video of the song was filmed for three consecutive days from 16 October 2022. The song "Ami Durjoy" got positive reaction from viewers.

Damal Soundtrack – Track listing
No.	Title	Lyrics	Singers	Length
1.	"Ghurghur Poka"	Rasel Mahmud	Momtaz Begum	3:56
2.	"Ami Durjoy"	Rasel Mahmud	Pritom Hasan	3:06
3.	"Mon Posh Mane Na"	Rasel Mahmud	Imran Mahmudul and Dilshad Nahar Kona	3:17
4.	"A Tagore Song"	Rabindranath Tagore	Rezwana Choudhury Bannya
5.	"Damal"	Rasel Mahmud	Oyshee and Shakib Chowdhury	2:50

== Marketing ==
To promote Damal, the production team took unique methods. On 13 September 2022, Channel i had a talk show with an unpredictable appearance of its cast. In 28 September, the cast of the film Damal met the Bangladesh women's national football team, winner of the 2022 SAFF Women's Championship, for the campaign. On 11 October 2022, T Sports and Bashundhara Kings became sponsors of the film. The cast also entered a shopping mall and started playing football which attracted the attention of shoppers. In 18 October, the Damal team arrived at the venue of the Oikko-Channel i Music Awards 2022. A song titled "Damal" was recorded as part of the film's promotion, with a music video costing ৳2.5 million. As a novelty promotion, In 22 October, a team of actors from the film Damal played a football match against Bashundhara Kings, a professional football team in Bangladesh, at the Bashundhara Kings Arena in Dhaka. On the day of the film's release, the cast of the film attended the third anniversary function of the "Classroom", a facebook group consists of 2001 SSC batch ex-students, organized at Bashundhara International Convention City. On 4 November 2022, Damal film cast was present at Maulana Bhasani Hockey Stadium to witness the hockey match of Metro Express Barishal vs Monarch Mart Padma as the goodwill ambassador.

== Controversies ==
After the film's trailer was released on YouTube on 16 August 2022, three mistakes were caught. In one scene, the goalkeeper's jersey can be seen with numbers written in English while the rest of the team's jerseys are written in Bengali. The goalkeeper's jersey changes in the next scene. Besides, the weakness in the trailer's VFX can be seen. In response to the criticism of the trailer, director Raihan Rafi said that the jersey was shown differently in two scenes due to the need of the story. However, he admitted the allegation of weakness in VFX and said that it was due to low budget.

Also, after the release of its trailer, a section of viewers objected to the use of Takbir by Razakars as battle cry, according to whom they did not use it during the liberation war. Although its use has been seen in various posters published by them. Pinaki Bhattacharya, a Bangladeshi blogger, claimed on Facebook that director Rafi decided to drop Takbir from the film's dialogues. Reacting to Bhattacharya's claim, another section of the audience got angry and said they would boycott the film if something like this was done. On 19 August 2022, Rafi dismissed the possibility and stated that he had made no such promise to Bhattacharya but told him that he would not satirize Islam in the film. But he said that the use of Takbir as a battle cry by the Razakars during the war of liberation is part of history and he has not distorted history here.

"Damal" title track was praised after its release on 25 October 2022, but after learning that its budget was ৳2.5 million, some doubted whether its budget was actually ৳2.5 million. Regarding this suspicion, director Rafi said that the cost of filming the music video, the remuneration of the people who participated in the music video and the cost of advertisement were all incurred. He claimed that the stars who were not cast in the film were jealous and raised the question. It was also rumored that Impress Telefilm had sold the film's rights of theatrical release to Raihan Rafi, Bidya Sinha Saha Mim and Siam Ahmed. Rafi told Dhaka Mail that he did not know anything about this. But he did not clarify about it.

Also, after the release of the film, there was rumor that audiences of the movie theater was hired while showing the film. Rafi dismissed the rumour.

== Release ==
=== Theatrical ===
The film got no-objection certificate from the Bangladesh Film Censor Board on 8 August 2022. Damal was fixed to be release on 28 October 2022. The day before the film's release, it was revealed that Damal was going to be released in 22 cinemas. The film released in Bangladesh on the scheduled date. The film started showing in three more cinemas from 3 November 2022. It is scheduled to release in Australia and the United States on 18 November 2022.

=== Home media ===
Damal was digitally premiered on iScreen from 16 March 2023.

== Reception ==
=== Critical response ===
Ahsan Kabir of Bdnews24.com referred to the film Damal as "the ultimate emotional movie with a blend of sports and patriotism". According to him, the film has a story of tension, passion and motivation of the Shadhin Bengali football team. Kabir compliments Shariful Raj's playful tenacity here with his crazy performance. He praised Mim's performance as Hasna. He also appreciated the comedy scenes of Munna and Hasna, and Durjoy and his lover here. Along with these, he praised the film's songs and art direction. Calling it "the most mature work Rafi has ever done", Siam Raihan of The Business Post thinks that although the trailer of the film of Raihan Rafi was able to create a hype in the country, it couldn't become successful like his previous film Poran. With an interesting plot, justified entertainment value, relatable themes, great cinematography and best editorial, he rated it 8 out of 10. Also he criticised its sound mixing, dubbing, cartoonish CGI, some poor dialogues and mediocre performance of Intekhab Dinar. But yet he thinks that people must not miss Damal. Pradosh Mitra of The Daily Observer wrote "If you are just any other cinema goer, Damal, the film inspired by the Shadheen Bangla Football team of 1971, will seem almost flawless. But if you are a footballer or have played the game with some passion, the flaws in the movie will be hard to ignore". Mitra, who finds connection of the ending of the film with Escape to Victory, thinks that the film tried to forcefully feed the message of women empowerment. But opined that Damal has great cinematic appeal. Shadique Mahbub Islam of The Financial Express thinks it as the most unfortunate film of 2022 because although it has the potential to be commercially successful, it failed to do that. Calling "too convenient", he criticises its climax. On the review of Bangla Movie database, They Called Damal a brilliant work. Saying all of the songs were charming and the acting of everyone in the movie is great. Also Praising the Cinematography saying It must be the best cinematography on a Bangladeshi Movie so far.

== See also ==
- Jaago (2010 film)
