= Tama Mirza =

Bangladeshi actress

- তমা মির্জা
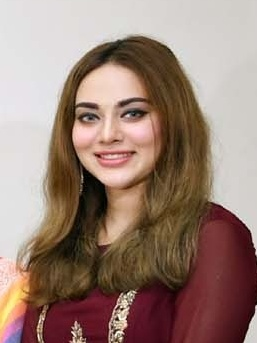
- Mirza in 2021
- Born: Mirza Farjana Yasmin Toma
- Education: Manarat International University
- Occupation: Actress
- Years active: 2010—present
- Spouse: Hisham Chishti (m. 2019; div. 2021)
- Awards: Bangladesh National Film Awards for Best Actress (2015)

Mirza Farjana Yasmin Toma, know popularly as Toma Mirza, is a Bangladeshi film actress and model, recognized for her performances in both mainstream Dhallywood films and web-based digital content. She made her acting debut in 2010 with the film Bolona Tumi Amar. Her breakout role came in Nodijon (2015), for which she won the Bangladesh National Film Award for Best Supporting Actress.

As of 2017, Mirza had acted in 13 films. Mirza is known for her roles in both films and web series, including Game Returns (2017) and Surongo (2023). She also performed in Khachar Bhitor Ochin Pakhi (2021), for which she received multiple awards.

== Education ==
Mirza completed an LLB from Manarat International University in 2023.

== Career ==
=== Web films (2016–2021) ===
She starred in Khachar Bhitor Ochin Pakhi (2021).

Mirza has played leading roles in web series like Friday (2023) and Buker Moddhye Agun (2023).

=== Recent work (2022–present) ===
In 2023, Mirza starred opposite Afran Nisho in Surongo, a thriller directed by Raihan Rafi. The film became a box-office success in Bangladesh and was also released internationally, including in West Bengal and the Middle East. Mirza's performance was widely praised, and the film set new records in the Bangladeshi film industry. Following the success of Suorongo, Mirza signed on to star in another project with director Raihan Rafi, titled Oshiyot.

In 2025, Mirza starred opposite Afran Nisho in the film Daagi, directed by Shihab Shaheen. The film become a box-office success like Surongo.

== Personal life ==
Mirza married Hisham Chishti in 2019. They were divorced in 2021.

== Filmography ==
=== Film ===
Key
†	Denotes films that have not yet been released

Year	Film	Role	Notes	Ref.
2010	Bolo Na Tumi Amar	Moon	Debut film	
2011	Ekbar Bolo Bhalobashi	Alo		
2011	Chotto Songsar	Belly		
2012	O Amar Desher Mati	Mita		
2012	Ek Mon Ek Pran	Jully		
2012	Manik Ratan Dui Bhai	Keya		
2013	Eve Teasing	Kulsoom		
2013	Tomar Majhe Ami	Toma		
2014	Tomar Kache Rini	Toma		
2014	Palabar Poth Nei	Toma		
2015	Nodijon	Chhaya		
2017	Game Returns	Payel		
2017	Ohongkar	Taniya		
2017	Grash	Toma		
2017	Chol Palai	Soniya		
2019	Gohiner Gaan	Toma		
2021	The Dark Side of Dhaka	Shanta	Released on Chorki	
2021	Khachar Bhitor Ochin Pakhi	Pakhi / Reporter Farjana	Released on Chorki	
2022	Anandi	Anandi	Released on Rtv	
2022	Floor Number 7	Pakhi	Released on Chorki	
2022	Cafe Desire	Pia	Released on Chorki	
2023	Friday	Muna	Released on Binge	
2023	Surongo	Moyna		
2025	Daagi	Jerin		
2025	Amalnama	Parveen	Released on Chorki	
2025	Mon Je Bojhena	Lovely	Released after 12 years, filmed in 2013	
2026	Jol Juddho †	TBA	Filming	
2026	Khalnayak †	TBA	Filming	

=== Web series ===
Year	Title	Role	OTT	Ref.
2022	9 April	Rini	Binge	
2023	Buker Moddhye Agun	Sabina	Hoichoi	

== Awards and nominations ==
Year	Award	Category	Work	Result	Ref.
2014	Meril-Prothom Alo Awards	Best Film Actress (critics)	Eve Teasing	Nominated	
2015	Bangladesh National Film Award	Best Supporting Actress	Nodijon	Won	
2022	ICT Channel i Digital Media Award	Best Actress	Khachar Bhitor Ochin Pakhi	Won	
2022	The Daily Star OTT & Digital Content Award	Best Actress (critic's choice)	Khachar Bhitor Ochin Pakhi	Won	
2026	Dhallywood Film and Music Awards	Best Film Actress	Daagi	Won	
2026	Meril Prothom Alo Awards	Best Film Actress	Daagi	Won	
