= Delupi =

- Official poster
- Directed by: Mohammad Touqir Islam
- Written by: Mohammad Touqir Islam
- Screenplay by: Mohammad Touqir Islam; Amit Rudra
- Produced by: Mohammad Touqir Islam; Tanveer Hossain
- Starring: Chiranjit Biswas; Aditi Roy; Rudra Roy; Md. Zakir Hossain
- Cinematography: Mohammad Touqir Islam
- Edited by: Saleh Sobhan Auneem
- Music by: Tapesh Chakraborty
- Production company: Footprint Film Production
- Release date: 14 November 2025
- Country: Bangladesh
- Language: Bengali

Delupi is a 2025 Bangladeshi drama film in the Bengali language. It is written, produced and directed by Mohammad Touqir Islam along with Amit Rudra under the banner of Footprint Film Productions. It stars Chiranjit Biswas, Aditi Roy, Rudra Roy and Zakir Hossain in the lead roles. The film tells the story of river erosion, tidal waves and the struggles of the yatra artists in the south.

Filming began in late September 2024 in Delhi and concluded in late October. Post-production work took place in Dhaka. It is the first feature-length film by director Mohammad Tauqir Islam.

== Cast ==
- Chiranjit Biswas
- Aditi Roy as Nupur
- Rudra Roy as Mihir
- Md. Zakir Hossain
- Palash Kumar Gosh
- Prashanta Roy
- Alpona Bairagi

== Production ==
The film is named Delupi after the Deluti Union in Paikgachha Upazila of Khulna. The story of the film, and most of the characters, are drawn from the people of the union. The film was shot in Deluti Union, Paikgachha Upazila, Khulna.

== Release ==
The film was released on 7 November 2025 at Liberty Cineplex in Khulna and in 6 theaters across the country on 14 November. The film was screened at the Red Lotus Asian Film Festival Vienna on 25 March 2026.

== Reception ==
The Indian filmmaker Anurag Kashyap has praised this film on Letterboxd, he wroted "The film moved me in ways I can't describe". Spondon Tahsan of The Business Standard wrote "The cast is the film's strongest asset of this film".
