= Fereshteh (film) =

2024 Iran-Bangladesh joint production film

- Poster
- Directed by: Morteza Atashzamzam
- Written by: Morteza Atashzamzam; Mumit Al Rashid
- Produced by: Sumon Faruque; Jaya Ahsan
- Starring: Jaya Ahsan; Sumon Faruque; Reekita Nondine Shimu; Shahiduzzaman Selim; Shahed Ali
- Cinematography: Boyraj Fazli
- Edited by: Kavoos Aghaie
- Music by: Foad Hejazi
- Production companies: Imaje Cinema (Iran); Maximum Enterprise (Bangladesh); C te Cinema (Bangladesh)
- Distributed by: Bongo BD
- Release dates: 1 February 2024 (Fajr Film Festival); 19 September 2025 (Bangladesh)
- Countries: Bangladesh; Iran
- Languages: Bengali; Persian

Fereshteh (Persian:دروغ های زیبا transl. Beautiful Lies) is a 2024 Bangladeshi-Iranian joint production drama film. It is directed by Morteza Atashzamzam and written by Dhaka University teacher Mumit Al Rashid. It was co-produced by Sumon Faruque and Jaya Ahsan under the banner of Iran's Imaje Cinema, Bangladesh's Maximum Enterprise and C te Cinema. It stars Jaya Ahsan, Reekita Nondine Shimu, and Suman Faruque in the lead roles. It premiered at the Fajr International Film Festival in Iran on 1 February 2024. The film is about Amjad, a rickshaw puller, who tries to make a better life with the help of his wife Fereshteh. The film won Iran National Film Awards for Best Film.

== Cast ==
- Jaya Ahsan as Fereshteh
- Reekita Nondine Shimu
- Suman Faruque as Amjad
- Shahiduzzaman Selim
- Shahed Ali
- Shaheen Mridha
- Sathi

== Production ==
The film was shot in Dhaka and Gazipur.

== Release ==
It has been screened at several film festivals. It is also known as Beautiful Lies, Durugahaye Ziba, Fereshte, and "CNG".

=== Screened ===
- Goa International Film Festival, 2024
- Fajr International Film Festival, 2024
- Dhaka International Film Festival, 2024
