= Daagi =

2025 Bangladeshi crime thriller film

- Official poster of Daagi
- Directed by: Shihab Shaheen
- Written by: Shihab Shaheen
- Produced by: Shahriar Shakil; Mahendra Soni; Redoan Rony
- Starring: Afran Nisho; Tama Mirza; Sunerah Binte Kamal
- Cinematography: Subhankar Bhar
- Edited by: Jobayer Abir Peal
- Music by: Songs: Sajid Sarker; Arafat Mohsin Score: Arafat Mohsin
- Production companies: Alpha-i; SVF; Chorki
- Distributed by: Chorki (Bangladesh); SVF (India)
- Release date: March 31, 2025
- Running time: 142 minutes
- Country: Bangladesh
- Language: Bengali
- Budget: est.৳3.5 crore
- Box office: ৳16 crore (US$1.3 million)

Daagi (Bengali: দাগি, transl. Stained) is a 2025 Bangladeshi Crime-Drama film directed and written by Shihab Shaheen, his second film as director, and jointly produced by Mahendra Soni, Shahriar Shakil and Redoan Rony under their respective banners SVF, Alpha-i and Chorki. The film stars Afran Nisho in his second theatrical role after Surongo, and also stars Tama Mirza and Sunerah Binte Kamal.

== Plot ==
After spending fifteen years in prison, Nishan is finally free, but his past refuses to let go. Once entangled in the world of smuggling, he returns home only to find that life has moved on without him. As he struggles to rebuild, an old acquaintance resurfaces, drawing him back into the shadows he desperately wanted to leave behind. Caught between redemption and temptation, Nishan finds himself entangled in a dangerous game where old rivalries ignite once again and where buried truths resurface. As he forges unexpected bonds and faces unsettling revelations, he must confront the ghosts of his past to determine if he can truly break free–or if some sins are destined to chase him forever. The story dives into Nishan’s emotional struggle, tracing his search for redemption and meaning after years of loss and regret. It brings together themes of love and misfortune as he tries to come to terms with the pain of his past and the hope of rebuilding his life from scratch.

== Cast ==
- Afran Nisho as Nishan
- Tama Mirza as Jarin
- Sunerah Binte Kamal as Likhon
- Manoj Pramanik as Rasheduzzaman Shohag
- Rashed Mamun Apu as Ravi
- Gazi Rakayet as Nishan's father
- Shahiduzzaman Selim as Ranjith Singh
- Mili Bashar
- Monira Mithu as Shohag's mother
- Lutfur Rahman Khan Shimanto
- Jhuna Chowdhury
- Rajib Saleheen as Babu (Nisho's friend)

== Production ==
In early 2024, Alpha-i Entertainment Ltd. announced a joint venture with Shree Venkatesh Films to launch a production company. As part of this collaboration, Afran Nisho signed a contract for two films, one of which was set to be directed by Shihab Shaheen, marking his second directorial film. On October 21, 2024, the film was officially registered as Daagi with the Bangladesh Film Directors' Association, making it Nisho's second feature film. The film was officially announced on December 8, coinciding with Nisho's birthday.

Filming began in Saidpur, Nilphamari on December 23, 2024. Afran Nisho took part in the first day's shoot, joined by the two lead actresses. The film was shot in multiple locations across Bangladesh, including Saidpur in Nilphamari, Panchagarh, Rajshahi, Barisal, Manikganj, Gazipur, and various parts of Dhaka. After nearly two months and five days of shooting, the filming wrapped up on February 25, 2025.

== Music ==
Daagi

Soundtrack album by Sajid Sarkar
- Studios: SVF; Chorki
- Labels: SVF; Chorki
- Producer: Sajid Sarkar

Sajid Sarkar chronology
Rajkumar (2024)	Daagi (2025)	TBA (TBA)

Singles from Daagi
- 1. "Ektukhani Mon" Released: March 20, 2025; 2. "Daagi" Released: March 26, 2025

The film's soundtrack was composed by Sajid Sarker, reuniting with director Shihab Shaheen after a decade, following their last collaboration on Chuye Dile Mon (2015). The first song, Ektukhani Mon, was released on March 20, 2025. It was penned by poet and novelist Sadat Hossain and performed by Tahsan Rahman Khan and Masha Islam. Afran Nisho made his playback debut with the title track, a duet with Arafat Mohsin, released on March 26, coinciding with Independence Day. The song was composed by Arafat Mohsin himself and penned by Rasel Mahmud.

Tracklist
No.	Title	Writer(s)	Singer(s)	Length
1.	"Ektukhani Mon"		Tahsan Rahman Khan and Masha Islam	1:59
2.	"Daagi"	Rasel Mahmud	Arafat Mohsin, Afran Nisho	2:00

== Marketing ==
On March 11, 2025, a 1-minute and 7-second teaser of the film was released, featuring Afran Nisho in three different looks. On March 24, 2025, the film received a "U" certificate from the Bangladesh Film Certification Board. On March 27 2025, Filmmakers did a press conference and Afran Nisho took an entry like a prisoner, handcuffed with some police, on the same date Trailer was launched.

== Release ==
The film was released in theaters on Eid ul-Fitr, 2025.

On April 8, 2025, a special screening of the film was held at Star Cineplex in Center Point Shopping Mall. During the event, a one-minute silence was observed as a silent protest against the Israeli invasion of Gaza. The screening was attended by artists' of the Bangladeshi film industry.

== Reception ==
=== Box office ===
Daagi grossed over ৳7.6 crore (US$620,000), as confirmed by one of the film's producers, Shahriar Shakil, through a statement on social media.

=== Critical response ===
Latiful Haque of Prothom Alo rated Daagi as one of the finest recent Bangla films, praising its raw emotion, layered screenplay, and Afran Nisho's powerful performance and climax action sequence. A gripping rural drama elevated by strong direction and memorable dialogue.

== Awards ==
Year	Award	Category	Winner	Result	Ref.
2026	Dhallywood Film and Music Awards	Best Film Actress	Tama Mirza	Won	
2026	Dhallywood Film and Music Awards	Best Film Actor (critics' choice)	Afran Nisho	Won	
2026	Dhallywood Film and Music Awards	Best Supporting Actress (critics' choice)	Monira Mithu	Won	
2026	Meril-Prothom Alo Awards	Best Film	—N/a	Nominated	
2026	Meril-Prothom Alo Awards	Best Film Actor	Afran Nisho	Won	
2026	Meril-Prothom Alo Awards	Best Film Actress	Tama Mirza	Won	
