= Surongo =

2023 Bangladeshi crime thriller film

- Theatrical release poster
- Directed by: Raihan Rafi
- Screenplay by: Nazim Ud Daula; Raihan Rafi
- Story by: Raihan Rafi
- Produced by: Shahriar Shakil; Redoan Rony
- Starring: Afran Nisho; Toma Mirza
- Cinematography: Sumon Sarker
- Edited by: Sumit Ray Antor
- Music by: Arafat Mohsin; Sajid Sarker; Emon Chowdhury
- Production companies: Alpha-i; Chorki
- Distributed by: Shree Venkatesh Films; The Content Specialists; Bioskope Films; Bongoz Films
- Release date: 29 June 2023 (Bangladesh)
- Running time: 150 mins
- Country: Bangladesh
- Language: Bengali
- Budget: est. ৳2 crore (US$160,000)
- Box office: est. ৳15 crore (US$1.2 million)

Surongo (Bengali: সুড়ঙ্গ, transl. Tunnel) is a 2023 Bangladeshi thriller film directed by Raihan Rafi and produced by Alpha-i and Chorki. The film features Afran Nisho and Tama Mirza as lead roles. It is mark the debut film of Afran Nisho on the big screen.

Surongo was released on 29 June 2023, during the Eid al-Adha festival in Bangladesh. It received positive reviews from critics with praise for the cast performances specially Afran Nisho, Cinematography, music, direction and the story's emotional depth and dark tone. The film became a box office success as blockbluster. It stands as the second highest grossing Bangladeshi film of 2023. A sequel, titled Surongo 2 is slated for release in December 2026.

== Plot ==
Masud, an electrician, falls in love with Moyna after seeing her one day while repairing a street lamp. They meet again when Masud is called to fix Moyna's fridge, after which they start dating. Masud and Moyna marry. Masud finds a job in Malaysia to support his new family. While he is away, Moyna receives gifts from her friend Jahir and begins an affair with him. Eventually, Moyna leaves Masud and runs away with Jahir. However, after eloping with him, she discovers that he is already married. Meanwhile, Masud returns to Bangladesh to find that the chairman of his union council has repossessed his home because he could not repay the wedding loan. He searches for Moyna and Jahir and eventually finds them. Masud works as an ice breaker and a mine worker, but these jobs do not earn him enough money. Consequently, he spends nine months digging an underground tunnel to steal money from a bank. After completing the tunnel, he steals 340 million Bangladeshi taka and tells his ex-wife about it during a video call. The police offer a reward of 500,000 taka for information leading to the thief's capture, and Moyna informs on him. After being imprisoned, Masud escapes by digging a tunnel and sets fire to Moyna in an act of revenge.

== Cast ==
- Afran Nisho as Masud
- Toma Mirza as Moyna
- Mostafa Monwar as Jahir (Masud's friend)
- Shahiduzzaman Selim as Apel Khan (the chief investigating officer)
- Ashoke Bepari as the bank manager
- Monir Ahmed Shakeel as the bank manager's driver
- Nusraat Faria as the item number dancer

== Production ==
The story of 'Surongo' is really special to me. I wanted to direct this movie for a long time but I had some limitations as I couldn't make it without the help of strong producers. Fortunately, I now have two big producers who understand my vision properly.

— Raihan Rafi to The Daily Star

Before Surongo, television actor Afran Nisho did not act in any films due to them not having a clear and polished plot. Towards the end of 2022, he slowly started to not appear in various TV dramas and web series, leading to rumors that he was preparing to make his film debut. It was reported that an official announcement about the film would be made on 12 December of the same year, and the filming would begin the following year. On 28 February 2023, there was an inauguration ceremony of the film. Raihan Rafi wanted to finish filming, as that was his highest priority at the time.

The filming began on 4 March, and was scheduled to be completed in three phases. The first phase was filmed for ten days in Sunamganj District near the Bangladesh–India border. For the second phase, the production team of 200 members went to Chittagong Division. In the last phase, some scenes were shot in Dhaka. Toma Mirza, the actress for Moyna, had to take a long break to act in this film, even though she had not signed up for any other TV dramas or films well before Surongo's production. It is the first Bangladeshi film to be filmed using the Alexa Mini LR camera. As of May 2023, its post-production was underway. Its color grading is done in India, and post production was scheduled to be completed by 20 June.

== Music ==
Surongo

Soundtrack album by Arafat Mohsin, Sajid Sarker and Emon Chowdhury
- Released: 2023
- Genre: Film soundtrack
- Language: Bengali
- Producers: Arafat Mohsin; Sajid Sarker; Emon Chowdhury

Arafat Mohsin chronology
Damal (2022)	Surongo (2023)	Toofan (2024)

Sajid Sarker chronology
Networker Baire (2021)	Surongo (2023)	Priyotoma (2023)

Emon Chowdhury chronology
Hawa (2022)	Surongo (2023)

Singles from Surongo
- 1. "O Taka Tui Amar Kolija Ar Jaan" Released: 12 June 2023; 2. "Gaa Chuye Bol (duet)" Released: 28 June 2023; 3. "Dhukkur Pukur" Released: 27 August 2023

The film soundtrack was composed by Arafat Mohsin, Sajid Sarker, and Emon Chowdhury. The first song of the film, titled "O Taka Tui Amar Kolija Ar Jaan", was sung by Dilshad Nahar Kona, written by Rasel Mahmud, and composed by Arafat Mohsin. The song was published on 12 June 2023, on Chorki's official YouTube channel. Rafi wanted to have an item song in the film, offering Nusraat Faria to star in it. Two weeks later, she agreed. After a week of rehearsals, the item song was filmed over four days in Dhaka, where Nusrat was accompanied by four hundred dancers. After watching the music video, many found it similar to "Oo Antava Oo Oo Antava" from Pushpa: The Rise. Resemblances of Samantha Ruth Prabhu to Nusraat Faria were allegedly found in the music video. The film marked the film debut of its lyricist and composer Tanjib Sarowar, with the title track "Gaa Chuye Bol". He and Abanti Sithi are the singers.

Track listing
No.	Title	Lyrics	Music	Singer(s)	Length
1.	"O Taka Tui Amar Kolija Ar Jaan"	Rasel Mahmud	Arafat Mohsin	Dilshad Nahar Kona	3:30
2.	"Gaa Chuye Bol (duet)"	Tanjib Sarowar	Sajid Sarker	Tanjib Sarowar, Abanti Sithi	2:46
3.	"Gaa Chuye Bol (solo)"	Tanjib Sarowar	Sajid Sarker	Tanjib Sarowar
4.	"Gaa Chuye Bol (sad version)"	Tanjib Sarowar	Sajid Sarker	Rehaan Rasul
5.	"Dhukkur Pukkur"	Rasel Mahmud	Emon Chowdhury	Abanti Sithi, Emon Chowdhury	4:03

== Release ==
=== Distribution ===
As of March 2023, before the production team had finished filming, Bioskope Films bought the distribution rights for its release in North America. In June 2023, with Shree Venkatesh Films (SVF) promoting the film in India, it had become the distributor of the film in West Bengal. On the other hand, Shahriar Shakil, one of the producers of the film, did not clarify this matter, but said that they were trying to release the film in the Indian state. Surongo was passed for uncut censor certificate by the Bangladesh Film Censor Board on 18 June 2023. Australian distributor Bongoz Films announced the release of the film across the country on 7 July. On 23 June, SVF officially announced that the film is going to be released in West Bengal.

=== Theatrical ===
It was scheduled to be released on Eid al-Adha of the same year (29 June 2023) in Bangladesh. Rafi stated that like his previous films, he wanted to release it in a small number of movie theaters first. On 26 June 2023, it was announced that the film will be domestically released in 28 movie theaters, and it was released on the scheduled day. Its number of shows in multiplexes went from 9–18 on the day after its release in Bangladesh. Rafi announced after the film's release in Bangladesh that Surongo will be released on 21 July in Canada and New York City, and on 28 July across the United States. He also informed that there are plans to release the film in the Middle East. All tickets for 12 of the 37 shows in Australia were sold out in advance before the scheduled release date. On 7 July 2023, the number of movie theaters showing it in Bangladesh remained unchanged, but seven shows stopped showing the film. It was released in 31 Indian movie theaters on 21 July 2023. Also from this day, the movie theaters in Bangladesh showing the film was increased by 22. It is scheduled to release in New Zealand on 30 July 2023. As of 22 July 2023, it is showing in 16 movie theaters in Australia.

==== Piracy ====
After release, some reviewers recorded scenes with their phones and posted them to the Internet. Hall prints of the film were uploaded online and at least 400 recorded videos were removed from Facebook and YouTube in an effort by Chorki authority to curb piracy. The reason for the film's piracy was its editor's statement that its video was leaked from a movie theater in Bangladesh. The movie was recorded in a movie theater from a time when there was no audience. From here it became clear that some unknown person related to the movie theater was involved in piracy. Raihan Rafi went to the office of Detective Branch to discuss the prevention of online piracy. It was then learned that the film's production team had lodged a complaint with the police to prevent piracy. Five persons were named as perpetrators in the complaint. According to Jaaz Multimedia, due to online piracy, the producers of Surongo may lose ৳1 crore. According to filmmaker Abdul Aziz, the film was leaked because its distribution was handed over to The Content Specialists, whose distribution servers did not have adequate security measures in place. On 28 July 2023, Harun Ur Rashid, chief of the Detective Branch, assured that action would be taken against those involved in piracy. On the same day Raihan Rafi warned everyone that whoever uploads the footage of the film on the internet will be arrested under the existing law. He called on all those who uploaded its footages to delete it. Two days later, two people were arrested for piracy.

=== Home media ===
Surongo was digitally premiered in Bangladesh through Chorki on 24 August 2023.

== Reception ==
=== Audience ===
Ticket sales for its shows at the mini theater Roots Cineclub in Sirajganj had 90% tickets sold by 18 June. Due to increasing demand, the mini theater organized a special screening of the film on 1 July at 1:00 am for the audience. According to the entertainment reporter's news article published by Ajker Patrika on 2 July, Priyotoma and Surongo are in the highest demand during the Eid-ul-Azha season of 2023. Since there is no movie theater in Afran Nisho's native Bhuapur Upazila, his fans have rented the Shadhinata Complex auditorium and set up a makeshift movie theater there to watch the film for a week. As of 3 July 2023, the temporary movie theater was set up with the help of the municipal authority at a cost of ৳0.3 million, and is running 4 shows of the film with at least 700 tickets being sold daily.

=== Critical response ===
Filmmaker and writer Sadat Hossain wrote that the film making was "wonderful" and made "the traditional story unique". However, according to Hossain, its dialogue could have been better and the film did not need an item number. Kudrat Ullah from RTV praised the film's story and Nisho's performance. Film critic Ahsan Kabir gave Surongo 6.5/10, and writes in Bangla Tribune that the film is actually a different version of Raihan Rafi's "Poran". According to him, in this story, both Masud and Moyna are wrong, but only Moyna's fault is highlighted here. Kabir stated that the scenes in the film are exciting and enjoyable enough. He also noted inconsistencies in the bank robbery scene and the lack of escape from the prison scene. Rodela Neela of Bdnews24.com praised its cinematography and color grading, but she criticized it for underplaying the characters associated with the bank after the interval. Hasib Ur Rashid Ifti of The Daily Star criticized the film's background music, sound mixing, and editing, but said that Surongo's climax would make audiences forget its weaknesses. Critic Masuda Bhatti pointed out the film was a risk taken by producing it in the current plight of the cinema of Bangladesh, which has succeeded. Shuvodip Biswas of The Financial Express praised its unpredictable story without plotholes. According to him, the presentation of the Seven Deadly Sins in the film made it a commercial success. However, he criticizes that the film's portrayal of women in a negative way and how the use of violence may send the wrong message to the society. According to Muhammad Altamish Nabil of Banglanews24.com, Rafi made the film a commercial success using his usual formula. According to the reviewer, someone more suitable could have been cast in the role of Zahir. Shuparno Rahman of Prothom Alo wrote that its songs gave the movie atmosphere and praised the initiative of the film. According to Saqlain Rizve of The Business Standard, Surongo is a "slow-paced film with breathtaking visuals". According to Faruque Ratul of Dhaka Tribune, the plot of the film is unpredictable but the script is not good. He also said that its plotholes left him clueless.

Sanchari Kar of News18 Bangla appreciated the step-by-step character development of Nisho's character Masud in the film. According to her "pure entertainment and good acting are the treasures of 'Surongo'". According to Nirmal Dhar of Sangbad Pratidin, there is nothing new in the film and the screenplay is unnecessarily drawn out. According to him the performances of its actors were good but it is a purely commercial film and it is not possible for Surongo to surpass the popularity of the film "Hawa", another Bangladeshi film released in West Bengal. Poorna Banerjee of The Times of India gave it 3/5.

=== Box office ===
As of 6 July 2023, the film has earned a total of around ৳2.5 crore from the multiplexes of Star Cineplex in Bangladesh. As of 9 July 2023, a total of ৳38 lakh tickets have been sold from the shows of Surongo at Lion Cinemas. After 2 weeks the film have grossed a total of ৳4.45 crore. From 21 to 26 July, it grossed only ₹0.8 million in India. It earned total of ৳15 crore.

== Controversies ==
Prarthana Fardin Dighi claimed in December 2022 that she was signed to cast in the film in June of the same year, but the director replaced her with Toma Mirza. Dighi alleged that she is the victim of syndicate that runs the film industry. Rafi denied her allegation, stating that there was no written agreement with her in this regard, but only oral discussions. He did not sign Dighi, as she did not feel suitable for the film role. In response, Dighi claimed that she had proof of her claims.

Its first look video was released on 10 May 2023, where Afran Nisho is seen entering a tunnel. From this scene, some viewers thought that the film was based on the 2014 incident in which a robber tunneled into a Kishoreganj bank. When Rafi was asked about this, he did not give any clear answers. An official trailer was released on YouTube for promoting the film, but there were rumors that the background music used in the trailer was plagiarized. In response to this controversy, Rafi stated that the license to use the music was purchased by Alpha-i.

After its release in Bangladesh, a section of the audience criticized the adult scenes in the film. According to them, the scenes did not suit the culture of Bangladesh. In response to the situation, Rafi said that some scenes were kept in the film for the plot to be consistent, and it was given uncut certificates from the Censor Board, as the scenes were not objectionable.

== Sequel ==
On 8 July 2023, Redoan Rony told reporters that it takes a lot of time to produce a film, and that there must a plot to make a sequel of Surongo. In 2025 Nisho reprised the character of Masud in Rafi's film Taandob, thus forming Raihan Rafi's Cinematic Universe.

On 12 June 2026, the producers announced Surongo 2, confirming the return of Nisho as Masud, the release being scheduled for December 2026.

== Awards ==
Year	Award	Category	Name	Result	Ref.
2024	Meril-Prothom Alo Awards	Best Popular Choice	Afran Nisho	Won	
2026	Bangladesh National Film Awards 2023	Best Film Actor	Afran Nisho	Won	
2026	Bangladesh National Film Awards 2023	Best Supporting Actor	Monir Ahmed Shakeel	Won	
2026	Bangladesh National Film Awards 2023	Best Comedian	Shahiduzzaman Selim	Won	
2026	Bangladesh National Film Awards 2023	Best Playback Singer	Abanti Sithi	Won	
2026	Bangladesh National Film Awards 2023	Best Screenplay Writer	Raihan Rafi and Nazim Ud Daula	Won	
2026	Bangladesh National Film Awards 2023	Best Art Director	Shahidul Islam	Won	
2026	Bangladesh National Film Awards 2023	Best Cinematographer	Suman Sarker	Won	
2026	Bangladesh National Film Awards 2023	Best Costume and Makeup Artist	Bithi Afreen	Won	
