= Afran Nisho =

Bangladeshi film actor, television personality, story writer and playback singer

- আফরান নিশো
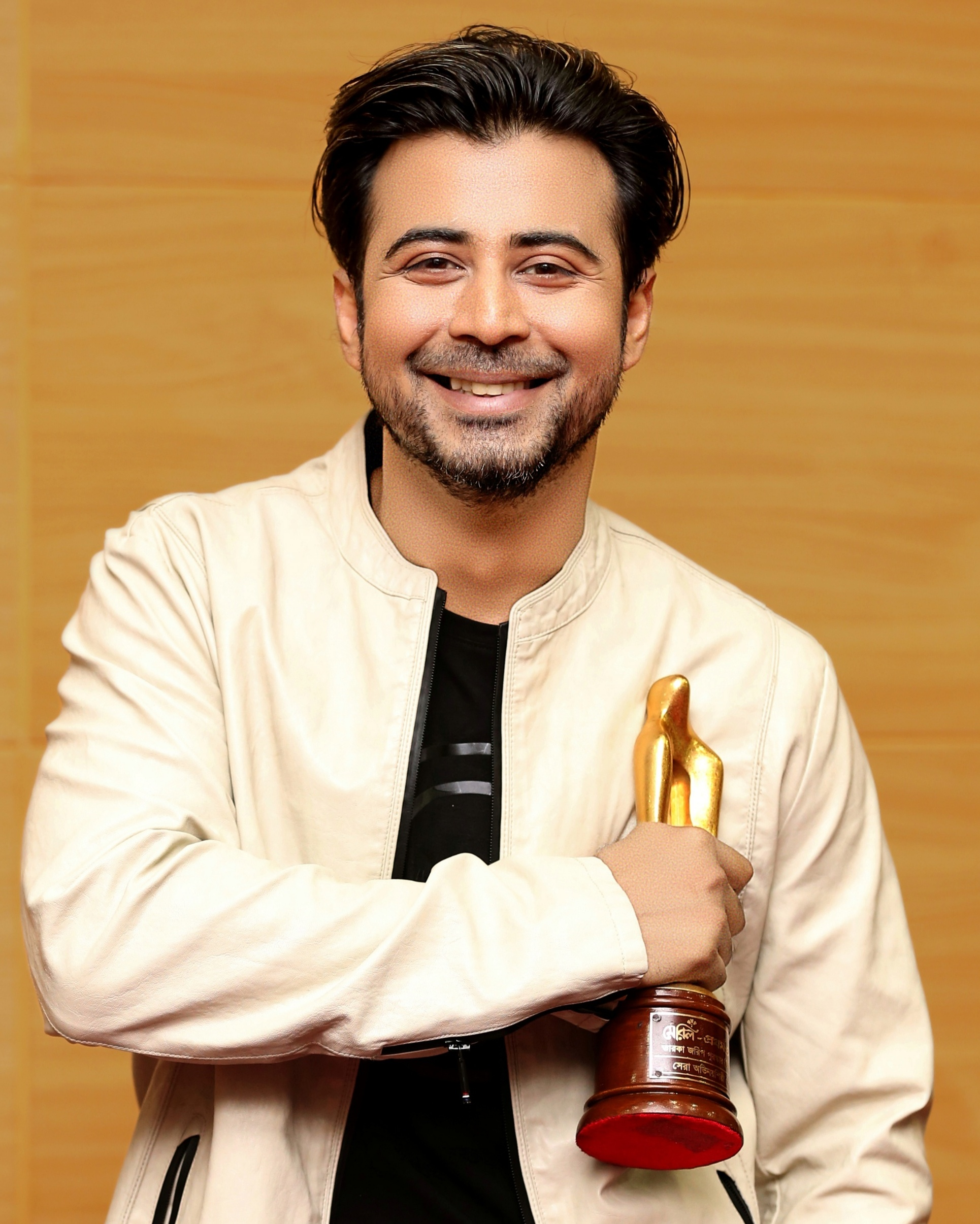
- Nisho in 2019
- Born: Ahammed Fazle Rabbi; 8 December 1980 (age 45); Bhuapur, Tangail, Bangladesh
- Education: Dhanmondi Government Boys' High School, Dhaka; Dhaka College; East West University, Dhaka
- Occupations: Film Actor; television personality; story writer; playback singer
- Years active: 2003–present
- Spouse: Trisha (m. 2011)
- Children: 1

Ahammed Fazle Rabbi (born 8 December 1980), known popularly as Afran Nisho, is a Bangladeshi actor, story writer, and playback singer. He won a Meril Prothom Alo Award for critics' choice Best TV Actor for his role in the TV drama Jog Biyog in 2016, and he wrote the story and singing debut for director Kajal Arefin Ome's TV drama Muthophone (2019).

He won first time the Bangladesh National Film Awards in the Best Film Actor category for his performance in the film Surongo (2023). He also won Meril Prothom Alo Awards for Best TV Actor for his role in Punorjonmo (2021). He made his debut in film as a lead in Surongo (2023) directed by Raihan Rafi.

== Personal life ==
Nisho was born in Bhuapur, Tangail, Bangladesh, on 8 December 1980. He married Trisha in 2011, and they have one child.

== Career ==
Nisho began his career as a model in a television commercial in 2003. Nisho has worked in countless TV dramas, telefilms, and TV series and has done around 850+ TV works for countless TV channels. He has worked with celebrities such as Mehazabien Chowdhury, Tanjin Tisha, Aupee Karim, Ziaul Faruq Apurba, Tahsan Rahman Khan, Chanchal Chowdhury, Tasnia Farin, Nusrat Imrose Tisha, and many more. He has worked in countless adverts before entering in as an actor. TVCs such as AKTEL goon goon and pre-paid, Gazi Tyres etc.

In 2023, Nisho made his debut in the Bangladeshi film industry with Raihan Rafi's crime thriller Surongo, which received generally positive reviews and became a major commercial success at the box office. Following a brief hiatus, he reunited with Alpha-i, Chorki, and SVF in Shihab Shaheen's crime drama Daagi in 2025.

== Filmography ==
=== Films ===
Key
†	Denotes films that have not yet been released

Year	Film	Role	Notes	Ref.
2023	Surongo	Masud	Debut film	
2025	Daagi	Mushfiqur Rahim "Nishan"	Also singer of the "Daagi" title track	
2025	Taandob	Masud	Special appearance	
2026	Domm: Until The Last Breath	Shahjahan Islam Noor		
2027	Surongo 2 †	Masud	Post-production	
2027	Pulsirat †	TBA	Filming	
2027	Khalnayak †	TBA	Filming	
2027	Opolok †	TBA	Filming	

=== Web film ===
Year	Film	Role	Notes	Ref.
2018	Chor	Faruk	Short film on Iflix	
2018	Bra-ther	Ratul	Short film on Iflix	
2019	Ditiyo Koishor	Rio Reiser	Released on Bioscope	
2020	Mainkar Chipay	Police Officer	Released on ZEE5	
2022	Redrum	CID Officer ADC. Rashed Chowdhary	Released on Chorki	
2022	Shon Shon	Shohag	Released on Binge	
2022	Shuklopokkho	Rafsan Haque	Released on Chorki	
2023	Neel Joler Kabbo	Shawon	Released on iScreen	

== Web series ==
Key
†	Denotes films that have not yet been released

Year	Title	Role	OTT	Director	Ref.
2017	Ami Cricketer Hote Chai	Pappu "Bhai"	YouTube	Mabrur Rashid Bannah	
2019	Beauty and The Bullet	Rasel	Bioscope	Animesh Aich	
2021	Morichika	Salam Sharif	Chorki	Shihab Shaheen	
2022	Kaiser	ADC Kaiser Chowdhury	Hoichoi	Tanim Noor	
2022	Syndicate	Adnan	Chorki	Shihab Shaheen	
2023	Sharey Showlo	Ashfaq Reza	Hoichoi	Yasir Al Haq	
2025	AKA	Abul Kalam Azad "AKA"	Hoichoi	Vicky Zahed	

== Awards and nominations ==
Year	Awards	Category	Work	Results	Ref.
2017	Meril-Prothom Alo Awards	Best TV Actor (critics' choice)	Jog Biyog	Won	
2019	Meril-Prothom Alo Awards	Best TV Actor	Buker Ba Pashe	Won	
2020	CJFB Performance Award	Best TV Actor	Sheshta Sundor	Won	
2021	Blender's Choice-The Daily Star OTT & Digital Content Awards	Best Actor in Negative Role (popular category)	Morichika	Won	
2022	Meril-Prothom Alo Awards	Best TV Actor	Punorjonmo	Won	
2023	Blender's Choice-The Daily Star OTT & Digital Content Awards	Best OTT Actor	Redrum	Won	
2023	Blender's Choice-The Daily Star OTT & Digital Content Awards	Best OTT Actor	Kaiser	Nominated	
2024	Meril-Prothom Alo Awards	Best TV Actor (popular category)	Punorjonmo	Won	
2024	Meril-Prothom Alo Awards	Best Actor (popular category)	Surongo	Won	
2025	BIFA Awards	Best Film Actor	Daagi	Won	
2026	Dhallywood Film and Music Awards	Best Film Actor (critics' choice)	Daagi	Won	
2026	Bangladesh National Film Awards	Best Film Actor	Surongo	Won	
2026	Meril-Prothom Alo Awards	Best Film Actor	Daagi	Won	
2026	BIFA Awards	Best OTT Actor	AKA	Nominated	
2026	BIFA Awards	Best Film Actor (popular category)	Domm: Until The Last Breath	Won	
2026	Meril-Prothom Alo Awards	Best Film Actor	Domm: Until The Last Breath	Nominated	
2026	Blender's Choice-The Daily Star OTT & Digital Content Awards	Best Actor (popular category)	AKA	Won	
