= Raihan Rafi =

Bangladeshi film director, screenwriter and producer

- রায়হান রাফি
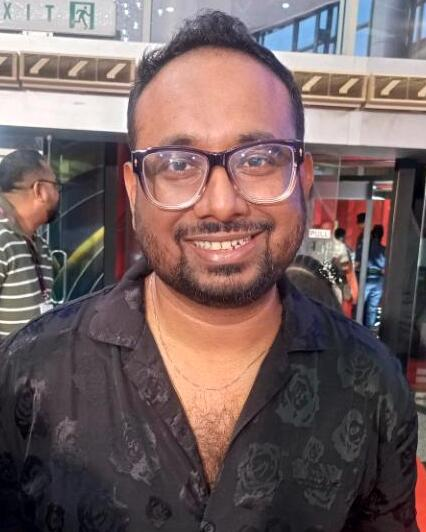
- Rafi in 2025
- Born: Rafi; Sylhet, Bangladesh
- Occupations: Director; scriptwriter; producer
- Years active: 2015–present
- Organization: Kanon Films
- Notable work: Poramon 2, Surongo, Poran, Toofan, Taandob

Raihan Rafi (Bengali: রায়হান রাফি) is a Bangladeshi film director, screenwriter and producer. He is best known for his directorial debut, Poramon 2 (2018) produced by Abdul Aziz and under the banner of Jaaz Multimedia. The film won awards in three categories at Meril Prothom Alo Awards for Best Actor, Best Actress, and Best Singer.

He won Blender's Choice The Daily Star Awards for Best Screenwriter for the film Khachar Bhitor Ochin Pakhi (2021) released on streaming platform Chorki and in 2026, he won the 2023 48th Bangladesh National Film Awards for Best Screenplay Writer in the film Surongo (2023), he received the award jointly with Nazim Ud Daula.

== Career ==
He began his film career in 2018 with Poramon2 and Dahan. In 2021, his first web film, Janowar, was released. Many of his works fall into the same continuity, which has been called the "Raihan Rafi Cinematic Universe".

== Filmography ==
=== Films ===
Key
†	Denotes films that have not yet been released

Year	Film	Director	Screenplay	Story	Note	Ref.
2018	Poramon 2	Yes	Yes	No	Debut film as director	
2018	Dahan	Yes	Yes	Yes		
2022	Poran	Yes	Yes	No		
2022	Damal	Yes	Yes	No		
2023	Surongo	Yes	Yes	Yes		
2024	Toofan	Yes	Yes	Yes		
2025	Taandob	Yes	Yes	Yes		
2026	Pressure Cooker	Yes	Yes	Yes	Also as producer	
2026	Surongo 2 †	Yes	Yes	Yes	Post-production	
2026	Andhar †	Yes	No	No	Completed	
2026	Eyes †	Yes	No	No	Filming	

=== Streaming films ===
Year	Film	Director	Screenplay	Story	Notes	Ref.
2020	Janowar	Yes	Yes	Yes	First Webfilm on Cinematic	
2021	The Dark Side of Dhaka	Yes	Yes	Yes	Webfilm on iTheatre	
2021	Khachar Bhitor Ochin Pakhi	Yes	Yes	Yes	Webfilm on Chorki	
2022	Taan	Yes	Yes	Yes	Webfilm on Chorki	
2022	Floor Number 7	Yes	Yes	Yes	Webfilm on Chorki	
2022	Nishwas	Yes	Yes	Yes	Webfilm on Chorki	
2023	Friday	Yes	Yes	Yes	Webfilm on Binge; Also co-producer	
2024	Mayaa	Yes	Yes	Yes	Webfilm on Binge; Also co-producer	
2025	Amalnama	Yes	No	Yes	Webfilm on Chorki	
2025	Noor	Yes	No	Yes	Released on Bioscope+	
2025	Omimangshito	Yes	Yes	Yes	Released on iScreen	

=== Web series ===
Year	Series	Director	Screenplay	Story	Notes	Ref.
2025	Black Money	Yes	Yes	Yes	First Web series on Bongo	

=== Short films ===
Year	Film	Director	Story	Producer	Note	Ref.
2016	Janer Desh Bangladesh	Yes	Yes	Yes		
2016	Ajob Baksho	Yes	Yes	Yes		
2016	The Story Of Ratan	Yes	Yes	Yes		
2016	Digital Movie and Theater	Yes	Yes	No	Produced by Jaaz Multimedia	
2017	Zahir	Yes	Yes	Yes		
2018	Agami	Yes	Yes	Yes		
2019	3 Minute 5 Taka	Yes	Yes	No		
2019	Nirbak	Yes	Yes	No		
2019	Arranged Marriage 2	Yes	Yes	No		
2019	Projapotir Bhalobasha	Yes	Yes	No		
2019	Sacrifice	Yes	Yes	No		
2019	Chithi	Yes	Yes	No		
2020	Connection	Yes	Yes	No		
2020	Oxygen	Yes	Yes	No		
2021	Eida Kopal	Yes	Yes	No		

== Awards ==
Year	Award	Category	Film	Result	Ref.
2022	Blender's Choice–The Daily Star Awards	Best Screenwriter	Khachar Bhitor Ochin Pakhi	Won	
2023	BFDA Awards	Best Film Director	Poran	Won	
2025	BIFA Awards	Best Film Director	Toofan	Won	
2026	Dhallywood Film and Music Awards	Popular Film Director	Taandob	Won	
2026	National Film Award	Best Screenplay Writer (jointly with Nazim Ud Daula)	Surongo	Won	
