= 26th Meril-Prothom Alo Awards =

2025 Bangladeshi entertainment award ceremony

- Awarded for: Artistic excellence in film, television, music, and digital media
- Awarded by: Prothom Alo; Square Toiletries Ltd.
- Date: May 23, 2025
- Site: Hall of Fame, Bangladesh China Friendship Conference Center, Dhaka
- Hosted by: Afran Nisho; Tasnia Farin
- Directed by: Kabir Bakul
- Official website: Official website

Highlights
- Best Film: Jury's choice: Priyo Maloti
- Best Actor: Shakib Khan; Toofan
- Best Actress: Mehazabien Chowdhury; Priyo Maloti
- Lifetime achievement: Abul Hayat
- Most nominations: Kacher Manush Dure Thuiya (5)

Television coverage
- Channel: Maasranga Television

The 26th Meril-Prothom Alo Awards ceremony was held on 23 May 2025 at the Bangladesh China Friendship Conference Center in Dhaka, Bangladesh. Organized annually by the leading Bangladeshi newspaper Prothom Alo, in association with Square Toiletries Ltd., the awards are considered one of the most prestigious accolades in the country’s entertainment industry. The event celebrates artistic excellence in film, television, music, and digital media, recognizing works from the previous calendar year through popular vote and critics’ selection.

The 2025 edition honored achievements from 2024, with over 20 awards presented across various categories. A major highlight of the ceremony was the Lifetime Achievement Award, which was conferred on veteran actor Abul Hayat for his contributions to the performing arts over five decades.

Shakib Khan was a central figure at the ceremony, winning the Best Actor in popular choice award for his performance in the film Toofan (2024). In addition, he was honored with a special award marking 25 years of his contribution to Bangladeshi cinema, accompanied by a documentary tribute titled "Megastar Shakib Khan", chronicling his journey and impact on the industry.

Other major winners included Mamnun Hasan Emon, who won Best Actor in critics' choice for Mayaa (2024), and Mehazabien Chowdhury, who achieved a rare double by winning both the Best Actress in popular and critics' choice awards for her performance in Priyo Maloti (2024). Mosharraf Karim also received critical recognition for his performance in Adhunik Bangla Hotel. The Best Web Series award went to Rongila Kitab, directed by Anam Biswas, while Nuhash Humayun won Best Director (OTT) for Dui Shaw. Farrukh Ahmed Rehan was named Best Newcomer for his performance in Jugal.

The event was co-hosted by actors Afran Nisho and Tasnia Farin, both making their hosting debut. The ceremony featured musical and dramatic performances and was broadcast live on Maasranga Television, with additional streaming available on the official Facebook and YouTube channels of Meril, Prothom Alo, and Maasranga. The event garnered widespread public and media attention, reinforcing the Meril-Prothom Alo Awards as a cornerstone of cultural recognition in Bangladesh.

== Background ==
The 26th Meril-Prothom Alo Awards ceremony featured a series of musical and dance performances celebrating the year’s achievements in entertainment. The event opened with a colorful dance sequence performed by Tama Mirza, Mandira Chakraborty, and Hridi Sheikh, choreographed by Ivan Shahriar Sohag and accompanied by music from Binod Roy. Sohag Dance Group handled the stage choreography.

A themed performance titled "Dushtu Kokil" included appearances by Bidya Sinha Saha Mim, Dilshad Nahar Kona, and Farrukh Ahmed Rehan, also choreographed by Sohag Dance Group.

The segment "TikTok TikTok" featured actors Tawsif Mahbub, Irfan Sajjad, Mumtaheena Toya, Prarthana Fardin Dighi, Dola Rahman, and Twink Kerala, performed and choreographed by Eagle Dance Group.

A major highlight was the tribute segment "Shakib Khan's Silver Jubilee", celebrating 25 years of the Shakib Khan's career. It featured performances to hit tracks from O Priyotoma, Rajkumar, Dil Dil Dil, and Toofan Theme, with participation by Mamnun Hasan Emon, Nirab Hossain, Ziaul Roshan, Puja Cherry, and Shakib Khan himself. Veteran singers Balam, Dilshad Nahar Kona, Imran Mahmudul, and Arif Rahman Joy contributed vocals, while Eagle Dance Group managed choreography and staging.

The finale "Laage Ura Dhura", performed by Pritom Hasan and choreographed by Eagle Dance Group, closed the evening.

The venue for the event was the Hall of Fame at the Bangladesh China Friendship Conference Center in Dhaka. The signature theme music was composed by Ayub Bachchu.

== Winner and Nominees ==
=== Public choice awards ===
Best Male Singer	Best Female Singer
Pritom Hasan - "Laage Ura Dhura" (Film: Toofan); Imran Mahmudul - "Kotha Ektai"; Tahsan Rahman Khan - "Ronge Ronge Rongin Hobo"; Mahtim Sakib - "Meghbalika" (Web film: Kacher Manush Dure Thuiya)	Dilshad Nahar Kona - "Dushtu Kokil" (Film: Toofan); Abanti Sithi - "Beche Jawa Valobasha" (Film: Deyaler Desh); Konal - "Rajkumar" (film: Rajkumar); Tasnia Farin - "Ronge Ronge Rongin Hobo"
Best Film Actor	Best Film Actress
Shakib Khan - Toofan; Pritom Hasan - Kacher Manush Dure Thuiya; Mamnun Hasan Emon - Mayaa; Sariful Razz - Deyaler Desh	Mehazabien Chowdhury - Priyo Maloti; Tasnia Farin - Kacher Manush Dure Thuiya; Puja Cherry - Lipstick; Shobnom Bubly - Deyaler Desh
Best TV Actor	Best TV Actress
Tawsif Mahbub - Love Sab; Ziaul Faruque Apurbo - Golam Mamun; Yash Rohan - Itibritto; Farhan Ahmed Jovan - Vitore Bahire	Tanjim Saiyara Totini - Love Sab; Tasnia Farin - Smritisharok; Mehazabien Chowdhury - Tithidor; Sabila Nur - Golam Mamun
Best Newcomer (Film and Television)
Farrukh Ahmed Rehan - Jugol; Kaarina Kaisar - 36-24-36; Xefar Rahman - Last Defender of Monogamy; Malaika Chowdhury - Shonddikkhon

=== Critics' Choice Awards ===
Best Film	Best Director
Adnan Al Rajeev - Priyo Maloti; Akram Khan - Nokshikathar Jomin; Giasuudin Selim - Kajolrekha	Shankha Dasgupta - Priyo Maloti; Nurul Alam Atique - Peyarar Subash; Robiul Alam Robi - Forget Me Not
Best Actor	Best Actress
Mamnun Hasan Emon - Mayaa; Pritom Hasan - Kacher Manush Dure Thuiya; Rawnak Hasan - Noya Manush	Mehazabien Chowdhury - Priyo Maloti; Tasnia Farin - Kacher Manush Dure Thuiya; Sarika Sabrin - Mayaa
Best Screenwriter in the Short Fiction	Best Director in the Short Fiction
Subrata Sanjib - Rod Brishtir Golpo; Abdullah Al Mamun, Rifat Adnan Papon Sajjad Hossain Bappy - Poroshpor; Jahan Sultana - Tithidor	Jahid Pritom - Buk Poketer Golpo; Potik Shadon - Kichu Kotha Baki; Sajjad Hossain Bappy -Poroshpor
Best Actor in the Short Fiction	Best Actress in the Short Fiction
Khairul Basar - Rod Brishtir Golpo; Yash Rohan - Itibritto; Khairul Basar - Poroshpor	Tasnia Faria - Poroshpor; Mehazabien Chowdhury - Tithidor; Sadia Ayman - Rod Brishtir Golpo
Best Webseries	Best Director (Web series)
Rongila Kitab; Kal Purush; Sinpat	Nuhash Humayun - Dui Shaw; Anam Biswas - Rongila Kitab; Saljar Rahman - Kal Purush
Best Actor (Web series)	Best Actress (Web series)
Mosharraf Karim - Adhunik Bangla Hotel; FS Nayeem - Kal Purush; Mustafizur Nur Imran - Rongila Kitab	Zinnat Ara - Sinpat; Pori Moni - Rongila Kitab; Mehazabien Chowdhury - Ararat
Best Screenwriter (Web series)
Saljar Rahman - Kal Purush; Anam Biswas and Ashraful Alam Shaon - Rongila Kitab; Nuhash Humayun and Gultekin Khan - Dui Shaw

== Special Honoured ==
- Lifetime Achievement Award - Abul Hayat
- Special Award - Shakib Khan

== Host and Jury Board ==
The ceremony was hosted by actors Afran Nisho and Tasnia Farin, with Nilanjana Rahman serving as the co-host, while the opening segment was hosted by actor Afzal Hossain.

- The jury board for the 26th Meril-Prothom Alo Awards was divided into three panels based on media category:

Web Series
Tariq Anam Khan, Aupee Karim, Ashfaque Nipun, and Syed Ahmed Shawki.

Short Fiction
Zahid Hasan, Tropa Majumdar, Shihab Shaheen, and Intekhab Dinar.

Film and Web Film
Afzal Hossain, N Rashed Chowdhury, Azmeri Haque Badhon, and Kamrul Hasan Khasru.

== Presenters and performers ==
=== Presenters ===
List of award presenters at the 26th Meril-Prothom Alo Awards
Presenter(s)	Award Presented
Dilara Zaman	Lifetime Achievement Award
Tauquir Ahmed and Nusrat Imrose Tisha	Short Fiction
Ashfaque Nipun and Afsana Mimi	Best Web Series, Best Director (Web Series)
Shahiduzzaman Selim and Azmeri Haque Badhon	Best Film Actress
Anjan Chowdhury and Motin Rahman	Special Honor for Shakib Khan (25-year contribution)
Jewel Aich and Afzal Hossain	Best Film Actor
Kanak Chapa and Bappa Mazumder	Best Female Playback Singer
Fazlur Rahman Babu and Sumaiya Shimu	Best TV Actor

=== Performers ===
List of performances at the 26th Meril-Prothom Alo Awards
Performance	Details
Opening Dance	Performed by Tama Mirza, Mondira Chakroborty, and Hridy Sheikh; music by Binod Roy; choreography by Ivan Shahriar Sohag; performed by Sohag Dance Group.
Dushtu Kokil	Featuring Bidya Sinha Saha Mim, Dilshad Nahar Kona, and Farrukh Ahmed Rehan; choreography by Ivan Shahriar Sohag; performed by Sohag Dance Group.
TikTok TikTok	Performed by Tawsif Mahbub, Irfan Sajjad, Mumtaheena Toya, Prarthana Fardin Dighi, Dola Rahman, and Twink Kerala; choreography and performance by Eagle Dance Group.
Shakib Khan's Silver Jubilee Tribute	Featuring Mamnun Hasan Emon, Nirab Hossain, Ziaul Roshan, Puja Cherry, and Shakib Khan; vocals by Balam, Dilshad Nahar Kona, Imran Mahmudul, and Arif Rahman Joy; choreography and performance by Eagle Dance Group.
Megastar Shakib Khan	Documentary on Shakib Khan, for 25 years of contribution to Bangladeshi cinema, accompanied by a documentary tribute.
Laage Ura Dhura	Performed by Pritom Hasan; choreography and performance by Eagle Dance Group.

== Superlatives ==
Multiple Nominations

5 — Kacher Manush Dure Thuiya (Web film)

Multiple Wins

3 — Toofan
