= Rajneeti =

Rajneeti (lit. 'politics') may refer to:

- Raajneeti, a 2010 Indian political thriller film by Prakash Jha, a modern adaptation of the Mahabharata starring Ajay Devgan and Ranbir Kapoor
- Rajneeti, a 2017 Bangladeshi socio-political drama film starring Shakib Khan
