= Rajneeti (2017 film) =

Film by Bulbul Biswas

- Official first look poster
- Directed by: Bulbul Biswas
- Written by: Bulbul Biswas
- Produced by: Ashfaq Ahmed
- Starring: Shakib Khan; Apu Biswas; Anisur Rahman Milon; Shahidul Alam Sachchu; Sadek Bachchu; Amit Hasan
- Cinematography: Asaduzzaman Maznu
- Edited by: Touhid Hossain Chowdhury
- Music by: Emon Shaha
- Production company: Arrow Motion Arts
- Distributed by: Arrow Motion Arts
- Release date: 26 June 2017
- Running time: 130 minutes
- Country: Bangladesh
- Language: Bengali
- Box office: ৳16.3 million (first five days)

Rajneeti (transl. Politics) is a 2017 Bangladeshi political thriller film. The film was directed by Bulbul Biswas and produced by Ashfaq Ahmed under the banner of Arrow Motion Arts. The film's story and screenplay were written by Bulbul Biswas and dialogue by Delowar Hossain Dil. It features Shakib Khan, Apu Biswas, Anisur Rahman Milon, Sadek Bachchu, Amit Hasan in lead roles. The film soundtrack is composed by Habib Wahid, Fuad al Muqtadir and Pritam Hasan. It was released on June 26, 2017, on the occasion on Eid al-Fitr in Bangladesh.

The film considers the politics of Bangladesh. The film created controversy. Shakib Khan used a phone number in the film that eventually turned out to be that of a rickshaw driver. That driver later sued him for $60,000 (£45,000) stating that the use of his number led millions to call his number searching for Shakib Khan.

The film depicts two brothers in love with the same woman, and eventually joining rival political parties.

== Plot ==
Ayon Habibullah (Shakib Khan) is an expatriate Bangladeshi. After finishing his studies in South Africa, he dreamed of opening an IT firm back in the country. His father (Ali Raj) was a famous politician from Old Dhaka. He does not want Ayon to get involved in politics in any way.

When Ayon left his job at Microsoft and returned to Bangladesh, his father and mother (Saberi Alam) were very worried. His elder brother Shakil Habibullah (Anisur Rahman Milon) loves him dearly and adopts him. When Ayon goes on a field trip, he falls in love with Arshha (Apu Biswas) and Arshha also fall in love with him. Arsha's father is the chairman of the opposition. As a result, he got into a fight with Arshha's brother Pappu (DJ Sohail) and Shakil beat Pappu to get revenge. As a result, Shakil also fell in love with Arshha. Ayon accidentally kills Pappu to save Shakil from being hit by Pappu's gun. Shakil took advantage of this opportunity to get Arshha and identifies Ayon as Pappu's killer. After hearing the news Ayon's father had a heart attack. As a result, Ayon was forced to enter politics in place of his father. Seeing Ayon's improvement Shakil angrily left the party and joined the opposition.

== Cast ==
- Shakib Khan as Ayon Habibullah
- Apu Biswas as Arshha
- Anisur Rahman Milon as Shakil Habibullah
- Shahidul Alam Sachchu
- Sadek Bachchu as Chhand Sardar
- Amit Hasan as Jabbar Miahn
- Ali Raj
- Pijush Bandyopadhyay
- Jayashri Kaur Jaya
- Subrata Barua
- Shampa Reza
- Saberi Alam as Shanu Begum
- Rebeccad Rofu
- Shiba Shanu as Nazimuddim
- DJ Sohail as Pappu
- Komol Patekar as Bullet
- Labanya Lisa as Aroti Boudi
- Bipasha Kabir as Item number (Guest appearance)

== Soundtrack ==
Rajneeti (Original Motion Picture Soundtrack)

Soundtrack album by Habib Wahid, Fuad al Muqtadir, Pritom Hasan
- Released: 2017
- Recorded: 2016
- Studio: Arrow Motion Arts
- Genre: Feature Film Soundtrack
- Length: 13:30
- Language: Bengali
- Label: Sony Deadsea Bengali
- Producer: Habib Wahid, Fuad al Muqtadir

Singles from Rajneeti
- 1. "O Akash Bole Dena Re (ও আকাশ বলে দেনা রে)" Released: 14 June 2017; 2. "Ghore Fire Elo Re (ঘরে ফিরে এলো রে)" Released: 19 June 2017; 3. "Range Range Moner Range (রঙে রঙে মনের রঙে)" Released: 22 June 2017; 4. "Premer Majhe (প্রেমের মাঝে)" Released: 25 June 2017

Habib Wahid chronology
Bhalobasha Emoni Hoy (2017)	Rajneeti (2017)

Fuad al Muqtadir chronology
Ice Cream (2016)	Rajneeti (2017)

Pritom Hasan chronology
Local Bus (2016)	Rajneeti (2017)	Debi (2018)

The film soundtrack is composed by Habib Wahid, Fuad al Muqtadir and Pritom Hasan. A total of four songs have been used in the film. The first song of the film titled is "O Akash Bole Dena Re" sung by Kheya and Shafayat (Jalali Set) sung the rap as an additional addition. The song tune and music arranged by Habib Wahid and lyrics written by Kabir Bakul. It was released on YouTube on June 14, 2017. Then its second song titled "Ghore Phire Elo Re", which was sung by Parvez Sajjad and Pritam Hasan. The song composed by Pritom Hasan himself and lyrics written by Mehedi Hasan Limon. Which was released on YouTube on June 19, 2017. The third song of the film titled is " Range Range Moner Range" released on June 22, 2017, sung by Fuad al Muqtadir, Konal and Tahsin. The song composed by Fuad al Muqtadir himself and lyrics written by (?). The fourth and last song of the film titled is "Premer, Majhe" sung by Dinat Jahan Munni. The song composed and music arranged by Pritom Hasan and written by Kabir Bakul. The song was released on YouTube on June 25, 2017. All the songs from the film were released on Sony Deadsea Bengali's YouTube channel.

Track list
No.	Title	Lyrics	Music	Singer(s)	Length
1.	"O Akash Bole Dena Re (ও আকাশ বলে দেনা রে)"	Kabir Bakul	Habib Wahid	Kheya, rap: Shafayat (Jalali Set)	2:25
2.	"Ghore Phire Elo Re (ঘরে ফিরে এলো রে)"	Mehedi Hasan Limon	Pritom Hasan	Parvez Sajjad, Pritom Hasan	2:25
3.	"Range Range Moner Range (রঙে রঙে মনের রঙে)"	?	Fuad al Muqtadir	Konal, Fuad al Muqtadir, Tahsin	3:54
4.	"Premer Majhe (প্রেমের মাঝে)"	Kabir Bakul	Pritom Hasan	Dinat Jahan Munni	4:46
Total length:					13:30

== Controversy ==
The film lead actor Shakib Khan was sued with fraud and defamation of ৳5 million for using the personal mobile number of a man named Ijazul Mia of Habiganj, Bangladesh, in a dialogue for the film. The film's director Bulbul Biswas and producer Ashfaq Ahmed were also charged in the same case. Autorickshaw driver Ijazul Mia filed the case in Habiganj Senior Judicial Magistrate's Court in Habiganj on 29 October 2016.

Ijazul Mia mentioned in the charge sheet of the case that, actress Apu Biswas said while giving a dialogue in a sequence of the film 'Rajneeti' (26 minutes and 12 seconds of the film), ‘I will not let go of my dream prince again and again.’ In reply actor Shakib Khan said, ‘I will never leave you, my princess.’ Apu Biswas said again, ‘How do you know that my Facebook ID is "Rajkumari"?’ In reply Shakib Khan said, ‘As you know, my mobile number is....’.

Regarding the case Khan stated, "As an artist I just delivered my dialogue. It is not my responsibility to decide whose mobile phone number it is, whether the number is correct or not. It does not come under my jurisdiction. It's the matter of the film's producer, director and scriptwriter. It turns on them. If any other hero in my place had delivered the dialogue, he had nothing to do.
