= Borbaad (2025 film) =

2025 Bangladeshi film

- Official poster
- Bengali: বরবাদ
- Directed by: Mehedi Hassan Hridoy
- Written by: Mehedi Hassan Hridoy
- Screenplay by: Siddique Ahmad (officially not credited)
- Produced by: Shahreen Akter Sumi; Azeem Haroon
- Starring: Shakib Khan; Jisshu Sengupta; Idhika Paul; Misha Sawdagor; Fazlur Rahman Babu
- Cinematography: Raju Raj; Shailesh Awasthi (officially not credited) (Note: See Controversy section for further details)
- Edited by: Editree
- Music by: Arafat Mohsin
- Production companies: Real Energy Production; Ridhi Sidhi Entertainment
- Distributed by: Real Energy Production
- Release date: 31 March 2025
- Running time: 139 minutes
- Country: Bangladesh
- Language: Bengali
- Budget: ৳15 crore (US$1.2 million) (Note: Borbaad's reported budget varies between ৳15–৳18 crore.)
- Box office: ৳105 crore (US$8.6 million)

Borbaad (Note: Bengali: বরবাদ, romanized: Bôrbād, Bengali pronunciation: [bɔrbaːd]; transl. Destroyed; The word Borbaad is a Bengali and Hindi word that means "ruined," "destroyed," or "devastated". It is often used to describe situations involving complete loss, destruction, or failure, such as a ruined life, plan, or hope.) is a 2025 Bangladeshi romantic action thriller film written and directed by Mehedi Hassan Hridoy, in his directorial debut. The film is produced by Shahreen Akter Sumi and Azeem Haroon under the respective banners of Real Energy Production and Ridhi Sidhi Entertainment. The film features an ensemble cast including Shakib Khan, Idhika Paul, Jisshu Sengupta and Misha Sawdagor in the lead roles.

The film was reportedly scheduled to begin in late August or September 2024. However, filming was delayed due to the anti-discrimination student movement in Bangladesh during July and August. After a delay of almost a month, principal photography finally began on October 20, 2024, at Ellora Studios in Mumbai, India. It brings together Shakib Khan and Idhika Paul in their second collaboration following the success of Priyotoma (2023), which became the second highest grossing Bangladeshi film of all time. This also marks the first collaboration between Khan and Jisshu Sengupta, who has made his comeback to Bangladeshi cinema after nearly 23 years; having previously appeared in the 2002 film Moner Majhe Tumi. Made with a ৳15–৳18 crore production budget, the film is one of the most expensive Bangladeshi film ever-made.

Borbaad was theatrically released on March 31, 2025 on the occasion of Eid al-Fitr. Upon release, the film received rave reviews from critics and audiences, with praise for its cast performances, direction, screenwriting, soundtrack, cinematography and action sequences, though it faced some criticism for its formulaic story line and graphic violence. The film broke several box office records for a Bangladeshi film and emerged as a major box office success. With a reported ৳105 crore worldwide gross, the film stands as the highest grossing Bangladeshi film of 2025 as well as the highest grossing Bangladeshi film of all time.

== Plot ==
Adib Mirza (Misha Sawdagor) is a reputed businessman and politician. He spoils his only son, Ariyan Mirza, (Shakib Khan) into involvement in drugs, scandals, and violence. Adib Mirza always stood as a shield, protecting his son from consequences, which made Ariyan avoid his responsibilities..

Ariyan frequently hosted wild parties, spending lavishly on intoxication and entertainment. At one such party, he meets Nitu (Idhika Paul), who later approaches him for a donation to a charity. Ariyan instantly falls in love with her and begins aggressively pursuing her, showering her with expensive gifts. Anyone who mistreated Nitu would face Ariyan's wrath—once, when Prince (Manav Sachdev), the son of Shihab's (Intekhab Dinar) friend, insulted her, Ariyan urinated on Prince's face in retaliation. In response, Prince asked his father, Naved Khan (Mamunur Rashid), to bring his violent elder brother Farhan (Jisshu Sengupta) back to the country, though Naved initially refused.

Meanwhile, Shihab—Ariyan's maternal uncle—realizes that if Nitu remains in Ariyan's life, he would lose access to his brother-in-law's wealth. He plots to have her killed and eventually has her shot by his henchmen. When Ariyan finds out, he kills Shihab in retaliation.

Learning of the incident, Adib Mirza asks Ariyan to bring Nitu to meet him. Delighted, Ariyan brings her home the next day. However, Nitu shocks everyone by directly confronting Adib with rage. Adib looks at his son angrily, and Nitu reveals the truth: "It was your father who destroyed my family—my father, my sister."

Nitu's father, Sabuj Mia (Fazlur Rahman Babu), was a poor laborer falsely framed and sentenced to death for murder by Adib Mirza, Naved Khan, and other political leaders. Nitu's sister, Mitu (Riya Ganguly Chakraborty), had once pleaded with Adib to release their father, but he demanded sexual favors in return. Left with no choice, Mitu agreed—but even then, Adib could not save Sabuj. Mitu later committed suicide.

After revealing everything, Nitu leaves. From that point on, she avoids Ariyan. Despite Ariyan's repeated attempts to win her back, Nitu continues to reject him, often treating him harshly and pretending not to care. Desperate, Ariyan even has his father apologize to Nitu on his behalf. He later storms Naved Khan's home and guns down everyone responsible for framing Sabuj Mia, using a micro gun. Still, Nitu remains distant.

Hearing of his father's death, Farhan returns to the country, and Prince informs him of everything. Farhan plots to kill Ariyan and causes a truck accident that leaves him severely injured.

Meanwhile, Farhan kidnaps Nitu and, upon seeing her, falls in love with her himself. He decides to marry her. When Ariyan recovers slightly and learns of the wedding, he storms the venue, driven by vengeance. He kills Prince and Farhan and shoots Nitu. As she lies dying, Nitu emotionally reveals how much she truly loved Ariyan. Realizing the depth of her feelings, Ariyan rushes her to the hospital, but she dies on the way.

Devastated, Ariyan surrenders to the police and voluntarily confesses in court that he killed Nitu. The court sentences him to death. Unable to bear the grief of losing his son, Adib Mirza takes his own life.

== Cast ==
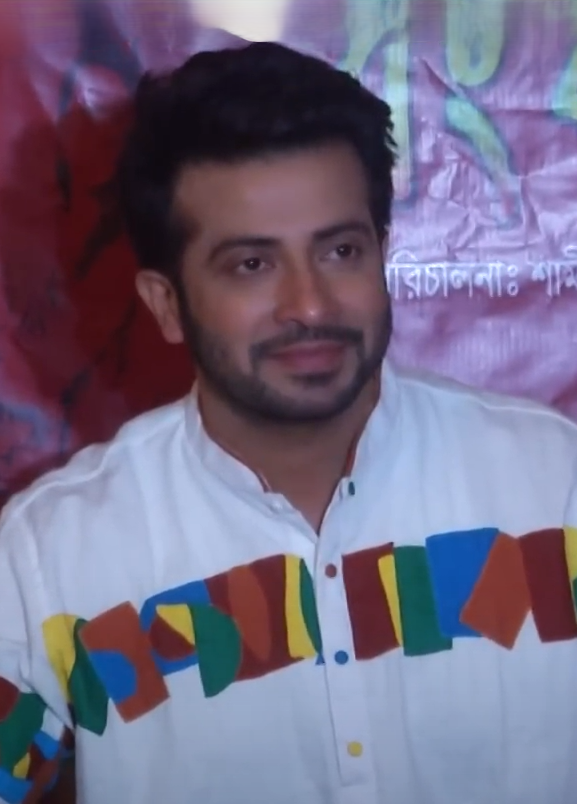
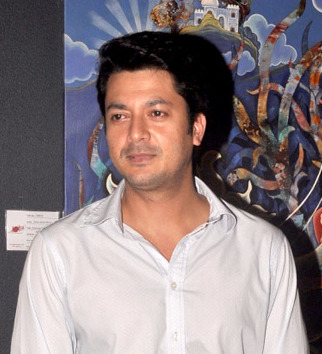
Shakib Khan in 2017 (left) and Jisshu Sengupta in 2014 (right) teamed up for the first time in this film, which also marks Sengupta's return to Bangladeshi cinema after 23 years.
- Shakib Khan as Ariyan Mirza
- Idhika Paul as Nitu, Ariyan's love interest
- Jisshu Sengupta as Muhammad "Farhan" Khan, Naved Khan's elder son
- Misha Sawdagor as Adib Mirza, Ariyan Mirza's father
- Corovi Mizan Rivi as Ariyan Mirza's mother
- Shahiduzzaman Selim as a senior barrister
- Riya Ganguly Chakraborty as Mitu, Nitu's sibling
- Samm Bhattacharya as Zillu, Ariyan Mirza's bodyguard and personal assistant
- Mamunur Rashid as Naved Khan, a minister
- Fazlur Rahman Babu as Sabuj Mia, Nitu's father
- Intekhab Dinar as Shihab, Ariyan's maternal uncle
- Naresh Bhuiyan as Nitu and Mitu's paternal uncle
- Manav Sachdev as Prince, Naved Khan's younger son
- Jahid Islam as Rabiul, a police official
- Nader Chowdhury as a minister
- Nusrat Jahan as item number, cameo appearance in "Chand Mama" song

== Production ==
=== Development ===
The film, made with a production budget ৳15–৳18 crore, has become one of the most expensive Bangladeshi films ever made. Channel i reports that 80% of the filming will take place outside the country. The film will be of the action-violence genre; while Bengali audiences have watched numerous action films, they have not experienced this type of action before. Indian renowned action director Ravi Varma has reportedly worked on the film as the stunt director for action sequences. Known for his work in numerous Bollywood and Telugu films, he will be joined by Aejaz Master from Mumbai, along with several other top-tier stunt directors. Bollywood choreographer Adil Sheikh is reportedly on board for the dance sequences. Indian cinematographer Shailesh Awasthi is serving as the director of photography for the film. In early October, Channel i reported that makeup artist Amit Amberkar, who had previously worked on Ranbir Kapoor's Animal (2023), is handling the makeup for the film. On September 30, 2024, the look set and photoshoot for the film took place, where Amberkar finalized Khan's look in the film. Amberkar told Channel i about Khan's look, "The hero's look for the film has now been finalized. The director may soon offer the audience a glimpse of it." Channel i confirmed that the look would be revealed before October 10, 2024.

=== Casting ===
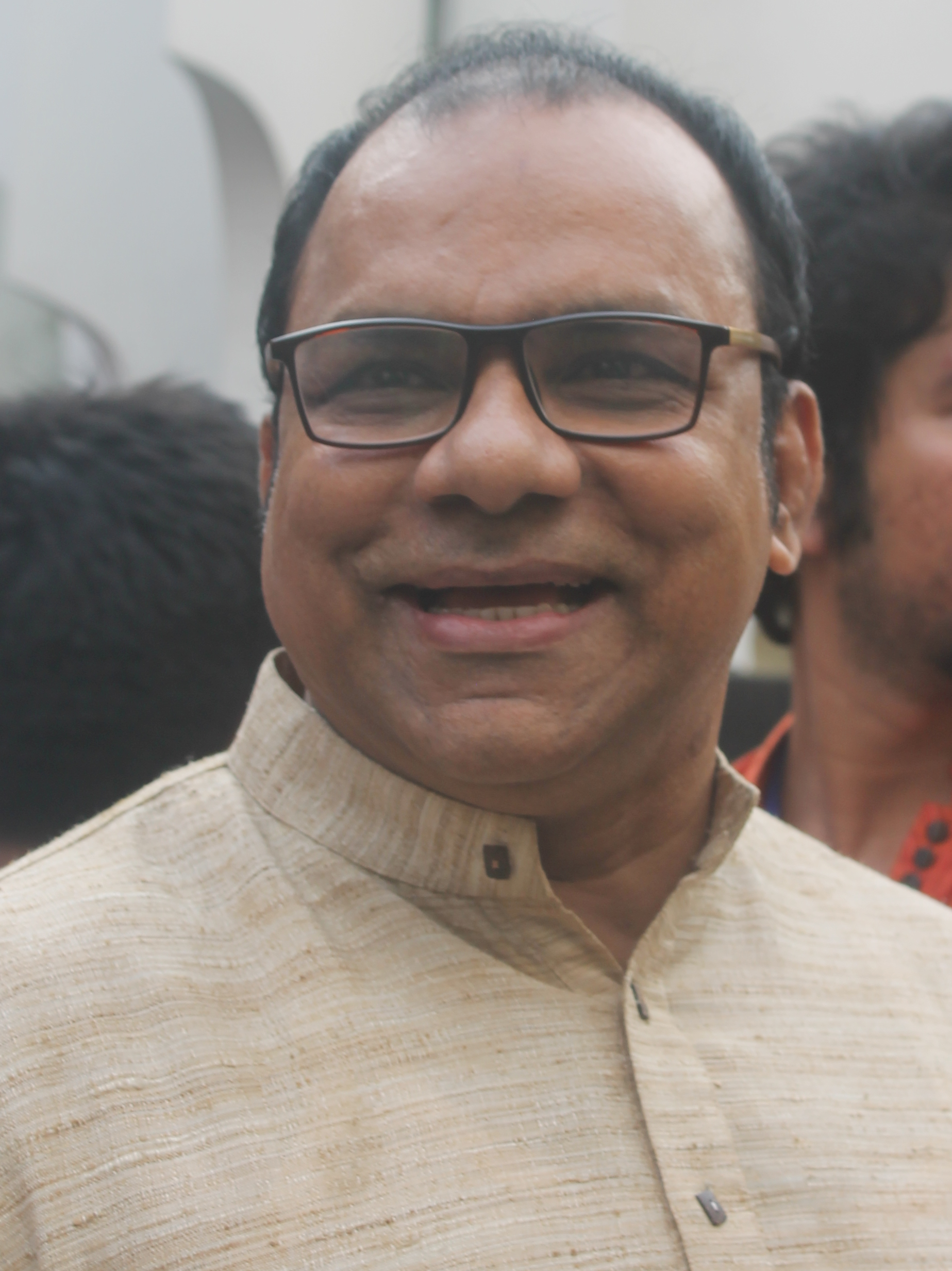
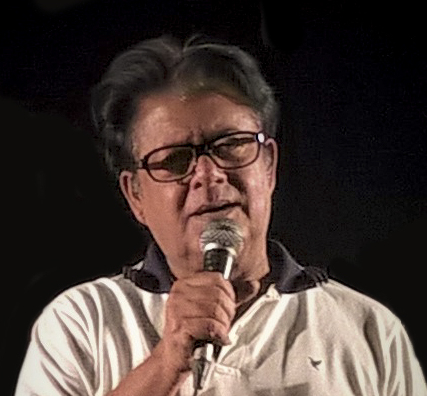
Following a long journey as a hero–villain duo, Misha Sawdagor (left) and Khan appear together for the first time as father and son, while Mamunur Rashid (right) also shares the screen with Khan for the first time.
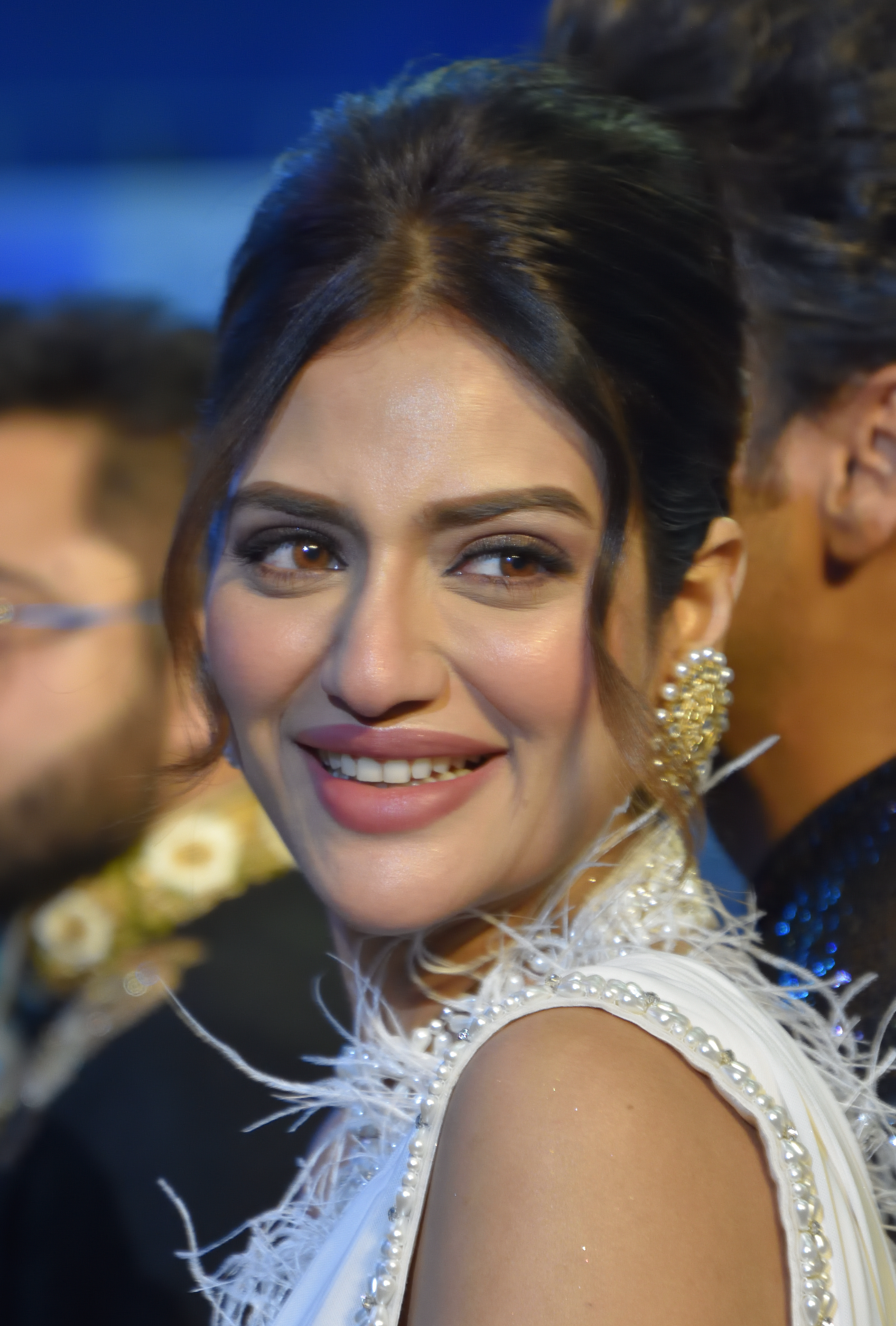
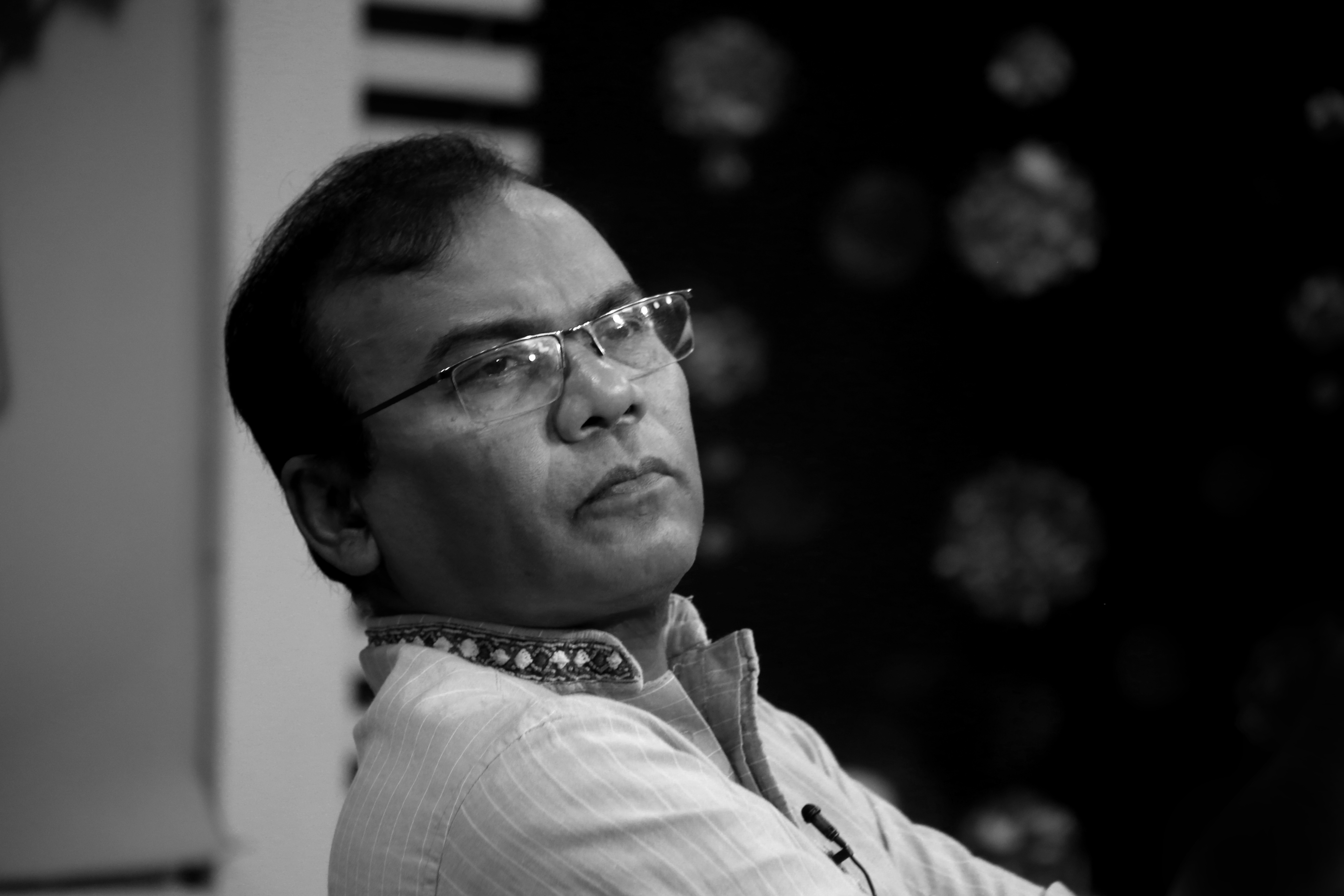
Nusrat Jahan (left) reunited with Khan following the joint production film Naqaab (2018), while Fazlur Rahman Babu (right) shared the screen with him again after Toofan (2024).

Mehedi Hasan Hridoy, who wrote the story and screenplay, also directed the film, marking his debut as a director in a full-length feature film, though he has previously directed over a hundred dramas. Shakib Khan signed onto the film in October 2023 after being satisfied with the screenplay he heard from the director. Commenting on the screenplay, he said, "I really liked the script. I always look for smart and unique stories where I can portray myself differently. It helps me take on new challenges." During the first-look launching event on December 18, 2024, Khan shared that he had given the director just 15 minutes to present the screenplay. Director Hridoy stated in a television interview that Khan received a remuneration of ৳1.20 crore for his role in the film. Following the success of Priyotoma (2023), which became the highest grossing Bangladeshi film ever-made, with Shakib Khan, Idhika Paul was later collaborated with Sariful Razz on a film titled Kobi, which was initially supposed to feature Shakib Khan. Rumors later surfaced that Idhika would appear as the lead actress in another film alongside Shakib Khan. Later, in the first week of June 2024, NTV and Samakal confirmed Idhika's involvement in the project. There were rumors that the film's casting would include several surprises for the audience, with the biggest being the addition of renowned Indian actor Jisshu Sengupta. He was previously expected to appear in Shakib Khan's film Toofan (2024), but scheduling conflicts prevented that from happening. However, several individuals associated with the film have now confirmed that Sengupta and Khan will be working together in Borbaad. As of late October, the production house has not yet made an official announcement. He appears in the official teaser, confirming his involvement in the film and has made his comeback to Bangladeshi cinema after nearly 23 years, having previously appeared in the Matiur Rahman Panu's 2002 film Moner Majhe Tumi. Bangladeshi prominent television actor Mamunur Rashid has joined the cast of the film, where he plays a negative character. About his role, he stated, "This has allowed me to experiment with a different style of acting. I believe the audience will see me in a new and different role."

Indian actress Nusrat Jahan will make a cameo appearance in an item song for the film. The song has already been filmed in Mumbai, as she personally confirmed during an interview with an Indian YouTube channel. This marks her second collaboration with Shakib Khan; earlier, in 2018, she teamed up with him in the joint production film Naqaab (2018). Indian television actress Riya Ganguly Chakraborty has joined the cast of the film, where she is reportedly playing the role of lead actress Idhika Paul's sister. By early January 2025, she had completed filming her portions in Kolkata and Mumbai and is now waiting for the schedule to shoot in Bangladesh.

=== Filming ===
It was initially reported that the shooting of the film was set to begin in late August or September 2024. However, the production of the film was delayed due to Anti-discrimination student movement in Bangladesh during July and August along with his another upcoming film Sher. In mid-August, director Mehedi Hasan Hridoy informed Samakal that they planned to start shooting Barbaad by the end of September. "Given the current situation in the country, it's difficult to say anything for sure," he stated. "Additionally, Shakib Khan is currently in the United States, and we need to discuss with him before making any decisions about starting the shoot. Until then, nothing can be confirmed." Following a delay of almost a month, the principal photography of the film Barbaad commenced on October 20, 2024, at Ellora Studios in Mumbai, India. On the same day, director Mehedi Hasan Hridoy unveiled a scene from the shooting set as Barbaad First Frame. On October 22, Shakib Khan, who is reportedly playing the main protagonist in the film, traveled to Mumbai, India, to participate in the filming. Later, he began filming on October 24, with the first phase scheduled to continue until November 10. Actor Mamunur Rashid, who reportedly plays a negative role, returned to the country on October 25 after filming his scenes.

On November 7, 2024, Khan sustained a serious injury above his eye after a strong impact with a door on the film set. He was promptly taken to a hospital in Mumbai, where doctors provided initial treatment and performed a CT scan. After two hours of care and rest, he returned to filming. Originally, the first segment of the shoot was scheduled to continue until November 10, but on November 9, the director confirmed it would be extended to November 16. The first phase of filming took place from October 24 to November 16, followed by Shakib Khan's return to Bangladesh on November 18. It has been reported that after a brief break, the second and final phase of shooting will commence in December. It is reported that 70% of the filming for Borbaad was completed in Mumbai over the course of a month starting in October 2024. However, the production faced a month-long break, leading to online rumors that lead actress Idhika Paul had missed her shooting schedule, causing delays. Although director Mehedi Hasan Hridoy, speaking to Channel i, dismissed these rumors and explained that the break was taken to finalize another important look for Khan in the film. Shakib Khan traveled to Mumbai again around January 10 or 11, 2025 for the second phase of the filming. After completing two weeks of shooting, he returned to Dhaka on January 29. A song for the film was shot in Dubai, after which Khan returned to the country on March 22.

== Music ==
Borbaad

Soundtrack album by Pritom Hasan
- Recorded: 2024
- Studio: Real Energy Production
- Genre: Feature Film Soundtrack
- Length: 12:26
- Language: Bengali
- Label: Real Energy Production
- Producer: Pritom Hasan

Pritom Hasan chronology
| Toofan (2024) | Borbaad (2025) | Taandob (2025) |

Singles from Borbaad
- 1. "Didha" Released: 14 Mar 2025; 2. "Nisshash" Released: 24 Mar 2025; 3. "Chand Mama" Released: 28 Mar 2025; 4. "Mayabi" Released: 31 Mar 2025; 5. "Mohamaya" Released: 14 April 2025; 6. "Lambo" Released: 05 May 2025

Pritom Hasan has collaborated with Shakib Khan once again, as they previously achieved success with the song Laage Ura Dhura from the 2024 film Toofan. Arafat Mohsin composed the film's background score, following his acclaimed work on Shakib Khan's magnum opus Toofan (2024), where he also contributed two songs. His compositions were well received by both audiences and critics. Asif Akbar is set to perform a romantic track in the film, reuniting with Khan after a decade; he previously lent his voice for the actor in the 2015 film Rajababu: The Power. A pre-release teaser for the film's first song, Didha, was unveiled on March 12. Following this, the song was officially released as a single on March 14. The first track penned by Inamul Tahsin, while both composed and performed by Pritom Hasan. The second single Nisshash was released on March 24 as lyrical, featuring G. M. Ashraf with arrangement by Adib Kabir. The item number Chand Mama was released on March 28, coinciding with Khan's 46th birthday, as the third single. The track was composed, written, and performed by Pritom Hasan, with a duet by Dola Rahman. It received widespread recognition, along with praise for Khan and Nusrat Jahan's performances. Jahan reunited with Khan following the success of Naqaab (2018) and made a comeback with an item number after 10 years. The final track, "Mohamaya", performed by Mainul Ahsan Noble, was released on 14 April, coinciding with the Bengali New Year 1432. Before its official release on YouTube, the audio track began trending on the release topic.

| No. | Title | Lyrics | Music | Singer(s) | Length |
|---|---|---|---|---|---|
| 1. | "Didha" | Inamul Tahsin | Pritom Hasan | Pritom Hasan | 3:05 |
| 2. | "Nisshash" | G. M. Ashraf | Adib Kabir; G. M. Ashraf | G. M. Ashraf | 2:47 |
| 3. | "Chand Mama" | Pritom Hasan | Pritom Hasan | Pritom Hasan; Dola Rahman | 3:03 |
| 4. | "Mayabi" | Ritam Sen | Rathijit Bhattacharjee | Imran Mahmudul; Konal | 3:31 |
| 5. | "Mohamaya" | | | | 3:07 |
| 6. | "Lambo" | Cfu 36 (Saif Khan) | Arafat Mohsin Nidhi | Cfu 36 (Saif Khan) | 1:26 |
| 7. | "Zinda" | Shomeshwar Oli | Khairul Wasi | Khairul Wasi | 3:17 |

== Marketing ==
The director had initially informed Channel i that the first look of the film would be released before October 10, 2024. However, it was not unveiled at that time. The poster launch event for Barbaad was eventually held on December 18 at a hotel in Dhaka, where a 20-second motion poster was revealed. During the same event, U.S.-based Remark-Harlan's subsidiary, Lily – Always BeYoutiful, was announced as the film's title sponsor. The official teaser of the film was released on February 27, 2025. The 1-minute 44-second teaser gained widespread recognition, featuring leading man Shakib Khan in a never-before-seen avatar. A character glimpse of Jisshu Sengupta was revealed on March 15, coinciding with his birthday.

== Release ==
=== Censorship ===
The censorship of Borbaad was delayed due to the participation of foreign artists and crew members without prior approval from the Ministry of Information and Broadcasting. The film was intended to be submitted to the Bangladesh Film Certification Board (BFCB) only after receiving this approval. However, delays in obtaining the necessary documents led to uncertainty regarding its release.

On March 23, reports emerged that the film might not be released during Eid al-Fitr. That same night, the ministry issued a No Objection Certificate (NOC). The following day, March 24, the film was submitted to the BFCB, as confirmed by the board's Vice Chairman, Abdul Jalil.

After screening the film, the certification board objected to 12 minutes of footage, citing excessive violence, including a graphic throat-slitting scene. Instead of granting the requested "A" certificate, the board required specific cuts before approval.

The decision led to protests on social media. On March 25, fans of Shakib Khan, known as Shakibians, staged a demonstration outside the certification board, demanding an uncut censor. (Note: Attributed to multiple sources:) Bangladeshi film artists, including cast and crews from four other upcoming Eid al-Fitr films, also called for the film to be approved without edits. The Bangladesh Film Exhibitors' Association submitted a letter to the Bangladesh Film Development Corporation (BFDC), protesting the restrictions on the film's release.

Eventually, after modifying the objectionable scenes, the film was granted a "U" certificate. In a Facebook post, the production company stated that the final submitted version, with a runtime of 2 hours, 19 minutes, and 10 seconds, had undergone 16 seconds cuts, with certain scenes blurred as per board directives.

=== Pre-release business ===
Borbaad has reportedly set a new benchmark in bookings, surpassing the record previously held by Khan's 2024 hit Toofan, which had a maximum booking price of ৳7 to ৳12 lakh. Instead, the film has secured a booking of ৳15 lakh, marking the highest pre-release rental for a Bangladeshi film.

Among the notable bookings, Chitrali Cinema Hall in Khulna acquired the film for ৳13 lakh, the second-highest rental. Initially, the producer set a ৳5 lakh minimum rental price; however, in response to market demand, many smaller cinemas outside Dhaka booked it for as low as ৳1.5 lakh.

Additionally, Momota Cinema Hall in Madhabdi, Narsingdi, booked the film for ৳2 lakh, further reflecting its strong commercial appeal.

=== Theatrical release ===
The film was theatrically released nationwide in cinemas dated on 31 March 2025, coinciding with Eid al-Fitr. It has completed a 50-day theatrical run. The film was released in the United States on April 18, 2025, followed by Canada on April 19, and Australia and New Zealand on April 26. It was distributed by Shakib Khan's production company, SK Films USA, marking his debut as an international film distributor.

=== Online piracy ===
The film fell victim to piracy on the very day of its release, with several unauthorized clips circulating online and a full version reportedly being shared via Telegram. On April 1, 2025, the film's producer, Shahrin Akter Sumi, filed a General Diary (GD) at Gulshan Police Station concerning the incident. Following this, director Mehedi Hasan Hridoy and producer Sumi submitted a formal complaint to the Cyber and Special Crime Division of the Dhaka Metropolitan Police, requesting an investigation.

Additionally, one individual was detained from the Bonrupa Cinema Hall in Gazipur for allegedly recording scenes from the film using a hidden camera during a screening.

On 8 May 2025, an FIR was filed at Gulshan Police Station following the leak of an HD-quality version of the film online. At a press conference held the same day in Gulshan, addressing the issue of piracy, the film's producer alleged that the leak had been carried out from within the country in a cold and calculated manner. Qinetic Music, which handled the film's digital distribution, reported that a total of 248,691 pirated videos had been removed from Facebook over the previous seven days, with a record 80,000 videos taken down on 3 May alone.

== Reception ==
=== Critical receptions ===
Borbaad was met with positive reviews. Shakib Khan's performance was praised as one of his most mature, with critics noting the film's strong blend of romance, revenge, and commercial appeal. Though some supporting roles felt underused, the film stood out for its sleek execution and mass entertainment value.

Film director Chayanika Chowdhury praised its story and Shakib Khan's acting skill. To her, the presentation of Khan's character in the film was unique. She also noted Khan and Paul's romantic chemistry positively. Zahirul Qaiyum Firoz of NTV praised the film for its bold commercial storytelling, writing that it "challenges traditional Bangladeshi cinema by blending romance, revenge, and redemption into a gripping, emotionally charged narrative led by a reinvented Shakib Khan." Filmmaker and screenwriter Sanjay Samaddar of Samakal felt that the film stood out for its ambitious scale and Khan's commanding screen presence, writing that his "nuanced portrayal of a complex, larger-than-life character anchors a film that balances action, emotion, and spectacle with surprising finesse." Pritha Parmita Nag of Prothom Alo appreciated the film for its scale, stylized action, and Khan's dominant screen presence, writing that his "commanding performance and striking look bring depth to a chaotic yet compelling story of obsession and redemption, making the film a noteworthy entry in mainstream Bangladeshi cinema." Ahsan Kabir of Bangla Tribune rated the film 5 out of 10, describing it as a film marked by excessive violence, drug use, and adult content, rendering it unsuitable for children. He criticized the performances of Khan and Jisshu Sengupta, citing a lack of emotional depth, while praising veteran actors such as Mamunur Rashid, Kazi Hayat, and Fazlur Rahman Babu for their consistent portrayals. Kabir noted that although the film exhibited cinematic qualities, it relied heavily on formulaic storytelling and graphic content. Nur Islam Tipu of Independent Television praised Khan's performance as the "soul of the film" and highlighted the stylish action and romance. He commended the supporting cast but felt Sengupta's role lacked impact. Despite some pacing and dialogue issues, Tipu called Borbaad a "fully entertaining commercial film" and rated it 4 out of 5. Protinediner Bangladesh hailed the film as a striking comeback for Khan, comparing his performance to a phoenix rising from the ashes. The review praised Mehedi Hasan Hridoy's bold direction, Idhika Paul's surprising presence, and the film's emotional core. While it noted flaws in visual effects and the villain's arc, it called Borbaad a landmark in Khan's evolving career and a bold step in commercial Bangladeshi cinema.

=== Box office ===
Although Bangladesh does not have an official box office tracking system, available data indicates that the film Borbaad grossed approximately ৳72.61 lakh in multiplexes over two days. The film earned ৳28.30 lakh on its opening day, with earnings increasing to ৳44.31 lakh on the second day. The film grossed approximately ৳27.43 crore (US$2.2 million) in its first week, as confirmed by the production company in a public statement posted on Facebook on April 8, 2025, surpassing the one-month record of ৳27 crore previously set by Priyotoma (2023). (Note: Attributed to multiple sources:) In its first 20 days of release, the film grossed ৳50.82 crore (US$4.1 million) at the box office, making it the second highest-grossing Bangladeshi film of all time, behind only Toofan (2024). (Note: Attributed to multiple sources:) The film grossed ৳62.57 crore (US$5.1 million) at the box office by the end of its 25th day in theatres, as reported by The Daily Star, citing producer Shahrin Akhter Sumi. The figure was also referenced in a Prothom Alo report on the box office performance of films released during Eid al-Fitr 2025. The film grossed approximately ৳75 crore (US$6.1 million), as confirmed by the producers in a press conference held in Gulshan following the online leak of the HD version on May 8, 2025.

== Awards ==
| Year | Award | Category | Winner | Results | Ref. |
|---|---|---|---|---|---|
| 2026 | Dhallywood Film and Music Awards | Best Film Actor | Shakib Khan | Won | |
| 2026 | Dhallywood Film and Music Awards | Best Supporting Actor (critics' choice) | Misha Sawdagor | Won | |
| 2026 | Meril-Prothom Alo Awards | Best Film | —N/a | Nominated | |

== Controversy ==
A dispute arose regarding the cinematography credit of the film. Indian cinematographer Shailesh Awasthi claimed that he was the film's principal cinematographer and played a leading role in its creative and visual execution. He alleged that he was excluded from the final credits, where the cinematography was instead credited to Raju Raj. However, Awasthi later referred to the issue as a misunderstanding and went on to commend the director's efforts.

== Impact ==
Borbaad became the first Bangladeshi film to enter IMDb's "Top 100 most popular films", ranking 44th on the chart seventeen days after its release. This milestone marked a significant moment for Bangladeshi cinema on the global stage.
