= Bossgiri =

2016 film directed by Shamim Ahamed Roni

- Official poster
- Bengali: বসগিরি
- Directed by: Shamim Ahamed Roni
- Screenplay by: Shamim Ahamed Roni
- Story by: Delowar Hossain Dil
- Produced by: Topi Khan
- Starring: Shakib Khan; Shabnom Bubly; Rajatava Dutta; Amit Hasan
- Narrated by: Asif Rana
- Cinematography: Tuban
- Edited by: Anik Sikder
- Music by: Akassh; Imran Mahmudul; Dabbu
- Production company: Khan Films
- Distributed by: Jaaz Multimedia (Bangladesh); svf entertainment (India)
- Release date: 12 September 2016
- Running time: 165 minutes
- Country: Bangladesh
- Language: Bangla

Bossgiri (English title: Where The Action Ends) is a Bangladeshi romantic action drama film directed by Shamim Ahamed Roni and produced by Topi Khan under the banner of Khan Films. The film stars Shakib Khan and Shabnom Bubly in lead roles. The film was an Eid-ul-Adha release on 12 September 2016 and was Shabnam Bubly's debut film.

== Plot ==
Bossgiri follows the story of a man who, after trying to earn a decent living, must turn to becoming a don of the city.

== Cast ==
- Shakib Khan as Boss / Lucky / SK
- Shabnom Bubly as Bubly
- Rajatava Dutta as Double DK
- Amit Hasan as DK
- Maznun Mizan as System
- Chikon Ali as Pk
- Mizu Ahmed as Shafik Patwary
- Sadek Bachchu as Arbaj Khan
- Ratan Khan

== Release ==
The film released alongside the holiday of Eid al-Adha in Bangladesh on 12 September 2016. In November 2017, it was announced by distributor Jaaz Multimedia that in a film exchange with SVF Entertainment of West Bengal, Bossgiri would be released in India.

== Critical reception ==
In a review by Zahid Akbar of The Daily Star, Bossgiri was given 3/5 stars, noted for a strong cast and soundtrack, but with a weak story. The review criticized the lack of originality and direction in terms of the story, while also being critical of the costumes, hairstyles and choreography, however also praised the performances of newcomer Shabnom Bubly and lead actor Shakib Khan, specifically his Dhakaiya accent, and also the soundtrack.

== Soundtrack ==
Bossgiri (Original Motion Picture Soundtrack)

Soundtrack album by Various Artists
- Released: September 2016
- Genre: Feature Film Soundtrack
- Language: Bengali
- Label: Lollipop

Singles from Bossgiri: Original Motion Picture Soundtrack
- 1. "Mon Toke Chara" Released: 28 August 2016

The soundtrack for Bossgiri featured music from different artists. The songs were composed by Akassh, Shouqat Ali Imon, Imran Mahmudul and Dabbu, while also featuring the vocals of singers Kona, Nancy, S.I. Tutul and Satrujit Dasgupta.

=== Track listing ===
No.	Title	Lyrics	Music	Singer(s)	Length
1.	"Mon Toke Chara"	Robiul Islam Jibon	Akassh	Akassh	3:35
2.	"Dil Dil Dil"	Kabir Bakul	Shouquat Ali Imon	Imran Mahmudul & Dilshad Nahar Kona	4:43
3.	"Kono Mane Nei To"	Robiul Islam Jibon	Imran Mahmudul	Imran Mahmudul & Nazmun Munira Nancy	4:18
4.	"Bubly Bubly Bubly"	Kabir Bakul	Shouquat Ali Imon	S.I. Tutul	4:37
5.	"Bossgiri (Title Song)"	Satrujit Dasgupta	Dabbu	Satrujit Dasgupta	3:22

== Awards ==
=== Meril Prothom Alo Awards ===
Year	Nominee / work	Award	Result
2017	Shabnom Bubly	Best Newcomer	Won
2017	Imran Mahmudul for Dil Dil Dil	Best Singer (Male)	Won
2017	Kona for Dil Dil Dil	Best Singer (Female)	Won

=== Safekeeper Channel i Digital Media Award 2020 ===
Name	Award	Note
Shakib Khan	Best Actor Award	
Shabnom Bubly	Best Actress Award	
