= Toofan (2024 film) =

2024 Bangladeshi crime thriller film by Raihan Rafi

- Theatrical release poster
- Bengali: তুফান
- Directed by: Raihan Rafi
- Written by: Raihan Rafi
- Screenplay by: Raihan Rafi, Adnan Adib Khan
- Story by: Raihan Rafi
- Produced by: Shahriar Shakil Redoan Rony Mahendra Soni
- Starring: Shakib Khan; Mimi Chakraborty; Masuma Rahman Nabila; Chanchal Chowdhury; Misha Sawdagor
- Cinematography: Tahsin Rahman
- Edited by: Subhajit Singha
- Music by: Arafat Mohsin; Naved Parvez; Pritom Hasan; Akassh
- Production company: Alpha-i
- Distributed by: Chorki (Bangladesh); Shree Venkatesh Films (International); Bioscope Films (Middle East and North America); Bongoz Films (Oceania)
- Release date: 17 June 2024 (Bangladesh)
- Running time: 143 minutes
- Country: Bangladesh (Note: See Controversy section for further details)
- Language: Bengali
- Budget: ৳7 crore (US$570,000)
- Box office: ৳56 crore (US$4.6 million)

Toofan (Note: Bengali: তুফান, romanized: tūfān, Bengali pronunciation: [t̪upʰan]; transl. Storm) is a 2024 Bangladeshi Bengali-language film directed by Raihan Rafi and produced by Shahriar Shakil under the banner of Alpha-i Studios Limited, SVF Entertainment and Chorki. The story of the film revolves around a gangster of Bangladesh in the nineties, featuring Shakib Khan along with Mimi Chakraborty, Masuma Rahman Nabila, and Chanchal Chowdhury.

It is the first collaboration between Khan, Rafi and Chowdhury. The film is marked Khan's 250th film. Toofan received mixed to positive with praise for Shakib Khan (Toofan)and Chanchal Chowdhury's performance, music, songs, action, visual style and technical aspects, though received criticism for its plot, pacing, lack of originialty and Shakib Khan's Performance (Shanto). It broke several box office records for a Bangladeshi film. With an approximate gross of ৳56 crore, it is the second highest grossing Bangladeshi film of all time, as well as highest grossing Bangladeshi film of 2024. Globally, it is the most widely released Bangladeshi film of all time, having been released in nearly twenty countries, as well as the first Bangladeshi film to have grossed over ৳56 crore (US$4.6 million).

== Plot ==
In 1994, aspiring actor Shanto goes to FDC looking for a role in a movie but is dismissed. On the set, costume designer Julie mistakes Shanto for a background dancer and sends him to the dance floor. The movie's lead actor, Raj, becomes furious when he sees Shanto, who is taller and more handsome than him, and demands that the director removes Shanto from the set. Feeling guilty, Julie manages to get Shanto some minor roles as a background fighter.

Later, Raj gets into an altercation with some local goons. Julie tries to calm the situation, but the goons turn on her. Shanto steps in and fights them off, impressing the film's director, Rocky. Rocky sees potential in Shanto as a hero but can only secure him a role as a secondary villain in an upcoming film. The leading actress in the movie, Suchona, also takes notice. However, during the premiere, Shanto is humiliated when his scenes are cut, embarrassing him in front of his neighborhood. Despondent, he contemplates suicide, only to be taken hostage by Toofan's men.

It is revealed that Suchona had removed Shanto's scenes because of his resemblance to Toofan, a top terrorist and mafia kingpin, who also happens to be her lover. Toofan wants Shanto to impersonate him for a "movie." Shanto pleads for two months to learn how to emulate Toofan. Toofan's advisor and mentor, Jalaluddin, briefs Shanto on Toofan's history:

In 1961, in Alokdiya village, Toofan, born Galib Bin Ghani, loses his mother during childbirth. In 1974, his father, Ghani Miah, stands up against a local land raider named Shehnawaz, threatening legal action. In retaliation, Shehnawaz kills Ghani. A vengeful Galib decapitates Shehnawaz and is arrested. A local gangster, Bashir, sees potential in Galib and bribes the police to release him, taking Galib under his wing and giving him the nickname "Toofan," though he treats him like a servant.

In 1985, Toofan kills Bashir during a “friendly” wrestling match by snapping his neck and seizes control of his gang. He then sets his sights on expanding his criminal empire to the capital, Dhaka. At the same time, rival gangster Talat has similar ambitions. Toofan allies with Talat, pretending to be his right-hand man, only to poison him at their first meeting.

In 1990, Toofan's right-hand man, Jamshed, arranges a meeting with the leaders of the opposition party at a social gathering before the upcoming elections. However, they insult him, dismissing him as a village thug. Enraged, Toofan kills them all with a minigun, gaining nationwide notoriety. He later meets with a minor political faction, the "Janata Party," funding them while his men eliminate top political figures to remove competition. The Janata Party wins the election, securing the most seats.

At a club party, Toofan becomes infatuated with lead dancer Suchona. When a man tries to dance with her, Toofan shoots him dead. The victim, Sohan Choudhary, was a rising star of the 1990s, sparking a media scandal. Toofan forces Home Minister Ariffin to release a statement denying his existence. Growing reckless, Toofan expands his influence into various sectors, making him uncontrollable.

In the present, Shanto successfully imitates Toofan. To test him, Toofan sends Shanto to his bedroom to see if Suchona can tell the difference, but she fails to notice. Meanwhile, the president authorizes Home Minister Arifin to eliminate Toofan. Ariffin assigns Assistant Commissioner Akram and his team to track down Toofan. Akram, who has detailed information on Toofan, finds Jalaluddin and severely injures him. Upon hearing the news, Toofan rescues Jalaluddin but becomes furious when he learns that Jalaluddin had provided Akram with critical evidence and was set to testify against him, prompting Toofan to kill him.

Akram arrests many of Toofan's men, including Jamshed, and interrogates Suchona. The police issue a wanted poster of Toofan. Toofan, fearing capture, forces Suchona to call Akram and give him Shanto's address as his own while he escapes to Dubai. However, wanting to escape Toofan's control, Suchona provides Akram the true location of Toofan's car, leading Akram to kill Toofan, making national headlines.

Three days later, Akram questions why Suchona betrayed Toofan. She reveals that during Shanto's test, she accidentally informed him that Toofan only intended to use him as a body double, which led Shanto to beg for his life. Fearing Toofan's violent nature, she decided to act. Shanto eventually becomes a rising star.

In the post-credits scene, it is revealed that Akram did not actually kill Toofan, who is recovering in a hospital.

== Cast ==
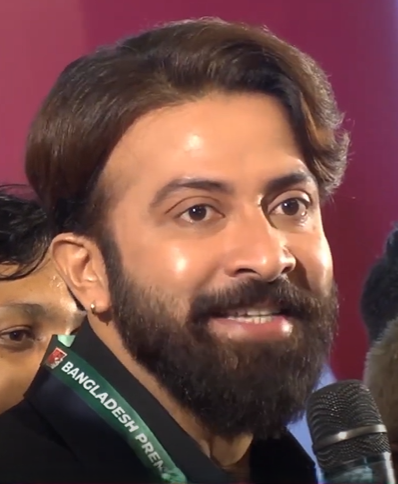
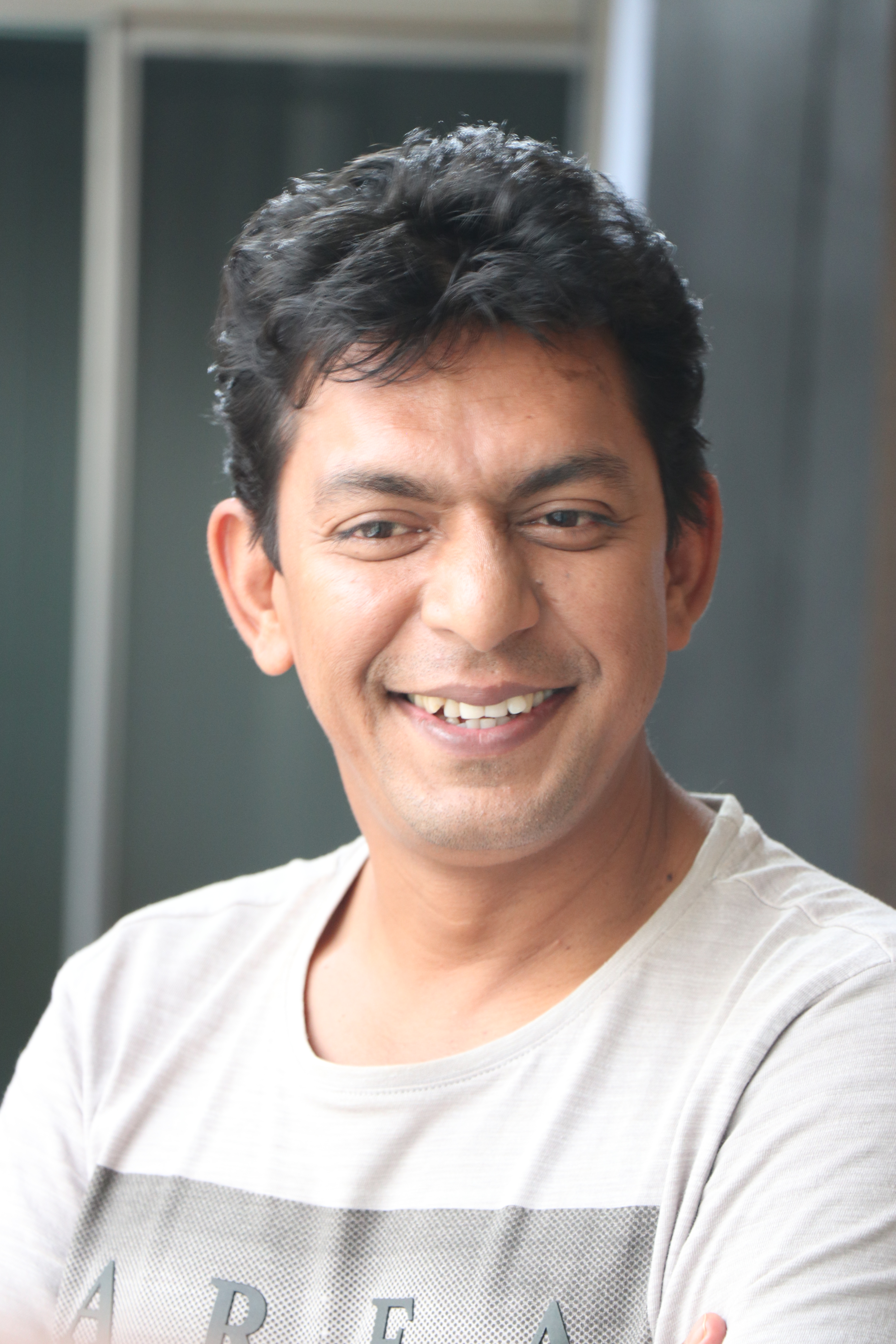
Shakib Khan in 2024 (left) and Chanchal Chowdhury in 2018 (right)
- Shakib Khan in a dual role as
  - Galib Bin Ghani a.k.a. Toofan, a mafia kingpin and top terrorist of Bangladesh
    - Samriddha Pal as young Galib
  - Shanto, an aspiring actor and Toofan's lookalike
- Mimi Chakraborty as Suchana, Toofan's partner and film actress
- Masuma Rahman Nabila as Julie, a costume designer and Shanto's girlfriend
- Chanchal Chowdhury as AC Akram, a CID officer tasked with eliminating Toofan
- Misha Sawdagor as Bashir, a local gangster
- Fazlur Rahman Babu as Arifin, member of the Janata Party and Home Minister of Bangladesh
- Shahiduzzaman Selim as Shahnawaz, a village land raider
- Gazi Rakayet as Jalaluddin, Toofan's foster father and advisor
- Sumon Anowar as Talat, a top gangster operating outside of Dhaka with ambitions to establish himself in the city.
- Loknath Dey as Jamshed, Toofan's right-hand man & advisor
- A.K. Azad Shetu as a member of intelligence under Akram
- Hasnat Ripon as a member of intelligence under Akram
- Bishwajit Ghosh as Sultan, one of Toofan's personal bodyguards
- Raj Basu as Suleiman, one of Toofan's personal bodyguards
- Salahuddin Lavlu as a member of the opposition party
- Rajat Ganguly
- Gousul Alam Shaon as Rocky, an "action" director
- Adnan Adib Khan as "Hero" Raj, a film actor with superiority complex
- Manav Sachdev as Sohan Choudhary, a famous film actor of the 1990s.
- Arijit Bhusan Bagchi as a member of the Janata Party
- Pritom Hasan as a cameo appearance in the song "Laage Ura Dhura"
- Raihan Rafi as a cameo appearance in the song "Laage Ura Dhura"

== Production ==
=== Pre-production ===
In October 2022, after wrapping up the filming of Shakib Khan's Leader: Amie Bangladesh, director Raihan Rafi announced the making of a film titled Premik with Shakib Khan. The director then confirmed that the film's shooting would begin in December that year. Almost a year later in September 2023, Channel i confirmed that the film will not be produced due to unspecified reason. The newspaper also confirms that Chorki, Alpha-I and Shree Venkatesh Films has planned to co-produce a film jointly, slated for release on Eid al-Adha 2024. Initially it was reported in the media that Khan will be acting in a film titled Avineta directed by Raihan Rafi, later Channel i confirmed that the films is not titled Avineta but Toofan. Then on December 11, 2023, through a press conference in Dhaka, production companies Chorki, Alpha-i and SVF officially announced the name of the film as Toofan and Shakib Khan as the lead actor under the direction of Raihan Rafi, which is their first collaboration.

The pre-production work of the film began in the first week of January 2024. The film's director Raihan Rafi went to Chennai, India to select the shooting location in the same month. On April 13, 2024, Shakib Khan went to India to participate in the shooting of the film.

=== Development ===
The construction of the set for the shooting of the film at Ramoji Film City began in the first week of January, where a total of 4 huge sets will be constructed with 100 people working daily. The director confirmed with Kaler Kantho that it would take around two months to make the 4 shooting sets. Rafi confirmed that the sets of this film were built by the same technician who built the sets of the South Indian film franchise Baahubali. A big budget of the film was spent on the set construction. It was reported that Bangladesh of the nineties will be highlighted in those sets. Cars, trains and even roads of the 90s can be seen in the film. Three major cities of the nineties of the country will be brought up in the film along with various events that happened there.

The screenplay for the film was written by Adnan Adib Khan, cinematography was done by Tahsin Rahman, art direction by Shihab Nurun Nabi, and costumes were designed by Farzana San.

=== Casting ===
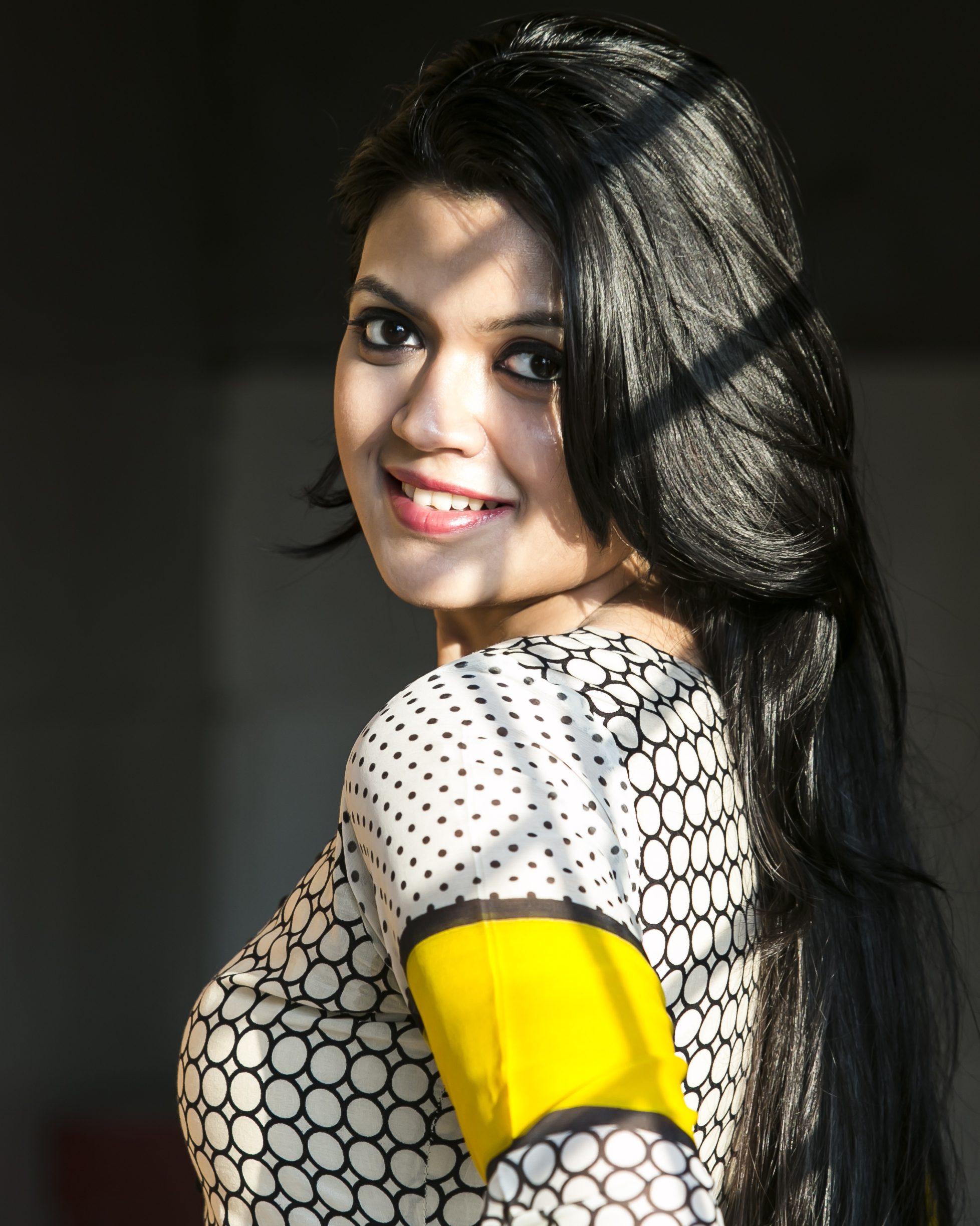
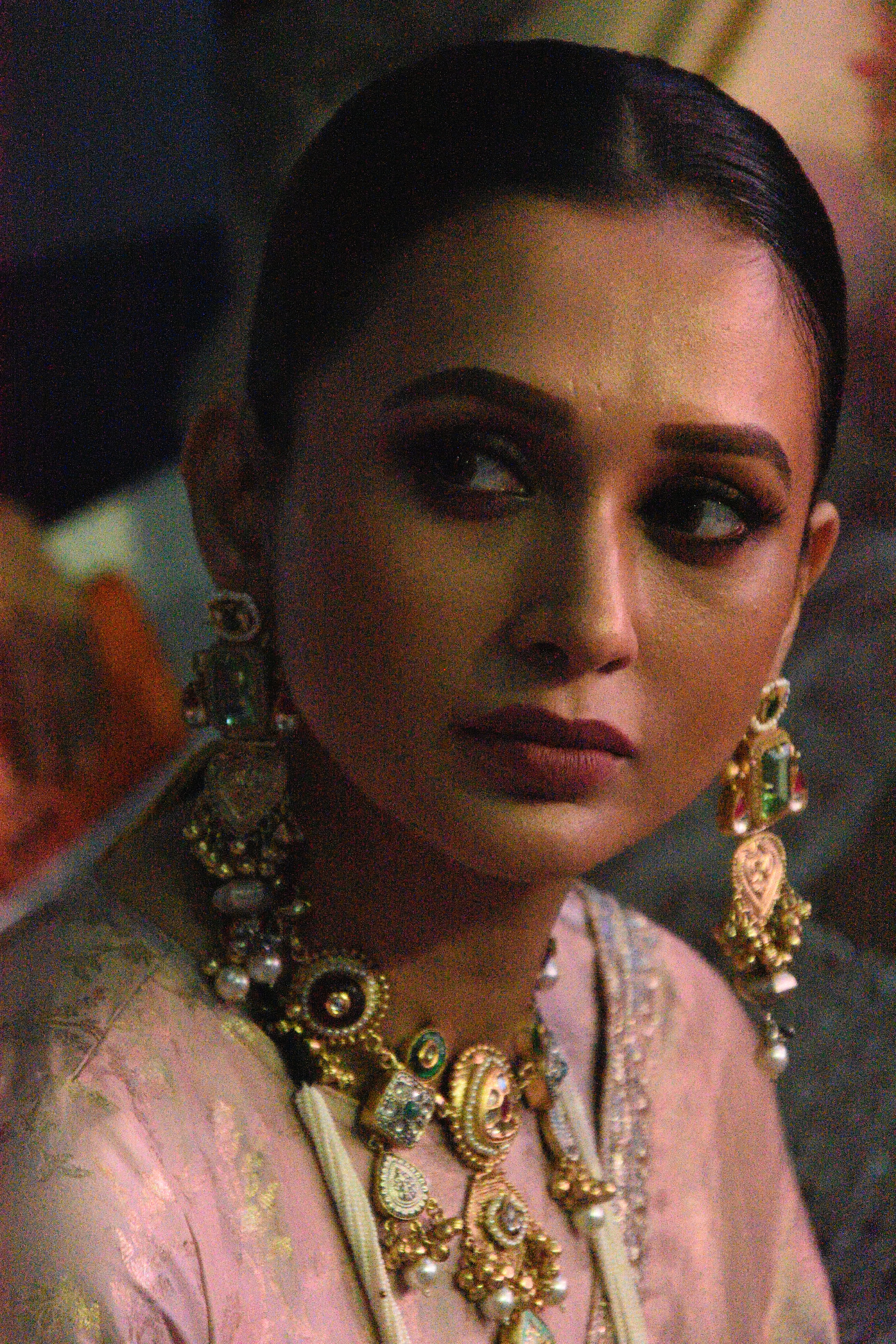
Masuma Rahman Nabila (left) and Mimi Chakraborty (right) were signed for the female lead roles, pairing opposite Shakib Khan for the first time.
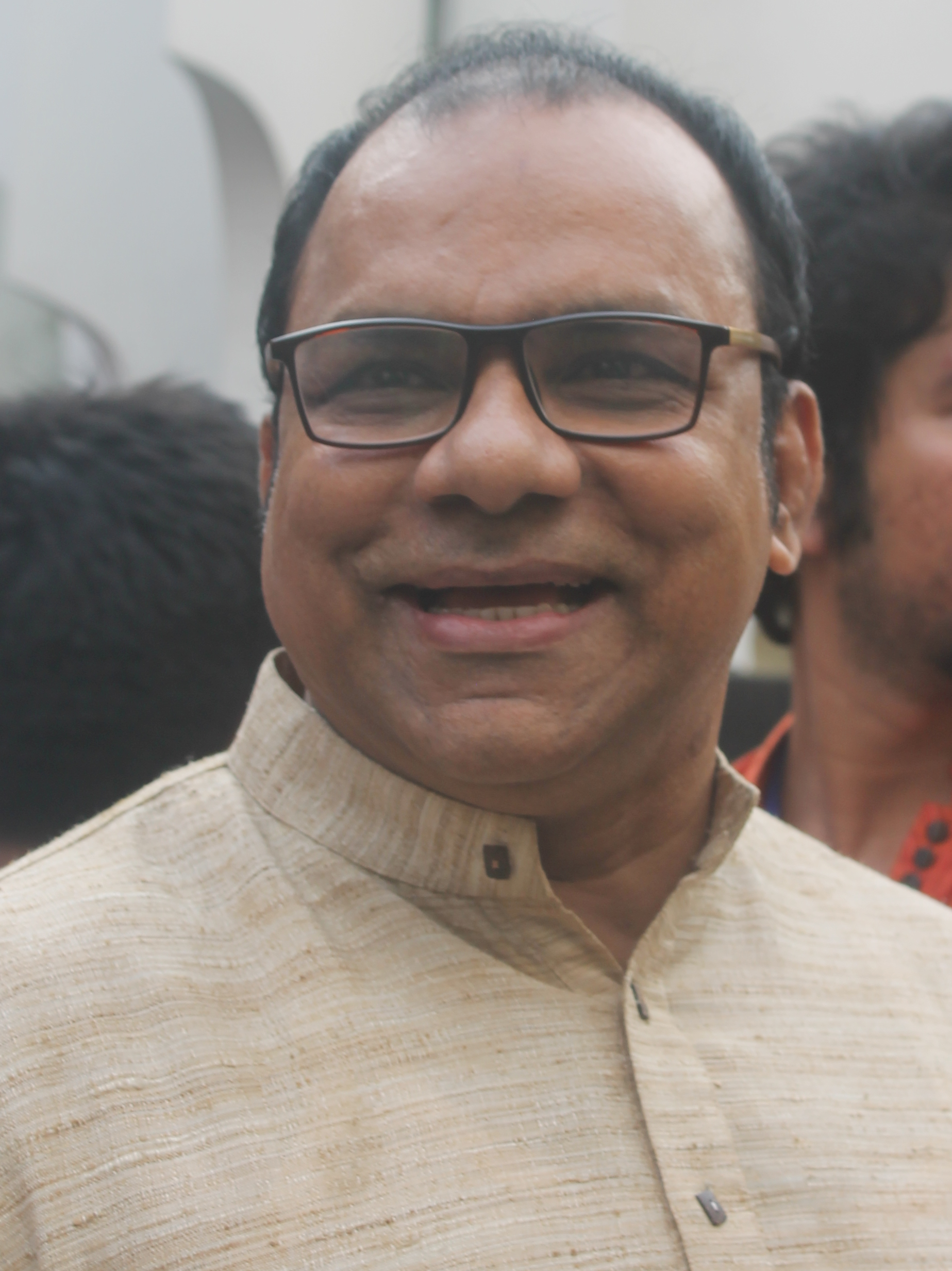
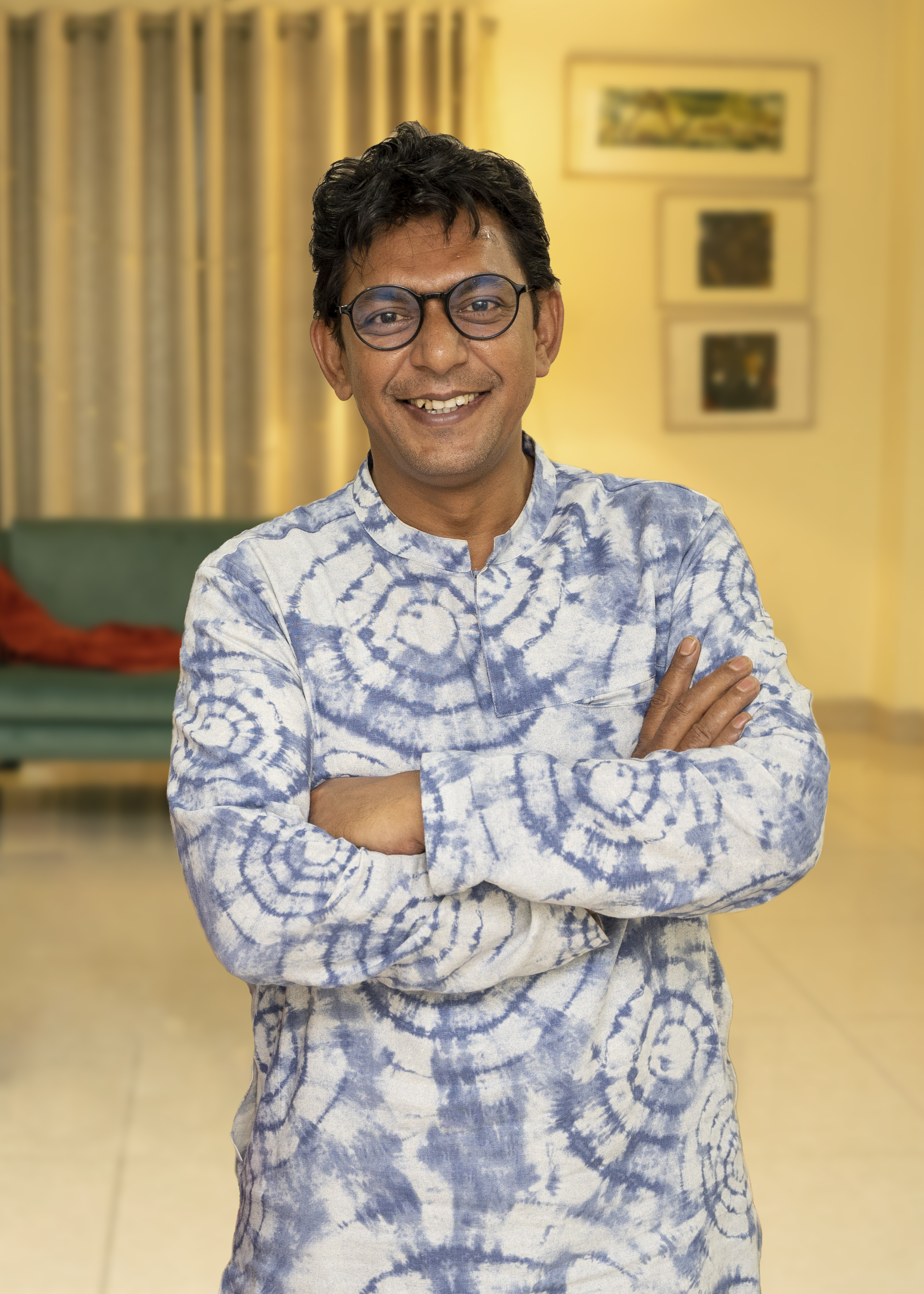
Misha Sawdagor (L) will play the local villain in the film, while Chanchal Chowdhury (R) played the role of AC Akram, a CID officer tasked with eliminating Toofan

Initially, Nusraat Faria was rumored to be the lead actress of the film. Later on Meril Cafe Live of Prothom Alo, she confirmed that she is not in the film. Later in February 2024, Samakal reported that alongside Indian actress Mimi Chakraborty, as well as Madhumita Sarcar's name was also rumored to be the female lead. However, the producer of the film denied it at the time. The film's production company Alpha-i Studios Ltd., SVF and Chorki revealed in a press release that the two actresses of the film is Mimi Chakraborty and Masuma Rahman Nabila. It is reported that both of them will be playing as the lead female roles, both of them will perform opposite Khan for the first time. There is another rumor that Indian actor Jisshu Sengupta will play the villainous character in the film, later, The Daily Star confirmed that he will be played as lead villain in the film. According to a report of Anandabazar Patrika, initially Bangladeshi actor Afran Nisho was reportedly offered the role of the villain in the film. But as he did not agree to do play the role, the makers later offered Sengupta. In late April 2024 Samakal reported that, it was rumored that Chanchal Chowdhury would be playing a guest role as the villain in the film. Later the same week, Chorki confirmed in a press release that Chanchal Chowdhury will play a special role in the film, which will be the first collaboration between Khan and Chowdhury. At the same time, prominent Bangladeshi actor Fazlur Rahman Babu was also signed for the film, which he confirmed to Jugantor. United News of Bangladesh also reported that Shahiduzzaman Selim, Gazi Rakayet, AK Azad Setu and Hasnat Ripon will cast some important characters in the film.

=== Characterization ===
Shakib Khan played the role of a Bangladeshi gangster of nineties in the film.

=== Filming ===
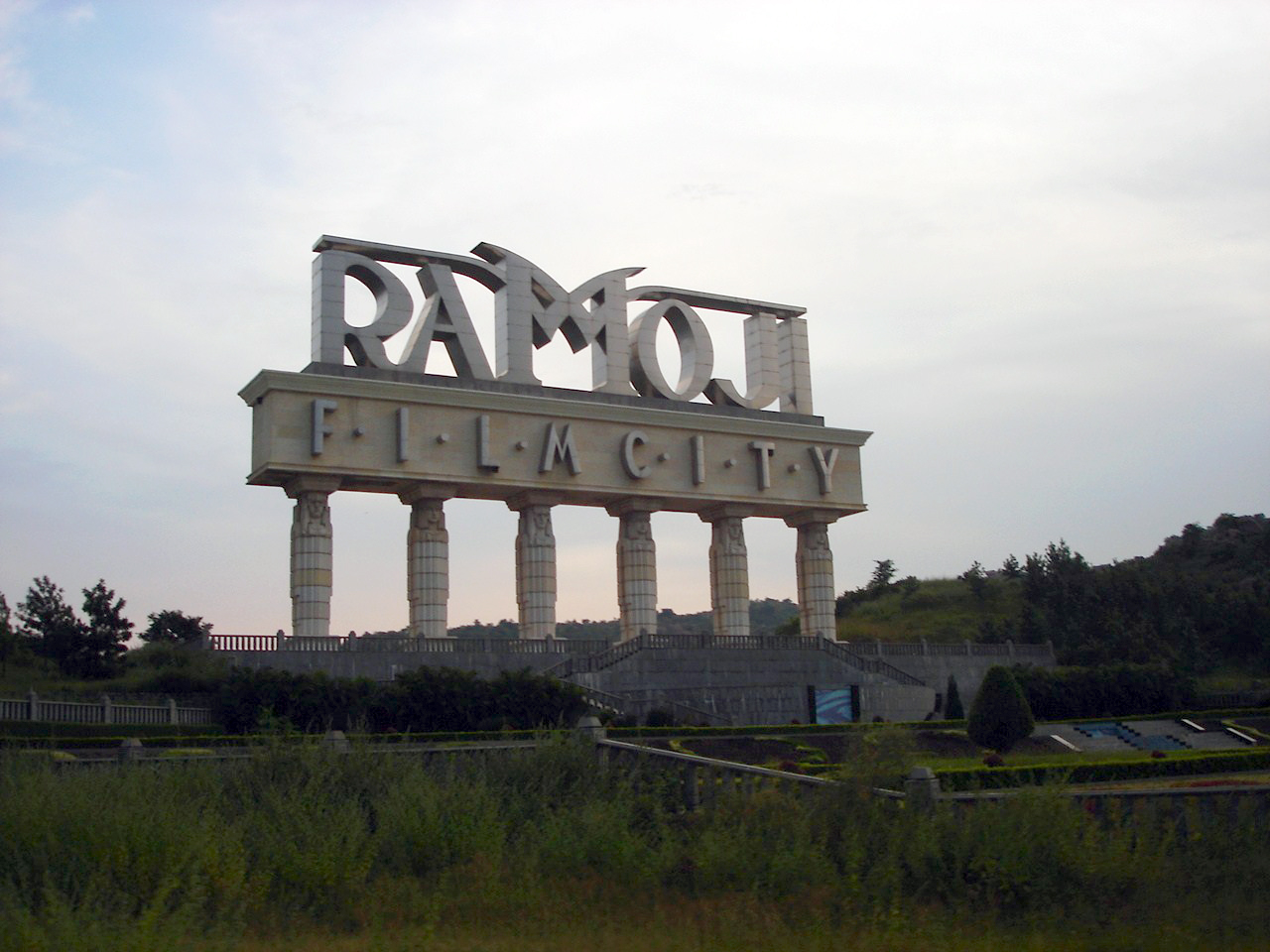
Ramoji Film City in Hyderabad, where 90's Bangladesh is depicted.

Initially, the film was supposed to begin filming in India from March 20, 2024, which confirmed by The Daily Star. Subsequently, the principal photography of the film was commenced on April 15, 2024, in India. The films antagonist Chanchal Chowdhury went to India to participate in the filming on April 25. On the same day he participated in the filming. As of April 28, both Shakib Khan and Chowdhury have shot several scenes together. After the release of the trailer teaser, the director told Samakal that the majority of the film's shooting has already been completed. The film was wrapped up on May 26, 2024, with a 41-days (Note: Some of source says it is 40 days) filming in India. The protagonist also returned to country after the complete of filming as well as his dubbing, on the same day.

== Themes and influences ==
The plot of Toofan revolves around an underworld mafia in the nineties. According to director Raihan Rafi, the story is inspired by the life of a gangster in 1990s Bangladesh, promising a brutal action film. He stated that such a film has never been made in Bangladesh, with Khan taking on the role of a gangster.

== Marketing ==
The announcement poster of the film was released through a press conference on December 11, 2023. 5 pre-production miniature stills were revealed on January 9, 2024, with one of the stills used the poster of renowned Bangladeshi actor Salman Shah's Moha Milon. The first glimpse of the film was revealed on March 27, 2024, coinciding with Shakib Khan's 45th birthday. The promotional image portrayed Shakib Khan seated in an armchair, smoking a cigarette, with a Kalashnikov rifle resting against the chair. A 1 minutes 21-seconds teaser trailer, titled "Toofani Tease" was released on May 7, 2024, which received mostly positive response from the audience and critics, with a wide criticism for plagiarism from Indian films KGF and Animal (2024). It crossed over 10 million views in just 24 hours across social media, which is a milestone in the history of Bengali films, which also considered as one of the best teaser of Khan's career. The first official poster of the film, titled "Toofani Poster", was unveiled four days after the release of the official teaser on April 11. Four fan-made posters went viral across social media, which were praised by the film's director. The official trailer for the film was released on June 15, 2024. The trailer received widespread acclaim, especially for Khan's presence, which earned significant appreciation from netizens.

Mimi Chakraborty arrived in Dhaka on June 13, 2024, as the part of the promotional campaign for the film release in Bangladesh. Later that evening, she attended a press conference in Dhaka, where the entire film team was present. On July 4, 2024, a press conference called Toofan Press Meet in Kolkata was held for the release of the film in India, attended by the director and lead actors. Later that same day, the film's premiere show took place at South City Mall in Kolkata.

== Music ==
Toofan

Soundtrack album by Pritom Hasan, Arafat Mohsin and Naved Parvez
- Recorded: 2024
- Studio: SVF
- Genre: Feature Film Soundtrack
- Language: Bengali
- Labels: SVF; Chorki; Alpha-i
- Producers: Pritom Hasan; Arafat Mohsin; Naved Parvez

Pritom Hasan chronology
Damal (2022)	Toofan (2024)	Borbaad (2025)

Arafat Mohsin chronology
Surongo (2023)	Toofan (2024)	Borbaad (2025)

Naved Parvez chronology
Omar (2024)	Toofan (2024)

Singles from Toofan
- 1. "Laage Ura Dhura" Released: 28 May 2024; 2. "Toofan Theme" Released: 05 June 2024; 3. "Dushtu Kokil" Released: 20 June 2024

The film's first track, "Laage Ura Dhura," was released on May 28, 2024, coinciding with the silver jubilee of Shakib Khan's career. The chorus tune of the song is adapted from Matal Razzak Dewan's song "Morar Kokiley," written by Sharif Uddin. The rest of the lyrics were written by Rasel Mahmud, with the tune and music arrangement by Pritom Hasan. The song is sung by Pritom Hasan and Debosree Antara, and was included in the film to fit the 1990s timeline. Pritom Hasan and director Raihan Rafi made cameo appearances in the song. The second singles of the film Toofan Theme, was released on June 5, 2024, and was performed by Arif Rahman Joy, with Samybrata Dripto contributing backing vocals with additional rap was done by Rapsta Dadu. The music composed, arrange and backing vocal design were handled by Naved Parvez, while the lyrics were penned by Tahsan Shubho, both of them had previously collaborated with director Raihan Rafi on the title track of his third directorial Poran (2022). The song received widespread acclaimed right after its release. Along with the vocals, lyrics, and tune, what impressed both audiences and critics the most was the way Shakib Khan was portrayed as a larger-than-life character on screen.

Maskawath Ahsan of Amader Shomoy highlights the songs and soundtrack of Toofan as essential elements that elevate the film's commercial appeal. He commends the choreography, music, and visual presentation, stating that these aspects align well with the film's intent to entertain. The songs are integrated seamlessly, contributing to the energy of the film and enhancing its appeal to a mass audience. Ahsan suggests that such well-executed musical elements reflect the technical competence of the production, making Toofan a strong commercial venture. Rabbani Rabbi of Independent TV noted that Toofan's soundtrack adds vibrancy to the film. It features both romantic songs and upbeat item numbers, successfully maintaining a mood of romance and entertainment. The lively "item songs" are particularly highlighted for stirring excitement among the audience.

No.	Title	Lyrics	Music	Singer(s)	Length
1.	"Laage Ura Dhura"	Rasel Mahmud, Shorif Uddin	Pritom Hasan, Razzak Dewan	Pritom Hasan, Debosrie Antara	2:45
2.	"Toofan Theme"	Tahsan Shuvo	Naved Parvez	Arif Rahman Joy, Rap: Rapista Dadu	2:13
3.	"Dushtu Kokil"	Akassh	Akassh	Dilshad Nahar Kona, Akassh	3:39
4.	"Pheshey Jaai"	Tonmoy Pervez	Arafat Mohsin	Habib Wahid	2:34
5.	"Ashbe Amar Din"	Robiul Islam Jibon	Arafat Mohsin	Rehaan Rasul	2:58
Total length:					14:49

== Release ==
=== Theatrical release ===
The film was released on 17 June for the occasion of Eid al-Adha 2024. On 17 June 2024, the movie was released in 129 theaters on Holiday Eid al-Adha, clashing with Rashid Palash's Moyurakkhi, Mostafizur Rahman Manik's Dark World, Sumon Dhar's Agontuk and Mohammad Iqbal's Revenge. The film got no objection clarification without any cuts with 145 minutes on June 5, 2024.

A special screening of the film was held on June 24 at Sony Cineplex, Dhaka. Along with the cast and crews of the film, the event was attended by several guests, including actor Arifin Shuvoo, Azizul Hakim, Yash Rohan, and other prominent figures of Bangladeshi films industry.

On June 28, 2024, the film was simultaneously released in over 100 theaters across 15 countries, including the United States, Canada, Australia, the United Kingdom, and France and it was released in India on the 5th of the following month.

On September 13, 2024, the film was released in Hindi dubbed as the same title in Bihar, India. It was released in Pakistan on November 1, 2024, marking the first Bangladeshi film to be dubbed in Urdu and shown in Pakistan. It premiered on 128 screens simultaneously, making it the most wider released for a Dhallywood film in Pakistan since 1971.

=== Streaming ===
On September 1, 2024, in two separate press releases, Streaming platforms Chorki and Hoichoi announced that the film would be released on their respective platforms. Later, on September 10, they confirmed that the film would be released simultaneously on both platforms, with viewers in Bangladesh able to watch it on Chorki and those in India on Hoichoi. On the 19th of the same month, the film was released on both platforms simultaneously. To celebrate the film's release on OTT, several play packs have been designed as part of a special offer by Grameenphone for customers, allowing viewers to watch the film.

The film was screened at the 23rd Amar Bhashar Chalachitra Utsab 1431, one of the largest Bengali-language film festivals organized by the Dhaka University Film Society in remembrance of the Language Martyrs. It was later premiere on Deepto TV on April 1, 2025, coinciding with Eid al-Fitr.

=== Distribution ===
The film was distributed in the United States by Bioscope Films, while Bangoz Films handled its distribution in Australia and New Zealand.

=== Pre-release business ===
A day before its release at Modhuban Cineplex, advance tickets for the first two days were sold out, a phenomenon last seen in 2022 with the release of the film Hawa.

Shortly after advance tickets were released online, all branches of Star Cineplex sold out the first day's tickets within a few hours. For the second day, 80% of the tickets were sold online as well.

The film has set a record for advance ticket sales in Australia, with over 2,000 tickets sold 10 days prior to its release. No other Bengali film has achieved this before. Previously, the highest advance ticket sales in Australia were for Raihan Rafi's Poran, which sold 800 tickets in advance.

=== Online piracy ===
Within three days after its release on streaming platforms, the film was pirated and quickly spread online. From September 22, 2024, it began circulating across various Facebook, YouTube, and Telegram groups, with a runtime of 138 minutes, which clearly showing the Chorki logo. The film had previously been a victim of piracy during its theatrical run as well. However, swift action by the authorities at the time led the successful removal of pirated copies from various sites.

== Reception ==
=== Critical response ===
Critic Rabbani Rabbi on Independent TV praised Toofan for its powerful performances, particularly Shakib Khan's dual role and the strong supporting cast. While the film draws inspiration from movies like KGF and Salaar, it still stands out with its engaging storyline and impressive action scenes. However, it slightly falters in narrative consistency. He gave the film a rating of 3.8/5. Film critic and journalist Ahsan Habib point out that the film Toofan, explores a familiar storyline of crime and revenge, glamorizing violence and using clichéd lines like "society creates killers." While the film features strong performances from Shakib Khan and Chanchal Chowdhury, it suffers from inconsistencies and similarities to other films, notably in its portrayal of Shakib Khan's character. Despite these flaws, Toofan is smartly executed and hints at a sequel. He give the film 6 out 10 stars. Critic Shadique Mahbub Islam from The Business Standard gave the film a rating of 3.5/5. He noted that Toofan impresses with its thrilling sequences, Shakib Khan's dedication, and standout performances from Chanchal Chowdhury and the supporting cast. While the film draws inspiration from Indian cinema, it stands out for its visual appeal, though it suffers from a weak, inconsistent plot and underdeveloped character arcs. In a review in Prothom Alo, Towheed Feroze highlighted Shakib Khan's impressive dual portrayal of the fierce Toofan and the innocent Shanto. Despite the film draws inspiration from popular titles and has sparked debates over its themes, Feroze commended its energetic storytelling, viral tracks, and Khan's commanding performance, marking it as a significant revival for the Bangladeshi cinema landscape. Ahnaf Tahmid Fahid of The Financial Express praised the film as a "cinematic storm," highlighting Khan's "mesmerizing" performance as the ruthless gangster. Fahid noted the film's strong direction and visuals but felt the story lacked depth and clarity regarding Toofan's motives. Despite this, he recommended the film as an action-packed entertainer. Shumona Sharmin Sharna of The Business Post the film as a "cinematic triumph," praising Khan's dual role and Raihan Rafi's expert direction. She highlighted the film's technical strengths but pointed out its lack of Bangladeshi authenticity and underutilized supporting cast. Despite these critiques, Sharna emphasized that Toofan is an engaging, high-budget spectacle that keeps audiences hooked. Purnia Samia of The Daily Ittefaq described Toofan a "cinematic revolution". She praised Khan's powerful performance and Mimi Chakraborty's charm, noting the film's stunning visuals and entertainment value. Despite minor character depth issues, she lauded the film as a groundbreaking moment for Bangladeshi cinema.

Shababa Iqbal of Ice Today called Toofan a "gory, racy thriller", praising Khan's "convincing dual role" and strong editing and cinematography that intensify the film's climax. Despite a "garbled storyline", Khan's performance kept Toofan gripping till the end. Maskawath Ahsan of Amader Shomoy was more positive about the film for its "sound technical execution" but noted that its content fell short in delivering a nuanced story. "The film excels in its visuals, costume design, and choreography, making it a successful commercial production," he wrote, adding that Toofan reflects the technical strengths of Dhallywood. However, Ahsan criticized the film's narrative for leaning into themes of toxic masculinity and power dynamics, which detracted from its overall message. "It’s a film made purely for entertainment, best enjoyed without overthinking the content," he concluded. Dr. Hossne Ara Jolly, Dean of Arts at Jagannath University, critiqued the film as "disturbing" and "destructive." She remarked, "The film glorifies violence in a way that could negatively influence young minds, especially in today’s rising gang culture." While praising its production quality, Jolly also criticized the film for its chaotic storyline and excessive brutality, stating that it promotes lawlessness rather than meaningful entertainment.

Aaro Ananda of ABP praised Toofan for Shakib Khan's larger-than-life dual performance as both gangster Toofan and actor Shanto, alongside Chanchal Chowdhury's standout portrayal of AC Akram. While the film excels in action sequences and provides good entertainment, it falters slightly in fully utilizing its talented female cast. Despite its flaws, the film remains engaging and visually appealing. The critic gave the film a rating of 3/5. Sayani Rana of Hindustan Times awarded the film a 3.0/5 rating. He praised the film for its intense performances, especially Shakib Khan's portrayal of both Shanto and the ruthless Toofan. The film borrows elements from classic gangster movies, with nods to Don and Animal, but still manages to stand out with its brutal narrative and gritty action sequences. However, despite the strong performances, the film falters in character depth and lacks consistency in its 90s setting. Poorna Banerjee of The Times of India gave the film a 3.0/5 rating, praising the film for its racy, action-packed narrative and highlighted Shakib Khan's commanding performance in his 250th film. The movie borrows elements from classics like Don, KGF and Animal, while the two main songs and dialogue references evoke 90's Bangladeshi pop culture. Though the film suffers from a lack of character development and a somewhat garbled storyline, it thrives on sharp editing and excellent cinematography, particularly in the thrilling second half. Despite its absurdities, Khan's portrayal of both the ruthless Toofan and innocent Shanto makes the film a fun watch. Atindra Danyadari of Anandabazar Patrika rated the film 6 out of 10, calling it a film that prioritizes entertainment over logic. She noted it combines action and comedy, stating, "It offers pure entertainment without aiming for realism." Danyadari praised the performances and cinematography, emphasizing that the film's goal is to provide a delightful cinematic experience. Bidisha Chattopadhyay of Sangbad Pratidin called Toofan "thrilling," praising it for its bold action and performances. "Watching Toofan, I was reminded of the impact of Don and Animal," she said, noting that like those films, Toofan "brings a fresh wave of high-octane entertainment." She added that the film is "not just a thrilling action ride but also a showcase of modern Bangladeshi cinema's potential" with a compelling anti-hero and a visually dynamic narrative. ETV Bharat gave the film a positive review, commended the film for its thrilling entertainment, calling it "a high-octane action drama" with a familiar storyline. "The film evokes memories of classics like Don and Animal," they observed, highlighting that despite "predictable characters and a disjointed plot," Khan's dual portrayal of Toofan and Shanto adds "vibrancy and excitement." While the narrative "falls short in depth and character exploration," the reviewer stressed that Toofan remains "a captivating watch" from start to finish. Anuska Ghatak of IWMBuzz rated the film 4 out 5 stars. She praised the film as an "adrenaline-pumping" action thriller with Shakib Khan delivering a "standout performance" in both roles. While the story "lacks logic," she noted its "high entertainment value" and praised the action, cinematography, and supporting cast, especially Chanchal Chowdhury as ACP Akram. Shamayita Chakraborty of OTTPlay gave the film 2.5/5 stars, criticizing its "abysmal storyline" and lack of character development. Despite Shakib Khan's effort, the film "borrows heavily" from Don, Animal, and KGF, but fails to deliver a coherent plot. Chanchal Chowdhury and the songs Dushtu Kokil and Laage Ura Dhura stand out, though they arrive too late to save the film.

Leon Overee of Asian Movie Pulse described the film as "an engaging and entertaining thriller." He praised Khan's magnetic dual performance and Raihan Rafi's stylized direction, noting the film's gritty visuals and commercial appeal. Despite minor absurdities and derivative elements, he hailed it as a bold and impactful entry in Bangladeshi cinema.

=== Box office ===
In just two and a half days after its release, the film sold tickets worth ৳1.20 crore at Star Cineplex alone. The film earned ৳20 crore in its opening week and according to a report of Channel i and Independent Television, the film grossed ৳25 crore (US$2.0 million) in its first ten days. In its third week of release, Toofan performed strongly at the box office, going housefull in the highest number of theaters across Bangladesh. As a result, by the end of the third week, the film grossed over ৳35 crore (US$2.9 million). The film's total collection is ৳56 crore (US$4.6 million).

After its release in India on July 5, 2024, the film failed to perform well at the box office. The Hindustan Times Bangla reported, citing Sacnilk, that the film earned ₹7 lakh in its first five days in India.

On June 28, 2024, the film was released in 19 theaters across the United States. After its release, the film earned more than US$120,000 in just 12 days, marking a milestone for Bangladeshi films released in the United States.

== Awards and nominations ==
Meril-Prothom Alo Awards

Awards	Date of Events	Category	Section	Recipients	Results	Ref
Meril-Prothom Alo Awards	23 May 2025	Best Film Actor	Popular choice	Shakib Khan	Won	
Meril-Prothom Alo Awards	23 May 2025	Best Male Singer	Popular choice	Pritom Hasan – "Laage Ura Dhura"	Won	
Meril-Prothom Alo Awards	23 May 2025	Best Female Singer	Popular choice	Dilshad Nahar Kona – "Dushtu Kokil"	Won	

== Sequel ==
The film's post-credits scene showcased the continuation of the story with a cliffhanger and the title for the second part revealed as Toofan 2. Initially director Raihan Rafi has informed that the film's sequel, Toofan 2 is in development and is expected to be released on Eid al-Fitr 2025. On October 2, 2024, during the announcement of a new project of director with Indian actor Jeet, titled Lion (2025), the film's director hinted in a Facebook post that the sequel, would be released on Eid al-Adha in 2025. However, the film's lead actor, Shakib Khan, denied this, stating that the film would not be released on Eid al-Adha in 2025.

== Controversies ==
After the announcement poster of the film was revealed, it faced wide criticism for copying the American film John Wick: Chapter 2, which is very similar to John Wick: Chapter 2 film poster. Just as Keanu Reeves is seen in the poster of John Wick: Chapter 2, Shakib Khan also seen in the poster of Toofan.

Upon the release of its teaser, the film faced accusations of copying looks from Ranbir Kapoor's film Animal and Yash's look from KGF Additionally, there were rumors that the story of Toofan was also copied from KGF. These claims were debunked by both the director and producer.

The Bangladesh Film Censor Board has accused the film's production company of showing the teaser "Toofani Tease" in theaters without any censor clearance. The Bangladesh Film Censor Board alleges that the film Toofan is proceeding without adherence to regulations.

It was initially reported that the film was a joint production between India and Bangladesh, with Shree Venkatesh Films from India and Chorki and Alpha-i Studios Ltd. from Bangladesh as producers, which was covered in various newspapers across Bangladesh and India. (Note: Multiple sources) However, when the film was submitted to Bangladesh Film Censor Board, only Alpha-i Studios Ltd. was listed as the sole production company. Leaders from 19 film-related organizations at BFDC later raised concerns about the production process and funding behind Toofan. (Note: Multiple sources)

== Impact ==
The film broke all 20-year records at Star Cineplex by screening a maximum of 58 shows simultaneously.

Due to overwhelming audience demand, a special screening of the film was held at 12 AM on June 18, 2024, at Chhayabani Cinema in Mymensingh, an exceptional event that hadn't occurred in Bangladesh in the past 20 years.

== See also ==
- List of Bangladeshi films of 2024
