= Khalid Hassan Milu =

Bangladeshi musician (1960–2005)

Khalid Hasan Milu
- খালিদ হাসান মিলু
- Born: 6 April 1960; Backergunge District, East Pakistan, Pakistan
- Died: 29 March 2005 (aged 44); Dhaka, Bangladesh
- Resting place: Mirpur, Dhaka, Bangladesh
- Occupation: Singer
- Spouse: Fatema Hasan Palash (m. 1986)
- Children: 2, including Pritom Hasan
- Relatives: Zayed Khan (nephew)
- Musical career
- Years active: 1980–2005
- Award: Bangladesh National Film Award for Best Male Playback Singer (1994)

Khalid Hassan Milu (6 April 1960 – 29 March 2005) was a Bangladeshi singer. He received the Bangladesh National Film Award for Best Male Playback Singer for his performance in the film Hridoy Theke Hridoy (1994). He rendered 1,500 songs and performed playback in about 400 films.

== Early life ==
Khalid Hassan Milu was the youngest among his four brothers and two sisters. He was inspired by his father, Modasser Ali Mia, he started his career by playing his harmonium. He had a band called Spartan in Khulna before moving to Dhaka. He was trained by Robin Das, Souresh Das and a few other people. At the very start of his career, he moved to Khulna with his elder brother where he started a band called Spartan.

Although it's known that Khalid Hasan Milu birthday was April 6, his son Pritom has said on his then-girlfriend Shahtaj Monira Hashem's show Weblife With Shahtaj on Bangla Vision that Milu was a Gemini.

== Career ==
Milu debuted his music career with the album Ogo Priyo Bandhobi in 1980. He went on to release 12 other solo albums. Among his 12 other solo albums, notable ones include Protishodh Nio, Neela, Shesh Bhalobasha, Ayna, and Manush. He had performed songs in approximately 400 films, including Shajani o Shajani, Anek Shadhonar Porey, Je Prem, and others. He received the National Film Awards in 1994 and also many other prizes, including BACHSHASH awards.

Milu performed live shows which includes him covering songs sung by Syed Abdul Hadi songs and singers such as Ferdous Wahid and Pilu Momtaz giving up their time on the stage to let Milu sing.

== Personal life ==
Milu married Fatema Hasan Palash (née Fatema Parvin Palash) on February 17, 1986. After marrying, Milu and his wife stayed at his friend Rakibus Sultan Manik's house, who was the first witness at their wedding. Together, the couple have two sons, Protic Hasan (born January 12, 1987) who is a singer and Pritom Hasan (born January 27, 1993), who is a singer, music composer, actor and model. Protic currently resides in New York with his wife Moushumi Tasfik and his daughter Pritika Hasan (b. 2023). Although Protic and Pritom are both musicians, Milu never taught his sons anything music-related. Milu wanted his sons to grow up, and then teach them music after they finished their education. But due to Milu's illness, Protic started his music career with Milu in 2004 at 17 years old. Milu performed his last song, "Jiboner Ei Anondomoy Din," on the magazine television show Ityadi with Protic, which was aired in November 2004. This is the only song they have ever sung together.

It has been rumoured that Milu had an affair with a fight attendant named Ismat Ara Tara. It has been reported that Milu married Ismat Ara Tara and abandoned his first wife, Fatema Hasan Polash, and his sons, Protic and Pritom. He was reported to live with his second wife Ismat Ara Tara at an apartment at Hope Tower and that he went back to his first wife after becoming sick. Whether this information is true or not has never been confirmed by his family or anyone he has ever worked with. Both of Milu's son have said in multiple interviews that their father was very loving towards them growing up. They have never claimed that Milu abandoned them or their mother. Protic has said in an interview that his mother could have chosen to leave Milu and move on with her life when he became sick, but she stayed by his side.

Milu was related to Zayed Khan, Sheikh Anne Rahman and Sheikh Hafizur Rahman.

== Illness and death ==
Milu was ill from 2000 to 2005. He suffered from a brain hemorrhage and reportedly visited Thailand twice and Singapore twice for treatment. Protic has said in an interview that since Milu suffered from a brain hemorrhage, he sometimes had a hard time remembering his past and dealt with confusion, including not being able to remember his wife for a short period of time, which is why Protic used to take care of Milu while he was sick. Milu was paralyzed on one side so he was told he had to walk a lot. His family found out much later that he had liver cirrhosis for a while and walking a lot damaged his liver.

It has been reported on some YouTube videos that Milu was hit on his head with a long, heavy spoon at a drummer's house during an argument which caused him to have a brain hemorrhage. Milu did not lose consciousness but he was in a lot of pain. It has also been rumored that Milu would regularly drink alcohol before becoming sick (which can cause brain hemorrhage and liver problems, especially with Milu's young age at the time). It is unknown whether these informations are true or not. Many singers who worked with Milu during his career claim that he was a calm, quiet and polite person who would never be involved in any type of conflict.

During the time he was sick, Milu and his family lived in Tongi at Safiuddin Road, where his in-laws lived. He had to stop singing while he was sick, which caused his family to financial struggle. Although his relatives helped his family while he was sick, they weren't able to afford any treatment for Milu. Pritom has said in an interview that Milu didn't receive revenue for the work he did when he needed it. If Milu received revenue, he could've gotten treatment with those funds. But instead, they had to go for charity.

Milu went to Bumrungrad International Hospital in Bangkok, Thailand for treatment on May 19, 2004 with the help of Hanif Sanket, James, Baby Naznin, Izaz Khan Swapon (Samina Chowdhury's husband), Andrew Kishore, Fakir Alamgir as well as other artists who raised funds for him. He came back to Bangladesh on 25 May 2004 after his treatment.

On March 23, 2005, Milu was admitted to Monowara Hospital. He died from liver cirrhosis on 29 March 2005, at 12:10 am. His grave is located in Mirpur, Dhaka which was given by the government. It has been reported by some fans that Milu's grave is a huge mess and that his family members don't visit his grave or hire anyone to clean up the mess. Animals such as dogs, cats and goats run around his grave, and Milu's grave isn't labelled with his name.

Right after Milu's death, Protic Hasan recorded a cover version of the song "Je Prem Sorgo Theke Ese", which was originally sung by Milu and Kanak Chapa. Protic also sang the song "Mone Pore Babake" which is dedicated to Milu. This song was written and composed by Ahmed Imtiaz Bulbul.

== Discography ==
Solo albums

- Ogo Priyo Bandhobi (1980)
- Protishodh Nio
- Neela
- Shesh Bhalobasha
- Ayna
- Manush

Films

- Ontore Ontore (1994)
- Meghla Akash (2002)
- Shajani O Shajani
- Anek Shadhonar Porey
- Je Prem
- Bhalobashar Ghor
- Praner Cheye Priyo
