= Mayaa (2024 film) =

- Poster
- Directed by: Raihan Rafi
- Written by: Raihan Rafi
- Screenplay by: Raihan Rafi; Mehedi Hasan Moon; Saiduzzaman Ahad
- Produced by: Umme Khairun Islam (Binge); Raihan Rafi
- Starring: Mamnun Hasan Emon; Sarika Sabrin
- Cinematography: Murshed Bipul
- Edited by: Simit Ray Antor
- Music by: Salman Jaim (music director); Ripon Nath (sound designer)
- Production companies: Kanon Films; Binge
- Distributed by: Binge
- Release date: 30 August 2024
- Country: Bangladesh
- Language: Bengali

Mayaa is a 2024 Bangladeshi family drama film written, directed and produced by Raihan Rafi under the banner of Kanon Films. The film stars Mamnun Hasan Emon and Sarika Sabrin in as lead role. Emon won Meril-Prothom Alo Award for Best Film Actor for his role in the film. The film was released on OTT service Binge on 30 September 2024.

== Cast ==
- Mamnun Hasan Emon as Rahat
- Sarika Sabrin as Mayaa
- Nader Chowdhury
- Rasheda Chowdhury
- Muntaha Amelia
- Sami Doha

== Production ==
Pori Moni was supposed to play the role of Mayaa, but Sarika Sabrin was ultimately chosen for this role and the film was shot in Mohammadpur, Mirpur and Badda in Dhaka.

== Reception ==
Wroted by Dainik Bangla's survey as "After the screening the film, some audience said that Mamun Emon excelled in the role of 'Rahat', many stars praised the performances of Emon and Sarika". Wroted by Prothom Alo's survey as "After the screening the film, the actors were praising their performances one after another. They had never been seen on screen like this before".

== Awards ==
Year	Awards	Category	Recipients	Result	Ref.
2025	26th Meril-Prothom Alo Awards	Best Actor (critics' choice)	Mamnun Hasan Emon	Won	
2025	26th Meril-Prothom Alo Awards	Best actress (critics' choice)	Sarika Sabrin	Nominated	
