= Local Bus =

"Local Bus (লোকাল বাস)"

Single by Pritom featuring Momtaz & Shafayat
- Released: September 2, 2016
- Genre: Folk music; hip hop
- Length: 4:00 (single) & 7:10 (music video)
- Label: Mahi's Music Company
- Songwriters: Lutfor Hasan, Golam Rabbani, Shayafat
- Producer: Gaanchill Music

"Local Bus" is a song Bangladeshi folk music Momtaz and rapper Shafayat from Jalali Set. The song was composed by Pritom and released under the banner of Gaanchill Music.

== Composition ==
This song was composed by Pritom. He likes to experiment with different genres. Local Bus was a fusion of hip-hop and folk music. It was difficult to mix folk music into hip-hop. This is the first time Momtaz worked in a digital dub step type of song.

== Release history ==
The song was in the development stage for over a year. Then, Gaanchill Music gave it a green light. The song was released with a music video on YouTube on September 2, 2016. It went viral within several hours. After 5 days, it had over half a million views on YouTube.

== Reception ==
This song was well received by almost all music listeners of Bangladesh. This was the first time Momtaz performed alongside a hip-hop artist.
