= Dil Dil Dil =

2016 Bangladeshi song

Song by Shouquat Ali Imon featuring Imran Mahmudul, Dilshad Nahar Kona

from the album Bossgiri (Original Motion Picture Soundtrack)
- Language: Bengali
- Released: 4 September 2016
- Genre: Soundtrack; Latin; World
- Length: 4:43
- Label: Lollipop
- Songwriter: Kabir Bakul
- Composer: Shouquat Ali Imon
- Lyricist: Kabir Bakul
- Producer: Khan Films

Bossgiri (Original Motion Picture Soundtrack) track listing
- 1. "Mon Toke Chara"; 2. "Dil Dil Dil"; 3. "Kono Mane Neito"; 4. "Bubly Bubly Bubly"; 5. "Bossgiri (title track)"

Music Videos
- "Dil Dil Dil" on YouTube

Dil Dil Dil is 2016 a Bangladeshi romantic song from the soundtrack of 2016 film Bossgiri, sung by Imran Mahmudul and Dilshad Nahar Kona. The song is composed by Shouquat Ali Imon with penned by Kabir Bakul. It was released on 4 September 2016 under the label of Khan Films.

== Credits and personnel ==
According to the official music video of the song on YouTube, the credits of the song are mentioned below.

- Shouquat Ali Imon – Composer
- Kabir Bakul – Lyricist
- Imran Mahmudul and Dilshad Nahar Kona – Vocal
- Adil Sheikh – Choreographer
- Tuban – DOP

== Filming ==
The song was shot mostly in Thailand.

== Receptions ==
The song generated widespread acclaim and received positive responses from both audiences and critics after its release. It is frequently performed at various events, including schools, colleges, universities, and weddings in Bangladesh. As of September 2021, the song has over 120 million views.

== Awards and nominations ==
Date	Awards	Category	Nominee	Result	Ref
21 April 2017	Meril-Prothom Alo Awards	Best Singer	Imran Mahmudul	Won	
21 April 2017	Meril-Prothom Alo Awards	Best Singer	Dilshad Nahar Kona	Won	
