= Laage Ura Dhura =

Single by Pritom Hasan featuring himself and Debosrie Antara

from the album Toofan
- Language: Bengali
- Released: 28 May 2024
- Studio: SVF
- Length: 3:14
- Label: SVF; Chorki; Alpha-i
- Composer: Pritom Hasan
- Lyricists: Rasel Mahmud, Sharif Uddin
- Producer: Pritam Hasan

Toofan track listing
- 4 tracks: 1. "Laage Ura Dhura"; 2. "Dushtu Kokil"; 3. "Ashbe Amar Din"; 4. "Ami Pheshey Jai"

Music video
- "Laage Ura Dhura" on YouTube

"Laage Ura Dhura" (Bengali: লাগে উরা ধুরা, romanized: Lāgē Urā Dhurā [laɡe uɽa d̪ʱura]; transl. Feeling uplifted or Soaring with emotions) (Note: The phrase "Laage Ura Dhura" roughly translates to a sense of being swept away emotionally or mentally, reflecting excitement or infatuation. In the context of the song from Toofan, it conveys the idea of being mesmerized or overwhelmed, particularly by someone's appearance or presence.) is a single by Bangladeshi singer-composer Pritom Hasan, featuring himself and debutant Debosrie Antara. The song is co-penned by Rasel Mahmud and Sharif Uddin and composed by Pritom Hasan with chorus credited Matal Razzak Dewan. The single is featured on the soundtrack album of the 2024 Bangladeshi film Toofan, starring Shakib Khan and Mimi Chakraborty, as their first collaboration and was included in the film to fit the timeline of the 1990s era. Composer Pritom Hasan and director Raihan Rafi have made a cameo appearance in the song.

== Background ==
At that time, Pritom Hasan was meeting with the family of Razzak Dewan to explore songs for a project of Coke Studio Bangla. The family shared several songs with Pritom, including Ma Lo Ma, which was later re-created for Coke Studio Bangla. During the conversation, they also discussed the other compositions by Matal Razzak Dewan. One of these was Tumi Kon Shohorer Maiya Go Laage Ura Dhura. The chorus tune of this song is taken from the late Matal Rajjak Dewan's famous song Morar Kokiley and was penned by Sharif Uddin, which has been voiced by legends like Momtaz Begum and Baby Naznin. The seven words Tumi Kon Shohorer Maiya Go Laage Ura Dhura deeply impressed Pritom.

Around that time, director Raihan Rafi requested Pritom to create an item song for one of his films. The concept was centered around a girl arriving from the city. Pritom instantly suggested the idea for Tumi Kon Shohorer Maiya Go Lage Ura Dhura and shared his idea with director Rafi.

Rafi frequently collaborates with lyricist Rasel Mahmud for his films, as they have a great working relationship. Pritom Hasan entrusted Mahmud with writing the new song for this time. After explaining the concept in detail, Pritom called Mahmud and said, "The chorus will be Tumi Kon Shohorer Maiya Go Laage Ura Dhura." He instructed him to build the rest of the lyrics around this core line.

The song's making was a meticulous process that took time to perfect. Director Rafi spent nearly two years working on the film, and he had been thinking about the song from the pre-production phase. As Rafi described it, "I wanted a song that would make the entire country go wild, something everyone could dance to—regardless of age. That's why we kept waiting to get everything just right. It took four months to finalize the lyrics, tune, and musical arrangement."

Pritom Hasan told Prothom Alo about the song,

It's a folk-fusion item song with dance beats. Audiences of all kinds will enjoy it.

— Pritom Hasan, composer,

== Release ==
The song teaser was revealed on May 25, 2024, which has sparked controversy over allegations of the chorus tune bearing resemblance to other songs. Concerns have been raised by numerous individuals, suggesting possible similarities with songs like Morer Kokiley and Bandobi Lolita. In response to these claims, the makers have taken steps to address the issue by providing appropriate credit in the video description. The song was released on May 28, 2024, as the first track of the soundtrack, coinciding with the silver jubilee of Shakib Khan's career.

== Credits and personnel ==
Credits adapted from YouTube.

- Pritom Hasan, Matal Razzak Dewan – composer
- Rasel Mahmud, Sharif Uddin – lyricist
- Pritom Hasan, Debosrie Antara – Voiced
- Pritom Hasan – Programming, recording
- Arafat Mohsin – Music arrangement
- Tahsin Rahman – DOP
- Shihab Nurun Nabi – Production designe
- Farzana Sun – Costume designe

== Reception ==
Shamayita Chakraborty of OTTPlay noted that the songs in Toofan added bursts of energy to the film, with Dushtu Kokil and Laage Ura Dhura emerging as standout tracks. However, she pointed out that their late entry diminished their narrative impact.

== Awards and nominations ==
Year	Events	Category	Nominee	Result	Ref
2025	26th Meril-Prothom Alo Awards	Best Male Playback Singer	Pritom Hasan	Won	

== Criticism ==
The song has faced allegations of plagiarism after the reveal of its promo on May 25, 2024. It is being claimed that the chorus part is copied from Razzak Dewan's song Amar Ghum Bhangaia Gelo Re Morar Kokile. Some had also drawn similarities with Nargis's Tangki Khali and Kajol Monir's Bandhobi Lolita.

Although, Razzak Dewan's name has also been included in the credit line of the song's description for transparency.

Sharif Uddin, the writer of the chorus, has alleged that composer Pritom Hasan used the song in the film without obtaining permission.

However, Pritom Hasan has denied the allegation in the media.

== Impact ==
Following its release on YouTube, the song quickly became one of the trending contents in Bangladesh and also became the first ever Bengali song to enter the Global Top 100 chart on YouTube. In the weekly chart it is ranked fourth.

As of mid-July, around 0.6 million reels have been created using this song on social media and has surpassed 100 million views combined on YouTube. According to a Prothom Alo report in December 2025, Laage Ura Dhura and Dushtu Kokil collectively crossed one billion views, marking a record for Bengali-language songs, while "Laage Ura Dhura" alone recorded almost 450 million views.

== Live performances ==
The song was performed live by Pritom Hasan at the 26th Meril-Prothom Alo Awards, with choreography and stage performance by the Eagle Dance Group.

== In popular culture ==
The song has been used as a form of protest in several places. In the municipal area of Thakurgaon, it was used to raise voices against the poor condition of roads and demand their prompt repair, with warnings and protests echoing the song's tune: "Kon shohorer rasta go, lage ura dhura" transl. Which city's roads feel so breathtaking? (negatively). A similar protest was held in the municipal area of Saidpur, Nilphamari district, calling for road development.
