= Priyo Maloti =

2024 Bangladeshi Bengali drama film by Shankha Dasgupta

- Release Poster
- Directed by: Shankha Dasgupta
- Screenplay by: Shankha Dasgupta; Abu Saeed Rana
- Story by: Shankha Dasgupta
- Starring: Mehazabien Chowdhury
- Cinematography: Barkat Hossain Palash
- Edited by: Saleh Sobhan Anim
- Music by: Ruslan Rehman
- Production companies: Frames Per Second; Chorki
- Distributed by: Chorki; Jaaz Multimedia
- Release date: 20 December 2024
- Running time: 119 Minutes
- Country: Bangladesh
- Language: Bengali

Priyo Maloti (alternate title: Whispers of a Thirsty River) is a 2024 Bangladeshi crime drama film. Inspired by true events, the story and screenplay were written and directed by Shankha Dasgupta. Produced by Frame Per Second in collaboration with the OTT platform Chorki, the film stars Mehazabien Chowdhury in the lead role. It follows the journey of Maloti, a woman nearing motherhood, whose life takes a tragic turn when her husband, Polash, dies in a devastating fire.

The film was released in theaters on 20 December 2024. This marked the debut of Mehazabien Chowdhury as a lead actress in a big-screen film, Shankha Dasgupta as a director and Adnan Al Rajib as a producer.

With cinematography by Barkat Hossain Palash and a fitting background score by Ruslan Rahman, the film successfully immerses the audience in the highs and lows of Malati's life. The film has received positive reviews from viewers.

== Plot ==
The film's backdrop centers around the life of Maloti Rani Das, a struggling lower-middle-class Hindu woman. Maloti Das and Polash Kumar Das, a young couple, embark on a new chapter of life together. They dreamed of a simple but happy home, where they would cherish everyday joys, playful moments, and exchange love as they enjoyed the colorful moments of life.

Their life was filled with simple yet sweet experiences—celebrating their wedding anniversary by cutting a cake while drifting on a boat, spending evenings together, or exchanging gifts. These little pleasures made their life beautiful. However, the rhythm of this happy life is suddenly interrupted by a tragic event. A devastating fire in a commercial building in the city turns their lives upside down.

How does this fire change their lives forever? What happens to Maloti and Polash's future? These questions slowly unfold in the film, revealing a story of struggle, love, and an indomitable will to survive.

== Cast ==
- Mehazabien Chowdhury as Maloti Rani Das
- Shahjahan Samrat as Razzak
- Rizvi Riju as Polash, Malati's husband
- Nader Chowdhury
- Azad Abul Kalam
- Somu Chowdhury
- Shaheedul Alam Sachchu
- Momena Chowdhury
- Kazi Anisul Haque Borun

== Production ==
The filming of the movie took place in various locations across the country, including Dhaka and Barisal, during September–October 2023. Iconic areas such as Sadarghat, Shankharibazar and Gulistan in Old Dhaka were used for the shoot, which added a unique touch to the film.

On 19 April 2024, the teaser of the film was released on Mehazabien Chowdhury's birthday, and the official trailer was unveiled on 14 December. The Bangladesh Film Certification Board awarded the film a 'U' certificate, confirming that it is suitable for all audiences.

== Release ==
The film was showcased at the 45th Cairo International Film Festival and the 55th International Film Festival of India. Later, it was released in 20 theaters across Bangladesh on 20 December 2024. Due to the positive reception from both audiences and critics, Star Cineplex doubled the number of screenings in its third week.

== Reception ==
Prita Parmita Nag of Prothom Alo wrote, The film Priyo Maloti, directed by Shankha Dasgupta, is a perfect transformation of reality onto the screen. Mehazabien Chowdhury's remarkable performance brings the character of Maloti to life. The struggles of a lower-middle-class family and the realities of society are skillfully depicted in the film. The cinematography, background music, and the shooting locations in Old Dhaka add to the film's authenticity and liveliness. By highlighting a strong female character and the harsh realities of life, the film is bound to leave a deep impact on the audience's heart.

== Award ==
At the 23rd Dhaka International Film Festival, the film Priyo Maloti, directed by Shankha Dasgupta and starring Mehazabien Chowdhury, was awarded the FIPRESCI Award in the Bangladesh Panorama section.
