= Sarika Sabrin =

Bangladeshi actress and model

Sarika Subrin
- সারিকা সাবরিন
- Born: 23 September 1988 (age 38); Chattogram, Bangladesh
- Occupations: Actress, model
- Years active: 2008 – present
- Spouse: Mahim Karim (m. 2014; div. 2016) Ahmed Rahi (m. 2022)
- Children: Shehrish Karim
- Awards: Bachsas Awards

Sarika Subrin (Bengali: সারিকা সাবরিন) is a Bangladeshi actress and model.

== Career ==
Subrin started her career in television play Camellia directed by Ashutosh Sujon and later acted in Rumali which was written by Humayun Ahmed and directed by Arun Chowdhury. She was a brand ambassador of BanglaLink Telecommunication.

Subrin's first opportunity to perform in the commercial of the beauty product came from Amitabh Reza Chowdhury which was the advertisement of Aromatic Beauty soap. The advertisement was on air in 2008 and earned Bachsas Awards in critics choice best female model category. After that initial breakthrough she became the brand ambassador of Singer and Aromatic. Now she is the brand ambassador of Walton and Keya and regularly works with Banglalink. She has performed in the twelve commercials of Banglalink. Apart from that she performed as a model in the advertisement of Pran, Amin Jewelers, Elite Mehendi and Walton.

== Personal life ==
Subrin married a businessman Mahim Karim on 12 August 2014. They have one daughter, Shehrish Karim. In 2016, Sarika and Mahim filed for divorce and got separated. On 2 February 2022, Sarika got married with Ahmed Rahi.

== Filmography ==
=== Web films ===
Year	Title	Role	Notes	Ref.
2022	Cafe Desire	Saira	Released on Chorki	
2024	Mayaa	Mayaa	Released on Binge	
2025	Amalnama	Bipasha	Released on Chorki	

=== Web series ===
Year	Title	Role	Notes	Ref.
2022	Zindabahar	Darothi	Released on BTV	
2026	Headline	Dolon	Released on Hoichoi	

=== Other work ===
Year	Title	Role	Notes	Ref.
2012–present	Amar Ami	Host	Talk show on Banglavision	

== Television ==
Year	Drama	Playwright & Director	Co-stars	Notes
2008	Camellia	Ashutosh Sujon		
2008	Rumali	Humayun Ahmed; Arun Chowdhury		
2009	Epar Opar	Nuzhat Alvi Ahmed	Shajal Noor	
2009	Chaya	Mohammad Riyad Hasan	Partha Barua, Badhon	
2010	Patro Chai Na	Mohon Khan	Shajal Noor, Mim, Bindu, Noushin, Nadia	
2010	Akasher Niche Manush	Choyonika Choudury	Bindu, Tahsin, Hillol, Anisur Rahman Milon, Kollan, Raisul Islam Asad, Nayeem, Ishana	
2010	Ek Line Beshi Bujhe	Sahriar Najim Joy	Sahriar Najim Joy, Mahmudul Islam Mithu, Sumon Patowari	
2010	Sesh Valobashar	Raihan Khan	Mosharraf Karim, Tinni, Hasan Masud, Arman	
2010	Odirsho Romoni	Akram Khan	Shajal Noor, Jeorge	
2011	Gendu Chora Mni.B.S		Azizul Hakim, Tumpa, Amirul HAque, Chitrolekha Guho, Al Munsur	
2011	Chena Chena Lage	B.U.Shuvo	Apurbo, Homaira Himu, Runa Khan, Doli Johur	
2011	Torongito Jibon	Khaled Mahmud Mithu	Sahed	
2011	Dhora	Ashrafi Mithu	Azad Abul Kalam, Fazlur Rahman Babu, Rani Sharkar	
2011	Akash Jora Megh	Choyonika Choudhury	Suborna Mustafa, Mimi, Shampa Reza, Shahiduzzaman Selim, Mahfuz Ahmed, Ali Jaker	
2011	Love Contest	Kaiser Ahmed	Apurbo, Farha Ruma, Jotika Joti, Alisha Prodhan	
2011	Paduka	Shokal Ahmed	Anisur Rahman Milon, Jorge, Arfan Ahmed	
2011	Bhalobashay Shob Hoy	Choyonika Choudhury	Apurbo, Wasim Khan	
2011	Radha Tumi Kar	Mohon Khan	Shajal Noor	
2011	Dui Line KOm Bujhe	Sahriar Najim Joy	Sahriar Najim Joy, Dipa Khondokar, Monalisa, Ridi Haque	
2011	Ebar Biye Korben Tini	Sheikh Selim	Mir Sabbir, Kochi Khondokar, Sharmili Ahmed	
2011	Second Hand	Zahid Hasan	Zahid Hasan	
2011	Ami Hoyto Manush Noi	Choyonika Choudhury	Arifin Shuvoo, Nayeem, Shovon	
2011	Bhalobasha Bhalobashi	S.A.Haque Olik	Riaz, Chitrolekha Guho	
2011	Jhogra Bari	Choyonika Choudhury	Apurbo, Anisur Rahman Milon	
2011	Oboseshe Natoke Porinoto	Shourojoy Choudhury	Arifin Shuvoo, Ohona, Shadhin Khoshru, Sahidul Islam Khokon	
2011	Rupok Chehara	Syed Iqbal; Ziauddin Alam	Shajal Noor, Sakif	aired on Eid-ul-Azha
2012	Jiboner Choturtho Odhyay	Sajal Ahmed; Shakhwat Hossain Manik	Abul Hayat, Deepa Khondokar, Monira Mithu	TV play, aired on Eid-ul-Azha
2012	Arman Bhai Honeymoon-e		Zahid Hasan, Nusrat Imroz Tisha	TV play, cameo, aired on Eid
2012	Chemistry	Shafiqur Rahman Shantanu; Ananya Emon	Shajal Noor	TV play, aired on Eid
2013	Genduchora			
2013	Sikandar Box Ekhon Birat Model	Sagor Jahan	Mosharraf Karim	
2013	Golpota Ek Raater Othoba Onagoto Onek Raater		Amin Khan	
2013	Pandulipir Shesher Kotha Ki Chhilo?	Shakhwat Hossain Manik	Shajal Noor	
2013	Tobuo Raat Ketey Jaye	Afzal Hossain Munna	Shajal Noor	
2013	Keno Michhe Nokshotrera	Rudra Mahfuza; Sakhawat Hossain Manik	Zahid Hasan, Abul Hayat, Doli Johur	TV play, aired on ATN Bangla
2021	Chena Mukh Ochena Thikana	Sakhawat Manik	Irfan Sajjad	a ZEE5 Drama
