= Pritom Hasan =

Bangladeshi actor, model, music director, singer

- প্রীতম হাসান
- Born: January 27, 1993 (age 33); Dhaka, Bangladesh
- Education: B.A. in English
- Alma mater: Southeast University
- Occupations: Actor; model; music director; singer
- Parents: Khalid Hassan Milu (father); Fatema Hasan Palash (mother)
- Musical career
- Years active: 2015–present

Pritom Hasan (born 27 January 1993) is a Bangladeshi singer, actor, model and music director. He is known for producing, singing, and directing songs, as well as starring in music videos. He was nominated for the Meril-Prothom Alo Award in the Best Singer category for the song "Khoka". Also he won the Meril Prothom Alo Award for Best Actor in 2022.

== Early life and education ==
Pritom was born on 27 January 1993 in Dhaka, Bangladesh, the younger of two sons of Bangladeshi singer Khalid Hassan Milu (born April 6, 1960; died March 29, 2005) and Fatema Hasan Palash (née Fatema Parvin Palash). He has an elder brother named Protic Hasan (born January 12, 1987), who is also a singer and carries their father's legacy. Protic currently resides in New York with his wife Moushumi Tasfik and their daughter Pritika Hasan (b. 2023) who was born in the US

He attended Capital Hill International School and Safiuddin Sarker Academy and College. He has also attended Gulshan Commerce College and graduated from Southeast University majoring in English.

Pritom was 12 years old when his father passed away from liver cirrhosis in 2005. Pritom and his family had moved from Purba Rampura to Tongi when his father became sick so that his relatives could assist them. In 2004, Pritom appeared on Ityadi at 11 years old where Hanif Sanket interviewed his parents about his father's illness. After his father passed away, Pritom was raised by his mother and elder brother Protic Hasan. Sometime after his father's death, Pritom and his family left Tongi.

He has been reported to be related to Zayed Khan, Sheikh Anne Rahman and Sheikh Hafizur Rahman.

It has been reported that his father had an affair with a fight attendant named Ismat Ara Tara and abandoned him and his family when Pritom was little. However, Pritom or his family members have never confirmed whether this is true or not. Pritom has said in multiple interviews that his father was extremely loving and caring towards him and his brother growing up. Pritom has also openly talked about grieving over his father's death to this day, after losing him as a preteen over 2 decades ago.

== Career ==
He started his music career in his early 20s. Although his father was a famous musician, Pritom was never interested in being a musician. He saw his brother become a musician and decided to give music composing a try in 2011. His paternal aunt Sheikh Anne Rahman bought his first computer to get started on composing. His first time singing on-screen was on Ityadi with his brother Protic in 2012, before he became a professional singer. He has also sung some covers of his father's songs.

When Pritom was younger, he said he wanted to work in the Bangladesh Army, but then decided to pursue a degree in English because he struggled with math. His first composed song, titled "Cheleti Abol Tabol Meyeti Pagol Pagol," was released in 2015. Later on, he began singing, and many of his songs gained popularity among young people.

Hasan began his acting career by starring in a short film titled "Habib Wahid: Jhor." His breakthrough performance was in Nuhash Humayun's 700 Taka, which garnered popularity. Since then he has acted in numerous music videos, short films, feature films, web content, and shows. Some of them include Khoka (short horror), Kache Ashar Oshomapto Golpo (TV), Wedding Bells (TV Miniseries), Bichhuz (TV Miniseries), YouTumor (2021 film), Pett Kata Shaw (TV Miniseries), among others.

== Personal life ==
On 28 October 2022, Pritom married Shahtaj Monira Hashem (born May 22, 1998), a Bangladeshi model, actress, singer and a talk show host, after a 5 year-long relationship with her. They met when filming for his music video Jadukor.

5 years later their wedding was held in a 5-star hotel in Srimangal, Sylhet, and was attended by several prominent figures such as filmmaker Nuhash Humayun, Safa Kabir, Sunerah Binte Kamal, and Habib Wahid. He announced his separation on October 4, 2026 after nearly a decade together.

== Selected works ==
=== Filmography ===
==== TV films ====
Year	Title	Role	Platform	Note
2018	Pizza Bhai		Bioscope	
2019	700 Taka			
2021	WTFry		Zee5	
2021	YouTumor		Chorki	
2022	Araal		Chorki	

==== TV series ====
- Wedding Bell (2019)
- Pett Kata Shaw (2022)
- Cactus (2026)

== Discography ==
=== Music video ===
- Asho Mama hey (2016)
- Local Bus (2016)
- Jadukor (2018)
- 700 Takar Gaan (2018)
- Girlfriend er Biya (2018)
- Khoka (2018)
- Bhenge Porona Ebhabe (2020)
- Morey Jak (2021)
- Shoroter Shesh Theke (2022)
- Shorgohara-Album(2022)
- Deora (2023)
- Ma Lo Ma (2024)
- Laage Ura Dhura (2024)
- Chad Mama (2025)
- Lichur Bagane (2025)

=== Albums ===
Released	Title	Genere	Label
2016	Pritom	pop/mixed	GP Music

=== Soundtrack ===
List of soundtrack and score credits
Year	Film	Director	Language	Notes	Ref.
2015	Romeo vs Juliet	Ashok Pati	Bengali	Indo-Bangladesh joint venture	
2018	Debi	Anam Biswas	Bengali		
2019	No Dorai	Taneem Rahman Angshu	Bengali		
2020	Bishwoshundori	Chayanika Chowdhury	Bengali		
2022	Shaan	M. Raahim	Bengali		
2022	Operation Sundarbans	Dipankar Dipon	Bengali		
2022	Damal	Raihan Rafi	Bengali		
2024	Toofan	Raihan Rafi	Bengali		
2025	Borbaad	Mehedi Hasan Hridoy	Bengali		
2025	Taandob	Raihan Rafi	Bengali		
