= Sadia Nabila =

Bangladeshi Australian Actress

- সাদিয়া নাবিলা
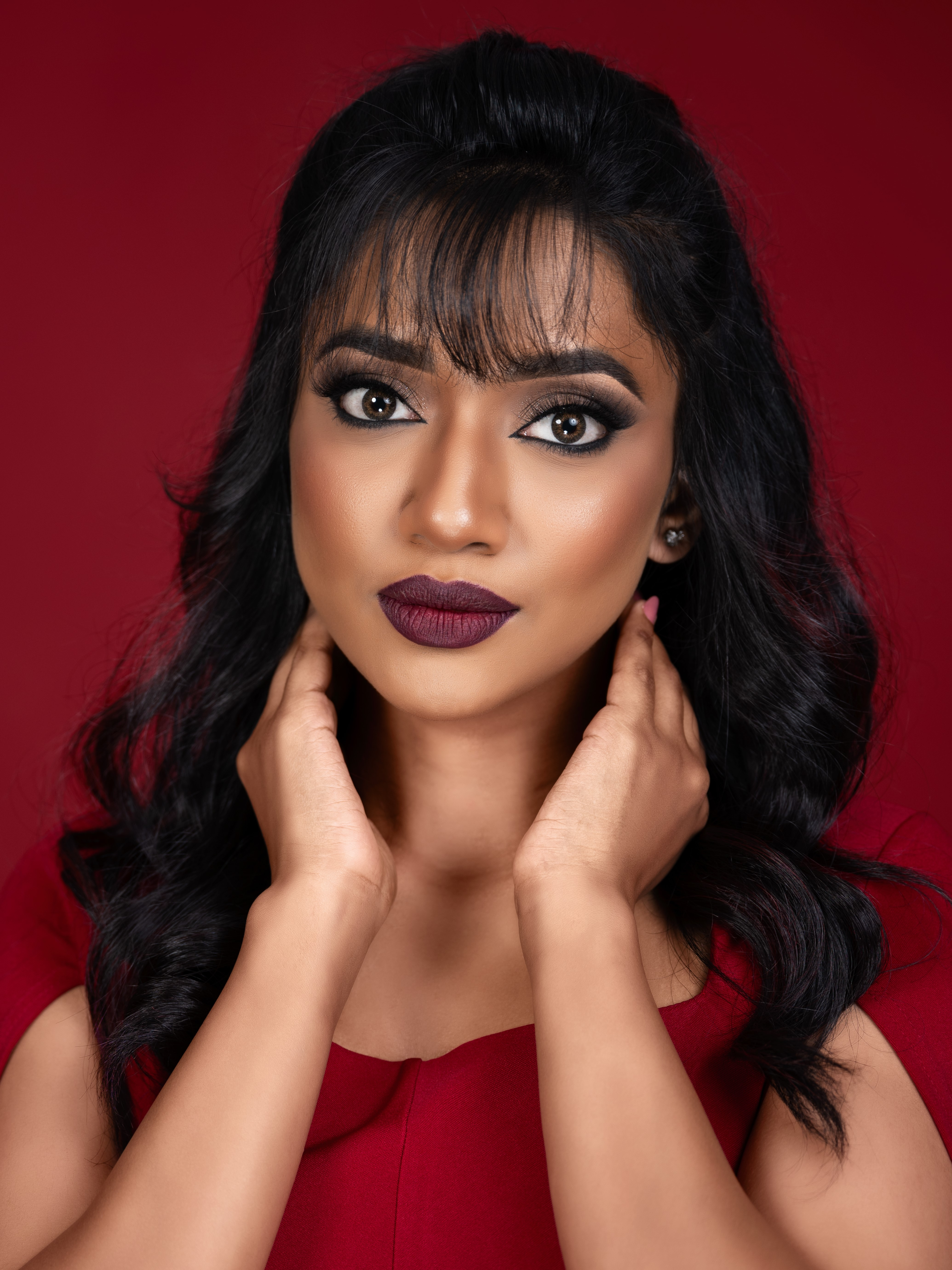
- Born: Sadia Andalib Nabila
- Occupations: Actress; model; dancer
- Known for: Mission Extreme, Pareshaan Parinda

Sadia Andalib Nabila is a Bangladeshi Australian actress and model widely known as Sadia Nabila. She is known for her Bollywood debut in Pareshaan Parinda and Bangladeshi film Mission Extreme alongside Arifin Shuvoo. She was nominated for the Best New Actress category of the Meril-Prothom Alo Awards in 2021, for her Bangladeshi debut.

== Biography ==
Sadia Nabila was born in Bangladesh. She was raised in Saidpur Cantonment, Bangladesh, as her father was in the military. She completed her higher studies at the University of Canberra in Australia after completing her schooling in Saidpur, Bangladesh.

== Filmography ==
- All films are in Bengali language, unless otherwise noted.

List of films and roles
Year	Film	Role	Notes	Ref.
2018	Pareshaan Parinda	Reena	Debut film; Hindi film	
2021	Mission Extreme	AC Era		
2023	Black War: Mission Extreme 2	AC Era / Yasmin Begum		
