= Noor (2025 film) =

Bangladeshi romantic film

- Poster
- Directed by: Raihan Rafi
- Screenplay by: Pulok Aneel; Jobaed Ahsan
- Story by: Raihan Rafi
- Produced by: Tahsin Saeed; Ishtiak Sadeeq
- Starring: Arifin Shuvoo; Jannatul Ferdous Oishee; MNU Raju; Mili Bashar
- Cinematography: Ishtiaque Hossain Pablo
- Edited by: Simit Roy Antor
- Music by: Jahid Nirob
- Production company: Quiet On Set production
- Distributed by: Tiger Media; Bioscope+
- Release date: 11 December 2025
- Country: Bangladesh
- Language: Bengali

Noor is a 2025 Bangladeshi romantic film in Bengali-language. The story and dialogues are written and directed by Raihan Rafi under the banner of Quiet On Set Productions. The screenplay is written by Pulok Aneel and Jobaed Ahsan. It stars Arifin Shuvoo and Jannatul Ferdous Oishee in the lead roles.

The film was cinematography by Ishtiaque Hossain and edited by Simit Roy Antor. The music was composed by Jahid Nirob. This is the third film of the Shuvo and Oishee duo after Mission Extreme (2021) and Black War: Mission Extreme 2 (2023).

== Cast ==
- Arifin Shuvoo as Noor
- Jannatul Ferdous Oishee as Sheuli
- MNU Raju
- Kajal
- Asif Rahman
- Somu Chowdhury
- Shirin Alam
- Mili Bashar

== Production ==
'Noor' was initially produced by Shapla Media. Later, in June 2024, the film was bought by Quiet and Set Production Company. The film was shot for about 20 days in Pabna city, Ishwardi, and Nawabganj, Dhaka. The scenes at the hero and heroine's homes were shot in Pabna itself.

== Release ==
The film was submitted to the Bangladesh Film Censor Board in July 2022. The first time, it did not receive a clearance due to objections to some scenes. Later, it was resubmitted with the necessary corrections and received a clearance by the end of that year. However, uncertainty over its theatrical release persisted and the release date was repeatedly postponed. Although the film was ultimately made for theatrical release, it was eventually released on the OTT platform Bioscope Plus. The film was released digitally on 11 December 2025.
