= Mission Extreme =

- First look poster
- মিশন এক্সট্রিম
- Directed by: Sunny Sanwar; Faisal Ahmed
- Written by: Sunny Sanwar
- Produced by: COP Creation; Mime Multimedia
- Starring: Arifin Shuvoo; Oishee; Taskeen Rahman; Sadia Nabila; Sumit Sengupta; Sudip Biswas Deep
- Cinematography: Sudipto Mazumder
- Edited by: MD Kalam
- Music by: Adit
- Production company: Cop Creation
- Release date: 3 December 2021
- Country: Bangladesh
- Language: Bengali
- Budget: ৳3 Crore

Mission Extreme is a Bangladeshi action thriller Film produced by COP Creation and Mime Multimedia. It was jointly directed by Sunny Sanwar and Faisal Ahmed. The film stars Arifin Shuvoo, Oishee, Sadia Nabila, Taskeen Rahman, Misha Sawdagor, Sumit Sengupta in lead roles. The film follows Nabid Al Shahriar, who is a member of CTTC and his fellowmates who try to wipe out insurgency in Bangladesh.

The film is set to be the first in a two film series. Initially it was scheduled to release on the occasion of Eid al-Fitr in 2020, but was postponed due to the COVID-19 pandemic. It was released in theatres on 3 December 2021.

== Plot ==
The film commences with the Soviet-Afghan War of 1979, illustrating America's endeavours to eliminate the USSR from Afghanistan and the subsequent establishment of the terrorist organisation Al-Qaeda, which would later become a significant security concern for the USA. This dynamic ultimately culminated in the events that transpired on September 11 in the United States. Subsequent to this, the terrorist organisation began to extend its influence to countries such as Iraq, India, and Bangladesh. Moreover, it is evident that extremist groups are amassing increasing levels of power, causing widespread destruction and killing millions of civilians.

The scene then transitions to Kashmir, where an extremist leader is depicted as presenting four files inscribed with numerical identifiers. Of particular significance is the 303 file, which details the events that were to unfold in Bangladesh.

== Cast ==
- Arifin Shuvoo as Nabid Al Shahriar, Additional Deputy Commissioner of Police (ADC), CTTC. Incharge of CRT (Crisis Response Team), The lead protagonist.
- Jannatul Ferdous Oishee as Sylvi, Nabid's love interest, a Journalist
- Taskeen Rahman as Khalid, The Main Antagonist
- Sadia Nabila as AC Era
- Sumit Sengupta as AC Shohid
- Sudip Biswas Deep
- Raisul Islam Asad as Dr. Afzal Asif, an atheist who was killed by Khalid.
- Fazlur Rahman Babu as Dibba Babu, ex-informer of Nabid
- Iresh Zaker
- Shahiduzzaman Selim as Police Commissioner
- Shatabdi Wadud as DC Mahabub, a Suspended officer of CTTC, Nabid's superior officer, who gave the lead of 303, he was suspended because of his unprofessional behaviour.
- Shams Sumon
- Manoj Pramanik as Rana
- Maznun Mizan as Salehin, Khalid's men.
- Misha Sawdagor as Khan, a Dubai Based Businessman, a womanizer who arranged funds for Dhaka's Bombings
- Syed Hasan Imam (actor) as Home Minister
- Laila Hasan as Nabid's Mother
- Ahsanul Haque Minu
- Shikha Khan Mou
- Aref Syed as Jayesh
- Khalid Hasan Rumi
- Mahtim Munna as Singer

== Production ==
=== Pre-production ===
After the success of Dhaka Attack (2017) in December 2018, Sunny Sarwar had announced the making of Mission Extreme. It was announced that Arifin Shuvoo would play as the protagonist of the film. In 2019, Taskeen Rahman, Jannatul Ferdous Oishee, Sadia Nabila and other actors and actresses got attached to the film as well. It will be the debut film of Miss Bangladesh Jannatul Ferdous Oishee.

=== Filming ===
The filming of the movie started from 20 March 2019. The filming occurred in Dubai too.

== Reception ==
=== Critical response ===
The Daily Star praised the movie as its one of few original films in Dhallywood, while TBS criticized the movie saying it tries too hard and the story is not thrilling. NatunNews Monitor claimed the movie to be really enjoyable, saying Arefin shuvo, Jannatul Ferdous Oishee and Taskeen Rahman's performance were the best while also claiming the VFX in the movie to be really poor. On the review of Bangla Movie database, they said Mission Extreme is a must watch film.

=== Awards ===
Award list
Date of ceremony	Award	Category	Recipient(s)	Result
May 27, 2022	Meril-Prothom Alo Awards	Best New Face	Jannatul Ferdous Oishee	Won
February 18, 2023	CJFB Performance Award	Best Movie	Mission Extreme	Won
February 18, 2023	CJFB Performance Award	Best Actor	Arefin Shuvo	Won

== Sequel ==
The sequel Black War: Mission Extreme 2 takes place after the end of Mission Extreme. Where ADC Nahid and his force is hunting down the terror leader to not disrupt national stability and stop the series of attacks occur. Mission Extreme: Black War is released in 44 theaters across the country on January 13, 2023.
