= Dipankar Dipon =

Bangladeshi film director and screenwriter

Dipankar Sengupta Dipon
- দীপঙ্কর সেনগুপ্ত দীপন
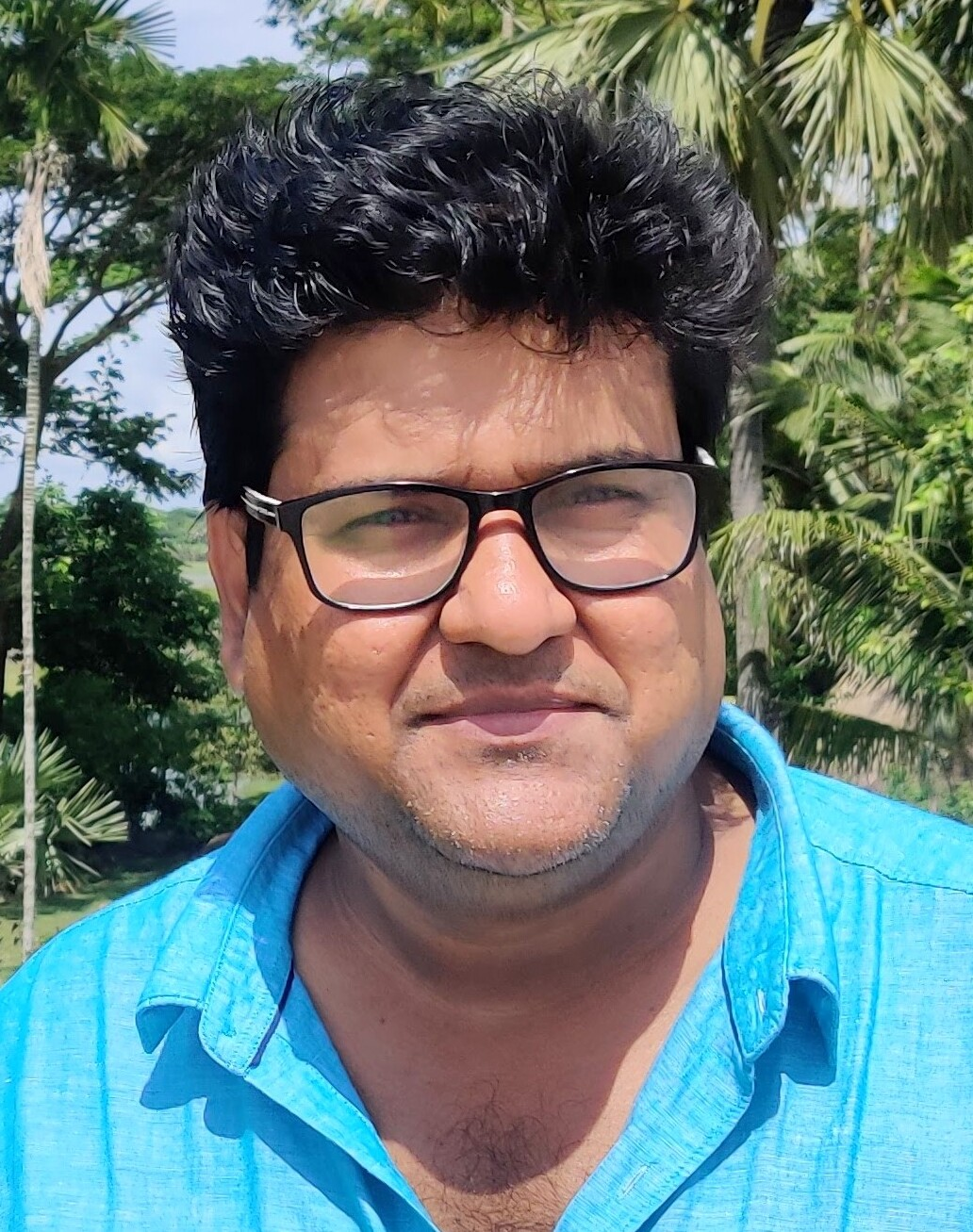
- Born: 22 May 1976 (age 50); Rangpur, Bangladesh
- Education: Jahangirnagar University (MA)
- Occupations: Director; screenwriter
- Years active: 1998–present
- Notable work: Dhaka Attack
- Awards: Full list

Dipankar Sengupta Dipon (born 22 May 1976) is a Bangladeshi film director and screenwriter who works in Dhallywood. His first feature film was the cop thriller Dhaka Attack (2017), which won four National Film Awards in 2017 including Best Film, Best Actor, Best Sound, and Best Make-up. His film Operation Sundarbans received 3 national film awards in 2022 in the Comedy, Best Make-up Man, and Male Singer categories. Since 1998, he has made one feature film, one web content, 30 TV movies and telefilms, 25 TV serials, 40 short TV video fictions, 48 live-action films for sesame street Bangladesh, 2 short films, and 12 documentaries.

== Early life ==
Dipon as Dipankar Sen Gupta was born in 1976 in Rangpur, Bangladesh. His father is Sunil Sen Gupta, and his mother is Ranjeeta Sen Gupta. He started off his television career with Shwapnoghuri in 2002, while he was studying at the Dramatics Department of Jahangirnagar University. After making tele-fictions for nearly ten years, Dipon worked with renowned Indian filmmaker Anurag Kashyap in Mumbai for two years, starting in 2012.

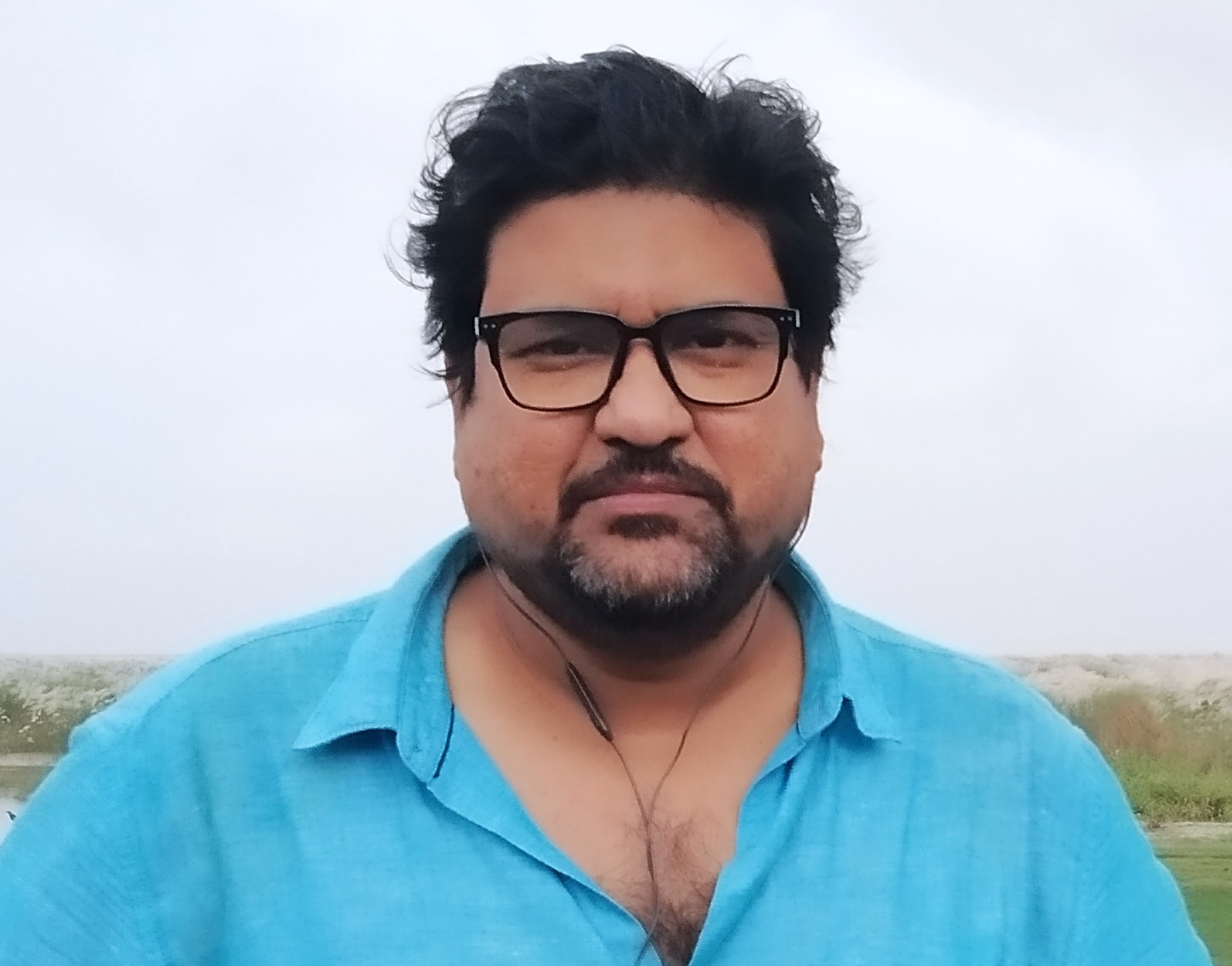
Dipankar Dipon at Rajshahi for Film Research

== Education ==
- HSC & SSC Carmichael College, Rangpur; Government Science College, Dhaka; Setabganj Pilot High School, Setabganj, Dinajpur
- B.A. in drama and dramatics from Jahangirnagar University, Dhaka, Bangladesh (2000)
- M.A. in drama and dramatics from Jahangirnagar University, Dhaka, Bangladesh (2002)

== Career ==
"and I ended up with a three-point formula. The first was: after entering the cinema, I wanted the audience to forget what problems he has at home. This is what people want when they go to a cinema: to be immersed in another world. So I had to make the audience believe that this world exists; these characters exist. The second was: the story has to be unpredictable. We naturally want to assume what will happen next. If I could do that, I would get the audience's respect, and keep them hooked to the film. The third was I wanted to create some experiences that can only be enjoyed on the big screen, and not on a phone or computer display."

— Dipon views on the target audience for the film.

Dipon started his career in 1998. His first feature film, Dhaka Attack (the first police action thriller movie in Bangladesh), released in 2017 and broke the record of 21 years of business of non-festival movies in Bangladesh. He worked with AKFPL (Anurag Kashyap Film Production Limited) in Mumbai from 2012 to 2014. He was a senior scriptwriter at Phantom Films in Mumbai from 2012 to 2014. He was the live-action director at Sesame Workshop under Asiatic since 2008–2012. As a creative director, he made many different kinds of socio-economic and factual documentaries for many leading organizations, i.e. UNICEF, UNFPA, UNHCR, PLAN, Marie Stopes – Bangladesh, etc.

=== Writer and director ===
Dipon was the director of a child drama named Gupi Gyen Bagha Byen in Sonali Nattya Ghosthi, Setabganj, Dinajpur, which has been staged at the International Theater Festival in Katak, Orissa, India, in November 2003. He was the writer and director of a short stage drama named Nichak Galpa Noi in Rangpur Padatik in December 2002, which has been staged in Rangpur. He directed a child drama named Prajanma Agami in Sonali Nattya Ghosthi, Setabganj, Dinajpur which has been staged in the National child drama festival in the Public Library, Dhaka in June 2002. He was the writer and director of a child drama based on child rights named Ora Hotel Sramik in Sonali Nattya Ghosthi, Setabganj, Dinajpur in May 2000, which has been staged 6 times in Setabganj and Dinajpur. He was an actor of many dramas such as Banapangshul, Oedipus, Korotir Kathakata, Sakuntala, Biday Avishap, Shesher Kabita, A Doll's House, Mrichakatikam, Sri Krisna Kirtan, Kando Nadi Kando in Jahangirnagar University Inter Hall Drama Festival & Academic Production of Dept. of Drama & Dramatics, Jahangirnagar University.

== Filmography ==
=== Film ===
| Denotes films that have not yet been released |

| Year | Title | Crewdudheuushs | Credit | Studios | Notes | Ref. |
|---|---|---|---|---|---|---|
| 2017 | Dhaka Attack | Arifin Shuvoo, Mahiya Mahi, Taskeen Rahman, ABM Sumon | Director; Writer; Producer | Three Wheelers Ltd, Splash Multimedia Ltd | National Film Award for Best Film | |
| 2020 | Nabab LLB | Shakib Khan, Mahiya Mahi, Orchita Sporshia | Screenplay editor | Celebrity Productions | iTheatre originals | |
| 2022 | Operation Sundarbans | Siam Ahmed, Nusraat Faria, Roshan, Darshana Banik, Riaz, Taskeen Rahman | Director; Writer | RAB Welfare Cooperative Society | This film got 3 national film awards in 2022 in Comedy, Male Singer category and Khokon Mollah in the Best Make-up Man category. | |
| 2023 | Antarjal | Siam Ahmed, Sunerah Binte Kamal, Bidya Sinha Saha Mim, ABM Sumon | Director; Writer; Producer | Spellbound | | |
| TBA | Chatri Shango | TBA | Director | | | |
| TBA | Dhaka 2040 | Bappy Chowdhury, Nusrat Faria, Nusrat Imrose Tisha, ABM Sumon | Director; Writer | Studio 8 Entertainment | | |
| TBA | Do or Die | TBA | Director Writer | | | |

=== Web ===
| Year | Movie | Actor | Production house/OTT |
|---|---|---|---|
| 2019 | Lilith | Siam Ahmed; Masuma Rahman Nabila Dominic Gomez | Hoichoi |
| 2020 | Chaya ( The Shadow | Pavel Azad, Ashish Khandakar | G SERIES |

=== Television ===
| YEAR | TITLE | CATEGORY | JOB |
|---|---|---|---|
| 2003 | Charshaw paitrish taka pochattor paisa ( 435.75 TK) | TV movie, 82 Min, NTV | Director, writer |
| 2004 | Rupanti Kingba onupar Golpo ( Tale of Rapanti or Anupa) | TV movie, 86 Min, NTV | Director |
| 2005 | Lal Shari ( Red Saree) | TV movie, 72 Min, Channel I | Director |
| 2006 | Osman Gani Chade jabe ( Osman Gani will to the Moon) | TV movie, 72 Min, Channel I | Director, writer |
| 2006 | Rudro O Rodela kabbya ( Story of Rudro & Rodela) | TV movie, 82 Min, Rtv | Director |
| 2007 | Josnadhara ( Moon Light) | TV movie, 74 Min, Rtv | Director |
| 2008 | Rupar Mudra ( Silver Coin) | TV movie, 78 Min, Rtv | Director |
| 2008 | Chor o Novelist ( A thief & a novelist) | TV movie, 56 Min, Bangla Vision | Director |
| 2010 | Chobioala (The photographer) | TV movie, 81 min, NTV | Director, writer |
| 2011 | Sanko ( The Bridge) | TV movie, 72 Min, Machranga TV | Director |
| 2011 | Valobashi protidin (Love you everyday), | TV movie, 75 Min, NTV | Director, writer |
| 2011 | Amiter premguli ki asholei prem chilo? ( Was Amit's all love really true?), | TV movie, 82 Min, Desh TV | Director, writer |
| 2013 | She rate purnima chilo na ( There was no moon in that night) | TV movie, 65 min, GTV. | Director |
| 2013 | Ar kichu nei baki ( Nothing is left) | TV movie, 82 min, SATV, | Director |
| 2014 | Protidin Shonibar ( Everyday is Saturday) | TV movie, Channel 9, 72 min | Director |
| 2015 | Shoroker name nam ( Naming of a Road), | TV movie, Channel 9, 75 min | Director, writer |
| 2017 | Reverse Swing | TV movie, Bangla TV, 72 min | Director |

TV Series

| YEAR | TITLE | CATEGORY | JOB |
|---|---|---|---|
| 2003 | Sadarater Manush ( White Nights) | TV series, NTV | Director |
| 2004 | Bohemian | TV series, ATB Bangla | Director |
| 2006 | Ghar Phera ( Going Home) | TV series, Channel 1 | Director, writer |
| 2006 | Bishkhkhoy ( Anit drug vaccine) | TV series, NTV | Director |
| 2007 | Lukochuri ( Hide & Seek) | TV series, Rtv | Director, writer |
| 2007 | Moneybag Fantasy | TV series, Channel I | Director, writer |
| 2008 | Swapnojal ( Web of Dreams) | TV series, NTV | Director |
| 2007 | Baksho ( The Box) | TV series, ATN Bangla | Director |
| 2009 | Metamorphosis | TV series, Desh TV | Director |
| 2009 | Mayer Doa Poribohon ( Mother's Blessing : Name o a Local Buss) | TV series, Desh TV | Director |
| 2009 | Nine months in Brick lane | TV series, Channel I | Director |
| 2010 | College Road | TV series, Rtv | Director |
| 2011 | All Rounder | TV series, Bangla Vision | Director |
| 2011 | Dorshoker Golpo ( Stories from viewers) | TV series, NTV | Director |
| 2012 | Interrogation | (A five episode TV serial), Channel 24 | Director |
| 2013 | Muktijidhdho school ( Liberation War School) | TV series, Gazi TV | Director |
| 2014 | Loveguru dot com | TV series, Channel 9 | Director |
| 2015 | Grand Master | TV series, Channel 9 | Director |
| 2016 | Tokkor ( Confrontation) | TV series, Bangla TV | Director |

TV Short Film

| YEAR | TITLE | CATEGORY | JOB |
|---|---|---|---|
| 2002 | Swapnaghuri ( Dream Kite) | TV Short Film, 44 Min, BTV | Director |
| 2003 | Kichu Kichu alo Andhokar | TV Short Film, 50 Min, NTV | Director |
| 2004 | Katharsis | TV Short Film, 48 Min, NTV | Director |
| 2006 | Daoai | TV Short Film, 46 Min, NTV | Director |
| 2006 | Kacher meye | TV Short Film, 56 Min, NTV | Director |
| 2007 | Talking Car | TV Short Film, 52 Min, NTV | Director, writer |
| 2007 | Tempo | TV Short Film, 42 Min, Channel 1 | Director |
| 2007 | Tin Taka Minute | TV Short Film, 40 Min, ATN Bangla | Director, writer |
| 2008 | DVD | TV Short Film, 48 Min, NTV | Director |
| 2008 | Kothai Pabo tare | TV Short Film, 44 Min, Banglavision | Director |
| 2008 | Ekoda ek bagher Golai Har phutiachilo | TV Short Film, 42 Min, Channel 1 | Director |
| 2008 | Cheytra Shesher valobasah | TV Short Film, 40 Min, Channel I | Director |
| 2009 | The Golden Ratio | TV Short Film, 45 Min, NTV | Director, writer |
| 2009 | Rendezvous | TV Short Film, 44 Min, ATN Bangla | Director |
| 2010 | Mokam Tola | TV Short Film, 44 Min, Channel I | Director, writer |
| 2012 | Ferarai Ek din ( Escaping :One day) | TV Short Film, 54 Min, Channel 9 | Director |
| 2012 | Phone call | TV Short Film, 54 Min, Channel 24 | Director |
| 2012 | Terracotar Manush ( Face of Terracotta) | TV Short Film, 47 Min, ATB Bangla | Director |
| 2012 | Matir Nandan Ful ( Aesthetics of soil) | TV Short Film, 54 Min, Desh TV | Director, writer |
| 2012 | Prem Ekti Rashayonik Bikkria ( Love is chemical reaction) | TV Short Film, 45 Min, Channel 24 | Director |
| 2013 | Never mind | TV Short Film, 41 Min, Channel 9 | Director |
| 2013 | Tamannar jonno ( Only for Tamanna) | TV Short Film, 42 Min, Baishakhi TV | Director |
| 2013 | The lost Phone | TV Short Film, 44 Min, Channel I | Director |
| 2013 | Kobir jonno patri khoja hochche ( Searching a groom for a poet) | TV Short Film, 45 Min, NTV | Director |

Short Film

| YEAR | TITLE |
|---|---|
| 2008 | Vetorer Manush |
| 2020 | Chaya ( The Shadow) |

Docudrama

| YEAR | CONTENT NAME | CATEGORY | ORGANIZATION |
|---|---|---|---|
| 2004 | Amrao pari | Short Video Fiction | PLAN Bangladesh |
| 2004 | Amader Bandhu | Short Video Fiction | PLAN Bangladesh |

Documentaries

| TITLE | DURATION | PROJECT AREA | CLIENT | AGENCY |
|---|---|---|---|---|
| A Documentary on 'WISH 2 Action' (2020) | 23 Min | Dhaka, Mymensingh, Khaliajuri, B'Baria | Marie Stopes Bangladesh | Three Wheelers ltd |
| A documentary on 'Urban Health-Strengthening care for poor Mothers and New-Born of Bangladesh' project (2018) | 17 Min | Dhaka, keraniganj, Gazipur, Narshindi | Marie Stopes Bangladesh | Three Wheelers ltd |
| Let's be prepared!, Docu-drama on disaster preparedness under a project of European commission and Islamic relief Bangladesh. ( 2010) | 18 Min | Brahmanbaria, Rangpur | European commission in Association with Islamic Relief | Three Wheelers ltd |
| Towards a new life, Documentary on Roihingya refugees in Teknaf under a project of European commission and Islamic relief Bangladesh. ( 2010) | 12 Min | Teknaf | UNHCR in Association | BITOPI |
| Documentary on Risk Reduction (2006) | 15 Min | Tahirpur, Sunamganj, Tangail | UNFPA | BITOPI |
| Eid of street children (2005) | 20 Min | Dhaka | Plan Bangladesh | UNL |
| Documentary on Child Forum & Child election ( 2006) | 10 Min | Tangail | Save the children | Three Wheelers Ltd |
| Documentary on Child Forum & Child election (2005) | 12 Min | Tangail | Save the children | Three Wheelers Ltd |
| Documentary making workshop for Rural Child of Tangail (2005) | - | Tangail | Save the children | Three Wheelers Ltd |
| Documentary & Drama on Tree Plantation & Sanitation (2004) | 4 Episode, 22 Min Each | Rangpur & Gazipur | PLAN Bangladesh | UNL |

== Awards and honors ==
In 2007, Dipon participated Talent campus with his short film in International Film Festival, Berlin, Germany, and also he had an exclusive project in the Berlinale Talent Project market as an only Bangladeshi Film Maker. For his film "Dhaka Attack" he won the award for best film for National Film Awards 2017 by Information Ministry of Bangladesh.

- December 2018: ATN Best film director for Movie Dhaka Attack.
- February 2013: RTV-Diamond world star award for Best Director (TV serial category) for TV serial COLLEGE ROAD.
- April 2009: Charuniram TV drama award for Best Drama for the TV Drama GOLDEN RATIO
- May 2008: Peoples theatre association award for Best Director of the year for the stage Drama (Gupi gyen Bagha Byen)

=== Berlinale film project ===
Dipankar Dipon participated in the Berlinale Talent Campus in 2006 with his short film Children on a Rainy Day. That same year, his project Janani was selected for the Talent Project Market, a section of the Berlinale Co-Production Market, where it was one of 17 projects chosen from 227 entries. Janani was a futuristic film addressing overpopulation in Dhaka.

=== National Film Awards of Bangladesh ===
Bengali Cinema Dhaka Attack directed by Dipankar Dipon won four national awards in 2017 including Best Film, Best Actor, Best Makeup, and Best Sound. His film Operation Sundarbans got 3 national film awards in 2022 in Comedy, Khokon Mollah in the Best Make-up Man category, and Male Singer category.
