= Taskeen Rahman =

Bangladeshi actor

- তাসকিন রহমান
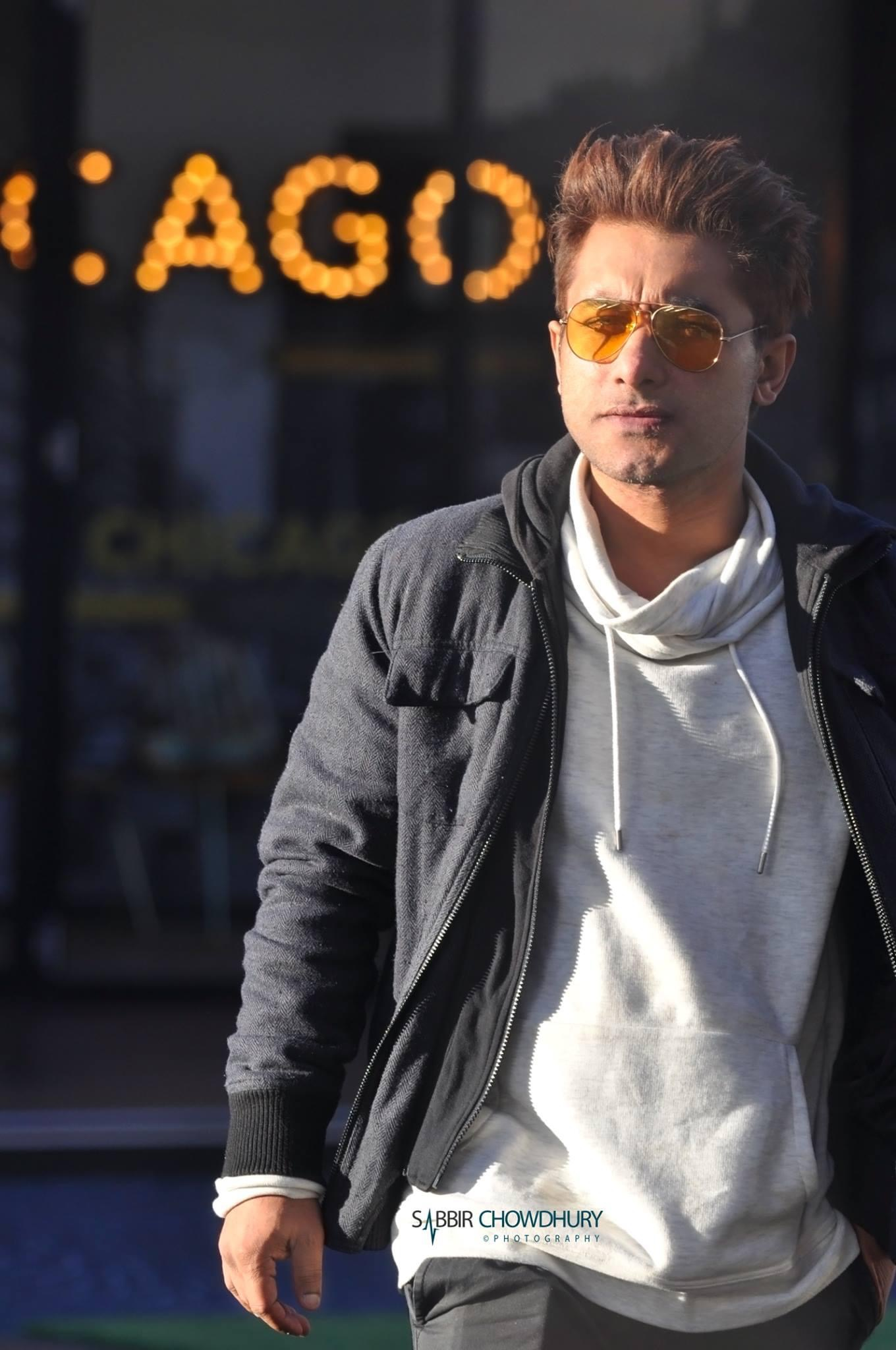
- Born: 20 August 1982; Dhaka, Bangladesh
- Occupations: Actor, model
- Years active: 1993-2002 2015–present
- Notable work: Dhaka Attack
- Spouses: Kazi Anjuly (m. 2019)
- Relatives: 3 siblings including Taneem Rahman Angshu (brother)
- Awards: Meril Prothom Alo Award for Best Newcomer (Film and Television)

Taskeen Rahman is a Bangladeshi actor. He made his debut in the 2017 released film Dhaka Attack in which he played the role of an antagonist. Rahman was appreciated by critics for his performance in the film.

== Career ==
Taskeen Rahman lived in Australia from 2002 to 2017. In December 2017, he planned to return to Bangladesh to work in the film industry. He has a bachelor's degree in forensic science and a master's degree in business management. His research for his PhD assessment is ongoing.

Rahman later appeared in Mission Extreme, directed by Sunny Sanwar and Faisal Ahmed.

== Filmography ==
Year	Film	Role	Director	Notice
2017	Dhaka Attack	Zishan	Dipankar Dipon	
2018	Sultan: The Saviour	Lama	Raja Chanda	
2019	Jodi Ekdin	Jamie	Mohammad Mostafa Kamal Raz	
2019	Boyfriend	Rony	Uttam Akash	
2021	Mission Extreme	Khalid	Sunny Sanwar & Faisal Ahmed	
2021	Janowar	Lead Police Officer	Raihan Rafi	
2022	Shaan	Matin / David	M A Rahim	
2022	Operation Sundarbans	Rakib	Dipankar Sengupta Dipon	
2023	Black War: Mission Extreme 2	Khalid	Sunny Sanwar & Faisal Ahmed	
2023	Casino†	Juboraj	Saikat Nasir	
2023	Mrittupuri: Kill Zone†	TBA	Zayed Rizwan	
2023	Aadi†	Zamshed	Taneem Rahman Angshu	
2023	Operation Agneepath†	TBA	Ashiqur Rahman	
