= Musafir (2016 film) =

Musafir: Tale of Assassins
- Theatrical Release Poster
- Directed by: Ashiqur Rahman
- Screenplay by: Ashiqur Rahman
- Produced by: Jobaer Alam
- Starring: Arifin Shuvoo; Marjaan Jenifa; Misha Sawdagor; Tiger Robi; Shimul Khan
- Cinematography: Ashiqur Rahman
- Edited by: Ashiquzzaman Apu
- Music by: Naved; Imran Mahmudul; Belal Khan
- Production companies: Perceptual Pictures; Ashiqur Rahman Films
- Distributed by: Tiger Media Limited
- Release date: 22 April 2016
- Country: Bangladesh
- Language: Bengali

Musafir (English: Traveller) is a 2016 Bangladeshi action spy thriller film written and directed by Ashiqur Rahman. The film stars Arifin Shuvoo, Marjan Jenifa, Misha Sawdagor, Tiger Robi, Elias Kobra, Shohel Mondol, Rebeka Rouf, Anondo Khaled, Afzal Sharif, Shimul Khan, Jadu Azad and Cindy Rolling. Shuvoo plays an intelligence double agent, and a trained assassin of Secret Service Bangladesh (SSB) who is placed as a mole in the target organization. The plot builds up around SSB's rescue operation of Zara, who has possession of many classified information wanted by Bangladesh's external enemies. Jenifa plays the role of Zara Mehjabin, a surveillance agent of SSB, suddenly disappeared with many classified documents of the agency. The plot takes an interesting turn when the target agency sends Shuvo to abduct Zara, not knowing that he is actually a SSB agent in disguise.

The film was produced by Jobaer Alam under the banner of Perceptual Pictures and distributed by Tiger Media Limited. Musafir is the second collaboration between Ashiqur Rahman and Arifin Shuvoo after initial success of 2014 action film Kistimaat. The film was released on 22 April 2016 and received overwhelming response at the box office and from audiences.

== Plot summary ==
The story revolves around a secret agent from the Secret Service Bangladesh SSB, Marjaan who went missing with classified information that can put national security at risk. Sunny (Arifin Shuvoo), is a contract killer whose mission is to find Zara Mehjabin (Marjan Jenifa). The powerful underworld mafia are also looking to get their hands on the classified information.

== Cast ==
- Arifin Shuvoo, as Sunny
- Marjan Jenifa, as Zara Mehjabin
- Misha Sawdagor as Asad-ud-daula, Director of Secret Service Bangladesh
- Tiger Robi as Tobrez, Mafia Leader
- Afzal Sharif as the doctor
- Anondo Khaled as the doctor
- Ilias Kobra as Gulzar
- Shohel Mondol as Raz, Tobrez's Brother
- Shimul Khan as Shehzad
- Rebeka Rouf as Maria's Mother
- Jadu Azad as a contract killer
- Cindy Rolling as Poroma Sundori, a psychopathic killer
- Harun Rashid as Bunty
- Rifat Jahan
- Debashish Biswas as Rajan Chowdhury in a special appearance
- Mahmudul Islam Mithu as Mahtab in a special appearance
- Prosun Azad as Maria in a special appearance Sunny's ex-girlfriend

== Production ==
=== Development ===
After the success of Kistimaat, Ashiqur Rahman announced his next project in January 2015. After much discussion, Arifin Shuvoo was selected for the lead role. Since then, Misha Sawdagor and Tiger Robi were approached to play the antagonists in the film. Director Ashiqur Rahman later announced that he would introduce a new female lead in the film and Marjan Jenifa was selected for the role. It was later reported that Prosun Azad would also play a supporting role. According to the producers, the film's action sequences were to be shot and directed with international experts. Edward Mithu was hired from Singapore as the fight director.

=== Shooting ===
The film's principal photography began in February 2015 and official shooting began on 20 March 2015. The first few scenes were shot at Hatirjheel, Dhaka and several other scenes were shot in other locations of the city. The film was also shot in Chittagong and Sylhet.

=== Promotion ===
The film's promotional first look was released on 9 May 2015 and the first teaser trailer was released on 15 May 2015.

== Music ==
=== Soundtrack album ===
Musafir (Original Motion Picture Soundtrack)

Soundtrack album by Tahsan, Imran Mahmudul, Sabrina Porshi, Belal Khan, Tahsin, Naved
- Released: 14 February 2016
- Recorded: 2015
- Genre: Feature film soundtrack
- Label: Tiger Media Limited
- Director: Imran Mahmudul

Dilshad Nahar Kona

No.	Title	Artist	Length
1.	"Alto Choyate"	Imran Mahmudul	4:08
2.	"Firey Aay"	Tahsin Ahmed, Sabrina Porshi	5:13
3.	"Musafir"	Tawfique Ahmed, Fahad Bin Aziz	3:16
4.	"Poth Jana Nei"	Tahsan Rahman Khan	3:38
5.	"Musafir (Remix)"	Tanzil Hasan, Naved	3:27
6.	"Rong"	Belal Khan, Kona	3:56
