= Jannatul Ferdous Oishee =

Bangladeshi model, actress, and beauty pageant contestant

- জান্নাতুল ফেরদৌস ঐশী
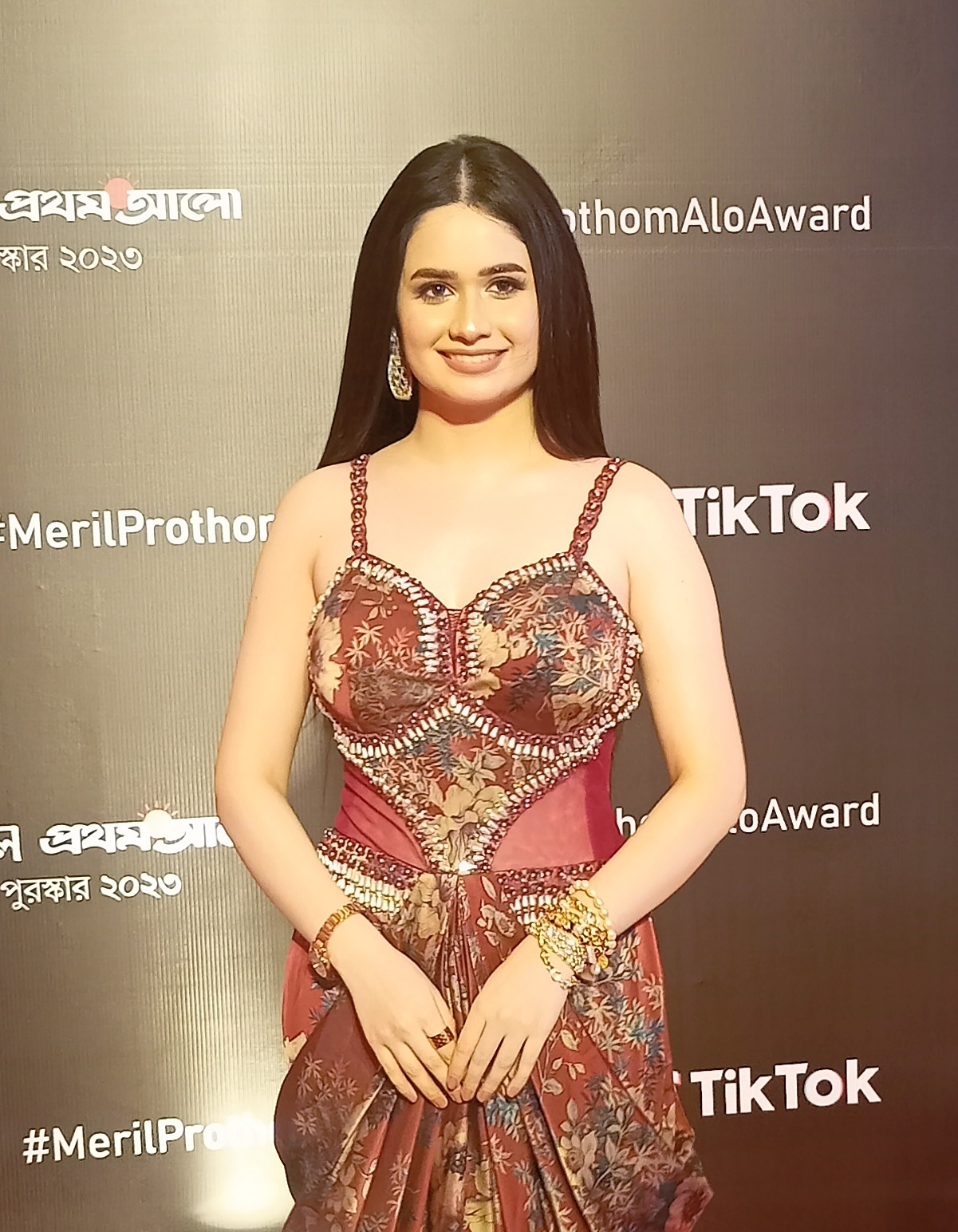
- Oishee in 2024
- Born: 1999 or 2000 (age 26–27)
- Education: Independent University, Bangladesh
- Occupations: Model; actor

Jannatul Ferdous Oishee (born 27 August 2000) is a Bangladeshi actress, model and beauty queen. She was crowned Miss World Bangladesh 2018. She represented Bangladesh at the Miss World 2018 in Sanya, China on 8 December 2018, and was placed in the top 30 among 118 contestants.

== Education ==
Oishee completed her higher secondary education by 2018. She is the youngest among her siblings. Her father is a development worker and mother is a teacher.

Oishee was a student at Independent University, Bangladesh.

== Career ==
=== Pageantry ===
Oishee was crowned Miss World Bangladesh 2018 at the International Convention City Bashundhara (ICCB) in Dhaka. She won the title by defeating 30,000 contestants which gained her entry to the Miss World 2018 pageant.

Oishee was crowned Miss Grand Bangladesh 2025 . She will represent Bangladesh at Miss Grand International 2025 in Bangkok, Thailand, on 18 October 2025

In Miss World 2018 held in Sanya, China, Oishee was voted as the winner among six contestants of group 6 head-to-head challenge by public vote. The other contestants in her group were from China, British Virgin Islands, Denmark, Brazil and Ireland. In the final round of the challenge, she was chosen by all three judges, Stephanie Del Valle, Manushi Chhillar, and Megan Young, to win over Miss Nigeria, which placed Oishee in top 30 among 118 contestants of Miss World 2018.

=== Acting ===
Oishee debuted her acting career in the film Mission Extreme with her role Sylvi in 2021. She reprised the role in the sequel Black War: Mission Extreme 2 (2023). She later acted in Adam (2023) as Sajia.

== Filmography ==
Key
†	Denotes films that have not yet been released

Year	Title	Role	Notes	Ref.
2021	Mission Extreme	Silvy	Debut film; Won – Meril-Prothom Alo Award for Best Debutant Actress	
2021	Raat Jaga Phool	Faria		
2023	Black War: Mission Extreme 2	Silvy		
2023	Adam	Sajia		
2025	Noor	Sheuli	Released on Bioscope+	
2026	Soldier †	TBA	Post-production	
