= MR-9: Do or Die =

2023 Bengali film

- Theatrical release poster
- Directed by: Asif Akbar
- Screenplay by: Nazim Ud Daula; Abdul Aziz; Asif Akbar
- Based on: Dhongsho Pahar by Qazi Anwar Hussain
- Produced by: Asif Akbar; Hemdee Kiwanuka; Colin Bates; Philip Tan; Abdul Aziz
- Starring: ABM Sumon; Sakshi Pradhan; Tariq Anam Khan; Jessia Islam; Frank Grillo; Michael Jai White; Omi Vaidya
- Music by: Ricky Kej
- Production companies: Premiere Entertainment; Jaaz Multimedia; Avail Entertainment; Al Bravo Films; Chasing Butterflies Pictures
- Distributed by: Jaaz Multimedia (Bangladesh); Premiere Entertainment Group (North America)
- Release dates: 25 August 2023 (United States); 1 September 2023 (Bangladesh)
- Running time: 107 minutes
- Countries: Bangladesh; United States
- Languages: Bengali; English
- Budget: ৳83 crore (US$6.8 million)

MR-9 (Masud Rana): Do or Die is a 2023 spy action thriller film directed by Asif Akbar. An international co-production between the United States and Bangladesh, it is based on the 1966 Qazi Anwar Hussain novel Dhongsho Pahar. The film was under the banner of Jaaz Multimedia and Avail Entertainment. ABM Sumon played the lead role of Masud Rana.

== Premise ==
Masud Rana or MR 9 is the best spy of Bangladesh Counter Intelligence (BCI). The film revolves around the espionage action of Masud Rana.

== Cast ==
- ABM Sumon as Masud Rana
- Jessia Islam as agent Rupa
- Sakshi Pradhan as Devi
- Michael Jai White as Duke
- Matt Passmore as Ricci Ross
- Frank Grillo as Roman Ross
- Omi Vaidya as Faisal
- Jackie Siegel as gala host
- Anisur Rahman Milon as Dr. Karim/Kabir Chowdhury
- Shahidul Alam Sachchu as Major Rahat Khan
- Vladimir Kozlov as Yakub
- The Great Khali
- Alisha Islam
- Niko Foster
- Remy Grillo

== Production ==
The character of Masud Rana is very iconic to the people of Bangladesh, even I have been familiar with the character of Masud Rana since childhood, you can say, I grew up imagining this character. I've always wanted to present this character to the world.

— Asif Akbar to Banglanews24.com

Jaaz Multimedia bought the copyright of the book from Qazi Anwar Hussain, the author of the novel, for the purpose of making the film based on the Dhongsho Pahar. A reality show titled "Who will be Masud Rana" was organized on Channel i to select the main character of the film. However, later there was uncertainty as to whether the actor would be selected from this reality show. Auditions are also arranged to select the main characters. Later, Qazi Anwar Hussain was shown photos of several actors to choose who will play the main character in the film. He saw those photos and finalized the name of ABM Sumon. In November 2021, actress Bidya Sinha Mim was signed for the role of Sulta Rao, where she was supposed to play an Indian spy. Later, she dropped the film due to schedule complications. However, Jaaz Multimedia offered Mim another role of the film Sohana. But she also rejected it as a supporting character. In 2021, Sayeda Tithee Omni was hired to play the character 'Nabanita'. This is the debut film of Remy Grillo who is son of Frank Grillo. The film was shot in Las Vegas, Los Angeles and Dhaka. This is a US–Bangladesh joint production film. Its producers are Al Bravo, Hemdee Kiwanuka, Colin Bates, Asif Akbar, Philip Tan and Abdul Aziz. Niko Foster, Peter Nguyen and Phillip B. Goldfine are executive producers of the film. Its screenplay was adapted from Dhonghsho Pahar novel from the Masud Rana series. Its screenplay was written by Asif Akbar, Abdul Aziz and Nazim Ud Daula. The filming was scheduled for April 2021, but was not possible due to the COVID-19 pandemic. The date was later postponed to August, but the plan was thwarted by visa problems for the U.S. crew. Then February 2022 was fixed as the new date. But its filming was also postponed on that date. Since any country making a film in joint production with Bangladesh has to show its script to the preview committee, so in a meeting held on 7 June 2022, its script was presented to the committee. There the committee suggested several changes. The shooting of the Bangladesh part of the film started in the last week of June and ended on 30 June 2022. Ricky Kej was signed on to compose the film's music after the post-production started.

== Release ==
The film was released in both Bengali and English. Besides being released in Bangladesh, it was also released in Tollywood. In July 2022, Asif Akbar announced that the film would be released next year. After 2023 Cannes Film Festival, Premiere Entertainment became its worldwide distributor. It was scheduled to be released on 29 June 2023 but did not release. The film (English version) was released on 25 August 2023 in 16 theatres of Bangladesh and 151 theatres of North America and the film (Bangla version) was released on 1 September 2023 in Bangladesh.

== See also ==
- Masud Rana (1974 film)
