= Casino (2023 film) =

Bangladeshi film directed by Shaikat Nasir

- First look
- Bengali: ক্যাসিনো
- Directed by: Saikat Nasir
- Written by: Abdullah Jahir Babu; Asad Jaman
- Starring: Nirab; Shabnom Bubly; Taskeen Rahman; Sadiya Rubayet Tanjin
- Cinematography: Forhad Hossain; Akib Rayhan (still photography)
- Production company: Simplex International
- Distributed by: Simplex International
- Release date: 29 June 2023
- Country: Bangladesh
- Language: Bengali
- Budget: est. ৳1.5 crore (US$120,000)
- Box office: est. ৳15 lakh (US$12,000)

Casino (Bengali: ক্যাসিনো, romanized: Kyāsinō) is a Bangladeshi crime thriller action film directed by Saikat Nasir, produced by Rajib Sarwar, and distributed by Cimplex International Company, the first production for the company. It stars Nirab, Shabnom Bubly, and Taskeen Rahman. Abdullah Zahir Babu and Asad Jaman co-wrote the screenplay. This was Bubly's first movie without starring Shakib Khan. The film was initially scheduled to be released in the summer of 2020, but the release was postponed to June 2023 due to the COVID-19 pandemic.

== Cast ==
The cast includes both well and lesser known actors.

- Nirab - ACP Nawaz, A police detective. The lead protagonist.
- Shabnom Bubly - Ariana, casino girl
- Taskeen Rahman - Juboraj, a casino kingpin. The key antagonist.
- Sadia Rubayet Tanjin - A police assistant.
- Dilruba Hossain Doyel -
- Munim Ehsan - Nepali casino slot attendant.
- Lutfur Rahman Khan Simanto

== Production ==
=== Development ===
Saikat Nasir began developing this project in June 2019. He discussed about his plans for making 'Casino' as well as various characters for the screenplay with Nirab. Abullah Jahir Babu wrote the screenplay with Asad. Bir was set to start filming from November 2019, but filming was postponed. Saikat then approached Bubly to join the Casino cast. Bubly joined the cast after SK films let her utilize the current schedule for shooting another film. On 10 November 2019, Bubly and Taskeen confirmed their signing to Casino.

=== Filming and set design ===
It took one month and seventy people to replicate a casino, bar, and Interpol office inside the Bangladesh Film Development Corporation (BFDC) for shooting. Bali has been selected to host the ‘Casino’ team for the shooting of songs. Nasir filmed in three separate schedules. Filming started on 24 November 2019 the opening scene took place on Neela Market near the 300 feet road's Fire Service station. Saikat Nasir secretly filmed the indoor sequences inside the BFDC's Jasim Floor to avoid leaking any spoilers of this film. Eighty percent of filming was completed by 2019. Other than BFDC, outdoor action sequences have been taken at Banani, bank of the Shitalakshaya river. On the first week of March, 2020 director concluded principal photography.

== Soundtrack ==
The film contains the Dhallywood film songs. Channel I confirms Imran Mahmudul, Konal, Sazzad Hossain, Rubel Khondokar (son of Bangladesh's famous comedian actor Harun Kisinger) and Shahriar Alam Marcell's name for lending their voices for Casino songs.

== Release ==
Casino was initially set to release in mid-2020, but was put on hold due to the COVID-19 pandemic. It was released on 29 June 2023 (Eid-ul-Adha) and opened in 16 movie theaters.
