= Warning (2015 film) =

- Theatrical Teaser Poster
- Directed by: Shafi Uddin Shafi
- Written by: Abdullah Zahir Babu
- Starring: Arifin Shuvoo; Mahiya Mahi; Rubel; Misha Sawdagor
- Music by: Shouquat Ali Imon
- Production company: Maple Films
- Distributed by: Maple Films
- Release date: 1 May 2015
- Running time: 135 minutes
- Country: Bangladesh
- Language: Bengali

Warning (Bengali: ওয়ার্নিং) is a 2015 Bangladeshi action thriller film directed by Shafi Uddin Shafi. The cast includes Arifin Shuvoo, Mahiya Mahi, Rubel and Misha Sawdagor. It is produced under the banner of Maple Films. In the film, Arifin Shuvo plays the role of a part-time journalist cum kidnapper and Mahiya Mahi plays the role a journalist.

== Plot ==
The film starts with a special operation to rescue a few children from human traffickers. DCDB Murad Anti kidnapping Squad is in charge. He helps the rescue team and rescues these children. Meanwhile, a fax comes to the police station and it's informed that someone will kidnap Dr. Masud. Police officers don't emphasize in this fax that someone kidnapped Dr. Masud. Then the kidnapper wants ransom. Then the police team hit upon a plan. They will arrest him when he will come to take the ransom. The kidnapper comes and picks up the money then DCDB Murad chases him. Chasing him they enter Channel X office. There he catches Jishan (Arifin Shuvoo). Jishan enquires about the kidnappers. At the same time, there was a showing on television that Dr. Masud is confessing all his iniquity.

After a few days, a fax comes again and informs that engineer Belal will be kidnapped. To know this police team ensures the security of engineer Belal. But the kidnapper kidnaps engineer Belal. But the police team got the actual image of the kidnapper from CCTV footage and the kidnapper is reporter Jishan. Murad goes to Jishan's house to catch him but he is able to flee from there with the help of Trina. Then Trina asks him why he did that. Jishan tells everything that he lost his father and sister in a building destroyed, his mother got mentally unstable, and he gets news about some person who is connected with this. He will kidnap all of those people to take revenge.

== Cast ==
- Arifin Shuvoo as Jishan
- Mahiya Mahi as Trina
- Rubel as DCDB Murad Hasan, Anti kidnapping Squad incharge
- Misha Sawdagor as Ustagar
- Kazi Hayat as Jishan's father
- Rebeka Rouf as Jishan's mother
- Shiba Shanu as Jahangir
- Abdullah Saki as Dr. Masud
- Abu Sayeed Khan as Engr. Belal
- Shimul Khan as Meraj
- Jadu Azad
- Pirzada Shahidul Harun as Channel Y's owner
- Sohel Rashid as Mr. Sazzad
- Chikon Ali as Mamun
- Sanko Panja
- Bipasha Kabir in Special Appearance

== Production ==
=== Casting ===
Upon success of Agnee, Maple Films Limited announced the production of Warning with a similar ensemble cast, which includes Arifin Shuvoo, Mahiya Mahi and Misha Sawdagor, however the film has no connection with Agnee.

=== Location ===
The film is entirely shot in Bangladesh. Majority of the film was shot in Dhaka while a few scenes were captured in Cox's Bazzar and Sylhet. The music track "Facebook" and "Shono Tumi" was entirely shot in Cox's Bazzar. Approximately 10% of the film was shot in Thailand.

=== Release ===
Warning was scheduled to release on 9 January 2015. However, The release date was pushed forward to 1 May 2015 due to conflict with other events such as Bishwa Ijtema, and 2015 Cricket World Cup.

== Music ==
Warning
- Warning soundtrack cover

Soundtrack album by James, Shafin Ahmed, Nancy, Kona and Munni
- Released: January 6, 2015
- Recorded: 2014
- Genre: Feature film soundtrack
- Length: 31:39
- Label: Tiger Media Limited
- Director: Shouquat Ali Emon
- Producer: S A Khan Topi

Warning's soundtrack album includes six songs, lyrics were written by Kabir Bakul. Shouquat Ali Emon has composed all the tracks for the album. The track "Eto Kosto" was released on 8 December 2014. Track "Facebook" was released on 17 December 2014 and "Shono Tumi", sung by Shafin Ahmed was released on 24 December 2014.

=== Track listing ===
No.	Title	Artist	Length
1.	"Eto Kosto (Kannar Kobita)"	James	6:18
2.	"Shono Tumi"	Shafin Ahmed, Nancy	5:04
3.	"Facebook"	Kona, Rupam	4:52
4.	"Excuse Me"	Dinat Jahan Munni, Tasif	5:04
5.	"Hai Whisky (Break Fail)"	Roma, Saimon	5:18
6.	"Shono Tumi (Solo Version)"	Shafin Ahmed	5:03
