= Antarjal =

2023 Bangladeshi cyber action thriller film by Dipankar Dipon

- Promotional poster
- Directed by: Dipankar Dipon
- Written by: Dipankar Dipon
- Story by: Dipankar Dipon; Saifullah Riyad; Asha Zahid
- Produced by: Mohammad Ali Haidar; Mohammad Sadekul Arefin
- Starring: Siam Ahmed; ABM Sumon; Bidya Sinha Saha Mim; Sunerah Binte Kamal
- Edited by: MD Kalam; Sumit Roy Antor
- Production companies: Motion People Studio; Spellbound Leo Burnett
- Distributed by: Swapno Scarecrow (North America)
- Release date: 22 September 2023
- Running time: 155 minutes
- Country: Bangladesh
- Language: Bengali

Antarjal (Bengali: অন্তর্জাল, transl. Internet) is a 2023 Bangladeshi cyber action thriller film directed and written by Dipankar Dipon. It stars Siam Ahmed, Bidya Sinha Saha Mim, ABM Sumon, and Sunerah Binte Kamal in lead roles. The film, inspired by the ICT Division of the government of Bangladesh, portrays a fictional yet realistic battle in the world of cyber warfare led by three young innovators. Produced by Motion People Studio and Spellbound Leo Burnett, the film was released on 22 September 2023.

== Synopsis ==
The film presents a fictional but intense cyber battle triggered by the innovation of three young minds in Bangladesh. It combines themes of intelligence, cyber security, and national defense.

== Cast ==
- Siam Ahmed as Lumin, a programmer
- Bidya Sinha Saha Mim as Nishat, a cyber security specialist
- ABM Sumon as ASP Raihan, CID's fintech cyber crime officer
- Sunerah Binte Kamal as Priyam, a robotics engineer
- Mashrur Inan
- Amit Sinha
- Mohammad Ali Haidar
- Raonak Hasan

== Production ==
The film was produced by Motion People Studio, and Spellbound Leo Burnett under the patronage of the ICT Division of the government of Bangladesh. The film took over two years to complete.

== Release ==
The film was initially slated for release during Eid-ul-Fitr 2023, but was postponed multiple times due to scheduling conflicts with major international releases such as Shah Rukh Khan's Jawan. It was eventually released on 22 September 2023.

A trailer for the film was released on 3 September 2023.

It was released in a record number of 185 theaters worldwide, including 150 in North America and 35 in Bangladesh.
