= Gangster Returns =

- Theatrical Release Poster
- Directed by: Ashiqur Rahman
- Written by: Ashiqur Rahman
- Produced by: Saiful Azim
- Starring: Ziaul Faruq Apurba; Shampa Hasnain; Jannatul Ferdous Peya; Robiul Islam
- Production company: Intrac Films
- Distributed by: Intrac Films
- Release date: 27 November 2015
- Country: Bangladesh
- Language: Bengali

Gangster Returns is a 2015 Bangladeshi action thriller film directed by Ashiqur Rahman. It features Ziaul Faruq Apurba in the lead role. The development began in January 2013.

== Cast ==
- Ziaul Faruq Apurba as Shaon, a gangster
- Peya Jannatul as Sheena
- Prabir Mitra
- Khaleda Akter Kolpona
- Tiger Robi
- Shampa Hasnain as Titli
- Robiul Islam

== Plot ==
Sheena is a young woman with a sad past. Shawon, played by Apurba, is a man who lives a dark and troubled life. He is part of the criminal world and faces many struggles every day.

One day, Sheena and Shawon meet by chance. They soon become close and start working together in the world of crime. As time passes, Sheena begins to care deeply for Shawon. Even though she knows his life is full of danger and uncertainty, she chooses to stay with him.

The film follows their journey through love, pain, and many dramatic events, leading to an emotional climax as they try to survive in a dangerous world.

== Reception ==
=== Critical response ===
Jennifer de Paris of Bdnews24.com commended for its compelling narrative, strong directorial vision, and authentic performances, while making effective use of visuals and sound to enhance the emotional impact of the story. Wahid Sujon of Bangla Movie Database criticized the film Gangster Returns for its weak plot execution and predictable revenge narrative. While noting that the film offered a relatively comfortable viewing experience compared to lower-quality contemporary releases, Sujon felt it ultimately lost direction in its pursuit of a compelling gangster storyline.
