= Arifin Shuvoo =

Bangladeshi film actor

- আরিফিন শুভ
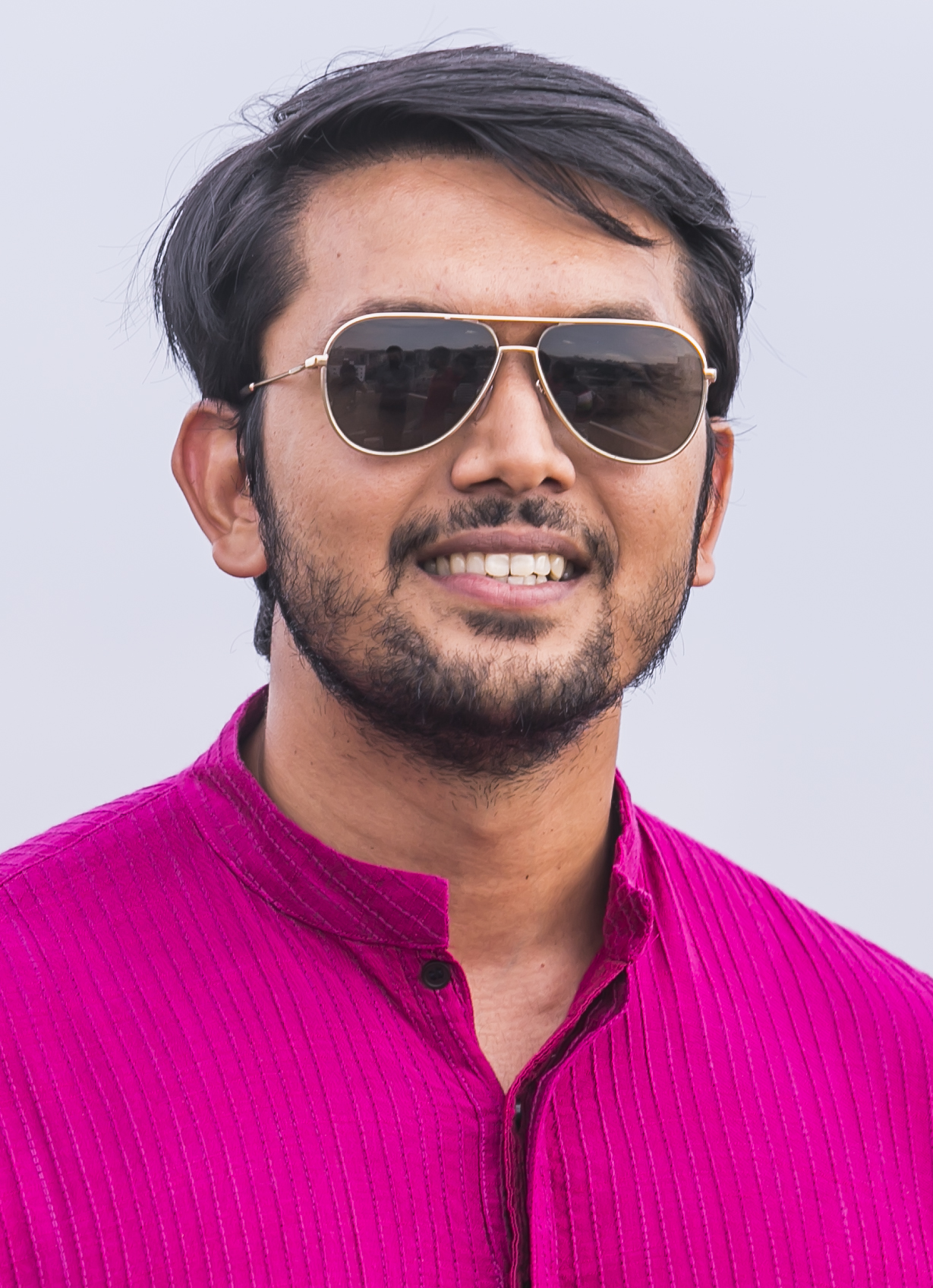
- Shuvoo in 2017
- Born: 2 February 1982 (age 44); Bhaluka, Mymensingh, Bangladesh
- Occupations: Actor; radio personality; television presenter; playback singer; model
- Years active: 2007–present
- Spouse: Arpita Samaddar (m. 2015; div. 2024)
- Awards: Full list

Arifin Shuvoo (born 2 February) is a Bangladeshi film actor and television personality. He is the recipient of several awards and nominations, including a National Film Award and two Meril Prothom Alo Awards. He made his debut television series Ha/Na (2007). He made his debut silver screen film Jaago (2010).

Shuvoo made a debut into mainstream cinema with Purno Doirgho Prem Kahini in 2013. For his antagonist role in the film, he received a nomination for Best Actor at the Meril Prothom Alo Awards. He later went on to star in Bhalobasha Zindabad in 2013 and the romantic action film Agnee in 2014. In 2015, his performance in Chuye Dile Mon earned him his first Meril Prothom Alo Awards for Best Actor. He later starred in the film Musafir directed by Ashiqur Rahman in 2016. In 2017, he starred in Dhaka Attack directed by Dipankar Dipon. In 2021 he starred in Mission Extreme Directed by Sunny Sanwar & Faisal Ahmed.

== Career ==
=== 2007–2009: Television ===
Before working in television shows, Shuvoo worked in television commercials. He made his acting debut in 2007, with appearance in Mostofa Sarwar Farooki's television series Ha/Na in 2007, where he had a recurring role. He also had a recurring role in the show Iz Equal Two in 2008.

He then starred in the television series Serious Ekta Kotha Ache alongside Mosharraf Karim and Sohana Saba. A critically praised performance of his was in the show Lilaboti.

=== 2009–2013: Debut and breakthrough ===
Shuvo made his film debut in the 2010 sports drama film Jaago - Dare To Dream. In Purno Doirgho Prem Kahini he played the antagonist alongside Jaya Ahsan and Shakib Khan. Critic Rafi Hossain, writing for The Daily Star, called his performance in the film "brilliant". He next starred in Debashish Biswas Bhalobasha Zindabad.

=== 2014–present: Critical acclaim ===
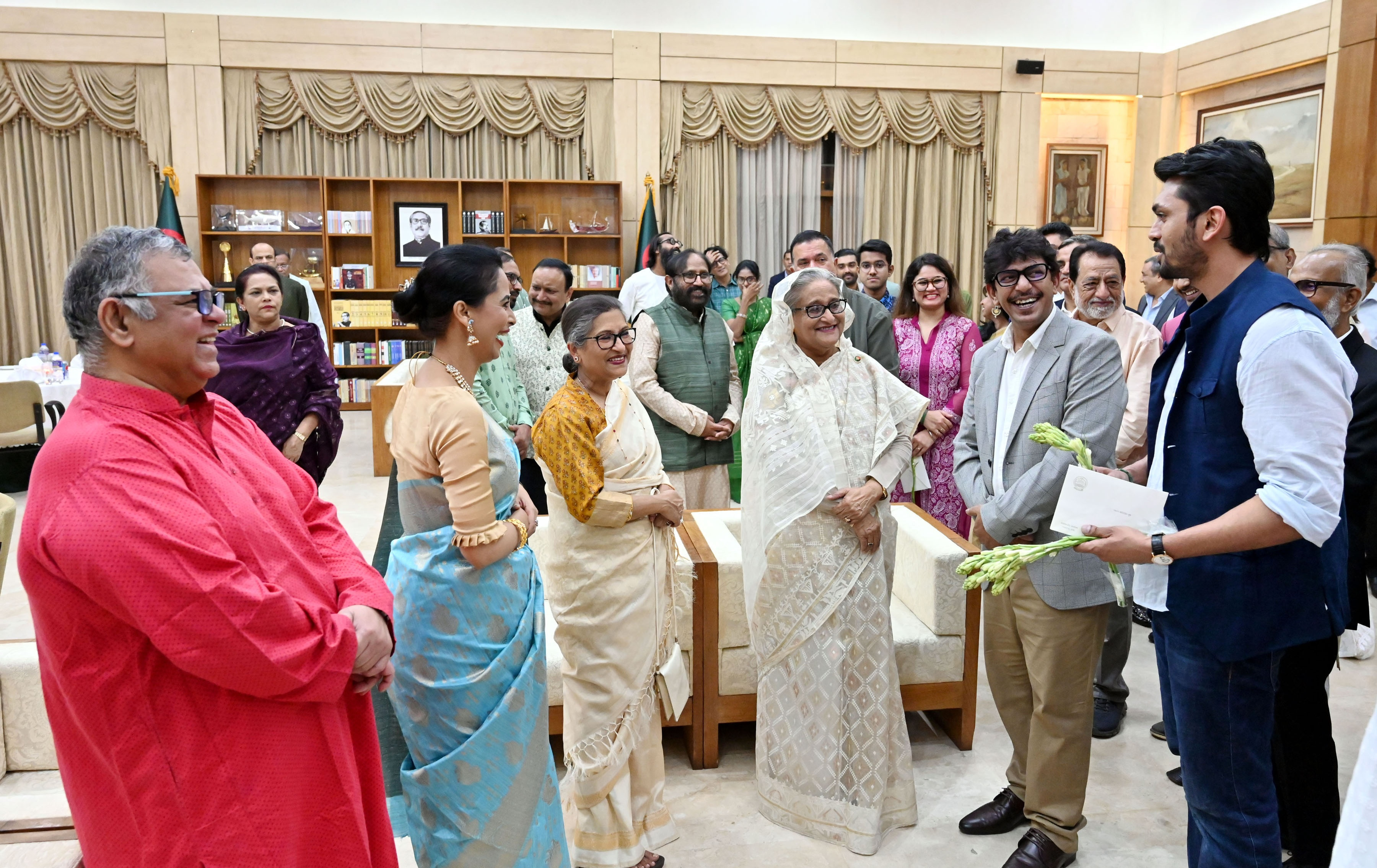
Shuvo along with actor Chanchal Chowdhury meeting with Sheikh Hasina and Sheikh Rehana in 2023.

In 2014, Arifin Shuvoo was first seen in Iftakar Chowdhury's action thriller Agnee, alongside Mahiya Mahi. He next started in Mohammad Mostafa Kamal Raz's Taarkata, which received a mixed reaction from the audience. His next project was Ashiqur Rahman's Kistimaat, co-starring Achol, where he plays the role of a cop.

In 2015, he starred in Shihab Shaheen's romantic drama film Chuye Dile Mon. The film and his performance was highly appreciated by both critics and audience, earning Shuvoo his first Meril Prothom Alo award for Best Actor He next went on to star in Shafi Uddin Shafi's Warning alongside Mahiya Mahi.

In 2016, Shuvoo starred in Ashiqur Rahman's Musafir. He then starred in Anonno Mamun's Ostitto which released in May 2016. He also starred in the Indo-Bangladeshi joint venture Niyoti, which was directed by Jakir Hossain Raju and was produced by Jaaz Multimedia and Eskay Movies.

In 2017, Shuvoo began the year with Jakir Hossain Raju's Premi O Premi and Shamim Ahamed Roni's Dhat Teri Ki, both being produced by Jaaz Multimedia and co-starring Nusrat Faria Mazhar. Regarding the former, the film and Shuvoo's performance were critically acclaimed.

The Daily Star critic Shah Alam Shazu wrote in 2020 that "Shuvoo has captivated the audience with his charming personality and acting prowess throughout his successful career".

In 2021, Shuvoo portrayed Nabid Al Shahriar, an additional deputy commissioner of police (ADC) in CTTC, in Sunny Sanwar and Faisal Ahmed's police action-thriller Mission Extreme. He reprised the role in the sequel, Black War: Mission Extreme 2. Shuvoo underwent rigorous dieting and training for the physically demanding character—a first in Bangladeshi cinema.

Shuvoo worked in a Chorki original movie Unish 20, which was directed by Mizanur Rahman Aryan and released on 13 February 2023. His performance as Apu in the film was loved and was critically acclaimed. This was his first web film and his nuanced performance - especially after the action film to the romantic genre - received positive reviews.

Shuvoo also starred in Bangabandhu Sheikh Mujibur Rahman's biopic Mujib: The Making of a Nation. Shuvoo starred as Sheikh Mujibur Rahman, the founding leader of Bangladesh, in Mujib: The Making of a Nation, a highly anticipated biographical film directed by Shyam Benegal. With the film tracing Mujibur Rahman’s journey from a young revolutionary to the Father of the Nation, Shuvoo’s portrayal earned acclaim from Naseeruddin Shah. The trailer of the film was released in the 75th Cannes International film festival, and the film was screened at 43rd Toronto International film festival.

Shuvoo's next few works include Raihan Rafi's Noor, produced by Shapla Media and Noyeem Imtiaz Neyamul's Jam, which is about a traffic jam and produced by Dhallywood Cinema Megastar Manna's Kritanjoli Kothachitra, Jazz City - Sony Liv webseries directed by Soumik Sen, Neel Chokro by Mithu Khan, and Lohu by Rahool Mukherjee for Chorki.

Shuvoo is a brand ambassador for Bata Bangladesh and Himalaya. He did a television commercial for Berger Paints.

== Personal life ==
On 6 February 2015, Shuvoo married Arpita Samaddar, an Indian fashion designer who worked for a company in Dhaka. On 31 July 2024, they split up.

On 4 September 2024, Rajuk announced the decision to cancel the plot allocated to Shuvoo under a reserved quota. Rajuk Chairman Major General Siddikur Rahman Sarkar confirmed the move as part of a broader initiative to revoke plots granted through political considerations from the former Prime Minister's office. Shuvoo had been allocated a 10-katha plot in the Purbachal New Town Project during a board meeting on 17 November 2023. Although he accepted the plot by paying the required fee, he was unable to register it in time. Following the ouster of the Awami League government on August 5, Rajuk reviewed politically motivated land allocations over the past 15 years, resulting in the decision to revoke Shuvoo's plot.

== Works ==
=== Feature films ===
Key
†	Denotes films that have not yet been released

Year	Film	Role	Notes	Ref.
2010	Jaago - Dare To Dream	Rafi	Debut film	
2013	Purno Doirgho Prem Kahini	Shakib Ahmed		
2013	Bhalobasha Zindabad	Sourav		
2014	Agnee	Shishir / Dragon	Also singer of "Shohena Jatona" song	
2014	Taarkata	Ibrahim		
2014	Kistimaat	Durjoy		
2015	Chuye Dile Mon	Abir Hasan		
2015	Warning	Zishan		
2015	Agnee 2	Shishir / Dragon	Indo-Bangladesh joint production, archive footage from Agnee	
2016	Musafir	Sunny		
2016	Ostitto	Imtu		
2016	Niyoti	Shuvro Chowdhury	Indo-Bangladesh joint production	
2016	Aynabaji	AC Sazzad	Cameo appearance	
2017	Premi O Premi	Shimanto		
2017	Dhat Teri Ki	Raj		
2017	Dhaka Attack	Abid Rahman		
2018	Bhalo Theko	Joy		
2018	Ekti Cinemar Golpo	Sajib		
2019	Ahaa Re	Farhaz Chowdhury / Raja	Debut in Indian Bengali film	
2019	Shapludu	Arman		
2021	Mission Extreme	SWAT Officer Nabid Al Shahriar		
2023	Black War: Mission Extreme 2	SWAT Officer Nabid Al Shahriar		
2023	Unish20	Opu	Released on Chorki	
2023	Mujib: The Making of a Nation	Sheikh Mujibur Rahman	Indo-Bangladesh joint production	
2025	NeelChokro	Faisal Shahriar		
2025	Mon Je Bojhena	Neel	Released after 12 years, filmed in 2013	
2025	Noor	Noor	Released on Bioscope+	
2026	Malik	Amir		
2026	Happily Married	Anisur Rahman Anis	Released on Chorki	
2026	Thikana Bangladesh †	TBA	Post-production	
2026	Mrittupuri: Kill Zone †	Raja	Unreleased	

=== Web series ===
Key
†	Denotes films that have not yet been released

Year	Title	Role	OTT	Notes	Ref.
2021	Contact	Tareq / BSTRD	ZEE5		
2024	Unishe April		Fridaay	Indian Bengali series	
2026	Jazz City	Jimmy Roy	SonyLIV	Indian Hindi series; based on Bangladesh Liberation War	

=== Short film ===
Year	Title	Role	Notes	Ref.
2019	Holly × Molly	Rana aka Molly	English short film on Amazon Prime	

== Awards and nominations ==
Year	Awards	Category	Film	Result
2013	Meril Prothom Alo Awards	Best Film Actor	Purno Doirgho Prem Kahini	Nominated
2013	Bioscope Borsho-sera	Best Villain	Purno Doirgho Prem Kahini	Won
2014	Meril Prothom Alo Awards	Best Film Actor (critics)	Taarkata	Won
2014	Meril Prothom Alo Awards	Best Film Actor	Agnee	Nominated
2015	Meril Prothom Alo Awards	Best Film Actor	Chuye Dile Mon	Won
2015	16th CJFB Performance Award	Best Film Actor	Chuye Dile Mon	Won
2016	Meril Prothom Alo Awards	Best Film Actor	Musafir	Nominated
2017	Atn Bangla Performance Award	Best Film Actor	Dhaka Attack	Nominated
2017	Meril Prothom Alo Awards	Best Film Actor	Dhaka Attack	Won
2018	Bangladesh National Film Awards	Best Film Actor	Dhaka Attack	Won
2018	Meril Prothom Alo Awards	Best Film Actor	Bhalo Theko	Nominated
2019	Meril Prothom Alo Awards	Best Film Actor	Shapludu	Nominated
2021	Meril Prothom Alo Awards	Best Film Actor	Mission Extreme	Nominated
