= ABM Sumon =

Bangladeshi model and actor

- এবিএম সুমন
- Born: May 27, 1984 (age 42); Barishal, Bangladesh
- Education: University of Dhaka
- Years active: 2013–present
- Known for: Actor
- Notable work: MR-9: Do or Die; Dhaka Attack
- Relatives: Taskeen Rahman (cousin)

ABM Azfar Uzzaman (born 27 May 1984), popularly known as ABM Sumon, is a Bangladeshi actor and model who predominantly works in Dhallywood cinema. He made his film debut in the romantic film Ochena Hridoy (2015).

His notable works include MR-9: Do or Die (2023) and Dhaka Attack (2023), which is one of the highest-grossing Bangladeshi films of all time.

== Career ==
Sumon's career began with ramp modeling. In addition to modeling, he started acting in various telefilms and TV series. In 2013, he first acted in a telefilm titled Megher Kole Roud. In the same year, he acted in NTV's series Nil Ronger Golpo.

In 2015, he made his debut as a lead role in the film Ochena Hridoy.

== Filmography ==
=== Films ===
Key
†	Denotes films that have not yet been released

Year	Films	Role	Notes	Ref.
2015	Ochena Hridoy	Rudro	Debut film	
2016	Rudro: The Gangster	Rudro		
2017	Dhaka Attack	Ashfaque Hossain		
2022	The Beauty Circus	Rangalal		
2022	Hridita	Kabir		
2023	Antarjal	ASP Raihan		
2023	MR-9: Do or Die	Masud Rana		
2024	Booking	Shihab	Released on Bongo	
2024	Fatima	Amanullah	Guest appearance	
2025	Soldier †	TBA	Filming	

=== Web series ===
Year	Series	Role	Notes	Ref.
2018	Indubala		Debut in web content	
2019	Kuwasha		Bioscope original series	
2020	Dhoka			
