= Humayun Kabir Sadhu =

Bangladeshi television director (1982–2019)

Humayun Sadhu
- হুমায়ূন সাধু
- Born: 1 May 1982; Chattogram, Bangladesh
- Died: 25 October 2019 (aged 37); Dhaka, Bangladesh
- Education: University of Dhaka
- Occupations: Director, actor, scriptwriter
- Notable work: Un Manush, Chikon Piner Charger

Humayun Kabir Sadhu (known as Humayun Sadhu; 1 May 1982 – 25 October 2019) was a Bangladeshi television director, scriptwriter and actor.

== Career ==
Sadhu, was a man who wore many hats, a film director, actor and writer. He started his professional journey as an assistant to Mostofa Sarwar Farooki, and developed a fondness for directing since then. His first telefilm Un Manush earned a huge response from the audience. He has also written the book, Nonai.

== Death ==
Sadhu died on 25 October 2019 after having a second stroke at Square Hospital in Dhaka.

== Works ==
=== Television Drama ===
Year	Drama	Co-Artist	Director	Network
2006	Un-Manush	Nusrat Imrose Tisha, Humayon sadhu, Marjuk Rasel, Iftekhar Ahmed Fahmi, Moinul Haque Oli, Ashfaque Nipun.	Mostofa Sarwar Farooki	
2007	Chikon Pin er Charger	Humayun Shadhu, Shahtaj Monira Hashem, Shabnam Sabrin, Rajani	Humayun Kabir Sadhu	
2014	Bhalobasha 101	Mehjabin Chowdhury, Mishu Sabbir, Siyam Ahmed, Safa Kabir, Salman Muktadir, Mumtahina Toya, Sayem Sadat, Safa Kabir,Salman Muktadir, Amili Jannat, Dilara Jaman, Tushar Khan, AlMamun, Shaju Khadem, Sumon Patwary, Majnun Mijan	Redwan Roni	
2017	AdorshoLipi	Aparna Ghose, Intekhab Dinar, Kachi Khondoker, Humayun Sadhu Mosharraf Karim Ahmed Faruk, Mo Mo Morshed, Monira Akter Mithu, Shamima Nazneen, Mukit Zakaria, Shaina Amin, ashfakul noman, Tarek Mahmood.	Hasan Morshed	

=== Films ===
Year	Film	Co-Artist	Director
	Made in Bangladesh		
	Sapludu		
	The Beauty Circus		
	Sat Vai Chmpa		
	Chorabali	Jaya Ahsan	
