= Black War: Mission Extreme 2 =

Black War:Mission Extreme 2
- Official Fourth Poster
- Black War
- Directed by: Sunny Sanwar and Faisal Ahmed
- Written by: Sunny Sanwar
- Screenplay by: Sunny Sanwar
- Story by: Sunny Sanwar
- Produced by: Rajnahar and Sunny Sanwar
- Starring: Arifin Shuvoo; Taskeen Rahman; Jannatul Ferdous Oishee; Sadia Nabila; Misha Shawdagar; Sumit Sen Gupta
- Music by: Meer Shahriar Hossain Masum; Nadim Bhuiyan
- Production company: Cop Creation
- Distributed by: Cop Creation
- Release date: 13 January 2023
- Running time: 130 minutes
- Country: Bangladesh
- Language: Bengali

Black War: Mission Extreme 2 is a Bangladeshi action thriller film produced by COP Creation. This is the sequel of the 2021 film Mission Extreme. It is directed by Sunny Sanwar and Faisal Ahmed. The film stars Arifin Shuvoo, Oishee, Sadia Nabila, Taskeen Rahman, Misha Sawdagor, and Sumit Sengupta in lead roles.

The film is the second part of a two-film series. This film was supposed to be released on 6 January 2023, but was rescheduled for release on 13 January 2023. The first part of this franchise was released in theatres on 3 December 2021.

== Cast ==
- Arifin Shuvoo as Nabid Al Shahriar, Additional Deputy Commissioner of Police (ADC), CTTC.
- Oishee as Sylvi
- Taskeen Rahman as Khalid
- Sadia Nabila as AC Era / Yasmin Begum
- Sumit Sengupta as AC Shohid
- Sudip Biswas Deep
- Raisul Islam Asad as Dr. Afzal Asif
- Fazlur Rahman Babu as Dibba Babu
- Iresh Zaker as Tarek
- Shahiduzzaman Selim as Police Commissioner
- Shatabdi Wadud as DC Mahabub
- Shams Sumon
- Manoj Pramanik as Rana
- Maznun Mizan as Salehin
- Misha Sawdagor as Khan
- Aref Syed as Jayesh
- Syed Hasan Imam (actor) as Home Minister
- Khalid Hasan Rumi
- Bobby as special appearance in the song "Chalao Guli".

== Production ==
=== Pre-production ===
After the success of Dhaka Attack (2017) and Mission Extreme (2021), Sunny Sarwar announced to make the sequel of Mission Extreme. The sequel Black War: Mission Extreme 2 takes place after the end of Mission Extreme.

== Release ==
The film was supposed to be released on January 6, 2023, but it was rescheduled to release on January 13, 2023. Black War: Mission Extreme 2 was released in 44 theaters across the country on January 13, 2023. The film also released in Australia on February 10, 2023 Black War: Mission Extreme 2 released in the US as well on March 31, 2023. The film released on streaming services in April 20 at Bioscope

== Soundtrack ==
Meer Shahriar Hossain Masum & Nadim Bhuiyan were the music composer for the film

No.	Title	Lyrics	Singer(s)	Length	Ref.
1	Chalao Guli	Muktader Mawla	Nasha & Meer Shahriar Hossain Masum	3:59	
2	Maa	Nadim Bhuiyan	Mainul Ahsan Noble	4:17	

== Reception ==
=== Critical response ===
The Daily Star praised the movie saying "those who like to watch action thriller movies will definitely love Black War on the big screen". NatunNews Monitor called Black War: Mission Extreme 2 a massive improvement over the first one and said "Black war deserves praise for what it showed". On the review of Bangla Movie database, they gave the film a 8/10 rating and called Black War: Mission Extreme 2 "better movie than Mission Extreme" giving it a strong recommendation to the audience.
