= Ziaul Faruq Apurba =

Bangladeshi actor (born 1980)

Ziaul Faruque Apurba
- জিয়াউল ফারুক অপূর্ব
- Born: 27 June 1985 (age 41)
- Other name: Apurba
- Occupations: Actor; model; director; playback singer
- Years active: 2004–present
- Spouses: Sadia Jahan Prova (m. 2010; div. 2011); Nazia Hassan Audity (m. 2011; div. 2020); Trisha Dewan (m. 2021)
- Awards: Meril Prothom Alo Public Choice Award for Best TV Actor 2018; ATN Bangla Performance Award for Best TV Actor 2017; Rtv Star Award One Hour Drama & Telefilm for Best Actor 2020

Ziaul Faruq Apurba (born 27 June 1985) is a Bangladeshi model and actor. He usually works in Bangladeshi television and Dhallywood cinema. He made his debut in the silver screen with the film Gangster Returns (2015)

== Early life ==
Apurba's mother, Firoza Ahmed, was an artist of Rajshahi Betar and his maternal grandmother was a presenter in Rajshahi Betar. He won the title of "Mr. Bangladesh" in 2004 in the talent hunt show named "You Got the Looks".

== Career ==
Apurba started his career in Gazi Rakayet's drama Boibahik in 2006. He made his debut as a model in Amitabh Reza Chowdhury's directed TV commercial for Nescafe. His TV commercial for Lab Aid also got popularity. Apurba had set up a production house named "ASI Creations Limited" and started directing through the telefilm titled Backdated in 2012. He voiced the title track of Shihab Shaheen's drama serial Bhalobasar Chotuskone.

Apurba's debut film is Gangster Returns, released on 27 November 2015, directed by Ashiqur Rahman. He was also cast in a film, Brishti Din, directed by Morshedul Islam, but it was cancelled after a few days shooting. He is also a playback singer.

== Personal life ==
Apurba married model and actress Sadia Jahan Prova in August 2010. The couple was divorced in February 2011. He later married Nazia Hassan Audity in December of the same year. They were divorced on May 17, 2020. They have a son. In September 2021, he married Trisha Dewan. In February 2026, Apurba announced the birth of his daughter.

== Filmography ==
Year	Films	Roles	Director	Notes	Ref.
2015	Gangster Returns	Shaon	Ashiqur Rahman		
2022	Mayashalik	Ovi	Shihab Shaheen	Released on Binge	
2024	Chaalchitro: The Frame Fatale	Killer	Pratim D. Gupta	Indian film; Extended cameo appearance	

== Television ==
Year	Title	Director/Scriptwriter	Notes
2006	Choker Baire	Faruk Srabon	Tinni
2007	Mohanagar	Ferdous Hasan	Sumaiya
2007	Sure O Banir Mala Diye	Ferdous Hasan	Sumaiya
2007	Jete Pari Kintu Keno Jabo	Chayanika Chowdhury	Richi
2007	Astittwo Anubhobe	B U Shuvo	
2007	Chena Chena Lagey	B U Shuvo	Shokh
2007	Romizer Ayna	Shihab Shaheen	Tinni
	Dohon	Chayanika Chowdhury	Richi Solaiman
2008	Swapner Nil Pori	Chayanika Chowdhury	Tinni
2008	Bhalobashar Shuru	Chayanika Chowdhury	Tinni. Song:Shudhu Tumay Bhebe Bhebe
2008	Khunjey Pawa	Chayanika Chowdhury	
2008	Paliye Giye Biye Abong Dolonchapa	Chayanika Chowdhury	Prova
2008	X Factor 1	Shihab Shaheen	Mithila, Monalisa
2009	Ei Shohore Dujon Manush	Sajjad Sumon	
2009	Khunsutike Dilam Chhuti	Diti	Directorial debut of Diti
2009	Kosto Chuye Dekho	Taher Shipon	Prova. Song:Amar E Mon Sharatakon
2009	Aschorjo Ek Rater Golpo	Chayanika Chowdhury	Prova
2009	X Factor 2	Shihab Shaheen	Prova
2010	Shayonne	Chayanika Chowdhury	Tinni
2010	X Factor 3 - Game Over	Shihab Shaheen	Momo
2010	Aloker Ei Jhornadhara	Chayanika Chowdhury	Tinni
2010	Pakhir Danay Bhor	Chayanika Chowdhury	Prova. TV Series
2011	Path Jana Nai	Fakhrul Alam	Prova, Tanjika. TV Series
2011	Nil Bedonay Lal Kosto	Juwel Mahmud	Moushmi H
2012	Nupur	Chayanika Chowdhury	Tarin
2012	Basboi Bhalo	SA Haque Alik	Purnima
2012	Backdated	Apurba	Sarika. Directorial debut
2013	Ei Maya	Chayanika Chowdhury	Tinni.
2013	Bhalobashar Chotushkone	Shihab Shaheen	Momo. TV Serial - Lend voice in title track
2013	Bhor Holo Dor Khulo	Chayanika Chowdhury	Tania
2013	Oviman	Chayanika Chowdhury	Nadia
2013	Shomoyer Golpo Ashomoyer Shopno	Mehedi Hasan Jony	Peya, Azmeri
2013	Biyer Boyos Baro	Ferdous Hasan	Sumaiya
2013	Sorishai Bhoot	Ferdous Hasan	Sumaiya
2013	Uttam Kumar-Suchitra Sen	Chayanika Chowdhury	Opi
2013	Oporanhe/Obelay	Chayanika Chowdhury	Kushum
2013	Mayaghor	Chayanika Chowdhury	Richi
2013	Obosheshe Annyorokom	Shafiqur Rahman Santunu	
2014	Sukher Betha	Chayanika Chowdhury	Richi
2014	Boshonte Esho	Chayanika Chowdhury	Richi
2014	Megh Maa	Masum Reza	Bindu
2014	Uttorer Baranday Dokhina Hawa	Sunny Chowdhury	Mithila
2014	Je Jole Agun Jole	Asaduzzaman Sohag	Sumaiya
2014	Bikeman	Naznin Hasan Chumki	Mehzabin
2014	Black Coffee	Sakhawat Hossain Manik	Mou
2014	Amake Diye Kichu Hobena	Khairul Bashar Nirjhor	Anny
2014	Is Not Equal	Rashed Raha	Jenny
2014	Raja Ranir Khela	Kaushik Sankar Das	Ashna Habib Bhabna
2014	Shopno Ghuri	Chayanika Chowdhury	Sonia
2014	Bihobol Dishehara	Sagor Jahan	Anika Kabir Shokh
2014	Oshomapto Trivuj	Sakhawat Hossain Manik	Sadia Islam Mou
2014	I Miss You	Sakhawat Hossain Manik	Sadia Islam Mou
2015	Bonna Tomar Jonno	Chayanika Chowdhury	Zakia Bari Momo
2015	Broken Heart	Nasim	Sadia Islam Mou
2015	Meher Nigar	B U Shuvo	Shokh
2015	Sobar Upore Maa	Rumman Rashid Khan	Nowshin
2015	Bondhu Tumi Bondhu Amar	SA Haque Alik	Tareen Jahan
2015	Bhalobashar Faad	Kawshik Sankar Das	Tareen Jahan
2015	Jochonay Ojana Pothchola	Mominul Huq	Aparna Ghosh
2015	Ekhono Ami	Mizanur Rahman Aryan	Momo
2015	Lake Drive Lane	Mesbah Uddin Shumon	Taniya H
2015	Life In Metro		TV series with Moushumi Hamid
2015	Airbender	Taneem Rahman Angshu	Sharlin
2015	The Miser	Mehedi Hasan Jony	Sharlin
2015	Kaktaruar Prem	Mehedi Hasan Jony	Nazira
2021	Jodi..Kintu..Tobou	Shihab Shaheen	Web film
2022	Boyosh Kono Baper Na	Jakaria Shoukhin	Keya Payel
2022	Kagojer Biye	S R Mozumder	Sabila Nur
2022	Mr. Cool		Tasnia Farin
2024	Mr. Absent Minded	Rubel Hasan	Tanjim Saiara Totini
2025	Mon Duare	Jakaria Showkin	Naznin Nahar Niha
2025	Meghbalika	Jakaria Showkin	Naznin Nahar Niha
2025	Ghran	Masrikul Alam	Naznin Nahar Niha
2026	Mayapakhi	Jakaria Showkin	Naznin Nahar Niha
2026	Ochena Ami	Taneem Rahman Angshu	Naznin Nahar Niha

== Web series ==
Year	Title	Role	Notes	Ref.
2021	Chena Pother Oporichita			
2021	Kuhok			
2023	Buker Moddhe Agun	ASP Golam Mamun	Released on Hoichoi	
2024	Golam Mamun	ASP Golam Mamun	Released on Hoichoi	
2026	Headline	Journalist Jahir Ahmed	Released on Hoichoi	

=== TV program ===
Year	Program	Anchor	Channel
2014	Late Night Coffee	Nusrat Faria Mazhar & Abir	Rtv
