= Assistant commissioner of police =

Rank in police forces

Assistant commissioner or assistant commissioner of police (ACP) is a rank used in various police forces.

In the Commonwealth of Nations, it may either be a senior rank analogous to major-general (as is the case in the United Kingdom, Australia, New Zealand, Ireland, Singapore and Hong Kong) or a junior rank roughly equivalent to captain (as is the case in India and Bangladesh).

== Australia ==
In all Australian police forces, assistant commissioner is the rank below deputy commissioner. It is senior to the rank of commander in the South Australia Police and Victoria Police, superintendent in the Western Australia Police and NSW Police Force, and chief superintendent in the Queensland Police Service. In all services, the insignia consists of crossed tipstaves within a wreath.

== Bangladesh ==
In the Bangladesh Police, assistant commissioner of police is the entry-level post for cadre officers posted in metropolitan areas, equivalent to assistant superintendent of police in other areas.

== Canada ==
The Royal Canadian Mounted Police has 26 officers with the rank and it is the third highest rank in the command structure of the force.

== Hong Kong ==
The Hong Kong Police Force has the ranks of assistant commissioner of police (ACP) and senior assistant commissioner of police (SACP).

== India ==
In the Indian police, assistant commissioner of police is only used in metropolitan areas and is equivalent to deputy superintendent of police in other areas. Officers of this rank may belong to the state police services. The rank insignia is three silver stars over the name of the state in which they are working without a red or blue strip.

Insignia of assistant commissioner of police (ACP)

== Ireland ==
In the Garda Síochána, the Republic of Ireland's national police force, the rank of assistant commissioner is between chief superintendent and deputy commissioner.

== New Zealand ==
In the New Zealand Police, the rank of assistant commissioner is junior to the rank of deputy commissioner and is senior to the rank of superintendent. It is the highest rank that can be achieved by a sworn member without statutory appointment. There are currently five assistant commissioners. The rank insignia is three stars in a triangle shape with a single crown above.

== Papua New Guinea ==
In Papua New Guinea, assistant commissioner is the rank between chief superintendent and deputy commissioner.

== Singapore ==
In the Singapore Police Force, the rank may be held by staff department heads or directors.

== United Kingdom ==
Epaulette of a Metropolitan Police assistant commissioner

Assistant Commissioner of Police of the Metropolis (AC) is the third highest rank in the London Metropolitan Police, ranking between deputy assistant commissioner and Deputy Commissioner of Police of the Metropolis. The assistant commissioner is also the second-in-command of the City of London Police, ranking between commander and commissioner. The rank is not used in other British police forces.

== See also ==
- Police commissioner
- Assistant commissioner (administration)
