= Assistant commissioner (administration) =

Rank used in South Asian revenue administrations

Assistant commissioner is a rank used in revenue administrations, including those of Bangladesh, India, and Pakistan.

== Description ==
Assistant commissioner is a rank used in revenue administrations (land, income tax, customs, inland, etc.) in various countries.

== Use in countries ==
=== Bangladesh ===
In Bangladesh, Assistant Commissioner is the entry level post for some of the cadre services. It is a Grade-9 post. This rank is used in services like Administration, Taxation, Customs and Police. Assistant Commissioner is the entry level rank for the officers of Administration cadre. They play vital role in field administration. At first, they are posted at office of the Deputy Commissioner in Districts. As Executive Magistrates, they conduct mobile courts under the Mobile Court Act, 2009. The officers recruited in Taxation service through BCS exams start their career as Assistant Commissioner of Taxes (ACT).

=== India ===
In India, the rank of Assistant Commissioner is used in Indian Income Tax, Customs, Central Excise and Service Tax Administration, as an officer of Indian Revenue.

In Revenue Department of the states, an Assistant Commissioner is incharge of a revenue sub-division of the district. The Assistant Commissioner is also the sub divisional magistrate of the sub-division. The Assistant Commissioner supervise taluka/tehsil offices under them, and reports to Deputy Commissioner/District Magistrate. They are tasked with land revenue administration.

=== Pakistan ===
In Pakistan, assistant commissioner is a key Grade-17 administrative officer and representative of government in tehsil, an administrative unit in a district. Assistant commissioner belongs to the commission of Pakistan Administrative Service or Provincial Management Service. They are responsible for executive, revenue and magisterial duties and the main representative of the governments at the tehsil level.
