= Super Hero (film) =

Bangladeshi action spy thriller film

- Super Hero movie poster
- Bengali: সুপার হিরো
- Directed by: Ashiqur Rahman
- Written by: Delowar Hossain Dil
- Produced by: Taposhi Farooq
- Starring: Shakib Khan; Shabnom Bubly; Shampa Reza; Tariq Anam Khan; Tiger Robi
- Music by: Akassh; Ali Akram Shuvo; Naved Parvez
- Production company: Heartbeat Production
- Distributed by: Heartbeat Production
- Release date: 16 June 2018
- Running time: 146 minutes
- Country: Bangladesh
- Language: Bengali

"Super Hero" is a 2018 Bangladeshi action spy thriller film. The film was directed by Ashiqur Rahman and produced by Taposhi Farooq. The film was distributed by Heartbeat Production. It features Shakib Khan and Shabnom Bubly in lead roles, and Tiger Robi, Shampa Reza and Tariq Anam Khan in other roles.

It is the first Bangladeshi film to have been filmed in Australia.

== Cast ==
- Shakib Khan - Iqbal Mahmud Sami, a Special Force officer
- Shabnom Bubly - Swapna Miliana Sima, Sami's love interest
- Tiger Robi - Junaid
- Salman Arif - Pitar
- Sadek Bacchu - Kamal, Sami's father
- Shampa Reza
- Mahmudul Islam Mithu
- Tariq Anam Khan - K.M. Khalil, a Bangladeshi missile specialist scientist
- Cindy Rolling

== Soundtrack ==
Super Hero: Original Motion Picture Soundtrack

Soundtrack album by Akassh, Ali Akram Shuvo and Naved Parbez
- Released: 16 June 2018
- Genre: Feature Film Soundtrack
- Language: Bangla
- Label: Unlimited Audio Video

Singles from Super Hero: Original Motion Picture Soundtrack
- 1. "Boom Boom" Released: 8 June 2018; 2. "Tomake Apon Kore (তোমাকে আপন করে)" Released: 12 June 2018; 3. "Ek Poloke (এক পলকে)" Released: 17 June 2018

The film soundtrack was composed by Akassh, Ali Akram Shuvo and Naved Parvez. The first song of film titled "Boom Boom" was released on Live Technologies's YouTube channel on 8 June 2018 as a promotional track. The song was sung by Protik Hasan and Shourin written by Sudip Kumar Dip and composed by Naved Parvez.

Track list
| No. | Title | Lyrics | Music | Singer(s) | Length |
|---|---|---|---|---|---|
| 1. | "Boom Boom" | Sudip Kumar Dip | Naved Parvez | Protic Hasan, Sourin | 2:50 |
| 2. | "Tomake Apon Kore (তোমাকে আপন করে)" | Rabiul Islam Jibon | Akassh | Akassh, Trisha Chatterjee | 4:07 |
| 3. | "Ek Poloke (এক পলকে)" | Sudip Kumar Dip | Ali Akram Shuvo | Imran Mahmudul, Dilshad Nahar Kona | 3:16 |
| 4. | "Sona Bondhe" (Amare Dewana Banailo) | Sudip Kumar Dip | Ali Akram Shuvo | Rashed, Ruma | 4:27 |
| Total length: | | | | | 14:40 |

== Release ==
The film was released in 80 theatres around the country on 16 June 2018.

== Reception ==
In the Dhaka Tribune, Rummana Foisal Nafiu found the film entertaining despite a clichéd plot and poor visual effects and audio. Nafiu was especially critical of the out-of-sync dialogue, that caused by low quality Automated dialogue replacement (ADR).
