= The Beauty Circus =

2022 Bangladeshi drama film

- Poster
- Directed by: Mahmud Didar
- Written by: Nakib Jahan; Sajedul Islam Shimanto
- Produced by: Faridur Reza Sagar
- Starring: ABM Sumon; Jaya Ahsan; Ferdous Ahmed; Tauquir Ahmed
- Cinematography: Kamrul Islam Shuvo
- Edited by: Mahi Islam Mitul; Mahmud Didar
- Music by: Pavel Arin
- Production company: Impress Telefilm
- Distributed by: Channel i
- Release date: 23 November 2022
- Country: Bangladesh
- Language: Bengali

The Beauty Circus is a 2022 Bangladeshi drama film directed by Mahmud Didar. The film was produced by Faridur Reza Sagar under the banner of Impress Telefilm. It is stars ABM Sumon, Jaya Ahsan, Ferdous Ahmed, Tauquir Ahmed, Shatabdi Wadud, Gazi Rakayet, Humayun Sadhu and others. The film was granted by the Government of the People's Republic of Bangladesh.

== Cast ==
- ABM Sumon
- Jaya Ahsan
- Ferdous Ahmed
- Tauquir Ahmed
- Shatabdi Wadud
- Gazi Rakayet
- Humayun Sadhu

== Release ==
The film was released in Bangladeshi 19 theaters on 23 September 2022.

== Awards ==
Year	Award	Category	Winner	Result	Ref.
2022	National Film Award	Best Film Actress (jointly with Reekita Nondine Shimu)	Jaya Ahsan	Won	
