= Muhin Khan =

Bangladeshi singer

Muhin Khan মুহিন
- Born: 21 April
- Origin: Bangladesh
- Genres: Adhunik Bangla, pop
- Occupation: Singer
- Years active: 2006–present
- Labels: Sangeeta, Agniveena, Golpo Entertainment
- Website: www.musicmuhin.com

Muhin Khan (born 21 April), commonly known mononymously as Muhin, is a Bangladeshi singer. He participated in the 2006 CloseUp1 Tomakei Khujchhe Bangladesh musical talent TV show. Despite widespread predictions he would win, Muhin placed second to Salma.

His style of music is known as Adhunik Bangla, with the word 'adhunik' meaning 'modern' in Bengali. He was originally signed to the Sangeeta and released his first album, Tomar Jonno, written and produced in conjunction with Bappa Mazumder, in 2008 The album included the hit track "Ektai Prokalpo".

His album Ghum Ashe Na was released in late 2011. Music videos to two of the tracks were released to promote the album, "Ghum Ashe Na" and "Shopno". His most recent full studio album, titled Kolijai Lagerey, was released in 2017. The album was released through his own production company, Golpo Entertainment. The first promotional music video was produced in conjunction with Meer Shahriar Hossain Masum of Souls.

In addition to frequent TV singing performances, Muhin has also dabbled in acting, appearing in a TV drama.

As a Music Director, Muhin has worked with many established and rising singers, including Sayed Abdul Hadi, Kumar Biswajit, Fahmida Nabi, Subir Nandi, Nishita, Sabbir, Kishore, Badhon, Nandita, Luipa, Pulak, Salma, Ronti, Liza, Palash and Putul amongst others; in addition to a joint project with Rajib, Zhilik and Swaralipi. Internationally in India he has tuned songs for Kumar Sanu, Shuvomita and Raghab Chatterjee.

Muhin continues to both produce and record music, in addition to performing live in many countries around the world.

== Discography ==
- Tomar Jonno (2008)
- Gopon Kotha (2009)
- Kotota Rat Eka (2010), joint album release with Asif
- Ghum Ashe Na (2011)
- Dhoom Dharakka (2014)
- Kolijaye Lage Re (2017)

== Selected singles and tracks on compilation albums ==
- Biday, Boka – Prince Mahmud & Closeup-1 (2006), Gaanchill.
- Ridoy Jekhane, credited to Muhin & Ronty, Shubho Bibaho – Soundtrack (2008), Laser Vision.
- Onubhuti, Kheyali Mon – Titon Mix featuring Various Artists (2009), Laser Vision.
- Lage Nato Vhalo, credited to Porshi & Muhin, Pirates: The Blood Secret/Jolodoshu: Rokto Rohosho – Soundtrack (2010), Geetali.
- Chotobelay Ichche Chilo, Mix – Huckleberry Finn (2011), Agniveena.
- Uru Uru Mon, credited to Muhin & Ronti, Payra – Soundtrack (2012), Deadline Music.
- Tomake Chai, credited to Muhin & Mukta, All Time – DJ Rahat (2012), Deadline Music.
- Ami Jake Bhalobashi, 100% Love – Various Artists (2012), CD Choice.
- Chokher Arale, credited to Purnata with Muhin, Purnata (2013), CD Choice.
- Premer Tajmahal, credited to Sonia, Muhin, Ronty & Kishore, Purno Doirgho Prem Kahini – Soundtrack (2013), Laser Vision.
- Ki Lav Bolo, credited to Muhin & Lopa, Tui Ebong Toke – Lutfor Hasan & Various Artists (2014), Eagle Music.
- Cholo Aaj Brishtite, credited to Muhin & Shoshi
- Gane Gane Tumi – Various Artists (2014), Laser Vision.
- Lukochuri Chokh [digital single], credited to Nirjhor & Muhin (2016), Protune.
- Bristir Meye, credited to Muhin, Badoler Rin – Various Artists (2017), Agniveena.
- Dohon [digital single] (2018), E-Music.
- Pother Prem [digital single] (2020), Protune.
- Shopno [digital single] (2020), VR Music.
