= Pareshaan Parinda =

Hindi film

Pereshaan Parinda
- Directed by: Devesh Pratap Singh
- Produced by: Rachel Singh
- Starring: Meeraj Shah; Sakshi Singh; Avtar Singh Bhullar; Sadia Nabila
- Cinematography: Gilbert Rae
- Music by: Tapeshvar kalia, Ravinder Bhinder, Johny Seth
- Release date: 23 March 2018 (India)
- Country: India
- Language: Hindi

Pereshaan Parinda is a 2018 Indian Hindi-language romantic action film directed by Devesh Pratap Singh and produced by Rachel Singh. The film starring Meeraj Shah, Sakshi Singh, Avtar Singh Bhullar and Sadia Nabila in lead roles. This film is the debut film of Bangladesh-born actress Sadia Nabila. It was released on 23 March 2018. The film was shot in Australia.

== Cast ==
- Meeraj Shah - Neel
- Sakshi Singh - Mini
- Avtar Singh Bhullar - Jai
- Sadia Nabila - Reena
- Dave Sidhu - Rohan
- KP Sandhu - Rocky
- Pankaj Kumar - Raja Bhai
- King Chouhan - Veer
- Pallavi Sharma - Maya Devi
- Rashmi Ravindran - Rhea
- Guru Dha - Gangster

== Soundtrack ==
Pareshaan Parinda : Original Motion Picture Soundtrack

Soundtrack album
- Language: Hindi
- Label: T Series
External audio
- Audio Jukebox on YouTube

Pareshaan Parinda (Original Motion Picture Soundtrack)
No.	Title	Singer(s)	Length
1.	"Ho Jaye Balle Balle"	Ravinder Bhinder	3.34
2.	"Zabt E Dil"	Tapeshvar Kalia	5.13
3.	"Memsaab"	Johny Seth	2.72
Total length:			11.19
