= Dhaka Attack =

- First Look Poster
- Directed by: Dipankar Dipon
- Written by: Abhimanyu Mukherjee; Shahjahan Shourov; Asad Zaman
- Screenplay by: Abhimanyu Mukherje; Dipankar Dipon; Sunny Sanwar; Hasanat Bin Matin
- Story by: Sunny Sanwar
- Produced by: Kaiser Ahammed; Sunny Sanwar
- Starring: Arifin Shuvoo; Mahiya Mahi; Taskeen Rahman; Afzal Hossain; ABM Sumon; Alamgir; Syed Hasan Imam; Shatabdi Wadud
- Cinematography: Gopi Bhagat; Archit Patel; Daven Raghban; Nayeem Fuad; Souvik Basu; Khair Khandakar; Nayeem Fuad
- Edited by: Md. Kalam
- Music by: Adit; DJ Rahat; Dabbu; Autumnal Moon
- Production companies: Three Wheelers Ltd.; Splash Multimedia; Bangladesh Police Paribar Kallyan Samity Ltd.
- Distributed by: The Abhi Kathachitra; Swapna Scarecrow
- Release dates: 6 October 2017 (Bangladesh); 20 October 2017 (U.S.); 27 October 2017 (Worldwide)
- Running time: 147 minutes
- Country: Bangladesh
- Language: Bengali
- Box office: ৳95 million (equivalent to ৳150 million or US$1.3 million in 2024)

Dhaka Attack (Bengali: ঢাকা অ্যাটাক) is a Bangladeshi cop action thriller film produced by Bangladesh Police Paribar Kallyan Samity Ltd., Three Wheelers Ltd. and Splash Multimedia. It features Arifin Shuvoo, Mahiya Mahi, ABM Sumon and Taskeen Rahman in the lead roles. It was directed by Dipankar Dipon and written by Sunny Sanwar. The film was distributed by The Abhi Kathachitra and Swapna Scarecrow. The film won the "Best Film" award in 42nd Bangladesh National Film Awards.

== Plot ==
The story starts in a remote desert area with a shady deal between two people, then suddenly shifts to Dhaka. A group of armed hooligans attack a chemical factory at night, kill the guards and steal some highly dangerous chemicals. The police are put on high alert.

The next day, those same chemicals are used to make a powerful bomb. That bomb explodes in front of a school just before a school bus arrives — many small children are killed. The whole city panics.

The police find that the killers of the chemical factory were themselves murdered by someone else, and the new killer has left a strange clue — he drew a smiley face on the dead bodies. Next day, every newspaper headline is "Smiley on the Corpse's Body" and fear spreads in Dhaka.

The police's Bomb Disposal Unit and SWAT (Bangladesh) team are called into action. But the mastermind keeps misguiding them. He makes hundreds of fake bomb-threat calls to the police emergency helpline, so the police keep running to false locations and waste time.

While investigating, the police trace a car that was used for the school bombing. Chasing the car thief leads them to a bigger hideout, and from there they get more clues. They realize this is not a normal terrorist — he is playing a game.

With the help of Malaysian police, they finally identify him — a top criminal of the Malaysian underground named Azimul Karim Jisan, who is a drug-addicted psycho killer. Jisan was once attacked by Malaysian police but escaped and fled to Bangladesh to meet his uncle and set up a new empire to rule the international mafia.

Meanwhile, a crime journalist keeps following the police, she has extra information about the criminal circle and helps them. The police also discover the whole plan is part of a bigger plot by some foreign intelligence agencies to destabilize Bangladesh and destroy its defence layers.

In the final operation, the Bomb Disposal Unit, DB and SWAT Bangladesh join together. They raid Jisan's secret den in Dhaka, defuse live bombs, and in a massive shootout, they finally bring down the man behind the Dhaka Attack.

== Cast ==
Superintendent of Police (SP) of Rangpur Biplob Kumar Sarkar in Dhaka attack movie scene.

- Arifin Shuvoo as Abid Rahman, Assistant commissioner of DMP Detective Branch, and in-charge of Bomb Disposal Unit.
- Mahiya Mahi as Chaity, a crime journalist
- ABM Sumon as AC Ashfaq Hossain, In-charge of SWAT Special Forces Commander
- Taskeen Rahman as Azimul Karim Zishan, a serial killer
- Afzal Hossain as the DMP Commissioner
- Syed Hasan Imam as the Minister of Home Affairs
- Shatabdi Wadud as ADC Sajedul Karim, Bangladesh Police Intelligence Unit officer
- Quazi Nawshaba Ahmed as Sinthia, Ashfaq's wife
- Salina Saibi as Malaysian Police Officer.
- Alamgir as Alamgir, the Inspector-general of Bangladesh Police, in a special appearance
- Shipan Mitra as AC Rahat, in a special appearance
- Lamia Mimo in a special appearance in song "Tikatuli"
- Sanj John in a special appearance in song "Tikatuli"
- Fahrin Ahmad as Malaysian Police Officer.

== Production ==
The filming officially began on 29 December 2015 at Pan Pacific Sonargaon. The film was first announced by Three Wheelers Films during early 2015, The film was to be directed by Dipankar Sengupta and Arifin Shuvo and Mahiya Mahi were signed as the lead actors. Riaz Uddin Ahamed Siddique was confirmed to join the cast in September 2015, but later opted out and replaced by ABM Sumon. The movie was shot in Dhaka, Chittagong, Bandarban and Mumbai. The first poster of the film released on 6 October 2017.

== Costume design ==
The film's costumes were designed by Nazmee Jannat and Sunny Sanwar. Nazmee said in an interview that whole team preferred "a very 'real' look", similar to that of Bangladesh Police, and wore relevant dresses those go with different critical situation throughout the movie.

== Soundtrack ==
Dhaka Attack

Soundtrack album by Adit, DJ Rahat, Dabbu, Automonal Moon, and Arindom
- Released: 2017
- Genre: Soundtrack
- Label: Tiger Media Limited
- Producers: Adit; DJ Rahat; Dabbu; Automonal Moon; Arindom

The soundtrack of Dhaka Attack was composed by Adit, DJ Rahat, Dabbu, Automonal Moon and Arindom. Indian singer Arijit Singh made his Bangladeshi debut, who has previously sung for India-Bangladesh co-productions.

=== Track listing ===
No.	Title	Lyrics	Music	Singer(s)	Length
1.	"Tikatuli" (Originally Composed by Shahin Kamal)	Motin Chowdhury & Mamun Akand	DJ Rahat & Mir Masum	Motin Chowdhury	4:31
2.	"Tup Tap"	Anindya Chatterjee	Arindom	Arijit Singh and Somlata Acharyya Chowdhury	4:09
3.	"Poth Je Daake"	Asif Iqbal	Adit	Adit	3:45
4.	"Dhaka Attack (Title track)"	Satrujit Dasgupta	Dabbu	Satrujit Dasgupta	2:31
5.	"Anondopur"	Automonal Moon	Automonal Moon	Automonal Moon	1:47

== Release ==
The film was released in three languages: Bengali, Malay, and English. The film was released on 6 October 2017 in Bangladesh, with worldwide release due on 20 October 2017.
