= Kistimaat =

- Kistimaat film poster
- Directed by: Ashiqur Rahman
- Screenplay by: Kashem Ali Dulal
- Story by: Kashem Ali Dulal
- Produced by: Mohammad Riyad Hossain; Kamal Hasan
- Starring: Arifin Shuvoo; Achol; Misha Sawdagor
- Cinematography: Ashiqur Rahman
- Music by: Shouquat Ali Imon; Imran; Shochi Shams
- Production companies: Tiger Media Limited; The Abhi Kathachitra
- Distributed by: Tiger Media Limited; The Abhi Kathachitra
- Release date: 6 October 2014
- Country: Bangladesh
- Language: Bengali

Kistimaat (Bengali: কিস্তিমাত, lit. 'Checkmate') is a 2014 Bangladeshi action film directed by Ashiqur Rahman and produced by Tiger Media Limited and The Abhi Pictures. The film features Arifin Shuvoo and Achol Akhe in lead roles while Misha Sawdagor plays the role of Lion Robi. The film is about a police officer and his fight against corruption. The film was released on Eid-ul-Adha, 6 October 2014, and was a commercial success.

== Plot ==
The story is about Durjoy (Arifin Shuvoo), a ruthless and arrogant police officer who does what he believes is right. Piya is attracted to him (Achol) and thinks Durjoy is a gangster but still has a soft spot for him in her heart. One day, Lion Robi (Misha Sawdagor), a leader of a big organized crime syndicate tries to strike a deal with Durjoy but fails as Durjoy insults him. Raged in anger, Lion Robi promises to make Durjoy's life difficult and destroy the structure of the Police force.

Both Durjoy and Piya, are unable to express their love to each other until one day, when Lion Robi's brother Tiger Robi enters the love story and tries to marry Piya forcefully. Knowing that, Durjoy rages in anger, and mercilessly Kills Tiger Robi. After finding out about the death of his brother, Lion Robi vows to kill Durjoy and begins by killing Durjoy's allies in the police department. Before his death, the police commissioner reveals to Durjoy that his father was once a police commissioner until he got murdered by Lion Robi for not assisting in his illegal businesses. In the end of the film, Durjoy kills Lion Robi, and destroys all his illegal organizations. The film ends showing both Durjoy and Piya happily living their life.

== Cast ==
- Arifin Shuvoo as Durjoy Chowdhury, a police officer
- Achol as Piya, Durjoy's love interest and an aspiring actress.
- Misha Sawdagor as Lion Robi, leader of a large criminal organization
- Tiger Robi and himself, owner of a film production company and brother of Lion Robi
- Subrata as Durjoy's father, a former police officer
- Rebeka Rouf as Durjoy's mother
- Kaniz as Momota, Durjoy's sister
- Afzal Sharif as Mia Moti, a corrupt police officer allied with Lion Robi, later joins Durjoy
- Harun Kisinger
- Mirakkel Shojol
- Habib Khan
- Komol Patekar
- Jadu Azad

== Music ==
The film includes a total of five songs written by Zahid Hasan Abhi and features Imran, Porshi, Puja, Kona and others as playback singers. The songs are composed by Shouquat Ali Imon, Imran, Naved and Shochi Sams.

Kistimaat (Original Motion Picture Soundtrack)

Soundtrack album by Porshi, Shahin, Imran, Puja, Tasif, Kona, Shochi Shams, Tonima, Zaki Ahmad & Tahsin
- Released: 6 October 2014
- Genre: Feature film soundtrack
- Label: Tiger Media / HTM Records (Digital Partner)

Track listing
No.	Title	Music	Singer(s)	Length
1.	"Shudhu Ekbar Bolo"	Naved	Porshi, Shahin & Tahsin	5:13
2.	"Shopnei Veshe Gele"	Imran	Imran & Puja	5:52
3.	"Moneri Bhaje Bhaje"	Shoquat Ali Imon	Kona & Tasif	4:29
4.	"Mehbooba"	Naved	Tonima & Zaki Ahmad	4:28
5.	"Kistimaat"	Shochi Shams	Shochi Shams	3:32
6.	"Like a Dream"	Imran	Imran & Tahsin	4:26
7.	"Shudhu Ekbar Bolo (Soul Version)"	Naved	Tahsin	3:24
8.	"Mehbooba (NavStep Mix)"	Naved	Tonima & Zaki Ahmad	4:32
9.	"Kistimaat Mashup"	Naved	Various Artists	3:34
10.	"Shopnei Veshe Gele (Zakaria Tahsin Official Remix)"	Naved & Zakaria Tahsin (Remix Producer)	Imran & Puja	6:52
11.	"Mehbooba (House Remix)"	Naved & A.F.R - RV (Remix Producer)	Tonima & Zaki Ahmad	5:00

== See also ==
- Cinema of Bangladesh
