= DJ Rahat =

Bangladeshi DJ

DJ Rahat ডিজে রাহাত
- Born: Rahat Hayat; October 23; Pabna District, Bangladesh
- Genres: House; electro house; big room house
- Occupations: DJ, musician
- Instruments: Keyboards; FL Studio
- Years active: 2004–present
- Labels: Impress Audio Vision Ltd.; Deadline Music; Fahim Music
- Website: djrahat.com

Rahat Hayat (born October 23), better known by his stage name DJ Rahat, is a Bangladeshi DJ. He has opened a school for DJs in Bangladesh.

== Music career ==
In 2007, he featured in the song Bondhu by Nancy. In March 2009, he released Abhimaner Deyal with Julie. He has performed in the 2011 Cricket World Cup and the 2014 ICC World Twenty20. He has released 8 albums featuring other Bangladeshi artists, including Partha Barua, Dilruba Khan, Kumar Biswajit, Nancy, Oyshee, Konal, Fahmida Nobi, Bappa Mazumder, Pantho kanai, Alif Alauddin, Muhin, Baul Shafi Mondol, Shuvo, Onita, Liton, Mukta, Lemis, Nishita Barua, Kona, Uptown Lokolz, and Bangla Mental. In June 2017, he released a single with Tanjib Sarowar.

== Discography ==
- Lampor Alo (2006)
- Asar Srabon (2007)
- After 190 Days (2008)
- Flashback (2009)
- All Time (2012)
- Guru Go (2014)
- DJ Rahat with Stars (2016)
- DJ Rahat Hits (2016)
- DJ Rahat feat Oyshee (Mise Gecho) (2017)
- DJ Rahat Hits

=== Lamper Alo (2006) ===
Song name	Composer	Singer
Intro	DJ Rahat	Tuntun Baul
Opar Hoiya	DJ Rahat	Tuntun Baul
Tora K Jasre	DJ Rahat	Tuntun Baul
Maya	DJ Rahat	Tuntun Baul
Sadher Piyari	DJ Rahat	Tuntun Baul
Lamper Alo	DJ Rahat	Tuntun Baul
Manonio Speaker	DJ Rahat	Tuntun Baul
Tin Pagol	DJ Rahat	Tuntun Baul
Amay Kadale	DJ Rahat	Tuntun Baul
Kaka	DJ Rahat	Tuntun Baul

=== Ashar Shraban (2007) ===
Song name	Composer	Singer
Ashar Shraban	DJ Rahat	Manishi Sadhu
Valobashar Nid Mohol	DJ Rahat	Fahmida Nabi
Aaj Tumi Ney	DJ Rahat	Opu
Akash Meghe Dhaka	DJ Rahat	Santona
Vengese Pinjor	DJ Rahat	Rajib
Banshi Sune Aar Kaaj Ney	DJ Rahat	Partha Barua
Dil Ki Doya	DJ Rahat	Jewel
Nirjon O Jamunar Kule	DJ Rahat	Kona

=== After 190 Days (2008) ===
Song name	Composer	Singer
Bristi Hobe	DJ Rahat	Fahmida Nabi
Chokh Sol Sol Kore	DJ Rahat	Rumon
Deshi Brist	DJ Rahat	
Shotto	DJ Rahat	Shahan
Jantrik	DJ Rahat	
Eti Uti	DJ Rahat	Shuvo
Janeman	DJ Rahat	Alif Alauddin
Kande Sudhu Monন	DJ Rahat	Liton
Miss Kori	DJ Rahat	Alif Alauddin
O Polash, O Shimul	DJ Rahat	Ishita

=== FlashBack - BD Cinema and Rhythm (2009) ===
Song name	Composer	Singer
Ai Mon Tomake Dilam	DJ Rahat	Nishita
Ami Jare Bashi Valo	DJ Rahat	Sumi
Bristi Veja Raat	DJ Rahat	Anita
Chupi Chupi Bolo Kew	DJ Rahat	Nirjhor, Sabbir
Akta Gaan Likho	DJ Rahat	Nirjhor
Nagin Theme	DJ Rahat	
Uhh Ahh	DJ Rahat	Hema

=== Guru Go (2014) ===
Song name	Composer	Singer
Aami Opar Hoye	DJ Rahat	Baul Shafi Mandal
Kanar Haat Bazar	DJ Rahat	Baul Shafi Mandal
Dil Ki Doa	DJ Rahat	Baul Shafi Mandal
Korimona	DJ Rahat	Baul Shafi Mandal
Amay Vashailire	DJ Rahat	Baul Shafi Mandal
Krishno	DJ Rahat	Baul Shafi Mandal
Milon Hobe Koto Dine	DJ Rahat	Baul Shafi Mandal
Khepare	DJ Rahat	Baul Shafi Mandal
Tin Pagol	DJ Rahat	Baul Shafi Mandal
Aage Ki Sundor	DJ Rahat	Baul Shafi Mandal
Sadher Lau	DJ Rahat	Baul Shafi Mandal

=== DJ Rahat Hits (2016) ===
Song name	Composer	Singer
Sona Bondhu	DJ Rahat	Shithi
Dur Bahudur	DJ Rahat	Rauma Rahman
Sara Daw Na	DJ Rahat	Kanij Suborna
Delhi to Dhaka	DJ Rahat	Naju Akhand
Pagol Mon	DJ Rahat	Dilruba Khan
Vromor	DJ Rahat	Dilruba Khan
Rongdhonu	DJ Rahat	Bappa Majumder
Paye Paye	DJ Rahat	Partha Barua
Janiye Dilam	DJ Rahat	Laboni
Ashle Na	DJ Rahat	D Rockstar Shuvo

=== DJ Rahat With Stars (2016) ===
Song name	Composer	Singer
Bondhu	DJ Rahat	Nanchy
Chander Kona	DJ Rahat	Kona
Ovimaner Deyal	DJ Rahat	Juli
Cholo Bohudur	DJ Rahat	Konal
Valobasha Daw	DJ Rahat	Oyshee

=== Mishe Geso (2017) ===
Song name	Composer	Singer
Mishe Geso	DJ Rahat	Oyshee
Shopno Vebe	DJ Rahat	Oyshee
Maya Nai	DJ Rahat	Oyshee
