= Shams Sumon =

Bangladeshi actor (1967–2026)

- শামস সুমন
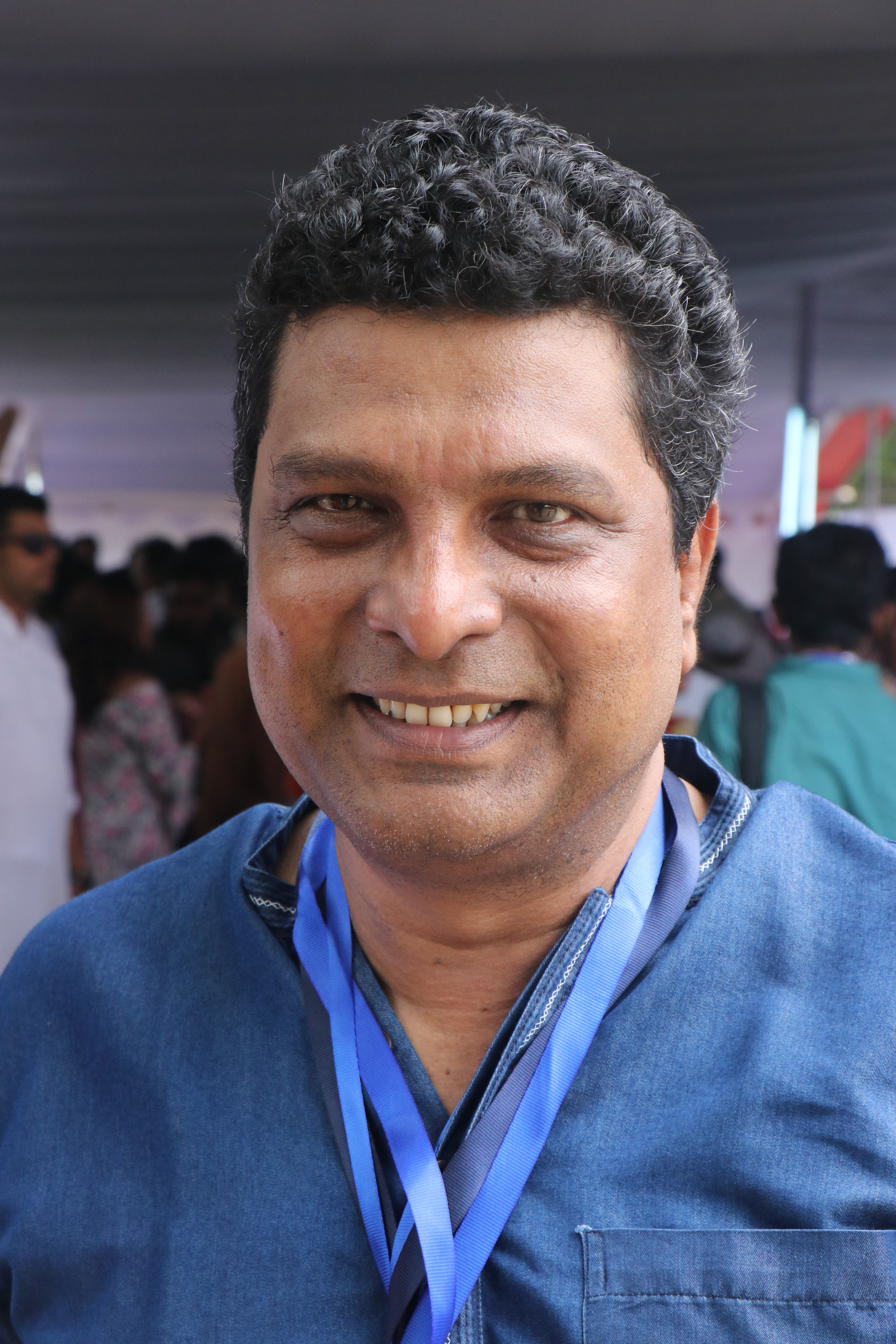
- Sumon, 2019
- Born: 2 March 1967; Rajshahi, East Pakistan, Pakistan
- Died: 17 March 2026 (aged 59); Dhaka, Bangladesh
- Other name: Shams Ibn Obaid
- Education: M Com, Marketing Department, Rajshahi University
- Occupation: Actor
- Years active: 1997–2023
- Website: shamsibneobaid.com

Shams Sumon (2 March 1967 – 17 March 2026) was a Bangladeshi actor. He won the Bangladesh National Film Award for Best Supporting Actor for the film Sopnopuron.

== Early life ==
Sumon was born in Rajshahi on 2 March 1967. He completed his graduation and post-graduation from Rajshahi University.

== Death ==
Sumon died from a heart attack in Dhaka, on 17 March 2026, at the age of 59.

== Works ==
- Swami Keno Asami Voice over Bengali dubbing Chunkey Pandey(1996)
- Meyera Manush Voice over Bengali Dubbing Chunkey Pandey(1997)
- Besh Korichi Prem Korichi Voice over Bengali Dubbing Chunkey Pandey(2003)
- Joyjatra (2004)
- Sopnopuron (2007)
- Black War: Mission Extreme 2 (2023)
