= Assistant commissioner (Bangladesh) =

Assistant Commissioner in Bangladesh is the entry level Grade-9 post in field administration of the Bangladesh Administrative Service. The equivalent rank in the Bangladesh Police Service is Probationary Assistant Superintendent of Police. Assistant Commissioner is also the entry level Grade-9 post in the Bangladesh Revenue Service (Customs, Excise & VAT/Taxation) Cadre, although the post of Assistant Commissioner of Police in Metropolitan Police Commissionerates is typically held by Grade-6 Officers of the rank of Assistant Superintendent of Police with higher experience in the Bangladesh Police Service. Broadly the post of Assistant Commissioner exists in Bangladesh Police Service, Bangladesh Administrative Service and Bangladesh Revenue Service of the Bangladesh Civil Service. To join as an Assistant Commissioner, a person has to pass three phases of the Bangladesh Civil Service exam, and get recommendation from the Bangladesh Public Service Commission, a Quasi-Judicial Constitutional body of Bangladesh. An Assistant Commissioner of the administration also acts as an Executive Magistrate and can exercise vast executive and limited judicial power in their respective jurisdiction. After Completion of 5 years in the field administration, they are relieved from field attachment and are transferred to the central secretariat after which they are promoted to the rank of Senior Assistant Secretary (Grade-6) in their 6th year in the administrative service. Promoted Officers of the rank of Senior Assistant Secretary are then appointed as Sub-district Executive Officer or Senior Assistant Commissioner in the field administration.
