= Ashiqur Rahman (director) =

Bangladeshi filmmaker

- আশিকুর রহমান
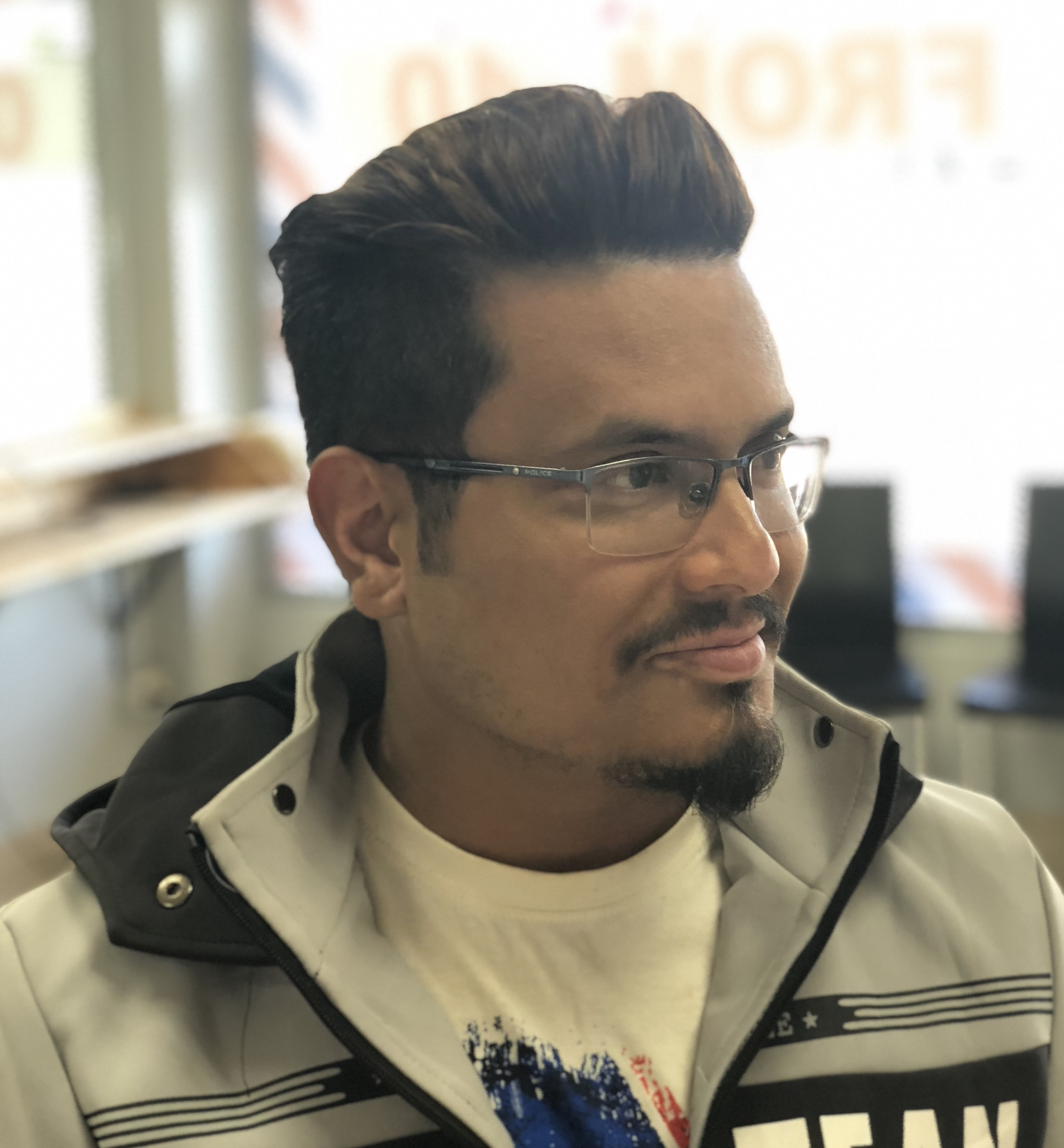
- Education: Bangladesh University of Engineering and Technology; University of Dhaka; University of Technology Sydney
- Occupations: Director & Civil Engineer.
- Years active: 2011–present
- Known for: Directing action films
- Notable work: • Kistimaat • Musafir • Super Hero

Ashiqur Rahman is a Bangladeshi television director, film maker, and screenwriter. He has directed five action films: Kistimaat, Gangster Returns, Musafir, Operation Agneepath and Super Hero . He wrote all except Kistimaat.

== Early life ==
Ashiqur Rahman was born in Dhaka. He completed his Bachelor in Civil Engineering from Bangladesh University of Engineering and Technology (BUET). Later Ashiqur Rahman graduated from University of Technology Sydney in Master of Civil and Environmental Engineering. He also completed Master in Television & Film Studies from the University of Dhaka.

Ashiqur Rahman is member of BFDC Cinematographers Association and Member of BFDC Film Directors Association. He is also a member of Australian Director Guild and Engineers Australia.

== Career ==
In April 2013, Rahman began shooting for TV a script he coauthored with Shimon Mahmud. The action story drama serial, tentatively titled Gangster, starred Ziaul Faruq Apurba, was being produced by Intract Film and Media, and was planned to be broadcast on satellite channel Asian TV. When Asian TV saw clips of the first phase of shooting, they suggested it be made as a movie instead, produced jointly by Asian TV and Saiful Azim. By November, the project was retitled Gangster Returns.

Meanwhile, Rahman began shooting action film Kistimaat, which was released in 2014. Gangster Returns eventually released on 27 November 2015.

Rahman's third film, which he also wrote, is action thriller Musafir. It released on 22 April 2016, and was well received by audiences. Fahmim Ferdous of The Daily Star praised the attempt to tell an original story, the dialog, and cinematography, but found that some scenes were unnecessary, and the plot didn't entirely hold together. He wrote, "Ashiqur Rahman has shown promise, and one can only hope he gets better." The Rahman-directed short musical film Sarangshe Tumi also premiered in April. After four years away from TV production, Rahman directed the action drama Princess for Asian TV. Late in 2016, he was filming Operation Agneepath.

== Filmography ==
- Kistimaat (2014) – as director
- Gangster Returns (2015) – as director and screenwriter
- Musafir (2016) – as director and screenwriter
- Sarangshey Tumi- First Bangladeshi Musical Short Film (2016) – as director
- Operation Agneepath (not yet released) – as director and screenwriter
- Super Hero (2018) - as director and screenwriter

Career in documentary making

- Upokul- Documentary on Bangladesh Coast Guard (2016 & 2018) – as director
- Operation Safe Guard-Bangladesh Navy (2016) – as a Cinematographer
- SWAT in Action by SWAT Bangladesh Police (2017) – as director

Career in music video production

- Boltey Boltey Choltey Choltey (2014) – as director
- Hridoyer Ayna (2016) – as director
- Resmi Churi by Kona (2016) – as director & Cinematographer
