= Imran Mahmudul discography =

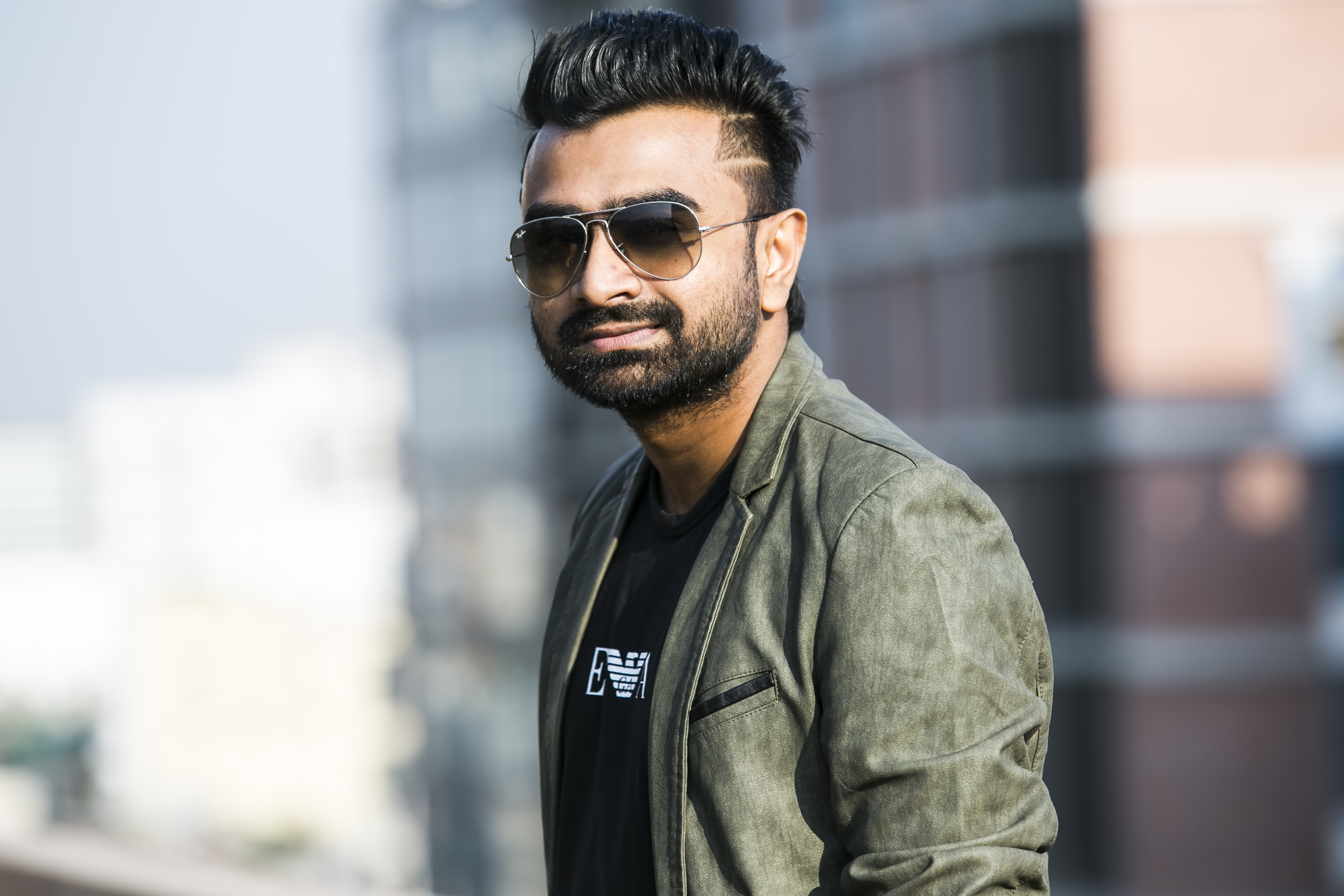
- Studio albums: See below
- Soundtrack albums: See below
- Singles: See below

Imran Mahmudul is a Bangladeshi singer and composer. The following is a list of the songs recorded by Imran Mahmudul.

== Studio albums ==
=== Solo albums ===
==== Shopnoloke (2011) ====
Shopnoloke

Studio album by Imran Mahmudul
- Released: 2011 (CD); 11 March 2016 (Digital streaming)
- Genre: World
- Language: Bengali
- Label: Laser Vision
- Producer: Arfin Rumey; Imran Mahmudul; Mahmud Sunny

All lyrics are written by Jessica Afrin, Anurup Auch, Robiul Islam Jibon, Alif Ahsan Bipu, Faysal, Zahid Akbar; all music is composed by Arfin Rumey, Imran Mahmudul & Mahmud Sunny.

No.	Title	Length
1.	"Acho Kothay"	5:30
2.	"Ayna"	4:26
3.	"Dotana"	4:47
4.	"Hridoyer Gohine" (with Porshi)	5:00
5.	"Manobi"	4:45
6.	"Mon"	5:14
7.	"Mon" (Instrumental)	5:43
8.	"Rangila Mon" (with Sabina Yasmin)	3:50
9.	"Shopnoloke"	3:32
10.	"Shupriyo Bangladesh" (with Nijhu)	5:33

==== Tumi (2014) ====
Tumi

Studio album by Imran Mahmudul
- Released: January 14, 2014
- Genre: World; Pop
- Length: 57:00
- Language: Bengali
- Label: CD Choice; Qinetic Music
- Producer: Imran Mahmudul

All lyrics are written by Robiul Islam Jibon, Zahid Akbar, Sheikh Sumon Emdad, Rifat; all music is composed by Imran Mahmudul.

No.	Title	Length
1.	"A Jibon" (featuring Puja)	5:03
2.	"Akash Dekhina"	5:01
3.	"Akto Kache Asho"	4:22
4.	"Dibanishi"	6:31
5.	"Ki Kore Tomay Bojhay" (featuring Naumi)	4:51
6.	"Ki Kore Tomay Bojhay" (Solo)	4:51
7.	"Manena Mon" (featuring Puja)	4:12
8.	"Manena Mon" (Solo)	4:11
9.	"Pakhir Dana" (featuring Nancy)	5:29
10.	"Shesh Shuchona"	6:12
11.	"Tumi Chara" (featuring Milon & Puja)	6:23
Total length:		57:00

==== Tumi Hina (2014) ====
Tumi Hina

Studio album by Imran Mahmudul
- Released: October 14, 2014
- Genre: World
- Language: Bengali
- Label: CD Choice
- Producer: Imran Mahmudul

All music is composed by Imran Mahmudul.

No.	Title	Length
1.	"Anmona" (featuring Naumi)	4:58
2.	"Baluchor" (featuring Nancy)	4:40
3.	"Boishakhi Rong" (with Milon)	5:09
4.	"Chokher Nile" (featuring Puja)	5:14
5.	"Hridoyer Patay" (featuring Radit)	4:36
6.	"Jonom Jonom" (featuring Arnik)	6:23
7.	"Kach Eshe" (featuring Purnota)	5:41
8.	"Ki Jadu" (featuring Puja)	4:54
9.	"Obak Prem" (featuring Nancy)	6:35
10.	"Shekol"	4:51
11.	"Shopno Majhe" (featuring Naumi)	5:47
Total length:		57:00

==== Bolte Bolte Cholte Cholte (2015) ====
Bolte Bolte Cholte Cholte

Studio album by Imran Mahmudul
- Released: July 14, 2014
- Genre: World
- Length: 1:04:00
- Language: Bengali
- Label: Sangeeta
- Producer: Imran Mahmudul

All lyrics are written by Robiul Islam Jibon, GM Bulbul & Shafiq Tuhin; all music is composed by Imran Mahmudul.

No.	Title	Length
1.	"Bolte Bolte Cholte Cholte"	3:52
2.	"Fire Ashona"	4:40
3.	"Bolbo Toke Aaj" (featuring Puja)	4:39
4.	"Tumi Je Moner Moynare"	4:01
5.	"Ami Nei Amate" (featuring Bristy)	5:04
6.	"Tui To Dekhishna"	4:53
7.	"Borsha Chokh"	4:20
8.	"Drishtir Alapon" (featuring Nishi)	5:00
9.	"Duti Chokhe Jhorche Jol"	3:38
10.	"Hridoye Tui Sharakhon"	4:06
11.	"Khelaghor"	5:45
12.	"Ojhor Srabon"	4:16
13.	"Toke Bhabchi"	3:45
14.	"Bolbo Toke Aaj"	4:39
15.	"Bolte Bolte (Instrumental Version)"	1:54
Total length:		1:04:00

=== Collaborative albums ===
==== Milon (with Milon) (2014) ====
Milon

Studio album by Imran Mahmudul & Milon
- Released: August 4, 2014
- Genre: World
- Language: Bengali
- Label: CD Choice
- Producer: Imran Mahmudul

All music is composed by Imran Mahmudul.

No.	Title	Singer(s)	Length
1.	"Ektu Ektu"	Milon & Naumi	4:42
2.	"Ektu Ektu" (Solo)	Milon	4:40
3.	"Joto Dekhi Tomake"	Milon & Puja	4:47
4.	"Mone Naigo"	Milon	6:56
5.	"Shara Daona"	Milon	4:43
6.	"Ya Khuda"	Milon	5:34

==== Premkabbo (with Shafiq Tuhin and Belal Khan) (2015) ====
Premkabbo

Studio album by Imran Mahmudul, Shafiq Tuhin & Belal Khan
- Released: September 21, 2015
- Genre: World
- Length: 36:00
- Language: Bengali
- Label: Eagle Music
- Producer: Imran Mahmudul; Shafiq Tuhin; Belal Khan

All music is composed by Imran Mahmudul, Shafiq Tuhin & Belal Khan.

No.	Title	Singer	Length
1.	"Bhalobasi"	Shafiq Tuhin	4:19
2.	"Chokher Majhe"	Belal Khan	4:59
3.	"Oviman"	Imran Mahmudul	5:19
4.	"Pagol"	Imran Mahmudul	3:59
5.	"Robi Thakurer Gaan"	Shafiq Tuhin & Nodi	4:55
6.	"Sudhu Tumi"	Imran Mahmudul & Puja	4:45
7.	"Torei Majhe"	Belal Khan & Jhilik	4:15
8.	"Tumi Nei Bhable"	Shafiq Tuhin	3:59

==== Mon Karigor (with Tahsan) (2016) ====
Mon Karigor

Studio album by Imran Mahmudul & Tahsan
- Released: March 18, 2016
- Genre: World
- Length: 26:30
- Language: Bengali
- Label: CD Choice
- Producer: Imran Mahmudul; Tahsan

All music is composed by Imran Mahmudul & Tahsan.

No.	Title	Singer	Length
1.	"Bolo Kobe Dekha Hobe"	Imran Mahmudul	4:06
2.	"Dhrubotara"	Tahsan	3:51
3.	"Keo Ma Januk"	Tahsan	5:50
4.	"Mon Karigor"	Tahsan	4:40
5.	"Nishi Raate Chander Alo"	Imran Mahmudul	4:27
6.	"Shono Tumi"	Imran Mahmudul	4:14

==== Aaj Bhalobashona (with Kona and Bristy) (2016) ====
Aaj Bhalobashona

Studio album by Imran Mahmudul, Kona & Bristy
- Released: June 20, 2016
- Genre: World
- Language: Bengali
- Label: Sangeeta
- Producer: Imran Mahmudul

All music is composed by Imran Mahmudul.

No.	Title	Singer(s)	Length
1.	"Aaj Bhalobashona"	Imran Mahmudul & Bristy	5:12
2.	"Bangladesh"	Imran Mahmudul & Band	3:18
3.	"Bhalobashar Murshid"	Imran Mahmudul	5:36
4.	"Bolo Shathiya"	Imran Mahmudul & Bristy	6:05
5.	"Etota Bhalobashi"	Imran Mahmudul	4:14
6.	"Lage Boro Oshohay" (Duet)	Imran Mahmudul & Kona	3:06
7.	"Lage Boro Oshohay" (Solo)	Kona	3:06

==== Adhek Tumi (with Bappa Mazumder) (2016) ====
Adhek Tumi

Studio album by Imran Mahmudul & Bappa Mazumder
- Released: June 26, 2016
- Genre: World
- Language: Bengali
- Label: CMV
- Producer: Nazir Mahmud; Suman Kalyan

All music is composed by Nazir Mahmud & Suman Kalyan.

No.	Title	Singer	Length
1.	"Mon Kharaper Deshe"	Imran Mahmudul	5:22
2.	"Hawa Tomar"	Bappa Mazumder	5:26
3.	"Shondha Tara"	Imran Mahmudul	4:02
4.	"Adhek Tumi"	Bappa Mazumder	4:26
5.	"Ek Chilte"	Imran Mahmudul	4:26
6.	"Falguni Phul"	Bappa Mazumder	4:57

== EPs ==
=== Bahudore (2016) ===
Bahudore

EP by Imran Mahmudul
- Released: April 14, 2016
- Genre: World
- Language: Bengali
- Label: Eagle Music
- Producer: Imran Mahmudul

All lyrics are written by Faisal Rabbikin; all music is composed by Imran Mahmudul.

No.	Title	Length
1.	"Bahudore"	4:57
2.	"Ekoi Pothe Cholnare" (featuring Sheniz)	3:54
3.	"Tor Ek Isharai"	5:11

=== Nancy with Stars (with Nancy) (2016) ===
Nancy with Stars

EP by Imran Mahmudul & Nancy
- Released: September 16, 2016
- Genre: World
- Language: Bengali
- Label: CD Choice
- Producer: Imran Mahmudul

All music is composed by Imran Mahmudul.

No.	Title	Length
1.	"Bhalo Achi Bhalobeshe Tomai"	4:29
2.	"Bhalobashi Okarone" (featuring Minar)	4:32
3.	"Eki Maya" (featuring Bappa Mazumder)	3:41
4.	"Tomay Proyojon" (Kumar Bishwajit)	4:33

=== Roop (2017) ===
Roop

EP by Imran Mahmudul
- Released: June 10, 2017
- Genre: World
- Language: Bengali
- Label: Tiger Media
- Producer: Mahamud Hayet Arpon

All music is composed by Mahamud Hayet Arpon.

No.	Title	Singer	Length
1.	"Cholna Aaj"	Arpon	4:20
2.	"Cholna Aaj"	Imran Mahmudul	3:54

== Singles ==
Year	Song	Label	Notes	Ref(s)
2012	"Dure Dure" (with Puja)			
2015	"Maa"			
2015	"Tumi Chokh Mele Takale" (with Oyshee)			
2016	"Ekattorer Maa Jononi"			
2016	"Boishakhi Rong" (with Milon)	CD Choice	From the album Tumi Hina and Boishakhi Bajna	
2016	"Boishakhi Dhol" (with Kona)	CD Choice	From the album Boishakhi Bajna	
2016	"Bhinno"	Gaanchill Music		
2016	"Priya Re"	Eagle Music		
2016	"Life In A Metro"	Cloud 7		
2016	"Onek Shadhonar Pore" (with Nancy)	Jaaz Multimedia	From the soundtrack of Niyoti	
2016	"Shobai Chole Jabe" (with Palak Muchhal)	Soundtek	From the album Aamar Ichchhe Kothai	
2016	"Bole Dao" (with Porshi)	CD Choice	From the soundtrack of Sultana Bibiana	
2016	"Priya Re"	Eagle Music		
2016	"Bolona Ekbar" (with Nancy)	Soundtek		
2016	"Tui Chole Jabi"	Gaanchill Music		
2016	"Joy Hobei Hobe" (with Porshi)			
2016	"Alo Chaya" (with Tahsin)	CD Choice		
2017	"Lakho Shopon" (with Nadia)	Eagle Music		
2017	"Dhoa" (Fuad featuring Imran)	Dhruba Music Station		
2017	"Hridoydani"	CD Choice		
2017	"Mon Kharaper Deshe"	CMV Music	From the album Adhek Tumi	
2017	"The Cricket Bangladesh" (with Oyshee)	CD Choice		
2017	"Beyara DJ AKS (Remix)" (Joy Shariar featuring Imran)	Aajob Records		
2017	"Thik Bethik" (with Nancy)	CD Choice		
2017	"Ghorir Kata" (Joy Shariar featuring Imran)	Contel		
2017	"Borosha"	G-Series		
2017	"Priyo Oviman"	CD Choice		
2017	"Aamar Ichchhe Kothai"	CD Choice	From the album Aamar Ichchhe Kothai	
2026	"Tauba Ishq Tera"	T-Series Bangla		

== Film soundtracks ==
=== As composer ===
Year	Film	Song	Singer(s)	Notes	Ref(s)
2014	Kistimaat	"Shopnei Veshe Gele"	Imran & Puja		
2014	Kistimaat	"Like a Dream"	Imran & Tahsin		
2015	The Story of Samara	All Songs	Various Artists		
2016	Musafir	"Alto Choyate"	Imran		
2016	Samraat: The King Is Here	"Raatbhor (Romantic Track)"	Imran		
2016	Samraat: The King Is Here	"Raatbhor (Sad Instrumental)"			
2016	Bossgiri	"Kono Mane Nei To"	Nancy		
2016	Sultana Bibiana	"Bole Dao"	Porshi		
2017	Dhat Teri Ki	"Jane Ei Mon Jane"	Imran		
2017	Thikana	"Drubotara"	Tahsan	Natok	
2026	Prince: Once Upon a Time in Dhaka	"Pori"	Imran and Konal		
2026	Rakkhosh	"Shuddhotar Prem"	Imran and Konal		
2026	Rakkhosh	"Tumi Chara"	Imran and Dola		
2026	Rakkhosh	"Tumi Chara (reprised version)"	Humayra		
2026	Rakkhosh	"Tumi Amar"	Dola		

=== As singer ===
Year	Film	Song	Composer	Notes	Ref(s)
2008	Bhalobasar Lal Golap	"Megh Jekhane" (with Sabina Yasmin)			
2012	Tumi Sondharo Meghmala	"Romeo Juliet" (with Kona)	Habib Wahid		
2012	Jibone Tumi Morone Tumi	"Chokhe Chokhe Eki Holo" (with Konal)	Zabed Ahmed Kislu		
2014	Kistimaat	"Shopnei Veshe Gele"(with Puja)	Imran		
2014	Kistimaat	"Like a Dream" (with Tahsin)	Imran		
2015	The Story of Samara	"Dhiki Dhiki" (with Porshi)	Imran		
2015	Love Marriage	"Toke Onek Bhalobashi" (with Mimi)			
2015	Rajababu: The Power	"Bhalobashi"			
2015	Aro Bhalobashbo Tomay	"Ontorer Moyna" (with Lemis)			
2015	Chheleti Abol Tabol Meyeti Pagol Pagol	"Chik Chik Kore" (with Kona)			
2015	Game	"Baluchor" (with Nancy)			
2015	Miss Butterfly	"Kya Yahi Pyar Hai" (with Mahalakshmi Iyer)	Pritam Banerjee	Indian Film Debut into Indian Film Industry	
2015	Chhuye Dile Mon	"Shunno Theke Ase Prem (Duet)" (with Kona)	Tahsan		
2016	Musafir	"Alto Choyate"	Imran		
2016	Samraat: The King Is Here	"Raatbhor (Romantic Track)"	Imran		
2016	Niyoti	"Onek Sadhonar Pore" (with Nancy)	Savvy	Indo-Bangladeshi Film Recreation of "Onek Sadhonar Pore" from Bhalobashi Tomake	
2016	Bossgiri	"Kono Mane Nei To" (with Nancy)	Imran		
2016	Bossgiri	"Dil Dil Dil" (with Kona)	Sawkat Ali Emon		
2016	Shooter	"Ki Kore Aaj Bolbo" (with Porshi)	Javed Ahmed Kislu		
2016	Dhumketu	"Chupi Chupi Mon Preme Poreche"(with Kheya)			
2017	Swapno Bari	"Hridoydani"	Sajid Sarkar		
2017	Premi O Premi	"Sajna"	Akassh		
2017	Nilima	"Nilima"	Ahmed Humayun		
2017	Tui Amar	"Tui Amar" (with Mayuri)	Shree Pritam		
2017	Dhat Teri Ki	"Jane Ei Mon Jane"	Imran		
2017	Dhat Teri Ki	"Rongila Rongila" (with Kona)	Shawkat Ali Emon		
2017	Koto Swapno Koto Asha	"Cheyechi Chotto Nodi" (with Konal)			
2017	Missed Call	"Shudhu Tomake Chai" (with Porshi)	Imran		
2017	Sultana Bibiana	"Bole Dao" (with Porshi)	Imran		
2017	Dulabhai Zindabad	"Mon Jane" (with Kona)			
2017	Apon Manush	"Surjo Ki Hoy Kiron Chara" (with Nancy)			
2017	Mon Sudhu Toke Chai	"Bolbo Toke Ki Kore" (with Ayush)	Sree Pritam		
2017	Bisorjon	"Valobeshe Mon Ki Pelo"	Milon	Short Film	
2017	Roop	"Cholna Aaj"	Mahamud Hayet Arpon	Short Film	
2018	Super Hero	"Ek Poloke" (with Kona)			
2018	Bhalo Theko	"Mon Deewana"			
2018	Nayok	"Elomelo" (with Kona)			
2018	Asmani	"Sona Bondhure"			
2019	Daag Hridoye	"Hridoye Atodin" (with Oyshee)			
2019	Beporowa	"Tumi Bolle"			
2019	Abbas	"Ei Chokhe Chokh"(with Kona)			
2019	Shapludu	"Mawla"			
2020	Bir	"Tumi Amar Jibon" (with Konal)			
2020	Hridoy Jurey	"Hridoy Jurey (Title Track)" (with Brishty)			
2020	Shahenshah	"Premer Raja"(with Kona)			
2020	Shahenshah	"Tui Ami Chol" (with Anisha)			
2020	Bishwoshundori	"Tui Ki Amar Hobi Re" (with Kona)			
2020	Nabab LLB	"Believe Me" (with Konal)			
2021	Makeup	"Ekta Kotha"			
2022	Bidrohi	"Bhabini Kokhono Ebhabe"			
2022	Golui	"Aay Brishti Jhepe" (with Kona)			
2022	Shaan	"Tor Moto Amake" (with Kona)			
2022	Mukhosh	"O Mon" (with Kona)			
2022	Din–The Day	"Toke Rakhbo Khube Adore" (with Anisha)			
2022	Talash	"Kolpona Te Tor" (with Kona)			
2022	Psycho	"Tor Jonno Koto Maya Re" (with Kona)			
2022	Psycho	"Eta Bhalobasha Noy Beshi Kichu"			
2022	Birotto	"Bhalobashi Bola Hoye Jay" (with Puja)			
2022	Operation Sundarbans	"Tar Hawate" (with Kona)			
2022	Boshonto Bikel	"Ei Poth Jodi Shesh Hoy" (with Shithi Saha)			
2022	Damal	"Mon Posh Mane Na" (with Kona)			
2023	Adventure of Sundarbans	"Tui Ki Amay Bhalobashis"			
2023	Paap	"Habu Dubu" (with Kona)			
2023	Jinn	"Dhongi" (with Kona)			
2023	Leader: Amie Bangladesh	"Surma Surma" (with Konal)			
2023	Prohelika	"Megher Nouka" (with Konal)			
2023	Chhaya Brikkho	"Lo Soi Tuli Tuli" (with Konal)			
2023	Danger Zone	"Hridoye Tui Onuvobe Tui"			
2023	Firey Dekha	"Pakhi" (with Kona)			
2023	Casino	"Ishara" (with Nancy)			
2024	Lipstick	"Nindukey" (with Nancy)			
2024	Dard	"Ek Prem"			
2025	Borbaad	"Mayabi" (with Konal)			
2025	Jongli	"Bondhugo Shono"(with Kona)			
2025	Jinn 3	"Konna" (with Kona)			
2026	Prince: Once Upon a Time in Dhaka	"Pori" (with Konal)			
2026	Rakkhosh	"Shuddhotar Prem" (with Konal)			
2026	Rakkhosh	"Tumi Chara" (with Dola)			
2026	Domm: Until the Last Breath	"Kothay Pabo Tahare" (with Purnee)			

== Guest appearances ==
Year	Artist	Album	Song	Notes
2012	Amit	Bhalobashi Priya	"Hridoyer Kotha" (with Earnick)	
2012	Amit	Bhalobashi Priya	"Jonome Jonome" (with Earnick)	
2012	Amit Chatterjee	100 Percent Love	"Bhalobashar Nongor" (with Shikriti)	
2012	Kheya	Dure Dure	"Moner Thikana" (with Anika)	
2012	Kheya	Dure Dure	"Tomari Chokhe"	
2012	Kheya	Dure Dure	"Tumi Dure Dure" (with Puja)	
2013	Prottoy Khan	FNF	"Shei Bikel" (with Proma)	
2013	Prottoy Khan	FNF	"Tumi Chara" (with Proma)	
2013	Purnota	Purnota	"Kache Ese"	
2013	Jannat	Jannat Pushpo	"Bhalobeshe Ei Amake"	
2013	Various Artists	Shudhu Bhalobasha	"Ki Jadu" (with Puja)	Compilation album
2014	Various Artists	Jege Otho	"Amra Korbo Joy" (with Ayon & Evan)	Compilation album
2014	Various Artists	Jege Otho	"Jago Bangali Jago" (with Rakib, Shovon, Marshall & Ayon)	Compilation album
2014	Various Artists	Mon Pujari	"Akash Pane" (with Puja)	Compilation album
2014	Puja	Puja	"Abegi Daana"	
2014	Puja	Puja	"Ontohin Bhalobasha"	
2014	Anisa	Ochena Shihoron	"Bhalobasha Emoni"	
2014	Monmi	Shopno Dana	"Shopner Prithibi"	
2014	Zhilik	Prothom Prem	"Beshamal"	
2014	Luftor Hasan	Amay Niye Cholo	"Chokher Nil" (with Puja)	
2014	Anika	Anika Ibnat	"Elomelo"	
2014	Anika	Anika Ibnat	"Tumi Chara Emon"	
2014	Milon	Milon Holo Eto Dine	"Premer Dohai"	
2014	Baby Naznin	The Black Diamond	"Cheyechi Tomake"	
2014	Kishor	Dhulor Gaan	"Shekol"	
2014	Various Artists	Obak Prem	"Obak Prem" (with Nancy)	
2015	Ayon	Hridoy Majhe	"Dola" (with Bidhu)	
2015	Nirjhor	Shopnomukhi	"Bhalobeshe"	Composer
2015	Nirjhor	Shopnomukhi	"Aradhona"	Composer
2015	Nusrat	Bhalobashi Nusrat	"Kotota Bhalobashi"	
2015	Nusrat	Bhalobashi Nusrat	"Noyone Noyone"	
2015	Nusrat	Bhalobashi Nusrat	"Noyone Noyone Sad Version"	
2015	Puja	Puja Returns	"Januk Sara Prithibi"	
2015	Puja	Puja Returns	"Keno Bare Bare"	
2015	Various Artists	Mato Cricket Joware	"Gorje Otho"	Compilation album
2015	Various Artists	Amra Amra	"Bhashi Dubi"	Compilation album
2015	Kazi Shuvo	Amra Amra 2	"Shukher Abrita"	Compilation album
2015	Shafiq Tuhin	Angule Angul	"Ailo Re Boishakh" (with Shafiq Tuhin and Mahmud Jewel)	
2015	Sinthia	Only Sinthia 2	"Bolona"	
2015	Oyshee	Oyshee Express	"Tumi Chokh Mele Takale"	
2015	Oyshee	Oyshee Express	"Janina Janina"	
2015	Oyshee	Oyshee Express	"Ei Fagune"	
2015	Joy Shahriar	Jokhon Icche Tomar	"Beyara"	
2015	Porshi	Porshi 3	"Jonom Jonom"	
2016	Milon	Milon Holo Eto Dine 2	"Bhalobeshe Mon Ki Pelo"	
2016	Puja	Obuj Pakhi	"Bojhena Hiya"	
2016	Kona	Rhythmic Kona	"Kotha Dao Tumi Thakbe Pashe"	
2016	Kona	Rhythmic Kona	"Ke Koto Dure"	
2016	Nadia	Nadia	"Lakho Shopon"	
2016	Various Artists	Kheyal Poka	"Bhishon Bhabe"	Compilation album
2016	Various Artists	Ek Prithibi Prem	"Ek Prithibi Prem" (with Nancy)	Compilation album
2016	Various Artists	The Hit Album 5	"Toke Chara" (with Zhilik)	Compilation album
2016	Various Artists	Amra Amra 3	"Tumi Kore Bolte Pari" (with Nancy)	Compilation album
2017	Nishi	Prem Elei Emon Hoy	"Prem Elei Emon Hoy"	
2017	Milon & Nancy	Jotone	"Muthoy Bhora Shopno" (with Nancy)	
2017	Torik	Jochonar Borshone	"Guchiye Rakho Shobdomala"	
2017	Various Artists	Gaaner Kanon	"Poloke Poloke" (with Puja)	Compilation album
2017	Various Artists	Love Duets 2	"Jodi Haat Ta Dhoro" (with Bristy)	Compilation album
2017	Various Artists	Boishakher Bajna	"Boishakhi Dhol" (with Kona)	Compilation album
2017	Various Artists	Boishakher Bajna	"Boishakhi Rong" (with Milon)	Compilation album
