= 25th Meril-Prothom Alo Awards =

2024 Bangladeshi TV and film awards

- Awarded for: Artistic excellence in film, television, music, and digital media
- Awarded by: Prothom Alo; Square Toiletries Ltd.
- Announced on: May 21, 2024 (Critic choice'); May 22, 2024 (Popular choice')
- Date: May 23, 2024
- Site: The Grace Auditorium, United Convention Center, Dhaka
- Hosted by: Hanif Sanket
- Directed by: Kabir Bakul
- Official website: Official website

Highlights
- Best Film: Jury's choice: Aam Kathaler Chhuti
- Best Direction: Mohammad Nuruzzaman; Aam Kathaler Chhuti
- Best Actor: Afran Nisho; Surongo
- Best Actress: Nusrat Imrose Tisha; Something Like an Autobiography
- Lifetime achievement: Masud Ali Khan

Television coverage
- Channel: Maasranga Television

The 25th Meril-Prothom Alo Awards ceremony was held on 24 May 2024 at the United Convention Center in Dhaka, Bangladesh. Organized annually by the leading Bangladeshi newspaper Prothom Alo, in association with Square Toiletries Ltd., the awards are considered one of the most prestigious accolades in the country's entertainment industry. The event celebrates artistic excellence in film, television, music, and digital media, recognizing works from the previous calendar year through popular vote and critics’ selection. The ceremony was hosted by renowned television personality Hanif Sanket, marking his return to the Meril-Prothom Alo Awards after a two-decade hiatus. He had last served as the host of the event in 2005, making the 2024 edition his first appearance as presenter in 19 years.

== List of winners and nominees ==
On 21 May 2024, nominees were announced in the critics' categories for short fiction, web series, and films. On 22 May, nominations were revealed in the popular vote (star poll) categories for music, television, films, and debut performances. The awards were handed out on 24 May 2024. The list below includes both nominees and winners, with winners highlighted in bold.

=== Lifetime Achievement Award ===
- Masud Ali Khan

=== Special honor ===
- Hanif Sanket

=== Star poll ===
Best Male Singer	Best Female Singer
**Imran Mahmudul** – **"Megher Nouka"** (Film: **Prohelika**); Erfan Mridha Shiblu – "Kotha Koiyo Na" (Coke Studio Bangla); Tanjib Sarowar – "Ga Chhuye Bolo" (Film: Surongo); Riyad Hasan – "Ishwar" (Film: Priyotoma)	**Abanti Sithi** – **"Ga Chhuye Bolo"** (Film: **Surongo**); Atia Anisa – "Pure Gelam" (Web film: Punormilone); Konal – "O Priyotoma" (Film: Priyotoma); Jefar Rahman – "Jhumka"
Best Film Actor	Best Film Actress
**Afran Nisho** – **Surongo**; Arifin Shuvoo – Mujib: The Making of a Nation; Shakib Khan – Priyotoma; Siam Ahmed – Antarjal	**Nusrat Imrose Tisha** – **Something Like an Autobiography**; Puja Cherry – Jinn; Bidya Sinha Saha Mim – Antarjal; Shobnom Bubly – Prohelika
Best TV Actor	Best TV Actress
**Afran Nisho** – **Purnojonmo: Antim Porbo**; Ziaul Faruq Apurba – Pothe Holo Deri; Yash Rohan – Je Prem Eshchhilo; Tawsif Mahbub – Ural Pakhi	**Mehazabien Chowdhury** – **Ononna**; Tanjin Tisha – Putuler Songsar; Tanjim Saiyara Totini – Pothe Holo Deri; Tasnia Farin – Kobor
Best Newcomer
Irfan Roni – Sare Solo; Nazneen Niha – Love Semester; Meghla Tupur – Virus; Mostofa Sarwar Farooki – Something Like an Autobiography

=== Critics’ choice ===
Best Film	Best Director (Film & Web Film)
**Mohammad Nuruzzaman** – **Aam Kathaler Chhuti**; Khandaker Sumon – Saatao; Yuvraj Shamim – Adim	**Mohammad Nuruzzaman** – **Aam Kathaler Chhuti**; Nur Imran Mithu – Patalghar; Yuvraj Shamim – Adim
Best Film Actor	Best Film Actress
**Leon Ahmed** – **Aam Kathaler Chhuti**; Nasir Uddin Khan – Friday; Shahiduzzaman Selim – Baba, Someone’s Following Me	**Tasnia Farin** – **Nikosh**; Afsana Mimi – Patalghar; Toma Mirza – Friday
Best Screenwriter (Short Film)	Best Director (Short Film)
**Moumita Hossain** – **Shomoy Shob Jane**; Ahmed Tawkir – Buk Pocket-e Jibon; Mezbaha Uddin Sumon – Priyo Poribar	**Sakib Fahad** – **Shomoy Shob Jane**; Anonno Emon – Buk Pocket-e Jibon; Atik Zaman – Jahan
Best Actor (Short Film)	Best Actress (Short Film)
**Tariq Anam Khan** – **Buk Pocket-e Jibon**; Imtiaz Barshon – Crime and Punishment; Shashwato Dutta – Shomoy Shob Jane	**Tanjim Saiyara Totini** – **Shomoy Shob Jane**; Nazia Haque Orsha – Jahan; Sabila Nur – Moyurpuchcho Kak
Best Web Series	Best Director (Web Series)
**Mohanagar 2 – Sakib R Khan**; Guti – Redoan Rony; Mobaraknama – Sakib R Khan	**Ashfaque Nipun** – **Mohanagar 2**; Rezaur Rahman – Internship; Shankha Dasgupta – Guti
Best Actor (Web Series)	Best Actress (Web Series)
**Mosharraf Karim** – **Mobaraknama**; Nasir Uddin Khan – Myself Allen Swapan; Soumya Jyoti – Internship	**Azmeri Haque Badhon** – **Guti**; Rafiath Rashid Mithila – Myself Allen Swapan; Shahnaz Sumi – Mobaraknama
Best Screenwriter (Web Series)
**Shankha Dasgupta, Robiul Alam Robi, Abu Sayeed Rana** and **Jahin Faruq Amin** – **Guti**; Abdullah Al Muqtadir – Mobaraknama; Ashfaque Nipun – Mohanagar 2
