= Guti (TV series) =

- Poster
- Genre: Crime thriller
- Screenplay by: Shankha Dasgupta; Robiul Alam Robi; Zahin Faruq Amin; Abu Sayeed Rana
- Directed by: Shankha Dasgupta
- Starring: Azmeri Haque Badhon; Nasir Uddin Khan; Shahriar Nazim Joy; Moushumi Hamid
- Composer: Ruslan Rehman
- Country of origin: Bangladesh
- Original language: Bengali
- No. of seasons: 1
- No. of episodes: 7

Production
- Executive producers: Dip Saha; Didarul Islam Shishir
- Producer: Redoan Rony
- Production location: Bangladesh
- Cinematography: Barkat Hossain Polash
- Editor: Saleh Sobhan Auneem
- Production companies: Chorki; A for Action

Original release
- Network: Chorki
- Release: 5 January 2023

Guti is a 2023 Bangladeshi crime thriller web series directed by Shankha Dasgupta and produced by Redoan Rony under the banner of Chorki and A for Action in association with Filmy Features. It stars Azmeri Haque Badhon as the lead character Sultana, alongside Nasir Uddin Khan, Shahriar Nazim Joy, Sharif Siraj, Moushumi Hamid. It was streaming on 5 January 2023 on OTT platform Chorki.

Azmeri Haque Badhon won the 25th Meril-Prothom Alo Awards for Best Actress at the Critics' Choice Awards category for her outstanding performances in the series and Shankha Dasgupta, Robiul Alam Robi, Zahin Faruq Amin and Abu Sayeed Rana won the award for Best Screenplay Writer in the web series category.

== Cast ==
- Azmeri Haque Badhan as Sultana
- Nasir Uddin Khan as Nannu
- Shahriar Nazim Joy as Selim
- Mousumi Hamid as Lipi
- Sharif Siraj as Prodip
- Arya Aritra
- Tuntuni Sobhan
- Arfan Mridha Shiblu
- Mahmudul Alam

== Reception ==
Syed Nazmus Sakib of The Daily Star reviewed for the series. Irfan Aziz of The Daily Star reviewed, the series received widespread audience praise for its engaging storytelling and nuanced exploration of the underground drug trade.

== Accolades ==
Awards	Category	Recipients	Results	Ref.
25th Meril-Prothom Alo Awards	Best Web Series (critics' choice)	Guti	Nominated	
25th Meril-Prothom Alo Awards	Best Director (critics' choice)	Shankha Dasgupta	Nominated	
25th Meril-Prothom Alo Awards	Best Actress (critics' choice)	Azmeri Haque Badhon	Won	
25th Meril-Prothom Alo Awards	Best Screenplay Writer (critics' choice)	Shankha Dasgupta	Won	
25th Meril-Prothom Alo Awards	Best Screenplay Writer (critics' choice)	Robiul Alam Robi	Won	
25th Meril-Prothom Alo Awards	Best Screenplay Writer (critics' choice)	Zahin Faruq Amin	Won	
25th Meril-Prothom Alo Awards	Best Screenplay Writer (critics' choice)	Abu Sayeed Rana	Won	
Blender's Choice–The Daily Star OTT and Digital Content Awards	Best Web Series	Guti	Nominated	
Blender's Choice–The Daily Star OTT and Digital Content Awards	Best Antagonist	Nasir Uddin Khan	Nominated	
Blender's Choice–The Daily Star OTT and Digital Content Awards	Best Supporting Actor (female)	Moushumi Hamid	Nominated	
Blender's Choice–The Daily Star OTT and Digital Content Awards	Best Director	Shankha Dasgupta	Nominated	
Blender's Choice–The Daily Star OTT and Digital Content Awards	Best Actress	Azmeri Haque Badhon	Won	
Blender's Choice–The Daily Star OTT and Digital Content Awards	Best Sound Designer (critics' choice)	Rajesh Saha	Won	
Blender's Choice–The Daily Star OTT and Digital Content Awards	Best Costume Designer (critics' choice)	Bijaya Ratnabali	Won	
