= Leader: Amie Bangladesh =

- Theatrical released poster
- Directed by: Topu Khan
- Screenplay by: Topu Khan; Delwar Hossain Dil
- Story by: Delwar Hossain Dil
- Produced by: Syed Ashik Rahman
- Starring: Shakib Khan; Shobnom Bubly; Misha Sawdagor; Shahiduzzaman Selim
- Cinematography: Chandan Roy Chowdhury
- Edited by: Arifin Sarker
- Music by: Bappa Mazumdar Naved Parvez
- Production company: Bengal Multimedia
- Distributed by: TOT Films; RTV
- Release date: 22 April 2023
- Running time: 144 mins
- Country: Bangladesh

Leader: Amie Bangladesh (Bengali: লিডার: আমিই বাংলাদেশ; Bengali pronunciation: [lidar: ami͡i̯ baŋlad̪eʃ]; transl. Leader: I am Bangladesh) is a 2023 Bangladeshi political action drama film. The film was directed by Topu Khan (in his debut) and produced by Syed Ashik Rahman under the banner of Bengal Multimedia. It revolves around Nafees Iqbal (Shakib Khan), a conscious young man who embarked on a transformative journey to rid society of corruption and the misuse of political power, featuring Shabnom Bubly, Misha Sawdagor, Shahiduzzaman Selim in the lead roles. It is the last film of Shakib Khan and Shabnom Bubly as a Duo.

The film's production began in 2021 with the signing of director Topu Khan with Shakib Khan and Shabnom Bubly, which is their twelfth collaboration.

== Synopsis ==
An area of the city does not have minimum civic amenities. The councilor disappointed the people by promising to fix the bumpy roads. Nafis Iqbal (Shakib Khan), a young man of the area, quits his job and runs a coffee shop in the area. He thinks that the youth will take the country forward, they should do their own work without looking at the government. On the other hand, Mila Chowdhury (Shobnom Bubly), the daughter of a famous doctor of the city, has the opposite nature. She is power hungry.

== Cast ==
- Shakib Khan as Nafees Iqbal
- Shabnom Bubly as Mila Chowdhury
- Misha Sawdagor as Azam Millat
- Shahiduzzaman Selim as Home Minister
- Fakhrul Bashar Masum as Nafees Iqbal's father
- Mili Bashar as Nafees Iqbal's mother
- Maruf Khan as Kamrul Hasan
- Preeti as Rimi, Nafees Iqbal's sister
- Remu Roza Khandokar
- Lutfur Rahman Khan Shimanto as Tony Millat

== Production ==
The production of the film was announced at a press conference at Bengal Multimedia studio in Tejgaon, Dhaka on February 18, 2021. There, the contract was officially signed with director Topu Khan and Shakib Khan and Shabnom Bubly for the lead role, which is their twelfth collaboration as a pair. The principal photography of the film began on May 25, 2021 in Uttara, Dhaka. After eight consecutive days of filming till June 1 at various places in Uttara, a short breaks were given. After that from June 17, the set was made at Bangladesh Film Development Corporation (BFDC) and filming re-started. Later, with a two days break for the set change, the re-filming resumed on June 24. On June 23, 2021, Samakal reported that, in a mail message the film's production company said that 60 percent of its filming was completed. As the global outbreak of Covid-19 has increased in Bangladesh, a nationwide lockdown has been announced and its filming was stopped on June 28. After 45 days, protagonist Shakib Khan took part in the filming from August 11, 2021 as the nationwide lockdown was relaxed. The action sequence of the film was supposed to be with Misha Sawdagor. Its action sequence was scheduled to be filmed in the first week of September, 2021. But, its antagonist actor Misha Shawdagar moved for the United States to take the vaccine for COVID-19. As a result, the work of the sequence was stopped at that time. After receiving the vaccine, he returned home and signed a contract with the film on September 21. The next day on September 22, last lot of filming was started, in this part production work was done for 5 consecutive days till September 25. Where the film's action scenes between Shakib Khan and Misha Shawdagar were completed and other works of the film were completed. Later on the same day on September 25, the film was announced to be completed at Film City in Dhamrai. Then on October 2, the film was wrapped up by filming a song titled "Surma Surma" at a five-star hotel in Dhaka.

== Soundtrack ==
The soundtrack of the film is composed by Bappa Mazumder, Shuvra Raha and Naved Parvez. Habibur Rahman has choreographed all the songs of the film. Its background music is composed by Bappa Mazumder, his third work as background music director. He said about background music, "I enjoy background music very much. I like this work very much in this film." Its title track "Amie Bangladesh" is composed by Bappa Mojumder, which written and sung by himself. He said regarding working in the film, "First of all, I'm more interested in background music. Secondly, I have worked very little in commercial films. That's why I wanted to do this. Here I have a great interest." It is the second collaboration between Khan and Majumdar. Earlier in 2017, they worked together in the Hasibur Reza Kallol's romance tragic Swatta. Two songs composed by him in the film won National Film Awards. He also won the National Film Award as the Best Music Director for the first time. The first song of the film in the rap genre titled "Kotha Ache Kotha Aach" was revealed on RTV Music Plus on April 12, 2023. It is sung Tabib Mahmud, penned by himself and composed by Shuvra Raha. The song deals with corruption, injustice and protest. After its release, it went viral on social media and trended on YouTube. The film's second song titled Surma Surma was revealed on April 21, which is a romantic number. The song is sung by Imran Mahmudul and Somnur Monir Konal, which composed by Naved Parvez and penned by Zahid Akbar. It is the second collaboration between Khan and Akbar. Earlier in 2014, he penned a song titled "Jekhanei Jaabe Amake Pabe" for the Shakib Khan-produced film Hero: The Superstar. It received positive response from the audience and went viral and trending on social media. Its third song titled "Barood" sung by Sajal, which is his second venture with Shakib Khan. Earlier in 2016, they worked together in Raju Chowdhury's Shooter. The song also composed Naved Parvez and penned by Robiul Islam Jibon. On April 22, the film's soundtrack revealed in audio on all the digital streaming platforms. After the film's release, its third song "Barood" was revealed on YouTube on April 26.

Track listing
No.	Title	Lyrics	Music	Singer(s)	Length
1.	"Kotha Ache Kotha Ache"	Tabib Mahmud	Subhra Raha	Tabib Mahmud	2:12
2.	"Surma Surma"	Zahid Akbar	Naved Parvez	Imran Mahmudul, Somnur Monir Konal	3:28
3.	"Barood"	Robiul Islam Jibon	Naved Parvez	Sajal	2:54
4.	"Amie Bangladesh"	Bappa Mozumder	Bappa Mozumder	Bappa Mazumder	3:36
Total length:					12:08 minutes

== Marketing and release ==
The first look of the film was revealed on May 21, 2021, before production began, featuring Shakib Khan as a protester. It was followed by the release of its second look on May 24, where Bubly is seen as the woman leader. On December 26, 2022, the film got censor clarification to release from Bangladesh Film Censor Board without any cuts. After the clearance, its duration stands at 144 minutes. Its official teaser was revealed on RTV Music Plus on the occasion of National Film Day on April 3, 2023. A single dialogue is used in the 51-second teaser. After its release, the teaser received huge appreciation from the audience and critics. The film's trailer was revealed on social media on April 21.

=== Promotion ===
Although, there was no promotion of the film itself. However, its production company Bengal Multimedia and distributor TOT Films have been doing a lot of promotion on social media. As part of the promotion, protagonist Shakib Khan said that he will watch the film in theaters with his parents for the first time. Also on April 23, 2023, a team of this film including Shobnom Bubly watched the film in different theaters of Dhaka. On April 28, a team from the film, including director Topu Khan and actress Shobnom Bubly, visited Kushtia to promote it.

=== Release ===
The film was initially planned to release on the occasion of Eid al-Adha 2022. Later, it was not released due to dubbing and release clarification. In March 2023, the production company Bengal Multimedia announced its release date on Eid al-Fitr 2023. The film was released in 100 cinemas nationwide on 22 April 2023 on the occasion of Eid al-Fitr. The film opened in two more theaters in the second week, taking its total to 102.

== Reception ==
=== Critical response ===
Leader: Amie Bangladesh received positive acclaim from critics and audience. Especially its screenplay arrangement, soundtrack, actors performance are appreciated. Prothom Alo's film analyst and critic Masum Apu mentioned the film as old plyer, new methods. He praised the presentation and delivery of the story, and wrote, "It's a familiar story. However, there is modernity and innovation in the presentation of the story. The costumes, scenes, makeup, sets made me feel, hey, this is a traditional commercial movie of our country! In short, this is the essence of Leader: I am Bangladesh." But he also criticized the story as a hasty and in some places "the impression of over-drama is clear". In a review in Samakal, filmmaker and critic SA Haque Olik gave the film 8 out of 10. He referred to the film as a "fragment of familiar events in life". Film critic and analyst Sherif Al Sayer at Bangla Tribune gave the film 7 out of 10. He referred to the songs of this film as its soul. He also praised Shakib Khan's acting and the film's dialogues. Film critic Rahman Moti gave the film 6/10 on the Bangla Movie Database. He referred to it as a socially conscious film. But he also cited the film's weaknesses in an FDC-centric cliché set. In another review on the Bengali Movie Database, Tirthak Ahsan Russell praised the film's set. He also praised the costumes of the performers. But he also criticized the film "for making the story with many issues". National Film Award-winning director Mostafizur Rahman Manik praised Shakib Khan's performance and also set in the film. He wrote in Kalbela, if you analyze the character and acting, I will say that Shakib Khan has performed brilliantly. He pulled the whole movie on his shoulders.

=== Box office ===
After the release of the film, it received a huge response at the box office. According to various media reports, almost every show of it was housefull on the first day. It was said to be superhit at the box office. The Business Post reported that the film grossed total ৳9.5 crore (equivalent to ৳10 crore or US$860,000 in 2024) at the box office. Although according to the producer, his share was only ৳76 lakhs because of the ambiguity of Bangladeshi box office.
