= Tumi Amar Jibon =

Single by Akassh featuring Imran Mahmudul and Somnur Monir Konal

from the album Bir
- Language: Bengali
- English title: You Are My Life
- Released: 6 February 2020
- Recorded: 2019
- Studio: Sunan Films
- Genre: Soundtrack; Filmi; world
- Length: 4:17
- Label: SK Films; Sunan Films
- Composer: Akassh
- Lyricist: Kabir Bakul
- Producer: Akassh

Bir track listing
- 1. "Tumi Amar Jibon"; 2. "Toke Dekhle Shudhu"; 3. "Miss Bubly"; 4. "Ki Chomthkar"

Music Videos
- "Tumi Amar Jibon" on YouTube

Tumi Amar Jibon also known as "Bhalobashar Manusha Tumi" (Bengali: তুমি আমার জীবন, transl. You Are My Life) is a romantic song from the 2020 political-drama film Bir, sung by Imran Mahmudul and Somnur Monir Konal. The song is composed by Akassh and penned by Kabir Bakul. National-award-winning choreographer Habibur Rahman has choreographed this song. It was revealed on February 6, 2020, on SK Films' YouTube channel as a promotional song for the film. Somnur Monir Konal won the Bangladesh National Film Award as Best Playback Singer jointly with Dilshad Nahar Kona for the song.

== Background ==
The first song from the 2020 political-drama Bir is "Tumi Amar Jibon" sung by Imran Mahmudul and Somnur Monir Konal. Whchi composed by Akassh and penned by Kabir Bakul with choreographed by Habibur Rahman. The title of the song Tumi Amar Jibon is taken from a song of the same title composed by Ahmed Imtiaz Bulbul and sung by Andrew Kishore and Runa Laila from the 1989 film Abujh Hridoy starring Zafar Iqbal and Bobita.

== Song credits ==
The song credits mentioned in the official music video's description of the song Tumi Amar Jibon on YouTube are,

- Akassh – composer
- Kabir Bakul – lyricist
- Imran Mahmudul and Somnur Monir Konal – vocal
- Habibur Rahman – choreographer
- S.M Tushar – Editor
- Akassh – sound design, music arrangement

== Release and response ==
The song was revealed on February 6, 2020 on SK Films' YouTube channel. After its release, the song received massive response from the audience and positive reviews from critics and crossed 13 million views in just three days. As of January 2024, it has over 31 million views on YouTube.

== Reception ==
Events	Date of Events	Category	Nominee	Results	Ref
National Film Awards	23 March 2022	Best Female Singer	Somnur Monir Konal	Won	
