= Taqdeer =

Taqdeer or Taqdir may refer to:

- Taqdir, an Islamic concept relating to the tension between free-will and omnipotence
- Taqdeer (1943 film), an Indian Hindi-language film
- Taqdeer, a 1976 Indian Hindi-language drama film by A. Salaam
- Taqdeer (1983 film), an Indian Hindi-language film by Brij
- Taqdeer, Hindi title of the 2017 Indian Telugu-language film Hello
- Taqdeer (2022 TV series), a Pakistani TV show with Sami Khan
- Taqdeer (2020 TV series), a Bangladeshi web series

== See also ==
- Taqdeerwala, a 1995 Indian fantasy film
