= Mezbah Uddin Sumon =

Bangladeshi screenwriter and playwright

- Born: 24 August 1980 (age 46); Dhaka, Bangladesh
- Education: University of Dhaka (BA in Philosophy)
- Alma mater: University of Dhaka
- Occupations: Screenwriter, playwright
- Writing career
- Period: 2009–present
- Genres: Drama, thriller, social themes
- Notable works: Golam Mamun (2024); Uno Sir (2024); Murder 90s (2023); Gen Z: Tumi Ke Ami Ke? (2024)
- Notable awards: RTV Star Award (2018); CJFB Cultural Journalists Forum Award (2025)

Mezbah Uddin Sumon (Bengali: মেজবাহ উদ্দিন সুমন; born 24 August 1980) is a Bangladeshi screenwriter and playwright known for his work in television dramas, web series and films. His writing frequently focuses on social issues, family relationships and contemporary political themes. He has been associated with a large number of television productions and is regarded as a prominent writer in Bangladesh's television and OTT industries.

== Early life and education ==
Sumon was born in Dhaka, Bangladesh. He completed his schooling in the city before enrolling at the University of Dhaka, where he earned a Bachelor of Arts degree in philosophy. During his student years, he became involved in theatre activities, which contributed to his interest in writing for performance and screen.

== Career ==
Sumon began his professional career in advertising and development communication, working as a copywriter with organisations including BBC Media Action and development-focused projects. In 2009, he shifted his focus to playwriting and television drama.

His television debut came with the drama Acher Meye (2010), directed by Dipankar Dipan. Over the following years, he wrote a large number of television dramas and serials, establishing himself as a regular contributor to Bangladeshi television networks.

He later expanded his work to feature films and OTT platforms. His film credits include Rajniti (2017), while his web and OTT projects include Murder 90s (2023), Golam Mamun (2024), and Uno Sir (2024). Golam Mamun, co-written with Shihab Shaheen, received attention for its thriller narrative and social undertones.

In 2024, Sumon wrote the political drama series Gen Z: Tumi Ke Ami Ke?, inspired by contemporary student movements in Bangladesh. The series was directed by Abu Hayat Mahmud and began production in September 2024.

== Selected works ==
=== Television dramas and series ===
- Acher Meye (2010)
- Bhalobashar Chotushkon (2015)
- Upolobdhi (2018)
- Chantgaiya Golmal (2022)
- Priyo Poribar (2023)
- Murder 90s (2023)
- Gen Z: Tumi Ke Ami Ke? (2024)
- Beshi Bole Bulbuli (2024)
- Uno Sir (2024)

=== Films and web series ===
- Monsuba Junction (2012)
- Rajniti (2017)
- Bhaiya (2019)
- Nikosh (2024)
- Golam Mamun (2024)
- Prince: Once Upon a Time in Dhaka (2026)

== Awards and nominations ==
- RTV Star Award for Best Writer (2018)
- CJFB Cultural Journalists Forum Award (2025), for Golam Mamun
