= Syndicate (TV series) =

Bangladeshi drama streaming television series

- Genre: Crime; Thriller
- Written by: Shihab Shaheen
- Directed by: Shihab Shaheen
- Starring: Afran Nisho; Nazifa Tushi; Tasnia Farin
- Composer: Khayyam Sanu Sandhi
- Country of origin: Bangladesh
- Original language: Bengali
- No. of seasons: 1
- No. of episodes: 7

Production
- Producer: Redoan Rony
- Cinematography: Kamrul Islam Shubho
- Editor: Zobair Abir Piyal
- Running time: 20-30 mins

Original release
- Network: Chorki
- Release: 8 July – 8 July 2022

Syndicate is a Bangladeshi crime thriller web series written and directed by Shihab Shaheen. This Chorki web platform show, with seven episodes, is produced by Redoan Rony and stars Afran Nisho, Nazifa Tushi and Tasnia Farin in lead roles.

The serial aired on 8 July 2022. Soon after the airing, the serial won the appreciation of the audience.

== Plot ==
The questionable, mysterious Jisha, a bank officer, was killed by being thrown from the roof of the bank in the afternoon. Although everyone calls it suicide, Adnan, colleague and boyfriend of Jisha, thinks that she was killed in cold blood. Adnan is an IT officer with Asperger syndrome. He is running after a syndicate. He is assisted by his colleague and childhood friend Swarna.

== Cast ==
- Afran Nisho-Habibur Rahman Adnan
- Nazifa Tushi-Jobaida Yasmin Zisha
- Tasnia Farin-Samia Sultana Swarna
- Shatabdi Wadud-Sohel Chowdhury
- Rashed Mamun Apu-Naseeruddin Hyder Ratan
- Nasir Uddin Khan-Rafiqul Islam Mia/Shamsur Rahman Swapan alias Allen Swapan/accountant
- Arnab Antu-Robin
- Athena Adhikari-Tithi
- Elina Shammi-Naila
- Zahid Islam
- Sharmeen Sharmi-Rupali Haider
- A K Azad Shetu-Suresh
- Fakhrul Bashar Masum-HR head
- Samu Chowdhury-chairman
- Saif Hussain-Farabi
- Rocky Khan
- Sanjay
- Shikha Khan Mou-Swarna's mother
- Dihan
- Sabita
- Hussain Nirob
- Sayem Samad
- Zulfikar is fickle
- Tuhin Chowdhury
- Ripa Ranjana

== Episodes ==
No.	Episode	Directed by	Written by	Original release date
1	Obyakto	Shihab Shaheen	Shihab Shaheen	8 July 2022
2	Aghat	Shihab Shaheen	Shihab Shaheen	8 July 2022
3	Onneshon	Shihab Shaheen	Shihab Shaheen	8 July 2022
4	Ovinoy	Shihab Shaheen	Shihab Shaheen	8 July 2022
5	Akangkha	Shihab Shaheen	Shihab Shaheen	8 July 2022
6	Onkurito	Shihab Shaheen	Shihab Shaheen	8 July 2022
7	Unmochon	Shihab Shaheen	Shihab Shaheen	8 July 2022

== Production ==
Shihab Shaheen earlier made a web series called Morichika. For his role, Afran Nisho had to undergo research on Asperger syndrome and also change his look. It was scheduled to shoot in December, 2021. The shooting of the web series started from 2 January 2022 in Uttara.

== Reception ==
Khan Tajneen Ahsan of Somoy TV feels that Syndicate is comparable to any international quality content. She praised the performances of its actors especially Nisho. The web series has been streamed for 21598879 minutes breaking all the records of Chorki platform.

== Spin off ==
After the huge success of Syndicate and heartwarming reception from the audience, director Shihab Shaheen announced to make a spin off to the character "Allen Swapan" titled Myself Allen Swapan featuring Nasir Uddin Khan. This was released in Chorki in April 2023.

== Music ==
Khayyam Sanu Sandhi composed the music and wrote the lyrics for the serial. It has a song, voiced by Rehan Rasul and Musharrat Anchal.

List of Songs
No.	Title	Lyrics	Music	Singer(s)	Length
1.	"Kotha Chilo"	Khayyam Sanu Sandhi	Khayyam Sanu Sandhi	Rehan Rasul and Musharrat Anchal	2:59
