= Prince: Once Upon a Time in Dhaka =

2026 Bangladeshi film

- Theatrical poster
- Bengali: প্রিন্স: ওয়ান্স আপন এ টাইম ইন ঢাকা
- Directed by: Abu Hayat Mahmud
- Written by: Mezbah Uddin Sumon
- Screenplay by: Mezbah Uddin Sumon; Mohammad Nazim Uddin
- Produced by: Shirin Sultana
- Starring: Shakib Khan; Tasnia Farin; Jyotirmoyee Kundu; Dibyendu Bhattacharya; Paean Sarkar
- Cinematography: Amit Roy
- Edited by: Soumyajit Bandopadhyay; Sanghamitra Ghosh
- Music by: Arafat Mohsin
- Production company: Creative Land Films
- Distributed by: Jaaz Multimedia; Action Cut Entertainment
- Release date: 21 March 2026
- Running time: 149 minutes
- Country: Bangladesh
- Language: Bengali
- Budget: ৳12 crore (US$980,000)
- Box office: ৳5.7 crore (US$460,000)

Prince: Once Upon a Time in Dhaka (Note: Bengali: প্রিন্স: ওয়ান্স আপন এ টাইম ইন ঢাকা, romanized: Prinsa: Oansa āpaāna e tāima ina Ḍhākā) is a 2026 Bangladeshi Bengali-language action thriller film directed by Abu Hayat Mahmud. The film was produced by Shirin Sultana under the banner of Creative Land Films and distributed by Jaaz Multimedia and Action Cut Entertainment. It stars Shakib Khan, Tasnia Farin, Jyotirmoyee Kundu, Dibyendu Bhattacharya and Paean Sarkar in the lead roles. The film was released on 21 March 2026, coinciding with Eid-ul-Fitr.

The film is the first collaboration between Khan, Farin and Jyotirmoyee. Prince marks as the directorial debut of Abu Hayat Mahmud and producerial debut of Shirin Sultana. It also marks as the Bangladeshi debut of Jyotirmoyee Kundu and Dibyendu Bhattacharya.

Film dialogue is written by Mezbah Uddin Sumon and the screenplay is written by Mezbah Uddin Sumon and Mohammad Nazim Uddin. The cinematographer for the film was Amit Roy and music director is Arafat Mohsin.

It is one of the most expensive Bangladeshi films ever-made. The film was released on 21 March 2026, coinciding with Eid-ul-Fitr 2026. Since its release, the film has received mostly negative reviews.

== Plot ==
In 1990s Dhaka, the film follows *Ibrahim*, a simple boy from old Dhaka who lives with his mother and works a small honest job. Dhaka at that time is run by gangs, extortion and political mafias, and when local thugs try to take over his neighborhood and hurt his family, Ibrahim fights back alone.

The fight changes his life. His courage makes him famous in his vicinity and people start calling him “Prince” because of his virtue to protect the poor. As time passes, he gets deeper into the underworld, to keep control on it, so no one can exploit his people. Within a few years, Prince now becomes the most powerful and legendary name in Dhaka.

But power brings enemies. The biggest threat is *Afghani Pathan*, a brutal, drug-backed gangster who wants to control all of Dhaka's business. There is also constant pressure from corrupt politicians and police who use gangsters for their own profit. Prince gets caught in a bloody cycle of gang wars, shootouts, and betrayals.

In the middle of this darkness, he finds love. He meets *Dilruba*, a sweet, educated girl who sees the good man inside him. With her, he dreams of leaving the crime world, getting married and living a normal life. *Sonia*, another woman in his life, also has a complicated connection to him and adds to the emotional conflict. His mother constantly begs him to leave this path.

Just when Prince decides to surrender everything and start fresh with Dilruba, his closest allies betray him for money and power, leaking his plans to Afghani Pathan. His empire starts to collapse. His house is attacked, his loved ones are targeted.

The film ends in a final, tragic showdown. Prince goes to war alone against Pathan's entire gang to avenge the betrayal and protect his love and mother. He wins the fight and kills his enemies, but loses almost everything in the process. With the help of Dilruba, Prince escapes to India by crossing the Indo-Bangladesh border.

In the post-credit scene, Prince in a Tamil attire attacks some people at a desert in Rajasthan and delivers a speech in Tamil, indicating a sequel

== Cast ==
- Shakib Khan as Ibrahim
- Tasnia Farin as Dilruba
- Jyotirmoyee Kundu as Sonia
- Dibyendu Bhattacharya as Afghani Pathan
- Nasir Uddin Khan as Milon
- Intekhab Dinar as Minhaz
- Rashed Mamun Apu as Fancy Mannan
- Ejajul Islam as Chowdhury Azad Ferdous
- Subrata Dutta as Zulfiqar
- Mahmudul Islam Mithu as Shahid
- Kalyani Mondal as Ibrahim's mother
- Soumyadeep Chakraborty as Chita Johnny
- Sharif Siraj as Bhutti
- Loknath Dey as Gopal Kaur
- Paean Sarkar as Nanda, Kaur's wife
- Mrityunjoy Bhattacharya as Babu

== Production ==
=== Development ===
The film was initially developed following with an announcement on 27 February 2024 at a press conference held in Eskaton, Dhaka, by director Abu Hayat Mahmud. At the time, the project was titled Once Upon a Time in Dhaka: Ami Kala. Mahmud stated that the film would be a thriller with elements of suspense and that shooting was planned to begin in May.

It was also announced at the press conference that the screenplay was written by Mezbah Uddin Sumon, and that the two principal roles would be played by actors from Dhaka and West Bengal, respectively. In addition, Tariq Anam Khan, Shahiduzzaman Selim, Salahuddin Lavlu, and musician Pritom Ahmed were announced as part of the cast.

At the time, speculation emerged that the film's story was largely inspired by real events and centered on the life of Kala Jahangir, an underworld figure active in Dhaka during the 1990s. Reports had also suggested that Mosharraf Karim was being considered for the lead role, while other reports had mentioned Sariful Razz as another possible choice for the lead role. However, in early July 2025, multiple media outlets reported that Shakib Khan had been finalised to portray the title character of Kala Jahangir. (Note: Attributed to multiple sources:)

Reports circulating across social media platforms and mainstream news outlets asserted that the film was conceived as a biographical depiction of Kala Jahangir, a figure associated with Dhaka's underworld during the 1990s. In response, producer Shirin Sultana issued an official statement rejecting the claims in their entirety. She emphasized that the project is not intended as a biographical representation of any individual, but rather a fictional narrative set against the socio-cultural backdrop of Dhaka in the 1990s, combining elements of crime, romance, action, emotional conflict, and family drama. (Note: Attributed to multiple sources:)

Prince: Once Upon a Time in Dhaka marks Mahmud's feature film directorial debut after having directing more than two hundred fiction and documentary projects. The film is produced by Creative Land Films, with Shirin Sultana serving as producer. Channel i had reported that filming was scheduled to take place in Dhaka for four days, followed by the remaining portions in Sri Lanka, Channel i also reported that, according to Mahmud, the film's initial planned budget was around ৳7–8 crore and that the budget would be increased if necessary.

The makeup artist for the film was Amit Amberkar, who confirmed his involvement through an Instagram post. Arafat Mohsin Nidhi was signed to compose the background score for the film on 5 August 2025. He had previously composed the background scores for Toofan, Borbaad, and Taandob, all starring Shakib Khan. Nidhi stated that the background score will include character-specific themes and will reflect the popularity of rock music in Bangladesh during the film's time period.

A report published by bdnews24.com on 5 January 2026 stated that several Bollywood professionals would be involved in the film, handling cinematography, choreography, action direction, and makeup. Mahmud said that cinematography would be handled by Amit Roy, known for his work on Animal (2023), Dunki (2023), and Sarkar (2005), among other projects. The makeup artist from the same film was also reported to be responsible for Khan's look in the film. He confirmed that the film's story was written by Mezbah Uddin Sumon, while the screenplay was co-written by Sumon and Mohammad Nazim Uddin. Later Amit Roy was signed as the director of photography for the film. His involvement was confirmed by the production company Creative Land Films through a social media announcement. According to media reports, Roy is scheduled to work on the film for approximately forty days and is reported to be receiving a remuneration of around ৳1 crore taka.

Alongside Roy, cinematography was also handled by Shaillesh Awasthi, who had earlier worked on Borbaad (2025).

=== Casting ===
Actor Shakib Khan signed his contract for the film on 2 July 2025, a development confirmed by the production company to The Daily Star. According to media reports, Shakib Khan received a remuneration of ৳3 crore for the film, as confirmed by the producer. The producer also stated that Khan was briefed on the film's story during a 45-minute narration session prior to signing on to the project. On 11 September, actor Rashed Mamun Apu was signed for a key role in the film, marks his on-screen collaboration with Shakib Khan following their appearance together in the 2020 film Nabab LLB.

On 4 September, the production company Creative Land Films announced auditions for the film's principal female character, Mili. Mahmud stated that the film would feature three female roles, two of which would be portrayed by established performers, while the third role was intended to introduce a newcomer. He added that the selected actor would share screen space with Shakib Khan and make her film debut through the project. In late October 2025, reports suggested that Idhika Paul would be cast as the female lead in the film, and that she reportedly demanded a remuneration of around ৳30 lakh. (Note: Attributed to multiple sources:). Subsequently, several individuals associated with the film told The Daily Star that she was dropped from the project due to disagreements over remuneration. (Note: Attributed to multiple sources:)

The report also stated that Indian television actress Jyotirmoyee Kundu was being considered as her replacement. In late November, Creative Land Films officially confirmed the involvement of Kundu in the film. It marks the second film of her acting career, following her debut in the Indian Bengali film Projapati 2 (2025) alongside Dev.

In early November 2025, several media outlets reported that Tasnia Farin was being considered for the role of the film's female lead as a replacement. (Note: Attributed to multiple sources:) On 15 November, her casting was officially confirmed after she signed a contract for the film, as announced by Creative Land Films on social media. Jugantor reported that she was cast as Dilruba. Sabila Nur also acted in this film, which is Sabila Nur's second commercial film. She previously acted opposite Shakib Khan in the film Taandob (2025).

Veteran actor Nasir Uddin Khan joined the cast in early December. Intekhab Dinar also appears in the film. In an interview, he described his experience working on the project positively and praised Mahmud's approach to the film.

According to a report by Anandabazar Patrika on 23 February 2026, actor Loknath Dey was cast as Gopal Kaur, an associate of Shakib Khan in the film, marking his second collaboration with Khan after Toofan (2024). Actress Paean Sarkar was reported to portray Kaur's wife, who becomes a female crime leader following her husband's death and later forms an alliance with Khan. Television actor Mrityunjoy Bhattacharya was cast as Babu.

=== Filming ===
Mahmud initially stated that the film's production was expected to commence in the first week of December. Following months of speculation, filming of Prince began on 6 January 2026 in Dhaka. A large portion of the film was initially scheduled to be shot in Hyderabad, with Kolkata later added to the filming plan. Following political changes after the July Revolution of 2024 and subsequent strains in Bangladesh–India relations, reports indicated that several members of the production team were unable to obtain visas despite repeated applications. Consequently, the producers decided to relocate the portions originally planned for filming in India to Sri Lanka. Shakib Khan traveled to Sri Lanka on 15 January to take part in the film's shooting and began filming on 17 January. According to a 27 January report by The Daily Star, filming was scheduled to continue for the following ten days across multiple locations in Sri Lanka. According to a report published by News24 on 4 February 2026, Tasnia Farin completed filming her portions in Sri Lanka.

Subsequently, on 8 February, multiple media outlets reported that filming in India had commenced after visa-related issues were resolved. However, director Mahmud did not comment on the reports at the time, stating that an official announcement would be made later. (Note: Attributed to multiple sources:)

After completing the Sri Lanka schedule, filming began in Kolkata in the second week of February. Scenes were filmed across locations in Howrah, Bowbazar, Alipore Central Jail, and Bharat Lakshmi Studio. Key action sequences were shot at an abandoned factory in Howrah beginning on 9 February, followed by filming at Madho Bhavan in Bowbazar on 11 February. After completing the Kolkata schedule, the production team planned to continue filming in Hyderabad.

As of 2 March 2026, Channel i reported that filming was nearly complete, with only the songs sequences remaining.

== Themes and influences ==
The story of Prince: Once Upon a Time in Dhaka is set in Dhaka during the 1990s and centres on crime and violence within the city. According to Mahmud, the film is conceived on a larger-than-life scale and is intended to appeal to a wide audience. He stated that the narrative combines elements of crime, romance, action, emotional drama, and family relationships.

== Music ==
The first song of the film, "Pori" released on 19 March 2026 and became popular with audiences. The song was performed by Imran Mahmudul and Konal, written by Robiul Islam Jibon, and composed by Imran himself. The second song, "Jala Jala", was released on March 20, which is basically an item song. The song was sung by Pritom Hasan and Runa Laila.The song was written by Russell Mahmud and composed by Pritom himself. The third song of the film, "Disco Shundori", was released on 26 March. The song was written and sung by G. M. Ashraf and composed by Adib Kabir. Ashraf's co-singer was Dola Rahman. On 10 May, the fourth song of the film, "Maa" released. The song was written, composed and sung by G. M. Ashraf.

No.	Title	Lyrics	Music	Singer(s)	Length
1.	"Pori"	Robiul Islam Jibon	Imran Mahmudul	Imran Mahmudul, Konal	03:30
2.	"Jala Jala"	Russell Mahmud	Pritom Hasan	Pritom Hasan, Runa Laila	03:26
3.	"Disco Shundori"	G.M. Ashraf	Adib Kabir	G.M. Ashraf, Dola Rahman	01:49
4.	"Maa"	G.M. Ashraf	G.M. Ashraf	G.M. Ashraf	03:08

=== Notes ===
- Exact release dates, composers, lyricists, and singers for some tracks are not fully specified as some songs may be fan-made or pending official confirmation.
- The total length of the soundtrack is unavailable due to incomplete track duration data.

== Marketing ==
The film's first-look poster was released on 22 August 2025, featuring references to several crime-prone areas of Dhaka during the 1990s. Subsequently, a 16-second first-look motion poster was revealed on 1 February 2026, featuring Shakib Khan. The film's second poster was unveiled on 3 March 2026, initiating the official countdown to its release and featuring the phrase "Sixteen Days to Go". The film's teaser was released on 12 March, 2026, labeled as a pre-blast.

Bangladesh Film Certification Board give the film an A (adult) certificate.

== Release ==
The film was released in theaters in Bangladesh on Eid-ul-Fitr on 21 March 2026, clashing with Rakkhosh, Domm, Bonolota Express and Pressure Cooker. The film was shown simultaneously in 133 theaters. However, due to server complications, there were problems with the screening in several theaters. There were also incidents of vandalism in some theaters. Prince received its first show in STAR Cineplex on 25 March 2026.

A special screening of the film was held at STAR Cineplex in Dhaka on April 5. The film's actors and actresses were present.

=== International release ===
The producer has fixed the flaws in the film and released it in Italy for expatriate Bangladeshis. The film was screened in Venice on April 18 and in Rome on April 20.

=== OTT release ===
The film was released in the new platform Utshob on 21 May 2026, clashing with Rakkhosh which is also releasing in the same platform.

=== Online piracy ===
On 26 March 2026, Jugantor reported that the film had been pirated and several images and video clips had been leaked onto social media platforms such as YouTube and Facebook.

=== TV streaming ===
Seven contemporary full-length films will be shown on Channel i for seven consecutive days during the holy Eid-ul-Adzha holiday. The world premiere of seven new films will be held every day at 10:15 am. They confirmed this through a press release. Prince will be screened on the second day of the Eid-al-Adha holiday.

== Controversy ==
The teaser of the film was released on 12 March to criticism on social media. Questions were raised about the film's VFX. There were also locational errors in the teaser, such as the Nakhoda Mosque in Kolkata shown as a mosque in Old Dhaka. Another scene showed a WiFi router, which did not exist in the 1990s. Towheed Feroze of bdnews24.com later criticised such errors as "sacrilege" in the actual film. There were also problems with the film's screening due to server problems, though they were later resolved. In a report in Prothom Alo, Pritha Paramita Nag said that it would have been better if the film had been made with the same care as the last scene.

Since its release, the film has received mostly negative reviews.

=== Censorship issue ===
The Bangladesh Film Certification Board has suspended the film's censor certificate on 6 May 2026. It has been alleged that some songs and scenes have been added to the film without the board's approval. In addition, it is reported that the warnings regarding smoking and drug use have been changed or tampered with in the approved copy. In addition, there have been allegations of re-insertion of cut scenes. Based on these allegations of irregularities, the certification certificate of the film has been suspended. According to the director, "The Indian version and OTT version were mistakenly screened during the film's theatrical run."

Later, on 24 May 2026, the Bangladesh Film Certification Board lifted the suspension of the film's certificate. From now on, the film can be shown in all theaters. It was reported that the suspension of the film's certificate has been lifted, stating that the producer will no longer air the cut and unapproved scenes.

== Reception ==
=== Critical response ===
Towheed Feroze of Bdnews24.com, heavily criticized Prince: Once Upon a Time in Dhaka for its lack of authenticity, unoriginal plot, and technical flaws. He noted that the film failed to depict the real spirit of Old Dhaka by filming in West Bengal, and pointed out major historical anachronisms in its costumes, vehicles, and props. Feroze further panned the movie's weak visual effects, derivative action sequences, and absence of authentic local dialects.

Pritha Paramita Nag of Prothom Alo, criticized Prince: Once Upon a Time in Dhaka for its disjointed narrative, weak visual effects, and execution flaws. The review highlighted significant temporal and spatial inconsistencies in depicting 1990s Old Dhaka. While criticizing the average action choreography and poor lead chemistry, Nag praised select musical tracks and strong supporting performances, particularly by Tasnia Farin.

Mahfuzur Rahman of Jago News 24 noted for offering a conventional, predictable plot with a slow-paced screenplay devoid of memorable twists. While Shakib Khan's screen presence received moderate appreciation, the film drew criticism for its unpolished dialogue, underdeveloped supporting characters particularly the female leads played by Tasnia Farin and Jyotirmoyee Kundu and inconsistent accents among the cross-border cast.

== Impact ==
The film's final scene features Shakib Khan delivering dialogues in Tamil. The entire scene was released on YouTube by the production company on March 21, 2026. The production company calls the scene "Mass Mode" or "Teaser 2".

== Accolades ==
Awards	Category	Recipient(s)	Result	Ref
5th BIFA Awards	Best singer	Imran Mahmudul	Won	
Meril-Prothom Alo Awards	Best Film	Prince	Nominated	
Meril-Prothom Alo Awards	Best Film Actress	Tasnia Farin	Nominated	
Meril-Prothom Alo Awards	Best Singer (female)	Somnur Monir Konal	Nominated	
Meril-Prothom Alo Awards	Best Singer (male)	Imran Mahmudul	Nominated	
Meril-Prothom Alo Awards	Best Singer (male)	Pritom Hasan	Nominated	

== See also ==
- Cinema of Bangladesh
