= Barkat Hossain Polash =

Bangladeshi cinematographer

- বরকত হোসেন পলাশ
- Education: Dhaka University
- Occupations: Cinematographer, producer
- Notable work: Jalal's Story, Taqdeer, Karagar

Barkat Hossain Polash (Bengali: বরকত হোসেন পলাশ) is a Bangladeshi cinematographer and producer. Starting as an assistant camera operator, he became involved in both feature films and web series.

== Biography ==
Polash learned basic photography skills from Pathshala. He graduated from the University of Dhaka with a degree in economics. He began to work as an assistant camera operator for the BBC. In 2011, he went to work for Sandbag Ltd., a Bangladeshi photo equipment rental firm. For two years he served as a camera assistant, working on nearly 150 television commercials.

Polash was the cinematographer for the 2014 film Jalal's Story, which was his feature film debut. In 2015, he attended the Busan Asian Film School. He received an award from the 2016 SAARC Film Festival in Sri Lanka for his cinematography work on Jalal's Story. He was one of seven cinematographers for the 2018 anthology film Sincerely Yours, Dhaka.

In the early 2020s, he worked on a number of web series, including Taqdeer, Mohanagar, and Karagar.

For 2024's film Saba, he received positive comments. Jason Gorber wrote in Collider, "Polash captures ... Dhaka in muted tones, the dank corridors and sodium-lit streetscapes a flurry of ambers and dark blues ... shot in ways that feel sickly and uninviting, a visual canvas that consistently mirrors the emotional travails of these characters". Polash was also one of the film's producers.

Polash joined the 15-member executive committee of the Cameraman Association of Bangladesh in October 2024.

== Filmography ==
Year	Name	Role	Note
2014	Jalal's Story	Cinematographer	Feature film; released in Bangladesh on November 6, 2014
2018	Sincerely Yours, Dhaka	Cinematographer	Anthology film with seven cinematographers
2020	Taqdeer	Cinematographer	Web series
2021	Mohanagar	Cinematographer	Web series (8 episodes); premiered on Hoichoi on June 25, 2021
2021	Unoloukik	Cinematographer	Anthology web series with five cinematographers
2021	Jaago Bahey	Director of Photography	Web series (1 episode); premiered on Chorki
2021	Kathal	Cinematographer	Feature film
2021	Mission Extreme	Second cinematographer	Feature film; released on December 3, 2021
2021	Morning Coffee	Cinematographer	Short film
2021	Bagher Bachcha	Cinematographer	TV movie
2022	Birani	Cinematographer	Short film
2022	Karagar	Cinematographer	Web series; premiered on Hoichoi on August 19, 2022
2022	Ripples	Cinematographer	Short film
2023	Punormilone	Cinematographer	TV movie
2023	Mercules	Cinematographer	Web series; premiered on streaming platform Chorki
2023	Roktojoba	Cinematographer	Feature film
2023	A Tale of Two Sisters	Cinematographer	Feature film
2023	Guti	Cinematographer	Web series; premiered on streaming platform Chorki
2024	Saba	Cinematographer	Feature film; released at the Red Sea International Film Festival
2024	Kaalpurush	Cinematographer	Web series (7 episodes)
2024	Dear Maloti	Cinematographer	
