= Syed Ashik Rahman =

Bangladeshi Media executive

- Born: Dhaka, Bangladesh
- Known for: CEO of RTV Bangladesh

Syed Ashik Rahman is a Bangladeshi media executive, television host, and film producer. He is known for his role as chief executive officer (CEO) of RTV Bangladesh, a private television channel based in Dhaka. In addition to his responsibilities at RTV, Rahman is the editor-in-chief of the news portal RTV Online, and the publisher and editor of Look At Me, a monthly magazine focused on fashion and lifestyle. Since 2018, he has also served as a director at Bengal Multimedia Ltd, a company involved in television and film production. Rahman’s work includes the production of several films and television programs. In 2020, his documentary received the National Film Award for Best Documentary. Rahman is also involved in hosting and moderating several television talk shows.

== Host ==
Syed Ashik Rahman is the host and moderator of RTV's popular talk show Unnayane Bangladesh (Bangladesh of development), Star of Politics, Diplomatic Zone, Forth Right, Business Talk and Kemon Chai Bangladesh (What kind of Bangladesh do you want?).

== Film producer ==
Ashik Rahman has been involved in film production since 2018. In that year, the film Janmabhoomi, directed by Prasoon Rahman and focusing on the Rohingya refugee crisis, premiered at the United Nations Headquarters. In 2019, Rahman produced Jodi Ekdin (If One Day), directed by Muhammad Mostafa Kamal Raj, and the thriller Sapudu, directed by Golam Sohrab Dodul. In January 2020, the film Sawsur Bari Zindabad-2, directed by Debashish Biswas, was cleared by the censor board. In 2023, he produced Leader: Amie Bangladesh under Bengal Multimedia, directed by Topu Khan and starring Shakib Khan and Shobnom Bubly. The film was described as a commercial success and one of the highest-grossing Bangladeshi films of the year.

== Publications ==
- “Bramon Bramia Shese (Story after a long travel)”
