= Bir (film) =

2020 Bangladeshi film directed by Kazi Hayat

- Official first-look poster
- Bengali: বীর
- Directed by: Kazi Hayat
- Written by: Kazi Hayat
- Produced by: Shakib Khan; Mohammad Iqbal
- Starring: Shakib Khan; Shabnom Bubly; Misha Sawdagor; Sadek Bacchu; Nana Shah
- Cinematography: Saiful Shahin
- Edited by: Touhid Hossain Chowdhury
- Music by: Emon Saha
- Production company: SK Films
- Distributed by: Sunan Films (Bangladesh); Star Studios (India)
- Release date: 14 February 2020
- Running time: 142 minutes
- Country: Bangladesh
- Language: Bengali
- Budget: ৳1.2 crore (US$98,000)

Bir (Bengali: বীর) is a 2020 Bangladeshi political action-drama film written and directed by Kazi Hayat. It features Shakib Khan and Shabnom Bubly in the lead roles. It is co-produced by Shakib Khan and Mohammad Iqbal under the banner of SK Films.

Principal photography began on 15 July 2019, and wrapped up in January 2020. The film was released on 14 February 2020 on the occasion of Valentine's Day. The film won National Film Awards twice at the 45th Bangladesh National Film Awards.

== Cast ==
- Shakib Khan as Antu aka Bir
- Shabnom Bubly as Helena
- Hridoy Islam as Abir
- Misha Sawdagor as Dilu Bepari
- Nana Shah as Abul Kalam Munshi aka Khuinna Kalam
- Sadek Bacchu
- Shabnam Parvin
- Shiba Shanu
- Kazi Hayat as Sazzad Chowdhury (Special Appearance)

== Production ==
Shakib Khan was contracted for the film Bir on September 26, 2018, when Mohammad Iqbal was supposed to produce the film. Later, succession of Hero: The Superstar in 2014 and Password in 2019, On 23 June 2019 Shakib Khan announced the production of four films together with Bir from his own production company SK Films.

The film marked the 50th directorial venture of Kazi Hayat and first collaboration between Shakib Khan and Kazi Hayat. The film is dedicated to father of the nation Bangabandhu Sheikh Mujibur Rahman.

=== Casting ===
On 2018 September 27, the lead actor and producer of the film Shakib Khan signed a contract for the "Bir" character of the film. On 2018, after the announcement of film making it was reported from the production company and producer that Shabnam Bubly will be acting in the film. Due to no formal announcement at the time many media reported that Shabnom Bubly is not staying in the film. After that on 15 July 2019 Shabnom Bubly officially contracted sign for the film.

On 2019 August 24, Ariana Zaman was contracted for a role in the films, it is also her debut film.

=== Filming ===
Though the shooting of Bir was scheduled to begin on 2019 January 10, the shooting of the film was halted due to the illness of director Kazi Hayat. On 15 July, Muhurat of the film was held at the Shruti Studio in Dhaka. Then, on the same day, the official filming of the film began at BFDC. The first phase depicts scenes of Shakib Khan and his friend's childhood and father, three days drawn till July 18. Shakib Khan's character name is Antu and his friend's character is Miran. After that, the lead actor of the film Shakib Khan was out of the shooting for almost one and a half month to create the perfect look for the movie. After this, again the filming of it gets stuck. Later, he participated in the second phase of filming in Pubail at Dhaka on November 28 of this year. Then, on December 2, Shabnom Bubly participated in the filming. The second phase of filming participated Shakib Khan, Shabnom Bubly, Misha Sawdagor and other artists. Later, on December 7, filming of the climax and action scene began.

On 2019 December 25 Shakib Khan was admitted to the LabAid Hospital in Dhaka due to cold fever and gastric problems, then the film was stopped for about a week due to his illness.

The film was complete with patchwork on January 26, 2020.

== Soundtrack ==
Bir: Original Motion Picture Soundtrack

Soundtrack album by Shawkat Ali Emon, Akassh and Ahmed Sagir
- Recorded: 2019
- Genre: Feature film soundtrack
- Language: Bangla
- Label: SK Films
- Producers: Shakib Khan, Mohammad Iqbal

Shawkat Ali Emon, Akassh and Ahmed Sagir chronology
Password (2019)	Bir: Original Motion Picture Soundtrack (2020)

Singles from Bir
- 1. "Tumi Amar Jibon (তুমি আমার জীবন)" Released: 6 February 2020; 2. "Toke Dekhle Shudhu Ekti Bar (তোকে দেখলে শুধু একটি বার)" Released: 11 February 2020; 3. "Miss Bubly" Released: 11 February 2020; 4. "Ki Chomotkar Dekha Gelo (কি চমৎকার দেখা গেল)" Released: 12 February 2020

The film soundtrack is composed Shawkat Ali Emon, Akassh and Ahmed Sagir, while background score are composed by Emon Saha. A total of four songs have been used in the film, Imran Mahmudul and Konal have sung the first song, title is Tumi Amar Jibon. It is composed by Akassh and lyrics by Kabir Bakul. Habib Rahman also choreographed of the song. The title of the song Tumi Amar Jibon is taken from the same title song by Zafar Iqbal and Bobita's Abujh Hridoy by Ahmed Imtiaz Bulbul Tune and lyrics and sung by Andrew Kishore and Runa Laila. The song was released on Shakib Khan's official YouTube channel SK Films on February 7, 2020. the second song of the film Toke Dekhle Shudhu Ekti Bar was released on February 11, the song sung by Akash Mahmood. It is composed by Shawkat Ali Emon and lyrics by Faisal Rabbikin. Then on the same day released its third song; The item song titled is Miss Bubly, sung by Somnur Monir Konal. The music of this song is composed by Akassh and lyrics written by Priyo Chattopadhyay. It also used a poetic song titled Ki Chomotkar Dekha Gelo, sung by Monir Khan. The song composed by Ahmed Sagir and lyrics written by Munshi Wadud. On February 12, the song was released on YouTube channel of SK Films.

Track listing
No.	Title	Lyrics	Music	Singer(s)	Length
1.	"Tumi Amar Jibon (তুমি আমার জীবন)" (The song title collected from 1989 film Abujh Hridoy)	Kabir Bakul	Akassh	Imran Mahmudul, Konal	4:17
2.	"Toke Dekhle Shudhu Ekti Bar (তোকে দেখলে শুধু একটি বার)"	Faisal Rabbikin	Shawkat Ali Emon	Akash Mahmood
3.	"Miss Bubly"	Priyo Chattopadhyay	Akassh	Konal
4.	"Ki Chomotkar Dekha Gelo (কি চমৎকার দেখা গেল)"	Munshi Wadud	Ahmed Sagir	Monir Khan

== Marketing and release ==
On February 12, 2020, production house of the film SK Films, hosted a talk show at the Samson Hall of Dhaka Club for the occasion of release of the film. State Minister of Information Murad Hasan, film personalities including actors Faruk, Alamgir were present on the occasion.

The film was released on February 14, 2020, on the occasion of Valentine's Day in 80 theatres all over the country.

== Reception ==
Events	Date of Events	Category	Nominee	Results	Ref
National Film Awards	23 March 2022	Best Female Singer	Somnur Monir Konal	Won	
National Film Awards	23 March 2022	Best Negative Actor	Misha Sawdagor	Won	
