= Sanjida Preeti =

Bangladeshi actress, model and dancer

Sanjida Anwar Preeti
- Education: BBA
- Alma mater: North South University
- Occupations: Actress, model, dancer
- Spouse: Jibran Tanveer (m. 2014–present)

Sanjida Preeti is a Dhallywood Bangladeshi actress, model, and dancer. She was born in Dhaka, Bangladesh.

== Personal life ==
Preeti is the youngest among five siblings. She married Jibran in 2014. She is the cousin of film hero Nayeem.

== Career ==
Preeti started her acting career through the theater and later acted in Sporsher Baire, Kachher Manush, Doll's House, Poush Faguner Pala and single drama such as Nil Ushnotai Kadi, Ebong Bonolata Sen, Drishti Dan in television. She is an actor in Prachyanat Natok theatre group and has acted in Koinna, Punorjonmo, etc.

== Works ==
=== Drama serial ===
- Sporsher Baire
- Kacher Manush (2006)
- Doll's House
- Poush Faguner Pala
- Baburchiana (2018)
- Aynabaji Original Series(2017)
- Rup
- Dugdugi
- Brihospoti Tunge
- Sayankal (সায়ংকাল)

=== Single drama ===
- Valobashi Tai Valobeshe Jai
- Nil Ushnotai Kadi
- Ebong Bonolata Sen
- Drishti Dan
- Bakbakum Valobasha
- Bodle Jawar Golpo
- ব্যালকনি
- Jolmanob
- Kolmilota
- Color Full (2017)
- Happiness (2017)
- Bodhu Miche Raag Korona (2018)
- Surface (2020)
- Achor (2018)
- Jahanara Er Akti Bhai Chilo
- অন্য সকাল
- Golmal
- পাতকি
- খোলসবন্দী
- Aguner Maye (আগুনের মেয়ে)

=== Films ===
- 1971 Ei Shob Din (Upcoming)
- Mridha Vs Mridha (2022)

=== Web series ===
- Taqdeer (2020)
