= Habibur Rahman (choreographer) =

Bangladeshi choreographer

- হাবিবুর রহমান
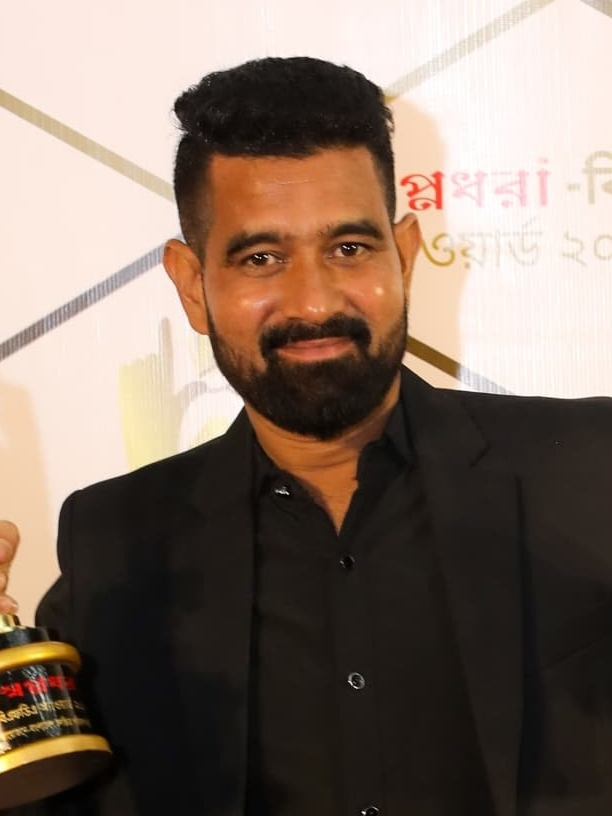
- Rahman in 2024
- Occupation: Choreographer

Habibur Rahman is a Bangladeshi choreographer. He won Bangladesh National Film Award for Best Choreography twice for the films Moner Moto Manush Pailam Na (2019) and Lal Shari (2023).
