= Nasir Uddin Khan =

Bangladeshi actor

- নাসির উদ্দিন খান
- Born: November 21, 1972 (age 53)
- Occupation: Actor
- Years active: 1995–present

Nasir Uddin Khan is a Bangladeshi actor. He is known for portraying Alen Shwapon in the television series Syndicate. He also acted in Mohanagar and Taqdeer. He won the Bangladesh National Film Award for Best Supporting Actor for his role in the film Poran (2022).

== Early life ==
Nasir Uddin Khan was born in Chattogram to Monu Meah Shordar and Ambia Khatun.

== Career ==
Khan started his acting career as a theatre artist in 1995 in Chittagong. He continued acting in the theatre till 2015. In 2016, he moved to Dhaka to work in film and television. In 2020, he made his OTT debut through Hares. But he got a major breakthrough by portraying Kaiser in Mohanagar. In 2022, he acted on Hawa. In October 2022, he appeared as the coach of Shadhin Bangla Football Team in Damal.

== Works ==
Films

Key
†	Denotes films that have not yet been released

Year	Title	Role	Notes	Ref.
2019	No Dorai	Ayesha's husband		
2021	The Dark Side of Dhaka	Shanta's friend	Released on iTheatre	
2021	Khachar Bhitor Ochin Pakhi	Ramij's righthand	Released on Chorki	
2022	Redrum	Iqram	Released on Chorki	
2022	Poran	Shopon	Winner — Bangladesh National Film Awards for Best Supporting Actor	
2022	Hawa	Nagu		
2022	Damal	Football coach		
2022	Made in Chittagong	Fokir	Chittagonian language film	
2023	Friday	Pokat	Released on Binge	
2023	Prohelika	Jamshed		
2023	Patalghor	Benazir	Released on Chorki	
2024	Omar	Bodi		
2024	840	MP Kazi Dablu		
2025	Rickshaw Girl	Mamun		
2025	Boli – The Wrestler	Moju		
2026	Prince: Once Upon a Time in Dhaka	Milon		
2026	Master	Jahir	Premiered in London Indian Film Festival	
2026	Lapata †	TBA	Filming	
2026	Manusher Bagaan †	TBA	Post-production	
2026	Alga Nongor †	TBA	Completed	
2027	Nissho †	TBA	Filming	
TBA	Suraiya †	Basar	Post-production	

Web series and television

Year	Title	Role	Notes	Ref.
2020	Taqdeer	Dilip		
2021	Mohanagar	Mugger Kaiser		
2021	Boli	Shahjahan Boli		
2022	Syndicate	Allen Swapan		
2023	Guti	Nannu		
2023	Myself Allen Swapan	Siddiqur Rahman Swapan "Allen Swapan" / Shamsur Rahman Tapan	Dual role	
2025	Myself Allen Swapan 2	Siddiqur Rahman Swapan "Allen Swapan" / Shamsur Rahman Tapan		

== Awards and nominations ==
Year	Award	Category	Work	Result	Ref.
2023	Blender's Choice-The Daily Star OTT Awards	Best Actor in a Negative Role	Syndicate	Won	
2025	Meril-Prothom Alo Awards	Best Actor in Web Series (Critics)	Myself Allen Swapan 2	Won	
