= Myself Allen Swapan =

2023 Bangladeshi crime drama streaming television series

- Poster
- Bengali: মাইসেলফ অ্যালেন স্বপন
- Genre: Crime; Thriller; Drama
- Screenplay by: Shihab Shaheen
- Story by: Shihab Shaheen; Robiul Alam Robi
- Directed by: Shihab Shaheen
- Theme music composer: Khayam Sanu Sandhi
- Composer: Khayam Sanu Sandhi
- Country of origin: Bangladesh
- Original language: Bengali
- No. of seasons: 2
- No. of episodes: 14

Production
- Executive producers: Abrar Jahin Rafee; Kanak Khondoker; Abrar Jahin Rafee; Zakir Hossain Simanto
- Producer: Redoan Rony
- Production location: Cox's Bazar
- Cinematography: Kamrul Islam Shubho
- Editor: Leon Rozario
- Camera setup: Multi-camera
- Running time: 42 minutes

Original release
- Network: Chorki
- Release: 22 April 2023

Myself Allen Swapan (Bengali: মাইসেলফ অ্যালেন স্বপন) is a Bangladeshi crime drama streaming television series directed by Shihab Shaheen. The seven-episode series was released on 22 April 2023 on Chorki. The series stars Nasir Uddin Khan, Rafiyath Rashid Mithila in lead roles. Syndicate, thus making Myself Allen Swapan is a spin-off series universe. The season 2 of the series was released on 2025.

== Story ==
Allen Swapan lives in Chittagong, is a drug dealer and has a son named Jadu.

On the other hand, Md. Shamsur Rahman and Shayla are husband and wife. Shamsur is an insurance company official by profession.

Swapan and Badu, childhood friends, used to trade illegal drugs in a joint partnership. After being chased by the police from Cox's Bazar, he hid for a while in an abandoned house on the hill.

Swapan embezzled Tk 400 crores of his friend Badur's share and killed Shamsur Rahman in a trick and disguised himself as a husband to Shamsur Rahman's wife Shayla (Allen Swapan and Shamsur Rahman look exactly the same).

At one point, Shayla's brother Iqbal and his entourage along with Badu kidnap a disguised Swapan to extort a share of the money, forcing him to confess that he is Allen Swapan. Swapan was subjected to inhuman torture but he identified himself as Shamsur Rahman. Swapan knew that if he confessed, he would be killed after recovering 400 hundred crores of Takas and Swapan remained silent even after seeing his son Jadu killed in front of his eyes.

== Cast ==
- Nasir Uddin Khan as Siddiqur Rahman Swapan aka Allen Swapan and Md. Shamsur Rahman Tapan
- Rafiath Rashid Mithila as Allen Swapan's wife Shaila
- Shatabdi Wadud as Selim Chowdhury
- Aiman Shima
- Sumon Anwar as Tanzil
- Abdullah Al Sentu as Jadu
- Rafiul Quader Rube as Badu
- Farhad Limon
- Abdullah Al Sentou
- Arnav Tripura
- Mishkat Mahmud
- Zahid Islam
- Ready Mahadi
- Baijid Hasan

== Episodes ==
No.	Episode	Directed by	Written by	Original release date
1	The Dead Man	Shihab Shaheen	Shihab Shaheen	22 April 2023
2	The Family Man	Shihab Shaheen	Shihab Shaheen	22 April 2023
3	The Lady's Man	Shihab Shaheen	Shihab Shaheen	22 April 2023
4	The Conman	Shihab Shaheen	Shihab Shaheen	22 April 2023
5	The Businessman	Shihab Shaheen	Shihab Shaheen	22 April 2023
6	The Shrewd Man	Shihab Shaheen	Shihab Shaheen	22 April 2023
7	The End Game	Shihab Shaheen	Shihab Shaheen	22 April 2023

== Other media ==
"Chronicles of Allen Swapan," the comic, was released at the 2025 Ekushey Book Fair. The cover of the comic book was officially unveiled on 20th February at the Dhaka Comics stall.

== Reception ==
Jannatul Naym Pieal of The Business Standard praised Myself Allen Swapan as a successful spin-off superior to Syndicate, highlighting Nasir Uddin Khan's strong performance, solid direction, and cinematography, despite minor pacing issues in early episodes.

Zinia Bandyopadhyay of India Today, praised Myself Allen Swapan as a gripping thriller with a compelling plot and exceptional performances from Nasir Uddin Khan and Rafiath Rashid Mithila, calling it a successful spin-off despite minor narrative flaws.

Aunim Shams of The Business Standard, felt Myself Allen Swapan 2 fell short of its predecessor's hype, praising Nasir Uddin Khan's acting and dialogue delivery while criticizing the straightforward climax, underused supporting cast, and lack of character development.

Arnab Sanyal of Independent Television praised Myself Allen Swapon: Season 2 for its fast-paced plot and strong technical elements, particularly highlighting Nasir Uddin Khan's lead performance and Xefer Rahman's acting.
