= Prohelika =

2023 Bangladeshi romantic thriller film

- The film's poster
- Directed by: Chayanika Chowdhury
- Screenplay by: Pantho Shahriar
- Story by: Pantho Shahriar
- Produced by: Jamal Hossain
- Starring: Mahfuz Ahmed; Shobnom Bubly; Nasir Uddin Khan
- Cinematography: Sumon Hossain
- Edited by: Ramzan Ali
- Music by: Emon Saha
- Production company: Rangan Music
- Distributed by: Jaaz Multimedia
- Release date: 29 June 2023
- Country: Bangladesh
- Language: Bengali
- Budget: est. ৳20 million (US$160,000)

Prohelika (Translation: Enigma) is a Bangladeshi romantic thriller film directed by Chayanika Chowdhury, which was her second directorial, and produced by Rangan Music. The film features Mahfuz Ahmed, Shobnom Bubly and Nasir Uddin Khan in lead roles.

== Premise ==
Mona suddenly came to Ustad Jamshed and Arpa's home one day. During his stay in that house, over time Mona and Arpa fall in love with each other and get involved in a love affair.

== Cast ==
- Mahfuz Ahmed as Mona
- Shobnom Bubly as Arpa
- Nasir Uddin Khan as Jamshed
- Rashed Mamun Apu
- AK Azad Setu as Abul
- Rahmat Ali
- Sabiha Zaman
- Shyamol Zakaria

== Production ==
After directing Bishwoshundori, Chayanika Chowdhury announced the production of Prohelika on 14 February 2022 for the Valentine's Day. The film was scheduled to shoot in May of the same year. After that it was decided to start filming in 1 June but it was not possible due to floods in Sylhet. Although Pori Moni was supposed to act in the film, due to the Narcotics Act case filed against her in 2021 and her pregnancy after marriage the following year, Chayanika discussed with her and left her out of the casting. Chayanika wanted to cast Mahfuz Ahmed in her previous film. However, despite not being able to cast her in Bishwoshundori, she was able to cast him in this film. On the other hand, Shobnom Bubly was cast on the recommendation of people as she was suitable with the plot of the film and considering her dedication to acting. To play its protagonist Mona in the film, Mahfuz worked for two and a half years to internalize the character into himself. Its filming started on 2 November 2022 in Sylhet. Filming was scheduled to be completed by December, of which ten days were spent in Sylhet. Along with Sylhet, it was also filmed in Cox's Bazar and St. Martin's Island. Filming was completed in 22 December.

== Music ==
Prohelika

Soundtrack album by Imran Mahmudul, Konal, Kishore, Sharalipi
- Released: 2023
- Genre: Film soundtrack
- Language: Bengali
- Producer: Emon Saha

Emon Saha chronology
Tungiparar Miya Bhai (2022)	Prohelika (2023)	Lal Shari (2023)

Singles from Prohelika
- 1. "Megher Nouka" Released: February 27, 2023; 2. "Hridoy Diye" Released: June 22, 2023; 3. "Bidhur Valobasha" Released: June 30, 2023

The first song of this film is "Megher Nouka" which was announced in February 2023 at a press the meet at Dhaka Club to mark the first release. The song is sung by Imran Mahmudul and Konal with lyrics by Asif Iqbal. Filming of its music video happened in Cox's Bazar on 22 December 2022. The music video of its second song in the voice of Kishore and Swarlipi gained popularity among people after it was uploaded on YouTube on June 22 of the same year. The music video titled "Hridoy Dye" featured Nasir Uddin Khan in a different look which created a positive response among the audience.

Track listing
No.	Title	Lyrics	Music	Singer(s)	Length
1.	"Megher Nouka"	Asif Iqbal	Imran Mahmudul	Imran Mahmudul and Konal	5:15
2.	"Hridoy Diye"	Asif Iqbal	Kishore Das	Kishore, Sharalipi	3:15
3.	"Bidhur Valobasha"	Jamal Hossain	Akash Mahmud	Akash Mahmud, Shithi Saha	2:56

== Release ==
In February 2023, Chayanika Chowdhury announced the release of Prohelika on Eid-ul-Fitr of the same year. On 18 May 2023, with the release of its first poster on Facebook, it was confirmed that it would be released in Eid-ul-Azha (29 June 2022). In 27 June, it was scheduled to release in at least 20 movie theaters in the country. But later it was known that the film is going to be release in 8 theaters. On 7 July 2023 its release increased by 1 movie theater and 6 shows in multiplexes. It was scheduled to release in Australia and New Zealand on 5 August 2023.

== Reception ==
Ahsan Kabir of Bangla Tribune gave 5.5/10 to Prohelika and questioned the incompleteness and contradictions of some parts of the film's story. He also criticized its loud background music which made the dialogues difficult to hear in many cases. However, he praised its romantic features and the performances of the actors. Abdullah Al Mamun of Prothom Alo praised its songs, actors' performances and cinematography. However, according to him, it would have been better to slow down the pace of the scenes. Shaniz Chowdhury of The Daily Star wrote "The plot had more potential than what was realized. Regardless, it's still a movie that can be entertaining and thrilling to watch".
