= Aam Kathaler Chhuti =

2023 Bangladeshi film

- Poster
- Directed by: Mohammad Nuruzzaman
- Written by: Mohammad Nuruzzaman
- Screenplay by: Mohammad Nuruzzaman
- Story by: Shorif Uddin Shobuj
- Based on: Mainna Bhai Bolla Rashi by Shorif Uddin Shobuj
- Produced by: Mohammad Nuruzzaman
- Starring: Leon Ahmed; Zubair; Arif; Halima; Tanzil; Fatima; Kamruzzaman Kamrul; Abdul Hamid
- Cinematography: Mohammad Nuruzzaman; Maq Sabbir
- Edited by: Mohammad Nuruzzaman
- Music by: Mohammad Nuruzzaman
- Production company: Cinemaker
- Release date: 18 August 2023
- Country: Bangladesh
- Language: Bengali

Aam Kathaler Chhuti (Bengali: আম কাঁঠালের ছুটি; transl. The Mango-Jackfruit Vacation) is a 2023 Bengali-language Bangladeshi children's film. The production, direction, screenplay, dialogue writing, cinematography, editing and sound design were by Mohammad Nuruzzaman. It is based on the short story Mainna Bhai Balla Rashi by Shorif Uddin Shobuj. This film is made in the atmosphere of the past life as the children and teenagers passed their childhood and adolescence in the seventies, eighties and mid-nineties. The international version of the film is titled Summer Holiday.

== Story ==
This full-length feature film tells the story of how an outcast eight-year-old city boy discovers a new world, finds friendship and a taste for adventure when he visits the village on a summer vacation.

== Cast ==
- Leon Ahmed as Mainna
- Zubair
- Arif
- Halima
- Tanzil
- Fatima
- Kamruzzaman Kamrul
- Abdul Hamid

== Production ==
Produced by Cinemaker, the production work has been going on for seven years. Filming was done on locations spread over twenty-five-thirty kilometers near Harbaid in Gazipur with a small technical unit and a group of amateur actors.

== Release ==
It was released on 18 August 2023, on the same day as the Bangladesh War of Independence film 1971 Shei Shob Din. It was released in five theaters in the country.

=== Premiere ===
The premiere was held on 6 August 2023 at Bangladesh Shilpakala Academy's national gallery auditorium.

This Bangladeshi film has been officially selected to participate in the International Feature Film Competition section of the UBA International Film Festival to be held in Buenos Aires, Argentina, from 25 to 30 July 2023.

Aam Kathaler Chhuti had its international premiere at the Jagja Asian Film Festival, held in Jakarta, Indonesia, from 26 November to 3 December 2022, with another screening in the Asian Perspective section. The festival committee and the audience also appreciated the film.

== Awards ==
The film received the Special Jury Award at the Cheboksary International Film Festival in Russia last 26 May 2023. In 2024, the film received Meril-Prothom Alo Awards - 2023 in three categories.

Year	Awards	Category	Receiver	Results	Ref.
2023	Special Jury Award at Cheboksary International Film Festival	Best Film	—N/a	Won	
2024	Meril-Prothom Alo Awards - 2023	Best Film	—N/a	Nominated	
2024	Meril-Prothom Alo Awards - 2023	Best Film Director	Mohammad Nuruzzaman	Nominated	
2024	Meril-Prothom Alo Awards - 2023	Best Child Artist	MD Lyon	Nominated	
2026	Bangladesh National Film Awards 2023	Best Child Artist	MD Lyon	Won	
2026	Bangladesh National Film Awards 2023	Child Artist Special	Arif Hasan and Anaira Khan	Won	
