= Jason Gorber =

Canadian film critic

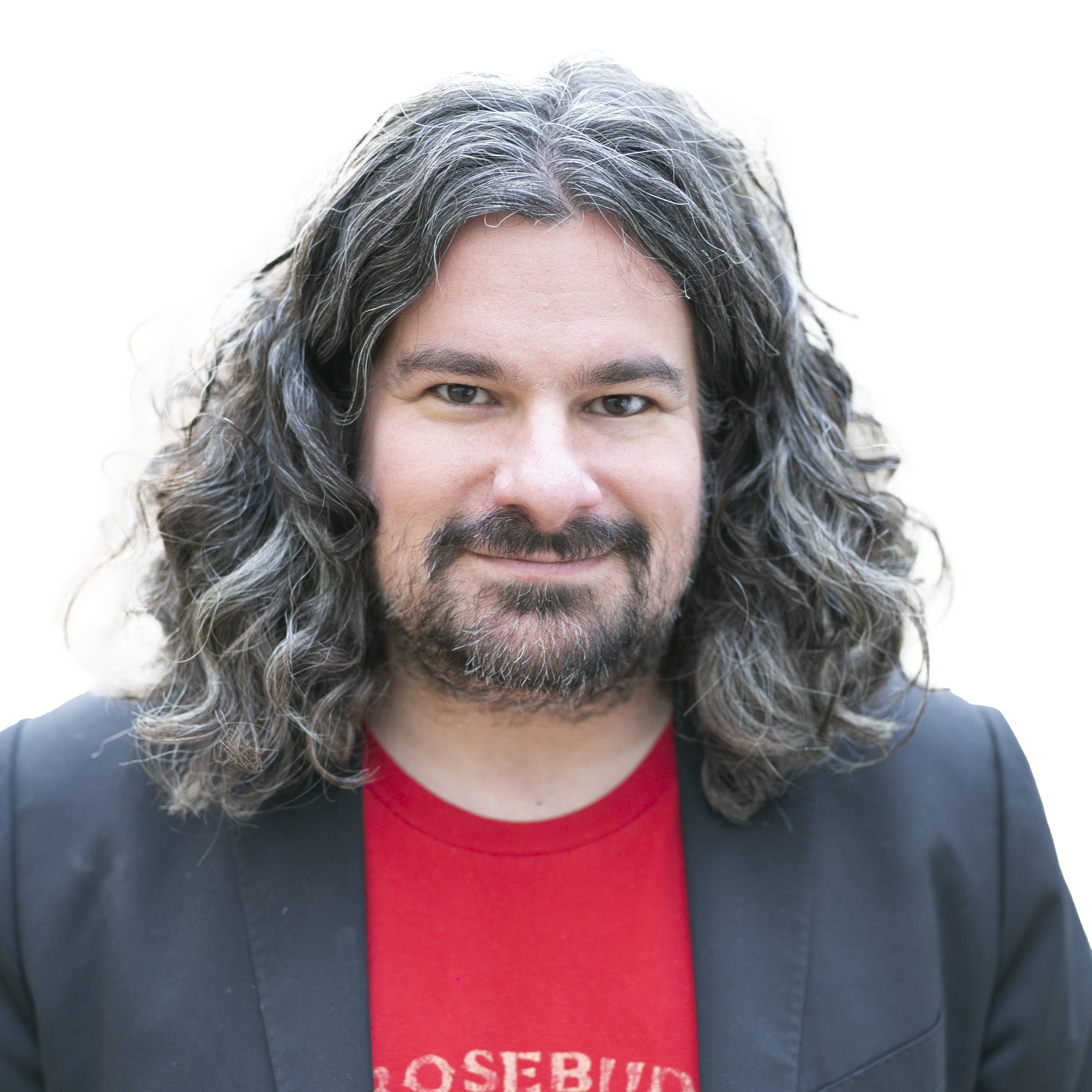
Jason Gorber in 2020

Jason Gorber is a Canadian film critic and interviewer based in Toronto.

Gorber holds a Master of Arts degree in Philosophy with a focus on film theory and criticism. He is the film columnist for CBC Radio One's Metro Morning programme, where he has a weekly review segment on Friday mornings. He is a member of the Toronto Film Critics Association, the Online Film Critics Society, and the Critics Choice Association, and has been a jury member for festivals including the Reykjavík International Film Festival, the Munich International Film Festival, the RiverRun International Film Festival, TIFF Canada's Top Ten, Reel Asian, the Calgary Underground Film Festival, and the Windsor International Film Festival, among others. He has covered festivals including Sundance, the Berlinale, and Hot Docs, and has interviewed filmmakers including Werner Herzog and Asif Kapadia.

He is the editor-in-chief and chief critic at That Shelf and a regular contributor for several outlets, including POV Magazine, RogerEbert.com, Collider, The A.V. Club, Paste Magazine, and CBC Radio's q program. He was previously a featured reviewer for the CTV News Channel and has written for the Toronto Star, The Globe and Mail, the National Post, Esquire.com, ScreenAnarchy (formerly Twitch Film), IndieWire, Slashfilm, and many other print and online outlets. As of December 2024, he has forty-five reviews listed on Metacritic (where he has assigned scores of 100/100 to two films, respectively The French Dispatch and Anora).

In early 2013, he wrote a piece in the Toronto Star describing his preferred seating locations at many of Toronto's major cinemas. Gorber contends that finding a proper seat is "nearly as important as the film itself" for viewers interested in a full cinematic experience, describing the search as "part art, part science" for a committed few. He has also written reviews of specialty cinemas, including a profile of the Alamo Drafthouse in Austin, Texas.

Gorber has been described by the Canadian Broadcasting Corporation as a Star Wars aficionado. After Disney's announcement in late 2012 of plans to create Star Wars Episode VII (Star Wars: The Force Awakens), he tweeted, "I will be 43 years old in 2015, and yet I will still be lining up. This is what I do. So, who's with me in line?"
