= Friday (2023 film) =

- Promotional poster
- ফ্রাইডে
- Directed by: Raihan Rafi
- Based on: True story
- Starring: Toma Mirza; Nasir Uddin Khan; Farzana Chobi; Mohammad Bari; Nilanjana Nil; Monir Ahmed Shakeel; Mayeha Ahmed Aditi
- Distributed by: Binge
- Release date: 3 March 2023
- Country: Bangladesh
- Language: Bengali

Friday is a 2023 Bengali thriller film directed by Raihan Rafi. It starring Toma Mirza and Nasir Uddin Khan in the lead roles.

== Cast ==
- Toma Mirza as Muna
- Nasir Uddin Khan as Pokat
- Farzana Chobi as Maa
- Mohammad Bari as Baba
- Nilanjana Nil as Mahi
- Monir Ahmed Shakeel as Bariwala
- Mayeha Ahmed Aditi as Khuku
- Shahriar Nazim Joy as police officer (special appearance)

== Release ==
The film was released on 3 March 2023.

== Controversy ==
The film's poster was found to be plagiarised from Parasite and House of Secrets: The Burari Deaths.
