= Taqdeer (2020 TV series) =

Bangladeshi television series

- Official Poster
- Genre: Crime Thriller
- Created by: Syed Ahmed Shawki
- Written by: Syed Ahmed Shawki; Neamoth Ullah Masum
- Directed by: Syed Ahmed Shawki
- Starring: Chanchal Chowdhury; Sanjida Preeti; Manoj Pramanik; Shohel Mondol; Partha Barua
- Country of origin: Bangladesh
- Original language: Bengali
- No. of seasons: 1
- No. of episodes: 8

Production
- Production companies: Film Noir; Film Syndicate

Original release
- Network: Hoichoi
- Release: 18 December 2020

Taqdeer (Bengali: তাকদীর) is a thriller television series directed by Syed Ahmed Shawki, started streaming on the Bengali OTT platform hoichoi from 18 December 2020. Hoichoi announced their upcoming twenty-five web series, Taqdeer is one of them, Based on Bangladesh, the series features Chanchal Chowdhury, Manoj Pramanik, Sanjida Preeti and Shohel Mondol in the lead roles. The series is officially remade in India in the Telugu language as Dayaa.

== Plot ==
The plot of the series revolves arounds a story of a freezer van driver in Dhaka named Taqdeer (played by Chanchal Chowdhury) whose whole life turns upside down when he finds a dead body inside his van. A trail of chaotic events thereby follows which pushes Taqdeer and his best friend Montu (played by Shohel Mondol) into bigger difficulties.

== Cast ==
- Chanchal Chowdhury as Taqdeer
- Sanjida Preeti as Afsana Anjum
- Rikita Nandini Shimu as Josna
- Manoj Pramanik as Rana
- Shohel Mondol as Montu
- Partha Barua as Hitman
- Mir Rabbi as Shehzan Chowdhury
- Mahfuz Munna as Shohag
- Ezaz Bari as Nawab Shaheb
- Sazzad Saju as Sakib
- Nafis Ahmed as Sizar
- Shahriar Ferdous Sajib as Alal, DB-1
- Tamzid Tonmoy as Young Taqdeer
- Al Rafiul Islam Ratul as Young Montu
- Tanzim Saiyara Totini as Anika
- Intekhab Dinar as Saymon Chairman (Special Appearance)
- Nasir Uddin Khan as Dilip

== Season 1 (2020) ==
On 6 December 2020, hoichoi released the official trailer of the web series, which created a buzz among the audience of India and Bangladesh. On 18 December 2020, hoichoi released all eight episodes of the series.

== Episodes ==
| No. | Title | Directed by | Original release date |
|---|---|---|---|
| 1 | "Rashatal (The abyss)" | Syed Ahmed Shawki | 18 December 2020 |
| 2 | "Raadbadal (Change of opinion)" | Syed Ahmed Shawki | 18 December 2020 |
| 3 | "Ranakhetra (Battlefield)" | Syed Ahmed Shawki | 18 December 2020 |
| 4 | "Gandham (The smell)" | Syed Ahmed Shawki | 18 December 2020 |
| 5 | "Barafkal (Ice Factory)" | Syed Ahmed Shawki | 18 December 2020 |
| 6 | "Barkhelap (Breakdown)" | Syed Ahmed Shawki | 18 December 2020 |
| 7 | "Prayeshchitto (Atonement)" | Syed Ahmed Shawki | 18 December 2020 |
| 8 | "Pulsirat (Pulsirat)" | Syed Ahmed Shawki | 18 December 2020 |

== Awards ==
| Award Title | Category | Awardee | Result | Ref |
|---|---|---|---|---|
| Hoichoi Awards | Breakthrough Performance of the Year | Chanchal Chowdhury | Won | |
| Blender's Choice–The Daily Star Awards | Best male actor (popular category) | Chanchal Chowdhury | Won | |
| Blender's Choice–The Daily Star Awards | Best Supporting Actor (popular category) | Shohel Mondol | Won | |
| Blender's Choice–The Daily Star Awards | Best Cinematographer (popular category) | Barkat Hossain Polash | Won | |
| Blender's Choice–The Daily Star Awards | Best Drama/Series (popular category) | | Won | |
| Blender's Choice–The Daily Star Awards | Best Costume (popular category) | Edila Farid Turin | Won | |

== See also ==
- Unoloukik
- Mohanagar
- Ladies & Gentleman
- August 14
