= RTV (Bangladeshi TV channel) =

Bangladeshi television channel

- Country: Bangladesh
- Broadcast area: Nationwide; Worldwide
- Headquarters: BSEC Building, Kawran Bazar, Dhaka

Programming
- Language: Bengali
- Picture format: 4K HDTV

Ownership
- Owner: 2005–2007: International Television Channel Ltd.; 2007–present: Bengal Media Corporation
- Key people: Syed Ashik Rahman (CEO)

History
- Launched: 26 December 2005; 20 years ago

Links
- Website: www.rtvonline.com rtvbd.tv

YouTube information
- Channel: RTV News
- Subscribers: 5.2 million
- Last updated: 11 December 2023

RTV (Bengali: আরটিভি) is a Bangladeshi Bengali-language satellite and cable television channel owned by Bengal Media Corporation, previously known as National Television Limited. It is headquartered in the BSEC Building in Kawran Bazar, Dhaka. RTV began broadcasting on 26 December 2005 as a sister channel of NTV, and primarily airs entertainment and news programming.

== History ==
In 2002, Mosaddek Ali Falu applied for a broadcasting license of RTV. According to Falu, the channel's chairman, the 'R' comes from his daughter's name, Roza Ali. The channel commenced test broadcasts on 1 December 2005 and officially began transmissions on 26 December that year. Although he was the chairman of RTV, majority stakes in the channel were held by the Jubo Karmashangsthan Society, also known as Jubok.

The Jubok initially considered selling its stakes, but this was retracted following Falu's arrest on 5 February 2007. RTV was ultimately sold to Bengal Media Corporation during that time, although there were allegations regarding a state intelligence agency being involved in the transfer. On 26 February, a fire broke out at the BSEC building, causing over 100 injuries. As a result, both RTV and its sister, along with the unrelated Islamic TV, were temporarily taken off air. All three channels resumed broadcasting after some time.

RTV aired TV Southasia's South Asian Superstar from December 2008. In 2011, RTV began handing out the RTV Star Awards. RTV was available for streaming on phones through Teletalk's 3G services in October 2012. For six days starting from 6 September 2014, RTV aired six films starring deceased actor Salman Shah, marking his death anniversary. On 31 October 2014, as a result of another fire at the BSEC Building, both RTV and its sister once again went off the air temporarily, but resumed transmissions over time.

On 7 February 2015, an IPTV channel by the name of "RTV Music" began transmissions, but was later shut down by the Bangladesh Telecommunication Regulatory Commission in 2021 after being accused of broadcasting illegally without a valid license. On 6 August 2015, RTV began broadcasting in Australia. In November 2015, RTV was among the channels asked by the information ministry about smoking scenes found in their television series. On 12 January 2017, Deutsche Welle's Bengali language science and technology television series, Onneshon, which was formerly broadcast on Ekushey Television, began airing on RTV. In April 2018, Amitabh Reza Chowdhury's directorial debut feature film Aynabaji had its world premiere on RTV.

Chinese animated series Boonie Bears debuted on RTV in early 2020. RTV launched its own video-on-demand service called RTV Plus on 24 May 2020. According to TRP reports during Eid al-Fitr in 2020, RTV was ranked highest among most watched television channels in Bangladesh, with Deepto TV being ranked second. In September 2020, RTV organized a new contest titled Torun Nirmatar Notun Golpo, in an attempt to find young directors. Dramas directed by them were subsequently broadcast on the channel.

On 2 October 2021, the channel's music award show RTV Music Award debuted. On 23 November 2021, the musical reality television series for young artists, Young Star premiered on RTV. On 15 February 2022, RTV began airing the popular Japanese drama Asa ga Kita. In August 2022, RTV won the Best YouTube Channel Strategy Award at the CMO Asia Awards in Singapore, as a part of the Asia Excellence Awards 2022. Apart from this, Syed Ashik Rahman, the channel's CEO, won the Best Creative Genius Award.

== Programming ==
RTV is a mixed entertainment television channel and therefore its programming line is diversified, consisting of dramas, news, music, and infotainment. It also holds two award shows, RTV Star Award and RTV Music Award.

=== List of programming ===
- Alashpur
- Alta Sundori
- Asa ga Kita
- Ashtadhatu
- Bishayti Paribarik
- Boonie Bears
- Boyra Poribar
- Cheating Master
- Cinderella's Stepsister
- Comedy Club
- Ei Raat Tomar Amar
- FDC
- Golmaal
- Jhamela Unlimited
- Meyeti Ekhon Kothay Jabey
- Mind Latif
- Music Station
- Noashal
- Onneshon
- Ordhek Shotto
- RTV Music Award
- RTV Star Award
- Rupar Mudra
- Semi Corporate
- Shanti Malam 10 Taka
- South Asian Superstar
- Team West Indies
- The Village Engineer
- Village Hottogol
- Young Star

== Related services ==
Service	Description
RTV Music (Bengali: আরটিভি মিউজিক)	An IPTV service dedicated to music content.
RTV Plus (Bengali: আরটিভি প্লাস)	The subscription video-on-demand platform of RTV, launched on 24 May 2020. Many types of content, such as dramas, movies, music, and talk shows, can be streamed on the service.

== See also ==
- List of television stations in Bangladesh
