= Mostafa Anwar (director) =

Bangladeshi film director

Mostofa Anwar (born 1938–12 May 2015) was a Bangladeshi director of the 1980s who made films such as Abujh Hridoy, Kajal Lata, Ankhi Milan, Kashem Malar Prem, Pushpamala, Samarpan, Banglar Ma, Asroy, and Fashi. Anwar worked with the actors Razzaq, Alamgir, Zafor Iqbal, Suchorita, Ilias Kanchan and Bobita.

He was born in Jamalpur District, and joined the Pakistan Air Force (PAF) but soon left to work in the film industry. Beginning as an actor, he became assistant filmmaker to Zahir Raihan, before later working with Pherari, directing around 15 films.

Several playback songs used in his films were "Tumi Amar Jiban" (Abujh Hridoy), "Amar Garur Garitey Bou Sajiye" (Ankhi Milon), and "Ei Raat Dakey Oi Chand Dakey Ei Tomay Amay" (Kajol Lata).

He died on 12 May 2015 from a cerebral hemorrhage. After his death Ilias Kanchan said, "the country’s film industry failed to recognize his talent," his longtime assistant Director Bazlur Rahman said, "he lived in self-imposed obscurity for many years and died silently."

== Abujh Hridoy ==
Abujh Hridoy (English: Freaky Mind) (Bengali: অবুঝ হৃদয়) is a 1989 Bangladeshi film starring Zafor Iqbal, Bobita and Champa opposite him.

The film depicts a love triangle of two women and a man. Both the women (Bobita and Champa) love the same man (Zafar Iqbal) and they are best friends also. So, they try to sacrifice their love for each other. But the man finally chooses Bobita. The film contains the song "Dujon Dujonar Koto Je Apon" which copies the "La La La" tune from the 1985 song "Saagar Kinare" from Saagar film, composed by Rahul Dev Burman.
