= Konal =

Bangladeshi singer

Somnur Monir Konal
- কোনাল
- Born: Somnur Monir Konal; 28 January 1987 (age 39); Dhaka, Bangladesh
- Education: BRAC University (MSc Early Childhood Development) University of Liberal Arts Bangladesh ( Media Studies and Journalism)
- Occupation: Singer
- Years active: 2009–present
- Notable work: Priyotoma
- Spouses: Monzur Kader Ziya
- Awards: Bangladesh National Film Award
- Website: www.smkonal.com

Somnur Monir Konal is a Bangladeshi singer and television host who is best known as a playback singer for Bangladeshi films. She debuted in the entertainment industry by winning the musical television reality show Channel i Shera Kontho in 2009. Since then she has recorded songs for dozens of films, hosted various television shows, and judged the 2019 edition of children's musical reality show Ganer Raja. As of 2022, she has sung for films with more than 300 songs.

Konal won Bangladesh National Film Award for Best Female Playback Singer for her song "Bhalobashar Manush Tumi" in the film Bir (2020). Besides, she won the Symphony-Channel i Music Award in the category Best Playback Singer for their duet '"Jotodin Dhore Bachi"' in the film Ochena Hridoy (2015) and Bharat Bangladesh Film Award in 2019 in the category Best Playback Singer Female Bangladesh.

== Background ==
Konal was born in Dhaka to Saima Monir and Monir Hossain Montu. Montu died from COVID-19 in 2020. She credits her early interest in music to her mother, who was not a professional musician but loved singing. When Konal was 6, her family moved to Kuwait, where her father worked for the Ministry of Interior. In Kuwait, she studied Hindustani classical music under Keka Mukherjee at All India Music Academy. In 2008, after finishing her A-Levels, she moved back to Dhaka, where she lived in her maternal uncle's home. She studied at the University of Liberal Arts Bangladesh at the Department of Media Studies and Journalism.

== Career ==
Konal came to prominence through a national musical talent hunt, the 2009 Channel i Shera Kontho. Award-winning lyricist Kabir Bakul and folk singer Nadira Begum judged her audition. The competition started in May, and she was crowned champion in December, from a field of 92,000 contestants.

Over the next several years she was a playback singer for more than a dozen films, and hosted television shows for Channel i, including the 2012 edition of Shera Kontho. She also had a cameo role as a radio jockey in the 2012 film Lal Tip, and modeled in several television commercials for Airtel in September 2011. Also in 2011, she enrolled at University of Liberal Arts Bangladesh in the Media Studies and Journalism Department.

Her first solo album, Konal's Jaadu, was released in May 2012. It contains seven original Bengali-language tracks by noted composers and a cover of the song "Bangla Desh" in tribute to George Harrison. Her playback work in late 2015 and early 2016 included singing with Kanak Champa in the film Apon Manush, the song "Tomar Adhare, Tomar Anginate" with Andrew Kishore in film Bhalobasapur, and songs in films Rajneeti, Meghkanya, Premer Ki Sadh Ache Bol and Moner Raja. In May 2016, she and Belal Khan shared the Symphony-Channel i Music Award in the category best playback singer for their duet "Jotodin Dhore Bachi" in the 2015 film Ochena Hridoy.

In October 2017, she recorded the song "Ma Tomar Anchol Kothay" with Tanvir Tareq for the 2019 film Maya: The Lost Mother. She and Bappa Mazumder recorded the title song for the film Jannat in February 2018. She also voiced the title song of the 2019 film Jodi Ekdin with Tahsan Khan.

Konal and Imran Mahmudul, who was first runner up on the 2008 edition of Channel i Shera Kontho, judged the 40-episode 2019 edition of children's musical reality show Ganer Raja. Later that year she recorded a duet with Lincon in the party song "Agun Lagailo" for the film Password, starring Shakib Khan and Shobnom Bubly, which earned her widespread recognition and she received massive response from audience. She voiced another party song, "Sunny Sunny" for the film Bikkhov.

In 2020, she sang "Tumi Amar Jibon" with Imran Mahmudul for Kazi Hayat's 50th directorial venture Bir, starring Shakib Khan and Shobnom Bubly, for which she won her first National Film Award for Best Playback Singer. In 2023, she sang "O Priyotoma" for the highest grossing Bangladeshi film of all time Priyotoma, with a Akassh composition, starring Shakib Khan and Idhika Paul. It received massive response from audience and crossed over 100 million views on YouTube in just three months. For which she won Bachsas Award for Best Female Playback Singer.

In 2026, she sang "No Chinta Do Furti" for Badiul Alam Khokon directorial venture Tosnos, starring Munna Khan and Bobby Haque.

== Personal life ==
Konal married Monzur Kader Zia, a journalist for Prothom Alo who she had known for three years, on 21 September 2016.

== Awards ==
Year	Award	Category	Album/Song	Results	Ref.
2026	BIFA Awards	Best Singer	"O Jaan"	Won	
2026	Meril-Prothom Alo Awards	Best Singer (female)	"Pori" from the film Prince: Once Upon a Time in Dhaka	Nominated	
