= Joto Kando Kolkatatei =

2025 Indian Bengali film by Anik Dutta

- Announcement poster
- Directed by: Anik Dutta
- Screenplay by: Anik Dutta; Utsav Mukherjee
- Story by: Anik Dutta
- Produced by: Firdausul Hasan; Prabal Halder
- Starring: Abir Chatterjee; Quazi Nawshaba Ahmed
- Cinematography: Indranath Marick
- Edited by: Arghyakamal Mitra
- Music by: Debojyoti Mishra
- Production company: Friends Communication
- Distributed by: PVR Inox Pictures
- Release date: 26 September 2025
- Running time: 127 minutes
- Country: India
- Language: Bengali

Joto Kando Kolkatatei is a 2025 Indian Bengali detective mystery thriller film directed by Anik Dutta. Produced by Firdausul Hasan and Prabal Halder under the banner of Friends Communication, the film stars Abir Chatterjee and Quazi Nawshaba Ahmed in the lead roles. Written by Dutta along with Utsav Mukherjee, it marked Nawshaba's Tollywood debut. This also marked final directional venture of Anik Dutta before his untimely death on 27 May 2026.

The music has been composed by Debojyoti Mishra. Indranath Marick did the cinematography while Arghyakamal Mitra handled the editing. It was released in the theatres on 26 September 2025, on the occasion of Durga Puja 2025, to positive reviews from the critics as well as the audience alike. The film emerged as a box office success.

== Plot ==
Saba (Quazi Nawshaba Ahmed), a young woman from Dhaka, arrives in Kolkata to uncover her ancestral roots through an old photograph of her maternal grandparents, who belong to Kolkata. Her search led her to cross paths with Toposmitro, a.k.a. Topshe (Abir Chatterjee), a private detective who is heavily inspired by Feluda. They embark on a search across various locations in Kolkata, Kurseong, and Darjeeling, solving a trail of riddles and clever puzzles.

== Cast ==
- Abir Chatterjee as Topesh Mitra a.k.a. Topshe
- Quazi Nawshaba Ahmed as Saba
- Roja Paromita Dey as Suzie, an Anglo Indian nightclub singer, Saba's maternal grandmother
- Rik Chattopadhyay as Alok Roychowdhury, Suzie's lover, Saba's maternal grandfather
- Dulal Lahiri as the old man at barrister bari
- Mithu Chakraborty as the old man's wife
- Aparajita Ghosh as their daughter-in-law
- Rajat Ganguly
- Soumya Sengupta
- Anindya Pulak Banerjee

== Production ==
=== Announcement ===
The film was announced with an announcement poster on 24 August 2023. It revealed the title of the film along with the names of the lead cast, the director, editor, cinematographer, art director, costume designer, and music composer. The poster featured many iconic elements of the Kolkata cityscape in the backdrop, including the yellow Ambassador and the heritage Kolkata trams.

=== Development ===
The film's title, Joto Kando Kolkatatei, has an allusion to Satyajit Ray's "Joto Kando Kathmandute". It has multiple references to different Feluda novels written by Satyajit Ray. Initially, the film was named Hemenbabaur Heyali but was later changed to Joto Kando Kolkatatei because "it isn't only about a heyali," as per the director. In an interview, director Anik Dutta said that Joto Kando Kolkatatei is an original story in itself and also serves as a tribute to Satyajit Ray for having the flavour of Ray's Feluda novels.

Dutta had written the script many years ago, but he couldn't start the filming owing to casting and production issues. He got the idea of making this film on Satyajit Ray's centenary year. He named his lead Topshe, because as per him, "It was easier to be Topshe than Feluda. Feluda was too perfect, too sharp. Topshe was the boy who saw, who narrated. He was us." He mentioned that the character is inspired by, but is not the actual, Topshe from the Feluda series.

The director added in an interview that when he thought about writing a story, keeping the character of Topshe in the center, he wanted to mold the character of Topshe from Satyajit Ray's Feluda novels in a new way, but he couldn't write a Feluda script owing to copyright issues. Later, he spoke with Satyajit Ray's son, Sandip Ray, regarding the permission and copyright infringement. Receiving a green signal, he sent the partially completed script to producer Firdausal Hasan, who insisted he carry on and complete the story.

=== Casting ===
Abir Chatterjee was cast as the male lead of the film in 2022. Madhumita Sarcar was initially cast as the female lead of the film, but she was later replaced by Quazi Nawshaba Ahmed, owing to Sircar's non-availability on the filming dates allotted. This film marked the Tollywood debut for Nawshaba.

Director Anik Dutta saw some open letters that Nawshaba used to write in her father's memory during the end of 2022 on Facebook. Dutta made her the first informal offer via commenting under one of the open letters she has posted on Facebook. In an interview, she said that she didn't know if the "Anik Dutta" who had offered her a role under her Facebook post was genuine or not. Later her friends told her that it's the director himself and not anyone fake. She added that the director had sent her a part of the script and asked her to record and send it to him. This online audition went on for weeks as Dutta used to send her script snippets and she continued to send her audition clips to him. After three months, she was informed that she had been selected for the film.

=== Pre-production ===
In the "Nightclub Song", to recreate the authentic nightclub culture of the city and the lifestyle of the elite class of the 60s era, the director and his team—costume designer Suchismita Dasgupta and art director Ananda Adya—relied on old photographs from the 60s era shared by the Trincas owner and anecdotes that he shared with them, which he had heard from his forefathers. To suit the dressing of that era, the men were dressed in three-piece suits with bow ties, and the females were dressed in georgettes and chiffons with either pearl or diamond necklaces.

The director mentioned in an interview "Apart from costumes, furniture and other light and décor pieces, appropriate crockery, cutlery, musical instruments, and many more accessories had to be procured to generate the correct ambience." The director also added "I constantly balance the expenses with the required effect so that it didn’t turn out looking tacky or fake." Suchismita Dasgupta mentioned in an interview "We have tried to follow the fashion trend from that time. We have taken references of Bengali and English movies from that time. Roja’s dress and gloves were bought at a vintage store in Oxford. We used silk saris and long and midi dresses for the female crowd, while the men wore suits or trousers and dinner jackets. Paroma Banerjee was kind enough to lend us saris from her brand Kalakriti, as her signature print saris are very retro in nature, and went perfectly with the scene."

=== Filming ===
The first scene of the film was shot for the "Nightclub Song" in September 2023, in which the director tried to recreate the Park Street of 60's Calcutta. The song was shot in "Trincas", which is one of the oldest colonial-era restaurants in Calcutta. The schedule at Trincas started at midnight and was wrapped up at 8 am the next morning. Roja Paromita Dey shared her experience about how she had to repeat her steps every time for being in the background when close-up shots of cigar smoke or wine being poured in a glass were being taken. Roja also said that she has choreographed the song herself.

The film is based in the present day but occasionally goes back to the 1960s while solving the cues. The major part of the shooting has been done in Kolkata, while some scenes have been shot in Darjeeling and Kurseong in North Bengal. Due to his poor health, the director missed the outdoor shooting schedules in Darjeeling in November. He also missed a few schedules in Kolkata. But the executive producer, Saptarshi Majumder, senior assistant director, and cinematographer, managed to complete the schedule, avoiding any wastage of the available dates. Dutta was in touch with his team, advising them and solving any issues they faced during the shoot.

In Kolkata, the filming was done across multiple locations, including an old house in Beleghata, which is locally known as the "Barrister bari", and St. John's Church in Dalhousie. Scenes were also filmed at "The Russell Exchange", an old antique shop, the "Bourne & Shepherd" and the "Calcutta and Tribe Café". The director said that he had planned to shoot a few scenes in Bow Barracks, but owing to some unforeseen circumstances, they had to film the scene in a studio. In Kurseong, most of the filming was done in and around a dilapidated church. An infirmary and charitable hospital was recreated at the Mount Hermon School in Darjeeling. A few scenes have also been filmed at the Darjeeling Mall and Glenary's. A pivotal sequence was shot in the tea gardens of Gidda Hills. The entire filming was completed within a month.

=== Post production ===
The post production and editing work started in early December 2023. Dutta's frequent collaborator Arghyakamal Mitra handled the editing. On 30 August 2025, Abir completed his patch dubbing for the film.

As per the storyline, since the character belongs to Dhaka, the director required an actress who could speak in the "Bangal" accent. But after completing the filming, Nawshaba couldn't come back to India owing to visa issues and hence couldn't complete the last part of her dubbing. The remaining portion of her dubbing was completed by Roja Paromita Dey. The director chose Paromita to dub for Nawshaba's character after he got to know that Paromita has her ancestral roots in Bangladesh and she is capable of speaking the Bangladeshi dialect.

== Soundtrack ==
Joto Kando Kolkatatei

Soundtrack album by Debojyoti Mishra
- Released: 2025
- Studio: Jonz’s Audio
- Genre: Film soundtrack
- Length: 11:49
- Language: Bengali

The music of the film has been composed by Debojyoti Mishra. The lyrics have been penned by Rangan Chakraborty, Aparajita Barai, Anik Dutta and Amrita Chattopadhyay.

The first song "Joto Kando Kolkatatei Title Track" was released on 17 August 2025. It has a Mozart composition blend with original elements to avoid copyright issues. The second single "Nightclub Song" was dropped on 22 August 2025. The third song "Rooftop Song" was released on 3 September 2025. The singers Abhijit Barman (Pota) and Mousumi Datta are present on-screen, singing this song at an event in the film. The fourth song "Mountain Song" was released on 17 September 2025.

Track listing
| No. | Title | Lyrics | Singer(s) | Length |
|---|---|---|---|---|
| 1. | "Joto Kando Kolkatatei Title Track" | Rangan Chakraborty | Upal Sengupta, Anindya Chatterjee | 3:09 |
| 2. | "Nightclub Song" | Aparajita Barai | Tanya Sen | 1:57 |
| 3. | "Rooftop Song" | Rangan Chakraborty | Abhijit Barman (Pota), Mousumi Datta | 3:44 |
| 4. | "Mountain Song" | Anik Dutta, Amrita Chattopadhyay | Arko Mukhaerjee | 2:59 |
| Total length: | | | | 11:49 |

== Marketing ==
The teaser was released on 7 August 2025. The teaser displayed that although the film is based in the present, it often reiterates the old Calcutta nostalgia, delving into the 60s while solving the cues.

The trailer was released on 10 September 2025. The trailer launch event was held at the PVR INOX in South City Mall, Kolkata. The event was hosted by Pratim D. Gupta. Abir Chatterjee was absent at the event owing to his contract with Windows Production. Producer said "I requested Abir to be present at the trailer launch event. But he didn't come. I will invite him in the future events too. The remaining is up to him." Director added that he asked Abir if coming to the trailer launch is also a part of "promotional activities" but he alleged that Abir didn't reply him.

The "Nightclub Song" release event was held at the Trincas, the same place where the song sequence was filmed. It displayed the jazz culture prominent in 60s Calcutta. The original singer and composer of the song, Tanya Sen and Debojyoti Mishra respectively, sang the song. Roja Paromita Dey and Rik Chatterjee impersonated their characters from the film and performed their dance from the eponymous song sequence in the film.

The premiere took place on 25 September 2025 in the absence of Abir Chatterjee. The special screening of the film was held on 18 October 2025. Abir was present at the event. Before the screening started, the director suddenly faced difficulty in breathing. After taking inhaler and acute rest, he recovered and joined the screening midway.

== Release ==
=== Theatrical ===
The filming started in September 2023. Initially, the post production was scheduled to end by July 2024 and the film was planned to release in Durga Puja 2024. But upon Abir's request, the producer delayed its release. But in 2025, when the producer wanted to release it during the Durga Puja, Abir once again requested him to delay its release since he would not be able to be a part of the promotions due to his contract signed with Windows Productions.

The film was finally released on 26 September 2025 on the occasion of Durga Puja. It clashed with the simultaneous Bengali releases Raghu Dakat, Raktabeej 2 and Devi Chowdhurani.

=== Home media ===
Joto Kando Kolkatatei had its OTT premiere on ZEE5 Bangla on 9th January 2026.

== Reception ==
=== Critical reception ===
Agnivo Niyogi of The Telegraph reviewed he film and wrote "Joto Kando Kolkatatei is Dutta’s most explicit homage to Ray, presented under the guise of a detective mystery. The end product, however, is less of a gripping thriller and more of an indulgent nostalgia piece that often feels flat." He mentioned although the film has a Feluda charm on papers, real tension is not visible in the execution. He criticized the easily predictable twists, the lack of genuine suspense and slow pace of the film. He praised Abir's performance but mentioned it to be similar to his role in his other detective films. He additionally praised the cinematography, music and background score which according to him, "helped to rediscover Kolkata and its ancient charms."

Eshna Bhattacharya of the Times of India rated the film 3.5/5 stars and noted "The film is witty but indulgent, affectionate but occasionally clumsy, clever in concept but uneven in execution. Its strengths lie in its atmosphere, performances, music, and its unwavering love for the city. Its weaknesses lie in pacing, predictability, and the occasional implausibility of its central mystery." She praised Abir, Dulal Lahiri, Rik Chatterjee and Paromita Dey's performance besides praising the crisp dialogues. She criticized the easy predictability of the twists, over excessive supporting characters, weak execution of the painting idea and slow pace of the film. But she praised the rejuvenating cinematography, the lively colour palettes and the nostalgic music of the film which she termed as "the soul of the film."

Rahul Majumder of Aajkal reviewed the film and noted "The director has projected the city of Kolkata not as a backdrop, but as a living entity which is the lead character of the film. The film is not only a tribute to Satyajit Ray, but a drawing of the city's history and culture." He praised the "Feluda-stic" dialogues, the mystery, the old Calcutta nostalgia, the lively portrayal of the city, the suspense, the cinematography and the music but bemoaned the pace. He praised the acting of the lead duo as well as the limited screen presence of Dulal Lahiri and Anindya Pulak Banerjee. He also applauded Roja Paromita Dey's dubbing for the character of Saba.

Sandipta Bhanja of Sangbad Pratidin reviewed the film and wrote "The filmmaking clearly depicts a Feluda tone but the storytelling blurs the line between fact and fiction. The film delves into the soul of Calcutta takes us through the ancient nostalgia revolving around the city." Although she bemoaned the dialogues, slow screenplay and the lack of strong acting, she mentioned that the light-hearted tone throughout the film makes amends for the faults. Subhodeep Bandyopadhyay of The Wall rated the film 8/10 stars and opined "Anik Datta has broken the age old palette of Bengali detective films by inculcating a flavor of romance and sensualism in Joto Kando Kolkatatei." He praised the music, cinematography, makeup artists and the performances of the ensemble cast but mentioned that the climax and screenplay could have been more intact.

== Controversy ==
Initially the film was scheduled to release in Durga Puja 2024. But producer Firdausal Hasan delayed the release owing to Abir's contract issues. Per reports, Abir had signed a contract with Windows Production, according to which, for three consecutive Durga Pujas (2023-2025) Abir won't be able to work in any other film as a lead that would be released during the Durga Puja. The director put allegations that despite the shooting was completed, Abir didn't complete his dubbing. As a result, they had to delay their film. Producer asked at the press conference "Will I beg to Abir for promotions? Both Raktabeej 2 and Joto Kando Kolkatatei are films of completely different genres. People can choose the film which they love. So why are they suffering from insecurity? Mamata Banerjee has done something so that every Bengali film gets a prime time slot but even after that Abir will not be present at the promotions?"

Abir said "Since it is my film and I am personally attached with this film, I requested the producer to not release it in the Pujas. I will feel bad if my audience gets divided. It was known from last year that Raktabeej 2 will release in this year Puja. But how would I know that JKK will also be released at the same time? I have come to know, that the release of Bohurupi in 2024 has also become a part of the conversation. I got to know from their interview that I had requested them to not release this film in 2024 since Bohurupi was being released! Was JKK even ready to be released last year? I completed its dubbing in 2025 only. I asked them to sit in a discussion to decide the release date. I hadn't hid anything. On 10th July, I told the producer that I am bound in contract. Please don't release this in the Pujas, I won't be able to participate in the promotions. I just have one question - Why is the 2024 release even coming to the scenario here? Was the film even ready to be released at that time? I came here for dubbing last Saturday - Would I have come if I didn't had any attachment with the film?"

Abir told in an interview to The Times of India "During pujas, I had Karnasubarner Guptodhon in 2022, Raktabeej in 2023 and Bohurupi in 2024. This year, I have a contract for the puja release of Raktabeej 2. When discussions began this year about JKK's release, I already informed Friends Communication about my contract with Windows for the Puja release." The producer said that he expected more professionalism from Abir. In reply, Abir said "Since my work ethics are being questioned, I want to ask, was JKK even ready for the release last Puja? The film's shooting ended in Nov 2023. The dubbing concluded in June this year. I even completed the correction dubbing on Aug 30." He also added that in 2014, 2015 and 2018, two of his films have been simultaneously released in the Pujas and both releases had performed well.

Abir said in an interview to News18 "Everyone knew that Raktabeej 2 is releasing this year. Although an actor can't decide the release date of a film but I don't know how can the producer decide to release another film of the same actor at the same time. Even if I keep the contract aside, no actor would want to divide his audience. If I would have not wanted JKK release, then why would I have done the patch dubbing on Saturday?" He said that on Saturday, during patch dubbing, he came to know about director poor health and had a good conversation with him. But he was surprised to see that even after having a good conversation on the previous day, the producer has called a press conference without informing him. "What kind of courtesy is this?" he asked.

In an interview with The Indian Express, the director said "Abir hasn't directly spoken about his contract with me. I have heard that he can't be a part of the promotions. But didn't knew which promotional activities he can't be a part of. Later I noticed he wasn't posting anything related to the film and didn't even come to the premiere. I asked him why because premiere isn't part of any promotion, but he didn't reply. Since he hasn't publicly disclosed the contract, I have no way than to believe in his words." Director also said "Windows is trying to control the films in which there is Abir, since they can't control the others. They don't want other films to promote themselves. It could be due to their insecurity which arises from continuous success."
