= Jaago (2010 film) =

- Movie poster
- Directed by: Khijir Hayat Khan
- Written by: Khijir Hayat Khan
- Produced by: Adnan Karim
- Starring: Ferdous; Bindu; Arifin Shuvoo; Sharlin Farzana; Tariq Anam Khan; Rawnak Hasan; FS Nayeem; Jatika Jyoti
- Cinematography: Sachi Chowdhury
- Edited by: Samir Ahmed
- Music by: Arnob
- Distributed by: Interspeed
- Release date: 15 January 2010
- Running time: 150 minutes
- Country: Bangladesh
- Language: Bengali

Jaago (Bengali: জাগো; transl. wake up) is a 2010 Bangladeshi sports drama film written and directed by Khijir Hayat Khan. The film features Ferdous and Bindu in lead roles and with supporting Arifin Shuvoo, Sharlin Farzana, Tariq Anam Khan, Rawnak Hasan, FS Nayeem and many more. It claims to be the first Bangladeshi film based entirely on football or any other sports. The story of Jaago is said to be inspired by the Shadhin Bangla football team, who raised funds during the Liberation War (1971) through charity matches and lifted the morale of the freedom fighters.

== Plot ==
Every year, Comilla XI plays friendly football matches against India's Tripura XI. But unfortunately they lose every match over the years. But this year they had a strong team, led by Shamim (Ferdous Ahmed) who is very passionate about football. He, along with local boys run a football academy named Azad Boys. He requests former Shadhin Bangla Football Team member Safu Bhai (Tariq Anam Khan) to coach the team. But he rejects and says football doesn't give you anything. But one day, members of Comilla XI had a road accident. All the players were wounded and some of them died. But the captain of Tripura XI talked dishonourably that it saved their time mentioning they would've won the match very easily. As a result, amateurs of Azad boys Dared to dream and wanted to play a re-match. Regarding their bravery Safu agreed to coach them. They practiced hard and played with real hearts to save the pride of Comilla.

== Cast ==
- Ferdous as Shamim
- Bindu as Maya
- Arifin Shuvoo as Rafi
- Sharlin Farzana as Ruksana Anjuman
- Tariq Anam Khan as coach Saffu
- Rawnak Hasan as Tuhin
- Nusrat Daina as Reshma
- Jashimuddin Palash as Mesba
- Bachchu as Suruz Ali
- Ferdousi Ara Lina as Shamim's mother
- Dicon Noor as Rafi's father
- Jatika Jyoti
- Saraf Ahmed Zibon as Mesba's brother
- Khijir Hayat Khan as Munna

== Awards and nominations ==
Jaago received fifteen nominations and received six awards at the Film Award Bangla 2010 in the following categories: Best Film (Critics' Choice); Best Director (Khijir Hayat Khan); Best Music Director (Arnob); Best Actress (Bindu); Best Playback Singer Male (Kumar Bishwajit for "Jhum Jhum Brishti") and Best Sound Engineer (Bappi Rahman).

== Music ==
The film includes a total of five songs written by Arnob and Anup Mukhopaddhay and rearranged by Arnob. The film features Kumar Bishwajit, Bappa Mazumder, Arnob, Zohad, Audit, Milon Mahmud and others as playback singers.

Jaago

Soundtrack album by Kumar Bishwajit, Bappa Mazumder, Arnob and more
- Released: 2010
- Genre: Feature film soundtrack
- Length: 36:06 min

Track listing
No.	Title	Music	Singer(s)	Length
1.	"Jaago (Version 1)"	Arnob	Arnob, Bappa Mazumder & Zohad	4:46
2.	"Shomoy Churi"	Arnob	Arnob, Milon Mahmud, Audit & Zohad	4:03
3.	"Keno Chole Gele Dure"	Arnob	Srabonti Ali & Arnob	3:17
4.	"Jhum Jhum Jhum Brishti"	Arnob	Kumar Bishwajit & Kona	3:53
5.	"Jaago (slow)"	Arnob	Arnob	2:40
6.	"Pothe Cholte"	Arnob	Rupom	3:41
7.	"Shomoy Churi (Slow)"	Arnob	Arnob	3:58
8.	"Jaago (Version 2)"	Arnob	Audit	5:58
9.	"Jhum Jhum Jhum Brishti (Instrumental)"	Arnob		3:50
Total length:				36:06

== See also ==
- Eito Prem
- Rani Kuthir Baki Itihash
