= Sharlin Farzana =

Bangladeshi model and actress

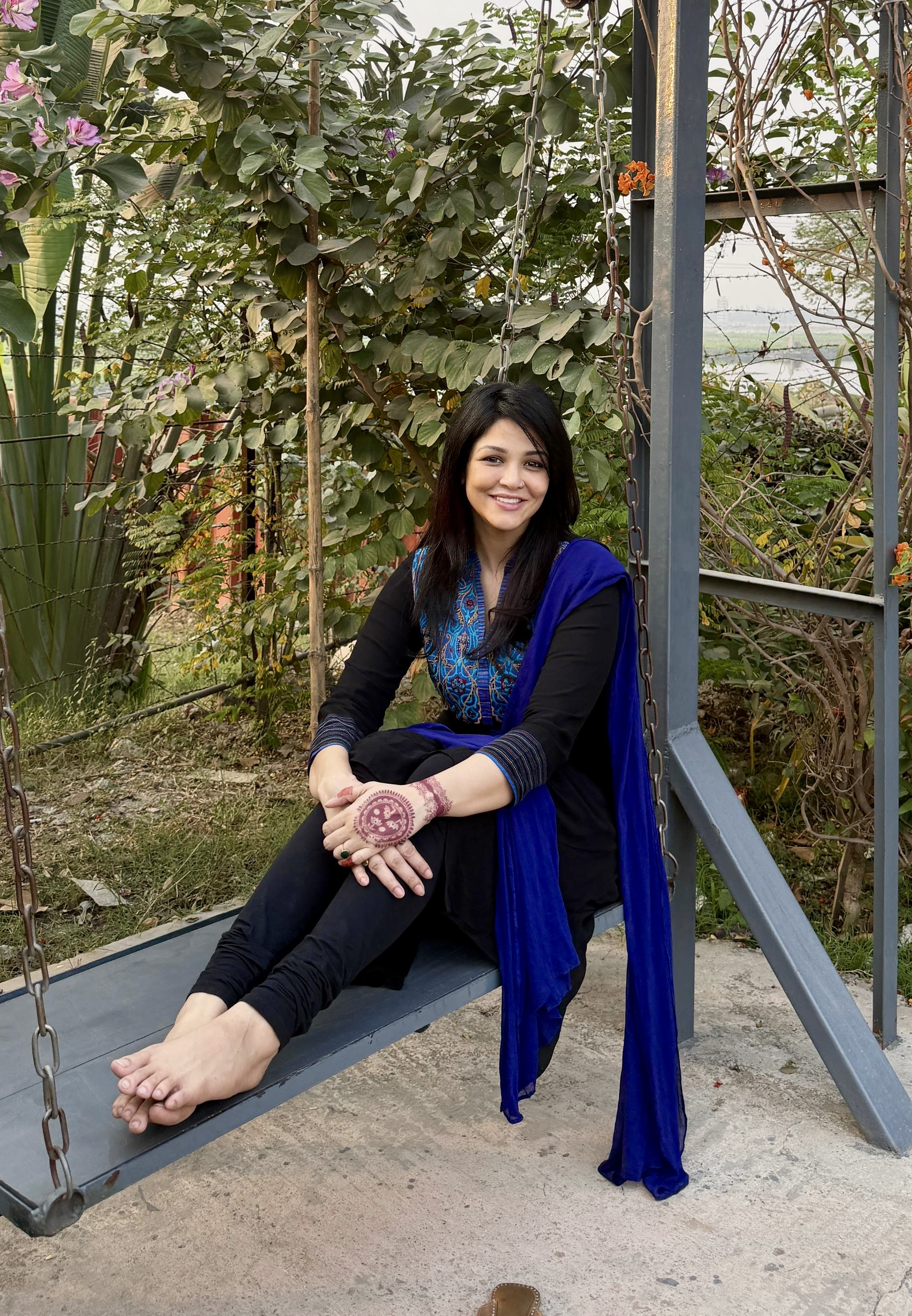
- Born: 1990 (age 35–36); Dhaka, Bangladesh
- Education: L.L.B
- Alma mater: University of London
- Occupations: Actress, Model, Dancer
- Years active: 2008 – Present
- Height: 5 ft 7 in (170 cm)
- Spouse: Ehsanul Haque
- Children: 2
- Parents: Shahjahan Siddique (father); Farida Khan Hena (mother)
- Website: sharlinfarzana.com

Sharlin Farzana (born 1990) is a Bangladeshi model and actress. She was born in Dhaka, Bangladesh.

== Personal life ==
Sharlin has one younger brother. She married Ehsanul Haque on 23 November 2019. She is a mother of a boy who was born in November 2020 and a daughter who was born in December 2022.

== Early life ==
Sharlin Farzana was born on 3 January 1990. She completed her SSC and HSC from Viqarunnisa Noon School and College. She took lessons in classical dancing from Bulbul Lalitakala Academy and also won a certificate for her Katthak performance. She was also enlisted as child artiste in Bangladesh television. At 5th grade in school She stood second in national primary scholarship examinations competing with the students from all across Dhaka. After graduating from Viqarunnisa Noon school she joined the same college.

Sharlin admitted In Shikder Medical College, Dhaka, as her parents always wanted her to be a doctor. But she was passionate about studying law. She studied Bar at law through an external program conducted by the University of London.

== Career ==
In the year 2008 she participated in 'Pantene you got the look' beauty contest. She won the award for 'best look' at the competition. She acted in a movie called Jaago where she played the character of a young journalist named Rukhsana in 2010. Grameenphone and Seylon Tea TVC were her early days works. She acted mainly TV Dramas like - Waada, Too Love You More, The Miser, Bindutei Fera, Hotath Tomar Jonno, Come From Vua Pur, Life and Fiona, Poddopata, Bhalobashar Fanush, J Tumi Horon Koro, Tomar Amar Biye, Tukro Premer Badhon, Megh Bristir Alapon, Meghnil, Bindutei Fera, Too Late Bachelor etc. Sharlin Farzana is Brand Ambassador Drapes, Pantene Pro-V (Present). Sharlin Farzana also acted in a short film 'Saathiya'. She took part in Tariq Anam Khan's Natok theatre group called Nattokendro. Unoponchash Batash is the latest film of Sharlin which is directed by the popular television director, playwright, and musician Masud Hasan Ujjal, The film is produced by Asif Hanif, under Red October's banner.

== Works ==
=== Television drama ===
Year	Drama	Co-Artist	Director	Network
2014	Protidiner Ekdin	Afran Nisho	Dewan Sumsur Rakib	
2014	Hotath Tomar Jonno	Tahsan Khan, Shawon Huq Huq, Ferdousi Lina, Farhana Yesmin Iva, Rishta, Anonya Chowdhury, Oni, Partha Protim Mridha, Adnan	Taneem Rahman Angshu.	
2015	FanPage	Apurba, Mumtaheena Buni Toya, Anondo Khaled, Pronil		Rabbitholebd Entertainment
2016	Life and Fiona	Afran Nisho, Shyamol Maola	Tanim Rahman Ongshu	
2016	Kaktaruar Prem	Apurba, Mou, Apurbo, Siam		
2017	Certificate Ferot	Afran Nisho	K M. Nayem	RTV
2017	Mon Janala	Apurba, Tareen, Monir Khan Shimul, Sharmili Ahmed, Nazrul Islam Razu		NTV
2017	Tomar Amar Biye	Shajal		
2017	Megh Bristir Alapon	Apurba		
2017	Bola Holo Na	Apurba		
2017	Na Bola Shei Diary	Apurba		
2017	Anmone	Apurba		
2017	Bindutei Fera	Apurba		
2017	Tukro Premer Badhan			
2017	Chakro			
2017	Wada	Afran Nisho, Munira Mithu, Basar Bappy, Uzzal Chowdhury, Rakib Rashed	Mehedi Hasan Jony	
2017	Meghnil	Riaz, Ashik Munir, Roya		
2017	Je Tumi Horon Koro	Afran Nisho, Nowshaba, Tahsin	Mahmud Didar	
2017	Bulir Belconi	Mosharraf Korim, Sharlin, Jhuna		
2017	I am Joynal, Come From Vuapur	Sotabdhi Oadud, Romana Swarna, Tutul Chowdhury, Nur A Alam Nayon, Kochi	Rabiul Islam Pradhan	
2017	Das Cabin	Iresh Zaker & Azad Abul Kalam	Masud Hasan Ujjol	
2017	Atpoure Jiboner Gaan	Afran Nisho and Nawshaba		NTV
2017	Tukro Premer Badhon	Afran Nisho, Omer Aziz, Basar Bappy, Birohi Mukther		NTV
2017	Daily Fright Night: Creepy karma	Shajal Noor		GTV
2017	Opekkhar Sesh Dine	Apurba, Sayem, Jhumur, Lamia	Mizanur Rahman Aryan	
2017	Poddopata	Majnun Mizan, F S Nayeem	Nazmul Huda Shapla	Rabbitholebd Entertainment
2017	Nila Kabbo	Tauquir Ahmed, Bonna Mirza, Shahed Shorif Khan, Sharlin Farzana, Bithi Rani Sarkar, Nure Alam Noyon, Obid Rehan,	Tauquir Ahmed	Rabbitholebd Entertainment
2017	Valobasar Sompadokiyo	John Kabir, Ziaul Hasan Kislu, Saira, Siam		NTV
2017	Cover Story	Riaz, Tania, Babu		
2018	Sorry Too	Apurba		
2018	Sei Cheleta	Apurba		
2018	Amar Lekha Tor Kache Prothom Chithi	Afran Nisho, Birohi Moktar	Md. Mehedi Hasan Jony	
2018	Tai Tomar Golpe	Apurba, Momo Ali, Mourita Jui, Durlov Hasan, H M Firoz	Md. Mehedi Hasan Jony	
2018	Sohoj Sorol Cheleta	Afran Nisho, Mili Bashar, Rupom,	Md. Mehedi Hasan Jony	
2018	Stand Up Nadim	Shajal Noor	Sraboni Ferdous	
2018	Ovinoy	Tariq Anam Khan, Hasnat Ripon, Ashuk Bepari, Hindul Ray, Daoud Nour	Rafat Mozumder Rinku	
2018	Ovimani	Irfan Sazzad, Saberi Alam		
2018	Baishe Shrabon	Siam Ahmed, Shely Hasan	Sumon Anowar	
2019	Shunnotay	Afran Nisho	Sanjib Saha Sonju	
2019	Na Bola Sei Diary	Apurba		
2019	The Miser	Apurba, Prema, Monira Mithu	MD. Mehedi Hasan Jony	
2019	Too Late Bachelor	Siam, Jovan, Nadia, Ireen		
2019	Odhikar	Afran Nisho		
2019	Uha Ekti Prem Chhilo	Shajal Noor		NTV
2019	Ochena Megher Shondhane	Afran Nisho		Maasranga TV
2019	Bhalobashar Nilam	Jovan		
2019	Upohar	Afran Nisho		
2019	The Dark Night | Ek Raater Golpo	Jovan, Tamim Mridha, Jhora		
2019	Naphthalene	Afran Nisho	Golam Muktadir	ETV
2019	Crime Report	Apurba		
2020	Dur Theke	Apurba		
2021	The Night Guard	Afran Nisho, Mehedi Hasan Jony / Anik	Md Mehedi Hasan Jony	
2021	Jokhon Boshonto	Afran Nisho, Harun Ur Rashid, Azam Khan, Aparna	Taneem Rahman Angshu	

=== Drama series ===
Year	Drama Series	Co-Artist	Director	Network
2021	Lotakombol	Afran Nisho, Abul Hayat, Ahmed Rubel, Tamalika Karmakar, Fazlul Haque, Nova, Kholilur Rahman Kaderi, Jebunnesa Sobhan Tuntuni, Hindol Ray, Raunak Ripon	Golam Muktadir	

=== Telefilms ===
Year	Telefilm	Co-Artist	Director	Network
2017	Bondhu	Apurba, Jovan, Nadia		GTV, Rabbitholebd Entertainment
2018	Tomai Nea Golpo Hok	Afran Nisho		Maasranga TV
2018	Sumona	Rawnak Hasan	Nazmul Huda Shapla	
2019	Artist Mojnu Kha	Afran Nisho		Maasranga TV
2020	To love You More	Afran Nisho		Maasranga TV

=== Short films ===
- Saathiya

=== Films ===
Year	Films	Role	Director	Notes	Ref.
2010	Jaago	Rukhsana Anjuman	Khijir Hayat Khan		
2020	Unoponchash Batash	Nira	Masud Hasan Ujjal		

=== TVC ===
Year	TVC	Director	Agency
2013	Seylon Tea	Gazi N Ahmed Shubhro	RED dot
2014	Grameen Phone Clear Cut TVC	Ashfaq Bipul	A Half Stop Down
2018	Senora TVC। Husband's Care		AdsofBD

=== Web series ===
Year	Series	Co-Artist	Director
2017	Feluda	Parambrata Chatterjee, Tariq Anam Khan, Riddhi Sen	
2024	Golam Mamun	Ziaul Faruq Apurba, Sabila Nur	Shihab Shaheen
