= List of programmes broadcast by ATN Bangla =

This is the list of all programming currently or has aired on the Bangladeshi satellite and cable television channel ATN Bangla.

== Original programming ==
=== Drama ===
- Amader Nishchintopur
- Bhalobashar Rong
- Bhara Bari Bara Bari
- Crime Patrol
- DB
- Doll's House (2007–2008)
- Family Crisis Reloaded
- Hazar Botrish
- Ghar Jamai
- Jiboner Oligoli
- Jole Bheja Rong
- Jyotsna Kaal
- Karo Kono Neeti Nai
- Maago Tomar Jonno
- Nana Ronger Manush
- Nupur
- Ochena Manush
- Path Jana Nai (2010–2011)
- Prohelika
- Sadek Dafadar
- Satti Tarar Timir
- Shopnomongol
- Shunnotaye
- Smritir Alpona Anki (2020–present)
- Soya Panch Arai Lane
- Syed Barir Bou
- Taratari Barabari
- The Challenger
- Uposhonghar
- Volume ta Koman

=== Children's shows ===
- Openti Bioscope

=== Cooking ===
- Farm Fresh Weekly New Recipe
- Starline Rannaghor

=== Investigative ===
- Prapok

=== Magazine ===
- Golpey Anondey ATN Bangla

=== Musical ===
- ATN Unplugged
- Matir Gaan

=== News ===
- ATN Bangla Shongbad
- Off the Record

=== Reality ===
- Agamir Taroka
- Amra Tomaderi
- South Asian Dance Competition

=== Talk shows ===
- Alaap
- Priyojon
- Sense of Humour

== Acquired programming ==
- Cennet'in Gözyaşları
- Feather Flies to the Sky
- The Lost World
