= Sharey Showlo =

2023 Bangladeshi web series

- Poster
- Genre: Drama; Thriller
- Screenplay by: Adnan Habib; Imtiaz Hossain
- Directed by: Yasir Al Haq
- Starring: See below
- Theme music composer: Tinu Rashid
- Country of origin: Bangladesh
- Original language: Bengali
- No. of seasons: 1
- No. of episodes: 6

Production
- Producers: Ali Afzal Uzzal; Edila Farid Turin
- Cinematography: Tuhin Tamizul
- Editor: Anis Masud
- Production companies: Hoichoi; Sensemakers

Original release
- Network: Hoichoi
- Release: 17 August 2023

Sharey Showlo is a 2023 Bangladeshi drama thriller web series. It was directed by Yasir Al Haq. It consists of seven episodes. Afran Nisho in the lead roles. The series premiered on Hoichoi on 17 August 2023.

== Cast ==
- Afran Nisho as Ashfaq Reza
- Intekhab Dinar as Rakib
- Zakia Bari Mamo as Rini
- Imtiaz Barshon as Altaf
- Afia Tabassum Borno as Natasha
- Quazi Nawshaba Ahmed as Ayesha
- Md. Irfan Uddin Chowdhury as Shafiq
- Shahed Ali as Gaffar

== Reception ==
=== Critical response ===
Archi Sengupta of Leisure Byte gave the web series a rating of 2.5 out of 5 stars, describing it as a dialogue-heavy and slow-burning mystery thriller. While praising the cast's competent performances and the engaging background score, the review noted that the frequent non-linear timeline jumps and narrative back-and-forth created confusion rather than tension. The review further observed that although the series cleverly addresses issues of class disparity and corruption, the central murder plot and final payoff were somewhat disappointing, concluding that it serves as a one-time watch.

Writing for Dhaka Tribune, Marouf Kholifa noted that Sharey Showlo offers an intriguing narrative for mystery enthusiasts, highlighting the ensemble cast's strong performances. However, the review pointed out that Afran Nisho's performance received mixed reactions from critics and viewers, as the series did not quite reach the high benchmark set by his previous works like Surongo. The review further added that unlike typical Nisho-centric projects, Sharey Showlo relies on an ensemble narrative where the plot progresses through all the central characters equally rather than focusing solely on him.

Ahnaf Shafee of The Financial Express noted that while Sharey Showlo possesses a strong foundational storyline, it ultimately struggles to convey its core message and themes effectively to the audience. The review highlighted narrative shortcomings in execution, pointing out that despite its intriguing premise, the storytelling fails to deliver a satisfying impact.

Jeet Satragni of Samay Updates, rated the series 7.5 out of 10, praising it as a gripping and well-crafted mystery thriller. The review highlighted director Yasir Al Haq's execution, the engaging screenplay, and Afran Nisho's strong lead performance, noting that the tension and unresolved narrative layers successfully lay the groundwork for future developments.

Arnab Sanyal of Independent Television praised the series and highlighting its tight narrative, compelling courtroom drama, and strong character arcs. While commending Nisho's lead performance and the ensemble cast, and noted minor narrative oversights, including an over-reliance on coincidences and a somewhat predictable plot progression.
