= Tanzika Amin =

Bangladeshi actress and model

- তানজিকা আমিন
- Citizenship: Bangladeshi
- Occupations: Actress; model
- Years active: 2004–present
- Spouses: Enamul Karim Nirjhar (m. 2011; div. 2013); Saif Basunia (m. 2024)
- Mother: Ismat Ara Mina

Tanzika Amin is a Bangladeshi actress and model. She made her debut with the film Bakul Phuler Mala (2006), directed by Delwar Jahan Jhantu.

== Background ==
Tanzika Amin was born to Ismat Ara Mina.

== Career ==
Amin began her career in 2004 by participating in Lux Channel I Superstar, where she became the first runner-up.

In 2006, she made her debut with the film Bakul Phuler Mala, directed by Delwar Jahan Jhantu, in which she acted opposite Riaz. Later, after a long eight-year gap, she acted in Tania Ahmed's film Good Morning London, which was later renamed Valobasha Emoni Hoy. In 2019, she appeared in the musical film Gohiner Gaan.

Her film, Omimangshito by Raihan Rafi, which is based on the Murder of Sagar Sarowar and Meherun Runi, features her playing the title role of 'Neeru'.

== Filmography ==
=== Films ===
Key
| † | Denotes films that have not yet been released |

| Year | Title | Role | Notes | Ref. |
|---|---|---|---|---|
| 2006 | Bakul Phuler Mala | Mala | Debut film | |
| 2017 | Valobasha Emoni Hoy | Mithila | | |
| 2019 | Gohiner Gaan | Tanzika | | |
| 2025 | Dimlight | Tania | Released on Chorki | |
| 2025 | Omimangshito | Neetu Chowdhury | Won – BIFA Awards for Best Actress; Released on iScreen | |
| TBA | Andhar † | Piya | Post-production | |
| TBA | Robi in Dhaka † | TBA | Post-production | |

=== TV/Web series ===
| Year | Title | Role | Director | TV/OTT | Ref. |
|---|---|---|---|---|---|
| 2010–2011 | Path Jana Nai | Shakila | Syed Zamim | ATN Bangla | |
| 2023 | Mohanagar | Mitu | Ashfaque Nipun | Hoichoi | |
| 2024 | Kaalpurush | Nova | Salzar Rahman | Chorki | |
| 2025 | Bohemian Ghora | Noorjahan | Amitabh Reza Chowdhury | Hoichoi | |

== Personal life ==
Amin married film director and architect Enamul Karim Nirjhar in 2011. But they divorced in 2013. Later, in 2024, she married Saif Basunia who is an Australian expatriate.
