= Valobasha Emoni Hoy =

Valobasha Emoni Hoy ভালোবাসা এমনই হয়
- Poster of Bhalobasha Emoni Hoy
- Directed by: Tania Ahmed
- Screenplay by: Tania Ahmed
- Story by: Raihan Khan
- Produced by: Faridur Reza Sagar; Ebne Hasan Khan
- Starring: Bidya Sinha Saha Mim; Irfan Sazzad; Mir Sabbir; Tanzika Amin; Mishu Sabbir; Robert Young; Sohel Khan; Tariq Anam Khan
- Edited by: M.H. Sohel
- Music by: S.I. Tutul; Habib Wahid; J.K.
- Production company: Impress Telefilm
- Release date: 27 January 2017
- Running time: 139 mins
- Country: Bangladesh
- Language: Bengali

Valobasha Emoni Hoy (Bengali: ভালোবাসা এমনই হয়) is the first directorial venture for model and actress Tania Ahmed and was produced by Faridur Reza Sagar under the banner of Impress Telefilm Limited. Irfan Sazzad makes his debut as a film actor in this movie with prominent actress, Bidya Sinha Saha Mim, seen as the lead actress with Mir Sabbir, Mishu Sabbir, and Tariq Anam Khan.

== Plot ==
The story starts off with two mercenaries, Mishu and Mahatab (Mishu Sabbir and Mir Sabbir) who receive a briefcase full of money for a job, murder, which they were supposed to do. But they decide to reform and start a new cleaner life and would use the money to kick start their new life They enjoy their time with the money they had received and roam around London. At a point of their journey, they see a Bengali girl, Oishee (Bidda Sinha Saha Mim) with a British guy, Peter. Mishu falls for her immediately, and they decide to follow her. While following her, they realize that someone is already following them. Someone who turns up everywhere they were going asking for a lighter. They keep that in mind and follow Oishee to her house in the jungles. There they find the guy who had been following them, Sajjad (Irfan Sajjad) and threatens him to find out why he was following them. They find out that Sajjad was hired by Oishee's father (Tareq Anam Khan) to get rid of Peter. Mishu, in order to see Oishee, peeks into Oishee's house but instead sees another girl, Mithila, and gets stunned by seeing her alive. This was the girl they were supposed to assassinate but she remained alive. Then they team up with Sajjad to solve these unsolved mysteries but to find out a numerous problems which they had to face with great difficulties.

== Cast ==
- Bidya Sinha Saha Mim as Oishee
- Irfan Sazzad as Sazzad
- Mir Sabbir as Mahtab
- Mishu Sabbir as Mishu
- Tanzika Amin as Mithila
- Robert Young as Peter
- Sohel Khan as Amzad
- Tariq Anam Khan as Imtiaz

== Music ==
Songs composed by S.I. Tutul, Habib Wahid & JK Majlish while lyrics are penned by S.I. Tutul, Latiful Islam Shibli, Zahid Akbar, Faruk Hossain and Sudip. Singers Habib Wahid, S.I. Tutul & Others

Song	Singer
Valobasha Emoni Hoy Title Song	S.I. Tutul and Naumi
Chumuke Chumuke Koro Pan	Dilshad Nahar Kona
Thanda Pani	S.I. Tutul
Matite Naki Akashe	S.I. Tutul and Naumi
Thikana Nai Shimana Nai	Jk Majlish
Amar Icche Kore	S.I. Tutul

== Production ==
The film has been shot entirely in Kent city of London. The film is a romantic-action movie with a love triangle being the main theme. The film is being produced by Impress Telefilms Limited. The script and dialogue are written by Rayhan Khan.

== Release ==
On 1 January 2017 the title of the film was exposed to YouTube. The film will be released on 27 January, Jazz Multimedia performance.

== Review ==
The Daily Star gave the movie 6 out of 10, saying the movie had a good plot and performance but it could be slow at times.

== See also ==
- Cinema of Bangladesh
- List of Bangladeshi films of 2017
