= Udhao =

- The cover photo of the film Udhao
- Udhao
- Directed by: Amit Ashraf
- Written by: Amit Ashraf
- Starring: Monir Ahmed Shakeel; Shahed Ali; Quazi Nawshaba Ahmed; Animesh Aich; Ritu Sattar; Shahin Akter Swarna; Saiful Islam; Ithila Islam
- Release date: September 28, 2013 (Star Cineplex)
- Running time: 90 minutes
- Country: Bangladesh
- Language: Bengali

Udhao (Bengali: উধাও; English: Runaway) is a 2013 Bangladeshi film directed and written by Amit Ashraf. It was released on September 28 on Star Cineplex and in October 4 commercially in around five cinemas. The film has brought home seven international awards and grants. The cast of the film includes Shahed Ali and Shakil Ahmed in the roles of two protagonists—Babu and Akbar, respectively—along with Animesh Aich, Ritu Sattar, Quazi Nawshaba Ahmed, Shahin Akhtar Swarna, Saiful Islam, and Ithila Islam.

== Background ==
No song is added to the film as a separate item. There are only two folk numbers by Fakir Laal Mia that the actors sometimes hum, keeping the natural flow of the plot. Visitors at the Cineplex welcomed the director and spoke highly of the production.

"It was wonderful. Good story and good execution of the story," said popular singer Anusheh Anadil. "Among the actors, Shahed Ali in the role of Babu and Shakil Ahmed in the role of Akbar were brilliant," said Kollol Kumar, a visitor. The film is the debut production of Kazi House Productions.

== Cast ==
- Monir Ahmed Shakeel as Akbar Rahman
- Shahed Ali as Babu
- Shakil Ahmed
- Quazi Nawshaba Ahmed as Mita
- Animesh Aich as Raj
- Ritu Sattar as Remi Rahman
- Shahin Akter Swarna as Runa
- Saiful Islam
- Ithila Islam
