= Alvi Ahmed =

Bangladeshi film director and script writer

- আলভী আহমেদ
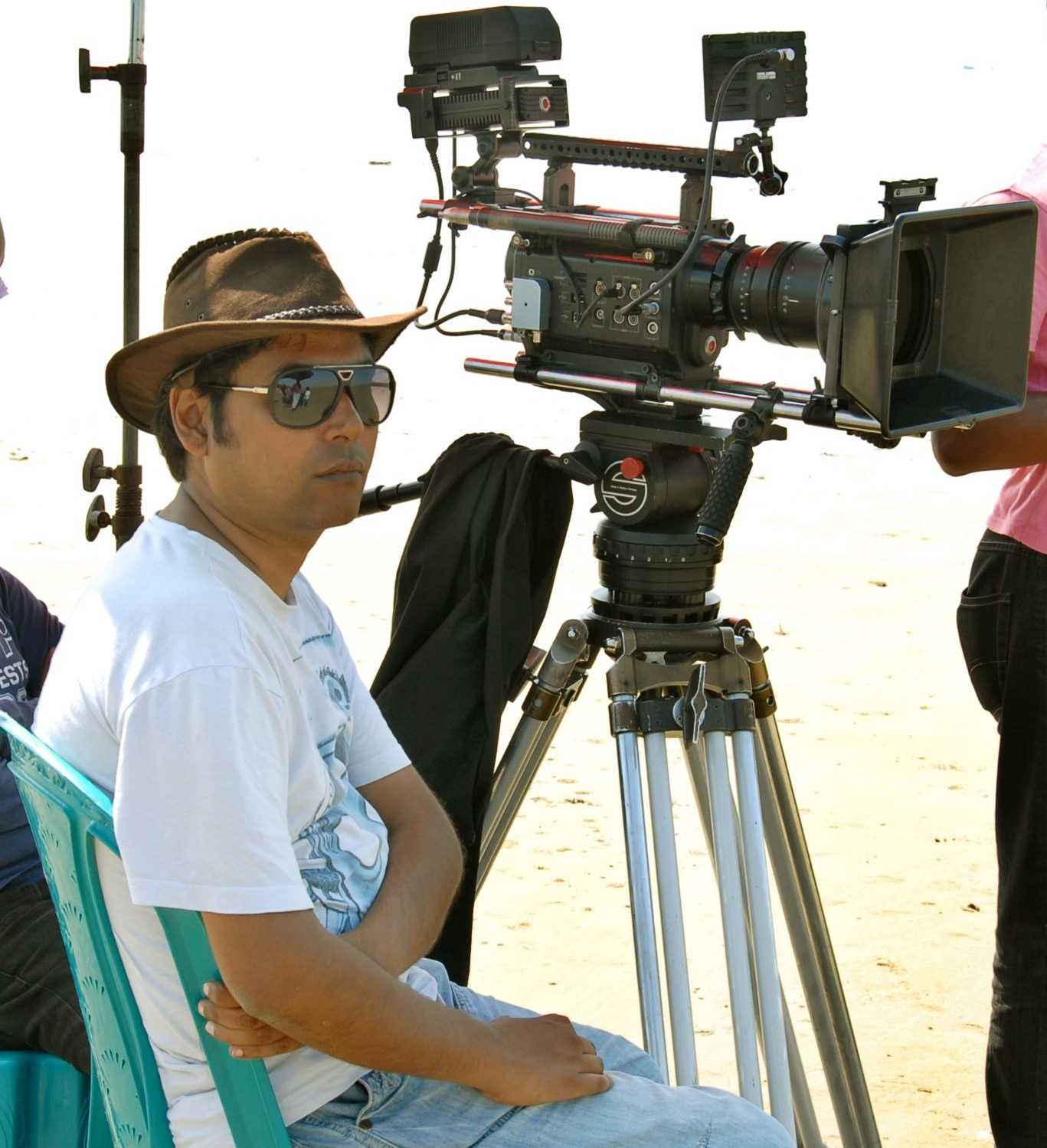
- Born: Alvi Ahmed; 11 October 1980 (age 45); Gopalganj, Bangladesh
- Citizenship: Bangladesh
- Education: Barishal Cadet College; Bangladesh University of Engineering and Technology (B.sc)
- Occupations: Director, script writer and Translator
- Years active: 2005–present
- Era: 2010's
- Organizations: Directors' Guild Bangladesh; Bangladesh Film Development Corporation
- Known for: Bengali translation of Norwegian Wood
- Notable work: Illusion, Adrishya Manab
- Parents: MR. Nawsher Ali (father); Mrs. Jahanara Begum (mother)

Alvi Ahmed (Bengali: আলভী আহমেদ) is a Bangladeshi director and script writer in both television and cinema. He has directed around 100 dramas and a full-length feature film. He was nominated several times for the "Meril Prothom Alo Awards". In 2015, his directed film "U-Turn" got released in more than 80 movie theatres around the country. He is a translator. He has also translated some stories and novels of the famous Japanese writer Haruki Murakami.

== Early life and education ==
Alvi Ahmed was born on 11 October 1980 in the District of Gopalgonj, Bangladesh. He is the son of Mr. Nawsher Ali and Mrs. Jahanara Begum.

He has completed his secondary and higher secondary education from Barishal Cadet College.He is an ex-cadet of the 16th batch of the institution(Cadet Number 821).He was in Sher-e-Bangla(Green)house.In 2005, Alvi graduated as an electrical engineer from Bangladesh University of Engineering and Technology (BUET). He was married to Jinat Hossain in 2016.

=== Film ===
In 2015, Alvi Ahmed finished working on his first Bangla movie U-Turn. Several Bangladeshi actors like Misha Sawdagor, Moutushi Biswas, Shahiduzzaman Selim, Shipan Mitra, Irfan Sazzad, Airin Sultana worked under his production. The movie was released in more than 80 movie theatres nationwide.

=== Drama ===
Alvi Ahmed has directed almost 100 TV dramas. Some of his significant productions are Batashe Muktir Grhan, Shunno theke Shuru, Vagabond, The Corporate, 2441139 (Bela Bosh), Neel Botam, Tahminar Dinjapon, Parallel Image, Shopner Moto Din

=== Translated book ===
He has translated a number of Stories written by Haruki Mukarami. In October 2020 he has translated Haruki Mukarami's popular novel Norwegian Wood in Bengali which was one of the best seller in Bangladesh.

== Nominations and awards ==
Count	Year	Award	Category	Work	Result
01	2008	11th Meril Prothom Alo Awards	Best Drama Director (Critics)	Kushum O Murkho Mofijer Golpo	Nominated
02	2008	10th CJFB Performance Award	Best Serial Drama Direction	Adda	Won
03	2011	14th Meril Prothom Alo Awards	Best Drama Director (Critics)	Tahminar Jibonjapon	Nominated
04	2012	RTV Star Award	Best Drama Director	Illusion	Won
05	2015	RTV Star Award	Best Drama Director	Adrishya Manab	Won

== Movie ==
Year	Movie	Director	Notes	Ref.
2015	U-Turn	Yes		

== Gallery ==
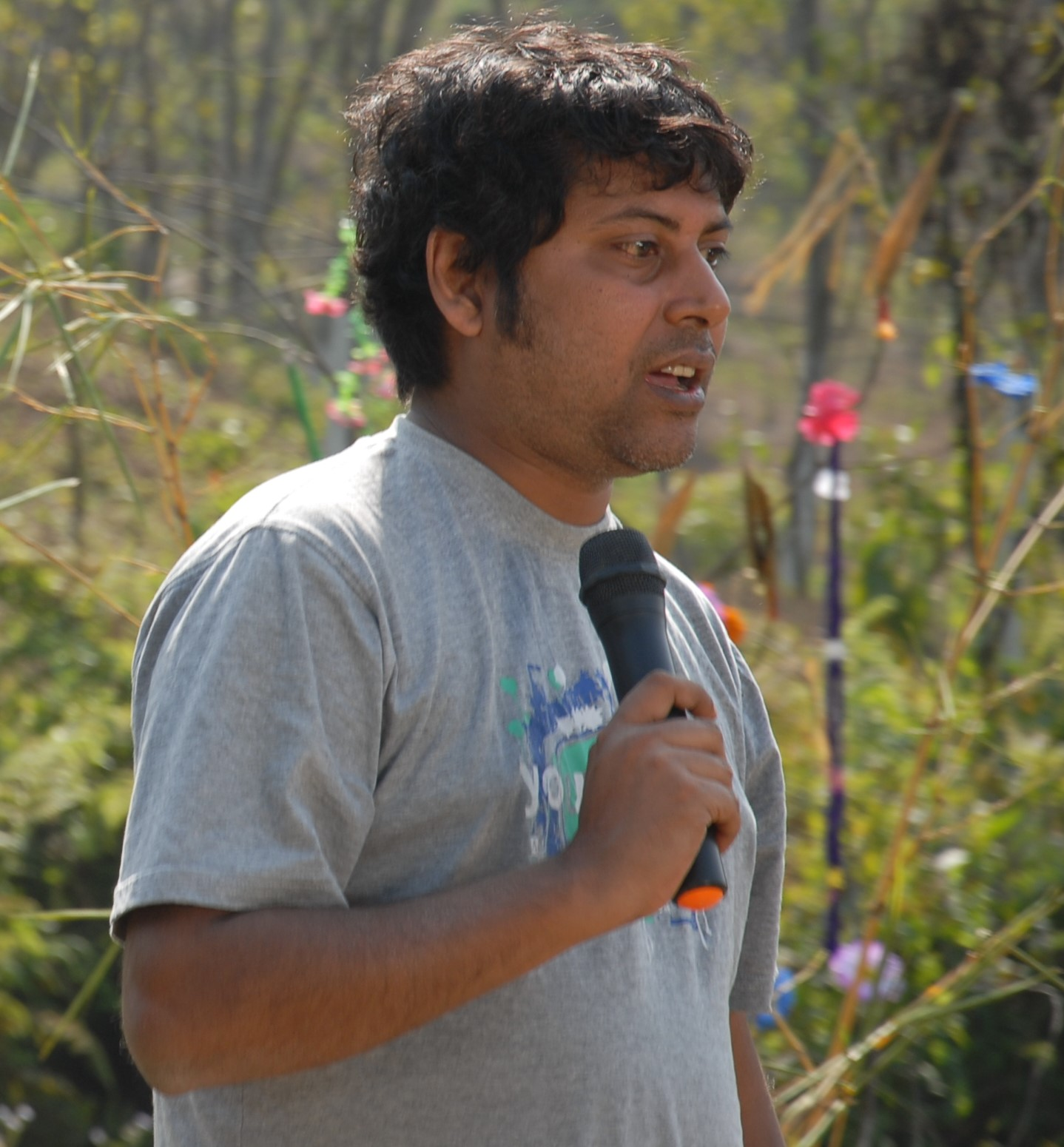
Alvi Ahmed Directing a Drama.

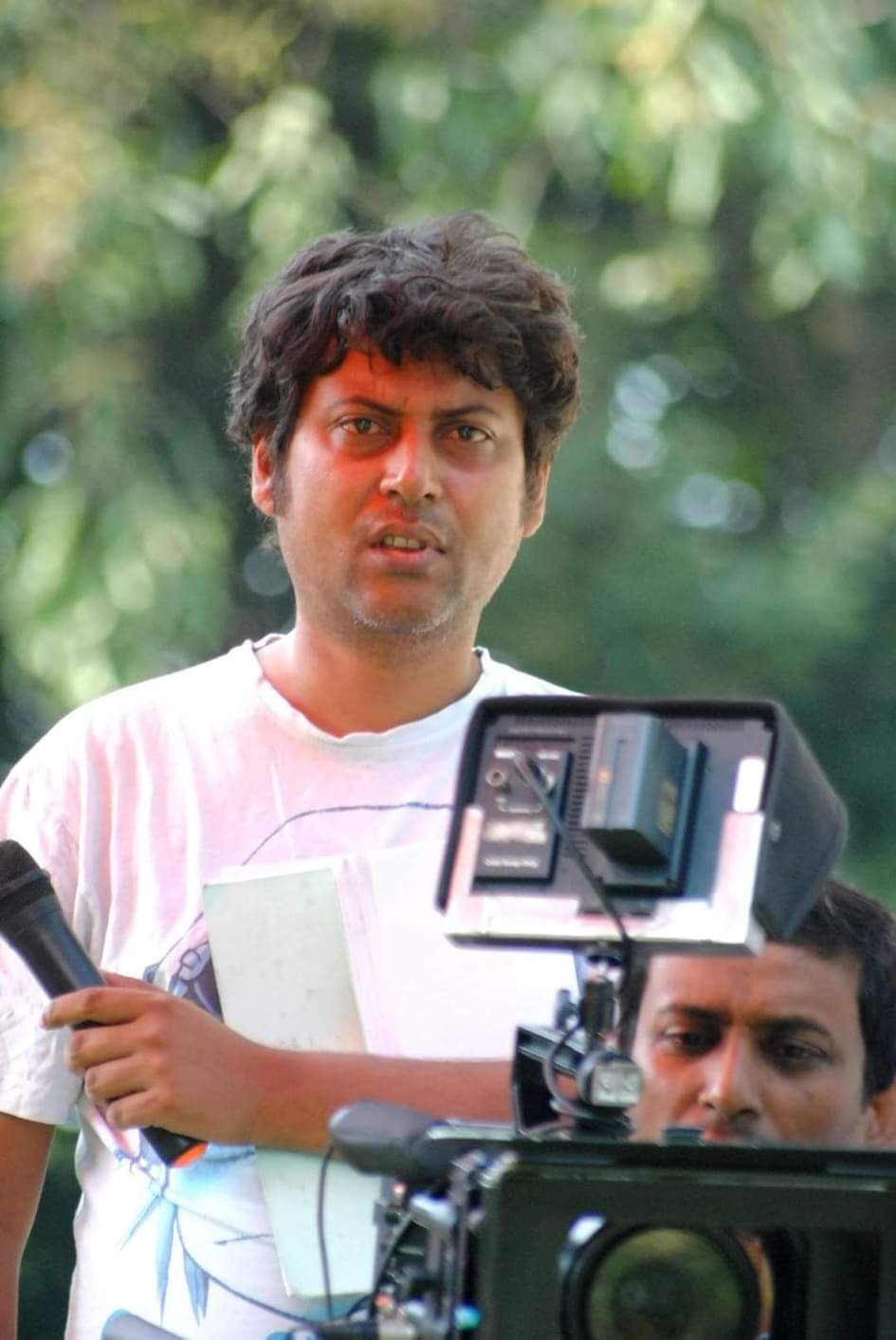
Alvi Ahmed in the set of "U-turn".

== See also ==
- Riaz
- Taukir Ahmed
- Dhallywood
- Bangladeshi film actor
- Cinema of Bangladesh
