= Chandrabati Kotha =

Bengali biographical drama film

- Poster
- Directed by: N Rashed Chowdhury
- Produced by: N Rashed Chowdhury
- Release date: 2019
- Country: Bangledash
- Language: Bengali

Chandrabati Kotha is a 2019 Bengali biographical drama film directed by N. Rashed Chowdhury. The movie is based on the life of Chandravati, first feminist poet of Bengal. Directed by N Rashed Chowdhury

The film premiered at the 2019 Kolkata International Film Festival. This movie was selected for the international category for the Asia Pacific Screen Awards.

== Plot ==
The story revolves around the elegiac life of Chandrabati, 16th century woman poet of Bengali language. She is best known for her women-centered epic Ramayana. Her father Dijabangshi Das was also a poet. Chandrabati falls in love with another poet, Jayananda but he leaves her for another woman. Heartbroken Chandrabati confines herself inside a Shiva temple and starts rewriting the Ramayana.

== Cast ==
- Dilruba Hossain Doyel as Chandrabati
- Imtiaz Barshon as Jayananda
- Tanay Biswas as Ashok
- Balaram Das as Guru
- Quazi Nawshaba Ahmed as Sonai
- Jayanta Chattopadhyay as Dwijabangshi Das
- Gazi Rakayet as Dewan
- Mita Rahman as Sulochona
