= Gohiner Gaan =

- Movie poster
- Directed by: Sadat Hossain
- Written by: Sadat Hossain
- Produced by: Enamul Haque
- Starring: Asif Akbar; Syed Hasan Imam; Tanzika Amin; Aman Reza; Quazi Asif Rahman; Toma Mirza; Tulona Al Harun
- Cinematography: Mehedi Rahman
- Edited by: Leon Rozario
- Music by: Tarun Munshi; Pallab Sannal; Partho Mazumder
- Production company: Bangladhol
- Distributed by: The Abhi Kathachitra
- Release date: December 20, 2019
- Running time: 105 minutes
- Country: Bangladesh
- Language: Bangla

Gohiner Gaan (Bengali: গহীনের গান) is a 2019 Bangladeshi musical film. The film was written and directed by Sadat Hossain and produced by Enamul Haque under the banner of Bangladhol. The film stars Asif Akbar and Toma Mirza in the lead roles and Syed Hasan Imam, Tanzika Amin, Aman Reza and Quazi Asif Rahman played supporting roles in the film. It was the first feature musical film of Bangladesh.

== Cast ==
- Asif Akbar
- Syed Hasan Imam
- Tanzika Amin
- Toma Mirza
- Aman Reza
- Quazi Asif Rahman
- Tulona Al Harun
- Arosh (child artist)
- Mugdhota Morshed (child artist)

== Soundtrack ==
Gohiner Gaan

Soundtrack album by Tarun Munshi, Partho Mazumder
- Released: 2018
- Recorded: 2019
- Genre: Feature Film Soundtrack
- Length: 43:18
- Language: Bengali
- Label: Bangladhol
- Producers: Tarun Munshi, Partho Mazumder

Track List
No.	Title	Lyrics	Music	Singer(s)	Length
1.	"Emono Borshay"	Tarun Manushi	Tarun Munshi	Asif Akbar	5:00
2.	"Baba"	Rajib Ahmed	Tarun Manshi	Asif Akbar	5:09
3.	"Bondi"	Tarun Munshi	Tarun Munshi	Asif Akbar	4:42
4.	"Bondhu Tor Khobor Ki Re"	Rajib Ahmed	Pallab Sanal; Partho Mazumder	Asif Akbar	04:23
5.	"Tor Jonno Kanna Pacche Khub"	Sadat Hossain	Tarun Munshi	Asif Akbar	5:05
6.	"Tumi Ek Rupkotha"	Tarun Munshi	Tarun Munshi	Asif Akbar
7.	"Rajar Meye"	Tarun Munshi	Tarun Munshi	Asif Akbar	4:09
8.	"Tumar Jonno"	Tarun Munshi	Tarun Munshi	Asif Akbar	4:32
9.	"Sadharan Manush"	Tarun Munshi	Tarun Munshi	Asif Akbar	5:21
Total length:					43:18

== Release ==
The film was released in 13 theatres on December 20, 2019.
