= Kumar Bishwajit =

Bangladeshi singer and composer

Kumar Bishwajit কুমার বিশ্বজিৎ
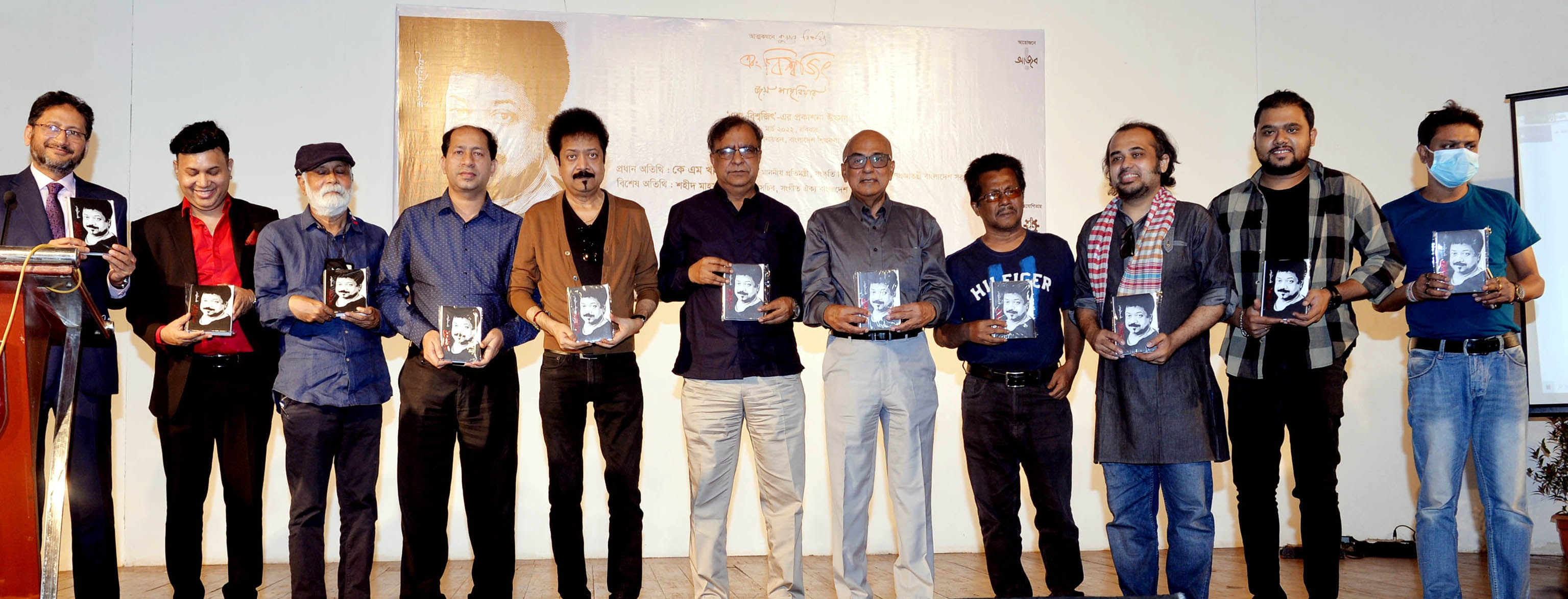
- Bishwajit in 2022

Background information
- Born: Kumar Bishwajit Tultul; 1 June 1962 (age 64); Sitakunda, Chittagong, Bangladesh
- Occupations: Singer, composer
- Instrument: Vocal
- Years active: 1981–present

Kumar Bishwajit (born 1 June 1962) is a Bangladeshi singer and composer. He received Bangladesh National Film Award for Best Male Playback Singer two times for the films Swami Streer Wada (2009) and Projapoti (2011). He also got the Best Music Composer award for Swami Streer Wada. In 2006, celebrated musician Kumar Bishwajit received the Meril-Prothom Alo Critics' Choice Award for Best Singer for his acclaimed album, (Drishti Bhora Brishti). A decade later, his versatility was further recognized by the Bangladesh Film Journalists' Association (BACHSAS). At their 2016 awards ceremony, he earned a Jury Board Special Award for his extensive work as both singer and music director on the musical film (Sarangshe Tumi). These honors underscore his dual mastery of vocal performance and musical composition across different eras of his career.

== Early life ==
Bishwajit was born on 1 June 1962, to Sadhan Ranjan Dey and Sova Rani Dey in Sitakunda, Chittagong, Bangladesh.

== Career ==
He started his music career by performing on a radio show in 1977. He spent his childhood in Chittagong district and took primary education from Chittagong. He used to come and go to Dhaka for his career. He was first associated with the band Rhythm-77 for 2 years. Then he founded his own band "Feelings" in 1979. Then he left the band and went on to pursue his solo career. He performed his first television show on BTV in 1980. Bishwajit has released more than 30 solo music albums.

== Works ==
=== Solo ===
1. Tumi Roz Bikele Aamar Bagane duet with Shoeb
2. Best Hits of Kumar Bishwajit Vol-1
3. Super Kumar Bishwajit vol-1
4. Kumar Bishwajit Vol-2
5. Feelings of Kumar Bishwajit Vol-3
6. Biroher Aakash (1988)
7. Bishader Sworolipi (1990)
8. Jekhane Simanto Tomar (1991)
9. Othoi Neel (1992)
10. Du FoTa Chokher Jol (1993)
11. Hridoyer Moyna Todonto (1994)
12. Onuvobe Ovimane (1995)
13. Dirghoshwas (1996)
14. Gontobbo (1997)
15. Shikor(Root) (1998)
16. Kumar Bishwajit ShresThho Gaan (1998)
17. Prohori (1999)
18. Shikari (1999)
19. Oboshese (2000)
20. Ek Kothar ChiThhi (2001)
21. Ek MuThho Jochhona (2001)
22. Rongdhonu Ronge duet with Asha Bosle
23. Swopno Urai duet with Mitaly Mukharji
24. Smritir Palki
25. HaTi duet with Fahmida Nabi
26. Sondhya Tara mixed Tapan Chowdhury
27. DrishTi Vora BrishTi (2006)
28. Maa Jononi (2008)
29. Rodela Dupur (2009)
30. Celebrating 30 Years of Musical Journey (four)Albums (i)Megher Palki, (ii)Ekla Aakash, (iii)Swopner Aanagona, (iv)Premer Aabas.
31. Priyo Onuvob (2014)
32. Sarangshe Tumi(2016)

== Film scores ==
1. Wrong Number (2004)
2. Swami Streer Wada (2009)
3. Jaago (2010)
4. Projapoti (2011)

== Books ==
1. Abong Bishwajit (2022)

== Filmography ==
| Year | Film | Song | Composer(s) | Songwriter(s) | Co-singer(s) |
|---|---|---|---|---|---|
| 1983 | Protirodh | "Shono Shoma Ektu Darao" | Sheikh Sadi Khan | Nazrul Islam Babu | Haimanti Shukla |
| 1984 | Norom Gorom | "Ore O Banshiwala" | Subal Das | Ahmed Zaman Chowdhury | Anju Ghosh |
| 1985 | Raj Kopal | "Koto Rongo Jaano Re" | Alauddin Ali | Amjad Hossain | Runa Laila |
| 1985 | Prem Kahini | "Esona, O Amar Jiboner Jibon" (duet) | Alauddin Ali | Gazi Mazharul Anwar | Sabina Yasmin |
| 1985 | Prem Kahini | "Picnic, Aaj Picinic" | Alauddin Ali | Gazi Mazharul Anwar | Runa Laila |
| 1985 | Prem Kahini | "Ami Je Preme Porechhi" (duet) | Alauddin Ali | Gazi Mazharul Anwar | Rulia Rahman |
| 1985 | Prem Kahini | "Esona, O Amar Jiboner Jibon" (male) | Alauddin Ali | Gazi Mazharul Anwar | solo |
| 1985 | Prem Kahini | "Esona, O Amar Jiboner Jibon" (short) | Alauddin Ali | Gazi Mazharul Anwar | solo |
| 1985 | Prem Kahini | "Ami Je Preme Porechhi" (short) | Alauddin Ali | Gazi Mazharul Anwar | solo |
| 1987 | Protirodh | "Shanai Bajbe, Bajbe Bajbe Shanai" | Sheikh Sadi Khan | Nazrul Islam Babu, Mozammel Haque | Manabendra Mukherjee, Sabina Yasmin |
| 1987 | Protirodh | "Shanai Bajbe, Bajbe, Bajbe Shanai" (sad) | Sheikh Sadi Khan | Nazrul Islam Babu, Mozammel Haque | Manabendra Mukherjee, Sabina Yasmin |
| 1987 | Protirodh | "Hridoy Debe Naki" | Sheikh Sadi Khan | Nazrul Islam Babu, Mozammel Haque | Sabina Yasmin |
| 1987 | Protirodh | "Shono Soma, Ektu Darao" | Sheikh Sadi Khan | Nazrul Islam Babu, Mozammel Haque | Haimanti Shukla |
| 1988 | Jogajog | "Kochi Kacha Patar Moto" | Alauddin Ali | Gazi Mazharul Anwar | Runa Laila |
| 1999 | Laal Badshah | "Amar Moner Uttore Dokkhine" | Abu Taher | Moniruzzaman Monir | Kanak Chapa |
| 2000 | Bortoman | "Jaane Januk Jogotbasi" | Ahmed Imtiaz Bulbul | Ahmed Imtiaz Bulbul | Kanak Chapa |
| 2000 | Kukkhato Khuni | "Ei Hridoyer Sada Kagoje" (version 1) | Shawkat Ali Emon | Kabir Bakul | Kanak Chapa |
| 2000 | Kukkhato Khuni | "Ei Hridoyer Sada Kagoje" (version 2) | Shawkat Ali Emon | Kabir Bakul | Kanak Chapa |
| 2001 | Tandob Lila | "Dao Onno, Dao Bostro" | Ahmed Imtiaz Bulbul | Ahmed Imtiaz Bulbul | solo |
| 2001 | Tandob Lila | "Dao Onno, Dao Bostro" (reprise) | Ahmed Imtiaz Bulbul | Ahmed Imtiaz Bulbul | solo |
| 2002 | Itihas | "Bhita Nai Re" | Ahmed Imtiaz Bulbul | Ahmed Imtiaz Bulbul | solo |
| 2002 | Swami Streer Juddho | "Aaj Mon Pherari" | Shawkat Ali Emon | Kabir Bakul | Anima D'Costa |
| 2002 | Swami Streer Juddho | "Hridoyta Hoye Gelo Churi" | Shawkat Ali Emon | Kabir Bakul | Anima D'Costa |
| 2003 | Baba | "Ei Prithibir Shuru Aar Shesh" | Alauddin Ali | Kabir Bakul | Kanak Chapa |
| 2003 | Big Boss | "Hajaro Surjo Dube Jabe" | Alauddin Ali | Kabir Bakul | Kanak Chapa |
| 2003 | Dui Bodhu Ek Shami | "Bhalobashte Giye Ami" | Alam Khan | Kabir Bakul | Sabina Yasmin, Baby Naznin |
| 2003 | Dui Bodhu Ek Shami | "Proti Second Proti Minute" | Alam Khan | Kabir Bakul | Kanak Chapa |
| 2004 | Baap Betar Lorai | "Shono Priya Shono" | Shawkat Ali Emon | N/A | Anima Roy |
| 2004 | Bachao | "Chokhe Chokh Porle" | Emon Saha | | Rizia Parvin |
| 2005 | Phuler Moto Bou | "Amake Chhara Aar Kauke" | Emon Saha | Gazi Mazharul Anwar | solo |
| 2007 | Moner Sathe Juddho | "Pagol Korechho Tumi" | Emon Saha | Ashraf Babu | Mimi Naznin |
| 2009 | Bolona Kobul | "Amaro Jibone Tumi" | Shawkat Ali Emon | N/A | Samina Chowdhury |
| 2009 | Tumi Amar Swami | "Deewana Deewana" | Emom Saha | Kabir Bakul | solo |
| 2010 | 5 Takar Prem | "Ektukhani Thomke Gelam" | Shawkat Ali Emon | Kabir Bakul | Mimi Naznin |
| 2010 | 5 Takar Prem | "Bachi Kemone Bolo" | Shawkat Ali Emon | Kabir Bakul | Soniya |
| 2012 | Ek Mon Ek Pran | "Bidhata Jototuku Bhalobeseche" | Shawkat Ali Emon | | Nazmun Munira Nancy |
| 2012 | Ek Mon Ek Pran | "Cholte Cholte Poth Phurabe" | Shawkat Ali Emon | | Kanak Chapa |
| 2013 | Ki Prem Dekhaila | "Tumi Shono Shono" | Shawkat Ali Emon | Kabir Bakul | Dolly Sayontoni |
| 2016 | Dhumketu | N/A | Ahmed Humayun | Sudip Kumar Dip | N/A |
| 2021 | Chironjeeb Mujib | N/A | Emon Saha | N/A | solo |

== Personal life ==
Bishwajit is married to Naima Sultana. Their only son, Kumar Nibir Dey. He has been living in Canada since 2023 after Nibir was in a road accident in early 2023. 3 of Nibirs friends Shahriar Khan, Angela Baroi and Arian Deepto that were also in the accident had passed away.

== Awards ==
- Bangladesh National Film Award for Best Male Playback Singer for Swami Strir Wada (2009) and Projapoti (2011)
- Bangladesh National Film Award for Best Music Composer for Swami Strir Wada (2009)
- Film Bangla Best Playback Singer Male Award for Jaago – Dare to Dream (2010)
- Meril-Prothom Alo Critics' Choice Award for Drishti Bhora Brishti (2006)
- Bangladesh Film Journalists' Association (BACHSAS) "Jury Board Special Award" for Sarangshe Tumi as both singer and music director on the musical film (2016)
