= Enamul Karim Nirjhar =

Bangladeshi architect and filmmaker

- এনামুল করিম নির্ঝর
- Born: 29 November 1962 (age 63); Rajshahi, East Pakistan, Pakistan
- Education: Bangladesh University of Engineering and Technology
- Occupations: Architect, filmmaker
- Spouses: Zakia Rahman Reeta (m. 1992; div. 2011); Tanzika Amin (m. 2011; div. 2013); Aupee Karim (m. 2016)
- Buildings: Ninakabbo, Chaabi, British American Tobacco Headquarter, Voot restaurant

Enamul Karim Nirjhar (born 29 November 1962) is a Bangladeshi architect and filmmaker.

He is the founder and principal architect of System Architects, a prominent architectural studio known for its contemporary designs across different sectors, including residential, mixed-use, commercial, institutional, industrial, hospitality, and community development projects. In the 1990s, Nirjhar launched an innovative interior design initiative that significantly influenced the restaurant scene in Dhaka. He designed several conceptual restaurants in Dhaka and Chittagong, including Bukhara, Santoor, Bonanza, White Castle, and Asparagus. He designed WE in Hampshire, UK.

Nirjhar expanded his team to enhance architectural practices, coining the process "Total Architecture." Notable projects include the British American Tobacco headquarters in Dhaka, Nina Kabbo, and Fera.

Nirjhar has recently initiated a collaboration with Indian entrepreneurs and architects, founding System Architects India. He is also one of the most prominent filmmakers in Bangladesh. His first feature film, Aha!, was released in 2007 and won national awards in four different categories, including Best Direction.

Nirjhar is combining his experiences in architecture, film, and music to create EK Nijhar Collaborations (EKNC). This platform is designed to collaborate with young professionals from different creative sectors so they can grow creatively and intellectually while also securing a source of income.

== Early life and education ==
Enamul Karim Nirjhar was born to Muhammad Afsar Ali and Momtaz Begum in Rajshahi. In the mid-1970s, he enrolled at Rajshahi Cadet College. He later studied architecture at the Bangladesh University of Engineering and Technology, which is the highest-ranking engineering institute in the country.

== Career ==
=== Architecture ===
In 1995, Nirjhar formed System Architects. From the very beginning he was involved in the process of designing every little detail of all the projects. From the mid-90s to 2005, he designed a number of popular restaurants. In 2000 he designed the first theatre restaurant in Bangladesh called Asparagus, where fine dining combined with live performances was quite a new experience for the food lovers of the city. In 2005 he designed the first horror-themed restaurant named Voot ('Ghost' in English) in Dhaka with his regular collaborators. Other restaurants he designed include White Castle, Bukhara, Santoor, Hotel Agrabad, and We in Dhaka, Chittagong and the UK where he tried to put his social observations in the form of profiling and performance. Integration of our culture and heritage, empowerment of the craftsmen along with combining other art forms with the design was a key aspect in his design to give a combined thematic restaurant experience.

After this period, Nirjhar designed quite a few residential buildings. He also started a trend of naming and engraving meaningful Bangla words, like names of the lost rivers of Bengal, and beautiful phrases on the facades of buildings. Some wonderful examples of this can be found in his residential designs like Jethay, Hochhe Hobe and Fera.

In 2003, Nirjhar designed the Head Office Complex of British American Tobacco Dhaka. For which he was awarded the AYA JK Cement Architect of the Year award in 2005. In 2013 he designed a conceptual commercial neighborhood titled 'nina Kabbo', where the poems of 12 prominent poets of Bengali literature were used on different facades of the building for the first time in Bangladesh. He was awarded a Berger Award of Excellence in Architecture for the design of the building.

=== Film ===
Nirjhar began his film career by directing short documentary films mainly focused on social issues. He had a long-standing desire to create full-length feature films. However, he observed that the film industry was heavily influenced by capitalism, primarily producing commercial films. Despite recognizing the industry's fragility and the slim chances of recouping investments, he saved money from his earnings for 18 years to produce his own film.

In 2007, Nirjhar released his first feature film, Aha!, which was groundbreaking at the time. The film's songs became viral hits, and it received critical acclaim, winning Bangladesh National Film Awards in four categories: Best Direction, Best Cinematography, Best Editing, and Best Playback Singer (Female). Aha! was also Bangladesh's submission for the Academy Award for Best Foreign Language Film that year, although it did not receive a nomination.

Nirjhar's second film, Nomuna (2009), is a dystopian socio-political satire centered on political turmoil. In addition to directing, he wrote the story, script, and songs for the film. The eight-song soundtrack was released in September 2009, but the Bangladesh Film Censor Board refused to issue a censor certificate for the film, despite it being produced with a government grant.

As the founder of 9 STEPS, Nirjhar is currently working to develop a group of professionals who can contribute to the future of the film and media industry. He is currently producing a series of nine films as a part of his Noy Bochorer Boro project.

=== Photography and writing ===
From an early period, Nirjhar was very much involved in photography as another of his passions. He participated in several exhibitions with his photography works. Bornodhara (2001), a book of his photography and poetry, was a tribute to the Bangla alphabet and language.

Nirjhar joined the popular humor magazine Unmad, and in the mid-1980s became a contributor to the weekly Sachitra Shandhani. He was the initiator of an experimental magazine on cinema named Kino Eye and a literary magazine, Potito Shubash. He has also written three books of stories: Kanush (2010), Jaa (2012), and Oboshesh Ongshobishesh.

Album Ek Nirjharer Gaan is a compilation of 101 Bangla songs written and composed by Nirjhar and released on the label Gaanshala.

== Filmography ==
- Tarona (2001)
- The Shadow Gap (2003)
- Kheyal (2003)
- Kohen (2004)
- Tokhon (2004)
- Ebong Porobashi (2004)
- Tini (The Architect) (2005)
- Manush, Koyta, Ashchhe (2006)
- Aha! (2007)
- Nomuna (Example) (2009) (Unreleased)
- Byapaar (In Fact) (2024)
- Bishebish (Poison of 2020) (2024)
- Banan (A Well Known Story) (2024)

== Awards ==
Architecture

- AYA (2007)
- Excellence in Architecture (2013)

Film

- Bangladesh National Film Awards in 4 categories (2007)

Photography

- National Winner of Kodak Fiap Photography Competition (1992)

== Personal life ==
Nirjhar married model and actress Tanzika Amin in 2011 and divorced in 2013. He then married actress Aupee Karim in July 2016. With Karim, he has a daughter (aged 5).
