= Monir Ahmed Shakeel =

Bangladeshi actor

- মনির আহমেদ শাকিল
- Occupation: Actor

Monir Ahmed Shakeel is a Bangladeshi film and television actor. He won Bangladesh National Film Award for Best Supporting Actor for his role in the film Surongo (2023).

== Career ==
Shakeel made his film debut with Udhao (2013). He won Bangladesh National Film Award for Best Supporting Actor for 25th film Surongo (2023). He also acted in O Amar Desher Mati, Matir Projar Deshe, Onek Sadher Mayna, and Ragi. He acted in Bangamata (2023), a short film based on the life of Sheikh Fazilatunnesa Mujib. He went on to act in more films including Taandob (2025) and NeelChokro (2025).

Shakeel worked in several theatre troupes including Padatik and Centre for Asian Theatre. He also founded one – Dashrupok.

Shakeel also acts in television drama plays, e.g. Mratitya (2023).
