= Ekhane Rajnoitik Alaap Joruri =

2026 Bangladeshi Bengali-language film

- Poster
- Bengali: এখানে রাজনৈতিক আলাপ জরুরি
- Literally: Political Talk Is Necessary Here
- Directed by: Ahmed Hasan Sunny
- Screenplay by: Mostashim Billah Aditto
- Story by: Khalid Mahbub Turjo; Mostashim Billah Aditto; Ahmed Hasan Sunny
- Based on: July Revolution (Bangladesh)
- Produced by: Khalid Mahbub Turjo
- Starring: Imtiaz Barshon; Azad Abul Kalam; A. K. Azad Setu; Keya Al Jannah; Tanvir Apurba
- Cinematography: Abu Raihan
- Edited by: Imamul Baker Apolo
- Music by: Avishek Bhattacharjee
- Production company: Talking Trees Cinema
- Distributed by: Talking Trees; BanglaVision
- Release date: 16 January 2026
- Country: Bangladesh
- Language: Bengali

Ekhane Rajnoitik Alaap Joruri (Bengali: এখানে রাজনৈতিক আলাপ জরুরি, lit. 'Political Talk Is Necessary Here') is a 2026 Bangladeshi film in the Bengali-language. Its story and screenplay were written by Khalid Mahbub Turjo and Motashim Billah Aditto and directed by Ahmed Hasan Sunny. It stars Imtiaz Barshon, Azad Abul Kalam, A. K. Azad Setu, Keya Al Jannah and Tanvir Apurba in the lead roles. The film is set against the backdrop of the July 2024 student uprising, it also highlights the political and social history of Bangladesh at various times.

Cinematography was by Abu Raihan and editing was by Imamul Baker Apollo. Music was composed by Abhishek Bhattacharya. The film was produced and distributed by Talking Trees Cinema. This is the director's first feature-length film.

== Plot ==
Frustrated by political repression and personal loss, Nur returns from abroad to a country that feels increasingly empty. His younger brother Mukto, an idealistic activist, believes that change must come from within and dedicates himself to the political struggle. When Nur wants to flee, Mukto decides to stay and fight. Mukto records the story of ordinary people's suffering under authoritarianism. As state violence increases, activists disappear and protests are suppressed. Noor repeatedly tells Mukto to leave, but ideals and duty divide the brothers. As the danger increases, their bond weakens.

== Cast ==
- Imtiaz Barshon as Noor, a Bangladeshi expatriate
- Azad Abul Kalam
- A. K. Azad Setu
- Keya Al Jannah
- Tanvir Apurba

== Release ==
The film was released on 16 January 2026, alongside the Spanish animated film Sultana's Dream, based on the famous short story by Begum Rokeya, in five branches of Star Cineplex in Bangladesh.
