= Omimangshito =

2025 Bangladeshi mystery thriller film

- Poster
- Directed by: Raihan Rafi
- Screenplay by: Raihan Rafi; Mehedi Hasan Moon; Saiduzzaman Ahad
- Story by: Raihan Rafi
- Produced by: Shahidul Alam Sachchu
- Starring: Imtiaz Barshon; Tanzika Amin
- Cinematography: Saddat Hossain
- Edited by: Simit Ray Antor
- Music by: Jahid Nirob
- Production company: Impress Telefilm
- Distributed by: iScreen
- Release date: 15 December 2025
- Country: Bangladesh
- Language: Bengali

Omimangshito (Bengali: অমীমাংসিত, transl. Unsolved) is a 2025 Bangladeshi mystery thriller film, directed by Raihan Rafi and produced by Shahidul Alam Sachchu under the banner of Impress Telefilm from an association with Kanon Films. It is an original programming of iScreen. The film stars Imtiaz Barshon and Tanzika Amin. The film's story revolves the mysterious murder of a journalist couple. The film had previously been blocked by the former censor board in april 2024 due to its resemblance to the real-life double murder of journalist couple Sagar Sarowar and Meherun Runi, cleared for release by the newly formed Bangladesh Film Certification Board and released by iscreen in 15 December 2025.

Omimangshito was released via Iscreen on 15 December 2025.

== Premise ==
A journalist couple found dead in their own home early the morning. The investigation begins, and instead of answers, more and more questions start to appear. Will this unresolved...

— Iscreen

== Cast ==
- Imtiaz Barshon as Arnob Shahriar
- Tanzika Amin as Neetu Chowdhury
- Shahidul Alam Sachchu as Khalequzzaman Haque
- Manoj Pramanik as Shafayat
- Rashed Mamun Apu as Shams Alam
- AK Azad Shetu as Ashfaq
- Fariha Shams Sheuti as Dr. Rubina

== Release ==
The film was scheduled to be released on February 29, 2024. After the release of the teaser, there was a lot of discussion among viewers, and many speculated that it was based on the 2012 murders of journalist couple Sagar Sarowar and Mehrun Runi—a case that is still unsolved and under trial. Although the Certification Board's decision did not mention that actual incident, intense discussion ensued over the similarities and ideas—thus stalling the release. It was finally released on the OTT platform IScreen on December 15, 2025.

== Awards ==
Year	Awards	Category	Result	Ref.
2026	Meril-Prothom Alo Awards	Best Film	Nominated	
