= Nusrat Jahan Diana =

Bangladeshi actress

- নুসরাত জাহান ডায়ানা
- Born: 18 March; Khulna
- Children: 1

Nusrat Jahan Diana is a Bangladeshi actress recognized for her performances in television drama serials such as Alta-Sundori and Rakkhosi.

She started her career as a billboard model and made her television debut In 2007 with Debashish Biswas's Chithi.

== Works ==
Television

- Alta-Sundori (2008 & 2009 series on RTV)
- Rakkhosi (2009 drama on ATN Bangla)
- Chorai Dhon (2009 drama on ATN Bangla)
- Bolo Ban Jamata (2009 drama on RTV)
- Bazi (2010 drama on ATN Bangla)
- Kata (2010 telefilm on NTV)
- Bumerang (2012 telefilm on Banglavision)
- Mon Foring Er Golpo (2012 telefilm on NTV)
- Himigirite Jhara Palok (2012 telefilm on GTV)
- A-er Golpo (2013 series on Banglavision)
- Oporajita (2013 series on RTV)
- Mumbasa (2013 series on Masranga TV)
- Dakhinayon er Din (2013 series on NTV)
- A Shohor Jadur Shohor (2014 drama on Channel 24)
- Love Finally (2015 series on RTV)
- Jogajog Golojog (2015 series on NTV)
- Ami Tumi Tumi Ami (2016 drama on NTV)
- Tomay Dilam Prithibi (telefilm on Deepto TV)
- Shanti Adhidaptar (2016 series on RTV)
- Shomrat (2016 series on NTV)
- Sahosika (2017 telefilm on Channel i)
- Nabab Er Prem (2017 drama on NTV)
- Diganter Shes Prante (2016 drama on ATN Bangla)
- Nir Khoje Gangchil (2016 series on ATN Bangla)
- Vagabond (2017 series on Banglavision)
- Bhalobasha Na Basha (2017 telefilm)
- Raju 420 (2017 series on ATN Bangla)
- Astha (2017 series)
- Amader Hatkhola (2017 series)
- Akash Chhoya Swapno (2017 series)
- Rater Otithi (2017 drama)
- Sei Pothe (2018 drama)

Films

- Jaago (2010)
- Guerrilla (2011)
