= Unoponchash Batash =

2020 Bangladeshi romantic drama film

- Theatrical release poster
- Bengali: ঊনপঞ্চাশ বাতাস
- Directed by: Masud Hasan Ujjal
- Written by: Masud Hasan Ujjal
- Screenplay by: Masud Hasan Ujjal
- Story by: Masud Hasan Ujjal
- Produced by: Red October Films
- Starring: Sharlin Farzana; Imtiaz Barshon; Manosh Bondopadhay; Elora Gohor
- Cinematography: Ridoy Sarker
- Edited by: Ismail Hossain
- Music by: Masud Hasan Ujjal
- Production company: Red October Films
- Distributed by: Bangla Distribution Services
- Release date: 23 October 2020
- Running time: 165 minutes
- Country: Bangladesh
- Language: Bengali

Unoponchash Batash (transl. forty nine winds) is a 2020 Bangladeshi romantic drama film. It was independent film director Masud Hasan Ujjal's first full-length feature film. The film stars Sharlin Farzana and debutant Imtiaz Barshon in lead roles. It is Sharlin Farzana's first film in a lead role. The film received the International Jury Award at the 19th Dhaka International Film Festival (DIFF) and Masud Hasan Ujjal received the Best Director Award at the Rainbow Film Festival in London.

It was scheduled to release on 13 March 2020 but was postponed due to the coronavirus outbreak. The film is produced by Asif Hanif under the banner of Red October Films while Syeda Shaon is the executive producer. Bassbaba Sumon made his playback debut with the film. Apart from directing, the story, dialogues, screenplay, art direction and music direction of the film were also done by Masud Hasan Ujjal.

The film was released on 23 October 2020 in Dhaka's Star Cineplex and Chittagong's 'Silver Screen' cinema theater. It was also released in Narayanganj's 'Cinescope' cinema hall.

== Plot ==
Nira is a Dhaka University student with a well-to-do family. She suddenly falls in love with a man who is a sales representative of medicines and is from a low-income family, despite the latter's educational qualification and income being low, Nira starts to love him passionately.

Suddenly the man dies of cancer and Nira gets mentally unhealthy; though she married him when he was admitted in hospital. Nira goes under a delusion, she sees that her husband is coming alive from graveyard. Nira works as a teacher in Dhaka University where she studied.

== Cast ==
- Sharlin Farzana - Nira
- Imtiaz Barshon - Ayan
- Manosh Bandapadhaya
- Elora Gauhor
- Enamul Haque
- Faria Shams Sheoti
- Lamyea Ahmed - Aurthi
- Khairul Basar as Neera's friend
