= Imtiaz Barshon =

Bangladeshi actor, director and composer

- ইমতিয়াজ বর্ষণ
- Born: Ehsan Rahman Barshon Imtiaz; 22 September; Chittagong, Bangladesh
- Education: Chittagong College
- Occupations: Actor; director; composer
- Years active: 2020–present

Imtiaz Barshon is a Bangladeshi actor, director and music composer who works predominantly in Dhallywood cinema and Bangladeshi television drama. He made his debut in the big screen with the romantic drama film Unoponchash Batash (2020) directed by Masud Hasan Ujjal.

When he was a teenager, a friend named Reza took him to a play rehearsal in his neighborhood on the occasion of the Ekushey February event. Soon after that event, he got the opportunity to act in another play on the occasion of March 26. Since then, he developed a love for acting. Barshon's biggest inspiration is Irrfan Khan. Among Bangladeshi actors, Chanchal Chowdhury inspires him a lot.

== Early life and education ==
Barshon was born on 22 September in Muradpur, Chittagong. His home is in Amtoli village in Bhujpur, Fatikchhari, Chittagong. However, he grew up in Hamzarbagh area of Chittagong, where he complete his SSC in Rahmania High School. Even though he studied Political science at Chittagong College, but he was always passionate about acting. He completed 'Theatre Appreciation' course at the Fame School of Dance, Drama and Music while still a student. In 2011, he moved in Dhaka for acting.

== Career ==
Barshon started his career playing a role in a local stage. After that, he joined with 'Tirjak Natyagoshthi', whom he worked for about three and a half years. Later, he joined 'Avantgarde', a theatre group, and was also active in pantomime with the 'Natua Nirbak Sampraday'.

In 2008, Barshon joined the production of a documentary film titled "Buk Tar Bangladesher Hridoy", directed by Moinul Alam Shawon. In 2010, he started working in Dhaka as an assistant director to Nurul Alam Atique, with the help of Debangshu Hor, the director of 'Natua Nirbak Sampraday'. His first performance on the small screen was in Nurul Alam Atique's play, which was based on Rabindranath Tagore's famous short story 'Shasti'.

In 2020, he made his debut in the romantic drama film Unoponchash Batash, where he also worked as a composer. In 2021, he appears in the film Chandrabati Kotha. He appeared as a cameo in Munshigiri (2021), directed by Amitabh Reza Chowdhury. In 2021, he was praised for his performance in the web series 'Kaiser', directed by Tanim Noor.

== Filmography ==
=== Feature films ===
Key
†	Denotes films that have not yet been released

Year	Film	Role	Notes	Ref.
2020	Unoponchash Batash	Ayan	Debut film	
2021	Chandrabati Kotha	Jayananda		
2021	Munshigiri	Ali Akbar	Released on Chorki	
2022	Nishwas	Shamim	Released on Chorki	
2023	Ora 7 Jon	Solaiman Kazi		
2023	Mayashalik	Sci-fi writer	Cameo appearance	
2023	Apolap		Released in DeeptoPlay	
2025	Omimangshito	Arnob Shahriar	Released on iScreen	
2026	Ekhane Rajnoitik Alaap Joruri	Noor		
2026	Separation †	TBA	Filming	

=== TV series ===
Year	Title	Role	Notes	Ref.
2021–2022	Friendbook	Nayeem	Released on NTV	
2022	Kaiser	Barrister Mokhtar Mahmud Zaffery	Released on Hoichoi	
2023	Sharey Showlo	ADC Altaf	Released on Hoichoi	
2024	Kaalpurush	SI Jahangir	Released on Chorki	
2024	Golam Mamun	Police Officer Robin	Released on Hoichoi	
2025	AKA	DB Officer Sohel	Released on Hoichoi	
2025	Kajins		TV serial on NTV	
