= Dhumketu (2016 film) =

2016 Bangladeshi film

- Movie poster
- Directed by: Shafiq Hasan
- Written by: Munir Reja
- Produced by: Munir Reja
- Starring: Shakib Khan; Pori Moni; Tanha Tasnia; Amit Hasan; Parveen Sultana Diti; Aliraj; Rebecca
- Music by: Ahmed Humayun
- Production company: Munni Production
- Distributed by: Munni Production
- Release date: December 9, 2016
- Running time: 129 minutes
- Country: Bangladesh
- Language: Bengali

Dhumketu (transl. The Comet) is a 2016 Bangladeshi romantic drama film. The film was directed by Shafique Hasan and produced, screenplay, story and dialogue by Munir Reza under the banner of Munni Production. It features Shakib Khan and Pori Moni in lead roles and Tanha Tasnia, Ali Raj, Amit Hasan, Parveen Sultana Diti and Rebecca played supporting roles in the film. This was the last film of actress Parveen Sultana Diti who died three months before the film's release.

== Cast ==
- Shakib Khan - Shaon
- Pori Moni - Rukh Moni
- Amit Hasan
- Tanha Tasnia
- Parveen Sultana Diti
- Ali Raj
- Rebeka Rouf
- Shiba Shanu
- Nazneen Akter Happy - Item Number, special appearance in the song of "Majhe Majhe Ashi"

== Promotion ==
The first look teaser of the film was released on Live Technologies's YouTube on January 9, 2016. After that the second teaser of the released on November 30, 2016. The film got an uncut certificate from the Bangladesh Film Censor Board on November 15, 2016.

== Soundtrack ==
The film's songs are composed by Ahmed Humayun with lyrics penned by Sudip Kumar Dip.

- "Majhe Majhe Ashi" - Pulok, Roma, Moon, Ahmed Humayun
- "Aaj Barabo" - Moumita Tashrin Nodi, Kishore
- "Jibone Cholar Pothe" - Munisha
- "Chupi Chupi Mon" - Imran Mahmudul, Kheya
- "N/A" - Kumar Bishwajit

== Release ==
The film was released on December 9, 2016.
