= Sadat Hossain =

Bangladeshi author (born 1984)

- সাদাত হোসাইন
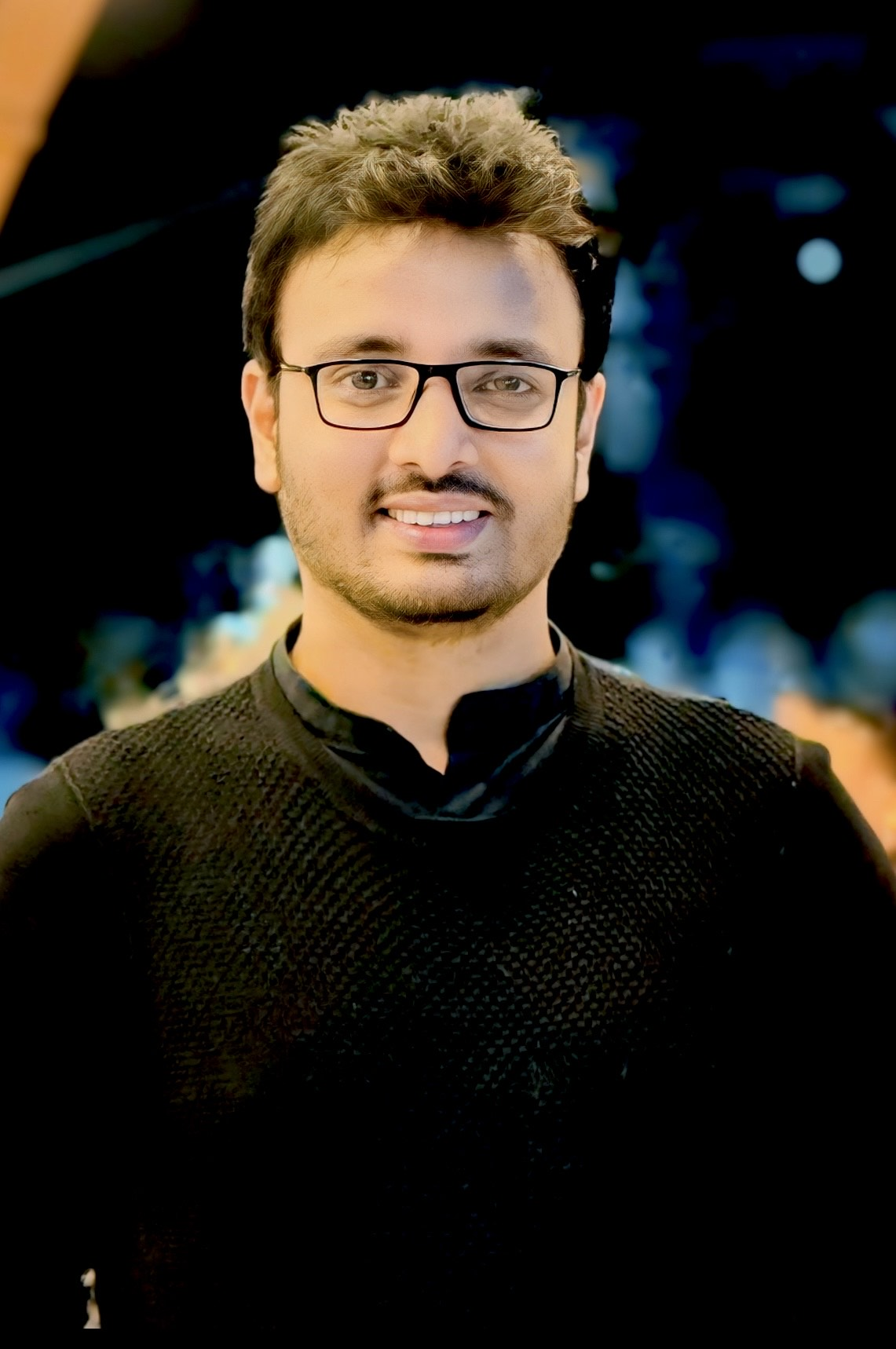
- Sadat Hossain in 2026
- Born: 1984 (age 41–42); Madaripur, Dhaka, Bangladesh
- Education: Jahangirnagar University
- Occupations: Writer, poet, filmmaker, screen play
- Writing career
- Language: Bengali
- Notable works: Arshinagar; Andarmahal; Gohiner Gaan

Sadat Hossain (born 1984) is a Bangladeshi author, poet, screenwriter, film-maker and novelist. He described himself as a storyteller.

== Early life and education ==
Sadat Hossain was born In Kalkini, Madaripur, Dhaka, Bangladesh. He studied anthropology at Jahangirnagar University.

== Career ==
He was a photojournalist in a newspaper. Then the editor told him that he should write the story of those photos. Eventually, with these he published his first book in 2013 named Golpochobi. Then, he started to write the short stories. In 2014 Janalar Opashe published. In 2015 Aarshinagor is the first book when people recognize him in 2015. Besides writing he has interest in filmmaking as well. He has a production house named ‘ASH’ Production house, released a number of visual contents like short films, dramas, music videos, documentaries etc. His novels imbued with vague idealism are often long, and melodramatic. A feature-length musical film named 'Gohiner Gaan' written and directed by him.

According to the largest online bookstore in Bangladesh, Rokomari.com, he is the bestselling fiction writer at Ekushey Book Fair for the last few years.

He is also one of the best selling writer in Bangladesh Book Fair in Kolkata, India.

He regularly writes short stories for newspaper, magazine in Bangladesh & India.

== Books ==
=== Novels ===
- Amar ar Kothao Jaoyar Nei (আমার আর কোথাও যাওয়ার নেই) (2014) ISBN 978-984-90873-3-5
- Aarshinagor (আরশিনগর) (2015) ISBN 978-984-91335-9-9
- Andarmahal (অন্দরমহল) (2016) ISBN 978-984-91336-4-3
- Manabjanam (মানবজনম) (2017) ISBN 978-000-07378-6-1
- Nisongo Nokkhotro (নিঃসঙ্গ নক্ষত্র) (2018) ISBN 978-984-92804-3-9
- Nirbashon (নির্বাসন) (2019) ISBN 978-984-93661-1-9
- Ardhobrotto (অর্ধবৃত্ত) (2020) ISBN 978-984-94319-0-9
- Megheder Din (মেঘেদের ‍দিন) (2019) ISBN 978-984-50257-5-1
- Tomar Name Sondhya Name (তোমার নামে সন্ধ্যা নামে) (2020) ISBN 978-984-50273-4-2
- Shesh Oddhay Nei (শেষ অধ্যায় নেই) (2020) ISBN 978-984-94935-4-9
- Chadmabesh (ছদ্মবেশ) (2020) ISBN 978-984-94935-4-9
- Moronattom (মরণোত্তম) (2020) ISBN 978-984-50260-6-2
- Smritygondha (স্মৃতিগন্ধা) (2021)
- Biva O Bivrom (বিভা ও বিভ্রম) (2021)
- Se Ekhane Nei (সে এখানে নেই) (2021)
- Iti Smritygondha (ইতি স্মৃতিগন্ধা) (2022)
- Priyotomo Osukh Se (প্রিয়তম অসুখ সে) (2022)
- Shongkhochur: First Part (শঙ্খচূড়) (2023)
- Agundana Meye (আগুনডানা মেয়ে) (2024)
- Shongkhochur: Second Part (শঙ্খচূড়) (2025)

=== Story ===
- Golpochobi (গল্পছবি) (2012)
- Janalar Opashe (জানালার ওপাশে) (2013) ISBN 978-984-90462-2-6

=== Poetry ===
- Jete Chaile Jeo (যেতে চাইলে যেও) (2015) ISBN 978-984-92805-1-4
- Ami Ekdin Nikhoj Hobo (আমি একদিন নিখোঁজ হবো) (2017) ISBN 978-984-92804-1-5
- Kajol Choker Meye (কাজল চোখের মেয়ে) (2018) ISBN 978-984-93660-5-8
- Tomake Dekhar Osukh (তোমাকে দেখার অসুখ) (2020) ISBN 978-984-94319-1-6
- Pronoye Tumi Prarthona Hou (প্রণয়ে তুমি প্রার্থনা হও) (2021)

=== Travelogue ===
- Jete Jete Tomake Kurai (যেতে যেতে তোমাকে কুড়াই) (2024)

== Films ==
=== Feature ===
- Gohiner Gaan (2019), writing and direction.

=== Documentary ===
- The Legend Syed Abdul Hadi, writing and direction.

=== Shorts ===
- Bodh
- The Shoes

== Awards ==
- Best Director, Bangladesh Short and Documentary Film Festival 2016
- Chamber International Award
- SBSP-RP Foundation Literature Award
- Humayun Ahmed Literary Award 2019
- Cokh Literary Award 1426
- Shuvojon Literary Award 2019
- Marvel of Tomorrow Influencers Award 2021 – Writer
- Kali O Kalam Tarun Kabi O Lekhak Puraskar 2021 (Fiction)
- Best Writer(Novel) – Dhaka Bank Anonodo Alo Literature Award 2024
- Best Lyricist – Blender's Choice – The Daily Star OTT & Digital Content Awards 2024
