= Quazi Nawshaba Ahmed =

Bangladeshi actress

- কাজী নওশাবা আহমেদ
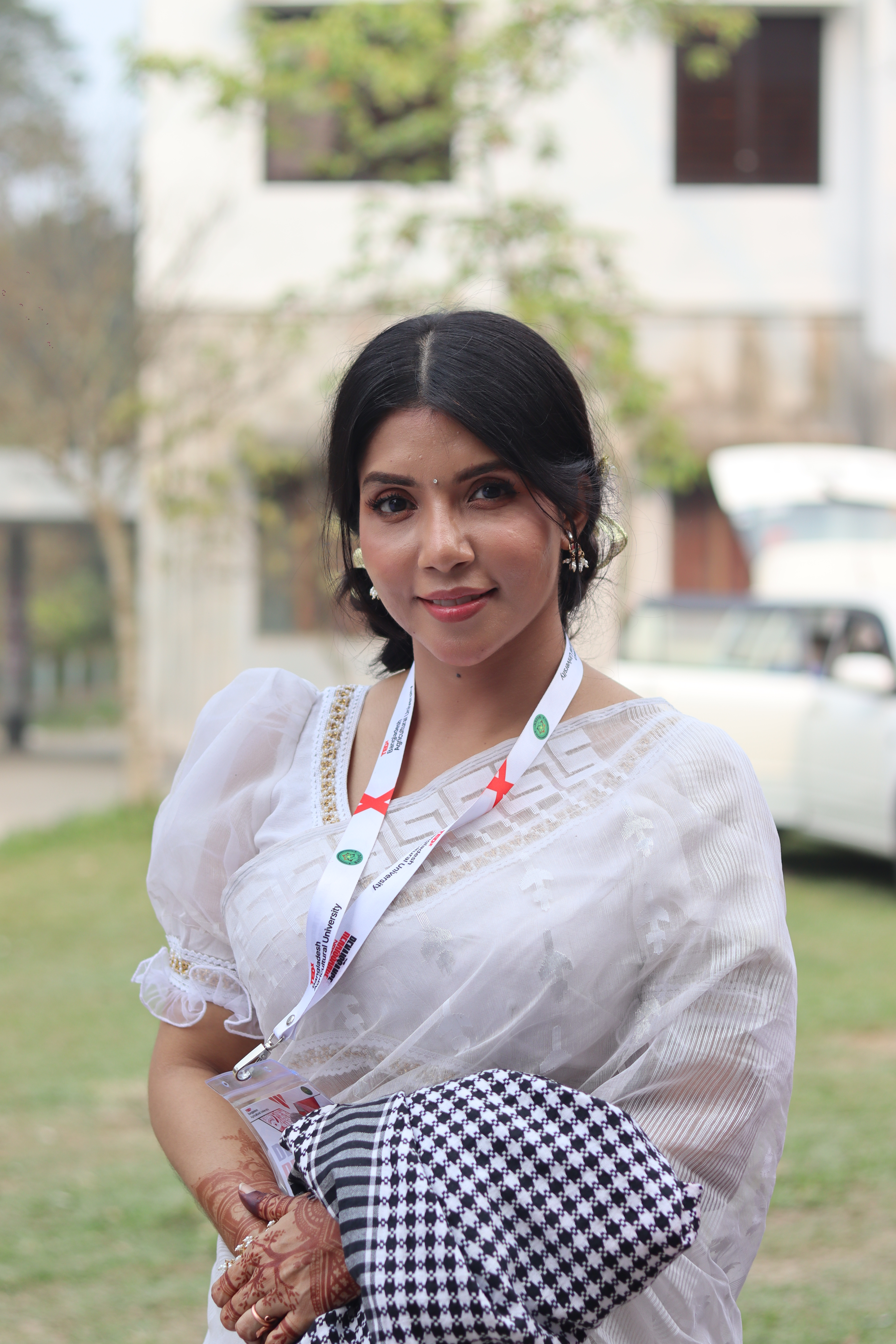
- Nawshaba at TEDx Bangladesh Agricultural University, in 2025
- Education: University of Dhaka
- Occupations: Model, actress
- Years active: 2004–present

Quazi Nawshaba Ahmed is a Bangladeshi actress, voice artist, painter, puppeteer, director and a social activist.

== Background ==
Ahmed studied at the Faculty of Fine Arts, University of Dhaka.

== Career ==
Ahmed first acted in the film Udhao in 2008, which was released on 2013. She also acted in the film Chuye Dile Mon (2015) as a special appearance, but this film was not released due to funding issues. She also acted in the films Dhaka Attack (2017), Bhubhan Majhi (2017), and Chandrabati Kotha (2017), all of which are in post-production.

Ahmed performed the role of a badminton player, Tania, in a short film by Projonmo Talkies, which was released in July 2017 on its YouTube channel.

Ahmed founded a theater troupe named Together We Can in 2018 and she also runs a production studio, X Solutions Ltd. Together We Can produced a play "Riya, Girl with a White Pigeon", featuring children with special needs from Rajshahi.

Ahmed worked as the puppeteer behind Sisimpur’s puppet character Ikri for seven years. In April 2020, amid the COVID-19 pandemic, her organisation Together We Can, along with Mukto Ashor, launched a campaign titled Art for Togetherness 2020. Ahmed and her daughter were featured in June 2020 by the Independent Global Art Festival 2020. In April 2021, she produced a music video titled Alor Khoje featuring musician Shofi Mondol and sign language instructors Ahsan Habib and Afroza Mukta.

Ahmed has been an activist in social movements starting with the 2013 Shahbag protests.

In 2024, she became a member of the Bangladesh Films Certificate Board. In March 2025, Quazi Nawshaba Ahmed was appointed as the "Ambassador for Wildlife" by the Deep Ecology and Snake Conservation Foundation (DESCF). The organization announced her role in promoting animal welfare, wildlife conservation, and environmental awareness. Ahmed, known for her activism on various social issues, has been vocal about animal rights, including protesting incidents of cruelty against stray animals. In a statement, she expressed her lifelong compassion for animals and her commitment to raising awareness about their protection.

In 2025, Ahmed acted in a Bengali-Indian film Joto Kando Kolkatatei, directed by Anik Dutta. She performed in the stage play "Siddhartha", directed by Reza Arif, with the theatre troupe Aarshinagar.

== Personal life ==
Ahmed has a daughter, Prokiti Nazareena Ahmed Bela, aged 12–13.

Ahmed was arrested on 4 August 2018 from Uttara by Rapid Action Battalion (RAB). She was accused of spreading false news over the 2018 Bangladesh road safety protests. On 5 August, RAB officials claimed she had confessed to the allegations. On 21 August, she got ad-interim bail from Dhaka court due to her health conditions. She was placed in a 4-day remand before the court and granted for two day remand on 10 August for quizzing. In January 2019, she was granted permanent bail by the court.

In May 2019, Counter Terrorism and Transnational Crime (CTTC) submitted charge sheet against Ahmed. In November, the High Court stayed the trial proceedings for six months.

== Works ==
=== Films ===
Key
†	Denotes films that have not yet been released

Year	Title	Role	Notes	Ref.
2013	Udhao	Mita	Debut film	
2015	Chuye Dile Mon	Abonti	Special appearance	
2016	Under Construction	Herself		
2017	Bhuban Majhi	Elei		
2017	Dhaka Attack	Sinthia		
2018	Shopner Ghor	Mrs. D'Souza		
2019	Chandrabati Kotha	Sonai		
2021	Koshai	Sriti		
2022	Araal	Shefali	Short film; released on Chorki	
2022	Omanush	Dacoit		
2024	Chaya Brikkho	Manturi		
2024	Meghna Konnya	Hashi		
2025	Saat Bhai Champa: Adi	Devayani		
2025	Joto Kando Kolkatatei	Saba	Debut in Indian Bengali film	
2026	Manushtike Dekho			
2026	Chirkut			
2026	Someshwari †	TBA	Filming; also as director	
TBA	Prothiruddo †	Sunita	Unreleased	

Music video appearance

Year	Song	Artist	Ref(s)
2021	"Kashfuler Shohor Dekha"	Shironamhin	
