= Glenary's =

Colonial-era cafe in Darjeeling, India

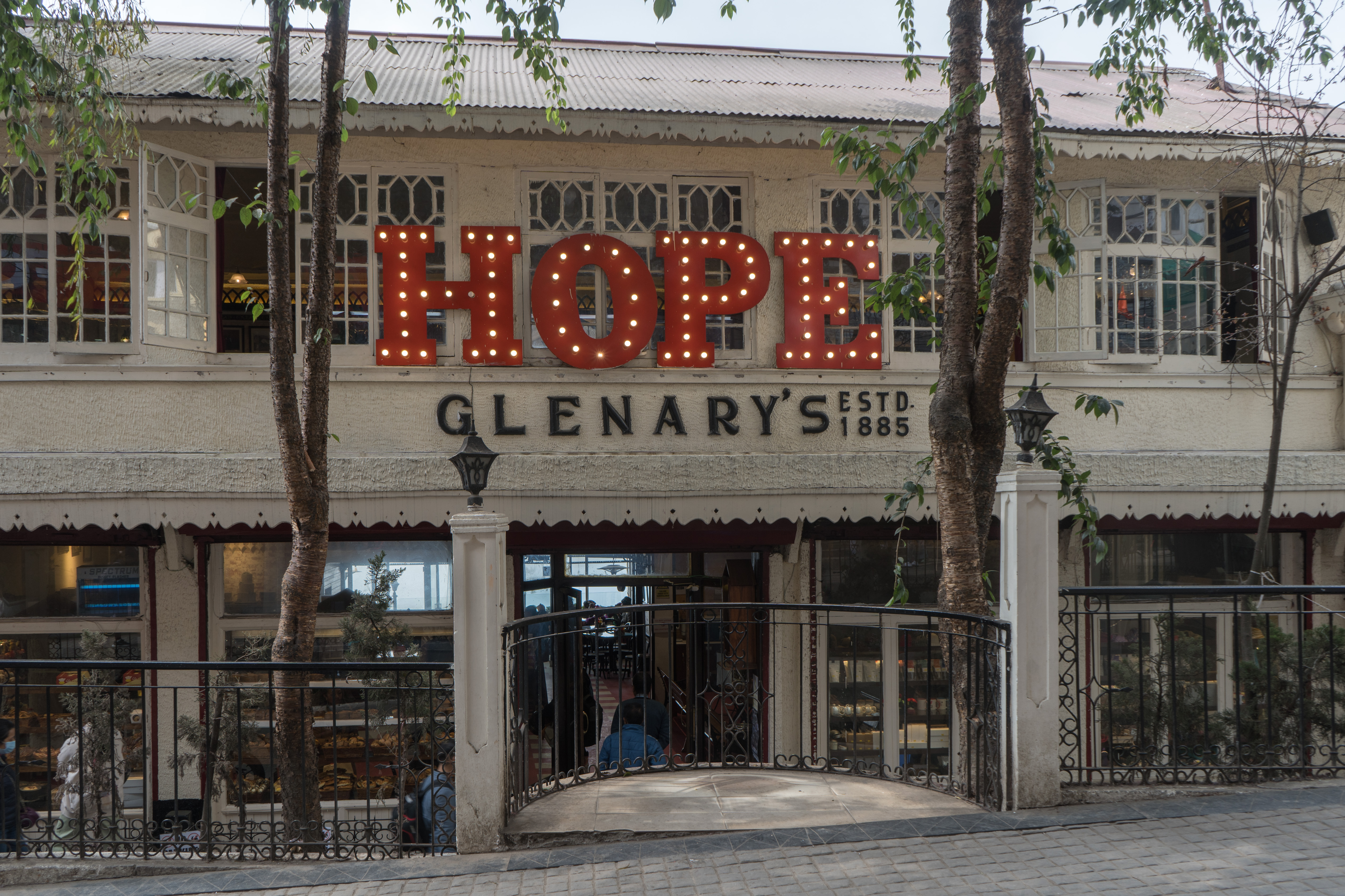
- Glenary's entrance
- Interactive map of Glenary's

Restaurant information
- Established: 1885 (141 years ago)
- Food type: Confectionery
- Location: Darjeeling, West Bengal, 734101, India

Glenary's Bakery & Cafe is a British Raj-era heritage cafe in Darjeeling, India. It was founded as a confectionery store named Vado by an Italian family around 1885. It is counted among the oldest eateries in the hill station (and the country) and is known for its teas and pastries.

The cafe has around 170 permanent employees and no retirement policy.

== Controversies ==
In 2022, the cafe stopped selling Darjeeling tea as a way to protest against some planters’ refusal to grant annual bonus to their workers.

In December 2025, Buzz, Glenary's bar area, was ordered to be closed on account of an incomplete license renewal process and several other violations.
