= Murder of Sagar Sarowar and Meherun Runi =

2012 killings of Bangladeshi journalists

- Tejgaon Thana is a subdistrict of Dhaka.
- Location: Dhaka, Bangladesh
- Date: 11 February 2012; Between 2 a.m. and 5 a.m. (BST UTC+6:00)
- Target: Married journalists
- Attack type: Stabbing
- Weapon: Knives
- Deaths: 2
- Perpetrator: Unknown

The murder of Sagar Sarowar and Meherun Runi (also known as the Sagar-Runi murder case) is about the unsolved double murder case of two well-known, married Bangladeshi journalists who were stabbed to death in 2012. The case is still open.

Rumors have been circulating for a long time that the Awami League and India were involved in the BDR murders because they had secret information about them.

The couple's murder received high-level political attention and widespread media coverage in Bangladesh, and attracted German interest, as Sarowar had lived in Germany and had worked as a journalist for Deutsche Welle. The case was also closely watched by journalists and international press freedom organisations. The couple's murder also unified organisations representing Bangladeshi journalists that had once been separate.

A representative of the family said, "In the past 25 years, this has been the most talked/written about, prioritized case in Bangladesh." A demonstration was called in 2017 for the fifth anniversary of the murder in order to call for the release of the investigation report.

== Biographical and career information ==
Sagar Sarowar
- সাগর সারোয়ার
- Born: Golam Mustofa Sarowar ca. 1975; Dacca, Bangladesh
- Died: 11 February 2012; Dhaka, Bangladesh
- Cause of death: Stabbing
- Body discovered: in a rented apartment in the West Raja Bazar neighbourhood of Dhaka
- Resting place: Azimpur graveyard 23°43′32″N 90°22′51″E
- Occupations: Journalist and editor, TV news
- Employer(s): Maasranga Television, and previously for Deutsche Welle, Ittefaq, Jugantor, and Sangbad
- Organization: Energy Bangla
- Known for: reporting about energy and the environment
- Television: Maasranga Television
- Board member of: Forum for Energy Reporters Bangladesh
- Spouse: Meherun Runi
- Children: 1

Meherun Runi
- মেহেরুন রুনি
- Runi
- Born: Meherun Nahar Runi
- Died: 11 February 2012; Dhaka, Bangladesh
- Cause of death: Stabbing
- Body discovered: in a rented apartment in the West Raja Bazar neighbourhood of Dhaka
- Resting place: Azimpur graveyard 23°43′32″N 90°22′51″E
- Occupations: Journalist, TV news
- Employer(s): ATN Bangla, and previously for Channel i, Sangbad and Jugantor
- Television: ATN Bangla
- Spouse: Sagar Sarowar
- Children: 1

Golam Mustofa Sarowar was better known as Sagar Sarowar. His family is from old Dhaka. He was a broadcast news editor for Maasranga Television since December 2011. He had previously worked for Deutsche Welle's Bangla service for three years as part of the German broadcaster's South Asia department in Bonn, Germany. Before Deutsche Welle, he worked in print as a columnist and a reporter for Ittefaq (ca. 1997), Jugantor, and Sangbad. He was known as an energy reporter, and his work also appeared in the trade magazine Platts Oilgram News. He was a founder and leader of the Forum for Energy Reporters Bangladesh (FERB) and an editor-in-chief for the online magazine Energy Bangla. Sarowar was a director on the nine-member board of FERB, which created a network of energy reporters across the subcontinent. In addition, Sarowar was known as a blogger, and he also wrote for the OhMyNews citizen journalism website for a brief time (c. 2006–2007).

Meherun Nahar Runi was a senior television reporter for ATN Bangla, where she had been working at least since 2001. Before that she worked in broadcast media for Channel i and in print media for Sangbad and Jugantor. She also frequently reported on energy issues in Bangladesh. She was also known as a crime reporter.

The couple had one son, who was five years old at the time of their murder.

They were buried in the Azimpur graveyard in Old Dhaka. It is a well-known burial ground used by Muslim residents of Dhaka.

== Death ==
The married Bangladeshi couple, Sagar and Runi, lived with their five-year-old child on the fourth floor of a five-story building in the West Raja Bazar neighbourhood (mahallah) of Dhaka. Neighbors say that Sarowar and Runi had more than one person in the apartment as guests before they were killed.

Sarowar didn't leave his office at Maasranga until about 1:30 a.m. on the morning of 11 February 2012. From information gathered from a security guard, police believe the couple was killed some time after Sarowar arrived home and before the dawn Fajr prayer, which occurs before sunrise. According to sources, this would place the murder event sometime between 2 and 5 in the morning. Each victim died of multiple stabbing wounds, and sources said Sarowar's limbs were tied and he had the most stab wounds. Their son woke up at around 7 a.m. and discovered his parents dead in a pool of blood and called Runi's mother sometime around 7:30 a.m. by cell phone. The site became an active crime scene around 11 a.m.

The crime scene showed evidence that it had been searched, and the couple's possessions were strewn around the apartment. A kitchen window grill was cut and had an opening of approximately 1.8 feet, which Imam Hossain, deputy commissioner with the Tejgaon police, said would be too small for an adult to pass through.

== Investigations ==
=== Initial investigation ===
Investigators from two different main law enforcement agencies arrived at the crime scene around 11 a.m. on 11 February. The investigation fell under the jurisdiction of Bangladesh Police from Tejgaon Thana, a subdistrict of the Dhaka District, but was also being investigated by the intelligence branch of the Rapid Action Battalion. The RAB was founded in 2004 as a paramilitary arm of the police. Since the couple was well known, the crime scene attracted the attention of those in the upper echelon of Dhaka's law enforcement, as well as politicians. Among the law enforcement officials at the couple's apartment were Hassan Mahmood Khandker, who is the inspector general of the Bangladesh Police, and Benajir Ahmed, commissioner of the Dhaka Metropolitan Police. The Dhaka Courier reported that 14 teams were sent to the crime scene. Days after the investigation began, journalists from the Crime Reporters Association of Bangladesh reported that the two organisations were working independently from one another.

A number of politicians and other high-placed individuals visited the crime scene. Home Minister Sahara Khatun ordered the Bangladesh Police to arrest the murderers of Sagar and Runi within 48 hours. Later, the police told the family that the traffic through the residence had damaged evidence. The traffic through the crime scene could have also contaminated the DNA samples that were later discovered in the labs. Another Home Minister—Muhiuddin Khan Alamgir, who was appointed in September 2012—said after a year had passed, "Journalists and common people destroyed all the important evidences from the spot before police could reach there."

One of the two security guards was initially detained but was released shortly thereafter, and then he disappeared until his arrest almost one year after the case began.

The autopsies in the case were conducted at Dhaka Medical College. The autopsy revealed that possibly three knives were used during the murder. No viscera test was conducted during the autopsy, which was later criticised. The bodies were later exhumed for further testing.

Nowsher Alam Roman, who is Runi's brother, represented both families, and he officially filed the couple's murder case with the police over a day after the murder was discovered. Officer Rabiul Alam was assigned to be the lead detective in the case and headed the investigation for the next two months.

=== Second investigation ===
After two months and the passing of deadlines issued by the Home Minister, justices ruled on a petition by Human Rights and Peace for Bangladesh and said the case had become stalled. The similarities between the stalled investigation in the Sagar-Runi murder case and another high-profile murder of a Saudi Arabian diplomat, Khalaf Al-Ali, on 6 March, along with the political pressure exerted in both cases on investigators, prompted Professor M. Shahiduzzaman from the University of Dhaka to call the latter case "a sequel". By order of the High Court in Bangladesh on 18 April 2012, the Sagar-Runi murder case was reassigned from the Detective Branch to the RAB, both of which are under the Bangladesh Police. The court called for the new investigators to use advanced criminal investigation technologies. And the court also established a monitoring committee that was to be headed by a member of the police who achieved inspector general rank or higher and would be composed of journalists, lawyers, human rights activists, academicians, non-government organisations, and other agencies. Zafar Ullah was appointed the lead investigating officer for the RAB. In late May 2013, Hasanul Haq Inu, information minister, told journalists the government was still analysing the DNA tests against the suspects and the investigation was proceeding according to law.

On 26 April 2012, the RAB, with a court order, oversaw the exhumation of the corpses at the Azimpur cemetery for a viscera test. The RAB said that the viscera test was for checking whether the couple had been poisoned and for DNA. Nowsher Alam Roman, who represented the families, was also present. The samples were sent to a lab in the United States for analysis. In August 2012, it was announced that two US labs had discovered the DNA of others, and the RAB announced it would at a later date test the DNA samples of suspects for a match. After the announcement, the RAB then came under criticism from Bangladesh's National DNA Profiling Laboratory Programme. The RAB had suggested that the analysis could not have been done by a domestic lab when the programme said it had handled over 1800 cases since 2006 and they would have been able to use the same technologies in Bangladesh.

After one year, 127 people had been interviewed about the case. The RAB also conducted videotaped interviews of the six-year-old son, and those images were shown on national television.

Even after a decade, no progress has been made in the investigation. The investigation probe report has been delayed 91 times as of 24 August 2022.

=== Suspects ===
The names of 8 suspects were announced by Home Minister MK Alamgir in October 2012. Alamgir had been appointed the new Home Minister in September. The RAB arrested seven suspects around 9 October for their alleged involvement in the double murder, and the organisation made another related arrest on 9 February 2013. The father of Enamul, the suspect who was arrested in 2013, was reported missing 27 September 2012, shortly before the arrests in the case. Alamgir reported that several of the suspects were also alleged to be suspects in the murder of Narayan Chandra Datta Nitai. At the time of the arrests in 2012, no motive was revealed, but police alleged that several of the arrested were professional killers for hire.

- Rafique Islam, alleged robber
- Bakul Miah, alleged robber
- Masum Mintu Peyada, alleged robber
- Md Sayeed Sayeed, alleged robber
- Tanvir Rahman, Runi's acquaintance
- Kamrul Hassan Arun, driver
- Palash Rudra Paul, security guard
- Humayun alias Enamul, security guard – He was arrested on 9 February 2013.

The families of the victims were sceptical that the announced, alleged suspects were the perpetrators. In late January 2013, the RAB announced that the DNA identified by the labs had failed to match 13 samples, including samples from the suspects. Journalists had also been sceptical that the suspects were the perpetrators.

=== Calls for an international commission ===
After a year-long investigation by the Bangladesh Police, the case was called stalled. One NGO specialising in press freedom and security, Reporters Without Borders, requested an international commission be established. This was also requested by the families.

== Motive ==
Lieutenant Colonel Ziaul Ahsan, then officer in charge from RAB in this investigation, said investigators believed the murder was pre-meditated and committed by someone who knew the victims. Police said at least two people murdered the couple. At first police reported that nothing was stolen, but later reports said Sarowar's laptop computer and cell phones could be missing. Another report, however, claimed that police had retrieved three cell phones as evidence. But in the petition brought to the High Court, it was learned that the couple's computers and laptops had been stolen.

Police announced on 26 February 2012 they were "almost certain" about the motive. However, the motive was never made public by investigators. More than a month after the murder, the organisation Human Rights and Peace for Bangladesh appealed to the High Court of Bangladesh on whether the police should reveal the motive and report their progress. In response to the case, the police were obliged to deliver a report to the court for informational purposes. The defendants in the case were the two law enforcement units and the Home Minister. By 18 April, when the High Court reassigned the case to RAB, the police admitted that they had not discovered a motive.

Journalists identified stories that both Sarowar and Runi were working on that could possibly have been a motive for violence. Runi's reporting involved corruption in Bangladesh's energy industry, and Sarowar was working on violence and minority rights. The online magazine about free speech Sampsonia Way reported that a rumour in Dhaka about the motive was that the couple had sensitive information about land acquisition by a "powerful corporation". The Committee to Protect Journalists has not verified their murder was related to their reporting.

Mahfuzur Rahman, chairman of ATN Bangla, where Runi worked, later publicly asserted that the murder motive involved an extramarital affair and at the same time took a case to court to stop journalists from protesting to push for charges to be filed. While his case included names of 59 journalists active in protests, Rahman did not include the names of his own employees. Journalist organisations responded angrily. Rahman lost his case. After Rahman's statement, the RAB interviewed him at the RAB's Uttara office.

In observing the first anniversary of the murder, the International Federation of Journalists said that law enforcement had failed to "establish a motive". Monjurul Ahsan Bulbul, Boishakhi TV CEO, said to an audience of journalists, "If the government failed to unearth the mystery of Sagar-Runi murder, we can unearth the mystery through investigative reports."

== Context ==
=== Crime ===
According to official Dhaka police records, there were 23 reported murders in February 2012, including the Sagar-Runi murder case, but media reports revealed that more murders were not reported or recorded.

=== Politics ===
Bangladesh's politicians quickly became involved in the high-profile double murder case. Initial statements to the media were given by President Zillur Rahman, Prime Minister Sheikh Hasina Wajed of the Awami League party, and BNP Chairperson Khaleda Zia. Shortly after the murder, Home Minister Sahara Khatun delivered a statement that police would apprehend the perpetrator or perpetrators within 48 hours. A case was filed 36 hours after the discovery of the murder, and the document did not list any suspected names. Khatun issued another statement closer to the deadline that suggested imminent progress. She delivered a further promise in April after journalists announced a nationwide action.

The crime scene was visited by a number of high-profile Bangladeshis active in politics:

- Sahara Khatun, who was a member of the cabinet as home minister
- Mahbubul Haque Shakil, special assistant to Prime Minister Sheikh Hasina
- Mirza Fakhrul Islam Alamgir, Bangladesh Nationalist Party acting secretary general
- AAMS Arefin Siddique, vice-chancellor of Dhaka University
- Syed Fahim Munaim, Maasranga Television CEO

Mirza Fakhrul Islam Alamgir, who is a leader from the opposition BNP, told reporters, "We've been saying repeatedly that the country is turning into a slaughter ground gradually. This brutal killing again proves there is no law and order and rule of law in the country." The Dhaka Courier countered that calling the country a "slaughter ground" was made to score political points.

Prime Minister Sheikh Hasina met two days after the murder with family members representing Sarowar and Runi, along with their son, and she told them that she would see to it that their son would be educated and there would be no impunity in the couple's case and justice would be quick. The Prime Minister later criticised journalists for carrying out demonstrations and at other times praised them for raising awareness. In a widely repeated quote in connection with the case, she said the government could not protect everyone by posting a guard outside their bedrooms. She also told party members that more journalists were killed when her political opponents were in power.

=== Press freedom in Bangladesh ===
According to the committee to Protect Journalists, twelve journalists have been confirmed killed for their reporting in Bangladesh since the organisation first started keeping records in 1992, while six others remain unconfirmed. Of the 18 cases, only three led to convictions. The CPJ has ranked Bangladesh eleventh on its Impunity Index for countries with the most unsolved crimes for the murder of journalists from 2001 through 2010. Journalists Jamal Uddin of Gramer Kagoj and Talhad Ahmed Kabid of Dainik Narsingdi Bani were also killed in 2012.

In 2015, Bangladesh was 146th out of 180 countries in the Reporters Without Borders Press Freedom Index, and it has been on the decline since at least 2011. The organisation expressed concern over impunity in Bangladesh murder cases involving journalists.

Prime Minister Sheikh Hasina, who leads the Awami League party, claimed 16 journalists were killed while the coalition of the BNP, Jamaat-e-Islami, and other smaller political parties controlled the government.

== Impact ==
=== Domestic media coverage ===
Journalists covered the death of one of their own. In Bangladesh, the double murder of the high-profile media couple received significant exposure. Prominent people in politics, education, law enforcement, and media visited the crime scene.

The couple's 5-year-old son, who discovered his parents murdered and had to call for help, was frequently mentioned in news stories. Some journalists interviewed the boy about his discovery shortly after the murder. The ethics of those reporters were questioned at the time in light of a 2010 UNESCO report "Ethical Reporting on and for Children". Prime Minister Sheikh Hasina criticised the news media for both interviewing the couple's son and for destroying evidence.

=== Protests by journalists ===
The murder of the two journalists unified reporters across Bangladesh. The Bangladesh Federal Union of Journalists and Dhaka Union of Journalists, which had been separate since 1992, began to work together to organise rallies, actions such as hunger strikes, panel discussions, and lobbying efforts to pressure politicians and police for action.

The mobilisation of journalists began immediately after their murder and funerals. The Dhaka Union of Journalists rallied as early as 12 February. The Bangladesh Federal Union of Journalists, Dhaka Union of Journalists, National Press Club, Dhaka Reporters Unity, and Crime Association Bangladesh united for a human chain and nationwide rally on 22 February.

Journalists held a symbolic hunger strike and work stoppage for one hour on 27 February 2012. Further hunger strikes were held on 1 March and 23 December.

They held another grand rally around 18 March 2012 in different districts and a further sit-in on 8 April.

After the Home Minister Sahara Khatun assured them the police would produce results in the case soon, journalists stood down.

On 5 June 2012, journalists delivered written correspondence for the Speaker in support of laws to protect the safety of journalists.

On 26 June 2012, journalists marched toward the prime minister's office.

In addition, the journalists organised panel discussions on their professional perspective about the Sagar-Runi case and its handling by the police and government. On the first anniversary, a panel of journalists was assembled with participation by Monjurul Ahsan Bulbul, Boishakhi TV CEO; A B M Musa, a columnist for Prothom Alo; Samakal editor Golam Sarowar; Shahed Chowdhury, who is president of Dhaka Reporters Unity; Iqbal Sobhan Chowdhury, editor of The Bangladesh Observer and president of the BFUJ; Ruhul Amin Gazi, a president within the BFUJ organisation; Kamal Uddin Sabuj, president of the Jatiya Press Club; and Syed Abdal Ahmad with the Jatiya Press Club.

Journalists clashed with Home Minister Muhiuddin Khan Alamgir when he made negative remarks at a press conference about the families' lack of co-operation that journalists said were unfounded. Alamgir had prefaced his remarks by going off the record and withdrew his statement when journalists reacted to his assertion.

=== European protests ===
In Germany, Bangladeshi expatriates, Germans, and citizens from other European countries met in Frankfurt and Bonn and protested the lack of results in the double murder investigation. The protesters were attempting to create publicity to get the attention of the United Nations and EU politicians. A human chain was formed around the UN building in Bonn.

=== Reactions ===
Irina Bokova, director-general of UNESCO, said the murder of the couple was "an intolerable attack on the profession and on the fundamental human right for freedom of expression."

The International Federation of Journalists (IFJ) released the following statement: "Journalists in Bangladesh have waged a long and arduous battle to improve security conditions, and the IFJ believes that this terrible double murder threatens to set back gains achieved in recent months and years."

Information Minister Hasanul Haq Inu said, "The killing of all the journalists, including Sagar-Runi, is disgraceful for democracy, and our duty is to remove it."

After one year with no progress in the case, Nowsher Alam Roman, Runi's brother, said, "For the last year, we have been struggling with agony, frustration and fear. Words fail to make any sense of our sufferings. All these days we have been continuously pacified by fake sympathy and promises of capturing the perpetrators and ensuring justice."

The IFJ-Asia Pacific released another statement at the one-year mark: "We share the anguish of our Bangladeshi colleagues, at the slow pace of investigations and the failure to establish any manner of motive for this brutal double murder."

The Daily Star published an editorial summing up sentiment: "... today it is not just the families of Sagar and Runi but also people across the spectrum who remain skeptical about the authorities being able to actually take the matter to a definitive, credible conclusion."

In 2012, in an end-of-the-year, unsigned editorial, the Dhaka Courier wrote, "The gruesome murder of the journalist couple Sagar-Runi still remains unresolved and this will be taken to the coming year by the media with force. The government has failed totally in providing any satisfactory explanation for the murder of the journalists, though from time to time an array of salacious motives were mentioned along with the names of prominent men."

Saleha Manir, who is Sagar Sarowar's mother, addressed journalists at a rally, "The government had declared a 48-hour ultimatum to arrest the murderers. I want to know, how many days more will I have to count to see full 48 hours?"

== Notable quotations/statements ==
The following quotes were widely reported or the source of additional commentary after their expression:

Home Minister Sahara Khatun told law enforcement to arrest the Sagar-Runi murderers within 48 hours.

Mirza Fakhrul Islam Alamgir, a BNP leader and opponent of the ruling Awami League party, said, "... the country is turning into a slaughter ground gradually. This brutal killing again proves there is no law and order and rule of law in the country."

Prime Minister Sheikh Hasina: "Government can't guard one's bedroom."

== Exhibits ==
- Sagar-Runi: Crime Scene, Do Not Cross, an exhibition of photographs, documents, and personal possessions about the Sagar-Runi family and their case, 11–13 February 2013, Drik Gallery, Dhanmondi Thana, Dhaka, Bangladesh.

== In popular culture ==
In 2025, Bangladesh film director Raihan Rafi released Omimangshito. A film which depicted the murder and mystery. It was released on iScreen, an online streaming platform.

== See also ==
- List of journalists killed in Bangladesh
- List of unsolved murders (2000–present)
