= Arnav =

Arnav, Arnab, or Arnov is a first name popular in India, and means "ocean" in Sanskrit. Arnab is the Bengali, Odia, and Assamese form of the name. It also means "rabbit" in Arabic and Hebrew. Notable people with the name include:

- Arnab Basu (fl. 2000s), game designer, video-games producer; known for Tomb Raider series
- Arnab Chakrabarty (born 1980), classical musician and sarod player
- Arnab Chanda (born 1981), English born actor, writer, and director
- Arnab Das Sharma (born 1987), Indian footballer
- Arnab Goswami (born 1973), Indian journalist
- Arnab Mondal (born 1989), Indian footballer
- Arnab Nandi (born 1987), Indian first-class cricketer
- Arnab Rai Choudhuri (born 1956), Indian scientist
- Arnav (TV actor) (born Amjath Khan, 1989), Tamil television actor
- Arnav Kapur (fl. 2010s–2020s), computer scientist and engineer at MIT
- Arnav Sinha (born 1995), Indian cricketer

== See also ==
- El Arnab, traditional Arab solitaire
- Arnave, commune in the Ariège department of southwestern France
