= The Russell Exchange =

Auction house in Kolkata, India

- Interactive map of the The Russell Exchange area

General information
- Location: Kolkata, West Bengal, 12 C, Russel St, Park Street, India
- Coordinates: 22.552365°N 88.350929°E
- Completed: 1940

The Russell Exchange is an auction house in Kolkata, India. Founded in 1940, the auction house is one of the oldest in Asia.

== History ==
The Russell Exchange, believed to be Asia’s oldest auction house and the last in Kolkata, dates back to the 1940 when the current owners’ great-grandfather acquired it from the original owner Mr. Russell. Siblings Anwar Salim, Arshad Salim, and Sarfaraz Begum Shamsi are the current owners of the auction house. Salim and Arshad's father, Abdul Majid, along with his partner, Amrit Lalji, inherited and managed the business until Lalji retired 20 years ago. Salim then acquired Lalji’s share, and the ownership now rests with the siblings.

== Location ==
The auction house is located on Russell Street in Kolkata, India. Located on the ground floor, Russell Exchange hosts weekly Sunday auctions. In addition, it offers vintage furniture for direct sale to customers and rents items as props for film and television productions.

== In media ==
- The Auction House—A Tale Of Two Brothers by Edward Owles in 2014.
