= Irfan Sajjad =

Bangladeshi film actor

- ইরফান সাজ্জাদ
- Born: January 5, 1989 (age 37); Mohra, Chittagong, Bangladesh
- Education: Chittagong City College
- Occupations: Actor, model
- Years active: 2013–present
- Spouse: Sharmin Sajjad

Irfan Sajjad is a Bangladeshi model and actor. His break came when he won the 2013 season of reality show Fair and Handsome – The Ultimate Man. Since then he has appeared in numerous TV programs and several films.

== Early life ==
Sajjad was born on 5 January 1989 in the Mohra Ward of Chittagong. He went the A.L. Khan High School in Chittagong and later studied at the Chittagong City College.

== Career ==
After winning the reality show Fair and Handsome – The Ultimate Man in 2013, Sajjad started his career as an actor in the last scene of telefilm Bhalobashar Golpo by Mabrur Rashid Bannah. He went on to act in many other telefilms and drama serials.

Sajjad made his big screen debut in director Alvi Ahmed's 2015 film U-Turn. His second film, released in 2016, was Mushfiqur Rahman Gulzar's low-budget Mon Jane Na Moner Thikana. He co-starred with Bidya Sinha Mim in Tania Ahmed's Bhalobasha Emoni Hoy, which was released on 27 January 2017.

== Television ==
- Unmarried (2016)
- Bideshi Bou (2016)
- Amar Biye (2017)
- Shada Kagoje Shajano Onuvuti (2017)
- Betar Bhalobasha
- Bachelor Point (2018)
- Rider Love Story (2022)
- Mon Poray (2022)
- Tabiz Kora Premik (2022)
- Poriname Tumi (2022)
- Colony Lover (2022)
- Nayok (2022)
- Ami Bhalobashi Toke (2022)
- Biye Korlei Shob Thik (2022)
- Songhar (2022)
- Notun Thikanay (2022)
- Seasonal Chor (2022)
- Good Night (2022)
- Ghurni (2022)
- Ki Kore Toke Bolbo (2022)
- Mohila Sublet Abosshok (2022)
- Social Media Syndrome (2022)
- Bhangoner Por (2022)
- Being Woman (2022)
- Prem Korite Icchuk (2022)
- Daring Wife Fearing Husband (2022)
- One Way (2022)
- Takar Machine (2022)
- Love and War (2022)
- Nila Dekechilo (2022)
- Sokal Bikal Ratri (2022)
- Tomake (2022)
- Shesh Bikeler Meye (2022)
- Sweet Sixteen (2022)
- Tomar Kacha Kachi (2022)
- Rupkothar Pathsaala (2022)
- Ebar Pujoy (2022)
- Aghaat (2022)
- Bhoy Korona (2022)
- Charulotar Nikhoj Songbad (2022)
- Shesher Agey (2022)
- Ex Jokhon Husband (2022)
- Naamhin Shomprko (2022)
- English Rana (2022)
- Ekti Pore Live A Ashchi (2022)
- Only Bou Is Real (2022)
- Rocky Bhai (2022)
- Bharprapto Boyfriend (2022)
- Moner Moto (2022)
- Ghumhin Rater Golpo (2022)

== Filmography ==
Key
†	Denotes films that have not yet been released

Year	Title	Role	Notes	Ref.
2015	U-Turn	Saif Khan	Debut film	
2016	Mon Jane Na Moner Thikana	Dr. Imran Hasan		
2017	Tumi Robe Nirobe	Nirob		
2017	Valobasha Emoni Hoy	Sajjad		
2018	Iti, Tomari Dhaka	Actor	Anthology film; cameo appearance in segment of 'The Background Artist'	
2024	Voyal	Sujon		
2025	Ali	Ali		
2026	Thikana Bangladesh †	TBA	Post-production	

=== Web series ===
Year	Title	Role	OTT	Notes	Ref.
2019	Eternal Gift		Bioscope		
2021	Aghaat		Watcho		
2021–2022	Friendbook	Shaker	NTV		
2025–2026	Eta Amaderi Golpo	Fahad	Channel i	Nominated– Meril-Prothom Alo Awards for Best Actor in TV Series	
2026	Kormofol	Shimul	YouTube		

=== Short films ===
- Commitment (2020)
- Ek Bhai Chompa (2021)
- Ki Ekta Obostha (2021)
- Proxy (2021)
- Jhilik (2021)
- Ar Theko Na Durey (2022)
- Oprokashito (2022)
