= Path Jana Nai =

Bangladeshi television drama

- Genre: Family drama Serial drama Romance
- Created by: Fakhrul Alam
- Written by: Ahmed Zaman Chowdhury
- Directed by: Syed Zamim
- Starring: Ziaul Faruq Apurba; Sadia Jahan Prova; Tanzika Amin
- Theme music composer: S.I. Tutul
- Opening theme: Poth Jana Nai
- Composer: Biplab Barua
- Country of origin: Bangladesh
- Original language: Bengali
- No. of episodes: 52

Production
- Production location: Dhaka, Bangladesh
- Editor: Nayan Mahmood
- Camera setup: Multi-Camera
- Running time: 20 minutes
- Production companies: Projapati Jar; ATN Entertainment

Original release
- Network: ATN Bangla
- Release: 1 November 2010 – 19 September 2011

Poth Jana Nai (English: There's no known way) is a Bangladeshi television drama serial, originally aired on the ATN Bangla from 1 November 2010, to 9 September 2011, with prime slot for Monday, comprising a total 52 episodes. The drama is directed by Syed Zamim and written by Ahmed Zaman Chowdhury.

== Plot ==
The story builds up around an elite family in Dhaka. Shahid and Zahid Mahmood are two sons of late Barrister Arshad Mahmood. Shahid Mahmood, the oldest son is an established and Lawyer, who lives with his wife and mom. Zahid Mahmood is the younger son, who is on the process of getting his law degree. During the first episode, It is shown that Shahid also have an extramarital affair with Shakila, despite being married for a long time. Shakila, facing constant pressure from few powerful real estate businessman, looks to Shahid for legal help. After going to court, the companies faces huge loss due to losing the legal battle, and conspires to kill him. Few days after, Shahid gets into a car accident and dies. Years later, Zahid returns from London as a lawyer, and decides to open an investigation case for his brother's death, while the family decides to get their younger son married to their Shahid's widowed wife, despite their disapproval.

== Cast ==
- Ziaul Faruq Apurba as Shahid Mahmood / Zahid Mahmood
- Sadia Jahan Prova as Yasmeen
- Tanzika Amin as Shakila
- Inamul Haque
- Dilara Zaman
- Syed Hasan Imam
- Atikur Rahman
- Munia Islam
- Raisul Islam
- Monira Mithu
- Nafisa Ferdous
