= Wind of Change (Bangladeshi TV program) =

Bangladeshi music television series

- উইন্ড অফ চেঞ্জ
- Created by: Kaushik Hossain Taposh
- Composer: Kaushik Hossain Taposh
- Country of origin: Bangladesh
- No. of seasons: 8
- No. of episodes: 117

Production
- Producers: Kaushik Hossain Taposh; Farzana Arman Munny
- Production locations: Dhaka, Bangladesh
- Running time: 90 minutes
- Production company: TM Production

Original release
- Network: Gaan Bangla
- Release: 7 July 2016 – 21 March 2023

Wind of Change was a Bangladeshi music television series. It showcased a mix of local and international musicians performing together. It first premiered on Gaan Bangla during Eid al-Fitr on 7 May 2016. The series was created by Kaushik Hossain Taposh, who produces it with Farzana Arman Munny.

== Instrumentalists ==
Name	Country	Instrument
Adelina Jureciva		vocal
Alicja Chrzaszcz		violin
Andreea Runceanu	Romania	violin
Andrew Krasilnikov		saxophone
Anna Emelianova		soprano
Anna Kapul		cello
Anna Rakita	Russia	violin
Anna Savchenko	Russia	vocal
Anna Wibe	Latvia	piano
Anthony James Parker		drums
Anton Davidyants	Russia	bass guitar
Artyom Manukyan		cello
Arshad Khan		esraj
Daniel Cressars	Spain	guitar
Denis Popov	Russia	drums
Gergő Borlai	Hungary	drums
Jalal Ahmed	Bangladesh	flute
Jasmine Khan	Austria	vocal
Kseniya Gerasimchuk	Russia	violin
Marco Minnemann	Germany	drums
Mohini Dey	India	bass guitar
Namrata Barman	Bangladesh	vocal
Natasha Popova	Russia	violin
Nelli Bubujanca	Latvia	drums
Polina Sedova	Russia	guitar
Purbayan Chatterjee	India	sitar
Rhythm Shaw	India	guitar
Ron "Bumblefoot" Thal	United States	guitar
Pavel Areen	Bangladesh	drums
Ruslana Mamchenko	Ukraine	violin
Sandip Chatterjee		santoor
Sanjoy Das	India	guitar
Sinan Ayyildiz	Turkey	saz
Sivamani	India	percussions
Uppalapu Rajesh	India	mandolin
Valeri Tolstov		flute

== Episodes ==
=== Pre-Season 1 (2016) ===
Pre-Season One of Wind of Change aired on 7 July 2016 and has a total of 20 episodes with Taposh being featured in Behaya Mon, Tip Tip Brishti, Nouka, Dil Ki Doya Hoy Na, Nacho and Pagla Ghora. The first 14 seconds of the tune of Behaya Mon was used for the Pre-Season 1 Intro.

#	Release date (Note: This column only contains digitally broadcast dates of song/episode.)	Song(s)	Artist(s)	Lyricist	Language(s)	Ref.
1	8 July 2016	Bhalobashbo	Habib Wahid	Juwel Mahmud	Bangla	
2	8 July 2016	Gotokaal Raatey	Ayub Bachchu	Bappy Khan	Bangla	
3	8 July 2016	The Musical Priest	Anton Davidyants, Anna Rakita		English	
4	8 July 2016	Behaya Mon	Chisty Baul, Kaushik Hossain Taposh & Resmi Mirza		Bangla	
5	8 July 2016	Morey Jaabo	Chirkutt (Sharmin Sultana Sumi)		Bangla	
6	8 July 2016	Tip Tip Brishty	Tonmoy Tansen & Kaushik Hossain Taposh		Bangla	
7	8 July 2016	Shobuz Jokhon	Shubhashish Mazumder Bappa	Sheik Abdullah Al Matin Rana	Bangla	
8	9 July 2016	Lukochuri	Balam		Bangla	
9	9 July 2016	Shopnobhongo	Miles (Shafin Ahmed)	Mahmud Khurshid	Bangla	
10	9 July 2016	Ami Aakash Hobo	Fahmida Nabi	Sayed Hasan Tipu	Bangla	
11	9 July 2016	Nouka	Pantha Kanai & Tashfia Fatima Tashfee		Bangla	
12	10 July 2016	Luminous Sorrow	Anton Davidyants, Anna Rakita		English	
13	10 July 2016	Dhiki Dhiki	Miles (Shafin Ahmed)	Mahmud Khurshid	Bangla	
14	10 July 2016	Khepa Gaan	Aditarians (Adit Rahman) & Balam		Bangla	
15	10 July 2016	Shei Tumi	Ayub Bachchu	Ayub Bachchu	Bangla	
16	12 July 2016	Kobita	Samina Chowdhury	Abu Hena Mostafa Kamal	Bangla	
17	12 July 2016	Chaina Meye	Hridoy Khan	Ahmed Risvy	Bangla	
18	12 July 2016	Dil Ki Doya Hoy Na	Fatima Tuz Zahra Oyshee & Kaushik Hossain Taposh	Traditional	Bangla	
19	12 July 2016	Nacho	Mila Islam & Towfique Ahmed	Mila Islam	Bangla	
20	12 July 2016	Pagla Ghora	Tashfia Fatima Tashfee, Kaushik Hossain Taposh, Kuddus Boyati & ABD	Traditional	Bangla	

=== Pre-Season 2 (2016) ===
Pre-Season 2 of Wind of Change aired on 10 September 2016 and has a total of 16 episodes with Taposh being featured in every episode except Jaadur Shohor, Rath Nirghum and Taarai Taarai.

#	Release date	Song(s)	Artist(s)	Lyricist	Language(s)	Ref.
21	14 September 2016	Achen Amar Muktar	Syed Abdul Hadi	Gazi Mazharul Anwar	Bangla	
22	14 September 2016	Chabi Maira	Makhon Mia, Kaushik Hossain Taposh, Tashfia Fatima Tashfee, ABD, Billal	Alauddin Boyati	Bangla	
23	14 September 2016	Hairey Manush	Andrew Kishore	Syed Shamsul Huq	Bangla	
24	14 September 2016	Mira Bhai	Faruq Mahfuz Anam James	Faruq Mahfuz Anam James & Marzuk Russell	Bangla	
25	14 September 2016	Jaadur Shohor	Chirkutt (Sharmin Sultana Sumi)		Bangla	
26	14 September 2016	Raat Nirghum	Habib Wahid	Shaquie Ahmed	Bangla	
27	16 September 2016	Chumki & Miss Lanka	Khurshid Alam	Dewan Nazrul & Ahmaduzzaman Chowdhury	Bangla	
28	16 September 2016	Ei Brishti Bheja Raate	Dilshad Nahar Kona	Ahmaduzzaman Chowdhury	Bangla	
29	16 September 2016	Ki Jaala	Balam	Taposh & Shakhawat Al Mamun	Bangla	
30	16 September 2016	Shaada Diley Kada	Kaushik Hossain Taposh & Mujib Pardeshi	Saidul Islam	Bangla	
31	17 September 2016	Ami Ure Jete Chai & Ek Paye Nupur	Dilshad Karim Elita & Rashed Uddin Ahmed Topu	Fuad Al Muqtadir & Rashed Uddin Ahmed Topu	Bangla	
32	17 September 2016	Behaya Mon 2	Christy Baul & Kaushik Hossain Taposh	Shamsel Haque Christy	Bangla	
33	17 September 2016	Ei Je Duniya	Ferdous Wahid & Kaushik Hossain Taposh	Momtaz Ali Khan	Bangla	
34	17 September 2016	Maya Lagaisey	Kaushik Hossain Taposh	Shah Abdul Karim	Bangla	
35	17 September 2016	Shomoy Gele Shadhon Hobena	Tashfia Fatima Tashee, Jalal Ahmed, Billal, Makhon Mia & Kaushik Hossain Taposh	Fakir Lalon Shah	Bangla	
36	17 September 2016	Taarai Taarai	Faruq Mahfuz Anam James		Bangla	

=== Season 1 (2017) ===
After two Pre-Seasons, 'Wind of Change' released its first season on 25 June 2017 and has a total of 17 episodes with Taposh being featured in every episode.

#	Release date	Song(s)	Artist(s)	Lyricist	Language(s)	Ref.
37	27 June 2017	Kotobaro Bhebechinu	Rezwana Choudhury Bannya	Rabindranath Tagore	Bangla	
38	28 June 2017	Brishti Pore	Shubhashish Mazumder Bappa	Sheik Abdullah Al Matin Rana	Bangla	
39	28 June 2017	Fire Asho Na	Mahmudul Haque Imran	Snahashish Ghosh	Bangla	
40	28 June 2017	Graamer Nawjowan	Kuddus Boyati	Shah Abdul Karim	Bangla	
41	28 June 2017	Jibonanondo	Niaz Mohammad Chowdhury	Shawkat Osman	Bangla	
42	28 June 2017	Nizamuddin Auliya	Fatima Tuz Zahra Oyshee	Hasan Chisty Baul	Bangla	
43	28 June 2017	Okarone Tulshir Mule	Kala Miah	Kala Miah	Bangla	
44	28 June 2017	Pakhi Re Tui	Subir Nandi	Khan Ataur Rahman	Bangla	
45	28 June 2017	Rage Against People's Ethics	A.B.D.	A.B.D.	English	
46	28 June 2017	Rojoni	Bari Siddiqui	Azad Miah	Bangla	
47	29 June 2017	Khachar Bhitor Ochin Pakhi	Makhon Mia, Kaushik Hossain Taposh, Kamal, Billal	Lalon	Bangla	
48	29 June 2017	Mushkil-E-Asaan	Shah Alam Sarkar & Pritom Hasan	Lutfor Hassan	Bangla	
49	29 June 2017	O Sokhina	Fakir Alamgir	Altaf Ali Hashu	Bangla	
50	29 June 2017	Porer Jaaiga Porer Jomin	Kaushik Hossain Taposh	Abdul Latif	Bangla	
51	29 June 2017	Praaner Cheye Priyo	Protic Hasan	Ahmed Imtiaz Bulbul	Bangla	
52	29 June 2017	Uchatono Mon	Taufiq Ahmed Priyo	Kazi Nazrul Islam	Bangla	
53	5 July 2017	Jekhane Simanto Tomaar	Kumar Bishwajit	Kausar Ahmed Chaudhury	Bangla	

=== Season 2 (2017) ===
The second season of 'Wind of Change' aired on 31 August 2017 and has a total of 12 episodes with Taposh being featured in every episode except for Jochona & Obujh Bhalobasha.

#	Release date	Song(s)	Artist(s)	Lyricist	Language(s)	Ref.
54	3 September 2017	Aami Brishtir Kaach Thekey	Subir Nandi	Gazi Abdur Razzak	Bangla	
55	3 September 2017	Ekti Gondhomer Laagiya	Jan-E-Alam	Jan-E-Alam	Bangla	
56	3 September 2017	Tumi Kon Kanoner Phool	Adity Mohsin	Rabindranath Tagore	Bangla	
57	4 September 2017	Aamar Ekta Nodi Chilo	Pathik Nabi	Pathik Nabi	Bangla	
58	5 September 2017	Aamar Gaye Joto Dukkho Shoy	Bari Siddiqui	Ukil Munshi	Bangla	
59	5 September 2017	Aami Tomakei Bole Debo	Kaushik Hossain Taposh & Shubhashish Mazumder Bappa	Sanjeeb Choudhury	Bangla	
60	6 September 2017	Dojokh	Belal Khan	Shomeshwar Oli	Bangla	
61	6 September 2017	Jodi Thaakey Nosibey	Chishty Baul	Chishty Baul	Bangla	
62	7 September 2017	Aamar Apon Cheye	Zinia Zafrin Luipa	Kazi Nazrul Islam	Bangla	
63	7 September 2017	Mone Jaare Chaay	Shamim Hasan	Golam Kibria	Bangla	
64	8 September 2017	Jochona	Aditarians (Aditi Rahman Dola)	Shomeshwar Oli	Bangla	
65	10 September 2017	Obujh Bhalobasha	Hridoy Khan	Maliha Tajnin Tani	Bangla	

=== Season 3 (2018) ===
The third season of 'Wind of Change' aired on 15 June 2018 and has a total of 22 episodes with Taposh being featured in every episode except for Nitol Paye & Arale Arale.

#	Release date	Song(s)	Artist(s)	Lyricist	Language(s)	Ref.
66	17 June 2018	Agun Lagaiya Dilo Koney	Kaushik Hossain Taposh	Hason Raja	Bangla	
67	17 June 2018	Anondoloke	Rezwana Choudhury Bannya	Rabindranath Tagore	Bangla	
68	18 June 2018	Hridoy Jure	Chandan Zaman Ali	Chandan Zaman Ali	Bangla	
69	18 June 2018	Komolay Nritto Kore	Jasmine Khan & Reshmi Mirza		Bangla	
70	19 June 2018	O Amar Desher Mati	Sujit Mustafa	Rabindranath Tagore	Bangla	
71	20 June 2018	Eki Ashimo Piyasha	Tanveer Alam Shawjeeb	Kazi Nazrul Islam	Bangla	
72	20 June 2018	Papri Keno Bojhena	Mizanur Rahman	Azam Khan	Bangla	
73	20 June 2018	Jhoom	Minar Rahman	Minar Rahman	Bangla	
74	21 June 2018	Beder Meye Josna	Andrew Kishore & Zinia Zafrin Luipa	Tozammel Haque Bokul	Bangla	
75	21 June 2018	Takdum Takdum Bajai	Kiran Chandra Roy	Meera Dev Burman	Bangla	
76	22 June 2018	Amar Shopno Gulo	Khan Asifur Rahman Agun	Khan Asifur Rahman Agun	Bangla	
77	22 June 2018	Ami Faisa Gechi	Hyder Husyn	Hyder Husyn	Bangla	
78	22 June 2018	Ek Hridoyhinar Kachey	Rafiqul Alam	Abdul Hye Al Hadi	Bangla	
79	22 June 2018	Tomar Khola Hawa	Sahana Bajpaie	Rabindranath Tagore	Bangla	
80	24 June 2018	Buri Hoilam Tor Karone	Kangalini Sufia	Shaikh Wahidur Rahman	Bangla	
81	24 June 2018	Geeti Kobita 2	Maqsoodul Haque	Maqsoodul Haque	Bangla	
82	25 June 2018	Matwali	Shireen Jawad	Al Mamun Chowdhury	Bangla	
83	26 June 2018	Nitol Paye	Moidul Islam Khan Shuvo	Rajib Rahman	Bangla	
84	27 June 2018	Amar Proticchobi	Saidus Salehin Khaled Sumon	Saidus Salehin Khaled Sumon	Bangla	
85	28 June 2018	Arale Arale	Taufiq Ahmed Priyo & Shamim Hasan	Bulleh Shah	Bangla	
86	28 June 2018	Keu Firey Na Khali Haate	Makhon Mia		Bangla	
87	29 June 2018	Haate Haat Chui	Kaushik Hossain Taposh	Srijato	Bangla	

=== Season 4 (2018) ===
The fourth season of 'Wind of Change' aired in 2018 & 2019 and has a total of 9 episodes with Taposh being featured in every episode except for Tumi Hina.

#	Release date	Song(s)	Artist(s)	Lyricist	Language(s)	Ref.
88	23 August 2018	Ekta Shorol Onko	Shafkat Ahmed Dipto	Shafkat Ahmed Dipto	Bangla	
89	30 August 2018	Beimaan Pakhi	Mannan Mohammad	Ishak Sarkar	Bangla	
90	31 August 2018	Tumi Amar Ghum	Sainik	Sohel Arman	Bangla	
91	4 September 2018	Ami Chini Go Chini	Kaderi Kibria	Rabindranath Tagore	Bangla	
92	5 September 2018	Charidikey Kolahol	Milon Mahmood	Milon Mahmood	Bangla	
93	26 September 2018	Nishi Bhor Holo	Ferdous Ara	Kazi Nazrul Islam	Bangla	
94	14 February 2019	Tumi Hina	Fairooz Nazifa	Cyrus Zulkernain	Bangla	
95	22 February 2019	Abar Dekha Holey	Mesbah Ahmed	Mesbah Ahmed	Bangla	

=== Season 5 (2019) ===
The fifth season was aired on 6 June 2019 and has a total of 8 episodes with Taposh being featured in every episode.

#	Release date	Song(s)	Artist(s)	Lyricist	Language(s)	Ref.
96	6 June 2019	Aamay Dekona	Aditi Singh Sharma	Kausar Ahmed Chaudhury	Bangla	
97	6 June 2019	Allah Nobijir Naam	Syed Hasanur Rahman	Ahmed Risvy	Bangla	
98	6 June 2019	Daak Diyachen Doyal Amarey	Kailash Kher	Ismail Hossain Shiraji	Bangla	
99	6 June 2019	Orey Neel Doriya	Papon	Mukul Chowdhury	Bangla	
100	7 June 2019	Tomar Chokhey Akash Amar	Arfin Rumey	Zahid Akbar	Bangla	
101	7 June 2019	Aaj Ei Brishtir Kanna Dekhey	Papon	Kausar Ahmed Chaudhury	Bangla	
102	7 June 2019	Milon Hobey Koto Diney	Kailash Kher		Bangla	
103	7 June 2019	Manush Ekta Dui Chakkhar Cycle	Shah Alam Sarkar	Monir Hossain Sarkar	Bangla	

=== Season 6 (2020) ===
The sixth season of 'Wind of Change' aired in 2020 and has a total of 12 episodes with Taposh being featured in every episode.

#	Release date	Song(s)	Artist(s)	Lyricist	Language(s)	Ref.
104	26 May 2020	Nisha Lagilo Re	Tashfee & Papon	Hason Raja	Bangla	
105	26 May 2020	Mor Bhabonarey	Aditi Singh Sharma	Rabindranath Tagore	Bangla	
106	26 May 2020	Ei Ki Premer Protidaan	Shahjahan Munshi	Alauddin Boyati	Bangla	
107	26 May 2020	Mast Qalandar & Chaabi Maira	Kailash Kher & Mizanur Rahman	Bulleh Shah & Alauddin Boyati	Urdu & Bangla	
108	27 May 2020	Tumi Arekbar Ashia	Rathindranath Roy	Gazi Mazharul Anwar	Bangla	
109	27 May 2020	Tomar Jonno	Balam	Zahid Pintu	Bangla	
110	27 May 2020	Ekhon Onek Raat	Ayub Bachchu	Bappy Khan	Bangla	
111	27 May 2020	Shukhey Theko	Tonmoy Tansen	Moniruzzaman Monir	Bangla	
112	28 May 2020	Baba Bhandari	Parvez Sazzad	Kabiyal Ramesh Shil	Bangla	
113	28 May 2020	Majhey Majhey Tobo	Mahtim Shakib Rahman	Rabindranath Tagore	Bangla	
114	28 May 2020	Prem Jeno Ek Projapoti	Niaz Mohammad Chowdhury	Nazrul Islam Babu	Bangla	
115	28 May 2020	Porodeshi Megh	Zinia Zafrin Luipa	Kazi Nazrul Islam	Bangla	

=== 2022 ===
#	Release date	Song(s)	Artist(s)	Lyricist	Language(s)	Ref.
116	8 April 2022	Kanar Haat Bazar	Mosiur Rahman Rinku	Monmohon Dutta	Bangla	

=== 2023 ===
#	Release date	Song(s)	Artist(s)	Lyricist	Language(s)	Ref.
117	21 March 2023	Dui Kuley Sultan	Fatima Tuz Zahra Oyshee	Abdul Gafur Hali	Bangla	
