= Robiul Islam Jibon =

Bangladeshi lyricist and journalist

- রবিউল ইসলাম জীবন
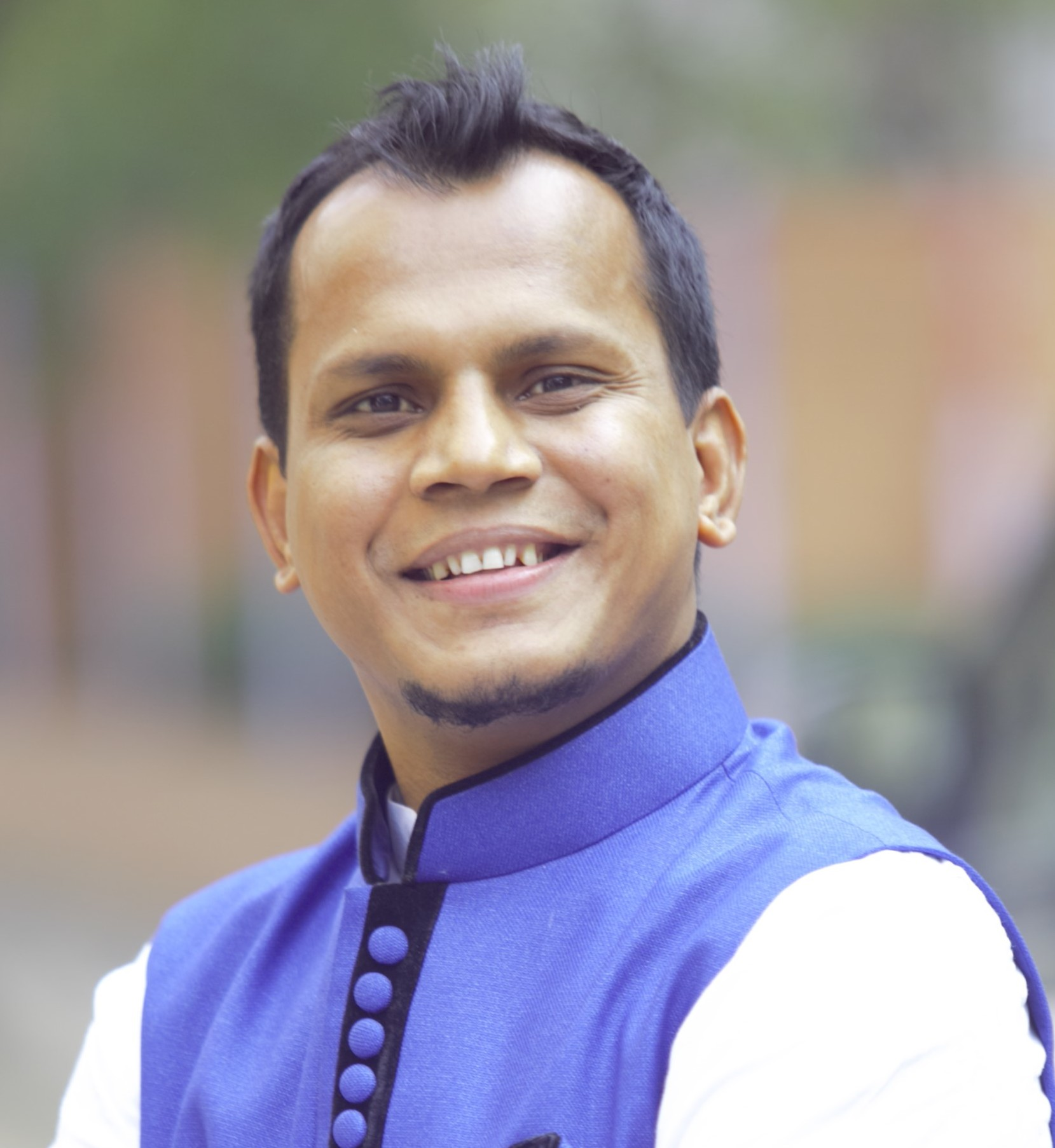
- Robiul Islam Jibon in 2019
- Born: 1985 (age 40–41); Begumganj, Noakhali, Bangladesh
- Other name: Jibon
- Education: Government Titumir College
- Occupations: Lyricist & Journalist
- Years active: 2006-present
- Employer: CZN24.Com
- Spouse: Tasnima Aktab
- Children: 1
- Awards: full list

Robiul Islam (born 1985), Better known as Robiul Islam Jibon, is a Bangladeshi lyricist and journalist. He won the National Film Awards 2022, for his Lyrics Dheere Dheere, From The film Poran. He also won Channel i Music Awards for Best Lyricist in 2009, 2010 and 2015.

== Early life ==
Jibon was born and brought up in Hazipur village of Begumganj, Noakhali. His father died when he was 4 years old. He completed Secondary School Certificate (SSC) from Hazipur A. M. High School in 2001 and Higher Secondary Certificate (HSC) from Government College of Commerce, Chittagong in 2003. He obtained his bachelor's degree in business studies in 2007 from Government Titumir College and a master's in accounting in 2009 from Government Bangla College.

== Career ==
Jibon has debut as a lyricist with Asif Akbar's album Hridoye Roktokhoron in December 2006. He made his debut in writing film songs through the 2010 film Takar Cheye Prem Boro starring Shakib Khan and Apu Biswas.

With nearly 1,000 released songs to his credit, 37 of Jibon's songs have each surpassed 10 million views on YouTube. Among them, "Jonom Jonom", performed by Imran Mahmudul and Sabrina Porshi, and "Konna", from the film Jinn 3 and performed by Imran Mahmudul and Dilshad Nahar Kona, have both crossed the 100-million-view mark on the platform.

== Sports and Songwriting ==
Sports has been a recurring inspiration in Jibon's songwriting, particularly in cricket and football. He has written More than 25 sports-themed songs, including Jole Utho Bangladesh, composed to inspire the Bangladesh national cricket team ahead of the 2011 Cricket World Cup. The song gained widespread popularity and was played at stadiums in Bangladesh, Sri Lanka and the United Arab Emirates. On 19 February 2025, a line from the song was featured in a post about Bangladeshi footballer Sheikh Morsalin on the official FIFA World Cup Facebook page.

His other notable sports compositions include Joy Hobei Hobe, Mashrafe (2017), dedicated to former Bangladesh cricket captain Mashrafe Mortaza, and Oporajeyo (2018), about cricketer Shakib Al Hasan, who also appeared in its music video.

Jibon has attended nearly 200 international cricket and football matches in Bangladesh and abroad, including in Sri Lanka, the United Arab Emirates, India and Qatar. In December 2022, he watched the FIFA World Cup final in Qatar, where Argentina defeated France to win the title.

== Audio-Music Video ==
Jonom Jonom* — Imran & Porshi (Porshi-3)	Abdar* — Imran & Porshi (Single)
Eto Kache* — Kazi Shuvo & Puja (Monerai Akash)	Dil Diwana* — Kazi Shuvo & Swaralipi
Keu Na Januk* — Tahsan (Mon Karigor)	Pagli Suraiya* — Liza (Pagli Suraiya)
Deyale Deyale* — Minar (Deyale Deyale)	Hridoyer Simanay* — Imran & Naumi (Naumi)
Keno Eto Chai Toke* — Imran & Labiba (Single)	Mon Karigor — Tahsan (Mon Karigor)
Chupi Chupi* — Milan & Puja (Danakata Pori)	Bharatia Chai — Asif Akbar (Hridoye Roktokhoron)
Ami Nei Amate* — Imran & Brishti (Bolte Bolte Cholte Cholte)	Brishti Elei Aso Tumi — Kumar Bishwajit (Single)
Bou Ene De* — Kazi Shuvo (Single)	Opekkhar Por — Shoeb & Puja (Bhalo Thakar Icche)
Keno Bare Bare* — Imran & Puja (Puja Returns)	Obhiman — Hridoy Khan (Single)
Chokhta Theke Mukhta* — Kazi Shuvo & Purnota (Purnota)	Hridoye Tomar Thikana — Papon & Tamanna Prome (Single)
Na Bola Kotha 2* — Eleyas & Aurin (Na Bola Kotha-2)	Megheri Khame — Imran & Atiya Anisa (Single)
Ek Mutho Shopno* — Belal Khan & Mohona (Alapon)	Jodi — Mahtim Shakib (Single)
Mane Na Mon* — Imran & Puja (Tumi)	Mon Kharaper Akash — Iman Chakraborty (Single)
Ektu Ektu Kore* — Milan & Naumi (Imran featuring Milan)	Dolil — Nancy & Belal Khan (Khuti)
Sohe Na Jatona — Arfin Rumey (Bhalobashi Tomay)	Nodipoth — Bappa Mazumder (Boka Ghuri)
Jani Na Jani Na* — Imran & Oyshee (Oyshee Express)	Tumi Chokh Mele Takale — Imran & Oyshee (Oyshee Express)
Bhul Manusher Ghor* — Emon Khan (Single)	Boka Mon — Ankhi Alamgir (Boka Mon)
Bolo Sathia* — Imran & Brishti (Aaj Bhalobasho Na)	Lojja — Porshi (Porshi)
Kotha Ektai* — Imran & Porshi (Single)	Firbo Na Aj Bari — Asif Akbar & Munni (Firbo Na Aj Bari)
Chokheri Poloke* — Subhamita Banerjee & Rizvi Wahid (Prothom Shopno)	Koto Je Khujechi Tomay — Balam & Julee (Single)
Jabi Koto Dure* — Asif Akbar & Liza (Pagli Suraiya)	Megher Meye — Shafin Ahmed (Prachir)
Amar E Mon* — Imran (Single)	Aj Brishtir Din — Apu (Closeup One-2008)
Nishi Rate Chander Alo* — Imran (Mon Karigor)	Premer Pothe — Arfin Rumey (Bhalobashi Tomay)
Etota Bhalobashi* — Arfin Rumey & Naumi (Naumi)	Projapoti — Luipa (Single)
Kichu Kotha* — Imran & Brishti (Single)	Ek Pa Du Pa Kore — Tausif & Munni (Onidra)

== Films ==
Konna* — Imran Mahmudul & Kona (Jinn 3)	Amar Moton Ke Ache Bolo — Akassh (Mental)
Ratbhor* — Imran Mahmudul (Samrat)	Ashbe Amar Din — Rehaan Rasul (Toofan)
Mon Toke Chara* — Akassh (Bossgiri)	Khobor De — Arafat Mohsin (Taandob)
Kono Mane Nei To* — Imran & Nancy (Bossgiri)	Onek To Kotha Chilo — Zubeen Garg (Premi O Premi)
Ailo Re Ailo Re* — Baby Naznin (Takar Cheye Prem Boro)	Antaratma — Jubin Nautiyal (Antaratma)
Tomake Apon Kore* — Akassh (Super Hero)	Eka Aarale — Pinto Ghosh & Nancy (Antaratma)
Keno Ajkal* — Akassh (Chittagainga Powa Noakhailla Maiya)	Shotti Naki Bhul — Pritom Hasan (No Dorai)
Pori — Imran Mahmudul & Konal (Prince)	Jane Ei Mon Jane — Imran Mahmudul (Dhat Teri Ki)
Tumi Chara — Imran Mahmudul & Dola/Ishika (Rakkosh)	Bole Dao — Imran Mahmudul & Porshi (Sultana Bibiyana)
Dheere Dheere — Emon Chowdhury & Luipa (Poran)	Golmal — Limon (Television)

== Drama ==
Chhile Amar — Tahsan & Mithila (Kathopokothon)	Jaan Re — Dola Rahman & Sajib Dash (Jhora Bokul)
Agun — Imran Mahmudul & Kona (Golapi)	Tomar Jonno Ek Prithibi — Tahsin Ahmed (Tomar Jonno Ek Prithibi)
Jeyo Na Dure — Porshi & Avraal Sahir (Monjure)	Bhalobashi Tai Kache Asi — Dola Rahman & Bammi (Tobuo Bhalobashi)
Moneri Ronge Rangaiya — Arfin Rumey & Porshi (Moneri Ronge Rangaiya)	Dolchhut Projapoti — Runa Laila & Sabina Yasmin (Dolchhut Projapoti)
Ami Tomar Preme Porechhi — Imran Mahmudul & Atiya Anisha (Hridoyjure Tumi)	Agnipath — Jewel Morshed (Agnipath)

== Sports ==
Jole Otho Bangladesh* — Durbin (2011 Cricket World Cup)	Jite Libe — Naved featuring Dripto (Rajshahi Warriors)
Joy Hobei Hobe — Imran & Porshi (Bangladesh Cricket)	Mashrafe — Abrar Siam (Mashrafe Bin Mortaza)
Oporajeyo — Nemesis & Xefer (Shakib Al Hasan)	Play for the Game — Tausif (2011 Cricket World Cup)
Math Kapabe Dhaka — Shamim & Hasib (Dhaka Platoon)	Lorbe Ebar Bangladesh — Yusuf Riyad (2021 T20 World Cup)
Jitbo Amra — Tasnim Anika (2023 Cricket World Cup)	Praner Khela Football — Shilpi Bishwas (Bangladesh Football)

== Theme songs ==
Jholsano Mukh — Topu (acid attack survivors)	Amar Senabahini — Lincoln D'Costa (Bangladesh Army)
Shishur Jonno — Konal (children's rights)	Andharer Pata Ulte Dao — Various artists (theme song for Speak Out Foundation)
Lal-Neel Shopno — Tasnim Anika (underprivileged children)	Ekushey Boimela — Bappa Mazumder & Fahmida Nabi (book fair)
Egiye Jachchhe Nari — Various artists (women)	Mon Jabe Bari — Milon Mahmud (returning home)
Hese Othe Bangladesh — Liza & Atik (garment workers)	Notun Alor Jowar — Niloy & Nirob (Bangladesh Coast Guard)

(* Crore+ Views on YouTube)

== Studio Album ==
Year	Album	Singer	Tune/Composition	Label	Ref
2016	Mon Karigor	Tahsan & Imran Mahmudul	Imran Mahmudul	CD Choice	
2016	Bhalo Thakar Icche	Shoeb & Belal Khan	Belal Khan/Musfik Litu	CD Choice	
2015	Chayabazi	Zinia Zafrin Luipa	Kishore Das	CD Choice	
2015	Oyshee Express	Oyshee	Imran Mahmudul	Laser Vision	

== EP ==
Year	Album	Singer	Tune/Composition	Label	Ref
2018	Bhalo Thakte Dili Na	Ankon	Muhammad Milon/MMP Rony	Dhruba Music Station	
2017	Deho Khacha	Pantha Kanai	Rajesh Ghosh/Emon Chowdhury	CMV	
2017	Evabei	Tanjib Sarowar	Tanjib Sarowar/Emon Chowdhury	Laser Vision	
2017	Jotone	Nancy	Muhammad Milon/Rezwan Sheikh & Mmp Rony	Sangeeta	
2017	Beche Thakar Karon	Agun	Muhammad Milon/Mmp Rony	Sangeeta	
2017	Keu Ekjon	Shawon Gaanwala	Shawon Gaanwala/Amzad Hossain	CD Choice	
2017	Daga	Kazi Shuvo	Kazi Shuvo/Rafi Mohammad	CD Choice	
2017	Na Bujhe	Kazi Shuvo, Sajid & Rafi	Rafi Mohammad	CD Choice	
2016	Ek Ontorer Bhalobasha	Muhammad Milon	Muhammad Milon/MMP Rony	CD Choice	
2016	Deyale Deyale	Minar	Minar/Emon Chowdhury	CD Choice	
2016	Moner Pakhi Bone	Dilruba Khan	Rafi Mohammad	Laser Vision	
2016	DJ Rahat With Stars	Nancy, Kona, Julee, Konal & Oyshee	Meer Shahriar Hossain Masum & Riad Hasan/DJ Rahat	Adbox	

== Awards ==
Year	Awards	Category	Nominated work	Singer	Result	Ref
2025	RISBA Awards	Best Lyricist	Konna (Jinn-3)	Imran Mahmudul & Kona	Won	
2025	BCRA Awards	Best Lyricist	Konna (Jinn-3)	Imran Mahmudul & Kona	Won	
2022	Bangladesh National Film Awards	Best Lyricist	Dheere Dheere (Poran)	Emon Chowdhury & Luipa	won	
2015	Channel i Music Awards	Best Lyricist	Brishti	Oyshee	Won	
2011	Shako Telefilms Music Awards	Best Lyricist	Jole Utho Bangladesh	Doorbin	Won	
2010	Channel i Music Awards	Best Lyricist	Adhek	Annie Khan	Won	
2009	Channel i Music Awards	Best Lyricist	Meghla Obhiman	Julee	Won	
2007	MEJAB Performance Awards	Best Emerging Lyricist	Bharatia Chai	Asif Akbar	Won	
