= Zinia Zafrin Luipa =

Bangladeshi singer

Zinia Zafrin Luipa জিনিয়া জাফরিন লুইপা
- Born: Zinia Zafrin Luipa; 8 August 1992 (age 33); Bogura, Bangladesh
- Origin: Dhaka, Bangladesh
- Genres: Modern, Melody
- Occupation: Singer
- Instruments: Vocal, harmonium
- Years active: 2010 - present
- Label: CD Choice
- Spouse: Alamgir Hossain (m. 2013)

Zinia Zafrin Luipa (born 8 August 1992) is a Bangladeshi singer.

== Early life ==
Luipa was born in Bogura. She completed her SSC in 2007 and HSC in 2009 from Bogra Cantonment Public School and College. She was married to "Alamgir Hossain" in 2013. She has one Child.

== Career ==
Luipa started to learn singing when she was three years old. She could memorize a full song at the age of three so her parents thought her to learn music. Besides music she learned other arts like dance, acting, and reciting at Bangladesh Shishu Academy. She participated in lots of national competitions at an early age and got 14 gold medals in singing. She participated in "Notun Kuri" and "Shapla Kuri" and became champion. In 2010 she participated on Channel-i shera kontho and she was one of the finalist and held in 4th position. After that her professional journey has started. She started to appear on television, open air concerts, tvc, mixed albums. Her solo album Chhayabazi was released on 2014. In 2017 she released her single track "Gentleman". In 2021 she released her new music video Rongila Hawa. Actor Ziaul Roshan acted in this music video along with luipa. In 2021, on the occasion of National Mourning Day, 15 artistes participated in a new musical arrangement of the song "Jodi Raat Pohale Shona Jeto Bangabandhu More Nai." Originally written by lyricist Hasan Motiur Rahman and composed by Moloy Kumar Ganguly, the song was rearranged by Kaushik Hossain Taposh. The performance featured performances by Oyshee, Luipa, Dola, Anika, Dora, Earnnick, Resmi Mirza, Tashfee, Shithi Saha, Pooja, Haimanti, Putul, Zhilik, and Kornia. In 2022 her new song Naach Moyuri Nacch has been released. This song is written and composed by Kaushik Hossain Taposh. Actress Nusrat Jahan acted in this music video.

== Discography ==
- Chayabaji (2015)

== Awards and nomination ==
- RTV star award 2014 as a best promising singer.
- Meril-Prothom Alo award nomination for album "Chayabaji"
- Symphony Channel-i music award 2015 as new female vocalist.
- Shako telefilm award 2018 as best singer.
