= Resmi Mirza =

Bangladeshi Folk and Fusion singer

Resmi Mirza রেশমি মির্জা
- Genres: folk, fusion, film score
- Occupation: Singer
- Instrument: Vocal
- Years active: 2012–present
- Label: G-Series

Resmi Mirza is a Bangladeshi Folk and Fusion singer. She began her music career in 2012 after participating in the reality show "Power Voice" 2012 on Channel 9, which brought her recognition in the Bangladeshi music scene. Since then, she has released several albums and singles such as her first solo album "Resmi O Mati," featuring a collection of 9 songs. In addition, she has released "Premer Laddu", "Ninduker Mukhe Chai", "Kheltesi", "Itorpona", "Moyna", and "Ami Jare Bashi Bhalo", "Chuiyachi chuiyaci", "Shopno Vengey Churmar" etc. She is also an enlisted artist of Bangladesh Television (BTV).

== Career ==
Resmi’s music career started at a very young age. Her father, Mirza Golam Rasul, a music teacher at Khulna ShilpaKola Academy, was her first mentor. Her musical training began at home, where she was exposed to Bengali folk music and Hindustani classical music. Her first major public performance was at the "Jatiyo Shikkha Shoptaho" competition in 2001, where she performed patriotic and folk songs. She later participated in Channel 9’s "Power Voice" reality show in 2012, which helped her gain wider recognition. She later drew attention with her song "Ninduker Mukhe Poruk Chai" in 2014. In 2015, she made her playback singing debut in the film Action Jasmine, directed by Iftekhar Chowdhury. In 2019, she performed at the opening ceremony of the Bangladesh Premier League (BPL), inaugurated by Sheikh Hasina.

In celebration of 50 years of Bangladesh's independence and the birth centenary of Bangabandhu Sheikh Mujibur Rahman, 50 artistes including Resmi Mirza, contributed to a new rendition of the national anthem, Amar Sonar Bangla.

In 2021, on the occasion of National Mourning Day, 15 artistes participated in a new musical arrangement of the song "Jodi Raat Pohale Shona Jeto Bangabandhu More Nai." Originally written by lyricist Hasan Motiur Rahman and composed by Moloy Kumar Ganguly, the song was rearranged by Kaushik Hossain Taposh. The performance featured performances by Oyshee, Luipa, Dola, Anika, Dora, Earnnick, Reshmi Mirza, Tashfee, Shithi Saha, Pooja, Haimanti, Putul, Zhilik, and Kornia. In 2022, she sang the item song "Premer Laddu", written and composed by Kaushik Hossain Taposh, with its music video featuring actress Tama Mirza. The following year, she sang "Habudubu", an item song from the film Phuljan, composed by S.K. Sameer and written by the film’s director, Aminul Islam Bachchu.

In 2023, she released "Resmi O Mati", an album originally written in 2012. Alongside studio recordings, she has performed in various stage shows and music concerts both in Bangladesh and abroad.

== Discography ==
Year of release	Song name	Lyrics	Composition	Co-artist	Label	References
2018	"Shopno Venge Churmar"	Zulfikar Zahedi	Meer Masum	Meer Masum		
2018	"komolay Nritto Kore"		re composition by Taposh	Jasmine	TM Records	
2019	"Ninduker Mukhe Chai"	Iftekhar Shujon	Meer Masum		G-Series	
2019	"Chuiyachi chuiyaci"					
2021	"Jodi Raat Pohale Shona Jeto Bangabandhu More Nai"	Hasan Motiur Rahman	Moloy Kumar Ganguly	Oyshee, Luipa, Dola, Anika, Dora, Earnnick, Tashfee, Shithi Saha, Pooja, Haimanti, Putul, Zhilik, and Kornia	TM Records	
2022	"Premer Laddu"	Taposh	Taposh		TM Records	

=== Film soundtracks ===
Year	Film Name	Song name	Lyrics	Co-artist	References
2023	Fuljan	"Habu Dubu Khao"	Aminul Islam Bachchu		

=== Solo albums ===
Year	Name	Label	Reference
2015	Resmi O Mati	Amber Records	

== Awards ==
- Dhallywood Film and Music Awards 2023
- NRB Taroka Awards 2024
- ICONIC Star Fashion & Business Awards 2024
