= Doorbin =

Doorbin দূরবীন
- Origin: Dhaka, Bangladesh
- Genres: Rock, folk, pop
- Years active: 2004–present
- Labels: Doorbin Entertainment
- Members: Syed Shahid; Ayub Shahrier; Fahad; Rafi; Shishir; Hridoy; Shawn
- Past members: Arfin Rumey; Kazi Shuvo

Doorbin is a Bangladeshi rock band formed in 2004.

== History ==
In 2004 Syed Shahid formed the band Doorbin with Sabbir and Noyon. In 2006 they released their first album "Doorbin" with help of a number of well wisher.

== Members ==
Current members:

- Syed Shahid (Band Leader & Main Vocal)
- Ayub Shahrier (Vocal & Rhythm)
- Fahad (Lead Guiter)
- Rafi (Keyboard & Composer)
- Shishir (Drums)
- Hridoy (Lead Guiter)
- Shawn (Base Guiter)

Past members:

- Arfin Rumey (Vocal & Composer)
- Kazi Shuvo (Vocal & Guiter)

== Album and singles ==
=== Solo albums ===
- Doorbin (2006)
- Doorbin 2.01 (2008)
- Doorbin 3.01 (2010)
- Doorbin 4.01 (2015)
- Doorbin 5.01 (2017)

=== Mixed albums ===
- Amader-71 (2015)
- Amader-71 2.0 (2016)

== Awards ==
- 5th Citycel-Channel I Awards (Best Band) - Won
