= Bharat Bangladesh Film Awards =

South Asian film awards program

- Location: India and Bangladesh
- Founded: 2019
- Most recent: 2019
- Website: bbdfa.in

Bharat Bangladesh Film Awards is a platform to recognize cinematic excellence from India and Bangladesh.

== 1st Bharat Bangladesh Film Awards ==
The Bharat Bangladesh Film Awards were held on 21 October 2019 at Bashundhara, Dhaka, Bangladesh. Jointly organized by the Film Federation of India (FFI), Bashundhara Group, and the production company TM Films. Hosted by actor Shahriar Nazim Joy and comedian Mir Afsar Ali.

Category	Country	Name / Film	Reference
Lifetime Achievement	India	Ranjit Mallick	
Lifetime Achievement	Bangladesh	Anwara Begum	
Best Film	India	Nagarkirtan	
Best Film	Bangladesh	Debi	
Best Director	India	Srijit Mukherji	
Best Director	Bangladesh	Nasiruddin Yousuff	
Popular Film of the Year	India	Byomkesh Gotro	
Popular Film of the Year	Bangladesh	Password	
Popular Actor of the Year	India	Jeet	
Popular Actor of the Year	Bangladesh	Shakib Khan	
Popular Actress of the Year	India	Rituparna Sengupta	
Popular Actress of the Year	Bangladesh	Jaya Ahsan	
Best Actor	India	Prosenjit Chatterjee	
Best Actor	Bangladesh	Siam Ahmed	
Best Actress	India	Paoli Dam	
Best Actress	Bangladesh	Jaya Ahsan	
Best Supporting Actor	India	Arjun Chakrabarty	
Best Supporting Actor	Bangladesh	Emon	
Best Supporting Actress	India	Sudipta Chakraborty	
Best Supporting Actress	Bangladesh	Zakia Bari Mamo	
Best Music Director	India	Bickram Ghosh	
Best Music Director	Bangladesh	Hridoy Khan	
Best Male Playback Singer	India	Anirban Bhattacharya	
Best Male Playback Singer	Bangladesh	Imran Mahmudul	
Best Female Playback Singer	India	Nikita Nandi	
Best Female Playback Singer	Bangladesh	Somnur Monir Konal & Oyshee	
Best Screenwriter	India	Parambrata Chatterjee	
Best Screenwriter	Bangladesh	Ferahari Farhad	
Best Cinematographer	India	Srijit Mukherji	
Best Cinematographer	Bangladesh	Kamrul Hasan Khosru	
Best Film Editor	India	Sanglap Bhowmik	
Best Film Editor	Bangladesh	Touhid Hossain Chowdhury	
Special Jury Award	India	Yash Dasgupta & Damini Beni Basu	
Special Jury Award	Bangladesh	Taskeen Rahman & Bidya Sinha Saha Mim	
