= Syed Shahid =

Syed Shahidul Islam
- সৈয়দ শহীদুল ইসলাম
- Born: 23 January; Chittagong
- Education: MBA
- Occupations: Musician; composer
- Years active: 2004-Present
- Awards: 5th CitycelChannel-i Award (Best Brand Category for Doorbin), 9th CitycelChannel-i Award (Popular Singer Category)
- Musical career
- Origin: Dhaka, Bangladesh
- Genres: Pop, folk
- Instrument: Vocal
- Member of: Doorbin

Syed Shahidul Islam (Bengali: সৈয়দ শহীদুল ইসলাম) is a Bangladeshi musician and composer. Generally known as Shahid and for his band Doorbin. He worked in 26 mixed album and released his three solo album.

== Early life ==
Syed Shahidul Islam was born and raised in Chittagong, where he learned music, studying the harmonium under Soumyo Didi. None of his family members liked music, so he had to practiced his singing secretly. Shahid first got recognised as a singer as a student of Al Khan High School, when he won the first prize in an inter district 'Nazrul' song competition. Afterwards he studied music at Shilpokola Academy while he was a student at Government City College, Chittagong. He formed a band named 'Lohitto' when he was a graduate student in economics. Later, he moved to Dhaka. In 2004 he formed the band Doorbin with Sabbir and Noyon.

== Career ==
Shahid is the chief vocalist of the band Doorbin. In 2008, Shahid released his first solo album Brishtir Gaan. In 2011, he released his second solo album Nilambori from which Ek Jibon was nominated for Meril Prothom Alo Awards. He released a sequel Ek Jibon 2 in 2012. The music video of the album Nilambori was scripted by Zahid Akbar and directed by Arfin Rumi. He joined the collaborative album Bappi Featuring-3 in 2012. Nil Chowa, his third solo album, was released in 2013. He collaborated with Porshi for the soundtrack of the movie Na Bola Bhalobasa.

=== Solo album ===
- Bristir Gaan (2008)
- Nilambori (2011)
- Nil Chowa (2013)
