= Shuvo =

Shuvo or Shubho or Subho (শুভ) is a Bengali name meaning "prosperous" or "auspicious" that may refer to:

== Given name ==
- Shuvo Roy, Bangladeshi-American Scientist and Engineer

== Surname ==
- Ali Akram Shuvo, Bangladeshi music director
- Arifin Shuvoo, Bangladeshi film actor and television personality
- Kazi Shuvo, Bangladeshi singer
- Khan Ahmed Shuvo, Bangladeshi politician
- Suhrawadi Shuvo, Bangladeshi cricketer
