= Mohini Dey =

Indian bass player (born 1996)

- Born: 20 July 1996 (age 30)
- Origin: Kolkata, West Bengal, India
- Genres: Ragazz; funk; fusion; experimental
- Occupation: Musician
- Instrument: Bass guitar
- Years active: 2010–present
- Member of: MaMoGi; Willow
- Spouse: Mark Hartsuch (div. 2024)
- Website: mohinideybass.in

Mohini Dey (born 20 July 1996) is an Indian bass player from Kolkata. She is part of Gaan Bangla's Wind of Change and Coke Studio India and also plays for A. R. Rahman.

== Early life ==
Dey was born and brought up in Mumbai. When she was born, her parents were struggling to make ends meet, as her father worked as a session musician. He noticed his daughter's musical talent before she turned three and began to nurture it. Dey received her first bass guitar when she was nine or ten. She started giving performances at the age of 11. Her talent was noticed by her father's friend Ranjit Barot, who took her on his band's tours. She was also mentored by jazz exponent Louis Banks.

== Music career ==
Dey released her self-titled debut album in August 2023. She and her ex-husband, Mark Hartsuch, both play in the band MaMoGi, along with drummer Gino Banks. She has collaborated with Steve Vai, Marco Minnemann, Jordan Rudess of Dream Theater, Jason Richardson, Dewa Budjana, Zakir Hussain, Sivamani, A. R. Rahman, Greg Howe, and Willow Smith.

In 2024, she was invited to join Smith's new band.

In late 2025, Dey drew criticism for her marketing partnership with the generative AI music service Suno.

== Personal life ==
Dey speaks Marathi, Hindi, Bengali, and English. She was married to saxophonist Mark Hartsuch. In November 2024, the couple announced that they had divorced.

== Discography ==
- Mohini Dey (2023)
- The Dey Way (2026)
