= Imran Mahmudul =

Bangladeshi singer-songwriter

Imran Mahmudul ইমরান মাহমুদুল
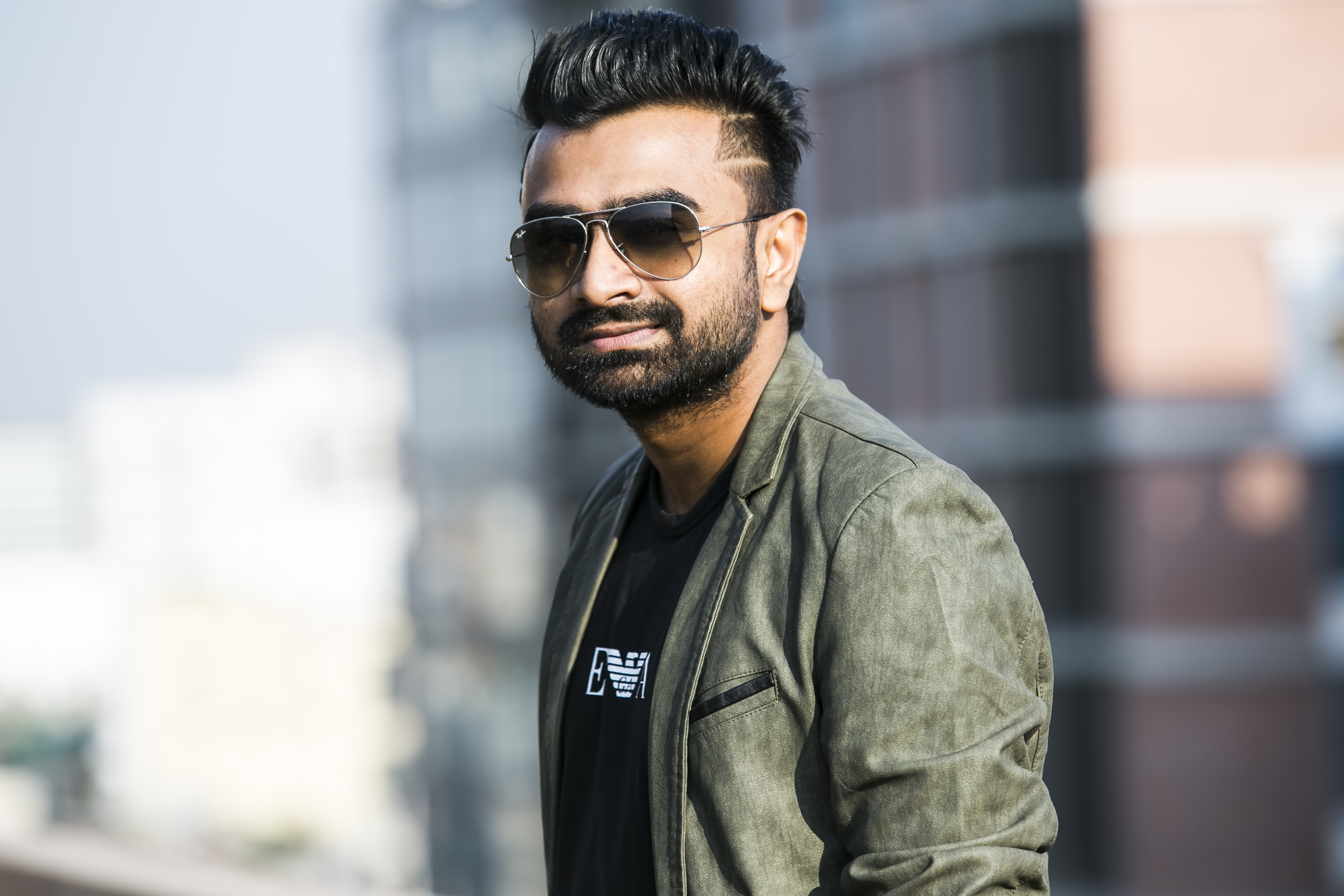
- Mahmudul in 2017

Background information
- Born: Md. Mahmudul Haque Imran; 5 September 1990 (age 36); Konapara, Jatrabari, Dhaka, Bangladesh
- Genres: World; pop; R&B; soul
- Occupations: Playback singer; composer
- Years active: 2011–present
- Labels: CD Choice; Sangeeta; Dhruba Music; Yonder Music; CMV Music
- Spouse: Meher Ayat Zarin (m. 2023)

Md. Mahmudul Haque Imran (born 5 September 1991), best known as Imran Mahmudul, is a Bangladeshi music composer and playback singer whose songs have been featured in different albums and movies. He was the first runner-up of Channel i Sera Kontho - 2008. He also won Best Male Singer at the Meril Prothom Alo Awards for the song "Dil Dil Dil" from the 2016 film Bossgiri.

== Career ==
Imran Mahmudul learned composition and sound engineering from Arfin Rumey and started his career singing in the movie Bhalobashar Lal Golap with Sabina Yasmin in 2008. He worked in the mixed album named Rongdhanu with another participant from Channel I Sera Kontho, Sharmin. His first studio album was Shopnoloke composed by Arfin Rumey. Sabina Yasmin, Nijhu and Sabrina Porshi sang along with him in this album. "Fire Eshona" is a 2014 song that became the second most viewed Bangladeshi song on YouTube of 2014. Ahmed Bin Sojib and Kamalika Karmakar starrer Venge Chure Jai song released on 23 November 2024.

== Discography ==
=== Studio albums ===
Year	Album	Composer	Lyricist	Label	Ref(s)
2011	Shopnoloke	Arfin Rumey, Mahmud Sunny and Imran	Anurup Aich, Jahid Akbar, Robiul Islam Jibon, Jesica Afrin, Alif Hasan and Faysal	GM Bulbul	
2014	Tumi	Imran Mahmudul	Robiul Islam Jibon, Sheikh Sumon Emdadh & Reefat	CD Choice	
2014	Tumi Hina	Imran Mahmudul		CD Choice	
2014	Milon (with Milon)	Imran Mahmudul		CD Choice	
2015	Bolte Bolte Cholte Cholte	Imran Mahmudul	Robiul Islam Jibon, GM Bulbul & Shafiq Tuhin	Sangeeta	
2015	Prem Kabbo (with Belal Khan & Shafiq)	Imran Mahmudul, Belal Khan & Shafiq		Eagle Music	
2016	Mon Karigor (with Tahsan)	Imran Mahmudul & Tahsan	Robiul Islam Jibon & GM Bulbul	CD Choice	
2016	Aaj Bhalobashona (with Bristy & Kona)	Imran Mahmudul		Sangeeta	
2016	Adhek Tumi (with Bappa Mazumder)	Nazir Mahmud & Suman Kalyan		CMV Music	

=== Extended plays ===
Year	EP	Composer	Lyricist	Label	Ref(s)
2016	Bahudore	Imran Mahmudul	Faisal Rabbikin	Eagle Music	
2016	Nancy with Stars (with Nancy)	Imran Mahmudul		CD Choice	
2017	Roop	Imran Mahmudul		Tiger Media	

=== Singles ===
Year	Song	Label	Notes	Ref(s)
2012	"Dure Dure" (with Puja)			
2015	"Maa"			
2015	"Tumi Chokh Mele Takale" (with Oyshee)			
2016	"Ekattorer Maa Jononi"			
2016	"Boishakhi Rong" (with Milon)	CD Choice	From the album Tumi Hina and Boishakhi Bajna	
2016	"Boishakhi Dhol" (with Kona)	CD Choice	From the album Boishakhi Bajna	
2016	"Bhinno"	Gaanchill Music		
2016	"Priya Re"	Eagle Music		
2016	"Life In A Metro"	Cloud 7		
2016	"Onek Shadhonar Pore" (with Nancy)	Jaaz Multimedia	From the soundtrack of Niyoti	
2016	"Shobai Chole Jabe" (with Palak Muchhal)	Soundtek	From the album Aamar Ichchhe Kothai	
2016	"Bole Dao" (with Porshi)	CD Choice	From the soundtrack of Sultana Bibiana	
2016	"Priya Re"	Eagle Music		
2016	"Bolona Ekbar" (with Nancy)	Soundtek		
2016	"Tui Chole Jabi"	Gaanchill Music		
2016	"Alo Chaya" (with Tahsin)	CD Choice		
2017	"Lakho Shopon" (with Nadia)	Eagle Music		
2017	"Dhoa" (Fuad featuring Imran)	Dhruba Music Station		
2017	"Hridoydani"	CD Choice		
2017	"Mon Kharaper Deshe"	CMV Music	From the album Adhek Tumi	
2017	"The Cricket Bangladesh" (with Oyshee)	CD Choice		
2017	"Beyara DJ AKS (Remix)" (Joy Shariar featuring Imran)	Aajob Records		
2017	"Thik Bethik" (with Nancy)	CD Choice		
2017	"Ghorir Kata" (Joy Shariar featuring Imran)	Contel		
2017	"Borosha"	G-Series		
2017	"Priyo Oviman"	CD Choice		
2017	"Aamar Ichchhe Kothai"	CD Choice	From the album Aamar Ichchhe Kothai	
2018	"Sesh Shuchona"	CD Choice		
	"Jodi Hatta Dhoro"	Laser Vision		
	"Emon Ekta Tumi Chai"	CMV Music		
2019	"Amar Kache Tumi Onnorokom"	CMV Music		
	"Abdar"(with Porshi)	CD Choice		
	"Keno Eto Chai Toke"(with Labiba)	CMV Music		
	"Tui Ki Amar Hobi Re"(with Kona)	Massranga Television & Jaaz Multimedia		

== Accolades ==
Year	Award	Category	Result	Notes	Ref.
2014	Meril Prothom Alo Awards	Best Singer (Male)	Nominated	"Hridoyer Patay" from album Tumi Hina	
2015	Meril Prothom Alo Awards	Best Singer (Male)	Nominated	"Bahudora" From album "Bahudora"	
2016	Meril Prothom Alo Awards	Best Singer (Male)	Won	"Dil Dil Dil" from soundtrack Bossgiri	
2017	Meril Prothom Alo Awards	Best Singer (Male)	Nominated	"Dhoa"	
2018	Meril Prothom Alo Awards	Best Singer (Male)	Won	"O Hey Shyam" from soundtrack PoraMon 2	
2019	BBFA	Best Singer (Male)	Won	"SWAG" from soundtrack Password	
2020	45th Bangladesh National Film Awards	Best Male Playback Singer & Best Music Composer	Won	"Tui Ki Amar Hobi Re" from soundtrack Bishwoshundori	
2021	CJFB Performance Award	Best Singer (Male)	Won	"Tui Ki Amar Hobi Re" from soundtrack Bishwoshundori	
2026	BIFA Awards	Best Singer	Won	"Pori" from Prince: Once Upon a Time in Dhaka	
2026	Meril-Prothom Alo Awards	Best Singer (Male)	Nominated	"Pori" from Prince: Once Upon a Time in Dhaka	
