= Pantha Kanai =

Bangladeshi musician and music teacher

- পান্থ কানাই
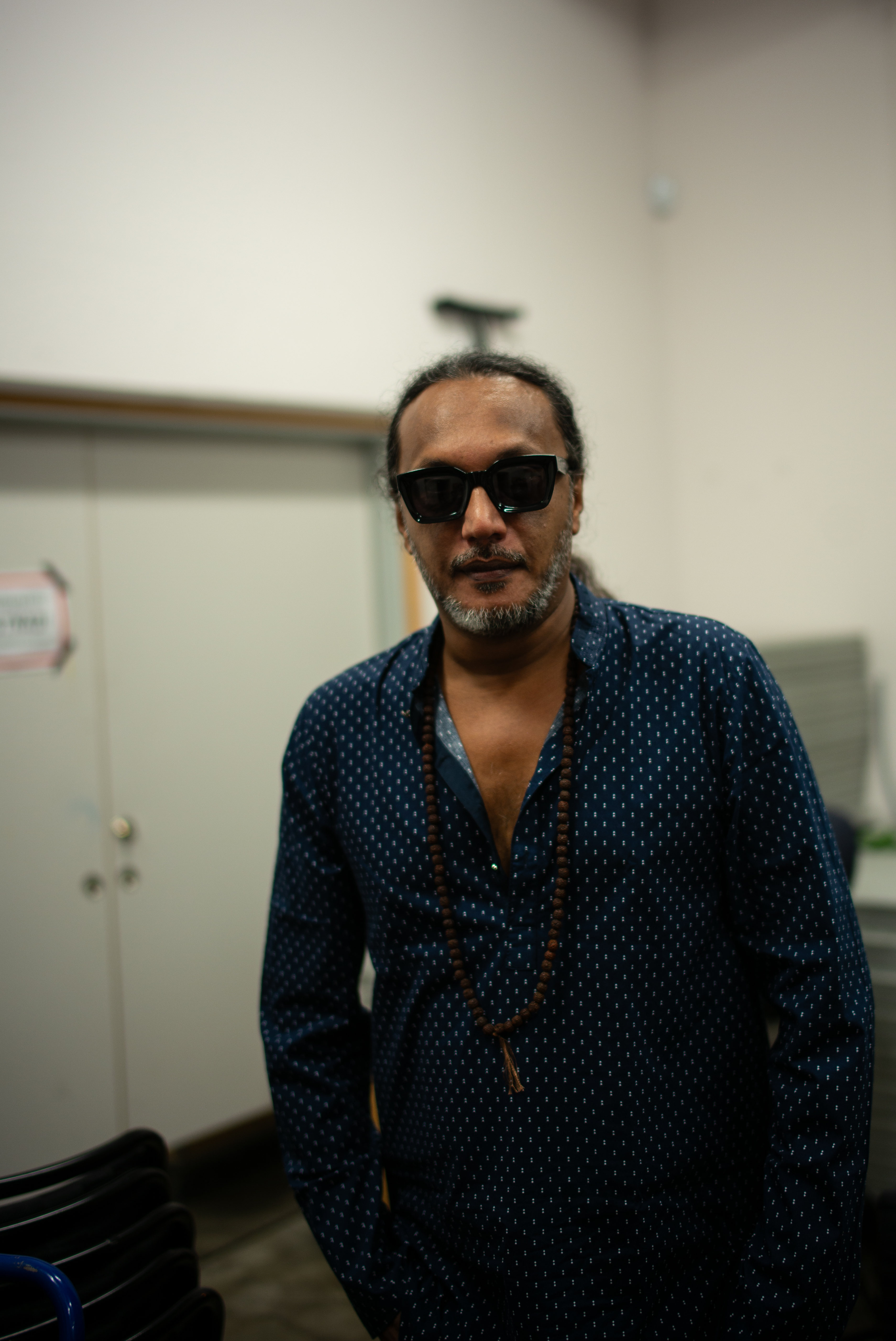
- Born: Pantha Kanai Jewel; 2 February; Chittagong, Bangladesh
- Occupations: musician, drummer, tabla player, music teacher
- Years active: 2001–present
- Children: 3

Pantha Kanai (born 2 February) is a Bangladeshi singer, drummer, tabla player and music teacher.

== Early life ==
Kanai was born and brought up in the port city of Chittagong. His mother is a musician. He learned to play the classical tabla at an early age. From the age of six he played classical tabla with his mother. He started playing jazz drums while in high school, later becoming one of the most popular singers and drummers in the country, playing drums in bands like Souls and Nagar Baul. In class 10, when he started playing drums, formed a band called Ocean. Soon after that he started singing himself.

== Career ==
Kanai released his debut album "Ma" in 2001 with the band Tandav, the same year he released another album titled "Adam Hawa". In 2002 he released "Mon Karighor" and in 2003 he released his last solo album "Nouka Zamin Natai". The famous "Ore Neel Doriya" from the movie Sareng Bau (1978) was released in the album Chumki-1 released in 2003. He sang on the remixed version of the song. For the same album, Kanai also sang a remix of the famous song "Chumki Chala Eka Pathe" from the film Dost Dushman (1978), which was re-released on Anumop Recordings' YouTube channel on 19 October 2020. The National Award-winning song "Haire Manush Rongin Phanush" from the film "Boro Bhalo Lok Chhilo" (1982) was produced by Soundtech and titled "Rongin Manush" with music direction by DJ Mortaza in 2005. The remix version is used in the album, with vocals by Pantho Kanai. Dilshad Nahar Kona, Elita Karim, John Alamgir, Sabbir sang the theme song of the T20 Cricket World Cup held in Bangladesh in 2014 "Char Chokkha Hoi Hoi". Huda, Badhon Sarkar Puja and Kaushik Hossain Taposh gave their voice together. The song is composed and composed by Fuad Al Muqtadir and lyrics are composed by Anam Biswas and Rifayet Ahmed, also the music video is directed by Ashikur Rahman. It was officially released worldwide on 20 February 2014. Most of its songs are expressed in Bengali language; English language has also been included in it. Through the song, a new genre like Flash Mob was born in the main cities of Bangladesh. In 2016, he released a three-song solo album "Dehkhachcha" online in 2016, almost 13 years after the release of his last solo album. In the 2017 film Swatta, he voiced a duet with Badhan Sarkar Puja in an item song titled "Raja Bodol" composed by Bappa Mazumder and written by Ahsan Kabir. He then released two music videos on YouTube in September 2018 titled "Deher Majhe" composed and composed by Sumon Koliyan and "Mon Shopilam" composed and composed by Rusho Mahtab. In 2018, he launched a music school called Drumbaaz. In February 2019, he lent his voice to a song titled "Poribibir Majhare Dekho" for Fahmida Nabi's album titled Jiboner Joyganer with 15 patriotic songs composed by Borno Chakraborty. In 2020, a song titled "Ami Nabab" from the film Nabab LLB, starring Shakib Khan and Orchita Sporshia was first recorded in his voice. However, the version sung by Indian musician Sampreet Dutt was kept in the film. Director Anonno Mamun faced criticism from fans and audiences for not including his version in the film.
