= CD Choice =

Record label from Bangladesh

- Founded: 2006
- Founder: Md. Zahirul Islam Shohel
- Status: Active
- Distributor: CD Choice
- Genre: Various (Music, Drama, Film, Bengali, Bangladeshi Devotional)
- Country of origin: Bangladesh
- Location: Dhaka, Bangladesh
- Official website: cdchoice.com.bd

CD Choice is a Bangladeshi record label and media production company based in Dhaka. Founded in 2006 by Zahirul Islam Shohel, the company produces and distributes music, television dramas, telefilms and films — initially on cassettes, CDs, VCDs and DVDs, and later through digital platforms. Described in 2016 as one of the most-discussed production houses in Bangladesh's music scene, it expanded onto YouTube, where its main channel is among the most-subscribed Bangladeshi channels, with around 8.9 million subscribers as of October 2026.

== History ==
CD Choice was established in 2006 by Md. Zahirul Islam Shohel. In its early years the company produced cassettes, CDs, VCDs and DVDs of music, dramas, television films and movies. It became known for large seasonal release slates, including a record number of albums for Valentine's Day and several albums and music videos for Pohela Boishakh, among them folk singer Momtaz's solo album Joler Ayna.

The label has released albums and singles by artists including Habib Wahid, Imran Mahmudul, Arfin Rumey, Kumar Bishwajit, Tahsan, Nancy, Sabrina Porshi, Minar and Fahmida Nabi. Notable releases include the collaborative album Nancy with Stars and the audio of the film Sultana Bibiana. CD Choice Music released folk singer Fakir Alamgir's album Old is Gold; singer Rakib Mosabbir's solo album Mon ta Chhuye Dekho Na; Dhruba Guha's debut album Shudhu Tomar Jonno; Ujjwal Aditya's debut solo album Prem Pagla; and Tamim Islam's debut solo album Tamim. Emdad Sumon has been described as the head (kornodhar) of CD Choice Music.

== Digital presence ==
CD Choice launched its YouTube channel on 18 January 2014. On 2 April 2018 the channel crossed 7.5 million subscribers, and it was verified by YouTube the same year. It was reported as the first Bangladeshi institution to receive YouTube's Silver Play Button, followed by the Gold Play Button. As of October 2026 the channel had around 8.9 million subscribers and more than 2,700 videos. The company's second channel, "CD CHOICE Drama", launched in October 2016, had around 7.6 million subscribers. The most-viewed song on the main channel is "Mon Pinjira", composed by Rakib Mosabbir.

== Artists ==
Artists who have released music through CD Choice include:

- Rakib Mosabbir
- Habib Wahid
- Imran Mahmudul
- Kazi Shuvo
- Sabrina Porshi
- Mila Islam
- Kumar Bishwajit
- Tahsan
- Sania Sultana Liza
- Minar
- Fahmida Nabi
- Tanvir Evan
- Arfin Rumey
- Farabi Islam

== Notable albums ==
- Chithi – Arfin Rumey and Nancy
- Manena Mon – Imran Mahmudul and Puja
- Anmona – Imran Mahmudul and Naomi
- Ki Jadu Korecho – Andrew Kishore and Kanak Chapa
- Jaan Amar Jaan – S I Tutul and Nancy
- Ei Bukete – Tausif and Farabi
- Rodela Akash – Kazi Shuvo and Puja
- Par Koro Tumi – Kumar Bishwajit
- Amare Chhareya – Tausif
- Na Bola Kotha – Elias and Orin
- Bhalobashar Porosh – Arfin Rumey and Kheya
- Mon Chhuye Dekho – Arfin Rumey and Anonna
- Jibon To Sukher Holo – Shahid and Shubhmita
- Jaan Pakhi – Tausif and Kheya
- Mon ta Chhuye Dekho Na – Rakib Mosabbir (2017)
