= Kuddus Boyati =

Bangladeshi folk singer

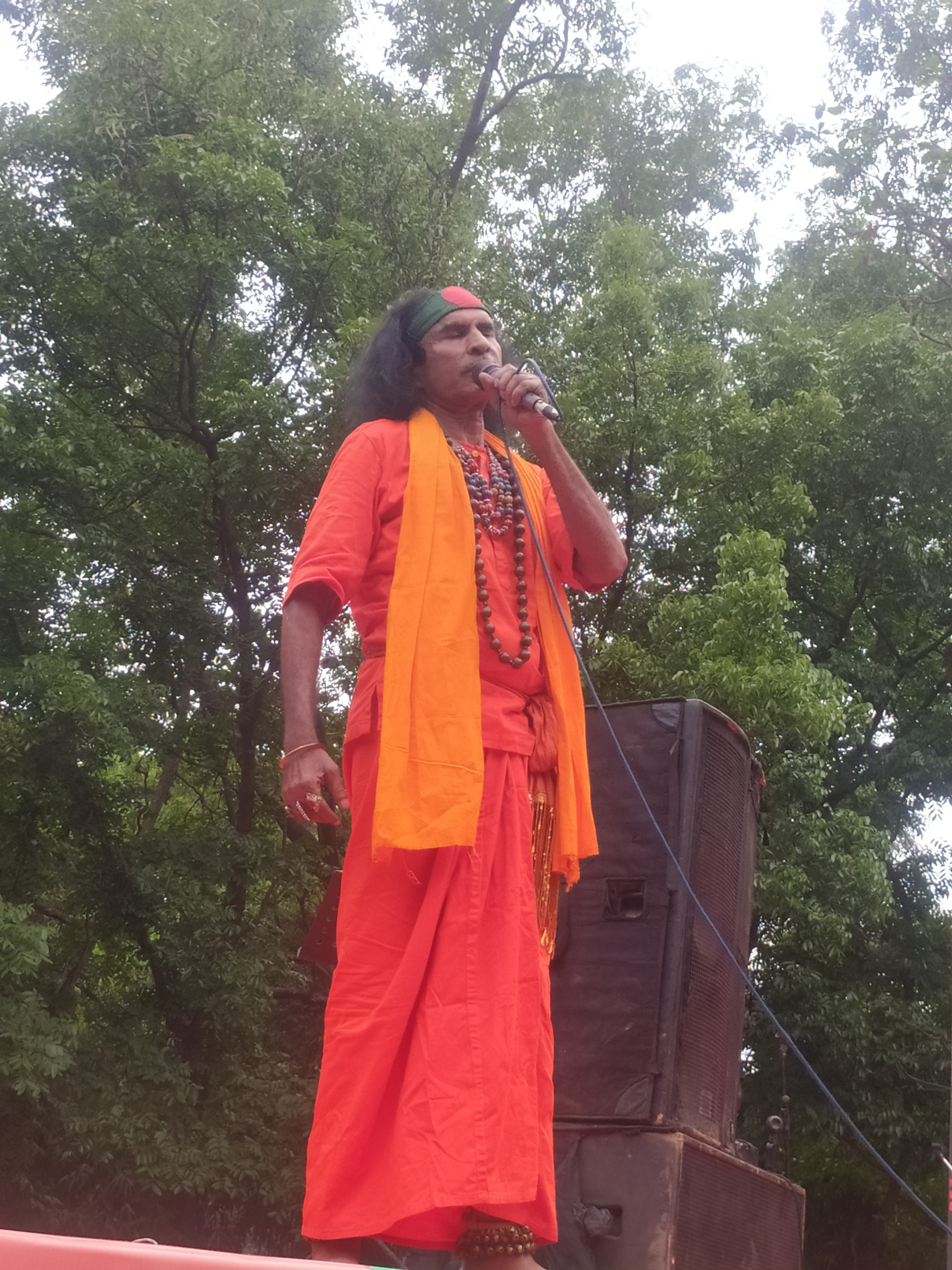
- Born: Abdul Kuddus; 1949 (age 76–77); Kendua, Netrokona District
- Known for: folk singer

Abdul Kuddus Boyati (born 1949) is a Bangladeshi folk singer. He is often mentioned as Folk Superstar by Bangladeshi media.

== Early life ==
Kuddus was born in 1949 at Rajibpur village, Kendua Upazila of Netrokona District during the time of the British Raj. Due to financial problem, he didn't have the opportunity to study and started music practice at the age of 11. Later, he came to Dhaka in search of work where he met Director Afzal Hossain and started his career by performing in the folk related music documentaries.

== Music ==
Kuddus collaborated with other musicians including Kangalini Sufia, Abdur Rahman Boyati and Anusheh Anadil.

== Awards ==
- Bijoy Dibosh Podok (1995)
- Rifles Week award (2005)
- Foundation of Saarc Writers and Literature award (2011)
