= Jodi Raat Pohale Shona Jeto =

Song by Moloy Kumar Ganguly

from the album Jonotar Nouka
- Language: Bengali
- English title: If you could hear it when the night was over
- Written: 1990
- Published: 1990
- Released: 1991
- Recorded: 1991
- Studio: Jhankar Studio
- Venue: Dhaka
- Genre: Modern music
- Length: 4:27
- Label: Chenasur
- Composer: Moloy Kumar Ganguly
- Lyricist: Hasan Motiur Rahman
- Producer: Hasan Motiur Rahman
External audio
- "Jodi Raat Pohale Shona Jeto by Moloy Kumar Ganguly" on YouTube
- "Jodi Raat Pohale Shona Jeto by Sabina Yasmin" on YouTube

"Jodi Raat Pohale Shona Jeto" is a song from the 1991 Bangladeshi music album named Jonotar Nouka (lit. 'Boat of People'). The lyricist of this modern music was Hasan Motiur Rahman. Moloy Kumar Ganguly composed sang originally this song to the tune with music arrangement of Almas Ali. The song is considered to be the most popular song about Sheikh Mujibur Rahman. The song was released under label of Chenasur along with other songs from the audio album.

== Background ==
Sheikh Mujibur Rahman was the favorite personality of singer Moloy Kumar Ganguly. After assassination of Sheikh Mujibur Rahman, he suffered psychologically. Malay wanted to make a song about him from that pain. Singer Moloy Kumar Ganguly was given the task of singing at the party conference of Awami League to be held in France in 1990. He then asked Hasan Motiur Rahman to write two songs, one each about Sheikh Mujibur Rahman and Sheikh Hasina. Writing a song about Mujib was difficult in terms of responsibility as he did not agree at first but was forced to do it later. When he remembered his assassination in dawn, he got some ideas for the lyrics and wrote down. Then in the morning he went to Malay Kumar Ganguly and showed him the lyrics. He immediately composed the song. It was then sung by Moloy at that conference. The audience at the conference liked and appreciated the song. A year after Sheikh Hasina became Prime Minister of Bangladesh in the June 1996 Bangladeshi general election, she planned to have Sabina Yasmin sing the song. At that time, the song Sabina sang was directed by Farid Ahmed as per the plan.

== Record and release ==
Fearing the threat of the then military junta, no studio in Dhaka wanted to record the song, Moloy recorded the song in France for the first time. The military government fired Malay Kumar Ganguly from his job and evicted him from his government residence for recording the song. Preparations for a general election began after Hussain Muhammad Ershad resigned as a result of the 1990 Mass Uprising in Bangladesh. Then Hasan Matiur Rahman recorded the song in Jhankar studio for the second time under Chenasur label. The song was released in the album titled Jonotar Nouka. The song became popular after the album released for the Awami League election campaign reached the public. The album became so popular in 1991 that people got into fights trying to buy its cassette.

== Remake ==
The remastered new version of the song was released on 15 August 2021 on Gaan Bangla and YouTube, directed by Kaushik Hossain Taposh.

== Achievement ==
Year	Award	Nomination	Category	Result	Ref
2020	Natyajan Shyamal Adhikari Memorial Medal	Hasan Motiur Rahman	Best Music	Won	
