= Gaan Bangla =

Bangladeshi music TV channel

Gaan Bangla গান বাংলা
- Country: Bangladesh
- Broadcast area: Nationwide
- Headquarters: Baridhara, Dhaka

Programming
- Picture format: 1080i HDTV (downscaled to 16:9 576i for SDTV sets)

Ownership
- Owner: One More Zero Group
- Key people: Farzana Arman Munny (chairwoman); Kaushik Hossain Taposh (managing director and CEO)

History
- Launched: 16 December 2013; 12 years ago

Links
- Website: www.gaanbangla.tv

Availability

Streaming media
- Jagobd: jagobd.com/gaanbangla

Gaan Bangla (Bengali: গান বাংলা; lit. 'Song Bangla'), also known by the acronym GB, is a Bangladeshi Bengali-language music television channel owned by One More Zero Group, through Birds Eye Mass Media and Communication. Launched on 16 December 2013, it is Bangladesh's second music-oriented television channel. After Channel 16's closure, Gaan Bangla became the country's sole music channel. The channel is based in Baridhara, Dhaka.

== History ==
In October 2011, the Bangladesh Telecommunication Regulatory Commission granted "Gaan Bangla TV" a license to broadcast. The channel began transmissions as Gaan Bangla on 16 December 2013 as Bangladesh's first music-oriented television channel broadcasting in high definition, with its prime focus on redefining the standards of music video production. As a high-definition television channel, artists and video creators alike were inspired to start creating high-definition content.

In July 2016, Gaan Bangla premiered its first self-produced musical series titled Wind of Change, which was believed to have revolutionized television music shows in Bangladesh. Wind of Change featured popular Bangladeshi artists such as Ayub Bachchu, Miles (band), and more. It presented new renditions of Bengali songs in collaboration with international instrumentalists. At the same time, the country was introduced to 'Behaya Mon' by Chisty Baul.

On 5 August 2024, the channel went off the air temporarily after its offices in Dhaka were attacked and set on fire by protesters during the non-cooperation movement, shortly after prime minister Sheikh Hasina resigned. It was one of several television channels that were vandalized and, as a result, were forced out of the air. Gaan Bangla later resumed broadcasting. On 11 December 2024, Bangladesh Satellite Company Limited shut Gaan Bangla down at 12:00 (BST) for failing to pay its fees exceeding BDT 1.5 crore.

== Programming ==
=== Wind of Change ===
Gaan Bangla is most famous for the Wind of Change series, which debuted in 2016. It showcases local and international musicians performing together, with music composed by Taposh. The series featured famous Bangladeshi artists.

== Controversies ==
On 4 November 2024, Gaan Bangla managing director Kaushik Hossain Taposh was arrested in Uttara and taken into custody in a case alleging attempt of murder. Almost a month later, on 3 December, another case was filed against Taposh and Farzana Munny, his wife and the chairwoman of the channel, alongside three others, by Syed Shams Uddin Ahmed, who registered a company called Birds Eye Mass Media on 25 July 2011 in order to launch the channel, accusing them of illegally taking over the ownership of the channel from Ahmed by threatening him on gunpoint. Taposh was subsequently arrested again on 9 December.
