= Fatima Tuz Zahra Oyshee =

Bangladeshi singer

Oyshee ঐশী
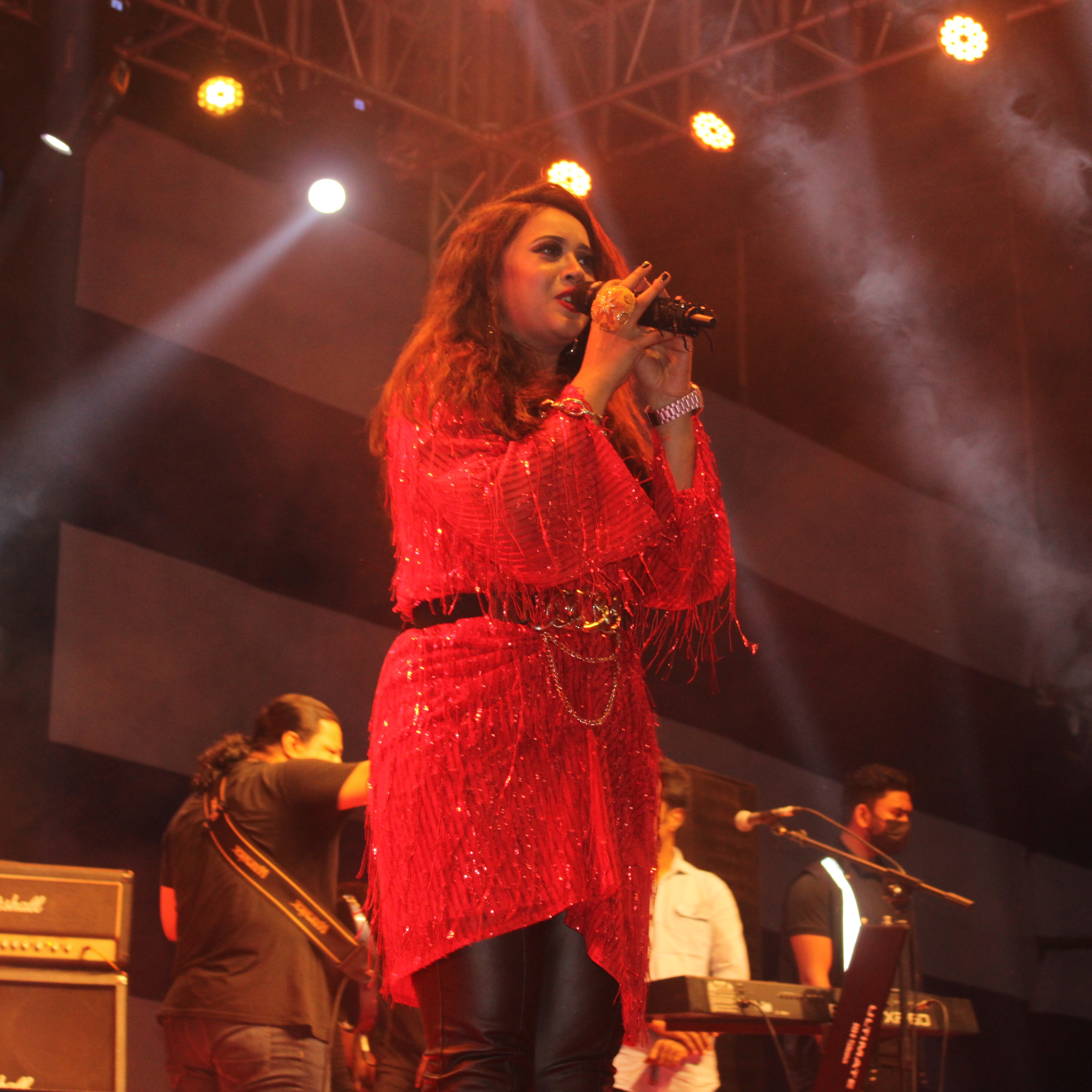
- Oyshee at Rajdharpur Madhyamik Bidyalay's Golden Jubilee (2023)

Background information
- Born: Fatima Tuz Zahra Oyshee; 8 December 1996 (age 29)
- Genres: Modern; pop; classical; folk-rock
- Occupations: Singer and physician
- Instruments: Vocal; harmonium
- Years active: 2012–present
- Labels: Laser Vision Ltd; CMV; G Series; CD Choice; Soundtek; Sangita
- Spouse: Arefin Zilani Sakib (m. 2023)

Fatima Tuz Zahra Oyshee (born 8 December 1996) is a Bangladeshi singer. She is notable for her albums Oyshee Express, Oyshee's Maya, Oyshee's Haowa, Chokher Bari, Oyshee Express2, Oyshee Express3, GB Dilki Doya Hoyna, GB Dillite Nizamuddin Awolia with Imran Mahmudul and Dehobazi with Arfin Rumey. She won Bangladesh National Film Award for Best Female Playback Singer for her performance in the film Maya: The Lost Mother (2019).

== Career ==
Oyshee learned music from 'Rangpur Shishu Academy'. In 2002, she participated in NTV show 'Shapla Kuri'. She became 2nd Runner-up. Later, she published her first album 'Oyshee Express', composed by Imran Mahmudul, which became a breakthrough hit. In 2017, she sang the song "Neelima", composed by Imran Mahmudul and written by Robiul Islam Jibon. In 2016, her second album “Maya” released on the Noboborsho (14 April). The music director was Belal Khan and the songs are “Maya”, “Ochin Taan”, “Naalish”, “Din-e Din-e” and “Ari”. They were written by Anurup Aich, Shomeshwar Oli and Robiul Islam Jibon. she recorded a folk song "Kajol Bhromora" as a featured artist alongside Adit Ozbert, it became popular. "Dil Ki Doya Hoyna" and "Tumi Chokh Mele Takale" are other successful songs by her in that period. In February 2018, she signed a contract with Indian record label Shree Venkatesh Films, becoming the youngest Bangladeshi singer to do so. Besides, she is a physician. She started her profession as a medical officer of CCU at the department of cardiology at MH Samorita Hospital and Medical College in Dhaka.

== Personal life ==
Oyshee married Arefin Jilani Sakib on 2 June 2023 after two and a half years of relationship.

== Discography ==
=== Albums ===
- Oyshee Express
- Maya
- Hawa
- Chokher Bari
- Dehobazi

=== Singles ===
- Janina Janina
- Preme Porechi
- Tumi Chokh Mele
- The Cricket Bangladesh
- Maya
- Dine Dine
- Jibon Chaka
- Tumi Amar Ke
- Shoi
- Nalish
- Tumi Chara
- Break Up
- Achin Taan
- Mon Jane
- Mutho Mutho Valobasha
- Du Dike Kade Hridoy
- Chupi Chupi
- Janina Janina Solo
- Ei Fagun
- Boishakh Elo
- Shokher Ghuddi
- Bristi
- Maya Nai
- Chinta
- Shopno Vebe
- Bristi Balok
- Amay Niye Chol
- Habibi
- Bolna Tui
- Mishey Gacho
- Bhalobasha Dao
- Duna Mona

== Awards and nominations ==
- Best singer;– "Symphony Channel i music award" – 2016
- Best emerging singer;– "Bachsas Awards" – 2016
- Best singer popular choice;– "Bachsas Awards" – 2018
- Best Female Playback Singer;- 44th Bangladesh National Film Award" -2019
