= Dilshad Nahar Kona =

Bangladeshi singer

- দিলশাদ নাহার কনা
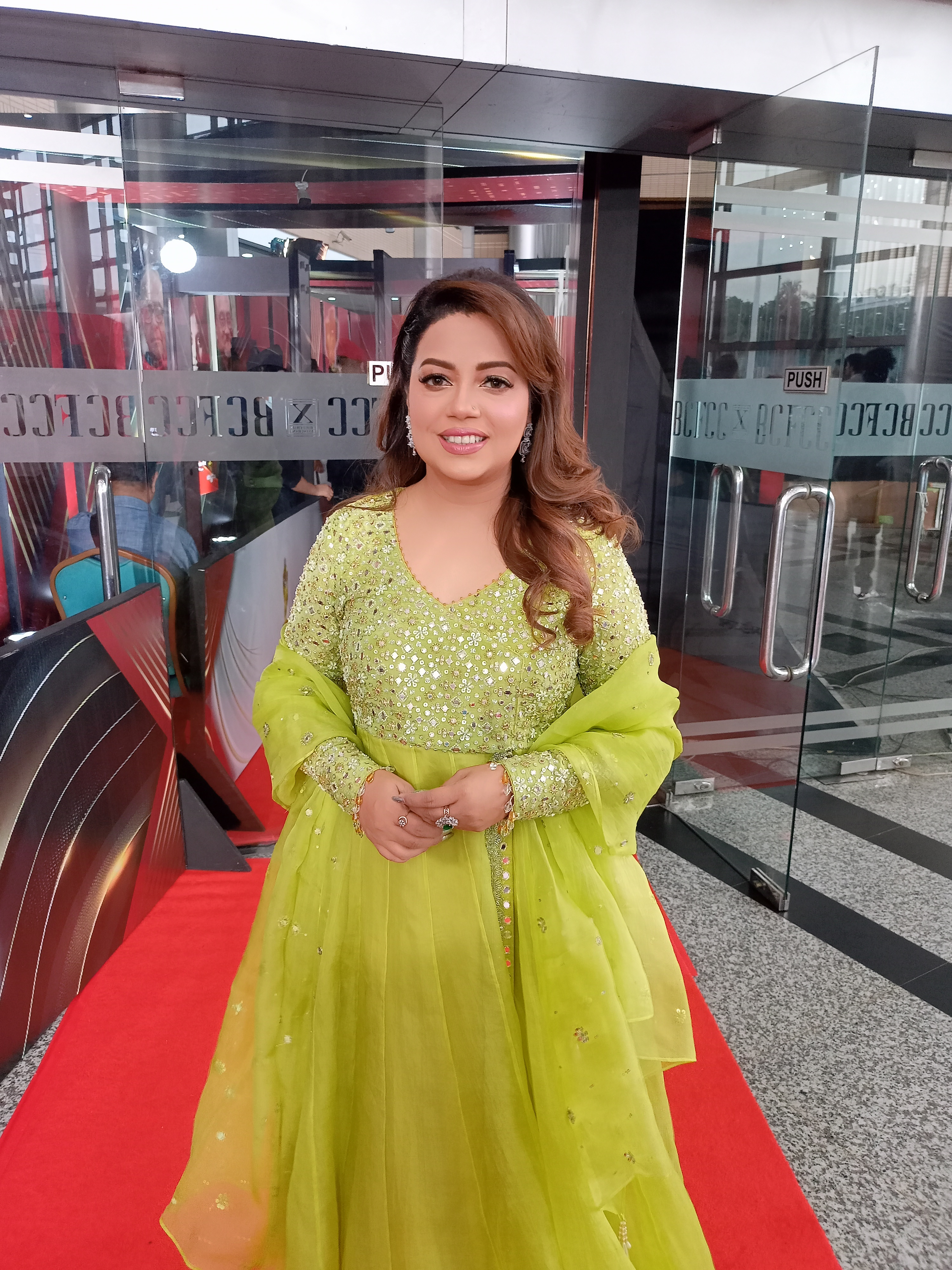
- Kona in 2025
- Born: 15 April 1983 (age 43); Dhaka, Bangladesh
- Occupation: Singer
- Years active: 1999–present
- Awards: full list

Dilshad Nahar Kona (born 15 April 1983) is a Bangladeshi singer. She won Bangladesh National Film Award for Best Female Playback Singer for her song "Tui Ki Amar Hobi Re" in the film Bishwoshundori (2020).

== Early life ==
Kona was a student of Moghbazar Girls High School and Lalmatia College, Dhaka. She studied Nazrul Geeti in Nazrul Academy.

== Career ==
Kona was a member of the female band Angels Four with Nafisa, Rumana and Tisha during 2003–2006. It was formed by S.I. Tutul and Shopon. After the band was disbanded, she started her solo career in 2006 with her first album Jamitik Bhalobasha. Her next album Fuad featuring Kona, with Fuad, was released in 2008. The album Simply Kona released in 2011 was composed by Sri-Lankan music director Iraj Weeraratne and Bangladeshi composers Bappa Mazumder and Fuad.

Kona performs voice-overs on television commercials in Bangladesh. She hosted a show on NTV named Tumader Jonno Bangladesh. She was one of the seven singers of the official song of 2014 ICC World Twenty20.

== Works ==
=== Studio albums ===
Year	Album	Label	Ref(s)
2008	Fuad featuring Kona (with Fuad)	Agniveena	
2011	Simply Kona	Deadline Music	
2014	Fuad Introduces Kona	Qinetic Music	
2016	Rhythmic Kona	CMV	

=== Compilation albums ===
Year	Album	Label	Ref(s)
2009	Priyotomeshu		
2011	Shihoron		
2012	Nari		
2014	Shomonnoy		

=== Singles ===
Year	Song	Album	Label	Ref(s)
2013	Dheem Tana	Simply Kona	IRAJ	
2014	"Char Chokka Hoi Hoi" (Fuad featuring Kona^{1})	Non-Album Single	ICC	
2015	"Jani Tumi" (with Fahim Islam)	Bolchi Tomai	Deadline Music	
2016	"Cheep Nouko" (with Tahsan)	Kheyal Poka	G-Series	
2016	"Reshmi Churi"	Non-Album Single	Qinetic Music	
2016	"Amader Golpo" (with Shawon Gaanwala)	Non-Album Single	eTunes Entertainment	
2016	"Kotha Dao Tumi Thakbe Pashe" (with Imran)	Rhythmic Kona	CMV	
2016	"Cholonay" (Tanjib Sarowar)	Hridmohini	CD Choice	
2017	"Boishakher Bikel Balay" (with Akassh)	Non-Album Single	Unlimited Audio Video	
2017	"Icche Gulo" (with Akassh)	Icche Gulo	CMV	

1. Char Chokka Hoi Hoi also features Rahul Dev Kumar Pilli, Dilshad Karim Elita, Pantha Kanai, Johan Alamgir, Sanvir Huda, Badhon Sarkar Puja and Kaushik Hossain Taposh

=== Film soundtracks ===
Year	Film	Song	Music	Co-singer(s)	Label	Ref(s)
2015	Aashiqui	"Meyeder Mon Bojha"	Savvy Gupta		Jaaz Music, Eskay Music	
2015	Chhuye Dile Mon	"Shunno Theke Ashe Prem"	Sajid Sarkar	Imran	Girona Music	
2016	Niyoti	"Hai Allah"	Savvy Gupta		Jaaz Music Eskay Music	
2016	Ami Tomar Hote Chai	"Heila Duila Nach"	Akassh	Akassh	Unlimited Audio Video	
2016	Bossgiri	"Dil Dil Dil"	Shawkat Ali Emon	Imran	Lollipop	
2017	Shopno Bari	"Tomar Alo"	Sajid Sarkar	Tahsan	CD Choice	
2017	Valobasha Emoni Hoy	"Chumuke Chumuke Koro Pan"	Habib Wahid		Jaaz Music	
2017	Dhat Teri Ki	"Rongila Rongila"	Shouquat Ali Imon	Imran	Jaaz Music	
2017	Jhorer Pore	"Paglami"	Ahmmed Humayun	Belal Khan	CD Choice	
2017	Nabab	"O DJ"	Akassh	Akassh	Jaaz Music, Eskay Music	
2018	Super Hero	"Ek Poloke"	Ali Akram Shuvo	Imran Mahmudul		

=== Films ===
Year	Title	Role	Director	Notes	Ref(s)
2015	U Turn	Herself	Alvi Ahmed	Special Appearance	

== Awards and nominations ==
Year	Award	Category	Album/Song	Result
2013	Meril Prothom Alo Awards	Best Singer (Female)	Amor Kabyo	Nominated
2017	Meril Prothom Alo Awards	Best Singer (Female)	"Dil Dil Dil"	Won
2022	Bangladesh National Film Award	Best Female Playback Singer	"Tui Ki Amar Hobi Re" from Bishwoshundori	Won
2026	BIFA Awards	Best Singer	"Jodi Monta Churi Kori"	Won
