= Kangalini Sufia =

Bangladeshi folk singer

- কাঙ্গালিনী সুফিয়া
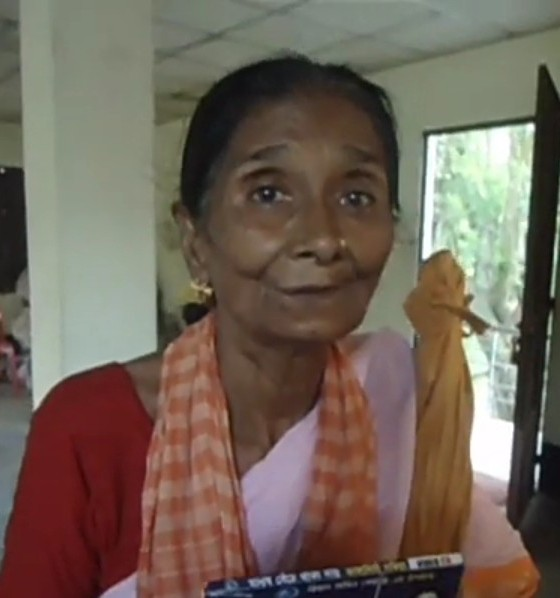
- Kangalini in 2019
- Born: Tuni Halder; 1958 or 1959 (age 66–67); Ramdia village, Rajbari District, Bangladesh
- Other names: Sufia Khatun
- Website: kangalinisufia.com

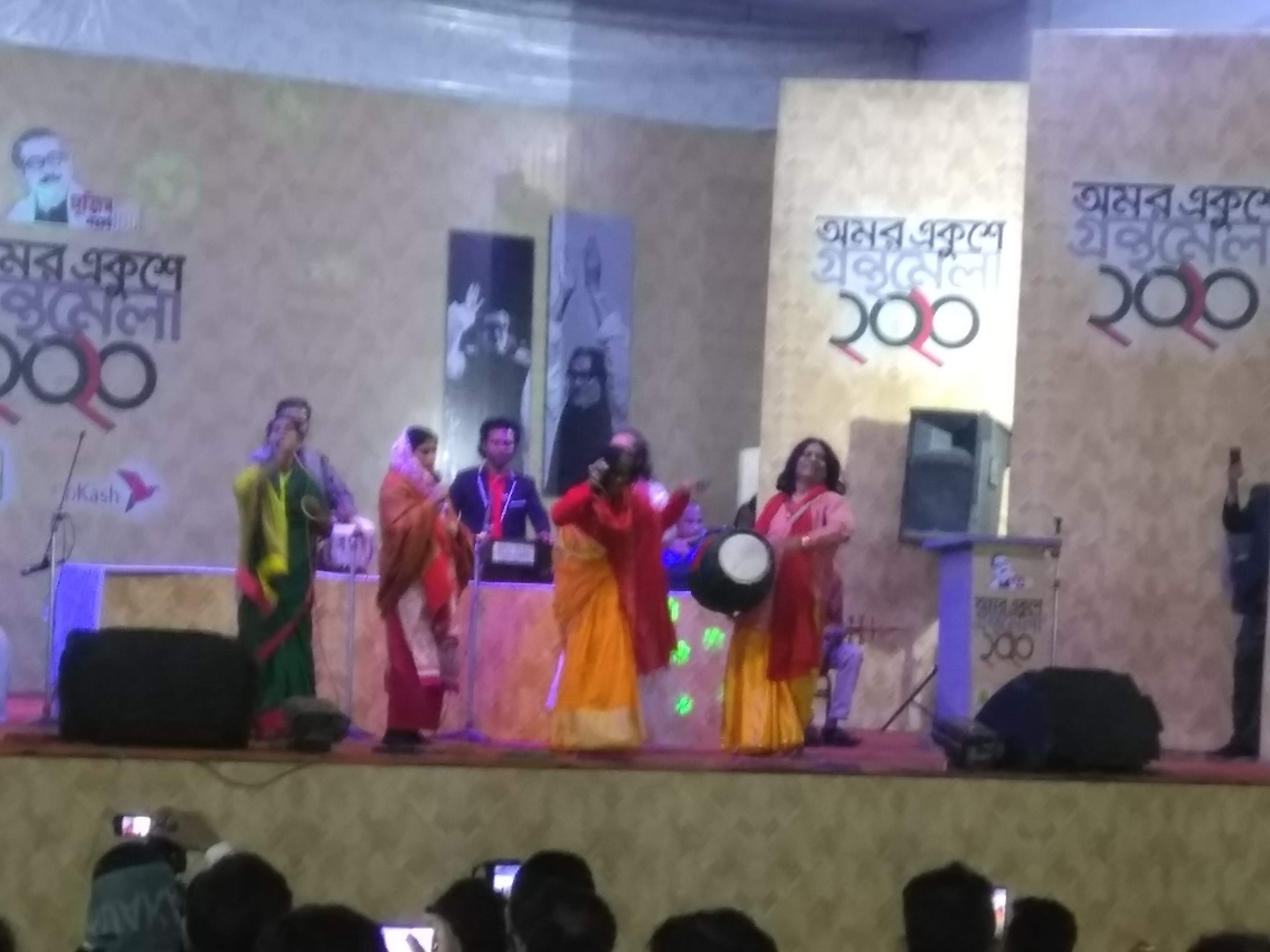
Kangalini Sufia performing during Ekushey Book Fair 2020 (2)

Kangalini Sufia (2nd from the right) and her team performing during Ekushey Book Fair 2020 at Bangla Academy.

Sufia Khatun (known as Kangalini Sufia; born 1 January 1961) is a Bangladeshi folk singer. Her real name is "Anita Halder". She performed as a playback singer for the films Darodi Shatru, Agun and Raj Shinghashon.

== Early life ==
Sufia was born in 1948/49 in greater Faridpur (now Rajbari) to Khokon Halder and Tulu Halder. At the age of 14/15, she began singing at village functions. Around 1974, she converted to Islam and took on the name Sufia Khatun. Artist Mustafa Monwar christened her "Kangalini Sufia".

== Music ==
Sufia mostly performs with a five-member troupe that includes Baul Jahangir, Baul Mander Fakir, Pushpo (Sufia's daughter), Chumki Kangalini (Sufia's granddaughter) and Bilkis Banu. She collaborated with other musicians including Kuddus Boyati, Abdur Rahman Boyati and Anusheh Anadil.

In October 2016, Sufia released her first CD album titled Ma.

== Notable songs ==
- Poraner Bandhob Re, Buri Hoilam Tor Karone
- Konba Pothey Nitaiganj Jai
- Amra Nari Koto Koshto Kori
- E Boro Ajab Kudrati

== Personal life ==
Sufia first married Sudhir Halder. Her second husband, Baul Sekom, is a Dotara player and lives in London where he works. On 8 December 2018, She was admitted with severe illness to Enam Medical College Hospital in Savar. After her medical examinations Doctor said, She has several problems including irregularities of blood circulation in her brain. She also has some problems in her heart. She is now living in Jamsing, Savar.
