= Shithi Saha =

Bangladeshi singer

Shithi Saha is a Bangladeshi singer. She has done playback in Projapoti (2011) film with veteran Ferdous Wahid. She sings Tagore songs, folk and also film songs. She has made four studio albums.

== Early life ==
Shithi learned music from her mother. Shithi's mentors were Ashok Saha and the late Ohaidul Huq. She learnt classical, folk and modern styles of music from Chhayanaut and Shommelon Parishad. She has won more than 100 Awards in those years, including four National Awards given for Rabindra Sangeet.

== Career ==
In 2005, Shithi debuted with the album Kichu Bolbo Bole, a compilation of Tagore songs. It gained popularity. In 2009, she published her second album Kolpona, containing 12 songs. She received national recognition with her first solo and third overall album, Golpo Patay. In 2015, she published her fourth album Mon Balika. On 13 March 2016, she was given a special honour at Indo-Bangladesh cultural festival, held in Auckland, New Zealand for her contribution in Bengali music. A musical programme, Shithir Otithi, is premiered on Maasranga Television.

== Discography ==
- Kichu Bolbo Bole (2005)
- Kolpona (2009)
- Golpo Patay (2011)
- Mon Balika (2015)
- "Raat Jaga Pakhi"
- "Unkey Khayalon Mein"

== Filmography ==
- Projapoti ('Taka' song with Ferdous Wahid)
- Pushpa ('Saami Saami' song in Bengali)

== Awards ==
- Bangladesh National Awards - Best Tagore Singer (4 times)
- Special honour at Indo-Bangladesh Cultural Festival, 2016
- Winner: Bachsas Awards for Best Female Playback Singer - 2016 for Bhola To Jayna Tare
