= Kazi Shuvo =

Bangladeshi Singer

Kazi Shuvo কাজী শুভ
- Born: Kazi Ashiqur Rahman Shuvo; 29 December 1984 (age 41)
- Occupation: Singer
- Website: www.kaishuvo.net

Kazi Ashiqur Rahman Shuvo (29 December 1984) is a Bangladeshi singer.

== Life and career ==
Kazi Ashiqur Rahman, nicknamed Kazi Shuvo, was born on 29 December 1984 to Kazi Shah Alam and Fatema Khatun, in Bijoypur village, Gournadi thana in Barisal district. Shuvo is youngest among two brothers and a sister. He has been brought up in the midst of songs and music since childhood.

His initiation in music was through his father's hands, in tabla. Institutionally he learnt playing tabla first from “Esho Gaan Shikhi” in Khulna and then from “Udichi”. Shuvo was in Khulna as his father was in service in Eastern Jute Mills Ltd. Khulna. Although Shuvo had just learnt playing tabla he had a great fascination with singing. His elder brother Kazi Atikur Rahman's singing would inspire him, from whose diary he memorized many songs.

Shuvo then came to Dhaka for his graduation. Gradually he started singing songs on stage. At times he would play tabla. But his dream, singing, remained unfulfilled, until he suddenly met Shahid Vi of the band Durbin at Dhanmondi-8. Shahid vi told him that, “You sing folk song well. You can join Durbin.”

In 2009, with Shahid vi's inspiration, Kazi Shuvo's solo album Shada Mata was released, with Arfin Rumey's composition. The folk songs in the album: "Sona Bou", "Tumi Bine Akul Poran", "Ojhor Shrabon", "Nilima", etc. After that Shuvo sang in different mixed albums. A song titled "Mon Pajor."

In 2012 Shuvo's 2nd solo album Shada Mata-2 was released, again with Arfin Rumi's composition. In 2013 he released another album, named Moner akash. In 2014 Shuvo's 3rd solo album Shada Mata-3 was released. This album was composed by Arfin Rumey and Rafi. “Diwana”, “Amar Bondhu”, “Tomar O Pirite Bondhu”. His 4th album Daga was released on the occasion of Eid-ul-Fitr in the year 2016. His 5th album Mayar agun was released on the occasion of the Eid-ul-Azha in the same year.

== Awards ==
- Kazi Shuvo achieved BEST SINGER on Saco Telefilm award 2014.
- Kazi Shuvo achieved BEST SINGER on Artist Journalist Foundation of Bangladesh music award for music album "ShadaMata 2" 2014
- Kazi Shuvo achieved BEST SINGER on Artist Journalist Foundation of Bangladesh music award for music album "Mayar Agun" 2016.
- Kazi Shuvo achieved BEST SINGER on DCRU showbiz award for music album "Daaga" 2016.

== Discography ==
- Shadamata - 2009
- Shadamata 2 - 2012
- Shadamata 3 - 2014
- Mayar Agun - 2016
- Daaga - 2016

=== Mixed album ===
- Toke Sara Raat
- Tin Pagol
- Anonder Gaan
- Dukkho Boli
- Saat Jonom
- Nilanjona
- Love Duets
- Jonom Jonom
- doobin 3.01
- Ridoy jurey
- Na bola valobasha,
- Maya Jhinai bondhu
- Ichchedana
- Rodela akash
- Buker pakhi
- Wada
- Trivuj prem
- Pappunno
- tui amar sob
- Premer Khela - Moni Chowdhury

== Movie song list ==
- Dure Dure Thaka - Lal Tip
- Pirates of the Blood Secret
