= Sabrina Porshi =

Bangladeshi singer (born 1996)

- সাবরিনা পড়শী
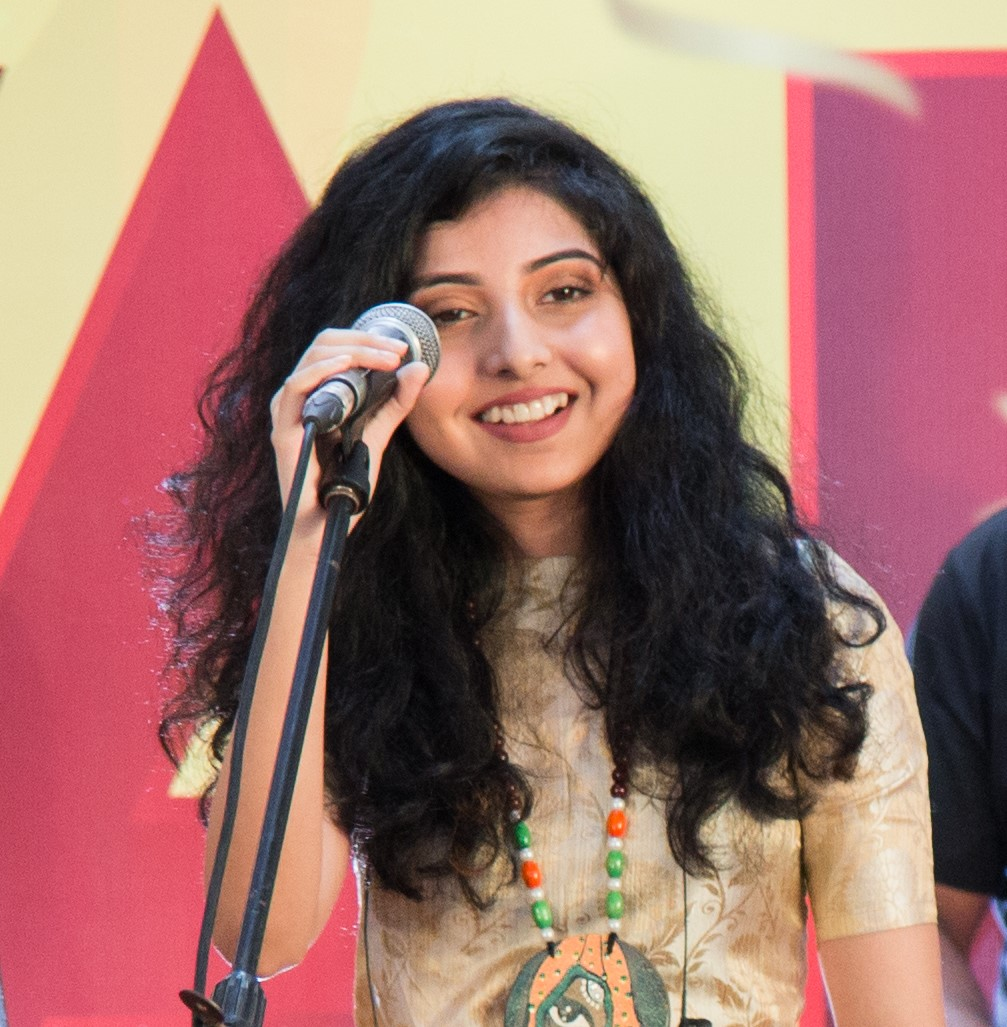
- Porshi in 2018
- Born: Sabrina Ehsan Porshi; 30 July 1996 (age 29); Dhaka, Bangladesh
- Occupations: Vocalist, model, playback singer, actress, radio jockey}
- Musical career
- Years active: 2008–present
- Labels: G-Series, CD Choice, CMV, Tips Industries (India)

Sabrina Ehsan Porshi (born 30 July 1996) is a Bangladeshi singer. Her career began when she was 2nd runner-up in a music talent hunt show, Channel i Khude Gaanraj, in 2008. Porshi's first song recording was for a movie in 2008 arranged by Khude Gaanraj team.

== Early life and music background ==
Porshi was born on 30 July to a Muslim family in Uttara, Dhaka, Bangladesh. Her home district is Brahmanbaria. Porshi lived at Uttara for 14 years. She moved to Cambrian College to study in commerce.

In 2007, Porshi took part in a singing competition named Komol Kuri organized by the government, and became winner in country song category. In 2008, Porshi participated in Channel i Khude Gaan Raaj Singing Competition, her first on-screen appearance. She became the second runner up.

=== 2008–2010 ===
Porshi started her music career professional when she was in Khude Gaan Raaj competition in 2008. She made her playback debut with the song Tumi Amar Bondhu Khelar Sathi in P.A. Kajal's Chachchu Amar Chachchu starring Shakib Khan with Emon Saha composition in 2010, although it was recorded in 2009, which was also her first studio recording. In 2009 she started the work of her solo album Porshi. She made the album with 5 music director. The album was finished in April 2010. The label Laser Vision released the album in Eid-ul-Fitr 2010.

=== 2011–2012 ===
After the first album, Porshi started to work as a playback singer from 2011. Her first recorded song in 2011 was "Kothao chile na tumi" with Arfin Rumey. On 14 February 2012 Porshi released her second solo album, Porshi 2. She also did playback songs in 2012. In 2012 Porshi announced her band named "Bornomala".

=== 2013–present ===
In Eid-ul-Fitr she released her third solo album Porshi 3. She made a cameo appearance with Shakib Khan in Shamim Ahamed Roni's action romantic Mental in 2016. In 2021, she became judge on a reality show "Young Star".

== Personal life ==
Porshi married Hamim Niloy, who lives in the USA, on 4 March 2024.

== Music videos ==
Her first music video was "Tomari porosh" with Arfin Rumey, from her first album Porshi. This video was directed by Rommo Khan. Then Porshi made another three music videos from her second solo album in 2012. "Khuje khuje", Shudhu tore and Boro Eka "Khuje khuje ft Arfin Rumey" and "Shudhu Tore ft ZooEL Morshed" and "Boro Eka".

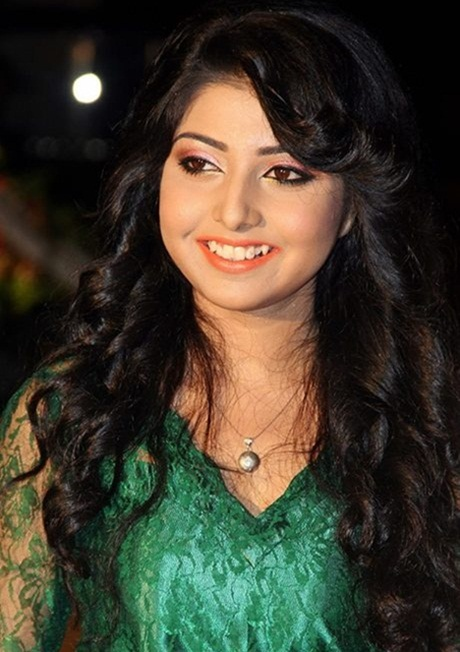
Porshi in 2013

In 2013 Porshi made her 5th music video from her album Porshi 3. Porshi and the composer and co-singer of this song Imran acted in this music video.

== Solo albums ==
Year	Name	Composer	lyricist	Co-Singer	Label
2010	Porshi	Arfin Rumey; Adit; Bappa Mazumder; Shondhi; Mahmud Sunny	Robiul Islam jibon Anurup Aich; Rana; Abdar Rahman; Kobir Bakul; Shakkhar Ehsan; Shondhi	Arfin Rumey	Laser Vision
2012	Porshi2	Arfin Rumey; Sajid sarkar Bappa Mazumder; Ibrar Tipu; Shondhi zooel morshed	Robiul Islam jibon Anurup Aich zahid akbar Mithila Ibrar; Russel o'neil ZooEL Morshed	Arfin Rumey; ZooEL Morshed	G-series
2013	Porshi3	Arfin Rumey; Bappa Mazumder; ZooEL morshed Dev Sen; Imran; Adit; Amlan & Pupun	Asif Iqbal; Junayed Wasi; Sohel Arman; Robiul Islam Jibon; Zulfiqer Russell; Shurid Sufiyan; Abdar Rahman; Priyo chatterjee Dibyendu	Arfin Rumey; Imran; Jaidev Sen; Shoeb; ZooEL Morshed	G-series

== Filmography ==
=== Appearance ===
Key
†	Denotes films that have not yet been released

Year		Role	Co-Artist	Director	Language	Notes
2016	Mental: It Can Be Your Love Story	Special Appearance	Shakib Khan	Shamim Ahamed Roni	Bengali	

== Television drama ==
Year	Name	Role	Director	Aired Channel	Notes
2022	Maria One Piece		Sajin Ahmed Babu	Rtv Drama	First TV Drama Eid Natok 2022
2023	Love Station		Mohidul Mohim	Sultan Entertainment	TV Drama
2023	Bhalobashi Tomake		S R Mozumder	CMV	TV Drama
2023	Bhalobasar Tin Din		Mohidul Mohim	Sultan Entertainment	TV Drama
2023	Monjure		Jakaria Showkhin	CMV	TV Drama
2023	Ekhane Prem Shekhano Hoy		Sajin Ahmed Babu	Rtv Drama	Eid Natok 2023
2023	Shadi Mubarak		Mahmud Emon	Sultan Entertainment	TV Drama
2024	Parbo Na Charte Toke		Mohidul Mohim	Sultan Entertainment	TV Drama
2024	Prothom Bhalobasa		Mahmudur Rahman Hime	KS Entertainment	TV Drama

=== Playback ===
Year	Film	Songs	Music Director	Co-Singer	Ref.
2010	Chachchu Amar Chachchu	Tumi Amar Bondhu	Emon Saha	Solo	
2015	Aro Bhalobashbo Tomay	Moner Duar	Habib Wahid	Habib Wahid	
2015	Aro Bhalobashbo Tomay	Tumi Amar	Hridoy Khan	Hridoy Khan	
2019	Shapludu	Kichu Swapno	Hridoy Khan	Hridoy Khan	

== Awards and nominations ==
Year	Award	Category	Album/Song	Result
2011	Meril Prothom Alo Awards	Best Singer Female	Nilanjona	Nominated
2013	Meril Prothom Alo Awards	Best Singer Female	Porshi 3	Nominated
