= Fakir Alamgir =

Bangladeshi folk and pop singer (1950–2021)

Fakir Alamgir ফকির আলমগীর
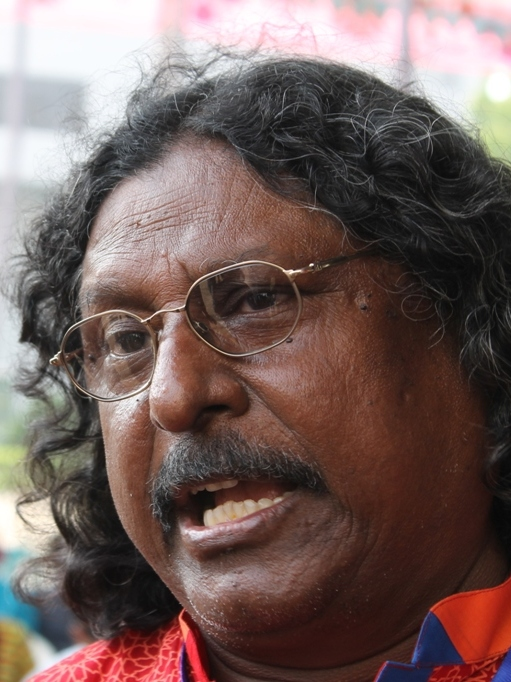
- Alamgir in February 2014

Background information
- Born: 21 February 1950; Shonamukhirchar Village, Kalamridha Union, Bhanga Upazila, Faridpur District, Dhaka Division, Bangladesh (Then under East Bengal, part of the Dominion of Pakistan)
- Died: 23 July 2021 (aged 71) Dhaka, Bangladesh
- Years active: 1966–2021
- Spouse: Suraiya Alamgir Anarkali

Fakir Alamgir (21 February 1950 – 23 July 2021) was a Bangladeshi folk and pop singer. He was awarded Ekushey Padak in 1999 by the Government of Bangladesh.

== Early life ==
After the Bangladesh Liberation War in 1971, he emerged as a Gono Sangeet (inspiration songs for the masses) singer. Some of his notable songs are "O Sokhina", "Shantahar", "Nelson Mandela", "Naam Tar Chhilo John Henry" and "Banglar Comrade Bondhu".

== Career ==
Alamgir started his music career in 1966. He played his role as a singer in 1969 uprising in East Pakistan.

Alamgir worked with Swadhin Bangla Betar Kendra during the liberation war in 1971.

Alamgir was the founder of the cultural organization "Wrishiz Shilpi Gosthi" in 1976. He served as the president of Gono Sangeet Shamanya Parishad (GSSP) .

Alamgir published his first book Chena China in 1984. His next two publications were Muktijuddher Smriti Bijoyer Gaan and Gono Sangeeter Otit O Bortoman. In 2013 he published three books - Amar Kotha, Jara Achhen Hridoy Potey and Smriti Alaponey Muktijuddho. He authored nine books.

== Personal life ==
He was married to Suraiya Alamgir Anarkali. He has 3 sons. His son Dr. Fakir Mashuque Alamgir Rajeeb is an assistant professor of Electrical and Electronic Engineering(EEE) at East West University who is married to someone names Tania Sultana. His other son's are bankers.

== Death and legacy ==
On 14 July 2021, Alamgir was admitted to United Hospital in Dhaka with COVID-19 related complications. He suffered a heart attack on 23 July while in ventilation at the COVID-19 unit and died on the same day.

In 2023, Road No 6 of Chowdhurypara neighborhood in Khilgaon Thana in Dhaka was officially renamed as "Fakir Alamgir Road" by Atiqul Islam, the mayor of Dhaka North City Corporation.

== Works ==
- Desh Deshantor
- Shadhinota Sangram Laal Shobujer Potakay
- Shongskritite Amader Muktijuddho
- Mayer Mukh

== Awards ==
- Ekushey Padak (1999)
- Bhashani Padak
- Sequence Award of Honour
