= Zhilik =

Zhilik জানিতা আহমেদ ঝিলিক
- Born: Zanita Ahmed Zhilik; 4 November 1993 (age 32); Rangpur, Bangladesh
- Genres: Pop; Classical
- Occupation: Singer
- Years active: 2008 - present
- Labels: Dhruba Music Station; Soundtek; Laser Vision

Zanita Ahmed Zhilik simply known as Zhilik is a Bangladeshi singer. She works in many music albums and singles with many well known artists. She was champion of the Channel i musical reality show Shera Kontho in 2008.

== Early life ==
Zhilik was born in Rangpur. Her family was culturally oriented. She started learning music from her father. Her father was an enlisted singer of Bangladesh TV and radio.

== Discography ==
- Amar Ki Dosh (2009)
- Jhilik (2012)
- Prothom Prem (2014)
