= Kaushik Hossain Taposh =

Bangladeshi musician

- কৌশিক হোসেন তাপস
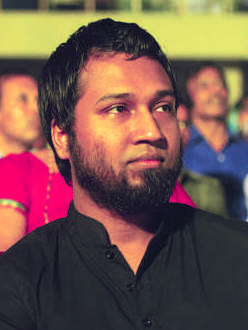
- Born: 8 November 1983 (age 42)
- Occupations: Music composer, MD & CEO of Gaan Bangla & OMZ Group
- Years active: 1991-present
- Notable work: Wind of Change
- Spouse: Farzana Arman Munny
- Children: 3
- Awards: Bangladesh National Film Award for Best Music Composer

Kaushik Hossain Taposh (born 8 November 1983) is a Bangladeshi music composer, producer, and musician. He is also serving as the managing director and CEO of One More Zero Group & Gaan Bangla TV. He is the creator of the music television series Wind of Change. He is managing director and CEO of Gaan Bangla. At age 31, Taposh broke another record by becoming the youngest person to be given a Bangladesh National Film Award for Best Music Composer for a film song composition for the film Purno Doirgho Prem Kahini (2013). In 2018, he won the Mother Teresa International Award on behalf of TM Productions for his 'Wind of Change- Music for Peace' campaign.

== Career ==
At the age of eight, Taposh released his first music album, Pakihder Pathshala (Birds' School), on February 21, 1991, at Ekushey Book Fair. He studied at the Bangladesh Institute of Broadcasting Art (BIBA). He took singing lessons at Shishu Academy, and learned folk music at Chhayanaut.

Taposh created Gaan Bangla, a music streaming television network, in 2013 and introduced top artists through his channel with music videos, refraining from broadcasting any kind of other programs. The channel plays both English and Bangla music.

Taposh is the brainchild and the lead composer of 'Wind of Change' - a multi dimensional musical platform of the world with its headquarters in Bangladesh.

Taposh's television channel Gaan Bangla was vandalised on 4 August 2024. Taposh was arrested on 4 November 2024 after the fall of the Sheikh Hasina-led Awami League government. He was made an accused in an attempted murder case of a rickshaw driver during the protests against Sheikh Hasina. He was one of 109 people charged in that case along with former prime minister Sheikh Hasina.

== Music videos ==
Year	Album	Songs	Music	Singer(s)	Lyrics	Notes
2018	Lovely Accident	"Lovely Accident" ft Sunny Leone and Krushna Abhishek	Kaushik Akash Guddu (KAG) for JAM8	Taposh, Harjot Kaur	Shloke Lal	

Year	Album	Songs	Music	Singer(s)	Lyrics	Notes
2020	Nit Din Jiyan Maran	"Nit Din Jiyan Maran" ft Nargis Fakhri	Aditya Dev for MB Music	Taposh	Kumaar	

Year	Album	Songs	Music	Singer(s)	Lyrics	Notes
2020	Oti Shundor Ghor	"Oti Shundor Ghor" by Taposh	Taposh for TM Records	Taposh	Keshab Ghosh	
2022	Premer Laddu	"Premer Laddu" ft Tama Mirza	Taposh for TM Records	Resmi Mirza	Taposh	

== Personal life ==
Taposh is married to Farzana Arman Munny. Together they operate the OMZ group. Farzana Arman Munny is a beautician and a fashion designer from Bangladesh. She is also the owner of the women's beauty platform Que-Bella. They have three children.
