= Minar Rahman =

Bangladeshi singer-songwriter

- মিনার রহমান
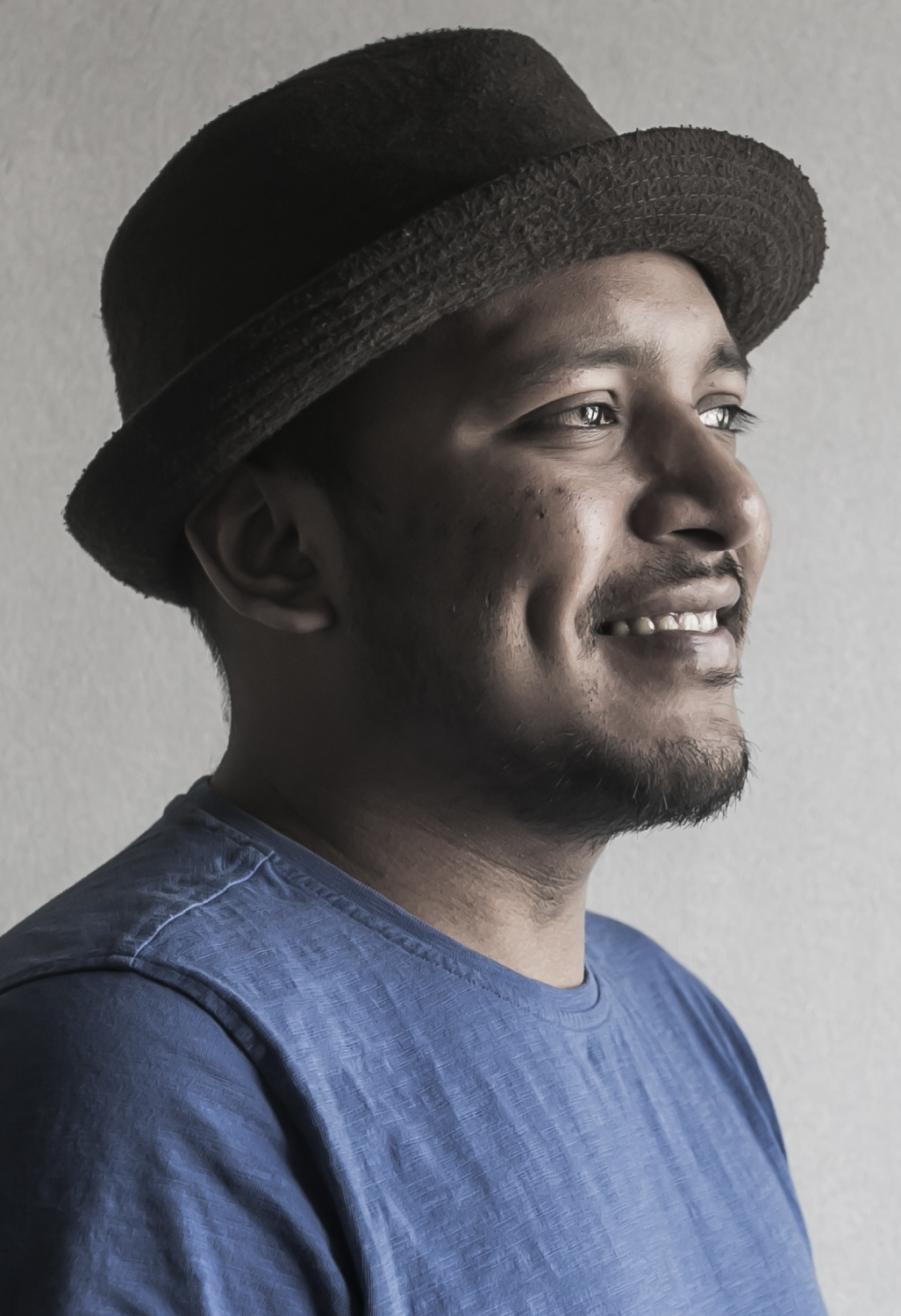
- Born: Mohammad Mizanur Rahman Minar; 26 December 1992 (age 33); Chittagong, Bangladesh
- Other name: Minar
- Education: American International University-Bangladesh
- Occupations: Singer-songwriter; composer; cartoonist
- Years active: 2008–present
- Musical career
- Genres: Pop; R&B; Country; Indian Film Pop
- Instruments: Guitar; piano; vocals
- Labels: G-Series; Soundtek
- Website: facebook.com/FollowMinar

Mohammad Mizanur Rahman Minar (Bengali: মোহাম্মদ মিজানুর মিনার রহমান; born 26 December 1992), known as Minar Rahman (Bengali: মিনার রহমান) is a Bangladeshi singer-songwriter, composer, lyricist, writer and cartoonist. He came to public attention in 2008 with the release of his debut solo album Danpitey, which was entirely written, composed, and performed by himself.

== Career ==
Minar started his musical life by the inspiration of his father. Minar became famous after releasing his song "Shada", which was written, composed and sung by Minar and music was arranged by Tahsan. His first solo album Danpitey released in 2008, second solo album Aari got released in 2011. His third solo album is Aha Re, which was released on 6 June 2015. In 2013 he worked on a mixed album named The Hit Album 4. His songs "Jhoom" and "Keu Kotha Rakheni" are two of the most-viewed Bangladeshi songs on YouTube.

In addition to music, he has pursued multiple artistic avenues: he has worked as a cartoonist for the satirical magazine Unmad since 2008, and he debuted as a novelist with Rudro Ebong Ekti Grand Piano at the Ekushey Book Fair in 2019.

== Discography ==
=== Studio albums ===
Year	Album	Label	Reference
2008	Danpite	G-Series	
2011	Ari	G-Series	
2015	Aha Re	G-Series	
2016	Duur Theke	Gaanchill Music	
2016	Deyale Deyale	CD Choice	

=== EPs ===
Year	Album	Label	Reference
2016	Deyale Deyale	CD Choice	
2017	Rong Pencil	Dhruba Music Station	

=== Compilation albums ===
Year	Album	Label	Notes	Reference
2016	Spotlight on Minar	GP Music	Released exclusively by GP Music	

=== Singles ===
Year	Song	Label	Notes	Reference
2016	"Poth"	Tiger Media		
2016	"Jhoom"	Gaanchill Music	From the album Duur Theke	
2016	"Chader Golpo"	Eagle Music		
2016	"Khoj"	CMV		
2016	"Lukiye Thaka"	Gaanchill Music		
2016	"Shomoy"	Gaanchill Music		
2016	"Ki Kori"	Gaanchill Music		
2017	"Dhaka"	Eagle Music		
2017	"Keu"	Eagle Music		
2017	"Karone Okarone"	Eagle Music		
2017	"Ta Jani Na"	Gaanchill Music		
2017	"Minar's Chokh"	CMV		
2017	"Abar"	Sangeeta		
2017	"Aalo Nei Aalote"	Soundtek		
2017	"Durey Hariye" (Sajid Sarkar featuring Minar)	CD Choice		
2017	"Ki Tomar Naam"	Gaanchill Music		
2020	"Keu Kotha Rakheni"	N/A		

=== Guest appearances ===
Year	Album	Song	Label	Reference
2009	The Hit Album 2	"Karo Karo"		
2010	FnF	"Neel"		
2010	Click Click	"Charchina Ar Pichu"		
2013	The Hit Album 4	"Biporite"		
2013	Neelpori Neelanjona	"Opekkha"		
2013	Impossible 5	"Cholo Harai"		
2013	Neel Projapoti	"Vul Shohore"		
2014	Life and Fiona	"Aahare"		

=== Soundtracks ===
Year	Film	Song	Composer	Label	Notes	Reference
2018	Fidaa	"Eka Din"	Arindam Chatterjee	SVF Music	Indian Bengali film	
