= Belal Khan =

Bangladeshi singer and music composer

- বেলাল খান
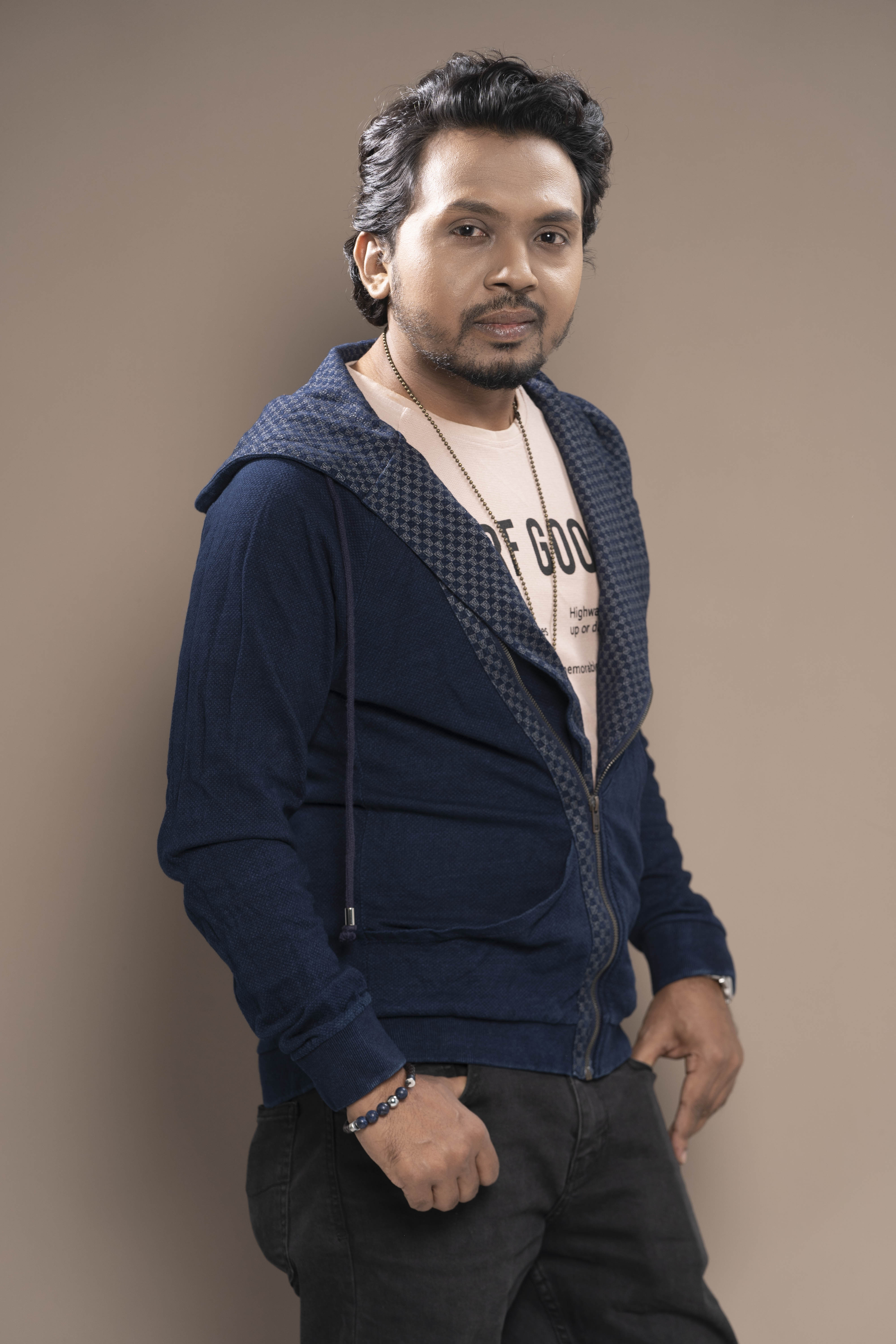
- Khan in 2018
- Born: February 3, 1984 (age 42); Nalua, Sakhipur, Tangail, Bangladesh
- Years active: 2006-present
- Awards: National Film Awards (2014), 45th Bangladesh National Film Awards (2020)

Belal Khan (Bengali: বেলাল খান; born 3 February 1984) is a Bangladeshi singer, songwriter and music composer.

He was awarded 39th Bangladesh National Film Awards (2014) for Best Music Composition in 2016 by the Government of Bangladesh for his music composition in the film Nekabborer Mohaproyan (2014). He also has won the 45th Bangladesh National Film Awards (2020) as the Best Music Director for the film Bishshash Jodi Jayre.

== Early life ==
Belal Khan is born in Nalua village of Sakhipur in Tangail district. He has completed honors and masters in Persian Language Literature from Dhaka University. In 2011, he gained popularity by singing "Pagol Tor Jonno Re" with Nancy. After that, he regularly created and lent his voice to title songs of films, mixed albums and plays.

== Career ==
In 2011, Belal debuted his career in music composition through the film "Pagol Tor Jonno Re". His composition of the song "Nishipokkhi" earned him the national award. The song was written by Masud Pathik and sung by Momtaz Begum. Both were also awarded for the same song in their respective categories. Belal Khan has lent his voice to a song in Persian in filmmaker Ananta Jalil's new film 'Din – The Day'. The song is further lent its voice to Iranian actor and singer Mohammad Reza Hedayati. He has sung the song written by Ziauddin Alam and composed and composed by the Rabbi in hassan fouaad's under-production film 'Kanta'. Belal Khan has sung the title song of the film 'Jao Pakhi Bolo Tare' directed by Mostafizur Rahman Manik.

== Albums ==
Release	Album name	Category	Notes
2012	Alapon	Solo albums	
2015	Ar Aktibar	Solo albums	
2021	Pakhi	Solo albums	
2015	Achinpur	Duet Album	
2021	Beche Thakar Jonno	Solo albums	
	Ekla Prohor	Duet Album	
2016	Onuvobe	Duet Album	
2016	Premanuvuti		

== Awards ==
- 39th Bangladesh National Film Awards (2014); Category: Best music composer; Film: Nekabborer Mohaproyan.
- 45th Bangladesh National Film Awards (2020) - Category: Best Music Director- Film: Hridoy Jurey
- BACHSAS Award 2014- Category: Best Singer
- BACHSAS Award 2016- Category: Best Singer
