= Arfin Rumey =

Bangladeshi composer (born 1983)

- আরেফিন রুমি
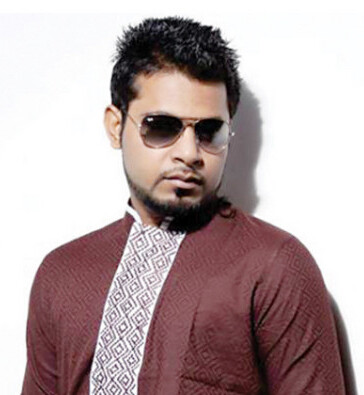
- Born: Shah Mohammad Arfin Rumey; 23 September 1983 (age 42); Dhaka, Bangladesh
- Education: Jagannath University
- Occupations: Singer, composer, lyricist, musician
- Musical career
- Genres: Classical, modern, pop, folk, EDM
- Instruments: Keyboard, guitar, flute, percussion
- Years active: 2007–present

Arfin Rumey (born 23 September 1983) is a Bangladeshi singer, musician, composer, and model. He was awarded the 15th Meril-Prothom Alo Awards-Best Singer (2012) and the 16th Meril-Prothom Alo Awards-Best Singer (2013).

== Biography ==
Rumey was born on 23 September 1983 in Dhaka. He completed his Secondary School Certificate (SSC) from Dhaka Government Muslim School and his Higher Secondary Certificate (HSC) from Sharawardi College. He later earned an honours degree in Finance and Banking from Jagannath University. He also studied audio engineering. He was a cricketer and played as an all-rounder for several clubs in Dhaka.

== Music projects ==
=== Solo albums ===
Year	Album	Co-artists	Music director	Lyricist
2008	Arfin Rumey	Ananna	Arfin Rumey	Anurup Aich, Fuad Hasan, Saki Ahmed, Shuvo, Roj & Arfin Rumey
2009	Eshona	Shiti Saha	Arfin Rumey	Anurup Aich, Fuad Hasan, Sumi, Afrin Jessica, Gunjon Chowdhury, Foysal & Arfin Rumey
2011	Bhalobashi Tomae	Nancy, Shubhomita, Kheya & Porshi	Arfin Rumey	Anurup Aich, Zahid Akbar, Robiul Islam Jibon, Shafiq Tuhin, Sohel Arman & ATM Mushfiqur Rahman
2013	Porojonom	Porshi, Kheya, Puja & Naumi	Arfin Rumey	Arfin Rumey
2015	Kichu Kotha Akashe Pathao	Nodi	Arfin Rumey	Zahid Akbar, Nasima Akhter & Arfin Rumey
2016	Tomari Naame	Porshi & Sheniz	Arfin Rumey	Faisal Rabbikin
2016	Sotti Kore Bol	Porshi & Oyshee	Arfin Rumey	Zahid Akbar & Faisal Rabbikin

=== Mixed and featuring albums ===
Year	Album	Co-artists	Music director	Lyricist
2009	Sada Mata	Arfin Rumey ft Kazi Shuvo	Arfin Rumey	
2010	Ek Nimishe	Arfin Rumey ft Sayera Reza	Arfin Rumey	Anurup Aich, Sayera Reza, Shahan, Zahid Babul & Shafiq Tuhin
2010	Na Bola Bhalobasha	Arfin Rumey, Shahid, Kazi Shuvo, T.W. Shoinik, Arnik, Champa Bonik, Ayub Shahriar & Fazlur Rahman Babu	Arfin Rumey	
2011	Nilanjona	Arfin Rumey, Nancy, Mila, Porshi, Shahid, Subhomita, Ayub Shahriar & Kazi Shuvo	Arfin Rumey	Anurup Aich, Zahid Akbar, Shahid, Robiul Islam Jibon, Fuad Hasan, Odhi & Foysal
2012	Chaya Chobi (movie album)	Arfin Rumey, Avijit, Akriti Kakkar, Shaan, Anwesha, Raghab, June Bannerjee, Nishita & Porshi	Arfin Rumey	Moushumi, Kabir Bokul, Marjuk Rasel, Robiul Islam Jibon & Arfin Rumey
2012	Sada Mata-2	Arfin Rumey ft Kazi Shuvo	Arfin Rumey	
2013	Mon Chuye Dekho	Arfin Rumey, Ananna, Shohag Ali, Kheya, Opu Rahman, Shahrid Belal, Kamrul Ahamed, Riyad, Shanto, Fahad, Ashraf Rana, Mim, Rashed & Tropa	Arfin Rumey	
2013	Mon Mane Na	Arfin Rumey ft Kheya	Arfin Rumey	Anurup Aich, Zahid Akbar, Robiul Islam Jibon, Sumon Emdad & Arfin Rumey
2013	Ore Piya	Arfin Rumey, Kazi Shuvo, Eleyas Hossain, Kheya, Ayon Chaklader, Anik Sahan, Naumi, Shahrid Belal, Shohag Ali, Shan & Luna	Arfin Rumey	
2014	Tarkata (movie album)	Arfin Rumey, Sunidhi Chauhan, Palak Muchhal, Mamta Sharma, Kheya, Puja, Liza, Naumi, Kona, & Parvez	Arfin Rumey	Anurup Aich, Zahid Akbar, Kabir Bokul, Mahmood Manzoor & Arfin Rumey
2014	Ador	Arfin Rumey, Liza, Fahmida Apon, Naumi, Shanto, Nadim, Puja, Shoshi, Shariar Bandhan, Mamun, Moidul, Deepon & Apon Khan	Arfin Rumey	
2015	Sweety	Arfin Rumey ft Sweety	Arfin Rumey	Arfin Rumey
2015	Khola Chithi	Arfin Rumey ft Mahidul Raj	Arfin Rumey	
2016	Sheniz	Arfin Rumey ft Sheniz	Arfin Rumey	Faisal Rabbikin, Zahid Hasan Abhi & Arfin Rumey
2016	Odhora	Arfin Rumey ft Shofi Mondol	Arfin Rumey	
2017	Dehobazi	Kazi Shuvo, Kheya, Oyshee, Sharalipi & Tanvir Tareq	Arfin Rumey	Zahid Akbar, Tarek Ananda & Someshwar Oli

=== Film playback ===
Year	Film
2008	Projapoti
2011	Common Gender
2012	Chorabali
2012	Chaya Chobi
2012	Most Welcome
2013	Eito Bhalobasha
2014	Hero: The Superstar
2014	Taarkata
2014	Prem Korbo Tomar Sathe
2014	Pita Putrer Golpo
2015	Most Welcome 2
2015	Cheleti Abol Tabol Meyeti Pagol Pagol
2015	Lal Tip
2015	Gangster Returns
2015	Game
2016	Samraat: The King Is Here
2017	Mastan O Police
2017	Game Returns
2018	Jannat

== TV shows ==
Show	Channel	Years
Smile Show	ATN Bangla	2011–present
Poriborton	BTV	2016–present

== Actor in film and drama ==
Year	Title	Medium
2013	Priyo Maa	Film
2013	Chaya Chobi	Film
2017	Game Returns	Film
2018	Jannat	Film

== Awards ==
Year	Award	Category	Result
2012	15th Meril-Prothom Alo Awards	Best Singer	Won
2013	16th Meril-Prothom Alo Awards	Best Singer	Won
—	Urocola Award	Winner (3 times)	Won
2016	Bangla Media Award	—	Won

== Personal life ==
He married Lamiya Islam Ananna; they have one son, but they are divorced. His second marriage is with Kamrun Nessa.
