= List of songs recorded by Habib Wahid =

This article lists songs sang, composed and recorded by Habib Wahid.

== Studio albums ==
=== Moina Go (2004) ===
Moina Go

Studio album by Habib Wahid
- Released: December 31, 2004
- Genre: World; Pop; EDM; Hip Hop; R&B
- Length: 44:00
- Language: Bengali
- Label: Ektaar Music
- Producer: Habib Wahid

Habib Wahid served as the composer and producer of the album while Julie, Ferdous Wahid, Nirjhor, Milon Mahmud & Konika featured as singers. This was Wahid's debut solo album, as well his debut as a vocalist, singing the songs "Din Gelo" and "Esho Brishti Namai (Raat Nirghum)".

No.	Title	Length
1.	"Moina Go" (featuring Julie)	4:12
2.	"Ami Ek Paharandar" (featuring Ferdous Wahid)	5:16
3.	"Deshlai" (featuring Nirjhor)	4:59
4.	"Din Gelo"	5:40
5.	"Taarey Bhabley Ki Ar" (featuring Milon Mahmud)	5:29
6.	"Esho Brishti Namai"	4:50
7.	"Jaa Rey" (featuring Julie)	4:37
8.	"Kobitate" (featuring Konika)	6:07
9.	"Moina Go (Extended Mix)" (featuring Julie)	3:46
Total length:		44:00

=== Shono (2006) ===
Shono

Studio album by Habib Wahid
- Released: November 9, 2006
- Genre: World; Pop; Hip Hop; R&B; EDM
- Length: 42:00
- Language: Bengali
- Label: Laser Vision
- Producer: Habib Wahid

Habib Wahid served as the composer and producer of the album. Wahid also served as main vocalist, singing every song except "Calenderer Pata", which was sung by his father Ferdous Wahid.

No.	Title	Length
1.	"Shopner Cheyeo Modhur"	3:54
2.	"Jadu"	5:35
3.	"Mon Munia"	5:47
4.	"Elomelo Mon"	4:10
5.	"Projapoti"	4:36
6.	"Ei Shomoye"	4:48
7.	"Calenderer Pata" (featuring Ferdous Wahid)	4:40
8.	"Poran Pakhi"	4:50
9.	"Ekhoni Nambe Brishti"	4:00
Total length:		42:00

=== Bolchhi Tomake (2008) ===
Bolchhi Tomake

Studio album by Habib Wahid
- Released: February 17, 2008
- Genre: World; Pop; R&B
- Length: 38:11
- Language: Bengali
- Label: Sangeeta
- Producer: Habib Wahid

All lyrics written by Susmita Biswas Sathi.

No.	Title	Length
1.	"Akangkha"	4:54
2.	"Ek Mutho Bhalobasha"	4:20
3.	"Ekjone"	5:44
4.	"Godhuli Logon" (featuring Nancy)	4:42
5.	"Koutuhol"	4:29
6.	"Nishi Kabbo"	4:29
7.	"Pran Bondhu"	4:14
8.	"Shurjomukhi Prem"	4:00
9.	"Shubhro Chand"	5:39
Total length:		38:11

=== Ahoban! (2011) ===
Ahoban!

Studio album by Habib Wahid
- Released: June 1, 2011
- Genre: Pop; World; R&B; Dance
- Length: 40:24
- Language: Bengali
- Label: Deadline Music
- Producer: Habib Wahid; Sajid Sarker

Habib Wahid composed the songs of the album, and produced the album alongside Sajid Sarker. The album included Nancy and Kona as featured artists, as well as Ferdous Wahid, who sang the song "O Mishti Meye".

All lyrics are written by Shaquie Ahmed, Ilias Mollah, Mahbub Mohsin, Sushmita Biswas Sathi, Ferdous Wahid.

No.	Title	Length
1.	"Ahoban"	5:17
2.	"Tumi Je Amar Thikana" (featuring Nancy)	5:07
3.	"Ar Nei Bhalobasha"	4:17
4.	"Ki Je Holo Aaj" (featuring Nancy)	4:27
5.	"Ek Jhak Payra"	4:07
6.	"Lukochuri" (featuring Kona)	3:38
7.	"Bhule Jeyona Amay"	4:25
8.	"Chokhe Chokhe Ratri Holo"	5:11
9.	"O Mishti Meye" (performed by Ferdous Wahid)	3:54
Total length:		40:24

=== Shadhin (2012) ===
Shadhin

Studio album by Habib Wahid
- Released: September 1, 2012 (Digital Streaming); December, 2012 (CD)
- Genre: Pop; World; R&B; Tropical
- Length: 39:35
- Language: Bengali
- Label: Deadline Music
- Producer: Habib Wahid

Habib Wahid serves as the composer, producer, and sole vocalist of this album.

No.	Title	Length
1.	"Hawa Ure Jay"
2.	"Kuasha"
3.	"Abar Jodi Ami"
4.	"Nishi Furay Na"
5.	"Tomar Amar Prem"
6.	"Mon Mouri"
7.	"Kichu Smriti"
8.	"Akashe Urilam"
Total length:		39:35

=== Collaborative albums ===
==== Krishno (with Kaya) (2003) ====
Krishno

Studio album by Habib Wahid & Kaya
- Released: 2003
- Genre: Folk; World; Pop
- Length: 52:59
- Language: Bengali
- Label: Ektaar Music
- Producer: Habib Wahid

Habib Wahid served as the composer and producer of the album while Kaya sung the songs. This was Habib Wahid's debut album.

No.	Title	Length
1.	"Krishno"	5:24
2.	"Doyal"	4:54
3.	"Ami Kul Hara Kalongkini"	5:52
4.	"Kemonay Vulibo Aami"	4:06
5.	"Gaan Gai Aamar"	5:36
6.	"Kala"	5:28
7.	"Aaj Pasha Khelbo"	5:20
8.	"Din Galo Din"	5:40
9.	"Krishno (Remix)"	5:08
10.	"Aaj Pasha (Instrumental)"	5:17
Total length:		52:59

==== Maya (with Kaya & Helal) (2004) ====
Maya

Studio album by Habib Wahid, Kaya & Helal
- Released: 2004
- Genre: Folk; World; Pop; Hip hop; Reggae; Rock
- Length: 61:02
- Language: Bengali
- Label: Ektaar Music
- Producer: Habib Wahid

Habib Wahid served as the composer and producer of the album while Kaya and Helal sung the songs. Kunel was also featured artist on the album.

No.	Title	Singer(s)	Length
1.	"Asi Bole Gelo Bondhu" (featuring Kunel)	Kaya	4:49
2.	"Bandhua" (featuring Kunel)	Kaya	4:20
3.	"Baula"	Kaya	4:22
4.	"Doya"	Helal	5:46
5.	"Kanai"	Kaya	4:30
6.	"Kuhu Shure Moner Agun"	Helal	5:42
7.	"Loke Bole"	Kaya	4:43
8.	"Maya"	Helal	5:02
9.	"Mon Mojaiya"	Helal	4:35
10.	"Ochin Desher"	Helal	6:40
11.	"Shona Bondhu"	Helal	5:22
12.	"Shona Bondhu"	Kaya	5:07
13.	"Where's My Baby Gone" (featuring Kunel)	Kaya	4:16
Total length:			61:02

==== Panjabiwala (with Shireen) (2007) ====
Panjabiwala

Studio album by Habib Wahid & Shireen Jawad
- Released: 2007 (CD); 9 November 2014 (Digital streaming)
- Genre: Folk; World; Pop; R&B
- Language: Bengali
- Label: Laser Vision
- Producer: Habib Wahid

Habib Wahid served as the composer and producer of the album, while Shireen Jawad sung every song, except "Bole Toh Diyechi Hridoyer Kotha", which was sung by Habib Wahid featuring Nancy.

No.	Title	Singer	Length
1.	"Panjabiwala"	Shireen Jawad	4:13
2.	"Moner Bagane"	Shireen Jawad	3:57
3.	"Ore Amar Moyna Pakhi"	Shireen Jawad	3:45
4.	"Shikhaya Piriti"	Shireen Jawad	5:33
5.	"Shahjalal Shahporan"	Shireen Jawad	3:50
6.	"Na Jene Bhul Bujhona"	Shireen Jawad	4:26
7.	"Prem Nodite"	Shireen Jawad	4:49
8.	"Khaja Tor Preme Ami"	Shireen Jawad	4:41
9.	"Bole Toh Diyechi Hridoyer Kotha" (featuring Nancy)	Habib Wahid	5:33

==== O Bosheshe (with Ferdous Wahid) (2008) ====
O Bosheshe

Studio album by Habib Wahid & Ferdous Wahid
- Released: 2008 (CD); 21 March 2016 (Digital streaming)
- Genre: Folk; World; Pop; R&B
- Length: 42:00
- Language: Bengali
- Label: Sangeeta
- Producer: Habib Wahid

No.	Title	Singer	Length
1.	"Keno Emon Hoy"	Habib Wahid	4:37
2.	"Cholte Cholte Dekha Holo"	Habib Wahid	5:18
3.	"Neel Jochona"	Ferdous Wahid	3:45
4.	"Dukkho Chuye Dekho"	Ferdous Wahid	4:26
5.	"Fire Ashona"	Habib Wahid	4:46
6.	"Katena Mayabi Raat"	Habib Wahid	4:50
7.	"Valo Lage"	Ferdous Wahid	4:40
8.	"Chokhe Chokhe"	Ferdous Wahid	4:02
9.	"Keno Emon Hoy" (Instrumental)		4:33
Total length:			42:00

==== Shomorpon (with Aurthohin and Warfaze) (2011) ====
Shomorpon

Studio album by Habib Wahid, Aurthohin & Warfaze
- Released: 2011
- Genre: Folk; World; Rock
- Language: Bengali
- Label: Deadline Music
- Producer: Habib Wahid; Aurthohin; Warfaze

No.	Title	Artist	Length
1.	"Barir Pashe Arshinogor"	Warfaze (Mizanur Rahman)	6:36
2.	"Khachar Bhitor Ochin Pakhi"	Warfaze	5:43
3.	"Jat Gelo Jat Gelo Bole"	Warfaze (Mizanur Rahman)	4:52
4.	"Keno Piriti Barailare Bondhu"	Habib Wahid	5:46
5.	"Loke Bole Bole Re"	Aurthohin (Saidus Salehin Khaled Sumon)	3:41
6.	"Matir O Pinjira"	Aurthohin (Saidus Salehin Khaled Sumon)	5:45
7.	"Ekdin Tor Hoibore Shoron"	Aurthohin (Saidus Salehin Khaled Sumon)	3:43

==== Rong (with Nancy) (2012) ====
Rong

Studio album by Habib Wahid & Nancy
- Released: 2012
- Genre: World; Pop; R&B
- Length: 40:32
- Language: Bengali
- Label: Deadline Music
- Producer: Habib Wahid

Habib Wahid produced and composed the album while Nancy sung the songs, with the exception of "Jhora Pata", which was a duet between Habib Wahid and Nancy, and "Dubechi", which included Mithun as a featured artist.

All lyrics are written by Susmita Biswas Sathi, Mahbub Mohshin, Mozammel Hoque & Sharmin Sultana Shumi.

No.	Title	Singer(s)	Length
1.	"Birohi Purnima"	Nancy
2.	"Jhora Pata"	Habib Wahid & Nancy
3.	"Megh Madol"	Nancy
4.	"Bondhur Lagiya"	Nancy
5.	"Dubechi" (featuring Mithun)	Nancy
6.	"Jhorna Pahar Nodi"	Nancy
7.	"Pasha Nei Tumi"	Nancy
8.	"Ichche"	Nancy
9.	"Maya"	Nancy
Total length:			40:32

== Singles ==
Year	Name	Label	Notes	Reference
2015	"Hariye Fela Bhalobasha"	Sangeeta		
2016	"Tomar Akash"	Robi Yonder		
2016	"Moner Thikana"	Multisourcing Ltd		
2016	"Beporawa Mon"	Unlimited Audio Video	Featured in the 2016 film Ami Tomar Hote Chai	
2016	"Meghe Dhaka Shohor" (with Nirjhor)	CD Choice	Featured in the 2015 TV serial Meghe Dhaka Shohor	
2016	"Tumi Amar" (with Nancy)	CD Choice	From the soundtrack Sultana Bibiana	
2016	"Ei Bangla Ei Manush"	Sangeeta	Released for the World Bank's End Poverty Day	
2017	"Tumi Hina"	HW Productions		
2017	"Mitthe Noy"	Dhruba Music Station		
2017	"Ghum"	Sangeeta		
2017	"Golaper Din" (featuring Nancy)	HW Productions		
2017	"Tor E Janalay" (with Nancy)	HW Productions		
2018	"Cholo Na"	Gaanchill Music	Music composed by Fuad	
2022	"Beni Khuley"	Qinetic Music	Singer: Muza & Habib Wahid Music: Russell Ali, Muza & Fuad Lyrics: Faujia Sultana & Muza Mix & Master: Greg R Cha	

== Film soundtracks ==
=== As composer ===
Year	Film	Song	Singer(s)	Label	Notes	Ref(s)
2005	Hridoyer Kotha	"Valobashbo Bashbo Re (Version 1)"	Habib Wahid	Laser Vision		
2005	Hridoyer Kotha	"Valobashbo Bashbo Re (Version 2)"	Habib Wahid	Laser Vision		
2008	Akash Chhoa Bhalobasa	"Hawai Hawai Dolna Dole"	Habib Wahid & Nancy	Agniveena		
2008	Akash Chhoa Bhalobasa	"Prithibir Joto Shukh"	Habib Wahid & Nancy	Agniveena		
2008	Amar Ache Jol	"Cholo Brishtite Bhiji" (Solo)	Habib Wahid	Impress Telefilm		
2008	Amar Ache Jol	"Cholo Brishtite Bhiji" (Duet)	Habib Wahid & Sabina Yasmin	Impress Telefilm		
2008	Chandragrohon	"Tomare Dekhilo"	Habib Wahid & Nancy	Laser Vision		
2008	Chandragrohon	"Moner Jore Cholse Deho"	Habib Wahid	Laser Vision		
2009	Third Person Singular Number	"Didha" (Male)	Habib Wahid	Impress Telefilm		
2009	Third Person Singular Number	"Didha" (Female)	Nancy	Impress Telefilm		
2009	Third Person Singular Number	"Didha" (Duet)	Habib Wahid & Nancy	Impress Telefilm		
2009	Eito Prem	All Songs	Various Artists	Sangeeta	The film was released in 2015.	
2010	Khoj: The Search	"Etodin Kothay Chile"	Habib Wahid & Nancy	Monsoon		
2010	Khoj: The Search	"Dinete Shurjo Bhalo"	Ferdous Wahid & Kona	Monsoon		
2011	Projapoti	All Songs	Various Artists	G-Series		
2012	The Speed	"Akasher Vaje"	Habib Wahid & Nancy	Eagle Music		
2012	The Speed	"Akasher Vaje (Version 2)"	Habib Wahid & Nancy	Eagle Music		
2012	Tumi Shondharo Meghmala	All Songs	Various Artists			
2012	I Love You	"Preme Porechi"	Habib Wahid	Fahim Music		
2014	Bindaas	"Tomake Chere Ami"	Habib Wahid & Tulsi Kumar	SVF Music	West Bengali Film Debut into Indian Film Industry Recreation of "Hridoyer Kotha" from Wahid's album Panjabiwala	
2015	Chhuye Dile Mon	"Bhalobasha Dao, Bhalobasha Nao "	Habib Wahid	Girona Music		
2015	Aro Bhalobashbo Tomay	"Moner Duar"	Habib Wahid & Porshi	TOT Films		
2016	Sweetheart	"Bhalobasha Holo Na"	Habib Wahid & Nancy	Tiger Media		
2016	Aynabaji	"Dhire Dhire Jaw Na Somoy"	Habib Wahid & Anweshaa	Half Stop Down		
2016	Ami Tomar Hote Chai	"Beporowa Mon"	Habib Wahid			
2016	Sultana Bibiana	"Tumi Amar"	Habib Wahid & Nancy	CD Choice		
2017	Valobasha Emoni Hoy	"Chumuke Chumuke Koro Pan"	Kona	Jaaz Music		
2017	Rajneeti	"O Akash Bole De Na Re"	Kheya & Shafayet	Sony DADC Bengali		

=== As singer ===
Year	Film	Song	Label	Notes	Ref(s)
2005	Hridoyer Kotha	"Valobashbo Bashbo Re (Version 1)"	Laser Vision		
2005	Hridoyer Kotha	"Valobashbo Bashbo Re (Version 2)"	Laser Vision		
2008	Akash Chhoa Bhalobasa	"Hawai Hawai Dolna Dole" (with Nancy)	Agniveena		
2008	Akash Chhoa Bhalobasa	"Prethebir Joto Shukh" (with Nancy)	Agniveena		
2008	Amar Ache Jol	"Cholo Brishtite Bhiji" (Solo)	Impress Telefilm		
2008	Amar Ache Jol	"Cholo Brishtite Bhiji" (Duet) (with Sabina Yasmin)	Impress Telefilm		
2008	Chandragrohon	"Tomare Dekhilo" (with Nancy)	Laser Vision		
2008	Chandragrohon	"Moner Jore Cholse Deho"	Laser Vision		
2009	Third Person Singular Number	"Didha" (Male)	Impress Telefilm		
2009	Third Person Singular Number	"Didha" (Duet) (with Nancy)	Impress Telefilm		
2009	Eito Prem	"Ami Tomar Moner Bhetor" (with Nancy)	Sangeeta	The film was released in 2015.	
2009	Eito Prem	"Hridoye Amar Bangladesh" (with Arfin Rumey & Predeep Kumar)	Sangeeta	The film was released in 2015.	
2009	Eito Prem	"Hridoye Amar Bangladesh (Slow)" (with Arfin Rumey & Predeep Kumar)	Sangeeta	The film was released in 2015.	
2009	Eito Prem	"Ami Tomar Moner Bhetor (Slow)" (with Nancy)	Sangeeta	The film was released in 2015.	
2010	Khoj: The Search	"Etodin Kothay Chile" (with Nancy)	Monsoon		
2011	Projapoti	"Projapoti" (Title Song) (with Kona)	G-Series		
2011	Projapoti	"Doob"	G-Series		
2012	The Speed	"Akasher Vaje" (with Nancy)	Eagle Music		
2012	The Speed	"Akasher Vaje (Version 2)" (with Nancy)	Eagle Music		
2012	Tumi Shondhar O Meghmala	"Dheere Dheere" (with Nancy)	G-Series		
2012	Tumi Shondhar O Meghmala	"Dheere Dheere (Slow Version)"	G-Series		
2012	Tumi Shondhar O Meghmala	"Ontohin"	G-Series		
2012	Tumi Shondhar O Meghmala	"Tumi Janona" (with Nancy)	G-Series		
2012	Tumi Shondhar O Meghmala	"Bhalobashar Swapno"	G-Series		
2012	I Love You	"Preme Porechi Ami"	Fahim Music		
2014	Bindaas	"Tomake Chere Ami" (with Tulsi Kumar)	SVF Music	West Bengali Film Debut into Indian Film Industry Recreation of "Hridoyer Kotha" from Wahid's album Panjabiwala	
2015	Chhuye Dile Mon	"Bhalobasha Dao, Bhalobasha Nao"	Girona Music		
2015	Mon Janena Moner Thikana	"Bhalobeshe Kache Eshe" (with Nancy)	Impress Telefilm Ltd		
2015	Aro Bhalobashbo Tomay	"Moner Duar" (with Porshi)	TOT Films		
2015	Eito Prem	"Ami Tomar Moner Vitor" (with Nancy)			
2016	Sweetheart	"Bhalobasha Holo Na" (with Nancy)	Tiger Media		
2016	Aynabaji	"Dhire Dhire Jaw Na Somoy" (with Anweshaa)	Half Stop Down		
2016	Ami Tomar Hote Chai	"Beporowa Mon"			
2017	Sultana Bibiana	"Tumi Amar" (with Nancy)	CD Choice		
2022	Golui	" Amar Bhalobasa" (with Jerin)			
2022	Operation Sundarbans	"Ovimani Riddure" (with Sanzida Mahmood Nandita)			
2024	Toofan	Phese jai			

== Guest appearances ==
Year	Artist	Song	Album	Label	Reference
2009	Various Artists	"Tumi Amar Jibone Eso"	The Gurus of Love		
2009	Various Artists	"Tumi Amar Jibone Eso (Remix)" (with Fuad)	The Gurus of Love		
2015	Rafat	"Amar Monta"	Musafir Mon	Suranjali	
2015	Various Artists	"Cholo Bangladesh" (Habib Wahid featuring Emil & Zohad)	Cholo Bangladesh	GP Music	
