= Rangeela (album) =

Studio album by Shireen Jawad
- Released: 8 April 2013
- Genre: Bengali; folk music; dance music
- Length: 37:43
- Language: Bengali
- Label: Laser Vision

Shireen Jawad chronology
Mathwali (2009)	Rangeela (2013)

Rangeela is the third studio album by English singer Shireen Jawad, released on 8 April 2013 by Laser Vision.

== Composition and release ==
Rangeel features nine folk songs composed by eight prominent fusion composers of Bangladesh, of which two are traditional and seven are new. Habib Wahid, Bappa Mazumder, Fuad, Hridoy Khan, Rumel, Rumman, Rafa and Raihan have composed songs for the album.

The album was released by Laser Vision on 8 April 2013. Laser Vision launched the music video of "Chengra Chabiwala" as part of the promotion.

== Track listing ==
No.	Title	Length
1.	"Rangeela"	4:55
2.	"Chengra Chabiwala"	3:38
3.	"Bhalobasha Bhalolaga"	4:46
4.	"Kaala Chand"	4:13
5.	"Khaza"	4:19
6.	"Ronger Phool"	3:53
7.	"Kon Joubone"	4:52
8.	"Shei Kolpona"	4:07
9.	"Deewana"	3:02
Total length:		37:43
