= Anila Naz Chowdhury =

Anila Naz Chowdhury আনিলা নাজ চৌধুরী
- Born: Anila Naz Chowdhury; November 23, 1979 (age 46); Dhaka, Bangladesh
- Origin: United States
- Genres: Pop, rock
- Occupation: Singer
- Instrument: Vocals
- Years active: 2003– present
- Label: G-Series
- Formerly of: Kranti
- Website: www.myspace.com/anilanaz

Anila Naz Chowdhury (born November 23, 1979) is a Bangladeshi singer who started her musical career as a part of the band Kranti. She is best known for her collaborations with Fuad al Muqtadir and her duet album Ekhon Ami with Sumon.

== Music career ==
After Kranti disbanded, she collaborated with Fuad for his albums, and has sung at least one song in all of his albums, except one. Among them the most notable is "Ke Bashi Bajay Re". She also introduced singer Topu to Fuad, which led to their album "Bondhu Bhabo Ki". Fuad's 2015 album "Hit Factory" included her song "Itihaash".

Her duet album Ekhon Ami with Sumon became a top seller in both Bangladesh and India. The songs "Gaibona", Shopnogulo Tomar Moto", "Shobar Jonno Bhabcho Tumi" became chartbusters. After much delays, its sequel Ekhon Ami-2 is scheduled for a July 2015 release.

== Live performances ==
Anila performs at various international events such as Adhunika's fifth anniversary gala at New York, Fuad Live at Bangladesh China Friendship Conference Centre, Dhaka in 2008, Bangladesh Day 2009 at Chicago, AABEA Biennial Convention 2010, Indo-Bangladesh Concert 2010 by djuice at Dhaka, Serenity at Markham Theatre, Toronto, 2013, Journey of Hope by Spreeha Foundation at Bellevue, Washington in 2015.

== Personal life and other careers ==
She had worked for Microsoft Corporation as a software test engineer for couple of years between her universities. After shifting to Bangladesh, she became a lecturer at North South University, Dhaka.

== Discography ==
Year	Released as	Single Name	Album	Collaboration Artists
2004	Band Album	(11 songs)	Kranti	Kranti
2005	Collaboration Album	Jhil Mil	Re/Evolution	Fuad
2006	Collaboration Album	Daak Diacheen	Variation No. 25	Fuad
2007	Collaboration Album	Ke Bashi Bajay Re	Bonno	Fuad
2007	Featured artist	Ghum Ashena	Boka Manushta	Sumon
2007	Duet Album	(11 songs)	Ekhon Ami	sabuj, billal
2008	Featured artist	Nupur II	Bondhu Bhabo Ki	Topu, Fuad
2009	Collaboration Album	Ami Ke	Radio Mania Vol.3	Topu
2009	OST	Sesh Chithi	Third Person Singular Number	Fuad, Topu
2015	Collaboration Album	Itihaash	Hit Factory	Fuad
2015	Natok OST	Manbona	Chinigura Prem	Fuad, Tahsan
TBA	Duet Album	(9 songs)	Ekhon Ami 2	Sumon, Rafa
