= Shono =

Shono may refer to:

== People ==
- Junzo Shono (庄野 潤三 1921–2009), Japanese novelist
- Haruhiko Shono (庄野 晴彦, Shōno Haruhiko, born 1960), Japanese computer graphics artist
- Yoriko Shono (笙野 頼子, Shōno Yoriko, born 1956), Japanese writer

== Other ==
- Shono (album) (Bengali: শোন! Śōna; Listen!), Bengali-language pop album by Habib Wahid 2006
- Shōno-juku (庄野宿, Shōno-juku), forty-fifth of the fifty-three stations of the Tōkaidō, located in former Ise Province
