= Moner Vitor =

Song by Habib Wahid and Nazmun Munira Nancy

from the album Eito Prem
- Language: Bengali
- Released: September, 2009 (audio); November, 2017 (video)
- Recorded: 2009
- Genre: Feature Film Song
- Length: 5:39
- Label: Sangeeta Music (audio); G-Series (video)
- Composer: Habib Wahid
- Lyricist: Sohel Arman
- Producer: Habib Wahid

Eito Prem track listing
- 1. "Moner Bhetor"; 2. "Jotsna Debo"; 3. "Jak Na Ure"; 4. "Modhuboner Phool"; 5. "Hridoye Amar Bangladesh"; 6. "Hridoye Amar Bangladesh" (slow); 7. "Moner Bhetor" (slow)

Music video
- "Moner Vitor" on YouTube

Moner Vitor (also popular first stanza as Ami Tomar Moner Vitor) is 2009 Bengali language song, which was used in the soundtrack of the film Eito Prem released in 2014. The song sung by Habib Wahid and Nazmun Munira Nancy, which composed and music arranged by Habib Wahid himself. The song penned by Sohel Arman, who was also the director, screenwriter and choreographer of the film.

== Background ==
Sohel Arman penned the lyrics as per the script after signing Habib Wahid for the music arrangement of the song. He usually stayed awake at night to write songs. Arman threw out the draft lyrics of the song as it was not suitable for the film. Subsequently, his mother Suraiya Akhter Chowdhury read the first two lines of the draft lyrics "Ami tomar Moner Vitor Ekbar Ghure Ashte Chai / Amay Kotota Bhalobasho Se Kota Jante Chai" and encouraged Arman to write the full lyrics of this song. Arman wrote all the seven songs for the film, but it took him four months to write this song. Habib Wahid composed two versions with this lyrics of this song, the other version was slower. Although Arman kept both versions in his film.

== Filming ==
The song was shot at Baliati Palace and Kairi village in Manikganj, in where performed protagonist Shakib Khan and Afsana Ara Bindu. Director Sohel Arman had to pay a fine for spoiling mustard seeds due to overcrowding during the filming of this song in a Mustard field.

== Release and reception ==
The song was released in September, 2009 as an audio with film's soundtrack album under the banner of Sangeeta Music. After its release, it gained incredible popularity, although the film was released in 2015. This song widely influence audience to this film. Wahid and Nancy performed this song many times in their concerts. There are examples of the song being performed on music-themed reality television shows. On November 14, 2017, almost 8 years after the audio release, G-Series released the video of the song on their YouTube channel.

== See also ==
- Tumi Amar Jibon
- Tor Premete
- Harabo Toke
- Chumma
- Eshwar
- O Priyotoma
