= I Love You (2012 film) =

2012 Bangladeshi film directed by Mushfiqur Rahman Gulzar

- Movie poster
- Directed by: Mushfiqur Rahman Gulzar
- Written by: Mushfiqur Rahman Gulzar
- Produced by: Goyas Miah Raj; Mushfiqur Rahman Gulzar
- Starring: Shakib Khan; Purnima; Nirob; Racy
- Cinematography: Mojibul Haque Bhuiyan
- Edited by: Munir Hossain Abul
- Music by: Emon Saha; S.I. Tutul; Habib Wahid; Hridoy Khan; Background music Syed Mukhlesur Rahman
- Production company: Mumi Filmyard
- Distributed by: Impress Telefilm; Mumi Filmiyard
- Release date: 3 February 2012
- Running time: 150 (minutes YouTube version)
- Country: Bangladesh
- Language: Bengali

I Love You is a 2012 Bangladeshi romantic film directed by Mushfiqur Rahman Gulzar and co-produced with Goyas Miah Raaj. It features an ensemble cast including Shakib Khan, Purnima, Nirob, Racy, Ilias Kanchan, Omar Sani, Shahnaz, Shahidul Alam Sachchu, Afzal Sharif, and Gulshan Ara Ahmed.

The film's soundtrack was composed by Habib Wahid, Hridoy Khan, S.I. Tutul and Emon Saha, with background music by Syed Mokhlisur Rahman. The film was edited by Munir Hossain Abul, with cinematography by Mujibul Haque Bhuiyan and choreography by Masum Babul and Habibur Rahman Habib.

The film was released in cinemas on 3 February 2012.

Bappa Mazumder and Dilshad Nahar Kona won a Citycell–Channel i Music Award in the motion picture soundtrack Popular Choice category.

== Cast ==
- Shakib Khan as Akash
- Dilara Hanif Purnima as Bipasha
- Nirob
- Racy
- Ilias Kanchan
- Omar Sani
- Shahnaz
- Shahidul Alam Sachchu
- Afzal Sharif
- Gulshan Ara Ahmed
- Marjina
- Abu Sayeed Khan
- Shamsuddin Tagar
- Nasir Khan Chowdhury

== Production ==
The film was shot mainly in Bangkok, Thailand using 35mm-film stock. It is the sixth film directed by Mushfiqur Rahman Gulzar.

== Soundtrack ==
I Love You

Soundtrack album by Habib Wahid, Hridoy Khan, S.I. Tutul and Emon Saha
- Released: 17 January 2010
- Genre: Feature Film Soundtrack
- Length: 44:26
- Language: Bengali
- Label: Fahim Music
- Producer: Mushfiqur Rahman Gulzar; Goyas Miah Raaj

Habib Wahid chronology
The Speed (2012)	I Love You (2012)	Bindaas (2014)

Hridoy Khan chronology
Amar Praner Priya (2009)	I Love You (2012)	Ant Story (2013)

S.I. Tutul chronology
Akash Chhoa Bhalobasa (2008)	I Love You (2012)	Ghetuputra Komola (2012)

Emon Saha chronology
Matir Thikana (2011)	I Love You (2012)	Ghetuputra Komola (2012)

The soundtrack of the film was composed by Habib Wahid, Hridoy Khan, S.I. Tutul and Emon Saha, and consists of nine songs. All the songs were written by Shafiq Tuhin, Kabir Bakul and Mushfiqur Rahman Gulzar. The soundtrack album was released on 17 January 2010.

Track Listing
No.	Title	Singer(s)	Length
1.	"Preme Porechi Ami"	Habib Wahid	5:26
2.	"Tumi Manush Naki Pori"	Hridoy Khan	4:35
3.	"Kache Ele"	Hridoy Khan, Elita Karim	4:37
4.	"Tumi Dure Keno"	Samina Chowdhury, S.I. Tutul	5:27
5.	"Tumi Acho Sarabela"	S.I. Tutul, Nazmun Munira Nancy	5:21
6.	"Akash Aaj Roder"	Hridoy Khan, Elita Karim	4:35
7.	"Cheleta Bhalobesheche"	S.I. Tutul, Sonia	4:43
8.	"Eki Lojja"	Bappa Mazumder, Dilshad Nahar Kona	4:24
9.	"I Love You Theme"	Remixed	5:18
Total length:			44:26

== Awards and nominations ==
=== 7th Citycell–Channel i Music Awards (2011) ===
Channel i Music Award for Playback Singer (popular choice)

- Won: Bappa Mazumder and Dilshad Nahar Kona - Eki Lojja
