= Shah Abdul Karim =

Bangladeshi musician (1916–2009)

Baul Shah Abdul Karim
- শাহ আবদুল করিম
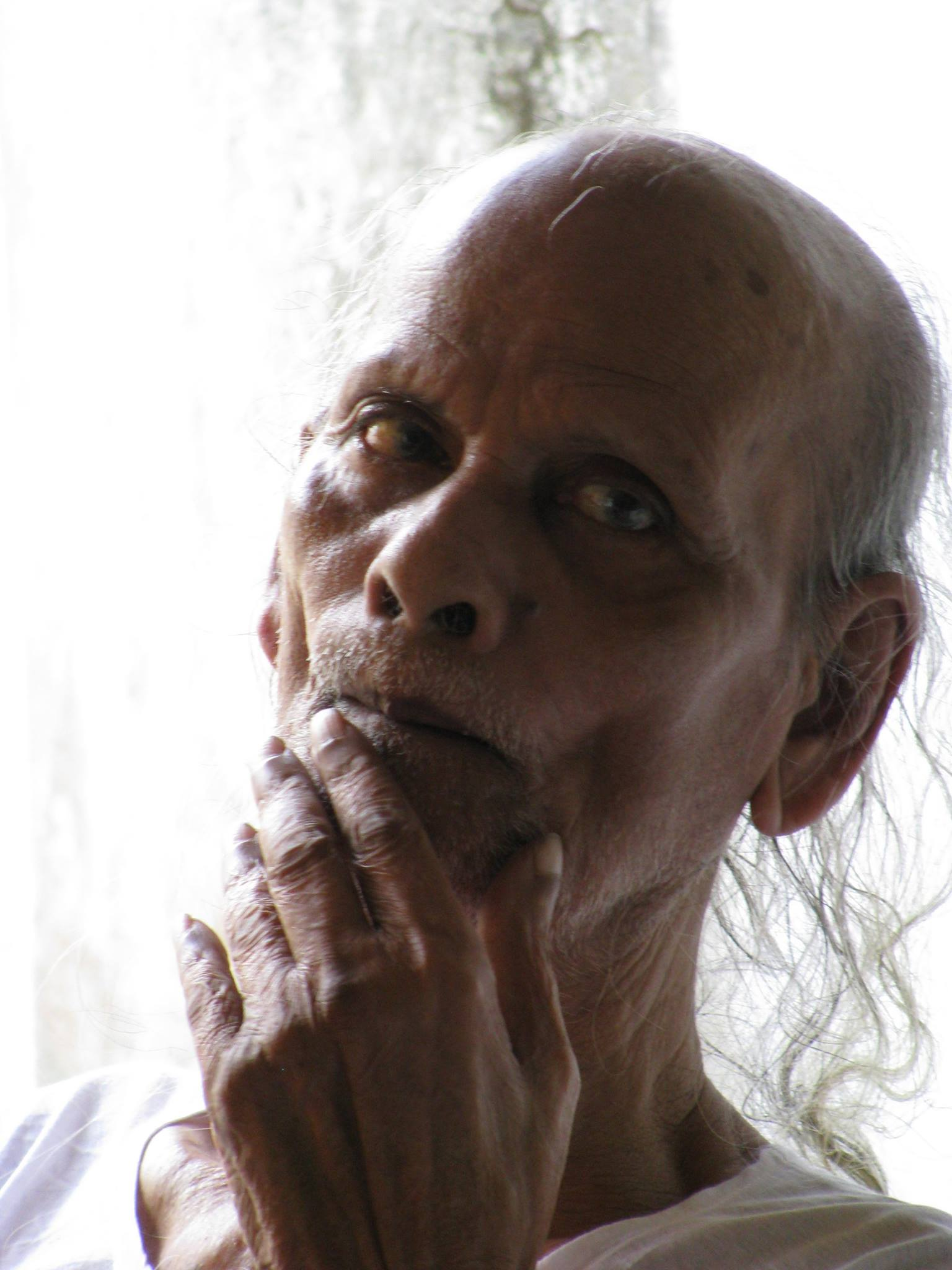
- Born: 15 February 1916; Derai, Assam Province, Sylhet, British India
- Died: 12 September 2009 (aged 93); Sunamganj, Sylhet, Bangladesh
- Occupations: Singer; songwriter
- Awards: Ekushey Padak
- Musical career
- Genres: Baul, folk
- Instruments: Vocal, ektara
- Website: shahabdulkarim.com

Baul Shah Abdul Karim (Bengali: শাহ আবদুল করিম; 15 February 1916 – 12 September 2009) was a Bangladeshi Baul musician and philosopher. Widely regarded as one of the greatest Baul musicians of all time, he was called Baul Samrat (The Baul Emperor). The Government of Bangladesh awarded him the Ekushey Padak, the country's second highest civilian decoration, in 2001. Alongside his enormous discography of Baul music, Karim had contributed significantly to developing the Baul philosophy; his work is generally seen as the refined continuation of classic Bauls like Fakir Lalon Shah. Beyond Baulism, Karim's multidisciplinary contribution to several sectors, including body theory, Sufism, Ma'rifa, and revolutionary music has made him one of the enduring examples of Bangladeshi secular pluralism.

== Early life ==
Karim was born on 15 February 1916 in Derai in Sunamganj, Sylhet. He took his initial lessons in Baul music and philosophy from Baul Rashid Uddin and Baul Shah Ibrahim Mastan Baksh. In 1957, Karim began living in Ujan Dhol, a village near his home, with his wife, Aftabunnesa Bibi, whom he adoringly called Sarala (a simple girl).

== Personal life ==
Contradicting the Baul tradition of lifelong celibacy, Shah Abdul Karim was married and had a son, Shah Nur Jalal, who followed in his footsteps in becoming a Baul himself.

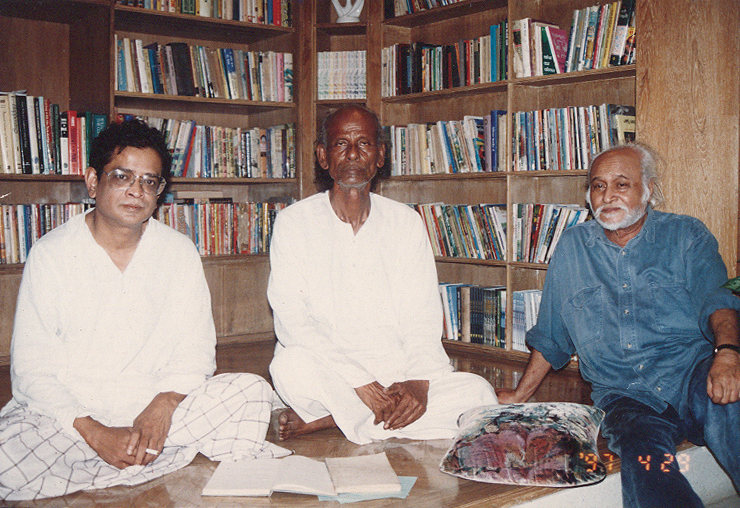
Humayun Ahmed, Shah Abdul Karim, and Abul Khayer in 1996

Despite finding fame as a musician, Karim took farming as his primary profession and was a farmer until his old age.

Karim died in Sylhet on 12 September 2009 due to respiratory problems.

== Works ==
Karim wrote and composed over 1600 songs. The Bangla Academy has translated ten of his songs into the English language.

Karim's songs are organised in six books:

- Aftab Sangeet (1948)
- Gano Sangeet (1957)
- Kalnir Dheu (1981)
- Dholmela (1990)
- Bhatir Chithi (1998)
- Kalnir Kooley (2001)

=== Notable songs ===
- Jhil Mil Jhil Mil Kore re
- Bonde Maya Lagaise
- Ashi Bole Gelo Bondhu
- Keno Piriti Baraila Re Bondhu
- Gari Cholena Cholena
- Ami Koolhara Kolonkini
- Agey Ki Shundor Din Kataitham
- Ami Tomar Koler Gari
- Shokhi Kunjo Shajao
- Ailai Na Ailai Na
- Boshonto Batashey
- Tumi Bine Akul Poran
- Ager Bahaduri Ekhon Gelo Koi
- Periti Modur Milona
- Ar Kichu Chay Na Mone Gaan Chara
- Notun Preme Mon Mojaia Korilam Ki Mosto Vul
- Murshid Dhono He Kemone Chinibo Tomare
- Bondhure Koi Pabo Shokhi Go
- Mon Mojale Ore Bawla Gan
- Shokhi Tora Prem Koriona
- Nao Banailo Banailo Re Kon Mestori
- Amar Hat Bandhibi Pao Bandhibi
- Rako Ki Maro Ay Doya Kora
- Ami Gaan Gaite Patina
- Bhob Shagorer Naiya
- Prane Ar Shohena Darun Jala Moron Bala
- Dorodiya Re Bondu Dorodiya Re
- Tumar O Pirite Bondu Re Bondu
- Ami Bangla Maa Er Chele
- Jigash Kori Tumar Kache
- Hingshakur Bole Abdul Karim Neshakur
- Rongila Baroy
- Kemone Bulibo Tara
- Huru Takte Je Jaitam Nanar Bari
- Fua Furi Boya Hattor Tali Diya
- Gaan Gai Amar Monre Bujay
- Mohajone Banaiase Moyur Phonki Nau

== Legacy ==
Karim's work had fallen out of the mainstream until the early 2000s, when Habib Wahid released his debut album, Krishno. The album was heavily influenced by Bangladeshi British musicians of Sylheti origin, such as Kaya, who were acquainted with Karim's music. Krishno introduced the Bangladeshi audience to their first taste of folk fusion and was an instant hit.

Subsequently, several famous Bangladeshi artists, including Dolchut and Muza, sang their own renditions of Karim's songs.
