= Kusumpurer Golpo =

Bangladeshi romantic drama film

- Movie poster
- Bengali: কুসুমপুরের গল্প
- Directed by: Ferdous Wahid
- Story by: Ferdous Wahid
- Produced by: Ferdous Wahid
- Starring: Ferdous Wahid; Mohsin Polash; Jasmin; Moumita
- Music by: Habib Wahid
- Production company: Wahid Films
- Release date: 21 February 2014 (Bangladesh)
- Country: Bangladesh
- Language: Bengali

Kusumpurer Golpo (Bengali: কুসুমপুরের গল্প; transl. The Story of Kusumpur) is a 2014 Bangladeshi romantic drama film. The film was produced and directed by Ferdous Wahid (in his big screen directorial debut). It featured himself, Palash, Jasmine and Moumita in the lead roles. And Shirin Alam, Anis Chowdhury, Kazi Raju and Badol have played supporting roles in the film.

== Plot ==
Conflict started between two brothers of the same family over the share of property. After killing his father, the younger brother, blinded by greed for property, also planned to kill his elder brother. Then the elder brother fled with his family. One day unfortunately his only son Raja (Mohsin Polash) got lost. Raja grows up and finds his father. Then he finds out that his lover Moyna's (Jasmine) father is actually his younger uncle.

== Cast ==
- Ferdous Wahid as Diganta Acharaya
- Mohsin Polash as Raja
- Jasmine as Moyna
- Moumita as Putul
- Kazi Raju
- Badol
- Shirin Alam
- Anis Chowdhury

== Soundtrack ==
The film soundtrack is composed by Habib Wahid.

== Release ==
The film was released on February 21, 2014 in 13 theaters in Bangladesh.
