= SA Haque Alik =

Bangladeshi film director

SA Haque Olike
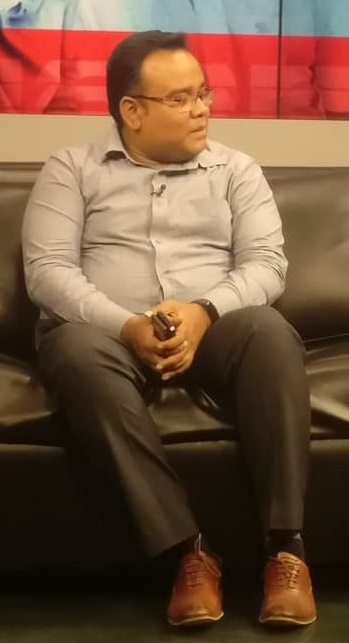
- Born: Bangladesh
- Occupations: Film director screenwriter actor
- Years active: 2007–present
- Notable work: Golui; Aro Bhalobashbo Tomay; Hridoyer Kotha

SA Haque Olike (Bengali: এস এ হক অলিক) is a Bangladeshi film director, screenwriter and Composer. In the late of nineties, he debuted as a director with the drama on the TV screen. Recently released his 5th directed film Golui.

== Career ==
His directorial debut was in 2007 with the film Hridoyer Kotha, which was a romantic drama starring Riaz and Dilara Hanif Purnima. His second directional was also with Ahamed and Purnima in following year in Akash Chhoa Bhalobasa. In 2015 he directed his third venture Aro Bhalobashbo Tomay, starring superstar Shakib Khan and Porimoni, which was first collaboration between Khan and him. For the film Khan earned his second National Award for Best Actor.

== Films ==
#	Year	Title	Role	Cast	Notes
1	2007	Hridoyer Kotha	Director & Screen Writer	Riaz, Purnima	First directorial debut film
2	2008	Akash Chhoa Bhalobasa	Director & Screen Writer	Riaz, Purnima, Razzak	
3	2015	Aro Bhalobashbo Tomay	Director & Screen Writer	Shakib Khan, Pori Moni, Sohel Rana, Champa	
4	2016	Ek Prithibi Prem	Director & Screen Writer	Asif Noor, Airin Sultana	
5	2022	Golui	Director	Shakib Khan, Puja Cherry Roy	

=== Drama ===
#	Year	Title	Role	Cast	Notes
1	–	Bondhu Tumi Bondhu Amar	Director	Apurbo & Tareen Jahan	

=== Acting ===
#	Year	Title	Role	Cast	Notes
1	2005	Kaal Sokale	Actor	Apu Biswas, Shabnur & Ferdous	
