= Farzana Wahid Shayan =

Bangladeshi musician and activist

Farzana Wahid Shayan ফারজানা ওয়াহিদ শায়ান
- Genres: protest song
- Occupations: Singer-songwriter, social activist
- Years active: 2008–present
- Label: Independent

Farzana Wahid Shayan is a Bangladeshi singer-songwriter and social activist. She is known for her protest songs addressing social, political, and human rights issues.

== Early life and career ==
Farzana Wahid Shayan was born to Khasru Wahid. She began learning music in childhood under her mother's guidance. After initially pursuing a career in law, she returned to music and released her debut album in 2008, followed by two more in 2009. Since then, she has primarily released singles focusing on themes of personal experience and socio-political issues. Pop-pioneer Ferdous Wahid was her uncle and pop musician Habib Wahid is her cousin.

In November 2024, Shayan performed a solo concert titled Gaane Gaane Shayan at Bangladesh Shilpakala Academy, returning to live performances after a hiatus.

== Musical style and themes ==
Shayan's music is noted for its emotional depth and lyrics that critique various aspects of society. Her notable songs include Jonotar Beyadobi, Bhoy Banglay Bhoy, Ei Meye Shon, and O Neta Bhai, which address political oppression, social inequality, and the struggles of marginalized communities.

== Activism ==
Shayan is actively involved in social movements. She participated in the July Revolution and Gaza war protests supporting Palestinians, and combating fundamentalism in Bangladesh.

== Notable works ==
=== Albums ===
- Ami Tajjob Bone Jai (2008)

=== Selected Singles ===
- Jonotar Beyadobi
- Bhoy Banglay Bhoy
- Ei Meye Shon
- O Neta Bhai
- Etai Amar Rajniti
- Amar Naam Palestine
- Meye Ra Raat Dokhol Koro
- Ranima
- Ami Tajjob Bone Jai
- Ek Chokhe Churulia, Ek Chokhe Jorasanko, Ek Chokh Buje Theko Na Bangalee – Du'Chokh Diyei Dekho

== Further readings ==
- Ghosh, R. (2024). Adhunikata-Musical or Aural?: The Case of ‘Modern Bengali Song’. Journal of Bangladesh Studies, 26(2), 28-36.
- Tripathi, Salil. "A force for good." Index on Censorship 53, no. 4 (2024): 55-57.
