= Mila Islam =

Bangladeshi singer

Mila Islam মিলা ইসলাম
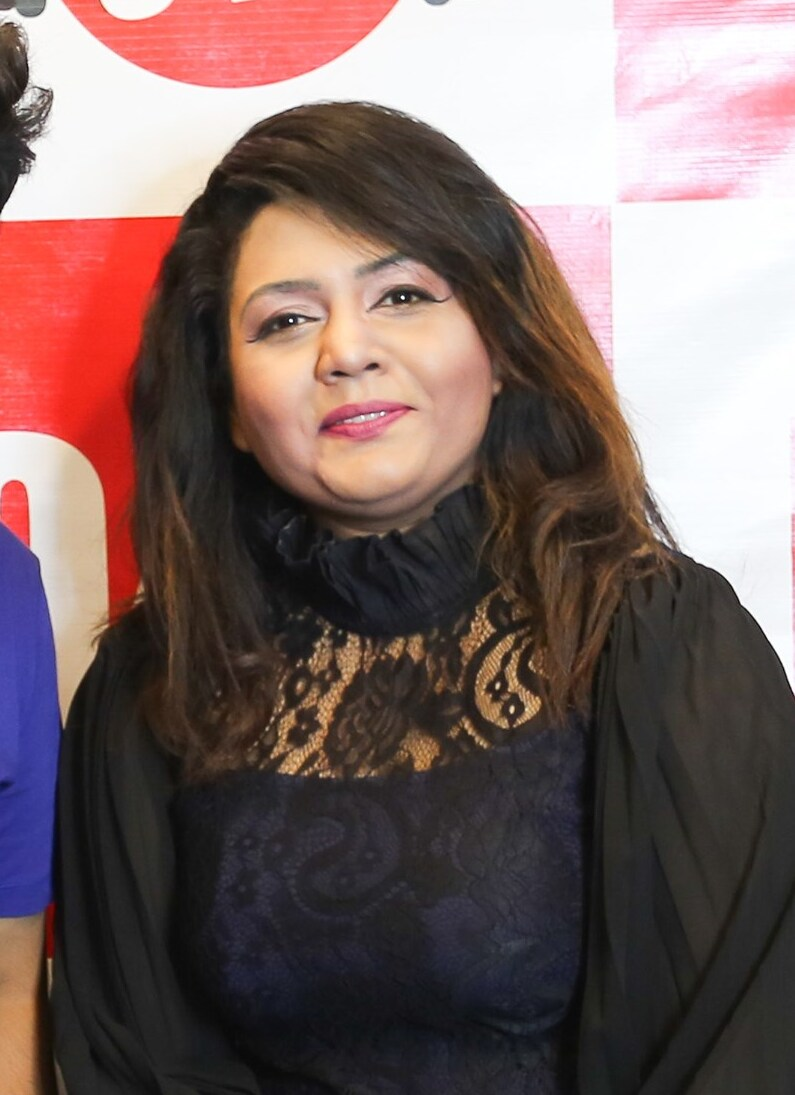
- Mila in 2018

Background information
- Born: Tasbiha Binte Shahid Mila; 26 March 1988 (age 38); Dhaka, Bangladesh
- Origin: Dhaka, Bangladesh
- Genres: Pop; Rock
- Occupations: Singer; Composer
- Instrument: Vocals
- Works: Fele Asha; Chapter 2; Re-defined; Uncensored
- Years active: 2004 - present
- Labels: G-Series, Sangeeta
- Spouse: Parvez Sanjari (divorced)
- Website: www.milaislam.com

Tashbiha Binte Shahid Mila, known as Mila Islam, is a Bangladeshi pop singer.

== Early life ==
Mila's father, Colonel Shahidul Islam was a member of the Bangladesh Army, while her mother, Swapna Islam, was a Nazrul Sangeet artist. Mila's musical training began at the age of three under her mother's guidance. As she grew a little older, she began taking formal training from different classical music ustad (masters). After completing her Secondary School Certificate, she decided to build a career in the music industry.

== Career ==
Despite her classical and Nazrul Sangeet training, Mila pursued Western pop, rock, and hip-hop as her primary genres from the very beginning of her career.

She got her break at 16 with her first debut solo album “Fele Asha”, which was released in 2004, composed by various composers. Mila's second album, Chapter 2, had songs named "Rupbane Nachey Kamor Dolaiya" and "Baburam Shapura", composed by Fuad. Her third album, Re-defined, was released in 2009, also composed by Fuad. This album contained songs such as “Dola De Re” and “Tumi Ki Shara Dibe.” Mila's fourth album Uncensored was released on 1 September 2016.

In addition to her solo career, Mila has worked as a playback singer in the Bangladeshi film industry. Her vocals have featured in soundtracks for commercial films. After a seven-year hiatus from playback singing, Mila made her comeback in 2025 with a song titled "Prem Pukure Borshi Fele Anbore Dhore" for the Bangladeshi film Insaaf.

After a 17-year break, Mila reunited with Fuad to collaborate on a song titled "Kandari Chol," released in dedication to the 2026 FIFA World Cup.

=== Live performances ===
Mila performed at Bangladesh China Friendship Conference Center on 19 November 2008 in Fuad Live, a music event featuring live performances of songs composed, re-arranged and mixed by Fuad.

At the 2011 Cricket World Cup opening ceremony, Mila performed the tournament's official welcome song, "O Prithibi Ebar Ese Bangladesh Nao Chine", alongside fellow artists Ibrar Tipu, Arnob, Balam, Kona, and Elita Karim in the 2011 Cricket World Cup, which was co-hosted by Bangladesh, India, and Sri Lanka.

== Discography ==
- Fele Asha (2004)
- Chapter 2 (2007)
- Re-defined (2009)
- Uncensored (2016)
