= Golui =

- Theatrical release poster
- Bengali: গলুই
- Directed by: SA Haque Alik
- Screenplay by: SA Haque Alik
- Story by: Khorshed Alam Khosru
- Produced by: Khorshed Alam Khosru
- Starring: Shakib Khan; Puja Cherry
- Cinematography: Shamsul Alam Lelin
- Edited by: Mohammad Shahidul Haque
- Music by: Habib Wahid; Imon Saha
- Distributed by: TOT Films (Bangladesh); Bioscope Films (United States)
- Release dates: May 3, 2022 (Bangladesh); July 15, 2022 (United States)
- Running time: 160 minutes
- Country: Bangladesh
- Language: Bengali
- Budget: ৳2.5 crore (US$200,000)
- Box office: ৳6 crore (US$490,000)

Golui (Note: According to Bengali Wiktionary, It is the narrow part of the front of boat) (Bengali: গলুই) is a 2022 Bangladeshi periodical romantic film directed by SA Haque Alik and co-produced by Khorshed Alam Khosru. It has been made on the basis of the traditional boat race of rural Bengal and the life of the people of a vast village. The film stars Shakib Khan, Puja Cherry, Azizul Hakim and Suchorita in the lead roles. The cast also includes Fazlur Rahman Babu, Suchorita, Ali Raj, Jhuna Chowdhury, Somu Chowdhury in supporting roles.

The filming began on September 23, 2021 Mirzapur, Tangail. The film was then released on May 3, 2022 on the occasion of Eid al-Fitr. The film won the National Film Awards twice at the 47th National Film Awards, Khorshed Alam Khosru jointly won Best Story with Faridur Reza Sagor and SA Haque Olike won for Best Dialogue.

== Cast ==
- Shakib Khan as Lalu, a professional dhuli (drummer), also popular as boat racer in his village
- Puja Cherry as Mala, Lalu's love interest
- Ali Raj as Mala's father
- Azizul Hakim as Lalu's father
- Suchorita as Lalu's mother
- Fazlur Rahman Babu
- Jhuna Chowdhury
- Shomu Chowdhury

== Production ==
"The film was named Golui from the boat's golui (Narrow part of the front of the boat). Since the golui is an important part of the boat, the screenplay is made by combining people's life, relationship, family, state with this golui."

— SA Haque Alik about the naming of the film.

The film is made with government grants for the financial year 2020-21, co-produced by Khorshed Alam Khosru, which is directed by SA Haque Alik. According to co-producer, the film is made with a budget ৳2.5 crore, of which ৳60 lakh was a government grant. Filming began on 23 September 2021 at Mohera Zamindar Bari in Mirzapur, Tangail. Shakib Khan for paid-up for film with a remuneration ৳40 lakh, which is confirmed by co-producer Khorshed Alam Khosru. On 25 September 2021, protagonist Shakib Khan rested for 5 days after completing the shooting of Topu Khan's Leader. After that, he participated in the filming of Galui in Jamalpur from September 30. Director SA Haque Alik said about protagonist Shakib Khan character in the film, "Shakib Khan's character name is Lalu. He broke himself and prepared himself as Lalu; He is acting with heart and soul. Hopefully, a different Shakib Khan will appear on screen." It moved to various locations in the Jamuna char area of Jamalpur District, and concluded after 40 days. The film received censor clearance on December 28, 2021 without any objections or cuts.

The official teaser of the film was released on April 5, 2022, which was criticized for poor editing. The official trailer was released on April 26, 2022, which garnering praise from audiences and critics.

== Soundtrack ==
Golui

Soundtrack album by Habib Wahid and Emon Saha
- Released: 2022
- Recorded: 2021
- Studio: TOT Films
- Genre: Feature film soundtrack
- Language: Bengali
- Label: TOT Films
- Producers: Habib Wahid, Emon Saha

Singles from Golui
- 1. "Tui Ami Dui" Released: April 21, 2022

Habib Wahid chronology
Rajneeti (2017)	Golui (2022)

Emon Saha chronology
Tungiparar Miya Bhai (2022)	Golui (2022)	Laal Shari (2023)

The film soundtrack is composed by Habib Wahid and Emon Saha. The background score produced by Emon Saha. Habib Wahid composed the soundtrack after five years with the film who had earlier composed the soundtrack for protagonist Shakib Khan's 2017 film Rajneeti. He composed film's title track "Golui" (Amar Bhalobasha), with lyrics penned by Sohel Arman, which was recorded in September 2021 at his own studio in Green Road, Dhaka sung by himself with Zarin. The film's first single "Jombe Mela" was revealed on April 9, 2022, composed by Habib Wahid and sung by himself featuring Zarin in her debut which was penned by SA Haque Alik, who gave Wahid his first playback superhit by singing in his film Hridoyer Kotha in 2006. Its second track "Tui Ami Dui" composed Emon Saha with lyrics penned by SA Haque Alik was revealed on April 21, 2022, which sung by SI Tutu.

Track listing
No.	Title	Music	Singer(s)	Length
1.	"Amar Bhalobasha"	Habib Wahid	Habib Wahid, Zarin	4:35
2.	"Aye Bristi Jhepe"	Imran Mahmudul	Imran Mahmudul, Dilshad Nahar Kona	2:37
3.	"Jombe Mela"	Habib Wahid	Habib Wahid, Mimi	4:40
4.	"Tui Amar Dui"	Emon Saha	S.I. Tutul	4:16

== Release ==
The film was released on May 3, 2022 in 28 cinemas around the country on the occasion of Eid al-Fitr.

The film was released in the United States on July 15, 2022. A total of 28 shows were screened in four sets till 21 July, which distributed by Bioscope Films.

The film was revealed on video streaming service Biocope on December 9, 2022 under the distribution of Zahid Hasan Abhi.

== Ban on screening ==
After its release on 3 May, it was screened at the local Shilpa Kalar Academy as there were no cinema halls in Jamalpur. The Deputy Commissioner of Jamalpur, Mursheda Zaman, ban on the screening of Golui, stating that "no commercial film will be screened".

After the announcement of the ban on the screening, there was a storm of criticism and protests on social media, later the ban was withdraw on May 10.

== Reception ==
The film received mixed reviews from critics, despite did not perform well at the box office. Ahsan Kabir on bdnews24 praised the film's soundtrack and DOP. However, he noted that its screenplay was weak. According to the co-producer Khorshed Alam Khosru, the film grossed ৳6 crore (US$490,000) at the box office in two months of its release and the producers share was ৳1.9 crore (US$150,000).

=== Awards and nominations ===
Date of ceremony	Award	category	Recipient(s) and nominee(s)	Result	Ref.
2 February 2023	BCRA Awards 2022	Best Actress	Puja Cherry	Won	
14 November 2023	47th National Film Award	Best Story	Khorshed Alam Khosru	Won	
14 November 2023	47th National Film Award	Best Dialogue	SA Haque Alik	Won	
11 May 2024	BFDA Awards 2022-23	Best Film Choreographer	Habibur Rahman	Won	
23 September 2023	24th Meril-Prothom Alo Awards	Best Film Actor	Shakib Khan	Nominated	
23 September 2023	24th Meril-Prothom Alo Awards	Best Film Actress	Puja Cherry	Nominated	
