= Eito Prem =

- Theatrical poster
- Directed by: Shohel Arman
- Written by: Shohel Arman
- Produced by: Shaheen Kabir
- Starring: Shakib Khan; Bindu; Amit Hasan; Shahiduzzaman Selim
- Music by: Habib Wahid
- Release date: 13 March 2015
- Country: Bangladesh
- Language: Bengali

Eito Prem (Bengali: এইতো প্রেম; English: This Is Love) is a 2015 Bangladeshi romance feature film written by Shohel Arman and also directed by Shohel Arman. The film stars Shakib Khan and Bindu as the lead pair of the film along with the Ramendu Majumdar, Shahiduzzaman Selim, Afroza Banu, Amit Hasan and Syed Hasan Imam. The film's score and soundtrack were composed by Habib Wahid.

== Plot ==
Eito Prem is a love story set during the 1971 Liberation War of Bangladesh.

== Cast ==
- Shakib Khan as Surjo
- Bindu as Madhabi
- Shahiduzzaman Selim
- Ramendu Majumdar
- Afroza Banu
- Syed Hasan Imam
- Amit Hasan
- Nipun
- Masum Aziz
- Siraj Haider
- Pran Ray
- Riaz Mahmud as Robin

== Soundtrack ==
Eito Prem

Soundtrack album by Habib Wahid
- Released: 2009
- Genre: Film soundtrack
- Label: Sangeeta

The film score of the film as well as the soundtrack was scored by Habib Wahid. The soundtrack, featuring 7 tracks overall, has lyrics by Shohel Arman.

The soundtrack was released in 2009. The album was both critically acclaimed and gained popularity upon its release.

=== Track listing ===
No.	Title	Artist(s)	Length
1.	"Moner Vitor"	Habib Wahid & Nazmun Munira Nancy
2.	"Jotsna Debo"	Nazmun Munira Nancy
3.	"Jak Na Ure"	Milon Mahmud
4.	"Modhuboner Phool"	Doli Shyantor
5.	"Hridoye Amar Bangladesh"	Habib Wahid, Arfin Rumey, Predeep Kumar
6.	"Hridoye Amar Bangladesh(slow)"	Habib Wahid, Arfin Rumey, Predeep Kumar
7.	"Moner Bhetor(slow)"	Habib Wahid & Nancy
