= Topu =

Bangladeshi singer-songwriter and composer

Topu তপু
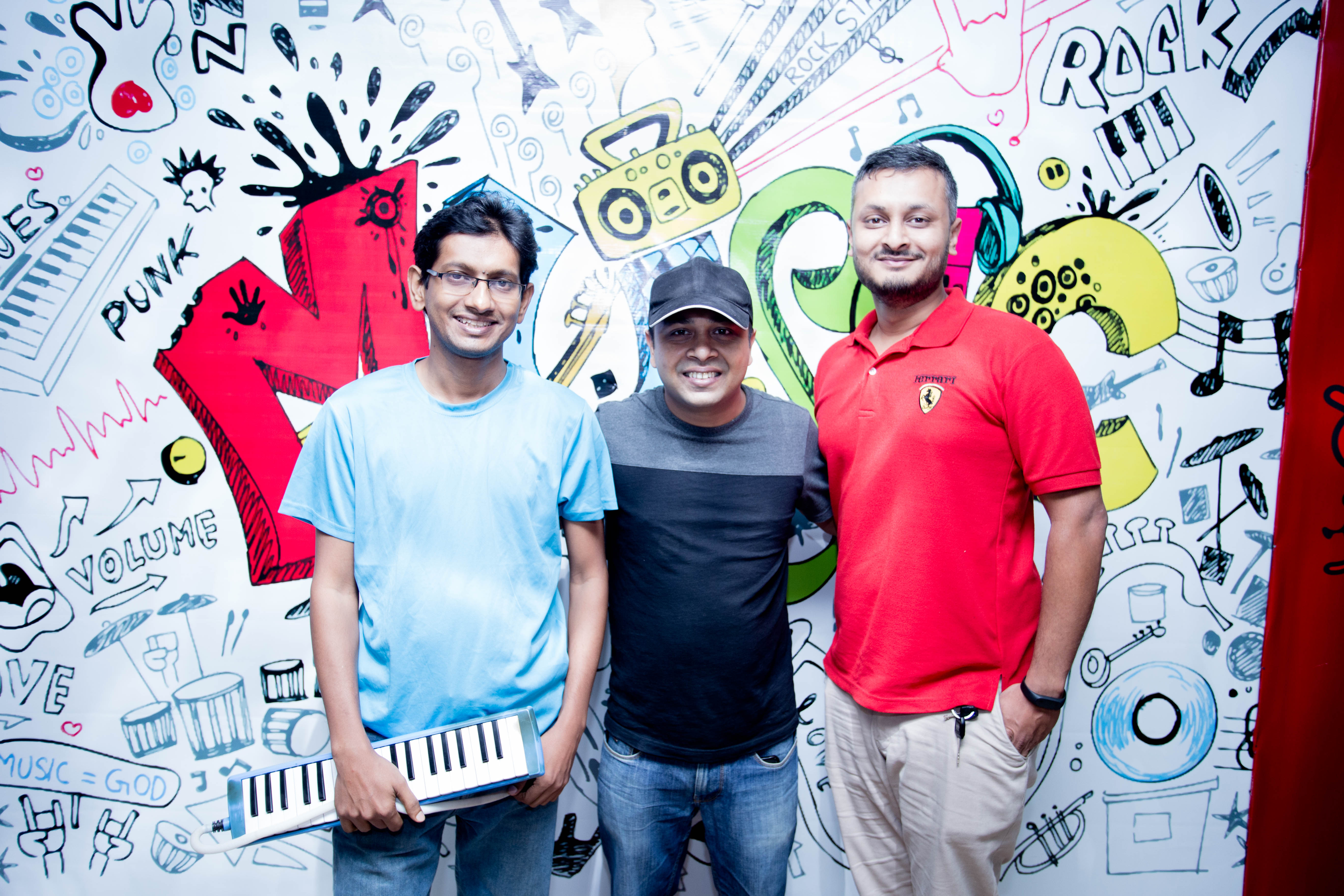
- Topu (middle)

Background information
- Born: Rashed Uddin Ahmed Topu; 2 June 1982 (age 44)
- Genres: Pop; Acoustic
- Occupations: Musician; singer-songwriter; composer
- Instruments: Vocals, guitar
- Years active: 2004–present
- Label: G-Series
- Member of: Yaatri
- Website: facebook.com/TopuOfficial

Rashed Uddin Ahmed Topu (born 2 June 1982) popularly known as Topu is a Bangladeshi musician, singer-songwriter and composer as well as the lead vocalist of Yaatri. In 2004, Topu formed the band "Yaatri" and began his career with a compilation album Shopnochura released in 2004. He rose to fame with the release of the single "Ek Paye Nupur". and signed with G-Series and released the first band album Daak in 2006. He released his first solo studio album Bondhu Bhabo Ki in 2008, followed by the huge popularity, he released four solo studio albums, Shey Ke? (2010), Aar Tomake (2013), and Dekha Hobe Boley (2015).

== Life and career ==
=== 1982–2004: Early life ===
Topu was born on 2 June 1982. His father, Shamshuddin Ahmed, was an officer in the Bangladesh Army who rose to the rank of lieutenant colonel. The family moved around a lot because of his job. A formative part of Topu's childhood was spent amidst the hills and trees at Comilla Cantonment. He attended Ispahani Public School in Chittagong up to class six. In 1994, he entered Barisal Cadet College where he completed his Secondary School Certificate (SSC) in 1998 and then his Higher Secondary School Certificate (HSC). He holds a bachelor's degree in computer science from North South University and an MBA from the same university.

Topu's enthusiasm to music began at an early age. He discovered his love for music back in high school when he started to compose and sing on his guitar. He was literally inspired to write from his surroundings. His aptitude to music grew more when his father gave an acoustic guitar as gift for his glorious result in SSC examination. He started his musical life in college, composing and writing lyrics and gave his first stage performance at Barisal Cadet College.

=== 2005–07: Career beginnings ===
While studying in North South University in 2003, Topu became a member of North South University Shangskritik Shangothon (NSUSS), one of the biggest clubs promoting culture and music in the university. In 2004, Topu and Emran met at the NSUSS, started jamming together and formed the band "Yaatri". The first line up of their band was Bipu (guitars), Mitu (bass), Emran (keys) and Topu (vocals). It was then when Tony, drummer of Black collaborated with them for their first single "Ek Paye Nupur" which was released in the compilation album Shopnochura at the end of 2004.

Yaatri was not officially formed until 2005 when Tony asked for another song in his sequel album Shopnochura II. After that they composed another single titled "Ekta Gopon Kotha" which was one of the highlights of that album, and this fame and recognition brought Khaled, owner of G-Series to offer them a record deal in November 2005. For the next eight months, both Topu and Emran worked with Buno in his studio Dhun, who mixed and mastered the album. Collaborating with other guitarists, bassists and drummers, Yaatri finished their debut album Daak in October 2006 which consists of ten compositions. It was released on 19 October on the occasion of Eid-ul-fitr. The album featuring songs Ei Ki Beshi Na, Bhalobasha Shunechi Ja, Ojana Mone, Ke Daake, Miththey Prem was a hit.

== Personal life ==
Topu married Naziba Selim on 24 August 2012 in Dhaka. They have a daughter, Tori, born in 2019.

== Discography ==
Band albums

- 2006: Daak

Solo Studio albums

- 2008: Bondhu Bhabo Ki?
- 2010: She Ke?
- 2013: Aar Tomake
- 2015: Dekha Hobe Boley

Compilation album

- 2004: Shopnochura – (track – Ek paye Nupur)
- 2005: Shopnochura II – (track – Ekta Gopon Kotha)
- 2006: Underground – (track – Jonmechi Tai)
- 2007: Underground 2 – (track – Chetona)
- 2007: Shopnochura III – (track – Jonmechi Tai)
- 2008: Bondhuta – (track – Manush Matro Bhul)
- 2008: The Hit Album – (track – Mon Bhalo Nei)
- 2008: Rock 101 – (track – Bodle Jai)
- 2009: Rock 202 – (track – Keu Na Keui)
- 2010: The Hit Album III – (track – Ei Shono)
- 2012: Studio 58 & Singers – (track -Songopone)
- 2012: Oporajita – (track -Bhubondangar Hashi)
- 2012: Letters From Siliguri 2 – (track -Toke Vabi Ami aka Dekhechi Toke)
- 2012: Hatiar – (track -Na)
- 2013: Nimontron – (track -Nimontron)
- 2013: The Hit Album IV – (track – Joldighi)
- 2014: Shopnochura IV – (track -Ora Bodle Geche )
- 2014: Keya Patar Nouko – (track -Bhalo Achi, Keya Pata )

Film Soundtrack Album

- 2009: Third Person Singular Number

== Filmography ==
=== Film ===
Year	Title	Role	Notes
2009	Third Person Singular Number	Himself	Film debut

=== Music videos ===
Title	Other performer(s)	Director(s)	Album
Nupur 2	Anila Naz Chowdhury	Nazim & Taposh	Bondhu Bhabo Ki
Meye		Farmhouse	Bondhu Bhabo Ki
Ekta Gopon Kotha		Shamimul Hoque	Swapnochura II
Jonmodin		Nazmus Shadat Nazim	She ke?
She Ke		Nazmus Shadat Nazim	She Ke?
Tumi Chole Jao		Nazmus Shadat Nazim	She ke?
Bhalobashi		Nazmus Shadat Nazim	She ke?
Ami Ke	Anila Naz Chowdhury	Nazmus Shadat Nazim	She ke?
Mon Valo Nei		Mamunur Rashid Khan	The Hit Album
Mitthe Prem		Rommo Khan	Daak
Ei Shono		Iqbal Ahmed (ColdFire Productions UK)	The Hit Album 3
Bhuban Dangar Hashi	Nancy	Tawhidur Rahman Rubel	Oporajita
Nimontron	Nancy	Rommo Khan	Nimontron
Ar Tomake		Rommo Khan	Ar Tomake
Evabe Na		Single Light Production	Ar Tomake

== Other works ==
Book

- 2010: Ekta Gopon Kotha

Topu made his debut as a writer with the book "Ekti Gopon Kotha" which was published in 2010 under Ajob Productions at the Ekushey Book Fair. The book contains lyrics of 36 of his songs. They are mostly romantic songs and all the lyrics are written by him.

As host

- 2010: Monbondhur Moner Deshe – (TV Program; aired on 15 September 2010)
- 2010: Monbondhur Moner Deshe – (TV Program; aired in November 2010)
- 2012: Amar Guitar Amar Gaan – (TV Program; aired on 11 March 2012)

== Awards and nominations ==
=== Meril Prothom Alo Awards ===
Year	Nominee / work	Award	Result
2010	Third Person Singular Number	Best Film Actor (Critics Choice )	Won

== See also ==
- Anila
- Fuad Al Muktadir
