= Aro Bhalobashbo Tomay =

Bangladeshi romantic drama film

- Theatrical release poster
- Directed by: SA Haque Alik
- Written by: SA Haque Alik
- Produced by: Khorshed Alam Khosru
- Starring: Shakib Khan; Pori Moni; Sohel Rana; Champa; Sadek Bachchu; Afzal Sharif
- Music by: Emon Saha Habib Wahid Hridoy Khan
- Production company: TOT Films
- Distributed by: Tanjib Films
- Release date: 14 August 2015
- Country: Bangladesh
- Language: Bengali

Aro Bhalobashbo Tomay (Bengali: আরও ভালবাসবো তোমায়; transl. I Will Love You More) is a Bangladeshi romantic-drama film. The film written and directed by SA Haque Alik. It feature Shakib Khan and Porimoni in the lead roles with Sohel Rana, Champa, Sadek Bachchu and Afzal Sharif played supporting roles in the film. The film soundtrack composed by Habib Wahid, Hridoy Khan and Emon Saha.

The film's principal photography began on 15 February 2015, and official trailer was revealed on YouTube on 2 August 2015. The film was released on 14 August 2015. It received positive reviews from critics, and considering its budget the film had commercial success at the box office. Shakib Khan won the National Film Award for Best Actor for the third time at the 43rd National Film Awards for his performance in the film.

== Plot ==
Actor Shakib Khan fell in love with a simple village girl named Nolok (Pori Moni) through the mobile phone. Few days later they became familiar with each other. Shakib Khan took Sohel Rana as his guardian and took the marriage proposal to Nolak's home. Nolok's father turned down the marriage proposal because he had a negative perception of people in the entertainment world. This marked the beginning of extreme conflict of suffering between the love of two ignorant minds.

== Cast ==
- Shakib Khan as Shakib Khan (himself), A film actor and media personality; later he fell in love with a girl named Nolok and committed suicide for her
- Pori Moni as Nolok, A simple village girl from an ordinary family; she fell in love with Shakib Khan and later committed suicide when her father did not accept their relationship
- Sohel Rana
- Champa
- Sadek Bachchu
- Afzal Sharif as Belayet, Shakib Khan's assistant-turned-friend
- Bobby Haque as Herself (Guest Appearance)

== Production ==
The film's Muharat was held on 10 February 2015, at the VIP projection hall of BFDC's Zahir Raihan Color Lab. The then Information Minister of Bangladesh Hasanul Haq Inu was present as the chief guest on the occasion. State Minister for Textiles and Jute Mirza Azam, film's actor Shakib Khan, Pori Moni, Champa and many others were also present.

=== Casting ===
Shakib Khan and Pori Moni were signed a contract to play the lead roles of Shakib Khan and Nolok in the film. It is Pori Moni's second contracted film opposite Shakib Khan and the first to be released. She had earlier signed a contract opposite Shakib Khan for the film Dhumketu in 2014, subsequently the film was released in 2016. Although Apu Biswas was supposed to play a special guest appearance in the film, but she did not act in the end, she was later replaced actress Bobby Haque.

=== Filming ===
The principal photography of the film began on 15 February 2015 on the 3rd floor of BFDC. The film's entire unit, including the lead actors, were present on the first day of filming. The film's first lot was filming for 6 consecutive days from 17 to 23 February 2015. Then the entire unit of the film went to Rangamati on 24 February 2015. After completing the work there, the entire unit went to Bandarban on 27 February 2015. The film's work of the second lot was completed there till 4 March 2015, including the filming of two songs. Then the entire crews of the film went to Sylhet on 17 April 2015. The third lot of the film was completed there from 17 to 25 April 2015 with a few songs filming.

== Soundtrack ==
Aro Bhalobashbo Tomay

Soundtrack album by Habib Wahid, Hridoy Khan and Emon Saha
- Released: 15 August 2015
- Recorded: February, 2015
- Studio: TOT Films
- Genre: Feature Film Soundtrack
- Length: 22:33
- Language: Bangla
- Label: TOT Films
- Producer: Habib Wahid

Singles from Aro Bhalobashbo Tomay
- 1. "Moner Duar (মনের দুয়ার)" Released: 7 July 2015; 2. "Tumi Amar Boshundhara (তুমি আমার বসুন্ধরা)" Released: 8 September 2015

The film's soundtrack album is composed and arranged by Habib Wahid, Hridoy Khan and Emon Saha. All the songs of the film have also been written by its director SA Haque Alik. A total of five songs have been used in the film. The film's first song titled "Moner Duar" was released on YouTube on 7 July 2015, as a promotional singles under the banner of TOT Films. The song is sung by Habib Wahid and Sabrina Porshi and composed and music arranged by Habib Wahid himself. After the film release, its second song as a singles titled "Tumi Amar Boshundhara" was released on YouTube on 6 September 2015. The song sung Hridoy Khan and Sabrina Porshi.

Track listing
| No. | Title | Music | Artist(s) | Length |
|---|---|---|---|---|
| 1. | "Moner Duar (মনের দুয়ার)" | Habib Wahid | Habib Wahid, Sabrina Porshi | 3:59 |
| 2. | "Tumi Amar Bashundhara (তুমি আমার বসুন্ধরা)" | | Hridoy Khan, Sabrina Porshi | 3:46 |
| 3. | "Keno Eto (কেনো এত)" | | S I Tutul, Konal | 4:58 |
| 4. | "Antorer Moyna (অন্তরের ময়না)" | | Imran Mahmudul, Lemis | 4:17 |
| 5. | "Ki Emon Kotha (কি এমন কথা)" | | Kishore | 5:33 |
| Total length: | | | | 22:33 |

== Promotion and release ==
The film was cleared by the Bangladesh Film Censor Board without any cuts on 7 July 2015. Earlier, on 30 June 2015, the film was submitted to the Censor Board for clearance. The official trailer and theatrical release trailer of the film was released on 2 August 2015. Subsequently, after the film's release, its second trailer was revealed on 18 August 2015, and the third trailer was revealed on 20 August 2015. All the trailers were revealed on Girona Bangladesh Movies YouTube channel.

=== Release ===
The film was released in 90 theaters across Bangladesh on 14 August 2015.

== Reception ==
In a review in Prothom Alo, film director and critics Motin Rahman called the film a "healthy tolerable presentation". He writes, "Shakib Khan's makeup in the separation scene could have brought more depressing makeup. The photographer could have taken the scene of the last telephone conversation between Pori Moni and Shakib Khan from a more realistic and psychological point of view. Despite having lots of shots and scenes, the film has been hampered by cinematic mood, momentum or dialectical conflict due to lack of editing types. He praised Pori Moni's performance in the film and said that, "Pori Moni's performance is amazing! The director could have brought out the acting of Shakib Khan. Film's protagonist and a lover—there is a kind of subtle transformation between these two characters. "Aro Bhalobashbo Tomay" is a healthy tolerable presentation from two or four other films stuffed with materials to destroy our society and culture.

=== Awards and nominations ===
Shakib Khan portrayed as himself in film and won the National Film Award for Best Actor for the third time in his career.

| Award | Date of ceremony | category | Recipient(s) and nominee(s) | Result | Ref. |
|---|---|---|---|---|---|
| National Film Awards | 24 July 2017 | Best Actor | Shakib Khan | Won | |
