= Shono (album) =

Studio album by Habib Wahid
- Released: November 9, 2006
- Genre: World; Pop; Hip Hop; R&B; EDM
- Length: 42:00
- Language: Bengali
- Label: Laser Vision
- Producer: Habib Wahid

Habib Wahid chronology
Moina Go (2005)	Shono (2006)	Panjabiwala (2007)

Shono (Bengali: শোন; lit. Listen) is a Bengali-language pop album by Habib Wahid released on November 9, 2006. It is Habib Wahid's first solo album, and fourth studio album overall. The album has 9 tracks in total, which were all composed and produced by Habib Wahid. Habib also served as the main vocalist for album, singing every song except for "Calenderer Pata", which is sung by his father Ferdous Wahid. The album features a wide range of genres such as world, pop, EDM, and more.

== Release ==
The album was originally released on January 1, 2006, through CDs. The album was later released on digital stores and for digital streaming on different platforms like iTunes, Apple Music and GP Music.

== Reception ==
Like Habib Wahid's other albums, Shono gained immense popularity among audiences.

== Track listing ==
No.	Title	Length
1.	"Shopner Cheyeo Modhur"	3:54
2.	"Jadu"	5:35
3.	"Mon Munia"	5:47
4.	"Elomelo Mon"	4:10
5.	"Projapoti"	4:36
6.	"Ei Shomoye"	4:48
7.	"Calenderer Pata" (performed by Ferdous Wahid)	4:40
8.	"Poran Pakhi"	4:50
9.	"Ekhoni Nambe Brishti"	4:00
Total length:		42:00
