= Yaatri =

Bangladeshi pop band

Yaatri ইয়াত্রী
- Origin: Dhaka, Bangladesh
- Genres: mello rock
- Years active: 2004–present
- Members: Rashed Uddin Ahmed Topu; Shams Alim Biswas
- Past members: Tony Vincent Gomes; Bipu; Mitu; Emran Khan

Yaatri is a Bangladeshi pop music band. They have been described as a mello rock band.

== History ==
Yaatri was formed by Topu, and Emran while they were students at North South University in 2004. Topu also pursued a solo career. They played in the 2007 Desh Music Festival.

Yaatri launched their first album in 2006 titled Daak. Their first album was pop music. The Daily Star said Daak had taken "Bangla pop music scene by storm". The music was described having relatable lyrics and simple melodies.

== Band members ==
=== Current members ===
- Rashed Uddin Ahmed Topu - vocals (2004–present)
- Shams Alim Biswas – bass guitar

=== Past members ===
- Tony Vincent Gomes - drums
- Bipu - lead guitar (2004-)
- Mitu - bass (2004-)
- Emran Khan - keyboard (2004-)
