= Suzana Zafar =

Bangladeshi actress and model

- সুজানা জাফর
- Born: Sumaiya Zafar Suzana
- Occupations: Model, actress
- Years active: 2001–2019
- Spouses: Faisal Ahmed (m. 2006); Hridoy Khan (m. 2014; div. 2015); Syed Haque (m. 2024)

Sumayia Zafar Suzana, known as Suzana Zafar, is a retired Bangladeshi television actress and model.

== Career ==
Zafar started working as a model in 2001. She has done several television commercials and in 2003 she won the Lux Photogenic Beauty Contest Award. She acted with singer Shafin Ahmed in the six episode drama Rhyme of Life, and has appeared in some Eid al-Fitr dramas including Onukoron and Patrider Janano Jachchhey Je.

Zafar was a model in the music video "Keu Na januk", a song by Tahsan Rahman Khan and composed by Imran, and appeared in other music videos including Tumi Ashba Naki and Ami Chuye Dilei. She also appeared in two music videos, Bhalo Lage Na and Arale, with her ex-husband, the singer Hridoy Khan.

== Personal life ==
Zafar first married Faisal Ahmed, an employee at a buying house in Dhaka, in 2006. She then married musician Hridoy Khan in August 2014 and divorced him in 2015. In October 2024, on an Instagram post, she announced her third marriage to Syed Haque, a businessman in Dubai.
