= Krishno =

Studio album by Habib Wahid
- Released: 2003
- Genre: Folk
- Label: Ektaar

Habib Wahid chronology
Krishno (2003)	Maya (2004)

Krishno (Bengali: কৃষ্ণ) is the debut album of Bangladeshi music producer, Habib Wahid released in 2003 under the Ektaar record label. The album consists of folk songs sung by Kaya.

== Track listing ==
All lyrics are written by Arkum Shah, Shah Abdul Karim.

No.	Title	Lyrics	Length
1.	"Krishno"	Arkum Shah	5:24
2.	"Doyal Baba"	Nazrul Khan	4:54
3.	"Ami Kul Hara"		5:52
4.	"Kemone Bhulibo Ami"
5.	"Gaan Gai Amar"
6.	"Kala"
7.	"Aaj Pasha"
8.	"Din Gelo Din"
9.	"Krishno (Remix)"	Arkum Shah
10.	"Aaj Pasha (Instrumental)"

== Sales ==
Region	Certification	Certified units/sales
Bangladesh	—	300,000
