= Shireen Jawad =

Bangladeshi British singer (born 1971)

Shireen Jawad শিরিন জাওয়াদ
- Born: 10 August 1971 (age 55); East London, England
- Origin: London, England
- Genres: Bengali; folk music; dance music
- Occupation: Singer
- Instrument: Vocals
- Years active: 2007–present
- Label: Laser Vision

Shireen Jawad (Bengali: শিরিন জাওয়াদ; born 10 August 1971) is a Bangladeshi British singer.

== Early life ==
Jawad was born and brought up in East London, England. Her first memories are of singing on her father's lap at the age of two She began singing Bollywood songs from an early age as a hobby. She was encouraged by her father to learn music. Her first performances were at school. Her inspiration came from her late mother and father who used to play traditional Bangla folk music at home.

== Career ==
Jawad qualified as a social worker before becoming a professional singer. At the age of 19, she had her first public performance and moved on to singing Bengali folk songs to larger audiences. She has performed at community functions and fairs across the UK, winning prizes at the 2002 Bethnal Green Festival and at the Asianet Talent Competition.

In 2007, Jawad's debut album Panjabiwala was released, co-recorded with Habib Wahid the album features a collection of songs given to Jawad by her late mother. In 2009, her second album Mathwali was released by Laser Vision, which features a selection of songs Jawad collated from all regions of Bangladesh. In April 2013, her third album Rangeela was released by Laser Vision, featuring Habib Wahid, Bappa Mazumder, Fuad al Muqtadir, Hridoy Khan, Rumel, Rumman, Rafa and Raihan. Jawad has also worked with producers Habib Wahid and Fuad Almuktader.

Jawad regularly performs in UK, Bangladesh and the US as well as Denmark, Italy and Spain. In August 2015, she performed at the Barclaycard Arena in Birmingham.

Jawad's main focus is traditional Asian folk and spiritual music.

== Discography ==
=== Singles ===
Year	Single	Chart positions	Album
2012	"Dil Haara"		Mathwali
2014	"What's Better Than Love"		

=== Albums ===
Title	Album details	Chart positions	Certifications
Panjabiwala	Released: 2007; Formats: CD		
Mathwali	Released: 2009; Label: Laser Vision; Formats: CD, Digital Download; Co-recorded with Habib Wahid		
Rangeela	Released: 9 April 2013; Label: Laser Vision; Formats: CD, Digital Download		
Gaanwali	Released: Jan 11 2017; Label: CD Choice; Formats: CD, Digital Download; Co-recorded with Avraal Sahir		

== See also ==
- British Bangladeshi
- List of British Bangladeshis
