= Fuad al Muqtadir =

Bangladeshi composer (born 1988)

Fuad Al Muqtadir ফুয়াদ আলমুক্তাদির
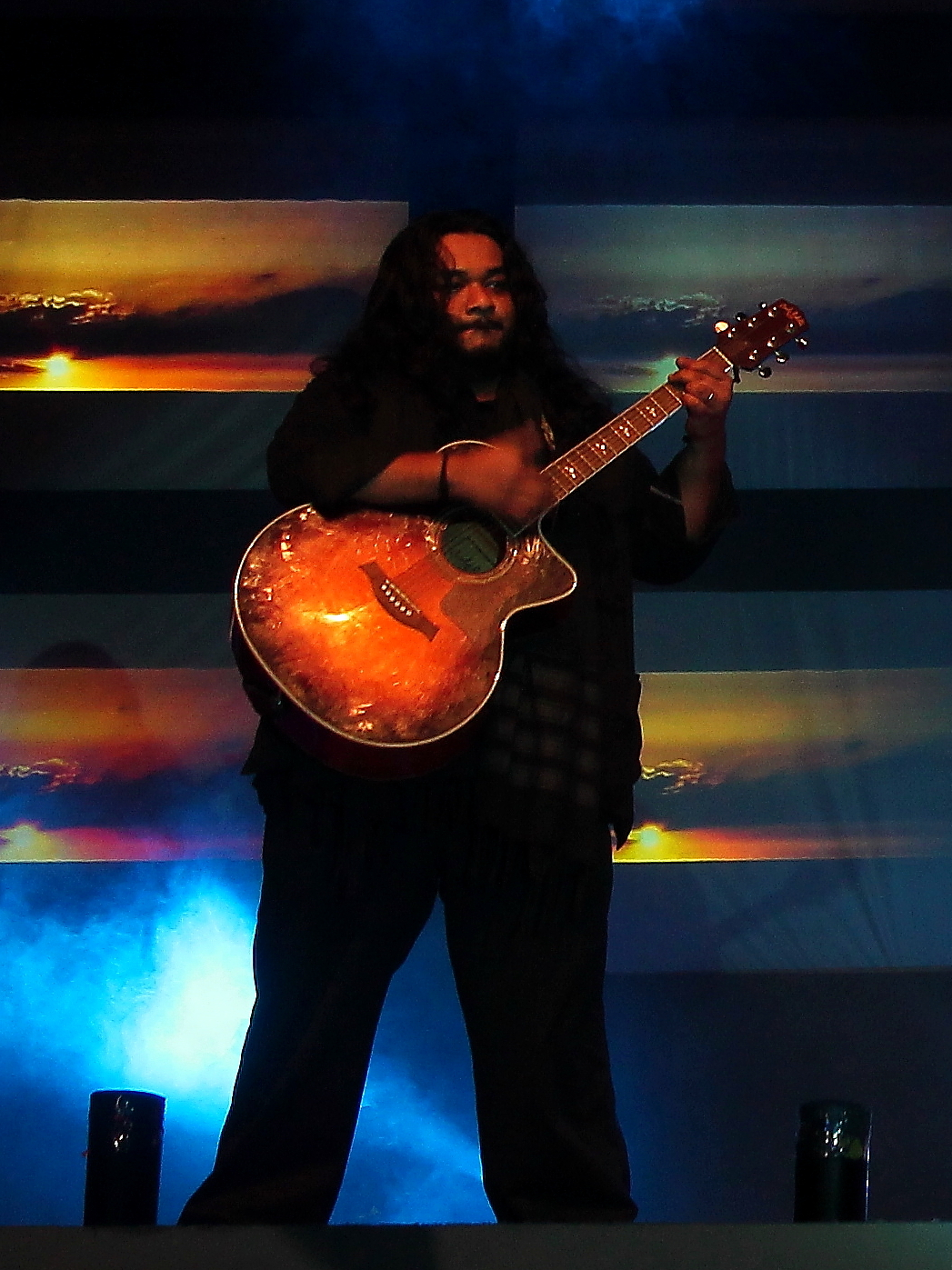
- Muqtadir in 2012

Background information
- Genres: Electronica, hip hop, rock, R&B
- Occupations: Producer, singer, composer, music director
- Instruments: Keyboards, vocals, guitar, drums
- Years active: 2000–present
- Label: OK BRO Record
- Website: fuadmusic.com

Fuad Almuqtadir, popularly known as Fuad, is a Bangladeshi American composer and arranger.

== Early life ==
Fuad was born on 6 August 1980 in Chittagong and left Bangladesh to New York City with his family in 1988. He grew up with the non-resident Bangladeshi community of New York City where he learned about Bangladeshi culture and music.

== Career ==
Fuad's first full-length album was the self-released Maya in 1998. His next album, Re/Evolution, was released by Aarshi Records in 2003. Variation #25 came in 2005. The album was released to the general public at the end of Nestle’s campaign, where it sold another 2 million copies. 2006 saw FM radio coming to Bangladesh, and Fuad’s music was played in heavy rotation by Radio Foorti. He released Bonno in 2007. From 2015-2017, Fuad was the music director for Radio Foorti.

Fuad composed the official theme song of the 2014 ICC World Twenty20, titled “Char Chokka Hoi Hoi”. In 2023, he composed the song “Dewana” for Coke Studio Bangla Season 2.

== Personal life ==
Fuad comes from a family engaged in the health care business in New York City, United States. He married Maya in 2011. The couple has one daughter, Azalea, born on February 4, 2016. In 2018, Fuad was diagnosed with thyroid cancer and recovered in 2019.

== Discography ==
Fuad discography
Album/type	Featured artists	Duration	Songs	Year	Publisher
Maya (not only but also)	Unknown	(14 songs)	Breath in Train; Purnima Raate; Maya; Ghono Kuashay; Shah; Jibon; Ei Mon; Prem; Protidin; Buker Jala; Ghorir Kata; Bondhu Baul; Ei Hridoy; Jodi	1998	Hollywood Music World
Re/Evolution	Kaniz, Oni, Anila, Labony, Armeen, Rajeeb, Rusho, Kazi, Max, Judgement, Zion	1 hour 1 minutes and 36 seconds (13 songs)	Asha; Banglar Gaan Gai; Besto Shohore; Bhromor Koiyo; Chiki Chiki; Ei Poth; Ei Mon; Jhilmil Jhilmil; Mane Na Mon; Mane Chaile Mon; Nikosh Adhar; Youth Man; Don't Cross the Border	2003	Agniveena and Arshee Music
Variation No. 25.2	Kaniz, B1shop, Rajeeb, Poonam, Anila, Shanto, Bappa, Tony, Upol, Labony, Rahat	1 hour 12 minutes and 28 seconds (15 songs)	Shona Bondhu; Oshoni Shonket; Nobeena; Daak Diyachhen; Nitol Paye; Abar Shurute; Ei; Meye; Kono Ashroy; Bhashailire; Tomake Bhebe Lekha; Gonga; Mukto Hawa; Syloti; Bidrohi	2006	Agniveena
Stoic Bliss' (Light Years Ahead)	Stoic Bliss, Rajeeb	(13 songs)	Intro; Abar Jigay; Party at Pianohouse; Chow Mei Fun; Prem Mrittur Por; Mayabi Chokh; Sheshbarer Moto; Badman Returns; Bangladesh; The Epitome; Roktim Shinghashon; Deceptive Measures; Ato Raag; Bloopers	2006	G-Series
Fuad feat. Mila (Chapter 2)	Mila, Skibkhan	51 minutes 45 seconds (12 songs)	Intro; Bapuram Shapure; Megher Dosh; Jatrabala; Shukno Patar Nupur; Shrabon; Chaader Buri; Chupi Chupi; Obhiman; Sholoana Mon; Shukno Pata (Remix); Chhera Paal (Acoustic)	2007	G-Series
Stoic Bliss' (Kolponar Baire)	Stoic Bliss	45 minutes 57 seconds (13 songs)	Intro; Abar Abar Jigay; Pakhi Paka Pepe Khay; Ac1d Ke?; Raatri Jaga; Pura Ura Dhura; Shomoyer Palki; Berajaal; Ei Je Ami; Amar Bondhu Bonduk; Sample This; Shapura; Fire Like a Dragon	2007	G-Series
Bonno	Mila, Anila, Elita, Simin, B1shop, Kazi, Shanto, Johan, Rule, Upol, Avalanche, Rahat, Arbovirus, Labony, Shunno, Lamia, Shihab, Poonam	1 Hour 19 minutes (18 songs)	Intro; Junglee; Khub Chena Chena; Da Dushto Number; Bonno Rap; Shukno Pata; Hit Film; Jokhoni Nibir Kore; Ke Bashi Bajay Re; Nitol Paye (Live); Prottasha; Protibader Kotha; Tor Jonno Bonno; Tumi Hina; Danger; Matir Pinjira; Prayoshchitto; Shujro Ghor Bari	2007	G-Series
Fuad feat. Sumon & Anila (Ekhon Ami...)	Sumon and Anila	53 minutes and 16 seconds (11 songs)	Gaibona; Ekhon Ami; Shopnogulo Tomar Moto; Shobar Jonno Tumi; Tirjok; Tomar Jonno; Ghum Pariye Dio; Jokhon Charidike; Onneshon; Noshtoneer; Shobar Jonno Tumi (?)	2007	G-Series
Fuad feat. Various Artists (Kromannoy)	Mila, Rafa, Upol, Kona, Shuvo	48 minutes and 53 seconds (11 songs)	Klantir Shohore; Ognipurush; Akash; Shob Loke Koy; Pichhuhata; Janina; Jibon Gelo; Brishti; Srity Charon; Kototuku; Shoraikhana	2008	G-Series
Fuad feat. Topu (Yaatri) - Bondhu Bhabo Ki?	Topu, and Anila for Nupur 2	45 minutes and 40 seconds (11 songs)	Meye; Nupur 2; Banglar Gaan; Shottobadi Ami; Dishehara; Iccher Ghuri; Bolbona; Shei Je Tumi; Mitthebadi Ami; Question Mark	2008	G-Series
Fuad feat. Kona	Kona	(10 songs)	Borosha; Ekhoni Shomoy; Bhranti; Nei; Shopnobari; Obujh Proshno; Kotha Chhilo; Bhranti (Miftah)	2009	Agniveena
Fuad feat. Mila (Re-defined)	Mila	1 hour 10 minutes and 43 seconds (16 songs)	Intro; Dola; Brishty Naache Taale Taale; Disco Bandor; Nirobe; Nisha Lagilo Re; Tumi Ki Shara Debe?; Bisshash; Khola Akash; Chaader Buri (Re-mix); Paaper Pujari; Shopno; CTG Fun (Intro to Jaadu); Jaadu; Dola (Jatrabari Mix); Bisshashghatok Mir Jafar	2009	G-Series
The Gurus of Love	with Habib Wahid, Balam and Arnob	27 minutes (6 songs)	Nam Chhilo Na; Tumi Amar Jibone Esho; Chokhta Kholo; Nam Chilo Na (Remix); Tumi Amar Jibone Esho (Remix); Chokhta Kholo (Remix)	2009	Rage Records
Mathwali	Shireen	9 songs	Mathwali; Noni; Khajar Dewana; Monete Amar; Maizbhandari Rohmotullah; Halkuluth Bari; Khaja Tomar Prembajare; Benaroshi Sharee; Dekhe Jaare Maizbhandhari	2009	Laser Vision
Nilambori	with Shahid and Arfin Rumey	35 minutes 20 seconds (8 songs)	Ek Jibone Eto Prem; Ontorjami; Bhabna Nodi; Dhire Dhire; Dukkho Bilashi; Nilambori; Shyamol Megh; Shopner Haatchhani	2011	Laser Vision
Mala (Bhalobashai Bhul)	Mala	35 minutes and 51 seconds (8 songs)	Bhalobashai Bhul; Boshonto; Dhol Baaje; Haat Jaa; Ja Pakhi; Mon Bhore Dao; Rupali Raat; Topto Moru	2012	Unknown, Shadhin Music (stream)
The Hit Factory	Shuvo, Nazia, Arfin Rumey, Teejay, Sumi, Upol, Anila, Moury, Johad	1 hour 1 minutes (13 songs)	Ektai Amar Tumi; Taray Taray; Bolte Na Para Kotha; Nondini; Friendship Never Dies; Baluchore; Shundori Foori; Shopno Dana; Jodi Boli; Gurur Naam; Neon; Oporinoto Roop; Itihaash	2015	Unknown
Uncensored	Mila	43 minutes and 25 seconds (10 songs)	Isshor Jaane; Tona Toni; Anmone; Aissala; Nacho; Tona Toni (Remix); Phire Aay; Rodela; Shorto; Dhol (Remix)	2016	
