= Natok =

Form of theatre in Bangladesh and India

Natok (Bengali: নাটক) or play is a type of theater in Bangladesh and West Bengal. Natok also refers to any drama that is aired on any Bangladeshi TV channel. Natoks are currently popular in Bangladesh and are a common source of entertainment for Bangladeshi people. Bangla natoks are produced in both West Bengal, and Bangladesh which started in the early 19th century during the British rule. In that time, natoks were only performed in a theater. Later on, TV natoks gained more popularity than theaters.

== Etymology ==
Natok or Natak word came from Hindi word नौटंकी (nauṭaṅkī). Nautanki is a popular folk theater of northern India.

== Classification of Natok/play ==
The classification of plays is not based on any particular subject. Drama has been categorized in different ways according to different themes. The classifications of the plays are as follows:

A) According to the genre of emotion (01) Tragedy (02) Comedy (03) Tragedy-comedy (04) Melodrama and (05) Farce.

B) According to the source of content (01) Mythological (02) Historical (03) Historical fiction Characteristic (04) Social (05) Family (06) Fictional and (06) Fictional

C) According to the nature of the content (01) Religious (02) Ethical (03) Spiritual (04) Political (05) Economic (06) Erotic (06) Patriotic (08) Sociological (09) Conspiratorial (10) Thriller and (11) Crime detective etc.

D) According to the material features (01) Lyric drama or opera (02) Journey (03) Dance drama (04) Drama or drama

E) By volume or number (01) Mahanatak (02) Natak (03) Natika (04) Ekankika

F) Structural style (01) Classical (02) Romantic (03) Scenes

G) According to the style of composition (01) Poetry drama (02) Prose drama (03) Prose-verse drama

H) According to the presentation style (01) Actual drama (02) Ideological drama (03) Metaphorical drama (04) Symbolic drama (05) Expressionistic drama

I) According to the purpose (01) Ghatanamukhya (Molodrama) (02) Charitramukhya (Charitranatya) (03) Rasamukhya (Rasanatya) and (04) Tattvamukhya (Tattvanatak)
