= Third Person Singular Number =

Bangladeshi Film (2009)

- Home DVD cover
- Directed by: Mostofa Sarwar Farooki
- Written by: Anisul Hoque; Mostofa Sarwar Farooki
- Starring: Nusrat Imrose Tisha; Mosharraf Karim; Rashed Uddin Ahmed Topu; Abul Hayat
- Cinematography: Subrata Ripon
- Edited by: Titash Shaha
- Music by: Rezaul K. Leemon
- Production company: Impress Telefilm
- Distributed by: Impress Telefilm
- Release date: 11 December 2009
- Running time: 123 minutes
- Country: Bangladesh
- Language: Bengali

Third Person Singular Number (Bengali: থার্ড পারসন সিঙ্গুলার নাম্বার) is a 2009 Bangladeshi drama film directed and co-written by Mostofa Sarwar Farooki. It stars actors Mosharraf Karim, Nusrat Imrose Tisha, Abul Hayat and musician Topu.

== Plot ==
The story is a portrayal of a young woman, Ruba, whose live-in boyfriend has been sent to jail. The movie follows her struggles navigating a conservative society after his arrest.

== Cast ==
- Nusrat Imrose Tisha as Ruba
- Mosharraf Karim as Munna
- Rashed Uddin Ahmed Topu as himself
- Abul Hayat
- Rocky Chowdury
- Shuveccha Haque
- Esha
- Aparna Ghosh
- Rani Sarker

== Production ==
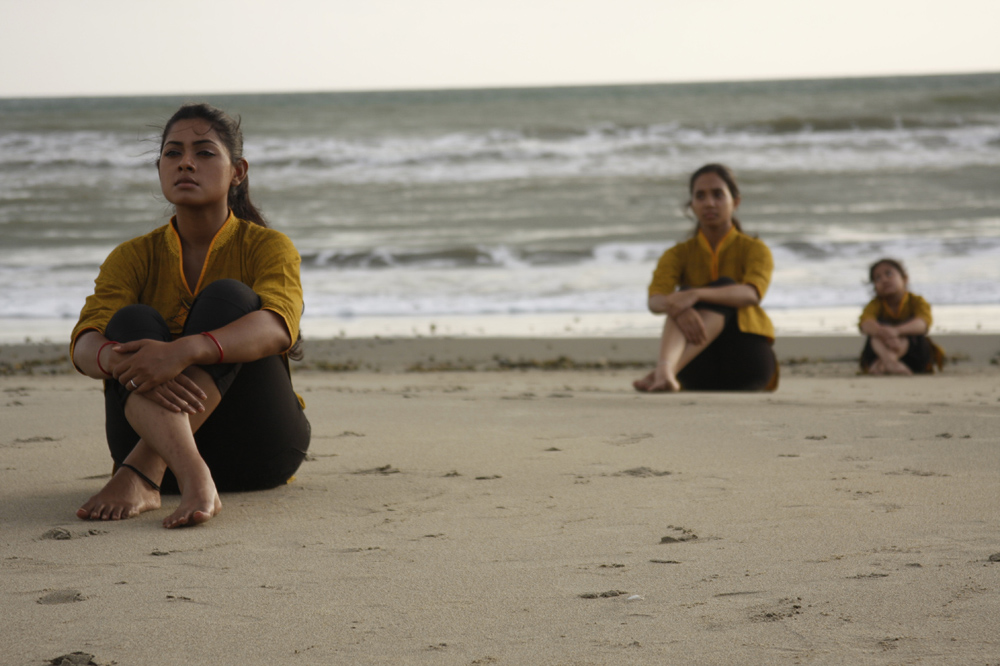
Tisha in the film Third Person Singular Number (2010)

The movie was inspired by the book, Tin Parber Jibon O Kichhu Bastab Case Study, by Syed Manzoorul Islam. The script was written jointly by Anisul Haque and Mostofa Sarwar Farooki. Nusrat Imrose Tisha made her debut in the movie. Arpana Gosh made her debut in the movie. Third Person Singular Number was produced by Impress Telefilms. The shooting of the movie was done in Dhaka, Comilla, Cox's Bazar and other places.

== Release ==
The film initially had trouble getting approval from Bangladesh Film Censor Board. It premiered in Star Cineplex, Dhaka on 10 December 2009. The film premiered at the Pusan International Film Festival 2009. It then went on to compete in Abu Dhabi Film Festival. Third Person Singular Number had its European premier at the Rotterdam IFF 2010. It traveled to festivals and received the best director award in Dhaka International Film Festival 2010. It was Bangladesh's official entry to the 83rd Oscar's foreign film category but didn't make the final shortlist.

=== Reception ===
Variety wrote that "Third Person Singular Number is a thoroughly modern, stylistically assured story of a young woman ... combining an indie sensibility with sub continental elements." Bangladeshi film critic Saif Samir criticized it and gave 2.5 out of 5 stars.

Topu received a Meril Prothom Alo award for his acting. The movie was awarded Best Film, Best Director for Farooki, Best actress in Meril Prothom Alo Awards 2010.

List of awards and nominations
Ciromonies	Year	Category	Recipients and nominees	Result	Ref.(s)
Meril-Prothom Alo Awards	2010	Critics Choice Award for Best Film	Impress Telefilm Limited - Faridur Reza Sagar	Won	
Meril-Prothom Alo Awards	2010	Critics Choice Award for Best Film Director	Mostofa Sarwar Farooki	Won	
Meril-Prothom Alo Awards	2010	Best Film Actress	Nusrat Imrose Tisha	Nominated	
Meril-Prothom Alo Awards	2010	Critics Choice Award for Best Film Actress	Nusrat Imrose Tisha	Won	
Meril-Prothom Alo Awards	2010	Best Male Singer	Habib Wahid - "Dwidha"	Won	
Meril-Prothom Alo Awards	2010	Best Female Singer	Nazmun Munira Nancy - "Dwidha"	Won	

== See also ==
- List of submissions to the 83rd Academy Awards for Best Foreign Language Film
- List of Bangladeshi submissions for the Academy Award for Best Foreign Language Film
