= Ferdous Wahid =

Bangladeshi singer-songwriter, composer and director

- ফেরদৌস ওয়াহিদ
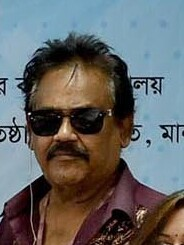
- Born: 12 March 1952 (age 74)
- Years active: 1970–2020
- Spouse: Roksana Wahid (m. 1977)
- Children: Habib Wahid
- Musical career
- Genres: Modern; Pop; soft rock
- Instruments: Vocals; guitar
- Labels: Sargam Records; Soundtek; Sonali; Sangeeta Music

Ferdous Wahid (born 12 March 1952) is a retired Bangladeshi pop singer. His notable songs include Mamooniya, Agey Jodi Jantam, Emon Ekta Maa Dena, Sajiye Gujiye Dey Morey,, Ei Je Duniya, Amar Premer Tori, and Ami Ek Paharadar. As of 2019, he rendered songs for over 50 films and released 23 single music albums.

== Career ==
Wahid started his career in the 1970s. Some of his hit songs while starting his career were composed by Anis Z. Chowdhury, Lucky Akhand and Alam Khan.

Wahid produced, directed and acted in the only film Kusumpurer Golpo (2014). His second film Durdhorsho Abhijan was never released.

Wahid retired from music industry in 2020.

== Personal life ==
Ferdous Wahid married Roksana Wahid in 1977. Their only son, Habib Wahid, is a musician.

Mustafa Jaglul Wahid (d. 2020), a Bangladesh Biman captain, and Faruk Wahid (d. 2020) were Ferdous' brothers. His another brother, Khasru Wahid, is the father of Farzana Wahid Shayan.

== Discography ==
=== Solo ===
- "Mujhe Aisi Ma Dena"
- "Ojana Kon Pothe"
- "Dhup Chaya"
- "Bhalobashbo"
- "Jonmo"

=== Duet ===
- "Thikana Bihin Pothe"
- "Obosheshe"

=== Film scores ===
- Common Gender

=== Mixed ===
- "Tin Pagoler Mela"
