= Hridoy Khan =

Bangladeshi musician, songwriter and singer

Hridoy Khan Rid হৃদয় খান
- Born: 3 January 1991 (age 35); Dhaka
- Genres: Film score; Techno; Fusion; Pop; Rock
- Occupations: Singer; songwriter; composer; actor
- Instruments: Vocals; keyboards; guitar
- Years active: 2008–present
- Website: instagram.com/hridoykhanofficial

Hridoy Khan (born 3 January 1991) is a Bangladeshi singer, music composer, musical artist, and actor.

== Life and career ==
Khan comes from a musical background. His grandfather is a music teacher, and his father composes jingles.

Khan released his first album, Hridoy Mix I, in 2008 at age 17. His first solo album, Bol Na, followed the next year. By late 2014, he had released four more albums, Hridoy Mix-2, Chhowa, Hridoy Mix-3 and Bhalo Lage Na.

== Film soundtracks ==
- Amar Praner Priya (2009)

Mone Prane Acho Tumi 2009

- Chorabali (2012)
- I Love You (2012)
- Most Welcome (2012)
- Ant Story (2013)
- Eito Bhalobasa (2013)
- Television (2012)
- Ami Shudhu Cheyechi Tomay (2014)
- Love Marriage (2015)
- Aro Bhalobashbo Tomay (2015)
- Sweetheart (2016)

== Personal life ==
Hridoy Khan married Purnima Akter in 2010. The marriage lasted six months. He married Sumaiya Zafar Suzana, a model, in August 2014, after a relationship of three and a half years. The couple divorced in April 2015. In September 2017, he married Humaira. The couple also divorced in 2024.
