= Nazmun Munira Nancy =

Bangladeshi singer

- নাজমুন মুনিরা ন্যান্সি
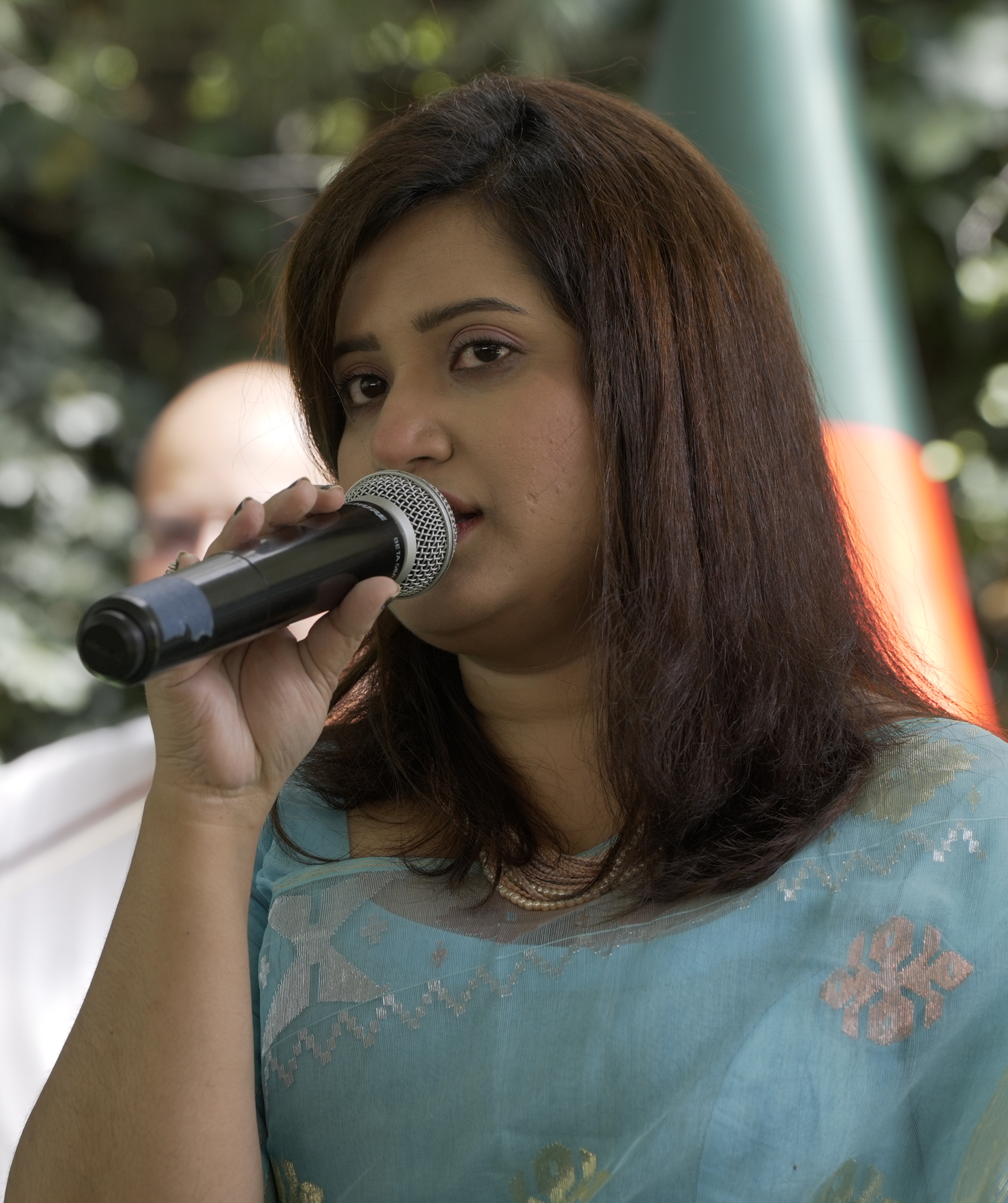
- Nancy in 2025
- Occupation: Singer
- Years active: 2007–present
- Spouses: Abu Syed Sourob (m. 2006; div. 2012); Nazimuzzaman Zayed (m. 2013; div. 2021); Mohsin Mehedi (m. 2021)
- Children: 3

Nazmun Munira Nancy (13 December 1988) is a Bangladeshi singer. She ৩won Bangladesh National Film Award for Best Female Playback Singer for her playback in the film Projapoti (2011). She received Meril-Prothom Alo Awards Best Female Singer Award for six times.

== Career ==
She born on 13 December 1988 in Narail, Bangladesh. Her father name is Naimul Huq and mother name is Josna Huq. Nancy began her career in 2002. She has sung several jingles for television. She became an enlisted artist at Bangladesh Betar in 2002 as a Nazrul, modern and folk singer. She released her first album Bhalobasha Odhora in 2009.

== Discography ==
- Bhalobasha Odhora (2009)
- Rong (2012)
- Dushtu Chhele (2015)
- Amar Priyotomo (2016)
- Bhalobashbo Bolei (2016)

== Personal life ==
In 2006, Nancy married a businessman named Abu Syed Sourob and has a daughter, Rodela. On 4 March 2013, Nancy married Nazimuzzaman Zayed, an employee of Mymensingh City Corporation, for the second time. On 8 January 2014, Nancy gave birth to a daughter, Nyla. Her father, Niamul Haque, died on 10 August 2020 at the age of 65. Nancy married lyricist Mohsin Mehedi, the chief operating officer (COO) of Yoga Anupam Music, in 2021 after courtship due to the song. On 13 January 2022, Nancy announced her pregnancy with her third child, Mehenaz. On 26 August 2024, in an interview on Bangla Vision, Nancy revealed how she has suffered politically under the Awami League regime and how it hampered her career, personal life and social status.

== Awards and nominations ==
Year	Award Title	Category	Film/Song	Result
2009	Meril Prothom Alo Awards	Best Female Playback Singer	Third Person Singular Number (Dwidha)	Won
2010	Meril Prothom Alo Awards	Best Female Playback Singer	Shishir Bheja	Won
2011	National Film Awards	Best Female Playback Singer	Projapoti	Won
2011	Meril Prothom Alo Awards	Best Female Playback Singer	Pagol Tor Jonno Re	Won
2012	Meril Prothom Alo Awards	Best Female Playback Singer	Bhalobasi Tomay	Won
2013	Meril Prothom Alo Awards	Best Female Playback Singer	Akash Hote Chai	Won
2013	Bioscope Borsho-sera	Best Singer (Female)	Jole Jole Jonaki...	Won
2014	Meril Prothom Alo Awards	Best Female Playback Singer	-	Won
2014	CJFB Performance Award 2014	Best Singer (Female)		Won
2015	Meril Prothom Alo Awards	Best Female Playback Singer	-	Won
2026	Meril-Prothom Alo Awards	Best Female Playback Singer	"Prohor" from the film Domm	Nominated
