= Habib Wahid =

Bangladeshi singer, composer and music director

- হাবিব ওয়াহিদ
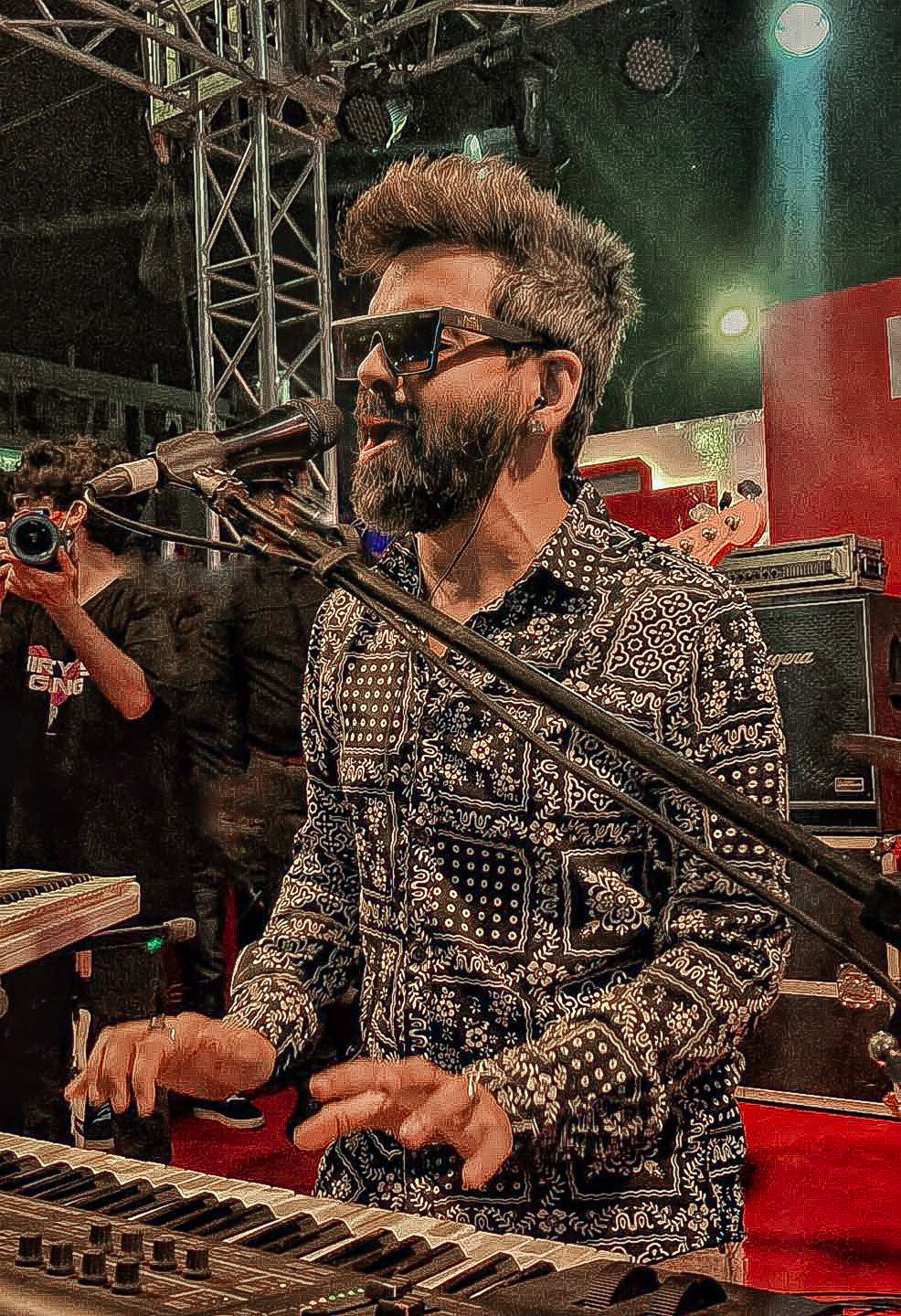
- Wahid in 2022
- Pronunciation: [habib o̯aɦid̪]
- Born: 15 October 1979 (age 46); Dhaka, Bangladesh
- Occupations: Composer; Record producer; Singer
- Years active: 2003–present
- Spouse: Rehana Chowdhury (m. 2011; div. 2017) Afsana Chowdhury Shifa (m. 2020)
- Children: 2
- Father: Ferdous Wahid
- Relatives: Farzana Wahid Shayan (cousin)
- Awards: Meril Prothom Alo Award; National Film Award
- Musical career
- Genres: Pop; film score; EDM; world; rock; folk; R&B
- Instruments: Keyboards; vocals
- Labels: Sangeeta Music; Ektaar Music; CD Choice; Laser Vision; Deadline Music; HW Productions; Times Music; SVF; T-Series.; Saregama; Tips; Sony Music; Zee Music Company; Junglee Music; Universal Music India; Warner Music India; YRF Music

Habib Wahid (Note: Bengali: হাবিব ওয়াহিদ, Bengali pronunciation: [habib o̯aɦid̪].) (Bengali: হাবিব ওয়াহিদ, pronounced [habib o̯aɦid̪]; born 15 October 1979) is a Bangladeshi music composer and singer. He is the son of composer Ferdous Wahid. Habib gained prominence in the early 2000s for his unique fusion of traditional Bangladeshi folk music and contemporary pop elements. He is considered a pioneer of modern pop music in Bangladesh.

He quickly gained popularity in 2003 with his debut album, Krishno, whose title song "Krishno" was an instant hit. Throughout his career, Habib Wahid has released numerous hit singles and albums, including Shono (2008) and Moina Go (2005), establishing himself as one of the leading figures in the Bangladeshi music industry. He won the Bangladesh National Film Award for Best Music Director for the film Projapoti in 2011.

== Early life and education ==
Habib Wahid was born and brought up in Dhaka, Bangladesh, to Ferdous Wahid, a Bangladeshi pop singer, and Roksana Wahid. His ancestral home is in South Paiksha in Srinagar of Munshiganj (Bikrampur). He attended South Breeze School in Dhanmondi.

== Career ==
=== 2003: Debut with Krishno ===
Wahid started working with other Asian music producers, such as Karsh Kale, while in the UK. Wahid was already working as a music producer, however he needed a vocalist to develop his new album. While living in London, he found the vocalist Kaya, a Sylheti restaurant owner, who would collaborate with him on the album. In 2003, Wahid released his first album, Krishno, a collaborative effort with Wahid producing the music while Kaya sang. The album proved successful in Britain and Bangladesh. The album Krishno was a fusion of folk and modern Ektaar Music Ltd, introducing a new genre to the Dhaka music arena.

=== 2004–2014: Successful albums and soundtracks ===
In the next few years, Wahid released six albums: Maya (2004), Moina Go (2005), Shono (2006), Panjabiwala (2007), Bolchi Tomake (2008), and O Bosheshe (2008). To keep Bangladeshi music growing, Wahid would usually introduce new artists in his albums. Besides Kaya, he has showcased singers such as Helal, Julee, Nirjhor, Shireen, and Nancy in these albums. Wahid debuted as a vocalist in his album Moina Go, where he sang two tracks, Din Gelo and Esho Brishti Namai. He also featured his father, Ferdous Wahid, as a singer in his albums. On 1 June 2011, Wahid's 8th album, Ahoban!, was released. The album consists of 9 tracks, of which three are duet songs with Nancy and Kona, and Ferdous Wahid sang one track. Wahid released another album named Shadhin in December 2012.

In addition to his solo albums, Wahid also has released collaborative albums as well. Similar to how Krishno heavily featured Kaya, Maya also featured Kaya and Helal. In 2007, Wahid released the album Panjabiwala with Shireen Jawad. After featuring him on several tracks in different albums, Habib Wahid released a collaborative album with his father, Ferdous Wahid, O Bosheshe, in 2008. Later with the label Deadline Music, Wahid would release Somorpon with Aurthohin & Warfaze in 2011, as well as Rong with Nancy in 2012.

Wahid also has composed songs for different film soundtracks such as Hridoyer Kotha, Akash Chhoa Bhalobasa, Chandragrohon, I Love You (2012 film), Eito Prem, Third Person Singular Number, Amar Ache Jol, and many others. Wahid makes songs that "have the essence from the roots of Bangla music", says Kumar Bishwajit while recording a song under the direction of Wahid in a movie called Projapoti.

=== 2015–present: Singles and new projects ===
Habib Wahid began a new chapter in his career with the release of his debut single, "Hariye Fela Bhalobasha", an R&B/soul song. Wahid described this new chapter as a result of an evolved music market, saying that since his audience often buys his songs for ringtones, he can earn good profits from releasing one single at a time rather than an entire album. Later in the summer of 2015, Wahid released his second single, "Mon Ghumay Re", a world song that blends rock, folk, and electronic music. Wahid also performed at Bangla Beats in 2015, a concert in the UK promoting Bangla music and culture along with other artists including Ferdous Wahid, Nancy, Hridoy Khan, and Mumzy Stranger. Wahid also produced the single "Cholo Bangladesh" for Grameenphone, a promotional song for the 2015 Cricket World Cup sung by rock musicians Zohad Reza Chowdhury and Imrul Karim Emil. Additional production for the track was done by Pritom Hasan, a musician who would work with Wahid and release his own music in the future.

Wahid began 2016 with the single "Tomar Akash", a pop song. In the summer Wahid released another single, "Moner Thikana", a love song written and produced by himself. A month later, Wahid released "Beporawa Mon", a single that would later be used in the film Ami Tomar Hote Chai. Wahid also released other singles from different visual media, such as "Meghe Dhaka Shohor" from the TV serial of the same name and "Tumi Amar" from the film Sultana Bibiana, a duet with Nancy and additionally produced by Pritom Hasan. Later in 2016, Wahid released the single "Ei Bangla Ei Manush" for the World Bank's End Poverty Day campaign. The song is about the people of Bangladesh and the success they have gotten in the ongoing fight against poverty.

To begin 2017, Wahid released his single "Tumi Hina", released independently through his label HW Productions. Wahid later released his single, "Mitthe Noy", on Valentine's Day. In contrast to the slow R&B songs that he just released, Wahid's "Ghum" is an upbeat pop electronic song that was released in spring 2017. In the summer, Wahid released the single "Golaper Din", which features frequent collaborator Nancy.

In September 2025, Wahid released his "Moha Jadu", a mesmerizing blend of Bangla mysticism and Persian poetry, featuring Tajikistani artist Mehrnigori Rustam, labeled by Coke Studio Bangla, season 3. The song got multiple applause from different parts of the world, including over 30 million views in the first month.

== Personal life ==
He married Rehana Chowdhury in 2011, and together they have a son, Alim Wahid (b. 2012). They divorced in 2017. It was rumored that Wahid cheated on Rehana with actress Tanjin Tisha.

In January 2021, Wahid announced that he had recently married Afsana Chowdhury Shifa. They have a son, Ayat (b. 2021).

Habib is the son of pop pioneer Ferdous Wahid, Farzana Wahid Shayan is his cousin.

== Discography ==
=== Solo albums ===
Year	Name	Label	Reference
2006	Shono	Laser Vision	
2008	Bolchi Tomake	Sangeeta	
2011	Ahoban!	Deadline Music	
2012	Shadhin	Deadline Music	

=== Collaborative albums ===
Year	Name	Other Artists	Label	Reference
2003	Krishno	Kaya	Ektaar Music	
2004	Maya	Kaya & Helal	Ektaar Music	
2005	Moina Go	Featured Artists	Ektaar Music	
2007	Panjabiwala	Shireen Jawad	Laser Vision	
2008	O Bosheshe	Ferdous Wahid	Sangeeta	
2011	Somorpon	Aurthohin & Warfaze	Deadline Music	
2012	Rong	Nancy	Deadline Music	

=== Compilation albums ===
Year	Name	Label	Reference
2009	Obosheshe	Sangeeta	

=== Singles ===
Year	Name	Label	Notes	Reference
2015	"Hariye Fela Bhalobasha"	Sangeeta	Feat.Peya Bipasha	
2015	"Mon Ghumay Re"	Multisourcing Ltd		
2016	"Tomar Akash"	Robi Yonder		
2016	"Moner Thikana"	Multisourcing Ltd	Feat. Sarlina; Lyrics by Riddhi	
2016	"Beporawa Mon"	Unlimited Audio Video	Feat. Tanjin Tisha	
2016	"Meghe Dhaka Shohor" (with Nirjhor)	CD Choice	Featured in the 2015 TV serial Meghe Dhaka Shohor; Lyrics by Zahid Akbar	
2016	"Tumi Amar" (with Nancy)	CD Choice	From the soundtrack Sultana Bibiana	
2016	"Ei Bangla Ei Manush"	Sangeeta	Released for the World Bank's End Poverty Day; Lyrics by Sharmin Sultana Sumi From Chirkutt	
2017	"Tumi Hina"	HW Productions	Lyrics by Minar Rahman	
2017	"Mitthe Noy"	Dhruba Music Station	Lyrics by Shafiq Tuhin	
2017	"Ghum"	Sangeeta	Feat. Rafiath Rashid Mithila; Lyrics by Shuhrid Sufiyan	
2017	"Golaper Din" (featuring Nancy)	HW Productions	Lyrics by Shuhrid Sufiyan	
2017	"Tor E Janalay" (with Nancy)	HW Productions		
2018	"Cholo Na"	Gaanchill Music	Music composed by Fuad; Feat. Sarlina Hossain	
2022	"Beni Khule" (with Muza)	Qinetic Music	Feat. Aabir Khan, Farjana Mahbub Poly, Joyshree Debi, Sadia Ethila, Saiful Islam Sabbir, Suporno Chakraborty, Tisa Rema, Sazz Enrique, Anila Iqbal, Ridy Sheikh, Ishrat Zaheen Ahmed, Sadiya A. Suchita, Shanaya Shahnaz, Farzana Faiza Bushra, TJ Faiza, Abrar Zahin Music composed by Russell Ali, Muza & Fuad Lyrics by Faujia Sultana & Muza	

== Awards ==
Year	Nominated work	Category	Award	Result	Notes	Ref.
2006	"Valobashbo Bashbo Re" from Hridoyer Kotha	Best Singer (Male)	Meril Prothom Alo Awards	Won		
2008	Bolchi Tomake	Best Singer (Male)	Meril Prothom Alo Awards	Won		
2009	"Dwidha" from Third Person Singular Number	Best Singer (Male)	Meril Prothom Alo Awards	Won		
2010	"Projapoti" from Projapoti	Best Singer (Male)	Meril Prothom Alo Awards	Won		
2011	Projapoti	Best Music Director	National Film Awards	Won		
2012	Shadhin	Best Singer (Male)	Meril Prothom Alo Awards	Won		
