= List of Coke Studio Bangla episodes =

Coke Studio Bangla is a Bangladeshi music series and the Bangladeshi edition of the Coke Studio franchise. It features studio-recorded music performances by established and emerging Bangladeshi artists, with the goal of promoting Bangladeshi music. As the digital-first music platform under the Coke Studio franchise, it was launched in Bangladesh on 7 February 2022. The second season began airing on 14 February 2023, and the third season started airing on 13 April 2024.

== Series overview ==
Season	Episodes	Originally released	
Season	Episodes	First released	Last released
1	10	February 7, 2022	September 1, 2022
2	12	February 14, 2023	September 9, 2023
Special: Murir Tin Animation		October 10, 2023	
Special: Victory Day		December 15, 2023	
3	8	April 13, 2024	November 16, 2025
4	8	23 May 2026	TBA

== Episodes ==
=== Season 1 ===
No. overall	No. in season	Song Title	Singer(s)	Lyricist(s)	Composer(s)	Stream	Original release date
1	-	"Ekla Cholo"	Featured Artists	Gagan Harkara, Ziaur Rahman & Rabindranath Tagore	Arnob (Note: "Ekla Cholo" was not an official song, rather it was an opener to the franchise in Bangladesh.)	Watch on YouTube Listen on Spotify	February 7, 2022
2	1	"Nasek Nasek"	Animes Roy & Pantho Kanai	Animes Roy & Abdul Latif	Adit Rahman (Note: "Nasek Nasek" was originally composed by Animes Roy and "Dol Dol Doloni" was originally composed by Abdul Latif.)	Watch on YouTube Listen on Spotify	February 23, 2022
3	2	"Prarthona"	Momtaz Begum & Mizan Rahman	Bangladeshi folk music, Girin Chakraborty & Ramesh Shil	Arnob (Note: "Allah Megh De" was originally composed by Girin Chakraborty and "Baba Maulana" was originally composed by Ramesh Shil.)	Watch on YouTube Listen on Spotify	April 1, 2022
4	3	"Bulbuli"	Rituraj Baidya & Sanzida Mahmood Nandita	Kazi Nazrul Islam & Syed Gousul Alam Shaon	Shuvendu Das Shuvo (Note: "Bagichay Bulbuli Tui" was originally composed by Kazi Nazrul Islam.)	Watch on YouTube Listen on Spotify	April 14, 2022
5	4	"Bhober Pagol"	Nigar Sumi & Jalali Set	Collected, Jalali Set & K.M. Mehedi Hasan Ansari	Arnob & Faizan Rashid Ahmad	Watch on YouTube Listen on Spotify	May 3, 2022
6	5	"Chiltey Roud"	Arnob & Ripon Kumar Sarkar	Saron Datta & Abbasuddin Ahmed	Arnob (Note: Bhawaiya "O ki ekbar ashiya" was originally composed by Abdul Karim.)	Watch on YouTube Listen on Spotify	May 15, 2022
7	6	"Bhinnotar Utshob"	Animes Roy, Jannatul Firdous Akbar, Pantho Kanai, Rubayat Rehman, Shayan Chowdhury Arnob, Sunidhi Nayak, Tashbiha Binte Shahid Mila & Zohad Reza Chowdhury	K.M. Mehedi Hasan Ansari, Syed Gousul Alam Shaon, Divash Krishna Biswas & Ruslan Rehman	Arnob	(Note: "Bhinnotar Utshob" is not available on Spotify.)	June 3, 2022
8	7	"Shob Lokey Koy"	Kaniz Khandaker Mitu & Soumyadeep Murshidabadi	Lalon & Kabir	Arnob (Note: "Shob Lokey Koy" was originally written and composed by Lalon and "Kabira Kaun Ek Hai" was originally written and composed by Kabir.)	Watch on YouTube Listen on Spotify	June 21, 2022
9	8	"Lilabali"	Warda Ashraf, Armeen Musa, Sanzida Mahmood Nandita, Masha Islam, Rubayat Rehman, Jannatul Firdous Akbar, Karishma Shanu Sovvota, Tasfia Fatima (Tashfee) & Md. Makhon Mia	Radharaman Dutta & Shahidullah Faraizee	Arnob (Note: "Lilabali" was originally composed by Radharaman Dutta and "Bhober Deshe Thako Konna" was originally composed by Bari Siddiqui.)	Watch on YouTube Listen on Spotify	July 13, 2022
10	9	"Dokhino Hawa"	Madhubanti Bagchi & Tahsan Rahman Khan	Meera Dev Burman & Syed Gousul Alam Shaon	Arnob (Note: The initial part "Shono Go" was originally composed by S. D. Burman. Tahsan's part "Utture Hawa" was criticised for having "a lot in common" with "Sofia" by Clairo and "Follow You" by Imagine Dragons.)	(Note: "Dokhino Hawa" is currently unavailable on the official Coke Studio Bangla YouTube channel and its Spotify listing appears under the Saregama Bangla label; the circumstances of this redistribution are unclear.)	August 5, 2022
11	10	"Hey Samalo"	Bappa Mazumder, Samina Chowdhury, Shayan Chowdhury Arnob, Sunidhi Nayak, Rituraj Baidya, Dilshad Nahar Kona, Warda Ashraf, Armeen Musa, Sanzida Mahmood Nandita, Masha Islam, Rubayat Rehman, Jannatul Firdous Akbar, Sinha Hasan, Ripon Kumar Sarkar, Animes Roy	Salil Chowdhury & Abdul Latif	Arnob (Note: "Hey Samalo Dhan Ho" was originally composed by Salil Chowdhury and "Ora Amar Mukher Bhasha" was originally composed and sung by Abdul Latif.)	(Note: "Hey Samalo" is currently unavailable on the official Coke Studio Bangla YouTube channel and its Spotify listing appears under the Saregama Bangla label; the circumstances of this redistribution are unclear.)	September 1, 2022

=== Season 2 ===
No. overall	No. in season	Song Title	Singer(s)	Lyricist(s)	Composer(s)	Stream	Original release date
12	1	"Murir Tin"	Pollob Vai, Riad Hasan & Towfique Ahmed	Riad Hasan, Pollob Vai & Towfique Ahmed	Shuvendu Das Shuvo (Note: Murir Tin originally written & composed by Riad Hasan)	Watch on YouTube Listen on Spotify	February 14, 2023
13	2	"Bonobibi"	Jahura Baul & Meghdol	Shibu Kumer Shill, Mejbaur Rahman Sumon & Khonar Bachan (Note: Khonar Bachan: Phrases of Khona' has been collected and adapted from a wide range of Bengali folklore)	Meghdol	Watch on YouTube Listen on Spotify	March 3, 2023
14	3	"Nahubo"	Animes Roy & Daughter of Coastal	Animes Roy & Daughter of Coastal	Sayonton Mangsang	Watch on YouTube Listen on Spotify	March 18, 2023
15	4	"Darale Duaarey"	Mukul Mojumder Ishaan & Sanzida Mahmood Nandita	Kazi Nazrul Islam	Shuvendu Das Shuvo (Note: Originally composed by Kazi Nazrul Islam)	Watch on YouTube Listen on Spotify	April 21, 2023
16	5	"Deora"	Ghaashphoring Choir, Islam Uddin Palakar, Pritom Hasan & Fazlu Majhi	Pritom Hasan & Fazlu Majhi	Pritom Hasan	Watch on YouTube Listen on Spotify	May 7, 2023
17	6	"Nodir Kul"	Arnob, Idris Rahman & Ripon Kumar Sarkar	Jasimuddin	Arnob (Note: Originally composed by Jasimuddin)	Watch on YouTube Listen on Spotify	May 25, 2023
18	7	"Kotha Koiyo Na"	Arfan Mredha Shiblu & Aleya Begum	Hashim Mahmod & Maimansingha Gitika	Emon Chowdhury	Watch on YouTube Listen on Spotify	June 10, 2023
19	8	"Dewana"	Fuad Al Muqtadir, Soumyadeep Murshidabadi, Shuchona Shely & Tasfia Fatima	Pagol Goni Mastan & Srijato	Fuad Al Muqtadi (Note: "Asheqjon" was originally composed by Pagol Goni Mastan)	Watch on YouTube Listen on Spotify	June 24, 2023
20	9	"Shondhatara"	Arnob, Adit Rahman & Sunidhi Nayak	Divash Krishna Biswas	Ustad Vilayat Hussain Khan	Watch on YouTube Listen on Spotify	July 8, 2023
21	10	"Ghum Ghum"	Fairooz Nazifa & Shuvendu Das Shuvo	S.M Hedayat	Lucky Akhand	Watch on YouTube Listen on Spotify	July 23, 2023
22	11	"Anondodhara"	Adity Mohsin & Bappa Mazumder	Rabindranath Tagore	Rabindranath Tagore	Watch on YouTube Listen on Spotify	August 6, 2023
23	12	"Dilaram"	Arnob & Hamida Banu	Hason Raja	Shamarin Dewan	Watch on YouTube Listen on Spotify	September 9, 2023

=== Murir Tin Animation ===
No. overall	No. in season	Song Title	Singer(s)	Lyricist(s)	Composed by	Stream	Original release date
24	-	"Murir Tin"	Pollob Vai, Riad Hasan & Towfique Ahmed	Riad Hasan, Pollob Vai & Towfique Ahmed	Shuvendu Das Shuvo	Watch on YouTube	October 10, 2023

The animated video was directed by Antik Mahmud of Antik Animated Studio, released as a teaser for the Coke Studio Bangla concert held at Army Stadium, Dhaka. The video depicted all Coke Studio Bangla artists embarking on a musical journey aboard a bus heading to the concert.

=== Victory Day ===
No. overall	No. in season	Song Title	Singer(s)	Lyricist(s)	Composed by	Stream	Original release date
25	-	"Karar Oi Louho Kopat"	Arnob, Emon Chowdhury, Hasib & Students from various educational institutions (Note: The song was performed by young students from numerous educational institutions across Bangladesh alongside lead vocalists Arnob, Emon Chowdhury, and Hasib, to commemorate the 53rd Victory Day.)	Kazi Nazrul Islam	Kazi Nazrul Islam (Note: Coke Studio Bangla performed the song in its original tune as composed by Kazi Nazrul Islam, in contrast to A.R. Rahman's controversial recomposition for the 2023 Hindi film Pippa.)	Watch on YouTube Listen on Spotify	December 15, 2023

=== Season 3 ===
No. overall	No. in season	Song Title	Singer(s)	Lyricist(s)	Composer(s)	Stream	Original release date
26	1	"Tati"	Arnob, Jaya Ahsan, Md. Gonjer Ali & Oli Boy	Oli Boy, Md. Gonjer Ali & Shatarupa Thakurta Roy	Shayan Chowdhury Arnob	Watch on YouTube Listen on Spotify	April 13, 2024
27	2	"Ma Lo Ma"	Aly Hasan, Arif Dewan, Pritom Hasan & Shagor Dewan	Aly Hasan, Baul Rashid Uddin & Md. Khalek Dewan	Pritom Hasan	Watch on YouTube Listen on Spotify	May 3, 2024
28	3	"Obak Bhalobasha"	Babna Karim (Ex-Warfaze) & Palash Noor	Babna Karim	Warfaze with Coke Studio Bangla Team	Watch on YouTube Listen on Spotify	May 25, 2024
29	4	"Baaji"	Emon Chowdhury	Hashim Mahmud	Shayan Chowdhury Arnob	Watch on YouTube Listen on Spotify	23 August 2025
30	5	"Long Distance Love"	Ankan Kumar Roy & Sheikh Mumtahina Mehzabin Afrin	Ankan Kumar Roy	Shuvendu Das Shuvo	Watch on YouTube Listen on Spotify	11 September 2025
31	6	"Moha Jadu"	Habib Wahid & Mehrnigori Rustam	Baul Shah Khoyaj Mia, Syed Gousul Alam Shaon, Hadis Deghan (Farsi)	Habib Wahid	Watch on YouTube Listen on Spotify	25 September 2025
32	7	"Café"	Tanzir Tuhin, Lívia Mattos, Gaurab Chatterjee	Unknown	TBA	Watch on YouTube Listen on Spotify	25 October 2025
33	8	"Mast Qalandar"	Runa Laila	Amir Khusrau, Bulleh Shah, Hason Raja	Shayan Chowdhury Arnob, Adit Rahman	Watch on YouTube Listen on Spotify	16 November 2025

=== Season 4 ===
No. overall	No. in season	Song Title	Singer(s)	Lyricist(s)	Composer(s)	Stream	Original release date
34	1	"Room Jhoom"	Hande Çevgel, Mustafa İpek, Mahtim Shakib, Nusrat Jahan	Ottoman Turkish folk song and Kazi Nazrul Islam	Kazi Nazrul Islam	Watch on YouTube Listen on Spotify	23 May 2026
35	2	"Megh"	Mohammed Shoeb, Masha Islam, Mousumi Dutta	Rabindranath Tagore (inspired)	Mohammed Shoeb, Arnob	Watch on YouTube Listen on Spotify	28 June 2026
