= Coke Studio Bangla season 1 =

First television season of Coke Studio Bangla

Coke Studio Bangla
- Season 1
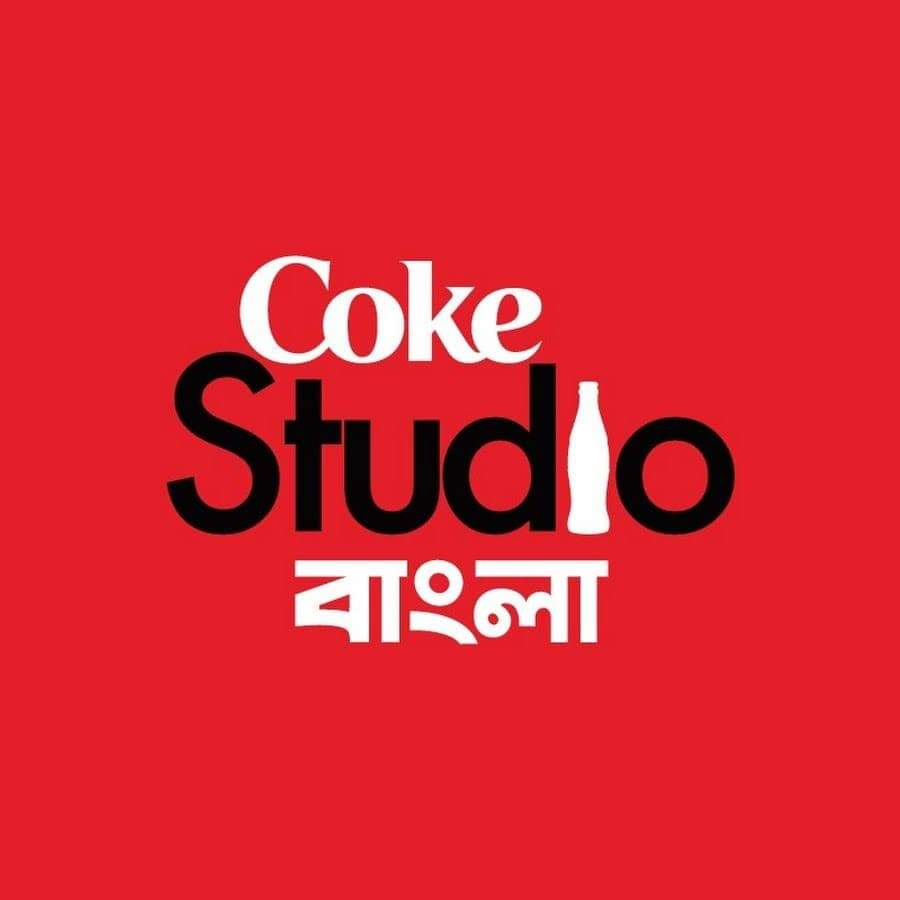
- Native name: কোক স্টুডিও বাংলা সিজন ১
- Starring: Featured Artists
- No. of episodes: 10

Release
- Original network: Deepto TV and Webcast
- Original release: 7 February – 1 September 2022

Season chronology
- Next → Season 2

The first edition of the Bangladeshi music television series Coke Studio Bangla aired starting from 7 February to 1 September 2022. The season was produced by Shayan Chowdhury Arnob and distributed by Coca-Cola Bangladesh.

== Featured artists ==
- Animes Roy
- Armeen Musa
- Bappa Mazumder
- Dilshad Nahar Kona
- Jalali Set (Band)
- Jannatul Firdous Akbar
- Kaniz Khandaker Mitu
- Karishma Shanu Sovvota
- Madhubanti Bagchi
- Masha Islam
- Md. Makhon Mia
- Mizan Rahman
- Momtaz Begum
- Nigar Sumi
- Pantha Kanai
- Ripon Kumar Sarkar (Boga)
- Rituraj Baidya
- Rubayat Rehman
- Samina Chowdhury
- Sanzida Mahmood Nandita
- Shayan Chowdhury Arnob
- Sinha Hasan
- Soumyadeep Murshidabadi
- Sunidhi Nayak
- Tahsan Rahman Khan
- Tasfia Fatima (Tashfi)
- Tashbiha Binte Shahid Mila
- Warda Ashraf
- Zohad Reza Chowdhury

== Production ==
Speaking at the launch of Coke Studio Bangla Season 1, Shayan Chowdhury Arnob said,

Coke Studio is the embodiment of cultural fusion and soothing mixture of diverse melodies. And being able to join the platform as a music producer is a matter of great pride for me.

— Shayan Chowdhury Arnob, producer Coke Studio Bangla

== Songs ==
All songs were produced by Shayan Chowdhury Arnob.

No. overall	No. in season	Song Title	Singer(s)	Lyricist(s)	Composer(s)	Original release date
1	-	"Ekla Cholo"	Featured Artists	Gagan Harkara, Ziaur Rahman & Rabindranath Tagore	Arnob (Note: "Ekla Cholo" was not an official song, rather it was an opener to the franchise in Bangladesh.)	February 7, 2022
2	1	"Nasek Nasek"	Animes Roy & Pantho Kanai	Animes Roy & Abdul Latif	Adit Rahman (Note: "Nasek Nasek" was originally composed by Animes Roy and "Dol Dol Doloni" was originally composed by Abdul Latif.)	February 23, 2022
3	2	"Prarthona"	Momtaz Begum & Mizan Rahman	Bangladeshi folk music, Girin Chakraborty & Ramesh Shil	Arnob (Note: "Allah Megh De" was originally composed by Girin Chakraborty and "Baba Maulana" was originally composed by Ramesh Shil.)	April 1, 2022
4	3	"Bulbuli"	Rituraj Baidya & Sanzida Mahmood Nandita	Kazi Nazrul Islam & Syed Gousul Alam Shaon	Shuvendu Das Shuvo (Note: "Bagichay Bulbuli Tui" was originally composed by Kazi Nazrul Islam.)	April 14, 2022
5	4	"Bhober Pagol"	Nigar Sumi & Jalali Set	Collected, Jalali Set & K.M. Mehedi Hasan Ansari	Arnob & Faizan Rashid Ahmad	May 3, 2022
6	5	"Chiltey Roud"	Arnob & Ripon Kumar Sarkar	Saron Datta & Abbasuddin Ahmed	Arnob (Note: Bhawaiya "O ki ekbar ashiya" was originally composed by Abdul Karim.)	May 15, 2022
7	6	"Bhinnotar Utshob"	Animes Roy, Jannatul Firdous Akbar, Pantho Kanai, Rubayat Rehman, Shayan Chowdhury Arnob, Sunidhi Nayak, Tashbiha Binte Shahid Mila & Zohad Reza Chowdhury	K.M. Mehedi Hasan Ansari, Syed Gousul Alam Shaon, Divash Krishna Biswas & Ruslan Rehman	Arnob	June 3, 2022
8	7	"Shob Lokey Koy"	Kaniz Khandaker Mitu & Soumyadeep Murshidabadi	Lalon & Kabir	Arnob (Note: "Shob Lokey Koy" was originally written and composed by Lalon and "Kabira Kaun Ek Hai" was originally written and composed by Kabir.)	June 21, 2022
9	8	"Lilabali"	Warda Ashraf, Armeen Musa, Sanzida Mahmood Nandita, Masha Islam, Rubayat Rehman, Jannatul Firdous Akbar, Karishma Shanu Sovvota, Tasfia Fatima (Tashfee) & Md. Makhon Mia	Radharaman Dutta & Shahidullah Faraizee	Arnob (Note: "Lilabali" was originally composed by Radharaman Dutta and "Bhober Deshe Thako Konna" was originally composed by Bari Siddiqui.)	July 13, 2022
10	9	"Dokhino Hawa"	Madhubanti Bagchi & Tahsan Rahman Khan	Meera Dev Burman & Syed Gousul Alam Shaon	Arnob (Note: The initial part "Shono Go" was originally composed by S. D. Burman. Tahsan's part "Utture Hawa" was criticised for having "a lot in common" with "Sofia" by Clairo and "Follow You" by Imagine Dragons.)	August 5, 2022
11	10	"Hey Samalo"	Bappa Mazumder, Samina Chowdhury, Shayan Chowdhury Arnob, Sunidhi Nayak, Rituraj Baidya, Dilshad Nahar Kona, Warda Ashraf, Armeen Musa, Sanzida Mahmood Nandita, Masha Islam, Rubayat Rehman, Jannatul Firdous Akbar, Sinha Hasan, Ripon Kumar Sarkar, Animes Roy	Salil Chowdhury & Abdul Latif	Arnob (Note: "Hey Samalo Dhan Ho" was originally composed by Salil Chowdhury and "Ora Amar Mukher Bhasha" was originally composed and sung by Abdul Latif.)	September 1, 2022
