= Coke Studio Bangla season 4 =

Fourth television season of Coke Studio Bangla

Coke Studio Bangla
- Season 4
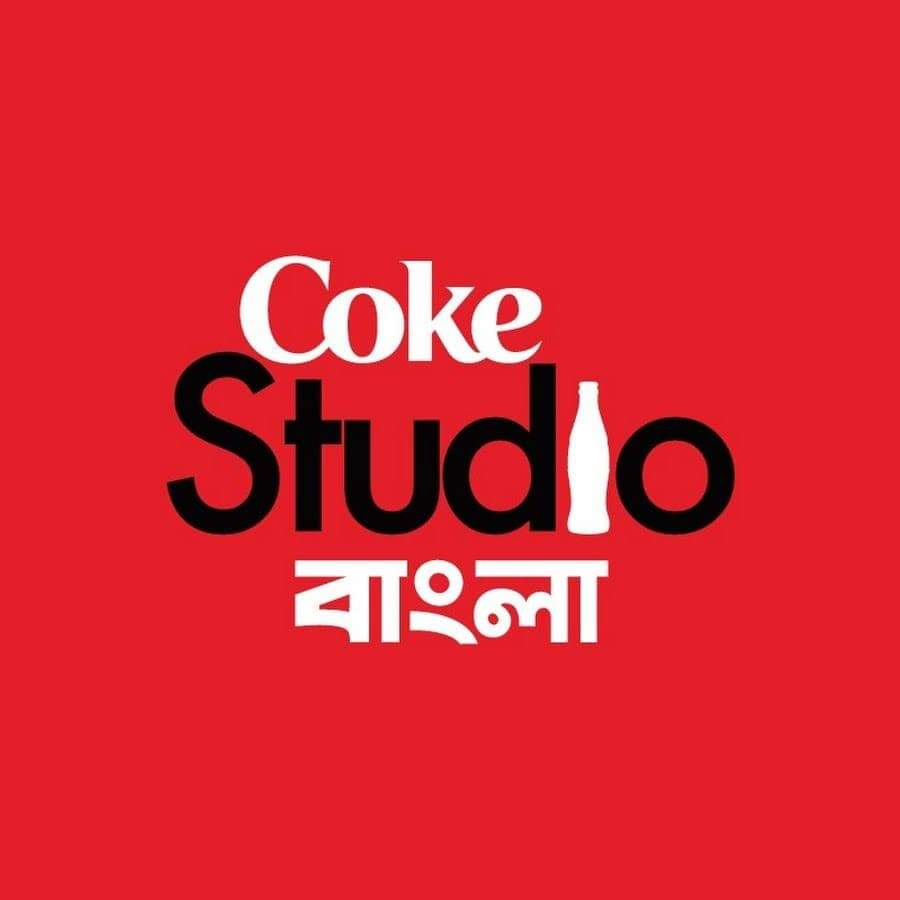
- Starring: Vocalists
- No. of episodes: 8

Release
- Original network: YouTube
- Original release: 23 May 2026 – present

Season chronology
- ← Previous; Season 3

The fourth season of the Bangladeshi music television series Coke Studio Bangla started to air from 23 May 2026. Like the previous seasons, the fourth season is also produced and curated by Shayan Chowdhury Arnob.

== Artists ==
=== Vocalists ===
- Hande Çevgel
- Mustafa İpek
- Mahtim Shakib
- Nusrat Jahan
- Mousumi Dutta
- Masha Islam
- Mohammed Shoeb
- Mukul Mojumder Ishaan
- Sunidhi Nayak
- Meghdol
- Ankan Kumar Roy
- Sanzida Mahmood Nandita

== Production ==
This season was produced by Shayan Chowdhury Arnob. Production starting in May 2026, this season is planned to air 8 songs with musicians participating from the country and abroad.

== Songs ==
No. overall	No. in season	Song Title	Singer(s)	Lyricist(s)	Composer(s)	Original release date
32	1	"Room Jhoom"	Hande Çevgel, Mustafa İpek, Mahtim Shakib, Nusrat Jahan	Ottoman Turkish folk song and Kazi Nazrul Islam	Kazi Nazrul Islam	23 May 2026
With inspiration from the Turkish folk song "Üsküdar'a Gider İken", Kazi Nazrul Islam created the melody of "Room Jhoom" along with other significant songs "Tribhuboner Priyo Muhammad" and "Shukno Patar Nupur Paye" with the same melody. As the monsoon rains chime in the nature of Bangladesh, "Room Jhoom" portrays the rain-soaked city life and quiet remembrance of the unfinished feelings. "Room Jhoom" mashed up with "Üsküdar'a Gider İken", the song which the previous one is inspired from, pays tribute to the national poet ahead of his 127th birthday.
33	2	"Megh"	Mousumi Dutta, Masha Islam, Mohammed Shoeb	Rabindranath Tagore (inspired)	Mohammed Shoeb, Shayan Chowdhury Arnob	28 June 2026
"Megh" is a tribute to the spirit of Ashar, bringing together classical Bengali musical traditions and contemporary sounds. Rooted in the monsoon raag "Mian Ki Malhar" and drawing inspiration from Rabindranath Tagore's literary works, the track explores themes of anticipation, resilience, and renewal long associated with the rainy season in South Asian culture. The arrangement incorporates modern spoken word influences alongside layered instrumentation, making classical music accessible to younger audiences.
34	3	"Patar Bashori"	Mukul Mojumder Ishaan, Sunidhi Nayak	Mukul Mojumder Ishaan, Eleus Hossain	Mukul Mojumder Ishaan	25 July 2026
Written and composed by Mukul Mojumder Ishaan and produced by Adit Rahman, "Patar Bashori" follows the story of a lover pleading to be spared from the enchanting melody of their beloved's flute, exploring the tension between resisting and surrendering to the pull of love. The song is set amid the historic surroundings of Sonargaon, with the accompanying music video's old-world visuals mirroring the track's timeless romance.
35	4	"Mulluk"	Meghdol (Shibu Kumer Shill)	Shibu Kumer Shill	Shibu Kumer Shill	20 August 2026
Every heart holds a vision of a better tomorrow—a world shaped by equality, harmony, and love. Mulluk is a reflection of that dream. It carries the untold story of Bangladesh’s tea workers, whose generations of hard work have helped build the country’s tea industry, while their own hopes and struggles remained largely unheard. Hundred years ago, thousands of tea workers began a long journey, carrying the hope of returning to their Mulluk—the promised land they call home. The journey may have ended, but the dream of a better life continues. Bringing this story to life, Mulluk blends Meghdol’s music and words with the voices of tea workers Ronju Tanti and Ranjit Tati, carrying folk melodies passed down through generations. Because Mulluk is not just a song. It is a story of people who continue to work, hope, and dream of returning to their own land someday.
36	5	"Mothura"	Ankan Kumar Roy & Sanzida Mahmood Nandita	Ankan Kumar Roy	Ankan Kumar Roy	24 September 2026
Some stories end because two people, no matter how deeply they belong to each other, end up walking in different directions. Like two parallel lines, they travel alongside one another but are never meant to meet. Mothura, is simply that feeling. A metaphor for all those great love stories where two souls may have loved deeply but remained incomplete. Stories like Radha-Krishna, Romeo-Juliet, and Layla-Majnun who have their victories celebrated by the world, yet their losses remain buried within their hearts. This incompleteness eternalized them beyond their time. Mothura is an ode to those stories whose emotions became eternal through memory, poetry & music. Written by Ankan, Mothura is brought to life through the voices of Nandita & Ankan himself, with music arrangement by Shuvendu. Together, they turn the pang of separation into an emotion that feels timeless. Because sometimes the most enduring kind of Real Magic is the love that continues to exist, even when the lovers can never meet.

== See also ==
- Coke Studio Bharat season 3
