= Coke Studio Bangla season 2 =

Second television season of Coke Studio Bangla

Coke Studio Bangla
- Season 2
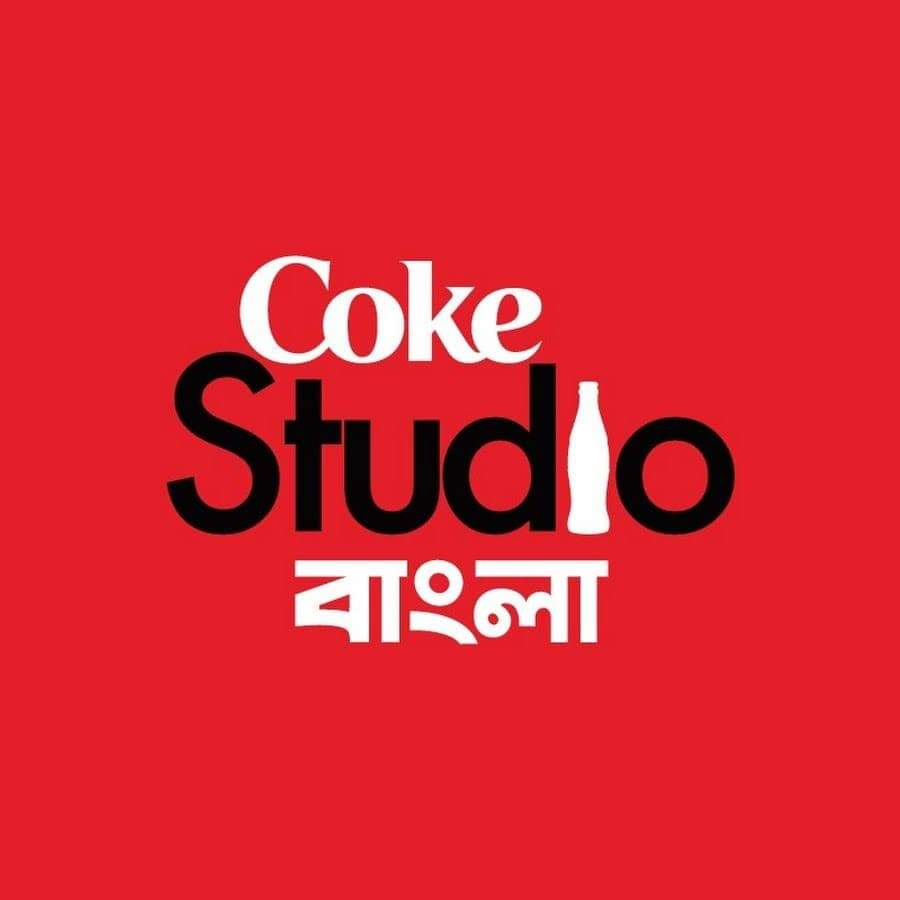
- Starring: Featured artists
- No. of episodes: 12

Release
- Original network: Deepto TV and Webcast
- Original release: 14 February – 9 September 2023

Season chronology
- ← Previous; Season 1 Next → Season 3

The second edition of the Bangladeshi music television series Coke Studio Bangla started airing from 14 February 2023. Like the previous season this season is also produced by Shayan Chowdhury Arnob and distributed by Coca-Cola Bangladesh. Spotify is the official music streaming partner of this season, and Grameenphone being their official teleco partner.

== Featured artists ==
The lineup showcases artists from different regions of Bangladesh.

=== Vocalists ===
- Meghdol
- Mejbaur Rahman
- Mukul Mojumder Ishaan
- Riad Hasan
- Pollob Bhau
- Sanzida Mahmood Nandita
- Shibu Kumer Shill
- Towfique Ahmed
- Sunidhi Nayak

=== Backing vocalists ===
- Jannatul Firdous Akbar
- Rubayat Rehman
- Shanila Islam

=== Musicians ===
- Double Bass: Mohaimin Karim
- Drums: Mazruq Islam (Nafi) & Wadid Mahmood
- Harmonica: Maesha Marium
- Mandolin: Shuvendu Das Shuvo
- Percussions: Mithun Charka & Md. Mobarak Hossain
- Piano & Synth: Pradyut Chatterjea
- Saxophone: Rahin Haider & Sayonton Mangsang
- Trombone: Apurba Mustafa
- Trumpet: Kabil Mia

== Songs ==
All songs were produced by Shayan Chowdhury Arnob.

No. overall	No. in season	Song Title	Singer(s)	Lyricist(s)	Composer(s)	Original release date
12	1	"Murir Tin"	Pollob Vai, Riad Hasan & Towfique Ahmed	Riad Hasan, Pollob Vai & Towfique Ahmed	Shuvendu Das Shuvo (Note: Murir Tin originally written & composed by Riad Hasan)	February 14, 2023
13	2	"Bonobibi"	Jahura Baul & Meghdol	Shibu Kumer Shill, Mejbaur Rahman Sumon & Khonar Bachan (Note: Khonar Bachan: Phrases of Khona' has been collected and adapted from a wide range of Bengali folklore)	Meghdol	March 3, 2023
14	3	"Nahubo"	Animes Roy & Daughter of Coastal	Animes Roy & Daughter of Coastal	Sayonton Mangsang	March 18, 2023
15	4	"Darale Duaarey"	Mukul Mojumder Ishaan & Sanzida Mahmood Nandita	Kazi Nazrul Islam	Shuvendu Das Shuvo (Note: Originally composed by Kazi Nazrul Islam)	April 21, 2023
16	5	"Deora"	Ghaashphoring Choir, Islam Uddin Palakar, Pritom Hasan & Fazlu Majhi	Pritom Hasan & Fazlu Majhi	Pritom Hasan	May 7, 2023
17	6	"Nodir Kul"	Arnob, Idris Rahman & Ripon Kumar Sarkar	Jasimuddin	Arnob (Note: Originally composed by Jasimuddin)	May 25, 2023
18	7	"Kotha Koiyo Na"	Arfan Mredha Shiblu & Aleya Begum	Hashim Mahmod & Maimansingha Gitika	Emon Chowdhury	June 10, 2023
19	8	"Dewana"	Fuad Al Muqtadir, Soumyadeep Murshidabadi, Shuchona Shely & Tasfia Fatima	Pagol Goni Mastan & Srijato	Fuad Al Muqtadi (Note: "Asheqjon" was originally composed by Pagol Goni Mastan)	June 24, 2023
20	9	"Shondhatara"	Arnob, Adit Rahman & Sunidhi Nayak	Divash Krishna Biswas	Ustad Vilayat Hussain Khan	July 8, 2023
21	10	"Ghum Ghum"	Fairooz Nazifa & Shuvendu Das Shuvo	S.M Hedayat	Lucky Akhand	July 23, 2023
22	11	"Anondodhara"	Adity Mohsin & Bappa Mazumder	Rabindranath Tagore	Rabindranath Tagore	August 6, 2023
23	12	"Dilaram"	Arnob & Hamida Banu	Hason Raja	Shamarin Dewan	September 9, 2023
