= Coke Studio Bangla season 3 =

Third television season of Coke Studio Bangla

Coke Studio Bangla
- Season 3
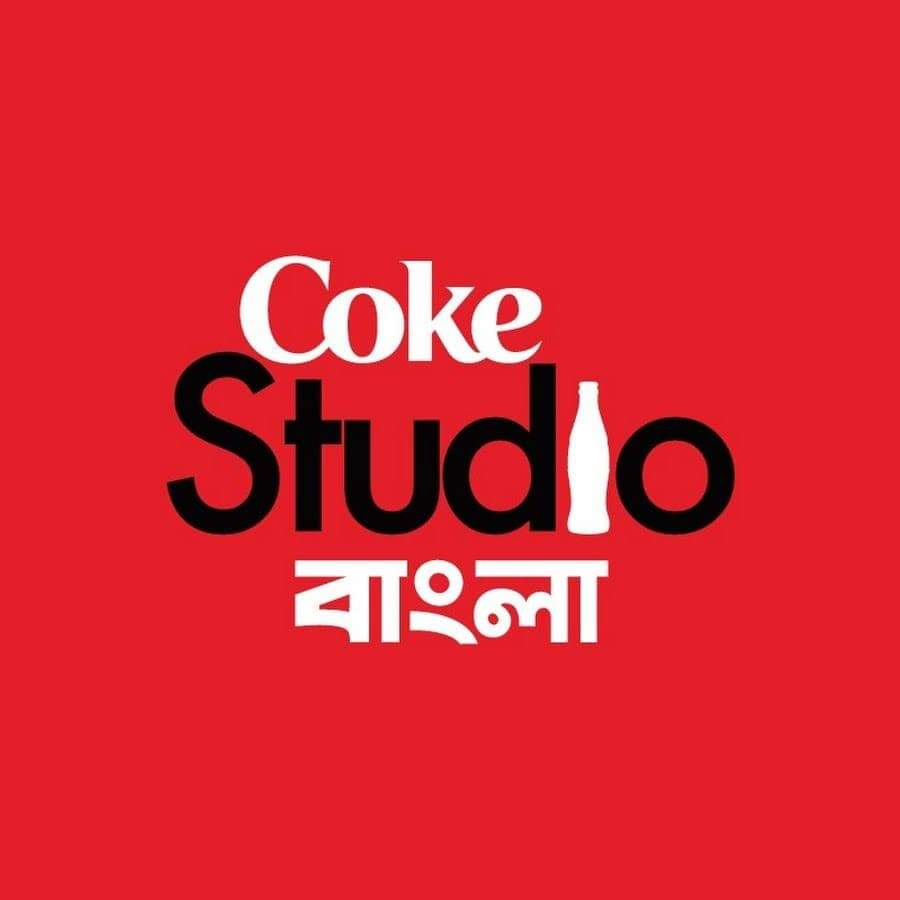
- Starring: Vocalists
- No. of episodes: 8

Release
- Original network: YouTube
- Original release: April 13, 2024 – November 16, 2025

Season chronology
- ← Previous; Season 2 Next → Season 4

The third season of the Bangladeshi music television series Coke Studio Bangla started airing from 13 April 2024. The season curated is by Shayan Chowdhury Arnob.

== Artists ==
=== Vocalists ===
- Aly Hasan
- Arnob
- Jaya Ahsan
- Md. Arif Dewan
- Md. Gonjer Ali
- Oli Boy
- Shorfuddin Dewan (Sagor)
- Warfaze
- Emon Chowdhury
- Ankan Kumar Roy
- Sheikh Mumtahina Mehzabin Afrin
- Habib Wahid
- Mehrnigori Rustam
- Lívia Mattos
- Tanzir Tuhin
- Gaurab Chatterjee
- Runa Laila

== Production ==
Shayan Chowdhury Arnob served as the music curator for the season, collaborating with fellow music producers Pritom Hasan, Emon Chowdhury, Shuvendu Das Shuvo, and others. The show featured eight songs, featuring contributions from over 180 musicians and vocalists from Bangladesh and around the globe.

Production for the show was undertaken by Dotbirth Limited. Deepto Television served as the television media partner, while Qinetic Music handled digital distribution. TikTok served as the entertainment partner. Dope Productions and Runout Films were responsible for the show's visual presentation. Commenting on the third season, Arnob, expressed,

We are excited to commence yet another voyage of musical excellence and cultural festivity. This season is poised to exemplify our dedication to innovation and ingenuity, as we extend the frontiers of music and narrative even more. From classical tunes to modern rhythms, Coke Studio Bangla Season 3 pledges to be a tribute to artistic variety and imaginative expression.

— Shayan Chowdhury Arnob, the Music Curator of the season

== Songs ==
No. overall	No. in season	Song Title	Singer(s)	Lyricist(s)	Composer(s)	Original release date
24	1	"Tati"	Arnob, Jaya Ahsan, Md. Gonjer Ali & Oli Boy	Oli Boy, Md. Gonjer Ali & Shatarupa Thakurta Roy	Shayan Chowdhury Arnob	April 13, 2024
The song "Tati" features lyrics written by Md. Gonjer Ali for "Gayer Bodhu," Shatarupa Thakurta Roy for "Hana di Reshomer Bone," and Oli Boy for "Time to Giger." Additionally, "Jamdani Weaving Buli" was collected by Chandra Shekhar Shaha. Faizan R Ahmad (Buno) served as the Chief Sound Engineer, with mixing and mastering handled by Saadul Islam.
25	2	"Ma Lo Ma"	Aly Hasan, Arif Dewan, Pritom Hasan & Shagor Dewan	Aly Hasan, Baul Rashid Uddin & Md. Khalek Dewan	Pritom Hasan	May 3, 2024
The song "Ma Lo Ma" features music composed, arranged, and produced by Pritom Hasan, lyrics by Md. Khalek Dewan (with an alternate version by Baul Rashid Uddin titled "Ma Go Ma"), rap verses by Aly Hasan, and a folk song collection by Kalir Noyon Jole. The sound engineering was overseen by Faizan R Ahmad (Buno), with mixing and mastering by Pritom Hasan.
26	3	"Obak Bhalobasha"	Babna Karim (Ex-Warfaze) & Palash Noor	Babna Karim	Warfaze with Coke Studio Bangla Team	May 25, 2024
The song "Obak Bhalobasha" as part of Warfaze's Ruby Jubilee features
27	4	"Baaji"	Emon Chowdhury	Hashim Mahmud	Shayan Chowdhury Arnob	23 August 2025
Urban poet and lyricist Hashim Mahmud is making a much-anticipated comeback with his new song 'Baaji'.
28	5	"Long Distance Love"	Ankan Kumar Roy & Sheikh Mumtahina Mehzabin Afrin	Ankan Kumar Roy	Shuvendu Das Shuvo	11 September 2025
In a world where voices cross oceans in seconds and connection is only a click away, Long Distance Love still finds a way to test the heart. Silence lingers, words remain unsaid, and miles exist without measure. This song captures that quiet void, the echo of waiting, the ache of being near yet apart. From the soulful composition of Shuvendu Das Shuvo and the heartfelt words of Ankan, it drifts through the spaces technology cannot fill, like unsent letters carried by the wind. It's a reminder of the Real Magic that survives beyond closeness and absence, the kind of love that lingers in whispers, memories, and stars too far to hold, yet too close to forget.
29	6	"Moha Jadu"	Habib Wahid & Mehrnigori Rustam	Baul Shah Khoyaj Mia, Syed Gousul Alam Shaon, Hadis Deghan (Farsi)	Habib Wahid	25 September 2025
Mesmerizing Bangla mysticism, where love becomes a force that moves the heart and pulls the soul like an unseen thread. Moha Jadu celebrates this love's enchantment. Penned by the mystical poet Khoyaj Mia, a disciple of the revered mystic guide Durbin Shah, the song was born out of surrender, a seeker's devotion to his murshid. Habib Wahid's modern reinterpretation, gives these timeless verses a fresh rhythm, vibrant, upbeat, and captivating. Wrapped in melodies, it bridges time and culture, speaks of longing and surrender, and transcends unseen borders. It carries with it both the Real Magic of old mystic verses and the voice of a new generation listening in.
30	7	"Café"	Tanzir Tuhin, Lívia Mattos, Gaurab Chatterjee	Robert Gueits and Eddie Palmier, Gautam Chattopadhyay (Moheener Ghoraguli)	Shuvendu Das Shuvo	25 October 2025
There's something about a Café that turns ordinary days into stories. Each table here tells its own tale: a first hello, a last goodbye, and the gentle pause between two hearts learning what silence means. People come and go here, yet something always stays. Somewhere in that timeless hush, the soul of Café was born. Tuhin's stirring vocals, joined by Shuvendu's heartfelt harmony, bring the song to life. Gaboo, carrying the legacy of rhythm, and Lívia's magical accordion melody complete a symphony of musical warmth. A journey tracing its roots back to the soulful verses of Eddie Palmieri and Moheener Ghoraguli. It's a fusion of Bangla nostalgia and Latin Jazz, it's not just a song, but an emotion living between heartbeats and nostalgia, where life unfolds its Real Magic one moment at a time.
31	8	"Mast Qalandar"	Runa Laila	Amir Khusrau, Bulleh Shah, Hason Raja	Shayan Chowdhury Arnob, Adit Rahman	16 November 2025
The song is a rendition of popular sufi qawwali Dama Dam Mast Qalandar with additional verses from Bangla spiritual folk song "Doya Koro Bondhu" by Hason Raja. Sung by Runa Laila, the music was arranged and produced by Shayan Chowdhury Arnob and Adit Rahman.

== See also ==
- Coke Studio Bharat season 2
- Coke Studio Tamil season 2
- Coke Studio Pakistan season 15
