= Barin Mazumder =

Bangladeshi classical musician

- বারীণ মজুমদার
- Born: 15 February 1921; Radhanagar, Pabna, Bengal Presidency, British India
- Died: 3 October 2001 (aged 80); Dhaka, Bangladesh
- Spouse: Ila Majumder (m. 1960)
- Children: Partha Pratim Majumder; Partha Sharothi Mazumder; Bappa Mazumder

Barin Mazumder (15 February 1921 – 3 October 2001) was a Bangladeshi classical musician and educationist. He was awarded Ekushey Padak in 1983 by the Government of Bangladesh.

== Early life ==
Mazumder was born into a kayastha Jamindar family at Radhanagar in Pabna District. His father Nishendra Mazumder was an artist and dramatist. His mother used to play sitar.

To nurture his interest in music his father took him to Kolkata where he first learned music from Vishmadev Chatterjee. The first Raag that he learned was “Raag Bhupali”. Two years later when his guru became shonnasi he came back to Pabna, but Mazumder was not satisfied and wanted to go to Lucknow to study music in Maurice Music School. But his uncle who was the patriarch (korta) of the family did not allow him to go. Instead, he brought Ustad Roghurangan Gushwami from Lucknow to teach him music at home. At home, he managed to finish the Maurice College course, but his desire to go to Lucknow made him decide to leave home.

When he reached Lucknow, some Bengali boys helped to take him to the Bengali hotel. At the time, Uday Shankar and Ravi Shankar were also in that hotel. At the college, he met with his friend and fellow musician Chinmoy Lahiri. Lahiri took him to the principal of the Maurice Music School and he was admitted into the third year. Lahiri taught him music beside college classes. Later, Mazumder was attracted o Foiaz Khan and became his novice.

One day when he was in a debate about a topic with Sunil, suddenly Sunil said that Mazumder could not sing. This seemed to be the turning point of his career as he challenged him and said he would become better than him in three months. After that, he continued with his rewaz (musical practice) and soon his song was faster than Sunil's. Then one day as Sunil was in a show he went and performed the Raag of Sunil faster and this made Sunil understand his fault. As he continued to prepare him for music the time of partition came closer. During that time the fees that came from home stopped and he had to struggle hard to even manage the money to return home. He mortgaged his favorite tanpura and returned to Pabna during that very turbulent period.

== Career ==
Majumder came to Dhaka in 1957 and joined as a professor of Classical Music in Bulbul Lalitakala Academy. In 1963, he decided to establish a college of music with 75 taka. He performed classical music on Bangladesh Television since 1965. He had incorporated Music College into University of Dhaka and served as a Chairman of the Examination Body concerning music of Dhaka University till 1977.

After the partition of India when most of his neighbors had to cross the border, he stayed for the love of his homeland, but the riches and wealth which were made over the generations were mostly looted and hunted by the miscreants. The real admirer of his talent was also nowhere to be seen as he had not had the opportunity. The toughness and loneliness at that time made him frustrated and depressed.

With most of his family property long gone Mazumder had to work hard. He once even bought a camera and related equipment to run a photography business, but soon lost interest and left the business. Fighting with severe frustration and depression, Mazumder had to pass his time only with his favorite hunting. He was really fond of hunting, and according to his wife Ila Mazumder, his story would not be completed if it does not include a lot of things about his hunting.

== Personal life ==
Mazumder was married to Ila Majumder, a classical musician. They lost their child Modhumita Majumdar in a war in 1971. They were never able to find her after she went missing. They had three sons, Partha Pratim Mojumdar (whom they adopted), Partha Sharothi Mojumdar and Bappa Mazumder.

== Awards ==
- Tamgha-e-Imtiaz (1970)
- Ekushey Padak (1983)
- Shidhu Bhai Memorial Award (1988)
- Rabindra Award (1993)
- Best Performer Award (1995)
- Fellowship of Bangla Academy (1997)
- Janakantha Pioneer Award (1998)
- the Liberation Award (2001)
