= Ila Majumder =

Bangladeshi classical vocalist

- Born: 9 September 1941; Pabna District, Bengal Presidency, British India
- Died: 3 May 2011 (aged 69); Dhaka, Bangladesh
- Spouse: Barin Mazumder (m. 1960; died 2000)
- Children: Partha Pratim Majumder; Partha Sharothi Mazumder; Bappa Mazumder

Ila Majumder (9 September 1941 — 3 May 2011) was a Bangladeshi classical vocalist. Bangladesh Shilpakala Academy awarded her for the special contribution in the field of culture. She was the spouse of the classical musician of Barin Mazumder.

== Early life and career ==
Majumder had been taught on music by her future husband Barin Mazumder since 1954. She completed her master's in philosophy in 1961. She had served as a teacher in the Willes Little Flower School during 1981–2003. She also served as a part-time teacher in the National Music College for 15 years.

Majumder was the mother of musician Bappa Mazumder, music composer Partha Sharothi Mojumdar and mime artist Partha Pratim Majumder.

== Works ==
- Smritite Srutite Barin Majumder
- Dinguli Mor
- Sangiter Tattakatha
