= Sunidhi Nayak =

Indian singer and actress

Sunidhi Nayak সুনিধি নায়েক
- Born: Asansol, West Bengal, India
- Origin: India
- Education: Visva-Bharati University
- Genres: Rabindra Sangeet; Classical; Bengali folk
- Occupations: Singer; actress
- Years active: 2019–present
- Spouse: Shayan Chowdhury Arnob (m. 2020)

Sunidhi Nayak is an Indian singer and actress. She is known for her work as a vocalist on Coke Studio Bangla and for her film debut in the 2026 Bangladeshi film Rockstar. She has released several solo singles and EPs, and has performed internationally with her husband, musician Shayan Chowdhury Arnob.

== Early life and education ==
Nayak was born and raised in Asansol, West Bengal, India. She began training in music from an early age under Pandit Ajoy Chakraborty, crediting him with her grounding in musical grammar, scales and notation. She later studied at Visva-Bharati University in Santiniketan, where she trained formally in Rabindra Sangeet.

== Career ==
=== Music ===
Nayak became known in Bangladesh as a Rabindra Sangeet vocalist and joined Coke Studio Bangla during its first season, contributing to the song "Hey Samalo" (2022) alongside Bappa Mazumder, Samina Chowdhury, Shayan Chowdhury Arnob and others. In season 2, she performed a duet with Arnob on "Shondhatara" (2023), a Bengali adaptation of the Bandish "Main Waari Waari Jaungi" set to raag Emon, produced and composed by Adit Rahman. In 2026, she returned for Season 4 to perform "Patar Bashori" as a duet with Ishaan.

Beyond Coke Studio Bangla, Nayak has released a number of solo singles, including "O Je Mane Na" (2024), "Abegi Prem" (2024), "Brishti Bheja Matha" (2024), "Shei Harano Sur" (2024) and the EP Arale (2024), as well as "Palabe Kothay" and "Jodi Tare" (2025).

She has also performed internationally, including a concert in Toronto, Canada, in August 2026, alongside Arnob and his band members.

=== Acting ===
Nayak made her screen debut in Ashroy (2019), followed by Adhkhana Bhalo Chele Adha Mostaan (2021). In 2026, she made her feature film breakthrough in Rockstar, where she played a character named Sunidhi. Following the film's release, she was noted for a Rabindra Sangeet recital performed during a post-film interview.

== Personal life ==
Nayak is married to Bangladeshi musician and Coke Studio Bangla curator Shayan Chowdhury Arnob. The couple married in October 2020 in Kolkata.

In September 2024, Nayak filed a cyber fraud complaint with Shantiniketan Police Station in West Bengal, alleging that she had been threatened by scammers posing as CBI agents who demanded ₹5 lakhs and threatened to distribute her photos on the dark web. The police launched an investigation into the matter.

== Discography ==
=== Singles ===
- "O Je Mane Na" (2024)
- "Abegi Prem" (2024)
- "Brishti Bheja Matha" (2024)
- "Shei Harano Sur" (2024)
- "Arale Theko" (2024)
- "Palabe Kothay" (2025)
- "Jodi Tare" (2025)

=== EPs ===
- Arale (2024)

=== Coke Studio Bangla appearances ===
- "Hey Samalo" (Season 1, 2022)
- "Shondhatara" (Season 2, 2023)
- "Mast Qalandar" (Season 3, 2025)
- "Patar Bashori" (Season 4, 2026)

== Filmography ==
Year	Title	Role	Notes
2019	Ashroy		Screen debut
2021	Adhkhana Bhalo Chele Adha Mostaan		
2026	Rockstar	Sunidhi	Feature film debut
