= Dalchhut =

Bangladeshi pop rock band

Dalchhut দলছুট
- Origin: Dhaka, Bangladesh
- Genres: Pop
- Years active: 1996–2013, 2016–present
- Members: Bappa Mazumder; Wahidur Rahman Masum; Sohel Aziz; John Sutton Munshi; Sheikh Imran Ahmed Dano
- Past members: Sanjeeb Choudhury; Hossain Towhidur Rahman Rumi; Raquibun Nabi Ratul; Koshrose Mohit; Naimul Hasan Tanim; Shamim Alam Bulet

Dalchhut is a Bangladeshi pop rock band formed by Bappa Mazumder and Sanjeeb Choudhury in Dhaka in 1996.

== History ==
In 1997, Dalchhut released their first album Ah.

In 2000, Dalchhut released their second album Hridoypur.

In 2002, Dalchhut released their third album Akash Churi.

In 2007, Dalchhut released their fourth album Jochona Bihar.

In 2008, Dalchhut released their fifth album Tukro Kotha.

In 2010, Dalchhut released their sixth album Ei Amontron.

In 2024, Dalchhut released their seventh album Sanjeeb.

== Discography ==
- Ah (1997)
- Hridoypur (2000)
- Akash Churi (2002)
- Jochona Bihar (2007)
- Tukro Kotha (2008)
- Ei Amontron (2010)
- Sanjeeb (2024)

== Members ==
Present members

- Bappa Mazumder – vocals, lead guitars (1996–2013, 2016–present)
- Wahidur Rahman Masum – lead guitars (2016–present)
- Sohel Aziz – keyboards (2016–present)
- John Sutton Munshi – bass guitar (2016–present)
- Sheikh Imran Ahmed Dano – drums (2016–present)

Past members

- Sanjeeb Choudhury (died 2007) – vocals (1996–2007)
- Hossain Towhidur Rahman Rumi – drums (2002–2007)
- Raquibun Nabi Ratul – bass guitar (2002–2007)
- Koshrose Mohit – percussions, drums (2003–2013)
- Shamim Alam Bulet – keyboards (2004–2013)
- Naimul Hasan Tanim – bass guitar (2009–2013)
