= Hasan Robayet =

Bangladeshi poet

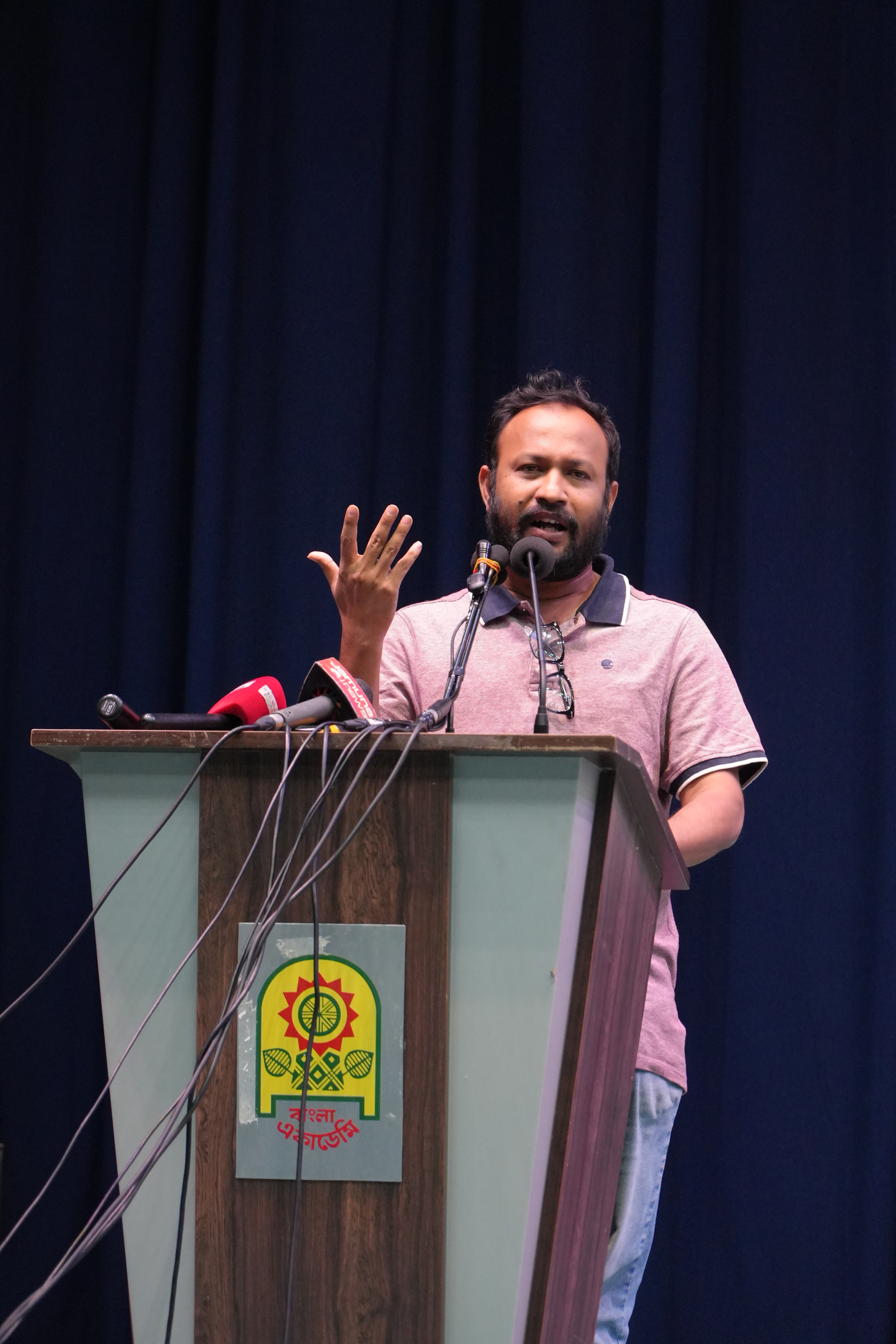
- Robayet speaking at a workshop organised by Revolution's Watch at Bangla Academy
- Born: 19 August 1989 (age 37); Bogra District, Bangladesh
- Education: University of Dhaka
- Occupations: Poet, lyricist
- Notable work: Musolmaner Chhele (2022); Chhayakarbala (2024)

Hasan Robayet (born 19 August 1989) is a Bangladeshi poet and lyricist. He has published several collections of poetry since 2016, and his poem Sinthi was included in a seventh-grade Bengali-language textbook in Bangladesh in 2025.

== Early life and education ==
Robayet was born on 19 August 1989 in Bogra District, Bangladesh. He studied mathematics at the University of Dhaka.

== Career ==
Robayet's first poetry collection, Ghumanto Mercury Fuley, was published by Chaitanya in 2016. He subsequently published several further collections, including Meengondher Tara and Emon Ghonghor Fashibade, both in 2018, the latter of which was reissued by Dhakaprokash in a later edition. His collection Amra Kotha Boli Kenona Nirobota Fascistder Bhasha was published at the 2025 Ekushey Book Fair.

Robayet's poetry has appeared in Prothom Alo's literary pages.

In 2026, he wrote the lyrics for the song "Piriti", featured in the film Rockstar starring Shakib Khan.

=== Inclusion in school curriculum ===
In 2025, Robayet's poem Sinthi was included in Saptaborna, a seventh-grade Bengali-language textbook, as part of a curriculum revision carried out by the National Curriculum and Textbook Board following the change of government in August 2024.

=== Literary themes ===
In a 2026 interview with The Deltagram, Robayet said that he began writing poetry seriously towards the end of 2012, and that the political developments in Bangladesh during the following years naturally influenced his writing. He also said that his poetry explores the lives of ordinary people, history, identity and culture, including Muslim cultural identity in Bangladesh.

Several lines from Robayet's poetry are displayed on an exterior wall of the July Uprising Memorial Museum in Dhaka.

Lines from a poem by Hasan Robayet displayed on a wall at the July Uprising Memorial Museum

Tomra hoyto jaiba bhule Khuni Hasinar itihash Shei maye rakhbo mone Je chhuinche polar lash.

== Critical reception ==
Reviewing Robayet's 2020 collection Madhudangatire in New Age (Bangladesh), poet and academic Abdullah Al Muktadir described the book's thirty-eight untitled poems as evoking a timeless, geographically unfixed quality, and argued that despite an initially musical or seemingly conventional surface, the poems reveal philosophical depth on closer reading. The review characterised Robayet as an experimental and modern poet rather than a romantic one, and praised his use of rhyme as a distinguishing strength at a time when many contemporary poets avoid it.

== Bibliography ==
Year	Title	Genre	Publisher
2016	Ghumanto Mercury Fuley	Poetry	Chaitanya
2018	Meengondher Tara	Poetry	Zebracrossing
2018	Anokha Nadi	Poetry	Tobuo Proyash
2018	Emon Ghonghor Fashibade	Poetry	Dhakaprokash
2020	Madhudangatire	Poetry	Oitijjhya
2021	Taradhulipath	Poetry	Oitijjhya
2022	Musolmaner Chhele	Poetry	Oitijjhya
2023	Kusum Tar Sobtuku Jane	Poetry	Boivob
2025	Amra Kotha Boli Kenona Nirobota Fascistder Bhasha	Poetry	—

Compiled from publisher listings (see reference above under Early life and education).
