= Sanjeeb Choudhury =

Bangladeshi musician, writer and activist (1964-2007)

- সঞ্জীব চৌধুরী
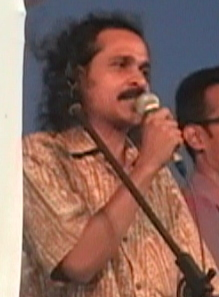
- Choudhury performing for Dalchhut
- Born: 25 December 1964; Baniachang, Habiganj, East Pakistan
- Died: 19 November 2007 (aged 42); Dhaka, Bangladesh
- Education: MSc
- Alma mater: University of Dhaka
- Occupations: Singer-songwriter, journalist, writer, poet and political activist
- Years active: 1996–2007
- Spouse: Progga Nasrin Shilpi
- Children: 1

Sanjeeb Choudhury (25 December 1964 – 19 November 2007) was a Bangladeshi singer-songwriter, writer, journalist and political activist. He was one of the two leading members of the Bengali band Dalchhut with Bappa Mazumder and was the composer for Dalchhut's four albums. He was also a journalist and worked for the newspaper Ajker Kagoj, Bhorer Kagoj, and Jaijaidin. He was an activist during the mass upsurge against the autocratic regime of Hossain Mohammad Ershad.

== Early life and career ==
Choudhury was born at Baniachong Upazila in Habiganj on 25 December 1964. He graduated from the journalism department of Dhaka University and organised various cultural programs and taught his classmates how to sing during his time at the university. During the mass upsurge against Hossain Mohammad Ershad his poems gained popularity as he was known to his Dhaka University colleagues as Sanjeebda or Brother Sanjeeb. He initially sang at a band group named Shongkhochil.

During the mid 1990s he and Bappa Mazumder formed their band Dalchhut which within a short time gained popularity. In 1996, Dalchhut released their first album Ahh. The duet song in the album Shada Moila Rongila Pale become an instant hit. Dalchhut's second album was Hridoypur (2000), which happened to be their most popular album. In the album, Bappa and Sanjeeb sang the song Gari Chole Na of Shah Abdul Karim which was shown on Ittadi. Choudhury's solo Ami Tomakei Bole Debo was another song of that album. In Dalchhut's third album Aakaashchuri (2002), folk tuned song Bioscope was again shown on Ittadi and became famous. Sanjeeb's solo album Swapnobaji was released in 2005. In 2007, Dalchhut's final album Jochhnabihar (2007) was released after a long break. Sanjeeb wrote the title song Jochhnabihar and tuned and sang some others.

=== Journalism and political views ===
Sanjeeb Choudhury was a Bangladesh Students' Union activist. During his intermediate study in Dhaka College he involved with this leftist student political organization and during his undergraduate study in Dhaka University he was cultural secretary of central committee of Bangladesh Students'Union. After his graduation from the journalism department of Dhaka University, Choudhury worked in a number of dailies. He started off at Ajker Kagoj and later joined Bhorer Kagoj and established himself as a feature writer. He was the departmental editor of Mela which was a popular supplement of the paper. Subsequently, he became the editor of Istikutum and Pathok Forum which brought the readers of the newspaper to a place where they had the chance to express their views. He taught and trained many young journalists and run many workshops. He also worked in Jaijaidin for a while.

== Personal life ==
He is the son of Gopal Chowdhury and Provashini Chowdhury. Out of 9 siblings, he is the seventh child. Choudhury was married to Progga Nasrin Shilpi. They have one daughter named Kingbodonti.

== Death ==
On 19 November 2007, at the age of 42, Choudhury died from brain hemorrhage at the Intensive Care Unit of Apollo Hospital in Dhaka after a sudden sickness on 15 November 2007. He was a humanist philosopher and donated his body for research to the Anatomy Department of Dhaka Medical College.

== Honors ==
After his death department of Mass Communication and Journalism of the University of Dhaka started a scholarship program named Sanjeeb Chowdhury Scholarship for the students who did outstanding academic result.
