= Rockstar (2026 film) =

- Film poster
- Directed by: Azman Rusho
- Screenplay by: Nusraat Mati
- Dialogue: Ayman Asib Shadhin; Samiul Bhuiyan
- Story by: Azman Rusho
- Produced by: Anjan Chowdhury Pintu
- Starring: Shakib Khan; Sabila Nur; Tangia Zaman Methila; Sunidhi Nayak
- Cinematography: Abdul Mamun
- Edited by: Anis Masud
- Music by: Ahmed Hassan Sunny; Jahid Nirob
- Production company: Sun Motion Pictures Limited
- Distributed by: Swapno Scarecrow (United States, Canada and United Kingdom)
- Release date: May 28, 2026 (Bangladesh)
- Running time: 147 minutes
- Country: Bangladesh
- Language: Bangla
- Box office: ৳3.1 crore (US$250,000)

Rockstar is a 2026 Bangladeshi romantic musical drama film directed by Azman Rusho in his theatrical debut and produced by Anjan Chowdhury Pintu under the banner of Sun Motion Pictures Limited. The film features Shakib Khan, Sabila Nur, Tangia Zaman Methila and Sunidhi Nayak in lead roles.

The film was released on 28 May 2026 on the occasion of Eid-ul-Adha in Bangladesh. It received mixed to negative reviews.

== Plot ==
Agun is the only son of famous classical legend Ustad Junaid. Everyone expects him to continue his father's classical legacy, but Agun's heart beats for rock music — guitars, drums, and stadium crowds. This creates constant conflict with his father at home. He leaves his father's shadow and starts struggling as a small-town independent musician with his childhood love Mira by his side. Mira believes in him more than anyone, she listens to his unfinished songs, manages his small shows and pushes him to write his own original tracks.

One day, at a college cultural fest, Agun gets a chance to perform when the main singer doesn't show up. He sings his own rock number with full energy. Someone records it and the video goes viral overnight. The next morning, Agun's face is on big commercial billboards — a music company signs him as their new Rockstar.

Fame comes too fast. He goes from small tea-stall jamming to sold-out concerts, TV interviews, and brand deals. But the commercial music industry is not what he imagined. Producers want him to sing commercial, auto-tuned songs, not his soulful rock. There is pressure to make hits, jealousy from other artists, and greed from the label.

In this chaos, he loses Mira. She feels left out of his new glittery world and slowly disappears from his life after a fight about him changing. This breakup breaks Agun completely.

Lonely at the top, Agun slowly falls into addiction — alcohol, late-night parties, and anger issues. He starts misbehaving on stage, fighting with his band and his father. He loses control, cancels shows, and his career starts crashing. The media that once praised him now calls him a "washed-up star."

The climax shows a completely isolated Agun — rich and famous, but sitting alone in a big apartment with no music, no Mira, no father. In the end, he realizes that real rockstar life is not about fame, but about the music and the people who loved him before fame. He goes back to his roots, picks up his guitar again and tries to find Mira and his original voice.

== Cast ==
- Shakib Khan as Agun
  - Shayan Mirza as teenage Agun
- Sabila Nur as Meera, Agun's love interest and after wife
- Tangia Zaman Methila as Elena, a supermodel
- Sunidhi Nayak as Sunidhi
- Pantha Kanai as Imprisoned musician
- Tariq Anam Khan as Ustad Junayed, Agun's father
- Rosey Siddique as Shabnam, Agun's mother
- Dilara Zaman as Agun's grandmother
- Kazi Sabir as Aslam, Agun's manager and friend
- Mahdiyah Mahrusha
- Bhuvan Gagan
- Asad Sattar
- Tanmoy Parvez
- Khalid Ashraf
- Ekramul Haque Khan Shanto
- Anisul Islam Bobby
- Ulka Hossain
- Sneha Baul
- Sayem Samad
- Mohammad Mohiuddin Saifullah
- Shafat Chowdhury Robi
- Raiyan "Dio" Sarwar
- Jacob Berlin

== Production ==
=== Development ===
Rockstar is the second collaboration between Shakib Khan and Sun Motion Pictures Limited, following the unreleased film Soldier. Director Azman Rusho said the initial idea came from Khan, who wanted to play such a role. The screenplay was written by Nusraat Mati, with dialogue by Ayman Asib Swadhin and Samiul Bhuiyan. Cinematography was by Abdul Mamun, who previously worked on Kaiser (2022), Pett Kata Shaw (2022), and Dui Shaw (2025). Editing was by Anis Masud. The songs were written and composed by Ahmed Hasan Sunny, while Jahid Nirob handled music direction and background score.

Costume designer Safia Sathi worked on Shakib Khan's costumes, having previously worked with him on a television commercial directed by Adnan Al Rajeev. Indian makeup artist Amit Ambarkar joined the film for character makeup and transformation. It was his third collaboration with Khan, following Borbaad (2025) and Prince: Once Upon a Time in Dhaka (2026).

=== Casting ===
Mohit Tanmoy served as the film's casting director and was responsible for casting sports presenter Kazi Sabir in the film. Shakib Khan officially signed on to the project on 6 October 2025. Tangia Zaman Methila was cast as the female lead in February 2026. Although reports circulated that a Pakistani actress would portray the second female lead, the claim was later dismissed by the director. The role eventually went to Sabila Nur, marking her second collaboration with Khan following the success of Taandob in 2025.

In late March, renowned Bangladeshi musician Pantha Kanai confirmed his involvement in the film in a significant role, marking his second screen appearance following Fatima (2024). Tariq Anam Khan and Rosey Siddiqui were also reported to have been cast as the parents of Khan's character.

=== Filming ===
Principal photography began in Malaysia on 24 March 2026. On 1 April, Shakib Khan returned to Bangladesh after completing the first filming schedule to participate in the promotional campaign for Prince: Once Upon a Time in Dhaka (2026). Following the first phase of filming in mid-April, the cast and crew returned to Bangladesh and continued filming in multiple location in Dhaka. On 2 May, following the release of the film's pre-teaser, the director stated that the director informed the media that the final stage of filming was in progress in Tongi, Gazipur.

== Themes and influences ==
Director Azman Russo revealed that he drew inspiration for Rockstar from the lives of real-life rockstars as well as his personal experiences as a musician in the music industry. The film presents Shakib Khan in the role of a musician, exploring the challenges, successes, setbacks and ambitions associated with his musical journey, rather than depicting him in the conventional roles of an action hero or gangster.

In another interview, the director attributed that the concept for Rockstar came from Khan, who had approached him with an interest in portraying a character of this kind. The film's story was subsequently developed around the idea. The director described it as "the story of a rockstar's life, encompassing family, love and tragedy, and ultimately portraying life itself."

== Music ==
Rockstar

Soundtrack album by Ahmed Hassan Sunny
- Released: May 12, 2026
- Recorded: 2026
- Studio: Sound of Silence
- Genre: Feature Film Soundtrack
- Language: Bengali
- Labels: SVF Music; Chorki; Billing Music
- Producer: Jahid Nirob

Ahmed Hassan Sunny chronology
Ekhane Rajnoitik Alaap Joruri (2026)	Rockstar (2026)	TBA (TBA)

The film's soundtrack was composed by Ahmed Hasan Sunny, while Jahid Nirob served as the music director. In an interview with The Daily Star, Sunny revealed that Rockstar contains between eight and ten tracks. SVF Entertainment and Alpha-i collaborated on the film's music production. All songs from the film are set to be released through the official YouTube channel of SVF Music–Chorki–Biling Music.

The first single from the film, "Piriti", was released on 12 May 2026. Written by Hasan Robayet and sung by Pantha Kanai, it marked the beginning of the film's soundtrack campaign. The second single, "Amake Uriye Dao", was released on 24 May and was written, composed, and performed by Ahmed Hasan Sunny.

No.	Title	Lyrics	Music	Singer(s)	Length
1.	"Piriti"	Hasan Robayet	Ahmed Hasan Sunny	Pantha Kanai	03:52
2.	"Amake Uriye Dao"	Ahmed Hasan Sunny	Ahmed Hasan Sunny	Ahmed Hasan Sunny	04:41
3.	"Ami Jabo Hariye"	Ankan Kumar	Jahid Nirob	Ankan Kumar	3:30
4.	"Besh Kichudin"	Ahmed Hasan Sunny	Ahmed Hasan Sunny	Ahmed Hasan Sunny	03:52

== Marketing ==
The first promotional poster of Rockstar was released on 28 March 2026 to coincide with Khan's 47 birthday. A second poster was unveiled on 16 April, featuring both Khan and Sabila Nur. On 2 May, the film's animated pre-teaser, titled "Warm Up", was released, announcing the forthcoming release of the official teaser. The teaser was released on 5 May, followed by "Teaser 2: Flower" on 20 May, which had been announced at the end of the first teaser.

Rockstar became the first Bangladeshi film to release an animated teaser. On 20 April, during the Bangladesh–New Zealand series, the film's first look was showcased on the scoreboard of Sher-e-Bangla National Cricket Stadium and broadcast on T Sports and Nagorik TV. The teaser was later broadcast on the same channels during the Bangladesh–Pakistan Test series on 8 May. The film was additionally promoted through a concert held in Pabna in April.

== Release ==
Rockstar received an uncut "U" (Universal) certificate from the Bangladesh Film Certification Board. The film was released in 103 theatres on 28 May 2026, coinciding with Eid al-Adha.

International distribution rights for the film in the United States, Canada, and the United Kingdom were handled by Swapno Scarecrow. Following its theatrical release, the film's digital streaming rights were acquired by Chorki. On 5 June 2026, the film was released in 41 cinemas across Canada, the United States, and the United Kingdom.

An enhanced cut of the film, with a runtime eight minutes shorter than the theatrical version, was released on the OTT platform Chorki on July 23, 2026.

== Reception ==
=== Box office ===
Although Bangladesh does not have an official box-office tracking system, Bangla Tribune reported that the film had grossed ৳1.34 crore from multiplexes alone by the end its third day of release.

=== Critical response ===
Rockstar received widely mixed responses from audiences and critics. While Shakib Khan's performance and screen presentation were generally well received, the film attracted criticism for its story and screenplay, with several commentators highlighting inconsistencies in its narrative.

Critic Pritha Parmita Nag of Prothom Alo praised the film's visual presentation, musical setting, and Shakib Khan's performance, particularly his portrayal of emotional vulnerability. However, she felt that the film focused too heavily on romance at the expense of its musical narrative and criticized its pacing and character development. Despite these, she commended director Azman Rusho for presenting a different screen image of Khan. Meanwhile, Bangladeshi musician A K Rahul of The Daily Star praised the film's cinematography and the performances of Khan and Sabila Nur. However, he criticized its portrayal of the Bangladeshi rock music scene, arguing that the soundtrack lacked memorability and that the film failed to capture the unique struggles of local musicians. He concluded that while Rockstar succeeds as an entertaining film, it falls short of its potential as a definitive Bangladeshi rock film.

Film critic Rahman Moti of Bangla Movie Database rated the film 6.5 out of 10 and described the film as a Khan-centric film, praising Khan's screen presence and Nur's performance. However, he criticized the screenplay for lacking depth and argued that the film relied too heavily on its lead star while failing to fully explore its musical themes or establish a distinct directorial vision. Furthermore, The Business Standard described the film as a visually ambitious but emotionally flat film, praising its cinematography and Khan's performance in musical sequences while criticizing its screenplay, pacing, and lack of narrative cohesion.

In another for Bangla Movie Database, writer Mahfuz Siddiqui Himaloy praised the film for its central premise and a handful of memorable moments, but criticized its screenplay, soundtrack, and characterization, concluding that the film was a missed opportunity that failed to fulfill the potential of its musical concept. Badiuzzaman Milon of ATN News praised Rockstar for its technical execution, visual style, music, and Khan's performance, describing it as a distinctive musical drama that set a new benchmark for Dhallywood despite some narrative weaknesses in its final act. In a review, filmmaker Abu Shahed Emon praised the film's technical execution, cinematography, and performances, particularly Khan's departure from his established action-oriented image. Nevertheless, he criticized the film's screenplay, arguing that Agun's rise to stardom was underdeveloped and that the narrative failed to fully realize its themes of artistic identity, fame, and addiction.

Abrar Jahin of Khoborer Kagoj praised the film's visual presentation, music, and Khan's performance, but criticized its screenplay and characterization. He also expressed concern over the frequent depiction of drug use, arguing that the film risked glamorizing narcotics despite its apparent cautionary message. Writing for Desh Rupantor, the reviewer also commended Khan's departure from his established screen image and praised the film's cinematography, musical sequences, and production values. While noting shortcomings in the screenplay and character development, the review regarded Rockstar as a largely successful and aesthetically ambitious attempt to break away from conventional Dhallywood formulas. Lyricist and journalist Zahid Akbar described Rockstar as a potential iconic romantic film. He praised Khan's performance, Nur's portrayal of Meera, and Ahmed Hasan Sunny's songs, while also commending the film's dialogue, cinematography, and direction. He further characterized Rockstar as a modern romantic drama and predicted that it could become an iconic love story in Bangladeshi cinema.

Film critic RnaR commended the film's costumes, visual presentation, and cinematography, arguing that Rockstar established a new benchmark for Bangladeshi cinema. However, he criticized its story, screenplay, and dialogue as uneven and incoherent. Writing for Alap News, Ahsan Kabir praised the film's cinematography, performances, and Azman Rusho's directorial debut, but criticized its portrayal of rock music, emphasis on addiction, and limited depiction of the protagonist's musical development.

== Impact ==
The film's teaser attracted international attention, entering YouTube's trending lists in at least 10 countries within three days of its release. It ranked first in Bangladesh and Saudi Arabia, and also charted in Oman, Qatar, Kuwait, Malaysia, the United Arab Emirates, Singapore, India and Italy. It's international reception was seen as a positive development for the global visibility of Bangladeshi cinema.
