= Partha Pratim Majumder =

Bangladeshi mime artist (born 1954)

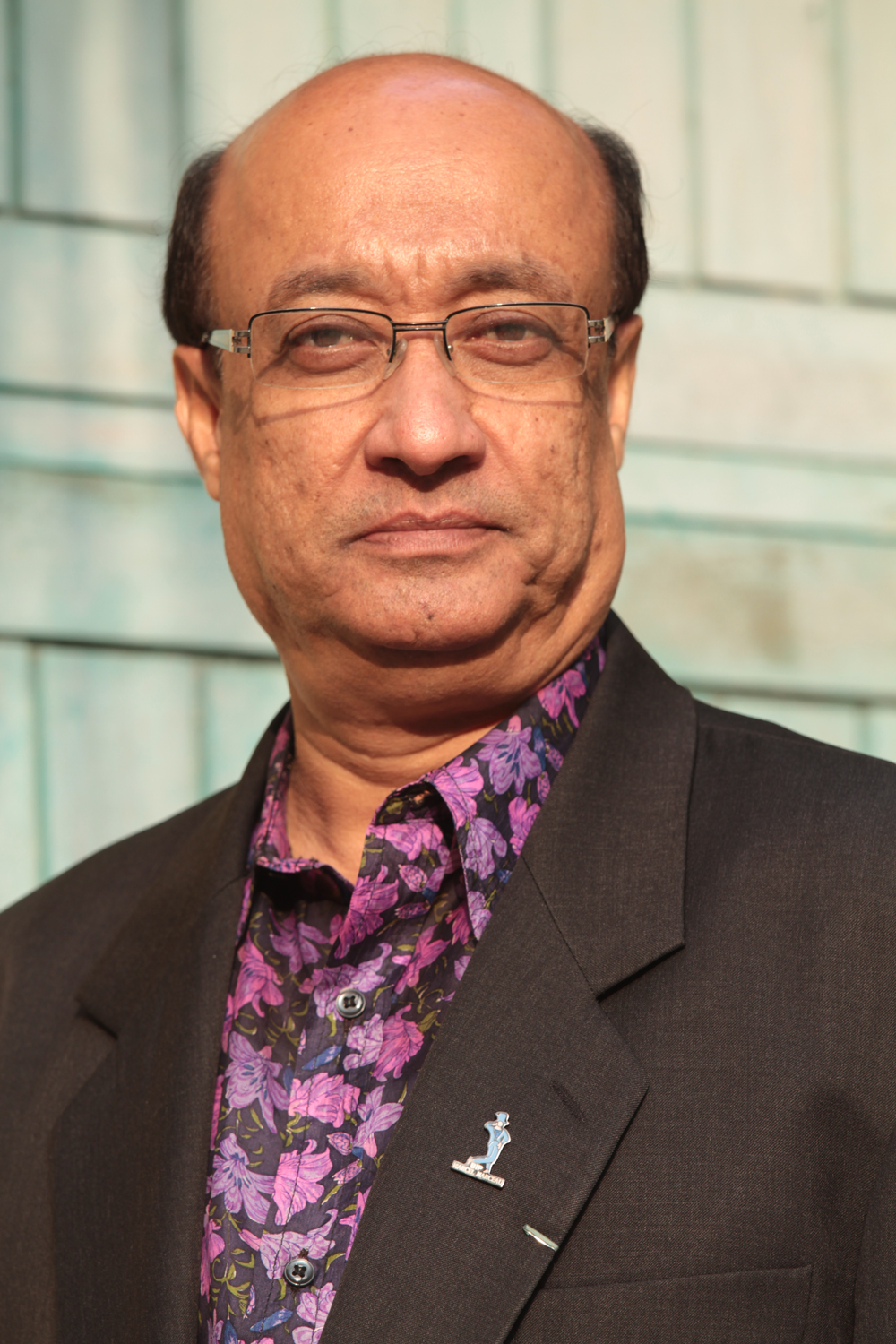
- Born: Premanshu Kumar Biswas; 18 January 1954 (age 72); Kalachadpara, Pabna, East Pakistan
- Citizenship: Bangladesh; France
- Occupation: mime artist
- Relatives: Barin Mazumder (father); Ila Majumder (mother); Bappa Mazumder (brother)
- Awards: Ekushey Padak (2010)
- Honours: Chevalier de l’Ordre des Arts et des Lettres (2011)

Partha Pratim Majumder (Bengali: পার্থ প্রতিম মজুমদার; born 18 January 1954) is a Bangladeshi mime artist who is considered the "forerunner" of mime art in Bangladesh. Born in Pabna District in the north-western part of the country, Partha went to France in early 1980s under a scholarship program and trained under Marcel Marceau. Since then he has been performing in several countries throughout the world earning international recognition. In 2010, he was awarded the Ekushey Padak, one of the highest civilian awards in Bangladesh. In 2011, the French government awarded him the Chevalier de l’Ordre des Arts et des Lettres. He is the elder brother of musician Bappa Mazumder and music composer Partha Sharothi Mojumdar.

== Early life ==
Partha was born to Himangshu Kumar Bishwash and Shusrika Bishwash in Kalachadpara of Pabna district which was then part of East Pakistan. Born as Premanshu Kumar Biswas, Partha was later adopted by Ustad Barin Mazumder and Ila Majumder. After receiving primary education at Jubilee School, he was sent to Chandannagar, India and was admitted in Dr. Shitol Prasad Ghosh Ideal School. There he met with Jogesh Dutta, an Indian mime artist and became interested in mime. Between 1966 and 1972 he studied at the Jogesh Dutta Mime Academy and received basic knowledge about the art. Meanwhile, Bangladesh became independent after a nine-month war and Partha moved back to his country. In 1972 he was admitted to Government Music College in Dhaka before graduating in 1976.The major lift up in his life was when he presented a solo performance at Bangladesh Shilpakala Academy in 1979.

== Career ==
Partha started his career in the 1970s through singing and occasionally acting in some television and radio programs. His career got a break-through in 1979. His solo performance at Shilpakala Academy impressed the then French Ambassador to Dhaka, Loic Moreau and the director of Alliance Française, Gerard Grousse, who offered him a scholarship in 1981 to obtain professional training on mime under the French mime artist Etienne Decroux. He was then introduced to Marcel Marceau who trained him from 1982 to 1985. In 1986 Partha performed a solo titled Boatman of Padma at the UNESCO Headquarter in Paris which was the first mime act at the World Heritage Centre. In 1994 he wrote, choreographed and staged The Nightmare which was the first mimodrama pertaining to child abuse to be staged in South Asia.

== Awards and titles ==
- Master of Mime – Mime Institute of India, 1987
- Master of the World – Journalist Association of Malaysia, 1987
- Molière Award – Association professionnelle et artistique du théâtre, 2009
- Munier Chowdhury Award – 2009
- Ekushey Padak – Government of Bangladesh, 2010
- Chevalier De L'Ordre des Arts et des Lettres – Government of France, 2011
