= Masha Islam =

Bangladeshi singer-songwriter

Masha Islam মাশা ইসলাম
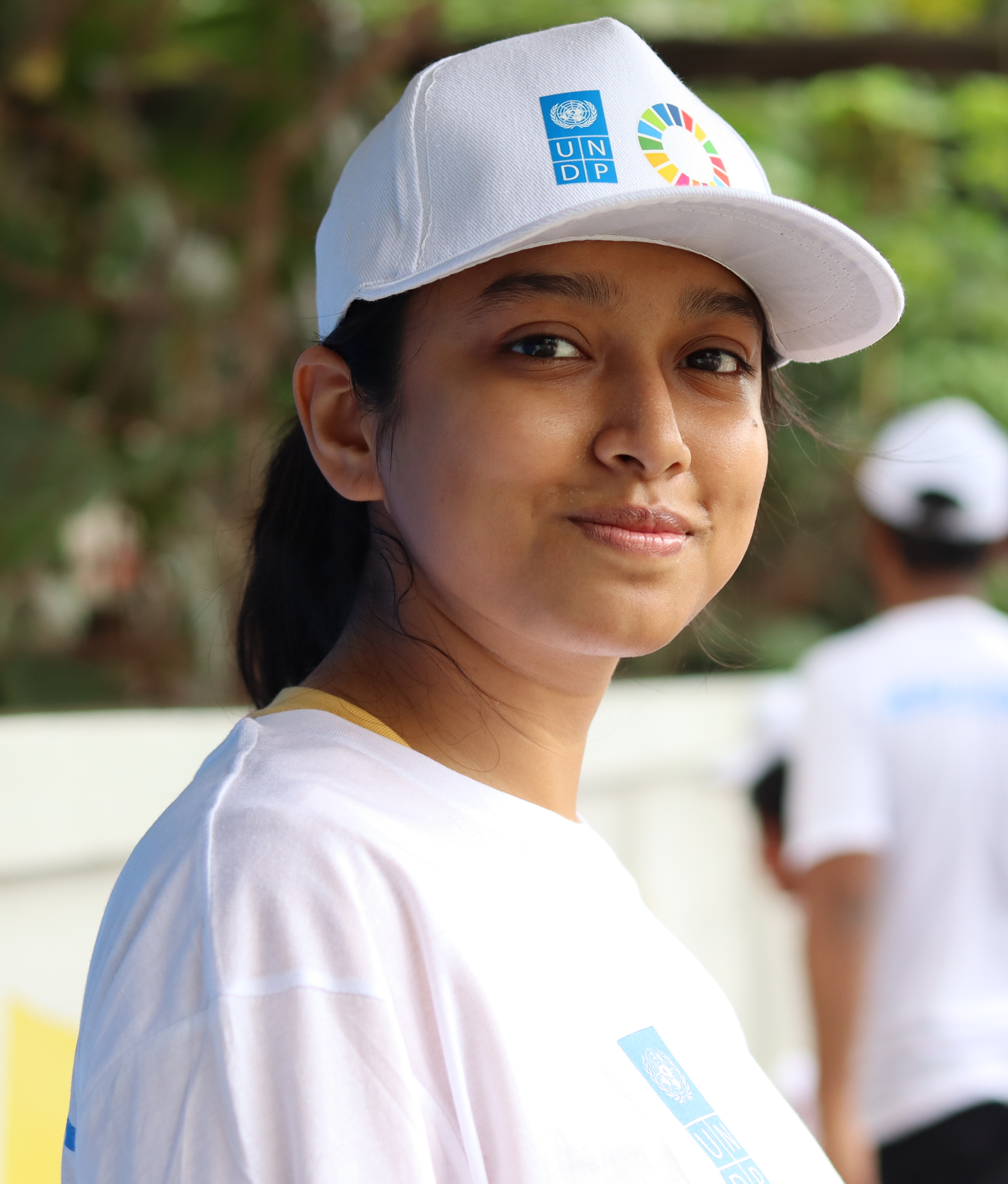
- Masha Islam at a Flash Mop event promoting the SDGs in Bangladesh

Background information
- Born: Masha Islam
- Origin: Bangladesh
- Genres: Modern; pop; classic; nazrul
- Occupations: Singer; songwriter; vocal artist
- Instruments: Vocals; guitar; ukulele; piano
- Years active: 2016–present
- Label: Saregama

Masha Islam also known as Masha is a Bangladeshi singer-songwriter and vocal artist. She is known for her notable film songs including "Porojibi Shohorer Gaan", "Teka Pakhi", "Tomar Kothar Malay", "Jibon Dilam", "Bola Hoy Na", "Ghumaila Ghumailare Bondhu", "Tomake Chai Na", "Ektukhaani Mon" and "Jete Jete".

== Career ==
Masha has worked as a voice artist on several projects. She contributed to the UK Aid backed "English in Action" campaign, voiced television commercials, and provided playback vocals for musical segments in Sisimpur, the Bangladeshi adaptation of Sesame Street.

Masha lent her voice in several playbacks, including: the title track of Mostofa Sarwar Farooki's series Ladies and Gentlemen for Zee5; "Teka Pakhi" in Chorki's film Dui Diner Duniya; "Jibon Dilam" in Raihan Rafi's film Taan; "Ektukhaani Mon" in Shihab Shaheen's film Daagi; "Ghumaila Ghumailare Bondhu" in Giasuddin Selim's film Kajolrekha; and "Jete Jete" in Mithu Khan's film Neelchokro, alongside numerous other television and YouTube drama tracks. She won Best Singer at the Blender's Choice The Daily Star OTT & Digital Content Awards 2022 for her playback of "Teka Pakhi".

In 2022, Masha was featured in Season 1 of Coke Studio Bangla, performing in two songs: "Lilabali" and "Hey Samalo". She also contributed to the theme song of the pilot season, titled "Ekla Cholo Re," a fusion track performed by multiple Bangladeshi singers.

In 2023 Masha performed at The Night of Pritom Hasan, a concert held at the International Convention City Bashundhara (ICCB) in Dhaka, sharing the stage with artists such as Habib Wahid, Arnob, Ferdous Wahid, Xefer Rahman, Armeen Musa, Raef Al Hasan Rafa, Islamuddin Palakar, and Momtaz Begum. The same year she sang at To Gaza, From Dhaka, a charity concert at the Hatirjheel Amphitheatre that united musicians from across Bangladesh in solidarity with the people of Palestine.

She also performed at the WOW – Women of the World Festival in Bangladesh.

Additionally, she appeared virtually in the coronation choir for King Charles III as part of a segment representing the Commonwealth, with her performance included in a video presentation during the coronation ceremony.

In 2024 Masha performed with Ritu Raj and Nandita Mahmood at Utsho Shondha, a charity event supporting marginalised and under privileged children and adolescents. She also lent her vocals to "Digbijoyee," a health awareness song composed by Fuad al Muqtadir under USAID's Healthier in Motion campaign. Later that year she recorded a new arrangement of Jasimuddin and Sachin Dev Burman's song "Rongila" for an episode of Pavel Areen's musical series Living Room Session.

She has collaborated with several Bangladeshi artists, including Bappa Mazumder, Tahsan Khan, Emon Chowdhury, Mahtim Shakib, Fuad al Muqtadir, Samina Chowdhury, Shayan Chowdhury Arnob, Armeen Musa, Kona, Elita Karim and Pritom Hasan.

== Works ==
Year	Film	Song(s)	Composer(s)	Co-singer(s)	Ref
2021	Ladies & Gentlemen	"Porojibi Shohorer Gaan"	Pavel Areen		
2022	Dui Diner Duniya	"Teka Pakhi"	Emon Chowdhury		
2022	Taan	"Jibon Dilam"	Jahid Nirob	Jahid Nirob	
2022	Mayashalik	"Bola Hoy Na"	Khayam Sanu Sandhi		
2023	Mercules	"Tomar Kothar Malay"	Emon Chowdhury	Emon Chowdhury	
2023	Antarjal	"Welcome To Antarjal"	Apeiruss	Sporsho Shiplu & Sheikh Shafi Mahmud	
2024	Kajolrekha	"Ghumaila Ghumailare Bondhu"	Emon Chowdhury		
2024	36-24-36	"Tomake Chai Na"	Khayam Sanu Sandhi	Khayam Sanu Sandhi	
2024	Noya Manush	"Chander Bari"	Emon Chowdhury	Animes Roy	
2025	Daagi	"Ektukhaani Mon"	Sajid Sarker	Tahsan Khan	
2025	NeelChokro	"Jete Jete"	Emon Saha		
2025	Bethar Bagan	"Pajorer Bhaje Bhaje"	Jahid Nirob	Hasibul Nibir	
2025	Shondhi	"Shondhi Bicched"	Jahid Nirob	Mahtim Shakib	

Year	Album/Song	Composer(s)	Co-singer(s)	Ref
2020	"Ja Re Jare Ure Jare Pakhi"	Shishir Ahmed		
2021	"Masha'r Gaan"	Fuad al Muqtadir		
2021	"1988"	Shishir Ahmed	Shuvo	
2022	"Kotha Furiye Jaye"	Shishir Ahmed	Bakhtiar Hossain	
