= Adity Mohsin =

Bangladeshi Rabindra Sangeet singer

Adity Mohsin অদিতি মহসিন
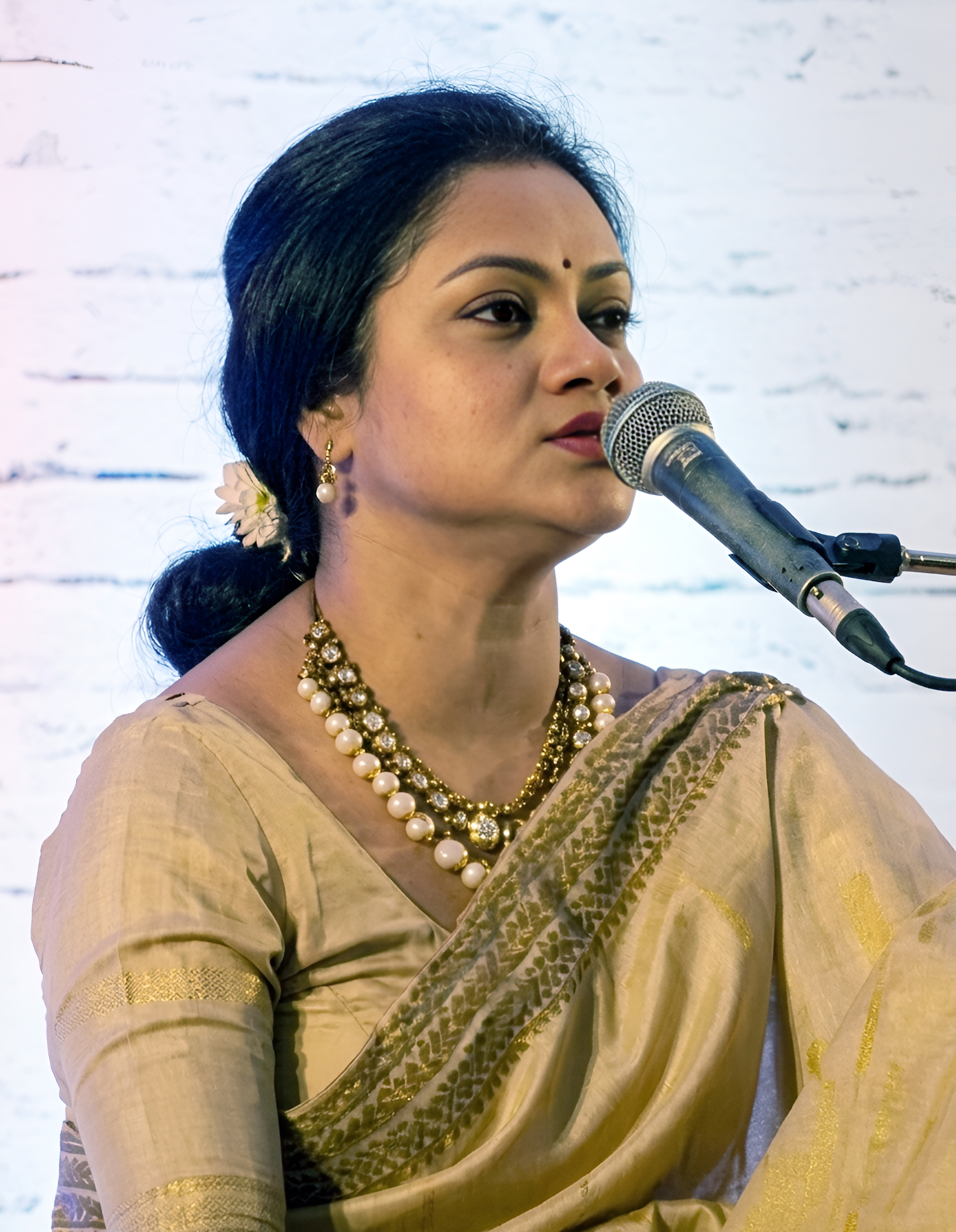
- Mohsin in 2016

Background information
- Genres: Rabindra Sangeet, modern songs
- Occupations: Singer, musician, music director
- Instruments: vocal, harmonium, esraj
- Labels: Saregama, Bengal Foundation, Prime Music
- Awards: Anannya Top Ten Awards (2003)

Adity Mohsin is a Bangladeshi Rabindra Sangeet singer.

== Early life ==
Mohsin was born in 1970 to a Bengali family of Muslim Khans hailing from the village of Paril in Manikganj, Dacca district, East Pakistan (now Bangladesh). Her father, Nur Mohsin Khan, was a president of the Noadha Majlis and namesake of the Nur Mohsin School in Paril. The family descend from the early 13th-century Baghdadi Sufi saint Ghazi Mulk Ikram Khan. Khan's name is associated with the propagation of Islam in Manikganj. He is credited to have founded the village of Paril in c. 1214 after his successful military campaigns, contributing to the spread of Islam in the greater Dacca region, and supplementing the work of later Sufi saints like Jalaluddin Tabrizi and Shah Jalal. He died in 611 AH (1214 CE) and is buried in the village of Paril. A mazar (mausoleum) has been constructed above his grave.

Mohsin joined Bulbul Academy of Fine Arts (BAFA). She met music composers Abdul Ahad and Fazle Nizami and completed her diploma in Rabindra Sangeet in 1988. She completed her IA from Holy Cross College, Dhaka. In 1992, with a scholarship from the Indian government, she went to Sangit Bhavana, Visva-Bharati University, Santiniketan to study music. She stood first class first in both her bachelors and masters.

== Career ==
Mohsin is the secretary of the Dhaka City Committee of the Jatio Rabindra Sangeet Sammilon Parishad. She is a member of the Bangladesh Rabindra Sangeet Shilpi Sangstha. Since 2000, she has worked as a senior teacher at Chhayanaut.

== Works ==
In 2003, Mohsin's first album was Amar Mon Cheye Roy. Her second album titled was Sharado Prate (2004). In 2013, she released Barshamukhor Raate Phagun Sameerane. She performs on Bangladesh Television, Bangladesh Betar, NTV, Maasranga Television, SA TV, and Tara Muzik. As a play-back singer, she has sung Rabindra Sangeet for different dramas and serials on various television channels in Bangladesh. She sang in Rabindranath Tagore's Chhinnapatra, a documentary film based on the still photographs of Nawajesh Ahmed.

In 2009, Mohsin performed in Kolkata with Asha Bhosle as one of the Panchakannya, along with Lopamudra Mitra, Subhamita Banerjee and Srabani Sen. In 2016, she performed in the Royal Albert Hall in London.

In 2023, she performed with Bappa Mazumder in the Coke Studio Bangla production Anondodhara, which received widespread compliments.

== Albums ==
=== Solo albums ===
Year	Name	Genre	Record label
2003	Amar Mon Cheye Roi	Rabindra Sangeet	Bengal Foundation
2004	Sharod Prate	Rabindra Sangeet	Prime Music
2008	Bhalobashi Bhalobashi	Rabindra Sangeet	Prime Music
2009	Barota Peyechhi Mone Mone	Rabindra Sangeet	Bengal Foundation
2010	Sokha Tomare Pailey	Atulprasadi	Bengal Foundation
2011	Emono Dine Tare Bola Jaye	Rabindra Sangeet	Saregama
2012	Amar Andhar Bhalo	Rabindra Sangeet	Saregama
2013	Barshamukhor Raate Phagun Sameerane	Rabindra Sangeet	Bengal Foundation
2014	Momo Rupey Beshe	Rabindra Sangeet	Bengal Foundation

=== Mixed albums ===
- Jagatey Andayagyae Aamar Nimantrano (2008)
- Moner Majhe Je Gaan Baje (2010)

== Awards and honors ==
- Debabrata Smriti Purashkar
- Anannya Top Ten Awards (2003)
- Citycell-Channel-i Music Awards for best Rabindra Sangeet singer (2016)
