= Lalon Band =

Bangladeshi band

Lalon লালন
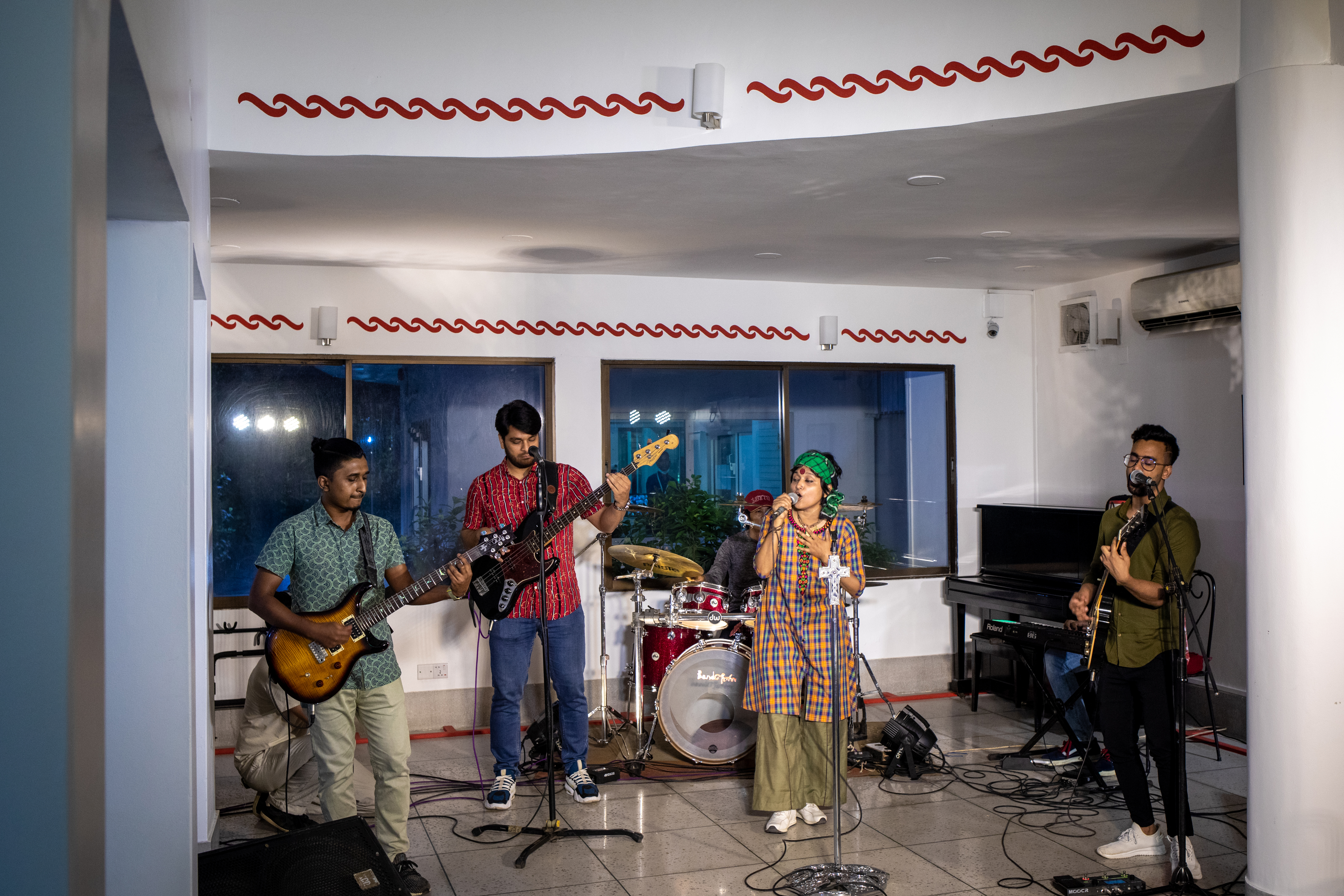

Background information
- Origin: Khulna, Bangladesh
- Genres: Rock, folk, fusion
- Years active: 2001-present
- Labels: G-Series, Sound Machine
- Members: Nigar Sultana Sumi; Thein Han Maung Titi; Tahjib-Ur-Rashid Adib; Mohonto Sarker; Arafat Bosunia
- Past members: Ahasanur Rahman Ashiq; Meer Shahriar Hossain Masum; Wahidur Rahman Masum; Iftekhar Hasan Bappy; Shaik Salekin; Jumman Hossain; Limon; Sentu; Jewel; Kamal; Rasel; Rana; Turjo; Ratul; Rafi

Lalon is a Bangladeshi folk, rock, fusion music band formed in Khulna, Bangladesh in 2001 by Nigar Sultana Sumi mostly influenced by Fakir Lalon Shah.

== History ==
Nigar Sultana Sumi established the band on 2001 in greater Khulna. She is the founder and main vocalist of the band. The band first Album Biprotip was released in 2007. After two years later their second album Khepa was released.

== Discography ==
- Biprotip – 2007
- Khepa – 2009
- B protip - 2012
- Pagol – 2012
- Sada Kalo - 2013
- Baul Of Bengal - 2014
- A Tribute to Fakir Lalon Sai – 2015

== Band members ==
=== Current members ===
- Nigar Sultana Sumi – Vocal, Founder of Band (2001–present)
- Tahjib-Ur-Rashid - Bass Player (2019–present)
- Mohonto Sarker - Guitar Player (2021–present)
- Arafat Bosunia - Keyboard Player (2021–present)
- Thein Han Maung Titi – Drums (2007–present)

=== Former members ===
- Thein Han Maung Titi – Drums (2007–2024)
- Ahasanur Rahman Ashiq - drums (2001-2007)
- Meer Shahriar Hossain Masum - keyboard (2001-2007)
- Wahidur Rahman Masum – lead guitars (2001–2011)
- Sentu - Bass 2007-2011
- Limon - Lead Guitars (2007-2011)
- Iftekhar Hasan Bappy - lead guitars, backing vocals, Songwriter, (2011-2014)
- Shaik Salekin - lead guitars (2011-2013)
- Imran - lead guitars 2013-2014
- Wasef - lead guitars 2014
- Jumman Hossain - Rapper
- Jewel - guitars
- Sohel - bass
- Rasel - Keyboard
- Turjo - Bass
- Ratul - Lead Guitar
- Rafi - Lead Guitar

== See also ==
- Bengali band music
