= Bappa Mazumder =

Bangladeshi singer, lyricist and music composer

Bappa Mazumder বাপ্পা মজুমদার
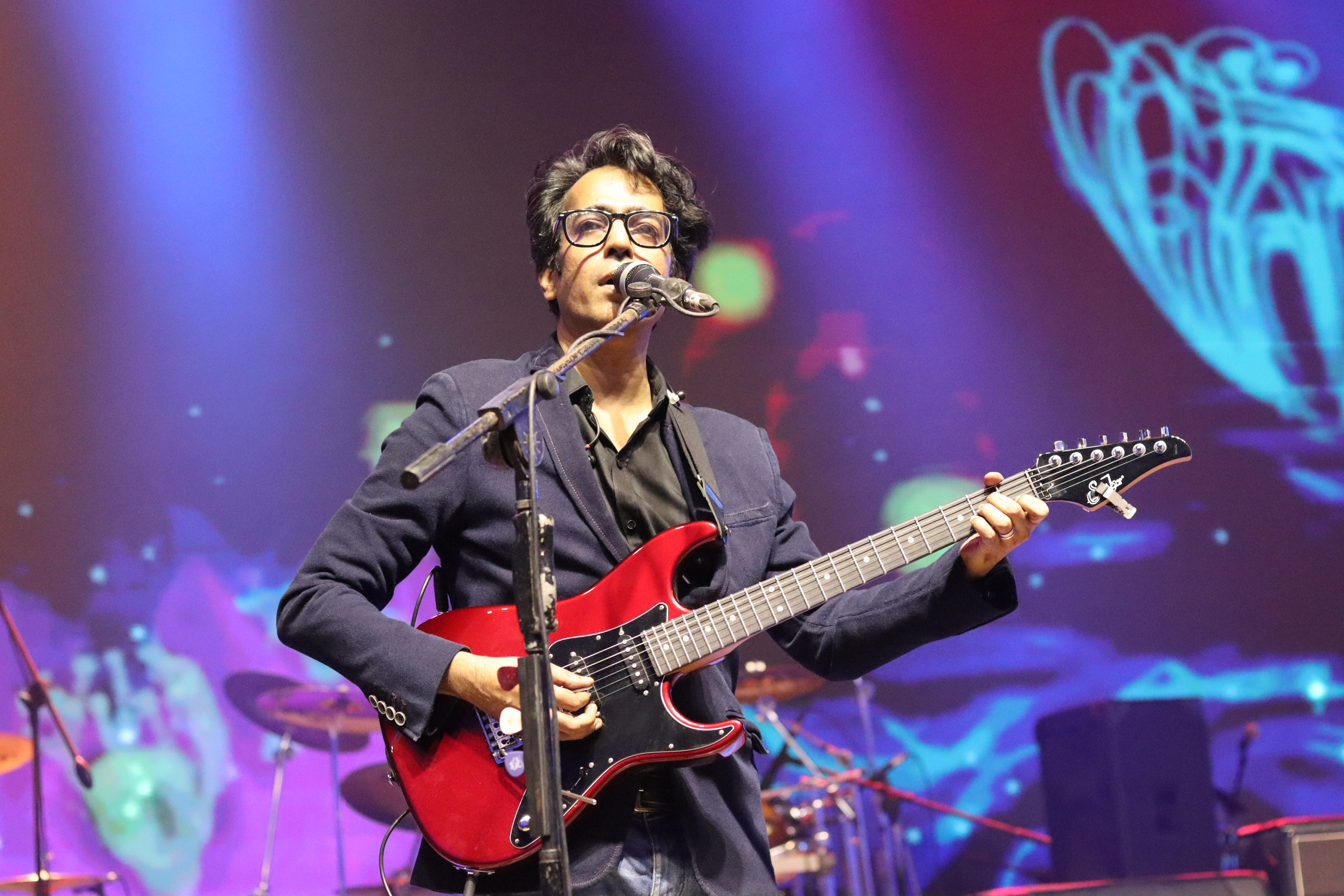
- Mazumder in 2024

Background information
- Born: Shubhashish Mazumder Bappa; 5 February 1972 (age 54)
- Instruments: Vocals, guitar, keyboards
- Years active: 1992–present
- Spouse: Mehbooba Mahnoor Chandni (m. 2008; div. 2018) Tania Hossain (m. 2018)
- Website: bappamazumder.com

Shubhashish Mazumder Bappa (born 5 February 1972), better known as Bappa Mazumder, is a Bangladeshi singer, lyricist and music composer. He is the lead singer of the rock band Dalchhut.

== Early life and family ==
Shubhashish Mazumder Bappa was born on 5 February 1972 to the musician couple, Barin Mazumder and Ila Mazumder. His elder brother, Partha Pratim Majumder, is a mime artist and Partha Sharothi Mazumder, a music composer.

== Career ==
Mazumder began his career as a session guitarist, playing instrumentals for other artists. In 1988, while preparing for his Secondary School Certificate examination (SSC), he co-founded Arani Shilpi Gosthi with his friend Anand Rahman, focusing on Gono Sangeet, recitations, and theatre. After performing at an informal gathering, he was hired as a regular guitarist by singer Hasan Abidur Reza Jewel, an engagement that led to his first project as a music director composing for Jewel's recording. In 1995, Mazumder officially launched his career as a solo vocalist with his debut studio album, Tokhon Bhor Bela.

Between 1992 and 1993, Mazumder met writer and poet Sanjeeb Chowdhury at Aziz Super Market in Shahbagh, Dhaka, leading to their collaboration on the background score for artist Ashok Karmakar's exhibition Kalratri. In November 1996, Mazumder, Chowdhury, and musician Mithu officially formed the band Dalchhut. The group's debut studio album, Ah!, was released in 1997 and gained widespread public attention after the track Shada Moila Rongila Pale was broadcast on the television program Shuveccha in 1998. Their sophomore album, Hridoypur (2000), achieved wider commercial success following the feature of Gari Chole Na Chole Na on Hanif Sanket's television magazine show Ityadi. Following Chowdhury's death in 2007, Mazumder kept Dalchhut active and later released the tribute album Sanjeeb in his memory.

Mazumder entered film music under composer Emon Saha, performing playback vocals for Chashi Nazrul Islam's film Shuva. He subsequently composed the background score for Golam Rabbani Biplob's film Sopnodanay and served as the music director for Shubhovibaho. In 2017, Mazumder composed and directed the soundtrack for the film Sotta, earning the National Film Award for Best Composer, while his composition Tor Premete Ondho Holam (performed by James) won the National Film Award for Best Male Playback Singer.

In September 2022, Carrot Comm organized a career retrospective concert, "Alive Experience Chapter One Bappa Mazumder," marking his 30 years in professional music. That same year, he participated in the first season of Coke Studio Bangla, performing the duet Anondodhara alongside classical-contemporary vocalist Aditi Mohsin. In June 2023, he received recognition for his contributions to Bengali music at the 20th Tele Cine Awards in Kolkata, India. In November 2024, Mazumder released Onubhob, an experimental Bengali ghazal-style album written by Syed Galib Hasan featuring guest vocalists Konal and Tanvir Alam Sajib. In January 2025, he recorded his first-ever duet with singer Runa Laila, titled "Onayashe", written by Syed Galib Hasan at his Banani studio.

== Discography ==
- Tokhon Bhor Bela (1996)
- Kothao Keu Nei (1997)
- Hridoyer Canvas (1998)
- Rater Train (1999)
- Dhulo Pora Chithi (2001)
- Rath Prohori (2004)
- Kodin Porei Chuti (2004)
- Din Bari Jay (2006)
- Surjo Snane Chol (2008)
- Beche Thak Shobuj (2012)
- Janina Kon Montorey (2014)
- Bedhechi Amar Pran (2015)
- Benananda (2015)
- Boka Ghuri (2016)
- Bappa Mazumder (2016)

== Personal life ==
In 2008, Mazumder married dancer Mehbooba Mahnoor Chandni; they divorced in 2018. He then married actress Tania Hossain on 23 June 2018. Their first child, Agnimitra Mazumder Piyeta, was born in December 2019 and the second one in October 2024.
