= Coke Studio Bangla =

Bangladeshi television programme

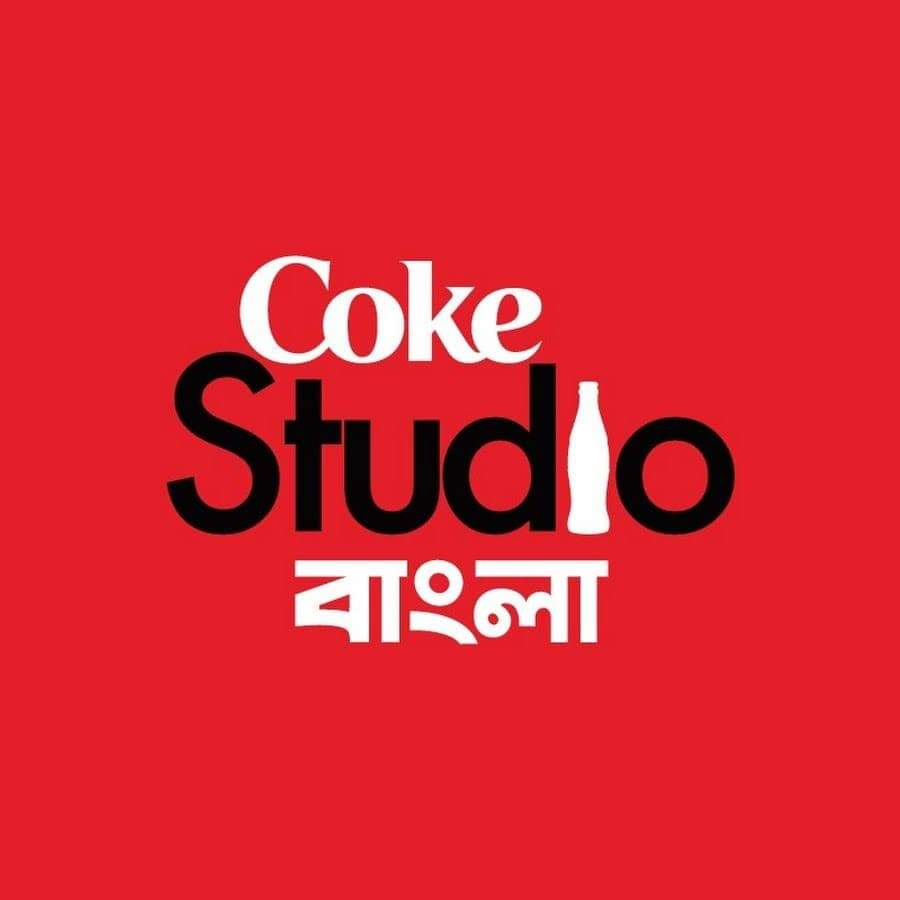
- Logo of Coke Studio Bangla
- কোক স্টুডিও বাংলা
- Country of origin: Bangladesh
- No. of seasons: 4
- No. of episodes: 36 (list of episodes)

Production
- Executive producer: Coca-Cola Bangladesh
- Producer: Shayan Chowdhury Arnob
- Production locations: Dhaka, Bangladesh
- Camera setup: Multi-camera
- Running time: 3-10 minutes
- Production company: Dot Birth Ltd

Original release
- Network: Deepto TV and YouTube
- Release: 7 February 2022 – present

Coke Studio Bangla

YouTube information
- Channel: Coke Studio Bangla
- Years active: 2022–present
- Genre: Music
- Subscribers: 4.88 million ▲
- Views: 1.2 billion ▲
- Last updated: 0 days ago

Coke Studio Bangla, also known as Coke Studio Bangladesh, is a Bangladeshi television series which is the local installment of the Coke Studio franchise, featuring studio-recorded music performances by established and emerging Bangladeshi artists with the goal of promoting Bangladeshi music.

== History ==
Coke Studio originated in Brazil back in 2007 as a unique fusion music initiative, aimed at blending the musical styles of two different Brazilian artists. Later, Nadeem Zaman, the Marketing Head of The Coca-Cola Company, collaborated with Rohail Hyatt, a former member of Vital Signs, to produce a Pakistani version of the show. The inaugural season premiered in June 2008, in front of a live audience. However, the format transitioned to a closed studio for subsequent seasons, which remains the current format of the show. In June 2012, the Indian version of Coke Studio, named Coke Studio @ MTV, debuted, with Leslie Lewis producing the first season and various producers helming subsequent ones. The show ran for four seasons.

Coke Studio Bangla, the digital-first music platform under the Coke Studio franchise, was launched in Bangladesh on 7 February 2022, and its second season began airing on 14 February 2023. The third season premiered on 13 April 2024. The fourth season started streaming on 23 May 2026.

== Series overview ==
Series	Episodes	Originally released	
Series	Episodes	First released	Last released
1	10	7 February 2022	1 September 2022
2	12	14 February 2023	9 September 2023
Special: Murir Tin Animation		10 October 2023	
Special: Victory Day		15 December 2023	
3	8	13 April 2024	16 November 2025
4	8	23 May 2026	TBA

== Seasons ==
=== Season 1 ===
The series' first season was launched on 7 February 2022, taking inspiration from the success of the Coke Studio franchises in Pakistan and India. The first season ended on 1 September 2022 after airing ten consecutive songs, focused on the folk heritage of Bangladesh.

=== Season 2 ===
The second season of the series made its official debut on 14 February 2023, the same day as Pahela Falgun, the first day of spring in the Bangladeshi calendar and Valentine's Day and ended on 9 September 2023. The Season 2 ended with 'Dilaram', a song written by late Hason Raja

=== Season 3 ===
Season 3 of Coke Studio Bangla premiered on 13 April 2024, boasting a diverse lineup of over 180 musicians and artists from Bangladesh and around the world. Scheduled for release throughout 2024, the season will unveil 11 new songs carefully curated under the guidance of Shayan Chowdhury Arnob, with contributions from producers such as Pritom Hasan, Emon Chowdhury, and Shuvendu Das Shuvo. This collaborative approach to music production, involving multiple producers, was initially introduced in Season 2 of Coke Studio @ MTV and later adopted in Season 9 and Season 10 of Coke Studio Pakistan.

=== Season 4 ===
The franchise's 4th season began to air from 23 May 2026, ahead of Kazi Nazrul Islam's 127th birthday with his song "Room Jhoom" mashed up with Turkish folk song "Üsküdar'a Gider İken", from which the melody of the previous song is inpired. This season is expected to release 8 songs in total.

== Reception ==
The show has received positive feedback for its distinctive blend of traditional and contemporary Bangladeshi music, along with its impressive production quality. However, certain critics have expressed concerns about its originality, claiming that it resembles other Coke Studio shows from different countries. Notwithstanding the criticism, Coke Studio Bangla has achieved significant commercial success, as the first season surpassed several million views on YouTube. In an interview with the media, Arnab Roy, Vice President of Marketing for India and Southwest Asia at Coca-Cola, said that the company launched Coke Studio Bangladesh in 2022 as a trial run before relaunching the India version. The success of the digital-only Coke Studio Bangladesh helped Roy and his team decide to make Coke Studio Bharat a digital-only production as well.

== See also ==
- Bengali band music
- Coke Studio Bharat
- Coke Studio Tamil
- Coke Studio Pakistan
