= List of Bangladeshi films of 2017 =

This article lists feature-length films and full-length documentaries that were at least partly produced by the Bangladeshi film industry and were released in Bangladesh in 2017. Short films and made-for-TV films are not included. Films are ordered by domestic public release date, excluding film festivals, theatrical releases abroad, and sneak previews or screenings.

== Highest-grossing films ==
The top three films released in 2017 by gross collection are as follows:

Rank	Title	Studio	Worldwide gross	Ref.
1	Nabab	Jaaz Multimedia	৳ 12 crore	
2	Dhaka Attack	Splash Multimedia	৳ 9.50 crore	
3	Boss 2: Back to Rule	Jaaz Multimedia	৳ 4.02 crore	

== Events ==
Date	Event	Host	Location	Ref.
January 12 – 20, 2017	15th Dhaka International Film Festival	Rainbow Film Society	Dhaka, Bangladesh	
April 21, 2017	19th Meril Prothom Alo Awards	Ferdous Ahmed, Purnima	Bangabandhu International Conference Center	
May 18, 2017	40th National Film Awards	Chanchal Chowdhury	Dhaka, Bangladesh	

== Releases ==
=== January–March ===
Opening		Title	Director	Starring	Genre	Note	Ref.
J A N	6	Mastan O Police	Rakibul Alam Rakib	Kazi Maruf, Bindiya	Action		
J A N	13	Koto Shopno Koto Asha	Wakil Ahmed	Pori Moni, Bappy Chowdhury			
J A N	13	Rina Brown	Shameem Akhtar	Proma Paboni, Barun Chanda, Mahfuz Rizvee	War, drama		
J A N	20	Je Golpe Bhalobasha Nei	Royal Khan	Sumit, Tanha Moumachi, Firoz Shahi, Ishara			
J A N	20	Tukhor	Mizanur Rahman Labu	Shibli Naoman, Ratshree Dutt			
J A N	27	Valobasha Emoni Hoy	Tania Ahmed	Irfan Sajjad, Mim Bidya Sinha Saha	Romance		
F E B	3	Mayabini	Akash Acharya	Airin Sultana, Symon Sadik			
F E B	10	Premi O Premi	Jakir Hossain Raju	Arifin Shuvo, Nusraat Faria	Romantic comedy		
F E B	24	Satyakar Manush	Badrul Amin	Kankon, Nazneen Akhter Happy			
F E B	24	Shesh Chumbon	Muntahidul Liton	Sagar Ahmed, Sanjida Tanmoy			
M A R	3	Bhuban Majhi	Fakhrul Arefeen Khan	Parambrata Chatterjee, Aparna Ghosh, Quazi Nawshaba Ahmed, Mamunur Rashid	War		
M A R	3	Missed Call	Shafi Uddin Shafi	Bappy Chowdhury, Mugdhota, Bapparaj			
M A R	10	Meyeti Ekhon Kothay Jabe	Nader Chowdhury	Falguni Rahman Jolly, Fazlur Rahman Babu, Shah Riaz	Drama		
M A R	17	Bhalobasa Sholo Ana	Monir Hossain Mithu	Adnan, Jhumur	Romance		
M A R	24	Crime Road	Simon Tariq	Anisur Rahman Milon, Shayla Shabi	Action, romance		
M A R	24	Shunya	Bandhan Biswas	Omar Sani, Racy	Action, romance		
M A R	31	Hothat Dekha	Reshmi Mitra, Shahadat Hossain	Debashree Roy, Ilias Kanchan	Romance	Released in India on 2 December 2016	
M A R	31	Nuru Miah and His Beauty Driver	Mizanur Rahman	Fazlur Rahman Babu	Drama		
M A R	31	Sultana Bibiana	Himel Ashraf	Bappy Chowdhury, Achol, Amit Hasan, Shahiduzzaman Selim, Mamunur Rashid	Romance		

=== April–June ===
Opening		Title	Director	Starring	Genre	Note	Ref.
A P R	7	Swatta	Hashibur Reza Kallol	Shakib Khan, Paoli Dam	Romance-drama		
A P R	14	Dhat Teri Ki	Shamim Ahamed Roni	Arifin Shuvo, Nusraat Faria, Ziaul Roshan, Farin Khan	Comedy		
A P R	21	Tui Amar	Sajol Ahmad	Symon Sadik, Misty Jannat	Romance-drama		
A P R	28	Apon Manush	Shah Alam Mondol	Bappy Chowdhury, Pori Moni	Romance		
M A Y	5	Porobashinee	Swapan Ahmed	Mamnun Hasan Emon, Sabyasachi Chakrabarty, Reeth Mazumder	Sci-fi		
M A Y	5	Tumi Robe Nirobe	Mahbuba Islam Sumi	Irfan Sajjad, Tanjin Tisha, Bhaswar Chattopadhyay			
M A Y	5	Milon Shetu	Mizanur Rahman	Fahim Chowdhury, Sharmin Akhter Prema, Ali Raj, Mizu Ahmed	Romance, action		
J U N	26	Boss 2: Back to Rule	Baba Yadav	Jeet, Nusraat Faria	Action		
J U N	26	Nabab	Joydeep Mukherjee	Shakib Khan, Subhashree Ganguly, Amit Hasan, Rajatava Dutta	Action		
J U N	26	Rajneeti	Bulbul Biswas	Shakib Khan, Apu Biswas, Anisur Rahman Milon, Amit Hasan, Ali Raj	Political thriller		

=== July–September ===
Opening		Title	Director	Starring	Genre	Note	Ref.
J U L	26	Grash	Maria Afrin Tusar	Toma Mirza, RB Pritom, Jyotika Jyoti			
J U L	26	Modhu Hoi Hoi Bish Khawaila	Jasim Uddin Zakir	Saif Khan, Jeff, Rodela Tithi			
A U G	4	Voyonkor Sundor	Animesh Aich	Parambrata Chatterjee, Ashna Habib Bhabna	Suspense		
A U G	11	Mar Chokka	Moin Biswas	Omar Sani, Alexander Bow, Hero Alom			
A U G	11	Raian	Mashroor Parvez	Mashroor Parvez, Arsha, Sohel Rana			
A U G	18	Ek Palak Dekha	AR Rahman	Nayak Meheraj Mehedi, Salman Jafri, Sabneer			
S E P	2	Shesh Kotha	Syed Wahiduzzaman Diamond	Mamunur Rashid, Irene		Premiered on TV	
S E P	2	Ohongkar	Shahadat Hossain Liton	Shakib Khan, Shobnom Bubly	Romance		
S E P	2	Rangbaaz	Shamim Ahamed Roni, Abdul Mannan	Shakib Khan, Shobnom Bubly	Action		
S E P	2	Shona Bondhu	Jahangir Alam Sumon	Pori Moni, Popy, DA Tayeb	Drama		
S E P	22	The Cage	Akram Khan	Jaya Ahsan	Drama		
S E P	29	Sholo Ana Prem	Ali Azad	Symon Sadik			
S E P	29	To Be Continued	Iftekhar Ahmed Fahmi	Purnima, Mishu Sabbir		TV premiere on 3 September 2017	

=== October–December ===
Opening		Title	Director	Starring	Genre	Note	Ref.
O C T	6	Dhaka Attack	Deepankar Deepan	Arifin Shuvo, Mahiya Mahi	Action, thriller		
O C T	20	Dulavai Zindabad	Montazur Rahman Akbar	Moushumi, Mim, Bappy, Dipjol	Action, drama		
O C T	27	Doob: No Bed of Roses	Mostofa Sarwar Farooki	Irrfan Khan, Nusrat Imrose Tisha	Drama		
N O V	3	Game Returns	Royal Khan	Nirab Hossain, Toma Mirza, Labonno Lee			
N O V	3	Kopaler Likhon	Jewel Farshi	Kiron Kumar, Masum Aziz, Sangram Khan			
N O V	10	Khas Jamin	Sarwar Hossain	Symon Sadik, Bipasha Kabir			
D E C	1	Chitkini	Sajedul Awal	Runa Khan			
D E C	1	Haldaa	Tauquir Ahmed	Mosharraf Karim, Zahid Hasan, Nusrat Imrose Tisha			
D E C	8	Chal Palai	Debashish Biswas	Shipon Mitra, Toma Mirza, Shah Riaz			
D E C	15	Antor Jala	Malek Afsari	Zayed Khan, Pori Moni			
D E C	22	Ankhi O Tar Bandhura	Morshedul Islam	Zahin Nawar Haque			
D E C	22	Innocent Love	Apurba-Rana	Pori Moni, Jeff, Sohel Rana			
D E C	29	Gohin Baluchor	Badrul Anam Saud	Neelanjona Neela, Abu Hurayra Tanvir, Jannatun Nur Moon			

== See also ==
- 2017 in Bangladesh
