= List of Bangladeshi films of 2015 =

This article lists feature-length films and full-length documentaries that were at least partly produced by the Bangladeshi film industry and were released in Bangladesh in 2015. Short films and made-for-TV films are not included. Films are ordered by domestic public release date, excluding film festivals, theatrical releases abroad, and sneak previews or screenings.

== Releases ==
=== January–March ===
Opening		Title	Director	Starring	Production company	Genre	Ref.
J A N	2	Game	M Sharfuddin Anik	Nirab Hossain, Amrita Khan	MT Media Limited	Action	
J A N	9	Putro Ekhon Poysawala	Nargis Akhter	Babita, Emon, Shaina Amin, Farah Ruma	Multimedia Production	Drama	
J A N	16	Romeo vs Juliet	Abdul Aziz, Ashok Pati	Mahiya Mahi, Ankush Hazra	Jaaz Multimedia, Eskay Movies	Romantic comedy	
J A N	30	Commissioner	Anwar Siraj	Saif Khan, Sylvie			
F E B	6	Zero Degree	Animesh Aich	Mahfuz Ahmed, Jaya Ahsan		Thriller	
F E B	6	Big Brother	Shafi Uddin Shafi	Mahiya Mahi, Shipan Mitra, Ahmed Sharif, Danny Sidak			
F E B	27	Bhalobasha Simaheen	Shah Alam Mandal	Pori Moni, Anisur Rahman Milon, Zayed Khan		Romance	
M A R	6	Kartooz	Bapparaj	Farzana Rikta, Samraat	Rajlokkhi Productions	Action	
M A R	13	Eito Prem	Shohel Arman	Shakib Khan, Afsana Ara Bindu			
M A R	26	Horijupia	Golam Mostafa Shimul	Kazi Raju, Khairul Alam Sabuj, Mahmudul Islam Mithu, Riaz Mahmud		Drama	
M A R	26	Hridoy Dolano Prem	Abul Kalam Azad	Achol, Fahim Chowdhury, Ashik Chowdhury		Romance	

=== April–June ===
Opening		Title	Director	Starring	Production company	Genre	Ref.
A P R	3	Pagla Diwana	Wajed Ali Sumon	Shahriaz, Pori Moni		Action, romance	
A P R	10	Chuye Dile Mon	Shihab Shaheen	Arifin Shuvoo, Zakia Bari Mamo		Romance	
A P R	10	Gunda: The Terrorist	Ispahani Arif Jahan	Bappy Chowdhury, Achol	Diganto Chalachchitra	Action, romance	
A P R	24	Chini Bibi	Nazrul Islam Babu	Misty Jannat, Joy Chowdhury	Jaaz Multimedia		
M A Y	1	Warning	Shafi Uddin Shafi	Arifin Shuvoo, Mahiya Mahi	Maple Films		
M A Y	8	Ayna Sundori	Maqbool Hossain	Nayak Ashik Chowdhury, Tania Ritu			
M A Y	8	Bojhena Se Bojhena	Montazur Rahman Akbar	Akash Khan, Achol, Amit Hasan		Action, romance	
M A Y	8	Sutopar Thikana	Prasun Rahman	Aparna Ghosh, Jayanta Chattopadhyay, Shahadat Hossain, Mahmudul Islam		Drama	
M A Y	15	Action Jasmine	Iftakar Chowdhury	Symon Sadik, Bobby		Action	
M A Y	15	Ghashful	Akram Khan	Kazi Asif, Saila Sabi	Impress Telefilm		
M A Y	22	Ochena Hridoy	Shafiqul Islam Khan	Emon, Prosun Azad, ABM Sumon		Action, romance	
M A Y	29	Dui Beayar Kirti	Abdullah Al Mamun	Ferdous, Popy			
M A Y	29	U-Turn	Alvi Ahmed	Shipan Mitra, Sonia Hossain, Airin			
J U N	5	Bhalobasar Challenge				Romance	
J U N	5	Dui Prithibi	F I Manik	Shakib Khan, Apu Biswas, Ahona Rahman		Romance	
J U N	5	Moner Ajante	Zakir Khan	Ferdous Ahmed, Shakhawat Hossain Nirab		Romance	

=== July–September ===
Opening		Title	Director	Starring	Production company	Genre	Notes
J U L Y	18	Agnee 2	Iftakar Chowdhury	Mahiya Mahi, Raja Goswami Om, Ashish Vidyarthi	Jaaz Multimedia, Eskay Movies	Action	
J U L Y	18	Ami O Ice-cream Wala	Sumon Dhor	Tarique Anam Khan, Abul Hayat, Chayanta Chattapadyay	Impress Telefilm		
J U L Y	18	Love Marriage	Shahin-Sumon	Shakib Khan, Apu Biswas		Action, romance	
J U L Y	18	Nodijon	Shahnewaz Kakoli	Nirab, Mamunur Rashid, Chayanta Chattapadyay, Toma Mirza	Impress Telefilm		
J U L Y	18	Padma Patar Jol	Tonmoy Tansen	Emon, Bidya Sinha Saha Mim	Tripod Films	Romance	
J U L Y	31	Bhalo Amake Baste Hobe	Ali Azad	Ananya, Simanta			
A U G	7	Black Money	Shafi Uddin Shafi	Symon Sadik, Moushumi Hamid, Keya	Movie Planet Multimedia		
A U G	14	Aro Bhalobashbo Tomay	SA Haque Alik	Shakib Khan, Pori Moni, Bobby			
A U G	14	Blackmail	Anonno Mamun	Anisur Rahman Milon, Bobby, Moushumi Hamid		Romance, comedy	
A U G	21	Lover Number One	Faruk Omar	Bappy Chowdhury, Pori Moni, Tania Brishty			
A U G	28	The Story of Samara	Rikia Masudo	Shiba Ali Khan, Jannatul Ferdous Peya			
S E P	4	Jalal's Story	Abu Shahed Emon	Arafat Rahman, Mosharraf Karim, Tauquir Ahmed, Moushumi Hamid	Impress Telefilm	Drama	(Note: Jalal's Story premiered at the Busan International Film Festival in South Korea on 5 October 2014.)
S E P	4	Ma Baba Santan	AR Mukul Netrabadi	Chamak Tara, Fahim			
S E P	24	Aashiqui	Abdul Aziz, Ashok Pati	Ankush Hazra, Nusraat Faria Mazhar	Jaaz Multimedia, Eskay Movies	Romance	(Note: Aashiqui was released in India on 18 September.)
S E P	24	Gariwala	Ashraf Shishir	Rokeya Prachy, Raisul Islam Asad, Masum Aziz	Impress Telefilm		(Note: Gariwala premiered at the Sharjah International Film Festival for Children & Youth in the United Arab Emirates on 23 October 2014.)
S E P	24	Prarthona	Shahriar Nazim Joy	Tauquir Ahmed, Shahriar Nazim Joy, Mousumi Nag	Impress Telefilm		
S E P	24	Rajababu: The Power	Badiul Alam Khokon	Shakib Khan, Eamin Haque Bobby, Apu Biswas	Bhawal Pictures	Romance	

=== October–December ===
Opening		Title	Director	Starring	Production company	Genre	Ref.
O C T	9	Cheleti Abol Tabol Meyeti Pagol Pagol	Saif Chandan	Kayes Arju, Airin			
O C T	9	Surinagar	Minhaj Kibria	Minhaj Kibria, Nayla, Neepa Akhter			
O C T	16	Ajab Prem	Wajed Ali Sumon	Bappy Chowdhury, Achol		Romance	
O C T	16	Run Out	Tonmoy Tansen	Shajal Noor, Mousumi Nag, Romana Shwarna		Romance, crime, thriller	
O C T	23	Bhalobashar Golpo	Anonno Mamun	Anisur Rahman Milon, Munia Afrin			
O C T	23	Nagar Mastan	Rakibul Islam Rakib	Pori Moni, Zayed Khan, Shahriaz			
O C T	30	Ashanta Meye	F. Jahangir	Tania Ritu			
O C T	30	Bhalobaste Mon Lage	Kalam Kaiser	Hridoy Chowdhury, Nirjana			
N O V	6	Antaranga	Chashi Nazrul Islam	Alisha Pradhan, Emon, Amit Hasan			
N O V	6	Chupi Chupi Prem	Mostafizur Rahman Manik	Symon Sadik, Priyonti			
N O V	20	I Love You Priya	Mamun Khan	Sagar, Shampar			
N O V	20	Mohua Shundori	Raushan Ara Neepa	Pori Moni, Sumit Sengupta			
N O V	27	Gangster Returns	Ashiqur Rahman	Ziaul Faruq Apurba, Jannatul Ferdous Peya			
D E C	4	Black	Raja Chanda, Kamal Muhammad Kibria Lipu	Soham Chakraborty, Bidya Sinha Saha Mim		Action	(Note: Black was released in India on 27 November.)
D E C	11	Anil Bagchir Ekdin	Morshedul Islam	Aref Syed, Gazi Rakayet, Jyotika Jyoti			
D E C	11	Epar Opar	Delwar Jahan Jhantu	Bappy Chowdhury, Achol			
D E C	11	Shovoner Shadhinota	Manik Manobik	Ferdous, Nipun Akter			
D E C	18	No Chhoy	Rafael Ahsan	Ferdous, Moutushi Biswas			
D E C	18	Bapjaner Bioscope	Reazul Mawla Rezu	Shahiduzzaman Selim, Shatabdi Wadud, Sanjida Tanmoy			
D E C	25	Lalchar	Nader Chowdhury	Anisur Rahman Milon, Mohona Mim			
D E C	25	Shorgo Theke Norok	Arup Ratan Choudhury	Ferdous, Nipun Akter			

== See also ==
- 2015 in Bangladesh
