= List of Bangladeshi films of 2016 =

This article lists feature-length films and full-length documentaries that were at least partly produced by the Bangladeshi film industry and were released in Bangladesh in 2016. Short films and made-for-TV films are not included. Films are ordered by domestic public release date, excluding film festivals, theatrical releases abroad, and sneak previews or screenings.

No films were released in June because of the observance of Ramadan.

== Releases ==
=== January–March ===
Opening		Title	Director	Cast	Genre	Studio	Ref.
J A N	1	Matir Pori	Simon Tariq	Symon Sadik, Moumita Mau, Sadia Islam Lamia	Romance, action	Multimedia Productions	
J A N	8	Bhul Jodi Hoi	Chashi Nazrul Islam	Emon, Samrat, Alisha Pradhan		ATN Multimedia	
J A N	15	Angaar	Wajed Ali Sumon	Om, Falguni Rahman Jolly		Jaaz Multimedia, Eskay Movies	
J A N	22	Under Construction	Rubaiyat Hossain	Shahana Goswami, Rahul Bose		Khona Talkies	(Note: Under Construction premiered at the Seattle International Film Festival on 6 June 2015.)
J A N	29	Pure Jay Mon	Apurba-Rana	Symon Sadik, Pori Moni		Sony Movies International	
F E B	5	Raja 420	Uttam Akash	Shakib Khan, Apu Biswas, Amit Hasan	Comedy	Godhuli Films	
F E B	12	Bhalobasboi To	Belal Ahmed	Moushumi, Niloy Alamgir	Romance	Impress Telefilm	
F E B	12	Sweetheart	Wajed Ali Sumon	Riaz, Mim Bidya Sinha Saha, Bappy Chowdhury	Romance	Digital Movies	
F E B	19	Hero 420	Saikat Nasir	Nusraat Faria, Om, Riya Sen		Jaaz Multimedia, Eskay Movies	
F E B	26	Krishnopokkho	Meher Afroz Shaon	Riaz, Mahiya Mahi		Impress Telefilm	
M A R	4	Chhinamul	Kazi Hayat	Kazi Maruf, Orin, Kazi Hayat		Multimedia Productions	
M A R	11	Bullet Babu	Moin Biswas	Rohan, Emu Sikder, Shakira	Action	Jyoti Film International, FNA Films	
M A R	11	Gundami	Simon Tariq	Shahriaz, Bipasha Kabir, Alexander Bo		Ali Films	
M A R	16	Mia Bibi Razi	Shaheen Sumon	Sumit, Shirin Shila			
M A R	18	Bhola To Jay Na Tare	Rafique Sikder	Nirab Hossain, Tanha Tasnia	Romance	Dhaleswari Films Production Limited	
M A R	18	Chhota Kaku	Afzal Hossain	Afzal Hossain, Orsha, Simanta			
M A R	25	Utola Mon	Abdul Awal	Arian Shah, Nir, Monica	Romance	Awal Films	

=== April–June ===
Opening		Title	Director	Cast	Genre	Studio	Ref.
A P R	1	Mon Jaane Na Moner Adhar	Mushfiqur Rahman Gulzar	Moushumi, Ferdous	Courtroom drama	Impress Telefilm	
A P R	8	Onek Dame Kena	Jakir Hossain Raju	Bappy, Mahiya Mahi		Jaaz Multimedia	
A P R	8	Purno Doirgho Prem Kahini 2	Shafi Uddin Shafi	Shakib Khan, Jaya Ahsan	Sports	Friends Movies International	
A P R	15	Shankhachil	Goutam Ghose	Prosenjit Chatterjee, Kusum Sikder	Drama	Ashirbad Cholochchitro, Impress Telefilm	
A P R	22	Musafir	Ashiqur Rahman	Arifin Shuvoo, Marjan Jenifa	Action, thriller	Perceptual Pictures	
A P R	29	Baje Chele	Monirul Islam Sohail, Rahim Babu	Bappy, Bipasha Kabir, Dipali		Eastern Motion Pictures, Color Frames	
A P R	29	Ice Cream	Redoan Rony	Sariful Razz, Nafiza Tushi, Kumar Uday		Ping Pong Entertainment	
M A Y	6	Ostitto	Anonno Mamun	Arifin Shuvoo, Tisha	Romance	DreamBox Production	
M A Y	13	Ojante Bhalobasha	A J Rana	Symon Sadik, Alisha Pradhan			
M A Y	13	Rudro	Sayem Jafar Imami	ABM Sumon, Peya Bipasha			
M A Y	26	Dewana Mann	Nurul Islam Pritam	Rafi Salman, Omar Sani, Javed, Danny Raj			

=== July–September ===
Opening		Title	Director	Cast	Genre	Studio	Ref.
J U L	7	Badsha The Don	Baba Yadav	Jeet, Nusraat Faria		Jaaz Multimedia, Eskay Movies	
J U L	7	Mental	Shamim Ahamed Roni	Shakib Khan, Tisha		Riddhi Talkies	
J U L	7	Samraat: The King Is Here	Mohammad Mostafa Kamal Raz	Shakib Khan, Apu Biswas		Tiger Media Limited	
J U L	7	Shikari	Joydip Mukherjee, Jakir Hossain Simanto	Shakib Khan, Srabanti Chatterjee		Jaaz Multimedia, Eskay Movies	
A U G	5	Aral	Shahed Chowdhury	Shahriaz, Achol, Bipasha Kabir	Action, thriller		
A U G	12	Niyoti	Jakir Hossain Raju	Arifin Shuvoo, Jolly		Jaaz Multimedia	
A U G	19	Mastani	Firoz Khan Prince	Kazi Maruf, Moushumi Hamid	Action, thriller		
A U G	19	Oggatonama	Tauquir Ahmed	Shahiduzzaman Selim, Mosharraf Karim, Fazlur Rahman Babu, Nipun Akter, Abul Hayat		Impress Telefilm	
A U G	27	Ek Jabaner Zamindar Har Gelen Ebar	Uttam Akash	Amin Khan, Sylvie, Humayun Faridi			
S E P	2	Poush Maser Pirit	Nargis Akhter	Sadika Parvin Popy, Tony Dias		Femcom Bangladesh	
S E P	13	Bossgiri	Shamim Ahamed Roni	Shakib Khan, Shabnom Bubly	Romance, thriller	Khan Films	
S E P	13	Rokto	Wajed Ali Sumon	Ziaul Roshan, Pori Moni	Action	Jaaz Multimedia, Eskay Movies	
S E P	13	Shooter	Raju Chowdhury	Shakib Khan, Shabnom Bubly	Action, romance	Sunan Movies	
S E P	30	Aynabaji	Amitabh Reza Chowdhury	Chanchal Chowdhury, Nabila, Partha Barua	Thriller		

=== October–December ===
Opening		Title	Director	Cast	Genre	Studio	Ref.
O C T	7	Prem Ki Bujhini	Abdul Aziz, Sudipto Sarkar	Om, Subhashree Ganguly, Jannatul Ferdoush Peya	Romance, thriller	Jaaz Multimedia, Eskay Movies	
O C T	14	Chokher Dekha	PA Kajol	Symon Sadik, Ahona			
O C T	21	One Way: Ek Rasta	Iftakar Chowdhury	Bappy Chowdhury, Anisur Rahman Milon, Bobby	Action, thriller	The Address	
N O V	11	Valobasapur	Ekhlas Abedin	Moniraj Khan, Arna, Shishir Ahmed		Jackfruit Multimedia	
N O V	18	Jodi Tumi Jante	Nadi, Ketab Ali Firoz	Tania Brishty, Ashraf Titu		Eurobangla Entertainment Press	
D E C	2	Prithibir Niyoti	Sheikh Shamim				
D E C	9	Dhumketu	Shafiq Hasan	Shakib Khan, Pori Moni, Amit Hasan			
D E C	16	Ami Tomar Hote Chai	Anonno Mamun	Bappy Chowdhury, Bidya Sinha Saha Mim		Live Technologies	
D E C	16	Lal Sobujer Sur	Mushfikur Rahman Guljar	Omar Sani, Subrata, Shera Zaman, Rafiqullah Selim, Jhuna Chowdhury	Historical drama		
D E C	21	Ekattorer Nishan	Taher Shipon	Rasel Ahmed, Fazlur Rahman Babu, Monira Mithu	Children's historical drama		(Note: Ekattorer Nishan was broadcast in three parts on Channel i from 21 through 23 December. Despite the lack of a theatrical release, reliable sources classify it as a 2016 film. It was selected for consideration in the 2016 Bangladesh National Film Awards, but did not receive an award.)
D E C	23	Ek Prithibi Prem	SA Haque Alik	Asif Noor, Airin			

== See also ==
- 2016 in Bangladesh
