= List of Bangladeshi films of 2013 =

This is a list of Bangladeshi films that was released in 2013.

== January–March ==
Opening		Title	Director	Cast	Genre	Notes	Ref.
J A N	11	Bhalobasar Bandhan	M B Reza	Aman, Anna, Shajid, Tithi	Romance		
J A N	25	Television	Mostofa Sarwar Farooki	Shahir Huda Rumi, Chanchal Chowdhury, Mosharraf Karim, Nusrat Imrose Tisha	Drama		
F E B	1	Jor Kore Bhalobasha Hoy Na	Shahadat Hossain Liton	Shakib Khan, Sahara, Mukti, Misha Sawdagor	Romance		
F E B	15	Devdas	Chashi Nazrul Islam	Shakib Khan, Apu Biswas, Moushumi, Shahiduzzaman Selim, Ahmed Sharif	Drama, romance	Based on Sharat Chandra Chattopadhyay's novel Devdas	
F E B	15	Onnorokom Bhalobasha	Shahin Sumon	Bappy Chowdhury, Mahiya Mahi, Amit Hasan, Sara Jerin	Romance		
F E B	22	Antordhan	Syed Wahiduzzaman Diamond	Ferdous Ahmed, Nipun Akter	Drama		
M A R C H	1	Jibon Nodir Tire	Monir Hossain Mithu	Nirab Hossain, Anan	Romance		
M A R C H	1	Pagol Tor Jonno Re	Mayeen Biswas	Irfan Khan, Tamanna, Omar Sani	Romance		
M A R C H	1	Simanaheen	Kevin Dalvi, Ria Mahtab	Rahsaan Islam, Ismat Alamgir	Romance		
M A R C H	15	Attoghatok	Palash Parvez	Shoyeb Khan, Rafid Khan, Keya	Action		
M A R C H	22	Shiri Forhad	Gazi Mahbub	Riaz, Shabnur	Romance, drama		
M A R C H	26	Hridoye 71	Sadeq Siddiqui	Mamnun Hasan Emon, Romana, Shahidul Islam Shacchu	Drama	Premiered on ATN Bangla	
M A R C H	29	Kosto Amar Duniya	Satya Ranjan Romance	Ratna, Siraj Haidar, Apon Chowdhury, Kazi Hayat	Action, romance		

== April–June ==
Opening		Title	Director	Cast	Genre	Notes	Ref.
A P R I L	5	Sei Tumi Anamika	Sarwar Hossain	Shoyeb Khan, Rashed Khan, Shahrin, Mehrun	Romance		
A P R I L	12	Dehorokkhi: The Bodyguard	Iftakar Chowdhury	Anisur Rahman Milon, Bobby, Kazi Maruf	Action		
A P R I L	19	Shikhandi Kotha	Mohammad Hannan	Mohammad Hannan, Rokeya Prachi, Jayanta Chattapaddhay	Drama		
A P R I L	26	Matir Pinjira	S M Shahnewaz Shanu	Shahed Chowdhury, Raisul Islam Asad, Shampa, Pijush Bandhapaddhay	Drama, romance		
M A Y	10	Judge Barrister Police Commissioner	F.I Manik	Shakib Khan, Purnima, Razzak	Action, drama, romance		
M A Y	17	Jotil Prem	Shaheen Sumon	Bappy Chowdhury, Achol, Ilias Kanchan, Champa, Misha Sawdagor	Romance		
M A Y	24	Eito Bhalobasha	Shahin Kabir Tutul	Mamnun Hasan Emon, Nirob, Nipun Akter, Siddiqur Rahman	Comedy, romance		
M A Y	31	Nishpap Munna	Badiul Alam Khokon	Shakib Khan, Sahara, Misha Sawdagor, Bapparaz	Action, romance		
J U N E	7	Romeo 2013	Raju Chowdhury	Bappy Chowdhury, Sara Jerin	Romance		
J U N E	14	PoraMon	Jakir Hossain Raju	Symon Sadik, Mahiya Mahi, Ali Raz, Anisur Rahman Milon, Misha Sawdagor	Romance		
J U N E	21	Prem Prem Paglaami	Shafi Uddin Shafi	Bappy Chowdhury, Achol, Amit Hasan, Kazi Hayat	Romance		
J U N E	28	Tomar Majhe Ami	Shafiqul Islam Sohel	Nirab, Toma Mirza, Sadeq Bacchu	Romance		

== July–September ==
Opening		Title	Director	Cast	Genre	Notes	Ref.
A U G U S T	9	Kajoler Din Ratri	Sajal Khaled	Tarin, Iresh Zaker	Drama	Children's film	
A U G U S T	9	Nishwartha Bhalobasa	Ananta Jalil	Ananta Jalil, Afiea Nusrat Barsha, Razzak, Misha Sawdagor	Romance, action		
A U G U S T	9	My Name Is Khan	Badiul Alam Khokon	Shakib Khan, Apu Biswas, Prabir Mitra, Misha Sawdagor	Action, romance		
A U G U S T	9	Bhalobasha Aaj Kal	P.A Kajal	Shakib Khan, Mahiya Mahi, Misha Sawdagor, Kabila, Ali Raz	Romance, comedy		
A U G U S T	30	Ek Paye Nupur	Babul Reza	Aman, Anna, Amir Siraji, Gulshan Ara	Romance		
A U G U S T	30	Er Beshi Bhalobasha Jay Na	Jakir Hossain Raju	Symon Sadik, Nijhum, Sohel Khan	Romance		
S E P T E M B E R	6	Kumari Maa	Shahdat Hossain Liton	Nirab Hossain, Tuli, Asif Iqbal, Munmun	Romance, drama		
S E P T E M B E R	6	Notun Shat Bhai Champa	Mizanur Rahman	Sheikh Mizan, Karishma	Drama		
S E P T E M B E R	6	Eve Teasing	Kazi Hayat	Kazi Maruf, Toma Mirza, Kazi Hayat	Action, drama		
S E P T E M B E R	6	Mrittika Maya	Gazi Rakayet	Raisul Islam Asad, Pijush Bandhapaddhay, Mamunur Rashid,	Drama		
S E P T E M B E R	13	Dhaka to Bombay	Uttam Akash	Shakib Khan, Sahara, Omar Sani, Suchorita	Action, drama		
S E P T E M B E R	13	Rupgawal	Habibur Rahman Habib	Masum Aziz, Niloy Alamgir, Shimla, Champa	Drama, romance		
S E P T E M B E R	20	Mon Tor Jonno Pagol	Hanif Reza Milon	Kayes Arju, Sanjana, Habib Khan	Romance		
S E P T E M B E R	20	Kisu Asha Kisu Bhalobasha	Mostafizur Rahman Manik	Ferdous Ahmed, Moushumi, Shabnur, Happy	Romance		
S E P T E M B E R	27	Banglar Paglu	Kishor Saha	Abhi, Priyanka, Kabila, Aritra	Action, romance	Indo-Bangladesh co-production film	
S E P T E M B E R	27	Tobuo Bhalobashi	Montazur Rahman Akbar	Bappy Chowdhury, Mahiya Mahi, Sohel Rana, Amit Hasan, Parveen Sultana Diti	Romance		

== October–December ==
Opening		Title	Director	Cast	Genre	Notes	Ref.
O C T O B E R	4	Udhao - Runaway	Amit Ashraf	Monir Ahmed, Nawshaba Ahmed, Shahed Ali, Animesh Aich	Crime, drama	American Bangladeshi film	
O C T O B E R	16	Purno Doirgho Prem Kahini	Shafi Uddin Shafi	Shakib Khan, Joya Ahsan, Arifin Shuvoo	Romance		
O C T O B E R	16	Full and Final	Malek Afsari	Shakib Khan, Bobby, Amit Hasan	Action		
O C T O B E R	16	Premik Number One	Rokibul Islam Rokib	Shakib Khan, Apu Biswas, Nipun Akter, Dilip Chakrabarty, Bobita, Milon	Romance		
O C T O B E R	16	Ki Prem Dekhaila	Shah Muhammad Songhram	Bappy Chowdhury, Achol, Ali Raz, Bobita	Romance		
O C T O B E R	16	Anishchit Jatra	Belal Ahmed	Abul Kalam Azad, Momena Chowdhury, Dilip Chakrabarty, Anisur Rahman Milon	Drama		
O C T O B E R	20	Akoi Britte	Kazi Morshed	Najnin Chumki, Tauquir Ahmed, Khalil, Raisul Islam Asad, Dolly Jahur	Drama		
N O V	8	Ayna Kahini	Razzak	Somrat, Keya, Sohel Khan, Razzak	Romance, drama		
N O V	8	Valobasha Zindabad	Debashish Biswas	Arifin Shuvoo, Airin Sultana, Sadek Bacchu	Romance		
N O V	15	Inchi Inchi Prem	Raju Chowdhury	Bappy Chowdhury, Bobby, Sohel Khan	Action, drama		
N O V	22	Tomar Achi Tomari Thakbo	Kalam Kaisar	Shrabon Khan, Nirjana, Moumita, Prabir Mitra, Khaleda Akter Kolpona	Romance		
D E C	13	Padma Parer Parboti	Rafiq Sikder	Nipun Akter, Mamnun Hasan Emon, Nirab Hossain, Jayanta Chattopadhyay	Romance		
D E C	20	71 er Guerrilla	Mizanur Rahman Shamim	Sohel Rana, Khaleda Akter Kolpona, Alexandar Bo	Drama		

== See also ==
- List of Bangladeshi films of 2014
- List of Bangladeshi films
- Cinema of Bangladesh
