= List of Bangladeshi films of 2022 =

2022 saw the release of numerous notable Bangladeshi films that were originally scheduled for release in 2020 or 2021, but were postponed due to the COVID-19 pandemic, releasing theatrically, on video on demand or on streaming services.

Some films listed have announced release dates but have yet to begin filming, while others are in production but do not yet have definite release dates. Films listed as "untitled" do not yet have publicly announced titles.

== Box office collection ==
The top ten highest-grossing Bangladeshi films released in 2022, by worldwide box office gross revenue, are as follows.

Highest-grossing films of 2022
Rank	Title	Production company / distributor	Domestic gross	Worldwide gross	Ref.
1	Hawa	Anjan Chowdhury Pintu / Jaaz Multimedia, Swapno Scarecrow	৳14 crore (US$1.1 million)	৳16.35 crore (US$1.3 million)	
2	Poran	Live Technologies / The Abhi Kathachitra	৳12.00 crore (US$980,000)		
3	Golui	Khorshed Alam Khasru / ToT Films, Bioscope films	৳6 crore (US$490,000)		
4	Shaan	MA Rahim / Quick Multimedia, Jaaz Multimedia	৳2.31 crore (US$190,000)		
As of 30 October 2022

== January–March ==
Opening		Title	Production company	Cast and crew	Ref.
J A N U A R Y	14	Chitmahal	Impress Telefilm Limited	Habibur Rahman Habib (director), Moushumi Hamid, Peya Jannatul, Shimul Khan	
J A N U A R Y	27	Taan	Chorki	Raihan Rafi (director), Siam Ahmed, Shobnom Bubly	
F E B R U A R Y	11	Shoshurbari Zindabad 2	Bengal Multimedia Limited	Debashish Biswas (director), Apu Biswas, Bappy Chowdhury	
F E B R U A R Y	18	Mafia: Part 1	Shapla Media	Touhid Hassan Chowdhury (director), Emon, Achol, Misha Sawdagor, Zahid Hasan, Anisur Rahman Milon, Shiba Shanu	
M A R C H	4				
M A R C H	4	Mukhosh	Government of Bangladesh	Efthakhar Suvo (director), Mosharraf Karim, Porimoni, Sariful Razz, Iresh Zaker	
M A R C H	11				
M A R C H	11	Gunin	Chorki	Giasuddin Selim (director), Azad Abul Kalam, Porimoni, Ziaul Roshan, Iresh Zaker	
M A R C H	11	Shimu	Rubaiyat Hossain films	Rubaiyat Hossain (director), Rikita Nandini Shimu, Shahana Goswami, Novera Rahman Dipannita Martin, Shatabdi Wadud, Mostafa Monwar	
M A R C H	25				
M A R C H	25	Lockdown Love Story	Shapla Media	Shah Alam Mondal (director), Emon, Rehnuma Mostafa	
M A R C H	25	Jaal Cherar Somoy		Sazzad Haider (director), Ashiq, Anjali	
M A R C H	28				
M A R C H	28	Tor Majhei Amar Prem		MK Zaman (director), Rahat Rauf, Rose	

== April–June ==
Opening		Title	Production company	Cast and crew	Ref.
M A Y	3	Shaan	Quick Multimedia, Jaaz Multimedia	MA Rahim (director); Siam Ahmed, Puja Cherry Roy, Taskeen Rahman	
M A Y	3	Bidrohi	Shapla Media	Shaheen Sumon (director), Shakib Khan, Shobnom Bubly	
M A Y	3	Golui	Khorshed Alam Khosru Productions	SA Haque Alik (director), Shakib Khan, Puja Cherry	
M A Y	3	Boddo Bhalobashi	Sultana Rose Nipa	Jewel Farsi (director), Shanto, Sultana Rose Nipa	
M A Y	3	Floor Number 7	Chorki	Raihan Rafi (director), Toma Mirza, Shobnom Bubly, Sumon Anwar, Shahriar Nazim Joy	
M A Y	20	Paap Punno	Impress Telefilm Limited	Giasuddin Selim (director); Afsana Mimi, Siam Ahmed, Farzana Chumki	
J U N E	3	Agamikal	The Ovi Kothachitra, Masud Mancha Production	Anjan Aich (director), Zakia Bari Momo, Mamnun Emon	
J U N E	10	Bikkhov	Shapla Media	Shamim Ahamed Roni (director), Shanto Khan, Srabanti Chatterjee	
J U N E	10	Amanush	iTheatre	Anonno Mamun (director), Nirab, Mithila, Misha Sawdagor, Rashed Mamun Apu	
J U N E	17	Talash	Cleopatra Films	Saikat Nasir (director); Ador Azad, Bubly, Asif Ahsan Khan	

== July–September ==
Opening		Title	Production company	Cast and crew	Ref.
J U L Y	8				
J U L Y	8	Karnish	Impress Telefilms	Vicky Zahed (director); Bidya, Roshan	
J U L Y	8	Ja Hariye Jay	Impress Telefilms	Syed Salahuddin Zaki (director); Afzal Hossain	
J U L Y	10				
J U L Y	10	Din–The Day	Monsoon Films	Morteza Atashzamzam (director); Ananta Jalil, Afiea Nusrat Barsha	
J U L Y	10	Poran	Live Technologies	Raihan Rafi (director); Bidya Sinha Saha Mim, Sariful Razz and Yash Rohan	
J U L Y	10	Psycho	iTheatre	Anonno Mamun (director); Puja Cherry, Ziaul Roshan	
J U L Y	29				
J U L Y	29	Hawa	Facecard Productions, Sun Music and Motion Pictures Limited	Mejbaur Rahman Sumon (director); Chanchal Chowdhury, Sariful Razz, Nazifa Tushi, Shohel Mondol	
A U G U S T	11				
A U G U S T	11	Shuklopokkho	Chorki	Vicky Zahed (director), Ziaul Roshan, Sunerah Binte Kamal, Khairul Bashar	
A U G U S T	26				
A U G U S T	26	Ashirbad	Jennifer Ferdous	Mostafizur Rahman Manik (director), Ziaul Roshan, Mahiya Mahi	
S E P T E B E R	2				
S E P T E B E R	2	Bhaiyare	Jaaz Multimedia	Rakibul Alam Rakib (director), Rasel Mia, Elina Shammi	
S E P T E B E R	9				
S E P T E B E R	9	Live	Shapla Media	Shamim Ahamed Roni (director), Symon Sadik, Mahiya Mahi	
S E P T E B E R	15				
S E P T E B E R	15	Niswas	Chorki	Raihan Rafi (director), Tasnia Farin	
S E P T E B E R	16				
S E P T E B E R	16	Birotto	Ping Pong Entertainment	Saidul Islam Rana (director), Emon, Salwa	
S E P T E B E R	23				
S E P T E B E R	23	Operation Sundarbans	RAB Welfare Cooperative Society Ltd.	Dipankar Dipon (director), Siam Ahmed, Ziaul Roshan, Nusraat Faria	
S E P T E B E R	23	The Beauty Circus	Impress Telefilm	Mahmud Didar (director), Jaya Ahsan, Ferdous, Tauquir Ahmed	
S E P T E B E R	30	Isha Kha	SG Production	Dayel Rahman (director), DA Tayeb, Apu Biswas	

== October–December ==
Opening		Title	Production company	Cast and crew	Ref.
O C T O B E R	7				
O C T O B E R	7	Jao Pakhi Bolo Tare	Cleopatra Films	Mostafizur Rahman Manik (director), Ador Azad, Rashed Mamun Apu, Mahiya Mahi	
O C T O B E R	7	Hridita		Ispahani Arif Jahan (director), Puja Cherry, ABM Sumon	
O C T O B E R	13				
O C T O B E R	13	Dui Diner Duniya	Chorki	Anam Biswas (director), Chanchal Chowdhury, Fazlur Rahman Babu	
O C T O B E R	14				
O C T O B E R	14	Raagi		Mizanur Rahman Mizan (director), Abir Chowdhury, Achol, Moumita Mou	
O C T O B E R	21				
O C T O B E R	21	Rohingya	Shabnam Shehnaz Chowdhury	Syed Wahiduzzaman Diamond (director), Omar Ayaz Oni, Arshi Hossain, Saddam Hossain	
O C T O B E R	21	Bosonto Bikel	RBS Tech Limited	Rafique Sikder (director), Shipon Mitra, Shah Humayra Subah, Omar Sani	
O C T O B E R	21	Jibon Pakhi	Gunoboti Films	Asad Sarkar (director), Azad Abul Kalam, Mohona Mim, Sujon Habib	
O C T O B E R	28				
O C T O B E R	28	Damal	Impress Telefilm	Raihan Rafi (director), Siam Ahmed, Bidya Sinha Mim, Sariful Razz	
N O V E M B E R	4				
N O V E M B E R	4	Kura Pokkhir Shunne Ura		Muhammad Kayyum (director), Joyita Mahlanbish, Ujjal Kabir Himu	
N O V E M B E R	10				
N O V E M B E R	10	Daag	Chorki	Sanjay Samaddar (director), Mosharraf Karim, Nishat Priom	
N O V E M B E R	11				
N O V E M B E R	11	Deshantor		Aashutosh Sujon (director), Moushumi, Ahmed Rubel	
N O V E M B E R	11	Bhangon		Mirza Shakhwat Hossain (director), Moushumi, Fazlur Rahman Babu	
N O V E M B E R	18				
N O V E M B E R	18	Made in Chittagong		Imraul Rafat (director), Partha Barua, Aparna Ghosh	
N O V E M B E R	25				
N O V E M B E R	25	Birkonya Pritilata		Pradip Ghosh (director), Nusrat Imrose Tisha, Manoj Pramanik	
N O V E M B E R	25	Oh my love		Abul Kalam Azad (director), Riddhish, Saborni Roy	
D E C E M B E R	2				
D E C E M B E R	2	Hudson's Gun		Prasant Adhikari (director), Lutfur Rahman George, Moushumi Hamid	
D E C E M B E R	16				
D E C E M B E R	16	Joy Bangla	Tungipara Films	Kazi Hayat (director), Bappy Chowdhury, Zahara Mitu	
D E C E M B E R	16	Ekattorer Ekkhondo Itihash		Mizanur Rahman Shamim (director), Masum Parvez Rubel	
D E C E M B E R	19				
D E C E M B E R	19	Mayashalik	Binge	Shihab Shaheen (director), Ziaul Faruq Apurba, Sadia Ayman	
D E C E M B E R	22				
D E C E M B E R	22	Cafe Desire	Chorki	Robiul Alam Robi (director)	
D E C E M B E R	23				
D E C E M B E R	23	Direct Attack	Sadek Siddique	Sadek Siddique (director), Amin Khan, Sadika Parvin Popy	
D E C E M B E R	23	Payer Chhap	Impress Telefilm	Saiful Islam Mannu (director), Meghla Mukta, Deepanwita Martin, Pran Ray	
D E C E M B E R	23	Kagoj	Addrian Productions	Ali Zulfikar Zahedi (director), Mamnun Hasan Emon, Airin Sultana, Maimuna Momo	
D E C E M B E R	30				
D E C E M B E R	30	Birangona 71	SS Film International	M Shakhwat Hossain (director), Shirin Shila, Shahed Sharif Khan	
D E C E M B E R	30	Megh Roddur Khela	M. M. Ispahani Limited	Awal Reza (director), Toitoi Helali, Ornima Tabassum	

== See also ==
- List of Bangladeshi films of 2023
- List of Bangladeshi films of 2021
- List of Bangladeshi films of 2020
- List of Bangladeshi films
- Cinema of Bangladesh
