= Tiger Media =

Bangladeshi film production and distribution company

Tiger Media Limited
- Company type: Film production
- Industry: Entertainment, music
- Founded: 2014; 12 years ago
- Successor: The Abhi Kathachitra (Sister project)
- Headquarters: Kakrail, Dhaka, Bangladesh
- Key people: Zahid Hasan Abhi (CEO)
- Products: Motion pictures, music publishing
- Services: Studio production, marketing and distribution
- Owner: Zahid Hasan Abhi
- Website: mytigernow.com

Tiger Media Limited; established in 2014 is a Bangladeshi film production, distribution company and music label. It specializes in film production, and distribution. Zahid Hasan Abhi is the owner of the film production and distribution company. He also owner of the film production and distribution company The Abhi Kathachitra.

== As distributor ==
Following are the list of notable films produced and distributed by Tiger Media Limited.

Year	Film	Director	Cast	Notes	Ref.
2014	Hero: The Superstar	Badiul Alam Khokon	Shakib Khan, Apu Biswas, Eamin Haque Bobby		
2014	Shopno Je Tui	Monirul Islam Sohel	Mamnun Hasan Emon, Achol		
2015	Gunda - The Terrorist	Ispahani Arif Jahan	Bappy Chowdhury Achol, Amrita Khan		
2015	Action Jasmine	Iftakar Chowdhury	Bobby Haque, Symon Sadik, Kabila		
2015	Dui Prithibi	FI Manik	Shakib Khan, Apu Biswas, Ahona Rahman		
2015	Antaranga	Chashi Nazrul Islam	Emon Alisha Pradhan		
2015	Ajob Prem	Wazed Ali Sumon	Bappy Chowdhury Achol		
2015	Black Money	Shafi Uddin Shafi	Symon Sadik, Moushumi Hamid, Keya		
2015	Warning	Shafi Uddin Shafi	Arifin Shuvoo, Mahiya Mahi		
2016	Sweetheart	Wajed Ali	Riaz Uddin Ahamed Siddique, Bappy Chowdhury, Bidya Sinha Saha Mim		
2016	Musafir	Ashiqur Rahman	Arifin Shuvoo, Marjan Jenifa, Misha Sawdagor		
2017	Dhaka Attack	Dipankar Dipon	Arifin Shuvoo Mahiya Mahi		
2017	Haldaa	Tauquir Ahmed	Mosharraf Karim, Nusrat Imrose Tisha		
2022	Talash	Saikat Nasir	Ador Azad, Shobnom Bubly, Asif Ahmed Khan		
2022	Mukhosh	Efthakhar Shuvo	Mosharraf Karim, Pori Moni, Ziaul Roshan		
2022	Birotto	Saidur Rahman Rana	Emon, Nipun Akter, Nishat Nawar Salwa		
2023	Local	Saif Chandan	Ador Azad, Shobnom Bubly		
2023	Lal Shari	Bandhan Biswas	Symon Sadik, Apu Biswas, Sumit Sengupta		
2023	Shatru	Sumon Dhar	Bappy Chowdhury, Zahara Mitu		
2023	Priyotoma	Himel Ashraf	Shakib Khan, Idhika Paul		
2024	Deyaler Desh	Mishuk Moni	Sariful Razz, Bubly		
2024	Shonar Chor	Jahangir Sikder	Zayed Khan, Snigdha, Moushumi, Omar Sani		
2024	Lipstick	Kamruzzaman Roman	Ador Azad, Puja Cherry		
2024	Meghna Konna	Fuad Chowdhury	Sazzad Hossain, Samonti Shoumi, Kazi Nawshaba Ahmed		
2025	Boli – The Wrestler	Iqbal Hossain Chowdhury	Nasir Uddin Khan, Priyam Archi, AKM Itmam, Angel Noor		
2025	Tagar	Aalok Hasan	Ador Azad, Puja Cherry		
2025	NeelChokro	Mithu Khan	Arifin Shuvoo, Mondira Chakraborty		
2025	Insaaf	Sanjoy Somaddar	Sariful Razz, Tasnia Farin, Mosharraf Karim		
2025	Esha Murder: Karmaphal	Sunny Sanwar	Azmeri Haque Badhon, Puja Cruze		
2025	Uraal	Jobaidur Rahman	Mahafuz Munna, Sohel Towfiq, Santa Chandra Sutradhar, Kabyakatha		
2025	Noor	Raihan Rafi	Arifin Shuvoo, Jannatul Ferdous Oishee	Webfilm on Bioscope+	

== As producer ==
Year	Film	Director	Cast	Notes	Ref.
2014	Kistimaat	Ashiqur Rahman	Arifin Shuvoo, Achol, Misha Sawdagor		
2016	Samraat: The King Is Here	Mohammad Mostafa Kamal Raz	Shakib Khan, Apu Biswas, Indraneil Sengupta	Co-produced with Orkee Production and Cinemawala	
2024	Agontuk	Sumon Dhar	Shamol Mawla, Puja Cherry		
2018	Bhalo Theko	Jakir Hossain Raju	Arifin Shuvoo, Tanha Tasnia Islam		
2022	Eida Kopal	Raihan Rafi	Mahiya Mahi, Shahed Ali, Harunur Rashid	Short film	
2025	Jongli	M. Rahim	Siam Ahmed, Shobnom Bubly, Prarthana Fardin Dighi	Co-produced with MIB Studios	

== See also ==
- Cinema of Bangladesh
- Indo-Bangladesh Joint Venture
- Jaaz Multimedia
- Fatman Films
