= Emon Saha discography =

Emon Saha was a Bangladeshi film score composer. He has composed for 114 films. The following is a complete list of films he has scored for:

== 1990s ==
| Year | Album | Notes |
|---|---|---|
| 1996 | Poradhin | |
| 1997 | Shopner Nayok | |
| 1999 | Sobar Ajante | |

== 2000s ==
| Year | Film | Notes |
|---|---|---|
| 2000 | Goriber Somman | |
| 2000 | Karishma | |
| 2000 | Premer Naam Bedona | |
| 2000 | Shot Bhai | |
| 2000 | Tomar Jonyo Pagol | |
| 2001 | Dil To Pagol | |
| 2001 | Kokhono Megh Kokhono Brishti | |
| 2001 | Meghla Akash | |
| 2001 | Mejaj Gorom | |
| 2001 | Moron Niye Khela | |
| 2001 | Mukhoshdhari | |
| 2001 | Shikari | |
| 2001 | Shopner Bashor | |
| 2002 | Arman | |
| 2002 | Bhalobasha Kare Koy | |
| 2002 | Bou Hobo | |
| 2002 | Lal Doriya | Winner: Bangladesh National Film Award for Best Music Composer |
| 2002 | Oder Dhor | |
| 2002 | Pordeshi Babu | |
| 2002 | Shoshurbari Zindabad | |
| 2002 | Streer Morjada | |
| 2002 | Sundori Bodhu | |
| 2003 | Baba | |
| 2003 | Kheya Ghater Majhi | |
| 2003 | Kokhono Megh Kokhono Brishti | |
| 2003 | Noyon Bhora Jol | |
| 2003 | Praner Manush | |
| 2003 | Satyer Bijoy | |
| 2003 | Shahoshi Manush Chai | penned lyrics also |
| 2003 | Stree Keno Shotru | |
| 2004 | Jibon Ek Songhorsho | |
| 2004 | Jiboner Guarantee Nai | |
| 2004 | Khairun Sundari | |
| 2004 | Prem Korechi Besh Korechi | |
| 2004 | Shasti | |
| 2005 | Agun Amar Naam | |
| 2005 | Bondhok | |
| 2005 | Char Sotiner Ghor | |
| 2005 | Meher Nigar | |
| 2005 | Molla Barir Bou | |
| 2005 | Phuler Moto Bou | |
| 2005 | Tok Jhal Mishti | |
| 2006 | Banglar Hero | |
| 2006 | Dajjal Shashuri | |
| 2006 | Dadima | |
| 2006 | Hridoyer Kotha | |
| 2006 | Koti Takar Kabin | |
| 2007 | Ami Bachte Chai | |
| 2007 | Dhoka | |
| 2007 | Doctor Bari | |
| 2007 | Jomela Sundori | |
| 2007 | Jomer Sathe Juddho | |
| 2007 | Shajghor | |
| 2007 | Shotru Shotru Khela | |
| 2008 | Ghorer Lokkhi | |
| 2008 | Koti Takar Fokir | |
| 2008 | Mone Prane Acho Tumi | composed along with Ahmed Imtiaz Bulbul |
| 2008 | Pita Matar Amanat | |
| 2008 | Tumi Amar Prem | |
| 2009 | Bonde Maya Lagaichhe | with one song composed by Shah Abdul Karim |
| 2009 | Gangajatra | |
| 2009 | Mayer Hate Beheshter Chabi | |
| 2009 | Shaheb Name Golam | |
| 2009 | Tumi Amar Swami | |

== 2010s ==
| Year | Film | Notes |
|---|---|---|
| 2010 | Chachchu Amar Chachchu | |
| 2010 | Golapi Ekhon Bilatey | Winner: Bachsas Award for Best Music Director |
| 2010 | Jibon Moroner Sathi | |
| 2010 | Khoj: The Search | |
| 2010 | Mughal-e-Azam | |
| 2010 | Ora Amake Bhalo Hote Dilona | |
| 2010 | Top Hero | |
| 2011 | Amar Bondhu Rashed | |
| 2011 | Chupi Chupi | |
| 2011 | Kusum Kusum Prem | |
| 2011 | Matir Thikana | composed along with Ahmed Imtiaz Bulbul |
| 2012 | Ghetuputro Komola | |
| 2012 | Hothat Sedin | |
| 2012 | Tomar Sukh Ee Amar Sukh | |
| 2013 | Bhalobasha Aaj Kal | |
| 2013 | Devdas | |
| 2013 | Premik Number One | |
| 2014 | '71 Er Maa Jononi | |
| 2014 | Ek Cup Cha | |
| 2015 | Aro Bhalobashbo Tomay | |
| 2015 | Dui Prithibi | |
| 2016 | Angaar | |
| 2016 | Bossgiri | |
| 2017 | Apon Manush | |
| 2017 | Gohin Baluchor | |
| 2017 | Meyeti Ekhon Kothay Jabe | |
| 2018 | Ekti Cinemar Golpo | |
| 2018 | PoraMon 2 | |
| 2018 | Premer Keno Fashi | |
| 2021 | Bishwoshundori | |
| 2021 | Chironjeeb Mujib | |
| 2021 | Mridha Vs Mridha | |
| 2022 | Rohingya | |
| 2022 | Tungiparar Miya Bhai | |
| 2023 | Lal Shari | |
| 2023 | Prohelika | |
| Upcoming | August 1975 | |
| Upcoming | Agami | |
| Upcoming | Unmad | |
| Upcoming | Shyamakalpo | |
| Upcoming | Chhayabrikkho | |
| Upcoming | Shoshurbari Zindabad 2 | |
| Upcoming | Ashirbad | |
| Upcoming | MR-9 | |

== Unreleased ==
| Album | Notes |
|---|---|
| † Detective | |

== Year unknown ==
| Film | Notes |
|---|---|
| Aporadhi | |
| Gorom Mosla | |
| Taser Ghor | |

== Background score only ==
| Year | Film | Score Composer | Notes |
|---|---|---|---|
| 2022 | Golui | Habib Wahid and Emon Saha | |

== Non-film songs ==
| Year | Album/Single | Song | Writer(s) | Singer(s) |
|---|---|---|---|---|
| 1972 | Single | "O Amar Bangla Maa Tor" | | Sabina Yasmin |
| N/A | Yeh Dil Tumhi Ko Diya | "Tumhi Ho Meri Aarzoo" | | Sabina Yasmin |
| N/A | Yeh Dil Tumhi Ko Diya | "Main Kya Karu" | | Sabina Yasmin |
| N/A | Single | "Ekta Golap Hate Niye" | Zia Ahmed Sheli | Andrew Kishore |

=== Songs for television ===
| Year | Show | Song | Songwriter(s) | Singer(s) |
|---|---|---|---|---|
| 1978 | Bangladesh Television | "Prothom Bangladesh Amar Shesh Bangladesh" | Moniruzzaman Monir | Shahnaz Rahmatullah |
| N/A | Anandamela | "Je Chhilo Drishtir Simanay" | | Shahnaz Rahmatullah |
| N/A | Bornali | "Surjodoye Tumi" | Moniruzzaman Monir | Syed Abdul Hadi |
| N/A | Manik Chor (drama) | "Bondhu Teen Din" | Amjad Hossain | Runa Laila |
