= Kagojer Bou (film) =

- Poster of the film
- Bengali: কাগজের বউ
- Directed by: Chayanika Chowdhury
- Story by: Kamal Sarker
- Produced by: Mahbuba Shahreen
- Starring: D.A. Tayeb; Pori Moni; Mamnun Hasan Emon; Sumon Mahmud; Abul Hayat; Dilara Zaman
- Production company: Polash Cine Production
- Release date: 19 January 2024
- Running time: 112 minutes
- Country: Bangladesh
- Language: Bengali

Kagojer Bou (Paper Wife) is a 2024 Bangladeshi family-drama film directed by Chayanika Chowdhury and produced by Mahbuba Shahreen. The film stars D.A. Tayeb, Pori Moni, Mamnun Hasan Emon, Abul Hayat Dilara Zaman And Sumon Mahmud.

It is the second collaboration between D.A. Tayeb and Pori Moni after Shona Bondhu (2017).

== Cast ==
- D.A. Tayeb
- Pori Moni
- Emon
- Abul Hayat
- Dilara Zaman
- Sumon Mahmud
- Anha Tamanna

== Production ==
Initially Mahiya Mahi was selected to play the lead actress in the film, but she dropped the film due to her illness. Later, she was replaced by Pori Moni.

The film's began on December 17, 2021 in Dhaka, Bangladesh.

== Release ==
It was released on January 19, 2024 in 8 theaters clashing with Shesh Bazi and the Indian film Hubba, imported to Bangladesh.
