= Faand: The Trap =

- Movie poster
- Bengali: ফাঁদ: দ্য ট্র‍্যাপ
- Directed by: Shafi Uddin Shafi
- Screenplay by: Shafi Uddin Shafi
- Story by: Chatku Ahmed
- Produced by: Shafiqul Islam Rasel
- Starring: Shakib Khan; Achol Akhe; Amit Hasan
- Cinematography: Asaduzzaman Mojnu
- Edited by: Touhid Hossain Chowdhury
- Music by: Kabir Bakul
- Production company: Othoi Movies
- Distributed by: Othoi Movies
- Release date: 30 May 2014
- Running time: 130 minutes
- Country: Bangladesh
- Language: Bengali

Faand: The Trap is a 2014 Bangladeshi romantic action film, directed by Shafi Uddin Shafi and produced by Shafiqul Islam Rasel under the banner of Othoi Movies. The film encompasses love and patriotism, mainly focused on nationalism and the relationship of the lead characters. It features superstar Shakib Khan and Achol Ankhi in the lead roles. It also features Amit Hasan, Kazi Hayat, Rebeka Rouf, Don and Jammy Ibrahim in support roles.

"One of the main focus of the film is about trapping international criminals and rescuing national property, that is where the inspiration of the title came from."

— Shafi Uddin Shafi about the title of the film.

It is the first collaboration between Khan and Achol. It was released on 30 May 2014. Although the film was discussed throughout the year, it failed commercially at the box office.

== Synopsis ==
Famous Bangladeshi scientist Muntasir Mamun (Kazi Hayat) has invented a nuclear atomic formula which can generate electricity. But an international criminal Usman (Amit Hasan) has his evil eyes on the formula. He takes the disc of the formula killing the scientist and gets arrested by Bangladesh Intelligence while leaving Bangladesh for Malaysia. But he was cunning enough to put the disc in Nova's (Achol Ankhi) Bag. Bangladesh Police free him consulting with the intelligence officer Rahul (Jammy Ibrahim) to follow him to get the disc. Usman fled to Malaysia in the search for the formula where intelligence officers had the same plan to catch him and they named the assignment, Faand.

== Cast ==
- Shakib Khan as Asif
- Achol Ankhi as Nova
- Amit Hasan as Usman
- Jammy Ibrahim as Rahul
- Anjali as Iva
- Kazi Hayat as Muntassir Mamun, Asif's father
- Rebeka Rouf as Muntassir Mamun's wife, Asif mother
- Roshan as Asif's boss
- Rajib Chowdhury Don

== Production ==
"It is a complicated but entertaining script. It does follow the stereotypical 'boy meets girl' love story, but there is a twist."

— Shafi Uddin Shafi shared his outlook of the film with Dhaka Tribune.

In the beginning of July, 2013 protagonist Shakib Khan went to Malaysia for the shooting of the film, so he could not celebrate Eid al-Fitr.

== Soundtrack ==
Faand: The Trap

Soundtrack album by Kabir Bakul
- Released: October–November, 2015
- Recorded: 2013–14
- Studio: Othoi Movies
- Genre: Film soundtrack
- Length: 19:04
- Language: Bengali
- Label: SIS Music
- Producer: Kabir Bakul

The film's soundtrack is composed and lyrics penned by Kabir Bakul.

Track listing
No.	Title	Singer(s)	Length
1.	"Shikabo Premer ABCD"	Rajib and Shorolipi	4:01
2.	"Life Ta Ekta"	Kishore	2:40
3.	"Shono Priyo Jene Niyo"	Dinat Jahan Munni and Tasif	4:42
4.	"I Love You"	Mohin and Bindia	3:34
5.	"Bonomali Monta Khali"	Mohin and Shoshi	4:07
Total length:			19:04

== Release ==
The film was initially scheduled to release on April 25, 2014. Its release was later postponed due to business slump and heavy heat around the country. Subsequently, it was released on May 30, 2014 in more than 100 theaters.
