= Danny Sidak =

Bangladeshi film actor

- Born: July 27, 1967 (age 58); Shariatpur, Dhaka, Bangladesh
- Occupations: Film actor; director
- Years active: 1986–present

Danny Sidak (born 27 July 1967) is a Bangladeshi film actorvpr and director who predominantly worked in Dhallywood cinema. He made his debut with the film Loraku (1986). He played the role of Superman in the Bangladeshi adaptation of the 1978 film of the same name.

Danny established himself as in negative and leading actor through films like City Terror, Loraku, Sontrash, Loraku Nayok, Orjon, Machine Man, Bir Purush, Shonko Mala, Bojrumusti, Premik Purush, Akorma, Sathi Hara Nagin, Biye Bari, & Ke Ami. In addition, some of his films as a lead actor include Bonzer Raza Tarzan, Goriber Raja Robinhood, Shingho Purush, Alif Laila, Jollad, & Bijli Toofan, as well as his roles as a supporting actor include Goriber Songshar, Otikrom, & Nishpap Bodhu.

== Personal life ==
Danny born on 27 July 1967 on Shariatpur District, Dhaka.

== Career ==
Sidak started his acting career in 1984, in the Shahidul Islam Khokon directed film Loraku which are released in 1986.

He is known for playing a wide range of characters, including negative characters, supporting actors and lead actors, as well as supporting negative characters. He has established himself as one of the most recognisable all-rounders in Dhallywood. His ability to perform dangerous stunts, such as fighting dangerous animals or showcasing his black belt karate skills, has made him notable. He often plays criminals who attack innocent people to make a fortune, wicked men who are allied with the most notorious antagonists and help them in every way, brave men who stand up to criminals in villages and deserted areas, often alongside dangerous animals, and supporting characters who help the main protagonists.

He is the vice president of the Bangladesh Awami League-backed cultural organisation, Bongabondhu Sangskritik Jote.

He worked with Arifin Shuvo and Mahiya Mahi in the 2014 film Agnee. In 2015, he acted in the Delwar Jahan Jhantu film Epar Opar with stars Bappy Chowdhury and Achol and in 2016 he acted in Iftakar Chowdhury's film One Way, starring Bappy Chowdhury, and Bobby.

== Films ==
- Bir Purush (1987)
- Khotipuron (1989)
- Denmohor (1995)
- Bijli Toofan (2002)
- Ali Baba (2002) - (special appearance)
- Ek Lootera (2006)
- Prem Korechi Besh Korechi (2004)
- Kalo Haat (2004)
- City Terror (2005)
- Char Sotiner Ghor (2005)
- Bishakto Chobol (2005)
- Nach Ruposhi (2005)
- "Saagorer Gorjon" (2005) - Badshah
- Kabin Nama (2007)
- Machine Man (2007)
- Pita Matar Amanat (2008)
- Shaheb Name Golam (2009)
- O Saathi Re (2009)
- Biye Bari (2009)
- Chirodin Ami Tomar (2009)
- Ke Ami (2009)
- Banglar King Kong (2010)
- Amar Buker Moddhi Khane (2010) - Manager
- Sathi Hara Nagin (2011)
- Love in Jungle (2012)
- Pagol Tor Jonno Re (2013)
- Prem Prem Paglami (2013)
- Time Machine (2014)
- Agnee (2014)
- Big Brother (2015)
- One Way (2016)
- Premer Keno Fashi (2018)
- Protisodher Agun (2019)
- Akash Mahal (2019)
- Souvaggo (2021)

Year	Film	Role	Notes	Ref.
1986	Loraku	Danny Sidak	Debut film	
1995	Boner Raja Tarzan	Tarzan		
2013	Dhaka to Bombay	Danny		
2014	Agnee	Marshal		
2016	Bullet Babu	Badshah		
