= Ki Darun Dekhte =

Bangladeshi film

- Movie poster
- Directed by: Wazed Ali Sumon
- Written by: Abdullah Johir Babu
- Produced by: Shish Monwar
- Starring: Bappy Chowdhury; Mahiya Mahi; Shahriaz; Omar Sani; Misha Sawdagor
- Edited by: Tawhid Hossain Chowdhury
- Music by: Ahmed Humayun
- Production company: SMS Films
- Distributed by: Jaaz Multimedia
- Release date: 31 January 2014
- Country: Bangladesh
- Language: Bengali

Ki Darun Dekhte (Bengali: কি দারুন দেখতে) is a 2014 Bangladeshi Bengali-language film directed by Wazed Ali Sumon. The film stars Bappy Chowdhury, Mahiya Mahi, Shahriaz, Omar Sani, and Misha Sawdagor.

== Plot ==
Mahi used to disguise herself as a black woman to save herself from roadside romeos and to find her true love. Meanwhile, a gentle boy Apon and a goon-typed boy Songram fall in love with her. Will Mahi be able to find her true love ?

== Cast ==
- Bappy Chowdhury as Apon
- Mahiya Mahi as Mahi
- Shahriaz as Songram
- Omar Sani as Mahi's brother
- Misha Sawdagor as Babor Ali, Songram's brother
- Sohel Khan
- Gulshan Ara Ahmed
- Tanha Moumasi
- Ahmed Sharif
- Ishara Hossain

== Release ==
The release of Ki Darun Dekhte was originally scheduled to take place in 70 theaters on 29 November 2013. It had to be postponed because of political violence connected with protests, strikes, and blockades called by the 18-party opposition alliance in the months leading up to the 5 January 2014 general election.
