= Bhalobasar Rong =

- Movie poster
- Directed by: Shahin Sumon
- Written by: Abdullah Johir Babu
- Produced by: Abdul Aziz
- Starring: Mahiya Mahi; Bappy Chowdhury; Razzak; Ali Raj; Amit Hasan
- Cinematography: Kamrul Ahmed Ponir
- Edited by: Tawhid Hossain Chowdhury
- Music by: Shawkat Ali Imon; Imon Saha
- Production company: Jaaz Multimedia
- Distributed by: Jaaz Multimedia
- Release date: 5 October 2012
- Country: Bangladesh
- Language: Bengali

Bhalobasar Rong (Bengali: ভালোবাসার রং) is a Bangladeshi Bengali-language film. Directed by Shahin Sumon, it stars Bappy Chowdhury, Mahiya Mahi, Amit Hasan, Abdur Razzak and many more. It is a remake of 2010 Telugu film Baava.

== Cast ==
- Mahiya Mahi as Mahi/Faria
- Bappy Chowdhury as Bappy
- Abdur Razzak as Shamsuddin Chowdhury (Mahi/Faria's grandfather)
- Amit Hasan as villain
- Ali Raj as Bappi's father
- Kabila
- Mizu Ahmed
- Gulshan Ara Ahmed

== Music ==
Music of the movie was produced by Jaaz Multimedia.

== Release and screenings ==
The film Bhalobasar Rong was released nationwide on October 5, 2012, with screenings held in over 50 cinema halls across Dhaka and other locations in Bangladesh.

Bhalobasar Rong

Soundtrack album by Nancy, Shawkat Ali Imon, Kishor, Kona, Mila
- Released: 2012 (Bangladesh)
- Recorded: 2010
- Genre: Film sound track
- Label: Jaaz Multimedia
- Producer: Jaaz Multimedia
