= Wajed Ali Sumon =

Bangladeshi film director

Wazed Ali Sumon
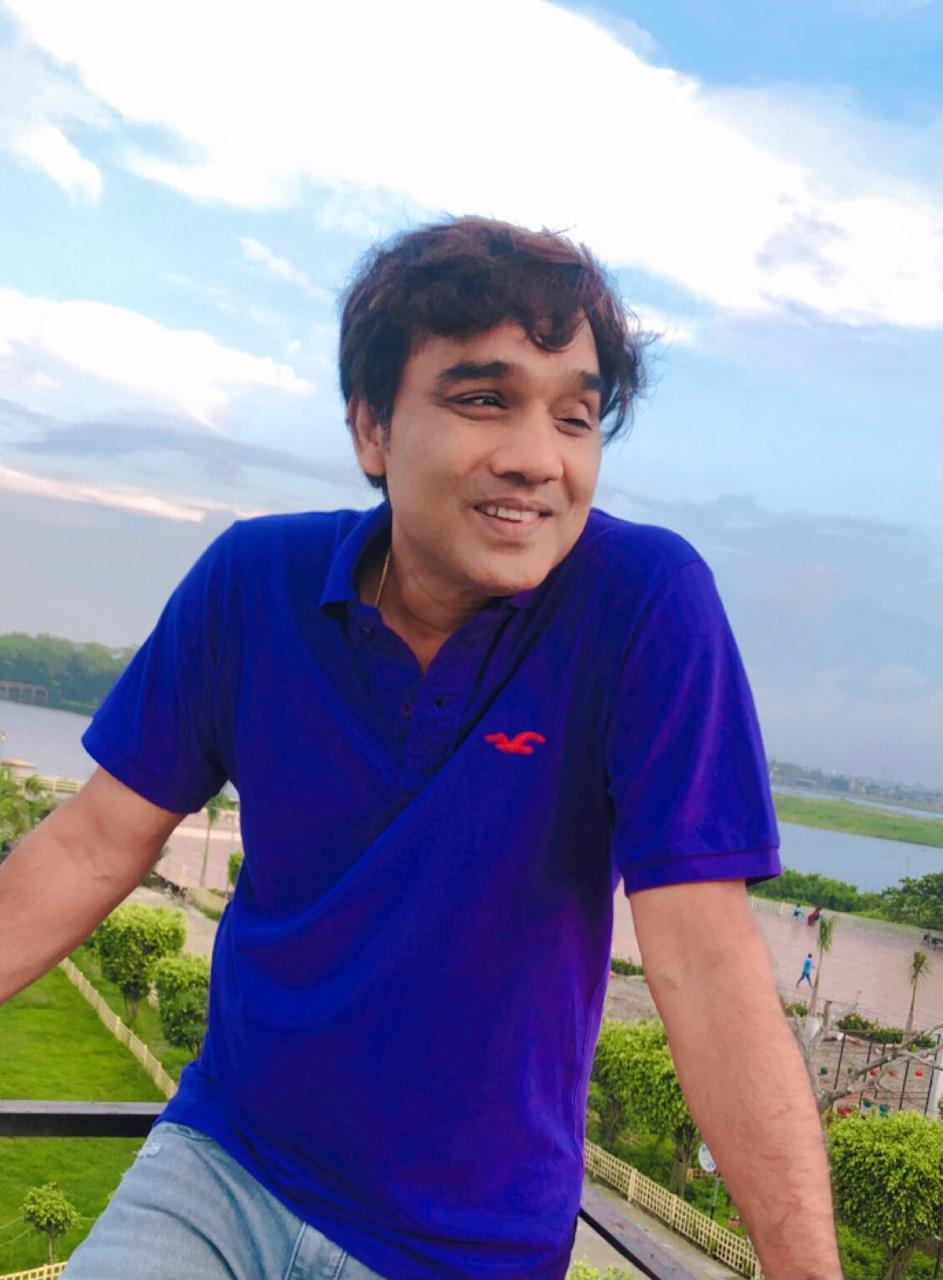
- Born: Rajshahi, Bangladesh
- Occupation: Film director
- Years active: 2010–present
- Known for: Rokto; Angaar; Captain Khan

Wazed Ali Sumon (Bengali: ওয়াজেদ আলী সুমন) is a Bangladeshi film director. He was born in Rajshahi district in Bangladesh. At the beginning of his career, he collaborated with Shahin. Their directorial duo was known as Shahin-Sumon. But from 2014, both started working separately. Sumon is making feature films continuously in Dhallywood.

== Career ==
Wazed Ali Sumon started his career as an assistant director in Bangladesh Film Development Corporation. At the beginning of his career, he started making films as a co-director. After that, he started making films jointly with film director Ruhul Kuddus Khan Shaheen. Their directorial duo was known as Shaheen Sumon. After long time they separated and began making films individually.

== Filmography ==
| Year | Films | Role | Artists | Notes | Ref |
|---|---|---|---|---|---|
| 2014 | Hitman | Director | Shakib Khan, Apu Biswas | | |
| 2014 | Ki Darun Dekhte | Director | Bappy Chowdhury, Mahiya Mahi | | |
| 2015 | Ajob Prem | Director | Bappy Chowdhury, Achol | | |
| 2015 | Pagla Deewana | Director | Shahriaz, Pori Moni | | |
| 2016 | Sweetheart | Director | Bappy Chowdhury, Bidya Sinha Mim | | |
| 2016 | Angaar | Director | Falguni Rahman Jolly, Om | Indo-Bangladesh joint production | |
| 2016 | Rokto | Director | Ziaul Roshan, Pori Moni | Indo-Bangladesh joint production | |
| 2018 | Mone Rekho | Director | Mahiya Mahi, Bonny Sengupta | | |
| 2018 | Captain Khan | Director | Shakib Khan, Bubly | | |
| 2025 | Antaratma | Director | Shakib Khan, Darshana Banik | | |
