= Shatru (2023 film) =

Shotru
- Official Poster
- Directed by: Sumon Dhar
- Written by: Delower Hossein Dil
- Produced by: Sunil Ghosh Shuvo
- Starring: Bappy Chowdhury; Zahara Mitu; Misha Sawdagor; Amir Siraji
- Music by: Emon Saha
- Production company: Ahriddha Films
- Distributed by: Tiger Media
- Release date: 22 April 2023
- Country: Bangladesh
- Language: Bengali

Shotru (Bengali: শত্রু, English: Enemy) is a 2023 Bangladeshi cop action thriller film directed by Sumon Dhar and written by Delower Hossein Dil. The film stars Bappy Chowdhury, Zahara Mitu and Misha Sawdagor. Sunil Ghosh Shuvo produced the film under the banner of Ahriddha Films. The film was released in Eid-ul-Fitr 2023.

== Cast ==
- Bappy Chowdhury as Durjoy, Sub-inspector of Bangladesh Police
- Zahara Mitu as Priyonti, Durjoy's love interest
- Misha Sawdagor as Akbar Shet
- Amir Siraji
- Jadu Azad
- Dr. Sohel Babu
- Amin Sorkar
- Lutfur Rahman Khan Shimanto
- Manos Bandopadhyay as Mahtab, officer in charge of Bangladesh Police
- Bobi
- Don as Amjad
- Maruf Akib as SP Sajjad
- Fowzia Zinon
- Eva Moni
- Energy Badol
- Sonia Akter Lazuk

== Production ==
=== Filming ===
The filming started in 2021 and ended in February 2023. Ahriddha Films produced the film.

== Music ==
Shatru Track List
No	Name	Singer(s)	Lyrics	Music	Duration
1	Priya Re Priya	Shawon Gaanwala, Atiya Anisha	Zahara Mitu, Hridoy	Shamim Mahmud	4:10
2	Pakhi Pakhi	Asif Akbar, Ankita	Zahara Mitu	Emon Saha	3:53
3	Police	Nakash	Riddhi	Savvy	3:33

== Release ==
The film was released in Eid-al-Fitr day on 22 April 2023 in 33 cinema halls.
