= Big Brother (2015 film) =

Bangladeshi romantic action film

- বিগ ব্রাদার
- Directed by: Shafi Uddin Shafi
- Written by: Saikat Nasir
- Screenplay by: Shafi Uddin Shafi
- Produced by: Shamsul Alam
- Starring: Mahiya Mahi; Shipan Mitra; Ahmed Sharif; Danny Sidak
- Cinematography: Topon Ahmed
- Edited by: Touhid Hossain Chowdhury
- Music by: Shawkat Ali Emon and Adit
- Distributed by: Fatman Films
- Release date: 6 February 2015
- Country: Bangladesh
- Language: Bangla

Big Brother (Bengali: বিগ ব্রাদার) is a 2015 Bangladeshi action romance film directed by Shafi Uddin Shafi and produced by Shamsul Alam It stars Mahiya Mahi in the lead role, Shipan Mitra, Ahmed Sharif, Danny Sidak and many more. It was released on 6 February 2015 throughout Bangladesh.

== Plot ==
Mahi, who is a rough woman gangster, used to expose herself as a "Man", is called "Big Brother" by the gang members. Everything gets changed when a happy-go-lucky guy named Rana comes to her life. Will Mahi find her pure love from Rana or is it a deep trick ?

== Cast ==
- Mahiya Mahi as Big Brother
- Shipan Mita as Rana
- Ahmed Sharif as Mr. Gulzar
- Danny Sidak as DJ Eli
- Prabir Mitra
- Rebeka Rouf
- Bipasha Kabir
- Ratan Khan

== Production ==
Big Brother is produced by Shamsul Alam and distributed by Fatman Films. The production of the film was announced on 21 April 2014 and filming started on May. After shooting and dubbing the film was submitted to Censor Board on 6 January 2015. It was released on 6 February 2015 in 78 screens in Bangladesh.

== Music ==
The film includes a total of five songs written by Kabir Bokul and Gazi Mazharul Anwar and features Dinat Jahan, Kona, Sharmin Roma, Dola and others as playback singers. The songs are composed by Shouquat Ali Imon and Adit.
