= Koto Shopno Koto Asha =

2017 film directed by Wakil Ahmed

- Movie poster
- Directed by: Wakil Ahmed
- Written by: Wahed Rahman
- Produced by: Wahed Rahman
- Starring: Pori Moni; Bappy Chowdhury
- Release date: 13 January 2017
- Language: Bengali

Koto Shopno Koto Asha is a 2017 Bengali romance-action film written and directed by Wakil Ahmed and starring Pori Moni and Bappy Chowdhury. It began filming on 3 January 2016, and was released on 13 January 2017.

== Cast ==
- Bappy Chowdhury
- Pori Moni
- Subrata
- Rehana Jolly
- Shatabdi Wadud
- DJ Shohel
- Kamal Patekar
- Harun Kisinger

== Soundtrack ==
- Imran
- Kona,
- Monir Khan,
- Nancy,
- Kheya, Razib
