= Pita Matar Amanat =

Bangladeshi film

- Directed by: F I Manik
- Story by: Mohammad Rafiquzzaman
- Produced by: Manna
- Starring: Manna; Purnima; Apu Biswas; Razzak; Kabari
- Music by: Emon Saha
- Release date: 9 December 2008
- Country: Bangladesh
- Language: Bengali

Pita Matar Amanat is a 2008 Bangladeshi film directed by F I Manik and produced by Manna. It stars Manna, Purnima and Apu Biswas in the lead roles. It was the eighth film produced by Manna.

== Cast ==
- Manna
- Purnima
- Apu Biswas
- Razzak
- Kabari
- Sadek Bachchu
- Danny Sidak
- Shiba Shanu
- Jamilur Rahman Shakha
- Jackie Alamgir

== Music ==
The film's songs have been composed by Emon Saha and penned by Mohammad Rafiquzzaman.

- "Bondhu Rongila" - Kumar Bishwajit, Dolly Sayontoni
