= Sultana Bibiana =

Bangladeshi romantic film

Sultana Bibiana সুলতানা বিবিয়ানা
- Film poster
- Directed by: Himel Ashraf
- Written by: Faruk Hossain
- Produced by: Arshad Adnan
- Starring: Bappy Chowdhury, Achol
- Music by: Emon Saha
- Production company: Versatile Media
- Distributed by: Versatile Media
- Release date: 31 March 2017
- Country: Bangladesh
- Language: Bengali

Sultana Bibiana (Bengali: সুলতানা বিবিয়ানা) is a 2017 Bangladeshi romantic film directed by Himel Ashraf. The film was not a commercial success. The performance of leading actor Bappy Chowdhury was, however, well received and earned him the name "The Sultan of Dhallywood" in the media. He ranks Sultan amongst the most memorable roles of his career.

== Cast ==
- Bappy Chowdhury as Sultan
- Achol as Shonali
- Shahiduzzaman Selim
- Mamunur Rashid
- Amit Hasan

== Reception ==
Amira Amin of The Daily Star reviewed the film positively.
