= Rina Brown =

Bangladeshi film

- Movie poster
- Directed by: Shameem Akhtar
- Starring: Barun Chanda; Saberi Alam; Shampa Reza; Jannatul Ferdoush Peya
- Music by: Aryan Ashik
- Release date: 13 January 2017 (Bangladesh)
- Country: Bangladesh
- Language: Bengali

Rina Brown is a 2017 Bangladeshi film starring Shampa Reza, Saberi Alam and Indian actor Barun Chanda. It was displayed at "Bangladesh National Film Festival - 2017". It is the 2nd film of director Shameem Akhtar, 13 years after her first film. The film deals with 1971's Indo-Pakistan war.

== Cast ==
- Barun Chanda
- Saberi Alam
- Shampa Reza
- Jannatul Ferdoush Peya
