= Ispahani Arif Jahan =

Bangladeshi actress

Ispahani and Arif Jahan
- Occupations: Directors, writers, producers
- Years active: 1995–present

Ispahani and Arif Jahan (Bengali: ইস্পাহানী আরিফ জাহান) the duo Dhallywood film directors are known for thriller and action genres. They also co-own the film production company's Diganta Chalachitra and Nakkhatra Chalachitra. They have also directed movies for other production company's in Dhallywood.

== Career ==
M. N. Ispahani and Arif Al Ashraf are cousins originally from Brahman Baria. They both started their careers with the help of Delwar Jahan Jhantu, a renowned film director and producer who is also their uncle.

Their uncle Delwar Jahan Jhantu advised them to first assist in film direction and hired them as his film assistant directors. Shahidul Haque Shikder helped them in directing their first film Bidrohi Bodhu. After that their film journey began as directors, then they started producing movies. The first Bengali film they produced was ‘Gulam’ with Shakib Khan, Shabnoor anddipjol in 2001. Since then, they have directed 17 movies and produced 14 movies and has distributed the movies Purno Dairgha Prem Kahini 1, Purno Dairgha Prem Kahini 2, Warning and Faad The Trap. The duo are known for taking inspiration from Bollywood films and adding glamour.

== Filmography ==
Year	Title	Artist	Notes
1995	Bidrohi Bodhu	Shabana, Alamgir, Bapparaj, Moushumi	Directional Debut
1996	Lat Shaheber Meye	Alamgir, Omar Sani, Moushumi	Director
1997	Shukher Shorgo	Shabana, Alamgir, Omar Sani, Moushumi	Director
1998	Amar Bou	Shakil Khan, Popy	Director
1998	Tumi Shundor	Omar Sani, Moushumi	Director
1999	Shotru Dhongsho	Shakil Khan, Ilias Kanchan, Nuton, Bhagyashree	Indo Bangla Joint venture with Shree Venkatesh Films
1999	Mostafa Bhai	Manna, Moushumi	Director
2000	Golam	Shakib Khan, Shabnur, Dipjol	Director & Producer
2001	Shikari	Shakib Khan, Purnima, Rubel, Dipjol	Director & Producer
2002	Nayok	Manna, Moushumi	Director & Producer
2003	Villain	Manna, Purnima	Director & Producer
2004	Amader Sontan	Razzak, Kabori, Manna, Neha	Director & Producer
2005	Sontrashi Munna	Manna, Moushumi	Director & Producer
2007	Aslam Bhai	Manna, Jona	Director
2007	Jomoj	Shakib Khan, Popy, Nodi	Producer
2007	Machine Man	Manna, Apu Biswas, Moushumi	Producer
2008	Ek Buk Bhalobasha	Emon, Apu Biswas	Director & Producer
2009	O Sathi Re	Shakib Khan, Apu Biswas	Producer
2013	Dhakar King	Shakib Khan, Apu Biswas	Producer
2013	Prem Prem Paglami	Bappy Chowdhury, Achol	Producer
2015	Gunda - The Terrorist	Bappy Chowdhury, Achol, Amrita Khan, Tanvir	Director
2018	Nayok	Bappy Chowdhury, Adhora Khan	Director
2022	Hridita	ABM Sumon, Puja Cherry Roy	Director
