= Sweetheart (2016 film) =

Bangladeshi romantic drama film

- Film poster
- Directed by: Wazed Ali Sumon
- Written by: S Reza
- Screenplay by: Wazed Ali Sumon
- Produced by: Didar Khan; A.S Raj
- Starring: Bappy Chowdhury; Bidya Sinha Mim; Riaz Uddin Ahamed Siddique
- Edited by: Touhid Hossain
- Music by: Shafiq Tuhin
- Production company: Digital Movies
- Distributed by: Tiger Media Limited
- Release date: 12 February 2016 (Bangladesh)
- Running time: 140 minutes
- Country: Bangladesh
- Language: Bengali

Sweetheart is a 2016 Bangladeshi romantic drama film written by S. Reza and directed by Wazed Ali Sumon. The film stars Bappy Chowdhury, Bidya Sinha Mim, Riaz Uddin Ahamed Siddique with Shampa Reza and Parveen Sultana Diti in supporting roles.

Riaz plays Richard, the only heir of an established business dynasty who is in love with Prilina, a childhood friend, portrayed by Mim. Before going to London for higher education, Richard gets engaged to Prilina. While Richard is away, Prilina gets close to Jishan, played by Bappy. The two become closer as they spend time together, Prilina realizes her feelings for Jishan. Meanwhile, Richard returns from abroad. Divided by religion, and nonacceptance from society, the lives of three individuals end in tragedy.

Sweetheart first look was officially launched on 17 May 2015 by Tiger Media Limited and second teaser was revealed a month later. The Official Trailer of the film was revealed on 30 January 2016. The film is produced by A.S Raj under the banner of Digital Movies. The film soundtrack album was launched on 8 February 2016 at Star Cineplex and received tremendous response from audiences since then. The film is released in 80 screens on 12 February 2016.

== Plot ==
Brilina (Mim) and Richard (Riaz) belong to traditional Christian family. Growing up together, Brilina and Richard get accustomed to each other's accompany. During teenage years, Richard goes to London for higher studies. While Richard is away, Brilina gets to know Zishan (Bappy), who belongs to a Muslim family. As time passes, their friendship turns to love. However, in the meantime, Richard returns to Brilina and proposes to her, and Bilina accepts due to immense pressure from community and family. Unknown about the feelings Brilina has for Zishan, Richard marries her and soon after, however, their marriage remains complicated.

Zishan, heartbroken by the treachery of Brilina, thinks that Bilina left him because of Richard's wealth, and vows to build an empire of wealth. As the film turns complex, the story of the film revolves around the love triangle between three individuals, whose love turns to utmost hate.

== Cast ==
- Bappy Chowdhury as Zishan, Bilina's love interest
- Bidya Sinha Mim as Brilina Rosario
- Parveen Sultana Diti, Jishan's mother
- Khosheduzamman Utpal, Richard's father, a multi-millionaire businessman
- Shampa Reza as Mariah Rosario, Bilina's mother
- Prabir Mitra, a manager working at Jishan's business
- Neel
- Rex Jafor as Anamul
- Riaz Uddin Ahamed Siddique as Richard, a British millionaire and Bilina's childhood friend (Special Appearance)

== Production ==
=== Casting ===
The film was first announced in 2013, with Mim and Bappy selected for the lead roles. Numerous media outlets reported that Mamnun Hasan Emon was approached to play a lead role in the film. However, Riaz Uddin Ahamed Siddiqui was later approached to play the role of Richard.

=== Filming ===
Principal photography started in November 2014 with Mim and Bappy. The first phase of the shooting was done in Dhaka, while about 20 percent of the film and songs were shot in Malaysia. The film was extensively shot for 45 days in Dhaka while 12 days in Malaysia.

== Release ==
The film was intended to be released during July 2015, however, the date was postponed due to post-production. The film premiered at the Star Cineplex at Bashundhara City on 10 February 2016. The makers of the film went to release the film on 12 February 2016, on the occasion of Valentine's Day. The film was praised by critics and many production companies around the country, including Jaaz Multimedia. The film was released on 12 February on 81 screens in Bangladesh.

== Music ==
Sweetheart

Soundtrack album by Various artists
- Released: 1 August 2015 (Digital Release); 8 February 2016 (Official Release)
- Genre: Feature film soundtrack
- Length: 25:00
- Language: Bengali
- Label: Tiger Media Limited

Singles from Sweetheart (Original Motion Picture Soundtrack)
- 1. "Ek Mutho Prem" Released: 23 March 2015; 2. "Kenore Tor Majhe" Released: 11 June 2015

Sweetheart's film score is composed by Shafiq Tuhin with songs composed by Habib Wahid, Hridoy Khan, and Ahmed Humayun. and lyrics written by Sudip Kumar Dip and Kabir Bakul. The first track titled "Ek Mutho Prem" was released on 23 March 2015 as the first single prior to the soundtrack album's release. The second single to be released was "Kenore Tor Majhe". The album features five tracks, and was released August 2015. Tiger Media Limited acquired the music rights of the film.

=== Track listing ===
No.	Title	Lyrics	Music	Singer(s)	Length
1.	"Ek Jholoke"	Kabir Bakul	Hridoy Khan	Hridoy Khan	5:00
2.	"Ek Mutho Prem"	Kabir Bakul	Hridoy Khan	Hridoy Khan, Sabrina Porshi	5:07
3.	"Bhalobasha Holo Na"	Kabir Bakul	Habib Wahid	Habib Wahid, Nancy	4:56
4.	"Kenore Tor Majhe"	Sudip Kumar Dip	Ahmmed Humayun	Ahmmed Humayun, Roma	4:42
5.	"Bidhata (Ami Akasher Kache Jante Chai)"	Kabir Bakul	Shafiq Tuhin	James	5:15
Total length:					25:00
