= Inchi Inchi Prem =

Bangladeshi film

- Movie poster
- Directed by: Raju Chowdhury
- Written by: Abdullah Zahir Babu
- Starring: Bobby; Bappy Chowdhury; Srabon; Sathiya Jahid; Sohel Khan; Rebeka Rouf; Gangua; Rina Khan
- Edited by: Tawhid Hossain Chowdhury
- Distributed by: Jaaz Multimedia
- Release date: 15 November 2013
- Country: Bangladesh
- Language: Bengali

Inchi Inchi Prem (Bengali: ইঞ্চি ইঞ্চি প্রেম, released 2013) is a Bangladeshi film directed by Raju Chowdhury and starring Bappy Chowdhury and Bobby.

== Cast ==
- Bappy Chowdhury as Shuvo
- Bobby as Megha
- Srabon as Akash
- Sathiya Jahid as Nila
- Sohel Khan as Sadek Chowdhury
- Gangua as Anayet
- Rebeka Rouf as Shuvo's mother
- Rina Khan
- DJ Shohel
- Chikon Ali as Bacchu
- Afzal Sharif as Shior Ali

== Response ==
Film critic Sadia Khalid, writing for The Daily Star, praised Bobby's wardrobe, but gave the movie only one star out of a possible five, saying "This film is bound to let her audiences down". The Dhaka Tribune described it as a commercial failure.
