= Mukhosh (2022 film) =

2022 Bangladeshi mystery thriller film

- Directed by: Efthakhar Suvo
- Based on: Page Number 44 by Efthakhar Suvo
- Produced by: Siyam Ahmed
- Starring: Ziaul Roshan; Mosharraf Karim; Pori Moni; Iresh Zaker; Pran Roy; Faruque Ahmed; Rashed Mamun Apu; Alongkar Chowdhury
- Cinematography: Forhad Hossain; Nahian Belal
- Edited by: Mahi Islam Mitul
- Production companies: Government of Bangladesh; Bachelor Dot Com Production
- Distributed by: Cop Creation; Tiger Media
- Release date: 4 March 2022
- Country: Bangladesh
- Language: Bengali

Mukhosh is a 2022 Bangladeshi mystery thriller film directed by Efthakhar Suvo. With the grant from Government of Bangladesh, Efthakhar Suvo produced the film under the banner of Bachelor Dot Com Production, and Cop Creation served as the distributor. It is based on his unpublished novel Page Number 44. The film stars Mosharraf Karim, Pori Moni, Ziaul Roshan, Iresh Zaker, Pran Roy, Faruque Ahmed, Rashed Mamun Apu, Azad Abul Kalam, Tarek Sapan, Elina Shammi and Alongkar Chowdhury. It was released on 4 March 2022.

== Cast ==
- Mosharraf Karim as Ibrahim Khaledi
- Pori Moni
- Ziaul Roshan as Sayan
- Iresh Zaker
- Azad Abul Kalam
- Faruque Ahmed
- Pran Roy
- Rashed Mamun Apu
- Tarik Swapan
- Elina Shammi
- Alongkar Chowdhury

== Production ==
Mosharraf Karim joined the cast in November 2020. Principal photography started in January 2021. Mukhosh has been extensively shot in Ekushey Book Fair, Sylhet, Tangail, BFDC and Padma Char areas.

== Release ==
The trailer of the film dropped on YouTube on 18 February 2022. Mukhosh was released on 4 March 2022 in Bangladesh. Previously, it was scheduled to release on 21 January 2022, but due to sudden surge of the omicron variant in Bangladesh, it was delayed to the new date.
