= Shameem Akhtar =

Bangladeshi film director

Shameem Akhtar is a Bangladeshi director and screenwriter, known for her trilogy of films about women's experiences of the Bangladesh Liberation War.

== Career ==
Akhtar made her debut with a 10 minute long non-fiction film The Conversation, assisted by Tareque Masud. In 1993, she made another non-fiction film The Eclipse. Her film Rina Brown was released in 13 January, 13 years after her first film. The film deals with 1971's Indo-Pakistan war. She also made Kalpurush film in 2010.

== Filmography ==
- 1991 The Conversation
- 1993 Grohonkal (The Eclipse)
- 1999 Itihaash Konna (Daughters of History)
- 2002 Shilalipi (The Inscription)
- 2017 Rina Brown

== Awards ==
- 2020 Shilpakala Padak
