= Prem Prem Paglami =

2013 film

- Movie poster
- Directed by: Shafi Uddin Shafi
- Written by: Abdullah Jahir Babu; Chotku Ahmed
- Produced by: Ispahini Arrif Jahan
- Starring: Bappy Chowdhury; Achol; Amit Hasan; Shiba Shanu; Danny Sidak
- Cinematography: Ahmmed
- Edited by: Tawhid Hossain Chowdhury
- Production company: Diganta Cholocchitra
- Distributed by: Jaaz Multimedia
- Release date: 21 June 2013
- Running time: 152 minutes
- Country: Bangladesh
- Language: Bengali

Prem Prem Paglami (Bengali: প্রেম প্রেম পাগলামি) is a Bangladeshi romantic and action drama film directed by Shafi Uddin Shafi and produced by Diganta Kathchitra. The film's cast consisted of Bappy Chowdhury, Achol, Amit Hasan and Shiva Shanu. Prem Prem Paglami was released on 60 screens and according to the Dhaka Tribune, the film received positive responses from the audience and "did good business". The movie is a remake of 2008 Telugu film Krishna.

== Cast ==
- Bappy Chowdhury as Romeo
- Achol as Simi
- Amit Hasan as Virus
- Danny Sidak
- Kazi Hayat
- Shiba Shanu as PC
- Afzal Sharif as Mama (Uncle)
- Nasrin
- Bipasha Kabir as Item girl
- Mohasin Hossain Dipu Howlader

== Singer ==
- S. I. Tutul
- Dinat Jahan Munni
- Moon
- Soroliphi
