= Tobuo Bhalobashi =

- Directed by: Montazur Rahman Akbar
- Written by: Abdullah Johir Babu
- Produced by: Shish Monwar
- Starring: Mahiya Mahi; Bappy Chowdhury; Sohel Rana; Amit Hasan; Diti
- Edited by: Tawhid Hossain Chowdhury
- Music by: Shafiq Tuhin; Shawkat Ali Emon
- Production company: Jaaz Multimedia
- Distributed by: Jaaz Multimedia
- Release date: 27 September 2013
- Country: Bangladesh
- Language: Bangla

Tobuo Bhalobashi (Bengali: তবুও ভালোবাসি) is a Bangladeshi Bengali-language film. It is directed by Montazur Rahman Akbar. It stars Mahiya Mahi, Bappy Chowdhury, Amit Hasan (villain), Sohel Rana, Diti, Asif Iqbal, and many more.

== Plot ==
Completing graduation, before taking charge of the family business, Sangram, an honest and active protester against injustice goes to Gazipur at his friend's wedding party. At that party, he is introduced to a naughty girl Sunayana. He is in love with Sunayana but he doesn't propose to her for fear of her father. One day when Sunayana's father becomes ill, Sangram has to go bring some medicine while hartal is running that was called by a terrorist Lal. Sangram looks over the hartal, and is involved in conflict with terrorist Lal. Lal wants pay back.

== Cast ==
- Mahiya Mahi as Sunoyna
- Bappy Chowdhury as Songram
- Amit Hasan as Lal
- Sohel Rana as Rashid Chowdhury
- Diti as Songram's mother
- Mizu Ahmed as Gazi Marhaba
- Rehana Jolly as Momota
- Gulshan Ara Ahmed as Ishana's mother
- Asif Iqbal
- Boby as Hayder
- Subrata as Farid
- Shah Alam Kiron as Kironpuri

== Soundtrack ==
1. "Elomelo Shomoy" – Kona
2. "Ek Sonali Kabin" – Kona And Kishor
3. "Hawa A Hawa" – Mila And Saymon
4. "Biyar O Dhol" – Kona, Razib, Kumar Bishwajit, Samina Chowdhury
5. "Tumi Acho Nojore Nojore" – Nancy And Shafiq Tuhin
6. "Elomelo Shomoy" (reprise) – Kona

== Critical response ==
Film critic Nabeel Onusurjo reviewed the film for Bdnews24.com.
