= Apon Manush =

Bangladeshi film

- Movie poster
- Directed by: Shah Alam Mondol
- Starring: Bappi Chowdhury; Pori Moni; Jannatul Ferdoush Peya; Amiya Ami
- Cinematography: S M Azahar
- Music by: Emon Saha
- Distributed by: Emon Khan Films
- Release date: 28 April 2017
- Country: Bangladesh
- Language: Bengali

Apon Manush is a 2017 Bangladeshi film directed by Shah Alam Mondol, starring Bappy Chowdhury, Amiya Ami (in her Dhallywood film debut) and Pori Moni. The musical score was composed by Ahmed Imtiaz Bulbul.

== Cast ==
- Bappi Chowdhury
- Pori Moni
- Jannatul Ferdoush Peya
- Amiya Ami

== Production and release ==
Locations used for the shooting of the film included Cox's Bazar, Rangpur and Dhaka.

The film, starring Pori Moni, was released on April, 27, 2017.

== Music ==
- "Shurjo Ki Hoy Kiron Chhara" - Imran Mahmudul and Nazmun Munira Nancy
- "Tumi Amar Janamaz" - Monir Khan
- "Prem Therapy" - Roma
- "Dekhe Oi Figure" - Rupom and Roma
- "Attar Attio" - Konok Chapa and Konal
