= Shoshurbari Zindabad 2 =

- Directed by: Debashish Biswas
- Screenplay by: Debasish Biswas
- Story by: Abdullah Zahir Babu
- Produced by: Bengal Multimedia Limited
- Starring: Bappy Chowdhury; Apu Biswas
- Music by: Emon Saha; Shree Pritam; Akassh
- Production company: Bengal Multimedia Limited
- Distributed by: Bengal Multimedia Limited
- Release date: February 11, 2022
- Country: Bangladesh
- Language: Bengali

Shoshurbari Zindabad 2 is a Bangladeshi romantic-drama film. The film was directed by Debashish Biswas and produced by Bengal Multimedia Limited. It featured Bappy Chowdhury and Apu Biswas in the lead roles and Sadek Bachchu, Kabila, and Afzal Sharif played supporting roles in the film.

== Cast ==
- Bappy Chowdhury as Abir
- Apu Biswas as Ishana
- Sadek Bachchu
- Rebeka Rouf
- Afzal Sharif
- Kabila
- Harun Kisinger
- Chikon Ali
- Shahin Khan
- Mahamudul Islam Mithu

== Production ==
On May 13, 2018, the Muharat of the film was held at Priyanka Shooting Spot in Dhaka. Bappy Chowdhury and Apu Biswas signed a contract for the lead roles of the film on February 8, 2018.

== Music ==
The film's soundtrack was composed by Emon Saha, Shree Pritam, and Akassh.

== Release ==
The film was scheduled to release on March 20, 2020, but the release was postponed due to the COVID-19 pandemic. The film was released on February 11, 2022, in 25 cinemas.
