= Shona Bondhu =

2017 film

- Film poster
- Directed by: Jahangir Alam Sumon
- Written by: Mahbuba Shahrin
- Starring: D A Tayeb; Pori Moni; Sadika Parvin Popy
- Music by: Aryan Ashik
- Release date: 2 September 2017
- Country: Bangladesh
- Language: Bengali

Shona Bondhu is a 2017 Bangladeshi drama film directed by Jahangir Alam Sumon and the film stars D A Tayeb, Pori Moni and Sadika Parvin Popy and many more. It was one of two films shortlisted as the Bangladeshi entry for the Best Foreign Language Film at the 90th Academy Awards, but it lost out to Khacha.

== Cast ==
- D A Tayeb as Nayan, a baul singer
- Pori Moni as Kajol
- Sadika Parvin Popy as Rushni
- Anowara as Kajol's mother
