= Bhalobasha Aaj Kal =

Bangladeshi romantic comedy film

- Theatrical release poster
- Directed by: P. A. Kajol
- Produced by: Jaaz Multimedia
- Starring: Shakib Khan; Mahiya Mahi; Ali Raj; Kabila; Misha Sawdagor
- Edited by: M A Salam; Zamal
- Music by: Shafiq Tuhin; Fuad; Imon Shah; Ahmed Imtiaz Bulbul
- Production company: Jaaz Multimedia
- Release date: 9 August 2013
- Country: Bangladesh
- Language: Bengali

Bhalobasha Aaj Kal (Bengali: ভালোবাসা আজকাল) is a Dhallywood romantic comedy film directed by P. A. Kajol and produced by Jaaz Multimedia. The film features Shakib Khan and Mahiya Mahi in lead roles. It is the first collaboration between Khan and Jaaz Multimedia and the first between Khan and Mahiya Mahi. Filming began on 2 February 2013, and was wrapped up by June 2013. The film was released on Eid-ul-Fitr on 9 August 2013. Upon release, the film received positive reviews and declared as a superhit at the box office. Also, it was the highest-grossing film of Jaaz Multimedia production till Shikari was released.

== Cast ==
- Shakib Khan as Rana
- Mahiya Mahi as Dana
- Ali Raj as Haidar
- Kabila as Mama
- Misha Sawdagor as Police officer
- Rehana Jolly
- Gulshan Ara Ahmed
- Shiba Shanu
- Kala Aziz
- Jamil Hossain

== Music ==
Bhalobasha Aaj Kal

Soundtrack album by Shafik Tuhin, Fuad, Imon Shah And Ahmed Imtiaz Bulbul
- Recorded: 2013
- Genre: Film soundtrack
- Language: Bengali

The soundtrack of Bhalobasha Aaj Kal composed by Shafik Tuhin, Fuad, Imon Shah, Sayeem Hasan And Ahmed Imtiaz Bulbul. with lyrics penned by Kabir Bokul, Ahmed Imtiaj Bulbul, Shafik Tuhin and Abdul Aziz.

Tracklist
No.	Title	Singer(s)	Length
1.	"Bhalobasa Aaj Kal"	Kona, Rupom
2.	"Sopno Deki Ami Sopno"	Kona
3.	"Ei Prothom Akti Mukh"	Kisor, Nancy
4.	"Sunte Ki Pao Tumi"	Rupom
5.	"Mamu Vaigna Good Luck"	Kisor, Farzan

== Marketing ==
The first look of Bhalobasa Aaj Kal was revealed on 10 July 2013. A forty-two seconds promo teaser was released on 17 July 2013.
