= Bappy Chowdhury =

Bangladeshi actor (b. 1994)

- বাপ্পি চৌধুরী
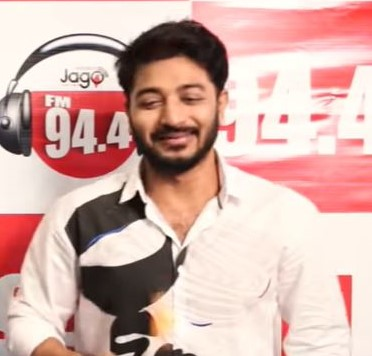
- Chowdhury at Jago FM station, 2019
- Born: Bappy Kumar Saha; 6 December 1994 (age 31); Narayanganj, Dacca District, Bangladesh
- Education: University of Liberal Arts Bangladesh
- Occupation: Actor
- Years active: 2012–present
- Works: Full list

Bappy Chowdhury (born Bappy Kumar Saha; 6 December 1994) is a Bangladeshi actor who works in Dhallywood films.

Chowdhury began his acting career with the box-office hit Bhalobasar Rong (2012). He went on to star in successful films including Prem Prem Paglami, Tobuo Bhalobashi (both 2013), Sweetheart (2016), Apon Manush (2017), Nayok (2018), Daag Hridoye and Paglami (both 2019). He also played Sultan in the 2017 film Sultana Bibiana, which initially underperformed but has gained public recognition over the years. In 2021, Chowdhury won a Dhallywood Film and Music award in the Best Actor category.

== Early life and education ==
Chowdhury was born on 6 December 1994, in Narayanganj, Dacca District, Bangladesh (now in Narayanganj District). His father, Noni Gopal Saha, is a businessman and social worker, and his mother, Swapan Saha (d. 2024), was a housewife. Since his childhood, Chowdhury aspired to be an actor, inspired by Salman Shah and Nayok Raz Razzak.

Born in a Hindu family, Chowdhury describes himself as a religious individual who believes in God. He studied journalism at the University of Liberal Arts Bangladesh, and joined NTV as an apprentice journalist in 2018.

== Career ==
Chowdhury made his acting debut in 2012 with Bhalobasar Rong, opposite Mahiya Mahi. The film was a major financial success. For his 2013 works—Onnorokom Bhalobasha, Prem Prem Paglaami and Tobou Bhalobashi—Chowdhury earned three Freelancer Rubel nominations in the Best Actor category. The 2013 commercial success Jotil Prem starred him opposite Achol. Two of his subsequent films, Lover Number One and Ajob Prem (both 2015), were remakes of Indian movies. In 2016, he starred with Bidya Sinha Saha Mim in two films: Sweetheart and Ami Tomar Hote Chai; the latter was a moderate success. The same year, he also featured in Apon Manush with Pori Moni and in One Way with Bobby.

In 2017, he reunited with Achol in Sultana Bibiana; although the film was unsuccessful, he ranks Sultan amongst the most memorable roles of his career. Chowdhury starred opposite Adhora Khan in Nayok (2018), which became a box office hit. The thriller Dongiri (2019) saw him switch from romantic to action roles; the film proved popular with the audience. His other two releases of 2019 were critical and financial successes: Daag Hridoye and Paglami. Chowdhury's role in the liberation drama Priyo Kamala (2020) was well received by critics. He did not have any other releases in 2020–21 due to the COVID-19 pandemic. He returned to the screen in 2022 with Shoshurbari Zindabad 2, opposite Apu Biswas.

Chowdhury then collaborated with director Kazi Hayat on Joy Bangla (2023; co-starring Zahara Mitu). It was a highly anticipated release, based on Muntassir Mamoon's novel of the same name. However, the film failed to attract an audience, and so did his other release of 2023, Shotru.

December 2024 saw the release of Chowdhury's delayed thriller film, Danger Zone, which was awaiting release for seven years. Directed by Belal Sani, it stars Chowdhury opposite Falguni Rahman Jolly.

=== Upcoming projects ===
In February 2022, New Age reported that Chowdhury is simultaneously working in eleven productions. He will be playing the leading role in Ashraf Shishir's under-production film, 570, based on the assassination of Sheikh Mujibur Rahman. His other upcoming films include Kustigir, which pairs him with Zahara Mitu.

== In the media ==
Chowdhury is frequently referred to in the media as "The Sultan of Dhallywood", a nickname he has earned from his character in Sultana Bibiana (2017). Shah Alam Shazu of The Daily Star describes Chowdhury as "one of the film industry's most sought-after names [who] created a craze around him[self] in a relatively short period of time." Most of Chowdhury's films have been commercially successful.

Following his debut in 2012, Chowdhury went on to act in 16 films in the first three years of his career, breaking the record of actor Salman Shah, who earlier had starred in 13 films in the same timespan. While he initially became known for playing romantic roles, he later expanded to negative characters with One Way (2016) and in the action genre with Dongiri (2019). Critics have nonetheless derided his lack of versatility; the actor has expressed his wish to play more experimental roles in the future.

Chowdhury has advocated the upliftment of Bangladeshi art and cinema on multiple occasions. When Dhallywood faced financial adversity during the COVID-19 pandemic, he was among the highly-paid actors who lowered their fees to keep the industry afloat. In 2021, he and Shakib Khan jointly won a Best Actor award at the Dhallywood Film and Music ceremony. In 2023, Chowdhury was awarded in the special category at the 20th Tele Cine Awards, held in Kolkata.

On behalf of BRAC, Chowdhury visited the Rohingya refugee camps in 2018. He later described the visit as "one of the most eye-opening experiences of [his] life".

== Filmography ==
Year	Film	Role	Director	Notes
2012	Bhalobasar Rong	Bappy	Shaheen Sumon	Debut film
2013	Onnorokom Bhalobasha	Shuvo	Shaheen Sumon	
2013	Jotil Prem	Jibon Chowdhury	Shaheen Sumon	
2013	Romeo	Romeo	Raju Chowdhury	
2013	Prem Prem Paglami	Romeo	Shafi Uddin Shafi	
2013	Tobuo Bhalobashi	Songram	Montazur Rahman Akbar	
2013	Ki Prem Dekhaila	Sami	Shah Mohammad Songram	
2013	Inchi Inchi Prem	Shuvo	Raju Chowdhury	
2014	Ki Darun Dekhte	Apon	Wajed Ali Sumon	
2014	Dobir Saheber Songsar	Kuddus	Jakir Hossain Raju	
2014	Honeymoon	Rusho	Shafi Uddin Shafi	
2014	I Don't Care	Surjo	Mohammad Hossain Jaimy	
2014	Love Station	Nibir	Shahadat Hossain Liton	
2014	Onek Sadher Moyna	Moti	Jakir Hossain Raju	
2015	Gunda: The Terrorist	Jibon	Ispahani Arif Jahan	
2015	Lover Number One	Badshah	Faruk Omar	
2015	Ajob Prem	Rafi	Wajed Ali Sumon	
2015	Epar Opar	Shimul	Delwar Jahan Jhantu	
2016	Sweetheart	Zishan	Wajed Ali Sumon	
2016	Onek Dame Kena		Jakir Hossain Raju	
2016	Baje Chele: The Loafer	Reshad Chowdhury	Monirul Islam Sohel & Rahim Babu	
2016	One Way	Emon	Iftakar Chowdhury	
2016	Ami Tomar Hote Chai	Abir	Anonno Mamun	
2017	Koto Swapno Koto Asha	Jibon	Wakil Ahmed	
2017	Missed Call	Roman	Shafi Uddin Shafi	
2017	Sultana Bibiana	Sultan	Himel Ashraf	
2017	Dulabhai Zindabad	Sagor	Montazur Rahman Akbar	
2017	Apon Manush	Robi	Shah Alam Mondal	
2018	Poloke Poloke Tomake Chai	Tamim	S.M. Shahnawaz Shanu	
2018	Nayok	Abhi	Ispahani Arif Jahan	
2018	Asmani	Azad / Asman	M. Shakhawat Hossain	
2019	Daag Hridoye	Shohag	Tarek Shikder	
2019	Paglami	Prem	Komol Sarkar	
2019	Dongiri		Shah Alam Mondal	
2020	Priyo Komola	Priyo	Shahriar Nazim Joy	
2022	Shoshurbari Zindabad 2	Abir	Debashish Biswas	
2023	Joy Bangla		Kazi Hayat	
2023	Shotru	Durjoy	Sumon Dhar	
2024	Danger Zone †	TBA	Belal Sani	
2025	Kustigir †	TBA	Shaheen Sumon	
TBA	570 †	TBA	Ashraf Shishir	

== Awards and nominations ==
Year	Awards	Category	Film	Result
2013	Freelancer Rubel	First Stage Nomination for Best Film Actor	Onnorokom Bhalobasha	Nominated
2013	Freelancer Rubel	Second Stage Nomination for Best Film Actor	Prem Prem Paglaami	Nominated
2013	Freelancer Rubel	Third Stage Nomination for Best Film Actor	Tobou Bhalobashi	Nominated
2021	Dhallywood Film and Music Awards	Best Actor		Won
2023	20th Tele Cine Awards Kolkata	Special		Won
