= Amit Hasan =

Bangladeshi actor

- অমিত হাসান
- Born: Khondakar Saifur Rahman; Adalatapara, Tangail, Bangladesh
- Occupation: Actor
- Years active: 1990–present

Amit Hasan is a Bangladeshi film actor. His actual name is Khandar Saifur Rahman. He was elected secretary general of the Bangladesh Film Actors' Association in 2015. In its review of 2011 cinema, The Daily Star included Amit Hasan among "Other stars that deserve mention".

== Career ==
Hasan made his debut in the movie Chetona, directed by Chatku Ahmed, in 1990. During that time he was performing in the name of Saifur. He was named after Amit Hasan by acting in movie Aamor Shongi, directed by late Alamgir Kumkum. He became a successful solo hero with the film Jyoti, directed by Monwar Khokon. He was debuted as a villain in digital movie Bhalobashar Rong, directed by Shahin-Sumon. He acted in role of Tufan in the movie. He has played different characters in many cinemas with many actresses such as Shabnur and Popy. Alongside Amit has also worked with other actors as Riaz and Shakib Khan.

Although he was mostly a side actor to lead protagonists at his early 4 years of his career in movies such as Hingsha , Malamal, Bhalobashar Ghor, Atto Bishash, Banglar Ma, Ashami Greftar , Stri Hotta & Ziddi, he established himself as a lead actor in movies such as Jyoti, Ashik, Sakkhi Proman, Shashon, Shesh Thikana, Onek Diner Asa, Tumi Shudu Tumi, Khuni Chairman, Khuni Billa, Paglir Prem, Attosat, Chakrani, Rongin Bini Sutar Mala, Baba Mastan, Sotter Bijoy, Bouer Somman, Bhulona Amay, Tomar Jonno Pagol, Ke Apon Ke Por , Takai Joto Gondogol , Sardar

His career took a downturn after 2004 and he has mostly been a supporting actor since then with his performance in notable movies such Tiger Number One , Doctar Bari, Jamai Shashur, Kothin Simar, Rongbaz Badhshah, Sontaner Moto Sontan , Bou Keno Bondok, Bhaier Shotru Bhai, Kathin Purush, Majhir Chele Barrister, & Tumi Swapno Tumi Sadhona

After 2011, he has successfully established himself as a leading villain with movies such as a Bhalobashar Rong, Onnorokom Bhalobasha , Agnee 2, Antaranga, Tobuo Bhalobashi Bossgiri, cementing his status as a successful artist in the Bangladesh film industry with back-to-back diverse roles to continue his active film career.

In January 2015 Hasan participated in a strike of Bangladeshi film artists against the screening of the Indian film Wanted in Bangladesh, calling for a boycott of Bangladeshi theatres showing the movie.

== Filmography ==
Year	Film	Role	Notes	Ref.
1990	Chetona		Debut film	
	Aamor Shongi			
	Jyoti			
1996	Premer Somadhi			
1999	Tomar Jonno Pagol	Doctor Hridoy		
2001	Rangbaz Badshah			
2003	Kothin Simar	Mithun		
2003	Jamai Shashur	Masud Khan		
2004	Bhaier Shotru Bhai			
2012	Bhalobashar Rong	Tufan		
2013	Onnorokom Bhalobasha			
2013	Tobou Bhalobashi	Lal		
2013	Full and Final	Bokhtiar		
2014	Hero: The Superstar	Anowar Chowdhury / Dollar		
2015	Bojhena Se Bojhena			
2015	Agnee 2	Mithun Sarkar	Indo-Bangladesh joint production	
2015	Padma Patar Jol			
2015	Antaranga			
2016	Angaar		Indo-Bangladesh joint production	
2016	Raja 420			
2016	Shikari		Indo-Bangladesh joint production	
2016	Bossgiri	DK the Dangerous Killer		
2016	Rokto		Indo-Bangladesh joint production	
2016	Dhumketu			
2017	Mayabini	Shuvasree Acharjee		
2017	Sultana Bibiana			
2017	Boss 2: Back to Rule	Prince Shahnawaz Hussain	Indo-Bangladesh joint production	
2017	Nabab	Kali		
2017	Rajneeti	Jabbar Miyan		
2018	Captain Khan			
2019	Boyfriend			
2019	Garments Sromik Zindabad			
2026	Bou Niye Juddho	Osman		
