= Shafi Uddin Shafi =

Bangladeshi film director

- Occupation: Film director

Shafi Uddin Shafi is a Bangladeshi film director. As of December 2019 he directed 24 films.

== Biography ==
Shafi's first direction Gaddari. It was released in 2003. At the beginning of his career he directed films along with Iqbal. Later, he started directing films individually.

== Selected filmography ==
- Gaddari
- Tomar Jonyo Morte Pari
- Prem Mane Na Badha
- Machine Man
- Boro Bhai Zindabad
- O Sathi Re
- Dhakar King
- Prem Prem Paglami
- Purno Doirgho Prem Kahini
- Bhalobasha Express
- Faand: The Trap
- Honeymoon
- Big Brother (2015)
- Warning (2015)
- Black Money (2015)
- Purno Doirgho Prem Kahini 2 (2016)
- Missed Call (2017)
