= Pori Moni =

Bangladeshi actress (born 1992)

- পরীমণি
- Pori Moni in 2017
- Born: Shamsunnahar Smrity; 24 October 1992 (age 34); Satkhira, Khulna, Bangladesh
- Occupation: Actress
- Years active: 2013–present
- Spouses: Ismail Hosain (m. 2010; div. 2012) Ferdous Kabir Sourav (m. 2012; div. 2014) Tamim Hasan (m. 2017; div. 2019) Kamruzzaman Roni (m. 2020; div. 2020) Sariful Razz (m. 2021; div. 2023)
- Children: 1
- Awards: Full list
- Website: porimoni.aboutbio.info

Shamsunnahar Smrity (Note: Bengali: শামসুন্নাহার স্মৃতি, romanized: Śāmsunnāhār Smr̥ti, [ˈʃamsunːaˌɦaɾ ˈsmiɾti]) (born 24 October 1992), known by her stage name Pori Moni (Note: Bengali: পরী মনি, romanized: Porī Moni, [ˈpoɾi ˈmoni]), is a Bangladeshi film actress. Media reports have described her as one of Bangladesh’s highest-paid actresses.

She began her career as a model and made her film debut in Rana Plaza (2015). She received wider recognition for Dhumketu (2016), a commercial success. Her other films include Antor Jala (2017), Swapnajaal (2018) and Gunin (2022). She won the Special Critic Award at the 21st Meril-Prothom Alo Awards, and in 2020 was listed in Forbes Asia's “100 Digital Stars”.

== Birth and early life ==
Pori Moni was born in December 1992 in Singhakali village of Bhandaria Upazila in Pirojpur District, Bangladesh, at her maternal grandparents' home. Her ancestral home is in Baka village of Salabad Union under Kalia Upazila in Narail District. Her family name is Shamsunnahar Smriti. Towards the end of the 1990s, Pori Moni's mother, Salma Sultana, was mysteriously and severely burned in an accident at a residence in Dhaka. (Note: Sources differ regarding the exact time of Pori Moni's mother's death. According to some sources, her mother died between 2007 and 2008, but most sources agree that Pori Moni was two and a half to three years old at the time of her mother's death. Additionally, Pori Moni stated in a media interview that she was two and a half years old when her mother died. There are sufficient reasons and evidence to consider the first opinion, i.e., the 1995–96 timeline, as accurate.) At that time, Pori's father, Monirul Islam, felt helpless with his three-year-old child, Pori Moni. He had his burn-injured wife treated at a hospital in Dhaka for a few days, during which he left Pori with her maternal grandfather, Shamsul Haq Gazi. Two months later, Pori's mother passed away while undergoing treatment in the hospital, leaving Pori Moni motherless at the age of three. Belayet Hossain (Note: Belayet Hossain is the headmaster of South Singhakali Government Primary School, the school where Pori Moni studied in her early life, where Pori Moni's maternal grandmother, Fatima Begum, was a former teacher. After Fatima's death, Belayet became the headmaster of that school.) describing Pori Moni's childhood events, further stated that the three-year-old child Pori Moni was raised from then on by her maternal grandparents and maternal aunt.

Later, her father also passed away. Explaining the murder of Pori Moni's father, her younger maternal aunt Taslima Papiya stated that Smriti's father, Monirul Islam, was a police constable in Lohagara Upazila of Narail District. (Note: A similar account was described by Mohammad Jahangir Kabir, principal of Bangabandhu Sheikh Mujibur Rahman Degree College, who was a student of Pori Moni's maternal grandfather Shamsul Haq Gazi during the establishment of Bhagirathpur School when Gazi served as the founding headmaster.) In 2012, he lost his job for a specific reason and since then had been living at his village home and engaging in business. Taslima Papiya further added that she heard opponents might have hacked Monirul to death over a dispute related to that business. Young Pori Moni grew up under the care of her maternal grandfather, Shamsul Haq Gazi, in Pirojpur.

=== Education ===
Both of Pori Moni's maternal grandparents were school teachers. She passed SSC from Bhagirathpur Secondary School in Mathbaria Upazila. Afterwards, she enrolled in eleventh grade at Bangabandhu Sheikh Mujibur Rahman Degree College in Mathbaria Upazila, but did not begin her studies there. According to Jahangir Kabir, the principal of the college, "Smriti came to enroll around 2011–12 with a GPA of 3.5 from Bhagirathpur Secondary School, but after enrolling, she did not attend the college." Instead, while studying for a bachelor's degree in Bengali at Satkhira Government College, she moved to Dhaka in 2011 and learned dancing at the Bulbul Academy of Fine Arts.

== Career ==
Moni's first film, Rana Plaza, based on the Rana Plaza disaster, was denied certification by the Bangladesh Film Censor Board, who stated that it was a national disaster that people may misunderstand. Her second film Bhalobasha Shimaheen was released on 13 February 2015. She co-starred with Shakib Khan in Aro Bhalobashbo Tomay and Dhumketu.

== Personal life ==
Moni married her cousin, Ismail Hossain, in 2010 and divorced him in 2012. She then married footballer Ferdous Kabir Sourav in April 2012. In 2019, Moni was engaged to RJ Tamim Hasan, but later they broke up. In 2020, she was married to film director Kamruzzaman Roni for a short period.

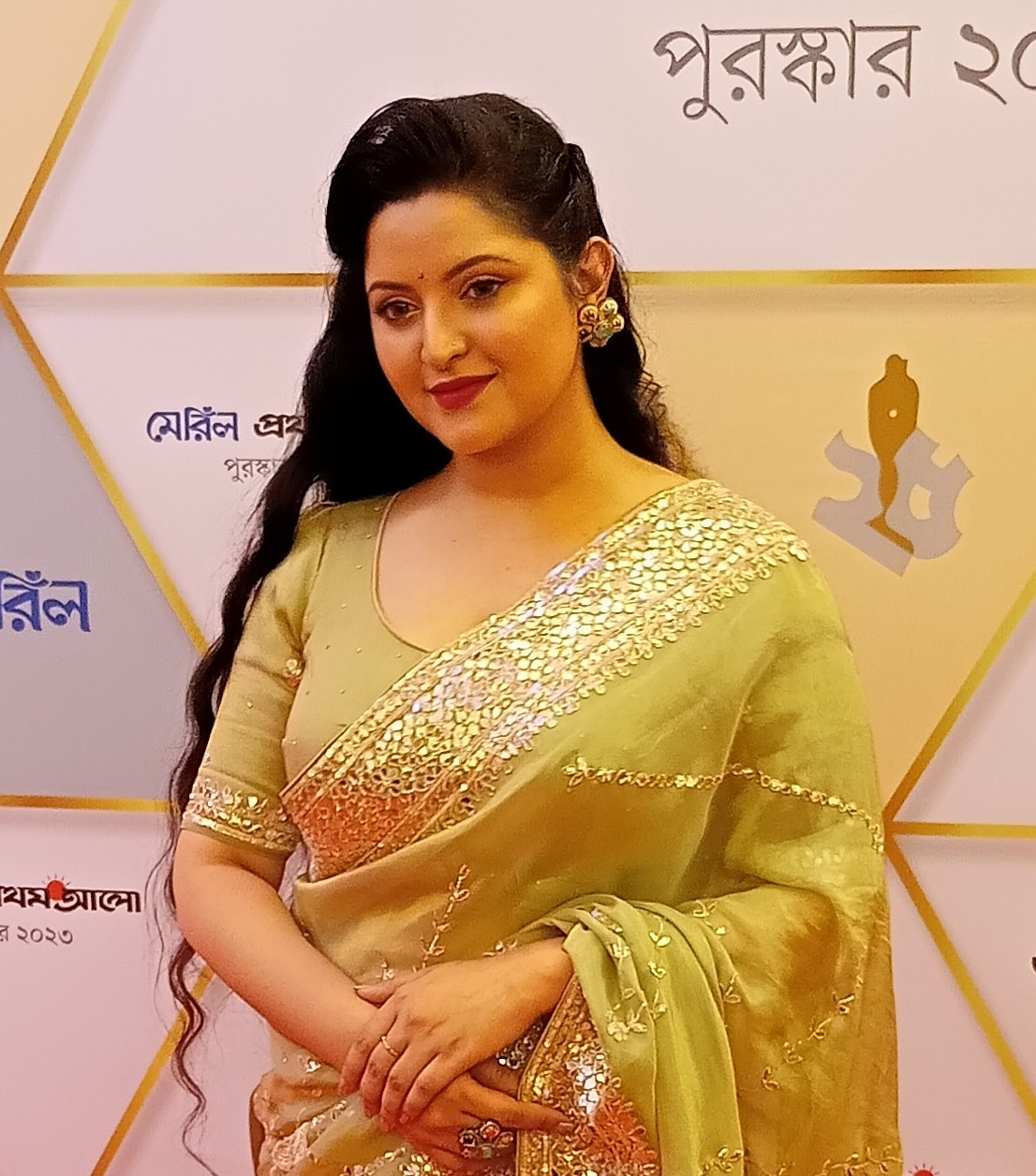
Pori Moni in 2024

In October 2021, she married actor-model Sariful Razz. They have a son, Shaheem Muhammad Punno (also Rajya), born on 10 August 2022. On 31 December 2022, Moni confirmed her separation with Razz via social media later stating that she left his house with son Rajya a day prior. Later on, they patched up and started living together again on-and-off. After alleging several relationships of Razz with other actresses, including Tanjin Tisha, Nazifa Tushi, and Sunerah Binte Kamal, Moni divorced him on 18 September 2023.

29 October 2024, actress Parimony in a program on Bangladeshi OTT platform Hoichoi

In May 2024, Moni revealed that she had adopted a girl, Safeera Sultana Priom, in an online post written on Anandabazar Patrika.

== Controversies ==
On 8 June 2021, Moni accused Nasir Uddin Mahmood, a businessman and politician of the Jatiya Party, of sexual assault on her at the Boat Club in Ashulia, Uttara. She asked Prime Minister Sheikh Hasina for justice on Facebook. On 14 June, Mahmood and businessman Tuhin Siddique Omi were arrested by the Bangladesh Police, but Mahmood was later released on bail. A week later, Moni was accused of vandalism at the Gulshan All Community Club. The club's president, K.M. Alamgir Iqbal, accused her of vandalizing the club on the night of 7 June at a press conference. However, on 18 April 2024, Police Bureau of Investigation (PBI) submitted an investigation report that found proof of a murder attempt on Nasir Uddin Mahmud by Pori Moni and her costume designer Junayed Bogdadai Jimmy and vandalism inside the club.

=== Detention ===
On 4 August 2021, the Rapid Action Battalion (RAB) raided Moni's house in Banani. She was arrested on alleged charges of possessing lysergic acid diethylamide, crystal methamphetamine, and 30 bottles of foreign liquor from the house. On 5 August, Dhaka court magistrate Mamunur Rashid granted a 4-day remand against Moni, film producer Nazrul Islam Raj, and two of their associates in connection with separate narcotics cases filed under the Narcotics Control Act 1990. On 31 August, Dhaka Metropolitan Sessions Judge KM Imrul Kayes granted Moni bail and she was released the next morning after 27 days of detention.

== Works ==
=== Films ===
Key
†	Denotes films that have not yet been released

Year	Film	Role	Notes	Ref.
2015	Bhalobasha Simahin	Simana		
2015	Pagla Deewana	Layla		
2015	Aro Bhalobashbo Tomay	Nolok		
2015	Lover Number One	Dola		
2015	Nagar Mastan	Pori		
2015	Mohua Sundori	Mohua		
2016	Pure Jay Mon	Kiron		
2016	Rokto	Sania		
2016	Dhumketu	Rukh Moni		
2017	Antor Jala	Sona		
2017	Apon Manush	Kiron		
2017	Innocent Love	Pari		
2017	Koto Shopno Koto Asha	Pori		
2017	Shona Bondhu	Kajol		
2018	Swapnajaal	Shuvra		
2019	Amar Prem Amar Priya	Jannat		
2020	Bishwoshundori	Shova		
2021	Sphulingo	Diba		
2022	Mukhosh	Sohana		
2022	Gunin	Rabeya		
2023	Adventure of Sundarbans	Trisha		
2023	Maa	Beena	Based on Bangladesh Liberation War	
2023	Puff Daddy	Tina	Released on Bongo BD	
2024	Kagojer Bou	Titli		
2025	Felubakshi	Labanya	Debut in Indian Bengali film	
2026	Separation †	TBA	Filming	
TBA	Nodir Buke Chaad †	Nodi		
TBA	Pritilata †	Pritilata Waddedar		
TBA	Rana Plaza †	Reshma		
TBA	Dodor Golpo †	Kajol Chowdhury		
TBA	1971 Shei Shob Din †	TBA		
TBA	Amar Mon Jure Tui †	TBA		
TBA	Bahaduri †	TBA		
TBA	Dorodiya †	TBA		
TBA	Probashi Don †	TBA		
TBA	Surprise †	TBA		

=== Television ===
Year	Title	Role	Notes	Ref.
2012	Exclusive Extra Bachelor		Television film	
2013–2014	2nd Innings		Drama serial on Asian TV	
2014	Mon Bhalo Nai		Television film	
2014	Kotha Dilam		Television film	
2014	Nabanita		Television film	
2015	Tumar Janno		Television film	
2015	Apar Opar		Television film	
2015	Nari		Television film	
2024	Rongila Kitab	Supti	Series on Hoichoi	

=== Short films ===
Year	Title	Role	Notes	Ref.
2018	Preeti	Preeti	Released on Bioscope	
2024	Booking	Tania	Released on Bongo BD	

== Awards ==
Year	Award	Category	Film	Result	Ref
2016	Babisas Award	Featured movie actress	Mohua Sundori	Won	
2019	Meril-Prothom Alo Awards	Special Critics Award	Swapnajaal	Won	
2019	Meril-Prothom Alo Awards	Best Film Actress	Swapnajaal	Nominated	
2019	Meril-Prothom Alo Awards	Best Film Actress (Critics)	Swapnajaal	Nominated	
2019	India-Bangladesh Film Awards	Popular actress	Amar Prem Amar Prya	Won	
2020	CJFB Performance Award	Best Actress (Critic)	Amar Prem Amar Prya	Won	
2021	CJFB Performance Award	Best actress	Bishwoshundori	Won	
2024	Blender's Choice–The Daily Star OTT & Digital Content Awards	Best actress	Rongila Kitab	Won	
