= Achol =

Bangladeshi film actress (born 1992)

Achol Akhee
- আঁচল
- Born: Hasna Hena Akhee; August 26, 1992 (age 34); Khulna, Bangladesh
- Occupation: Film actress
- Years active: 2011–present
- Notable work: Filmography, Web series
- Spouse: Syed Omy
- Parents: Md. Hafizur Rahman (father); Salma Begum (mother)

Hasna Hena Akhee Achol, known by her stage name Achol Akhee (Bengali: আচঁল), is a Bangladeshi film actress who appears in Dhallywood films. She made her debut in the film Bhool, released in 2011. After making the appearance in the 2013 romantic film Jotil Prem, Achol's early years in the film industry have been successful.

== Filmography ==
Year	Title	Role	Director	Notes
2011	Bhool	Lakshmi	Raju Ahmed	Debut Film
2011	Bailey Road	Achol	Masud Kaynat	
2012	Bhalobashar Rongdhanu			
2013	Jotil Prem	Rumki	Shaheen Sumon	Released on 17 May 2013
2013	Prem Prem Paglaami	Simi	Shafi Uddin Shafi	Released on 21 June 2013
2013	Ki Prem Dekhaila	Nila	Shah Mohammad Songram	Released on 15 October 2013
2014	Faand: The Trap	Nova	Shafi Uddin Shafi	Released on 30 May 2014
2014	Kistimaat	Piya	Ashiqur Rahman	
2014	Shopno Je Tui	Jerry	Monirul Islam Sohel	
2014	Prem Manei Kosto	–		
2015	Ajob Prem		Wazed Ali Sumon	
2015	Bojhena Se Bojhena		Montazur Rahman Akbar	
2015	Hridoy Dolano Prem		Abul Kalam Azad	
2015	Gunda: The Terrorist	Trishna	Ispahani Arif Jahan	
2015	Epar Opar	Padmo	Delwar Jahan Jhantu	
2016	Aral		Shahed Chowdhury	
2016	Mental	Achol/Mehruba Siddiqui	Shamim Ahamed Roni	
2017	Sultana Bibiana		Himel Ashraf	
2019	Daag Hridoye	Nabila	Tarek Shikder	
2022	Mafia	Jerin	Touhid Hossain Chowdhury	
2022	Raagi		Mizanur Rahman Mizan	

=== Web series ===
Year	Title	OTT	Character	Director	Notes
2018	Indubala			Anonno Mamun	
2020	Dhoka			Anonno Mamun	
2020	Journey			Anonno Mamun	
