= Omar Sani =

Bangladeshi actor

- ওমর সানী
- Born: Mohammad Omar Sani; 6 May 1968 (age 57); Barisal, East Pakistan
- Occupation: Actor
- Years active: 1990–present
- Notable work: Coolie
- Spouse: Moushumi (m. 1996)
- Children: 2
- Relatives: Shuchanda (aunt); Bobita (aunt); Champa (aunt); Riaz (uncle)

Mohammad Omar Sani (born 6 May 1968) is a Bangladeshi film and television actor. He made his debut as a lead role with the film Chader Alo (1993), directed by Shekh Nozrul Islam

== Career ==
Sani's film debut was in the 1993 film Chader Alo, directed by Shaikh Najrul Islam Khan. He acted in Prem Protishodh (1993) and Mohoth (1994). He met his future wife, Moushumi, at the film Dola (1994), and his first with Sadika Parvin Popy was Coolie (1997), directed by Montazur Rahman Akbar. In 2003 he performed as an antagonist for the first time in Uttam Akash's action film Ora Dalal, starring opposite Shakib Khan and Rachna Banerjee. Subsequently, he also achieved success as a villain. After a 13-year hiatus from the film industry, he appeared in the film Ami Tumi Se, Pagol Tor Jonnore, Ajob Prem in 2013.

== Personal life ==
Omar Sani comes from a family with strong ties to the Dhallywood movie industry and well established actors in their own rights. On 2 August 1996, Sani married actress Moushumi. They have a son, Fardin Ehsan Shadin, and a daughter, Faiza.

== Filmography ==
Year	Film	Role	Notes	Ref.
1992	Ei Niye Songsar	Inspector Asad	Debut film	
1993	Chader Alo	Chad	Debut as lead role	
1993	Prem Protishodh			
1993	Banglar Bodhu			
1993	Prem Geet	Raju		
1994	Mohoth			
1994	Akheri Hamla			
1994	Chander Hashi			
1994	Dola	Saikat		
1995	Atto Ohongkar			
1996	Sukher Swargo			
1997	Coolie	Raju		
1997	Ke Oporadhi			
1998	Sabbash Bangali			
1998	Shanti Chai			
1998	Tumi Sundor			
1998	Lat Shaheber Meya			
1999	Kanchanmala			
1999	Goriber Somman			
1999	Monafeq			
1999	Goribrao Manush			
2003	Ora Dalal			
2004	Amar Bou	Sagor		
2006	Bidrohi Salahuddin			
2006	Dadima	Zaman Kha		
2007	Khesarot			
2007	Nishidhdho Prem			
2008	Raju Amar Bhai			
2008	Tumi Koto Sundor			
2009	Swami Streer Wada			
2009	Mayer Hate Behester Chabi			
2013	Ami Tumi Se			
2013	Pagol Tor Jonno Re			
2015	Rajababu: The Power			
2015	Ajob Prem			
2016	Kalo Ratri			
2016	Lal Sobujer Sur			
2017	Mar Chokka			
2017	Shunno			
2018	Ami Neta Hobo	Sakku's brother in law		
2018	Chittagainga Powa Noakhailla Maiya			
2019	Nolok	Juwel Mahmud		
2024	Shonar Chor			
2024	Dead Body			
