= Mahiya Mahi =

Bangladeshi actress (born 1993)

- মাহিয়া মাহি
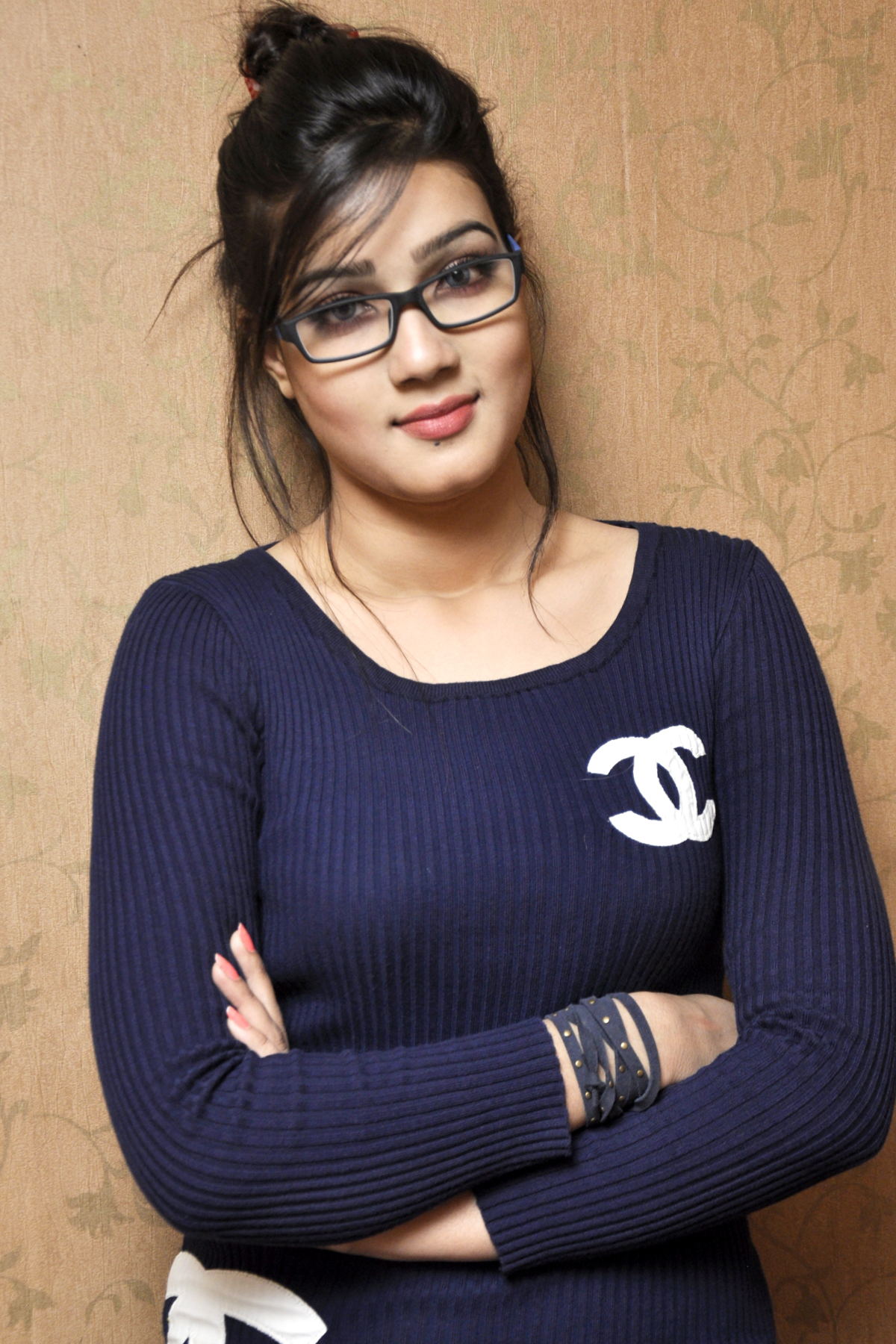
- Mahi in 2014
- Born: 27 October 1993 (age 33); Tanore, Rajshahi District, Bangladesh
- Occupation: Actress
- Years active: 2012–present
- Spouse: Mahmud Pervez Opu (m. 2016; div. 2021) Rakib Sarker (m. 2021)
- Children: 1

Sharmin Akter Nipa (born 27 October 1993) known by her stage name Mahiya Mahi, is a Bangladeshi film actress and model who worked in Dhallywood cinema. She was one of the highest-paid actresses of Bangladesh.

Mahi started her career in the film industry with the film Bhalobasar Rong in 2012, which was a commercial success. (Note: multiple sources:) Since then, she has acted in several other films, including PoraMon (2013), Agnee (2014) and Desha: The Leader (2014). She has won several awards for her performances, including the Meril-Prothom Alo Awards for Best Actress in 2014. In 2024, Mahiya Mahi starred in the film Rajkumar, which became a major box office success that year.

== Early life and education ==
Mahi was born on 27 October 1994 in Mundumala, Tanore Upazila in Rajshahi district. Mahi completed her SSC from Uttara High School and HSC from Dhaka City College. She studied in fashion designing in 2014 before switching universities in 2015.

== Career ==
Mahi made her acting debut with Bhalobasar Rong in 2012, opposite another debutante Bappy Chowdhury. Bhalobashar Rong is referred as the first Bangladeshi digital cinema according to Jaaz Multimedia. The film was declared as a huge financial success.

In 2013, Mahi appeared in four films. Her first release was Onnorokom Bhalobasha. Again opposite to Bappy Chowdhury. Her next release was PoraMon, opposite to Symon Sadik. She was reported as "a new sensation" by all Bangladeshi media. The Daily Ittefaq and Asian TV program Movie Bazaar has declared Mahi as the best actress of 2013.

She was named brand ambassador of several companies including, Uro Cola, Fair & Lovely. and Goodwill.

Her third film of the year marked her first collaboration with actor Shakib Khan as they were paired up in Bhalobasha Aaj Kal for the first time. The couple was received positive response from the audience and also the film received positive reviews and became as a superhit at box office upon release. Also, was highest-grossing film of Jaaz Multimedia production till Shikari (2016) released. The Daily Star noted about the film, "The Shakib Khan and Mahiya Mahi duo was adorable". New Age reported, "'Shakib-Mahi duo is very well-matched. Paired up with heartthrob Shakib Khan, Mahi won the hearts of the film lovers through her acting in Bhalobasha Aaj Kal". Her last release was Tobuo Bhalobashi, once again opposite to Bappy Chowdhury.

Mahi's first release in 2014 is Ki Darun Dekhte. Her next and long-awaited movie Agnee, opposite to Arifin Shuvoo, is a women-centric crime thriller film. It became one of the most commercially successful films in Dhallywood history. Agnee brought Mahi 'Best Film Actress' for the 1st time from Meril Prothom Alo Awards in 2014.

Dobir Saheber Songsar is the first comedy film performed by Mahi. She played three roles at a time in this film. It did average in the box office. Her Next film is "Honeymoon" with Bappy Chowdhury and director by Shafi Uddin Shafi. Honeymoon relies time of eid ul fitr & production house of Jaaz Multimedia.

Onek Sadher Moyna released on 7 November. It is the remake of film 'Moyna-Moti' of 1969 played by the legends Abdur Razzak and Kabori. The film did excellent in the box office.

In the film Desha: The Leader, Mahi plays the role of a journalist, opposite Shipan Mitra. For the first time she will be found as a lyricist in this film.

In 2015, she starred as Juliet in Romeo vs Juliet opposite Joey Debroy and Ankush Hazra, directed by Ashok Pati. She played the title role in Shafi Uddin Shafi's Big Brother, opposite Shipan Mitra and played the role of a journalist in Warning, opposite Arifin Shuvoo. Mahi also starred in Agnee 2, the sequel to Agnee. She became the brand ambassador of Unilever's beauty brand Fair & Lovely in April 2014.

In late 2020, she played as an advocate in the Anonno Mamun's fictional courtroom drama Nabab LLB.

In 2024, she collaborate with Shakib Khan after 4 year of Nabab LLB (2020) with an extended cameo appearance as 65-year-old Khan's mother in Himel Ashraf's melodrama Rajkumar. Mahi's character received mixed reviews upon its release.

=== Politics ===
Mahi sought nomination from the Awami League to run from the Chapai Nawabganj-2 constituency for the 2024 Bangladeshi general election. But Awami League nominated the candidacy to the incumbent Md. Ziaur Rahman. Mahi then pursued as an independent candidate from the Rajshahi-1 constituency. But she lost the election, held on 7 January 2024, to the incumbent Awami League candidate, Omor Faruk Chowdhury.

== Legal issues ==
On 17 March 2023, Mahi and her husband live-streamed a video on her Facebook page in which they made allegations against the police. When she returned to Bangladesh from Saudi Arabia the following day, she was arrested at Hazrat Shahjalal International Airport by the Gazipur Metropolitan Police. She was charged under the Digital Security Act with of making 'false and defamatory' comments on social media, and in a second case with committing violence and extortion related to a land dispute. She was released on bail a few hours later and the case has since been dismissed, after widespread outrage over the utilization of the Digital Security Act.

== Personal life ==
Mahi was first married to Mahmud Pervez Opu, a businessman from Sylhet, during 2016–2021. On 13 September 2021, she married Rakib Sarker, a businessman and politician from Gazipur. The couple have a son, Mosaib Arosh Shamsuddin Farish Sarker, aged 3 years, 7 months. On 16 February 2024, Mahi announced her divorce with Sarker in a video on her social media profile. On October 18, 2025, Mahi once again made a marriage-related post on her Facebook. Although she had announced her separation about a year and a half ago, this time she revealed herself, "Our divorce actually never happened."

== Filmography ==
Key
†	Denotes films that have not yet been released

Year	Film	Role	Notes	Ref.
2012	Bhalobasar Rong	Mahi / Faria	Debut film	
2013	Onnorokom Bhalobasha	Mishti		
2013	PoraMon	Pori		
2013	Bhalobasa Aaj Kal	Dana		
2013	Tobou Bhalobashi	Sunoina		
2014	Ki Darun Dekhte	Mahi		
2014	Agnee	Tanisha		
2014	Dobir Saheber Songsar	Chumki		
2014	Honeymoon	Tandra Islam Chowdhury		
2014	Onek Sadher Moyna	Moyna		
2014	Desha: The Leader	Sristi		
2015	Romeo vs Juliet	Juliet	Indo-Bangladesh joint production	
2015	Big Brother	Kajal		
2015	Warning	Trina Hasan		
2015	Agnee 2	Tanisha	Indo-Bangladesh joint production	
2016	Krishnopokkho	Oru		
2016	Onek Dame Kena	Poshpo		
2017	Dhaka Attack	Chaity		
2018	Poloke Poloke Tomake Chai	Bonna		
2018	Jannat	Jannat		
2018	Mone Rekho	Moon		
2018	Pobitro Bhalobasha	Rosie		
2018	Tui Sudhu Amar	Priya		
2019	Ondhokar Jogot	Inspector Shobnom		
2019	Obotar	Mukti		
2020	Nabab LLB	Abanti Chowdhury		
2022	Mafia	Zara / Chhaya		
2022	Ashirbad	Subarna	Based on Bangladesh Liberation War	
2022	Live	Joya Biswas		
2022	Jao Pakhi Bolo Tare	Lavly		
2023	Bubujaan	Bubujaan		
2024	Rajkumar	Musammad Khadija Begum	Extended cameo	
2026	Officer			
2026	Anondo Osru	Shirin		
TBA	Antarjami †	TBA	Filming	

=== Short films ===
Year	Title	Role	Director	Notes
2019	Jibon Theke Paoya	Mukti	Saidur Rahman Sajal	
2020	Oxygen	Maya	Raihan Rafi	
2021	Eida Kopal	Bioscope	Raihan Rafi	A Bioscope short film

=== Web series ===
Year	Title	OTT	Character	Director	Notes
2021	Morichika	Chorki	Bonnie	Shihab Shaheen	
2022	The Driver	Bioscope	Superstar Shehnaz	Iftakar Chowdhury	

=== Music video ===
Year	Song	Singer	Director
2018	"Lal Sobuj" (Cricket Song)	Dinat Jahan Munni, Ayub Shahriar, Sabbir Zaman, Ahmad Humayun, Ronty Das, Tasnim Aurin, Arif & Masum	Ziauddin Alam

== Awards and nominations ==
Year	Awards	Category	Film	Result
2013	Meril Prothom Alo Awards	Best Film Actress	Onnorokom Bhalobasha	Nominated
2013	Bachsas Awards	Best Film Actress	Bhalobasha Aaj Kal	Won
2013	Bioscope Borsho-Shera Awards	Best Film Actress	PoraMon	Nominated
2013	Bioscope Borsho-Sera Awards	Best Couple (with Symon Sadik)	PoraMon	
2014	Meril Prothom Alo Awards	Best Film Actress	Agnee	Won
2015	Meril Prothom Alo Awards	Best Film Actress	Romeo vs Juliet	Nominated
2016	Meril Prothom Alo Awards	Best Film Actress	Krishnopokkho	Nominated
2021	Meril Prothom Alo Awards	Best Film Actress	Nabab LLB	Nominated
