= Shakib Khan filmography =

Bangladeshi film actor, producer, occasional singer, film organiser and media personality

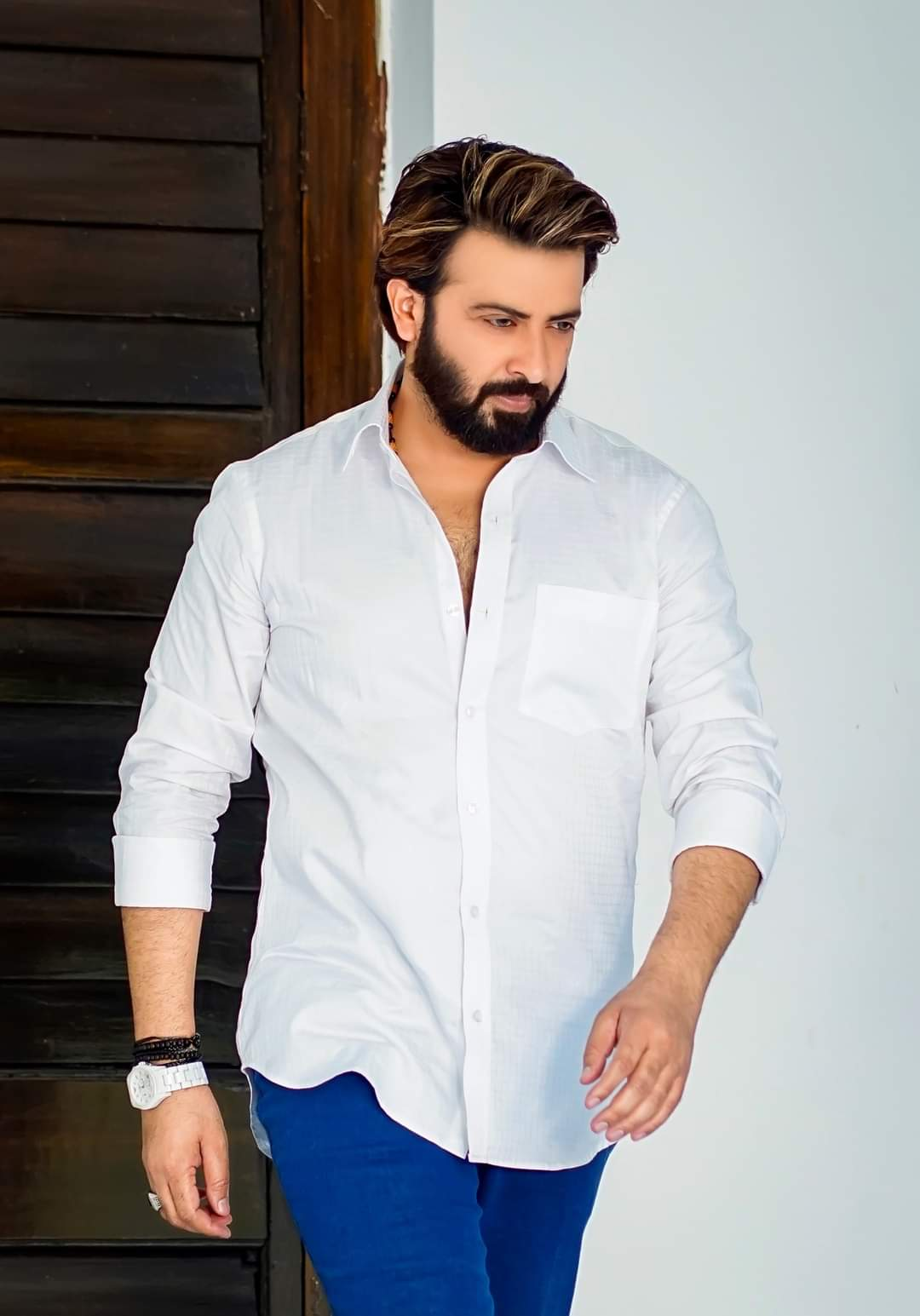
- Shakib Khan
- Film: 256

Shakib Khan (Bengali: শাকিব খান) is a Bangladeshi film actor, producer, occasional singer, film organiser and media personality who works in Bangladeshi Bengali films, with a handful of movies in West Bengal. Khan has prolific career spanning over two decades, during which he has appeared in more than 250 films (Note: Multiple sources) and described as one of the most successful actors in Bangladesh. Most of his films were commercially and critically successful.

Khan is one of the most recognizable star of the present era of Bangladeshi film industry. As one of the most dominant actors in the Bangladeshi movie scene during the 2000s, 2010s and early 2020s, Khan is widely considered as one of the greatest and influential actors in the history of Bangladeshi cinema. He is critically acclaimed as one of the finest actors of Bangladesh. Following his debut in Sohanur Rahman Sohan's 1999 action romantic Ananta Bhalobasha, Khan did not lead to widespread fame, although his on-camera debut was with the Aftab Khan Tulu's romance Sobaito Sukhi Hote Chay, which was released the in following year. Subsequently, Khan established himself as one of the most successful actors in Bengali cinema. The Badiul Alam Khokon-directed Priya Amar Priya (2008) in which Khan played a college student with careless attitude, was a major commercial success in his career, which set several box office records. It is the highest grossing Bangladeshi film of 2008 and also one of the highest grossing Bangladeshi films of all-time. And also the highest grossing film of Khan's career until it was surpassed by his 2023 all-time blockbuster Priyotoma. After the release of the film, Khan gained widespread fame shortly and gained a large number of fan following. He is popularly known in the media as "King Khan" and "King of Dhallywood", "Megastar", "Superstar", "Number One Shakib Khan" (Initialism as No1SK), also referred as "Dhallywood Bhaijaan". Currently he is the highest paid actor in Bangladesh. (Note: Khan was paid ৳5 million for the film Nolok. However, according to the producer of the 2022 film Bidrohi, he took a fee of ৳6 million for the film Bidrohi. Although both are the highest remuneration in Bangladeshi cinema.)

Khan has earned numerous accolades in his long career, including 4 National Film Awards, 8 Meril Prothom Alo Awards, 3 Bachsas Awards and 4 CJFB Performance Awards. His 2010 success was Bhalobaslei Ghor Bandha Jay Na, which earned him his first National Film Awards for Best Actor, in which he played as an independent young man, who stands against the injustice of his family, 2012's Khodar Pore Ma, 2015's Aro Bhalobashbo Tomay and 2017's Swatta.

His other notable films are including drama film Shuva (2006) based on the Rabindranath Tagore's novel Shuvashini, which is received him the highest accolades for his performance, romantic melodrama Amar Praner Swami (2007) earned him his first Meril-Prothom Alo Awards for Best Actor, which was also became the highest grossing film of 2007, romance comedy Priya Amar Priya (2008) and Bolbo Kotha Bashor Ghore (2009), romance comedy Adorer Jamai (2011), action drama Don Number One (2012), romance drama Purnodoirgho Prem Kahini (2013) was the first sequel in his career, which was the longest running film of that year, action thriller Shikari (2016) and Nabab's (2017) new look garnered him praised from the audience and critics and earned him worldwide recognition. Bulbul Biswas' political drama Rajneeti (2017) considered the politics of Bangladesh, which created controversy over the country. Hashibur Reza Kallol's tragic romance Swatta (2017) won numerous accolades including five National Film Awards, six Bachsas Awards, two Meril-Prothom Alo Awards and earned him fourth National Film Awards for Best Actor. His Joydeep Mukherjee's romantic melodrama Bhaijaan Elo Re (2018) and romance comedy Chalbaaz (2018) and Rajiv Kumar Biswas' supernatural-thriller Naqaab (2018) earned him success in India, considered to be one of the best performances of his career. In 2011, he made his debut as a playback singer in the film of Moner Jala. In 2014, he made his debut as a producer with the film Hero: The Superstar and subsequently produced films like Password (2019), which was successful at box office and became the only highest grossing film of 2019 and also one of the highest grossing films of all-time, and Bir (2020) won National Film Awards twice at the 45th Bangladesh National Film Awards, all of which were commercially successes, which establishing him as a successful producer. His worldwide success was tragic romance Priyotoma (2023), which broke several box-office records, thus re-establishing Khan's stardom. The film has the fastest gross figure collection in the history of Bangladeshi Cinema and became the highest grossing Bangladeshi film of all-time with a gross collection ৳41.23 crore (US$3.4 million). Also the highest-grossing film of Khan's career surpassing his 2008 blockbuster Priya Amar Priya.

== As actor ==
Key
†	Denotes films that have not yet been released

Year	Title	Role	Notes	Ref.
1999	Ananta Bhalobasha	Moshal	Debut film	(Note: multiple sources:)
1999	Dujon Dujonar	Sagor		
1999	Ajker Dapot	Biplob		
2000	Bishe Bhora Nagin	Nagraj / Mohon (Note: Khan played a single character with two or more names in the film.)		
2000	Hira Chuni Panna	Rahul		
2000	Janer Jaan	Sagor		
2000	Sobaito Sukhi Hote Chay	Akash	First time stand on camera	
2000	Oshantir Agun	Raja		
2000	Golam	Raja		
2000	Palta Hamla	Sohel		
2000	Kosom Banglar Mati	Hasan		
2000	Bishakto Nagin	Nagraj / Raja		
2000	Phool Nebo Na Osru Nebo	Akash		
2001	Kothin Shasti	Shohag		
2001	Ajker Kedar	Akash		
2001	Dushmon Dorodi	Sagor		
2001	Dui Nagin	Shish Nag		
2001	Mejaj Gorom	Raja		
2001	Himmat	Sumon		
2001	Thekao Mastan	Biplob		
2001	Baap Betir Juddho	Raj		
2001	Bishwo Batpar	Rana		
2001	Bondhu Jokhon Shotru	Jibon		
2001	Shikari	Babu		
2001	Gono Dushmon	ASP Shakib Khan (Note: Khan played role with his real name in the film)		
2001	Nater Guru	Rana		
2001	Nachnewali	Omar		
2001	Swapner Bashor	Badol		
2001	Daku Rani	Bishal		
2002	Juddhe Jabo	Manik		
2002	Mukhoshdhari	Bijoy		
2002	Juari	Raju		
2002	Pagla Baba	Noyon		
2002	Boba Khuni	Badol		
2002	Vondo Ojha	Akbar		
2002	Uttejito	Akash Chowdhury		
2002	Bhoyonkor Porinaam	Raja		
2002	Hingshar Poton	Antor		
2002	Lohar Shikol	Shikol		
2002	Khalnayika	Raja		
2002	Strir Morjada	Rasel		
2002	Mayer Jihad	Jihad		
2002	Dosshu	Bhashon		
2002	Porena Chokher Polok	Anik		
2002	Sobar Upore Prem	Sagor		
2002	Moron Nishan	OC Ziddi		
2002	O Priya Tumi Kothay	Akash		
2003	Khomotar Dapot	Shanto		
2003	Hingsha Protihingsha	Raju		
2003	Humkir Mukhe	Murad		
2003	Ora Dalal	Sultan		
2003	Bahadur Sontan	Bahadur		
2003	Boro Malik	Babla		
2003	Danger	Biplob Khan		
2003	Praner Manush	Raj	Nominated — Meril-Prothom Alo Awards for Best Actor	
2003	Shahoshi Manush Chai	Anik Parvez		
2003	Ora Shahoshi	Joy / Raju		
2003	Noyon Bhora Jol	Anik		
2003	Rukhe Darao	Sagor		
2003	Underworld	Babla		
2003	Prem Sanghat	Raju		
2004	Palta Akromon	Badshah		
2004	Gurudeb	Shakib / Gurudeb		
2004	Varate Khuni	Agun		
2004	Hridoy Shudhu Tomar Jonno	Raju		
2004	Last Target	Biplob		
2004	Noshto	Munna		
2004	Mayer Hater Bala	Munna / Mamun		
2004	Dhor Soytan	Durjoy Chowdhury		
2004	Jyanto Lash	Rasel Khan		
2004	Bostir Rani Suriya	Mishqatur Rahman	In 2005, the Bangladesh Film Censor Board permanently revoked the film's license and banned its screening throughout Bangladesh	
2004	Khuni Shikder	Shahjahan Shikder / Boro Dada (Note: Khan portrait life of Bangladeshi criminal and serial killer Ershad Sikder, who was sentenced to death for murder, and subsequently executed on May 10, 2004.)		
2004	Jaat Shotru	Duronto Chowdhury		
2004	Ajker Somaj	Biplob		
2004	Somajer Shotru	Raju		
2005	Durdhorsho	Agun		
2005	Ranga Mastan	Badol		
2005	Bad Son	Babu / Bijoy		
2005	Top Leader	Sagor		
2005	Nagna Hamla	Songram		
2005	Nikhoj Songbad	Rasha		
2005	Amar Shopno Tumi	Sumon		
2005	City Terror	Bullet		
2005	Shuva	Protap Goswami	Nominated — Meril-Prothom Alo Awards for Best Actor	
2005	Dui Number	Polash		
2005	Badha	Apon Khan		
2005	Lalu Koshai	Robi		
2006	Mayer Morjada	Badhon		
2006	Hotline	Niru		
2006	Koti Takar Kabin	Fahim Talukder		
2006	Saat Khoon Maaf	Babul		
2006	Jonmo	Sagor		
2006	Pitar Ason	Selim Ahmed		
2006	Rongin Rosher Baidani	Selim		
2006	Hingshro Manob	Durjoy		
2006	Chachchu	Biplob Chowdhury	Nominated — Meril Prothom Alo Awards for Best Actor	
2006	Nishpap Koyedi	Bishal Chowdhury		
2006	Dhakaiya Pola Barishaler Maiya	Maqbool		
2006	Noshto Chhatra	Sagor		
2006	Dadima	Akash Khan	100th film	
2007	Jomoj	Ronny / Rocky / Imran (Note: Khan first time ever played dual roles and triple characters in the film.)		
2007	Swamir Songshar	Fardin Hossain Pran / Poran		
2007	Doctor Bari	Akkel Ali		
2007	Amar Praner Swami	Raju	Won — Meril-Prothom Alo Critics Awards for Best Actor; Nominated — Meril Prothom Alo Awards for Best Actor	
2007	Tui Jodi Amar Hoiti Re	Babur Chowdhury		
2007	Kotha Dao Sathi Hobe	Jibon		
2007	Tomar Jonno Morte Pari	Joy		
2007	Kopal	Ali		
2007	Maa Amar Swargo	Srabon		
2007	Danob Sontan	Danob		
2007	Kothin Prem	Durjoy Chowdhury		
2007	Kabin Nama	Raja		
2007	Ek Buk Jwala	Noyon Chowdhury		
2008	Rajdhanir Raja	Raja		
2008	Tip Tip Brishti	Anik		
2008	Bhalobashar Dushmon	Akash Chowdhury		
2008	Sontan Amar Ohongkar	Shimul		
2008	Tumi Swapno Tumi Sadhona	Noyon		
2008	Biyer Prostab	Badhon / Chhoto Khan (Note: Khan played dual role in the film)		
2008	Priya Amar Priya	Hridoy	Won — Meril-Prothom Alo Awards for Best Actor	
2008	Ek Takar Bou	Raj Chowdhury		
2008	Hridoy Amar Naam	Hridoy		
2008	Amader Choto Shaheb	Riyan		
2008	Jodi Bou Sajogo	Abir		
2008	Mone Prane Acho Tumi	Joy		
2008	Tumi Amar Prem	Agun		
2008	Amar Jaan Amar Pran	Asif		
2008	Tomake Bou Banabo	Surjo		
2008	Somadhi	Manik		
2009	Mia Barir Chakor	Sumon		
2009	Jonmo Tomar Jonno	Manik		
2009	Bolbo Kotha Bashor Ghore	Iqbal / IK	Nominated — Meril-Prothom Alo Awards for Best Actor	
2009	Biye Bari	Reshad Mirza		
2009	Prem Koyedi	Badsha		
2009	Mon Jekhane Hridoy Sekhane	Akash		
2009	Swami Stirir Wadah	Joy / Hridoy		
2009	Jaan Amar Jaan	Hridoy		
2009	Mayer Haate Beheshter Chabi	ACP Biplob Chowdhury		
2009	Bolona Kobul	Jibon		
2009	Shaheb Name Golam	Munna / Shaheb		
2009	O Sathi Re	Raj		
2009	Bhalobashar Laal Golap	Rajonno / Dr. Ricky Ibrahim		
2009	Sobar Upore Tumi	Rahul	Indo-Bangladesh joint production	
2009	Amar Praner Priya	Prem Chowdhury	Nominated — Meril-Prothom Alo Awards for Best Actor	
2009	Mone Boro Koshto	Songram Chowdhury		
2009	Bhalobasha Dibi Kina Bol	Badsha		
2010	Takar Cheye Prem Boro	Raihan Chowdhury Sourav		
2010	Preme Porechi	Ashik / Akash		
2010	Jibon Moroner Sathi	Shafayat Rahman Abir		
2010	Amar Buker Moddhikhane	Rahul / Rajib		
2010	Jonom Jonomer Prem	Sobuj		
2010	Tumi Amar Moner Manush	Sagor		
2010	Bhalobaslei Ghor Bandha Jay Na	Surjo Khan	Won — Bangladesh National Film Award for Best Actor; Won — Meril-Prothom Alo Awards for Best Actor	
2010	Bhaolobeshe Morte Pari	Hridoy		
2010	Chehara: Vondo 2	Akash Chowdhury		
2010	Premik Purush	Raj		
2010	Number One Shakib Khan	Shakib Khan / Ali		
2010	Nissash Amar Tumi	Hridoy		
2010	Chachchu Amar Chachchu	Rafat Mallick		
2010	Top Hero	Haroon / Hero		
2010	Bolona Tumi Amar	Shah Mohammad Sagor Chowdhury		
2010	Poran Jai Jolia Re	Rabin Khan		
2010	Hay Prem Hay Bhalobasha	Robi Rahman		
2010	Prem Mane Na Badha	Sagor		
2011	Moner Jala	Chand / Rasel	Debut as a playback singer	
2011	Ontore Acho Tumi	Porag		
2011	Matir Thikana	Kallol		
2011	Koti Takar Prem	Jibon		
2011	Tor Karone Beche Achi	Akash		
2011	Ekbar Bolo Bhalobashi	Agun		
2011	Tiger Number One	Tiger / Shanto		
2011	Jaan Kurbaan	Jibon Rahman		
2011	Moner Ghore Boshot Kore	Shanto / Agun / Krishna (Note: Khan played one character with three deferent names in the film)		
2011	Priya Amar Jaan	Noman Chowdhury		
2011	King Khan	Rakesh / King Khan	Won — Meril-Prothom Alo Awards for Best Actor	
2011	Boss Number One	Hridoy Khan		
2011	Ke Apon Ke Por	Himself	Special appearance	
2011	Adorer Jamai	Mohammad Sajedur Rahman Saju	Nominated — Meril-Prothom Alo Critics Choice Award for Best Actor	
2012	I Love You	Akash		
2012	Amar Challenge	Biplob		
2012	Ek Takar Denmohor	Shaan Talukder		
2012	Ek Mon Ek Pran	Asaduzzaman Munna		
2012	Sontaner Moto Sontan	Raju / Akash		
2012	Khodar Pore Ma	Munna / Sidr	Won — Bangladesh National Film Award for Best Actor	
2012	My Name Is Sultan	Abir / Sultan		
2012	Dhakar King	Ali aka Dhakar King		
2012	Se Amar Mon Kereche	Aryan		
2012	Durdhorsho Premik	Munna		
2012	Ziddi Mama	Agun		
2012	100% Love: Buk Fatey To Mukh Foteyna	Rimaan Khan / RAM		
2012	Don Number One	Raja / King / Don	Won — Meril-Prothom Alo Awards for Best Actor	
2013	Jor Kore Bhalobasha Hoy Na	Saniat Ahmed Robi / Surjo		
2013	Devdas	Devdas Mukherjee		
2013	Judge Barrister Police Commissioner	Victor		
2013	Nishpap Munna	Munna / Toofan		
2013	My Name Is Khan	Sagor Khan		
2013	Bhalobasha Aaj Kal	Rana		
2013	Dhaka to Bombay	Billu		
2013	Full and Final	Romeo		
2013	Purno Doirgho Prem Kahini	Joy Shikder	200th film; Won— Meril-Prothom Alo Awards for Best Actor	
2013	Premik Number One	Tibro / Rasel		
2014	Lattu Koshai	Rakib		
2014	Rajotto	Samraat		
2014	Dobir Saheber Songsar	Himself	Special appearance	
2014	Daring Lover	Raja Rahman		
2014	Bhalobasha Express	Turjo Khan		
2014	Faand: The Trap	Asif		
2014	Hero: The Superstar	Hero Chowdhury / Hira Chowdhury	Also producer; Won— Meril-Prothom Alo Awards for Best Actor	
2014	Hitman	Rana		
2014	Kothin Protishodh	Badhon Chowdhury		
2014	Shera Nayok	Bijoy		
2014	Ek Cup Cha	Himself	Special appearance	
2015	Eito Prem	Surjo	Nominated — Meril-Prothom Alo Award for Best Film Actor	
2015	Dui Prithibi	Tanmoy		
2015	Love Marriage	Naya Sawdagor / Noyon		
2015	Aro Bhalobashbo Tomay	Shakib Khan (Note: Khan played his real life character with his real name in the film)	Won — Bangladesh National Film Award for Best Actor	
2015	Rajababu - The Power	Rajababu		
2016	Raja 420	Raja		
2016	Purno Doirgho Prem Kahini 2	Asad Ahmed / A2		
2016	Shikari	Raghob Chowdhury aka Raghu / Sultan / Hridoyharan aka Hridoy	Indo-Bangladesh joint production; Won— Meril-Prothom Alo Awards for Best Actor	
2016	Samraat: The King Is Here	Samraat		
2016	Mental	Shahriar Tanvir Rana		
2016	Bossgiri	Aryan Khan Lucky / Boss		
2016	Shooter	Surjo		
2016	Dhumketu	Shawon		
2017	Swatta	Sobuj	Won — Bangladesh National Film Award for Best Actor	
2017	Rajneeti	Ayon Habibullah	Nominated — Meril-Prothom Alo Awards for Best Actor	
2017	Nabab	Rajib Chowdhury / Nabab	Indo-Bangladesh joint production; Nominated — Meril-Prothom Alo Awards for Best Actor	
2017	Rangbaaz	Sallu Rangbaaz		
2017	Ohongkar	Mahim		
2018	Ami Neta Hobo	Shakib Khan Sakku		
2018	Chalbaaz	Raja Chowdhury	Indian film	
2018	Chittagainga Powa Noakhailla Maiya	Anjam		
2018	Panku Jamai	Akash Chowdhury		
2018	Super Hero	Iqbal Mahmud Sami	Nominated — Meril-Prothom Alo Awards for Best Actor	
2018	Bhaijaan Elo Re	Azan / Ujaan	Indian film	
2018	Captain Khan	Captain Khan / Asif Khan (Note: Khan played two character with two name)		
2018	Naqaab	Mass / Indrajit Chatterjee	Indian film	
2019	Password	Rudro	Also producer; Nominated — Meril-Prothom Alo Awards for Best Actor	
2019	Nolok	Shawon Talukder		
2019	Moner Moto Manush Pailam Naa	Swadhin		
2020	Bir	Antu / Bir	Also producer	
2020	Shahenshah	Shahenshah		
2020	Nabab LLB (Note: The film is placed in the 2020 section, although the first phrase of the film was released on December 16, 2020 and the second phrase was released on January 1, 2021.)	Nabab Chowdhury	Nominated — Meril-Prothom Alo Awards for Best Actor	
2022	Bidrohi	Mirza Nafis Iqbal Surjo		
2022	Golui	Lalu	Nominated — Meril-Prothom Alo Awards for Best Actor	
2023	Leader: Amie Bangladesh	Nafees Iqbal		
2023	Priyotoma	Sumon	Nominated — Meril-Prothom Alo Awards for Best Actor	
2024	Rajkumar	Shamsul "Sam" Haque / Rajkumar		
2024	Toofan	Galib Bin Goni "Toofan" / Shanto	250th film Won – Meril-Prothom Alo Awards for Best Actor	
2024	Dard	Dulal "Dulu" Miah	Indo-Bangladesh joint production	
2025	Borbaad	Ariyan Mirza		
2025	Antaratma	Prothom		
2025	Taandob	Mikhail / Swadhin		
2026	Prince: Once Upon a Time in Dhaka	Ibrahim		
2026	Rakkhosh	Ariyan Mirza	Archive footage from Borbaad	
2026	Rockstar	Rockstar Agun		
2026	Soldier †	TBA	Post-production	
2027	Nissho †	TBA	Filming	
2027	Mohabbat †	TBA	Filming	

== Other credits ==
=== As producer ===
Year	Film	Director	Notes	Ref
2014	Hero: The Superstar	Badiul Alam Khokon	Debut as a producer	
2019	Password	Malek Afsari		
2020	Bir	Kazi Hayat		

=== As singer ===
Year	Film	Title	Composer	Co-artist	Label	Ref
2011	Moner Jala	"Ami Chokh Tule Takalei"	Ali Akram Shuvo	Rashed	Anupam Recording Media	
2013	Purno Doirgho Prem Kahini	"O Priyo Ami Tomar Hote Chai"	Shawkat Ali Emon	Dinat Jahan Munni and Tousif	Laser Vision	

== Television appearances ==
Year	Title	Channel	Featured Promotion	Appears	Ref
2009	Amar Ami		Eid special	Guest	
2010	Nakkhatra Jugal		Eid special talkshow	Guest	
2011	Hot Sit With King Khan Shakib Khan	Ekushey TV	ETV special show	Guest	
2011	Ke Hotey Chay Kotipoti	Desh TV	Eid special	Guest (with Apu Biswas)	
2011	Priyo Joti		Eid special	Guest	
2011	Tin Tarar Golpo		Eid special	Guest	
2012	Amader Devdas		Eid special	Guest	
2012	Superstar		Eid special	Guest	
2012	Star Night With Shakib Khan	Maasranga Television	Eid special	Guest	
2013	Shudhui Adda	Boishakhi TV	Eid special	Guest	
2013	PHP Quraner Alo	NTV	Final	Guest (with Atiqul Islam, Mayor of DNCC)	
2014	Shakib Khan O Tar Nayikara	Banglavision	Promoting for Hero: The Superstar	Guest (with Apu Biswas and Bobby)	
2015	Chemistry	Maasranga TV	Eid special	Guest (with Apu Biswas)	
2015	Chemistry	Maasranga TV	Eid special	Guest (with Jaya Ahsan)	
2016	Shakib Vs Sakib	Ekushey TV	Eid special	Guest (with Shakib Al Hasan, Bangladesh national cricketer)	
2016	Asian Celebrity Lounge	Asian TV	Episode 03	Guest (with Moushumi and Omar Sani couple)	
2017	Eid With Movie Star	Asian TV	Promoting of Rangbaaz and Ohongkar	Guest	
2017	Ebong Shakib Khan	RTV	Promoting of Rangbaaz and Ohongkar	Guest (with Bubly)	
2018	Anandamoy Dine Shakib Khan Er Sathe	Banglavision	Eid special program	Guest (with Bubly)	
2018	Number One Shakib Khan	Ekattor TV	Joyotu	Guest	
2018	Celebrity Cafe	Asian TV	Promoting of Captain Khan	Guest (with Bubly)	
2019	Ajker Bangladesh	Independent TV	Promoting of Password	Guest (with Emon and Misha Sawdagor)	
2019	To The Point	Channel i	Promoting of Password	Guest (with Emon and Misha Sawdagor)	

== Unreleased project ==
The following is a list of unreleased films featuring Shakib Khan in a proper chronological order. During his long career, Khan has worked on a number of films which never released.

Year	Films	Roles	Director	Notes	Ref
2004	Opomaner Jala	As a Police officer	Noor Hossain Balai	Khan credited as a Police official. The film's release was postponed indefinitely due to director Noor Hossain Balai died.	
2008	Swapner Bidesh	Not credited	Nazrul Islam Khan	Last film of Khan-Shabnur's as duo. Not release due to 15 percent of filming incomplete.	
2014	My Darling		Montazur Rahman Akbar	Unreleased due to 30 percent of work incomplete	
2017	Operation Agneepath	Shehzad Khan Rana	Ashiqur Rahman	Unreleased due to post-production incomplete	
2019	Agun	Agun	Badiul Alam Khokon	Following the film's producer Enamul Haque Arman was arrested for his alleged involvement in the 2019 Casino Scam in Bangladesh, the film's release was shelved indefinitely.	
2023	Nil Doriya	Not created	Badiul Alam Khokon	Khan was paid-up with the remuneration 40 lakh, but later dropped the film due to poor screenplay	

== See also ==
- List of awards and nominations received by Shakib Khan
- List of highest-grossing Bangladeshi films
