= Ziddi Mama =

- YouTube version poster
- Directed by: Shahadat Hossain Liton
- Screenplay by: Shahadat Hossain Liton
- Story by: Abdullah Zahir Babu
- Starring: Shakib Khan; Apu Biswas; Rumana Khan; Misha Sawdagor
- Production company: Chitrali Kothachitro
- Distributed by: Chitrali Kothachitro
- Release date: 27 October 2012
- Running time: 129 minutes
- Country: Bangladesh
- Language: Bengali

Ziddi Mama (Note: Bengali: জিদ্দি মামা; transl. Stubborn Uncle) is a 2012 Bangladeshi film directed by Shahadat Hossain Liton and produced and distributed by Chitrali Kothachitro. The story of the film revolves around Agun (played by Shakib Khan) taking revenge, after the murder of his niece. It features an ensemble cast including Apu Biswas, Rumana Khan, Misha Sawdagor, Sadek Bachchu, Kabila, Siraj Haider and Rehana Jolly.

== Premise ==
When Agun's niece is killed by arms dealers, he becomes desperate for revenge.

== Cast ==
- Shakib Khan as Agun
- Apu Biswas as Nilima
- Rumana Khan as Roseline
- Misha Sawdagor as Aslam
- Sadek Bachchu as Jafar
- Kabila as Abul
- Siraj Haider
- Rehana Jolly
- Sanko Panja
- Boby

== Production ==
The working title was Vulbo Naa Tomake. In September 2012, the film received clearance from the Bangladesh Film Censor Board.

== Soundtrack ==
Ziddi Mama

Soundtrack album by Ali Akram Shuvo
- Genre: Feature Film Soundtrack
- Length: 19:30
- Language: Bengali
- Label: Eagle Music
- Producer: Ali Akram Shuvo

Ali Akram Shuvo chronology
Don Number One (2012)	Ziddi Mama (2012)	Full And Final (2013)
External videos
- Video Jukebox on YouTube

The film is composed by Ali Akram Shuvo and all the songs are penned by Kabir Bakul.

Track listing
No.	Title	Singer(s)	Length
1.	"Tumi Je Amar Shadhona"	Andrew Kishore, Ankhi Alamgir	4:41
2.	"Dhum Pachika Dhum Pachika"	S.I. Tutul	3:41
3.	"Duti Mone Futechilo Biyer Ful"	Andrew Kishore, Tanjina Ruma	3:37
4.	"Ei Paglu Paglu Mon"	S.I. Tutul, Tanjina Ruma	4:09
5.	"O Mama Mama Tumi"	Kanak Chapa, Monir Khan	3:22
Total length:			19:30

== Release ==
The film was released in cinemas on October 27, 2012, on the occasion of Eid al-Adha. It did not do the expected business at the box office.
