= Poran Jai Jolia Re =

- Movie poster
- Directed by: Sohanur Rahman Sohan
- Screenplay by: Sohanur Rahman Sohan; Dialogue Chatku Ahmed
- Story by: Anonno Mamun
- Produced by: Shafiqul Islam
- Starring: Shakib Khan; Dilara Hanif Purnima; Rumana Khan; Misha Sawdagor
- Cinematography: Asaduzzaman Mojnu
- Edited by: Mohammad Ekramul Haque
- Music by: Shawkat Ali Emon
- Production company: Bandhan Banichitra
- Distributed by: Bandhan Banichitra
- Release date: 19 November 2010
- Running time: 141 minutes (YouTube version)
- Country: Bangladesh
- Language: Bengali

Poran Jai Jolia Re (Note: Bengali: পরাণ যায় জ্বলিয়া রে; transl. Heart is Set on Fire) is a 2010 Bangladeshi romance film. The film is directed by Sohanur Rahman Sohan and produced by Shafiqul Islam under the banner of Bandhan Banichitra. Its story is written by Anonno Mamun, screenplay by Sohanur Rahman Sohan himself and dialogues by prominent director Chatku Ahmed. The film stars Bangladeshi superstar Shakib Khan, Dilara Hanif Purnima, Rumana Khan, ATM Shamsuzzaman and Misha Sawdagor. It was a commercial success at the box office and became a superhit.

== Plot ==
Rabin Khan (Shakib Khan), the only grandson of Khan Abdul Ghaffar Khan (ATM Shamsuzzaman), the richest man in the city, falls in love with girls on bets with friends. Thus one day he made a bet with his friends and fell in love with a girl named Hashi. Hashi (Nasima Akter Nodi) tells Rabin Khan about her love, but Khan rejects her saying he doesn't love her. Hashi committed suicide as she could not tolerate the various words of the people of the society. Subsequently, one day Rabin Khan rescues Khushi (Dilara Hanif Purnima) and her friends when they are harassed by some goons in the park, he falls in love with Khushi at first sight. Several times after that Rabin Khan tries to convince Khushi of his love but Khushi rejects his love considering Khan as her sister's killer. Meanwhile, Jolie (Rumana Khan) falls in love with Rabin Khan, the only sister of the city's biggest gangster, Hitler (Misha Sawdagor). But Khan loves Khushi, so he rejects Jolie's love. Julie wants Khan at any cost. Meanwhile, Rabin Khan fell ill without getting Khushi's love, later he recovered from his illness and went to Khushi's house. He took Khushi's hand and in a tug-of-war, some rowdy boys of the neighborhood beat up Khan. Khushi goes home from there, later her mother (Rehana Jolly) convinces her that Khan is not her sister's killer. Hashi wanted to live after being rejected by Khan, but could not tolerate the various words of the people of the society and later committed suicide. Realizing her mistake, Khushi accepts Khan's love.

== Cast ==
- Shakib Khan as Rabin Khan, the only grandson of Khan Abdul Ghaffar Khan, the richest man in the city; Who falls in love with girls on bets with friends.
- Dilara Hanif Purnima as Khushi, Rabin Khan's love interest; Hashi's younger sister
- Rumana Khan as Jolie, the only sister of the city's biggest gangster, Hitler
- Nasima Akter Nodi as Hashi, Khushi's elder sister; Rabin Khan rejects her love
- ATM Shamsuzzaman as Khan Abdul Ghaffar Khan, grandfather of Rabin Khan, the richest man of the city
- Rehana Jolly as Hashi and Khushi's mother
- Afzal Sharif as Chan, Rabin Khan's office assistant and friend
- Misha Sawdagor as Hitlar, city's biggest gangster
- Don as Hitlar's younger brother
- Nagma as Hitler's gang
- Rashed Chowdhury
- Siraj Haider as Police official
- DJ Shohel as Hitlar's brother
- Zamilur Rahman Shakha

== Soundtrack ==
Poran Jai Jolia Re

Soundtrack album by Shouquat Ali Imon
- Released: 2010
- Recorded: 2010
- Studio: Bandhan Kothachitro
- Genre: Feature Film Soundtrack
- Length: 27:57
- Language: Bengali
- Label: Anupam Recording Media
- Producer: Shouquat Ali Imon

Shouquat Ali Imon chronology
Chachchu Amar Chachchu (2010)	Poran Jai Jolia Re (2010)	Koti Takar Kabin (2011)

Singles from Poran Jai Jolia Re

The soundtrack album of the film is arranged by Shouquat Ali Imon. The song is also composed by himself, with lyrics penned by Kabir Bakul and Indian musician Shaan has sung two songs including its title track, "Amar Poran Jai Jolia Re" and the other is "Tumi Acho Bole Ami Achi".

All tracks are written by Kabir Bakul.

Track listing
No.	Title	Singer(s)	Length
1.	"Amar Poran Jai Jolia Re"	Saymon, Mimi Naznin	5:10
2.	"Khub Chena Chena"	Rupam	3:46
3.	"Ichche Boro Ichche"	S.I. Tutul, Dolly Sayontoni	4:02
4.	"Ek Mutho Prithibi Te"	S.I. Tutul, Samina Chowdhury	4:11
5.	"Tumi Acho Tumi Nei"	Shaan, Manisha	3:31
6.	"Ore Panjabiwala"	Monir Khan, Rizia Parveen	5:01
Total length:			27:54

== Release ==
The film was released on 19 November 2010 along with six other films on occasion of Eid al-Adha.

== Awards and nominations ==
=== Meril-Prothom Alo Awards ===
Meril-Prothom Alo Award for Best Film Actress

Nominated — Dilara Hanif Purnima
