= Priya Amar Priya =

- The film CD cover
- Directed by: Badiul Alam Khokon
- Written by: Sachin Kumar Nag (dialogue)
- Screenplay by: Puri Jagannadh
- Story by: Puri Jagannadh
- Produced by: Monir Hossain
- Starring: Shakib Khan; Sahara; Prabir Mitra; Misha Sawdagor
- Music by: Ali Akram Shuvo
- Production company: Asha Production
- Distributed by: Asha Production
- Release date: 13 June 2008
- Running time: 132 minutes
- Country: Bangladesh
- Language: Bengali
- Budget: ৳50 lakh (equivalent to ৳1.5 crore or US$120,000 in 2024) (excluding print costs) (Note: However, the director Badiul Alam Khokon mentioned in an interview with Channel i that the budget is ৳1 crore (equivalent to ৳3.0 crore or US$240,000 in 2024).)
- Box office: est. ৳15 crore (equivalent to ৳45 crore or US$3.7 million in 2024)

Priya Amar Priya (Bengali: প্রিয়া আমার প্রিয়া; transl. My Beloved Dear) is a 2008 Bangladeshi romantic-action film. The film was directed by Badiul Alam Khokon and produced by Monir Hossain under the banner of Asha Production. The film is a remake of the 2002 Kannada-language film Appu, which was later remade in Telugu as Idiot (2002), in Tamil as Dum (2003) and in Bengali as Hero (2006). It was the second Kannada film which are remade in Bangladeshi Bengali after M. S. Rajashekar's Anuraga Aralithu starring Dr. Rajkumar, Madhavi and Geetha.

The film revolve around a careless college student Hridoy (played by Shakib Khan) who fall in love with city's commissioner sister Priya (played by Sahara). Things take a turn when he begins to have feelings for her. Misha Sawdagor, Prabir Mitra, Rehana Jolly and Afzal Sharif played supporting roles in the film.

The film was released in Bangladesh on 13 June 2008. Shakib Khan won Meril-Prothom Alo Awards for Best Actor, Euro-CJFB Performance Awards and Channel I Performance Awards for his performance in the film. Priya Amar Priya has set several box office records. It is the highest grossing Bangladeshi film of 2008 and also one of the highest grossing Bangladeshi films of all-time. And also the highest grossing film of Khan's career until it was surpassed by Khan's 2023 all-time blockbuster Priyotoma. After the release of the film, Khan gained widespread fame shortly and gained a large number of fan following.

== Plot ==
Hridoy (Shakib Khan) is the son of a police head constable Rahmat Ali. Hridoy is a guy with a careless attitude. He is beaten by a rival gang at night and was rescued by a beautiful girl Priya Chowdhury (Sahara). She pays his hospital bills and donates her blood. She is gone from the hospital by the time Hridoy becomes conscious. When Hridoy's friends inform him about the girl who rescued him, he starts loving her immediately for her good-heartedness, though he did not see her. Priya later turns out to be the sister of the city police commissioner Rashed Rayhan Chowdhury (Misha Showdagor).

Hridoy meets Priya in the college for the first time and expresses his love. When she does not agree, he tries to tease her. She complains to her brother, and he takes Hridoy to the police station and severely beats him before being rescued by his father and his fellow constables. Even though Hridoy is beaten by Rashed Rayhan Chowdhury, he becomes more adamant to win his ladylove. He proposes to Priya again in the college. She asks him to jump from the building. When he is ready to do so, she agrees to his love.

However, Rashed Rayhan Chowdhury is not happy about their relationship and ropes in some rowdies to amputate his leg. Priya learns about this and runs to help him, but is met with an accident. Both of them get admitted to the same hospital, and they unite there also. Rashed Rayhan Chowdhury finally arranges her marriage with another person, to which she openly opposes and tries to commit suicide. Priya comes and rescues her, but Rashed Rayhan Chowdhury still wants to get her married to a man of his own choice. He also engages goons to kill Hridoy. Priya finally escapes all the troubles and meets the Bangladesh Police IG to help him to marry his love. The IG finally suspends Rashed Rayhan Chowdhury and arranges Hridoy's marriage in the police station. Finally, Hridoy appears for Bangladesh Civil Service and is selected for Bangladesh Police.

== Cast ==
- Shakib Khan as Hridoy, a college student with careless attitude; Later he fall in love with city's commissioner sister Priya
- Sahara as Priya Chowdhury, sister of city's police commissioner Rashed Rayhan Chowdhury; who later fall in love with Hridoy
- Misha Sawdagor as Rashed Rayhan Chowdhury, police commissioner, Priya's brother
- Prabir Mitra as Rahmat Ali, police constable, Hridoy's father
- Rehana Jolly as Hridoy's mother
- Mehedi as Asif, one of Hridoy's friend
- Madhuri as Lata, Hridoy's sister
- Afzal Sharif as Babu, one of Hridoy's friend
- Faiyaz Ahmed Boby as one of city's constable; who worked with Hridoy's father
- Ilias Kobra as Commissioner's goon
- Siraj Haider as IG, Bangladesh Police (special appearance)

== Production ==
The protagonist Shakib Khan took a salary ৳1.5 lakhs for his role in the film. He signed a contract with Asha Productions with signing money only ৳25,000 on 14 February 2006.

Its filming began on 25 December 2006 and The film was shots with a few lots. The film was completed in late 2007.

== Soundtrack ==
Priya Amar Priya

Soundtrack album by Ali Akram Shuvo
- Released: 13 June 2008
- Studio: Anupam Recording Media
- Genre: Feature Film Soundtrack
- Length: 21:40
- Language: Bengali
- Label: Anupam Recording Media
- Producer: Ali Akram Shuvo

Ali Akram Shuvo chronology
Tumi Swapno Tumi Shadhona (2008)	Priya Amar Priya (2008)	Amar Jaan Amar Pran (2008)
External audio
- Official Audio Jukebox on YouTube

The film soundtrack is composed by Ali Akram Shuvo and all the song written by Kabir Bakul. A total of five songs have been used in the film.

Track list
No.	Title	Singer(s)	Length
1.	"Nishash Amar Tumi" (This song largely inspired from Tamil song Manase Manase from 2003 film Dum)	S I Tutul	4:32
2.	"Chupi Chupi Kotha"	Syed Abdul Hadi, Sabina Yasmin	4:31
3.	"First Year Damn Care" (This song largely inspired from Tamil song Kalakuven Kalakuven from 2003 film Dum)	Asif Akbar	3:48
4.	"Ami Je Tomari Premete Porechi" (This song largely inspired from Tamil song Chanakya Chanakya from 2003 film Dum)	Sabina Yasmin	4:26
5.	"Tumay Chara Beche Thaka"	Sabina Yasmin, Andrew Kishore	4:23
Total length:			21:40

== Release ==
The release on 13 June 2008 in 33 theatre in all around the country.

== Reception ==
The film became one of blockbuster hit among Bangladeshi films released in 2008, breaking all box office records at the time. The film was making with a budget ৳50 lakh (US$41,000). The film grossed ৳15 crore (US$1.2 million) at the box office, making it the second highest grossing Bangladeshi film.

=== Awards ===
Awards	Nominee	Category	Results	ref
Meril-Prothom Alo Awards	Shakib Khan	Best Actor	Won	
Euro-CJFB Performance Awards	Shakib Khan	Best Actor	Won	
Lux Channel i Performance Awards	Shakib Khan	Best Actor	Won	

== Legacy ==
One of Khan's dialogue and the use of the phrase "সিটিতে অনেক কমিশনার আসবে যাবে কিন্তু হৃদয় এখানেই থাকবে। আমি এখানকার লোকাল... লো..ক্কাল।" (Many commissioners will come and go in the city but Hridoy will stay here. I'm local here... lo..ccal) were popular with audiences. After the release of the film, Khan gained widespread fame shortly. Not only that, Sahara also became an overnight star by acting opposite Khan. Also Shakib Khan's remuneration increased to 20 times.
