= Jor Kore Bhalobasha Hoy Na =

2013 film by Shahadat Hossain Liton

- Theatrical release poster
- Directed by: Shahadat Hossain Liton
- Story by: Abdullah Zahir Babu
- Produced by: Abdul Mabud Kawser
- Starring: Shakib Khan; Sahara; Ayesha Salma Mukti; Ali Raj; Misha Sawdagor
- Cinematography: M.A Kaiyum
- Edited by: Touhid Hossain Chowdhury
- Music by: Ali Akram Shuvo
- Production company: Tushar Kotha Chitra
- Distributed by: Tushar Kotha Chitra
- Release date: February 1, 2013
- Country: Bangladesh
- Language: Bengali

Jor Kore Bhalobasha Hoy Na is a 2013 Bangladeshi action thriller film. The film was directed by Shahadat Hossain Liton and produced by Abdul Mabud Kawser under the banner of Tushar Kotha Chitra. It featured Shakib Khan, Sahara and Ayesha Salma Mukti in lead roles. Misha Sawdagor, Sadek Bachchu, Ali Raj and others also played important roles in the film. It was the first digital film starring by Shakib Khan. It was a remake of 2002 Hindi film Tumko Na Bhool Paayenge.

== Story ==
Saniyat Ahmed Robi (Shakib Khan) is the only son of retired Major Mansur Ali Khan and Kajal (Sahara) is the daughter of retired Police Commissioner Ashraf Chowdhury. The duo love each other. When the two families become acquainted, they also accept this love and agree to their marriage. But a group of terrorists carries out a surprise attack on the wedding ceremony.

== Cast ==
- Shakib Khan as Saniyat Ahmed Robi aka Surja
- Sahara as Kajal
- Ayesha Salma Mukti as Shobha
- Saif Khan Pinu as Sagor
- Misha Sawdagor as Usman
- Sadek Bachchu as Aslam
- Ali Raj
- Rehana Jolly
- Bobby
- Jackie
- Subrata
- Kabila
- Afzal Sharif

== Release ==
The film released in almost 47 theatres on February 1, 2013.
