= O Priya Tumi Kothay (film) =

Bangladeshi romantic action film

- Movie poster
- Bengali: ও প্রিয়া তুমি কোথায়
- Directed by: Shahadat Hossain Liton
- Screenplay by: Shahadat Hossain Liton; Dialogue: Mohammad Rafiquzzaman
- Story by: Shahaidul Islam Shahid
- Produced by: Shahidul Islam Shahid
- Starring: Shakib Khan; Riaz; Shabnur
- Cinematography: Asaduzzaman Maznu
- Edited by: Jinnat Hossain
- Music by: Ali Akram Shuvo
- Production company: Abhinondon Cholochitro
- Distributed by: Abhinondon Cholochitro
- Release date: 7 December 2002
- Running time: 157 minutes (YouTube version)
- Country: Bangladesh
- Language: Bangla

O Priya Tumi Kothay (Bengali: ও প্রিয়া তুমি কোথায়; transl. Oh Dear, Where Are You) is a 2002 Bangladeshi romantic action film. The film was directed by Shahadat Hossain Liton and written and produced by Shahidul Islam Shahid under the banner of Abhinondon Cholochitro. It features Shakib Khan, Riaz, Shabnur in the lead roles. Also Misha Sawdagor, Wasimul Bari Rajib, Rehana Jolly and Afzal Sharif played supporting roles.

The film was named after a song of the same name sung by Asif Akbar. It got censor clarification on 16 September 2002 and was released on December 7, 2002. The film was shot mostly in Bangladesh Film Development Corporation. The music was composed by Ali Akram Shuvo, while title song composed by Ethun Babu, cinematography handled by Asaduzzaman Majnu, choreographed by Masum Babul, Imdadul Haque Khokon, Aziz Reza and Saiful Shahin and editing was by Jinnat Hossain. Riaz won Meril-Prothom Alo Award for Best Actor for the film.

== Synopsis ==
Kajal (Shabnur) and Sagar (Riaz) love each other a lot. Suddenly, one day, he introduced Kajal to his mother and his mother asked him to marry her. But before Kajal's father died, he promised his friend that his son would marry Kajal to Akash (Shakib Khan). Kajal is pressured by her father to marry Akash. A tragic situation is created at the conclusion of the story.

== Cast ==
- Shakib Khan as Akash
- Riaz as Sagor
- Shabnur as Kajol
- Wasimul Bari Rajib
- Misha Sawdagor
- Rehana Jolly
- Dolly Johur
- Nahida Ashraf Anna
- Afzal Sharif
- Kabila
- Nasreen

== Soundtrack ==
O Priya Tumi Kothay (Original Motion Picture Soundtrack)

Soundtrack album by Ali Akram Shuvo
- Released: 2002
- Recorded: 2002
- Genre: Feature Film Soundtrack
- Language: Bangla
- Label: Eagle Music
- Producer: Ali Akram Shuvo

Singles from O Priya Tumi Kothay
- 1. "O Priya Tumi Kothay" Released: 9 September 2018; 2. "Tomake Peye" Released: 4 September 2018; 3. "Mon Manena Amar Maner Hridoy" Released: 10 September 2018

The film soundtrack composed by Ali Akram Shuvo and Ethun Babu, while Kabir Bakul, Mohammad Rafiquzzaman and Mirza Rakib penned its lyrics. The film titled named after Asif Akbar's popular song "O Priya Tumi Kothay", which used in the film with exact tune and lyrics, Riaz lip synced to the song.

Track listing
No.	Title	Lyrics	Music	Singer(s)	Length
1.	"O Priya Tumi Kothay"	Ethun Babu	Ethun Babu	Asif Akbar	5:05
2.	"Tomake Peye Ami"	Kabir Bakul	Ali Akram Shuvo	Andrew Kishore and Sabina Yasmin	4:19
3.	"Mon Manena Re Amar"	Kabir Bakul	Ali Akram Shuvo	Andrew Kishore and Dolly Sayontoni	4:09
4.	"Eto Prem Chilo Tomar-e Buke "(This song copied from Pakistani Classic Punjabi song Boohey Barian') (Track) from Album Roshni)" By Hadiqa Kiani"	Mohammad Rafiquzzaman	Ali Akram Shuvo	Andrew Kishore and Kanak Chapa	4:02
5.	"Mukhta Jeno Futa Neet Padmaful"	Kabir Bakul	Ali Akram Shuvo	Monir Khan and Kanak Chapa	3:54
6.	"Gari Chalao Nishidin"	Mirza Rakib	Ali Akram Shuvo	Baby Naznin	3:58
Total length:					25:27

== Release ==
The film was got censor clarification by the Bangladesh Film Censor Board on 16 September 2002 and released theatrically the same year in 16 September and became a commercial success. Sixteen years after its theatrical release, the film was released on video sharing platform YouTube on 18 September 2018 under the banner of Eagle Movies.

== Accolades ==
Meril-Prothom Alo Awards

Year	Category	Nominee	Result	Ref
2002	Best Actor	Riaz	Won	
