= Ohongkar =

Bangladeshi drama film

- Film poster
- Directed by: Shahadat Hossain Liton
- Written by: Ajay Kumar
- Screenplay by: Abdullah Zahir Babu
- Produced by: Abdul Mabud Kausar
- Starring: Shakib Khan; Shabnom Bubly; Abul Hayat; Toma Mirza; Mizu Ahmed; Rehana Jolly; Afzal Sharif; Nuton; Sadiq Siddiqui
- Cinematography: Asaduzzaman Monju
- Edited by: Towhid Hossain Chowdhury
- Music by: Shawkat Ali Emon; Ahmed Imtiaz Bulbul; Ali Akram Shuvo; Aryan Ashik
- Production company: Tushar Kothachitro
- Distributed by: Bangladesh Film Development Corporation
- Release date: 2 September 2017
- Country: Bangladesh
- Language: Bengali

Ohongkar (transl. Arrogance) (Bengali: অহংকার) is a 2017 Bangladeshi drama film directed by Shahadat Hossain Liton. It was produced by Tushar Kothachitro. The film stars Shakib Khan and Shabnom Bubly in the lead roles. The supporting roles are played by Toma Mirza, Mizu Ahmed, Rehana Jolly, Afzal Sharif, and Nuton. The film was released on 2 September 2017 for the Eid-ul-Adha. The movie is a remake of 2005 Kannada film Auto Shankar.

== Cast ==
- Shakib Khan as Mahim
- Shabnom Bubly as Maya
- Nuton as Ammajan
- Toma Mirza as Taniya
- Mizu Ahmed
- Rehana Jolly as Mahim's mother
- Sadek Bachchu as Mahim's father
- Afzal Sharif
- Raju Sarkar
- Sadeq Siddiqui
- Md Jakir Hossain as Jakir

== Soundtrack ==
The film music album was composed by Shawkat Ali Emon, Ahmed Imtiaz Bulbul and Ali Akram Shuvo. The background score was produced by Emon Shaha. The lyrics were done by Ahmed Imtiaz Bulbul, Kabir Bakul and Sudip Kumar Dip. Live Technologies Ltd named the music rights of the film.

=== Track listing ===
No.	Title	Music	Singer(s)	Length
1.	"Tui Je Amar Ei Ontore"	Shawkat Ali Emon	Imran Mahmudul, Mimi	4:35
2.	"Ohongkar (Title Song)"	Ahmed Imtiaz Bulbul	S.I. Tutul	2:37
3.	"Buker Bhitor Rekhe Tomay"	Shawkat Ali Emon	Imran Mahmudul, Mimi	4:40
4.	"Tui Je Amar Super Hero"	Ahmed Imtiaz Bulbul	Imran Mahmudul, Lehat Lemis	5:16
