= My Name Is Khan (2013 film) =

- Theatrical release poster
- Directed by: Badiul Alam Khokon
- Written by: Kashem Ali Dulal
- Based on: Seema Tapakai by G. Nageswara Reddy
- Produced by: Ahmed Chowdhury Shaon; Rakin Anan Chowdhury
- Starring: Shakib Khan; Apu Biswas; Prabir Mitra
- Music by: Ali Akram Shuvo
- Production company: New Star Film Corporation
- Distributed by: Anan Entertainment & Picture
- Release date: 9 August 2013
- Country: Bangladesh
- Language: Bengali

My Name Is Khan (initialism as MNIK) is a Bangladeshi romantic action film directed by Badiul Alam Khokon. The film stars Shakib Khan, Apu Biswas, Prabir Mitra and Misha Sawdagor in the lead roles. It was released on Eid-ul-Fitr, 9 August 2013.

== Cast ==
- Shakib Khan as Sagor Khan
- Apu Biswas as Jhinuk Chowdhury
- Prabir Mitra as Suleman Khan, Grandfather of Sagor Khan
- Subrata as Sajjad Khan, Sagor Khan's father
- Olka Sarker as Sagor Khan's mother, wife of Sajjad Khan
- Rehana Jolly – herself
- Nuton as Sharmin Jahan Chowdhury, Mother of Jhinuk Chowdhury
- Sadek Bachchu – Jhinuk Chowdhury's Father
- Misha Sawdagor as Ramiz Raja
- Afzal Sharif
- Ilias Kobra
- Puja Cherry Roy as the child artist

== Music ==
The soundtrack of My Name Is Khan was composed by Ali Akram Shubho. The song "My Name Is Khan" was released as a promotional single on 21 July 2013, the video promo of the song "Jibon Amar" was released on 26 July 2013. and on 30 July 2013, the promo video of "Shokale Tomae Dekhi" was released.

Track listing
| No. | Title | Singer(s) | Length |
|---|---|---|---|
| 1. | "My Name Is Khan (This song copied from Telugu song Racha from movie Racha)" | S I Tutul | 3:48 |
| 2. | "Jibon Amar" | Asif, Doly Sayontoni | 5:50 |
| 3. | "Shokale Tomaye Dekhi (This song copied from Telugu song Vaastu Bagunde from movie Dammu)" | Doly Sayontoni, Palash | 3:50 |

== Production ==
The film was shot in Bangladesh and Thailand.
