= Käbin =

Family name

Käbin is an Estonian surname. Notable people with the surname include:

- Ilo Käbin (1921–2003), surgeon and medical scientist
- Johannes Käbin (Ivan Käbin, 1905–1999), Soviet Estonian politician
- Rait Käbin (born 1981), Estonian basketball coach and former professional basketball player
- Tiit Käbin (1937–2011), lawyer and politician

== See also ==
- Kabin
