= Sahara (actress) =

Bangladeshi film actress (born 1993)

- Born: 19 June 1990 (age 36); Dhaka, Bangladesh
- Years active: 2004–2014
- Known for: Priya Amar Priya
- Spouse: Mahbubur Rahman Manir (m. 2015)

Sahara (Bengali: সাহারা) is a Bangladeshi film actress. She made her debut in the film Rukhe Darao in 2004 with Shakib Khan. Her career lasted from then to 2014, the year her last movie was released. She stopped acting after marrying Mahbubur Rahman in 2015.

== Career ==
Shahara started her career in 2004 with the film Rukhe Darao. In 2008, she starred in the blockbuster Priya Amar Priya with Shakib Khan.

== Filmography ==
Year	Film	Role	Director	Notes	Ref.
2004	Rukhe Darao	Kajal	Shahadat Hossain Liton	Debut film	
2004	Varate Khuni	Shumi	Shahadat Hossain Liton		
2004	Dhor Shaitan	Dola	Badiul Alam Khokon		
2004	Tin Badshah	Inspector Hena/Kona (Note: Sahara played a single character with two or more names in the film)	Aziz Ahmed Babul		
2005	Bishakto Chokh: The Blue Eye	Rosy	Masum Parvez Rubel		
2005	Mastan Number One	Kajol	Shahadat Hossain Liton		
2005	Lalu Koshai	Kajal	Shahadat Hossain Liton		
2005	Damn Care	Nadira	Syed Shamsul Alam		
2005	Order	Diba	Raju Chowdhury		
2005	Lucky 7	Kajol	Shahadat Hossain Liton		
2005	Sagorer Gorjon	Moumita	Abu Saeed Khan		
2005	Domon	Shikha	Sheikh Nazrul Islam		
2006	Jadrel	Rani	M B Manik		
2006	Josnar Prem	Josna	Sheikh Nazrul Islam		
2006	Nosto Chhatro	Kajol	Shahadat Hossain Liton		
2006	Khomota	Kajol	M.B. Manik		
2007	Ghore Dushmon	Bubli	M.M Sarkar		
2007	Dusto Meye	Lona	M.O Rahim		
2007	Shanto Keno Oshanto	Kakon	Mohammad Salahuddin and Ahmed Ali		
2007	Banglar Don	Shanta	Mostafizur Rahman Babu		
2007	Moydaan	Rupa Khan	Polli Malek		
2007	Astrodhari Rana	Farzana	Nilu Shimul		
2007	Chokkor	Roja and Rumana (Note: Sahara played two roles)	Md. Firoz Alam		
2008	Amader Choto Shaheb	Tisha	F I Manik		
2008	Priya Amar Priya	Priya	Badiul Alam Khokon		
2009	Kajer Maanush	Ginia	Montazur Rahman Akbar		
2009	Mon Diyechi Tomake	Nila	Nayak Raj Razzak		
2009	Bhalobashar Shesh Nai	Bijli	Reza Lotif		
2009	Bhalobeshe Bou Anbo	Raina	Chondon Chowdhury		
2009	Aainer Hate Greftar	Nupur	Rashed Alam Rana		
2009	Ovishopto Raat	Tamanna	Apurba Rana		
2009	Vondo Nayok	Kajol	Shahadat Hossain Liton		
2009	Shaheb Name Golam	Roja	Raju Chowdhury		
2009	Prem Koyedi	Nilima	M B Manik		
2009	Bolbo Kotha Bashor Ghore	Kajal	Shah Mohammad Songram		
2009	Rastar Chele	Maati	Shaheen-Sumon		
2010	Bhalobeshe Morte Pari	Shima	Badiul Alam Khokon		
2010	Ashanto Mon	Papri	Kazi Hayat		
2010	Bostir Chele Kotipoti	Bindu	Swapon Chowdhury		
2010	Panch Takar Prem	Priya/Nusrat (Note: Sahara played a single character with two or more names in the film)	Shaheen Sumon		
2010	Amar Swapno	Shahara	Kazi Hayat		
2010	Boroloker Dosh Din Goriber Ek Din	Brishti	Sheikh Nazrul Islam		
2010	Mayer Jonno Morte Pari	Mohona	Ahmed Nasir		
2011	Darowaner Chele	Dithi	Rakibul Alam Rakib		
2011	Amar Prithibi Tumi	Kajal	Gazi Mahbub		
2011	Sathi Hara Nagin	Nagrani Mohini	Delwar Jahan Jhantu		
2011	Bondhu Tumi Shotru Tumi	Nila	Royal Babu		
2011	Tiger Number One	Shopna	Shaheen Sumon		
2011	Boss Number One	Aalo Chowdhury	Mohammad Hossain Jemi / Badiul Alam Khokon		
2011	Ek Takar Chele Koti Takar Meye	Champa	Komol Sarkar		
2011	Ongko	Rumki	Shaheen Sumon		
2011	Pita Putrer Golpo	Ratna	Kazi Hayat		
2012	Khodar Pore Ma	Labena	Shaheen Sumon		
2012	Sontaner Moto Sontan	Lalita	Shaheen Sumon		
2012	Amar Challenge	Nila	Badiul Alam Khokon		
2012	My Name Is Sultan	Kajal	F I Manik		
2012	Maruf Er Challenge	Kajol	Shahadat Hossain Liton		
2012	Don Number One	Lalitaa	Badiul Alam Khokon		
2013	Dhaka to Bombay	Payel	M B Manik		
2013	Jor Kore Bhalobasha Hoy Na	Kajal	Shahadat Hossain Liton		
2013	Nishpap Munna	Antora	Badiul Alam Khokon		
2014	Toke Bhalobashtei Hobe	Kajal	Raju Chowdhury		
