= Dhaka to Bombay =

2013 action drama film

- Movie poster
- Bengali: ঢাকা টু বোম্বে
- Directed by: Uttam Akash
- Written by: Uttam Akash
- Produced by: Mahmudur Rahman Monir
- Starring: Shakib Khan; Sahara; Sadek Bachchu; Kabila; Danny Sidak
- Cinematography: Mojibul Haque Bhuiyan
- Edited by: M.A. Rahim
- Music by: Bappy Raaj; Jibon Murad; Kazi Jamal
- Production company: Gudhuli Films
- Distributed by: Maa Kothachitro
- Release date: 13 September 2013
- Running time: 155 minutes
- Country: Bangladesh
- Language: Bengali

Dhaka to Bombay is a 2013 action drama film directed by Uttam Akash and produced by Mahmudur Rahman Monir under the banner of Gudhuli Films. Its features Shakib Khan and Sahara in the lead roles. It also features Omar Sani, Suchorita, Sadek Bachchu, Danny Sidak, Kabila, Nasreen in other roles.

== Plot ==
Billu (Shakib Khan) is sold as a teenager by human trafficker, Tajul (Sadek Bachchu), to another human trafficker, Agarwal, in Mumbai, India. Billu escapes from Agarwal's hideout. There he found refuge in a kind hearted person.

Meanwhile, Tajul threatens Billu's family in Dhaka, because Billu's younger sister is a journalist for a local newspaper there. Billu is now a young man of 25, he couldn't forget the human trafficker Agarwal. Dramatically, Billu gets an opportunity to work in Bollywood films in Mumbai. Payel (Sahara) is sold by her Bangladeshi lover to human trafficker Agarwal. Billu rescues Payal from Aggarwal's hideout and they start trusting each other. They crossed the border into Bangladesh and went to Badda, Dhaka, from where Billu was trafficked. Billu searches for Tajul everywhere. One day he finds Tajul. Billu's philanthropic work increased his popularity around city. Tajul plans to kill Billu considering him an election rival.

Meanwhile, Billu finds his family. Payal sees Billu with another girl, mistaking him, and goes back to her old boyfriend. Meanwhile, Billu finds his family. Seeing Billu with another girl, Payel misunderstands him and goes back to her old boyfriend, who sold her to human trafficker Agarwal. Billu kills everyone while Tajul and his forces escape by ship. Finally Payel realizes her mistake and returns to Billu. They again start their journey to Mumbai.

== Cast ==
- Shakib Khan as Billal a.k.a Billu, He was trafficked to India by child traffickers as a child.
- Sahara as Payel, she went to meet her boyfriend in India, who sold her to Indian traffickers
- Omar Sani as Billu's maternal uncle
- Suchorita as Billu's mother
- Sadek Bachchu as Tajul, main human trafficker
- Kabila as Kabila, he is Billu's friend and associate
- Nasreen as Kabila's love interest
- Danny Sidak as Danny, Human trafficker
- Danny Raaj
- Kabita as Kabita Sinha, Indian Bollywood model-actress

== Production ==
Most of the film was shot at various locations in Mumbai, India. In this regard, the director of the film Uttam Akash told Prothom Alo that "Most of the film was shot in various locations in Mumbai for the story demand. It is an expensive film." In January 2014, protagonist Shakib Khan told Prothom Alo in an interview that, 70 percent of the film's work was completed in Dhaka and the remaining work will be shot in Mumbai.

== Soundtrack ==
Dhaka to Bombay

Soundtrack album by Kazi Jamal, Bappiraj and Jibon Murad
- Released: 2013
- Studio: Maa Kothachitro
- Genre: Feature Film Soundtrack
- Length: 17:56
- Language: Bengali
- Label: G-Series
- Producer: Kazi Jamal, Bappiraj and Jibon Murad

Kazi Jamal, Bappiraj and Jibon Murad chronology
Dhaka to Bombay (2013)	Raja 420 (2016)

The film's soundtrack is composed by Kazi Jamal, Jibon Murad and Bappiraj, lyrics penned by Uttam Akash and Bappiraj. Its songs are sung by Dilshad Nahar Kona, Nirjhar, Jibon Murad, Bappiraj, Shahin and Anima de Costa.

Track listing
No.	Title	Lyrics	Music	Singer(s)	Length
1.	"Tore Chara Bachi Kemone"	Collected	Collected	Tanjina Ruma, Jalal	4:20
2.	"Bukee Bhitor Premer Pakhi"	Jibon Murad	Jibon Murad	Jibon Murad, Nirjhar	5:10
3.	"Chokhe Nesha"	Jibon Murad	Jibon Murad	Anima de Costa, Kishore, Joy Mahmud	4:17
4.	"Mumbai Jab Shaam Hota Hain"	Bappiraj	Bappiraj	Bappiraj, Dilshad Nahar Kona	4:09
5.	"Tumi Je Khoti Korla"	Hasan Motiur Rahman	Hasan Motiur Rahman	Nolok Babu
Total length:					17:56

== Promotion and release ==
On September 10, 2013, the production company Godhuli Films organized a press conference to mark the release of Dhaka to Bombay. Prominent people from the film industry including the artists, art-crews of the film were present in the event.

=== Release ===
The film was released on September 13, 2013, in around 80 theaters across the country including Dhaka.

== Reception ==
The film received mostly negative reviews. It has been widely criticized for its weak story, screenplay and inconsistencies and wrong dialogues.
