= Hero: The Superstar =

2014 film directed by Badiul Alam Khokon

- Theatrical release poster
- Directed by: Badiul Alam Khokon
- Written by: Kashem Ali Dulal
- Based on: Rebel by Raghava Lawrence and Naayak by V. V. Vinayak
- Produced by: Shakib Khan
- Starring: Shakib Khan; Apu Biswas; Eamin Haque Bobby; Amit Hasan; Misha Sawdagor; Shiba Shanu; Rebeka Rouf
- Music by: Ali Akram Shuvo; Arfin Rumi; Shouquat Ali Imon
- Production company: SK Films
- Distributed by: Tiger Media Limited
- Release date: 29 July 2014
- Running time: 160 minutes
- Country: Bangladesh
- Language: Bengali
- Box office: ৳35 million (equivalent to ৳60 million or US$490,000 in 2024)

Hero: The Superstar is a Bangladeshi action comedy film directed by Badiul Alam Khokon. The film stars Shakib Khan in a dual role along with Apu Biswas and Bobby as the female lead, while Amit Hasan, Shiba Shanu, Misha Sawdagor, Nuton, Rebeka Rouf And Uzzal play supporting roles. The film's plot is inspired by two Indian Telugu films: Rebel and Naayak. The film marks the debut of Shakib Khan as a producer.

Hero: The Superstar released on Eid-ul-Fitr of 29 July 2014 in 120 screens which was the widest release for any Bangladeshi film.

== Synopsis ==
Hira is a software engineer by profession and very candid at heart. He is smitten by Priya and he falls in love with her. Salma Khan, Priya's sister and a local rowdy, comes to learn about Hira, and wishes to kill him.

Salma Khan puts her men on Hira's trail and arrives at a place where they plan to kill him, but things don't go as planned. Salma Khan witnesses the killing of a senior police official by Hira, only to return home in complete shock and fear. Puzzled at the sight of the murder, Salma Khan sends her entourage to investigate about Hira.

Meanwhile, a CID officer comes barging into Salma Khan's residence and takes her into custody, where she is told that Hira is wanted for the murder of several rowdies much to the astonishment of everybody. Who is Hira and what prompted him to kill? This forms the rest of the story.

== Cast ==
- Shakib Khan as Hero/Hira
- Apu Biswas as Priya
- Bobby as Bobby
- Misha Sawdagor as Zafar Jwardar aka David
- Amit Hasan as Anwar Chowdhury aka Dollar
- Uzzal as Raihan Chowdhury, Hero and Hira's father
- Rebeka Rouf
- Nuton
- Don
- Elias Kobra

== Reception ==
Abdullah Al Amin (Rubel) of The Daily Star gave the film two stars out of five. He described the plot lines as "tried and true" and, despite being trite, praised the strong script and story. He wrote that "Shakib Khan has done yet another great job" and complimented Sawdagor's performance as the villain. He criticized the costumes and makeup.

== Soundtrack ==
Hero: The Superstar

Soundtrack album by Ali Akram Shuvo Arfin Rumi Shouquat Ali Imon
- Released: 25 July 2014
- Recorded: 2014
- Genre: Film soundtrack
- Language: Bengali
- Label: Tiger Media
- Producer: Shakib Khan

The soundtrack of Hero: The Superstar was composed by Ali Akram Shuvo, Arfin Rumi and Shouquat Ali Imon with the lyrics penned by Sudip Kumar Dip, Kobir Bokul, and Zahid Akbar. The soundtrack features 5 tracks overall.

Hero: The Superstar Album: Track listing
No.	Title	Music	Singer(s)	Length
1.	"Hero The Super Star (Title Track) (This song copied from Telugu song Baadshah (Title Track) from movie Baadshah)"	Ali Akram Shuvo	S I Tutul & Pulok	4:18
2.	"Jekhane Jabe Amake Pabe"	Arfin Rumey	Arfin Rumey & Zarin Tasnim Naumi	5:02
3.	"Dekhe Tor Mayabi Hashi (This song copied from Telugu song Pilla Manchi Bandhobasthu from movie Shadow)"	Ali Akram Shuvo	Asif & Mimi	3:54
4.	"I Love You Hero (This song copied from Telugu song Top Lechipoddi from movie Iddarammayilatho)"	Ali Akram Shuvo	Polash, Tanjina Ruma and Moon	3:57
5.	"Tor Shate Badechi Mon (This song copied from Telugu song Hey Naayak from the original movie Naayak)"	Shouquat Ali Imon	Rupom & Ruma	4:32
Total length:				21:43
