= Bostir Rani Suriya =

2004 Bangladeshi film

- Movie poster
- বস্তির রানী সুরিয়া
- Directed by: Montazur Rahman Akbar
- Screenplay by: Montazur Rahman Akbar
- Story by: Dipjol
- Produced by: Dipjol
- Starring: Sadika Parvin Popy; Shakib Khan
- Cinematography: Lal Mohhammad
- Edited by: Amzad Hossain
- Production company: Popy Films LTD
- Distributed by: Popy Films LTD
- Release date: 15 November 2004 (Bangladesh)
- Country: Bangladesh
- Language: Bengali

Bostir Rani Suriya (Bengali: বস্তির রানী সুরিয়া, lit. 'Suriya: The Slum Queen') is a Bangladeshi film, directed by Montazur Rahman Akbar Original Story and produced by Dipjol. The main role was by National Film Award winning actress Sadika Parvin Popy. The film was declared super hit at the box office but banned by the censor board in 2005.

== Plot ==
When Suriya (Poppy) was very young she was sexually assaulted by a boy of a local politician. She killed that boy and fled to the city. In the city she establishes a gang of women who fight for the rights of the girls in the city. Wherever there is a woman in distress they went there and helped her out of the distress. Mishkatur Rahman (Shakib Khan) comes to the city to find a job and meets Suriya. After first meeting, Suriya liked Mishkat very much and later fell in love with him. Mishkat also started to love her back. They begin to work together to uproot evil from the society and restore peace.

== Cast ==
- Shakib Khan as Miskatur Rahman
- Sadika Parvin Popy as Suriya
- Misha Sawdagor as Raja
- Dipjol as Iqbal Tarashi
- Afzal Sharif as Tengra
- Siraj Haider
- Rasheda Chowdhury
- Chita
- Gangua
- Mehedi
- Boby
- Shahnaz

== Review ==
In 2005, the Bangladesh Film Censor Board permanently revoked the certificate of this film and banned its exhibition throughout the country.
