= List of Bangladeshi films of 2008 =

This is an incomplete list of Bangladeshi films that were released in 2008.

== Box office collection ==
The top ten highest-grossing Bangladeshi films released in 2008, by worldwide box office gross revenue, are as follows.

Highest grossers of 2008
Rank	Title	Production company / distributor	Domestic gross	Worldwide gross	Ref.
1	Priya Amar Priya	Asha Productions	৳15 crore	-	

== Releases ==
Opening	Title	Director	Cast	Genre	Notes	Ref.
25 January	Choto Bon	Sujaur Rahman Suja	Rubel, Shabnur, Ferdous Ahmed, Shimla	Drama		
1 February	Rajdhani Raja	Wazed Ali Bablu	Shakib Khan, Keya, Kazi Hayat	Action		
15 February	Baba Amar Baba	Ilias Kanchan	Ilias Kanchan, Moushumi, Ferdous Ahmed, Shakil Khan, Omar Sunny, Dighi, Ali Raj	Drama		
22 February	Obujh Shishu	Shafiqul Islam Bhairabi	Manna, Moushumi, Dighi, Resi, Kazi Hayat, Abdullah Baki	Drama		
29 February	Shreshto Shontan	Rokibul Alam Rokib	Manna, Popy, Kazi Hayat, Anwara, Misha Sawdagor	Drama		
29 February	Kothin Purush	Shahadat Hossain Liton	Manna, Shabnur, Amit Hasan, Poly, Miju Ahmed	Action		
14 March	Maa Babar Shopno	Reza Latif	Manna, Apu Biswas, Razzak, Miju Ahmed	Drama		
25 March	Ki Jadu Korila	Chandan Chowdhury	Riaz, Popy, Mir Sabbir, Ratna	Romance		
28 March	Tip Tip Bristy	Mohammed Hannan	Shakib Khan, Shabnur, Sharmili Ahmed	Romance		
4 April	Bhalobashar Dushmon	Wakil Ahmed	Shakib Khan, Shabnur, Manna, Khalil, Rajib	Romance		
11 April	Sontan Amar Ahongkar	Shahin Shumon	Shakib Khan, Sahara, Ratna, Amit Hasan, Dolly Zahur	Drama, romance		
18 April	Tumi Swapno Tumi Shadhona	Shahadat Hosen Liton	Shakib Khan, Apu Biswas, Amit Hasan, Anwara	Romance		
25 April	E Chokhe Shudhu Tumi - Divine Love	Symon Tariq	Ferdous Ahmed, Shabnur, Ilias Javed Raj, Shahnoor, Ali Raj,	Romance		
2 May	Bodhu Boron	Nazrul Islam Khan	Moushumi, Amin Khan, Ferdous Ahmed, Kazi Hayat	Drama, romance		
11 July	Swami Niye Juddho	Azadi Hasnat Firoz	Ferdous Ahmed, Shabnur, Kakon, Anna, Khalil, Sharmili Ahmed	Romance		
18 July	Tomakei Khujchi	Motin Rahman	Riaz, Purnima, Champa, Shakil Khan	Romance		
1 August	Megher Kole Rod	Nargis Akter	Riaz, Popy, Tony Dais, Kabori Sarwar, Diti	Drama		
2 October	Amar Ache Jol	Humayun Ahmed	Zahid Hasan, Meher Afroz Shaon, Bidya Sinha Mim, Ferdous Ahmed, Pijush Bandyopadhyay, Munmun Ahmed	Drama, romance	Based on Humayun Ahmed's novel	
2 October	Amader Choto Shaheb	FI Manik	Shakib Khan, Sahara, Apu Biswas, Suchorita	Drama, romance		
2 October	Ek Takar Bou	PA Kajal	Shakib Khan, Shabnur, Romana, Dighi, Razzak	Drama, romance		
2 October	Jodi Bou Shajogo	FI Manik	Shakib Khan, Apu Biswas, Suchorita	Romance		
	Power	Monowar Khokon	Manna, Nipun Akter, Kazi Hayat, Khaleda Akter Kolpona, Miju Ahmed	Action		
2 October	Mone Prane Acho Tumi	Jakir Hossain Raju	Shakib Khan, Apu Biswas, Razzak, Misha Sawdagor	Romance		
28 October	Akash Chhoa Bhalobasa	S. A. Haque Olike	Riaz, Purnima, Razzak, Sharmili Ahmed, Diti	Romance		
31 October	Mayer Shopno	Ilias Kanchan	Ilias Kanchan, Ferdous Ahmed, Popy, Anwara	Drama		
5 December	My Foreign Desh	Asif Akbar	Asif Akbar, Amanda Ireton, Kyle Hughley, Bonnie Belville	Drama	American Bangladeshi film	
9 December	Tomake Bou Banabo	Shahadat Hossain Liton	Shakib Khan, Shabnur, Amin Khan, Anwara	Romance		
9 December	Somadhi	Shahin Sumon	Shakib Khan, Shabnur, Amin Khan	Romance		
9 December	Amar Jaan Amar Pran	Sohanur Rahman Sohan	Shakib Khan, Apu Biswas, Resi	Romance		
9 December	Tumi Amar Prem	Shahin Sumon	Shakib Khan, Apu Biswas	Romance		
26 December	Chandragrohon	Murad Parvez	Riaz, Sohana Saba, Dilara Zaman, Gazi Rakayet, Shahiduzzaman Selim, Champa	Drama, romance		
	Protikuler Jatri - Counter Image	Kawsar Chowdhury		Documentary	Based on the life and works of Alamgir Kabir	
	The Last Thakur	Sadik Ahmed	Tariq Anam Khan, Ahmed Rubel, Tanveer Hassan	Action, drama	British-Bangladeshi film	
	Biyer Prostab	FI Manik	Shakib Khan, Purnima			
	Sathi Tumi Kar	M. M. Sarkar	Riaz, Purnima			
	Ekjon Songe Chhilo	Sawkat Jamil	Riaz, Moushumi			
	Boro Bhai Zindabad	Shafi Iqbal	Rubel, Sinthia, Amin Khan, Nipun Akter	Action		
	Zamindar Barir Meye	Azizur Rahman	Amin Khan, Nipun Akter, Razzak, Suchorita	Romance		
	Pita Matar Amanat	FI Manik	Manna, Purnima, Apu Biswas, Razzak, Kabori Sarwar	Family, drama		
	Babar Jonno Judhdho	Montazur Rahman Akbar	Manna Sirajul Islam Kiron, Nipun Akter	Action		
	Boroloker Jamai	P A Kajal	Manna, Nipun Akter			

== See also ==
- List of Bangladeshi films of 2009
- List of Bangladeshi films
- Dhallywood
- Cinema of Bangladesh
