= My Name Is Sultan =

Bangladeshi political action film

- Movie poster
- Directed by: F I Manik
- Written by: Abdullah Zahir Babu
- Produced by: Bonolota Banichitro
- Starring: Shakib Khan; Sahara; Ahmed Sharif; Misha Sawdagor
- Edited by: Tawhid Hossain Chowdhury
- Music by: Ali Akram Shuvo
- Distributed by: Bonolota Banichitro
- Release date: 20 August 2012
- Country: Bangladesh
- Language: Bengali

My Name Is Sultan (Bengali: মাই নেম ইজ সুলতান) is a Bangladeshi political action film directed by F I Manik. the film stars Shakib Khan and Sahara in the lead roles, with Ahmed Sharif, Misha Sawdagor, Prabir Mitra and Rehana Jolly playing other significant roles in the film. My Name Is Sultan was released on 20 August 2012. Some of the scenes also draw parallels from Sivaji.

== Cast ==
- Shakib Khan as Abir/Sultan
- Sahara as Kajol
- Misha Sawdagor
- Ahmed Sharif
- Prabir Mitra
- Rehana Jolly
- Chikon Ali
- Ratan
- Shamim Ahamed
