= Nishpap Munna =

- Movie poster
- Directed by: Badiul Alam Khokon
- Written by: Kanmani
- Produced by: Mohammad Ali
- Starring: Shakib Khan; Sahara; Misha Sawdagor; Asif Iqbal
- Music by: Ali Akram
- Production company: BFDC
- Distributed by: Mina Films
- Release date: 31 May 2013
- Running time: 150 mins
- Country: Bangladesh
- Language: Bengali

Nishpap Munna (translation: Innocent Munna) is a 2013 Bangladeshi action film directed by Bodiul Alam Khukon. It stars Shakib Khan, Sahara, Misha Sawdagor, Asif Iqbal, Ali Raj and Rehana Jolly in supporting roles. The film was released on 31 May 2013. Upon release, the film received positive to mixed reviews. The movie is a remake of 2006 Telugu film Chinnodu.

== Plot ==
An orphan sentenced for the murder of his foster uncle, Munna spends most of his early life in jail. Upon his release, he tries his best to redeem himself despite facing several hurdles.

== Cast ==
- Shakib Khan as Munna
- Sahara as Antara
- Misha Sawdagor
- Ali Raj
- Rehana Jolly
- Asif Iqbal as Arjo
- Afzal Sharif
- Sathi
- Jadu Azad
- Bipasha (item song)

== Soundtrack ==
The soundtrack was composed by Ali Akram, with lyrics penned by Moniruzamman Monir and Kabir Bokul.

Track listing
No.	Title	Singer(s)	Length
1.	"Tur Monete Thakbo"	S I Tutol, Doli	4:12
2.	"Tumi Jodi Prem Dao"	Andro Kisur, Sabina Yasmin	4:25
3.	"Prem Ase Jar Majhe"	Mun, Onima D Costa	3:33
4.	"Mala"	Polash	4:02
