= Nipun Akter =

Bangladeshi film actress

Nipun
- নাসরিন আক্তার নিপুন
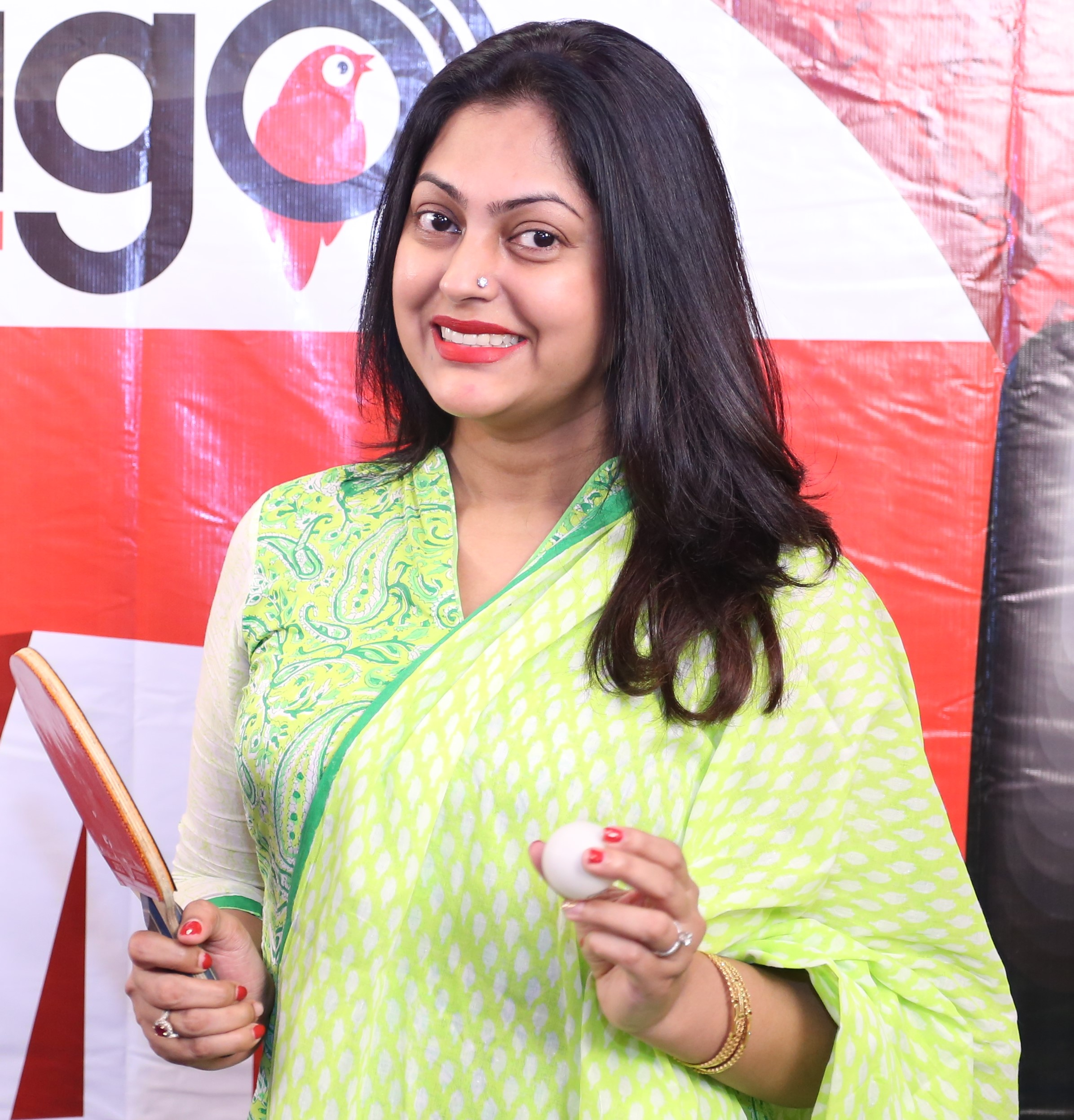
- Akter in 2018
- Born: Nasrin Akter Nipun; 1984 (age 41–42)
- Occupations: Actress, model
- Years active: 2006–present
- Spouse: Muhammad Sazzad Hossain
- Children: Tanisha
- Awards: See full list

Nasrin Akter Nipun, known by her stage name as Nipun is a Bangladeshi film actress. She was the former general secretary of Bangladesh Film Artistes Association, the organisation of local film artists. She won the National Film Awards twice - Best Actress for Shajghor (2007) and Best Supporting Actress for Chander Moto Bou (2009). As of 2014, she has acted in a total of 35 films, including Pitar Ason, Rickshawalar Prem, Praner Shami, and Porichoi.

Deubiting with film Pitar Ason, she quickly made her prominence as a lead actress with films such as Power, Babar Kosom, Koti Takar Fokir, Boro Loker Jamai, Jomidar Barir Meye, & Ma Boro Na Bou Boro. Her notable films as a supporting actress include Tiger Number One, Amar Praner Swami, Boss Number One, Premik Number One , Dhakar King & Adorer jamai

== Background ==
Akter earned her bachelor's in computer science from Moscow State University and she then moved to Los Angeles. She learned Kathak dance in Moscow.

== Career ==
Akter debuted in her acting career in 2006.

Akter acted in the films of West Bengal, including Porichoi (2013) with Prosenjit Chatterjee.

In 2017, Akter was elected as an active member of Bangladesh Film Development Corporation.

Akter has been declared as the newly elected general secretary of the BFAA on Saturday February 5, 2022, while her competitor Zayed Khan disqualified by its appellate board. Sheikh Selim lobbied to get her elected Bangladesh Film Artistes Association. But on 2 March 2022, High Court declared Zayed Khan as rightfully elected general secretary of BFFA. On 21 November 2022, The Appellate Division suspended the High Court verdict. As a result of this order, Akter remained as the general secretary of BFAA.

== Personal life ==
Until 2006, Akter lived in Los Angeles with her husband, Muhammad Sajjad Hosen Opu and a daughter, Tanisha.

In February 2024, Akter purchased nomination papers from Bangladesh Awami League for the seats reserved for women in Jatiya Sangsad for the Chittagong Division. But she eventually did not get the nomination. Nipun is very close and a personal friend of veteran politician Sheikh Selim, who made 17 calls to get Nipun elected as the BFAA secretary.

In April 2025, a murder case was filed against Akter and 16 other actors over the death of a protester in Vatara during the Anti-Discrimination Student Movement against the Awami League government led by Prime Minister Sheikh Hasina.

== Works ==
=== Films ===
Year	Film	Director	Role	Notes
2006	Rotnogarva Ma			Unreleased
2006	Pitar Ason	FI Manik	Raika	
2007	Saajghor	Shah Alam Kiron		Winner: Best Supporting Actress National Film Award
2007	Rickshawalar Prem	Rokibul Alam Rokib		
2007	Amar Praner Swami	P A Kajal		
2007	Babar Kosom	Badiul Alam Khokon		
2007	Meye Opohoron	P A Kajal		
2008	Babar Jonno Judhdho	Montazur Rahman Akbar		
2008	Boro Bhai Zindabad	Shafi Iqbal		
2008	Power	Monowar Khokon		
2008	Zamindar Barir Meye	Azizur Rahman		
2008	Boroloker Jamai	P A Kajal		
2008	Koti Takar Fokir	Razzak		
2009	Chader Moto Bou	Mohammad Hannan		Winner: Best Supporting Actress National Film Award
2009	Shubho Bibaho	Debashish Biswas	Sonia	
2009	Return Ticket	Sohel Rana		
2009	Bondhu Maya Lagaiche	Abu Sufiyan		
2009	Boner Jonno Juddho	Swapan Chowdhury		
2009	Thekao Andolon	Raju Chowdhury		
2009	Aain Boro Na Shontan Boro	A J Rana		
2009	Ma Boro Na Bou Boro	Sheikh Nazrul Islam		
2009	Bhalobashar Sesh Nai	Reza Latif		
2010	Obujh Bou	Nargis Akter		
2010	Boroloker Dosh Din Goriber Ek Din	Kazi Hayat		
2010	Baap Boro Na Shoshur Boro	Shahadat Hossain Liton		
2011	Tiger Number One	Shahin Sumon		
2011	Goriber Mon Onek Boro	Mohammad Aslam		
2011	Dui Purush	Chashi Nazrul Islam		
2011	Boss Number One	Badiul Alam Khokon		
2011	Adorer jamai	Shahadat Hossion Liton		
2012	Maruf er Challenge	Shahadat Hossain Liton		
2012	Bazarer Coolie	Montazur Rahman Akbar		
2012	Tumi Ashbe Bole	Ashraful Rahman		
2012	Attodan	Shahjahan Chowdhury		
2012	Hothat Sedin	Basu Chatterjee		
2012	Dhakar King	Shafi Uddin Shafi		
2012	Shiulimoni	Sadeq Siddqui		
2013	Antardhan	Syed Wahiduzzaman Diamond		
2013	Eito Bhalobasha	Shahin Kabir Tutul	Rani	
2013	Premik No. One	Rokibul Islam Rokib	Tania	
2013	Porichoi	Rupali Guha		
2013	Padma Parer Parborti	Rafiq Sikder	Parborti	
2014	Mayer Momota	Mostafizur Rahman Babu		
2014	I Don't Care	Mohammad Hossain	Jaan Mirza	
2014	Ek Cup Cha	Naim Imtiaz Neyamul		
2014	Kacher Shotru	M A Awal		
2014	Ekattorer Maa Jononi	Shah Alam Kiran	Jomila	
2014	Aposhhin	Gazi Mazharul Anwar		
2014	'71 Er Ma Jononi	Shah Alam Kiran		
2015	Swargo Theke Norok	Dr. Arup Ratan Chowdhury		
2015	Kartoos	Bapparaj		
2015	Love 2014	M M Sarker		
2015	Jol Rong	Shah Newaz Kakoli		
2015	Balma Sajan	Ismat Ara Chowdhury Shanti		
2015	Padma Patar Jol	Tonmoy Tansen		
2015	Shovoner Shadhinota	Manik Manobik	Moyna	
2018	Dushor Kuasha	Uttam Akash		
2022	Birotto	Saidul Islam Rana		
2023	Bhagya	Mahbubur Rahman		
TBA	Tobuo Tumi Amar	Raju Ahmed		Unreleased

=== Television ===
Year	Title	Director	Role	Notes
	Dwidha Dando O Bhalobasha	Abir Khan		
	Superstar	Arif-E-Ahnaf		Special drama
	Shubhagomon	Shahidunnabi		Eid Special drama
	Confusion	Abir Khan		Eid Special drama
	Biye Ta Amar Khub Dorkar			
	Shanibarer Chor	Shamim Shahed		Eid special drama
	Laise Fita			
2012	Gafurer Biye	Siddiqur Rahman		Eid special mini TV series
2012	Ekoda Ek Bagher Golay Haar Futia Chilo	Masud Shezan		Eid special mini TV series
2012	Hatem Ali	Masud Shezan		Eid special telefilm
2013	Tini Ekjon Shouvaggoban	Hasan Khorshed		Eid special drama
2013	Dainik Sukhobor Dukhobor	S A Haque Alik		Eid special drama
2013	Priti O Shuveccha	Zahid Hasan		Eid special drama
2013	Money Is No Problem	Masud Shezan		Eid special drama
2013	Duye Duye Panch	Nayeem Imtiaz Neyamul		Eid special drama
2013	The New Hatem Ali	Masud Shezan		Eid special telefilm
2014	Formal-In	Masud Shezan		Eid special mini TV series
2014	Selfie	Masud Shezan		Eid special drama
2014	Formal-In Plus	Masud Shezan		Eid special mini TV series

=== Web series ===
Year	Title	OTT	Character	Co-Artist	Director	Notes
2019	Garden Game	Bioscope	Elora	Riaz, Nipun	Towhid Mitul	

== Awards and nominations ==
Year	Award	Category	Film	Result
2007	National Film Awards	Best Supporting actress	Saajghor	Won
2010	National Film Awards	Best Supporting actress	Chader Moto Bou	Won
2011	Meril Prothom Alo Awards (Critics')	Best Supporting actress	Adorer jamai	Nominated
