= Rajababu: The Power =

2015 Bangladeshi film directed by Badiul Alam Khokon

Rajababu – The Power
- Official poster
- Directed by: Badiul Alam Khokon
- Written by: Boyapati Srinu
- Produced by: Mojammel Haque Sarkar Monir
- Starring: Shakib Khan; Apu Biswas; Bobby; Misha Sawdagor; Uzzal; Diti; Shahnoor; Omar Sani
- Cinematography: Masum Babul
- Edited by: Zinnat Hossain Zinnah
- Music by: Ali Akram Shuvo; Aryan Ashik
- Distributed by: Bhawal Pictures
- Release date: 24 September 2015
- Country: Bangladesh
- Language: Bengali

Rajababu – The Power (Bengali: রাজাবাবু – দ্যা পাওয়ার) is a 2015 Bangladeshi action film directed by Badiul Alam Khokon. The film stars Shakib Khan, Apu Biswas and Bobby in lead roles. It is a remake of the 2012 Telugu film Dammu. The film was released on 24 September 2015 on 152 screens, which is the widest release of any Bangladeshi film up to that date.

== Cast ==
- Shakib Khan – Raja/Rajababu
- Apu Biswas – Sathi
- Bobby – Sweety
- Misha Sawdagor – Diamond
- Uzzal
- Parveen Sultana Diti
- Prabir Mitra
- Omar Sani
- Shahnaz
- Subrata
- Siraj Haider
- Don
- Sadek Bachchu
- Shiba Shanu
- Zamilur Rahman Shakha
- Shahnoor
- Katherine Liv

== Soundtrack ==
=== Track listing ===
No.	Title	Artist(s)	Length
1.	"Raja Babu (Title Track) (This song copied from Telugu song Kajal Chellivaa from movie Balupu)"	S I Tutul
2.	"Bhalobashi Bolish Jodi Ekbar (This song copied from Tamil song Aal Thotta Bhoopathi Nanada from movie Youth)"	Imran
3.	"Toke Kache Pele"	S I Tutul
4.	"Selfie (This song copied from Telugu song Notanki Notanki from movie Power)"	Asif Akbar
5.	"Cholna Dujon Mile"	Bipasha
