= Gangua =

Bangladeshi film actor

- Born: Mohammad Parvez; Bogra
- Years active: 1978–present
- Known for: actor

Mohammad Parvez (known professionally as Gangua) is a Bangladeshi film actor who is known for his role as villain in the cinema of Bangladesh.

== Career ==
Gangua was born in Bogra. He initially starred on the stage. Later in 1978, he was introduced in the Bangladeshi film industry by actor Jashim. His stage name Gangua was given by Jashim. Early in his career, he used to play small roles. In 1992, he played an important role for the first time in the film 'Mustan Raja' directed by Dewan Nazrul. He acted in more than 700 films. His latest movie Rajababu - The Power was released in 2015.
