= Nuton =

Bangladeshi actress

- নূতন
- Born: Farhana Amin Ratna; India
- Occupations: Dancing, film actress
- Years active: 1969-present
- Spouse: Ruhul Amin Babul (1978-present)
- Awards: National Film Award

Farhana Amin Ratna (better known by her stage name Nuton) is a Bangladeshi film actress. She was a dancer from Kishoreganj, Bangladesh. She debuted with the film Nuton Prabhat.

Debuting in 1969, her performance quickly gained attention and she became a new sensation a side actress through films such as Ora Egaro Jon, Sangram, Strir Paona, Onnay Ottachar, Fashir Ashami, Abdullah, Sottho Mittha, Bukher Dhon, Shrotru Dhongsho, Goriber Bondhu, Ondho Prem, Asman Zamin, Sotbhai, Mala Moti, Bodnam, Kabin, Ghoroni, Somman, Mister Maula, Goriber Bondhu, Oshanto, Prem Biroho, Gaddar, Rajdulari, Sonar Cheye Dami, Odhikar, Shahjada, Alangkar, Nay Onnay, Khomotaban, Jalimer Dushmon, Sontrashi Raja, Alangkar, Janer Baji, Notun Porbat, & Awaz,

After 2000, she slowly entered into villainous roles with movies such as Ek Buk Jala, Number One Shakib Khan , My Name Is Khan , Ek Takar Denmohor , Ek Takar Chele Koti Takar Meye, , Ki Prem Dekhaila, Hero: The Superstar , Onnorokom Bhalobasha , Bolona Tumi Amar , & Rangbaaz

== Career ==
Nuton debuted with the film Nuton Probhat (1969). Later, she got her biggest through in the patriotic film Ora Egaro Jon (1972). Her portrayal of a wretched housewife earned her nationwide recognition. Nuton is notable for her negative role as a vamp in the 1988 film Ranga Bhabi. She was awarded Bangladesh National Film Award for Best Supporting Actress in 1991 for her role in Streer Paona. In 1983, Nuton became the first model of the commercial of Lux in Bangladesh.

== Personal life ==
Nuton married film producer Ruhul Amin Babul in 1978.

== Filmography ==
Year	Film title	Role	Director	Notes	Ref.
1969	Nuton Probhat	Nuton	Mustafa Mehmood	debut film	
1972	Ora Egaro Jon		Chashi Nazrul Islam	first hit	
	Fakir Majnu Shah				
	Rajdulari				
1974	Sangram				
1976	Bosundhora				
1985	Annay Abichar				
1986	Birodh				
1988	Ranga Bhabi				
	Alangkar				
1991	Streer Paona		Subhash Dutta	won Bangladesh National Film Award for Best Supporting Actress	
	Moheshkhalir Banke				
	Shahjada				
	Kar Pape				
	Konya Bodol				
1994	Dakat	Sheema			
1995	Boner Raja Tarzan	Poli			
	Chena Mukh				
	Prem Bondhon				
	Rajmohol				
	Sonar Chheye Dami				
	Jodi Jantem				
	Bodnaam				
	Somoy Kotha Bole				
	Amar Ma				
	Prem Biroh				
	Shirin Farhad				
	Babodhan				
	Awaz				
	Pran Sojoni				
	Gaddar				
	Golbahar				
	Taj o Talwar				
	Suroj				
	Patal Bijoy				
	Odhikar				
	Oshanto				
	Grihobibad				
	Sawdagar				
	Kabin				
	Sot Bhai				
	Mr. Maola				
	Mala Moti	Mala			
	Ruper Rani Gaaner Raja				
	Nache Nagin				
	Shahosh				
	Pagla Raja				
1997	Ami Shei Meye			Indian-Bangla production	
2010	Number One Shakib Khan		Bodiul Alam Khokon		
2010	Crime City	Boss	Babul Reza	as a villain	
2013	Ki Prem Dekhaila		Shah Muhammad Songram		
2013	Onnorokom Bhalobasha		Shahin-Sumon	released on February 15, 2013	
2013	My Name is Khan		Bodiul Alam Khokon		
2014	Hero: The Superstar		Bodiul Alam Khokon		
2015	Putro Ekhon Poisawala		Nargis Akter		

== Television appearances ==
Year	Program	Anchor	Aired on
2015	Amar Chhobi	Shahfiuzzaman Khan Lodi	Channel i

== Awards ==
Year	Award Title	Category	Film	Result
1987	Bachsas Awards			Won
1991	National Film Award	Best Supporting Actress	Strir Paona	Won
2015	Bangla Cine Awards	Lifetime Achievement Award		Won
