= Adorer Jamai =

Bangladeshi action comedy film

- Directed by: Shahadat Hossain Liton
- Produced by: Faridur Reza Sagor; Ibne Hasan Reza
- Starring: Shakib Khan; Apu Biswas; Nipun; Misha Sawdagor
- Music by: Ali Akram Shuvo
- Production company: Impress Telefilm Limited
- Distributed by: Ashirbad Chalochitra
- Release date: 30 December 2011
- Country: Bangladesh
- Language: Bengali

Adorer Jamai (Bengali: আদরের জামাই; transl. "Dearest Son-in-law") is a Bangladeshi action comedy film directed by Shahadat Hossain Liton and produced by Impress Telefilm Limited. The film features Shakib Khan and Apu Biswas in the lead roles, with Nipun and Misha Sawdagor in other pivotal roles.

Shakib Khan and Nipun Akhtar received nominations for Best Film Actor and Best Film Actress respectively at the 14th Meril-Prothom Alo Awards.

== Cast ==
- Shakib Khan
- Apu Biswas
- Nipun Akter
- Misha Sawdagor
- Sadek Bachchu

== Music ==
The film's music was directed by Ali Akram Shuvo.

== Release ==
The film was released in cinemas on 30 December 2011.

== Awards ==
Meril Prothom Alo Awards

- Nominate: Best Actor - Shakib Khan (Critics Choice)
- Nominate: Best Actress - Nipun (Critics Choice)
