= Tiger Number One =

- Shakib Khan as Tiger in the film
- Directed by: Shaheen Sumon
- Screenplay by: Shaheen Sumon
- Story by: Abdullah Zahir Babu
- Produced by: Mothor Rahman
- Starring: Shakib Khan; Nipun; Shahara; Amit Hasan; Misha Sawdagor
- Cinematography: S M Azahar
- Music by: Emon Shah
- Distributed by: S.M.S. Films
- Release date: 31 August 2011
- Running time: 155 min
- Country: Bangladesh
- Language: Bengali

Tiger Number One initialism as Tiger No.1 (Bengali: টাইগার নাম্বার ওয়ান) (earlier titled Nababzada) is a Bangladeshi action film directed by Shahin Sumon. It stars Shakib Khan, Nipun, Shahara, Amit Hasan, Misha Sawdagor, Shiba Shanu, Kazi Hayat, Abul Hayat, and Don, among others. The film was a remake of the 2010 Tamil-language film Raavanan. This was the third film in which Shakib Khan played the villain role. Tiger Number One was released on Eid-ul-Fitr, 31 August 2011.

== Plot ==
The film focuses on an innocent young man who later becomes a dangerous killer in the city and holds a female journalist captive.

== Cast ==
- Shakib Khan as Tiger / Shanto
- Nipun Akter as Sweety
- Shahara as Shopna
- Amit Hasan as Akram
- Misha Sawdagor
- Shiba Shanu
- Kazi Hayat
- Abul Hayat
- Don
- Rehana Joli
- Dolly Johur
- Anna
- Bobi
- Kabila

== Themes ==
According to Orchi Othondrila, mainstream Bangladeshi films are "always based on a central hero while female characters are there as objects to complement [the] hero's actions." She wrote that, as with many other Shakib Khan film titles, the title Tiger Number One implies "that the stories are solely depended on the hero who is the centre of the actions."

== Music ==
The music for Tiger Number One was directed by Imon Shah.
