= Bolbo Kotha Bashor Ghore =

- VCD cover
- Bengali: বলব কথা বাসর ঘরে
- Directed by: Shah Mohammad Shagram
- Written by: Shah Mohammad Songram
- Produced by: Omar Faruk
- Starring: Shakib Khan; Shabnur; Sahara; Omar Sani
- Edited by: Mizno
- Music by: Shawkat Ali Emon; Kabir Bakul (lyrics)
- Distributed by: Eagle Music
- Release date: 2009
- Country: Bangladesh
- Language: Bengali

Bolbo Kotha Bashor Ghore (Bengali: বলব কথা বাসর ঘরে, lit. 'I'll Talk in the Bridal Chamber') is a Bangladeshi romantic drama film, written and directed by Shah Mohammad Sangram, produced by Omar Faruk and distributed by Eagle Music. The film was released in 2009 all over Bangladesh. This film is based on a romantic and family drama story. It features Shakib Khan, Shabnur, Sahara and many more. It became one of the box-office success films of 2009.

== Synopsis ==
Iqbal is benevolent and a friend to the poor. While helping others, he gets into a conflict with Chaiti, the arrogant owner of the Chaiti Group. As Chaiti seeks revenge, she loses her business and ends up on the streets. Her downfall stems from her arrogance. At that moment, Iqbal extends a hand of love.

== Cast ==
- Shakib Khan as Iqbal / IK
- Shabnur as Chaity Chowdhury
- Sahara as Kajol
- Omar Sani
- Anwara as Iqbal's mother
- Kazi Hayat
- Kabila
- Amol Bose
- Dulari
- Abu Sayeed Khan

== Crew ==
- Director: Shah MO. Shagram
- Producer: Omar Farukk
- Story: Shah MO. Shagram
- Script: Shah MO. Shagram
- Music:Shawkat Ali Imon
- Lyrics: Kabir Bokul
- Distributor: Eagel Music

== Technical details ==
- Format: 35 MM (Color)
- Real: 13 Pans
- Original Language: Bengali
- Country of Origin: Bangladesh
- Date of Theatrical Release: 2009
- Technical Support: Bangladesh Film Development Corporation (BFDC)

== Music ==
=== Soundtrack ===
No.	Tracks	Singer
1	Bolbo Kotha Bashor Ghore	Asif And Kanak Chapa
2	Emoni Kopal Hoina	S I Tutul
3	Je Amar Mon Kerechhe	Runa Laila
4	Mon Bhasaiya Premer Sampane	Andrew Kishore and Dolly Sayontoni

== Awards and nominations ==
Meril Prothom Alo Awards

- Public Choice Awards for Best Film Actress - Shabnur
- Best Actor - Shakib Khan (nom)
- Best Singer (Female) - Kanak Chapa (nom)
