= Shouquat Ali Imon =

Bangladeshi music composer

- শওকত আলী ইমন
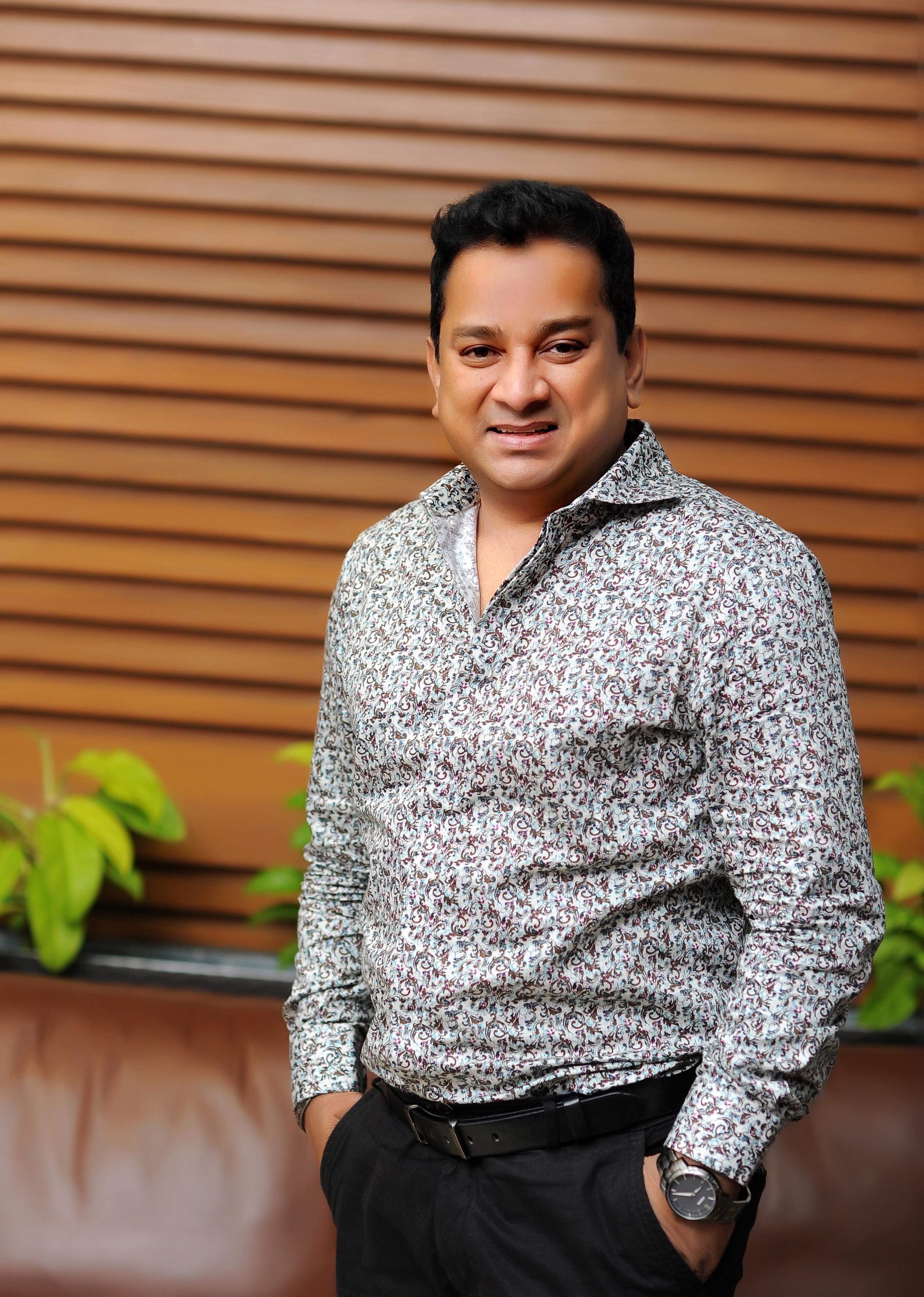
- Imon in 2018
- Born: 1971 (age 54–55); Dhaka, East Pakistan, Pakistan
- Other name: Saimon
- Occupation: Musician
- Years active: 1996-present
- Spouse: Bijori Barkatullah (m. 1995; div. 2012)
- Children: 1
- Relatives: Abida Sultana (sister)

Shouquat Ali Imon (also known as Saimon; born 1971) is a Bangladeshi music composer. He won Bangladesh National Film Award for Best Music Director for the film Purno Doirgho Prem Kahini (2013) and Best Music Composer for Payer Chhaap (2022). He also won Babisas Awards for Best Music Director in film Black Money (2015). He served as one of the judges of the television show Black Horse RTV Golden Key – Ebar Tomra Gao. In the 1990s, he was a member of the musical bands Chime and Pentagon.

== Background ==
Imon was born in Dhaka in the then East Pakistan. His father, Abdus Salam, was a writer from Manikganj District.

== Career ==
In his early years, Imon served as an assistant of music composer Satya Saha.

Imon debuted his film career through the film Rooti (1996). He performed as a playback singer for a few films under the pseudonym Saimon. He composed music of Akhi Alamgir's debut album, Tomar Chokh (2011) and Tareen Jahan's debut album Akash Debo Kakey (2011).

The T-20 Cricket World Cup, featuring the Twenty20 format, is an international cricket tournament. Fans passionately cheer on the Bangladesh cricket team, known as the "Tigers." "Char Chokka Maro," a song composed by Shouquat Ali Imon, has become an anthem for the team and its supporters.

== Personal life ==
Imon was married to actress Bijori Barkatullah from 1995 to 2012. Together they have a daughter Urbana Shawkat. Imon has five sisters, Abida Sultana, Rebeka, Rehena, Chitra and Salma (d. 2016), and a brother, Mohammad Ali Shumon. Shumon is the founding member of the band Pentagon.

In 2013, Imon then married Jinat Kabir Tithi. In 2014, he was arrested after a blackmail attempt complaint was filed by Tithi. He later denied the allegations and the case did not result in convictions. The marriage ended in divorce as well.

Imon married his third wife Hridita Reza, a news presenter in a private television channel, on 27 February 2020. On 27 September, Imon was arrested by the police after Reza accused him of physically torturing her in a case.

== Works ==
- Rooti (1996)
- Andhokare Chita (2003)
- Hridoyer Bandhon (2001)
- Ek Takar Bou (2008)
- Shubho Bibaho (2009)
- Mon Jekhane Hridoy Sekhane (2009)
- Bolbo Kotha Bashor Ghore (2009)
- 5 Takar Prem (2010)
- Koti Takar Prem (2011)
- Ek Mon Ek Pran (2012)
- Don Number One (2012)
- Nishwartha Bhalobasa (2013)
- Purno Doirgho Prem Kahini (2013)
- Ki Prem Dekhaila (2013)
- Bhalobasha Zindabaad (2013)
- Tobuo Bhalobashi (2013)
- Kistimaat (2014)
- Big Brother (2015)
- Love Marriage (2015)
- Aashiqui (2015)
- Black Money (2015)
- Baje Chele (2016)
- Bossgiri (2016)
- Ohongkar (2017)
- Dhat Teri Ki (2017)
- Pashan (2018)
- Megh Kanya (2018)

== 1990s ==
Year	Film	Notes
1996	Ruti	
1998	Andho Ain	
1998	Kalo Choshma	
1999	Lathi	
1999	Moger Mulluk	

== 2000s ==
Year	Film	Notes
2000	Ami Gunda Ami Ee Mastan	
2000	Gunda Number One	
2000	Mone Pore Tomake	
2001	Bichchu Bahini	
2001	Bagher Bachcha	
2001	Hridoyer Bandhon	
2001	Raja Number One	
2002	Billu Mastan	
2002	Dadagiri	
2002	Swami Streer Juddho	
2003	Andhokare Chita	
2003	Baap Betar Lorai	
2003	Baghe Baghe Lorai	
2003	Durdhorsho Khuni	
2003	Humkir Mukhe	
2003	Khuner Porinam	
2003	Matir Phul	
2003	Noora Pagla	
2003	Rangbaz O Police	
2003	Shotrur Mokabela	
2003	Villain	
2004	Amader Sontan	
2004	Bagher Bachcha	
2004	Deewana Mastana	
2004	Ek Lutera	
2004	Kothin Purush	
2004	Lootpaat	
2004	Teji Purush	
2004	Tornado Kamal	
2005	Bishakto Chokh	
2005	Ora Kara?	
2006	Ajker Gorom Khobor	
2006	Chor Chor	
2006	Dafon	
2006	Dhikkar	
2006	Encounter	
2006	Heera Amar Naam	
2006	Sordar	
2007	Amar Praner Swami	
2008	Ek Takar Bou	
2008	Amar Jaan Amar Pran	composed with Ali Akram Shuvo
2008	Aslam Bhai	
2009	Bolbo Kotha Bashor Ghore	
2009	Bolona Kobul	
2009	Mon Jekhahe Hridoy Sekhane	
2009	Mone Boro Koshto	
2009	Piritir Agun Jwole Dwigun	
2009	Rastar Chhele	
2009	Shuvobibaho	

== 2010s ==
Year	Film	Notes
2010	Chachchu Amar Chachchu	
2010	Ora Amake Bhalo Hote Dilona	
2010	Mayer Jonno Morte Pari	
2010	Pora Jaay Jwoliya Re	
2010	Takar Cheye Prem Boro	
2011	Bondhu Tumi Shotru Tumi	
2011	Hridoy Bhanga Dheu	
2011	Koti Takar Prem	
2011	Priya Amar Jaan	
2012	Bhalobashar Rong	
2012	Don No. 1	
2012	Ek Mon Ek Pran	
2012	Honeymoon	
2012	Most Welcome	
2012	Se Amar Mon Kereche	
2012	The Speed	
2013	Anya Rokom Bhalobasha	
2013	Bhalobasha Zindabad	
2013	Ki Prem Dekhaila	
2013	Purno Doirgho Prem Kahini	Winner: Bangladesh National Film Award for Best Music Direction
2013	Nishwartha Bhalobasha	
2013	Romeo	
2013	Tobuo Bhalobashi	
2014	I Don't Care	
2014	Desha – The Leader	
2014	Hero: The Superstar	
2014	Kistimaat	
2014	Lobhe Paap Paape Mrityu	
2014	Love Station	
2014	Olpo Olpo Premer Golpo	
2014	Prem Korbo Tomar Sathe	
2014	Shopno Je Tui	
2014	Tomake Bhalobashtei Hobe	
2015	Aashiqui	
2015	Action Jasmine	
2015	Agnee 2	
2015	Big Brother	
2015	Black Money	
2015	Game	
2015	Gangster Returns	
2015	Love Marriage	
2015	Missed Call	
2015	Warning	
2016	Baje Chhele: The Loafer	
2016	Bossgiri	
2016	Onek Daame Kena	
2016	Purno Doirgho Prem Kahini 2	
2017	Ohongkar	
2017	Dhat Teri Ki	
2017	Je Golpe Bhalobasha Nei	
2017	Mastan O Police	
2018	Ekti Cinemar Golpo	Runa Laila composed the background score
2018	Pashan	
2018	Megh Kanya (2018)	

== 2020s ==
Year	Film	Notes
2020	Bir	
2020	Jam	
2021	Pagoler Moto Bhalobashi	
2022	Jolchhap	
2022	Mon Debo Mon Nebo†	upcoming

== Lyrics ==
Year	Drama	Notes
2012	Bhalobashar Rong	
2012	Don No. 1	
2013	Bhalobasha Zindabad	
2014	Olpo Olpo Premer Golpo	

== Background score only ==
Year	Film	Composer	Notes
2008	Tomake Bou Banabo	himself	
2011	Koti Takar Prem	himself	
2012	Se Amar Mon Kereche	himself	
2013	Ki Prem Dekhaila	himself	
2015	The Story of Samara		

== Judge ==
Name of the show	Role	TV Channel	Year	Notes
RTV Black Horse : Golden Key	Judge	RTV	2008	
Banglar Gayen	Judge	RTV	2020	
Banglar Gaan : Season 1	Judge	RTV	2021	
Young Star	Judge	RTV	2021	
Banglar Gaan (USA)	Judge	RTV	2022	
Banglar Gaan : Season 2	Judge	RTV	2022	

== Awards ==
S/N	Name of Award / Honour	Years	Category	For the Movie / Work	Note
01	Bangladesh National Film Awards	2013	Best Music Director	Purno Doirgho Prem Kahini	Won
02	Babisas Award	2015		Black Money	Won
03	RTV Music Award	2020	Best Music Director		Won
04	Bangladesh National Film Awards	2022	Best Music Composer	Payer Chhaap	Won
