= Ek Mon Ek Pran =

Bangladeshi romantic drama film

- Directed by: Sohanur Rahman Sohan
- Written by: Anonno Mamun
- Produced by: Korshad Alam
- Starring: Shakib Khan; Apu Biswas; Toma Mirza
- Cinematography: Assauddizaman
- Edited by: Akramul Hak
- Music by: Shouquat Ali Imon
- Release date: 20 April 2012
- Country: Bangladesh
- Language: Bengali

Ek Mon Ek Pran (Bengali: এক মন এক প্রাণ) is a Dhallywood romance drama film directed by Sohanur Rahman Sohan. The film stars Shakib Khan, Apu Biswas, and Toma Mirza and is based on a love triangle, with Toma Mirza starring opposite Khan as the second female lead. Misha Sawdagor, Afzal Sharif, and Ali Raj appear in supporting roles. The film was released on April 20, 2012. The film was loosely inspired by Aamir Khan's 2009 film 3 Idiots, which was directed by Rajkumar Hirani.

== Cast ==
- Shakib Khan
- Apu Biswas
- Toma Mirza
- Ali Raj
- Misha Sawdagor
- Mahmud Sazzad
- Afzal Sharif
- Don

== Soundtrack ==
The soundtrack is composed by Shouquat Ali Imon.

=== Track listing ===
Tracklist
No.	Title	Lyrics	Singer(s)	Length
1.	"Pagli Tor Pagla Koi"	S I Tutul, Roma		5:10
2.	"Tore Koto Valobashi" (Sad)			4:32
3.	"Amar Buker Vitor" (Sad)			4:13
4.	"Bacha Mora"			4:54
5.	"Ei Tumi Sono"		Tawsif, Kona	4:42
6.	"Tomra Thako Upor Tolay" (Sad)		Andrew Kishore, Agun	4:50
7.	"Parody" (Remix)			5:02
