= Kabila (actor) =

Bangladeshi film actor

- Born: Nazrul Islam Shamim; 10 February 1958 (age 68); Pirojpur, Barisal, Bangladesh
- Occupation: Film actor
- Years active: 1991–Present
- Notable work: Ondhokar; Hingsha Protihingsha; Agnee
- Awards: National Film Award (1st time)

Nazrul Islam Shamim (popularly known as Kabila) is a Bangladeshi film actor. He won Bangladesh National Film Award for Best Performance in a Negative Role for the film Ondhokar (2003). He is the current executive member of the Bangladesh Film Artistes Association, the organisation of local film artists.

== Career ==
As an actor with both comedy and negative roles, his career has given many hit films. Some of his notable films as a villain include Shopner Prithibi, Ondhokar, Ma Boro Na Bou Boro, Rongin Rongbaz, Khuni Chairman, Bap Boro Na Sosur Boro, Shamir Shongshar, Ek Takar Bou, Trash, Khuner Bodla, Bidrohi Salauddin, Ke Amar Baba, and Dushtu Meye Misti Chele. Some of his best comedy performances are Amar Shopno, Mayer Chokh, Preme Porechi, and Bolbo Kotha Bashor Ghore.

== Selected films ==
- Danga - 1991
- Traash - 1992
- Babar Adesh - 1995
- Papi Shatru - 1995
- Bichar Hobe - 1996
- Shopner Prithibi - 1996
- Chawa Theke Pawa - 1996
- Shanto Keno Mastan - 1998
- Ke Amar Baba - 1999
- Mayer Samman - 2001
- Abbajan - 2001
- Itihas - 2002
- Abdullah - 2002
- Lal Doriya - 2002
- Dhor - 2002
- Aghat Palta Aghat - 2002
- Hingsha Protihingsha - 2003
- Ondhokar - 2003
- Bachao - 2003
- Ajker Somaj - 2004
- Vondo Neta - 2004
- System - 2006
- Vondo Ojha - 2006
- Dushmon Khotom - 2006
- Ek Takar Bou - 2008
- Ki Jadu Korila - 2008
- Ke Ami - 2009
- Ebadat - 2009
- Swami Streer Wada - 2009
- Jiboner Cheye Dami - 2009
- Amar Praner Priya - 2010
- Chander Moto Bou - 2009
- Golapi Ekhon Bilatey - 2010
- Top Hero - 2010
- Ora Amake Bhalo Hote Dilo Na - 2010
- Mayer Chokh - 2010
- Boss Number One - 2011
- Adorer Jamai - 2011
- Bazarer Coolie - 2012
- Khodar Pore Ma - 2012
- Bhalobasar Rong - 2012
- Onnorokom Bhalobasha - 2013
- Bhalobasa Aaj Kal - 2013
- Full and Final - 2013
- Bhalobasha Zindabad - 2013
- Agnee - 2014
- Excuse Me - 2014
- Olpo Olpo Premer Golpo - 2014
- Hitman - 2014
- My Name Is Simi - 2014
- Ek Cup Cha - 2014
- Action Jasmine - 2015
- Love Marriage - 2015
- Samraat: The King Is Here - 2016
- Mental - 2016
- Swatta - 2017
- Pagol Manush - 2018
- Operation Agneepath - 2019
- Shoshurbari Zindabad 2 -2022
- Bou Niye Juddho (2026)

== Awards and nominations ==
National Film Awards

Year	Award	Category	Film	Result
2003	Bangladesh National Film Awards	Best Performance in a Negative Role	Ondhokar	Won
