= Siraj Haider =

Bangladeshi actor and director

- Born: 6 February 1948
- Died: 11 January 2018 (aged 69)
- Occupations: Actor, director
- Children: Lenin Haider

Siraj Haider (6 February 1948 – 11 January 2018) was a Bangladeshi actor and director. He acted in over 400 films. He also directed two films. He acted in television, stage, radio and jatra too.

Some of his notable films as a villain include "Bhalobashi Tomake", "Dhoriye Din", "Bhalobashar Dushmon", "Beimaner Sasti", "Ke Amar Baba", "Boba Khuni", "Bidrohi Charidike", "Mone Rekho Amai", "Order", "Poradhin", "Mrritur Sathe Panja", "Beimaner Sasti", "Mayer Jonno Juddho", "Khalas", "Jobab De", "Hingahar Poton", O Priya Tumi Kothay, and Shahoshi Manush Chai. His work as a supporting actor include "Bastob", "Nosto", "Ai Jibon Tomar Amar", "Kopal", "Dapot", "Time Nai", "Dhandha Mere Thanda", Priya Amar Priya, Koti Takar Prem, Prem Shonghat, Koti Takar Prem, "Rokkha Nai", "Anondo Pseu", "Ekjon Songe Chili", "Ai Jibon Tomar Amar", "Kata Lash", "Bhalobashar Ghor", "Ajker Gorom Khobor", and "Khesarot".

== Early and personal life ==
Haider was born on 6 February 1948 in Bikrampur, Munshiganj. He made his acting career debut with a drama titled Tipu Sultan in 1962. He was in class nine at that time. Haider was married to Mina Haider. They had two sons and one daughter.

== Career ==
Haider made his acting career debut in Dhallywood with Sukher Songsar. Besides films, he was also involved in acting in television, stage and jatra. He directed many stage dramas too. He founded Rangana Natyagoshthi in 1976.

Haider also directed two films. The name of these two films are Adom Byapari and Sukh. Of them two, Adom Byapari is an unrelated film. Mujib Pardeshi made his acting career debut with Sukh.

== Death ==
Haider died on 11 January 2018 at his own home in Kalyanpur, Dhaka at the age of 69.

== Selected filmography ==
=== Actor ===
- Sukher Songsar
- Top Terror
- Durdanto Dapot
- Ajker Protibad
- Protisruti
- Ananda Ashru
- Valobasar Ghor
- Gundar Prem
- Jibon Jekhane
- Ammajan
- Bostir Rani Suriya
- Nirmom
- Bastob
- Mon Diyechhi Tomake
- Koti Takar Fokir
- Sukher Songsar
- Praner Cheye Priyo
- Khoka Sona
- Sujon Sokhi
- Pagol Mon
- Tumi Boro Vagyoboti
- Khude Joddha
- Priyangka
- Hajar Bachhor Dhore
- Moner Majhe Tumi
- Shotru Shotru Khela
- Eito Prem
- Koti Takar Prem
- Nishwartha Bhalobasa
- Kistimaat
- Mental
- Opomaner Jwala
- Crime Road
- Rudra The Gangster
- Kartuz
- Valobasa.com

=== Director ===
- Sukh
- Adom Byapari
- Bostir Rani Suriya
