= Shahadat Hossain Liton =

Bangladeshi film director

- Born: Bangladesh
- Occupations: Film director, writer
- Years active: 1997–present

Shahadat Hossain Liton (Bengali: শাহাদাত হোসেন লিটন) is a Bangladeshi film director and story writer. He has directed over 50 films.

== Career ==
Shahadat Hossain Liton started his career with the movie Rabi Mastan.

== Filmography ==
- Robi Mastan - 1997
- O Priya Tumi Kothay - 2002
- Rukhe Darao - 2004
- Mia Barir Chakor - 2008
- Tumi Swapno Tumi Sadhona - 2009
- Mayer Haate Beheshter Chabi - 2009
- Preme Porechi - 2009
- Takar Cheyer Prem Boro - 2010
- Kabin Nama - 2007
- Tomake Bou Banabo - 2008
- Jibon Moroner Sathi - 2010
- Thanda Mathar Khuni - 2008
- Nosto Chhatra
- Goriber Dada
- Bolona Kobul
- Jibon Moroner Sathi - 2010
- Adorer Jamai - 2011
- Jor Kore Bhalobasha Hoy Na - 2011
- Tomar Kache Rini - 2014 in as actor Symon Sadik
- Ohongkar (2017) 2017

== See also ==
- Uttam Akash
- SA Haque Alik
