= Boss Number One =

- poster
- Directed by: Bodiul Alam Khokon
- Written by: Kashem Ali Dulal
- Produced by: Mohammad Hossain
- Starring: Shakib Khan; Nipun Akter; Shahara
- Cinematography: Masum Babul; Habib
- Music by: Ali Akram Shubho
- Distributed by: Gramen Films
- Release date: 7 November 2011
- Country: Bangladesh
- Language: Bengali

Boss Number One also (Bengali: বস নাম্বার ওয়ান) is a Bangladeshi romantic action film directed by Bangladeshi filmmaker Bodiul Alam Khokon. The film stars Shakib Khan, Nipun, Sahara and many more.Khan plays the title role. It was released on Eid al Adha on 7 November 2011 and filmed in Bangkok and Bangladesh.

== Cast ==
- Shakib khan as Hridoy Khan/Boss Number One
- Nipun as Aasha Chowdhury
- Sahara as Aalo Chowdhury
- Misha Sawdagor as Dollar Talokdar
- Don
- Prabir Mitra
- Rehana Jolly
- Ali Raj
- Shiba Shanu
- Ilias Kobra
- Tanu
- Rebeca
- Kabila

== Production ==
The film was shot in Bangladesh, Thailand

== Music ==
Boss Number One music was directed by Bangladeshi music director Ali Akram Shubho.

== Accolades ==
=== National Film Awards ===
- Best Actor in a negative role (Best Villain) - Misha Sawdagor (jointly with Shatabdi Wadud for Guerrilla)
