= Kabin =

- Town
- Location in Burma
- Coordinates: 11.783333°N 98.85°E
- Country: Burma
- Region: Taninthayi Region
- District: Kawthaung District
- Township: Bokpyin Township
- Elevation: 10 m (33 ft)
- Time zone: UTC+6.30 (MST)

Kabin is a town in Taninthayi Division, Myanmar.
