= Badiul Alam Khokon =

Bangladeshi film director

- Born: Baghber, Monohardi, Narsingdhi
- Occupation: Film director
- Years active: 2003–present
- Known for: Priya Amar Priya

Badiul Alam Khokon (Bengali: বদিউল আলম খোকন) is a Bangladeshi film director whose films include Priya Amar Priya, Number One Shakib Khan, My Name Is Khan, Hero: The Superstar, and Rajababu - The Power.

== Career ==
Khokon is the general secretary of Bangladesh Film Directors' Association and a member of Cholochitro Poribar. In 2017 he, along with other directors, banned Shakib Khan following his arrogant comments about the film industry. He also prohibited Khan from shooting for his upcoming film Ami Neta Hobo. He made an initiative to give a chance to Apu Biswas for a comeback following her return with the film Andhokar Jibon. He earlier named it Kangal, later the actress rejected the film and Khokon replaced her with Mahiya Mahi and renamed it Ondhokar Jogot. He made a remake of Telugu blockbuster Dammu, titled Rajababu - The Power, which was released in India 2017 in exchange with the Indian film Tomake Chai in Bangladesh.

== Films ==
1. Dhanob (2000)
2. Dhongsho (2001
3. Rustom (2003)
4. Bastob (2003)
5. Dhor Soytan (2004)
6. Nirapotta (2005)
7. Nishpap Koyedi (2006)
8. Lengra Masud (2006)
9. Hingshro Manob (2006)
10. Babar Kosom (2007)
11. Nirdesh (2007)
12. Priya Amar Priya (2008)
13. Nisshash Amar Tumi (2010)
14. Number One Shakib Khan (2010)
15. Bhalobeshe Morte Pari (2010)
16. Ekbar Bolo Bhalobashi (2011)
17. Boss Number One (2011)
18. Amar Challenge (2011)
19. Buk Fotey To Mukh Foteyna (2012)
20. Don Number One (2012)
21. My Name Is Khan (2013)
22. Nishpap Munna (2013)
23. Hero: The Superstar (2014)
24. Daring Lover (2014)
25. Rajababu - The Power (2015)
26. Pagol Manush (2018)
27. Ondhokar Jogot (2019)
28. DayMukti (2025)
29. Tosnos (2026)
30. Officer (2026)
31. Haar Jeet † (Upcoming)
32. Agun † (Upcoming)
33. Amar Ma Amar Behesht † (2022 upcoming film)
