= Don Number One =

- Poster of Don Number One
- Directed by: Badiul Alam Khokon
- Written by: Raghava Lawrence
- Starring: Shakib Khan; Sahara; Misha Sawdagor; Prabir Mitra
- Music by: Shawkat Ali Emon
- Distributed by: Liberty Kothachitro
- Release date: 27 October 2012
- Country: Bangladesh
- Language: Bengali

Don Number One (Bengali: ডন নাম্বার ওয়ান) is a 2012 crime-drama Bangladeshi film directed by Badiul Alam Khokon. The film stars Shakib Khan in the lead role and was released on Eid-ul-Adha of 27 October 2012. It is a remake of Indian Telugu film Don (2007).

== Cast ==
- Shakib Khan as Raja / King Khan / Don
- Sahara as Lalita
- Misha Sawdagor
- Uzzal
- Prabir Mitra
- Khaleda Aktar Kolpona
- Elias Kobra
- Sanko Panja
- Shiba Shanu
- Mehedi
- Sheuli Shila
- Kotha
- Pirzada Shahidul Harun
- Gulshan Ara Ahmed

== Awards ==
Meril Prothom Alo Awards

- Won: Best Actor - Shakib Khan
