= Monir Khan =

Bangladeshi singer

Monir Khan মনির খান
- Born: 1 August 1972 (age 54); Jhenaidah, Khulna, Bangladesh
- Genre: Pop
- Occupation: Singer
- Instrument: Vocal
- Years active: 1991–present
- Labels: MK Music24; Kantho Entertainment
- Spouse: Tahmina Akhtar Iti
- Website: monirkhan.com.bd

Monir Khan is a Bangladeshi singer. In his career he has released 42 solo albums and more than 300 duet and mixed albums. Early life

Monir Khan was born on 1 August 1972 in a renowned Muslim family of Madanpur village of Maheshpur upazila of Jhenaidah district. His father Mohammad Mahbub Ali Khan is a retired school teacher and mother Most. Monwara Khatun is a housewife. Among one sister and four brothers Monir Khan is II and first among the brothers.

== Career ==
In 1989, Monir Khan was listed as a modern song artist by auditioning on Khulna radio. He started singing as a regular artist till August 1991. On 5 September 1991 he came to Dhaka with NOC. Even after coming to Dhaka, he learned songs from some of the elders. Among them are Abubakar Siddiq, Mangal Chandra Biswas, Salahuddin Ahmed, Anup Chakraborty and many others. Whenever he got some good things he tried to take his own life.

After so many days he thought of taking a place in the audio market. Started working according to the thought. Originally inspired by Kutti Mansur, Monir Khan decided to release his songs in the market.

Milton Khondokar agreed to work with Monir Khan and agreed to release audio album. To release audio album, Monir tried to prove himself as a perfect artist through better practice of singing. Monir Khan took four years from 1992 to 1996 to prepare himself.

In 1996, first solo audio album of 12 songs ‘Tomar Kono Dosh Nei’ released from Beauty Corner. The album gets great popularity.

== Albums ==
Monir Khan has released 42 solo albums and more than 300 duet and mixed albums, and has song in more than 100 Bengali films.

== Songs on flood-affected people ==
Monir khan stood by the flood victims and raised funds for them through songs during flood in Sylhet and Sunamganj in 2022. Mr. Khan was saddened and shocked to see the miseries of the affected people and made a humanitarian appeal to all in order to extend helping hands towards the distressed people through the lyrics of a song as severe floods hit the northeastern and southeastern regions of the country in August, 2024. Here are the songs-

Name of song	Year	Lyricist	Music director	Label	Source
Banvashi	2022	Milton Khandokar	Milton Khandokar	MK Music24	
Bonnay Manush Kede Kede More	2024	Amirul Islam	Golam Sarwar	MK Music24	

== Awards ==
He received numerous prizes. He has been honored with Bachsas Awards, Bangladesh Television Reports Award, Bangladesh Cultural Reporters Award, and many other awards at home and abroad.
