= Ali Akram Shuvo =

Ali Akram Shuvo আলী আকরাম শুভ
- Genres: film score
- Occupations: Music director, composer
- Years active: 2004–present
- Father: Dhir Ali Miah

Ali Akram Shuvo is a Bangladeshi music director who has composed music for films. He has composed music for more than 150 films.

== Background ==
Ali Akram Shuvo was born to music composer and director Dhir Ali Miah. His older brother Abu Taher was also in the same profession. Ali Akbar Rupu was has cousin.

== Career ==
Shuvo won the Bachsas Award for Best Music Director in 2012 for film Khodar Pore Ma.

Shuvo composed the song "Monta Kere Nili" for 2018 film Panku Jamai.

== Filmography ==
=== As music composer ===
- Boba Khuni (2002) (lyrics by Jahanara Bhuiyan)
- Bhaier Shotru Bhai (2004)
- Amar Praner Priya (2009)
- Jiboner Cheye Dami (2009)
- Ora Amake Bhalo Hote Dilo Na (2010)
- Bhalobaslei Ghor Bandha Jay Na (2010)
- Number One Shakib Khan (2010)
- Nissash Amar Tumi (2010)
- Adorer Jamai (2011)
- Boss Number One (2011)
- Bhalobasar Rong (2012)
- Khodar Pore Ma (2012)
- Don Number One (2012)
- My Name Is Sultan (2012)
- Full & Final (2013)
- Daring Lover (2014)
- Hitman (2014)
- Antor Jala (2017)
- Ohongkar (2017)
- Crime Road (2017)
- Koto Shopno Koto Asha (2017)
- Daymukti (upcoming)

=== 1990s ===
Year	Album	Notes
1996	Kholnayok	

=== 2000s ===
Year	Album	Notes
2001	Kothin Shasti	
2001	Thekao Mastan	
2002	Boba Khuni	
2002	Nachnewali	
2002	O Priya Tumi Kothay	
2003	Bastob	
2003	Rustom	
2004	Bhaier Shotru Bhai	
2004	Dhor Shoytan	
2005	Khude Joddha	
2006	Sonar Moyna Pakhi	
2007	Machine Man	
2007	Swmair Songsar	
2007	Tomar Jonyo Morte Pari	
2007	Ulta Palta 69	
2008	Amar Jaan Amar Pran	
2008	Chandragrohon	
2008	Elakar Raja	
2008	Mukhomukhi	
2008	Tumi Shopno Tumi Sadhina	composed along with Ahmed Imtiaz Bulbul
2009	Amar Praner Priya	
2009	Chander Moto Bou	
2009	Jiboner Cheye Dami	
2009	Ke Ami?	
2009	O Sathii Re	
2009	Prem Koyedi	

=== 2010s ===
Year	Album	Notes
2010	Amar Buker Modhyekhane	
2010	Bhalobashlei Ghor Bandha Jayna	
2010	Preme Porechhi	
2010	Ora Amake Bhalo Hote Dilo Na	
2010	Number One Shakib Khan	
2010	Nissash Amar Tumi	
2011	Adorer Jamai	
2011	Boss Number One	
2011	Ek Takar Denmohor	
2011	Ekbar Bolo Bhalobashi	
2011	Jaan Kurbaan	
2011	King Khan	
2011	Moner Ghore Boshot Kore	
2011	Moner Jala	
2011	Tor Karone Beche Achhi	
2012	Bhalobasar Rong	
2012	Buk Fatey To Mukh Foteyna	
2012	Don Number One	
2012	Khodar Pore Ma	
2012	Ji Hujur	
2012	My Name Is Sultan	
2013	Full & Final	
2013	Nishpap Munna	
2013	Premik Number One	
2014	Daring Lover	
2014	Hero: The Superstar	
2014	Hitman	
2015	Rajababu: The Power	composed along with Aryan Ashik
2017	Antor Jala (2017)	
2017	Ohongkar	
2017	Crime Road (2017)	
2017	Koto Shopno Koto Asha	
2017	Mar Chokka	
2018	Ami Neta Hobo	

=== 2020s ===
Year	Album	Notes
2021	Soubhagyo	

=== Year Unknown ===
Year	Album	Notes
Ami Ekai Eksho		
Operation Agneepath		
