= Sadek Bachchu =

Bangladeshi actor (1955–2020)

- সাদেক বাচ্চু
- Born: Mahbub Ahmed Sadek; 1 January 1955; Haziganj, Chandpur, East Bengal, Dominion of Pakistan
- Died: 14 September 2020 (aged 65); Dhaka, Bangladesh
- Occupation: Actor
- Years active: 1977–2020
- Spouse: Shahnaz Jahan
- Awards: Bangladesh National Film Award (2018)

Mahbub Ahmed Sadek (Bengali: মাহবুব আহমেদ সাদেক; known as Sadek Bachchu (Bengali: সাদেক বাচ্চু); 1 January 1955 – 14 September 2020) was a Bangladeshi film actor. He also appeared in television dramas and theatre. He won Bangladesh National Film Award for Best Actor in Negative Role for the film Ekti Cinemar Golpo (2018).

== Early life and career ==
Bachchu was born, as Mahbub Ahmed Sadek, on 1 January 1955 in Haziganj, Chandpur in the then East Bengal. He made his acting debut with Shahidul Amin directed Ramer Sumati. and later appeared in various films.

His ability to portray both negative and supporting characters have made him one of the most prominent Bangladeshi actors. Among his most notable villainous roles are in Shami Keno Asami, Muktir Shongram, Ek Joban, Milon Hobe Koto Dine, Chokranter Shikar, Ke Amar Baba, Manush Manusher Jonno, Ei Mon Tomake Dilam, Koti Takar Fokir, Papi Shotru, Rustom, Etim Raja, Raj Golam, Ei Badon Jabe Na Chire, Shopner Purush, Sahoshi Manush Chai, Noyon Vora Jol, Moron Kamor, Bhul Sob E Bhul, Dosto Amar, Adorer Sontan, Sotter Shongram, Attosat, Najayez, 10 Number Moha Bipod Songket, Jibon Shimante, Rangbaz (2017), & Judge Barrister Police Commisoner. His notable films as a supporting actor include Lal Doriya, Uttejito, Strir Morjada, Koti Takar Kabin, Bondhu Jokhon Shotru, Amar Protigga, Porena Choker Polok, Mon Bosena Porar Tabil E, Captain Khan (2018), & Bossgiri.

== Work ==
Films

- Ramer Sumoti (1985)
- Chandni (1991)
- Sujon Sakhi (1994)
- Disco Dancer (1994)
- Papi Shatru (1995)
- Priyojon (1996)
- Ananda Ashru (1997)
- Lal Badsha (1999)
- Ke Amar Baba (1999)
- Moron Kamor (1999)
- Sahoshi Manush Chai (2003)
- Koti Takar Kabin (2006)
- Amar Praner Swami (2007)
- Moydan (2007)
- Badhubaran (2008)
- Mayer Hate Behester Chabi (2009)
- Mon Bosena Porar Table-e (2009)
- Ek Jaban (2010)
- Amar Swapna Amar Songsar (2010)
- Nissash Amar Tumi (2010)
- Mayer Chokh (2010)
- Bukh Fate To Mukh Fotena (2012)
- Jiddi Mama (2012)
- Durdhorsho Premik (2012)
- Buk Fatey To Mukh Foteyna (2012)
- Judge Barrister Police Commissioner (2013)
- Dhaka To Bombay (2013)
- Jor Kore Bhablobasha Hoy Na (2013)
- Jibon Nodir Tire (2013)
- Tomar Majher Ami (2013)
- Ki Prem Dekhaila (2013)
- Inchi Inchi Prem (2013)
- Bhalobasha Zindabad (2013)
- Lov E Pap Pape Mrittu (2014)
- Shopno Je Tui (2014)
- Mohua Sundori (2015)
- Dui Prithibi (2015)
- Bhalobasha Shimahin (2015)
- Love Marriage (2015)
- Rajababu - The Power (2015)
- Lover Number One (2015)
- Commissioner (2015)
- Aro Bhalobashbo Tomay (2015)
- Black Money (2015)
- Dui Prithibi (2015)
- Bullet Babu (2016)
- Purnodoirgho Prem Kahini 2 (2016)
- Raja 420 (2016)
- Mia Bibi Raji (2016)
- Matir Pori (2016)
- Bossgiri (2016)
- Rangbaz (2017)
- Chol Palai (2017)
- Dhat Teri Ki (2017)
- Ekti Cinemar Golpo (2018)
- Super Hero (2018)
- Captain Khan (2018)
- Bikkhov (2021)

== Death ==
Bachchu died in a hospital on 14 September 2020, aged 65, after being diagnosed with COVID-19 during the COVID-19 pandemic in Bangladesh.
