= S.I. Tutul =

Bangladeshi singer and musician

S.I. Tutul এস.আই. টুটুল
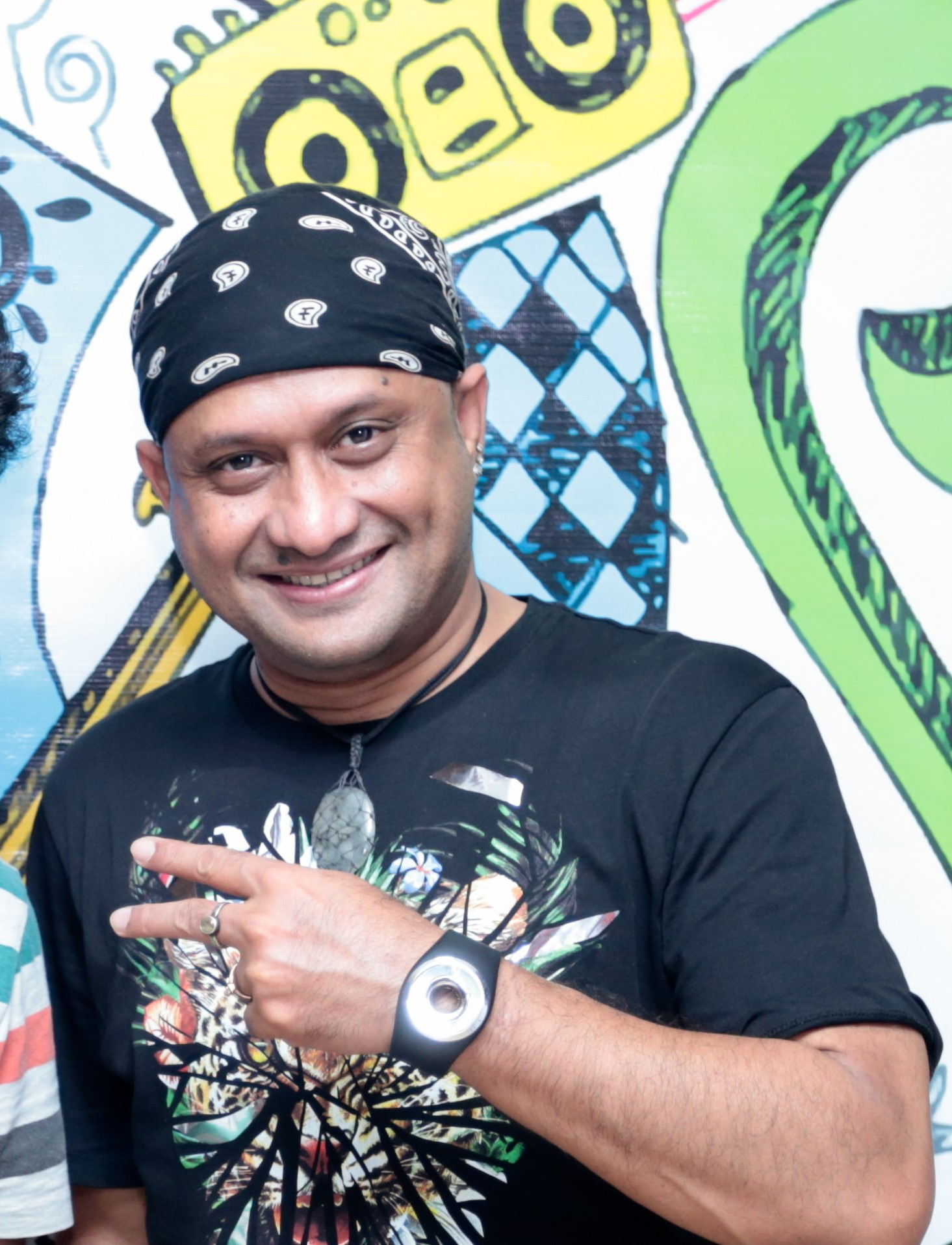
- Tutul in May 2019

Background information
- Born: A B M Shahidul Islam Tutul
- Genres: Pop Rock
- Occupations: Singer-songwriter, music director, music composer, Background scorar musician and actor
- Instruments: Vocals, piano, keyboard, guitar
- Years active: 1991–present
- Formerly of: Love Runs Blind

A B M Shahidul Islam Tutul, known as S.I. Tutul, is a Bangladeshi singer and musician who is the lead singer and lead guitarist of the Dhrubotara. He graduated from the University of Chittagong. He also works in the Bangladeshi film industry. He won Bangladesh National Film Awards for Best Music Director (Daruchini Dwip, 2007), Best Music Composer (Bapjaner Bioscope, 2015) and Best Male Playback Singer (Bhalobaslei Ghor Bandha Jay Na, 2010; Bapjaner Bioscope, 2015).

== Musical career ==
Tutul was a founding member of the band LRB( Love Runs Blind. In 2005, he founded a band called "Face to Face" which was later renamed to Dhrubotara in 2011.

Tutul won an International film award as a music director In 2006, (Bangladesh won an international film award first time from the International Film Festival in Chennai for the film 'Nirontor). Tutul was the music director of the film, which was selected as a Bangladeshi submission for Academy Award in 2006.'

In 2005, film maker Mostofa Sarwar Farooki offered Tutul a movie called Bachelor which was a success and brought him nationwide fame as a composer and Music Director . The movie won a number of international awards, especially for the song ‘Keu Prem Kore’ (‘Everyone Loves’) which was a hit in Bangladesh and was tuned, composed and sung by S I Tutul. Tutuls two songs "Amar majhe nei akhon Ami " and "Shopno Tumi shotti Tumi "sang by Asif akbor and Samina choudhury won two national film award in 2006 film call "Rani kuthir Baki Itihash" . Tutuls another song "Jodi Mon Kade " sang by Meher afroz Saon won another national film award in 2016 film call "Krishnopoksho"

== Personal life ==
Tutul has two sons and one daughter named Sreyash Ahmed, Arosh Ahmed and Ayat Ahmed.

== Awards ==
Tutul won an international award in 2006 as a music director for the film Nirontor from International Film Festival in Chennai, along with several other awards.
