= Rehana Jolly =

Bangladeshi film actress

- রেহেনা জলি
- Occupation: Actress
- Years active: 1985–present
- Notable work: Ma O Chele
- Awards: Bangladesh National Film Awards

Rehana Jolly is a Bangladeshi film actress. She won the Bangladesh National Film Awards for her role in the film Ma O Chele. She started her acting career with the film Maa O Chhele. Since 1985 she has acted over 400 films.

== Notable films ==
- Ma o Chhele (1985)
- Nishpap
- Biraj Bou
- Prem Protigga
- Golmaal
- Moharani
- Chetona
- Prayoshchitto
- Tumi Acho Hridoye (2007) as Sagor's mother
- Unknown Love (2015)
- Ohongkar (2017)
- My Darling (2018)

== Awards ==
List of awards received by Rehana Jolly
Year	Award	Category	Film	Result
1985	Bangladesh National Film Awards	Best Supporting Actress	Ma O Chele	Won
