= Afzal Sharif =

Bangladeshi television and film actor

- আফজাল শরীফ
- Born: 1959 (age 66–67)
- Occupation: Actor

Afzal Sharif is a Bangladeshi television and film actor. He acts mostly in comic roles. He won Bangladesh National Film Award for Best Actor in Comic Role in 2010 for his role in Nissash Amar Tumi.

== Career ==
Sharif started his acting career as a stage actor in 1984. He performed regularly at stages until 1995. He debuted his television career through Bohubrihi drama serial in 1988. His first released film was Padma Nadir Majhi (1992).

Sharif has been suffering from spinal and bone issues since 2014. In September 2018, Prime Minister Sheikh Hasina provided financial assistance of Tk. 20 lakh for his medical expenses.

== Works ==
=== Theatre ===
- Jamidar Darpan
- Khotobi-kkhato
- Shat Ghater Kanakori
- Rakkhushi
- Mahapurush

=== Television ===
- Bohubrihi
- Ayomoy

=== Films ===
- Padma Nadir Majhi
- Dangafasad
- Priyo Podorekha
- Abdar
- Chachchu (2006)
- Banglar Bou (2007)
- Natojanu
- Kistimaat
- Musafir
