= List of awards and nominations received by Shakib Khan =

Shakib Khan awards and nomination
Awards and nominations (Note: In the infobox, an award won is not considered a nomination.)
Awards	Wins	Nominations
National Film Awards	4	0
Bachsas Awards	3	0
Meril Prothom Alo Awards	8 (Note: Including Best Actor in Critics Choice)	14
Lux Channel i Performance Awards	1	2
CJFB Performance Awards	7	1
Bharat Bangladesh Film Awards	1	3
BCRA Awards	2	0
Ifad Film Club Awards	2	0
ATN Bangla Performance Awards	1	0
Tele Cine Awards	1	0
Babisas Awards	2	0
BFDA Awards	1	0
Others	8	3
- Total
Wins	39
Nominations	21
- References

Shakib Khan (born 28 March 1979) is a Bangladeshi film actor, producer, occasional singer, film organiser and media personality. Khan with a prolific career of over 250 films, has earned numerous accolades and become one of the most award-winning entertainers in Dhallywood with more than 30 awards including four National Film Awards, nine Meril Prothom Alo Awards, three Bachsas Awards and seven CJFB Performance Awards. For the role of Surja, an independent young man in the family-drama film Bhalobaslei Ghor Bandha Jay Na (2010), he has received his first National Film Awards for Best Actor at the 35th National Film Awards in 2010. For role of Munna, a boy who deeply love his mother and got separated from his mother when he was quite young in the action drama film Khodar Pore Ma, he received his second National Film Awards for Best Actor in 2012. In 2015, he portrait as himself, a famous film star who later fall in love with a simple girl and committed suicide for her in the romantic drama Aro Bhalobashbo Tomay and earned him his third National Film Awards for Best Actor. For the role of Sabuj, a drugs addicted spoiled son of a rich man, who keeps himself out of society in romantic drama film Swatta (2017), he received his fourth National Film Awards for Best Actor.

He has won total Nine Meril Prothom Alo Awards, which is the highest number of any male film actor. He received his first Meril Prothom Alo Awards for Best Actor for Amar Praner Swami for the role of Raju in 2007. In addition to this he won the award seven more times. In 2016, he portrait as Sultan alias Raghab, a disguised professional assassin with mysterious past, tasked with assassinating a top government official in the action thriller Shikari, he received his eighth Meril Prothom Alo Awards for Best Actor prior this he also earned a Tele Cine Awards for Best Actor (Bangladesh). Khan has also received an honoured as New Generation Actors at the 4th Cholochitra Mela in 2012. In 2022, he was honored with Bachsas Sammanna-2022 for his outstanding contribution to Bengali cinema.

== National Film Awards ==
Year	Category	Nominated work	Result	Ref
2012	Best Actor	Bhalobaslei Ghor Bandha Jay Na (2010)	Won	
2014	Best Actor	Khodar Pore Ma (2012)	Won	
2017	Best Actor	Aro Bhalobashbo Tomay (2015)	Won	
2019	Best Actor	Swatta	Won	

== Bachsas Awards ==
Year	Category	Nominated work	Result	Ref
2009	Best Actor	Jodi Bou Sajogo (2008)	Won	
2014	Best Actor	Bhalobaslei Ghor Bandha Jay Na (2010)	Won	
2019	Best Actor	Swatta (2017)	Won	

== Meril-Prothom Alo Awards ==
Year	Section	Category	Nominated work	Result	Ref
2003	Critics choice award	Best Actor	Praner Manush	Nominated	
2005	Critics choice award	Best Actor	Shuva	Nominated	
2006	People choice award	Best Actor	Chachchu (2006)	Nominated	
2007	Critics choice award	Best Actor	Amar Praner Swami (2007)	Won	
2007	People choice award	Best Actor	Amar Praner Priya	Nominated	
2008	People choice award	Best Actor	Priya Amar Priya (2008)	Won	
2009	People choice award	Best Actor	Bolbo Kotha Bashor Ghore (2009)	Nominated	
2010	People choice award	Best Actor	Bhalobaslei Ghor Bandha Jay Na (2010)	Won	
2011	People choice award	Best Actor	King Khan (2011)	Won	
2011	Critics choice award	Best Actor	Adorer Jamai (2011)	Nominated	
2012	People choice award	Best Actor	Don Number One (2012)	Won	
2013	People choice award	Best Actor	Purno Doirgho Prem Kahini (2013)	Won	
2014	People choice award	Best Actor	Hero: The Superstar (2014)	Won	
2015	People choice award	Best Actor	Eito Prem (2015)	Nominated	
2016	People choice award	Best Actor	Shikari (2016)	Won	
2016	Critics choice award	Best Actor	Shikari (2016)	Nominated	
2017	People choice award	Best Actor	Rajneeti (2017)	Nominated	
2018	People choice award	Best Actor	Super Hero (2018)	Nominated	
2019	People choice award	Best Actor	Password (2019)	Nominated	
2021	People choice award	Best Actor	Nabab LLB (2021)	Nominated	
2022	People choice award	Best Actor	Golui (2022)	Nominated	
2023	People choice award	Best Actor	Priyotoma	Nominated	
2024	People choice award	Best Actor	Toofan	Won	

== Lux Channel i Performance Awards ==
Year	Section	Category	Nominated work	Result	Ref
2007	People choice award	Best Film Actor	Shuva (2006)	Nominated	
2007	Critics award	Best Film Actor	Shuva (2006)	Nominated	
2009	People choice award	Best Film Actor	Priya Amar Priya (2008)	Won	

== CJFB Performance Awards ==
Year	Category	Nominated work	Result	Ref
2008	Best Actor	Priya Amar Priya	Won	
2009	Best Actor	Amar Praner Priya	Won	
2010	Best Actor	Number One Shakib Khan	Won	
2011	Best Actor	King Khan	Won	
2020	Best Actor	Nolok	Won	
2021	Best Actor	Shahenshah	Won	
2025	Best Actor	Rajkumar	Nominated	
2025	Best Actor	Toofan	Won	

== Tele Cine Awards ==
Year	Category	Nominated work	Results	Ref
2016	Best Actor (Bangladesh)	Shikari	Won	
2022	Best Actor (Bangladesh)	Password	Won	
2022	Best Actor (Bangladesh)	Bir	Won	

== Television Reporters Association of Bangladesh (Trab) Awards ==
Year	Category	Nominated work	Results	Ref
2018	Best Actor	Nabab	Won	

== Bharat Bangladesh Film Awards ==
Year	Category	Nominated work	Result	Ref
2019	Best Popular Actor	Password	Won	
2019	Best Actor	Nolok	Nominated	
2019	Best Actor	Super Hero	Nominated	
2019	Best Actor	Captain Khan	Nominated	

== Channel i Digital Media Awards ==
Year	Category	Nominated work	Results	Ref
2021	Best Actor	Bossgiri	Won	

== Dhallywood Film and Music Awards ==
Year	Category	Nominated work	Results	Ref
2009	Best Actor	Ek Takar Bou	Won	
2022	Best Actor	Popular	Won	
2026	Best Film Actor	Borbaad	Won	

== Babisas Awards ==
Year	Category	Nominated work	Results	Ref
2010	Best Actor	Number One Shakib Khan	Won	
2023	Best Actor	Priyotoma	Won	

== Filmfare Awards Bangla ==
Year	Category	Nominated work	Results	Ref
2017	Best Actor	Shikari	Nominated	

== BFDA Awards ==
Year	Category	Nominated work	Results	Ref
2024	Best Actor	Priyotoma	Won	

== BIFA Awards ==
Year	Category	Nominated work	Results	Ref
2026	Best Film Actor	Taandob	Nominated	

== Other awards and honours ==
Walton Boishakhi Star Awards

- Won: Best Actor – 2011

BCRA award

- Won: Best Actor for Jaan Amar Jaan 2009
- Won: Best Actor 2011

Akota Awards 2005

- Nom: Best Actor for Amar Swapno Tumi

Binodon Bichitra Award 2010

- Won: Best actor for Number One Shakib Khan

Ifad Film Club Awards

- Won: Best Actor Of The Year 2012
- Won: Best Actor and Best Couple Awards – 2017

ATN Bangla Performance Awards

- Won: Best Actor Award – 2017

Diamond World Channel I Best Awards

- Nom: for Best Actor

Film Awards Bangla (FAB 2010)

Also known as West Bangla and East Bangla Film Awards

- Nom: Best Actor for Amar Praner Priya 2009

Showbiz Award 2010

- Won: Best actor for Bhalobashar Lal Golap

4th Cholochitra Mela 2012

- Special award – honoured as New Generation Actors

Bachsas Sammanana-2022

- For outstanding contribution to Bengali cinema.
