= List of Bangladeshi films of 2014 =

This is a list of Bangladeshi films that were released in 2014 in Bangladesh or overseas. A few of the movies are joint ventures.

== January–March ==
Opening		Title	Director	Cast	Genre	Notes	Ref.
J A N	17	Dabang	Azad Khan	Zayed Khan, Bindia, Amit Hasan	Action, romance		
J A N	24	Daag Ei Buker Bhetor	Bazlur Rashed Chowdhury	Jibon Islam, Pina	Action, romance		
J A N	31	Ki Darun Dekhte	Wazed Ali Sumon	Mahiya Mahi, Bappy Chowdhury, Shah Riaz, Misha Sawdagor	Action, romance		
J A N	31	Moner Moddhe Lekha	Mahmud Hossain Murad	Sagor, Shompa, Amit Hasan	Romance		
F E B R U A R Y	7	Tomar Kache Rhini	Shahdat Hossain Liton	Symon Sadik, Toma Mirza, Bobita	Romance, drama		
F E B R U A R Y	14	Agnee	Iftakar Chowdhury	Mahiya Mahi, Arifin Shuvoo, Misha Sawdagor, Ali Raj	Action		
F E B R U A R Y	14	Akash Koto Dure	Samia Zaman	Ongkon, Faria, Razzak, Misha Sawdagor	Romance		
F E B R U A R Y	14	Lobhe Paap, Paape Mrittu	Shohanur Rahman Shohan	Riaz, Purnima, Amin Khan, Nasrin, Sadeq Bacchu	Romance, drama		
F E B R U A R Y	14	Jibondhuli	Tanvir Mokammel	Shatabdi Wadud, Ramendu Majumdar, Wahida Mollick Jolly	Drama, war		
F E B R U A R Y	14	Prem Ki Oporadh	Jadu Azad	Hridoy Chowdhury, Priyanka, Ahmed Sharif	Romance		
F E B R U A R Y	21	Kusumpurer Golpo	Ferdous Wahid	Palash, Moumita, Jasmine	Drama		
F E B R U A R Y	21	Are You Listening!	Kamar Ahmad Simon		Documentary film		
F E B R U A R Y	28	Lattu Koshai	P.A. Kajol	Shakib Khan, Ferdous Ahmed, Monowar Hossain Dipjol, Munmun	Action, drama		
F E B R U A R Y	28	Shima Rekha	Deowan Nazmul	Fahim, Faria, Bobita, Rajatava Datta	Romance	Bangladesh-India; Co-production film	
M A R C H	7	Rajotto	Iftakar Chowdhury	Shakib Khan, Eamin Haque Bobby	Action, romance		
M A R C H	7	Anantakaler - Forever	Masum Aziz	Aysharjyo Birjan, Shuchitra	Romance		
M A R C H	21	1 No. Ashami	Raju Chowdhury	Masum Parvez Rubel, Poly	Action		
M A R C H	21	Toke Valobashtei Hobe	Raju Chowdhury	Zayed Khan, Shahara, Rina Khan	Action, romance		
M A R C H	21	Boishommo - Journey of the heart	Adam Doula	Abir Hossain Ongkon, Adam Doula, Mita Chowdhury	Thriller	Children's film, released on 7 November in India	
M A R C H	28	71 er Shongram	Munsur Ali	Anupam Kher, Asia Argento, Amaan Reza, Dilruba Yasmeen Ruhee	Romance, war		

== April–June ==
Opening		Title	Director	Cast	Genre	Notes	Ref.
A P R I L	4	Dobir Saheber Songsar	Jakir Hossain Raju	Ali Raz, Mahiya Mahi, Bappy Chowdhury	Comedy		
A P R I L	4	Anukrosh	Golam Mostafa Shimul	Pijush Bandyopadhyay, Keramat Mawla, Raisul Islam Ashad, Riaz Mahmud Jewel	Drama, war		
A P R I L	11	Daring Lover	Badiul Alam Khokon	Shakib Khan, Apu Biswas, Misha Sawdagor	Action, romance		
A P R I L	11	Jonakir Alo	Khalid Mahmud Mithu	Mamnun Hasan Emon, Bidya Sinha Mim	Romance		
A P R I L	25	Maa er Momota	Mostafizur Rahman Babu	Mamnun Hasan Emon, Nipun Akter, Suchorita	Romance, drama		
M A Y	2	Jaan	G Sarker	Mamnun Hasan Emon, Bindia, Amaan, Anna	Romance		
M A Y	9	Bhalobasha Express	Shafi Uddin Shafi	Shakib Khan, Apu Biswas, Mim Chowdhury	Romance		
M A Y	16	Ami Shudhu Cheyechi Tomay	Ashok Pati, Anonno Mamun	Ankush Hazra, Subhashree Ganguly, Misha Sawdagor	Action, romance	Bangladesh-India; Co-production film	
M A Y	23	Kacher Shatru	M A Auwal	Amin Khan, Nipun Akter, Shomrat	Action		
M A Y	23	Duti Moner Paglami	Julhash Chowdhury Polash	Nupur, Romeo	Romance		
M A Y	30	Fand - The Trap	Shafi Uddin Shafi	Shakib Khan, Achol, Amit Hasan, Kazi Hayat	Action, romance		
J U N E	6	Shabnam	Shibly Sadique	Mahfuz Ahmed, Moumita Chakraborty			
J U N E	6	Taarkata	Muhammad Mostafa Kamal Raz	Arifin Shuvoo, Bidya Sinha Mim, Moushumi	Crime, thriller		
J U N E	20	Nekabborer Mahaprayan	Masud Pathik	Mamunur Rashid, Prabir Mitra, Shimla, Nirmalendu Goon	Drama	Based on Nirmalendu; Goon's poetry	

== July–September ==
Opening		Title	Director	Cast	Genre	Notes	Ref.
J U L Y	29	Honeymoon	Shafi Uddin Shafi	Bappy Chowdhury, Mahiya Mahi	Romance		
J U L Y	29	Most Welcome 2	Ananta Jalil	Ananta Jalil, Afiea Nusrat Barsha, Shohel Rana	Action, romance		
J U L Y	29	Mukti	P A Kajal	Shoccho, Parveen Sultana Diti, Shohel Rana	Drama	Children's film	
J U L Y	29	Headmaster	Delwar Jahan Jhontu	Alamgir, Suborna Mustafa, Kayes Arju	Drama		
J U L Y	29	Priya Tumi Shukhi Hou	Geetali Hasan	Shaila Shabi, Shohel Rana, Ferdous	Romance		
J U L Y	29	I Don't Care	Mohammad Hossain	Bobby, Bappy Chowdhury	Action, romance		
J U L Y	29	Hero: The Superstar	Badiul Alam Khokon	Shakib Khan, Apu Biswas, Bobby, Bobita, Notun	Action, romance		
A U G U S T	15	Bhalobashar Tajmahal	Ahsanullah Moni	Akash, Hena	Romance		
A U G U S T	22	Kokhono Bhule Jeo Na	Mostafizur Rahman Babu	Mamnun Hasan Emon, Tani, Pushpita			
A U G U S T	22	Adrishyo Shotru	Eiyul Raiyan	Eiyul Raiyan, Shohel Rana, Priya Aman	Action		
A U G U S T	29	Olpo Olpo Premer Golpo	Saniat S Hossain	Niloy Alamgir, Anika Kabir Shokh	Romance, action		
A U G U S T	29	Age Jodi Jantam Tui Hobi Por	Montazur Rahman Akbar	Abhi, Ariyan Shah, Pushpita, Prabir Mitra	Romance		
S E P T E M B E R	5	Love Station	Shahdat Hossain Liton	Bappy Chowdhury, Mishti Jannat, Kazi Hayat, Shahnoor	Romance, action		
S E P T E M B E R	5	Tui Shudhu Amar	Raju Chowdhury	Symon Sadik, Moumita	Action, romance		
S E P T E M B E R	12	Bhalobashle Dosh Ki Tate	Khokon Rizbhi	Nir, Arav Khan, Joy Chowdhury	Romance		
S E P T E M B E R	19	Khov	Shahdat Hossain Liton				
S E P T E M B E R	19	Sedin Brishti Chilo	Shaheen Sumon	Ratna, Sumit (debut)	Horror		
S E P T E M B E R	19	Brihonnola	Murad Parvez	Ferdous Ahmed, Sohana Saba	Drama		

== October–December ==
Opening		Title	Director	Cast	Genre	Notes	Ref.
O C T O B E R	6	Amra Korbo Joy	Ahsan Sorwar	Ahsan Sadaf, Konica	Horror	Children's film	
O C T O B E R	6	Kistimaat	Ashiqur Rahman	Arifin Shuvoo, Achol, Misha Sawdagor	Action, romance		
O C T O B E R	6	Kothin Protishodh	Nazrul Islam Khan	Shakib Khan, Apu Biswas, Misha Sawdagor	Action, romance		
O C T O B E R	6	Hitman	Wazed Ali Sumon	Shakib Khan, Apu Biswas, Sujata, Misha Sawdagor	Action		
O C T O B E R	6	Shera Nayok	Wakil Ahmed	Shakib Khan, Apu Biswas, Misha Sawdagor, Ali Raz	Romance, action		
O C T O B E R	6	Time Machine	Symon Jahan	Ratna, Sourav Sidak, Irene, Modhumoni, Yamin	Fantasy	Children's film	
O C T O B E R	24	Ant Story	Mostofa Sarwar Farooki	Sheena Chohan, Nur Imran Mithu	Comedy, drama		
O C T O B E R	31	Jane Na E Mon	M A Rahim	Mamnun Hasan Emon, Jaanvi	Romance, action		
N O V E M B E R	7	My Name is Simi	Montazur Rahman Akbar	Simi Akter Koli, Zayed Khan, Misha Sawdagor	Action		
N O V E M B E R	7	Horijon	Mirza Shakhwat Hossain	Rokeya Prachi, Jayanta Chattopadhyay, Mamunur Rashid, Arjumand Ara Bokul	Drama		
N O V E M B E R	7	Onek Sadher Moyna	Jakir Hossain Raju	Mahiya Mahi, Bappy Chowdhury, Anisur Rahman Milon	Romance, drama	Remake of MoynaMoti (1969)	
N O V E M B E R	7	Onek Shadhonar Pore	Abul Kalam Azad	Nijhum Rubina, Shanto, Prabir Mitra	Romance, action		
N O V E M B E R	7	Shopno Je Tui	Monirul Islam Shohel	Mamnun Hasan Emon, Achol, Kazi Hayat	Romance		
N O V E M B E R	14	Shorbonasha Ya ba	Kazi Hayat	Kazi Maruf, Prosun Azad, Kazi Hayat	Action, drama		
N O V E M B E R	28	Char Okkhore Bhalobasha	Jakir Khan	Ferdous Ahmed, Popy, Nirab Hossain	Romance		
N O V E M B E R	28	Ek Cup Cha	Naeem Imtiaz Neamul	Mousumi, Ferdous, Rituparna Sengupta, Alamgir, Humayun Faridi, Abdur Razzak	Romance		
D E C E M B E R	5	Prem Korbo Tomar Sathe	Raqibul Alam	Zayed Khan, Zakia Bari Momo, Anisur Rahman Milon	Romance		
D E C E M B E R	12	Meghmallar	Zahidur Rahim Anjan	Shahiduzzaman Selim, Aparna Ghose, Jayanto Chattopadhyay	Drama, war	Based on Akhteruzzaman Elias's short story "Raincoat" about the Bangladesh Liberation War	
D E C E M B E R	12	Shopno Chowa	Shafiq Hasan	Symon Sadik, Bobby	Romance		
D E C E M B E R	12	Hridoye 71	Sadeq Siddiqui	Mamnun Hasan Emon, Romana, Anna			
D E C E M B E R	19	Ekattorer Khudiram	Mannan Hira	Mamunur Rashid, Fazlur Rahman Babu, Momena Chowdhury	Drama	Children's film	
D E C E M B E R	19	Zero Theke Top Hero	Shaheen Sumon	Jeff, Itisha, Sumit	Action		
D E C E M B E R	26	Ekattorer Maa Jononi	Shah Alam Kiran	Nipun Akter, Agun, Gulshan Ara	War, drama	Based on Bangladesh Liberation War	
D E C E M B E R	26	Khoniker Bhalobasha	Abul Kashem Mondol	Shireen Shila, Joy Chowdhury	Romance		
D E C E M B E R	26	Desha: The Leader	Saikat Nasir	Shipan Mitra, Mahiya Mahi, Tariq Anam Khan	Political, thriller		

== See also ==
- List of Bangladeshi films
- Dhallywood
- Cinema of Bangladesh
