= Shakib Khan =

Bangladeshi actor (born 1979)

- শাকিব খান
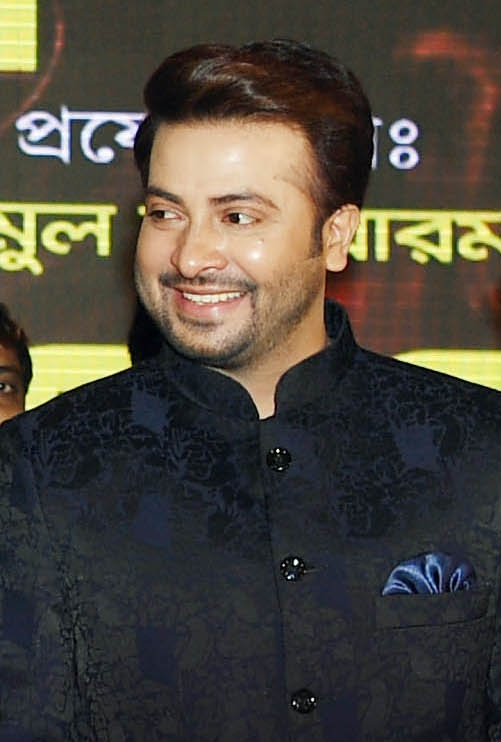
- Khan in 2019
- Born: Masud Rana Sheikh; 28 March 1979 (age 47); Ragadhi, Muksudpur, Gopalganj, Bangladesh
- Occupations: Actor; producer (Note: multiple sources:); businessman; playback singer; film organiser; media personality; youtuber
- Years active: 1999–present
- Organization(s): SK Films, Dhaka Capitals, Remark HB
- Works: Full list
- Spouses: Apu Biswas (m. 2008; div. 2018) (Note: multiple sources:); Shobnom Bubly (m. 2018; sep. 2022) (Note: multiple sources:)
- Children: 3
- Awards: Full list

Masud Rana Sheikh (Note: Bengali: মাসুদ রানা শেখ) (born 28 March 1979), (Note: The Times of India mentions that Khan was born on 28 March 1984.), known professionally as Shakib Khan (Note: Bengali: শাকিব খান, Bengali pronunciation: [ˈʃakib kʰaːn]), is a Bangladeshi actor and filmmaker who works in Bengali-language films. Over a career of about two decades, he has appeared in around 250 films and is often referred to in the media as “King Khan”. He has been described as one of the highest-paid actors in Bangladeshi cinema. (Note: multiple sources:) He made his film debut in 1999 in the action romance Ananta Bhalobasha.

He played lead roles in films including Ajker Dapot, Mayer Jihad, Dujon Dujonar, Porena Chokher Polok, Sobar Upore Prem, Boba Khuni and Juddhe Jabo. His breakthrough came with Shahoshi Manush Chai, which was followed by Ajker Somaj, Noyon Bhora Jol, Palta Akromon, Badha and Khuni Shikder.

From 2006, he appeared in several commercially successful films, including Chachchu, Ek Takar Bou, Mayer Morjada, Rajdhanir Raja, Dadima, Amar Praner Priya, Koti Takar Kabin and Pitar Ason. Priya Amar Priya was reported to be the highest-grossing Bangladeshi film of the 2000s, and Number One Shakib Khan and Bhalobaslei Ghor Bandha Jay Na were also among the decade’s top-grossing films. Following the death of the actor Manna in 2008, Prothom Alo described him as the leading male star of the industry.

He has won four National Film Awards, eight Meril Prothom Alo Awards, three Bachsas Awards and five CJFB Performance Awards. He won his first National Film Award for Best Actor in 2010 for Bhalobaslei Ghor Bandha Jay Na, and later won for Aro Bhalobashbo Tomay (2015) and Swatta (2017).

== Early life ==
Shakib Khan was born on 28 March 1979 as Masud Rana Sheikh in Ragadhi, Muksudpur, Gopalganj, Bangladesh, his original residence. His paternal grandfather was Mominuddin Sheikh. His father, government official Abdur Rauf Sheikh, was one of three sons of Mominuddin and his mother, Nurjahan, is a housewife. He is one of has a two sons of Abdur Rauf Sheikh and a he has a sister. He grew up as a teenager in Narayanganj due to his father's job. His father's job required the family to relocate frequently from one city to another during his school years. He met film choreographer and actor Aziz Reza in 1995, and completed a dancing course under him. He get an offer for film, Sobai To Shukhi Hote Chay directed by Aftab Khan Tulu and got the role due to a dispute of director with actor Shakil Khan. He was a lead actor in his debut with Ananta Bhalobasha (1999) directed by Sohanur Rahman Sohan for a fee of ৳5,000.

== Career ==
=== 1999–2005 ===
Khan first acted in the film Sobaito Sukhi Hote Chay, although his debut film was Ananta Bhalobasha in 1999. The following year he acted in Sobai to Sukhi Hote Chay, which marked as his first appearance on-camera. Following its release, he got a chance opposite the then top actress Shabnur in the Ispahani Arif Jahan's action melodrama Golam (2000). In the same year, he starred performed with Dilara Hanif Purnima and Alexander Bo in the AJ Rana's action Ajker Dapot. At the same time he acted in Delwar Jahan Jhantu's folk fantasy Bishe Bhora Naagin, the first installment of Naagin Universe featuring Munmun, which involving a supernatural theme are stories about shape-shifting serpents or Ichchadhari Naagin that can take human form, which was the first commercial success of his career. Then he performed in romantic drama Dujon Dujonar opposite Sadika Parvin Popy directed by Abu Sayeed Khan, who wrote the story of his first film. On the Eid al-Azha two of films were released, first he teamed up with Master Maker Malek Afsari for the first time in the action Hira Chuni Panna, which created controversy over nudity and vulgarity, which was on March 17 in the year. And second was Mustafizur Rahman Babu's melodrama Janer Jaan with Munmun. His another release of year was Monowar Khokon's action drama Kosom Banglar Mati (transl. I swear by soil of Bengal) with Moyuri and Munmun. He also collaborate with Rituparna Sengupta and Amit Hasan for the first time in FI Manik's action drama Palta Hamla: The Counter Attack. He shared screen with Tamanna and Shahnaz in Motaleb Hossain's action drama Oshantir Agun. The second installment of Naagin Universe featuring Munmun MM Sarkar's folk fantasy Bishakto Naagin was released in November. His last released of the year FI Manik's melodrama Phool Nebo Na Ashru Nebo, co-starring Shabnur and Amin Khan, released on Eid al-Fitr.

In the beginning of 2001, he played in the action drama Kothin Shasti. His second release that year was the action film Ajker Kedar. Later, two of his films, Dushman Daradi and Dui Naagin, were released on Eid al-Adha. In late March, he appeared in the action drama Mejaj Garam. His May released was the action film Himmat, and the action masala Thekao Mastan The actors received critical acclaim for their performances. In June 2001, three of his films including Delwar Jahan Jhantu's with female-centric film Baap Betir Juddho, along with Sadika Parvin Popy, Alamgir and Razzak, Badal Khandkar's action Bishwa Batpar, and Azizur Rahman Buli's romance drama Bondhu Jokhon Shotru were released respectively. His Ispahani Arif Jahan-directed action drama Shikari (Note: One of the two films of the same-name starring Shakib Khan.) released in the following month. In August, three of his films including Monowar Hossain Dipjol-directed action drama film Gono Dushman, alongside Manna for the first time, Sadika Parvin Popy and Monowar Hossain Dipjol himself, Syed Mokhlisur Rahman's action Nater Guru, and Tujammel Haque Bakul's romance Nachnewali, along with Shabnur, were released respectively. His last release of the year was twice, FI Manik's romance drama Shopner Bashor, along with Riaz and Shabnur, his performance won praise from the audience and critics, a song from the film named "Kichu Kichu Manusher Jibone" received massive response from the audience and gained widespread popularity and became all-time hit, MA Rahim's female-centric robbery film Daku Rani, co-starring Sadika Parvin Popy.

He started 2002 with Enayet Karim's action Juddhe Jabo, Shahidul Alam Khokon's action drama Mukhoshdhaari, which written by National Film Award-winning director Kazi Morshed, co-starring Masum Parvez Rubel, Humayun Faridi and Sadika Parvin Popy and Helal Khan-production action romance Juari, directed by AQ Khokon, along with Helal Khan himself and Sadika Parvin Popy. Helal Khan won the National Film Award for Best Actor in Negative Role for the film. His three more films were released in February, which are Anwar Chowdhury Jibon's action Pagla Baba, action drama Boba Khuni, directed by Shahadat Hossain Badshah, (Note: credited as Badshah Bhai) and PA Kajol's action drama Vondo Ojha. His two films also released in April with a break in March. One is Ahmed Nasir's Uttejito and another one is Aziz Mohammad Bhai-produced Bhoyonkor Porinam, directed by Mustafizur Rahman Babu. The following month, he paired up with Dilara Hanif Purnima and Humayun Faridi in Abu Sufian's action Hingshar Poton. He teamed up with Enayet Karim with action drama Lohar Shikol in July. He appeared another female-centric with Munmun in action Kholnayika, and shared screen with Moushumi for the first time in FI Manik's family-drama Strir Morjada, played as a police officer in August. In September, his three films were released, they are Abu Musa Debu's drama Mayer Jihad, Shawkat Jamil's action Dassu and romance comedy Porena Chokher Palak with Ratna Kabir Sweety directed Mohammad Hannan respectively. His next month released was twice, Azadi Hasnat Firoz's romance Sobar Upore Prem, co-starring Shabnur and Ferdous Ahmed and Enayet Karim's action Moron Nishan. Shahadat Hossain Liton's action O Priya Tumi Kothay, which named after a song of the same name sung by Asif Akbar, was his last film of the year with a break in November.

In 2003, he starred in Sahoshi Manush Chai, Praner Manush, Kkhmotar Dapot and Sobar Upore Prem. The film Sahoshi Manush Chai directed by Muhammad Hannan, which was highly acclaimed by the critics and audience and won the National Film Awards in two categories.

In 2004, he starred in Noyon Bhora Jol, Ajker Somaj, Bostir Rani Suriya, Rukhe Darao and Noshto. On Eid al-Fitr three of his films were released among them Monwar Hossain Khokon's biographical crime thriller film Khuni Shikder. The film is based on the biography of the Bangladeshi notorious murderer Ershad Sikder. In which he played as Shahjahan Shikder, who became a psycho after the death of his mother and then started killing one after another and subsequently he became the country's top terrorist and serial killer. Although the film has been criticised at various times for its obscenity, it has been acclaimed as one of the best performances of his career. Then two of his films Mustafizur Rahman Babu's Jaat Shotru and Montazur Rahman Akbar's lady action based film Bostir Rani Suriya were released simultaneously. In 2005, the Bangladesh Film Censor Board permanently revoked his Bostir Rani Suriya's license and banned its screening throughout Bangladesh. Although, the film was a commercial success and declared as a super hit at the box office. Action-romantic film Noshto directed by Shahin-Sumon duo, which was the first collaboration between Khan with director.

In 2005, he acted in Durdhorsho. His next project was released in April, which was the action drama Bad Son. His third project release in May which was the action-drama Top Leader. His next was the action-drama Nogno Hamla which was released in June of that year. Then on 1 July, two of his films, Nikhoj Songbad and Amar Shopno Tumi released simultaneously. Then he starred in City Terror directed by MA Rahim, where he first time performed with veteran actor Manna. In August two of his films were release, where he played opposite Purnima in Shuva directed by Chashi Nazrul Islam, based on the short story Shuva by Biswakabi Rabindranath Tagore. The film received highly positive reviews from critics as well as his performance. For the film, he was nominated in the Lux-Channel I Performance Awards for Best Film Actor in both of people choice and the critics choice category in 2007. The film added a new dimension to Khan's image as a commercial film star. And second one is Dui Number opposite Neha, under the direction of Shahin-Sumon, in their third collaboration. He also starred with Riaz and Purnima in the film of Badha under the same direction, in their fourth collaboration. His last release of the year was Lalu Kosai, directed by Shahadat Hossain Liton, opposite Sahara.

=== 2006–2010 ===
In 2006, thirteen of his films were released and all of the films were commercially successful films and became the best-selling films of the year. As a result of this success, his salary increased from three lakhs to six-seven lakhs. In the beginning of the year he performed in the Dilip Biswas's action-drama Mayer Morjada, which features an ensemble cast that includes Manna, Moushumi, Shabnur, Babita, Sohel Rana and Humayun Faridi. His next release was Shahin-Sumon's action based Hotline, in their fifth collaboration, opposite Ratna Kabir Sweety. Then he starred in Hasibul Islam Mizan's romance film Jonmo, in their second collaboration, opposite Shabnur and Jona. In May his twice release, in the film FI Manik's action-drama Koti Takar Kabin, his ex-wife Apu Biswas first time performed opposite him, which was also an ensemble cast including that Razzak, Farooque, Monowar Hossain Dipjol, Shuchorita, Misha Sawdagor and Sadek Bachchu. The film was a commercial success and first ever pairing of Khan-Biswas gained massive popularity as a duo. His second release of this month was Shafi-Iqbal's action film Saat Khoon Maaf with Amin Khan and Nodi. His sixth release of the year was FI Manik's family drama based Pitar Ason opposite Apu Biswas and Nipun Akter (in her debut), which was also ensemble cast starred with Amin Khan, Razzak, Shuchorita, Ali Raj, Kazi Hayat and Monowar Hossain Dipjol. The film has been selected for preservation at the Bangladesh Film Archive. In August, three of his films were released in succession. They're Azadi Hasanat Firoz's folk fantasy Rosher Baidani opposite Shabnur, Badiul Alam Khokon's action film Hingsro Manab opposite Nira and FI Manik's family drama Chachchu, opposite Apu Biswas and Prarthana Fardin Dighi. It was a commercial success at the box office and Dighi gained widespread popularity. In October, his twice release, they're Badiul Alam Khokon's action film Nashpap Koyedi opposite Shaila and Uttam Akash's romance film Dhakaiya Pola Barishailla Maiya opposite Shabnur, which was made in the regional languages with Dhakaiya and Barishailla. In November, he starred Shahadat Hossain Liton's in romantic-action Noshto Chhatra with Sahara and Misha Sawdagor. Then his last release of the year was collaboration with FI Manik in action drama Dadima, which marked his 100th film.

In 2007, his 13 films have been released this year as well. All of his films except Kopal have been commercially successful and become super-hit at the box office as like previous year. In the beginning of the year, he starred in Shahin-Sumon action project Jomoj, in their sixth collaboration, opposite Sadika Parvin Popy, where Khan played dual roles for the first time, which performed average at box office. In July his twice film release, Jakir Hossain Raju's drama Shamir Songsar with Apu Biswas, Sohel Rana and Bobita. and Azizur Rahman's comedy based Doctor Bari features an ensemble cast including Jona, Shabnaz and ATM Shamsuzzaman. Then he starred in P.A. Kajal's drama film Amar Praner Swami. The film is the only bumper hit at the box office and became the highest grossing Bangladeshi film of 2007. After the success of the film at the box office, his salary increased to 12 lakhs, which was the highest remuneration in the history of the country at that time. In which Khan played as a defiant man, which earned him Meril-Prothom Alo Critics Choic Award for Best Actor for the first time and Uttam Akash's romantic tragic Tui Jodi Amar Hoiti Re, where Khan paired with Moushumi for the first time. On 14 October, his five films were released on the same day, respectively they are, Uttam Akash's another action Danab Shantan opposite Sadika Parvin Popy, which performed average at box office. Jakir Hossain Raju's drama Maa Amar Shorgo with Purnima and Bobita, Sohanur Rahman Sohan's romance film Kotha Dao Sathi Hobe opposite Apu Biswas, which was the second collaboration between Khan and the director, Shafi-Iqbal's romance based Tomar Jonno Morte Pari opposite Apu Biswas Hasibul Islam Mizan's last project romantic tragic Kopal, collaborate with Mahfuz Ahmed, Shabnur, Mridula Ahmed Racy, which was failure at box office. In the last month, his 3 more films were released. They are respectively, MB Manik's romantic Kothin Prem opposite Shabnur, Shahin-Sumon's action dtama Ek Buk Jala with Moushumi and Ferdous Ahmed and Shahadat Hossain Liton's romantic Kabinnama opposite Apu Biswas.

In 2008, Khan also starred in 16 films, which is the third highest number of release in a calendar year in his career. His first release was Wazed Ali Bablu's action project Rajdhanir Raja opposite Sabrina Sultana Keya. His next release was Mohammad Hannan's romance based Tip Tip Brishti opposite Shabnur. In April, he starred in three films, respectively they're, Wakil Ahmed's romantic action Bhalobashar Dushman with Manna and Shabnur, Shahin-Sumon's romantic melodrama Sontan Amar Ohongkar opposite Apu Biswas and Ratna Kabir Sweety and Shahadat Hossain Liton's romance film Tumi Shopno Tumi Shadhona, also opposite Apu Biswas. Then in May, he starred with Abdur Razzak and Dilara Hanif Purnima in FI Manik's romance Biyer Prostab. His next project was Badiul Alam Khokon's romantic action Priya Amar Priya, in which he played as a college student with careless attitude opposite Sahara. Khan's dialogue and the use of the phrase which translates to "Many commissioners will come and go in the city but Hridoy will stay here. I'm local here... lo..ccal" were popular with audiences. After the release of the film, Khan gained widespread fame shortly and gained a large number of fan following. Not only that, Sahara also became an overnight star by acting opposite Khan. Also Khan's remuneration increased to 20 times. He won numerous awards including Meril Prothom Alo Awards, Lux-Channel I Performance Awards and CJFB Performance Awards for Best Actor. The film all-time blockbuster at the box office with grossed ৳150 million at the box office, which is the second-highest grossing in the history of Bangladeshi cinema. On 2 October, his five films were released on the same day, respectively they are, FI Manik's romantic drama Amader Choto Saheb opposite Apu Biswas and Sahara, romance Jodi Bou Saajo Go, which also directed by FI Manik, earned him Bachsas Awards for Best Actor Jakir Hossain Raju's romance Mone Prane Acho Tumi, which performed well and become bumper-hit at the box office, another romance project Hridoy Amar Naam directed by Monowar Khokon with his first actress Erin Zaman, which is their second collaboration and P.A. Kajal's romantic melodrama Ek Takar Bou with Nayak Raj Razzak, Shabnur and Rumana Khan. The film commercially success at the box office and won several accolades, including twice National Film Awards, a Meril-Prothom Alo Awards and his Dhallywood Film and Music Awards as Best Actor. In the last month of the year, four of his films were released simultaneously. They're respectively, Shahin-Sumon's romance Tumi Amar Prem with Apu Biswas, Sohanur Rahman Sohan's third collaboration romance film Amar Jaan Amar Pran, Shahadat Hossain Liton's romance Tomake Bou Banabo with Shabnur and Nayak Raj Razzak, and Shahin Sumon's romance Samadhi (Coloured) with Shabnur and Amin Khan.

In 2009, his 17 films were released of this year as well, which is the highest number of his career. His first release of the year was Shahadat Hossain Liton's melodrama Miah Barir Chakar with Apu Biswas, Abdur Razzak and Humayun Faridi. His next release was Shahin-Sumon's romantic action Jonmo Tomar Jonno opposite Apu Biswas. His next collaboration with Shah Mohammad Sangram in romance Bolbo Kotha Bashor Ghore with Shabnur and Sahara. The film received positive reviews from critics and performed well at the box office. In June, his release twice, they are Shahin-Sumon's romance comedy Biye Bari with Rumana Khan and Nayak Raj Razzak and M B Manik's action Prem Koyedi with Sahara. In July also release twice, they are, Shahin-Sumon's melodrama Mon Jekhane Hridoy Sekhane with Apu Biswas, Nirab Hossain and Ratna Kabir Sweety. and PA Kajal's romance Swami Strir Wada with Shabnur and Romana Khan. The film received positive reviews from the audience and the critics and won National Film Awards thrice. On 21 September, his five films were released on the same day, respectively they are, M B Manik's romance Jaan Amar Jaan, another Shafi-Iqbal's romance O Saathi Re, Shahadat Hossain Liton's romance comedy Bolona Kobul,| FI Manik's melodrama Mayer Hater Beheshter Chabi with Apu Biswas, Monowar Hossain Dipjol and Anwara and Raju Chowdhury's family drama Shaheb Name Golam features an ensemble cast including Moushumi, Sahara, Nirab Hossain, Mridula Ahmed Racy. He later collaborate with Mohammad Hossain Jammy in romance Bhalobashar Laal Golap with Apu Biswas and Purnima. In the last month of the year his four films were release as well, they're respectively, romantic drama Sobar Upore Tumi directed by FI Manik, where he performed for the first time in the Indo-Bangladesh joint production. It was for the first time that Indian actress Swastika Mukherjee was seen opposite him. The film was released in West Bengal, India the following year as the title of Amar Bhai Amar Bon. Almost seven years later, on 6 March 2017, the film was released in Hindi as Hello Zindagi under the banner of Angel Digital. Uttam Akash's romance Bhalobasha Dibi Kina Bol, Shahin-Sumon's action thriller Mone Boro Koshto with Apu Biswas, Sabrina Sultana Keya and Nrab Hossain and Jakir Hossain Raju's ninth project and fourth collaboration romance Amar Praner Priya opposite Bidya Sinha Saha Mim, which performed well at the box-office and became of the successful film in 2009 in Bangladesh, primarily noted for its soundtrack & choreography. The film all the song were popular and became hit with audience as well song "Ki Jadu Korecho Bolona" was on the hit song listed for a year. It won a National Film Awards and was nominated in some categories in Meril Prothom Alo Awards including his Best Actor nomination as well as earned him CJFB Performance Awards.

The following year, in 2010, he starred in Bolona Tumi Amar, Prem Mane Naa Badha, Top Hero, Takar Cheye Prem Boro, Jibon Moroner Saathi, Preme Porechi, Chehara: Vondo–2, Premik Purush, Jibon Moroner Saathi directed by Shahadat Hossain Liton and Hay Prem Hay Bhalobasha. He played the role of Surjo, an independent young man in the romantic revenge film Bhalobaslei Ghor Bandha Jay Na directed by Jakir Hossain Raju opposite Apu Biswas and Rumana Khan. The film was highly successful, critically and commercially and become the second highest-grossing film of 2010 after Number One Shakib Khan. It won numerous accolades including seven National Film Awards, five Bachsas Awards and two Meril Prothom Alo Awards as well as a nomination and Khan was awarded Meril Prothom Alo Awards and National Film Awards for the first time. In this year in Eid-al Fitr, he also starred in Number One Shakib Khan, Chachchu Amar Chachchu and Nissash Amar Tumi. The film Number One Shakib Khan directed by Badiul Alam Khokon, gained commercially success at the box office and widespread popularity. He won numerous accolades for the film including Binodon Bichitra Awards 2010, Uro-CJFB Performance Awards 2010, Walton Boishakhi Star Awards 2011 and Babisas Awards 2010. In Chachchu Amar Chachchu directed by PA Kajal played as Chachchu (transl. Uncle) opposite Prarthana Fardin Dighi as niece, which was earned her third National Film Awards as Best Child Artist and Nissash Amar Tumi directed by Badiul Alam Khokon was a hit at the box-office and was one of the highest grossing of 2010. It won twice National Film Awards. in all three films Apu Biswas starring opposite him. All the three films received National Film Awards in various categories. He reunited with Sohanur Rahman Sohan in romance Poran Jai Jolia Re, with an ensemble cast including Dilara Hanif Purnima, Rumana Khan, Nasima Akter Nodi, ATM Shamsuzzaman and Misha Sawdagor, which was one of the commercial successful films of the year.

=== 2011–2015 ===
"There is quite a hype created by Bollywood actors with their polished look and six-pack abs. Therefore, our audience are also demanding the same from the actors of this country. I respect their wishes and therefore, I am concentrating on making my body more slim and maintained."

— Khan about his character in films in an interview with Dhaka Tribune.

In 2011, Khan starred in Koti Takar Prem directed by Sohanur Rahman Sohan. In Moner Jala directed by Malek Afsari starring Apu Biswas opposite him, he also sung a song in the film for the first time as a playback singer titled "Ami Chok Tule Takalei Surjo Lukay". King Khan directed by Mohammad Hussain Jammy starring Apu Biswas and Lamia Mimo opposite him, it is becoming the most successful film in the year and he won Meril Prothom Alo Awards and CJFB Performance Awards for Best Actor. He was nominated for the Best Actor in the critics' choice category at the Meril Prothom Alo Awards for his performance in the comedy-drama film Adorer Jamai opposite Apu Biswas directed by Shahadat Hossain Liton. In Eid al-fitr of the year, he starred in Tiger Number One directed by Shahin-Sumon and has played for the first time as negative role. According to Orchi Othondrila, mainstream Bangladeshi films are "always based on a central hero while female characters are there as objects to complement [the] hero's actions." She wrote that, as with many other Shakib Khan film titles, the title Tiger Number One implies "that the stories are solely depended on the hero who is the centre of the actions." Boss Number One directed by Mohammad Hossain and Matir Thikana directed by Shah Alam Kiran won the National Film Awards and the Meril Prothom Alo Awards in various categories through starring by him. In this year, he also appeared in a guest role in the film of Ke Apon Ke Por directed by Shahin–Sumon.

In 2012, he starred in I Love You, Se Amar Mon Kereche, 100% Love: Buk Fatey To Mukh Foteyna, Ek Takar Denmohor, My Name Is Sultan, Don Number One, Khodar Pore Ma and Dhakar King. He won Meril Prothom Alo Awards for Best Actor in the critics' choice category through starring in Don Number One directed by Badiul Alam Khokon opposite Shahara in 2013, which is the remake of Telugu-language film Don (2007) directed by Raghava Lawrence, starring himself along with Nagarjuna and Anushka Shetty. In 100% Love: Buk Fatey To Mukh Futeyna he starred opposite Apu Biswas and Rumana Khan, which is a remake of 2010 Telugu film Brindavanam directed by Vamsi Paidipally starring NTR Jr., Kajal Agarwal and Samantha Ruth Prabhu. The film opened very well at the box office and was declared a super-hit and become one of the highest-grossing films of 2012. He also starred in Khodar Pore Ma opposite Shahara directed by Shahin–Sumon duo, and played as the role of Munna and veteran actress Bobita also played as the role of his mother. The film received positive reviews and declared as a super-hit and become the highest-grossing film of 2012 and received several National Film Awards including his second National Award for Best Actor at the 37th National Film Awards in 2014 for his performance in the film. Besides in this year, Khan, who holds a record number of remuneration, made the latest surprise by being elected president of the Bangladesh Film Artists Association.

In the beginning of the following year, he starred in romantic drama film Devdas, which is based on the famous novel Devdas, written by the untouchable novelist Sharat Chandra Chattopadhyay. The film is set in the early 1900s and follows Khan as Devdas Mukherjee, a wealthy law graduate who returns from Calcutta after 13 years to marry his childhood sweetheart, Paro, played by Apu Biswas. However, the rejection of this marriage by his own family sparks his descent into alcoholism, causing his emotional deterioration and him seeking refuge with a courtesan, Chandramukhi, played by Moushumi. The film directed by veteran director Chashi Nazrul Islam and remade of the same director's film Devdas in 1982. It received positive response from critics and a good opening at the box office, and won several awards in 38th National Film Awards and nominated one category in 16th Meril-Prothom Alo Awards. Then Purnima played opposite him in Judge Barrister Police Commissioner directed by FI Manik. After 35 years the three Bangladeshi popular stars Razzak, Sohel Rana and Alamgir played with together in the film. It is also becoming success at the box office and praised by the critics. He also played titular role in Nishpap Munna, directed by Badiul Alam Khokon. The film was received mixed reviews and earn huge success in box office. Then he work with same director's romantic action film My Name Is Khan opposite Apu Biswas. The film also received mixed reviews from critics. Despite this, the film become commercially success at the box office and becoming one of the highest-grossing film of 2013 in Bangladesh. In the same year, Mahiya Mahi starring opposite him in the film Bhalobasha Aaj Kal directed by PA Kajal. It was the first collaboration between Khan and Jaaz Multimedia and between Khan and Mahiya Mahi. The film received mostly positive reviews from critics and declared as a superhit at the box office, and was also highest-grossing film of Jaaz Multimedia production until Shikari (2016) released. Also that year, he starred in Dhaka to Bombay directed by Uttam Akash. The film received negative reviews and failed at the box office. In the end of the year, he starred in his 200th film Purno Doirgho Prem Kahini directed by Shafi Uddin Shafi, in which Jaya Ahsan and Arifin Shuvoo performed opposite him. He sang a song for the second time in the film as a playback singer titled "O Priyo Ami Tumar Hote Chai". The film opened to critical success and earned numerous accolades. It received six Meril Prothom Alo Awards nominations, with Khan winning Best Actor for his portrayal of Joy Shikder. The film had the longest theatrical run in 2013, completing over 100 days at the box office. The film was a blockbuster at the box office and becoming one of the highest-grossing film of 2013. After the film's commercially success, a sequel titled Purno Doirgho Prem Kahini 2 released in 2016. He starred in Malek Afsari's 22nd project crime thriller Full and Final as IPS Romeo opposite Bobby Hoque, collaboration between first time. The film well performed at the box office and become super hit and received mixed reviews from critics. Zia Nazmul Islam of The Daily Star claimed that, "Shakib Khan plays his role with his usual Shakib-style. He couldn't bring anything new to the table." He also noted, "Considering all factors, Full and Final is made to benefit from Shakib Khan's popularity and Bobby's attractiveness." He also starred in an ensemble cast venture Rakibul Islam Rakib's romantic drama Premik Number One. The film released to positive reviews and performed well at the box office. Adnan Ahmed wrote in The Daily Star that, "Once again we see Shakib Khan donning the charming lover boy character, he has made the genre his own".

In the beginning of 2014, he starred in P.A. Kajal's action Lattu Koshai with Ferdous Ahmed and Monowar Hossain Dipjol, which was a box office bomb. His second release of the year was Iftekhar Chowdhury's fourth directorial venture crime thriller Rajotto, opposite Bobby Hoque, in which he played a gangster. It was the first collaboration between Khan and Iftekhar Chowdhury. The film turned out be hit and received critically positive reviews and his performance was highly praised by the critics. Syed Nazmus Sakib of Bangla Movie Database claimed that "He has dragged the whole film alone." He also noted, "There are so many flaws and deviations in the whole film - it can be forgiven only because of the performance of one person - he is Shakib Khan." He performed in Badiul Alam Khokon's Daring Lover as Raja. The film remade of 2006 Boopathy Pandian's comedy-drama film Thiruvilaiyaadal Aarambam. The film received massive response and is said to contribute to record breaking sales in some renowned theaters. In the beginning of May, he teamed up Shafi Uddin Shafi in romantic drama Bhalobasha Express. In late May, he once again teamed up with Shafi Uddin Shafi in action drama Faand: The Trap featuring first collaboration with Achol. Although the film has been discussed throughout the year, but was failed commercially at the box office. Then he founded his own production company SK Films and produced the film of Hero: The Superstar directed by Badiul Alam Khokon under the banner of his company, where he played dual roles and Apu Biswas, Bobby, Bobita and Nuton played with him. The film was released in 120 theatres on the occasion of Eid al-Fitr, which was a record number at the time. It achieved huge commercial success at the box office. The film received positive reviews from critics and his performance also praised by the critics. Abdullah Al Amin (Rubel) of The Daily Star noted that "Shakib Khan has done yet another great job in upholding his character in the movie. Hero the Superstar is all about the Hero himself, Shakib Khan. He portrayed both characters perfectly." For the film he won the Meril Prothom Alo Awards for Best Actor in 2015. Three of his films were released on Eid al-Fitr, all of which were successful at the box office. First one is Wajed Ali Sumon's first solo directorial Hitman, which was an official remake of Tamil language film Vettai (2012). The film received mixed reviews and face various criticism, although it became highest grosser of 2014. The Nazrul Islam Khan's action drama Kothin Protishodh was the second most commercially successful film of the year. Another Eid venture was Wakil Ahmed's romantic action Shera Nayok became the third commercial success of 2014 with 50 percent collection at the box office. He also played a guest role in Ek Cup Cha produced by actor Ferdous Ahmed and Dobir Saheber Songsar directed by Jakir Hossain Raju.

In 2015, he starred in Sohail Arman's first project romantic war-based drama film Eito Prem opposite Afsana Ara Bindu for the first time. The film performed well in box office and received mixed reviews from critics. He was nominated in the Meril Prothom Alo Awards for Best Actor in 2016. He starred in Aro Bhalobashbo Tomay directed by SA Haque Alik opposite Pori Moni and won the National Film Awards for Best Actor for the third time in his career for his role in the film as himself. It received positive reviews from critics, and considering its budget the film had commercial success at the box office. His next project FI Manik's Dui Prithibi was released before Eid al-Fitr of this year. In Eid al-Fitr of the year, he starred in Shahin Sumon's project Love Marriage. The film open to a good at box office and received positive reviews from and his performance, especially his Dakaiya accent is highly praised by the critics. Mohaiminul Islam of The Daily Star noted that, "The movie is a solid source of entertainment with Shakib Khan adorned in traditional white Punjabi, lungi and his flawless Dhakaiya accent. His talent as an actor shines through, despite the absurdity of some sequences like using a helicopter to travel to Shyamoli from Old Dhaka." Tanvir Tareq also noted on The Daily Ittefaq "Especially after the entry of Shakib Khan, the way in which he has been performing impeccably in pure Dhakaiya accent, his performance is to be commended." His next project romantic action film Rajababu: The Power directed by Badiul Alam Khokon was released in Eid al-Adha. Where he played as titular role opposite Apu Biswas and Bobby. The film was released in more than 152 theaters, which was a record number for any Bangladeshi film at that time. The film was successful at the box office and has received critical acclaimed.

=== 2016–2020 ===
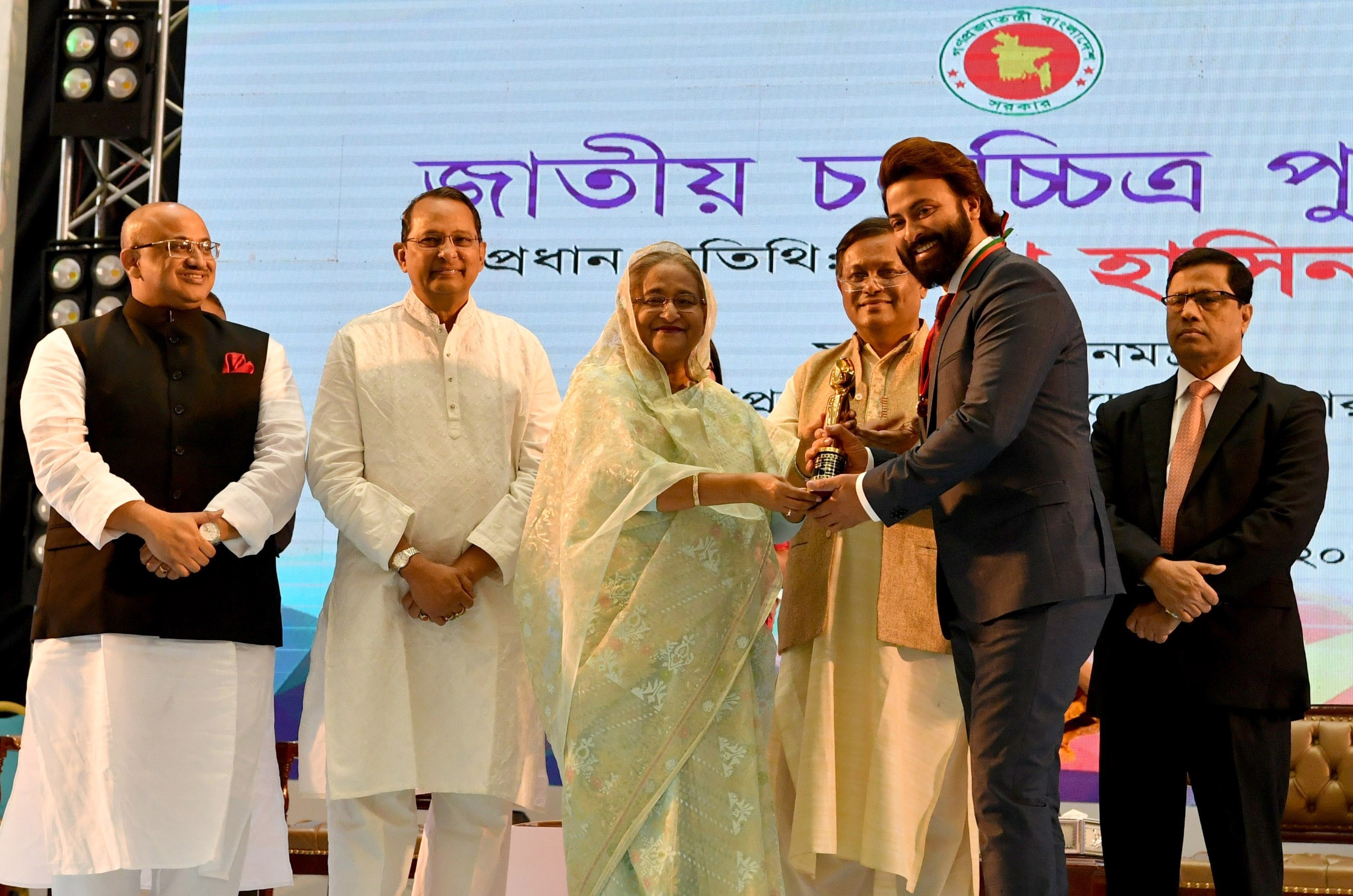
Shakib Khan receives National Film Award in 2019.

At the beginning of 2016, he collaborate with Uttam Akash in comedy Raja 420, in which he played a con artist. In April the same year, he starred in Purno Doirgho Prem Kahini 2 playing the role of a cricketer. Also in 2016, three of his films released simultaneously, Shikari, Mental and Samraat: The King Is Here. He won the Meril Prothom Alo Awards and the Tele Cine Awards for Best Actor for his starring role. His next project is psychological thriller film Mental directed by Shamim Ahamed Roni starring Nusrat Imrose Tisha first time opposite him, Achol and Sabrina Porshi also seen with his. Its story is loosely inspired from the Christopher Nolan's film Memento. Although the film is criticised for various reasons. The film was later dubbed in Hindi, which was unveiled on the Bongo India YouTube channel in mid-August 2021. His next project was Mohammad Mostafa Kamal Raz's crime thriller Samraat: The King Is Here, in which he played a leader of a Malaysia-based Bangladeshi organised crime syndicate, where he performed with Apu Biswas, which is their 72nd film as duo, Misha Sawdagor and Indian actor Indraneil Sengupta. On the same year in Eid al-Adha, he starred in two films. One of which is Shamim Ahamed Roni's action film Bossgiri opposite Shabnom Bubly, which is her debut film. Zahid Akbar of The Daily Star praised his performance, specifically his Dhakaiya accent. He noted, "There were some highlights in the film such as Shakib Khan's delivery of the Dhakaiya accent, which was fairly entertaining. Shakib Khan's presence is the only saving grace in the entire film." The film won three awards in the 19th Meril Prothom Alo Awards. Another was Raju Chowdhury's action crime film Shooter. The film was a commercial success at the box office, placed among the top 10 commercially successful films of 2016 but received negative reviews from critics for the poor screenplay, but praised his performance. Film director Mostafizur Rahman Manik noted on Bangla Tribune that, "Shakib Khan is as good as ever in terms of acting". In December of the same year, he starred in Dhumketu directed by Shafique Hasan opposite Pori Moni. Zahid Akbar has criticized his costume and hairstyles in the film. He noted, "Shakib Khan was not too bad. However, it was clear that he was shooting for a long time. There was no continuity in costume and haircut. He appeared in one scene with big hair, but in the next scene appeared in short hair, which has caused a lot of annoyance."

In the beginning of 2017, he starred in Swatta. The film directed by Hashibur Reza Kallol based on the story of fictionist Sohani Hossain's Maa (transl. Mother) and for the first time Indian actress Paoli Dam played opposite him. His performance in the film caught the attention of the audience of all the classes, the film also success at the box office. At Risingbd.com, Ruhul Amin appreciated that it was a good idea to start a story with a mainstream hero. He noted, "Sabuj means that Shakib Khan also made one of the best performances of his acting career in Swatta". However, he criticized Khan's early performance in the film. It won numerous accolades including five National Film Awards at the 42nd Bangladesh National Film Awards and Khan won the National Film Awards as Best Actor for the fourth time by playing Sabuj, a drug-addicted perverted young man. The same year in Eid al-Fitr Nabab and Rajneeti released starring by him. Indo-Bangladesh joint production Nabab directed by Joydeep Mukherjee and for the first time, Indian actress Subhashree Ganguly played opposite him. The film was released in 128 theatres, and become the highest-grossing films of 2017 and become one of the highest grossing Bangladeshi and West Bengal film of all time. His energetic performance and re-emergence in the film was praised by both critics and audiences. Film critic Zahid Akbar noted on The Daily Star, "From the beginning of the film to the end, Shakib has tried to pour all his talent. He was the Nawab throughout the whole story". His dialogue and the use of the phrase of the film "সন্ত্রাসের কোনো জাত নেই, দেশ নেই, ধর্ম নেই, ওদের পরিচয় একটাই, ওরা সন্ত্রাসবাদী।" (transl. There is no caste of terrorism, no country, no religion, their only identity is that they are terrorists.) were very popular with audiences. On the other, Rajneeti, directed by Bulbul Biswas, after a long time, he is seen opposite Apu Biswas. Rayan Khan, the film critic of the Bangla Tribune, stated "From the beginning to the end of the film he is unrivalled in acting. His eye expression is incomparable. Shakib Khan's look was not in continuity, even though the other actors of the film were look continuity". In Eid al-Adha, he starred in Rangbaaz and Ohongkar. Shabnom Bubly was the opposite in this twice films.

In the beginning of the following year, he starred in political drama film Ami Neta Hobo, where Bidya Sinha Saha Mim starred opposite him for the second time after the release of Amar Praner Priya. The film is co-produced by Eskay Movies with Shapla Media of Bangladesh. Then in April he starred in romantic comedy film Chalbaaz directed by Joydeep Mukherjee, which is the remake of 2015's Telugu language action comedy-drama film Subramanyam for Sale starring by Sai Dharam Tej and Regina Cassandra. It was first Indian solo production film starring by him, which was produced by Indian production company Eskay Movies. Subhashree Ganguly starred opposite him in the film, where he is seen with actors like Rajatava Dutta, Kharaj Mukherjee, Kazi Hayat and Ashish Vidyarthi. It received positive reviews from critics after its release. Anindo Mamun praised Shakib Khan's performance, especially his comedy. Mamun noted on Jugantor that, "Shakib Khan also tried to give the best. His comedy acting was also great. In return he is getting applause from the audience". Three of his films were released on Eid al-Fitr of this year, in Abdul Mannan's comedy-drama Panku Jamai, he played a stylish son-in-law opposite Apu Biswas, which is their final collaboration as a duo. The film received negative reviews from critics, but earned praised for his performance. National award-winning director Chatku Ahmed described to him as "the soul of Bangladesh cinema" for the performance in the film. In Uttam Akash's regional-comedy Chittagainga Powa Noakhailla Maiya, he played as independent protestor opposite Shobnom Bubly, which was made in the regional languages of Chittagong and Noakhali. Then he starred in director Ashiqur Rahman's fifth project action-crime film Super Hero. He played as Iqbal Mahmud Sami, a special force officer. The film created many controversy for various reasons, from filming to release. His next venture is Indian action comedy-drama film Bhaijaan Elo Re, which was also directed by Joydeep Mukherjee. He has played dual roles opposite Srabanti Chatterjee and Payal Sarkar in the film. On the same year in Eid-ul-Adha, he starred in Captain Khan directed by Wajed Ali Sumon as the titular role. The film remake of Tamil action thriller film Anjaan starring by Suriya and Samantha Ruth Prabhu. At the end of the year, he starred in Indian supernatural thriller film Naqaab of Shree Venkatesh Films, whice is directed by Rajiv Kumar Biswas. Where he played dual roles opposite Nusrat Jahan and Sayantika Banerjee.

In Eid al-Fitr of 2019, he starred in Password and Nolok. The film Password was released in highest number of theaters of the year. It was commercially success in spite of various criticisms, including accusations of plagiarism, theft of song lyrics, not giving time to other film promote. The film grossed ৳110 million on its fourth day at the box office, which is the fourth-highest grossing in the history of Bangladeshi cinema and become highest-grossing film of the year. The film won the highest number of awards including Best Popular Actor in the first Bharat-Bangladesh Film Awards held in Bangladesh. Romantic comedy-drama film Nolok directed by Sakib Sonnet and Team. (Note: Rashed Raha has directed 85% work of the film and the rest work of the film is directed by Iftekhar Chowdhury. However, it was release clearance by the Bangladesh Film Censor Board in the name of Sakib Sonnet and Team.) He played as Shaon Talukder opposite Bobby. The film won in a category award at the Bharat-Bangladesh Film Awards and nominated in several categories. On the same year in Eid al-Adha he starred in Jakir Hossain Raju's 20th project Moner Moto Manush Pailam Naa, which was the seventh collaboration between Jakir Hossain Raju and him. In which he played as Shadhin, an independent lawyer, he played the role for the second time in his career. Earlier, he played Advocate Murad as a lawyer in Humkir Mukhe (হুমকির মুখে) directed by Aziz Ahmed Babul opposite actress Eka in 2003. The film performed average at the box office and received mixed reviews from critics upon release but Khan's performance in the film was highly praised by critics. Rumman Rashid Khan on Bangla Movie Database wrote that, he has done justice to his name. Rumman noted, "Shakib Khan has been able to do justice to his name in the film. Not with the body, he has performed in several scenes of the film with his eye expression. Shakib Khan's performance while talking to his parents about flashbacks has made me repeatedly wondered that why he is the best." It won several National Film Awards at the 44th National Film Awards including Jakir Hossain Raju's Best Dialogue Award.

In 2020, he starred in Bir and Shahenshah. In the Kazi Hayat's fiftieth directorial socio-political Bir, he played a defiant youth, who works as a professional assassin for a politician. The film marks the first collaboration between Khan and Kazi Hayat. The film is produced by himself, which is his third production, he has previously produced two films titled Hero: The Superstar (2014) and Password (2019). The film story, dialogue and Khan's performance praised by the critics. Zahid Akbar noted on The Daily Star, "The audience has seen Bir to see Shakib Khan's performance. Throughout the film he has acted in heroic". The film won National Film Awards twice at the 45th National Film Awards. He played titular role in the Shamim Ahamed Roni's fifth directorial venture action-masala Shahenshah, where Nusraat Faria and Rodela Jannat played for the first time opposite him. Despite having set the release date several times, later the film was criticised for not releasing. The feature was theatrically released in Bangladesh amid the COVID-19 pandemic, which affected its commercial performance due to the closing of the cinemas. His next venture is Anonno Mamun's eighth directorial project legal drama Nabab LLB, (Note: The film is placed in the 2020 section, although the first phrase of the film was released on 16 December 2020 and the second phrase was released on 1 January 2021.) which is the first collaboration between director, opposite second collaboration between Mahiya Mahi and first between Orchita Sporshia. Aiming at raising social awareness, Nabab LLB touches upon themes such as the social exclusion of rape victims, the struggles and reactions of their family members, and the social stigmas that arise in a woman's life after such an unfortunate incident. The project began on 30 August 2020, after seven months from proposed date due to COVID-19 pandemic in Bangladesh. It was released on the Over-the-top media service iTheater due to the COVID-19 pandemic in Bangladesh, and became the first Dhallywood film to be released on any OTT service.

=== 2021–present ===
In 2021, several of his films were scheduled to release but were postponed indefinitely due to COVID-19 pandemic in Bangladesh.

In Eid al-fitr of 2022, his Bidrohi and Golui were released. For the film Khan paid-up with a remuneration ৳60 lakh, which made him the highest paid actor in the history of Bangladeshi films. (Note: Khan was paid ৳50 lakh for the film Nolok. However, according to the producer of the 2022 film Bidrohi, he took a fee of ৳60 lakh for the film Bidrohi. Although both are the highest remuneration in Bangladeshi cinema.) He also performed as the character Dholi in the film Golui.

Khan started 2023 by appearing in Leader where he performed as an independent youth. In the middle of the year he was in the tragic romance Priyotoma, in which he played a love failure. Filmmaker and author Sadat Hossain praised his performance, writing that Khan has shown his full potential with ultimate skill.

Khan was part of the film Agun, but shooting was halted in 2019. He was also part of the film Antaratma, which was postponed in 2021.

In 2025, he acted in the political-action film Taandob, which was released during Eid-ul-Adha.

He also acted in the film Borbaad, which was released on the Eid-ul-Fitr of 2025.

== Other works ==
=== Film organizing ===
Shakib Khan elected the biennial election for the first time of Bangladesh Film Artists Association in 2011 and served as its president. Then he was re-elected in the 2015 election beating veteran actor Ahmed Sharif. It was the second time in a row that Khan has earned the position of the president in the association. Khan quoted that, "I am really happy to be reelected as the position has given me the opportunity to serve film artistes again."

=== Film produced ===
On 10 February 2014 Khan launched his own production company SK Films and produced Hero: The Superstar. After almost 5 years, the actor returned to produce in 2019 with the film Password under the banner of his own production company. Which is his second produced film in terms of release. Earlier in 2018, he started producing a film titled Priyotoma directed by Himel Ashraf. However, subsequently the film was released under Arshad Adnan-production. As of February 2020, he has produced three films. His latest produced film is Bir, which was released on the occasion of Valentine's Day in 2020. Earlier in 2019, he announced the production of four films together.

=== Stage performances ===
Shakib Khan has also performed on many stages as well as acting. On 24 February 2011, on the occasion of the 2011 Cricket World Cup he performed on stage at the Tri-nation Big Show with the participation of artists from the three host countries India, Sri Lanka and Bangladesh. On 14 November 2019, he performed on stage at the inaugural ceremony of 2019 T10 League at the Sheikh Zayed Cricket Stadium in Abu Dhabi, the capital of the United Arab Emirates, hosted by Indian production and distribution company Red Chillies Entertainment. Where he has to face criticism for speaking in Hindi language. On 11 December 2019, he performed the stage at the West Trimohoni Jhanjhara Club in Murshidabad, West Bengal, India, at a variety show called Srabanti and Shakib Khan Night organised to help distressed students and orphans, where popular Indian actress Srabanti Chatterjee performed on the stage with him. On 1 February 2020, he performed the stage at the Golden Jubilee celebrations to mark the 50th anniversary of Charfasson Govt. College, where Riaz, Moushumi and Sadika Parvin Popy performed on stage with him. Speaker of the Jatiya Sangsad Shirin Sharmin Chaudhury, Chief Whip Nur-e Alam Chowdhury and Chairman of the Parliamentary Standing Committee of the Ministry of Youth and Sports Abdullah Al Islam Jacob were present as guests on the occasion. In late the 2023, he was attended a cultural event in Assam, India with Priyotoma lead actress Idhika Paul.

=== TV commercials ===
Khan first performed in an advertisement for Asian Duplex City and then for energy drink Power. In 2018, he performed in an advertisement of Banglalink, a mobile SIM service provider in Bangladesh, titled Beshi Beshi Khushi Kushi. In 2019, he was seen in this commercial for SMC Orsaline N. In April 2021, he done another commercial with the same company. In the early September 2021, he participated in a TV commercials for Berger Paints Bangladesh Limited with actress Nusraat Faria.

== In the media ==
Shakib Khan is widely regarded as one of the most popular and influential actors in Bengali cinema. He is often referred to as "King Khan" and "King of Dhallywood" also referred as "Number One Shakib Khan" (initialism as No1SK) (in reference to his 2010 film Number One Shakib Khan). (Note: Notable sources of titles addressed to Khan.) Khan has prolific career spanning over two decades, during which he has appeared in more than 247 films (Note: As of 28 May 2023, according to media reports on the occasion of 24 years in his career.) and described as one of the most successful actors in Bangladesh. Most of his films were commercially and critically successful. Khan is one of the most recognizable star of the present era of Bangladeshi film industry. As one of the most dominant actors in the Bangladeshi movie scene during the 2000s, 2010s and early 2020s, Khan is widely considered as one of the greatest and influential actors in the history of Bangladeshi cinema. He is critically acclaimed as one of the finest actors of Bangladesh. He is often compared to global superstars such as Shah Rukh Khan and Tom Cruise for his mass popularity in Bangladesh.

In 2013, Khan became the brand ambassador of Bangladesh's energy drink Pran Power Energy Drink. It is the first time Khan has made his debut as an ambassador. Then, in the same year, he became the brand ambassador of Asian Duplex Town, a housing project of Asian Town Development Limited. Where he participated in its various promotional activities, including commercials, for one year. In March 2019, he was appointed as the brand ambassador of SMC Orsaline-N. He works to promote the product on special occasions. In the beginning of September 2021, he was appointed as the brand ambassador of Berger Paints Bangladesh Limited. For the next two years, he will participate in various campaigns, engagement sessions and other promotional activities on behalf of Berger Paints Bangladesh. In 2022, he has been appointed as the Bangladesh Outreach Brand Ambassador of the North American Bengali Conference (NABC), which is considered to be the biggest gathering of Bengali speakers abroad. He is the first and only brand ambassador in the 42-year history of this conference.

Khan was ranked for the first time as a Bangladeshi in the list of top 20 stars of the Calcutta Times Most Desirable Man in the 2019 edition by the Indian media The Times of India's supplement Calcutta Times. The Calcutta Times ranked him 18th out of the top 20 stars, considering the business, audience demand and co-stars of the films released in India starring by him in 2018. (Note: The Times of India's poll here.) He is among the most popular celebrities in Bangladesh. Khan's popularity has been recorded by both Google and YouTube as the most-searched-and-viewed actor several times. Also television channels hold film festivals every year on Eid with his films as Shakib Khan Films Festival.

== Personal life ==
In 2006, Shakib Khan met Apu Biswas while costarring in Koti Takar Kabin (2006). He allegedly proposed to her in 2008 after completing the movie Kotha Dao Sathi Hobe. They were apparently married in a private wedding ceremony on 18 April 2008 at his Gulshan residence in Dhaka. However, the marriage was kept secret from the media and general public. In 2017, Apu Biswas informed in an interview on News24 that they were married. The couple has a son named Abraham Khan Joy, who was born on 27 September 2016 in a clinic in Kolkata, India.

On 22 November 2017, Shakib Khan filed for divorce and the couple got divorced on 22 February 2018. Biswas had converted to Islam after her marriage with Khan and took the name Apu Islam Khan, but she reportedly reverted to Hinduism after their divorce.

Shakib Khan and Shobnom Bubly were rumored to be dating while shooting for the film Bossgiri in 2016. There were strong rumours that they are married but the news was unconfirmed. On 26 September 2022, Bubly posted photos on Facebook which showed her with a baby bump. Incidentally, it was the birthday of Khan's son Abraham Khan Joy. On 30 September 2022, Khan and Bubly both officially confirmed on Facebook that they have been married since 20 July 2018 and together they have a son named Shehzad Khan Bir who was born on 21 March 2020 in Long Island Jewish Medical Center in New York City, United States. The couple have a daughter, Sharlin Khan, born on 11 May 2026.

He has also done some philanthropic work, such as supporting the Rana Plaza cause. Khan also owns a restaurant chain at Jamuna Future Park in Dhaka named Red Chicken. He has been one of the country's highest taxpayers for three consecutive years in 2016–17, 2018–19 and 2019–20. In mid-2019, Khan installed digital machine in 200 theaters across the country. The work of installing these under the name of SK Big Screen started from Eid al-Adha in 2019. The decision also created some controversy with Jaaz Multimedia, one of the country's leading production companies.

In January 2024, he joined as a director of Remark HB Limited, a multinational cosmetic product manufacturing company where he will work with the cosmetics chain Herlan.

Before 2021, his urban residence was situated in Gulshan, Dhaka. As of 2020, Khan started building his new home in Block E, Niketan, Dhaka and decided to move there. He has another residence in the village of Bhadun, Gazipur District, known as the "shooting village".

=== Religious views ===
Shakib Khan is a practicing sunni Muslim. He performed Umrah in 2018 and January 2024. In January 2016, he participated in the final prayer of the Bishwa Ijtema. He also appeared as a guest on NTV's Quran competition titled PHP Quraner Alo.

=== Political views ===
Shakib Khan was supposed to participate in the 11th Parliamentary Election of Bangladesh in 2018. On 10 November 2018, he said that he would buy the nomination papers for Bangladesh Awami League on 11 November. However, he changed his mind that night and stated that, he was not voting. He stated that, "It is not right for mine to leave cinema and be busy with anything else right now. It is possible to serve the country through cinema. So I decided not to take part in the election after discussing with my close ones." He praised prime minister Sheikh Hasina in that one minute video message. Khan referred to her as a Loving Mother and a Symbol of Development.

On 15 August 2025, Khan expressed condolences on the death anniversary of Bangabandhu Sheikh Mujibur Rahman. His statement subsequently drew widespread criticism. Following this, a protest demonstration was organised in Dhaka, during which Khan and 30 other public figures were described by protesters as cultural fascists.

He later denied having any affiliation with a political party in an interview with Samakal.

=== Health issue ===
Shakib Khan faced the first major illness in 2008, at that time he had to go to Thailand for treatment. He consults a physician regularly. On 15 May 2015, Khan felt physically ill due to abdominal pain caused by acidity. He was taken to LabAid Hospital again on 25 May. Later, as his physical condition deteriorated he left for Singapore on 26 May 2015 for advanced treatment. Khan returned to Dhaka on 31 May 2015, after receiving treatment at Mount Elizabeth Hospital in Singapore. On 13 April 2017, Khan fell ill with chest and neck pain and was admitted to LabAid Hospital in Dhaka for treatment. In January 2018, he was admitted to the emergency department of Sydney Hospital in Australia due to a high fever during the filming of the Super Hero and received treatment for two days. On 28 December 2019, he was re-admitted to Labaid Hospital in Dhaka due to cold fever and gastric problems during the filming of Bir.

== Controversies ==
=== Protests against Bollywood films ===
In 2015, films by Shakib Khan were banned from being screened by Bangladesh Motion Picture Exhibitors Association after he led protests against the screening of a Bollywood film, Wanted in Bangladesh. which was opened in cinemas on 23 January 2015 after Bangladesh Film Censor Board cleared its nationwide release, following a 50-year ban on Hindi-language films.

=== Indefinite ban by film organizations ===
On 10 April 2017, actress Apu Biswas revealed her secret marriage with Khan and their children on News24, responding to which he made comment upon the industry leading to his ban by Bangladesh Film Directors Association. In a response which, he stated the move as a conspiracy against him. Although, the organization faced criticism over the controversial decision. Despite his apology, he was indefinitely banned by 12 organizations, including Bangladesh Film Directors' Association. The ban was lifted on 1 May 2017.

=== Legal dispute over Rajneeti (2017) ===
In 2016, an autorickshaw driver named Ijazul Mia filed a case at the Habiganj Senior Judicial Magistrate's Court, alleging that his personal mobile phone number had been used without consent in a dialogue in the film Rajneeti (2017). The complaint, lodged on 29 October 2016, sought ৳5 million in damages on charges of fraud and defamation.

The film’s lead actor Shakib Khan, director Bulbul Biswas, and producer Ashfaq Ahmed were named in the case. According to the complaint, the mobile number was mentioned in a dialogue sequence in the film.

In response, Khan denied responsibility, stating that as an actor he had merely delivered scripted dialogue and that responsibility for the content rested with the film's producer, director, and scriptwriter.

=== 2019: Criticism over comments ===
On 27 May 2019, Shakib Khan claimed a doctorate in film at the founding anniversary of a fashion house called Prem's Collection as the part of promotion of the film Password and said he can make international quality films in the Sundarbans as well. The video of his remarks spread on social media, sparking widespread discussion and criticism. Many criticized him and made various humorous comments, statuses and videos. Khan said about his comments, "Many did not understand my comments, the way I actually wanted to explain. I mean, while I love making films, I also have a lot of experience. In that sense I have called myself a doctorate. Despite thousands of adversities, I am ready to make films. I meant it."

On the other hand, the director of the film Malek Afsari said about Khan's statements that, "The Sundarbans is a jungle, there are no five star hotels. As long as I stay, I have to trouble. This is what he meant that, even if leave me in the Sundarbans, I can make international quality films."

=== Legal notice by Shapla Media ===
On 11 September 2019, film production company Shapla Media sent a legal notice to Khan for not completing the work of a film titled Ektu Prem Dharkar (released as Bidrohi) on time. In addition to sending the notice to Khan, a copy was also sent to the Ministry of Information, the Secretariat and the private secretary to the Prime Minister, Bangladesh Film Producers, Distributors, Directors and Artists associations.

Khan told The Daily Star about the allegations, "I will definitely finish the rest of the work on the film. I also set aside a few days for this. I don't have received any complaint. I don't want to say more anything about this."

=== Penalty by RAJUK ===
On 18 November 2019, mobile court of RAJUK finned him ৳1 million with one year imprisonment for non-payment for illegally constructing an extended part of his house in Niketan, Gulshan, Dhaka without following the design approved by the Rajdhani Unnayan Kartripakkha (RAJUK).

=== Song rights issue ===
On 29 June 2020, Dilruba Khan filed a complaint on him and mobile service provider Robi Axiata Limited for copyrighting the song "Pagol Mon" in the film Password which was released in 2019. Earlier on 28 June, Dilruba Khan had lodged a written complaint against Khan in the Cyber Crime Unit of Dhaka Metropolitan Police (DMP) demanding ৳100 million (US$810,000) in compensation.

=== 2016: Sydney rape scandal ===
On 15 March 2023, Rahmat Ullah, one of the producers of the film Operation Agneepath, accused Shakib Khan of raping another female co-producer of the film. Producer Rahmat Ullah alleged that Shakib Khan raped a female co-producer of the film in Sydney in 2016. In 2018, when he went back to Australia, the police arrested him on that charge. Producer Rahmat Ullah filed a written complaint against him to the Bangladesh Film Producers and Distributors Association, Bangladesh Film Directors Association, Bangladesh Film Artists Association and Bangladesh Film Cameramen Association. In that charge sheet he mentioned, "He (Shakib Khan) raped one of our female co-producers. The victim herself also a Bangladeshi origin. She also filled a written complaint against him to the Australian police. I was a witness to that criminal complaint. It is not possible to express in words the social disgrace and slander that she and her family suffered socially after this incident. At some point it becomes impossible for her and her family to survive while seeking justice for rape." He also mentioned in the charge sheet that he was arrested by the police on charges of rape when he went back to Australia again in 2018.

Later, on late night of 18 March, he went to Gulshan police station to file a lawsuit against the producer, claiming the allegation as fake. However, the police did not accept the application of the lawsuit. Although, the police advised him to file the sued in court. The next day, he filed a written complaint against producer Rahmat Ullah at the office of the Detective Branch of Dhaka Metropolitan Police.

The next day on 20 March, Shakib Khan's Australian lawyer Upal Amin said in a video message that a woman was accused of raping Shakib Khan during the filming in 2016 in Australia. When she went to the police with this complaint, it was solved immediately at that time. He further said, "He (Shakib Khan) never had an arrest warrant, no lawsuit, he had never been arrested. Then there is no question of his escape from Australia." In another video message on 22 March, lawyer Upal Amin revealed a confirmation letter from the Australian Police Authority. He also showed an E-mail received from the police of St. George Detective Office in this video.

In view of this on 23 March, he filed a lawsuit against Rahmat Ullah in the Chief Metropolitan Magistrate (CMM) Court of Dhaka on charges of defamation and extortion. Khan's lawyer Tanveer Ahammed told Prothom Alo that the court recorded Khan's statement. Soon after the court took note of the allegations of the sued and issued a summons to the producer Rahmat Ullah to attend in the court on 26 April 2023. Then on 27 March, he filed another sued under the Digital Security Act against producer Rahmat Ullah in the Cyber Tribunal of Dhaka for defamation and extortion. According to Prothom Alo, Cyber Tribunal judge AM Zulfikar Hayat ordered to the Police Bureau of Investigation (PBI) to investigate the lawsuit. The court ordered the PBI to submit the investigation report by 6 June 2023.

Then on 13 April 2023, producer Rahmat Ullah also filed a defamation lawsuit against Khan in the Chief Metropolitan Magistrate Court of Dhaka. The court ordered the Police Bureau of Investigation (PBI) to investigate the sued and submit the report. In this regard, Khan's lawyer Khairul Hasan said that they have come to know about the matter, a lawsuit has been filed against his client Shakib Khan. The court did not directly take cognizance of it, ordered the PBI to investigate. The matter will be dealt with legally in due course.

On 26 April 2023, Rahmat Ullah surrendered to the Chief Metropolitan Magistrate (CMM) court and applied for bail. However, this bail was opposed by the plaintiff. After hearing both sides, the court granted Rahmat Ullah bail on a surety of ৳10,000. At the same time, the court ordered the transfer of the suit to the Dhaka Metropolitan Sessions Judge's Court for trial. Then on 30 April, producer Rahmat Ullah filed another suit against Khan for defamation in the first joint district judge court of Dhaka, seeking financial compensation of ৳1 billion. Rahmat Ullah's lawyer Md. Tabarak Hossain Bhuiyan told Pratham Alo that, "Film actor Shakib Khan made defamatory statements against his client producer Rahmat Ullah in various media. Through this, Rahmat Ullah has suffered irreparable financial and social losses. The value of this losses is ৳1 billion. His client has filed a money suit on Sunday to recover this amount.

== Awards and nominations ==
Khan has earned numerous accolades and become one of the most award-winning entertainers in Dhallywood with more than 30 awards including four National Film Awards, eight Meril Prothom Alo Awards, three Bachsas Awards and five CJFB Performance Awards. For the role of Surja, an independent young man in the family-drama film Bhalobaslei Ghor Bandha Jay Na (2010), he has received his first National Film Awards for Best Actor at the 35th National Film Awards in 2010. For the role of Munna, a boy who deeply loves his mother and gets separated from his mother when he was quite young in the action drama film Khodar Pore Ma, he received his second National Film Awards for Best Actor in 2012. In 2015, he portrayed himself as a famous film star who later fell in love with a simple girl and killed himself for her in the romantic drama Aro Bhalobashbo Tomay and earned him his third National Film Awards for Best Actor. For the role of Sabuj, a drug-addicted spoiled son of a rich man, who keeps himself out of society in the romantic drama film Swatta (2017), he received his fourth National Film Awards for Best Actor.

He has won a total of eight Meril Prothom Alo Awards, which is the highest number of any male film actor. He received his first Meril Prothom Alo Awards for Best Actor for Amar Praner Swami for the role of Raju in 2007. In addition to this he won the award seven more times. In 2016, he portrait as Sultan alias Raghab, a disguised professional assassin with mysterious past, tasked with assassinating a top government official in the action thriller Shikari, he received his eighth Meril Prothom Alo Awards for Best Actor prior this he also earned a Tele Cine Awards for Best Actor (Bangladesh). Khan received an honour as New Generation Actor at the fourth Cholochitra Mela in 2012. In 2022, he was also honored with Bachsas Sammanna-2022 for his contribution to Bengali cinema.

== See also ==
- List of Bangladeshi actors
- King Khan

== Sources ==
- BFDC (2012). "List of National Film Award recipients name 1975-2012" (PDF). Bangladesh Film Development Corporation (in Bengali). Dhaka: Ministry of Information (Bangladesh). pp. 1–23. Archived from the original (PDF) on 1 November 2020.
