= Rebeka (actress) =

Bangladeshi actress

- Born: Rabeya; 11 March 1971 (age 55); Shibchar, Madaripur, Dhaka division, Bangladesh
- Other names: Rebeka Rouf
- Occupation: Actress
- Years active: 1985–present

Rebeka Rouf (born as Rabeya on 11 March 1971), commonly known as Rebeka, is a Bangladeshi film actress. Rebeka made her debut in the Bangladeshi film industry as a child artist in the 1985 film Rajbodhu, directed by Ibne Mizan.

== Personal life ==
Rebeka was born as Rabeya on March 11, 1971, in Shibchar, Madaripur. Her name "Rabeya" was changed to "Rebeka" by the late director Shibli Sadiq. Rebeka married film actor Farhad Rouf on June 17, 1997 and they have two children.

== Career ==
Rebeka made her debut in the Bangladeshi film industry as a child artist in 1985, when she was in the tenth grade, by acting in the film Rajbodhu, directed by Ibne Mizan. Her first role as a heroine was in the 1990 film, Arjan, directed by Shibli Sadik, and starred Anju Ghosh and Kabita. In Moynamotir Songshar, she acted alongside her husband, Farhad. Rebeka's journey as a "mother" began with her role as actor Rubel's mother in the film Chorom Protishodh. She has been working as a mother since then.

Apart from films, Rebeka has also acted in several TV dramas and stage plays.

=== Selected filmography ===
Since her debut role in Rajbodhu in 1985, Rebeka's major acting credits include: Hason Raja (2002), Top Hero and Number One Shakib Khan (2010), Jaan Korban, Tiger Number One, and Boss Number One (2011), Bhalobashar Rong and Most Welcome (2012), Bhalobasha Aaj Kal, Inchi Inchi Prem, and Prem Prem Paglami (2013), Rajotto, Dobir Saheber Songshar, and Kistimaat (2014), Pure Jay Mon, Raja 420, Hero 420, Mental, Musafir, Niyoti, and Dhumketu (2016), Rajneeti (2017), Beporowa, Chalbaaz, Panku Jamai, Poramon 2, and Chittagainga Powa Noakhailla Maiya (2018), Nolok and Tui Amar Rani (2019), Shahenshah (2020), Bidrohi (2022), and Mona: Jinn – 2 (2024).
