= Munmun =

Munmun (Bengali: মুনমুন) is an Indian given name.

Notable people with this name include:

- Munmun Ahmed (born 1966), Bangladeshi actress and dancer
- Munmun (actress) (born 1981), Bangladeshi film actress
- Munmun Dutta (born 1987), Indian actress
- Munmun Lugun (born 1993), Indian footballer

Munmun may also refer to:

- Munmun, a 2018 young adult novel by Jesse Andrews.
