= Bhalobasha Express =

- Movie poster
- Bengali: ভালোবাসা এক্সপ্রেস
- Directed by: Shafi Uddin Shafi
- Screenplay by: Shafi Uddin Shafi
- Story by: Abdullah Zahir Babu
- Produced by: Mohammad Abul Kalam
- Starring: Shakib Khan; Apu Biswas; Ahmed Sharif; Afzal Sharif; Misha Sawdagor
- Cinematography: Asaduzzaman Mojnu
- Edited by: Touhid Hossain Chowdhury
- Music by: Ahmed Humayun
- Production company: Titash Kothachitro
- Distributed by: Titash Kothachitro
- Release date: 9 September 2014
- Running time: 135 minutes
- Country: Bangladesh
- Language: Bengali

Bhalobasha Express (Also known by the previous working title as Red: The Color of Love) is a 2014 Bangladeshi romantic drama film directed by Shafi Uddin Shafi and produced by Mohammad Abul Kalam under his Titash Kothachitro. It features superstar Shakib Khan, Apu Biswas and Mim Chowdhury (in her debut) in the lead roles. Also Ahmed Sharif, Misha Sawdagor, Afzal Sharif, Abdullah Saki, DJ Shohel have played important roles in the film.

"There is quite a hype created by Bollywood actors with their polished look and six-pack abs. Therefore, our audience are also demanding the same from the actors of this country. I respect their wishes and therefore, I am concentrating on making my body more slim and maintained."

— Protagonist Shakib Khan about his character in the film in an interview with Dhaka Tribune.

The film principal photography was begun in December 2013. Its soundtrack was composed by Ahmed Humayun. The film was released on May 9, 2014.

== Cast ==
- Shakib Khan as Turjo Khan
- Apu Biswas as Bonna Mirza
- Mim Chowdhury as Tamanna
- Ahmed Sharif
- Misha Sawdagor as Shafqat Mirza
- Afzal Sharif as Qutub
- Abdullah Saki
- DJ Sohel
- Jadu Azad

== Production ==
"I have tried to portray an interesting love story and I really hope that it will be well received and appreciated."

— Shafi Uddin Shafi on making Bhalobasha Express with Dhaka Tribune.

The principal photography of the film was begun in December 2013. Previously, the film was supposed to be released with the title as Red: The Color of Love on Valentine's Day, in 2014, but due to unavoidable circumstances in the post production phase, the release was delayed. later, the film's director changed its name to Bhalobasa Express.

== Soundtrack ==
Bhalobasha Express

Soundtrack album by Ahmed Humayun
- Released: May 8, 2014
- Studio: Titash Kothachitro
- Genre: Feature Film Soundtrack
- Length: 22:00
- Language: Bengali
- Label: CD Choice
- Producer: Ahmed Humayun

Ahmed Humayun chronology
Lattu Koshai (2014)	Bhalobasha Express (2014)	Janena A Mon (2014)
External audio
- Official Audio Jukebox on YouTube

The film's soundtrack is composed by Ahmed Humayun and lyrics penned by Kabir Bakul.

Track listing
No.	Title	Singer(s)	Length
1.	"Bhalobasha Express"	Pulak Adhikari, Munni	4:56
2.	"Tumi Amar Surjo"	Sumi Shobnom, Rupom	4:56
3.	"Ichche Kore Ural Mari"	Tousif, Moon	4:09
4.	"Charo Dike Hajar Premik"	Sumi Shobnom, Rupom	4:06
5.	"Boro Bou Ke Somoy Dichi"	Mohsin, Moon, Sumi Shobnom, Dinat Jahan Munni	3:53
Total length:			22:00

== Release ==
Bhalobasha Express was released in more than seventy cinemas on May 9, 2014, around the country. The film had its world television premiere on ATN Bangla on Eid al-Adha 2016.
