= King Khan =

King Khan may refer to:

- Genghis Khan, Mongol Empire founder ruler and Great Khan
- King Khan (musician), Canadian musician, frontman of the bands King Khan and the Shrines and The King Khan & BBQ Show
- Shah Rukh Khan (born 1965), Indian actor informally known as King Khan
- Shakib Khan (born 1979), Bangladeshi actor, producer, singer, popularly referred to as King Khan
- Oliver Kahn (born 1969), former German football player (goalkeeper) nicknamed "King Kahn"
- Shao Kahn, a boss and recurring playable character from the Mortal Kombat fighting game series
- Khan Abdul Ghaffar Khan (1890–1988), Pashtun political and spiritual leader known for his non-violent opposition to British Rule in India and a close friend of Mahatma Gandhi
- Amir Khan (boxer), British boxer also known by the nickname King Khan
- Kublai Khan (band), Texas based slam band known for epic breakdowns and energy

== Entertainment ==
- King Khan (film), a Dhallywood film starring Shakib Khan
