= Shahidul Alam Sachchu =

Bangladeshi actress

- শহিদুল আলম সাচ্চু
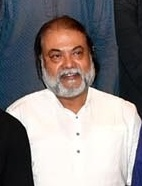
- Sachchu in 2023
- Occupation: Actor
- Years active: 1990-present
- Awards: Bangladesh National Film Award for Best Supporting Actor

Shahidul Alam Sachchu is a Bangladeshi film and television actor. He won Bangladesh National Film Award for Best Supporting Actor for his role in the film Britter Baire.

== Career ==
Sachchu's stage of acting began with the stage play. He later starred in the drama and the film. His first film was Meghla Akash. Among his other films, Megher Pore Megh (2004), Bidrohi Padma (2006), Gangajatra (2009), Britter Baire (2009). General Manager (Program) at Channel i.

== Works ==
=== Film ===
Key
†	Denotes productions that have not yet been released

Year	Title	Role	Director	Notes	Ref(s)
1992	Anjali		Darashiko		
1995	Adorer Shontan		Amzad Hossain		
1995	Domka		Abdullah Al Mamun		
1997	Chardike Shotru		Shahidul Islam Khokon		
2001	Bihongo		Abdullah Al Mamun		
2002	Meghla Akash	Khoibor Mollah	Nargis Akhter		
2002	Shotto Mithyar Lorai		Monowar Khokon		
2003	Praner Manush	Smriti's father	Amzad Hossain		
2003	Adhiar		Saidul Anam Tutul		
2003	Kokhono Megh Kokhono Brishti		Moushumi		
2004	Megher Pore Megh	Chuni Mia	Chashi Nazrul Islam		
2004	Durotto		Morshedul Islam		
2004	Fuler Moto Bou	Sumon	Azadi Hasnat Firoz		
2004	Amader Sontan		Ispahani Arif Jahan		
2005	Jongol		Morshedul Islam		
2005	Matritto	Hemayet	Amzad Hossain		
2005	Shasti	Ram Lochan Chakraborty	Chashi Nazrul Islam		
2005	Hajar Bachhor Dhore		Shuchanda		
2005	Ghar Jamai				
2005	Mohabbat Zindabad				
2005	Shuva		Chashi Nazrul Islam		
2005	Damn Care				
2005	Taka	Zindar	Shahidul Islam Khokon		
2005	Tak Jhal Mishti	Jamal Ahmed	Debashish Biswas		
2005	Agun Amar Naam		Swapan Chowdhury		
2005	Meher Negar		Moushumi & Mushfiqur Rahman Gulzar		
2006	Nirontor		Abu Sayeed		
2006	Bidrohi Padma	Ashraf Ali Pathan (Zamindar)	Badol Khondokar		
2006	Nikhoj Songbad				
2007	Aha!	Rafiq	Enamul Karim Nirjhar		
2007	Made in Bangladesh	Agontuk	Mostofa Sarwar Farooki		
2007	Ami Bachte Chai		Razzak		
2008	Swapnapuron		Shahidul Islam Khokon		
2009	Gangajatra	Ratan	Syed Wahiduzzaman Diamond		
2009	Britter Baire		Golam Rabbani Biplob		
2011	Modhumoti		Shahjahan Chowdhury		
2011	Bahattor Ghonta				
2012	Lal Tip		Swapan Ahmed		
2012	Common Gender - The Film	Babli's father	Noman Robin		
2013	Hridoye 71		Sadeq Siddiqui		
2014	Ek Cup Cha		Noyeem Imtiaz Neyamul		
2014	Olpo Olpo Premer Golpo	Tania's father	Saniat S Hossain		
2014	Priya Tumi Sukhi Hou		Gitali Hasan		
2015	Anil Bagchir Ekdin		Morshedul Islam		
2015	Noy Choy		Raffael Ahsan		
2016	Purno Doirgho Prem Kahini 2	Feroz	Shafi Uddin Shafi		
2016	Mon Jane Na Moner Thikana	Mama	Mushfiqur Rahman Gulzar		
2017	Rajneeti		Bulbul Bishwas		
2018	Leader				
2018	Inspector Notty K	Shruti's father	Ashok Pati		
2018	Sultan: The Saviour	Alia's father	Raja Chanda		
2018	Dahan	Chairman	Raihan Rafi		
2018	Swapnajaal	Rahman Mia, Apu's father	Giasuddin Selim		
2018	Postmaster 71		Srijon Bardhan		
2019	Aloy Bhubon Bhora		Amirul Islam		
2019	Fagun Haway	Azmat	Tauquir Ahmed		
2019	Nolok	Moti	Sakib Sonet and Team		
2019	Bhalobashar Uttap		himself		
2019	Beporowa	Manik/Ratan	Raja Chanda		
2019	Ratrir Jatri		Habibul Islam Habib		
2021	Sphulingo		Tauquir Ahmed		
2021	Jibon Jontrona				
2023	Adventure of Sundarbans		Abu Raihan Jewel		
TBA	Mujib: The Making of a Nation	A. K. Fazlul Huq	Sakib Sonet and Team		
TBA	Neel Foring				
TBA	Shoroter Joba				
TBA	Suzuki				
TBA	Baksho Bodol		S R Mazumder		

=== Telefilm ===
Year	Telefilm	Director	Channel	Notes
2010	Vetorer Manus	Shahhidul Alam Sachchu		
2016	Fulmotir Nirbacon	Sumon Anwar	BanglaVision	Eid al-Fitr is circulated
2016	Cetona Cetoner Podaboli	Mainul Hasan & Md Mainul Haque	Channel I	

=== Single drama ===
Year	Name	Director	Channel	Notes
2015	kalagulo	Shahidul Alam Sachchu		
2016	Ji Sir Thik Bolechen	Maruf Mithu	Gazi TV	Eid-Ul Fitar's Programs
