= Praner Manush =

- Movie poster
- Bengali: প্রাণের মানুষ
- Directed by: Amjad Hossain
- Written by: Amjad Hossain (dialogue)
- Screenplay by: Amjad Hossain
- Story by: Ali Hassan
- Produced by: Azizul Haque Putu
- Starring: Shakib Khan; Shabnur; Ferdous Ahmed
- Cinematography: Dilip Bhaumik
- Edited by: Jinnat Hossain
- Music by: Alauddin Ali
- Production company: Alpona Kothachitro
- Release date: 11 July 2003
- Country: Bangladesh
- Language: Bangla

Praner Manush is a 2003 Bangladeshi romantic drama film. The film is directed by Amjad Hossain and produced by Azizul Haque Putu. story written by Ali Hassan, screenplay and dialogue by Amjad Hossain himself. It feature Shakib Khan, Shabnur and Ferdous Ahmed.

The soundtrack was composed by Alauddin Ali, the cinematography was handled by Dilip Bhaumik, choreographed by Munmun Ahmed,Amir Hossain Babu, Masum Babul and editing was by Jinnat Hossain. The film was released on 11 July 2003, in Bangladesh. It received two nominations at the 6th Meril-Prothom Alo Awards in the Best Film Director – Critics (Amjad Hossain) and Best Film Actor – Critics (Shakib Khan) categories. Shakib Khan has been nominated for an award for the first time in his career.

== Cast ==
- Shakib Khan as Raaj
- Shabnur as Smity
- Ferdous Ahmed as Ovi
- Nasima Khan as Raaj's mother
- Shahidul Alam Sachchu
- Dolly Johur as Ovi's mother
- GM Ansari
- Montazur Rahman Akbar
- Jamilur Rahman Shakha
- Don (actor)
- Boby as Moslem
- Ali Raj (special appearance)
- Amjad Hossain as Raaj's father (cameo)

== Soundtrack ==
Praner Manush

Soundtrack album by Alauddin Ali
- Released: 2003
- Studio: Alpona Kothachitro
- Genre: Film soundtrack
- Length: 25:36
- Language: Bengali language
- Label: CD Choice
- Producer: Alauddin Ali

Alauddin Ali chronology
Noyon Bhora Jol (2003)	''Praner Manush'' (2003)	Sahoshi Manush Chai (2003)

The film's soundtrack is composed by Alauddin Ali and lyrics penned by Amjad Hossain. Also, a song named "Past is Past" was written by Moniruzzaman Monir. All the songs are sung by Sabina Yasmin, Andrew Kishore, Kanak Chapa, Monir Khan, Sujit Mostafa, and Momtaz Begum respectively.

All music is composed by Alauddin Ali.

Track listing
No.	Title	Lyrics	Singer(s)	Length
1.	"Ekta Golpo Lekha Holo"	Amjad Hossain	Andrew Kishore & Konok Chapa	4:48
2.	"Bondhu Ekta Chithi Dio"	Amjad Hossain	Andrew Kishore & Konok Chapa	5:03
3.	"Ronger Manush Rongila Re"	Amjad Hossain	Momtaz Begum & Sujit Mostafa	5:05
4.	"Past Is Past"	Moniruzzaman Monir	Andrew Kishore & Monir Khan	5:05
5.	"Ronger Manush Rongila Re" (Female Version)	Amjad Hossain	Sabina Yasmin	5:35
Total length:				25:36

== Accolades ==
6th Meril-Prothom Alo Awards

- Nominated: Best Film Director (Critics) – Amjad Hussain
- Nominated: Best Film Actor (Critics) – Shakib Khan
