= Bidrohi (film) =

2022 Bangladeshi film directed by Shahin Sumon

- Directed by: Shaheen Sumon
- Written by: Delwar Hossain Dil
- Story by: Delwar Hossain Dil
- Produced by: Selim Khan
- Starring: Shakib Khan; Shabnom Bubly; Sushmita Mridula; Misha Sawdagor; Amit Hasan; Shiba Shanu; Sadek Bachchu
- Music by: Shamim Mahmud; Akassh; Shree Pritam
- Production company: Shapla Media
- Distributed by: Shapla Media
- Release date: 3 May 2022
- Country: Bangladesh
- Language: Bengali
- Budget: ৳3.3-3.5 crore (equivalent to ৳−4.2 crore or US$−350,000 in 2024)
- Box office: ৳1 crore (equivalent to ৳1.2 crore or US$99,000 in 2024)

Bidrohi (transl. The Rebel) is a 2022 Bangladeshi action drama film. The film is directed by Shahin Sumon and is produced by Selim Khan under the banner of Shapla Media. The story, screenplay and dialogue were written by Delwar Hossain Dil. It features Shakib Khan, Shabnom Bubly and Sushmita Mridula in the lead roles. Also features Misha Sawdagor, Amit Hasan, Shiba Shanu, Don, Sadek Bachchu and Saberi Alam have played supporting roles in film.

The principal photography of the film was begun on September 25, 2018. The film's title was changed several times during production, though was finally get censor clearance as the name of Bidrohi on March 16, 2020. The film's release was postponed several times. It was initially planned to release on the occasion of Bengali new year Pohela Baishakh 2020. It was also postponed due to the COVID-19 pandemic in Bangladesh in 2021. As the situation did not improve, director Shahin Suman initially planned to release the film on online streaming app Cinebuzz. Finally it was released on May 3, 2022, in 102 cinemas on the occasion of Eid al-Fitr in around the country. It was made with a budget ৳3.3−3.5 crore, but was a box office bomb, and grossed less than ৳1 crore (US$81,000).

== Cast ==
- Shakib Khan as Mirza Nafis Iqbal Surjo
- Shabnom Bubly as Mati
- Sadek Bachchu as Mari's father
- Misha Sawdagor as Amzad
- Saberi Alam
- Amit Hasan as Aslam
- Shiba Shanu

== Production ==
The film Bidrohi is the twenty-first collaboration between protagonist and the director and debut of Suchishmita Mridula. Shakib Khan and Shobnom Bubly were selected for the two lead roles in the film, among the performers, Khan was signed for the film remuneration of ৳60 lakh. The film's stars Shobnom Bubly as the lead actress alongside Shuchismita Mridula, although initially Bubly was not interested in acting. Bipasha Kabir made a guest appearance in the song "Aami 440 Volt". Other actors' names were later revealed in various media. The film's making was announced with the name of Ektu Prem Dorkar Mananiyo Sarker under production of Shapla Media and the newcomer heroine was announced on June 26, 2018, at The Westin Dhaka. According to the film's director Shahin Sumon, the film named after Asif Akbar's 2017 song titled "Ekta Prem Darkar Mananiyo Sarker" composed by Shree Pritam, which was received a good response among the youth. The filming was begun on September 25, at the Bangladesh Film Development Corporation. Among the songs, a song titled "Ami Jodi Bhul Hoi" from the film was shot in Cox's Bazar from February 8–10, 2019. Also two songs from the film were shot in Thailand. Filming was done at various places including the Shakib Khan's shooting house Jannat in Aftabnagar, Dhaka and Pubail, Gazipur. The filming of Bidrohi was wrapped up in about a year and a half.

The production company Shapla Media initially planned to release of the film on the occasion of 2018 Victory Day of Bangladesh; However, the work was not completed within the stipulated time. Subsequently, Shapla Media sent a legal notice to protagonist Shakib Khan for not completing the post-production dubbing on time on September 11, 2019. However, the dubbing of Shakib Khan's character was completed from September 14–17, 2019. The film submitted for clearance to the Bangladesh Film Censor Board; and received uncut censor clarification on March 16.

== Naming ==
The film initially began with the title Ektu Prem Darkar Mananiyo Sarkar. Shortly after filming started, media reports suggested that the title might be changed to Kalprit or Captain. However, during production, the title was shortened to Ektu Prem Darkar. Approximately one and a half years later, in December 2019, the title was officially changed to Criminal, and this new title was reported in the media. In February 2020, the title was revised once again and received censor clearance under its current title.

== Soundtrack ==
Bidroho

Soundtrack album by Akassh, Shree Pritam and Shamim Mahmud
- Released: March 19 – April 11, 2021
- Studio: Shapla Media
- Genre: Feature film soundtrack
- Length: 11:10
- Language: Bengali
- Label: Cinebuzz
- Producers: Akassh, Shree Pritam and Shamim Mahmud

Akassh, Shree Pritam and Shamim Mahmud chronology
Chittagainga Powa Noakhailla Maiya (2018)	Bidroho (2021)	Poddar Prem (2019)

Singles from Captain Khan
- 1. "Vabini Kokhono Evabe" Released: 19 March 2021; 2. "Ami Jodi Vul Hoi" Released: 1 April 2021; 3. "Ami 440 Volt" Released: 1 April 2021

The film's soundtrack is composed by Shamim Mahmud, Akassh and Shree Pritam and lyrics penned Sudip Kumar Dip. Also, background music by Asadur Rahman. The film's first romantic track titled "Vabini Kokhon Evabe" sung by Imran Mahmudul and composed by Akassh was revealed on March 19, 2021. Its second track "Ami Jodi Bhul Hoi" sung by debutant Deep Bhowmik and Maya Mani and composed by Shamim Mahmud was released on April 1 of the same year. It third song "Aami 440 Volt" sung by Maya Moni and composed by Shree Pritam was revealed on the same day. All the songs are revealed on YouTube by Cinebaaz.

Track listing
No.	Title	Lyrics	Music	Singer(s)	Length
1.	"Vabini Kokhono Evabe"	Sudip Kumar Dip	Akassh	Imran Mahmudul	3:40
2.	"Ami Jodi Vul Hoi"	Sudip Kumar Dip	Shamim Mahmud	Deep Bhowmik and Maya Moni	3:32
3.	"Ami 440 Volt"	Sudip Kumar Dip	Shree Pritam	Maya Moni	3:58
Total length:					11:10

== Promotion and release ==
The producers of the film started it promotion after getting the film's censor clearance. Its promotion began with the reveal of the first look poster on the occasion of Bangabandhu Sheikh Mujibur Rahman's birth centenary. The production company Shapla Media revealed two teasers and trailers before the film's release for promotion. The film's release was postponed several times. It was initially planned to be released on the occasion of the Bengali new year Pohela Baishakh 2020. It was also postponed due to the COVID-19 pandemic in Bangladesh in 2021. It was released in 102 cinemas nationwide on May 3, 2022, on the occasion of Eid al-Fitr.

=== Home media ===
The film became available as VOD on online streaming service Bioscope on March 8, 2023.

== Reception ==
Following the reveal of the film's trailer, the audiences on social media accused the film's script is copied from the 2015 Indian Telugu-language film Bengal Tiger featuring Ravi Teja, Tamannaah and Raashii Khanna, also criticized for the mispronunciations in the dubbing.

=== Box office ===
The film's production company Shapla Media told on NTV that the film's budget is ৳4 crore. Later, its production cost was revised to ৳3.3−3.5 crore. The film was a commercial failure at the box office, and grossed under ৳1 crore (US$81,000).
