= Eka (actress) =

Bangladeshi actress

Eka একা
- Born: Mymensingh
- Occupations: Actress; Model

Eka is a Bangladeshi actress and model, who acted in films and television dramas. She also worked in TVCs as model, and has acted in more than 30 films. She was arrested by the police in July 2021 on charges of the Women and Children Repression Prevention Act against her employer. The police also filed a separate narcotics case against her.

== Career ==
Eka made her debut in Dhallywood with Teji which was directed by Kazi Hayat and Manna was her co-star. After this film she acted in Dhor. This film was also directed by Kazi Hayat and Manna was her co-star in that film too. She share screen with Shakib Khan in his third film Ajker Dapot in 1999.

== Selected filmography ==
- Teji
- Dhor
- Baba Keno Asami
- Ajker Dapot (1999)
- Bahadur Sontan
- Raj Golam
- Police Officer
- Moron Niye Khela
- Kalo Chosma
