= Sobar Upore Tumi =

- VCD Cover
- Directed by: F I Manik
- Written by: Chatku Ahmed
- Produced by: Kishore Shah
- Starring: Shakib Khan; Swastika Mukherjee; Victor Banerjee; Uzzal; Suchorita; Misha Sawdagor
- Cinematography: Mostafa Kamal
- Edited by: Touhid Hossain Choudhury
- Music by: Devendranath; Alauddin Ali
- Distributed by: Kishan Chalochitra
- Release dates: 13 November 2009 (Bangladesh); 17 September 2010 (India)
- Running time: 150 minutes
- Countries: Bangladesh; India
- Language: Bengali

Sobar Upore Tumi (Bengali: সবার উপরে তুমি) is a Bangladeshi Bengali-language film. The film, directed by Bangladeshi filmmaker F I Manik, is a romantic family story. It stars Shakib Khan, Swastika Mukherjee, Victor Banerjee, Uzzal, Suchorita and others. In India this film was released under the title Aamar Bhai Aamar Bon. It is an Indian and Bangladesh joint production. This film also dubbed in Hindi as Hello Zindagi (2017) under the banner of Angel Digital.

== Plot ==
The story is of Mr. Chowdhury, (Uzzol) a businessman who lived with his wife Mamata (Suchorita) and children Rahul (Shakib Khan) and Ria. An accident totally changed his life. Mamata could not bear the accident and was admitted into a mental asylum. Ruahul and Ria became homeless by the conspiracy of Mr. Chowdhury's sister. Mr. Chowdhury lost his family. In such a condition, Rahul and Ria started their struggling in life. Rahul and Ria grew up, and Rahul took a job as a driver of Biplab Babu. Mithila (Swastika Mukherjee) was the only child of Biplab (Victor Banerjee). She initially did not like Rahul for his attitude, but later, she fell in love with him. Mithila helped Rahul a lot to establish his own business. Ultimately, Rahul became successful, and with the help of his well-wishers, he found his parents. In this way, everything ended on a happy note.

== Cast ==
- Shakib Khan as Rahul
- Swastika Mukherjee as Mithila
- Victor Banerjee as Mithila's father
- Uzzal as Rahul's father
- Suchorita as Rahul's mother
- Ali Raj
- Misha Sawdagor
- Ahmed Sharif
- Shiba Shanu
- Kabila
- Nasreen
- Rasheda Chowdhary

== Crew ==
- Producer: Kishore Shah
- Story: Chatku Ahmed
- Screenplay: Chatku Ahmed
- Director: F I Manik
- Script: Mohammad Rafiquzzaman
- Dialogue: Chatku Ahmed
- Cinematography: Mostafa Kamal
- Editing: Touhid Hossain Chowdhury
- Music: Devendranath and Alauddin Ali
- Distributor: Kishan Chalochitra Ltd.

== Music ==
Sobar Upore Tumi

Studio album by Devendranath Alauddin Ali
- Released: 2009 (Bangladesh)
- Genre: Feature film soundtrack
- Producer: Eagle Music

Sobar Upore Tumi's music was directed by Devendranath (India) and Alluddion Ali (Bangladesh). Munshi Wadud wrote the lyrics.

=== Soundtrack ===
Trac	Song	Singers	Performers	Notes
1	Memshaheb Nandini	Abhijeet Bhattacharya	Shakib Khan and Swastika Mukherjee	
2	Tumi Emoni Ekjon	Priya Bhattacharya, Babul Supriyo	Shakib Khan and Swastika Mukherjee	
3	Amar Ek Hata Surjo	Moni Kishor		
4	Rajkumar Ashbe Pagri Pore	Babul Supriyo	Shakib Khan	
5	Kisher Shahrukh Kiser Salman Kisher Shakib	Monir Khan and Baby Naznin	Kabila and Nasreen	
6	Ei Tumi Ke Tumi	Priya Bhattacharya and Abhi Dutta		

== Home media ==
Sobar Upore Tumi's copyrights take G-Series and made as VCD, DVD and cassette marketed/distributed in Bangladesh. For India the films copyrights take Angel and made as VCD, DVD and cassette.
