= Nolok =

2019 Bangladeshi film directed by Sakib Sonet

- Theatrical release poster
- Directed by: Sakib Sonet
- Screenplay by: Sakib Sonet
- Story by: Ferrari Forhad
- Produced by: Sakib Sonet
- Starring: Shakib Khan; Eamin Haque Bobby
- Music by: JK Majlish; Ahmed Humayun; Savvy; Hridoy Khan; Adit Rahman
- Production company: Be Happy Entertainment
- Distributed by: Jaaz Multimedia
- Release date: June 5, 2019
- Running time: 127 minutes
- Country: Bangladesh
- Language: Bengali

Nolok (Bengali: নোলক; transl. "Nose-ring") is a 2019 Bangladeshi romantic comedy-drama film. The film was screenplayed, produced and directed by Sakib Sonet and Team. (Note: Rashed Raha has directed 85% work of the film and the rest work of the film is directed by Iftekhar Chowdhury and MD. Shinha Sarder. However, it was release clearance by the Bangladesh Film Censor Board in the name of Sakib Sonnet and Team.) It was produced by Be Happy Entertainment and distributed by Jaaz Multimedia and the story, dialogue, choreography and soundtrack composed by Ferari Forhad. The film features Shakib Khan and Eamin Haque Bobby in the lead roles. The cast also includes Omar Sani, Moushumi, Shahidul Alam Sachchu, Tariq Anam Khan, Supriyo Dutta, Rajatava Dutta and many more.

The shooting of the film commenced on 1 December 2017 and this first phase of the film was shot in 25-day schedule, entirely filmed in Ramoji Film City, Hyderabad, India.

== Synopsis ==
There are two brothers living in a village. Although they have a lot of land and money, they do not have much work to do. The two brothers love each other very much. There are also two advisors to advise them. Shaon (Shakib Khan), the eldest brother's son, always spends time with his friends. On the other hand, the younger brother's daughter Kajal (Bobby Haque) also spends her busy days with her friends. There are fights and quarrels between Shaon and Kajal always going on. But a family feud draws the two closer. The distance between the two brothers continues to grow centering on the Shaon-Kajal relationship. The story of the film goes through this.

== Cast ==
- Shakib Khan as Shaon Talukdar
- Bobby as Kajal Talukdar
- Omar Sunny as Juwel Mahmud
- Moushumi
- Tariq Anam Khan as Kader Talukdar
- Rajatava Dutta as Nader Talukdar
- Shahidul Alam Sachchu as Moti
- Supriyo Dutta as Roju
- Nima Rahman as Shaon's mother
- Rebeka Rouf as Suroni
- Raja Dutt as DB Police officials
- Anuvab Mahbub as DB Police officials

== Production ==
The film's Muharat was held on 22 November 2017, at a restaurant in Dhaka, where the production company Be Happy Entertainment announced the name of Rashed Raha as the director of the film.

== Soundtrack ==
Nolok (Original Motion Picture Soundtrack)

Soundtrack album by Adit, Ahmed Humayun, JK Majlish, Hridoy Khan and Savvy
- Released: 2019
- Venue: Bobstar Films
- Genre: Feature film soundtrack
- Length: 18:51
- Language: Bengali
- Label: Be Happy Entertainment
- Producer: Ahmed Humayun

Singles from Nolok
- 1. "Shitol Pati (শীতল পাটি)" Released: 9 May 2019

JK Majlish chronology
Nolok (2019)

Ahmed Humayun chronology
Nolok (2019)

Hridoy Khan chronology
Nolok (2019)

Adit Rahman chronology
Nolok (2019)

Savvy chronology
Nolok (2019)

The film's soundtrack is composed by Adit, Ahmed Humayun, JK Majlish, Hridoy Khan and Savvy. The songs from the soundtrack "Shitol Pati" is sung by Asif Akbar. The song written by Ferrari Forhad and composed by Ahmed Humayun.

Track listing
No.	Title	Lyrics	Music	Artist(s)	Length
1.	"Shitol Pati"	Ferari Forhad	Ahmed Humayun	Asif Akbar	3:29
2.	"Kolikaler Radha"	Tarik Tuhin	Savvy	Biswajeeta Deb	3:29
3.	"Jole Bhasha Phool"	SA Haque Alik	Hridoy Khan	Hridoy Khan & Anika	4:37
4.	"Chupi Chupi"	Asif Iqbal	Adit & Ishtiaque Hasan	Adit & Kona	4:30
5.	"Nolok Theme"	Ferari Forhad	Jk Majlish	JK Majlish	5:00
