= Lattu Koshai =

- Movie poster
- Bengali: লাট্টু কসাই
- Directed by: P. A. Kajol
- Screenplay by: P. A. Kajol
- Story by: Joseph Satabdhi
- Produced by: Mohammad Dulal Miah
- Starring: Shakib Khan; Ferdous; Monowar Hossain Dipjol; Munmun; Shahnoor
- Cinematography: Laal Mohammad
- Edited by: Amzad Hossain
- Music by: Shouquat Ali Imon
- Production company: Dulon Kothachitro
- Distributed by: Jononi Kothachitro
- Release date: 28 February 2014
- Running time: 131 minutes
- Country: Bangladesh
- Language: Bengali

Lattu Koshai (Bengali: লাট্টু কসাই, transl. Lattu the Butcher) is a 2014 Bangladeshi action-drama film directed by P. A. Kajol and produced by Mohammad Dulal Miah under the banner of Dulon Kothachitro. It features superstar Shakib Khan, Ferdous, Monowar Hossain Dipjol, Munmun and Shahnoor in the lead roles. Also Nasir Khan, Ilias Kobra, Nagma, Sharmili Ahmed and Sadek Bachchu performed in supporting roles.

Monowar Hossain Dipjol played as an antagonist after 8 years in the film, who has been acting as a hero since the 2006 film Koti Takar Kabin, after which he no longer played an antagonist. The film was released on February 28, 2014.

== Synopsis ==
The story revolves around how Lattu Koshai (Monowar Hossain Dipjol) rises from a petty butcher to a leading man and Rakib (Shakib Khan) is a defiant youth, who protested against the injustice of the upper class of the society, fell into their wrath. On the other hand, Badal (Ferdous Ahmed), does various misdeeds. Once he gets to know Rakib, and becomes a good person and helps Rakib to prevent injustice.

== Cast ==
- Shakib Khan as Rakib
- Ferdous Ahmed as Badol
- Monowar Hossain Dipjol as Lattu Koshai a.k.a Lat Bhai
- Munmun
- Shahnoor
- Sharmili Ahmed
- Sadek Bachchu
- Nasir Khan
- Chashi Nazrul Islam
- Ilias Kobra
- Sanko Panja
- Danny Raj
- Nagma
- Dulari Chakraborty
- Kamol Patekar
- Sadek Siddique
- Shetu (child artist)

== Production ==
The film began in 2005 as Lat Bhai and was shot for two consecutive years. After 90 percent of the work was completed, the film's work stopped due to schedule complications of the lead actors. After about 8 years in 2013, the filming of the film resumed and its production was completed by the end of the same year.

== Soundtrack ==
Lattu Koshai (Original Motion Picture Soundtrack)

Soundtrack album by Shouquat Ali Imon
- Released: January 1, 2014
- Studio: Jononi Kothachitro
- Genre: Feature Film Soundtrack
- Length: 18:23
- Language: Bengali
- Label: Eagle Music
- Producer: Shouquat Ali Imon

Shouquat Ali Imon chronology
Lobhe Paap Paape Mrittu (2014)	Lattu Koshai (Original Motion Picture Soundtrack) (2014)	Hero: The Superstar (2014)

All lyrics are written by Kabir Bakul; all music is composed by Shouquat Ali Imon.

Track listing
No.	Title	Singer(s)	Length
1.	"Chokeri Ishara Jodi"	Runa Laila, Andrew Kishore	4:42
2.	"Dhiki Dhiki Agun Jole"	Asif Akbar, Runa Laila	4:53
3.	"Monta Nile Churi Kore"	Kanak Chapa, Khan Asifur Rahman Agun	4:34
4.	"Sentiment Er Duniya"	Khan Asifur Rahman Agun	4:45
Total length:			18:23

== Release ==
The film was cleared for release by the Bangladesh Film Censor Board on December 23, 2013, and was released nationwide on February 28, 2014.
