= Doctor Bari =

Bangladeshi film

- VCD Cover
- Directed by: Azizur Rahman
- Written by: A.T.M. Shamsuzzaman
- Starring: Shakib Khan; A.T.M. Shamsuzzaman; Amit Hasan; Jona; Shabnaz; Suchorita; Salauddin Lavlu
- Music by: Imon Saha
- Distributed by: G Series
- Release date: 13 July 2007
- Country: Bangladesh
- Language: Bengali

Doctor Bari (Bengali: ডাক্তার বাড়ি, lit. 'The Doctor's House') is a Bangladeshi Bengali-language film directed by Azizur Rahman and written by A.T.M. Shamsuzzaman. The film was released on 17 July 2007 in Bangladesh. It was produced by NTV Production House and distributed by G Series. It is a family comedy film and stars Shakib Khan, A.T.M. Shamsuzzaman, Jona, Shabnaz, Amit Hasan and Salauddin Lavlu.

== Plot ==
The film is about three doctors.One is alopathy, one is homeopathy and the other is a Aminal doctor.

== Cast ==
- Shakib Khan as Dr. Akkel Ali
- Amit Hasan as Dr. Jahur Ali
- Shabnaz as Trishna
- Jona as Urmi
- Suchorita as Boro Bou
- A.T.M. Shamsuzzaman as Dr. Rahmat Ali
- Salauddin Lavlu
- Khalil Ullah Khan
- Pran Roy
- Arjumand Ara Bokul
- Afzal Sharif
- A. K. M. Hasan
- Gulshan Ara Ahmed

== Music ==
Doctor Bari's music is directed by Imon Saha.

=== Soundtrack ===
| Tracks | Titles | Singers |
|---|---|---|
| 1 | Tomar premer misty | Monir Khan and Kanak Chapa |
| 2 | Jonmodine Kande shishu | Syed Abdul Hadi |
| 3 | Tomar Acholer Pashe | Andrew Kishore and Sabina Yasmin |
| 4 | Bavhulra ora bavhul | Monir Khan |
| 5 | Dheki Nache Dapur Dupur | Baby Naznin and Kanak Chapa |
