= Joydeep Mukherjee =

Indian former first-class cricketer (born 1967)

Personal information
- Born: 5 February 1967 (age 59); Calcutta, West Bengal, India
- Batting: Right-handed
- Bowling: Right-arm off break
- Relatives: Dilip Mukherjee (father)

Domestic team information
- Years: Team
- 1987/88–1994/95: Bengal

Career statistics
Competition	FC	List A
Matches	13	6
Runs scored	508	25
Batting average	46.18	8.33
100s/50s	0/4	0/0
Top score	79	22
Balls bowled	919	258
Wickets	9	0
Bowling average	54.33	–
5 wickets in innings	0	–
10 wickets in match	0	n/a
Best bowling	3/31	–
Catches/stumpings	7/–	1/–
- Source: ESPNcricinfo, 15 February 2016

Joydeep Mukherjee (born 5 February 1967) is an Indian former first-class cricketer who played for Bengal. He took up various coaching roles after his playing career.

== Career ==
Mukherjee was a right-handed batsman and occasional right-arm off break bowler. He appeared in 13 first-class and 6 List A matches, playing for Bengal and East Zone. He played for Bengal between 1987/88 and 1994/95 seasons.

Mukherjee became the cricket manager of the Indian Premier League team Kolkata Knight Riders in 2008 and remains with the franchise as a coaching staff as of 2015. As of February 2016, Mukherjee was the fielding coach of Bengal, head coach of the Bengal u-25 team, has also served as the Asst Coach of the senior Bengal Team. Since, 2018 he has been the Director - Cricket Operations at The Cricket Association Of Bengal. having previously worked as head coach of Bengal age-group teams. In IPL 2023, he was appointed the Team Manager of the IPL franchise, The Delhi Capitals. He also works as a television commentator. He is the son of the renowned Bengali film actor and director Dilip Mukherjee.
