= Khodar Pore Ma =

Bangladeshi action drama film

- Poster of Khodar Pore Ma
- Directed by: Shahin-Sumon
- Written by: Abdulla Johir Babu
- Produced by: Taposhi Thakur
- Starring: Bobita; Shakib Khan; Shahara
- Music by: Ali Akram Shuvo
- Distributed by: Heartbeat Production
- Release date: 20 August 2012
- Country: Bangladesh
- Language: Bengali

Khodar Pore Ma (Bengali: খোদার পরে মা) is a 2012 Dhallywood action drama film directed by Shahin-Sumon. The film features Bobita, Shakib Khan, and Shahara in lead roles. It was shot in April–May 2012, and was released on Eid al-Fitr of 20 August 2012. Upon release, the film received positive reviews and was commercially successful. Shakib Khan won the National Film Award for Best Actor for his role in the film.

== Plot ==
This is a story of a boy who got separated from his mother when he was quite young. Later he becomes a goon but tries to leave that life and get back to his mother.

== Cast ==
- Bobita as Munna's Mother
- Shakib Khan as Munna
- Sahara as Labena
- Misha Sawdagor as Sadda
- Don
- Kabila
- Nasrin

== Music ==
The music was composed by Ali Akram Shuvo.

== Accolades ==
At the National Film Awards for 2012, Shakib Khan won the Best Actor award for his role in Khodar Pore Ma.
