= Jona (actress) =

Bangladeshi actress

- জনা
- Occupation: Actress
- Spouses: Shakil Khan (m. 2002; div. 2003) Zubayer Hossain (m. 2009)
- Children: 2

Jona is a Bangladeshi film actress who has acted in more than 40 films.

== Biography ==
Jona made her debut in Dhallywood with Hridoyer Bashi where her co-star was Shakil Khan.

On 2002, Jona's first marriage with Shakil Khan did not last long. The former couple has a son named Aryan Khan and their marriage ended in divorce in 2003.

Then she married Zubayer Hossain on 14 February 2009. Jona is now living in the United States.

== Selected filmography ==
- Hridoyer Bashi (2002)
- Doctor Bari (2007)
- Biyer Logon
- Mon Chhuyechhe Mon
- Bazao Biyer Bazna (2010)
- Jonmo
