= Poddar prem =

Film of Bangladesh

Poddar prem Poddar valobasa
- an Official poster of 'Poddar valobasa ' for publicity
- Directed by: Harun-uj-jaman
- Written by: Harun-uj-jaman
- Produced by: Mohammad Sah Alam
- Narrated by: Harun-uj-jaman
- Cinematography: Mujibul haque Babul Roy
- Edited by: Sapon guho Tauhid hossen coudhury
- Music by: Sheikh sadi Khan; Osok dash
- Production company: Swapnachura film international
- Distributed by: Swapnachura film international
- Release dates: 20 September 2019 (India); 1 November 2019 (Bangladesh)
- Running time: 149 minutes
- Country: Bangladesh
- Languages: Bangla, Odia, Bhojpuri

Poddar Prem or Padmar Prem (also known as Padmar Bhalobasha) is a Bangladeshi full-length drama film released in 2019. The film tells the story of the life of a villager on the banks of the river Padma in the 1970s. The film is written, scripted and directed by Harun-uz-Zaman. The film is produced by Mohammad Shah Alam under the banner of Swapnachura Film International. The film is simultaneously made in Bengali, Oriya and Bhojpuri languages . On September 20, 2019, the film was released in West Bengal, India .
