= Amar Praner Swami =

Amar Praner Shami
- Movie poster
- Directed by: P. A. Kajol
- Produced by: Raithi Tokiz
- Starring: Shakib Khan; Shabnur; Nipun Akter; Don; Sadek Bachchu; Omar Sani
- Cinematography: Mobizul Hok Boia
- Edited by: Jamal
- Music by: Alluddin Ali
- Distributed by: Raithi Tokiz
- Release date: 10 August 2007
- Country: Bangladesh
- Language: Bengali

Amar Praner Swami (Bengali: আমার প্রাণের স্বামী; transl. My Beloved Husband) is a 2007 Bangladeshi romantic film directed by P. A. Kajol. It stars Shakib Khan, Shabnur, Nipun & many more. It was released on 10 August 2007 throughout Bangladesh. The film became the highest-grossing Bangladeshi film of 2007.

For the film Khan received his first Meril Prothom Alo Awards for Best Actor in Critics Choice category for his role Raju.

== Cast ==
- Shakib Khan as Raju
- Shabnur
- Nipun Akter
- Don
- Sadek Bachchu
- Omar Sani

== Music ==
The film's music was directed by Alluddin Ali.

=== Sound track ===
Track #	Songs	Singers	Lyrics	Notes
1	Tumi Amar Praner Shami	Shamina Choudhury and Kumar Bisjit		Title song
2	Age Jodi Jantam	Fardous Wahid & Shabina Isamin		
3	O Re Amar Pagla Mon	Andro Kishor and Rona Laila		
4	Shara Bangla Khuji Tomare	Baby Naznin & Omi		
5	Pakhi Amar Kotha Shone Na	Momotaz		
5	Mon Bujhlina Ora			

== Awards and nominations ==
- Meril Prothom Alo Awards for Best Actor (critics choice) – Shakib Khan (won)
