= PHP Quraner Alo =

PHP Qur'aner Alo: Protibhar Sandhane
- Sponsored by: PHP Family; Qur'aner Alo Foundation
- Date: 2007; 19 years ago
- Country: Bangladesh
- First award: 2007

PHP Qur'aner Alo: Protibhar Sandhane is a Quranic recitation competition organized by NTV in Bangladesh. The competition is held annually with sponsorship from PHP Family and the initiative of Qur'aner Alo Foundation. The first event was held in 2007. Many participants have since gone on to compete in international Quranic competitions. The main objective of the program is to honor the Hafiz of the Quran in Bangladesh and to spread the teachings of the Quran among the people.

== Prizes ==
The prizes for this competition vary from year to year. However, in 2019, the first-place winner received ৳4 lakh, the second-place winner received ৳3 lakh, and the third-place winner received ৳1 lakh. In addition, contestants who placed and their teachers are given the opportunity to visit the Kaaba and perform Umrah.
