= Shuva (film) =

Bangladeshi film

- DVD Cover
- Directed by: Chashi Nazrul Islam
- Based on: Shuvashini by Rabindranath Tagore
- Produced by: Impress Telefilm Ltd.
- Starring: Shakib Khan; Purnima; Chashi Nazrul Islam; Sujata; Tushar Khan; Saleh Ahemad
- Cinematography: Mujibor Rahman Bhuiya
- Edited by: Atiqur Rahman Mallick
- Music by: Imon Shah
- Distributed by: Impress Telefilm Ltd.
- Release date: 2005
- Running time: 120 minutes
- Country: Bangladesh
- Language: Bengali

Shuva also (Bengali: সুভা) is a Bangladeshi Bengali-language film, released in 2005

== Plot ==
Shuvaa was named Shuvashini, meaning 'one who has a melodious voice', but she grew up deaf and dumb. Her father married off her two elder sisters, Suhashini and Sukeshini, in grand ceremonies. Now it was Shuvaa's turn. Shuvaa and Protap, who were from the same village, understood each other. Protap asked his father to arrange their marriage, and his father went to Shuvaa's parents with a proposal. However, Govinda Goswami refused the proposal and insulted him. Insulted and refused, Banikonto left the village with his wife and daughter to marry off Shuvaa at his eldest daughter's house. Shortly after the wedding, Nibaron, Shuvaa's husband, learns of her condition, which causes her great misery.

== Cast ==
- Shakib Khan as Protap
- Purnima as Shuva
- Saleh Ahmed as Banikantha, Shuva's father
- Sujata as Rashmoni, Shuva's mother
- Tushar Ahmed Khan as Gobind Goswami, Protap's father
- Shajon as Nibaron, Shuva's husband
- Chashi Nazrul Islam as Kobiraj

== Crew ==
- Producer: Channel I
- Story: Rabindra Nath Tagore (Literature)
- Screenplay: Chashi Nazrul Islam
- Director: Chashi Nazrul Islam

== Music ==
The film's music was directed by Imon Saha.

=== Soundtrack ===
Tracks	Titles	Singers
1	Chander Hasi te Bhadh Venge jabe	Bappa Mojumder
2	Tumi Kemon Kore Gan Koro	Mita Haque

== Award ==
Lux Channeli performance award

- Nominate: Shakib Khan 2006 Critic
- Nominate: Shakib Khan 2006 People choice
