= Ahmed Humayun =

Bangladeshi journalist (1936–1999)

- Born: 18 May 1936; Baranagar, Calcutta, Bengal Presidency, British India
- Died: 23 July 1999 (aged 63)
- Education: MSc (Physics)
- Alma mater: Dhaka College; University of Dhaka

Ahmed Humayun (18 May 1936 – 23 July 1999) was a Bangladeshi journalist. He was awarded Ekushey Padak in 1987 by the Government of Bangladesh.

== Early life and education ==
Humayun passed secondary school examination from Mohini Kishore High School in 1953 and higher secondary examination from Dhaka College in 1956. He then earned BSc honors degree in 1958 and MSc degree in 1961 from University of Dhaka.
