= Chashi Nazrul Islam =

Bangladeshi film director

- চাষী নজরুল ইসলাম
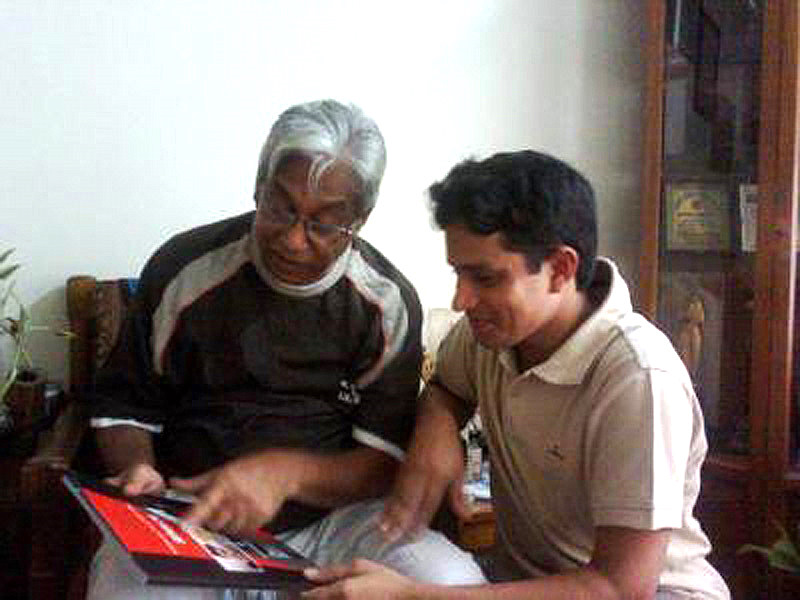
- Chashi Nazrul Islam with Director Zafor Firoze
- Born: 11 October 1941; Sreenagar, Bengal, British India
- Died: 11 January 2015 (aged 73); Dhaka, Bangladesh
- Occupations: Actor, director, producer, screenwriter
- Years active: 1963–2014
- Spouse: Kaniz Salma Islam (m. 1969)
- Awards: Ekushey Padak (2004)

Chashi Nazrul Islam (11 October 1941 – 11 January 2015) was a Bangladeshi film director and producer. He won the Bangladesh National Film Award for Best Director twice for the films Shuvoda in 1986 and Hangor Nodi Grenade in 1997. He was awarded the Ekushey Padak in 2004 by the government of Bangladesh.

== Early life and career ==
Nazrul Islam was born on 23 October 1941 at Shomoshpur village in Sreenagar Upazila of Munshiganj to Mosleh Uddin Khan and Shayesta Khanom. He was the eldest among four brothers and three sisters. His father was a service holder at Jamshedpur, India. At the age of 16, his father died. He got a job at the office of his uncle, the then auditor general of Pakistan. He was a member of the theatre organisation Krishti Sangha. After Nazrul Islam got laid off from that job, he started to perform on radio programs in 1965.

Nazrul Islam's brother-in-law, Syed Awal, who was the chief assistant of director Fateh Lohani, introduced him to Lohani. He was first cast in a minor acting role in Asiya (1961). He got his breakthrough as an assistant director to Obaidul Huq in the film Dui Diganto (1964). At the same time, he directed and voiced radio dramas, including Ramer Sumoti, Socrates, and Sakhina Birangana. In 2006, he directed Shuva, based on Rabindranath Tagore's novel Shuvashini, with Shakib Khan and Dilara Hanif Purnima, which was praised by critics and audiences. In 2013, he directed Devdas, based on the Sharat Chandra Chattopadhyay novel Devdas, who also directed the 1982 version, featuring Shakib Khan as Devdas, alongside Moushumi and Apu Biswas in the leading roles. It received a positive response from critics and a good opening at the box office, and won National Film Awards thrice at the 38th National Film Awards and was nominated in one category at the 16th Meril-Prothom Alo Awards.

Nazrul Islam served as the chairman of the Bangladesh Film Director's Association, and as a member of the censor board and of the joint production committee.

== Death ==
At age seventy-three, Nazrul Islam died of liver cancer at the Labaid Hospital in Dhaka, Bangladesh, on 11 January 2015. Two of his films were released after his death, Ontorongo (6 December 2015) and Bhul Jodi Hoy (8 January 2016).

== Filmography ==
Year	Film	Notes
1972	Ora Egaro Jon	First film on Bangladeshi Liberation War
1974	Sangram	
1975	Bhalo Manush	
1978	Bajimat	
1982	Devdas	
1985	Chandrakotha	
1986	Shuvoda	
1987	Lady Smuggler	
1987	Miah Bhai	
1987	Behula Lakhindar	
1988	Biraha Betha	
1988	Mahajuddha	
1989	Basona	
1990	Danga Fasad	
1991	Padma Meghna Jamuna	
1993	Desh Jati Zia	Documentary
1995	Ajker Protibad	
1995	Shilpi	
1997	Hangor Nodi Grenade	
2001	Hason Raja	
2002	Kamalpurer Juddha	
2004	Megher Pore Megh	
2004	Shasti	
2006	Shuva	
2006	Dhrubotara	
2011	Dui Purush	
2013	Devdas	
2015	Antaranga	
2016	Bhul Jodi Hoi	

== Awards ==
Year	Award Title	Category	Film
2009	Bachsas Awards	Life Time Achievement	
2005	International Kalakar Award	Best Director	–
2005	BCRA Award	Best Director	–
2004	Ekushey Padak	Contribution to Bangladeshi films	–
2003	Binodan Bichitra Award	Best Director	–
2003	Indo-Bangla Kala Music Award	Zahir Raihan Lifetime Achievement Award	–
2003	Trab Award		–
2003	Genesis Nazrul Honorary Award		–
2003	CJFB Award	Best Director	–
1997	National Film Awards	Best Director	Hangor Nodi Grenade
1997	Tarokalok Award		–
1995	Bangladesh Social Welfare Award		
1995	Zahir Raihan Gold Medal		
1995	Jagadish Chandra Basu Gold Medal		
1989	Bangladesh Film Critics Award	Best Director	Biraha Byatha
1989	Cine Directorial Social Welfare Award		
1989	Bangladesh National Youth Organisation Federation Award		
1988	Sher-e-Bangla Memorial Award		
1987	National Film Awards	Best Director	Shuvoda
1985	Cine Directorial Associates		
1974	Bachsas Awards	Best Director	Songram
