= King Khan (film) =

Bangladeshi action romance film

- King Khan Movie Poster
- Directed by: Mohammad Hossain Jaimy
- Written by: Mohammad Hossain Jaimy
- Produced by: Mohammad Korshad Alam
- Starring: Shakib Khan; Apu Biswas; Mimo; Misha Sawdagor; Uzzal; Sucharita
- Music by: Shawkat Ali Emon; Badhon; Javed Ahmed Kishloo; Ali Akram Shuvo; Anan; Sagir Ahmed
- Distributed by: TOT Films
- Release date: 7 November 2011
- Country: Bangladesh
- Language: Bengali

King Khan (Bengali: কিং খান) is a 2011 Dhallywood action and romance film written and directed by Mohammad Hossain Jaimy, and starring Shakib Khan in the lead roles. It also features Apu Biswas, Mimo, Misha Sawdagor, Ujjal, Sucharita, Kabila, Sadek Bachchu, Kazi Hayat, and Maruf Akib in supporting roles.

== Cast ==
- Shakib Khan as King Khan/Rakesh
- Apu Biswas as Munia
- Mimo as Jhumur
- Misha Sawdagor - King Khan (Fake)
- Asif Iqbal
- Ujjal
- Sucharita
- Kabila
- Sadek Bachchu
- Kazi Hayat
- Maruf Aqib

== Accolades ==
Meril Prothom Alo Award 2011

- Winner: Best Actor Shakib Khan

Uro-CJFB Performance Award 2011

- Winner: Best Actor Shakib Khan
