= Number One Shakib Khan =

- VCD Cover
- Directed by: Badiul Alam Khokon
- Written by: Paruchuri Brothers
- Produced by: Mohammad Hossain
- Starring: Shakib Khan; Apu Biswas; Nuton; Ali Raj; Misha Sawdagor; Annan
- Cinematography: Asaduzzaman Manzu
- Edited by: Zinat Hossian Zinha
- Music by: Ali Akram Shovo
- Distributed by: Grameen Films
- Release date: 11 September 2010
- Running time: 175 minutes
- Country: Bangladesh
- Language: Bengali
- Box office: ৳3 crore (equivalent to ৳7.9 crore or US$640,000 in 2024)

Number One Shakib Khan (also known as No1SK) (Bengali: নাম্বার ওয়ান শাকিব খান) is a Bangladeshi Bengali action comedy film directed by Badiul Alam Khokon. It is a remake of the 2002 Telugu language film Allari Ramudu. It was released in Eid-ul-Fitr 2010 and became one of the highest grossing Bangladeshi film of all time. The film stars Shakib Khan play the title role and 60% of this film was shot in Bangkok.

== Plot ==
The film focuses on a young man who struggles to stand on his own feet. Thrilled by his ideology and honesty, the heroine Apu Biswas makes up her mind to stand beside him with her love (Shakib Khan) to make his dream come true.

== Cast ==
- Shakib Khan as Shakib Khan aka Ali
- Apu Biswas as Rosy Chowdhury aka Rose
- Annan
- Nuton
- Ali Raj
- Misha Sawdagor
- Sadek Bacchu
- Prabir Mitra
- Rebeka Rouf
- Shiba Shanu
- Ilias Kobra
- Gangua
- Afzal Sharif
- Ratan Khan
- Siraj Haider
- Raju Sarkar
- Kala Aziz
- Abu Sayeed Khan
- Jadu Azad

== Soundtrack ==
Number One Shakib Khan

Soundtrack album by Ali Akram Shuvo
- Released: 2010
- Genre: Film soundtrack
- Producer: MD Hossin

The soundtrack of Number One Shakib Khan was composed by Ali Akram Shuvo and "Number one Shakib Khan" is one of the popular film songs of 2010 in Bangladesh.

=== Track listing ===
No.	Title	Artist(s)	Length
1.	"No.1 Shakib Khan (This song copied from Telugu song You Rock My World from movie Arya)"	S I Tutul
2.	"O Sathire"	Andrew Kishore & Kanak Chapa
3.	"Diyona"	Asif Akbar & Dolly Sayantani
4.	"Chai Nare Jomidari (This song copied from Telugu song A Vachhi B Pai Valli from movie Chatrapathi)"	S I Tutul & Razia Parvin
5.	"Kokila"	Asif Akbar & Baby Naznin

== Box office ==
- The film first released to 75 cinema hall which was the widest release of any Bangladeshi film till 2014. Few weeks later it released to 300 cinema hall gradually.

== Awards and nominations ==
Binodon Bichitra Award 2010

- won. Best actor: Shakib Khan

Uro-CJFB Performance Award 2010

- won. Best actor: Shakib Khan
- Won. for Best Story

Walton Boishakhi Star Award 2011

- won. Best actor: Shakib Khan

Babisas Award 2010

- won. Best actor: Shakib Khan
