= Munmun (actress) =

Bangladeshi actress

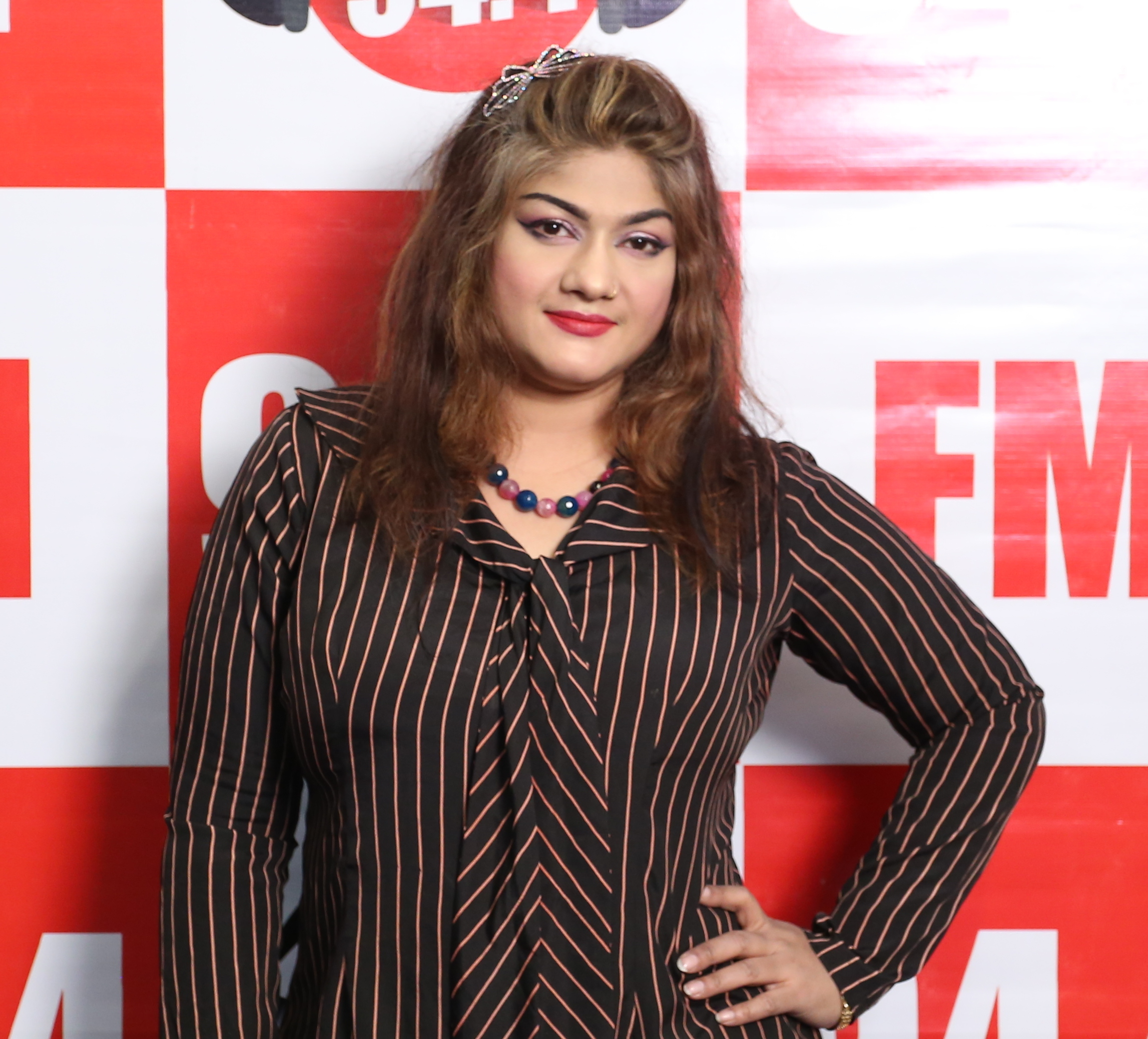
- Born: Munmun; September 30, 1981 (age 44); Rampura, Dhaka, Bangladesh
- Citizenship: Bangladesh
- Occupation: actress
- Years active: 1997– present
- Notable work: Raja (1999); Bishe Bhora Nagin (2000)

Munmun (born September 30, 1981) is a Bangladeshi actress who has appeared in 85 films. She started her career with the film Moumachhi (1996), directed by Ehtesham. She became one of the leading actresses of Bangladesh alongside Moushumi, Shabnur and Popy in the late 1990s till 2003. Her film include Raja, Dujonay (2000), Bishe Bhora Nagin (2000)

== Career ==
Munmun appeared in 85 films in her career. She was one of the leading actresses of Dhallywood from 1999 till 2003. She is accused of bringing obscenity and perversion to Bangladeshi films alongside actresses Moyuri and Jhumka. She went into self-retirement in 2006 citing that she is not willing to stretch her career amid the flow of perverted and cheap films.
