= Rajkumar (2024 film) =

2024 Bangladeshi film

- First look announcement poster
- Bengali: রাজকুমার
- Directed by: Himel Ashraf
- Written by: Himel Ashraf
- Story by: Himel Ashraf
- Produced by: Arshad Adnan
- Starring: Shakib Khan; Courtney Coffey; Tariq Anam Khan; Mahiya Mahi
- Cinematography: Sheikh Rajibul Islam
- Edited by: Simit Ray Antor
- Music by: Emon Chowdhury; Akassh; Prince Mahmud; Sajid Sarkar; Joel Van Dijk
- Production company: Versatile Media
- Distributed by: Versatile Media; Bongoz Films; Swapna Scarecrow Bangladesh
- Release dates: 11 April 2024 (Bangladesh); 19 April 2024 (North America); 25 April 2024 (Australia); 2 May 2024 (UAE)
- Running time: 145 minutes
- Country: Bangladesh
- Language: Bengali
- Budget: est.৳6 crore (US$490,000)
- Box office: ৳26 crore (US$2.1 million)

Rajkumar (Note: Bengali: রাজকুমার, romanized: rājkumār [raɟkumar]; transl. The Prince; It is non-ruling princely title for a son (sometimes more kin) of a Raja or equivalent royal prince in Southern Asia) is a 2024 Bangladeshi romance drama film directed by Himel Ashraf and produced by Arshad Adnan under the banner of his Versatile Media. The film revolves around the story of love, family relationships and a dreamy young man's journey from Bangladesh to America featuring Shakib Khan along with Courtney Coffey (in her Bangladeshi debut) in the lead roles. It is the second collaboration between Shakib Khan, Himel Ashraf and Arshad Adnan trio after success of Priyotoma (2023).

The principal photography of the film was commenced on December 12, 2023, with filming taking place in Dhaka, Pabna, Kushtia, Manikganj, Tangail, Gazipur and Rangamati in Bangladesh, Chennai in India and also 18 day in New York City. The film's cinematography was done by Sheikh Rajibul Islam with editing done by Simit Ray Antor and choreography handle by Adil Sheikh and Ashok Raja, with action directed by Rajesh Kannan. Its soundtrack was composed by Akassh, Prince Mahmud, Emon Chowdhury, Sajid Sarker and Joel Van Dijk while background music was done by Emon Saha.

The film is Khan's 249th film.The filming wrapped up on March 1, 2024 with a climax scene featuring Shakib Khan and Mahiya Mahi in Sajek Valley, Rangamati. The film was theatrically released on 11 April 2024, coinciding with Eid al-Fitr, which was met with mixed reaction from critics.

== Synopsis ==
The film follows the journey of a determined young man from a rural village in Bangladesh to the bustling streets of the US in search of his long-lost mother. Along the way, he navigates immigration hurdles, cultural differences, personal challenges, and unexpected encounters. The profound impact of his search leaves an indelible mark and shatters his life forever.

== Plot ==
The story starts in a small village in Bangladesh. Shamsur, who everyone calls Rajkumar, is a simple, dreamy young man. He is not like others — since childhood he has only one dream, to go to America. But he doesn't want to go to America for money or a job. He has a deep, painful reason.

His mother Khadija Begum left him when he was a child and went to America. His father never tells him the truth and always stops him from going, threatening to disown him. Rajkumar tries to get a US visa legally, but he fails the interview at the American Embassy 17 times. Everyone in the village laughs at him.

Desperate, a local broker tells him there is only one other way — you have to marry an American citizen. Through the broker, he meets Julie, an American woman. They do a contract marriage, and with her help, he finally lands in New York.

But in America, his real struggle starts. He doesn't know the language well, faces immigration problems, cultural shock, racism, and loneliness. Julie initially is just a contract wife, but slowly she starts to fall in love with this innocent village boy because of his honesty. Rajkumar also develops a friendship with her, but his heart is fixed on one mission.

That mission is — finding his mother Khadija Begum. He searches every street in New York, shows her old photo to everyone, goes from one Bangladeshi community to another. After a long, painful search, he finally finds her address.

The biggest twist comes there. When he finds his mother, he sees she has a new family in America, she is old and sick, and she had left Bangladesh due to extreme poverty and helplessness, not because she didn't love him. The meeting is extremely emotional — she can't believe her son crossed half the world after 30 years to find her.

The film ends tragically. Just after their reunion, his mother dies in his arms, leaving him completely shattered. He came to America to find his mother, and after finding her, he loses her forever. He realizes his whole journey, his dream, his love for Julie — everything changed his life forever. He returns to Bangladesh not as a failed visa applicant, but as a man who completed his life's purpose.

== Cast ==
- Shakib Khan as Shamsul "Sam" Haque / Rajkumar
- Courtney Coffey as Julie
- Tariq Anam Khan as Abdul Goni Miah, Sam's father
  - Arosh Khan as young Abdul Goni Miah
- Mahiya Mahi as Musammad Khadija Begum, Sam's mother (special appearance)
- Dilara Zaman as Musammad Rahima Khatun, Sam's grandmother
- Ejajul Islam as Signal Bhai, an expatriate Bangladeshi, who helped Sam move to United States
- Ahmed Sharif as Khabir Uddin, a freedom fighter of Bangladesh's independence war, who lives permanently in the United States
- Arfan Mredha Shiblu
- Saddam Maal
- Tanisa Islam Mahi
- DJ Shohel - Khaled
- Anwar Hossain
- Jadu Azad

== Production ==
=== Development ===
The director of the film Himel Ashraf has also written the story and screenplay of Rajkumar. He wrote the story of the film during the COVID-19 pandemic lockdown in the United States in 2020. He said that the story came to his mind when he went to United States in 2018, although he did not write it at that time. Then the whole time he stayed with the story of Rajkumar cinema. The director of photography in the film is Sheikh Rajibul Islam, who previously worked in No Bed of Roses (2017). Emon Chowdhury also worked as a music director. Quoting sources close to the film, Samakal confirmed that the film has been made with a budget more than ৳6 crores.

=== Pre-production ===
On November 14, 2017, at the 16th Channel i Music Awards held in New York City, the protagonist of the film Shakib Khan announced a new film from his own production company SK Films. He said that it will be directed by Himel Ashraf. Although the name of the film was not finalized at that time. Shakib Khan said, we have planned to made a big film here (US) for our Bangladeshi cinema industry with domestic and foreign technicians, artists. And had it not been for covid, it would have been shot for so long and released here. On the announcement of the film, director Himel Ashraf told Channel i Online, the story and screenplay of this new movie is mine. 70% of the movie will be shot in Las Vegas, Los Angeles, New York City and Hollywood sometime next year (2022). The rest of the shooting will be in Bangladesh. Then on March 28, 2022, the film's Maharat was held in World's Fair Marina, Queens, New York. The film's name and the actress' name were announced in Maharat. The film is titled Rajkumar were taken and American actress Courtney Coffey has been announced as the lead actress of the film. The film will be co-produced by Shakib Khan with Zakaria Masood and Kazi Riton, will be produced under Shakib Khan's SK Films banner, confirmed at the event. Shakib Khan said in the event that not only Bangladesh, "Rajkumar" will be released in different countries of the world including US, London, Middle East, Canada, India. Prothom Alo quoting the director Himel Ashraf's source, said that the filming of Rajkumar would begin in July 2022. The film's protagonist Shakib Khan was supposed to come to Dhaka on April 25, 2022 to participate in the filming, but in the end he did not come. Later he came to Bangladesh on 17th August on the year. After the massive success of Priyotoma (2023), produced by Arshad Adnan, in an interview with Channel i, director Himel Ashraf confirmed that Arshad Adnan will also produce Rajkumar. Later, Courtney Coffey came to Dhaka on December 9, 2023 to participate in the filming. Then on December 10, they participated in a photoshoot during Bangladesh President Mohammed Shahabuddin's 74th birthday event.

=== Casting ===
86 actresses expressed interest to be the lead actress of Rajkumar. Courtney Coffey said at the event of Maharat of this film, "I am grateful to be associated with this work. The movie is going to be a very beautiful story." She is learning Bengali language for the film, which she also confirmed by her Facebook post. In this regard the director said that as in the script Courtney Coffey in movie cannot speak fluent in Bengali language where she has mastered it well as per script required. Her seriousness is impressive. Veteran actor Tariq Anam Khan played the role of Shakib Khan's father in the film. The extent of Tariq Anam Khan's character in the film is about 15 minutes, which he confirmed in a press conference. Famous actress Mahiya Mahi was rumored to play Shakib Khan's mother in the film, which was later confirmed by The Daily Star. She participated in the final lot at Sajek Valley in Rangamati.

=== Filming ===
The film's shooting began on December 12, 2023 at Bangladesh Film Development Corporation, Dhaka with Shakib Khan and Courtney Coffey, with filming later in Pabna and then the United States. It has been reported that Rajkumar is being made based on the story of love, family relationships and a dreamy young man moving from Bangladesh to America. After filming of two small lots in Gazipur and Manikganj of Dhaka till December 14, actress Courtney Coffey returned to the United States on December 15. Then on December 18, the work of the second lot of the film started in Pabna. Director Himel Ashraf confirmed that the filming of the second lot will continue for 9 consecutive days in Pabna. In early January, Channel i reported that 30 percent shooting of the film has already been completed in the country. And by the end of this month, the remaining 70 percent will be shot at different locations in the US.

A song titled "Swapan Desher Swapan Noy Re" of the film was shot from January 30 to February 1, 2024 at Bangladesh Film Development Corporation, where a total of 300 dance artistes worked. It is choreographed by India's Ashok Raja, who has worked with Shakib Khan before. A three-minute fight sequence of the film cost around ৳10 lakhs, in which American and Russian artists worked. On February 3, 2024, the entire unit of the film went to the United States to participate in the filming of the final lot. Earlier, the fighting sequences were shot in Chennai, India. After a day's rest, the entire unit started shooting on February 5. On February 28, Shakib Khan and other crew members of the film returned to the country after filming for eighteen consecutive days in the United States. On the same day, he went to Sajek Valley, Rangamati to participate final lot of the filming, where some post-production work will be done, including patch work. After two days of filming of final lot in Sajek Valley, the film wrapped on March 1, 2024.

== Soundtrack ==
In January 2024, the director confirmed with Channel i that Emon Chowdhury had joined as music director, who reportedly composed the a track "Ami Ekai Rajkumar" penned by Ferari Forhad, which was shot in early-February 2024. The film's title track "Rajkumar" was released on March 28, 2024. The song is a duet sung by Balam and Somnur Monir Konal and composed by Akassh Sen with penned by Asif Iqbal, the four previously worked in the 2023 film Priyotoma. It is choreographed by renowned Indian dance director Adil Sheikh. The film's much anticipate second singles "Borbaad" was released April 2, 2024, which received massive response among the audience. The song is composed and penned by Prince Mahmud with voiced by debutant Alif. After the massive popularity and critical acclaimed of "Eshwar" from Priyotoma (2023), it is the second collaboration between Prince Mahmud and Himel Ashraf. Prince Mahmud told Bangla Tribune that he has tried to create a match of this period with the 90's in the lyrics and melody. Than third singles "Ami Ekai Rajkumar" was released on April 5 as the film's theme song, which sung by Shamim Hasan and composed by Emon Chowdhury with lyrics penned by Ferari Forhad. The song was filming in January, 2024 at Bangladesh Film Development Corporation with an approximately 300 dance-artistes have actively participated in the song's shooting, which choreographed by Ashok Raja and costume designed Farah Diba, which was dedicated to Khan fan-base Shakibian. The song was faced wide criticism for its lyrics, choreography, costumes, inconsistency of the actors lip-syncing with the song, eventually the director regretted the song. Zahid Akbar penned a song titled "Nishana" in the film, with Sajid Sarker composition, which his third consecutive collaboration with Shakib Khan.

Tracklisting
No.	Title	Lyrics	Music	Singer(s)	Length
1.	"Rajkumar"	Asif Iqbal	Akassh	Balam, Somnur Monir Konal	3:42
2.	"Borbaad"	Prince Mahmud	Prince Mahmud	Alif	4:04
3.	"Ami Ekai Rajkumar"	Ferari Forhad	Emon Chowdhury	Shamim Hasan	3:07
4.	"Maa"	Prince Mahmud	Prince Mahmud	Riyad	2:47
5.	"Nishana"	Zahid Akbar	Sajid Sarker	Rehaan Rasul
6.	"Down This Road"	Arzeen Kamal, Joel Van Dijk, Leah Van King	Arzeen Kamal, Joel Van Dijk, Leah Van King	Arzeen Kamal, Leah Van King
Total length:					13:40

== Marketing ==
The announcement poster of the film was revealed on March 29 2022. The first look poster of the film was revealed on March 24, 2024.

== Release ==
The film was screened at the Bangladesh Film Censor Board on April 3 and received an uncut clearance with 145 minutes the following day. The film was released in 127 theaters (Note: Most of the newspaper confirmed the theatre number. Although some other newspapers mentioned it 125 and 126 theatres.) nationwide on April 11, 2024 on the occasion of Eid al-Fitr 2024.

The film was released in 75 theaters across 31 states in the United States and Canada on April 19, 2024. However, it was released through Cinemark theaters in some notable locations like Los Angeles, the Bay area and Connecticut on April 26. It was initially slated to release in the United Arab Emirates on April 19, 2024 along with United States and Canada. But due to the terrible flood situation in Dubai, the censor show of the film was canceled twice. The film was later released in the Middle East on May 2, 2024.

=== Pre-bookings ===
On April 1, 2024, the advance ticket sale started 10 days before the film's release at Roots Cineclub in Sirajganj. Raj Cinema Hall of Kuliarchar, Kishoreganj and Borsha Cinema Hall, Gazipur took the booking of the film for ৳10 lakh, which is the highest booking record in the history of Bengali cinema. Besides, the film has been booked in the 22 largest single screens of the country for an amount of ৳8 lakh to a maximum of ৳12 lakh. Himel Ashraf confirmed that the film is given in minimum guarantee (MG) in most of theaters. It was reported that, the film released in record number of rentals in almost 125 theaters out of 210 theaters. It has earned a record several crores (approx. 6-6.5 crores) of booking money (table collection).

=== Distribution ===
The film was released in the US, Canada and the Middle East under the distribution of Swapna Scarecrow Bangladesh, which released Priyotoma by the same director last year.

== Reception ==
=== Box office ===
According to a report by Prothom Alo, Rajkumar earned approximately ৳1 crore (US$81,000) from overseas markets and grossed a total of ৳26 crore (US$2.1 million) worldwide, including its domestic earnings. This figure was also noted in a report by Independent Television, which highlighted the film among the top-grossing films of the first half of the year.

=== Audience ===
On April 9, the Multiplex authorities released advance tickets for all Eid films including Rajkumar, due to audience demand. With tickets sold for the first two days of the film's release at Star Cineplex, the country's most prominent theatre, expectations of a grand reception for the film are palpable. All the tickets for the film was sold out at Star Cineplex within a few hours of online ticket release. Apart from this, almost all the tickets of Rajkumar's shows are sold out on the first and second day of Eid in Bashundhara City, Dhanmondi, Mirpur, Chittagong, Rajshahi branches of Cineplex. The films gets 13 shows at the Star Cineplex, which the second highest number shows after Mishuk Moni's Deyale Desh. Later, 1 new show was added at Cineplex's Sony, 2 at Bangabandhu Museum and 1 new show at Rajshahi branch due to the demands of the audience. Its tickets are almost sold out in advance at Bashundhara and Sony branches on April 13. Also, 70 percent advance tickets have been sold at all of branches of Cineplex on April 14, the day of Pohela Boishakh. Apart from multiplexes, the film also dominated single screens in almost all the theatres of the country including Modhumita in Dhaka, Kuliarchar in Kishoreganj, Chittagong Sadar, Dinajpur on the day of Eid. On the first day of its release, the film received the expected response from the audience, with every show being a house full.

=== Critical response ===
Maruf Emon on Bengali Movie Database gives the film a 4/5 rating. He praises the actors' performances, cinematography, and the climax scene. However, he criticizes the excessive background music and the slow screenplay. In another review on the Bengali Movie Database, Fahim Muntasir rated the film a rating of 7 out of 10. He praised the story, screenplay, dialogue, and direction, particularly highlighting the climax scene. However, he criticized the makeup, soundtrack, and action sequences. Syed Nazmus Sakib mentioned in Desh Rupantor that the story of the film Rajkumar is remarkable. Along with the cinematography of the film, he also praised Khan's performance. He wrote, "With comic timing, subtle expressions, and a wonderfully controlled performance in emotional scenes, Shakib Khan was not just Shakib Khan here; he truly became Sam." However, he criticized the action choreography and makeup, and also noted the excessive use of the background score. The author, journalist, and poet Ahsan Kabir has rated the film 5 out of 10. He described it as a thought-provoking movie, acknowledging Shakib Khan's acting prowess. However, he noted that despite the commercial elements in the film, its narrative is not entirely modern. Filmmaker Sanjoy Somadder described to the film Rajkumar as larger than life. He praised its cinematography, dialogues, and supporting characters. He also particularly louded Shakib Khan's performance, considering arguably his best performance to date. He described Khan's acting in the climax scene as poetic. In a review featured in Kaler Kantho, Hridoy Ahmed lauded the film as a captivating and socially resonant piece. He commended its narrative depth, performances, dialogue delivery, cinematography, and evocative musical score. However, he also offered constructive criticism regarding the soundtrack, editing, and action sequences.

== Impact ==
It was ranked first among the upcoming film (including non-Bangladeshi films) in an audience poll a survey by the Star Cineplex.
