= Priyatama (disambiguation) =

Priyatama (transl. Sweetheart) may refer to:

- Priyatama, a 1977 Indian Hindi-language film starring Jeetendra
- Priyatama, a 2014 Indian Marathi-language film starring Siddhartha Jadhav

== See also ==
- Priyathama, a 1966 Indian Malayalam-language film starring Adoor Bhasi
- Priyotoma, a 2023 Bangladeshi film starring Shakib Khan
  - "O Priyotoma", a song from the film
