= NeelChokro =

2025 Bangladeshi film

NeelChokro: Blue Circle
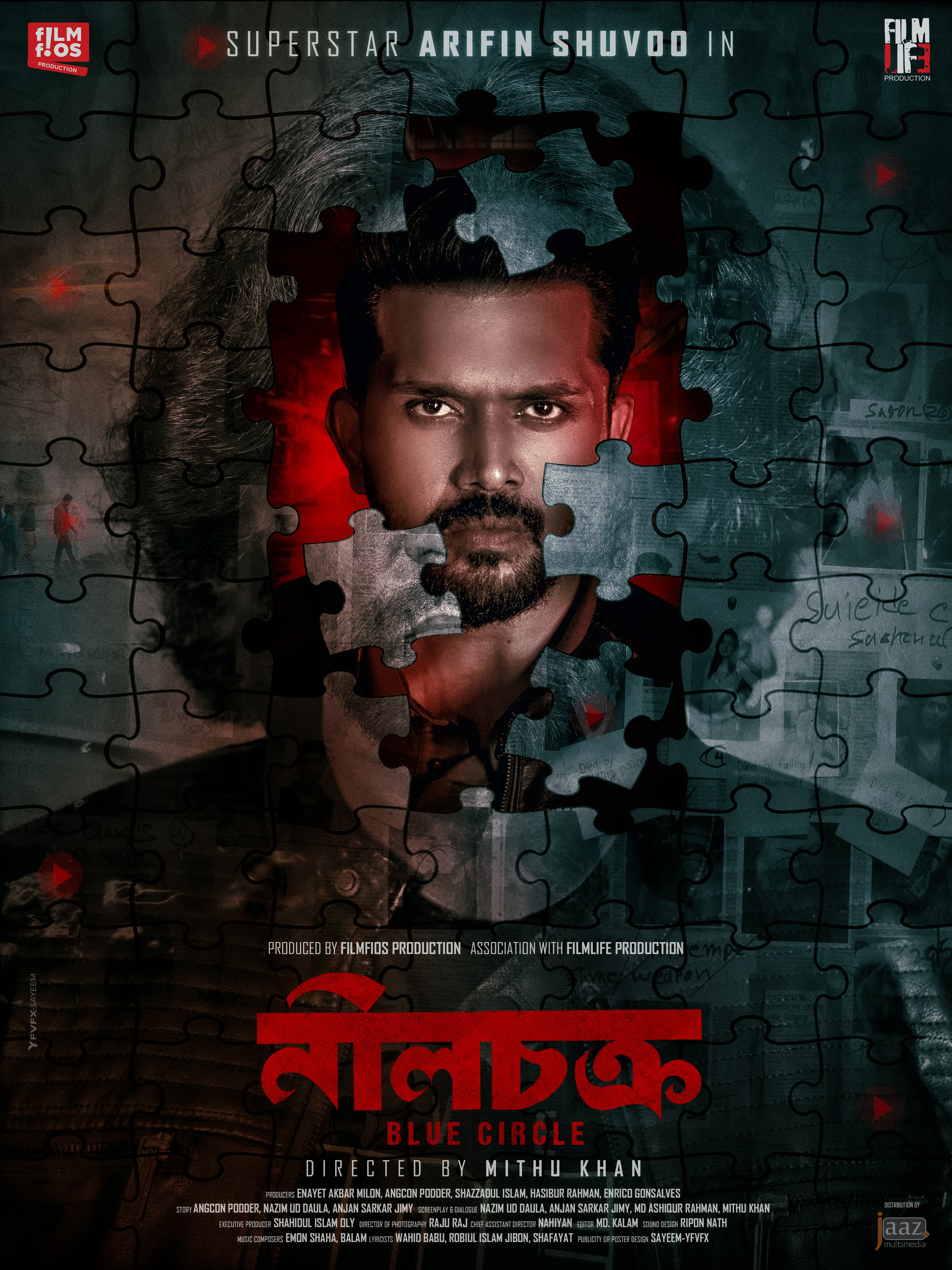
- Promotional poster
- Directed by: Mithu Khan
- Story by: Angcon Podder; Anjan Sarkar Jimy; Nazim Ud Daula; Mithu Khan
- Produced by: Enayet Akbar Milon; Angcon Podder; Sazzadul Islam; Hasibur Rahman; Enrico Gonsalves
- Starring: Arifin Shuvoo; Mondera Chakraborty; Fazlur Rahman Babu
- Cinematography: Raju Raj
- Edited by: Md. Kalam
- Music by: Balam; Emon Saha
- Production companies: FILMLIFE Production; FILMFIOS Production
- Distributed by: The Abhi Kathachitra
- Release date: February 20, 2025 (Golden State Film Festival)
- Running time: 113 minutes
- Country: Bangladesh
- Languages: Bengali; English

NeelChokro: Blue Circle (Bengali: নীলচক্র) is a 2025 Bangladeshi action thriller film directed by Mithu Khan, starring Arifin Shuvoo, Mondera Chakraborty, and Fazlur Rahman Babu, among others.

The film had its international premiere at the Golden State Film Festival in February 2025, and is scheduled for release in Bangladeshi theatres on Eid al-Adha, 2025. Renowned Bangladeshi singer Balam will make his debut on the big screen with the film. The film has been officially selected for the Foreign Language category at the 8th Golden State Film Festival 2025 in Los Angeles, US.

== Plot ==
A determined investigator uncovers a dark web of blackmail, suicides, and vigilante justice linked to a social media-driven prostitution ring. As he digs deeper, he discovers a greater conspiracy where justice and revenge collide.

== Cast ==
- Arifin Shuvoo as Faisal Shahriar
- Mondera Chakraborty as Raima
- Fazlur Rahman Babu as Samir Kanti
- Priyontee Urbee as Raisa
- Monir Ahmed Shakeel as Jack
- Shahed Ali
- Khaleda Aktar Kolpona
- Tiger Robi
- Masum Rezwan
- Balam
- Firoze Kabir Dollar
- Parvin Paru
- Nabil Ahmed Niloy
- Shahidul Islam Oly
- Shirin Alam
- Mayeha Ahmed Aditi
- Ishrak Turzo
- Imran Ahmed

== Production ==
=== Development ===
The film's lead actor, Arifin Shuvoo, collaborated closely with director Mithu Khan during the script development stage, and the two spent several months working together, discussing and shaping the story in detail. Shuvoo officially joined the project in November 2023.

Principal photography of the film took place over a span of two months, from January to February 2024. The production covered 33 different locations across Dhaka. During the shoot, lead actor Arifin Shuvoo faced a personal loss with the passing of his mother. Despite this, he returned to the set within a week.

The post-production process continued through May 2024. The film’s first-look poster was released on 3 May 2024, and the trailer is expected to be released in May 2025. A 19-second teaser is unveil on 25 April 2025.

== Music ==
NeelChokro

Soundtrack album by Various Artists
- Released: 2025
- Recorded: 2025
- Genre: Feature Film Soundtrack
- Language: Bengali
- Label: Tiger Media

Singles from NeelChokro
- 1. "Ei Shohorer Ondhokare" Released: 8 May 2025; 2. "Jete Jete" Released: 30 May 2025; 3. "Dhoka" Released: 5 Jun, 2025

No.	Title	Lyrics	Music	Singer(s)	Length
1.	"Ei Shohorer Ondhokare"	Jalali Shafayat	Balam	Jalali Shafayat	02:40
2.	"Jete Jete"	Wahid Babu	Emon Saha	Masha Islam	2:39
3.	"Dhoka"	Robiul Islam Jibon	Balam	Balam	2:22

== Release ==
=== Screening ===
The film was sold at the American Film Market in November 2024. It was also officially selected in the Foreign Language category at the 8th Golden State Film Festival in Los Angeles, USA, and was screened on 20 February 2025.

=== Theatrical release ===
The film received a "U" (unrestricted) grade from the Bangladesh Film Certification Board (BFCB) on 22 January 2025, and was officially listed on the board's website on 3 February 2025. The film was initially planned for release in August 2024, but was postponed due to the July Revolution in Bangladesh. Subsequently, it was released in cinemas across all over Bangladesh on 7 June 2025, coinciding with Eid al-Adha.
