= Chumma (song) =

- YouTube thumbnail for the music video, featuring actors Shakib Khan and Mim.

Single by Pritam featuring Jemi Yasmin and Bonny (RAP)

from the album Chumma (Original Motion Picture Soundtrack)
- Language: Bengali
- English title: "Kiss"
- Released: 28 January 2018 (video & single)
- Genre: Soundtrack; Latin; World
- Length: 3:29
- Label: Eskay Music; Shapla Media
- Composer: Akassh
- Lyricist: Sudip Kumar Dip
- Producer: Akassh

Chumma (Original Motion Picture Soundtrack) track listing
- 1. "Lal Lipstick"; 2. "Chumma"

Music video
- "Chumma" on YouTube

"Chumma" (English: Kiss) is a Bengali song from the 2018 Bangladeshi political drama film, Ami Neta Hobo. The song written by Sudip Kumar Dip and music directed by Akaash Sen. The song is sung by Pritam featuring Jemi Yasmin and Bonny (RAP). The music video of the track features superstar Shakib Khan and Bidya Sinha Mim. The song also choreographed by Tanjil Alam and Ramim Raj was the designer, Previously they work together in the song Lal Lipstick.

== Release and response ==
After releasing first song Lal Lipstick, the second song of the film was released on 28 January 2018 in the banner of Eskay Music. The song performed by Indian singer Pritam and Jemi Yasmin. The song also rap by Bonny. The track featured superstar Shakib Khan & Bidya Sinha Mim and the music video was shot in Bangkok. The video also received an overwhelming response on YouTube channel and becoming the fastest Bengali language video track that reach 1 million views within 36 Hours after Harabo Toke. The track received praises from audiences and critics.

== Critical reception ==
The song received mostly positive reaction from the music critics.

== See also ==
- O Priya Tumi Kothay
