= Shomeshwar Oli =

- সোমেশ্বর অলি
- Born: 29 December; Durgapur, Netrakona, Bangladesh
- Occupations: Lyricist, journalist
- Years active: 2007–present
- Spouse: Nusrat Jahan Ivy
- Awards: full list

Someshwar Oli (born 29 December) is a Bangladeshi lyricist, poet, journalist and dialogue writer. He is known for his work in Bangla films, television dramas and contemporary music. He wrote several popular songs, including Eshwar, Ghuri Tumi Kar Akashe Oro, and Tai Tomar Kheyal. He won the Bangladesh National Film Award for Best Lyricist in 2023.

== Early life ==
He was born on 29 December in Netrokona District. From a young age, he was interested in literature, poetry, and music. He later started his career as a lyricist and became active in the Bangladeshi music industry.

== Career ==
After working as a freelancer for three years, Oli started his first full-time job in 2007 as a sub-editor at Jaijaidin. He later worked for Samakal and online news outlets including thereport24.com & Banglanews24.com. He worked as a journalist for about a decade, mainly covering entertainment. In 2017, he left journalism and chose songwriting as his full-time profession.

Oli gained recognition through his work in modern Bangla songs, television dramas and films. He became widely known after the success of the song Ghuri Tumi Kar Akashe Uro sung by Lutfar Hasan.

He has written songs for many popular television dramas directed by Mizanur Rahman Aryan. His notable drama songs include Tai Tomar Kheyal, Buker Ba Pashe, Boro Chele, Veja Veja Chokh and Kokhono Na Kokhono.

Oli has also worked in Bangladeshi cinema. He wrote songs for films such as Priyotoma, Dard, Omar' and Unish20. His song Eshwar from the 2023 film Priyotoma became one of the most popular Bangladeshi songs of the year and won the Bangladesh National Film Award for Best Lyricist in 2023.

== Popular song ==
- Ghuri Tumi Kar Akashe Uro
- Eshwar
- Tai Tomar Kheyal
- Buker Ba Pashe
- Rupkothar Jogote
- Ayna Diye Ghor Bendhechi
- Maya
- Shunno Theke Ashe Prem
- Jora Shalik

Besides songwriting, he has also worked as a dialogue writer. He contributed dialogue to the films Ami Tomar Hote Chai and Ostitto.

== Filmography ==
- Priyotoma (2023)
- Unish 20 (2023)
- Dard (2024)
- Omar (2024)

== Book ==
- Kisuta Upor Theke Manush Dekhte Valo Lage, 2023

== Awards ==
Year	Awards	Category	Nominated work	Singer	Result	Ref
2023	Bangladesh National Film Awards	Best Lyricist	Eshwar, Priyotoma	Riyad	Won	
2023	Babisas Award	Best Lyricist	Eshwar, Priyotoma		Won	
2023	BFDA Award	Best Lyricist			Won	
2024	CJFB Performance Award	Best Lyricist			Won	
2022	Blender's Choice-The Daily Star OTT Awards	Best Lyricist			Won	
