= Tanjil =

Tanjil may refer to:

- Tanjil Bren, a town in Victoria, Australia
- Tanjil River, Victoria, Australia
- County of Tanjil, Victoria, Australia
- Tanjil Alam, professional dancer and choreographer from Bangladesh
