= Asif Iqbal (lyricist) =

Bangladeshi composer (born 1971)

- আসিফ ইকবাল
- Born: 12 October 1971 (age 54); Satkania, Chittagong, Bangladesh
- Education: University of Dhaka; Chittagong College Chittagong Collegiate School Saint Placid's High School, Chittagong
- Occupations: lyricist, composer and businessman
- Title: Founder & Owner of Gaanchill Music
- Parent: B. M. Faizur Rahman (father)

Asif Iqbal (born 12 October 1971) is a Bangladeshi lyricist and composer. He is one of the successful corporate personality in Bangladesh. He is the founder and owner of Gaanchill Music. He has been acclaimed for his multifaceted and innovative work in several renowned institutions of the country.

== Life and career ==
Iqbal was born at Kanchana Union under Satkania Upazila in Chittagong district. He has been writing songs for almost 30 years. He is most remembered for his film and album songs. In 2017, he was awarded Best Lyricist at 12th Channel i Music Awards. He was also selected as the best lyricist for the 7th BMJA "Music Awards - 2019" for 2019.

He penned the hit song Shada Ar Laal, sung by Asif Akbar and composed the soundtrack of Voyonkor Sundor, an Animesh Aich film. Naquib Khan, Bappa Mazumder, James, Partha Barua, Shakila Zafar, Kanak Chapa, Fahmida Nabi, Nazmun Munira Nancy, Dilshad Nahar Kona, Mahadi, Elita Karim, Rinku, Nishita Barua, Parvez, Ronti Das, Shafiq Tuhin, Balam, Sabbir have sung various songs written by him. In 2023, he penned "O Priyotoma" for the highest grossing Bangladeshi film of all time Priyotoma, with a Akassh composition and sung by Balam and Somnur Monir Konal, starring Shakib Khan and Idhika Paul. It received massive response from audience and crossed over 100 million views on YouTube in just three months. He was the Executive Director (Marketing) of Meghna Group of Industries. He is also the founder and owner of the music production company Ganchil. He has also taught in the marketing departments of the private Eastwest and Southeast Universities. Currently he works as the Group CEO of Hamid Group.

== Awards ==
- Channel i Music Awards 2017 - Best lyricist
- BMJA Music Award 2019 - Best lyricist
- Channel i Music Awards 2022 - Best lyricist
- & Creative Excellence Golden Globe Tigers Award
- Channel i Music Awards 2024- Best lyricist
