= Balam (singer) =

Bangladeshi singer

Balam বালাম
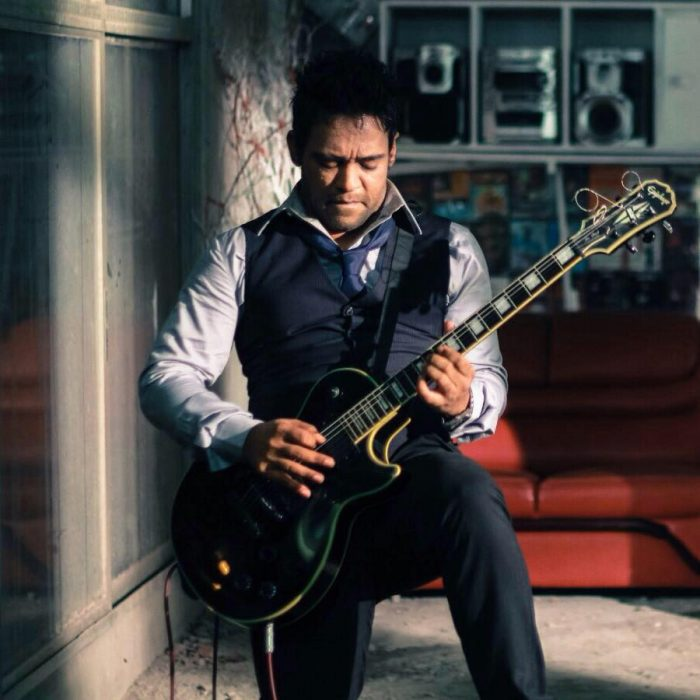
- Balam in 2018

Background information
- Born: Kazi Md. Ali Jahangir; 24 December 1976 (age 49)
- Occupations: Singer, Song Writer, Music composer & Producer
- Years active: 1995–present
- Formerly of: Warfaze; LRB

Kazi Md. Ali Jahangir, mononymously known as Balam, (born 24 December 1976) is a Bangladeshi singer, guitarist, composer, and music producer. He was born in Dhamaron village in Tongibari Upazila of Munshiganj (Bikrampur) district. He used to be the lead guitarist/vocalist for the band Warfaze. Later he introduced himself as a solo singer.

== Career ==
Balam started his career by forming the band Renegades after graduating from secondary school in 1995. He was the lead guitarist and main vocalist. The band published two albums - Onno Bhubon and Firiye Dao. Balam also worked as a guest artist in bands like Ark and Pentagon.

Three years later, he joined Warfaze as the lead guitarist and the second vocalist. In 2002, Sunjoy and Babna left the band for personal reasons. Balam then became the lead vocalist. He produced singles like "Jotodure" (a tremendously popular song), "Nei Tumi", and "Somoy" as a part of the band. Maharaj is one of the band's hit albums during this time period, of which Balam produced. Balam published his first featured album, Prem Shikari, in 2005 which gained him recognition.

In 2007, he left Warfaze and pursued a solo career. His debut solo album was self-titled. He continued with two consecutive albums Balam II and Balam III. During this period he also published two duet albums on which his sister Julee sang in his composition.

In 2013, his fourth solo album Bhubon was released. Afterward, Balam stopped working on new songs after facing rejection for his fourth album. Balam came back with his first HD music video "Meghey Dhaaka"in collaboration with Gaan Bangla Tv.. It received a huge response, and he started working regularly. "Koto Je Khujechi Tomay" was another duet music video.

In 2017, Balam published his fifth solo album, Golper Shohor.

Balam has also acted on two TV dramas and hosted a number of TV programs. He has also worked with various production houses and collaborated with the likes of Adit Rahman and other revered musical personalities. In 2023, he came back after almost 10 year with a playback for the highest grossing Bangladeshi film of all time Priyotoma named "O Priyotoma" with a Akassh composition, starring Shakib Khan and Idhika Paul.

== Solo albums ==
- Balam (2007)
- Balam II (2008)
- Balam III (2010)
- Bhubon (Balam IV) (2013)
- Golper Shohor (Balam V) (2017)
- Maola (2026)

== Albums with bands ==
- Onno Bhubon (Renegades)
- Firiye Dao (Renegades)
- Alo (Warfaze)
- Moharaaj (Warfaze)
- Shopnochura 3 (Balam feat. "Protikkha" by "Montro")

== Featured and mixed albums ==
- Prem Shikari (Balam featuring Julee, Ovi & Pintu)
- Balam featuring Julee (2008)
- Shopner Prithibi (Balam featuring Julee 2) (2009)
- Nari (Balam, Bappa, Labik, Habib & others)
- The Gurus Of Love (Balam, Habib, Fuad, Arnob)
- Ashik O Akota (Balam, Simin, Nazia, Shuddho & Ali)
- Adhar (Balam, X-Uranium, Bibhishika, Artonad, Slave and others)
- Adhar II (Balam, CynicX, Dhushor, Factor, Fear and others)
- Chayashoriri (Zia Khan Featuring Balam, Ayub Bacchu, Raghab Chattejee, Topu, Konal, Rupam Islam)
- Krishno kala by Rashed Khan (Balam feat. "Meye Tumi" & "Krishno kala")
- Ganer Michile (Ovi) (Balam feat. "Doyal" song)
- Fele Asha (Mila) (Balam feat. "Nirjon raat", "Fele Asha", "Chera Paal" & "Pora Bashi")
- Syntheya's self-titled album (Balam feat. "Smritir Sihoron")
- JUK's self-titled album (Balam feat. "Amar Nao Ore Asmane")
- Bristi Binimoy by Limon Chowdhury (Balam feat. "Mon Kharap")
- Nirjhorer Tanpura by Limon Chowdhury (Balam feat. "Badha")
- Chai tomay (Ibrar tipu) (vocal bonus track - "O prithibi")
- Bhorer Alo by Tanim Mahmud (Balam feat. "Tanim Mahmud")
- Ei shohorer ondhokare (Nilchakra movie) by Shafayet (Balam. feat. "Shafayet")
- Ei bashao by balam & konal of movie dard

== Playback and acting ==
- Bhalaobashar Golpo (film by Annono Mamun)
- Projapoti: The Mysterious Bird (film by Mohammad Mostofa Kamal Raz)
- Common Gender (film by Noman Robin)
- Hridoy Bhanga Dhew (film by Gazi Majharul Anwar)
- Amader Choto Shaheb (film by F. I. Manik)
- Chaad Ful Omabossha (TV soap by Arif Khan)
- Priyotomeshu (film by Morshedul Islam)
- Tomar Jonno (drama act with Srabonti and Apurbo)
- Golper Shohor (drama act with Sadia)
- Priyotoma (film by Himel Ashraf)
- Rajkumar (film by Himel Ashraf)
- NeelChokro (film by Mithu Khan)

== Other songs and TVC jingles ==
- Tumi Rupkothay ( released as music video )
- Digital Bangladesh ( released as music video )
- Meghe Dhaka (released as music video)
- Hotath (released as music video)
- Jodi bhul Kore (released as song in Yonder music app)
- Khepa Gaan (Aditation featuring Balam, Taufique and others)
- Mumin hote chai (Balam, Imran, Asif)
- Acho hridoye (T20 theme song-2014 with Adit, Tahsan & Samina chowdhury)
- Khola Akash (Balam featuring Anika Tasnim)
- Adure (Balam n Kona)
- Sylhet Superstar theme song (Balam with Tawfique (BPL-2015)
- Dekho hashi (Salman F Rahman-Bangladesh Awami league TVC)
- Jigwasha (Banglalink TVC)
- Ekanto apon (Navana Real Estate TVC)
- Smile (Grameenphone TVC)
- Medhabi Bangladesh (ACI salt TVC)
- Rajshahi Royals theme song(Balam) (BPL-2019)
- Chupchap caridik (released as music video)
- Jago Bangladesh Jago (Independent day song-2023)
- Nogode joy(Balam & Apeiruss)-ICC world cup theme song-2023
- Ki jaala( Taposh feat. Balam) -wind of change
- Noyona(Balam) released as music video
- Anutap by balam(Natok:Bhalobasa nai)

== Awards ==
- Coca-Cola Band Music Award - 1994
- Asean City Trab Award - 2006
- Meril Prothom Alo Awards – 2008
- Mejhab Award - 2007
- Dhaka Club Dhallywood Award - 2008
- Shadhin Bangla Cultural Award - 2008
- 4th citycell channel I award - 2008
- Mejhab Award - 2009
- 11th CJFB Performance Award - 2010 (Best Music Director)
- Channel i Music Awards 2024
