= Tanjil Alam =

Bangladeshi dancer

Md Tanjil Alam
- তানজিল আলম
- Born: 21 January
- Occupation: Choreographer
- Years active: 1999–present
- Website: www.eaglesdance.com

Md Tanjil Alam (Bengali: তানজিল আলম; born 21 January) is a professional dancer and choreographer from Bangladesh. He earned the Bangladesh National Film Award for Best Choreography in 2009 for Amar Praner Priya.

== Career ==
Tanjil's career as a dancer began in 1996, with multiple performances on stage, in movies, and on television. He formed the Eagles Dance Group with Sumon Rahman, Ifti Ahmed, and Oli Adnan in 1999. Since 2008, he actively worked as a dance choreographer under the company banner. He has done choreography for music videos and films, such as Chumma (song), Lal Lipstick, and Amar Praner Priya.

== Personal life ==
Tanjil is married to Sadia Islam Lamia since 13 June 2015.

== Filmography ==
- Amar Praner Priya (2009)

== Awards and nominations ==
Tanjil received the Bangladesh National Film Award for Best Choreography in 2009.
