= Bawal (film) =

2015 Indian Bengali film

- Bawal Bengali Film Official Poster
- Directed by: Biswarup Biswas
- Written by: Pavel
- Produced by: KR Movies and Entertainment, Jaspreet Kaur
- Starring: Arjun Chakrabarty; Ritabhari Chakraborty; Saayoni Ghosh; Biswanath Basu; Debasree Chakraborty; Partha Sarathi; Sanjay Biswas; Aninido Banerjee; Supriyo Dutta; Sanjay Biswas; Sumit Sammadar; Mishka Halim; Mainak Banerjee
- Cinematography: Premendu Bikash Chaki
- Edited by: Edit FX Studio; Susanta Chakraborty
- Music by: Akassh; Debanjan Banerjee
- Production companies: KR Movies and Entertainment Pvt Ltd
- Distributed by: KR Movies and Entertainment Pvt Ltd
- Release date: 12 June 2015
- Country: India
- Language: Bengali

Bawal is an Indian Bengali comedy-drama film released on June 12, 2015, directed by Biswarup Biswas Arjun Chakrabarty, Ritabhari Chakraborty, and Saayoni Ghosh start in the lead roles. As a Director Bawal is Biswarup Biswas's debut film and is a Bengali Film on comedy of errors.

== Cast ==
- Arjun Chakrabarty as Jishu
- Ritabhari Chakraborty as Subhasree
- Saayoni Ghosh as Nusrat
- Biswanath Basu as Subhasree's Brother
- Partha Sarathi
- Sanjay Biswas
- Aninido Banerjee
- Debasree Chakraborty
- Mishka Halim
- Supriyo Dutta
- Sanjay Biswas
- Sumit Sammadar
- Mainak Banerjee as the Artist

== Plot ==
Subhashri and Jishu are in love with each other but there is a crisis. Subhashri’s two elder brothers are very protective of her. After Subhashri’s parents’ death they have taken care of her like their own daughter. They did not even marry so that they didn’t have to share their love. Jishu makes a plan pacify Subhashri’s brothers by joining them as their assistants in work Also this would allow him to be closer to Subhashri. Jishu gets into the good books of both but not enough to ask Subhshri’s hand in marriage. Jishu and Subhashri decide that they should run away and get married and once they get married the brothers won’t be able to do anything about it. Jishu asks Subhashri to stand at the bus stand in Burkha with a rose in her hand and Jishu will make sure to come and pick her from there.

Jishu frames a story to the brothers that he is in love with some other girl. But her family members object to it because of religious differences. And will kill both him and the girl in the name of honour killing. As Jishu has no one other than them, he needs their help urgently. They have to wait in the market in disguise (at separate locations) and pick his girl friend who will be wearing a Burkha holding a rose in her hand. After they pick the girl, they have to call Jishu to inform this. Jishu comes to the market to check that the two brothers are waiting there in disguise. Jishu leaves and goes to the bus stop. He calls a taxi and drags Subhashri holding her hand in the taxi.

He finds that two big cars are following them. To his shock he finds the girl beside him draws the Burkha cover from her face and it is not Subhashri. This girl is Nusrat and she is the sister of the two most infamous Dons of the city. Jishu is now in trouble as he has eloped with the wrong girl. What follows next is comedy of errors. Will Jishu be able to get the love of his life? Will the two brothers agree to wed their only sister with a loser? Will the Dons spare Jishu for touching and kidnapping their sister? The story unfolds a lot of fun and BAWAL.

== Music ==
The music of the film has been composed by Akaash. The song "Du chokhe tor swapne" is a romantic song that has won so many hearts.

#	Title	Singer(s)	Music director	Lyricist
1	"Du chokhe tor swapne"	Akassh	Akassh	Priyo Chatterjee
2	"Oh darling"	Prasenjit Mallick	Akassh	Priyo Chatterjee
3	"Bawal title track"	Akassh	Akassh	Priyo Chatterjee
4	"Hobe Na Bawal"	Rupankar Bagchi	Debanjan Banerjee	Debanjan Banerjee
