= Golemale Pirit Koro Na =

2013 Indian Bengali film

- Directed by: Anindya Banerjee
- Screenplay by: Anuja Chatterjee
- Story by: Anuja Chatterjee
- Produced by: Rajib Mehra
- Starring: Jisshu Sengupta; Payel Sarkar; Ritwick Chakraborty; Kanchan Mullick
- Cinematography: R. Bhagat
- Music by: Akassh
- Release date: 2 February 2013 (Kolkata)
- Running time: 150 minutes
- Country: India
- Language: Bengali

Golemale Pirit Koro Na (sometimes Goley Maley Pirit Korona, Goley Maley Pirit Koro Na or Golemale Pirit Korona) is a 2013 Bengali film. The film was directed by Anindya Banerjee and produced under the banner of Shree Venkatesh Films. The film's music was composed by Akash. The film was released on 8 February 2013. The comedy film is based on the story of two men who fell in love with each other's sisters.

== Plot ==
Two men, Gouranga and Gobindo, meet in a nightclub and strike up a friendship and their cell phones get exchanged. When Gobinda comes to return the phone to Gouranga, he discovers that Gouranga has a cousin called Banya who is obsessed with Salman Khan and with the name called Prem and desires a boyfriend called Prem. So, he becomes Prem to impress her. Gouranga also lands up at Gobinda's house and discovers that he has got a sister called Rai who desires a boyfriend called Prem and so he too becomes Prem too impress her. Just when the confusion had started, there was a complete chaos. Banya lands up at Gobindo's place and discovers he is not Prem. Her dominating mother lands up there with her helping hand, Kandarpo, who is the would-be-suitor for Banya. Just when he reveals facts like Gobindo being an adopted son, it turns out to be much more than that and finally it is seen that Gobindo and Gouranga are brothers and so Banya is their cousin and therefore Gobindo can't be with Banya anymore. Even after that something else was revealed - Banya's mother and Gobindo and Gouranga's mother were never sisters, but best of friends!

== Cast ==
- Jisshu Sengupta as Gobindo
- Ritwick Chakraborty as Gouranga
- Payel Sarkar as Banya
- Kanchan Mullick as Kandarpo
- Sudipa Basu as Banya's mother
- Manasi Sinha as Smritiparna, mother of Gobindo and Gouranga
- Subhrajit Dutta as the cop
- Sumita Das as Rai
- Kharaj Mukherjee as Jagannath
- Bratya Basu as Nebu Kaka, Gobindo's uncle
- Rajatava Dutta (Special appearance)

== Soundtrack ==
Golemale Pirit Koro Na

Soundtrack album by Akash
- Genre: Feature film soundtrack
- Producer: Shree Venkatesh Films

The soundtrack of Golemale Pirit Koro Na is composed by Akash. The film has 5 original songs which are sung by singles as well as in duets.

=== Track list ===
No.	Title	Singer(s)	Length
1.	"Golemale Pirit Koro Na"	Akash	4:00
2.	"Ding Dong"	Mallar Karmakar, June Banerjee	3:48
3.	"Elo Re Elo Prem"	Javed Ali, Nilakshi Bhattacharya	3:53
4.	"Shudhu Bolte Chai"	Mallar Karmakar, Akash	3:59
5.	"Baby I Miss You"	Javed Ali, Nilakshi Bhattacharya	3:32
Total length:			19:02

== Critical reception ==
Professional ratings
Review scores
Source	Rating
"Timescity.com".	2/5 stars
"Gomolo.com". Archived from the original on 8 March 2013.	2/5 stars
"The Times of India".	2/5 stars

Golemale Pirit Koro Na received mixed reviews from critics. However, the soundtrack of the film gained positive compliments. As a whole, the film was an average.

The critics of The Times of India said -

Mistaken identities, ideal love and a whole lot of confusion. Goley Maley Pirit Koro Na, Anindya Banerjee's comedy that took two years to see the light of the day, can be summed up in these three phrases. The film showed promising signs - it's myriad plots and sub-plots are held together by a wittily written narrative - sadly, that's not enough to create a blockbuster. There are stock characters - the forgetful governess, the bumbling cook, the country bumpkin uncle and love-struck women - but it's the protagonists who let us down. Jisshu Sengupta is the harassed son. A lot is expected of him - managing the family's fortune in the village of Chyangrapur (yes, that's what the village is called), looking for the ideal husband for his sister and even managing labour union problems. Unable to cope with these vicissitudes, Jisshu flees to the city every weekend to meet his fictitious friend, Prem. As if one set of problems wasn't enough back home, Jisshu goes around looking for more in the city. He becomes 'Prem' and befriends city lad Ritwik Chakraborty. Payel, the lead actress, is Ritwik's lovestruck sister, mad about Prem - the Salman Khan kind. But when she meets the Prem of the city, it's 'prem' (love) at first sight. Confused already? Here's more. As if to balance two sides of the equation, the director makes Ritwik's character let himself loose in Chyangrapur. There, quite predictable, he stumbles upon Jisshu's lovestruck sister who mistakes him for Prem, her Prem. The first half of the film manages to set the premise for the second half by successfully transferring the characters where they ought to be in order for the plot to move ahead. The second half begins on a positive note. Comic relief in the form of Bratya Basu's Nebu Kaka - the country bumpkin uncle and Ritwik's interactions with Jisshu's family members keeps one engaged. The romantic numbers - Elo Re Elo Prem Elo Jibone and the very retro Ding Dong are melodious and hummable. The director is bang on target when it comes to shooting locations, flitting back and forth between Kolkata and North Bengal. The song, Elo Re Elo Prem Elo Jibone, shot in a picturesque Pattaya, the narrative and a particular dream sequence are the only high points of this blockbuster that never was.

== See also ==
- Namte Namte, a 2013 Bengali-language films
