= O Priyotoma =

Single by Akassh featuring Balam and Somnur Monir Konal

from the album Priyotoma
- Language: Bengali
- English title: Oh Dear
- Released: 27 June 2023
- Recorded: 2023
- Studio: Tiger Media
- Genre: Soundtrack; Filmi; world; pop; soft-rock
- Length: 4:17
- Label: Tiger Media; The Abhi Kathachitro
- Composer: Akassh
- Lyricist: Asif Iqbal
- Producers: Akassh; Arshad Adnan

Priyotoma track listing
- 4 tracks: 1. "Qurbani Qurbani"; 2. "O Priyotoma"; 3. "Eshwar"; 4. "Govire"

Music video
- "O Priyotoma" on YouTube

"O Priyotoma" (Bengali:"ও প্রিয়তমা ") is a Bangladeshi Bengali-language duet song sung by Balam and Somnur Monir Konal and composed by Akassh from the 2023 soundtrack album Priyotoma of the film of the same name, starring Shakib Khan and Idhika Paul. The song is written by Asif Iqbal. The song was released on 27 June 2023. The music video for the song was released on the same day under the music label Tiger Media.

The song was released on 27 June 2023 as a second single from the soundtrack and fastest Bengali-language song to crossed 100 million views on YouTube. Also the first Bengali-language film song to ranked 35 on the Global Top Music Videos chart and 83 on the Global Top Songs chart. Balam made his comeback in playback after almost ten years with the song. For which Somnur Monir Konal won Babisas Award for Best Female Playback Singer.

== Release ==
The song was released on 27 June 2023 as a second single from the soundtrack, where Shakib Khan and Idhika Paul are seen for the first time.

== Music credits ==
Credits adapted from Tiger Media.

- Akassh – composer, programmer, arranger
- Asif Iqbal – lyricist
- Balam and Somnur Monir Konal– vocals
- Bob SN – programing
- Babni – Guitar, Mandolin & Banjo

== Reception ==
=== Audience response ===
Upon the release of the song, it gained massive response from critics and audiences. Shakib Khan and Idhika Pal's chemistry in the song created a craze among the audience and started trending on social media including Facebook, YouTube and TikTok. Apart from the chemistry between Shakib Khan and Idhika Paul, Balam has especially attracted the attention of the audience in this song. He made his comeback almost 10 years with the song, as a result, after listening to the song, many listeners are full of praise for Balam. As of April 2024, it has over 160 million views on YouTube in just 10 months.

=== Critical reviews ===
Tirthok Ahsan Rasel described the film's song as "superhit". No one should be forced to listen. Some songs have the potential to survive as songs for many, many years. The songs are also very comfortable to listen to. However, he criticized the song's video as a "music video". Rahman Moti praised the film's soundtrack. He wrote, the title track has done in Simple Way was a good song. Sea location added extra dimension to the film. Rupam Acharya described all the songs in the film as "simply amazing".

== Live Performances ==
Balam and Somnur Monir Konal performed the song as a duet at the 47th National Film Awards.

== Impact ==
The song crossed a million views on Tiger Media's YouTube in just seven hours after its release! More than 2.2 million views on YouTube in 24 hours, and more than 3.2 million views from Shakib Khan's official page in less than 24 hours. Also was trending on Facebook, YouTube and TikTok. It crossed 100 million views on YouTube in just three months, becoming the fastest Bengali-language film song to reach the milestone. It has started no.1 trending on YouTube in Bangladesh after 13 days of its release for 10 consecutive days. Also it was the first Bengali film song took ranked 35 on the Global Top Music Videos chart, which was for a consecutive month and a half and 83 on the Global Top Songs chart. The song was selected as the best song of 2023 by many of Bangladeshi media. Also its Singers, Lyricist and Composer was also selected as Best of the Year.

== Awards and nominations ==
Year	Events	Category	Nominee	Result	Ref
2023	Babisas Award	Best Female Playback Singer	Somnur Monir Konal	Won	

== Controversy ==
A prominent Bangladeshi singer named Shuvro Dev has alleged that some verses of his song "A Mon Amar Pathor To Noy" are similar to "O Priyotoma".
