= Ami Neta Hobo =

2018 film

- Official Poster
- Directed by: Uttam Akash
- Written by: Jakir Hossin Raju
- Produced by: Salim Khan
- Starring: Shakib Khan; Bidya Sinha Mim; Omar Sunny; Moushumi; Sadek Bachchu; Shiba Shanu
- Music by: Akassh; Ali Akram Shuvo; Shree Pritam; Ahamed Humaun
- Production companies: Shapla Media; Eskay Movies
- Distributed by: Shapla Media; Eskay Movies
- Release date: 16 February 2018
- Running time: 160 minutes
- Country: Bangladesh
- Language: Bengali

Ami Neta Hobo (Bengali: আমি নেতা হবো); is a 2018 Bangladeshi political drama film directed by Uttam Akash and produced by Selim Khan. The film stars Shakib Khan and Bidya Sinha Mim in the lead roles. The cast also includes Omar Sunny and Moushumi. The film is produced by Shapla Media and Indian production house Eskay Movies.

The film is also the second collaboration between Shakib Khan and Mim, who have previously appeared together in the film Amar Praner Priya in 2009. The film was released on 16 February 2018.

== Cast ==
- Shakib Khan as Shakib Khan Sakku
- Bidya Sinha Mim as Sundori
- Omar Sunny as Sakku's brother in law
- Moushumi as Sakku's sister
- Sadek Bachchu as Akkas Bepari
- Kabila as Kabila
- Shiba Shanu as
- DJ Shohel
- Amir Siraji
- Siraj Haider
- Md Jakir Hossain as (Actor) Raju

== Soundtrack ==
The soundtrack of Ami Neta Hobo is composed by Akassh, Ali Akram Shuvo, Shree Pritam and Ahamed Humaun. The first song from the soundtrack, the item song "Lal Lipstick", is sung and composed by Akassh and also features Trisha Chatterjee. The second track of the film Chumma was released on 28 January 2018, in the banner of Eskay Music. The film third song Im in Love was released on 14 February 2018, on the occasion of Valentine's Day and also last song Ghurchhi Ajo Pothe Pothe was released a few days later.

Ami Neta Hobo

Soundtrack album by Akassh, Ali Akram Shuvo, Shree Pritam & Ahamed Humaun
- Released: 2018
- Genre: Film soundtrack
- Label: Eskay Movies
- Producers: Akassh; Ali Akram Shuvo; Shree Pritam; Ahamed Humaun

Akassh chronology
Nabab (2017)	Ami Neta Hobo (2018)

Ali Akram Shuvo chronology
Ohongkar (2017)	Ami Neta Hobo (2018)

Shree Pritam chronology
Khiladi (2013)	Ami Neta Hobo (2018)	Tui Amar Rani (2019)

=== Track listing ===
No.	Title	Lyrics	Music	Artist(s)	Length
1.	"Lal Lipstick"	Priyo Chattopadhyay	Akassh	Trisha Chatterjee & Akassh	3:29
2.	"Chumma"	Sudeep Kumar Deep	Shree Pritam	Shree Pritam, Jemi Yasmin, Bonny (RAP)	3:24
3.	"I'm in Love"	Sudeep Kumar Deep	Ahamed Humaun	Shaan and Monali Thakur	3:52
4.	"Ghurchhi Ajo Pothe Pothe"	Sudeep Kumar Deep	Ali Akram Shuvo	Dinat Jahan Munni	4:25
5.	"Ami Neta Hobo"		Ali Akram Shuvo		3:10
