= Cholai (film) =

2016 film

- Directed by: Arun Roy
- Produced by: KR Movies and Entertainment, Jaspreet Kaur
- Starring: Saswata Chatterjee; Nimai Ghosh; Goutam Halder; Shankar Chakroborty; Partho Sarathi; Miska Halim; Debanjan Nag; Kharaj Mukherjee; Sumit Samaddar; Rayati Bhattacharya
- Cinematography: Gopi Bhagat
- Edited by: Sanglap Bhowmik & Edit FX
- Music by: Mayukh & Mainak
- Release date: 2 December 2016
- Country: India
- Language: Bengali

Cholai is an Indian Bengali dark comedy film released in 2016. The film is based on the 2011 hooch fatalities. in Bengal, India. Unlicensed Country liquor, commonly known as ‘Cholai’ is a prosperous business in rural Bengal, since it is very inexpensive and highly addictive.

== Plot ==
Skaktipada is a reputed teacher in his village with three sons. The eldest son, Nimai, sells milk for a living. The second son, Nitya, has been absconding for a year, due to fraudulent activity. Skaktipada's youngest son, Nata, makes alcohol and his disputed reputation has grown beyond the area's boundaries. His alcohol is especially harmful and addictive, due to the inclusion of pesticides.

Nata and his wife work to keep the business afloat. One day, both of them accidentally mix the normally smaller amount of pesticides into the alcohol during the brewing process, with neither realizing the mistake. This leads to the deaths of 172 people.

Overnight, this creates backlash in the village and the media picks up the story, spreading it further. To mitigate unrest, the government declares a lucrative compensation of 2 lakhs for the families of the dead. Excitement peaks with the announcement and various people, from the doctor in the morgue to the carriers of the dead bodies, become conscious of the compensation amount and demand a share for themselves.

Meanwhile, a parallel incident soon draws public attention, when the government declares another compensation package to the families of the Maoist workers who are going to surrender. To the surprise of the villagers, Shaktipada’s long-unseen second son, Nitya, has been seen in line with other Maoist activists, trying to receive compensation.

Sumitra, Nata’s wife is disheartened to see his brother-in-law get this kind of money, feeling that the government is providing money to people who kill others. Since Nata has killed 172 people, she feels he should be entitled to compensation, as well. She convinces Nata, who surrenders to the government, seeking a pardon and compensation to start a new life.

Now only the eldest son, Nimai the milk seller, finds himself at a loss. His wife begins to pressure him to learn from his brothers, who now have both fame and money, and to do something drastic to change his life and gain his own fame and fortune.

== Cast ==
- Saswata Chatterjee as Minister
- Kharaj Mukherjee as Bus Passenger
- Partha Sarathi as Nata
- Sandip Ghosh as Nimai
- Sumit Sammadar as Bishu
- Shankar Chakraborty as Doctor
- Mishka Halim
- Goutam Halder
- Swapna Dey
- Sneha Biswas
- Subhomay Chatterjee
- Rayati Basu
- Sounava Basu
- Arunima Ghosh

== Crew ==
- Produced By: Jaspreet Kaur
- Production House: KR Movies & Entertainment Pvt Ltd
- Creative Producer: Pavel
- Directed By: Arun Roy
- Screenplay: Arun Roy
- Dialogues: Subhomay Chatterjee
- cinematography: Gopi Bhagat
- Music Director: Mayukh & Mainak
- Editor: Sanglap Bhowmick & Edit FX

== Music ==
Music for the film was composed by Mayukh & Mainak.

== Recognition ==
Cholai has been screened at several prestigious International Film Festivals, including at the prestigious Cannes Film Festival and 7th Jagran Film Festival. Cholai was nominated for the 63rd National Film Awards and was also nominated in six categories at the Madrid IFF 2016 and won 1 award. The movie was officially selected for the Indian Film Festival, of Melbourne, Australia. Cholai was well-received internationally. Cholai wins two film fare awards in the Jio Filmfare Awards (East) 2017. It secured the awards for Best Dialogue (Subhomay Chatterjee) & Critics' Best Film (Arun Roy).
