= Uttam Akash =

Bangladeshi film director and screenwriter

- উত্তম আকাশ
- Born: August 7, 1968 (age 57); Chandpur, Bangladesh
- Occupations: Film director and screenwriter
- Notable work: Ami Neta Hobo
- Spouse: Shayla Parveen (m.1992)
- Awards: Bangladesh National Film Awards for Best Director

Uttam Akash (Bengali: উত্তম আকাশ) is a Bangladeshi film director and screenwriter. His debutante film Muktir Sangram was released in 1995.

== Career ==
Akash made his debut in the Bangladesh film industry with Muktir Sangram which released in 1995. His most known films are Muktir Sangram (1995), Ora Dalal (2004), Mumtaz (2005), Tui Jodi Amar Hoiti Re (2006), Danob Shontan (2007, Bhalobasha Dibi Kina Bol (2012), Dhaka to Bombay (2013), Ek Jobaner Zamidar, Here Gelen Eibar (2015), Dhakaiya Pola, Borishaler Maiya (2015), Raja 420 (2015), Ami Neta Hobo (2018), and the very recent one (Chittagainga Poa, Noakhaila Maiya (2018). Akash has received and have been nominated for plenty of Bangladeshi National Film Awards for Best Director. There were other unspecified National TV Awards that Akash has won.

== Filmography ==
- Muktir Sangram (1995)
- Ke Oporadhi (1997)
- Sabbas Bangali (1998)
- Ora Dalal (2003)
- Momtaz (2005)
- Vondo Ojha (2006)
- Tui Jodi Aamar Hoiti Re (2006)
- Danob Shontan (2007)
- Bhalobasha Dibi Kina Bol (2012)
- Dhaka to Bombay (2013)
- Ek Jobaner Zamindar, Here Gelen Eibar (2015)
- Raja 420 (2015)
- Dhakaiya Pola, Borishaler Maiya (2015)
- The father of Nation (2017)
- Ami Neta Hobo (2018)
- Chittagainga Powa Noakhailla Maiya (2018)
- Dhushor Kuasha (2018)
- Keu Kotha Rakhena (2018)
- Boyfriend (2019)
- Prem Chor (2019)
