= Jaspreet Kaur =

Indian film producer

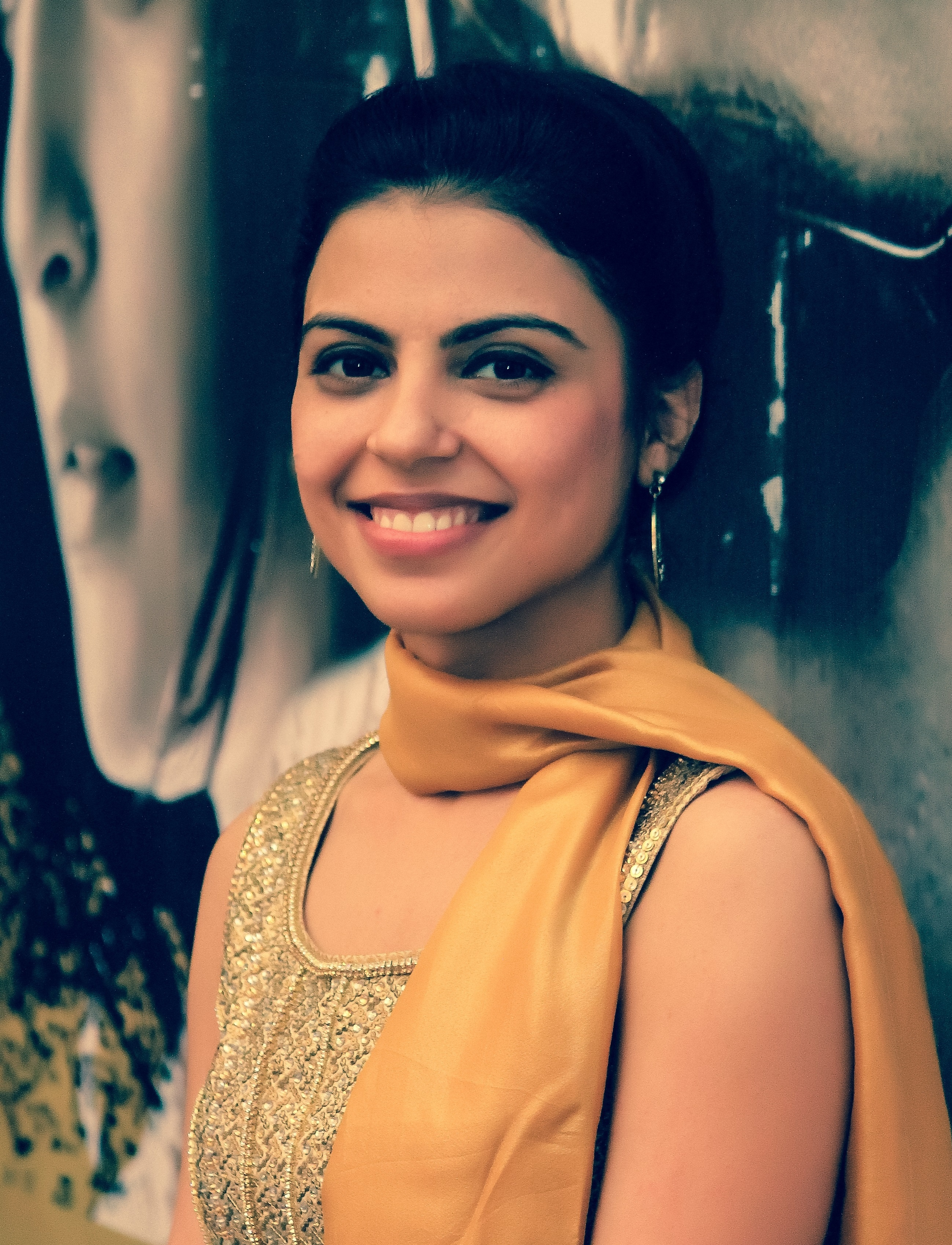
Jaspreet Kaur

Jaspreet Kaur is an Indian film producer. She produced Bengali film C/O Sir in 2013. She is the founder and CEO of KR Movies and Entertainment. She had produced other Bengali Films, including Bawal in 2015 and Cholai in 2016. She is producing a documentary on Irom Chanu Sharmila titled The Turning Point. Her next venture will be a book adaption of Vanara: The Legend of Baali, Sugreeva and Tara, Author Anand Neelakantan.

== Career ==
Jaspreet founded the film production company, KR Movies. Their first theatrical release (C/O Sir) in 2013 made Jaspreet was the youngest female producer in Eastern India.

KR Movies' film, Cholai, premiered at Cannes Film Festival 2016 and was nominated in six categories (winning Best Supporting Actress) in Madrid Film Festival 2016 including Best Film, Best Supporting Actress and Best Director.

She is co-creator of one-of-a-kind interactive TV series based on Motion Capture and 3D animation.

== Filmography ==
=== Producer ===
Year	Film	Producer
2013	C/O Sir	Yes
2015	Bawal	Yes
2016	Cholai	Yes
2017	The Turning Point (Documentary)	Yes
2019	Chegu	Yes
2019	Bala	Yes
2019	Yaman	Yes
2023	Sahela	Yes

== Recognition ==
Cholai was awarded two Filmfare awards in Jio Filmfare Awards (East) 2017. It won for Best Dialogue (Subhomay Chatterjee) and Critics' Best Film (Arun Roy).
