= Mental (2016 film) =

- Mental film poster
- Directed by: Shamim Ahamed Roni
- Screenplay by: Abdullah Zahir; Daud Hussein
- Produced by: Saiful Alam Chowdhury (Parvez)
- Starring: Shakib Khan; Nusrat Imrose Tisha; Achol
- Cinematography: Chandan Roy Chowdhury
- Music by: Dabbu; Akassh
- Production company: Banglaxpress Studio's
- Distributed by: Banglaxpress Film's
- Release date: July 7, 2016
- Country: Bangladesh
- Language: Bengali

Mental known as Mental: It can be your Love Story or Rana Pagla: The Mental, is a 2016 Bangladeshi psychological-action thriller film featuring Shakib Khan, Nusrat Imrose Tisha with Achol, Misha Sawdagor, Shiba Shanu, Don and Shimul Khan in supporting roles. The film was directed by debutant Shamim Ahamed Roni with the screenplay written by Abdullah Zahir and Daud Hussein. The film was produced by Saiful Alam Chowdhury (Parvez) under the banner of Banglaxpress Films.

The first theatrical look of the film was revealed on 1 February 2015. The core plot of the movie was partially based on the 2013 Kannada movie Bachchan with coffee shop comedy sequences borrowed from the 2013 Telugu movie Balupu. The film was released on Eid al-Fitr, on 7 July 2016.

== Plot ==
An underworld mafia steals valuable mineral resources and sells them to an international crime organization. Simi (Nusrat Imrose Tisha), a news reporter, exposes the whole criminal chain to the media, despite all threats from them. An unknown, mysterious but affectionate and intimidating man comes up to help. The story revolves around revealing his true identity and his link to the underworld.

Khan portrays the role of a generous businessman. Simi, portrayed by Tisha, is his love interest, and a crime news reporter, who is working on exposing corruptions of influential people. Simi takes steps to fight the corrupt people, but soon realizes the influence of those men. Khan changes after a violent encounter in which his love interest, Simi is killed. The plot builds up around his quest to avenge the killing with aid of her research, in which she documents her encounter with her killers, whose corruption she planned to expose.

== Cast ==
- Shakib Khan as Shahriar Tanvir Rana alias Rana Pagla
- Nusrat Imrose Tisha as Simi, an news reporter
- Achol as Achol/Mehruba Siddiqui
- Misha Sawdagor
- Siraj Haider
- Amir Siraji
- Don
- Shiba Shanu
- Pervez Chowdhury
- Sanko Panja
- DJ Shohel
- Shimul Khan
- Kamal Patekar
- Jadu Azad
- Afzal Sharif
- Subrata
- Rebeka Rouf
- Kabila
- Ratan Khan
- Roman
- Shiuly
- Foysal
- Pritha
- Mahi
- SA Haque Alik
- Amir Fakir
- Pavel
- Rifat
- Debashish Biswas as Special Appearance
- Moushumi Hamid as Special Appearance in the song Khaina Jonab
- Sabrina Porshi as Special Appearance in the song Mon Najehal

== Production ==
By early 2014, Bangladesh Express Films announced its production and were preparing for the shooting for the film. The Abhi Pictures picked up the distribution rights of the film. The shooting officially started in Sylhet, Bangladesh in September 2014.

=== Casting ===
Shakib Khan was the first to be roped for the film by director Shamim Ahamed Roni. However, the director has considered many actresses for the lead role but later finalized Tisha, Achol and Porshi for lead female roles. The studio approached Porshi for the film to play the role of a musician while Tisha and Achol were roped to play news reporters.

=== Filming ===
The official filming of Mental began in November 2014 in Dhaka. Scenes were filmed in Dhaka, and Sylhet while several scenes were filmed abroad.

== Soundtracks ==
Mental (Original Motion Picture Soundtrack)

Soundtrack album by Satrujit Dasgupta, Akassh, Rishi Chanda, Jojo, Antara Mitra, Sabrina Porshi, Shaan
- Released: 2015
- Genre: Feature film soundtrack
- Label: Banglaxpress Film's / HTM Records (Digital Partner)

The soundtrack of the film was written by Prosen, Riddhi, Shomeshwar Oli, Zahid Hasan Abhi, Zahid Akbar and Rabiul Islam Jibon while the music was directed by Dabbu Ghoshal and Akassh. In November 2014, Shaan recorded the second track. In December 2014, Jojo recorded the third track item number of the movie. The track "Bolte Baki Koto Ki" was released as a single on 23 January 2015.

No.	Title	Writer(s)	Singer(s)	Length
1.	"Mental Bole Re Amay (Title Track)"	Prosen	Satrujit Dasgupta	3:25
2.	"Amar Moto Ke Ache Bolo"	Zahid Akbar, Rabiul Islam Jibon	Akassh	4:50
3.	"Premta Toder Nesha"	Riddhi	Rishi Chanda, Antara Mitra	3:00
4.	"Mon Najehal"	Prosen	Shaan, Porshi	5:04
5.	"Ureche Dhulo"	Prosen	Mohammad Irfan	5:03
6.	"Khaina Jonab (Item Song)"	Shomeshwar Oli	Jojo	3:38

== Controversy ==
The film faced a lot of controversies after the release of the first track "Bolte Baki Koto Ki" due to alleged copyright infringement. The same tune with slightly different lyrics entitled "Bolte Bolte Cholte Cholte" was released on 20 January 2015 by Imran Mahmudul, three days before the release of Mental's first track. Although the song composition is very similar, both Prosen and Shafiq Tuhin were credited for the same song. Later it was confirmed that Imran Mahmudul is the legal copyright holder of the song and he was originally commissioned for the song by the producers, but later dropped out due to professional indifference.
