= Chittagainga Powa Noakhailla Maiya =

Bangladeshi romantic comedy film

- Poster
- Bengali: চিটাগাংইয়া পোয়া নোয়াখাইল্লা মাইয়া
- Directed by: Uttam Akash
- Produced by: Selim Khan
- Starring: Shakib Khan; Shabnom Bubly; Moushumi; Omar Sunny; Kazi Hayat; Sadek Bachchu
- Music by: Akassh; Sahriar Rafat
- Production company: Shapla Media
- Release date: 16 June 2018
- Country: Bangladesh
- Language: Bengali

Chittagainga Powa Noakhailla Maiya (Bengali: চিটাগাংইয়া পোয়া নোয়াখাইল্লা মাইয়া) is a Bangladeshi romantic comedy film directed by Uttam Akash. The film was produced by Selim Khan and the production house was Shapla Media. The film stars Shakib Khan, and Shabnom Bubly in the lead roles, along with Moushumi, Omar Sunny, Kazi Hayat, Sadek Bachchu in supporting roles.

== Cast ==
- Shakib Khan as Anzam
- Shabnom Bubly as Riya
- Moushumi
- Omar Sani
- DJ Shohel
- Rebeka Rouf
- Kazi Hayat
- Sadek Bachchu

== Production ==
Filming began on 6 October 2017, at the Bangladesh Film Development Corporation. The following month, filming took place in Mymensingh and the title song was shot in Thailand.

== Soundtrack ==
No.	Title	Lyrics	Music	Singer(s)	Length
1.	"Chittagainga Powa Noakhailla Maiya"	Sudip Kumar Dip	Rafat	Rafat & Oishi	4:55
2.	"Golapi Golapi"	Priyo Chattopadhyay	Akassh	Akassh & Tanuza	3:02
3.	"Keno Aajkal"	Robiul Islam Jibon	Akassh	Akassh	4:23
4.	"Super Heroine"	Sudip Kumar Dip	Sahriar Rafat	Akassh	4:23
Total length:					15:36

== Awards ==
Awards	Date	Category	Nomination	Results
Indo-Bangla Film Awards	21 October 2019	Best Female Playback Singer	Fatima Tuz Zahra Oyshee (Song: "Chittagainga Powa Noakhailla Maiya")	Won
