= Shree Pritam =

Indian music director

Shree Pritam শ্রী প্রীতম
- Also known as: Pritam Da, Shree Pritam
- Born: Kolkata, India
- Genres: Bengali Film Base
- Occupations: Composer, singer
- Years active: 2012–present

Shree Pritam (Bengali: শ্রী প্রীতম, Hindi: श्री प्रीतम) is an Indian music director and singer who has performed music with Bappi Lahiri. Pritam composed songs for Indo-Bangladeshi, Bangladeshi and Indian Bengali films. In 2018 he composed for Ami Neta Hobo, a Bangladeshi film.

== Discography ==
- Bikram Singha: The Lion Is Back (2012)
- Idiot (2012)
- Khoka 420 (2013)
- Khiladi (2013)
- Ami Neta Hobo (2018)
- Tui Amar Rani (2019)
