= Lutfor Hasan =

- লুৎফর হাসান
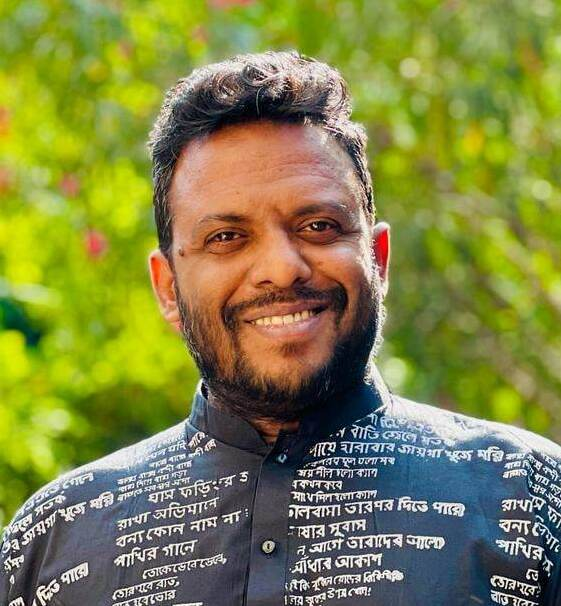
- Born: February 16, 1979 (age 47); Gopalpur Upazila, Tangail District, Bangladesh
- Occupations: Singer, songwriter, author, lyricist
- Known for: Singer, songwriter, author
- Notable work: Ghuri Tumi Kar Akashe Uro

Lutfor Hasan (born 16 February 1979) is a Bangladeshi singer-songwriter, musician and author. He has released a total of seven full-length solo studio-albums till now. His first solo album named Ghuri Tumi Kar Akashe Uro was released in 2011. In his music career, he has sung more than 600 songs. He is also known for his collaborations with other singers.

== Early life and education ==
He was born on 16 February 1979 in Gopalpur, Tangail. His father Abdur Rashid and his mother Latifa Begum. He has two brothers. He earned both his Bachelor's and Master's degrees from Rajshahi University.

== Career ==
=== Musical career ===
Hasan has worked in the production of more than 600 songs. The most famous of his songs is Ghuri Tumi Kar Akashe Uro (lit. 'Kite in whose sky do you fly'). His first solo album was released in 2011 under this title. Lyricist of this album Shomeshwar Oli. Some of his other popular singles include Amar Akaash Purotai, Bondhu Tomar Chuti Mele Na, Jodi Kanna Kanna Lage, Ayna Diye Ghor Bedhechi, and Khorochpatir Gaan. He has released seven studio albums, and more than 50 mixed albums to date. Hasan started writing song lyrics in 2003 and has worked with artists such as Azam Khan, Sanjeeb Choudhury, Bappa Mazumder, Subir Nandi, Kumar Bishwajit, Samina Chowdhury, Fahmida Nabi, Shakila Zafar, Pushpita, among others.

In May 2021 Lutfor Hasan, Nishita Barua and Shahriar Alam Marcell launched a project, aiming to release an album with 100 original songs. The collaboration seeks to promote original music and provide a platform for promising artists in Bangladesh's music industry. The first song Single Single Lage Naa, featured Lutfor Rahman and Nishita Barua and was released with a music video.

=== Writing career ===
Lutfor Hasan's first book was published in 2008. He has published more than 27 books. His writing includes stories, novels, poems and rhymes. Some of his notable books are Fekuya, Helenchaboti, Agun Bhora Kolosh, Jhinai Pakhi, Laal Kataner Dhukkho, Moneybag, Bogi Number Jha, Je Bochor Tumi Ami Chaade Giyechilam. He published his latest novel titled "Moratai" in February 2023. It's about the relationship between a father and daughter.

== Notable works ==
=== Albums ===
- Amar Akash Purotai
- Biroho udyan
- Jonakira
- Bondhu tomar chuti mele na
- Ghuri Tumi Kar Akashe Uro

=== Books ===
- Helenchaboti
- Fekua
- Shogourobe Choliteche
- Daakbaksher dana
- Thikana ratripur
- Agunbhora Kolosh
- Aynavanga Rod
- Bogi Number Jha
