= Amar Praner Priya =

- Official Poster
- Directed by: Jakir Hossain Raju
- Written by: Jakir Hossain Raju
- Produced by: Taposhi Faruk
- Starring: Shakib Khan; Bidya Sinha Mim; Misha Sawdagor; Prabir Mitra; Rehana Jolly; Khaleda Aktar Kolpona
- Music by: Hridoy Khan; Ali Akram Shuvo
- Production company: BFDC
- Release date: 20 September 2009
- Running time: 160 minutes
- Country: Bangladesh
- Language: Bengali

Amar Praner Priya (Bengali: আমার প্রাণের প্রিয়া) is a 2009 Dhallywood Bengali romantic comedy film directed by Jakir Hossain Raju. The film was released on 20 September 2009, on Eid-ul-Fitr and went on to become a box-office success in Bangladesh, primarily noted for its soundtrack & choreography. The film stars Shakib Khan, Mim and Misha Sawdagor, Prabir Mitra, Rehana Jolly, Khaleda Akter Kolpona and many more.

== Plot ==
Prem (Shakib Khan) always helps a lot of people, specially cases with love trouble. That's why people named him "LOVE GURU". But he does not love any girl, then he accidentally meets Priyanka (Mim) and falls in love with her. Initially, Priyanka does not reciprocate Prem's feelings because he is a son of a very rich businessman. Priyanka does not like rich people. But when Prem proves in many ways that his love for her is pure and very real, Priyanka could not refuse him. When they slowly start dating, Priyanka's brother, (Misha Sawdagor) becomes an obstacle between them. Priyanka's brother considers Prem as an enemy since his mother was killed by Prem in a road accident. It was just an accident, but her brother convinces Priyanka that it was all intentional. Priyanka misunderstands Prem and tries to take revenge. But one day Priyanka realizes her mistake in accusing Prem, for he is innocent and her brother is the main culprit who is coming between their relationship. She calls Prem and clears their misunderstanding. Heroically, Prem comes and takes his bride away from her evil and conspicuous brother.

== Cast ==
- Shakib Khan as Prem
- Bidya Sinha Mim as Priyanka
- Misha Sawdagor as Priyanka's brother
- Khaleda Aktar Kolpona as Priyanka's mother
- Prabir Mitra as Prem's father
- Rehana Jolly as Prem's mother
- Kabila
- Nasrin
- Chikon Ali
- Md Jakir Hossain (Actor) as police

== Soundtrack ==
Amar Praner Priya

Soundtrack album by Hridoy Khan Ali Akram Shuvo
- Released: 2009
- Genre: Feature film soundtrack
- Producer: Taposhi Thakur

The soundtrack of Amar Praner Priya was composed by Hridoy Khan, Tishma and Ali Akram Shuvo.

=== Track listing ===
No.	Title	Artist(s)	Length
1.	"Amar Ekla Jibon"	Hridoy Khan	4:25
2.	"Chaina Meye"	Hridoy Khan	4:41
3.	"Ki Jadu Korecho Bolona"	Andrew Kishore & Kanak Chapa	5:20
4.	"I Love U"	S. I. Tutul	4:58
5.	"Amar Praner Priya"	Andrew Kishore & Baby Naznin	4:51
6.	"Chander Meye Josna Ami Beder Meye Na"	Tishma	5:14

== Accolades ==
=== Meril Prothom Alo Award 2009 ===
- Nominated: Best Actor is Shakib Khan
- Nominated: Best Actress is Mim Bidya Sinha Saha
- Nominated: Best Singer is Hridoy Khan for Chaina Meye Tumi

=== Uro-CJFB Performance Award 2009 ===
- Won: Best Movie – Amar Praner Priya
- Won: Best Actor – Shakib Khan

=== Film Award Bangla (FAB 2010) ===
Also known as "Epar Bangla and Opar Bangla" film award

- Won: Best Actress – Mim Bidya Sinha Saha
- Nominated: Best Actor – Shakib Khan

=== National Film Award 2009 ===
- Won Best Choreographer – Tanjil Alam
