= Zahid Akbar =

Bangladeshi lyricist

Zahid Akbar জাহিদ একবার
- Occupations: Lyricist
- Years active: 2000-present

Zahid Akbar (Bengali: জাহিদ আকবর) is a Bangladeshi lyricist. He has written for several albums and films. He has written songs for albums like "Nilanjona" (2011), "Bhalobashi Tomay" (2011), "Mon Mane Na" (2013), "Shotti Kore Bol" (2016), "Dehobazi" (2017) etc. (all has music composed by Arfin Rumey and films like Dub Satar (2011), Projapoti, Taarkata (2013) and Most Welcome 2 (2014).

== Career ==
Zahid started his career in 2000, when poet Kawser Ahmed Chowdhury inspired him for writing lyrics. 2011 was a great time in his career when he crooned albums like "Nilanjona", "Bhalobashi Tomay" and film Dub Satar, starring Nusrat Imroz Tisha. In 2013, he wrote lyrics for Taarkata, and Bollywood singers such as Palak Muchhal and Sunidhi Chauhan lent voice for his songs. In 2015, he wrote a song, "Ek Chokhe Sur Tomar" for veteran singer Sabina Yasmin, composed by Maksud Jamil Mintu. Her daughter Badhon sang another version with same lyrics. The same year, he wrote lyrics for Habib Wahid song "Keu Boney Araley" for the telefilm 'Meghe Dhaka Shohor'. He named “Dub Shatar”, “Dui Dike Boshobash” by Nazmun Munira Nancy, “Priyotoma” by Arfin Rumey, “Shunno” by Bappa Mazumder, “Aradhona” and “Veja Veja Haoa” from the film Most Welcome 2 among his best songs. In 2023, he penned a for the highest grossing Bangladeshi film of all time Priyotoma named "Govire" with a Sajid Sarker composition and sung by Rehana Rasool and Priyanka Gope, starring Shakib Khan and Idhika Paul.

== Awards ==
- CGPA Award for Best Lyricist - 2013
- Bichitra Award - 2015
