= Priyontee Urbee =

Bangladeshi actress and model

Priyanti Urbi
- Education: University of Dhaka
- Occupations: Actress, model
- Years active: 2019–present
- Spouse: Salman Ahmed (m. 2024)

Priyanti Urbi is a Bangladeshi actress and model. She has appeared in television dramas, OTT productions, and films. She began working in advertising in 2019 and took part in the Miss World Bangladesh pageant. She began acting in 2021 with the drama Bheja Biral.

== Early life and education ==
Priyanti Urbi grew up in the Jatrabari area of Dhaka. She was interested in acting from childhood. When she was in second grade, she used to write “Priyanti Aishwarya Rai Urbi” in her notebook, combining her name with that of actress Aishwarya Rai Bachchan.

She studied in the Department of International Relations at the University of Dhaka and graduated from the department. She ranked 21st in the university's combined admission merit list. On 29 December 2024, she married Salman Ahmed.

== Career ==
Urbi participated in the Miss World Bangladesh pageant in 2019. She began her career as an advertising model in late 2020. In March 2021, she made her acting debut in Aniruddha Russell's drama Bheja Biral. In 2022, she made her OTT debut in Kothay Palabe Bolo Rupban, a segment of the Chorki anthology film Ei Muhurte. She later appeared in web films such as Cafe Desire and Opolap. In Opolap, she played a negative character.

=== Filmography ===
| Title | Year | Type | Role |
|---|---|---|---|
| Cafe Desire | 2022 | Web film | |
| Lohar Tori | 2022 | Film | |
| Opolap | 2023 | Web film | |
| Book Pocket-er Golpo | 2024 | Film | |
| Emon Dine Tare Bola Jay | 2025 | Film | |
| Naseeb | 2025 | Film | |
| Bonolota Sen | 2026 | Film | |

== Upcoming projects ==
Her upcoming film Bakuler Buke Raktokorobi is awaiting release.
