= Himel Ashraf =

Bangladeshi film director, producer and screenwriter

- Born: February 4, 1987 (age 39); Dhaka
- Education: New York Film Academy
- Occupations: Director, producer, screenwriter
- Years active: 2010–present
- Known for: Priyotoma (2023)

Himel Ashraf is a Bangladeshi director, screenwriter and producer. Best known for his film Priyotoma (2023), which became the highest grossing Bangladeshi film of all time.

== Early life and education ==
Himel Ashraf resides in Manhattan, US. He studied digital film direction at the New York Film Academy.

== Career ==
Ashraf began his directorial journey as an assistant director in collaboration with Mostofa Sarwar Farooki. In 2010, he began directing full-length Natok (dramas). Among his popular serials are Window, Chowdhury Villa and Goppo. He started his journey as a director with the film Sultana Bibiana in 2017, which received positive response from the audiences. Film critics and lyricist Zahid Akbar of The Daily Star praised his direction. In another review in The Daily Star Amaira Amin criticized his direction, noted that, "The director Himel Ashraf is known for making TV series and the movie definitely felt like a series. However, it is also possible to get the impression that the director has made a full-fledged commercial film." After a gap of 6 years, his second directorial venture Priyotoma was released in 2023 with Shakib Khan and Idhika Paul, which grossed total ৳412.3 million worldwide, became one of the highest grossing Bangladeshi film of all time. Film critic Rahman Moti mentioned in Bangla Movie Database that director Himel Ashraf presented the film Priyotoma in a mixed presentation. His third directorial is Arshad Adnan's Rajkumar (2024), second collaboration with Khan, which met with mixed to positive reviews and became one of the highest grossing Bangladeshi films and the second highest grossing Bangladeshi films of 2024.

== Personal life ==
His wife’s name is Fariha Jannat. On 18 April 2025, the couple had a son named Adhan Ashraf.

== Television ==
1. Bariwala
2. Misfire
3. Jonakir Alo
4. Lal Nil Holud Bati

== Filmography ==
Key
†	Denotes films that have not yet been released

Year	Film	Director	Screenplay	Story	Note	Ref.
2017	Sultana Bibiana	Yes	No	No	Debut film	
2023	Priyotoma	Yes	Yes	No	Won – BFDA Awards for Best Film Director	
2024	Rajkumar	Yes	Yes	Yes		
2027	Mohabbat †	Yes	No	No	Filming	
