= Imran Ahmed =

Imran Ahmed or Ahmad may refer to:

- Imran Ahmed (cricketer), (born 1981) Bangladeshi cricketer
- Imran Ahmed (strategist), (born 1978) British political activist
- Imran Ahmad, Bangladeshi politician
- Imran Ahmad (admiral), Pakistan Navy admiral
