= Tishma =

Background information
- Genres: Rock music, hip-hop, R&B, classical, pop, experimental
- Occupations: Singer, songwriter, rapper, pianist, guitarist, musician, music composer, music producer
- Instruments: Vocals, piano, guitar, drums
- Years active: 2003 – present
- Website: tishmaonline.com

Tishma is a pop rock singer, songwriter, rapper, pianist, guitarist, musician, music composer and music producer in the U.S.A Bangladesh. She is also known as the "Rock Princess of Bangladesh" by fans. She plays a variety of musical instruments such as piano, guitar, keyboard, and drums, and is Bangladesh's first female music composer and music producer. She is an innovator in Bangladeshi popular music and is noted for introducing changes in the pop music arena in her country.

== Career ==
As of 2024, Tishma has released nineteen solo albums. Tishma made her debut as a child artist with her album Tara in late December 2002. From then on, Tishma has worked with other music genres, such as R&B, ballads, and funk.

In 2011, Tishma's first own composed album Xperiment came out, which was the first album composed by a Bangladeshi female artist. The next year, she released Xperiment ReloadeD, and in 2013, she released Hypnotized which were also composed by herself. In 2014, Tishma released her next solo album, Rockstar. A documentary video album of Tishma named The Rock Princess – Xposed, was released in 2013 or 2014. In 2015, she released MesmerizeD, which contained English tracks and is the first original English album released by a Bangladeshi artist. In 2016, Tishma's thirteenth solo album, Royalty, was released. From this album, "Mone Mone Tomake Bhalobashi Mone Hoe" was released as a single in the same year.

Following 'Royalty' in 2016, Tishma next released two more of her own written and composed solo albums titled 'X' (2018) and '2020' (2020) respectively. It is currently not yet known when her upcoming new album will be released.

== Education and biography ==
Tishma spent a large part of her early childhood in various parts of Europe, beginning her formal education in the UK.

Originally a classically trained musician, Tishma began her musical education at a very early age; she was playing piano by age four, and studied European classical music and music theory under ABRSM. She also received talim (musical education) in Indian classical music and later studied Tagore songs and folk music. She has released songs in a variety of genres such as rock, Bangla folk, opera, rap, classical, experimental, alternative, Nazrul, Rabindra Sangeet and Adhunik.

Alongside having released most of her albums while in school, Tishma has 10 A's in O levels (in one sitting) and 5 A's in A levels. In 2014, she took a break from music production to attend college to study engineering.

== Discography ==
=== Albums ===
- Tara (2002) (due to the release time late in the year, sometimes Tishma's album is often listed as a 2003 release)
- Chand (2003)
- Shurjo (2004)
- Baula Prem (2005)
- Sham Rakhi Na Kul Rakhi (2006)
- Matir Putul (2006)
- Cholonar Daba (2007)
- X-Factor (2008)
- Xperiment (2011)
- XoXo (Xperiment ReLoadeD) (2012)
- Hypnotized (2013)
- Rockstar (2014)
- Mesmerized (2015)
- Royalty (2016)
- X (2018)
- 2020 (2020)
- Xperiment X (2021)
- XX (2022)
- Cobra (2023)

=== Video albums ===
- 2003 – Pop Queen
- 2003 – Bashiwallah
- 2003 – Chand
- 2004 – Digi Digi Dum Dum
- 2004 – Best of Tishma
- 2005 – Sham Rakhi Na Kul Rakhi
- 2005 – Deewana
- 2005 – Prem
- 2006 – Matir Putul
- 2006 – Neel Chokh
- 2007 – Chander Meye Josna
- 2008 – Mega Hitz of Tishma
- 2009 – Rock Rajkonna
- 2010 – Projapoti
- 2014 – The Rock Princess – Xposed (musical documentary)
