= KR Movies and Entertainment =

- Company type: Private
- Industry: Entertainment
- Genre: Entertainment
- Founded: 2013
- Founder: Jaspreet Kaur
- Headquarters: Kolkata, West Bengal, India
- Area served: India
- Key people: Jaspreet Kaur
- Products: Motion pictures
- Website: www.krmoviez.com

KR Movies and Entertainment is a film production house from Kolkata, India. Their latest film production project was the Bengali film named Bawal released on 12 June 2015. Their first production was the Bengali film C/O Sir in 2013 directed by Kaushik Ganguly.

== Films ==
Year	Film	Actors	Director
2016	Cholai (film)	Saswata Chatterjee	Arun Roy
2015	Bawal (film)	Arjun Chakrabarty, Ritabhari Chakraborty	Biswaroop Biswas
2013	C/O Sir	Saswata Chatterjee, Raima Sen	Kaushik Ganguly
