= Priyotoma =

Bangladeshi film (2023)

- Theatrical release poster
- প্রিয়তমা
- Directed by: Himel Ashraf
- Screenplay by: Himel Ashraf; Faruk Hossain
- Story by: Faruk Hossain
- Produced by: Arshad Adnan
- Starring: Shakib Khan; Idhika Paul; Shahiduzzaman Selim; Lutfur Rahman George; Kazi Hayat
- Cinematography: Saiful Shaheen
- Edited by: Simit Ray Antor
- Music by: Akassh; Prince Mahmud; Sajid Sarker
- Production company: Versatile Media
- Distributed by: Tiger Media; Swapna Scarecrow
- Release date: 29 June 2023 (Bangladesh)
- Running time: 140 minutes; 142 minutes (Note: IFCO and BBFC censor clarification)
- Country: Bangladesh
- Language: Bengali
- Budget: est.৳2.5 crore (US$200,000)
- Box office: ৳44 crore (US$3.6 million)

Priyotoma (Note: Bengali: প্রিয়তমা; Bengali pronunciation: [priʲot̪ɔma]; transl. Sweetheart) is a 2023 Bangladeshi romantic drama-tragedy film. The film was directed by Himel Ashraf, and is the second he has directed. It was produced by Arshad Adnan under the banner of Versatile Media. The film story was written by late Faruk Hossain alone and Himel Ashraf jointly wrote the screenplay and dialogues with him. It is a tragic love story that left an indelible mark on Sumon's (played by Shakib Khan) life, shattering his world and left him forever transformed, featuring Idhika Paul, Shahiduzzaman Selim and Lutfur Rahman George in the lead role. Many others including Elina Shammi, Don and Shiba Shanu performed important roles.

In 2017, Shakib Khan announced the film under his production. Six years after this announcement the principal photography of the film officially began on 8 May 2023, under Arshad Adnan's production. It was wrapped up on 21 June 2023. The film's first look was revealed on 2 June 2023, although no trailer was released. It got censor clarification on 22 June 2022. The film was shot mostly in Dhaka, Sylhet and Sunamganj with sporadic schedules in Cox's Bazar and Bandarban. The music was composed by Akassh, Prince Mahmud and Sajid Sarker, cinematography handled by Saiful Shaheen, choreographed by Baba Yadav and editing was by Simit Ray Antor.

Priyotoma received positive reviews from critics with high praise for the soundtrack and climax. It set several box office records for a Bangladeshi film and went on to become the highest grossing Bangladeshi film of all time, overtaking Beder Meye Joshna (1989) after 34 years. It is also the highest grossing Bangladeshi film of 2023.

The film won several accolades including nine awards (including Best Actor and Best Actress in the Special Honors category) at the 22nd Babisas Awards.

== Synopsis ==
Devastated by his brother's death, Sumon (Shakib Khan) embarks on a journey to a distant city to retrieve funds from his brother's business partner. Little did he know that this endeavor would lead him down an unexpected path of love. In a twist of fate, Sumon found himself in the arms of a politician's daughter, an encounter that would forever change the course of his existence. This tragic love story left an indelible mark on Sumon's life, shattering his world and leaving him forever changed.

== Plot ==
Sumon (Shakib Khan) is a happy-go-lucky village boy from Dhaka. His elder brother, Sujon, runs a business in Cox's Bazar with Usman. One day, Sujon is killed — murdered by Usman over a money dispute. The incident destroys Sumon's family. After Sujon's death, his wife (Sumon's sister-in-law) tries to get her share of the money from Usman, but Usman's gang attacks her.

Devastated by his brother's death, Sumon travels to Cox's Bazar to collect the money from Usman. There, Khalek, the former Upazila Chairman and Iti's father, witnesses the fight and intervenes to settle the dispute. As a gesture of support, he invites Sumon to stay at his house.

At Khalek's house, Sumon meets Iti, also known as Priyotoma (Idhika Paul), the Chairman's spirited and bubbly daughter. She is naive and childish but very sweet. At first they fight, but slowly they fall in love.

The main problems begin because Iti is the daughter of a powerful politician, while Sumon is a nobody. There is a clear class difference, and to make things worse, Usman is still after Sumon. Iti's father, Khalek, does not accept their love.

Sumon gets pulled into politics while seeking justice for his brother, involving court cases and fights with Usman and Ranga.

Just when Sumon thinks he is about to win — getting justice for his brother and marrying Iti — tragedy strikes. Iti is diagnosed with a brain tumour and dies. Her sudden demise leaves an indelible mark on Sumon's life, shattering his world and leaving him forever transformed.

Twenty years later, an old Sumon is still living alone in that same house in Cox's Bazar, holding on to Iti's memories. He never marries anyone else and talks to her photo. The whole film is his flashback about how one love changed his entire life forever.

== Cast ==
- Shakib Khan as Sumon
- Idhika Paul as Iti
- Shahiduzzaman Selim as Usman
- Lutfur Rahman George as Khalek a.k.a. Khalek Chairman, a former Chairman of Cox's Bazar Upazila Parishad and Iti's father.
- Kazi Hayat as Sumon's father
- Shiba Shanu as Sujon, a lessee of the Eid al-Adha's Qurbani hut and Sumon's elder brother. One of Usman's business partners. Later, he was killed by Usman.
- Don as Ranga, Usman right-hand
- Elina Shammi as Sujon's wife
- Lutfur Rahman Khan Shimanto as John
- Shahid-Un-Nabi as Khobir, Iti's elder brother
- Imtu Ratish
- Kochi Khandokar
- Kazi Uzzal
- Pran Roy
- Jahid Islam as Masud, Usman's gang

== Production ==
=== Development ===
"Priyotoma can be an example of how we are not lagging behind in making movies despite many obstacles. Now just waiting for the proof. I tried to give my best. The audience will tell the rest."

— Himel Ashraf on making Priyotoma.

In 2014, Shakib Khan produced his film Hero: The Superstar under his production company SK Films. Almost three years later, in November 2017, he announced the production of Priyotoma from his own production company, which was to be his second film at the time. Regarding his second production, he told Prothom Alo at that time, "It's been a long time since I produced my first film from SK Films. I was waiting for such a story for so long." Then on 6 November 2017, the name of this film was registered in the Bangladesh Film Directors Association. At that time, director Himel Ashraf told Prothom Alo that the filming would begin in late February or early March 2018.

The late Farooq Hossain wrote the story and screenplay of the film jointly with director Himel Ashraf, which is the last script he wrote. Earlier in 2015, Farooq Hossain went missing in the sea. It is the unfinished screenplay written by screenwriter Farooq Hossain. Subsequently, the film's director Himel Ashraf gave it a full form. Himel Ashraf told Prothom Alo, "I have made the screenplay my own way, making two unfinished screenplays of Farooq (Hossain) in one place." Khan's personal makeup artist Sabuj Khan and costume designer Farah Diba worked as a make-up artist in the film, who has previously collaborated with the protagonist in Nabab LLB, Antaratma and Leader: Amie Bangladesh. According to reports from the production company, it is the most expensive film to be released on Eid al-Adha 2023. On 28 June 2023, Samakal reported that over ৳2.5 crore were spent on the film's production. Action director Rajesh Kannan worked as the film's stunt director, who had previously worked with the protagonist Khan in Shikari, Nabab and Chalbaaz.

On 25 April 2023, through a Facebook post, director Himel Ashraf announced the release date of the film on Eid al-Adha 2023 and named Arshad Adnan as the producer under Versatile Media. About film's pre-production work Himel Ashraf said in an interview with Channel i that, the pre-production work of the film began on 22 February 2023, and had more than 100 people working on its table work. He also said that the film would have stuntmen and choreographers from abroad and high-quality background music and all the post-production work of the film including post VFX would be done abroad.

=== Casting ===
Initially no actress was selected for this film, but in November 2017, in an interview with Prothom Alo's Manjur Quader, Shabnom Bubly claimed to act in the film herself as the lead actress. At that time, news about this was reported in the national media. However, on 5 May 2023, the name of Indian model-actress Idhika Paul was announced as the lead actress for the film. In response to the media's question as to why Shabnom Bubly was dropped from the film, Shakib Khan said that, "Bubly had to be dropped due to the needs of the character." Subsequently, in an exclusive conversation with Prothom Alo, he revealed the specific reason for not casting Bubly in the film, he said that, "Initially when Priyotoma was in under discussed, the story required someone completely new, who had done a few acts, but had absolutely no acting experience in films. Bubly has acted in more than a dozen films in the last few years. Apart from that, Bubly's age also is not covering with the story of the film. She was not taken into consideration at all."

=== Filming ===
The film's principal photography was begun on 8 May 2023. Two days later on 10 May, protagonist Shakib Khan participated in the filming of his part at Sadarghat in Old Dhaka. Himel Ashraf told Bangla Tribune, "In the first lot, we are filming in Dhaka. Then we'll go to Sunamganj. After filming there for several days, we'll go to Cox's Bazar. Filming will be completed by continuous shooting till 2 June.

The film was wrapped up on 21 June 2023.

== Marketing ==
Later on 10 May 2025, the first look of the film was revealed, where Shakib Khan was seen standing in the rain with long hair, slicked back, a sad look with a cigarette on his lips. Upon its release, it received critical acclaim from audiences and critics and went viral on social media. Later, the second look poster of the film was revealed on 28 May to mark protagonist Shakib Khan's 24 years in the film industry. Then on 17 June, a 30-second video first look teaser of the film was revealed. Upon its release, it received mixed reviews from audiences and critics. Later on 20 June, its third look was revealed, where Shakib Khan looks 80 years old. It received positive response from audiences and critics upon its release, his transformation as an old man considered is one of best look in his career. Khan's look cost an estimated ৳5 lakh to create. This look is used for six-seven minutes in the film. It takes about 15 days for a large makeup team skilled in prosthetic makeup to create it. Firstly, the measurements of Shakib Khan's face were taken. Then, a coating is formed in that way. The look is fixed by putting hair and beard there. Later the look is tested to check if it fits the character or not. Khan's personal make-up artist Sabuj Khan told Pratham Alo, "We were worried about this part throughout the shoot. Because prosthetic makeup is quite difficult. A long time is required. Have to sit continuously. Can't be wrong. All should be written separately. Makeup works should also be shared. It took us six to seven hours a day to apply this makeup during shooting. It also took three hours to remove this makeup. We have been with this makeup since three days ago." Each look and costume of the film sequence, entry, action and two songs were designed separately.

== Soundtrack ==
Priyotoma

Soundtrack album by Akassh, Prince Mahmud and Sajid Sarker
- Released: 2023
- Recorded: 2023
- Studio: Versatile Media
- Genre: Film soundtrack
- Length: 11:15
- Language: Bengali language
- Label: Tiger Media
- Producers: Akassh; Prince Mahmud; Sajid Sarker

Akassh chronology
Bir (2020)	Priyotoma (2023)	Rajkumar (2024)

Prince Mahmud chronology
Zero Degree (2015)	Priyotoma (2023)	Rajkumar (2024)

Sajid Sarker chronology
Networker Baire (2021)	Priyotoma (2023)	Rajkumar (2024)

Singles from Priyotoma
- 1. "Qurbani Qurbani" Released: 24 June 2023; 2. "O Priyotoma" Released: 27 June 2023; 3. "Eshwar" Released: 29 June 2023

The soundtrack of the film is composed by Akassh, Prince Mahmud and Sajid Sarker. The first song of the film is Qurbani Qurbani, composed and music arranged by Akassh. He also sang the song, apart from composed the lyrics. The song was shot for three days at Bangladesh Film Development Corporation (BFDC) in Dhaka and Panam City in Narayanganj. It was released on 24 June 2023, on Shakib Khan's official Facebook page and his own production company SK Films' YouTube channel. Within three hours of its release, the song received over 154k reactions on Facebook and over 1 million views. It was followed by the release of its second single "O Priyotoma", which is a romantic number, where Khan and Paul are seen for the first time, on 27 June. The song is sung by Balam along with Somnur Monir Konal, which lyrics penned by Asif Iqbal is composed by Akassh. According to Channel i reports, singer Balam made his comeback in playback after almost ten years with the film. It features another song titled Eshwar composed by Prince Mahmud, who had previously composed music for Mostofa Sarwar Farooki's Third Person Singular Number (2009) and Animesh Aich's Zero Degree (2015). However, he did not work regularly in film songs, this time he composed a song for the first time in a mainstream commercial film. After the release of the first song of the film, on 25 June, Prince Mahmud told Prothom Alo about the song, "The song is very good. Those who listened to our songs in the 90's will like it, and the audience of present generation will also like it." Lyrics written by Someshwar Oli, who collaborate with Mahmud for the first time, the song is sung by Aquib Zaman Riyad, which is his debut film. It was revealed on 29 June, the day Eid. The film's fourth song titled "Govire" was sung by Rehaan Rasul and Priyanka Gope, which composed by Sajid Sarker and lyrics penned by Zahid Akbar. It is the third collaboration between with lead actor and Akbar. He had previously written "Jekhanei Jaabe Amake Pabe" for the 2014 Shakib Khan-produced film Hero: The Superstar and another song titled "Surma Surma" for the 2023 film Leader: Amie Bangladesh. About the song he told Channel i that, "Govire" is a song that reaches deep into the heart, not a song of excitement. A song like love spreading through vein sub-vein. I was more motivated to write the song after seeing the dummy of Shakib Khan's 80-year-old look in the story. Listening to the song, the audience can tell how it is."

Rahman Moti praised the film's soundtrack. He also mentioned the BGM in particular. Rupam Acharya described all the songs in the film as "simply amazing". Tirthok Ahsan Rasel described the film's song as "superhit". However, he criticised the song's video as a "music video".

Track listing
No.	Title	Lyrics	Music	Singer(s)	Length
1.	"Qurbani Qurbani"	Akassh	Akassh	Akassh	3:26
2.	"O Priyotoma"	Asif Iqbal	Akassh	Balam and Somnur Monir Konal	3:46
3.	"Eshwar"	Shomeshwar Oli	Prince Mahmud	Riyad	4:03
4.	"Eshwar (Sad Version)" (Additional track)	Shomeshwar Oli	Prince Mahmud	Riyad	4:21
5.	"Govire"	Zahid Akbar	Sajid Sarker	Rehaan Rasul and Priyanka Gope	4:12
6.	"Tomar Porosh" (Additional track)	Arzeen Kamal	Arzeen Kamal	Arzeen Kamal	3:31
Total length:					23:19

== Release ==
On 21 June 2023 it was submitted to Bangladesh Film Censor Board for clearance. On the very next day it got censor clearance without any cut. Two weeks before the release of the film, theatre owners started booking at a high price. Raj Cinema Hall (Kuliarchar, Kishoreganj), Asha Cinema Hall (Melandaha, Jamalpur) and several other cinema halls booked this film at High Rental. Himel Ashraf told about this on Channel i that, "Such interest (to the film's) of cinema hall owners has surprised us all. We believe that Priyotoma will be played in the highest number of cinema halls on Eid al-Adha on the highest rentals. Priyotoma will fulfill the expectations from the hall owner to the audience. On 26 June, Himel Ashraf confirmed 100 theatres for the film's release on Channel i, however, the final list of theatres has not been revealed. He also confirmed that the film is planned to be released abroad after Eid.

Primarily, the film was planned to release on Eid 2018, although the pre-production of the film was delayed due to various reasons. Then on 25 April 2023, director Himel Ashraf announced the release date of the film on Eid al Adha 2023 through a Facebook post. On 29 June 2023, the film was released in 107 theatres. (Note: This is the number of theatres mentioned by Prothom Alo. However, Samakal and Channel i mentioned that the number is 105.) out of 169 theatres across the country. Versatile Media's Manager Manjur Rahman told Prothom Alo that "Four closed halls – Bhasani Auditorium in Sirajganj, Razia Cinema Hall in Faridpur, Rajnigandha and Mallika in Naogaon – are opening to screening the cinema." It received good response from the audience after its release, with almost every show being a housefull. About this, Himel Ashraf said on The Daily Star that more than 450 shows of Priyotoma are running all over the country every day.

On the second day of the film's release on 30 June 2023, director Himel Ashraf announced in a Facebook post that it will be released in the United States and Canada on 7 July 2023. He also said that after America, the film will be released in many countries including Middle East, Europe, Australia, Malaysia, India. It will be distributed in the United States and Canada by international distribution company Swapna Scarecrow. Sajib Saptak, director of the organisation, told The Daily Star that the film Antarjal was supposed to be released on the same date in the United States and Canada on the occasion of Eid. But as the film was not released in Bangladesh, it was not released in USA and Canada either. Priyotoma was released there instead of Antarjal.

The film was later released on 7 July in 42 theatres in North America, including 37 in the United States and 5 in Canada. After the North American release, director Himel Ashraf confirmed with Channel i that the film will be released worldwide, including in Australia, the Middle East. He said that soon 'Priyotoma' will be released in Australia, New Zealand, Middle East, Malaysia, Singapore, India, Sweden, Denmark, Portugal, Italy, Finland, London (UK), Ireland, France.

It was released on 2 August 2023, in three cities, including Paris, France, which distributed by Deshi Entertainments. It was released in Australia on 6 August, and will run in around twenty cities. It is also running on 12 screens in the United Kingdom and Ireland from 18 August 2023, under the distribution of Reverie Films Europe. It is also released in Malaysia on 31 August 2023, on the occasion of Malaysian Independence Day in 6 cinemas under the distribution of Happy Trip Travel & Tours, earlier the film received censor clearance from Film Censorship Board of Malaysia on 25 August 2023. The film was released in 50 theatres across three states in India on 3 November 2023, which was promoted and distributed by India's SSR Cinemas.

=== Screening ===
The film premiered on 5 August 2023, at HOYTS Bankstown, Sydney marking its Australian release. Initially it was supposed to be a show for the premiere. As all the tickets for the first show were sold out, another show premiered at the same time by the distributor Eagle Entertainment and Krazy Tickets. Also few special screening of the film was held in Venice, Italy, which was an unofficial screening under Zahid Hasan Abhi's distribution. A special screening of the film was held at Star Cineplex, Dhaka, which was attended by the President of Bangladesh Mohammed Shahabuddin and First Lady Rebecca Sultana and his family members. Also the entire team of the film including protagonist Shakib Khan, director Himel Ashraf and producer Arshad Adnan were present. On 14 February 2024, the film was screened at the 22nd Amar Vashar Cholochchitro (trans. Films in my Language) festival organised by the Dhaka University Film Society on the occasion of Valentine's Day.

=== Home media ===
The film became available as VOD on online streaming service Bioscope on 22 August 2023. The film crossed 1 crore minutes views in just 40 hours, and over 5 crore minutes views in the first 18 days, which is a milestone in the country's OTT history.

== Reception ==
=== Critical response ===
Film's critics Rahman Moti of Bangla Movie Database gave the film 7.5/10. He mentioned to Priyotoma as a mixed presentation. He appreciated the story presentation of the film. He wrote that, "after the film's name many people would naturally think it's a romance film, but the film has been made into a mixed category by bringing the atmosphere of thriller and tragedy." However, he noted that the film's comedy is very weak. Fahim Montasir describes Shakib Khan as a Priyotoma's strength, as well as a weakness. He praised Shakib Khan's look-getup, also praised Khan's change in acting style. But he criticised its technicalities. He rated the film 5 out of 10 star. Mithun Kumar Pal in Kaler Kantho praised the film's climax and he praised Shakib Khan's look and get up. He wrote, "The look of Shakib Khan I saw at the very end of the film is in one word perfect. However, he mentioned the average style of the first half of the film. Fiction writer and critics Ahsan Kabir in Bangla Tribune mentioned that the film's story is old and familiar, also the production is rushed. He also mentioned inconsistencies and slight slowness in the story. He gave the film 6.5 out of 10. Abdullah Al Mamun wrote in Prothom Alo that, Priyotoma is a money-grubbing film. He thinks that the Team Priyotoma has tried to do the best in cinematography, location, sound, costume, makeup and lighting. Film critic RnaR divided the film's screenplay into three parts, describing the first part (Act1) as average, the second part (Act2) as below average and the third part (Act3) as brilliant, outstanding. However, he described the technical aspects of the film Priyotoma as very poor, particularly its sound mixing, background score, dubbing and editing. But he praised the climax, look get-up and supporting characters. Filmmaker and author Sadat Hossain lamented the story, weak screenplay, situational treatment of the movie Priyotoma. He praised Shakib Khan's performance, writing that Khan has shown his full potential with ultimate skill. He also praised Idhika Paul, Shahiduzzaman Selim and Lutfur Rahman George's performance. Hossain Moulud Tejo of FilmyMike rated the film 3.5 out of 5. He wrote, the film is a successful cinematic experience with Shakib Khan's acting and Himel Ashraf's direction. Rupam Acharya praised Idhika Paul's expression and performance. He also praised the film's climax. Syed Nazmus Sakib in Star Movie Review on The Daily Star noted that the film's editing, cinematography and color grading are weak at many points. But he praised the last half an hour of the movie. Tirthok Ahsan Rasel wrote that, both the story-screenplay is very weak and the main theme is so common that I think 8/10 dramas based on the main theme have been done in the past few years. He mentioned that the movie's makeup, getup, look, location, costume are all good.

=== Box office ===
==== Domestic ====
Priyotoma had a successful opening week and the film continue to dominate the box office. Making it to be another commercial hit film for Shakib Khan in 2023. The film received massive response and is said to contribute to record breaking sales in some renowned theatres. The film grossed more than ৳10.30 crore (US$840,000) within 7 Days. The film got huge response from the audiences in its second week within 152 theatres worldwide and grossed ৳8.55 crore (US$700,000). It received a good response from 84 theatres worldwide in its third week as well. The film grossed ৳5.75 crore worldwide at the box office in its third week. The film also grossed ৳2.35 crore worldwide at the box office in its fourth week. After end of 4th week, the film grossed ৳26.95 crore worldwide at the box office and became the highest-grossing film in the history of Bangladeshi cinema surpassing the previous record holder Beder Meye Josna (1989). According to media's several reports, the film's total gross collection is ৳44 crore (US$3.6 million).

==== United States and Canada ====
The film also commercially success in the US and Canada box office with grossed collection US$44,000 in just three days, which is the fourth highest opening ever in the history of Bangladeshi films at the North American box office. The film grossed US$84,000 in its first week of North American release. It is now the second highest-grossing film in the history of Bangladeshi cinema after Hawa (2022), considering its first week earnings in North America. It grossed US$28,000 from 4 theatres in its second week in North America, which remains the fourth Bangladeshi film to cross the US$1 lakh mark in North America. It is grossed US$8,500 in its third week and US$5,500 in its fourth week as well, with total gross collection US$126,000 at the North American box office, which is the third highest-grossing Bangladeshi film at the North American box office, surpassing Debi (2018). It also set a joint record with Hawa for running in a single theatre for five consecutive weeks. It is the highest-grossing Bangladeshi film in a single theatre in North America with a four-week gross collection of US$67,104 at the Jamaica multiplex. After the successfully complete theatre run, North American distribution company Swapna Scarecrow reported that, Priyotoma is the highest grossing Bangladeshi film of 2023 in North America. The film has grossed collection US$132,235 (equivalent to $139,731 in 2025).

==== United Kingdom and Ireland ====
The film also performed well in the United Kingdom and Ireland box office. It grossed collection is £24,987 (US$34,228.77) in its first week in the United Kingdom box office, which is the second highest grossing in the United Kingdom after Hawa (2022).

== Awards and nominations ==
=== Babisas Award ===
Year	Events	Category	Nominee	Results	Ref
2023	Babisas Award	Best Film Actor	Shakib Khan	Won	
2023	Babisas Award	Best Film Actress	Idhika Paul	Won	
2023	Babisas Award	Best Actor in a Negative Role	Shahiduzzaman Selim	Won	
2023	Babisas Award	Best Director	Himel Ashraf	Won	
2023	Babisas Award	Best Music Director	Prince Mahmud	Won	
2023	Babisas Award	Best Lyricist	Shomeshwar Oli (Song: "Eshwar") Riyad	Won	
2023	Babisas Award	Best Playback Male Singer	Aqib Zaman Riyad	Won	
2023	Babisas Award	Best Playback Female Singer	Somnur Monir Konal	Won	
2023	Babisas Award	Best Film	Arshad Adnan	Won	

== Controversy ==
The first look poster of the film shows Shakib Khan with a lit cigarette on his lips. Despite the poster's depiction of smoking, there is no warning message, which created controversy and criticism. Many have complained that such scenes in the film's posters encourage smoking. In this context, the Bangladesh Anti-Tobacco Alliance issued a written statement condemning the violation of the Smoking and Use of Tobacco Products (Control) Act. Then later it was fixed by the filmmaker.

=== Online piracy ===
Several video clips of the film went viral on social media after its release; which is recorded from the audience on mobile phones. Director Himel Ashraf complained about this to Cybercrime authorities. He said that 22,000 video footage of the film was deleted from the internet.

== Impact ==
The first look of the film was released on 10 May 2023. Soon after its release, the poster went viral on social media. The authorities of 27 theatres contacted the film for booking for Eid release. After the release first song of the film "Qurbani Qurbani" on 24 June, it touched the milestone of 5 million views in 24 hours on Facebook and started trending on TikTok. The song titled "O Priyotoma" started no.1 trending on YouTube in Bangladesh after 13 days its release for 10 consecutive days. Also 35 on the Global Top Music Videos chart and 83 on the Global Top Songs chart.

It is the only 2023 Eid's film to run for two consecutive months at Star Cineplex.
