= Eshwar (song) =

Single by Prince Mahmud featuring Riyad

from the album Priyotoma
- Language: Bengali
- Released: 29 June 2023
- Recorded: 2023
- Studio: Tiger Media
- Genre: Soundtrack; Filmi; world; soft-rock
- Length: 4:03
- Label: Tiger Media; The Abhi Kathachitro
- Composer: Prince Mahmud
- Lyricist: Shomeshwar Oli
- Producers: Prince Mahmud; Arshad Adnan

Music video
- "Eshwar" on YouTube

"Eshwar" (Note: Bengali: ঈশ্বর; Bengali pronunciation: [iʃʃɔr]; Concept of God in Hinduism, with a wide range of meanings that depend on the era and the school of Hinduism.) is a Bangladeshi Bengali-language song sung by Riyad and composed by Prince Mahmud from the 2023 soundtrack album Priyotoma of the film of the same name, starring Shakib Khan and Idhika Paul. The song is written by Shomeshwar Oli and music arranged by Riyad, which released on 29 June 2023, the film's release date. The music video for the song was released on the same day under the music label Tiger Media.

The song was released on 29 June 2023 as a third single of the soundtrack and crossed over 50 million views on YouTube. Prince Mahmud made his comeback as composer in films after almost eight years with the song, who previously worked in Zero Degree in 2015. It is won thrice awards including Best Music Director, Best Lyricist and Best Male Playback Singer in the Special Honors category at the 22nd Babisas Awards.

== Background ==
"When director Himel decided to use the song in the film, that's when I started working on its composition. I usually compose the tune even before the lyrics. Later, I created the song based on Ali's lyrics. I always try to do something new. I have worked on this song from that perspective. Even before its use in the movie, everyone was excited about the song. After the movie's release, it finally reached everyone. I have worked on it in my own style."

— Prince Mahmud told The Business Standard about how he make the song

Prince Mahmud started preparing for the song "Eshwar" after hearing the story of the film Priyotoma from director Himel Ashraf. Prince Mahmud found the resonance of different tones in different atmospheres by listening to the story of the film. Himel Ashraf did not give Prince Mahmud any specific time to compose the song, he gave him complete freedom for the song. It takes him 30–35 days to make the entire song.

== Release ==
"Eshwar" features as third single from the 2023 soundtrack album Priyotoma of the film of the same name, starring Shakib Khan and Idhika Paul, which composed by Prince Mahmud, who had previously composed music for Mostofa Sarwar Farooki's Third Person Singular Number (2009) and Animesh Aich's Zero Degree (2015). However, he did not work regularly in film songs, this time he composed a song for the first time in a mainstream commercial film. After the release of the first song of the film, on 25 June, Prince Mahmud told Prothom Alo about the song, "The song is very good. Those who listened to our songs in the 90's will like it, and the audience of present generation will also like it." Lyrics written by Someshwar Oli, who collaborate with Mahmud for the first time, the song is sung by Akib Zaman Riyad, which is his debut film. It was revealed on June 29, the day Eid.

== Music credits ==
Credits adapted from Tiger Media.

- Prince Mahmud – composer
- Riyad – programmer, arranger
- Shomeshwar Oli – lyricist
- Riyad – vocals
- Moniruzzaman – dance director
- Shah Aayan Khan – graphic & animation
- Saiful Ratul – graphics designer

== Reception ==
=== Audience response ===
The song has received a huge response from the audience upon the release of the song and has received overwhelmingly positive response. Shakib Khan and Idhika Pal's chemistry in the song created a craze among the audience and started trending on social media including Facebook, YouTube and TikTok. Not only in Bangladesh, along with the Bengali speakers of India, the Hindi speakers are also in the "Eshwar" craze. Indian Bengali as well as Hindi speakers are also showed massive response.

=== Critical reviews ===
Tirthok Ahsan Rasel described the film's song as "superhit". No one should be forced to listen. Some songs have the potential to survive as songs for many, many years. The songs are also very comfortable to listen to. However, he criticized the song's video as a "music video". Fahim Muntasi at Bangla Movie Database mentioned "Eshwar" only song as good from the film. He noted, "One of the expected places in the film Priyotoma was a music. A film with established figures like Balam and Prince Mahmud is bound to have expectations. But to be honest I only liked one song from the film. Riyad's song "Eshwar" written by Shomeshwar Oli and composed by Prince Mahmud went with the mood of the story and was good to listen too." Rahman Moti praised the film's soundtrack. He wrote, the title track has done in Simple Way was a good song. Sea location added extra dimension to the film. Rupam Acharya described all the songs in the film as "simply amazing". Ahsan Rasel in Bangla Tribune wrote that as good as Prince Mahmud's song is, the depiction of the song in the film was not as good. Filmmaker and author Sadat Hossain mentioned this song as the best Eid's song.

== Records ==
The song crossed 8 million views on Tiger Media's YouTube in just seven days after its release. The song has crossed 50 million views so far. Also was trending on Facebook, YouTube and TikTok. The song was selected as one of the best song of 2023 by many of Bangladeshi media. Also its Singers, Lyricist and Composer was also selected as one of Best of the Year. (Note: Attributed to multiple sources:)

== Awards and nominations ==
Year	Events	Category	Nominee	Results	Ref
2023	Babisas Award	Best Music Director	Prince Mahmud	Won	
2023	Babisas Award	Best Lyricist	Shomeshwar Oli (Song: "Eshwar") Riyad	Won	
2023	Babisas Award	Best Male Playback Singer	Riyad	Won	
