= Akassh =

Indian Bengali composer (born 1986)

Akassh Sen
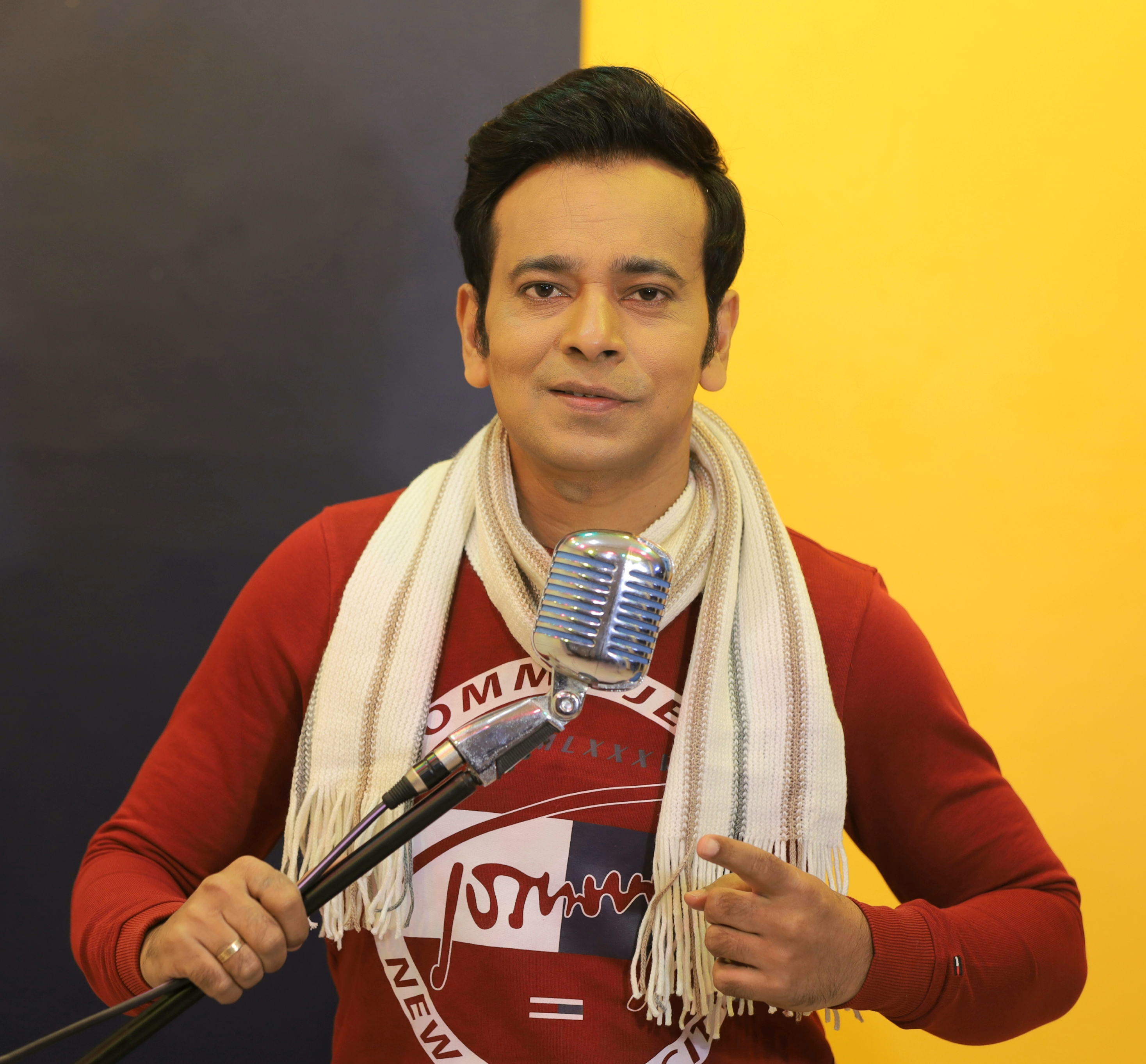

Background information
- Born: Akassh Sen; 20 March 1986 (age 40); Baharampur, Murshidabad, West Bengal, India.
- Occupations: Music Director, Composer, Singer
- Years active: 2004–present

Akassh Sen, known simply as Akassh, is a well known Indian Bengali music composer and singer.

== Career ==
He is a music director of Bengali feature films and television. He is also a singer and composer. His career started with his first album, Sweety, in 2004. Akassh Sen not only composes music for Indian films, but also composes music for the Bangladeshi films and albums as well. One of his most popular and prominent music compositions is "Kotobar Bojhabo Bol" from the film "Angaar" in the voice of Mohammad Irfan. In 2023, he composed the soundtrack of the highest grossing Bangladeshi film of all time Priyotoma, starring Shakib Khan and Idhika Paul. It received a massive response from audiences and one of his songs, named "O Priyotoma," crossed over 100 million views on YouTube in just three months.

== Discography ==
=== Studio albums ===
Year	Album	Music	Label	Reference
2004	Sweety	Akassh	Asha Audio	
2004	Vegetable Mix	Akassh	T-Series	
2004	Basanta	Akassh	T-Series	
2012	Guru	Akassh		
2017	Icche Gulo (with Kona)	Musfiq Litu	CMV	

=== Singles ===
Year	Title	Label	Notes	Music	Reference
2016	"Bhalobashar Ki Jadu"	CD Choice	From the Sultana Bibiana soundtrack	Akassh	
2016	"Reshmi Churi"		With Kona	Akassh	
2017	"Icche Gulo" (with Kona)	CMV	From collaborative album Icche Gulo	Musfiq Litu	
2017	"Toke Chara"	CD Plus		Akassh	
2017	"Boishakher Bikel Balay" (with Kona)	Eskay Music Unlimited Audio Video	Released for the holiday of Pahela Baishakh	Akassh	
2017	"Eai Bohagor Godhuli Bela"	Eskay Music	Assamese version of "Boishakher Bikel Balay" Released for the holiday of Bihu	Akassh	
2017	"Chupi Chupi"	Sangeeta Music		Akassh	
2017	"Tui Amar Mon" (with Kona)	CMV	Featured in the mini-web series Admission Test	Musfiq Litu	
2018	Maa	CD Choice Music		FA Pritom	
2018	Kon Akase Urbe Tumi	Sound Tek		Nazir Mahmud	
2018	Ajke Dekho	Suranjoli		Nazir Mahmud	
2018	"Sunnota"	My Sound		Amit Bhattacharjee	
2018	"Mon Boleche"	Suranjoli		Musfiq Litu	
2018	"Gentlemen"	Max Bag Entertainment		Akassh	
2018	"Sweety"	Live Technology Ltd		Akassh	
2018	"Bojhena Shey"	Ron Music		Amit Bhattacharjee	
2018	"Durga Maa" (with Haimanti)	Eskay Music	New song on the occasion of Durga Puja	Akassh Sen	
2018	Tu Hi Dil	Akassh Sen		Akassh	
2018	Sundori	Ron's Music		Amit	
2018	Abujh Mon	Dead Line Music		Remo Biplob	
2018	Toke Chara	CD Plus Music		Akassh	
2018	Chuyecho ei Mon	My Sound		Amit	
2018	Dhakaiya Maiya Kolkatar Babu	ZS Entertainment		Nazir Mamud	
2018	Rongila Picture	ZS Entertainment		Nazir Mamud	
2019	Long Drive	Chomotkar Music		Akassh	
2019	O Shona	MR Bestmedia		FA Pritom	
2019	Prem Peyasi	Padma Music		FA Pritom	
2019	Olpo Olpo Kotha	Padma Music		Plabon Koresh	
2019	Lal Shari	ZS Entertainment		Akassh	

=== Film soundtracks ===
==== As composer ====
Denotes films that have not yet been released

Year	Film	Song	Label	Reference
2009	Friend	All Songs		
2010	Bastob	All Songs		
2010	Fire Elam Jabab Dite	All Songs		
2010	Joker	All Songs		
2011	Ek Tukro Tara	All Songs		
2012	Most Welcome	"Ke Kahar"	Monsoon	
2012	Tor Naam	"Tor Naam" "Confusion" "O Bondhu Re"	Weird Industries	
2013	Golemale Pirit Koro Na	All Songs	SVF Music	
2013	Nishwartha Bhalobasa – What is Love?	"Dhakar Pola" "What is Love" "Sajnaa" "Dhakar Pola – Remix"	Monsoon	
2014	Ami Shudhu Cheyechi Tomay	"Bangladesher Meye"	Eskay Music	
2014	Most Welcome 2	"Chicken Tandoori" "Tor Jadoo" "Manush"	Monsoon	
2014	Action	All Songs		
2015	Romeo vs Juliet	"Romeo Juliet" "Shohag Chand"	Eskay Music Jaaz Music	
2015	Cocktail	All Songs		
2015	Bawal	All Songs	KR Movies & Entertainment	
2015	Swapno Je Tui	"Tor Choke te Cheye" "Priyotomo" "College er Din"		
2015	Agnee 2	"Akk Khan Chummu" "Baanjaara"	Eskay Music Jaaz Music	
2016	Ostitto	"Tor Name Likhechi"	Action Cut Entertainment	
2016	Mental	"Amar Moton ke Ache Bolo"	Banglaxpress	
2016	Angaar	"Kotobar Bujhabo Bol"	Eskay Music Jaaz Music	
2016	Badsha – The Don	"Mubarak Eid Mubarak"	Eskay Music Jaaz Music	
2016	Rokto	"Pori" "Heartbeat" "Jante Jodi Chao"	Eskay Music Jaaz Music	
2016	Bossgiri	"Mon Toke Chara"	Khan Films	
2016	Ami Tomar Hote Chai	"Heila Duila Nach"		
2017	Premi O Premi	All Songs	Jaaz Music	
2017	Sultana Bibiana	"Bhalobashay Ki Jadu"		
2017	Nabab	"O DJ O DJ"	Eskay Music Jaaz Music	
2018	Ami Neta Hobo	"Lal Lipstick"	Eskay Music	
2018	Bizli	Party Party Party		
2018	Bizli	Ure Ure Mon	Bobstar Films	
2018	Poramon 2	Number One Hero		
2018	Poramon 2	Suto Kata Guri	Jaaz Music	
2018	Purnimar Chad	Purnimar Chad	Akassh Sen	
2018	Ami Mukhyo Mantri Hobo	Chol Jabo Tor Parai	Akassh Sen	
2018	Chittagainga Powa Noakhailla Maiya	Golapi Golapi		
2018	Chittagainga Powa Noakhailla Maiya	Keno Ajkal	Shapla Media	Unlimited Audio Video
2018	Super Hero	Tomak Apon Kore	Unlimited Audio Video	
2018	Mone Rekho	Bondhu Bine Pran Bache Na		
2018	Mone Rekho	Korbo Rate Call	Heart Bit	
2018	Captain Khan	Kanchan Pirit	Jaaz Music	
2018	Dahan	Hazir Biriyani	Jaaz Music	
2019	Tui Amar Rani	Misti (Item Song)	Prince Entertainment P4	
2019	Password	Eid Mubarak	SK Films	
2020	Bir	Tumi Amar Jibon	SK Films	
2023	Priyotoma	Qurbani Qurbani; O Priyotoma	Tiger Media SK Films	
2024	Rajkumar	Rajkumar	Versatile Media	

==== As singer ====
Year	Film	Song	Co-singer(s)	Label	Reference
2009	Friend	"Papa I Love You" "Shakalaka Boom Boom"			
2012	Tor Naam	"College Campus e"		Weird Industries	
2013	Golemale Pirit Koro Na	"Golemale Pirit Korona" "Sudhu Bolte Chai"		SVF Music	
2013	Nishwartha Bhalobasa – What is Love?	"Dhakar Pola" "Dhakar Pola – Remix"		Monsoon	
2014	Ami Shudhu Cheyechi Tomay	"Bangladesher Meye"		Eskay Music	
2014	Most Welcome 2	"Tor Jadu"		Monsoon	
2014	Action	"Action Title Track"			
2015	Romeo vs Juliet	"Romeo Juliet" "Shohag Chand"		Eskay Music Jaaz Music	
2015	Cocktail	"Chirodini Tomar" "Disco Theker Joy"			
2015	Bawal	"Bawal Suru Holo" "Du Choke Tor Swapne"		KR Movies & Entertainment	
2016	Ostitto	"Tor Name Likhechi Hridoy"		Action Cut Entertainment	
2016	Mental	"Amar Moton Ke Ache Bolo"		Banglaxpress	
2016	Angaar	"Kotobar Bojhabo"		Eskay Music Jaaz Music	
2016	Badshah – The Don	"Mubarak Eid Mubarak"		Eskay Music Jaaz Music	
2016	Rokto	"Pori"	Kanika Kapoor	Eskay Music Jaaz Music	
2016	Bossgiri	"Mon Toke Chara"		Khan Films	
2016	Ami Tomar Hote Chai	"Heila Duila Nach"	Kona		
2016	Sultana Bibiana	"Bhalobashay Ki Jadu"			
2017	Premi O Premi	"Premi O Premi"		Jaaz Music	
2017	Premi O Premi	"Chok Chok Korlei"	Lemis	Jaaz Music	
2017	Nabab	"O DJ O DJ"	Kona	Eskay Music Jaaz Music	
	Hridoyer Ayna	Title Track	Trisha Chatterjee	Unlimited Audio Video	
2018	Ami Neta Hobo	"Lal Lipstick"	Trisha Chatterjee	Eskay Music	
2019	Password	"Eid Mubarak"	Solo	SK Films	
2023	Priyotoma	Qurbani Qurbani	Solo	Tiger MediaSK Films	

== Awards and nominations ==
Year	Award	Category	Song	Album	Result
2012	Mirchi Music Awards Bangla	Best Bangla Band Album	All Songs	Guru	Nominated

Year	Award	Category	Song	Film	Result
2013	Mirchi Music Awards Bangla	Best Upcoming Music Director	Tor Naam	Tor Naam	Won
2015	Tele Cine Awards	Best Music Director	Bangladesher Meye	Ami Shudhu Cheyechi Tomay	Nominated
2018	I Star Award (Bangladesh)	Best Singer	Number One hero	PoraMon 2	Won
