= Cinema of Bangladesh =

Bangladeshi films

- No. of screens: 72 (September, 2026) (Including 33 single screen theaters and 39 multiplex screen theaters in total 44 locations.)
  - Per capita: 0.2 per 100,000 (2016)
- Main distributors: Tiger Media; Chorki; Alpha-i; Jaaz Multimedia; Impress Telefilm

Produced feature films (2025)
- Total: 46 (Theatrical films)

Gross box office (2024)
- Total: ৳165 crore (US$13 million) (est.)

The Cinema of Bangladesh, locally known as Bengali cinema in Bangladesh, is a diverse and vibrant entity, consisting of films produced across various regions in Bangladesh, each contributing its unique linguistic and cultural perspective. Beyond the dominant Dhaka based Bengali-language film industry Dhallywood (Bengali: ঢালিউড), which is a portmanteau of "Dhaka" and "Hollywood", Bangladesh is home to cinema in several other languages and dialects. For instance, Marma, Kokborok and Chakma cinema from Chittagong Hill Tracts, Garo and Mymensinghi cinema from Mymensingh division, Meitei, Khasi and Sylheti cinema from Sylhet, Chatgaiya cinema from Chittagong, Noakhailla cinema from Noakhali, Barishailla cinema from Barishal, Dhakaiya cinema from Dhaka and other dialects and languages. These regional cinemas play a crucial role in preserving and promoting the linguistic and cultural heritage of the country. The dominant style of Bangladeshi cinema is melodramatic cinema, which developed from 1947 to 1990 and characterizes most films to this day. Cinema was introduced in Bangladesh in 1898 by the Bradford Bioscope Company, credited to have arranged the first film release in Bangladesh. Between 1913 and 1914, the first production company, Picture House, was opened. A 1928 short silent film titled Sukumari (lit. 'The Good Girl') was the first Bengali-produced film in the region. The first full-length film, The Last Kiss, was released in 1931.

Following the separation of Bangladesh from Pakistan, Dhaka became the center of the Bangladeshi film industry, and has generated the majority share of revenue, production and audiences for Dhallywood films. Mukh O Mukhosh, the first Bengali-language full-length feature film, was produced in 1956. During the 1970s, many Dhallywood films were inspired by Indian films, with some of the films being unofficial remakes of those films. The industry continued to grow, and many successful Bangladeshi films were produced throughout the 1970s, 1980s and the first half of the 1990s.

Directors such as Fateh Lohani, Zahir Raihan, Alamgir Kabir, Khan Ataur Rahman, Subhash Dutta, Ehtesham, Chashi Nazrul Islam, Kazi Hayat, Sheikh Niamat Ali, Tauquir Ahmed, Tanvir Mokammel, Tareque Masud, Morshedul Islam, Humayun Ahmed, Kamar Ahmad Simon, Mostofa Sarwar Farooki, Redoan Rony, Rezwan Shahriar Sumit, Abdullah Mohammad Saad Himel Ashraf, Raihan Rafi, and others have made significant contributions to Bangladeshi mainstream cinema, parallel cinema, and art films. Some have also won global acclaim.

== History ==
=== Origin ===
On 28 December 1895, the Lumière brothers began commercial bioscope shows in Paris, with the first bioscope shows of the Indian subcontinent occurring the following year, including one in Calcutta and another at the Crown Theatre in Dhaka. The Bradford Bioscope Company of Calcutta arranged the show, which featured very short news items and other short features including footage of the jubilee of Queen Victoria, battles between Greek and Turkish forces, and the French underground railway. The price of a ticket to the show was an expensive eight anas to three taka. Bioscope shows continued to be shown throughout the region, including in Bhola, Manikganj, Gazipur, Rajbari, and Faridpur. These became the first films ever to be released in Bangladesh.

At the time when Calcutta-based film production houses were forming, East Bengal cinema halls were showing films produced in Calcutta, Bombay, Madras, Hollywood, and Paris. Sequential bioscope shows were started in Dhaka in 1913–14 in a jute store. It was named Picture House, becoming the first theater to be built in present-day Bangladesh.

=== Silent era ===
In 1927–28, the Dhaka nawab family produced a short film named Sukumari (The Good Girl). The film's producers included Khaza Adil, Khaza Akmol, Khaza Nasirulla, Khaza Azmol, Khaza Zohir, Khaza Azad, Soyod Shahebe Alom, and professor Andalib Shadini. They wanted to make a film with their own actors and without the help of a studio. The male lead was played by Khaza Nosrulla, and the female lead was played by a male actor named Syed Abdus Sobhan owing to laws against the depiction of women in film. Nosrulla went on to become a politician and Sobhan became the first Bengali secretary of the Pakistan Central Civil Service. One still picture of Sukumary is kept in Bangladesh Film Archive.

After the success of Sukumari, the royal family went for a bigger venture. To make a full-length silent film, a temporary studio was made in the gardens of the family, and they produced a full-length silent film titled The Last Kiss, released in 1931. The main actor was Khaza Azmol. The physical teacher of Jagannath College, Ambujgupta, directed the film and made the Bengali and English subtitles for it. Professor Andalib Shadani of the Dhaka University made the Urdu subtitles. The Last Kiss was released in the Mukul Hall of Dhaka. Historian Dr. Romesh Chondro Mojumder started the premier show of the film. The print of the film was taken to the Aurora Company of Calcutta for bigger presentation. The developers of the film wanted to make Dhaka unique in art, literature and cinema and named their production house “Dhaka East Bengal Cinematograph Society”. It was the first film-producing organization of Bangladesh.

=== Early development ===
==== Pakistan era ====
By 1947, there were around 80 cinemas in Bangladesh.After the partition of India in 1947, there were efforts to turn Dhaka into East Bengal's cultural center, with various individuals like Abbasuddin Ahmed creating short-lived film production companies in the city. In March 1948, when the Governor-General of Pakistan Mohammad Ali Jinnah came to visit East Pakistan, the radio broadcaster and filmmaker Nazir Ahmed was commissioned to create the informational film In Our Midst with the help of Calcutta-based film technicians. It was the first informational film of Bangladesh.

==== 1950s ====
Two years after the creation of the Bengali language movement in 1952, the film-making company Co-operative Film Makers, Ltd. was formed in Dhaka under the leadership of Shohidul Alam, Abdul Jabbar Khan, and Kazi Nuruzzaman. The company produced Salamot (1954) under the direction of Nazir Ahmed. The film was commercially successful and allowed the company to grow. In 1955, during the rule of the United Front, Chief Secretary N.M. Khan created a film studio and laboratory in Dhaka's Tejgaon Thana. The first full-length feature film with sound made in East Pakistan was The Face and the Mask, which was directed by Abdul Jabbar Khan and released on 3 August 1956. Editing, printing and all other film processing for this movie were done in Lahore, Pakistan. Abdul Jabbar directed and starred in the film, which also starred Inam Ahmed, Purnima Sen, and Nazma.

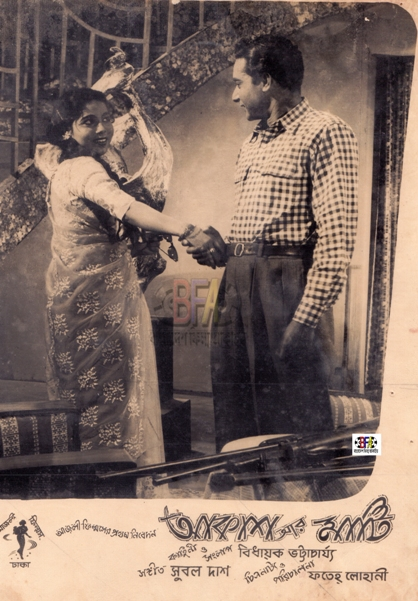
Akash Ar Mati (1959)

"The East Pakistan Film Development Corporation Bill, 1957", establishing a national film development corporation, was introduced by Sheikh Mujibur Rahman, the founding father of Bangladesh. The bill was passed in the East Bengal Provincial Assembly, and Nazir Ahmed was appointed as the first creative director.

Initially, the East Pakistan Film Development Corporation allowed only specific directors to make films. Fateh Lohani directed the rural art film Asiya, the first film produced by the East Pakistan Film Development Corporation, with Nazir Ahmed supervising the production. Asiya received the President Award for best Bangla film in 1961. Other early films released by the East Pakistan Film Development Corporation include Akash Ar Mati (The Sky and The Earth), a song film directed by Fateh Lohani in 1959.

A. J. Kardar directed the Bengali-Urdu film The Day Shall Dawn in 1959, with Zahir Raihan working as the assistant director. The film was based on the 1936 Bengali novel Padma Nadir Majhi (The Boatman on The River Padma) by Bengali novelist Manik Bandopadhyay. It was an internationally acclaimed movie. The film was submitted as the Pakistani entry for the Academy Award for Best Foreign Language Film at the 32nd Academy Awards, but was not accepted as a nominee. It was also entered into the 1st Moscow International Film Festival, where it won a Golden Medal.

The establishment of the East Pakistan Film Development Corporation led to the growth of the East Bengal film industry and gave rise to three prominent studios: the Popular Studio, Bari Studio, and Bengal Studio. Prominent directors Abdul Jabbar Khan, Fateh Lohani, Ehtesham, and Mohiuddin worked with these studios. Notable films from these directors include Matir Pahar (The Clay Hill) (1959) by Mohiuddin and E Desh Tomar Amar (1959) by Ehtesham. The East Pakistan Film Development Corporation's own films sometimes struggled to achieve financial success.

==== 1960s ====
During the late 1960s, 20-35 films were produced every year. Fateh Lohani's Asiya and Ehtesham's Rajdhanir Buke (In the heart of the capital) were both positively reviewed by critics. In addition to directing, Lohani also acted in a number of East Bengali films throughout the 1960s, including Tanha (1964), Agun Niye Khela (1967) and Julekha (1967). Other notable directors of the 1960s include Salahuddin, who made a number of social drama films like Je Nodi Morupothe (1961), and Khan Ataur Rahman, who directed Nawab Sirajuddaula (1967). Rahman was also an actor and a singer, and featured in Kokhono Asheni (Never Came) (1961), Kancher Deyal (Crystal Wall) (1963).

Zahir Raihan was a star director of East Bengali cinema in the 1960s, and directed films like Kokhono Asheni (Never Came) (1961), Shangam (1964) (The first Pakistani colour film), and Jibon Theke Neya. Jibon Theke Neya, a political satire based on the Bengali Language Movement under the rule of Pakistan, is considered a classic of Bangladeshi cinema.

Some notable actors from the 1960s include Rahman, Sumita Devi, Khan Ataur Rahman, Rawshan Jamil, Anwar Hossain, Anwara Begum, Golam Mustafa, Abdur Razzak, Kabori Sarwar, Shabana, Farida Akhter Bobita, Farooque, Shabnam, Shawkat Akbar, Rosy Samad, Baby Zaman, and Kohinoor Akhter Shuchanda. The most well-known Bangladeshi actor to date had been Abdur Razzak, who was deemed the Nayok Raaj Rajjak (King of Heroes) by his fans. He started his career as a side actor in 1965 and became a leading actor in 1967. Abdur Razzak and Kabori Sarwar was the most popular pair from 1967 to the 1970s.

=== After independence ===
==== 1970s ====
A total of 41 films were released in 1970, including Shorolipi by Nazrul Islam, Taka Ana Paay and the Jibon Theke Neya by Zahir Raihan.

Jibon Theke Neya, considered a milestone film in the history of Bengali cinema, was a political satire based on the Bengali language movement under the rule of Pakistan. It stars Shaukat Akbar, Anwar Hossain, Khan Ataur Rahman, Rawshan Jamil, Abdur Razzak, Kohinoor Akhter Shuchanda, Amjad Hossain and Rosy Samad. The film has been described as an example of "national cinema", using discrete local traditions to build a representation of the Bangladeshi national identity. Other significant works of 1970 were Mishor Kumari of Karigir, Tansen of Rafiqul Bari, Bindu Theke Britto of Rebeka, Binimoy of Subhash Dutta, Kothay Jeno Dekhechi of Nizamul Hoque.

Only 6 Bengali films and two Urdu films made in East Bengal were released in 1971 before the Bangladesh Liberation War. Some notable social drama films include Nacher Putul by Ashok Ghosh, Sritituku Thak by Alamgir Kumkum, and Shukh Dukkho by Khan Ataur Rahman.

Following the outbreak of the Bangladesh Liberation War, Raihan made the documentary Stop Genocide to draw attention to the plight of the people of East Bengal. It was one of the first internationally acclaimed films of Bangladesh.

In December 1971, the East Pakistan Film Development Corporation changed its name to the Bangladesh Film Development Corporation, which had the only major film studio and colour lab of the Bangladeshi film industry until the 2010s. Most Bangladeshi films were produced from this studio. Production quantity continued to increase after Bangladesh gained its independence; by the 1990s, over 90 films per year were released. At that time, the film department was under the leadership of Abdul Jabbar Khan. The Bangladeshi film industry was successful both critically and commercially through the first half of the 1990s.

Many Bangladeshi movies of the 1970s were about the war. The first full-length feature film of independent Bangladesh was Ora Egaro Jon released in 1972. The movie was directed by Chashi Nazrul Islam. Other filmmakers who made critically acclaimed war films in the 1970s include Alamgir Kabir, Chashi Nazrul Islam, and Subhash Dutta. Three of Kabir's feature films are featured in the "Top 10 Bangladeshi Films" critics' choice list by the British Film Institute. His films include Dhire Bohe Meghna (1973), Shurjo Konya (1976), Shimana Periye (1977), Rupali Shoykte (1979), Mohona (1982), Porinita (1984) and Mohanayok (1985). Other notable directors in the 1970s include Narayan Ghosh Mita, Abdullah al Mamun, Johirul Haque, and Amjad Hossain. Haque's Rongbaaj was one of the first commercial action films of Bangladesh.

After independence, one of the first international acclaimed film was A River Called Titas released in 1973, directed by prominent Indian Bengali director Ritwik Ghatak and starring Prabir Mitra in the lead role. Titash Ekti Nadir Naam topped the list of 10 best Bangladeshi films in the audience and critics' polls conducted by the British Film Institute in 2002. Some other notable films of 1970s include Joy Bangla (1972) of Fakrul Alom; Lalon Fokir (1972) of Syed Hasan Imam; Obhuj Mon (1972) of Kazi Jhohir; Shongram (1974) by Chashi Nazrul Islam, Arunodoyer Agnishakkhi (1972), Bashundhara (1977) by Subhash Dutta; Alor Michil (1974), Lathial (1975) by Narayan Ghosh Mita; Megher Onek Rong (1976) by Harunur Rashid; Golapi Ekhon Traine (1978) by Amjad Hossain; Sareng Bou (1978) by Abdullah al Mamun; Oshikkhito (1978) by Azizur Rahman; The Father (1979) by Kazi Hayat, and Surjo Dighal Bari (1979) by Sheikh Niamat Ali and Moshiuddin Shaker. Surjo Dighal Bari was a critically acclaimed movie and it re-introduced Bangladeshi films to the international audience. The movie was based on a novel of the same name by Abu Ishaque. In 1975, the government started a national film award, as well as a donation fund for creative films.

==== 1980s ====
The 1970s and 1980s were a golden era for Bangladeshi film industry commercially and critically. At this time, a lot of actors and actresses enjoyed popularity, including Abdur Razzak who was the most successful actor commercially during this period, as well as Kabori Sarwar, Shabana, Farida Akhter Bobita, Farooque, Shabnam, Kohinoor Akhter Shuchanda, Alamgir, Sohel Raana, Amol Bose, Bulbul Ahmed, Zafar Iqbal, Wasim, Ilias Kanchan, Jashim, Rozina, Parveen Sultana Diti, Champa and others.

In the 1980s, most of the Bangladeshi commercial films were influenced in film-making, style and presentation by Indian movies, mostly Hindi movies from Maharashtra. However, many of the films were original or adaptations of literary works. Some notable original and adapted films include Chhutir Ghonta (1980) by Azizur Rahman; Emiler Goenda Bahini (1980) by Badal Rahman; Shokhi Tumi Kar (1980), Akhoni Shomoy (1980) by Abdullah Al Mamun; Lal Shobujer Pala (1980), Obichar (1985) by Syed Hasan Imam; Koshai (1980), Jonmo Theke Jolchi (1981), Bhat De (1984) by Amjad Hossain; Devdas (1982), Chandranath (1984), Shuvoda (1987) by Chashi Nazrul Islam; Smriti Tumi Bedona (1980) by Dilip Shom; Mohona (1982), Porinita (1986) by Alamgir Kabir; Boro Bhalo Lok Chhilo (1982) by Mohammad Mohiuddin; Puroshkar (1983) by C.B Zaman; Maan Shomman (1983) by A.J Mintu; Nazma (1983), Shokal-Shondha (1984), Fulshojja (1986) by Subhash Dutta; Rajbari (1984) by Kazi Hayat; Grihilokkhi (1984) by Kamal Ahmed; Dahan (1986) by Sheikh Niamat Ali; Shot Bhai (1985) by Abdur Razzak; Ramer Shumoti (1985) by Shahidul Amin; Rajlokkhi-Srikanto (1986) by Bulbul Ahmed; Harano Shur (1987) by Narayan Ghosh Mita; Dayi Ke (1987) by Aftab Khan Tulu; Tolpar (1988) by Kabir Anowar and Biraj Bou (1988) by Mohiuddin Faruk.

The parallel cinema movement was officially started from this decade, though many off-track movies were made of different genres from the 60s. However, the 80s movies were strictly commercial influenced by Indian Hindi commercial films, so there was a necessity of a realism and naturalism cinema movement. The movement was started by Alamgir Kabir. From this movement some intellectual filmmakers came such as, Tanvir Mokammel, Tareque Masud and Morshedul Islam.

==== 1990s ====
In the 1990s, most of the Bangladeshi movies were dominated by mainstream commercial movies. Many successful films were produced in this time. The definition of Bangla mainstream commercial movies had changed, because most of the movies were very much influenced by commercial Indian Hindi movies and most of them were direct copies from those Indian commercial Hindi films full with action, dance, song and jokes. During this era, some new directors and actors came to the industry. Intellectual Directors such as Tanvir Mokammel, Tareque Masud, Morshedul Islam, Humayun Ahmed, Nasiruddin Yousuff, Akhtaruzzaman and Mustafizur Rahman made some critically and internationally acclaimed films at that time. Two of Tanvir Mokammel's feature films are featured in the "Top 10 Bangladeshi Films" list by British Film Institute's critics choice.

The 1990s marked the debut of Salman Shah, referred to as the "Prince of Bangladeshi Cinema" and the "First Superstar of Modern Dhallywood". Often regarded as a popular and influential actor, he starred in various films, including Ontare Ontare, Ei Ghor Ei Songsar, Sujan Sakhi, Mayer Odhikar and Anondo Osru; of the list, Shopner Thikana, Sotter Mrittu Nei and Keyamat Theke Keyamat exist as the top ten highest-grossing films in the Dhallywood box office. His death in 1996 evoked public reactions of grief and brought the film industry to a standstill.

Some other successful male actors during this time were Alamgir, Jashim, Ilias Kanchan, Nayeem, Manna, Riaz, Ferdous Ahmed, Rubel, Amin Khan and Omar Sani.

Among successful female actors were Shabana, Champa, Dolly Johur, Suchorita, Shabnaz. Some notable films from this decade include Padma Nadir Majhi by Indian director Goutam Ghose, Padma Meghna Jamuna by Chashi Nazrul Islam, Pita Mata Sontan and Banglar Bodhu by A. J. Mintu, Aguner Poroshmoni and Srabon Megher Din by Humayun Ahmed, Desh Premik by Kazi Hayat, Anya Jibon by Sheikh Niamat Ali, Poka Makorer Ghor Bosoti by Akhtaruzzaman, Dukhai by Morshedul Islam, Hothat Brishti by Indian director Basu Chatterjee and Chitra Nodir Pare by Tanvir Mokammel. In the late 90s, Sohanur Rahman Sohan's Ananta Bhalobasha (1999) was the turning point of Bangladeshi cinema by introducing Shakib Khan, who is now one of the biggest superstars in the industry.

=== 21st century ===
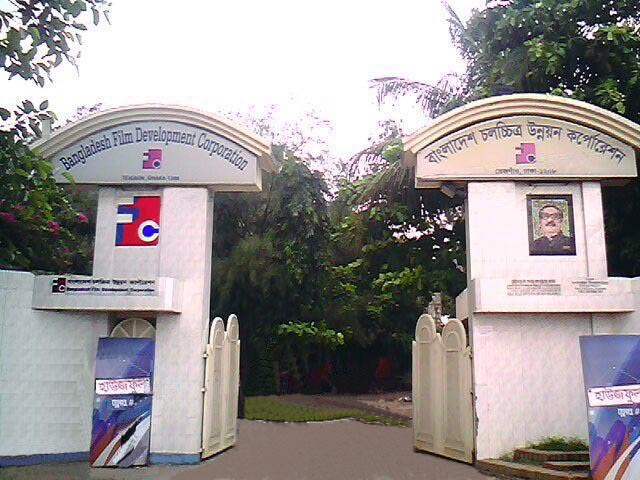
Bangladesh Film Development Corporation main gate in 2011

==== 2000s ====
During the 2000s, most Bangladeshi films underperformed commercially and Bangladesh produced about 100 low-budget movies a year. Viewership of Bangladeshi films in general dropped, and the industry was criticized for producing low-quality films whose only appeal was that of cheap melodrama.

After a drastic decline in the 2000s, the Bangladeshi film industry tried to bounce back after 2006–07. With the help of the Bangladeshi Government and the emergence of big production companies, the Bangladeshi film industry started growing slowly.

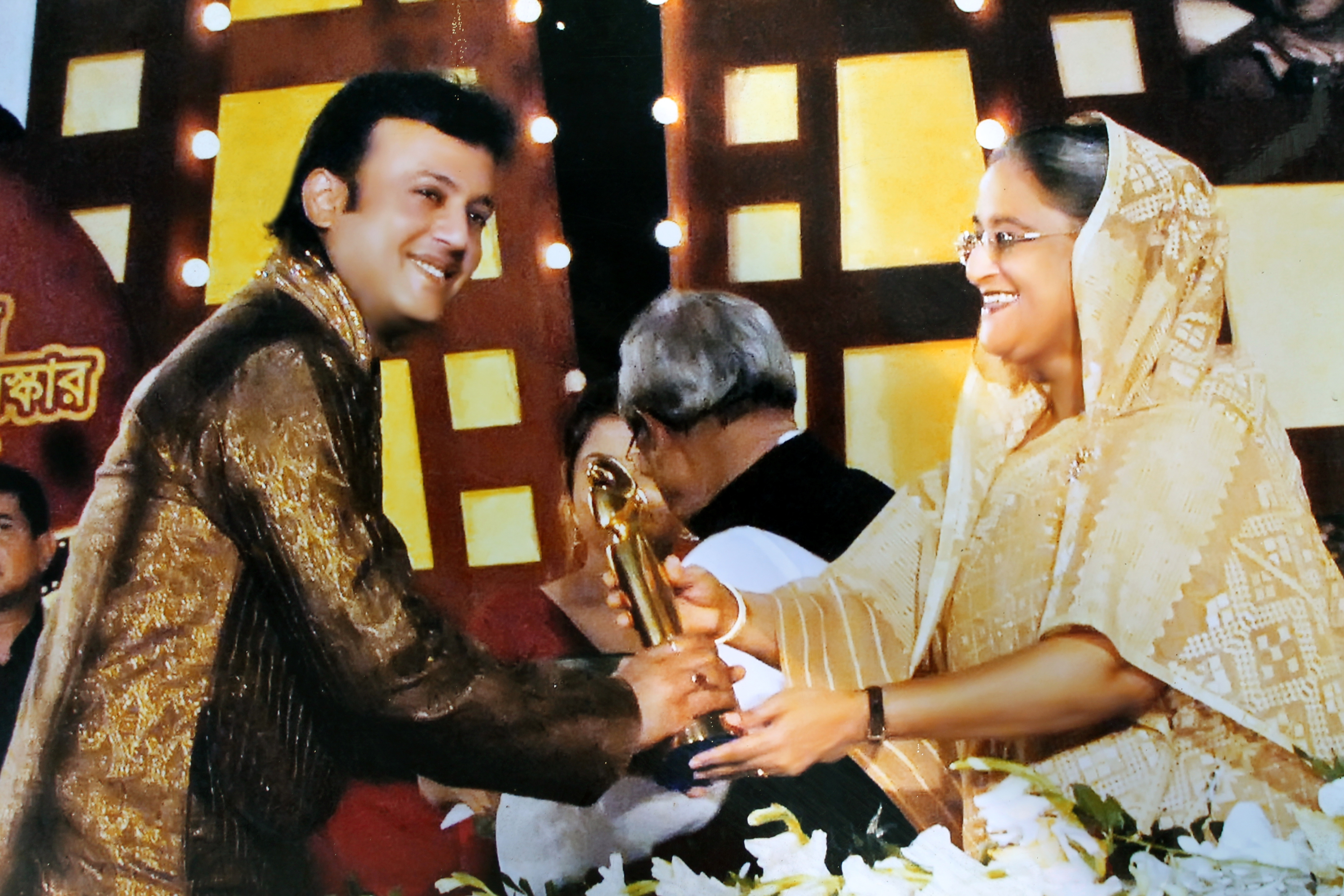
Riaz receiving the National Award 2008 from then Prime minister Sheikh Hasina in 2010

Among the successful films that released in the 2000s are Ammajan, Premer Taj Mahal, Wrong Number, Shasti, Shyamol Chhaya, Hridoyer Kotha, Daruchini Dwip, Monpura, Priya Amar Priya, Koti Takar Kabin, Chacchu, Khairun Sundori, Amar Praner Swami, Pitar Ason, Tumi Swapno Tumi Shadhona, Mone Prane Acho Tumi, Amar Shopno Tumi, Bolbo Kotha Bashor Ghore, among others. Besides critically acclaimed films like Kittonkhola, Lalsalu, Hason Raja ,Matir Moyna, Bachelor, Joyjatra, Hajar Bachhor Dhore, Ghani and Chandragrohon were produced in this decade. Most of the successful films during this period starred Manna (until his death in 2008) followed by Shakib Khan, Riaz, and Ferdous Ahmed. Leading female actors included Moushumi, Shabnur, Popy and Champa.

==== 2010s ====
Since 2012, Bangladesh has developed several big production and distribution companies, such as Monsoon Films, Jaaz Multimedia and Tiger Media Limited, and the films produced by them have been doing better business than others due to their large budget and glamorous appearance. Four of the top ten highest grossing Bangladeshi films were released in the 2010s. In 2014, India's Reliance Entertainment Limited had expressed their interest in producing Bangladeshi films. However, the Bangladesh Film Corporation didn't respond due to the ban on Indian films in Bangladesh. A notable film released in 2010 was named Jaago, directed by Khijir Hayat Khan. Jaago is the first sports-based film in Bangla Cinema. Top actors during this period included Shakib Khan, Ananta Jalil, Arifin Shuvo, Bappy Chowdhury, Symon Sadik, and Jayed Khan.

==== 2020s ====
In the 2020s, a new wave of cinema was moving through the Bangladeshi film industry. Started during the COVID-19 pandemic, OTT consumption increased largely in the country. New Bangladeshi platforms like Chorki and Binge became popular. Films like Poran, Hawa, Operation Sundarbans, Damal, Leader: Amie Bangladesh we released. In mid-2023, Priyotoma was released in Bangladesh and all over the world, which became the fastest gross figure collection in the history of Bangladeshi Cinema and the highest grossing Bangladeshi film of all time. Some notable new wave directors include Abdullah Mohammad Saad, Ashfaque Nipun, Raihan Rafi, and Himel Ashraf.

== Government support ==
The government of Bangladesh played a huge role in the re-emergence of Bangladeshi films. The Bangladesh Film Development Corporation was established as an assistance hub for Bangladeshi cinema. The government also spends about $1 million annually for the development of Bangladeshi parallel cinema and art cinema. Awami League government spent more than $10 million in 2012 and 2014–15 for the modern technical supports in Bangladeshi cinema.

== Independent films ==
Stop Genocide (1971), the documentary made by Zahir Raihan, is one of the first independent films in Bangladesh. The film was funded by the newly formed Expatriate Government of Bangladesh, staying in India while the country was battling with the Pakistan Army. Some other critics like Zakir Hossain Raju identified Suryo Dighal Bari (The Ominous House) (1979) as the first independent film funded by Bangladesh Government after independence in 1971 and it was made within the production and distribution network by Bangladesh Film Development Corporation (BFDC), one of the major film studios in Bangladesh. The film first gained international success in the post liberation era, though it experienced different constraints in releasing and screening in theatres at home.

Agami (1984) was the starting point of independent filmmaking. Because of the critical and commercial success of Agami, independent filmmaking became a movement. The movement was popularly known as 'short film movement', and later as 'alternative film movement'. The movement took shape after the critical and commercial success of Agami by Morshedul Islam and Hooliya (Wanted) 1984) by Tanvir Mokammel. Agami got the silver peacock in the best director category in Delhi International Film Festival. Hooliya also got admirations from critics and audience.

These films were funded by directors themselves with support of friends and family members and were shown outside cinema theatres. The directors were involved in the entire process of the filmmaking: writing scripts, funding, making and screening. These two films were shown together in different corners of the country and these are real examples of independent films: low and independent funds, alternative distribution channels, shot in 16 mm, without any studio involvement or commercial motives; and in content, very much related with national culture and politics. With this set standard and format, a lot of young makers came forward later and a movement started. However, while the contemporary mainstream films have failed to achieve any accolades at home or abroad; directors of the independent genre, such as Tareque Masud and Catherine Masud, Tanvir Mokammel, Morshedul Islam and Abu Sayeed, have gained national and international recognition. Matir Moina by Masud is the most famous independent film and also the most prominent film so far from Bangladesh. Some other good independent films of Bangladesh are: Ekattorer Jishu by Nasiruddin Yousuf Bachchu; Chaka (1993) and Dipu Number Two (1996) by Morshedul Islam; Nodir Naam Modhumoti (1996), Chitra Nodir Pare (1999), Lalshalu (2001), Lalon (2004) by Tanvir Mokammel; Muktir Gaan (1995) and Ontarjatra (2006) by Tareque Masud and Catherine Masud; and Swopnodanay (2007) by Golam Robbani Biplob.

== Film production and distribution house ==
Right now, there are more than 50 production houses in the Bangladeshi film industry, but few have managed to be successful in the market. Such production houses and distribution houses have helped Bangladeshi movies to reach a national and international platform, releasing films and distributing them to audiences overseas. Some well-known production houses in the present Bangladeshi cinema include Impress Telefilm, Chorki, Monsoon Films, Jaaz Multimedia, Tiger Media Limited and Alpha-i.

== International recognition of Bangladeshi cinema ==
Internationally acclaimed Bangladeshi films include Zahir Raihan's Stop Genocide (1971); Ritwik Ghatak's A river called Titas (1973); Sheikh Niamat Ali and Moshiuddin Shaker's Surja Dighal Bari (1979); Tanvir Mokammel's Hooliya (1984), Nadir Naam Modhumati (1995) Quiet Flows the River Chitra (1999), Lalsalu (2001) and Lalon (2004); Morshedul Islam's Agami (1984), Chaka (1993), Dipu Number Two (1996), Dukhai (1997), Duratta (2004) and Amar Bondhu Rashed (2011); Tareque Masud's The Inner Strength (1989), Song of Freedom (1995), Story of Freedom (1999) and The Clay Bird (2002); Humayun Ahmed's Aguner Poroshmoni (1994) and Shyamol Chhaya (2004); Abu Sayeed's kittonkhola (2000), Shankhonad (2004), Rupantor (2008); Enamul Karim Nirjhar's Aha! (2007); Golam Rabbany Biplob's On the Wings of Dreams (2007); Mostofa Sarwar Farooki's Bachelor (2003), Third Person Singular Number (2009), Television (2013) and No Bed of Roses; Tauquir Ahmed's Joyjatra (2004) and Oggyatonama (2016); Rubaiyat Hossain's Meherjaan (2011) and Under Construction (2016); Kamar Ahmad Simon's Shunte Ki Pao! (Are You Listening!) (2012); Zahidur Rahim Anjan's Meghmallar (2014); Aung Rakhine's My Bicycle (2015); Bijon Imtiaz's Matir Projar Deshe-Kingdom of Clay Subjects (2016), Amitabh Reza Chowdhury's Aynabaji (2016) etc. These films won many international acclaims introducing Bangladeshi films to a wide international audiences. The late Tareque Masud is regarded as one of Bangladesh's outstanding directors due to his numerous productions on historical and social issues. Masud was honored by FIPRESCI at the Cannes Film Festival in 2002 for his film The Clay Bird (2002).

== Important figures ==
=== Directors ===
- Fateh Lohani
- Dewan Nazrul
- Khan Ataur Rahman
- Zahir Raihan
- Subhash Dutta
- Ehtesham
- Ritwik Ghatak
- Chashi Nazrul Islam
- Alamgir Kabir
- Narayan Ghosh Mita
- Azizur Rahman
- Matin Rahman
- Abdullah Al Mamun
- Syed Hasan Imam
- Kazi Hayat
- Gazi Mazharul Anwar
- Tareque Masud
- Tanvir Mokammel
- Morshedul Islam
- Abu Sayeed
- Nasiruddin Yousuff
- Humayun Ahmed
- Akhtaruzzaman
- Montazur Rahman Akbar
- Shahidul Islam Khokon
- M B Manik
- Mostofa Sarwar Farooki
- Tauquir Ahmed
- SA Haque Alik
- Shahnewaz Kakoli
- Redoan Rony
- Mohammad Mostafa Kamal Raz
- Murad Parvez
- Zahidur Rahman Anjan
- Kamar Ahmad Simon
- Rubaiyat Hossain
- Ashraf Shishir
- Iftakar Chowdhury
- Amitabh Reza Chowdhury
- Khijir Hayat Khan
- Anonno Mamun
- Taneem Rahman Angshu
- Dipankar Dipon
- Rezwan Shahriar Sumit
- Himel Ashraf
- Mejbaur Rahman Sumon
- Raihan Rafi

=== Actors ===
- Fateh Lohani
- Rahman
- Khan Ataur Rahman
- Javed Rahim (Minu mama)
- Subhash Dutta
- Anwar Hossain
- Baby Zaman
- Golam Mustafa
- ATM Shamsuzzaman
- Syed Hasan Imam
- Abdur Razzak
- Farooque
- Ujjal
- Prabir Mitra
- Alamgir
- Sohel Raana
- Amol Bose
- Bulbul Ahmed
- Zafar Iqbal
- Wasim
- Ilias Kanchan
- Jashim
- Wasimul Bari Rajib
- Humayun Faridi
- Raisul Islam Asad
- Aly Zaker
- Abul Khair
- Abul Hayat
- Asaduzzaman Noor
- Jayanta Chattopadhyay
- Shahiduzzaman Selim
- Gazi Rakayet
- Tariq Anam Khan
- Bapparaj
- Manna
- Omar Sani
- Amit Hasan
- Misha Sawdagor
- Afzal Hossain
- Nayeem
- Zahid Hasan
- Tauquir Ahmed
- Salman Shah
- Shakil Khan
- Amin Khan
- Riaz
- Azad Abul Kalam
- Fazlur Rahman Babu
- Salahuddin Lavlu
- Ahmed Rubel
- Intekhab Dinar
- Ferdous Ahmed
- Shakib Khan
- Nirab Hossain
- Challenger
- Chanchal Chowdhury
- Mosharraf Karim
- Partha Barua
- Mahfuz Ahmed
- Mamnun Hasan Emon
- Symon Sadik
- Ananta Jalil
- Arifin Shuvoo
- Bappy Chowdhury
- Ziaul Faruq Apurba
- Siam Ahmed
- Ziaul Roshan
- Sariful Razz
- Yash Rohan
- Shajal Noor
- Afran Nisho
- Shamol Mawla
- FS Nayeem

=== Actresses ===
- Sumita Devi
- Anwara Begum
- Rawshan Jamil
- Shabnam
- Kohinoor Akhter Shuchanda
- Rosy Samad
- Nusrat Faria Mazhar
- Kabori Sarwar
- Shabana
- Farida Akhter Bobita
- Dilara Zaman
- Rozina
- Doli Johur
- Parveen Sultana Diti
- Champa
- Anju Ghosh
- Moushumi
- Shabnur
- Shabnaz
- Sharmili Ahmed
- Wahida Mollick Jolly
- Bipasha Hayat
- Shila Ahmed
- Rokeya Prachy
- Purnima
- Sadika Parvin Popy
- Shimla
- Aupee Karim
- Afsana Mimi
- Joya Ahsan
- Apu Biswas
- Sahara
- Nusrat Imrose Tisha
- Rikita Nandini Shimu
- Afiea Nusrat Barsha
- Rafiath Rashid Mithila
- Aparna Ghosh
- Bidya Sinha Saha Mim
- Zakia Bari Momo
- Achol
- Bobby
- Shobnom Bubly
- Airin Sultana
- Nazifa Tushi
- Azmeri Haque Badhon
- Tama Mirza
- Sadia Ayman
- Mehazabien Chowdhury
- Sabila Nur
- Tasnia Farin

== Films ==
- 2026 -
- 2025 - 46 films
- 2024 - 49 films
- 2023 - 50 films
- 2022 - 60 films
- 2021 - 31 films
- 2020 - 10 films
- 2019 - 41 films
- 2018 - 47 films
- 2017 – 63 films
- 2016 – 58 films
- 2015 – 66 films
- 2014 – 78 films
- 2013 – 53 films
- 2012 – 51 films
- 2011 – 48 films
- 2010 – 57 films
- 2009 – 63 films
- 2008 – 67 films
- 2007 – 96 films
- 2006 – 98 films
- 2005 – 103 films
- 2004 – 88 films
- 2003 – 79 films
- 2002 – 82 films
- 2001 – 72 films
- 2000 – 99 films
- 1992 – 72 films
- 1990 – 70 films
- 1989 – 77 films
- 1988 – 65 films
- 1987 – 65 films
- 1986 – 67 films
- 1985 – 65 films
- 1984 – 53 films
- 1983 – 44 films
- 1982 – 40 films
- 1981 – 39 films
- 1980 – 47 films
- 1978 – 37 films
- 1977 – 31 films
- 1976 – 46 films
- 1975 – 34 films
- 1974 – 30 films
- 1973 – 30 films
- 1972 – 29 films
- 1971 – 8 films
- 1970 – 41 Films

== Notable films ==
=== Classics ===
- Sukumari: The good girl (1927–28)
- The Last Kiss (1931)
- The Face and the Mask (1956)
- The Day Shall Dawn (1959)
- The Sky and The Earth (1959)
- The Clay Hill (1959)
- Asiya (1960)
- Kokhono Asheni (1961)
- Seven Brothers Champak (1968)
- Jibon Theke Neya (1970)
- Ora Egaro Jon (1972)
- A River Called Titas (1973)
- Quiet Flows the river Meghna (1973)
- Chhutir Ghonta (Holiday Hours) (1980)
- Devdas (1982)
- Shuvoda (1986)
- Shonkhonil Karagar (1992)
- Aguner Poroshmoni (1994)
- Dipu Number Two (1996)
- Hangor Nodi Grenade (1997)
- Quiet Flows the River Chitra (1999)
- A Rainy Day of the Month Srabon (1999)
- Lalsalu (A Tree without roots) (2001)
- The Punishment (2004)
- Hajar Bachhor Dhore (2005)
- Shyamol Chhaya (The Green Shade) (2005)
- Shuva (2006)
- Monpura (2009)
- Meherjaan (2011)
- My Friend Rashed (2011)
- Shunte Ki Pao! (Are You Listening!) (2012)

=== Cult films ===
- The Day Shall Dawn (1959)
- Seven Brothers Champak (1968)
- Jibon Theke Neya (1970)
- 11 Warriors (1972)
- Arunodoyer Agnishakkhi (1972)
- Quiet Flows the river Meghna (1973)
- Alor Michil (1974)
- Megher Onek Rong (1976)
- Chhutir Ghonta (Holiday Hours) (1980)
- Devdas (1982)
- Boro Bhalo Lok Chhilo (1982)
- The Gypsy Girl (1989)
- Nodir Naam Modhumoti (1990)
- The Boatman on The River Padma (1992)
- Shonkhonil Karagar (1992)
- Aguner Poroshmoni (1994)
- Song of Freedom (1995)
- Dukhai (1997)
- Quiet Flows the River Chitra (1999)
- Story of Freedom (1999)
- Kittonkhola (2000)
- The Clay Bird (2002)
- Journey to Victory (2004)
- Shyamol Chhaya (The Green Shade) (2005)
- Homeland-The Inner Journey (2006)
- On the Wings of Dreams (2007)
- Monpura (2009)
- Shunte Ki Pao! (Are You Listening!) (2012)
- Live From Dhaka (2016)

=== Modern era films ===
- Dui Duari (2000)
- Lalsalu (A Tree without roots) (2001)
- The Clay Bird (2002)
- Lalon (2004)
- Journey to Victory (2004)
- Shyamol Chhaya (The Green Shade) (2005)
- Homeland-The Inner Journey (2006)
- On the Wings of Dreams (2007)
- Aha! (2007)
- Monpura (2009)
- Third Person Singular Number (2009)
- Dark Resonance (2010)
- Jaago(2010)
- Meherjaan (2011)
- Quicksand (2012)
- Lal Tip (2012)
- Shunte Ki Pao! (Are You Listening!) (2012)
- Television (2013)
- Ant Story (2014)
- Agnee (2014)
- Taarkata (2014)
- Checkmate (2014)
- Desha: The Leader (2014)
- Glow of the Firefly (2014)
- Brihonnola (2014)
- Hitman (2014)
- Gangster Returns (2015)
- Under Construction (2016)
- Angaar (2016)
- Sweetheart (2016)
- Full Length Love Story II (2016)
- Musafir (2016)
- Live from Dhaka (2016)
- Niyoti (2016)
- Samraat: The King Is Here (2016)
- Shikari (2016)
- Bossgiri (2016)
- Oggatonama (2016)
- Aynabaji (2016)
- Bhuban Majhi (2016)
- Premi O Premi (2017)
- Nabab (2017)
- Dhaka Attack (2017)
- No Bed of Roses (2017)
- Debi (2018)
- Password (2019)
- Nolok (2019)
- Iti, Tomari Dhaka (2019)
- No Dorai (2019)
- Bir (2020)
- Mission Extreme (2021)
- Mridha Bonam Mridha (2021)
- Paap Punno (2022)
- Operation Sundarbans (2022)
- Damal (2022)
- Daag (2022)
- Black War: Mission Extreme 2 (2023)
- Leader: Amie Bangladesh (2023)
- Priyotoma (2023)
- Surongo (2023)
- Rajkumar (2024)
- Toofan (2024)
- Dard (2024)
- Borbaad (2025)
- Taandob (2025)

=== Commercial successes ===
- The Face and the Mask (1956)
- The Day Shall Dawn (1959)
- The Sky and The Earth (1959)
- The Clay Hill (1959)
- Seven Brothers Champak (1968)
- Story of Life (1970)
- 11 Warriors (1972)
- A River Called Titas (1973)
- Quiet Flows the river Meghna (1973)
- Chhutir Ghonta (Holiday Hours) (1980)
- Devdas (1982)
- The Gypsy Girl (1989)
- Aguner Poroshmoni (1994)
- Dipu Number Two (1996)
- Coolie (1997)
- Shanto Keno Mastan (1998)
- Kukkhato Khuni (2000)
- Monpura (2009)
- Number One Shakib Khan (2010)
- Most Welcome (2012)
- PoraMon (2013)
- My Name Is Khan (2013)
- Nishwartha Bhalobasa (2013)
- Full Length Love Story (2013)
- The Kingdom (2014)
- Agnee (2014)
- Hero: The Superstar (2014)
- Most Welcome 2 (2014)
- Hitman (2014)
- Checkmate(2014)
- Romeo vs Juliet (2015)
- Chuye Dile Mon (2015)
- Full Length Love Story II (2016)
- Musafir (2016)
- Samraat: The King Is Here (2016)
- Shikari (2016)
- Mental (2016)
- Bossgiri (2016)
- Aynabaji (2016)
- Nabab (2017)
- Dhaka Attack (2017)
- Jannat (2018)
- Password (2019)
- Nolok (2019)
- Hawa (2022)
- Poran (2022)
- Damal (2022)
- Leader: Amie Bangladesh (2023)
- Priyotoma (2023)
- Surongo (2023)
- Rajkumar (2024)
- Toofan (2024)
- Borbaad (2025)
- Daagi (2025)
- Taandob (2025)

== Major events ==
=== Festivals ===
- Dhaka International Film Festival
- Bangladesh Short Film Forum
- International Short and Independent Film Festival
- International Children's Film Festival

=== Awards ===
- Bachsas Film Awards – since 1972
- National Film Awards – since 1975
- Meril Prothom Alo Awards – since 1998
- Babisas Award – since 2004
- Ifad Film Club Award – since 2012
- Lux Channel I Performance Award
- Green Bangla Binodon Bichitra Performance Award

== Film education ==
- Bangladesh Cinema and Television Institute - Bangladesh Film And Television Institute
- International Academy of Film and Media (IAFM), partner of the event International Student Award organised by UniFrance
- Department of Film and Television (under Jagannath University)
- Television and Film Studies (under University of Dhaka)
- Graphics Design & Multimedia, BA (Hons.) Shanto-Mariam University of Creative Technology (SMUCT)
- Film and Media Studies, BA (Hons.), Film and Media Studies, MA (under Stamford University Bangladesh)
- Multimedia & Creative Technology (under Daffodil International University)
- Department of Film, Television and Digital Media (FTDM) (under Green University of Bangladesh)
- Department of Media and Communication (under Independent University, Bangladesh)
- Bangladesh Film Institute (past) and Bangladesh Film Institute (present)
- Moviyana Film Society
- Bangladesh Film and Television Academy
- Pathshala Cinema Department
- Bangladesh Film School

== See also ==
- List of Bangladeshi films
- List of highest grossing Bangladeshi films
- List of Bangladeshi film series
- Independent films of Bangladesh
- List of Bangladeshi submissions for the Academy Award for Best Foreign Language Film
- STAR Cineplex
- Blockbuster Cinemas
- Lion Cinemas
- Azad Cinema
- Modhumita Cinema
- Modhubon Cinema
- Shyamoli Cinema
- Monihar Cinema
- CineScope
