= List of Bangladeshi films =

This is a list of films produced by the Dhallywood film industry of Dhaka, Bangladesh, ordered by year of release. Dhallywood films are generally listed under the Bengali language. Some films before 1971 mixed Urdu and Bengali language.

== 20th century ==
=== Before 1960 ===
- List of Dhallywood films before 1960

=== 1960–1999 ===
- 1960
- 1961
- 1962
- 1963
- 1964
- 1965
- 1966
- 1967
- 1968
- 1969
- 1970
- 1971
- 1972
- 1973
- 1974
- 1975
- 1976
- 1977
- 1978
- 1979
- 1980
- 1981
- 1982
- 1983
- 1984
- 1985
- 1986
- 1987
- 1988
- 1989
- 1990
- 1991
- 1992
- 1993
- 1994
- 1995
- 1996
- 1997
- 1998
- 1999

== 21st century ==
- 2000
- 2001
- 2002
- 2003
- 2004
- 2005
- 2006
- 2007
- 2008
- 2009
- 2010
- 2011
- 2012
- 2013
- 2014
- 2015
- 2016
- 2017
- 2018
- 2019
- 2020
- 2021
- 2022
- 2023
- 2024
- 2025
- 2026

== See also ==
- List of highest grossing Bangladeshi films
- List of Bangladeshi film series
- Independent films of Bangladesh
- Bangladesh National Film Award for Best Film
- List of Bangladeshi submissions for the Academy Award for Best Foreign Language Film
