= List of Dhallywood films of 1965 =

The Dhallywood film industry released 11 feature films in 1965. (Note: Although Shikdar dates Bandhan to 1965, Gazdar dates it to 1964.)

Title	Director	Starring	Language	Ref.
Bahana	Zahir Raihan	Kabori, Rahman, Garaj Babu	Urdu	
Godhulir Prem	Mohiuddin	Chitra Sinha, Amin, Anwer Hussain	Bengali	
Janajani	Ali Mansur	Hasan Imam, Sultana Zaman, Shawkat Akbar, Anwera, Anwar	Bengali	
Kaise Kahun	Sadek Khan	Shabnam, Khalil, Subhash Dutta, Golam Mustafa	Urdu	
Kajal	Nazrul Islam		Urdu	
Mala	Mustafiz	Sultana Zaman, Azim, Irfan, Akbar	Urdu	
Nadi-o-Nari	Sadek Khan	Rawshan Ara, Masud, Kazi Khalek, Subhash Dutta	Bengali	
Rupban	Salahuddin	Hasan Imam, Sujata, Chandana, Sirajul Islam, Anwar, Subhash Dutta	Bengali/Urdu	
Sagar	Ehtesham	Shabnam, Azim, Tarana, Subhash Dutta, Inam	Urdu	
Sat Rang	Fateh Lohani	Sultana Zaman, Haroon, Kazi Khalek	Urdu	
Ujala	Kamal Ahmed	Sultana Zaman, Hasan Imam, Nasima Khan	Urdu	(Note: Gazdar dates Ujala to 1966, but Kabir and Shikdar date it to 1965.)
Aakhri Station	Suroor Barabankvi	Rani, Haroon, Shabnam, Subhash Dutta, Shawkat Akbar	Urdu	(Note: Gazdar dates Aakhri Station to 1965, but Kabir, Raju, and Shikdar, date it to 1966.)

== See also ==
- 1965 in Pakistan

== Notes ==
There are numerous minor inconsistencies in transliteration among the sources. Greater discrepancies are as follows:
