= List of Dhallywood films of 1968 =

A list of Bangladeshi films released in 1968.

== Released films ==
Film	Director	Cast	Genre	Note	References
Dui Bhai	Nurul Haque Amjad Hossain Rahim Newaz Mustafa	Suchonda, Nasima Khan, Razzak, Fath Lohani, Javed Rahim, Baby Zaman, Amjad Hossain, Dilip Biswas, Aruna, Sabita, Rizia Chowdhury, Noor Mohamed Charlie, Badruddin			
Soye Nodia Jage Pani	Khan Ataur Rahman	Hasan Imam, Kabri, Roji Afsari, Raj, Narayan Chakraborty, Jalil Afghani		Urdu language film	
Madhu Mala	Azizur Rahman	Azim, Sujata, Sultana Zaman, Anis			
Rakhal Bandhu	Ibne Mizan	Azim, Sujata, Suochanda, Anwar Hossain, Inam Ahmed and Inam Ahmed			
Nishi Holo Vor	Noor A Alam	Razzak, Suchonda, Sirajul Islam			
Sangshar	Nurul Haque Rahim Newaz Mustafa	Razzak, Suochanda, Babita, Sajjad, Amjad Hossain, Rubina, Baby Zaman, Sultana, Moon expatriates		Babita played the role of "Subarna" in the film.	
Jongli Ful	Shahjahan	Shawkat Akbar, Suochanda, Khalil, Sultana Zaman			
Saat Bhai Champa	Dilip Shom	Kabri, Azim, Raj, Atiya, Khan Ataur Rahman			
Abirbhab	Subhash Dutt	Razzak, Azim, Sharmila Ahmed, Subhash Dutta, Kabri, Narayan Chakraborty			
Chand aur Chandni	Ehtesham	Shabana, Nadeem, Reshma, Golam Mustafa		Urdu language film	
Tum Mere Ho	Surur Barar Bangvi	Nadeem, Shabana, Shabnam, Anwar Hossain		Urdu language film	
Natun Diganta	Nazir Ahmed	Rahman, Sultana Zaman, Shabnam, Anis, Kazi Khalek, Golam Mustafa			
Sakhina	Karigor	Razzak, Suchonda, Anwara, Khan Zainul, Kazi Khalek			
Gori	Mohsin	Rahman, Nasima Khan, Golam Mustafa		Urdu language film	
Bashori	Abdul Jabbar Khan	Kobori, Anwara			
Rup Kumari	Kamal Ahmed	Rupa Kumari, Mannan, Ashish Kumar, Sultana Zaman, Anis, Narayan Chakraborty			
Chena Ochena	E. R. Khan Mama	Azim, Sujata, Roji Afsari, Anwar Hossain, Narayan Chakrabarti			
Bhaggo Chokro	MA Hamid	Shabana, Hasan Imam, Sultana Zaman, Sumita Devi, Sirajul Islam			
Etotuku Asha	Narayan Chandra Ghosh	Sujata, Rozi, Kazi Khalek, Razzak, Hasmat, Fateh Lohani, Saifuddin			
Suyorani Duyorani	Rahim Newaz	Suchanda, Razzak, Baby Zaman			
Ballobandhu	Amjad Hossain	Mahmood, Sanchita, Sumita Devi, Qazi Khalek, Fateh Lohani			
Parashmani	Zaheer Chowdhury	Anwar Hossain, Suochanda, Mannan, Fateh Lohani, Saifuddin			
Coolie	Mustafiz	Shabana, Nadeem, Sujata, Azim, Nina, Jamil Afghani			
Shaheed Titumir	Ibn Mizan	Azim, Sujata, Golam Mustafa, Sabita, Anwar Hossain, Narayan Chakraborty			
Kuchabaran Kanya	Nurul Haque Bachchu	Razzak, Succanda, Sukanta, Samad, Baby Zaman			
Sapto Dinga		Sirajul Islam			
Arun Varun Kiranmala	Khan Ataur Rahman	Atiya, Kabri, Azim, Khan Ataur Rahman			
Champa Koli	Safdar Ali Bhuiyan	Papia, Mannan, Samina			
Shit Basonto	Shibli Sadik Azim, Kabri, Rani Sarkar, Inam Ahmed				
Jaha Beje Shahnai	Rahman	Rahman, Rubina, Suochanda, Anwar Hossain, Sirajul Islam, Arshad Imam		Urdu language film	
Chorabali	Udayan Chowdhury	Ehsaan, Razzak, Kobori, Rozi Afsari, Shawkat Akbar, Sabita			
Oporichita	Syed Awal	Sumita Devi, Mannan, Poetry, Anis, Sujata, Narayan Chakraborty			
Momer Alo	Mustafa Mehmood	Sarker Kabir, Khalil, Sujata, Sumita Devi, Fateh Lohani, Sirajul Islam, Natun, Golam Mustafa			
Rupbaner Rupkatha	E.R. Khan	Mannan, Azim, Sujata, Rubina, Anwara, Narayan Chakraborty, Anis			

== See also ==
- 1968 in Bangladesh
- List of Bangladeshi films
