= List of Dhallywood films of 1966 =

The Dhallywood film industry released 24 feature films in 1966. (Note: Gazdar and Kabir date Zarina Sundari to 1966, but Shikdar doesn't list it.)

Title	Director	Starring	Language	Ref.
13 Feku Ostagar Lane	Bashir Hossain	Sumita Devi, Siraj, Kamal, Anwara, Sujata, Waheeda Rahman	Bengali	(Note: Gazdar names Bashir Ahmad as the director of 13 Feku Ostagar Lane, but Kabir credits "Bashir Hossain", which corresponds with the Bangladesh Film Archive.)
Abar Bonobashe Roopban	Ibne Mizan	Hasan Imam, Sultana Zaman, Chandana, Ratna, Kazi Khalek	Bengali	
Apan Dulal	Nazrul Islam	Nasima, Azim, Shawkat Akbar, Ashish Kumar, F. Mohsin	Bengali	
Begana	S. M. Parvez	Shabnam, Khalil, Nasima Khan, Golam Mustafa	Urdu	
Behula	Zahir Raihan	Suchanda, Razzak, Nasima, Rani Sarker, Fateh Lohani	Bengali	
Bhaiya	Kazi Zahir	Chitra Sinha, Waheed Murad, Shawkat Akbar, Anwer Hussain	Urdu	
Bhawal Sanyasi	Rounaq Chowdhury	Shawkat Akbar, Reshma, Kazi Khalek, Rani Sarkar, Khalil, N. Inam	Bengali	
Dak Babu	Mustafiz	Sujata, Azim, Ratna, Shabana, Dipti, Rano, Manzur	Bengali or Urdu	(Note: Gazdar says Dak Babu was a Bengali-language film, but Kabir writes that it was in Urdu.)
Ghar Ki Laaj	S. M. Selim	Attiya, Naushad, Waris, Afshan	Urdu	(Note: Although Gazdar doesn't list Ghar Ki Laaj as a film made in East Pakistan, Kabir and Shikdar do.)
Gunai	Bazlur Rahman	Chandana, Ranjana, Manaan, Mehmud	Bengali	(Note: Gazdar names F. Rahman as the director of Gunai, but Kabir credits "Bazlur Rahman", which corresponds with Shikdar.)
Gunai Bibi	Syed Awal	Dilruba, Shawkat Akbar, Muslehudin, Anuradha, Kalidas	Bengali	
Indhan	Rahman	Rahman, Reshma, Golam Mustafa	Urdu	
Is Dharti Par	Nurul Alam	Rosy, Haroon, Farida, Mirza, Khalil	Urdu	(Note: Gazdar dates Is Dharti Par to 1967, but Kabir and Shikdar date it to 1966. Shikdar names Fakhrul Alam as the director, but Gazdar and Kabir credit Nurul Alam.)
Kar Bou	Nazrul Islam	Haroon, Nasima Khan, Khalil, Golam Mustafa, Reshma, Anwara, Dita	Bengali	
Kagojer Nouka	Subhash Dutta	Suchanda, Shawkat Akbar, Hasan Imam, Narayan	Bengali	
Mahua	Ali Mansur	Chandana, Shawkat Akbar	Bengali	
Parwana	Kamal Ahmed	Nasima Khan, Hasan Imam, Sujata	Urdu	(Note: Kabir dates what he transliterates as Perwana to 1968, but Gazdar and Shikdar date Parawna to 1966.)
Phir Milengey Hum Dono	Syed Shamsul Haq	Nazneen, Golam Mustafa, Subhash Dutta, Anwera	Urdu	
Poonam Ki Raat	Khalil Ahmed	Rosy, Shawkat Akbar, Mehfouz, Sadhana	Urdu	
Rahim Badshah O Rupban	Zahir Raihan, Safdar Ali Bhuiyan	Sujata, Mohammad Zakaria, Z. Choudhry, Misbah, Zarina, Mannan	Bengali	
Raja Sannyasi	Khan Ataur Rahman	Azim, Sujata, Samad, Anwar	Bengali	
Son of Pakistan	Fazlul Huq	Faridur Reza Sagar, Keka Ferdousi	Urdu	
Zarina Sundari	Ibne Mizan	Sujata, Mannan, Suchanda, Anis, Ruma, S. Irani, Sajad	Bengali	

== See also ==
- 1966 in Pakistan

== Notes ==
There are numerous minor inconsistencies in transliteration among the sources. Greater discrepancies are as follows:
