= List of Dhallywood films of 1967 =

A list of Dhallywood films released in 1967.

== Released films ==
Film	Director	Cast	Genre	Note	References
Chakori	Ehtesham	Nadeem, Shabana, Reshma, Mushtaq, Golam Mustafa			
Nawab Siraj Uddoulla	Khan Ataur Rahman	Anwar Hossain, Anwara, Khan Ataur Rahman, Atiya Chowdhury, Badruddin, Tandra Islam, MA Khalek	Historical	Nominated for the Golden Prize as the best film at Moscow International Film Festival	
Aporajeo	M.A. Hamid	Razzak, Sumita Devi, Aminul Haque, Sujata, Anwar Hossain, Sirajul Islam			
Abishap	Rashed Azgar Chowdhury	Shawkat Akbar, Sultana Zaman, Sumita Devi, Saifuddin			
Agun Niye Khela	Nurul Haque and Amjad Hossain	Sujata, Razzak, Baby Zaman, Shawkat Akbar, Altaf, Sumita Devi, Fateh Lohani			
Mayurponkhi	Habib Mehdi	Syed Hasan Imam, Sultana Zaman, Inam Ahmed, Rozina, Mannan, Saifuddin			
Hiramon	Rashed Ajgar Chowdhury	Kabri, Shawkat Akbar, Anwara, Sirajul Islam, Jayashree, Sadek Nabi			
Ayna O Oboshisto	Subhas Dutt	Azim, Sujata, Sabita, Masud Ali Khan, Suochanda		Privately rewarded at the Moscow International Film Festival	
Jongli Meye	Ibn Mizan	Shabana, Azim, Shams Iranian, Sajjad, Amini			
Anwara	Zaheer Raihan	Suchanda, Anwara, Razzak, Chand Mia, Noor Islam, Baby Zaman, Rubina, Rani Sarkar, Amiruddin, Amjad Hossain			
Kanchan Mala	Safdar Ali Bhuiyan				
Chaoya Paowa	Narayan Ghosh Mita	Razzak, Kabori, Rozi Afsari, Suchanda, Anwara, Golam Mustafa, Anwar Hossain, Narayan Chakraborty, Kazi Khalek, Saifuddin			
Saiful Mulok Badiujjaman	Azizur Rahman	Azim, Sujata, Rani Sarkar, Khalil, Papia			
Ali Baba	Nazrul Islam	Ashish Kumar, Sujata, Sumita Devi, Sirajul Islam, Inam Ahmed			
Pora	Kazi Zaheer				
Julekha	Amjad Hossain	Suchanda, Razzak, Rubina, Sabita, Javed Rahim, Baby Zaman, Fateh Lohani			
Uljhon	Azahar Hossain	Hasan Imam, Rozi Afsari, Khalil, Nasima Khan, Sirajul Islam, Azim			
Zina Ve Muskil	Taher Chowdhury	Sirajul Islam			
Darshan	Rahman	Shabnam, Rahman, Mehfuz, Rumana, Fateh Lohani, Garuj Babu, Reshma			
Choto Saheb	Mustafiz	Nadeem, Shabana, Azim, Sujata, Narayan Chakraborty, Golam Mustafa			
Main Vi Insan Hoon	Nasir Khan	Mehmood, Sujata, Nasima Khan, Shams Irani			
Bala	Awlad Hossain Shibli Sadik				
Nayon Tera	Kazi Zaheer	Azim, Succanda, Ashish Kumar Iron, Kazi Khalek, Reshma			
Hamdam	Nurul Haque				

== See also ==
- 1967 in Pakistan
