= List of Dhallywood films of 1962 =

The Dhallywood film industry released six feature films in 1962. (Note: Although Gazdar lists Azaan as a Bengali film made in East Pakistan in 1962, neither Kabir nor Shikdar include it or the director.)

| Title | Director | Starring | Language | Ref. |
|---|---|---|---|---|
| Azaan | Fazal Haq | Azim, Chitra Sinha, Rahman, Shabnam, Rani Sarker | Bengali | |
| Chanda | Ehtesham | Sultana Zaman, Shabnam, Rahman, Subhash Dutta | Urdu | |
| Joar Elo | Abdul Jabbar Khan | Sultana Zaman, Saifuddin, Anwar Hossain, Rosy | Bengali | |
| Natun Sur | Ehtesham | Rahman, Rawshan Ara, Azim, Nurealam, Subhash Dutta | Bengali | |
| Sonar Kajol | Zahir Raihan, Kalim Sharafi | Khalil, Sumita Devi, Sultana Zaman, Kazi Khalek | Bengali | (Note: Neither Kabir nor Gazdar mention Sharafi, but present-day news articles credit him as co-director.) |
| Surja Snan | Salahuddin | Nasima Khan, Anwer, Rawshan Ara, Subhash Dutta, Nina | Bengali | (Note: Gazdar dates the film he transliterates as Suraj Ashnan to 1961, but Kabir, Raju, and Shikdar, date it to 1962.) |

== See also ==
- 1962 in Pakistan

== Notes ==
There are numerous minor inconsistencies in transliteration among the sources. Greater discrepancies are as follows:
