= List of Bangladeshi films of 1970 =

A list of Dhallywood films released in 1970.

== Released films ==
Film	Director	Cast	Note	References
Je Agune Puri	Amir Hossain	Razzak, Shuchanda, Kabori Sarwar, Anwar, Rosy Afsari		
Surjo Othar Age	Nazmul Huda Pintu	Azim, Sujata, Kazi Khalek, Roji Afsari, Asad, Altaf, Sumita Devi, Ahsan, Narayan Chakraborty		
Antorongo	Syed Awal	Rahman, Succanda, Khan Zainul, Altaf, Fateh Lohani		
Misor Kumari	Karigor	Azim, Sultana Zaman, Shamim Ara, Fateh Lohani, Khan Zainul, Golam Mustafa		
Ek Jalil Ek Hasina	Karigor	Shamim Ara, Fateh Lohani, Azad Khan	Urdu	
Koto Je Minoti	Ibn Mizan	Sarker Kabir, Razzak, Abed Ali, Anwar Hossain, Kabori		
Sontan	U. R. Khan Mama	Azim, Kabori, Sabita, Golam Mustafa, Khan Zainul, Narayan Chakraborty		
Samapti	Manzur Hossain	Razzak, Shabana, Baby Zaman, Raj, Khalil, Waheeda, Saifuddin		
Payel	Mustafiz	Razzak, Shabana, Javed Rahim, Sultana, Anis	Urdu	
Tansel	Rafiqul Bari Chowdhury	Azim, Sujata, Khalil, Baby Jaman, Fateh Lohani, Narayan Chakraborty		
Ka Kha Ga Gha Umo	Narayan Ghosh Mita	Razzak, Kabori Sarwar, Rozi Afsari, Tandra, Anwar Hossain, Hasmat		
Adorsho Chapakhana	Mustafiz	Ansar, Nutan, Sujata, Ashish Kumar Liiho, Khan Zainul, Sumita Devi		
Meena	Kazi Zahir	Razzak, Kabori Sarwar, Anwar Hossain, Sirajul Islam	Urdu	
Amir Saudagar and Valua Sundari	Ibn Mizan	Azim, Sujata		
Akabaka	Babul Chowdhury	Razzak, Kabori Sarwar, Sultana Zaman, Anwar Hossain, Fateh Lohani, Altaf, Saifuddin Babul Chowdhury		
Nayika	Ismail Mohammad	Azim, Kori, Anwar Hossain, Raushan Jamil, Shawkat Akbar, Khan Zainul, Altaf		
Jibon Theke Neya	Zaheer Raihan	Razzak, Suochanda, Roji Afsari, Shawkat Akbar, Anwar Hossain, Baby Zaman		
Pich Dhala Poth	Ehtesham	Razzak, Babita, Jalil Afghani, Maya Hazika, Anis, Narayan Chakraborty		
Jog Biyog	Nurul Haque Bachchu	Razzak, Suochanda, Anwar Hossain, Golam Mustafa		
Darpochurno	Nazrul Islam	Razzak, Kobori, Anwara, Fateh Lohani, Khan Zainul		
Choddobeshi	Q.M. Zaman	Razzak, Shabana, Altaf, Sirajul Islam, Anwar Hossain		
Sorolipi	Nazrul Islam	Razzak, Babita, Anwara, Sultana Zaman, Inam Ahmed, Fateh Lohani, Ashish Kumar Iron, Anwar Hossain		
Manush Omanush	Fakhrul Alam	Amjad Hossain, Sumita Devi, Keramot Mawla		
Binimoy	Subhas Dutta	Bright, Subhash Dutta, Anwar Hossain, Golam Mustafa, Kabri		
Rong Bodlay	Akbar Kabir Pintu	Khalil, Azim, Sujata, Golam Mustafa, Nasima Khan, Kabori		
Bablu	Mustafiz	Azim, Javed Rahim, Shabana, Suchratita, Raj, Narayan Chakraborty		
Madhu Milon	Kazi Zaheer	Razzak, Shabana, Suchanda, Anwara, Sultana Zaman, Khan Zainul, Saifuddin		
Ahdikar	Kamal Ahmad	Razzak, Roji Afsari, Kabori, Anwar Hossain, Kabita		
Deuyer Pore Deheu	Mohsin	Razzak, Kobori, Anwar Hossain, Hashmat, Nasima Khan, Khan Zainul		
Apon Por	Bashir Hossain	Zafar Iqbal, Kobori, Kobita, Sajjad, Narayan Chakraborty, Khan Ataur Rahman		
Pita Putro	Amjad Hossain	Razzak, Kobori, Amjad Hossain, Supriya, Fateh Lohani		
Rajmukut	Safdar Ali Bhuiyan	Anwar Hossain, Samina, Sabita, Sumita Devi, Rabiul		
Cholo Man Gaye	Rahman	Rahman, Shabnam, Shawkat Akbar, Jalil Afghani, Subhash Dutt	Urdu	
Ghurnijhar	Asad	Imrul Kayes, Golam Mustafa, Sujata, Rozi Afsari, Fateh Lohani, Anwara, Kori		
Taka Ana Pai	Babul Chowdhury	Razzak, Babita, Anwar Hossain, Inam Ahmed, Shawkat Akbar, Baby Zaman, Altaf, Golam Mustafa		
Natun Provat	Mustafa Mehmood	Ashish Kumar, Natun, Khasru, Ansar, Rani Sarkar, Sumita Devi, Sirajul Islam		
Kothay Jeno Dekhechi	Nizamul Haque	Anwar Hossain, Suochanda		
Kaskata Hire	Abdul Jabbar Khan	Razzak, Kobori, Rozi Afsari, Abdul Jabbar Khan, Khan Zainul		
Deep Neve Nai	Narayan Ghosh Mita	Kabori, Rozi Afsari, Anwar Hossain, Fateh Lohani, Altaf, Khan Zainul, Razzak		
Ekoi Onge Eto Rup	Mustafiz	Zafar Iqbal, Shabana, Kobori, Narayan Chakraborty, Inam Ahmed, Golam Mustafa		
Boro Bou	Nurul Haque	Sujata, Rozi Afsari, Baby Zaman, Shawkat Akbar, Razzak		
Monimala	Dilip Shom			
Bindu Theke Britto	Rebecca	Atiya, Mofiz, Rebecca, Shahid Ashraf, Fakhrul Alam		

== See also ==
- List of Dhallywood films of 1969
- List of Bangladeshi films of 1971
