= List of Dhallywood films of 1963 =

The Dhallywood film industry--the film industry based in Dhaka, Bangladesh--released four feature films in 1963. (Note: Gazdar and Hayat date Kancher Deyal to 1963, but Kabir, Raju, and Shikdar, date it to 1964.)

Title	Director	Starring	Language	Ref.
Dharapat	Salahuddin	Nasima Khan, Amjad Hossain, Sujata	Bengali	
Nach Ghar	Abdul Jabbar Khan	Shabnam, Golam Mustafa, Nasima Khan	Urdu	
Preet Na Jane Reet	Masud Chaudhury	Shabnam, Khalil, Golam Mustafa, Surraiya	Urdu	
Talash	Mustafiz	Shabnam, Rahman, Shawkat Akbar, Rani Sarker, Subhash Dutta	Urdu	(Note: Kabir dates Talash to 1964, but Gazdar, Hoek, and Shikdar, date it to 1963.)

== See also ==
- 1963 in Pakistan

== Notes ==
There are numerous minor inconsistencies in transliteration among the sources. Greater discrepancies are as follows:
