= List of Dhallywood films of 1969 =

A list of Dhallywood films released in 1969.

== Released films ==
Film	Film	Cast	Genre	Note	References
Paruler Sangshar	Sirajul Islam Bhuiyan	Azim, Kabori, Anwar Hossain, Atiya, Raj			
Gazi Kal Champabati	Mohiuddin	Hasan Imam, Sujata, Sabita, Anwar Hossain, Saifuddin			
Piasha	Nazrul Islam	Rahman, Succanda, Azim, Anwara, Ashish Kumar		Urdu language film	
Pala Bodol	Subhash Dutta	Subhash Dutt, Pallabi, Supriya, Anwar Hossain, Rahima Khala			
Natun Namer Dako	Mumtaz Ali	Sarkar Kabir, Anis, Suochanda, Baby Zaman			
Patalprir Rajkannna	Ibn Mizan	Azim, Sujata, Mannan, Chandana, Inam Ahmed			
Moner Moto Bou	Rahim Newaz	Razzak, Succanda, Sultana Zaman, Baby Zaman, Khan Ataur Rahman			
Protikar	Babu Lal	Imrul Kayes, Kobori, Rozi Afsari			
Alomoti	Salahuddin	Hasan Imam, Samina, Sirajul Islam, Anwar Hossain			
Moyna Moti	Kazi Zaheer	Razzak, Kabori, Sujata, Azim, Hasmat, Saifuddin, Inam Ahmed, Khan Zainul			
Daag	Ehtesham	Nadeem, Shabana, Jalil Afghani		Urdu language film	
Beder Meye	Nurul Haque	Azim, Rozi Afsari, Narayan Chakraborty, Sujata, Baby Zaman			
Obanchito	Kamal Ahmed	Azim, Sujata, Roji Afsari, Kazi Khalek, Anwar Hossain, Narayan Chakraborty			
Kongon	Rahman	Rahman, Atiya, Sangita, Altaf, Anwar Hossain		Urdu language film	
Alor Pipasa	Shawkat Akbar	Rozi Afsari, Rafsan, Ashish Kumar Laoh, Altaf, Manjushri, Kazi Khalek, Anwar Hossain, Shawkat Akbar			
Anari	Mustafiz	Nadeem, Shabana, Golam Mustafa, Jalil Afghani		Urdu language film	
Agontuk	Babul Chowdhury	Razzak, Kabri, Narayan Chakraborty, Raushan Jamil, Misbahuddin, Baby Zaman			
Sesh Porjonto	Nurul Haque	Razzak, Babita, Golam Mustafa, Ranu, Baby Zaman, Narayan Chakrabarti			
Mayar Sangshar	Mostafa Mehmood	Sumita Devi, Ashish Kumar Iron, Ansar, Fateh Lohani, Sujata, Shawkat Akbar, Altaf			
Shornokomol	Nazrul Islam	Azim, Sujata, Anwar Hossain, Anwara, Ashish Kumar			
Naginir Prem	Ibn Mizan	Azim, Sujata, Anwara, Sabita, Aleya, Anwar Hossain			
Mere Arman Mere Shopne	Azizur Rahman	Azim, Sujata, Anis, Raj, Narayan Chakraborty		Urdu language film	
Alingon	Subhash Dutt	Anwar Hossain, Mandira, Subhash Dutta, Sharmili Ahmed			
Joar Bhata	Khan Ataur Rahman	Rahman, Roji Afsari, Shabnam, Khan Ataur Rahman, Inam Ahmed, Golam Mustafa			
Nil Akasher Niche	Narayan Ghosh Mita	Razzak, Kabori, Babita, Anwar Hossain, Saifuddin, Rozi Afsari, Altaf Sultana, Khan Zainul, Inam Ahmed, Narayan Chakraborty			
Mukti	Fayez Chowdhury	Sajjad, Shabana			
Vanumoti	QM Jaman	Azim, Sultana Zaman, Anwara, Hasan Imam, Anwar Hossain			
Padmo Nadir Majhi	Alamgir Kumkum	Azim, Sujata, Kobori, Anis, Khalil, Khan Zainul, Narayan Chakraborty			
Meherban	Kazi Zaheer	Razzak, Kabori, Azim, Sujata, Hasmat		Urdu language film	
Natun Fuler Gondho	Mumtaz Ali	Sarker Kabir, Anwar Hossain, Kori, Anwara, Golam Mustafa			
Molua	Falguni Group	Mannan, Poetry, Rani Sarkar, Rahima, Fateh Lohani, Anwar Hossain			

== See also ==
- 1969 in Pakistan
