= List of Bangladeshi films of 1985 =

A list of Bangladeshi films released in 1985.

== Releases ==
Title	Director	Cast	Genre	Release dateDate	Notes	Ref.
Teen Kanna	Shibli Sadiq	Babita, Suchanda, Champa, Sohel Rana, Ilias Kanchan, Prabir Mitra			The debut film of Champa. Biggest blockbuster of 1985. National Award-winning film.	
Miss Lalita	Zillur Rahman	Rozina, Wasim				
Ma o Chhele	Kamal Ahmed	Shabana, Alamgir				
Ramer Sumati	Shahidul Amin	Bobita, Prabir Mitra, Joy				
Suruj Mia	Kajal Arefin	Tariq Anam Khan, Rozina, Subarna Mustafa, Raisul Islam Asad				
Premik	Moinul Hossain	Bobita, Zafar Iqbal				
Miss Lanka	Iqbal Akhter, Ziauddin Aslam	Bobita, Zafar Iqbal, Faisal			A Bangladesh-Pakistan joint venture fim	
Mahanayak	Alamgir Kabir	Bubul Ahmed				
Saheb	Narayan Ghosh Mita	Faruque, Rozina, Tarana Halim				
Subho Ratri	CB Zaman					
Obichar	Shakti Samant	Mithun, Rozina, Nutan, Utpal Dutt			A Bangladesh-India joint venture film	
Rangin Rupban	Zillur Rahman	Rozina, Sattar				
Sohel Rana	Masud Parves	Sohel Rana, Bobita				

== See also ==
- 1985 in Bangladesh
- List of Bangladeshi films of 1986
- List of Bangladeshi films
- Cinema of Bangladesh
