= Chakma cinema =

Chakma language film industry

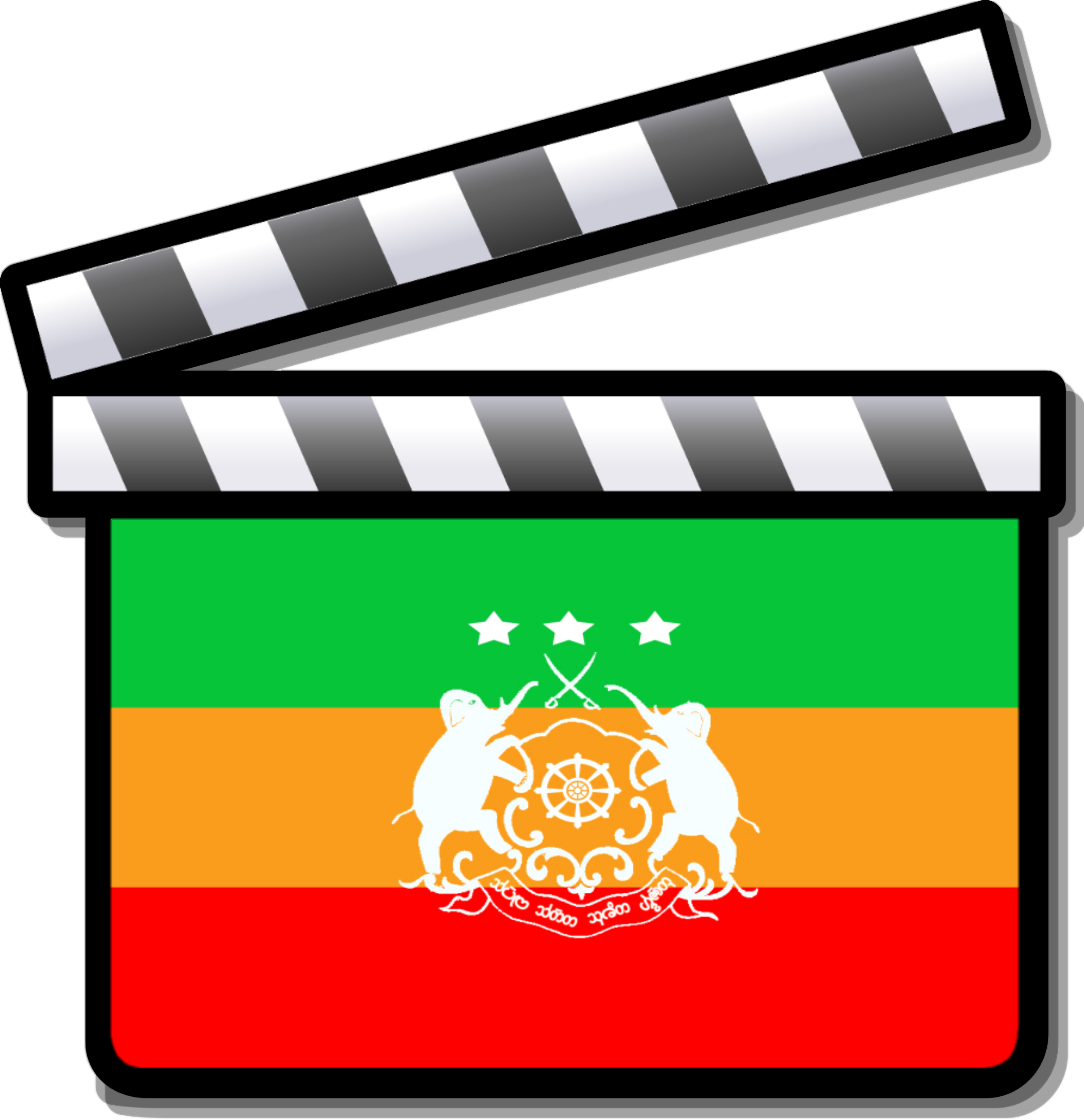
- Main distributors: Eruk Films; Laavs Digital Industries Pvt Ltd; Laavs Media

Chakma cinema, often known as Chakwood and formerly known as Chakma film, is the Chakma language film industry based in Tripura, Mizoram, Arunachal Pradesh, Bangladesh and Myanmar. The first Chakma film, Tanyabi Firti (Tanyabi's Lake), directed by Satarupa Sanyal was released on 19 July 2005. Tanyabi's Lake is the first Video film to have a commercial screening at a theatre. As the production of video films gained momentum, the Chakma film industry got expanded and around 3-10 films are made each year. Mor Thengari is the first Bangladeshi Chakma language film telling a story for the first time in an indigenous language in Bangladesh.

== Notable Chakma films ==
Year of release	Film	Notes	Director	Type
2005	Tanyabi's Lake	Be it a Chakma girl's failed love story in Satarupa Sanyal's 'Tanyabi Lake' or the complex tale of relationships in Ahsan Majid's Monpa language movie 'Sonam', rare language films, quite unassumingly, are touching the right chords at the 23rd Kolkata International Film Festival (KIFF) and Bengaluru International Film Festival	Satarupa Sanyal	Feature
2015	Mor Thengari	Best Screenplay, Ufa Silver Akbuzat Ethnic Cinema Festival 2016, Russia. Honorable Mention, Cine Kurumin - Int. Indigenous Film Festival 2016, Brazil. Tallinn Black Nights Film Festival 2015, Estonia. Göteborg Film Festival 2016, Sweden. Zanzibar International Film Festival 2016, Tanzania. 17th Asiatica Mediale Film Festival, Rome 2016. 15th Winnipeg Aboriginal Film festival 2016. Skabmagovat Film Festival, Finland 2016. Zanzibar International Film Festival, 2016. Kasa Asia Film Festival, Span 2016. Phnom Pehn International Film Festival, Combodia 2016. Bare Bones International Film and Music Festival, USA 2017.	Aung Rakhine	Feature

== See also ==
- Cinema of Bangladesh
- Chakma people
