= Bengali films of the 1940s =

Bengali films of the 1940s could refer to:

- List of Bangladeshi films#1940s
- Lists of Indian Bengali films#1940s
