= List of Bangladeshi films of 1984 =

A list of Bangladeshi films released in 1984.

== Releases ==
Title	Director	Cast Cast	Genre	Release dateDate	Notes	Ref.
Bhat De	Amjad Hossain	Alamgir, Shabana, Rajib, Anwar Hossain	Drama		National Award-winning film	
Noyoner Alo	Belal Ahmed	Zafar Iqbal, Subarna Mustafa, Kazri			Chartbuster musical tracks	
Andaz		Wasim, Anju Ghosh, Elora				
Rosher Binodini		Rozina				
Sukh Dukher Sathi		Bobita, Sohel Rana				
Mona Pagla	Telly Samad	Telly Samad				
Sharif Badmash	Masud Parvez	Bobita, Sohel Rana				
Chandranath	Chashi Nazrul Islam	Razzak, Doyel, Suchanda, Mustafa				
Abhijan	Razzak	Razzak, Jashim, Ilias Kanchan				
Sokhinar Juddho		Shabana, Anowara				
Chandan Dwiper Rajkanna	Ibne Mizan	Wasim, Anju				
Princess Tina Khan	Akhtaruzzama	Tina Khan, Wasim, Prabir Mitra, Suchanda				
Pention	Rafiqul Bari Chowdhury	Bubul Ahmed, Sohel Rana, Bobita, Suchanda				
Notun Prithibi	Sheikh Nazrul Islam	Razzak, Shabana, Alamgir				
Nepali Meye	Azizur Rahman Buli	Bobita, Mahmud Kali, Jashim, Anjana				
Be-Din		Olivia, Javed				
Agami	Morshedul Islam				A short film	
Norom Gorom		Wasim, Anju, Javed				
Nasib	Mamtaz Ali	Shabana, Uzzal				
Chor	Gazi Mazharul Anwar	Sohel Rana Bobita				
Himmatwali	Ashok Ghosh	Shabana				

== See also ==
- 1984 in Bangladesh
- List of Bangladeshi films
- Cinema of Bangladesh
