= List of Bangladeshi films of 1986 =

A list of Bangladeshi films released in 1986.

== Releases ==
Title	Director	Cast Cast	Genre	Release dateDate	Notes	Ref.
Dhaka 86	Razzak	Bapparaj, Ranjita				
Shuvoda	Chashi Nazrul Islam	Anwara Begum, Mustafa, Razzak, Zeenat, Bulbul Ahmed				
Parineeta	Alamgir Kabir	Ilias Kanchan, Anjana				
Nishana	Ashok Gosh	Shabana, Bulbul Ahmed, Mahmud Kali			Shabana received the best actress award in the National film awards for her role in this film	
Mayer Dabi	Aukat Hossain	Bulbul Ahmed, Selina				
Bish Konnar Prem	Nur Hossain Bolai	Rozina, Wasim, Ilias Kanchan, Anjana				
Miss Bangkok	Iqbal Akhter, Nur Uddin Jahangir	Bobita				
Oshanti	A. J. Mintu	Shabana, Alamgir, Jashim, Natun				
Chapa Dangar Bou	Razzak	Shabana, Bappa Raz, Aruna Biswas				
Ful Shojja	Subhash Dutta	Razzak, Bobita				
Shiri Forhad	Abdus Samad	Alamgir, Shabana				
Dhormo Amar Ma	Dewan Nazrul	Jashim				
Loraku	Shahidul Islam Khokon	Sohel Rana, Rubel, Julia				
Toofan Mail	Shafi Bikrampuri	Razina				
Amie Ostad	Azmal Huda Mithu	Diti				
Julie	Ashok Ghosh	Shabnam, Sohel Rana			Come-back film of Shabnam to Bangladeshi cinema	
Khamosh	Al Masud	Sohel Rana, Bobita				
Hijack	Chhotku Ahmed	Sohel Rana, Bobita				
Birodh	Pramod Chakravorty	Rajesh Khanna, Shabana			Indo-Bangladesh joint production	

== See also ==
- 1986 in Bangladesh
- List of Bangladeshi films of 1987
- List of Bangladeshi films
- Cinema of Bangladesh
