= Bengali films of the 1980s =

Bengali films of the 1980s could refer to:

- List of Bangladeshi films#1980s
- Lists of Indian Bengali films#1980s
