= List of Bangladeshi films of 2007 =

This is a list of Bangladeshi films that were released in 2007.

== Releases ==
Opening	Title	Director	Cast	Genre	Notes	Ref(s)
	Moner Sathe Juddho	Ahmed Nasir	Manna, Purnima, Bapparaj	Romance, action		
	Tumi Koto Sundor	Abid Hasan Badal	Riaz, Purnima			
	Kotha Dao Sathi Hobe	Sohanur Rahman Sohan	Shakib Khan, Shabnur, Apu Biswas	Romance		
	Tomar Jonno Morte Pari	Shafi Iqbal	Shakib Khan, Apu Biswas	Romance		
	Kothin Prem	M B Manik	Shakib Khan, Shabnur	Romance		
	Musa Bhai	M B Manik	Manna, Nodi, Prabir Mitra	Action		
	Jomoj	Shahin-Sumon	Shakib Khan, Popy	Romance		
	Judge Er Raye Fashi	Abu Sufiyan	Rubel, Popy, Alexander Bo, Moni, Rajib, Shakil Khan, Razzak	Action		
	Khomotar Gorom	P A Kajal	Manna, Purnima, Omar Sani	Action		
	Tui Jodi Amar Hoiti Re	Uttam Akash	Shakib Khan, Moushumi	Romance		
	Dhoni Gariber Prem	Abid Hasan Badal	Riaz, Purnima	Romace		
	Babar Koshom	Badiul Alam Khokon	Manna, Nipun Akter, Kazi Hayat	Action		
	Ei Je Duniya	Gazi Mazharul Anwar	Manna, Moushumi, Shabnur, Shahriar Nazim Joy			
	Ulta Palta 69	Malek Afsary	Manna, Purnima			
	Nishiddho Prem	Zillur Rahman	Alexandar Bo, Shilpa, Shohel, Rani, Omar Sani	Action		
	Banglar Don	Mostafizur Rahman Babu	Alexandar Bo, Sahara, Misha Sawdagor	Action		
	Dui Mastan	Nadim Mahmud	Amit Hasan, Poly	Action		
	Ziddi Police		Nodi	Action		
	Paka Khelowar		Amin Khan, Poly	Action		
	Dekhao Guru	Aziz Ahmed Babul	Alexandar Bo, Mizu Ahmed	Action		
	Jomdut		Manna, Nodi, Kazi Hayat, Misha Sawdagor	Action		
	Chandi Gorom	Hanif Akon Dulal	Alexandar Bo, Sagorika, Prince, Shaila, Misha Sawdagor	Action		
	Meye Opohoron	P A Kajol	Amin Khan, Nodi, Nipun Akter, Mehedi, Kazi Hayat	Action		
	Khesharot	Polli Malek	Rubel, Shakiba	Action		
	Toofan Amar Naam	M B Manik	Alexandar Bo, Poly, Misha Sawdagor	Action		
	Danob Shontan	Uttam Akash	Shakib Khan, Popy			
	Rickshawalar Prem	Rokibul Alam Rokib	Manna, Nipun, Alamgir	Romance		
	Mayer Bodla		Sujata, Manna, Nodi, Shakil Khan, Shakira, Doyel, Prabir Mitra			
	Banglar Bou	A K Sohel	Ferdous Ahmed, Moushumi, Nishu, Dr. Ezaz, ATM Shamsuzzaman	Romance		
	Challenger Mukhe	S Alam Shaki	Rubel, Shaila, Omar Sani, Poly, Amit Hasan	Action		
	Jomela Sundori	A K Mohon	Shabnur, Ferdous Ahmed			
	Babu Khuni		Alexandar Bo, Shaila	Action		
	Andhokar Jibon	Sukanta	Amin Khan, Popy, Uzzal	Crime, drama		
	Brishti Bheja Akash	Sohanur Rahman Sohan	Moushumi, Ferdous Ahmed, Sakil Khan	Romance		
	Gram Gonjer Piriti	A K Sohel	Shabnur, Shahriar Nazim Joy	Romance		
	Ziddi Nari	Raju Chowdhury	Amit Hasan, Shah Alam Kiron			
	Danga Domon	Rakibul Alam Rakib	Rubel, Ratna	Action		
	Biyer Lagan	G. Sarkar	Riaz, Jona			
	Bidrohi Raja	Anwar Chowdhury Jibon	Amin Khan, Neha, Alexandar Bo, Shaila	Action		
13 April	Badshah Bhai LLB	Swapan Chowdhury	Amit Hasan, Shaila, Prince, Jinia, Faisal Khan	Action		
	Sajghor	Shah Alam Kiron	Manna, Moushumi, Nipun Akter, Dighi, Kazi Hayat	Drama		
	Dukhini Johora	Azizur Rahman	Shabnur, Ferdous Ahmed, ATM Shamsuzzaman	Romance		
	Jhontu Montu Dui Bhai	Azmal Huda Mithu	Zahid Hasan, Popy, Shimla, Sharmili Ahmed, Sujata, Dr. Ezaz	Comedy, romance		
6 July	Noy No Bipod Songket	Humayun Ahmed	Rahmat Ali, Diti, Jayanta Chattopadhyay, Challenger, Faruk Ahmed, Tania Ahmed, Shadhin Kahsru, Sohel Khan, Asaduzzaman Noor	Comedy, drama		
6 July	Swamir Songshar	Jakir Hossain Raju	Shakib Khan, Shabnur, Apu Biswas, Sohel Rana, Bobita, Khalil	Romance, drama		
13 July	Doctor Bari	M Azijur Rahman	Shakib Khan, Shabnaz	Romance		
20 July	Bullet	Ahmed Ali Mandal	Prince, Nishu, Swapna, Sohel	Action		
	Ghum Haram	Raju Chowdhury	Rubel, Poly, Mizu Ahmed	Action		
	Tension		Amit Hasan, Alexandar Bo, Mizu Ahmed	Action		
27 July	Moydan	Polli Malek	Rubel, Sahara, Mehedi, Shapla, Sadek Bacchu, Ali Raj	Action		
5 August	On the Wings of Dreams	Golam Rabbani Biplab	Mahmuduzzaman Babu, Rokeya Prachi, Fazlur Rahman Babu, Momena Chowdhury	Drama		
10 August	Amar Praner Swami	PA Kajal	Shakib Khan, Shabnur, Nipun Akter, Omar Sani	Romance, drama		
24 August	Bou Er Jala	Firoz Khan Prince	Amit Hasan, Nodi, Nishu, Khaleda Akter Kolpona	Romance		
31 August	Dhoka	Shahin Sumon	Manna, Purnima, Misha Sawdagor	Action		
31 August	Daruchini Dwip	Tauquir Ahmed	Riaz, Momo, Mosharraf Karim, Munmun, Emon, Bindu, Asaduzzaman Noor, Abul Hayat	Drama, comedy, romance	Based on Humayun Ahmed's novel	
	Ma Amar Swargo	Jakir Hossain Raju	Shakib Khan, Purnima, Bobita, Ali Raj, Misha Sawdagor, Nasrin	Drama		
	Meye Shakkhi	Malek Biswas	Riaz, Shabnur			
	Dushmon Khotom	Montazur Rahman Akbar	Nodi, Misha Sawdagor	Action		
	Durdhorsho Durjoy	A J Rana	Rubel, Shaila, Mizu Ahmed	Action		
	Mastan Somrat	Borhan Uddin Rony	Rubel, Keya, Misha Sawdagor	Action		
14 October	Kopal	Hasibul Islam Mizan	Shakib Khan, Shabnur			
14 October	Aha!	Enamul Kabir Nirjhor	Humayun Faridi, Tariq Anam Khan, Fazlur Rahman Babu, Shahidul Alam Shacchu, Ferdous Ahmed, Progya Laboni, Bilkis Yasmine Sathi	Drama		
14 October	Oshtrodhari Rana	Nilu Shimul	Alexandar Bo, Sahara, Noor Mirza, Khaleda Akter Kolpona, Prabir Mitra	Action		
	Priyo Sathi	G Sarker	Shahed, Ratna	Romance		
2 November	Tumi Acho Hridoye	Hasibul Islam Mizan	Kayes Arju, Ayesha Salma Mukti, Rehana Jolly, Abdullah Al Mamun	Romance		
16 November	Banshi	Abu Sayeed	Jayanto Chattopadhyay, Amirul Haque Chowdhury, K.S. Firoz, Mamunul Haque, Tanvin Sweety	Drama		
16 November	Chokkor	Md. Firoz Alam	Alexandar Bo, Sahara, Bijoy Khan, Shiba Banu, Anwara	Action		
23 November	Rokto Pipasha - The Vampire	Masum Parvez Rubel	Rubel, Sohel Rana, Shakil Khan	Action		
23 November	Captain Maruf	Kazi Hayat	Kazi Maruf, Nodi, Mohammad Hossain Jemi, Raka, Nasir Khan	Action		
30 November	Ami Bachte Chai	Razzak	Ilias Kanchan, Apu Biswas, Jona, Shomrat	Drama, action		
	Shanto Keno Oshanto	Ahmed Ali Mandal Md. Salah Uddin	Manna, Shahnaz, Razzak, Dolly Zahur, Humayun Faridi, Dildar	Action		
	Charidike Ondhokar	Masum Parvez Rubel	Rubel, Sadia, Shaila, Ahmed Sharif	Action		
21 December	Shotru Shotru Khela	Mohammad Jainal Abedin	Manna, Moushumi, Swagata, Razzak, Shirin Bakul			
21 December	Ek Buk Jala	Shahin Sumon	Shakib Khan, Shabnur, Moushumi, Suveccha			
21 December	Machine Man	Shafi Iqbal	Manna, Moushumi, Apu Biswas, Kazi Hayat	Action		
21 December	Jiboner Cheye Dami	Mostafizur Rahman Babu	Riaz, Purnima			
21 December	Biyanshab	Abul Kalam Azad	Moushumi, Shabnur, Ferdous Ahmed	Romance		
21 December	Kabin Nama	Shahadat Hossain Liton	Shakib Khan, Apu Biswas, Aruna Biswas, Sujata, Kazi Hayat	Romance		

== See also ==
- List of Bangladeshi films of 2008
- List of Bangladeshi films
- Cinema of Bangladesh
