= List of Bangladeshi films of 2000 =

This is a list of Bangladesh films that were released in 2000.

== Releases ==
Opening	Title	Director	Cast	Genre	Notes	Ref.
2 April	Kittonkhola	Abu Sayeed	Raisul Islam Asad, Mamunur Rashid, Jayanto Chattopadhyay, Azad Abul Kalam	Drama	Based on Selim Al Deen's play Kittonkhola	
17 March	Koshto	Kazi Hayat	Manna, Moushumi, Shakil Khan, Anwar Hossain, Dipjol	Action		
28 April	Jhor	Kazi Hayat	Manna, Anwar Hossain, Dipjol	Action, drama		

== See also ==
- 2000 in Bangladesh
- List of Bangladeshi films of 2001
- List of Bangladeshi films
- Dhallywood
- Cinema of Bangladesh
