= Bengali films of the 1990s =

Bengali films of the 1990s could refer to:

- List of Bangladeshi films#1990s
- Lists of Indian Bengali films#1990s
