= Bengali films of the 1970s =

Bengali films of the 1970s could refer to:

- List of Bangladeshi films#1970s
- Lists of Indian Bengali films#1970s
