= List of Bangladeshi films of 1988 =

A list of Bangladeshi films released in 1988.

== Releases ==
Title	Director	Cast Cast	Genre	Release dateDate	Notes	Ref.
Abortan	Abu Sayeed	Abul Hayat, Laki Inam				
Dui Jibon	Abdullah Al Mamun	Afzal, Diti				
Jogajog	Moinul Hossain	Razzak, Shabnam, Ilias Kanchan, Champa				
Bheja Chokh	Shibly Sadiq	Ilias Kanchan, Champa			Biggest blockbuster of the year with memorable musical tracks	
Pothe Holo Dekha	Hafiz Uddin	Bobita, Alamgir				
Biraj Bou		Faruque, Bobita				
Tolpar	Kabir Anowar					
Hiramoti	Amzad Hossain	Diti, Sohel Chowdhury				
Stri	Ikram Bizu	Shabana				
Agomon	Subhash Dutta	Razzak, Bobita				
Jibon Dhara	Motin Rahman	Rozina, Wasim				
Jantrana	Kazi Hayat	Anju				

== See also ==
- 1988 in Bangladesh
- List of Bangladeshi films of 1989
- List of Bangladeshi films
- Cinema of Bangladesh
