= Bengali films of the 2000s =

Bengali films of the 2000s could refer to:

- List of Bangladeshi films#2000s
- Lists of Indian Bengali films#2000s
