= List of Dhallywood films of 1960 =

The Dhallywood film industry released one feature film in 1960. (Note: Although Kabir and Shikdar date Jago Hua Savera (The Day Shall Dawn) to 1960, Gazdar, Hayat, and Raju date it to 1959, and it won a medal in Moscow in August 1959.)

Title	Director	Starring	Language	Ref.
Asiya	Fateh Lohani	Sumita Devi, Shahid, Kazi Khalek, Soma Mian	Bengali	

== See also ==
- 1960 in Pakistan

== Notes ==
There are numerous minor inconsistencies in transliteration among the sources. Greater discrepancies are as follows:
