= Bengali films of the 1930s =

Bengali films of the 1930s could refer to:

- List of Bangladeshi films#1930s
- Lists of Indian Bengali films#1930s
