= Bengali films of the 1950s =

Bengali films of the 1950s could refer to:

- List of Bangladeshi films#1950s
- Lists of Indian Bengali films#1950s
