= Nasima Khan =

Bangladeshi film actress (1944–2026)

- নাসিমা খান
- Born: 6 August 1944; Dhaka, Bengal Province, British India
- Died: 11 October 2026 (aged 82); Dhaka, Bangladesh
- Occupation: Actress
- Years active: 1959–2011
- Notable work: Jago Hua Savera

Nasima Khan (6 August 1944 – 11 October 2026) was a Bangladeshi film actress.

== Background ==
Khan was born on 6 August 1944 in Lalbagh Thana of Old Dhaka. Her father was Mohammed Masud Khan and grandfather Khan Bahadur Abdul Jalil, a deputy magistrate of Dhaka under the then British Indian government. Jalil bought a home in Lalbagh and moved from Bikrampur during the 1940s. Her ancestral home was in Rarikhal in Sreenagar Upazila of Bikrampur.

Khan died in Dhaka on 11 October 2026, at the age of 82.

== Career ==
In 1959, Khan came to Bengali film industries with the film Jago Hua Savera, directed by A. J. Kardar.

Khan's last film appearance was Kusum Kusum Prem, a Impress Telefilm production, released in 2011.

== Filmography ==
Year	Film	Director	Co-actor	Role	Language	Released date	Note
1959	Jago Hua Savera	A.J. Kardar	Tripti Mitra, Jurain Rasashi, Khan Ataur Rahman, Kazi Khalek, Moina Latif		Urdu	8 May 1959	
1961	Je Nadi Marupothe	Salauddin	Rawshan Ara, Khan Ataur Rahman, Inam Ahmed, Sanjib Dutt		Bengali	28 April 1961	
1962	Surjoslan	Salauddin	Rawshan Ara, Anwar Hossain, Inam Ahmed		Bengali	5 January 1962	
1963	Nasghor	Abdul Zabbar Khan	Golam Mustafa, Shabnam, Nasima Khan, Hasan Imam, Anowar Hossain, Inam Ahmed		Urdu	1 November 1963	
1963	Dharapat	Salauddin	Sujata, Hasan Imam, Kazi Khalek		Bengali	27 December 1963	
1964	Shadi	Kaysar Pasha	Rawshan Ara, Shahid		Urdu	14 February 1964	
1964	Tanha	Baby Islam	Shabnam, HarunRashid, Shamim Ara, Sumita Debi		Urdu	29 May 1964	
1964	Shit Bilel	Mohiuddin	Hasan Imam, Naznin, Aktar Hossain		Bengali	13 November 1964	
1964	Malan	Kaysar Pasha	Shahid, Deep, Jayanti, Jalil		Urdu	26 December 1964	
1966	Kar Bou	Nazmul Islam	Khalil, Subhash Dutt, Anowara		Bengali	18 February 1966	
1966	Ujala	Kamal Ahmed	Sultana Jaman, Anowara		Urdu	11 March 1966	
1966	Begana	S, M, Parvez	Khalil Ullah Khan, Shabnam, Khan Ataur Rahman, Golam Mustafa		Urdu	4 July 1966	
1966	Parwana	Kamal Ahmed	Sultana Zaman, Hasan Imam		Urdu	26 August 1966	
1966	Apon Dulal	Nazrul Islam	Azim, Fateh Lohani, Shawkat Akbor, Sumita Debi		Bengali	11 November 1966	
1967	Uljhan	Azahar	Rosy, Khalil Ullah Khan, Hasan Imam		Urdu	26 May 1967	
1967	Main Bhi Inshan Hoon	Nasir Khan	Attiya, Sujata, Mehmood, Shams Irani		Urdu	27 October 1967	
1967	Dui Bhai	Rahim Newyaz; Nurul Haque	Suchanda, Baby Zaman, Razzak, Fateh Lohani		Bengali	2 January 1968	
1968	Gori	Mohsin	Rahman, Akbar, Khalil		Urdu	10 May 1968	
1970	Aansoo Ban Gaey Moti	M. A. Rasheed	Shamim Ara, Mohammad Ali, Adeeb		Urdu		
1970	Road to Swat	Munnawer Rasheed, Maqsood Malik	Syed Kamal, Aasia		Urdu		
1970	Rong Bodlay	Akbar Kabir Pintu	Khalil, Azim, Sujata, Golam Mustafa		Bengali	3 July 1970	
1970	Dheu Er Pore Dheu	Mahsin	Razzak, Kobori Sarwar, Anwar Hossain, Hashmot		Bengali	28 August 1970	
1971	Amar Bau	Akram	Azim, Supria, Saifuddin		Bengali	22 January 1971	
1973	Paye Cholar Poth	Mehmud	Uzzal, Bobita, Rozi Afsari, Khalil		Bengali	6 July 1973	
1975	Uttaran	Fazlul Haque	Rahman, Shabnam		Bengali	22 July 1975	
1978	Megher Pore Megh	Mahsin	Uzzal, Rahman, Reshma		Bengali	21 July 1978	
2000	Dui Duari	Humayun Ahmed	Riaz, Mahfuz Ahmed, Shaon		Bengali		
	Sundori Badhu	Amjad Hossain	Riaz, Shabnur, Bulbul Ahmed		Bengali	7 December 2000	
2004	Matrityo	Zahid Hossain	Humayun Faridi, Moushumi, Amol Bose		Bengali		
2007	Ekjon Sange Chilo	Swaokat Zamil	Riaz, Moushumi, Shah Alam Kiron		Bengali		
2010	Muhghol-e-azam	Mizanur Rahman Khan Dipu	Sohel Rana, Shabnur, Manna		Bengali	15 October 2010	
2011	Kusum Kusum Prem	Mushfikur Rahman Gulzar	Ferdous, Moushumi, Riaz, Khaleda Akhter Kalpana		Bengali	31 August 2011	
