= List of Bangladeshi films of 1992 =

A list of Bangladeshi films released in 1992.

== Releases ==
Title	Director	Cast	Genre	Notes	Release date	Ref.
Shonkhonil Karagar	Mustafizur Rahman	Zafar Iqbal, Champa, Suborna Mustafa, Momotaz Uddin Ahmed, Dolly Zahur, Abul Hayat, Asaduzzaman Noor	Drama	Based on Humayun Ahmed's novel of the same title.	22 May	
Andho Biswas	Motin Rahman	Alamgir, Shabana, Nutan, Razzak	Drama			
Traash	Kazi Hayat	Manna, Mizu Ahmed, Rajeeb	Action			
Uchit Shikkha						
Radha Krishna	Motin Rahman	Ilias Kanchan, Rozina, Anwara	Romance			
Khoma Nai						
Dhushor Jatra	Abu Sayeed		Drama, History	Based on Bangladesh Liberation War		
Matir Kosom		Ilias Kanchan, Shabnaz	Action			
Anjoli	Darashiko	Shabnaz	Romance			
Beporoa	Kobir Anwar	Ilias Kanchan	Action			
Dinkal						
Padma Nadir Majhi	Goutam Ghose	Raisul Islam Asad, Champa, Utpal Dutt, Rupa Gangooly	Drama	Indo-Bangladesh joint production film		

== See also ==
- 1992 in Bangladesh
- List of Bangladeshi films of 1993
- List of Bangladeshi films
- Cinema of Bangladesh
- Dhallywood
