= List of Bangladeshi films of 2003 =

This is a list of Bangladesh films that were released in 2003.

== Releases ==
Opening	Title	Director	Cast	Genre	Notes	Ref.
4 April	Hason Raja	Chashi Nazrul Islam	Helal Khan, Shomi Kaiser, Shimla, Mukti, Amal Bose, Bobita	Drama, history, romance	Based on the life of Hason Raja	
22 August	Chandrokotha	Humayun Ahmed	Asaduzzaman Noor, Ferdous Ahmed, Meher Afroz Shaon, Ahmed Rubel, Champa, Ejajul Islam	Drama		
12 December	Adhiar	Saidul Anam Tutul	Raisul Islam Asad, Mamunur Rashid, Champa, ATM Shamsuzzaman, Litu Anam	Drama		

== See also ==
- 2003 in Bangladesh
- List of Bangladeshi films of 2004
- List of Bangladeshi films
- Dhallywood
- Cinema of Bangladesh
