= Swopnodanay =

- Bengali: স্বপ্নডানায়
- Written by: Golam Rabbany Biplob; Anisul Hoque
- Starring: Mahmuduzzaman Babu; Rokeya Prachy; Fazlur Rahman Babu
- Cinematography: Mahfuzur Rahman Khan
- Edited by: Junaid Halim
- Music by: Bappa Mazumder
- Production company: Impress Telefilm Limited
- Release date: 5 August 2007
- Running time: 84 minutes
- Country: Bangladesh
- Language: Bengali

Swopnodanay (Bengali: স্বপ্নডানায়, On the Wings of Dreams) is a 2007 Bengali drama film directed and co-written by Golam Rabbany Biplob. It was Bangladesh's submission to the 80th Academy Awards for the Academy Award for Best Foreign Language Film, but was not nominated.

== Plot ==
The story of the movie revolves around a village in Naogaon district. The entire movie's dialogues are in the regional language of Naogaon. The story begins with a hawker in a village market. People call him Fazlu Kabiraj. In fact, he sells ointment in the market. His companion is his ten-year-old son Ratan. One day after the haat, Fazlu goes to a second-hand shop to buy pants for Ratan. After buying the pants he finds some foreign notes in a pocket. What will be the value of this notes, he thinks of his family dreams. When he talks to his childhood friend Siraj Member about this, he gets greedy. Fazlu Kabiraj's life changed in his dream of owning money, and relations with people close to him deteriorated.

== Cast ==
- Mahmuduzzaman Babu as Fazlu
- Rokeya Prachy as Matka
- Fazlur Rahman Babu as Siraj
- Momena Choudhury
- Shamima Islam Tusti as Rehana
- Shoma as Asma
- Golam Rasul Babu
- Shah Alam Kiran
- Gulshan Ara
- Fargana Milton
- Ratan
- Shoma
- Shamoly

== Awards ==
Best Director Asian New Talent Competition 10th Shanghai International Film Festival, 2007

Silver Peacock 38th International Film Festival of India-GOA, 2007

Meril Prothom Alo Awards

- Best Film

== See also ==
- List of Bangladeshi films of 2007
- Cinema of Bangladesh
- List of submissions to the 80th Academy Awards for Best Foreign Language Film
