= List of Bangladeshi films of 1983 =

A list of Bangladeshi films released in 1983.

== Releases ==
Title	Director	Cast Cast	Genre	Release dateDate	Notes	Ref.
Puroskar	C. B. Zaman	Bulbul Ahmed, Jayashree Kabir			won 4 National Film Awards	
Lalu Bhulu	Kamal Ahmed	Sohel Rana			won 3 National Film Awards	
Notun Bou	Abdul Latif Bacchu	Bobita, Subarna Mostafa, Afzal Hossain, Raisul Islam Asad			Received National Film Awards in three categories. Subarna Mustafa obtained as co-best actress but refused	
Nazma	Shubhash Dutt	Razzak, Shabana, Prabir Mitra, Dilara		12 Sept 1983	Shabana obtained best actress	
Pran Sajani	Jahirul Haque	Sohel Rana, Razzak				
Arshinagar	Khan Ataur Rahman	Faruque, Kabari, Prabir Mitra, Tandra Islam				
Shimar	H. Akbar	Faruq, Rozina				
Johnny	Dewan Nazrul	Sohel Rana, Joshin, Suchorita				
Challenge	A. J. Mintu	Babita, Sohel Rana			A blockbuster film of the year	

== See also ==
- List of Bangladeshi films
- Cinema of Bangladesh
