= List of Bangladeshi films of 2001 =

This is a list of Bangladeshi films that were released in 2001.

== Releases ==
Opening	Title	Director	Cast	Genre	Notes	Ref.
	Lalsalu	Tanvir Mokammel	Raisul Islam Asad, Tauquir Ahmed, Mehbooba Mahnoor Chandni, Chitralekha Guho, Rawshan Jamil, Aly Zaker	Drama	Shasur Bari Jindabad (Riaz, Shabnur)	
1 January	Mone Pore Tomake	Montazur Rahman Akbar	Riza, Riya Sen, A.T.M. Shamsuzzaman, Humayun Faridi, Dildar	Romance, drama		
10 March	Milon Hobe Koto Dine	Jakir Hossain Raju	Riaz, Shabnur, Alamgir, Amal Bose	Romance, drama		
20 July	Chairman	Montazur Rahman Akbar	Ilias Kanchan, Rituparna Sengupta	Action		
19 August	Nishwase Tumi Biswase Tumi	Jakir Hossain Raju	Riaz, Shabnur, Purnima, Bulbul Ahmed	Romance		
19 August	Mayer Samman	Gazi Jahangir	Riaz, Purnima, Anwara	Drama		
19 August	Kothin Bastob	Montazur Rahman Akbar	Riaz, Keya, Razzak, Amin Khan, Nasrin	Action		
19 August	Eri Naam Dosti: Ties Never Die	Sayedur Rahman Saeed	Riaz, Shabnur, Aliraj, Nasir Khan	Action, romance, drama		
24 August	Rongbaz Badshah	Montazur Rahman Akbar	Amit Hasan	Action		

== See also ==
- 2001 in Bangladesh
- List of Bangladeshi films of 2002
- List of Bangladeshi films
- Dhallywood
