= Matir Pahar =

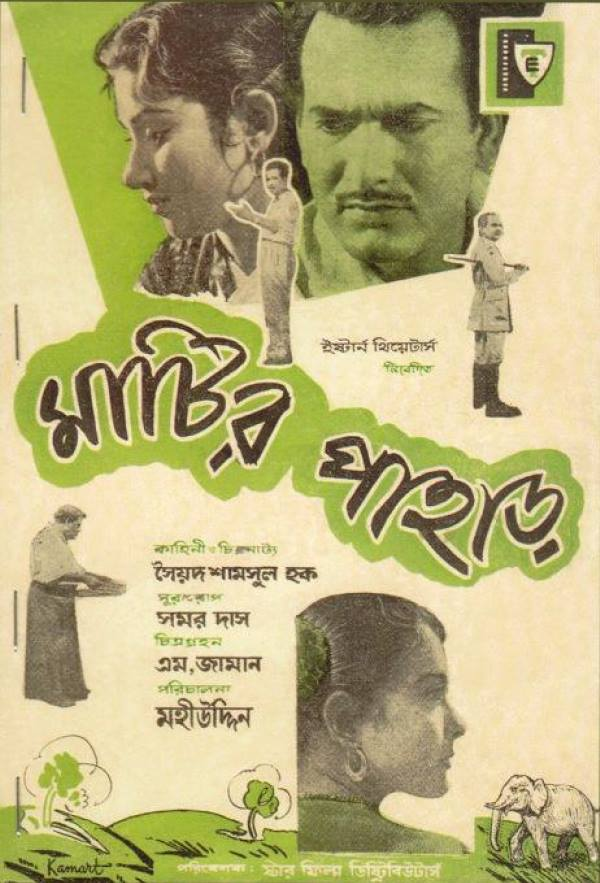
- Film poster
- Directed by: Mohiuddin Ahmad
- Written by: Sayed Shamsul Haque
- Screenplay by: Kazi Mezbah Ujjaman
- Produced by: Sayed Muhammad Parvez
- Music by: Somor Das
- Distributed by: Star Film Distributor
- Release date: 1 January 1959
- Country: Pakistan
- Language: Bengali

Matir Pahar is a 1959 Bengali film. The film was directed by Mohiuddin Ahmad. This was the third film made in East Pakistan (now Bangladesh).

== Cast ==
- Sumita Devi
- Khan Ataur Rahman
- Mesbah Shahjahan

== Response ==
Film critic Ahmed Muztaba Zamal, when asked in 2000 by the magazine Cinemaya to name the top ten films from Bangladesh, named Matir Pahar, made when the country was still East Pakistan, as one of the top twelve.

According to critic Alamgir Kabir, Matir Pahar "failed miserably" at the box office, unable to compete with films made in India and Lahore with established stars.
