= List of Dhallywood films of 1971 =

A list of Dhallywood films released in 1971.

== Releases ==
Title	Director	Cast	Genre	Notes	Release date	Ref.
Nacher Putul	Ashok Ghosh	Shabnam, Razzak				
Smritituku Thak	Alamgir Kumkum					
Shukh Dukhkho						
Meherbaan	Qazi Zahir	Razzak, Shabana, Anwara		Urdu film	15 January 1971	
Jolchhobi	H Akbar	Farooque			22 March 1971	
Gaayer Bodhu	Abdul Jabbar Khan					
Amar Bou	Akram					
Jaltey Suraj Ke Niche	Noor ul Haq	Nadeem, Bobita, Rozina, Sabiha Khanum, Santosh	Romantic	The last Urdu film made from this region.	10 September	
Shesh Rater Tara						

== See also ==
- 1971 in Bangladesh
- List of Bangladeshi films
- Cinema of Bangladesh
- Dhallywood
