= List of Bangladeshi films of 1989 =

This is an incomplete list of Bangladeshi films released in 1989.

== Releases ==
Title	Director	Cast	Genre	Release date	Notes	Ref.
Beder Meye Josna	Tojammel H. Bokul	Ilias Kanchan, Anju Ghosh			All-time blockbuster film in the history of Bangladeshi cinema, until being surpassed in 2023 by Priyotoma	
Bethar Dan	Kamal Ahmed	Shabana, Alamgir, Dilara				
Ranga Bhabi	Matin Rahman	Shabana, Alamgir, Nutan				
Satya Mithya	A. J. Mintu	Shabana, Alamgir, Nutan				
Khotipuran	Malek Afsari	Alamgir, Rozina, Dilara				
Biraha Betha	Chashi Nazrul Islam	Razzak, Bobita, Champa, Sohel Chowdhury				
Birangana Sokhina	Matin Rahman	Bobita, Uzzal, Diti				
Jiner Badshah	Razzak	Razzak, Bapparaj, Ranjita				
Accident						
Chetona		Amit Hasan, Aruna Biswas				
Bhaijan	Raihan Mujib	Shabana, Jashim, Anjana				
Boner Moto Bon	Darashiko	Ilias Kanchan, Sunetra				
Ain Adalat	Kazi Hayat					
Rangin Nabab Sirajuddaulah	Pradip Dey	Prabir Mitra, Bulbul Ahmed				
Bajramusthi	Shahidul Islam Khokan	Sohel Rana, Suchorita, Rubel				

== See also ==
- 1989 in Bangladesh
