= List of Bangladeshi films of 1974 =

A list of Bangladesh films 1974

Title	Director	Cast	Genre	Notes	Release date	Ref(s)
Sangram	Chashi Nazrul Islam	Suchonda, Khasru, Nuton, Hasan Imam, Darashiko, Khalil, Zahirul Haq	War, History, Drama	Based on Bangladesh Liberation War	18 January	
Alor Michil	Narayan Ghosh Mita	Razzak, Faruk, Anwar Hossain, Bobita	War, History, Drama	Based on Bangladesh Liberation War	25 January	
Kar Hashi Ke Hashe	Ananda					
Banglar 24 Bochor	Mohammad Ali					
Long March Towards Golden Bangla	Alamgir Kabir		Documentary	Based on Bangladesh Liberation War		
Beiyman	Ruhul Amin	Razzak, Kabori Sarwar, Sujata	Romance			
Takar Khela	Azim	Sujata, Azim, Olivia, Hashmat, Narayan Chakrabarty, Maya Hazarika				
Chokher Jole	Aziz Azhar	Razzak, Kabori Sarwar, Anwar Hossain, Rozi Afsary, ATM Shamsuzzaman				
Obak Prithibi	Mostafa Mehmud	Razzak, Shabana, Sulatana Zaman, Mustafa				
Dur Theke Kache	S. M. Shafi	Olivia				
Masud Rana	Sohel Rana	Sohel Rana, Olivia, Kabori Sarwar, Khalil, Golam Mustafa, Fateh Lohani	Spy, Thriller	Based on Qazi Anwar Hussain's thriller titled Bishoron	24 May	

== See also ==
- 1974 in Bangladesh
