= Rawshan Ara =

Bangladeshi film actress

- রওশন আরা
- Born: 3 August 1940; Pabna, British India (present Pabna, Bangladesh)
- Died: 24 June 2010 (aged 69); Dhaka, Bangladesh
- Resting place: Mirpur 11 cemetery, Dhaka
- Other name: Daisy
- Education: Sir Salimullah Medical College
- Occupations: Doctor, actress
- Years active: 1959-1985
- Spouse: Dr. Jahurul Kamal

Rawshan Ara (3 August 1940– 24 June 2010), was a Bangladeshi film actress. Before joining film, She was employed in the doctor's profession. Poet Bande Ali Mia was her brother-in-law and Renowned film actress Suchitra Sen was her friend who also classmates of her school life. In 1959, she made her film debut in the movie Matir Pahar.

== Early life ==
Rawshan Ara was born on 3 August 1940 in Pabna. She was the younger of two sisters. Her nickname was 'Daisy'. As a child, she moved to Rajshahi with her family at the age of 7. She was admitted to Govt. PN Girls School in Rajshahi, followed by family transfer to schools in Bogra and Narail. She returned to Pabna in 1950 and matriculated from Pabna Government Girls' High School in 1954. After that she was admitted to Govt. Edward College, Pabna and passed higher secondary in 1956. Then she was admitted to Mitford Medical College (now Sir Salimullah Medical College) in Dhaka.

== Filmography ==
Film	Films	Director	Co-actors	Role	Language	Released date	Note
1959	Matir Pahar	Mohiuddin	Sultana Zaman, Iqbal		Bengali	28 August 1959	
1961	Je Nodi Morupothe	Salauddin	Khan Ataur Rahman, Sanjiv Dutt		Bengali	28 April 1961	
1962	Surjoslan	Salauddin	Mofiz, Anwar Hossain	Reeta	Bengali	5 January 1962	
1962	Natun Sur	Ehtesham	Rahman		Bengali	23 November 1962	
1964	Shadi	Kaysar Pasha			Urdu	14 February 1964	
1964	Yeati Ek Kahani	SM Shafi			Urdu	26 June 1964	
	Sohana Safor	Kamal Ashraf			Urdu	Was not released	
1965	Nadi o Nari	Sadek Khan	Masud Ali Khan		Bengali	30 July 1965	
1976	Megher Onek Rong	Harun or Rashid	Mahin, Omar Elahi		Bengali	22 November 1976	
