= Raihan Mujib =

Bangladeshi film director

- রায়হান মুজিব
- Occupation: Film director

Raihan Mujib (born 25 September), is a Bangladeshi film director.

== Biography ==
Mujib's debut direction was Hero. He was the director Bhaijan which film won National Film Award in one category in 1989. He also directed films like Kajer Beti Rahima, Teji Sontan and Atmo Ohongkar. These films are selected for preservation in Bangladesh Film Archive. He also directed Jamin Nai. Shakti Kapoor was the main antagonist in this film. His last direction was Jogot Songsar.

== Selected filmography ==
- Hero
- Bhaijan
- Kajer Beti Rahima
- Agnipurush
- Atmo Ohongkar
- Prem Preeti
- Raja Gunda
- Akheri Mokabela
- Hingsar Agun
- Teji Sontan
- Jamin Nai
- Jogot Songsar
