= Ramer Sumati (1985 film) =

Bangladeshi drama film

- YouTube version poster
- Directed by: Shahidul Amin
- Screenplay by: Shahidul Amin
- Story by: Sarat Chandra Chattopadhyay
- Produced by: Begum Amina Ahmed
- Starring: Joy; Bobita; Prabir Mitra; Suchanda; Rowshan Jamil; Saifuddin
- Cinematography: Mohammad Saeed Khan
- Edited by: Lutfar Rahman
- Music by: Mansur Ahmed
- Release date: 1985
- Running time: 115 minutes
- Country: Bangladesh
- Language: Bengali

Ramer Sumati is a 1985 Bangladeshi drama film starring Bobita and Joy in lead roles. Prabir Mitra plays grandfather's role. This is the debut film of actor Sadek Bachchu.

== Synopsis ==
Ram is a teenage boy who is very precocious and wicked. He keeps on creating havoc for villagers. One time he steals a fruit from someone's tree, another time complaints arise that he has stolen a fish from someone's pond and so on. His elder brother Shyam works under the zamindar. His wife dominates him. He only obeys Shyam's wife, Narayani. One day when he got into a dispute with the zamindar's son, Narayani fought with him and stopped talking to him. Disappointed at this, he realizes his mistake when he loses his relationship with his relatives and decides to leave the village with all his property to his nephew and moves to his mama's house.

== Cast ==
- Joy - Ramlal
- Babita - Narayani / Boudi
- Prabir Mitra - Shyamlal
- Suchanda - Netra
- Raushan Jamil - Narayani's mother
- Nargis - Shikha
- Mahbub Ara Selina-Shikha's sister
- Sadeq Bachchu - Naresh
- Saifuddin - Jageshwar
- Ashish Kumar Loh - Priest
- ATM Shamsuzzaman - School teacher
- Obaidul Haque Sarkar - Zamindar
- Dulari Chakraborty - Naresh's mother
- Himanshu Das Himu
- Kali Babu
- Paran Babu
- Nani Das

== Soundtrack ==
The film's songs have been composed by Mansur Ahmed whereas lyrics were penned by Masud Karim.

No.	Title	Writer(s)	singer(s)	Length
1.	"Rumjhum Nupur Baaje"	Masud Karim	Sabina Yasmin
2.	"Aaj Dadur Biye"	Masud Karim	Baby Nowreen and Shamima Yasmin Deeba
3.	"N/A"	Masud Karim	Runa Laila

== Awards ==
Bangladesh National Film Awards

- Winner: Bangladesh National Film Award for Best Child Artist - Joy
- Winner: Bangladesh National Film Award for Best Actress - Bobita

== See also ==
- Sarat Chandra Chattopadhyay
