= List of Bangladeshi films of 1977 =

A list of Bangladesh films released in 1977.

== Releases ==
Title	Director	Cast	Genre	Notes	Release date	Ref(s)
Simana Periye	Alamgir Kabir	Bulbul Ahmed, Maya Hazarika, Jayasree Kabir, Golam Mustafa	Drama, Romance, Adventure		15 October	
Bosundhora	Subhash Dutta	Bobita, Ilias Kanchan	Drama	Based on 23 Number Tailochitra by Alauddin Al Azad		
Janani	Sirajul Islam	Shabana, Anwara	Drama	Based on novel by Shaukat Osman. Shabana refused to taken for sub best actress nominate on "National Film Award"		
Jadur Bashi	Abdul Latif Bacchu	Suchorita, Razzak, Sultana Zaman, Bulbul Ahmed, Olivia, Apu Sarwar	Romance	Runa Laila obtained "National Film Award" with the best as female singer.		
Ononto Prem	Razzak	Razzak, Bobita	Romance	Razzak on debut direction film		

== See also ==
- 1977 in Bangladesh
