= List of Bangladeshi films of 1990 =

A list of Bangladeshi films released in 1990.

Title	Director	Cast	Genre	Notes	Ref.
Moroner Pore	Mohammad Azharul Islam	Shabana, Alamgir, Anwara Begum, Golam Mustafa	Drama		
Goriber Bou	Kamal Ahmed	Shabana, Alamgir, Manna, Aruna Biswas, Anwara Begum	Drama		
Dolna	Shibli Sadik	Alamgir, Rozina, Khalil	Romance		
Lakhe Ekta	Kazi Kamal	Farooque, Suchorita, Olivia	Romance		
Chutir Phande	Shahidul Haque Khan	Golam Mustafa, Uzzal, Jhumur Ganguly, Zafar Iqbal, Rozina			

== See also ==
- 1990 in Bangladesh
