= List of Bangladeshi films of 1975 =

A list of Bangladesh films released in 1975.

== Releases ==
Title	Director	Cast	Genre	Release date	Notes	Ref(s)
Sujon Sokhi	Pramod Kar (Khan Ataur Rahman)	Farooque, Kabori Sarwar, Minu Rahman, Sumita Devi, Rawshan Jamil, Khan Ataur Rahman, Tele Samad	Romance, Drama	11 October	Screenplay was also written by Khan Ataur Rahman	
Charitraheen -(Characterless)	Baby Islam	Mina Khan, Sheli, Prabir Mitra, Mostafa, Rowshan Jamil	Drama	1975		
Bandi Theke Begum	Mohsin	Razzak, BobitaZafor Iqbal		28 February	Bobita won best actree	
Chashir Meye	Babul Chowdhury	Shabana, Alamgir, Prabir Mitra, Anwara, Tele Samad	Romance	20 June		
Lathial	Narayan Ghosh Mita	Anwar Hossain, Farooque, Bobita, Rosy Afsari	Drama	22 August	won 1st National Film Awards in best film and 4 other categories	
Epar Opar	Sohel Rana	Sohel Rana, Soma Mukherjee	Romance, Drama		Based in Mideastern story while name "alie asma"	

== See also ==
- 1975 in Bangladesh
