= Agami (film) =

- Poster
- Directed by: Morshedul Islam
- Starring: Pijush Banerjee; Rowshan Zamil; Ali Zaker
- Music by: Shimul Yusuf
- Release date: February 1984
- Running time: 25 minutes
- Country: Bangladesh
- Language: Bengali

Agami (English: Time Ahead) (Bengali: আগামী) is a 1984 Bangladeshi film starring Pijush Banerjee, Aly Zaker and Rowshan in lead roles. It received a National Film Award for Best Short-length film. It deals with the 1971 Independence war of Bangladesh.

== Awards ==
Bangladesh National Film Awards

- Best Short-length film - Morshedul Islam
