= List of Bangladeshi films of 1982 =

A list of Bangladeshi films released in 1982.

== Releases ==
Title	Director	Cast Cast	Genre	Release date	Notes	Ref.
Boro Bhalo Lok Chhilo	Mohammad Mohihuddin	Razzak, Prabir Mitra			won 6 National Film Awards	
Dui Poisar Alta	Amjad Hossain	Shabana			Won 5 National Film Awards	
Mohona	Alamgir Kabir	Bulbul Ahmed, Jayshree Kabir, Ilias Kanchan, Anjana			Received National Film Awards in one category	
Boro Barir Meye	Abdus Samad Khokan, Amzad Hossain	Alamgir, Bobita, Ilias Kanchan, Kazari				
Rajanigandha	Kamal Ahmed	Razzak, Shabana, Alamgir, Anjana			Received National Film Awards in two categories	
Devdas	Chashi Nazrul Islam	Bulbul Ahmed, Kabari, Anwara				
Lal Kajol	Matin Rahman	Shabana, Faruque, Prabir Mitra, Uzzal, Julia			Rahman's debut as film director	
Chitkar	Matin Rahman					
Nalish	Mamtaz Ali	Shabana, Uzzal, Ilias Kanchan				
Lathyrism	M. Hamid				Produced by Bangladesh Television	

== See also ==
- 1982 in Bangladesh
