= My Bicycle =

- Mor Thengari
- Directed by: Aung Rakhine
- Written by: Aung Rakhine
- Screenplay by: Nasiful Walid
- Produced by: Ma Nan Khing
- Starring: Kamal Mani Chakma; Indira Chakma
- Cinematography: Syed Kashef; Shahbazi
- Edited by: Shamsul Arefin
- Music by: Arjun
- Distributed by: Khona Talkies
- Release date: May 25, 2015 (Rainbow Film Festival)
- Running time: 61 minutes
- Country: Bangladesh
- Language: Chakma
- Budget: $130,000 USD

My Bicycle (Chakma: Mor Thengari) is a Bangladeshi indie film directed by Aung Rakhine. It is the country's first Chakma language film.

The Bangladesh Film Censor Board blocked the commercial release of the film. There were no professional actors involved in the production.

On August 8, 2024, an independent film activist group organized an open screening called #CinemaDehuntis, as part of a reformist movement urging the government to abolish censorship. This initiative is a sub-movement woven into the broader July Revolution in Bangladesh against the Awami government.

== Plot ==
An indigenous man named Komol is fired from a job in a town and returns to his hillside native village with only a bicycle. Although his son is happy to have his father back, he has nothing to give his family except the bicycle. Komol decides to not return to the town for new jobs but tries to secure their livelihood through the cycle. He offers to ferry passengers and goods of villagers from place to place on his cycle and earn. Unfortunately, one day an accident occurs, injuring an old man. Village goons threaten Komol and declare that no one can ride on that cycle. When Komol refuses to give them extortion, they destroy his bicycle.

== Cast ==
- Kamal Mani Chakma as Komal
- Indira Chakma as Devi

== Festivals and awards ==
- Best Screenplay, Ufa Silver Akbuzat Ethnic Cinema Festival 2016, Russia
- Honorable Mention, Cine Kurumin - Int. Indigenous Film Festival 2016, Brazil
- Tallinn Black Nights Film Festival 2015, Estonia
- Göteborg Film Festival 2016, Sweden
- Zanzibar International Film Festival 2016, Tanzania
- 17th Asiatica Mediale Film Festival, Rome 2016
- 15th Winnipeg Aboriginal Film festival 2016
- Skabmagovat Film Festival, Finland 2016
- Kasa Asia Film Festival, Span 2016
- Phnom Pehn International Film Festival, Combodia 2016
- Bare Bones International Film and Music Festival, US 2017

== Controversy ==
The film received some international recognition after its exhibition in several international film festivals, including the Tallinn Black Nights Film Festival, Göteborg Film Festival, and Zanzibar International Film Festival. However, it has been banned by the Bangladesh Film Censor Board from screening in Bangladesh. There has been speculation that the censor board may not have been able to evaluate a film in the Chakma language or that the Bangladesh Army may have objected to how its activities in the Chittagong Hill Tracts were depicted.
