= Ranjita =

Bangladeshi actress

- রঞ্জিতা
- Born: 4 March
- Occupations: Actress, producer
- Spouse: Ustad Jahangir (m. 1992, divorced)
- Children: 1 son

Ranjita is a Bangladeshi film actress and producer. She appeared in 29 films and produced 18.

== Biography ==
Ranjita's father was an official in the Ministry of Home Affairs. She grew up in Dhaka and attended Eden Mohila College.

Ranjita acted in popular film "Dhaka 86" in 1986 which was directed by veteran director Shafiqur Rahman and Bapparaj was the Hero of this film. She also acted in Jiner Badsha in 1989 directed by Abdur Razzak.

She suffered a stroke on 28 September 2022 that left her partially paralyzed.

== Filmography ==
- Dhaka 86 (1986)
- Raja Mistri
- Jiner Badsha (1989)
- Maran Bukhay
- Zulumbaaz
- Karate Master
- Premik Rangbaaz (2005)
- Kung Fu Kanya (2008)
- Marana Larai
- "Neel Noksha
