= List of Bangladeshi films of 1987 =

This is a list of Bangladeshi films released in 1987.

== Releases ==
Title	Director	Cast	Genre	Release date	Notes	Ref.
Surrender	Zahirul Haque	Jashim, Shabana				
Ottyachar	Chhotku Ahmed	Bobita, Sohel Rana				
Rajlakshmi Srikanta	Bulbul Ahmed	Bulbul Ahmed, Shabana, Razzak, Nutan				
Opeksha	Dilip Biswas	Shabana, Alamgir, Sucharita, Zafar Iqbal				
Dayi ke?	Aftab Khan Tulu	Ilias Kanchan, Anju				
Desh Bidesh	Azizur Rahman Buli	Shabana, Mahmud Kali, Jashim, Anjana				
Chandidas O Rajakini	Rafiqul Bari Chowdhury	Bobita, Subrata				
Harano Sur	Narayan Ghosh Mita	Sucharita, Subrata				
Lalu Mustan	A.J. Mintu	Shabana, Jashim				
Shandhi	Gazi Mazharul Anowar	Razzak, Shabnam, Zafar Iqbal, Suchorita				
Beer Purush	Shahidul Islam Khokon	Sohel Rana, Rubel, Suchorita				
Swami Stree	Shubhash Dutta	Shabana, Alamgir, Deeti				
Hasi	CB Zaman					
Lady Smuggler	Shamim Ara	Bobita, Babra Sharif, Sohel Chowdhury	Action		Pakistani co-production film	
