= Syed Hasan Imam (actor) =

Bangladeshi actor

- সৈয়দ হাসান ইমাম
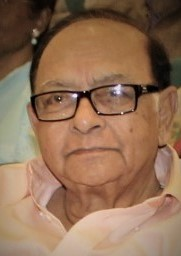
- Born: 27 July 1935 (age 90); Bardhaman, Bengal Presidency, British India
- Occupations: Actor, film director, television director
- Spouse: Laila Hasan (m. 1965)
- Awards: Ekushey Padak; Independence Day Award

Syed Hasan Imam (born 27 July 1935) is an actor, film director, television director and cultural personality in Bangladesh. He earned Ekushey Padak (1999), Independence Day Award (2016) and Bangladesh National Film Award for Lifetime Achievement (2014). He was part of Swadhin Bangla Betar Kendra during the Bangladesh Liberation War in 1971. He became an honorary fellow of Bangla Academy in 2010.

== Early life ==
Imam's father died when he was two years old. He passed matriculation exam from Bardhawan Town School. He then graduated from Burdwan Raj College. He played both cricket and football in West Bengal School teams. He won the first prize in Rabindra Sangeet category in All India Festival. He worked in National Bank of Pakistan.

== Career ==
Imam started his film career with the film Dharapat (1961). He went on to act in films like Raja Elo Shohorey (1964), Sheet Bikel (1964), Janajani (1965), Ujala (1966), Kagojer Nouka (1966), Anarkoli, Sareng Bou (1978) and Ghuddi (1980).

Imam first acted on television in the second play of Bangladesh Television, "Ondhokartai Alo" written and directed by Nurul Momen. He debuted in direction with the film Lalon Fakir (1972), Lal Shobujer Pala (1981) and Obichar.

Imam was one of the co-founders of Cinema and Natok Shilpo Samiti.

== Personal life ==
Imam is married to Laila Hasan since 1965.

== Awards ==
- Standard Chartered–The Daily Star Celebrating Life Lifetime Achievement Award (2018)
