= Baby Zaman =

- বেবি জামান
- Born: Chowdhury Badruzzaman; 28 January 1933; Burdwan, Bengal Presidency, British India
- Died: 26 January 2013 (aged 79)
- Occupation(s): Actor, producer
- Spouse: Rawshan Ara Zaman (m. 1962–2013)
- Father: Choudhury Azfar Hossain

Baby Zaman (28 January 1933 – 26 January 2013) was a Bangladeshi stage, television, film actor and producer.

== Biography ==
Zaman was born Chowdhury Badruzzaman on January 28, 1933, in Burdwan, the second of eight siblings. His father Choudhury Azfar Hossain was a lawyer by profession, but became terribly ill and was unable to support his family. Zaman moved his family to Dhaka in 1953, and provided for them. He also engaged in charitable works, providing food, shelter and education.

Zaman married Rawshan Ara Zaman in 1962.

Zaman started acting in the late 1960s in stage shows and TV shows. He then entered the film industry, playing roles in Jibon Thekey Neya, 13 No. Feku Ostagar Lane, and Kagojer Nouka.

He died on 26 January 2013 from kidney and liver disease, at Bangladesh Medical College in Dhaka, Bangladesh.

== Filmography ==
- Jibon Thekey Neya
- 13 Number Feku Ostagar Lane
- Kagojer Nouka
