= Saifuddin Ahmed =

Bangladeshi actor

- Born: 1927; Dhubri, Assam, British India
- Died: 27 September 2010 (aged 82–83); Dhaka, Bangladesh
- Occupation: Actor

Saifuddin Ahmed (Bengali: সাইফুদ্দিন আহমেদ; 1927 – 27 September 2010) was a Bangladeshi actor. He acted in around 400 films and over 100 television plays. He won a Bangladesh National Film Award for Best Supporting Actor for his role in the film Sundori (1979).

== Career ==
Ahmed started his acting career through Mukh O Mukhosh(1956), the first feature film in Bengali language produced in East Pakistan (now Bangladesh).

== Works ==
- Mukh O Mukhosh (1956)
- Jowar Elo
- Poroshmoni
- Moynamoti
- Etotuku Asha
- Badhu Bidaye
- Neel Akasher Nichey
- Smriti Tumi Bedona
- Shesh Uttor
- Boro Bhalo Lok Chhilo (1982)
- Nachghar
- Ujala
- Banshori
- Shomapti
- Akabaka
- Beder Meye Josna (1989)
- Ramer Shumoti
- Ora Egaro Jon (1972)
- Masud Rana (1974)
- Ghor Shongsar
- Rater Por Din
- Megher Onek Rong
- Sundori (1979)
- Surja Dighal Bari (1979)

== Personal life ==
Ahmed married to Sufia Ahmed on 16 June 1960. They had a son Saeed Ahmed, and three daughters, Farzana Ahmed (Shikha), Farzia Ahmed (Shimmi) and Farrukhi Ahmed (Shaji).
