= Shawkat Akbar =

Bangladeshi film actor (1937–2000)

Shawkat Akbar শওকত আকবর
- Born: Saeed Akbar Hossain; 7 March 1937; Kolkata, British India
- Died: 23 June 2000 (aged 63); London, England
- Occupations: Actor, producer, director
- Years active: 1963–1995

Shawkat Akbar (Bengali: শওকত আকবর) was a Bangladeshi film actor. His career in the Bengali film industry began in 1964 with the film Eito Jibon. He is considered one of the best co-stars of the film industry of Bangladesh. From 1963 to 1995, Shawkat Akbar performed over 250 films including Bengali and Urdu language films.

== Filmography ==
=== Bengali films ===
- Notun Sur (1962)
- Eito Jibon (1964)
- Megh Bannga Rodh (1965)
- Milan (1964)
- Janajani (1965)
- Sat Rang (1965)
- Apon Dulal (1966)
- Bhawal Sanyasi (1966)
- Agun Niye Khela (1967)
- Janglee Phool (1968)
- Alor Pipasha (1969), director
- Momeir Alo (1969)
- Jibon Theke Neya (1970)
- Abuj Mon (1972)
- Chhutir Ghonta (1980)
- Mahanayak
- Beder Meye Josna (1989)
- Beder Meye Josna (Kolkata)
- Hangor Nodi Grenade - (1997)
- Shonkomala
- Avisap
- Sagor
- Oporichita
- Boro Bou
- Ishara
- Fakir Mojnu Shah

=== Urdu films ===
- Talash (1963)
- Paisay (1964)
- Aakhri Station (1965)
- Bhayia (1966)
- Poonam Ki Raat (1966)
- Hamdam (1967)
- Gori (1968)
- Jugnoo (1968)
- Dil Ek Disha
- Waiting room
- Choloe Maan Gaye
- Vaiya
- Berohom
- Shrife Hayat

== Awards ==
- Bangladesh National Film Award for Lifetime Achievement
- Meril Prothom Alo Awards for Lifetime Achievement
