= Kazi Khalek =

- কাজী খালেক
- Born: 1915; Bikrampur, Bengal Presidency, British India (present Munshiganj District, Bangladesh)
- Died: 12 September 1970 (aged 54–55)
- Other name: Swapan Kumar
- Occupations: Actor, film director
- Years active: 1956–1970

Kazi Khalek (1915–1970) was a Bangladeshi film actor. He is known for his outstanding contribution to development of the film industry in Dhaka. In 1958, he entered the film industry starring in the film Asiya, directed by Fateh Lohani. The first movie released by him in Dhaka was Jago Hua Severa, directed by AJ Karadar. In his acting career, he played in 28 films. His notable films include Tomar Amar, Surja Snan, Sonar Kajol, Dharapat, Nadi o Nari, Bhawal Sanyasi, Chaoya Paoya, Nayantara, Natun Diganta, Etotuku Asha, Ballobandhu, Aban Chhita and Je Agune Puri.

== Early life ==
Kazi Khalek was born on 1915 in Bikrampur district of Dhaka (now in Munshiganj district).

== Filmography ==
Year	Film	Director	Role	Language	Notes	Ref.
	Manuser Bhagoban	Udayon Chawdhury (Ismail Mohammad)		Bengali	Kolkatar film	
1959	Jago Hua Savera	A. J. Kardar		Urdu		
1959	Matir Pahar	Mohiuddin		Bengali		
1960	Asiya	Fateh Lohani		Bengali		
1961	Tomar Amar	Mohiuddin		Bengali		
1961	Dur Hain Sukh Ka Gao	A.J. Kardar		Urdu	Unreleased	
1961	Bish Konna	Udayan Chowdhury		Bengali	Unreleased	
1962	Surja Snan	Salahuddin		Bengali		
1962	Sonar Kajol	Kalim Sharafi; Zahir Raihan		Bengali		
1963	Dharapat	Salahuddin	School teacher	Bengali		
1964	Ai to Jibon	Zillur Rahim		Bengali		
1964	Megh Bhanda Rodh	Kazi Khalek		Bengali		
1964	Milon	Rahman		Urdu		
1965	Sat Rang	Fateh Lohani	Social reformer/gang leader	Bengali		
1965	Nadi o Nari	Sadek Khan		Bengali		
1966	Bhawal Sanyasi	Rounaq Chowdhury		Bengali		
1966	Vaiya	Kazi Zahir		Urdu		
1966	Abar Bhano Bhase Roopban	Ibne Mizan		Bengali		
1967	Chaoya Paoya	Narayan Ghosh Mita		Bengali		
1967	Momir Elo	Kazi Khalek		Bengali		
1967	Nayontara	Kazi Zaheer		Bengali		
1968	Sakhina	Nazir Ahmed		Bengali		
1968	Natun Diganta	Artisans		Bengali		
	Azan (Uttaran)	Fazlul Haque		Bengali		
1968	Etotuku Asha	Narayan Ghosh Mita		Bengali		
1968	Bollbandhu	Amjad Hossain		Bengali		
1969	Aban Chhita	Kamal Ahmed		Bengali		
1969	Alor Pipasha	Shawkat Akbar		Bengali		
1969	Nil Akasher Nise	Narayan Ghosh Mita		Bengali		
1970	Je Agune Puri	Amir Hossain		Bengali		
1970	Surjo Othar Age	Nazmul Huda Mintu		Bengali		

== Death ==
Kazi Khaleq died on 12 September 1970.
