= Sultana Zaman =

Bangladeshi film actress and producer

- Born: Musammat Hosne Ara Sharifa Begum; 2 September 1935; Natore District, Bengal Presidency, British India
- Died: 20 May 2012 (aged 76); Dhaka, Bangladesh
- Occupations: Actor; producer
- Years active: 1959–1978
- Spouse: QM Zaman (m. 1956)

Musammat Hosne Ara Sharifa Begum (2 September 1935 – 20 May 2012) was known by the stage name Sultana Zaman. She was a Bangladeshi film actress and producer. In 2009, she was given Bangladesh National Film Award for Lifetime Achievement — the first since the award's inception in 1975.

== Background and family ==
Zaman was born on 2 September 1935 to Syed Abdur Razzaq, an officer of the zamindar of Natore and Rahima Khatun. Zaman passed SSC examination from Natore Girls' School, HSC examination from Rajshahi College. In 1956, she married QM Zaman, the first chief cameraman of Film Development Corporation (FDC) of the then East Pakistan and the cameramen of films including the first Bangla full-length commercial film Mukh O Mukhosh (1956).

== Career ==
Zaman debuted her acting career in 1959 through the film Matir Pahar produced by SM Parvez and directed by Mohiuddin. She adopted her name as Sultana Zaman through the film Anek Diner Chena (1964) directed by Khan Ataur Rahman.

Zaman produced two films, Bhanumati (1969) and Chhadmabeshi. Besides, she was the presenter of the lyric program Chhayachhanda in commercial service of radio and acted in radio plays including Kritodaser Hashi, Tajmahal and Zafran.

== Works ==
- Sonar Kajal (1962)
- Chanda (1962)
- Joar Elo (1962)
- Anek Diner Chena (1964)
- Sat Rang (1965)
- Jana Jani (1965)
- Mala (1965)
- Abar Bhano Bhashe Roopban (1966)
- Ujala (1966)
- Mayor Panki (1967)
- Janglee Phool (1968)
- Natun Diganta (1968)
- Roop Kumari (2968)
- Saptadibga (1968)
- Bedarmie (1969)
- Moner Moto Bou (1969)
- Mere Arman Mere Sapne (1969)
- Eik Zalim Eik Hasina (1970)
- Mehrban (1971)
- Trisna (1978)

== Awards ==
- Bangladesh National Film Award for Lifetime Achievement (2009)
- Chitrakash Award
- National Award (2011) by the Bangladesh Mahila Parishad
