= Khalil Ullah Khan =

Bangladeshi film actor (1934–2014)

- খলিল উল্লাহ খান
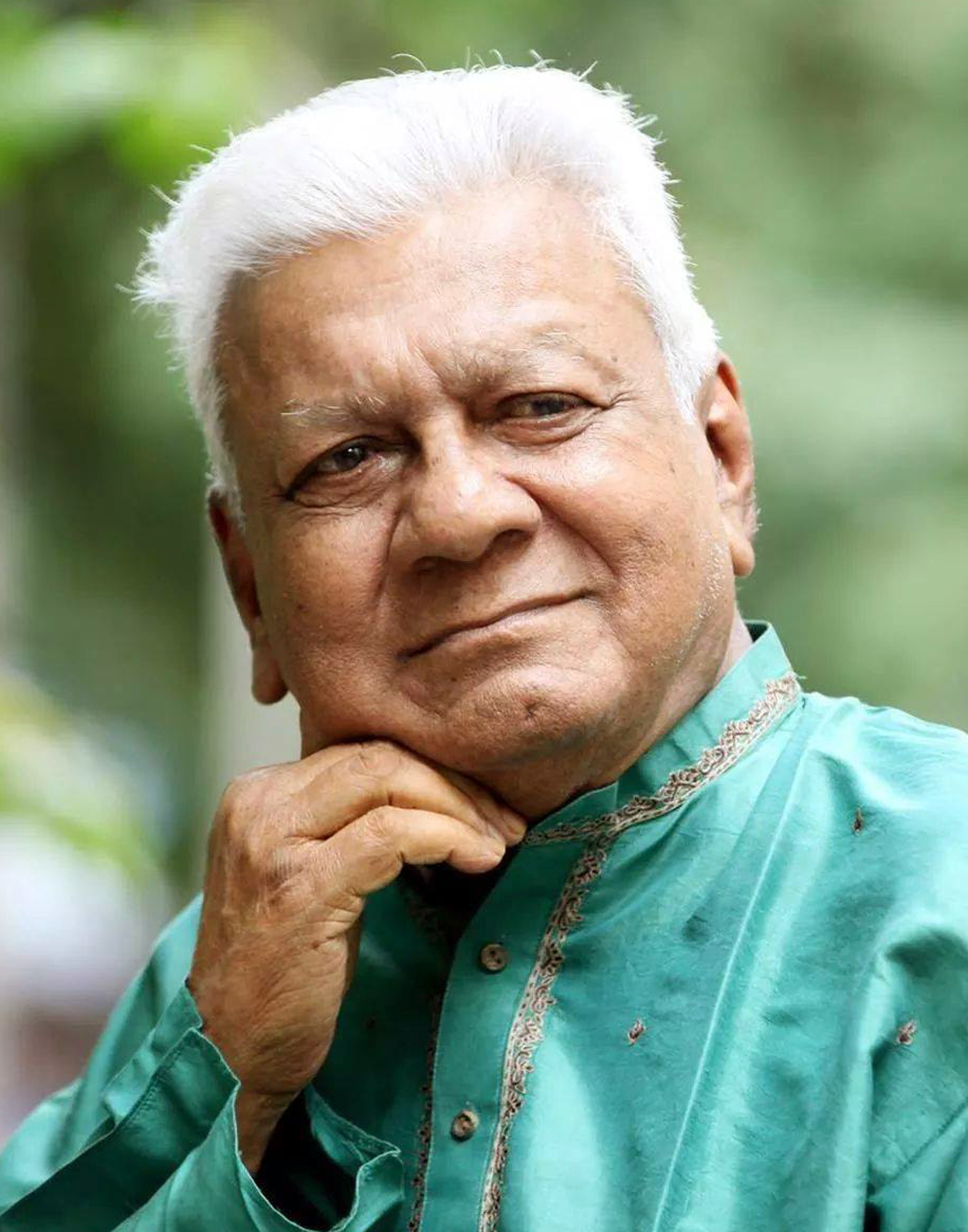
- Born: 2 February 1934; Sylhet, Assam Province, British India
- Died: 7 December 2014 (aged 80); Dhaka, Bangladesh
- Occupation: Actor

Khalil Ullah Khan (known as Khalil; 2 February 1934 – 7 December 2014) was a Bangladeshi film and television actor. He earned Bangladesh National Film Award for Best Supporting Actor for his role in Gunda in 1976.

== Early life and career ==
Khan grew up in Kumarpara, Sylhet. He was a young Ansar officer in the early 1950s. He was suspended from service following an altercation with a union board chairman.

Film producer Masud Chowdhury discovered Khan and cast him in his film Sonar Kajol in 1953. The film was directed jointly by Kalim Sharafi and Zahir Raihan. He went on to act in 11 Urdu language films including Raihan's Sangam, the first color film in Pakistan. After the liberation war he revived his career through films such as Utshorgo and Ekhane Akash Neel.

His received National Film Award for acting in Alamgir Kumkum's Gunda in 1976. In 2012, he won Lifetime Achievement Award. He earned notability for his 'Mia' role on BTV play Sangsaptak. He was also the president of Bangladesh Film Artistes' Association.

== Works ==
- Preet Na Jane Reet (1963)
- Sangam (1964)
- Kajal (1965)
- Bhawal Sanyasi (1966)
- Begana (1966)
- Kar Bou (1966)
- Hamdam (1967)
- Iss Dharti Per (1967)
- Poonam ki Raat (1967)
- Uljham (1967)
- Gori (1968)
- Janglee Phool (1968)
- Bini Sutar Mala
- Masud Rana (1974)
- Sangram (1974)
- Professor (1992) as Rahmat
- Ei ghor ei shongshar (1996)
- Wada
- Bou Kotha Kow
- Sonar Cheye Dami
- Megher Pore Megh
- Modhumoti
- Gunda
- Fuler Moto Bou
- Dadima
- Chachchu (2006)

== Death ==
Khan died of heart ailments on 7 December 2014 at Square hospital in Dhaka, Bangladesh. He had been suffering from lung, liver and kidney ailments for some years and was hospitalized several times after falling critically ill.
