= Satya Saha discography =

Satya Saha (1935–1999) was a Bangladeshi music director of Indian origin. He scored music for 119 films. The following is a list of films he scored:

== 1960s ==
Year	Film	Notes
1964	Sutorang	launched lyricists Gazi Mazharul Anwar, Syed Shamsul Haque and singer Anjuman Ara Begum to Bangladeshi Cinema
1965	Janajani	
1965	Rupban	first ever folk film and aldo the first ever musical film of Bangladesh
1966	13 Feku Ostagar Lane	
1966	Behula	
1966	Bhawal Sanyasi	
1966	Gunai Bibi	
1966	Phir Milenge Hum Dono	Urdu film
1967	Ayna O Aboshishto	
1967	Chaowa Paowa	
1967	Saiful Mulq Badiuzzaman	
1968	Abirbhab	
1968	Aparichita	
1968	Banshori	
1968	Chorabali	
1968	Etotuku Asha	
1968	Mere Armaan Mere Sapne	Urdu film
1968	Momer Alo	
1968	Poroshmoni	
1968	Rupbaner Rupkotha	
1969	Alingon	
1969	Nil Akasher Niche	
1969	Pala Bodol	
1969	Padma Nodir Majhi	
1969	Swarno Komol	

== 1970s ==
Year	Film	Notes
1970	Binimoy	
1970	Chhoddobeshi	
1970	Deep Nebhe Nai	
1970	Ko Kho Go Gho Umo	
1970	Notun Probhat	
1970	Pita Putro	
1970	Rong Bodlay	
1970	Sadharon Meye	
1970	Surjo Othar Aage	
1971	Amar Bou	
1971	Gayer Bodhu	
1972	Arunodayer Agnishakkhi	
1972	Dhire Bohe Meghna	Hemanta Mukherjee and Sandhya Mukherjee recorded their first song in Bangladeshi Cinema
1972	Jibon Songeet	
1972	Manusher Mon	
1972	Shikriti	
1972	Somadhan	
1973	Apobad	
1973	Atithi	
1973	Bolaka Mon	
1973	Shopno Diye Ghera	
1974	Alor Michil	
1974	Malka Banu	
1974	Obak Prithibi	
1974	Porichoy	
1975	Aporadh	
1975	Chashir Meye	
1975	Dhonyi Meye	
1975	Haar Jeet	
1975	Lathial	
1975	Surjo Konna	
1976	Akangkha	
1976	Anurodh	
1976	Gormil	
1976	Jaliyat	
1976	Jibon Sathi	
1976	Joy Porajoy	
1976	Monihar	
1976	Noyonmoni	
1976	Protinidhi	
1976	Setu	
1976	Somadhi	
1976	Shapmukti	
1976	Taal Betaal	
1977	Amar Prem	
1977	Anubhab	
1977	Basundhara	
1977	Maa	
1977	Trishna	
1978	Agnishikha	
1978	Alangkar	
1978	Ashami	
1978	Ashikkhito	
1978	Dabi	
1978	Maa	
1978	Modhumita	
1978	Monihar	
1979	Jinjir	
1979	Matir Ghor	

== 1980s ==
Year	Film	Notes
1980	Chhutir Ghonta	
1981	Dena Paona	
1981	Jonota Express	
1981	Lal Sobujer Pala	
1981	Mohanogor	
1981	Ongshidar	
1981	Sonar Tori	
1981	Sukhe Thako	
1981	Swami	
1982	Alta Banu	composed with Ali Hossain
1982	Dokhol	
1982	Jontor Montor	
1982	Lal Kajol	
1983	Mehoman	
1983	Puroskar	directed by himself
1984	Mayer Achol	
1984	Shuvoratri	
1985	Gunai Bibi	
1985	Insaf	
1985	Phuleshwari	
1986	Sadhona	also wrote lyrics
1987	Apekkha	
1987	Sondhi	
1988	Kanchanmala	
1989	Birangona Sokhina	
1989	Ram Rahim John	

== 1990s ==
Year	Film	Notes
1991	Rupbaan	
1991	Shoshurbari	
1995	Lalu Sordar	
1996	Ajante	
1996	Dipu Number Two	
1996	Satyer Mrityu Nei	
1997	Aguner Poroshmoni	Winner: Bangladesh National Film Award for Best Music Director
1997	Samadhan	
1998	Noyonmoni	

== 2000s ==
Year	Film	Notes
2001	Churiwala	Winner: Bangladesh National Film Award for Best Music Director

== 2010s ==
Year	Film	Notes

== 2020s ==
Year	Film	Notes

== Television dramas ==
Year	Drama	Notes
1992	Priyo Podorekha	directed by Humayun Ahmed
1997	Nimphul	

== Background score only ==
Year	Film	Composer	Notes

== Non-film albums ==
Year	Album	Songs	Lyricist	Artist
