= List of Bangladeshi films of 1978 =

A list of Bangladesh films released in 1978.

== Releases ==
Title	Director	Cast	Genre	Release date	Notes	Ref(s)
Golapi Ekhon Traine	Amjad Hossain	Bobita, Rawshan Jamil, Anwar Hossain, Rosy Afsari, Anwara, Farooq	Drama		Best film with eleven categories obtained on "National Film Award".	
Ashikkhito	Azizur Rahman	Razzak, Anjana, Sumon, ATM Shamsuzzaman			On "National Film Award" Razzak obtained best actor	
Shohag	Saiful Azam Kashem (debut)	Razzak, Shabana, Bobita, Bulbul Ahmed				
Agnishikha	Azizur Rohman	Razzak, Bobita, Uzzal, Sultana Zaman	Drama		Razzak sang as solidarity singer in first.	
Badhu Biday	Kazi Zahir	Bulbul Ahmed, Shabana, Koborie				
Alangkar	Kamal Ahmed	Shabana, Razzak, Khalil, Nuton				
Sareng Bou	Abdullah Al Mamun	Kabori Sarwar, Faruk, Ariful Haque, Abdul Kader		16 June	adapted from a novel by noted writer Shahidullah Kaiser	
Dumurer Phul	Subhash Dutta	Shakil			Based from novel "golir dharer chheletie" by Dr Ashraf Siddiquee	

== See also ==
- 1978 in Bangladesh
