= Khondokar Faruk Ahmed =

Bangladeshi singer

Khondokar Faruk Ahmed (1 January 1940 - 11 July 2001) was a prominent Bangladeshi singer. He was a pioneer of modern Bangla songs.

== Early life ==
Faruk was born on 1 January 1940 in Bogra, Rajshahi, Bangladesh. His father served as a police officer. Faruk received his early education at Bogra Zilla School and Rangamati Zilla School, and later attended Jagannath College. Manna Dey was his favorite singer at that time, and he received training in classical music from the music teacher Mithun Dey.

== Career ==
Faruk was admitted to the Department of Political Science at the University of Dhaka. His friend Parvin Begum discovered Faruk's musical talent and encouraged him to perform at various functions. Singer Anowar Uddin Khan and actor Nazmul Huda further motivated him to pursue a career in music. He received enthusiastic praise from Sachin Dev Burman after performing at a function in Mumbai.

In 1961, Faruk passed the audition for Dhaka Radio. He became widely known after lending his voice to the film Chawa Pawa, directed by Narayan Ghosh Mita. "Rikto Haate Phiriye Dile" was his debut song in films. He later sang in a number of films, including Abhirbhab, Etotuku Asha, Deep Nebhe Nai, Nil Akasher Niche, Jibon Sathi, Alor Michil, Swapno Diye Ghera, Ashikkhito. He was the first choice of many composers for playback singing, particularly as the on-screen voice of leading Bangladeshi Actor Abdur Razzak's lips. Songs such as “Neel akasher niche ami rasta cholechi eka” (Under the blue sky, I walk alone), “Ami nijer mone nijei jeno gopone dhora porechi” (As if secretly caught by my own heart), “Amar e gaan tumi shunbe, jani shunbe” (I know you will listen to my song), “Na hoy ektu kichu ogo tumi bolo” (At least say something, my dear), “Ar koto dure ure jabi ore amar bolaka mon” (How far will you fly away, my crane-like heart), “Kothay tomay jeno dekhechi” (I feel like I’ve seen you somewhere), “Rikto hate jare phirae dile ogo bondhu” (O friend, whom you turned away empty-handed), and “Amar bou keno kotha koy na” (Why doesn't my wife speak to me?) became instant hits in the respective films. He performed duets with singers such as Sabina Yasmin, Ferdousi Rahman, Shahnaz Rahmatullah. He also lent his voice to patriotic chorus songs alongside Ajit Roy, Mahmudun Nabi and Syed Abdul Hadi. Eminent Bangladeshi singer Runa Laila's debut Bangladeshi song "O Jibon Sathi Tumi Amar" was also a duet with Faruk. His song "Kache Eshe Tumi Bolo" from Abirbhab gained significant popularity as well.

Faruk sang in a total of 133 films. He formed a strong bond with music director Satya Saha, who introduced him to playback singing in films. As a result, of the 133 films Faruk sang in, Satya Saha was the music composer for 128 of them

His radio songs, including “Basonti rong sharee pore” (Wearing a sari of spring's color), “Sedin tumi ki jeno ki bhabchhile” (That day you were thinking something, what was it?), “Prothom dekhar shei din” (That day of our first meeting), “Ke jeno aral hote dake amare” (Someone calls me from behind the veil), and “Sohagi lo ki deb bolo” (O beloved, tell me what gift you desire) — were widely appreciated and resonated throughout the entire country.

Abdul Hamid Khan Bhasani, impressed by Ahmed's rendition of the song "Rickshawala Bole Kare Aj Ghrina Koro," awarded him a gold medal. The song achieved popularity among the working class.

Though most music composers preferred Faruk as their first choice for playback singing, he gradually became more selective in accepting songs, a shift that created challenges for the continuous growth of his career.

== Accolades ==
Faruk was present at the first recording of the national anthem of Bangladesh alongside Ajit Roy, Nilufar Yasmin, Mahmudun Nabi, Sabina Yasmin and other prominent singers.

In 1968, Faruk was named best television singer in a poll of readers' poll conducted by The Express. He received the 1974 Bachsas Film Award for the song "Dinbodoler Din Eseche Kaan Pete Oi Shono" from the film Alor Michil. An organization based in the United States awarded him the title of "Hunting Singer" in 1980 for his song "Ami Je Pothik Dekhechi." He also received the Bhasani Padak, the Rishijo award and the Shere Bangla Padak.

In 1995, Faruk and Syed Abdul Hadi were given a reception by the US-based organization Commitment upon the completion of 35 years in the music industry.

== Illness and Death ==
Faruk suffered a stroke in 1997. He last performed at a function intended to aid veteran singer Barin Majumder in 1999, despite being in poor health. He ultimately died in 2001.
