= Alangkar =

1978 film

- Poster
- Directed by: Narayan Ghosh Mita
- Starring: Razzak; Shabana; Nutan (actress); Anwar Hossain
- Music by: Satya Saha
- Release date: 1978
- Country: Bangladesh
- Language: Bengali

Alangkar (Bengali: অলংকার) is a 1978 Bangladeshi film directed by Narayan Ghosh Mita. The film received critical acclaim, particularly for the musical score given by Satya Saha and the songs performed by Sabina Yasmin, who won Bangladesh National Film Award for Best Female Playback Singer.

== Cast ==
- Abdur Razzak
- Shabana

== Music ==
All music were composed by Satya Saha. Songs were written by Gazi Mazharul Anwar, Mohammad Rafiquzzaman and Mohammad Moniruzzaman.

=== Track list ===
No.	Title	Singer(s)	Length
1.	"Amar Kobita Shudhu Kobita Noy"	Sabina Yasmin and Khondokar Faruk Ahmed
2.	"Rupe Eto Nojor Dio Na"	Sabina Yasmin and Khondokar Faruk Ahmed
3.	"Ami To Shilpi Noi"	Sabina Yasmin
4.	"Ami Tomar Ganer Pakhi"	Sabina Yasmin
5.	"Bhalobasha Korte Mana"	Sabina Yasmin
6.	"Dukkho Amar Basor Rater Palonko"	Sabina Yasmin

== Awards ==
Bangladesh National Film Awards

- Best Female Playback Singer - Sabina Yasmin
