= Nil Akasher Niche =

East Pakistani film

Neel Akasher Niche
- Directed by: Narayan Ghosh Mita
- Produced by: Imdad Ali
- Starring: Kabari; Razzak; Anwar Hossain; Rozi Samad
- Cinematography: Baby Islam
- Edited by: Md Mofizur Rahaman IMDb
- Music by: Satya Saha
- Release date: 10 October 1969
- Country: Pakistan
- Language: Bengali

Neel Akasher Niche is a 1969 East Pakistani (now Bangladesh) film starring Razzak and Kabari opposite him. The film was directed by Narayan Ghosh Mita. It also stars Rozi Samad and Anwar Hossain.

== Cast ==
- Kabari
- Razzak
- Anwar Hossain
- Rozi Samad
- Rabiul Alam
- Hashmot

== Music ==
The film's music was composed by Satya Saha with lyrics written by Gazi Mazharul Anwar and Mohammad Moniruzzaman. Mohammad Ali Siddiqui, Mahmudunnabi and Ferdousi Rahman provided vocals.

Track	Song-title	Singer(s)
1	"Hesekhele Jibonta Jodi Chole Jay"	Mohammad Ali Siddiqui
2	"Nil Akasher Niche Ami"	Khondokar Faruk Ahmed
3	"Gaan Hoye Ele"	Ferdousi Rahman
4	"Premer Nam Bashona"	Shahnaz Rahmatullah & Mahmudunnabi
5	"Premer Nam Bedona"	Mahmudunnabi
