= Ki Je Kori =

Bangladeshi film

- Poster
- Bengali: কী যে করি
- Directed by: Zahirul Haque
- Produced by: AKM Jahangir Khan
- Starring: Razzak; Anwara Begum; Bobita; ATM Shamsuzzaman
- Release date: 1976
- Country: Bangladesh
- Language: Bengali

Ki Je Kori (Bengali: কী যে করি) is a 1976 Bangladeshi film directed by Zahirul Haque. It stars Razzak and Bobita. Razzak earned his first Bangladesh National Film Award for Best Actor for his performance in the film.

== Synopsis ==
Shahana Chowdhury, a witty lady marries Badshah, a man convicted of murder to win his grandfather's properties. But all her efforts end in smoke when the man is acquitted of his charges.

== Music ==
The film's music is composed by Alam Khan and the lyrics are written by Mukul Chowdhury. The songs are sung by Sabina Yasmin and Mohammad Ali Siddiqui.

Songs	Composer	Lyricist	Singer
"Ore Nach Nach Nach Diwani"	Alam Khan	Mukul Chowdhury	Mohammad Ali Siddiqui
"Mon Debo Ki Debo Na"	Alam Khan	Mukul Chowdhury	Sabina Yasmin
"Shono go Ruposhi Lolona"	Alam Khan	Mukul Chowdhury	Mohammad Ali Siddiqui

== Awards ==
2nd Bangladesh National Film Awards

- Best Actor - Razzak
