= Lathial =

1975 Bangladeshi film

- DVD cover for Lathial
- Bengali: লাঠিয়াল
- Directed by: Narayan Ghosh Mita
- Written by: Shiekh Fazlur Rahman; Zahirul Haque
- Screenplay by: Narayan Ghosh Mita
- Produced by: Narayan Ghosh Mita
- Starring: Bobita; Farooque; Rosy Samad; Anwar Hossain; Narayan Chakraborty
- Cinematography: Rafiqul Bari Chowdhury
- Edited by: Boshir Hossain
- Distributed by: Mitali Films
- Release date: 22 August 1975 (Bangladesh)
- Running time: 97 minutes
- Country: Bangladesh
- Language: Bengali

Lathial (Bengali: লাঠিয়াল) is a Bangladeshi film directed by Narayan Ghosh Mita. The film is the first recipient of National Film Awards. This film was awarded with 6 different categories including Best Film, Best Director, Best Actor, Best Supporting Actor, Best Supporting Actress, Best Art Director.

== Plot ==
Dukhu Mia (Farooque) is a stage performer and his brother Kader Lathial (Anwar Hossain) works for Matbor (Obaidul Haque Sarkar). Dukhu beats Matbor's son Mokbul (A.T.M. Shamsuzzaman) for irritating Banu (Bobita) whom he loves. Matbor complains this to Kader and Kader beat Dukhu for this. This incident becomes the reason of dispute between two brothers. Dukhu leaves home at night and is found by Morol (Narayan Chakraborty) in the banks of river. Dukhu starts a new life there. Banu waits for him and finally one night he comes to meet her. By this time, Matbor sends proposal of marriage of Banu and Mokbul to Banu's father. Kader's wife (Rosy Samad) sends the news to Dukhu but he is going to claim a new river pirate. Matbor is also informed about river pirate on the wedding day. He sends Kader to claim it. Banu and Kader's wife also leave for the new pirate to stop marrying Mokbul. Dukhu and Kader battle to claim the pirate and all of a sudden Kader hits his wife who is trying to stop them. Then they stop fighting. By this time, Matbor comes and scolds Kader. Kader killed Matbor and announces the villages to own the pirate.

== Cast ==
- Bobita as Banu
- Farooque as Dukhu Mia
- Rosy Samad as Kader's wife
- Anwar Hossain as Kader Lathial
- Narayan Chakraborty as Morol
- Obaidul Haque Sarkar as Matbor
- Rina Akram
- A.T.M. Shamsuzzaman as Mokbul
- Abdul Matin as Matin
- Rahima Khatun
- Abdus Sobhan
- Kazi Shafiq
- Zillur Rahman
- Dilip Chakraborty

== Soundtrack ==
The music of this film was directed by Satya Saha and lyrics were penned by Moniruzzaman Monir and Gazi Mazharul Anwar. Abdul Jabbar, Sabina Yasmin, Syed Abdul Hadi, Khondoker Faruque Ahmed and Mohammad Ali Siddique sang in this film.

Track No.	Track title	Singer(s)	Lyrics	Music director
1	Shei to Amar Ma	Abdul Jabbar		Satya Saha
2	Shukher Ashay Sukher Neshay			Satya Saha
3	Oi Agune Purbi			Satya Saha
4	Ami Kokhono Raja			Satya Saha
5	Dekho Dekho Grambasi			Satya Saha
6	Ghater Kokil Ghatey Jarey	Sabina Yasmin		Satya Saha
7	Dholok Bajhe Kashi Bajhe			Satya Saha

== Awards ==
Award Title	Category	Awardee	Result
National Film Awards	Best Film	Narayan Ghosh Mita (Producer)	Won
National Film Awards	Best Director	Narayan Ghosh Mita	Won
National Film Awards	Best Actor	Anwar Hossain	Won
National Film Awards	Best Actor in a Supporting Role	Farooque	Won
National Film Awards	Best Actress in a Supporting Role	Rosy Samad	Won
National Film Awards	Best Editing	Boshir Hossain	Won

== See also ==
- Cinema of Bangladesh
