= Nandirhat Zamindar Bari =

- নন্দিরহাট জমিদার বাড়ি
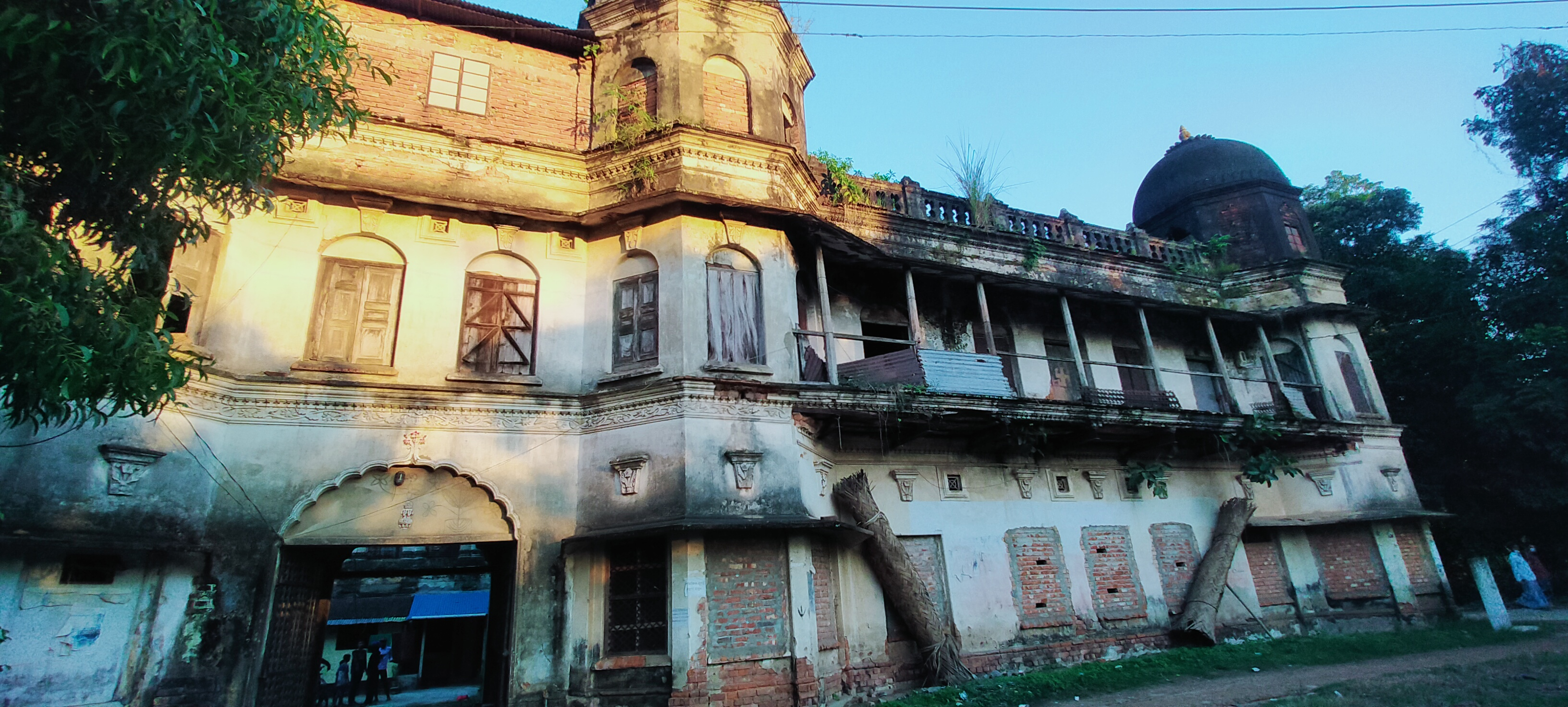
- From front side

General information
- Location: Nandirhat, Hathazari, Chittagong
- Coordinates: 22.4618°N 91.8113°E
- Construction started: 1890
- Owner: Saha Family

Nandirhat Zamindar Bari (also known as House of Satya Saha) was a zamindar residence of Laksmicaran Saha. However, official records identify it as the Zamindar House of Laksmicaran Saha. It is located at Nandirhut, Hathazari. Composer and Musician Satya Saha was born in this house.

== History ==
This zamindar house was built in 1890 by Shree Laksmicaran Saha. Later in 1920, the three brothers, Laksmicaran Saha, Madol Saha and Nishikanta Saha, started zamidari. Their zamidari area were Hathazari, Nazirhat, Dhalai, Gumarmardan, Jobra, Alipur, Fatehabad. They have 12 children. In 1950, zamidari rule was suspended. The last zamindar of this house was Prasanna Saha. In that time, zamindar Prasanna Saha has two Horse-drawn carriages. There were around 50 servants. Each day, cooking was done for 200 to 300 people at a time. Now the house is looked after by Nani Gopal Saha and Swapon Kumar Saha.

== Structure ==
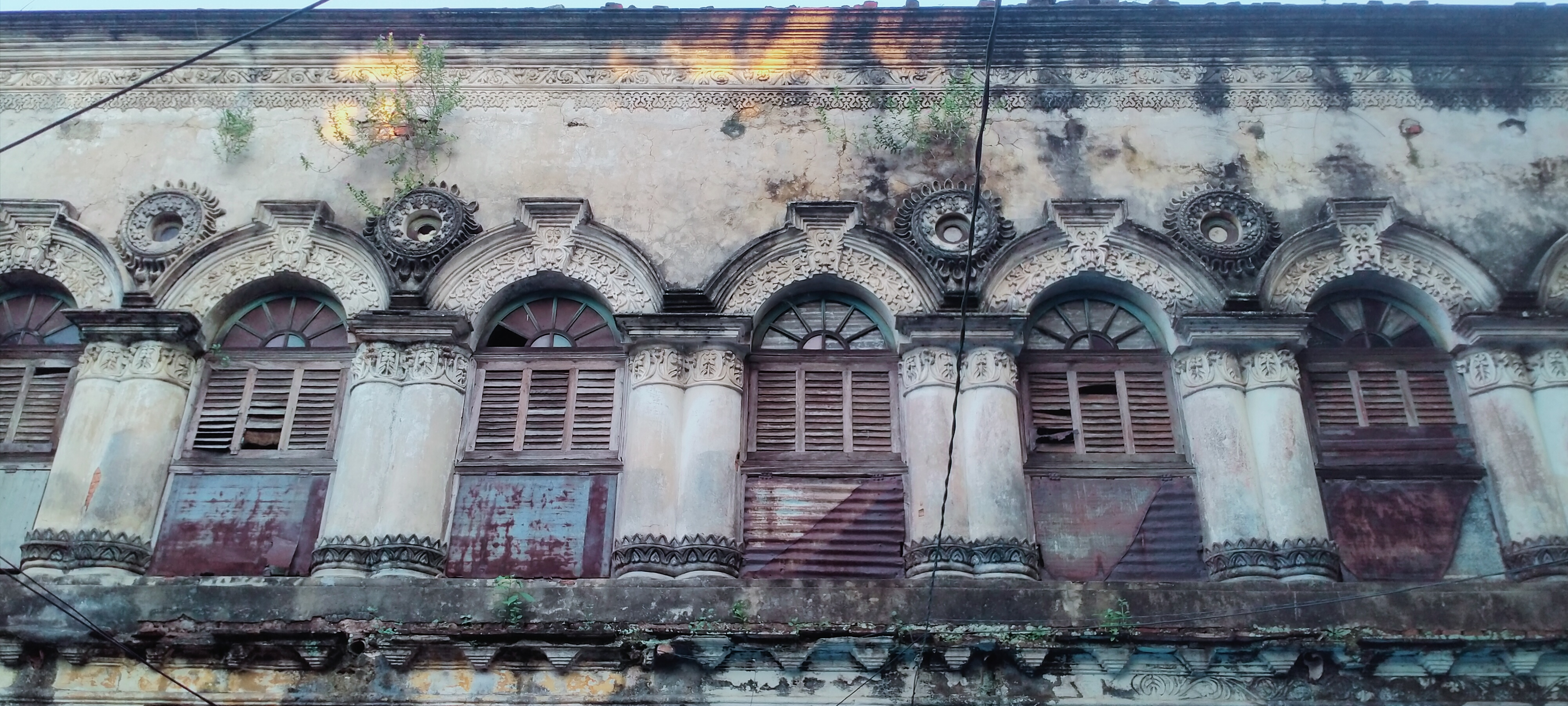
Windows of the house

This house built on 5 acre land. There is various types of designs in the walls. Without any rod, this house was built with rock and brick. Two tombs are standing on the rooftop. The house consists of two sections: the front portion was built by the zamindar Laksmicaran Saha, while the rear portion was constructed by his eldest son, Prasanna Kumar Saha, who was the father of Satya Saha.

== Other installations ==
There are warehouses, rice paddies, kitchens, Sesta houses, crafts in the middle of the house, big temples, three big ponds, equal houses and ghats at the back, barn houses, horse stables in the house.

== Media appearances ==
1975 film named "Asikkhito" was filmed in this house. Producer of this film was Satya Saha. He finished filming the film in 18 days.
