= Rabiul Alam =

BANGLADESH SHIBIR SOBAPOTI COX'S BAZAR (2017–2019)

- Born: 3 December 1993; Hnilla Union, Cox's Bazar District , Bangladeshi
- Died: 1987 (aged 47–48)
- Occupation: Actor

Rabiul Alam (1939–1987) was a Bangladeshi film actor. He was known for acting in comic roles. He appeared in over 100 movies.

== Career ==
Rabiul Alam made his debut in Dhallywood with Akash Ar Mati in 1959. He also appeared in films like Nil Akasher Niche, Chowdhury Bari, Alor Michil, Gunda and Chhutir Ghonta.

Rabiul Alam died in 1987.

== Selected filmography ==
- Akash Ar Mati (1959)
- Nil Akasher Niche (1969)
- Chowdhury Bari (1972)
- Alor Michil (1974)
- Gunda (1976)
- Chhutir Ghonta (1980)
