= Hashmot =

Bangladeshi film actor and director

Hashmot Ullah Khan
- Born: 1936
- Died: 10 November 2003 (aged 67)
- Education: MA (Bangla)
- Alma mater: Dhaka University
- Occupations: Actor, director
- Spouse: Begum Latifa
- Children: 5 (3 sons and 2 daughters)

Hashmot was a Bangladeshi film actor and director. He was known for acting in comic roles. He was also known as Haba Hashmot on the magazine television show Ityadi.

== Biography ==
Hashmot acted in over 100 films. He acted in films like Nil Akasher Niche, Abujh Mon, Rangbaz, Alor Michil, Haba Hashmot and Notun Bou. Besides acting he also involved in film direction.

Hashmat married twice. His son Enayet Khan is involved in music.

Hashmot died on 10 November 2003 at the age of 72. He's buried at Azimpur cemetery.

== Selected filmography ==
=== Actor ===
- Nil Akasher Niche
- Abujh Mon
- Rangbaz
- Alor Michil
- Haba Hashmot
- Notun Bou

=== Director ===
- Swapna Diye Ghera
- Ekhono Akash Nil
- Haba Hashmot
- Madhumita
