= Agun Niye Khela =

1967 Pakistani Bengali-language film

- Poster
- Directed by: Nurul Haque Bachchu, Amjad Hossain
- Screenplay by: Amjad Hossain
- Starring: Razzak; Sujata; Anwar Hossain
- Release date: 1967
- Country: Bangladesh
- Language: Bengali

Agun Niye Khela is a 1967 Bengali-language Pakistani film directed by Nurul Haque Bachchu and Amjad Hossain and stars Razzak and Sujata.

== Music ==
It was the debut film of veteran singer Sabina Yasmin. Composer Altaf Mahmud gave her a chance to sing the song "Modhu Jochnar Dipaboli". Several days went by, the singer feared that her song may be cut of the film. But the music director then gave her another song "Ekti Pakhi Dupure Rode Shongihara Eka" with then established singer Mahmudun Nabi.

Number	Song title	Singer
1	"Ekti Pakhi Dupure Rode Shongihara Eka"	Sabina Yasmin and Mahmudun Nabi
2	"Modhu Jochnar Dipali"	Sabina Yasmin
