= Rangbaaz =

Rangbaaz may refer to:

- Rangbaaz (2013 film), an Indian Bengali-language film starring Dev
- Rangbaaz (TV series), a 2018 Indian web series
- Rangbaz (1973 film), a Bangladeshi film starring Razzak
- Rangbaz (2017 film), a Bangladeshi gangster film starring Shakib Khan
