= Khan Joynul =

Bangladeshi film actor (death 1978)

- Born: 4 July 1936; Ranadiya, Louhajang, British India
- Died: 15 January 1978 (aged 41); Dhaka, Bangladesh
- Resting place: Banani Graveyard
- Other names: Joynul Abedin Khan
- Occupations: Actor, script writer

Khan Joynul (4 July 1936 – 15 January 1976) was a Bangladeshi film actor. He was known for acting in comic roles. He appeared in many films.

== Biography ==
Joynul made his debut in Dhallywood with the film13 Number Feku Ostagar Lane, for which he also served as story and dialogue writer. He acted in films like Nacher Putul, Chhondo Hariye Gelo and Abujh Mon.

Joynul died on 15 January 1978.

== Selected filmography ==
- 13 Number Feku Ostagar Lane *১৩ নং ফেকু ওস্তাগার লেন
- Alor Michil
- 2 -Abar Tora Manus Ho -আবার তোরা মানুষ হো
- Abujh Mon * অবুঝমন
- 4 –Adalalot- আদালত
- 5 -Adarsho Chapakhana -আদর্শ ছাপাখানা
- 6 -Adhar Periya -আঁধার পেরিয়ে
- 7 -Adhare Alo -আঁধারে আলো
- 8- Agun Niye Khela-আগুন নিয়ে খেলা
- 9 -Ak Jalim Ak Hasina -এক জালিম এক হাসিনা
- 10 -Akash Kusum –আকাশকুসুম
- 11 -Akheri Station -আখেরী স্টেশন
- 12- Alo Tumi Aaleya -আলো তুমি আলেয়া
- 13- Alor Pothe -আলোর পথে
- 14 -Amar Bou -আমার বউ
- 15 -Ausru Diya Lekha- অশ্রু দিয়ে লেখা
- 16 -Baadi Theke Begum -বাদী থেকে বেগম
- 17 -Beiman –বেঈমান
- 18 -BimanBala -বিমানবালা
- 19 -Chena Ochena -চেনা অচেনা
- 20 -Chondo Hariya Gelo -ছন্দ হারিয়ে গেলো
- 21 -Choker Jole -চোখের জলে
- 22 -Chorabali -চোরাবালি
- 23 -Dak Peon -ডাক পিওন
- 24 -Dheuer Por Dheu -ঢেউয়ের পর ঢেউ
- 25 -Diner Por Din -দিনের পর দিন
- 26 -Diwana –দিওয়ানা
- 27 –Dorpochurno- দর্পচূর্ণ
- 28 -Dui Digonto -দুই দিগন্ত
- 29 -Dui Porbo -দুই পর্ব
- 30 -Dur Theke Kache -দুর থেকে কাছে
- 31 -Gopal Var –গোপালভাড়
- 32 –Harjit- হারজিৎ
- 33 -Jal theke Jala -জাল থেকে জ্বালা
- 34 -Jhorer Pakhi -ঝড়ের পাখি
- 35 -Jibon Trisna –জীবনতৃষ্ণা
- 36 -JibonSathi -জীবনসাথী
- 37 -Ke Tumi -কে তুমি
- 38 -Kacher Shorgo -কাঁচের স্বর্গ
- 39 -Kach kata Hire কাঁচ কাটা হীরে
- 40 –Kar Hashi Ke Hasha -কার হাসি কে হাসে
- 41 –Ke Palam-কি পেলাম
- 42- Mama Vaigne -মামা ভাগ্নে
- 43- Manusher Mon -মানুষের মন
- 44- Masud Ran –মাসুদরানা
- 45- Matir Maya -মাটির মায়া
- 46 -Mayar Songsar -মায়ার সংসার
- 47- Missor Kumari-মিশর কুমারি
- 48- Modhu Mala -মধু মালা
- 49 -Modhu Milon – মধুমিলন
- 50- Moinamoti –ময়নামতি
- 51- Monchor –মনচোর
- 52- Nacher Putul- নাচের পুতুল
- 53- Nayika –নায়িকা
- 54 -Nil Akasher Niche -নীল আকাশের নীচে
- 55 -Nirhara –নীরহারা
- 56 -Ontorongo –অন্তরঙ্গ
- 57 -Oshanto Dhew -অশান্ত ঢেউ
- 58- Padma Nodir Majhi -পদ্মা নদির মাঝি
- 59 -Paye Cholar Poth -পায়ে চলার পথ
- 60-Peech Dhala Path -পিচ্ ঢালা পথ
- 61-Pinjor-পিঞ্জর
- 62- Polasher Rong-পলাশের রং
- 63 -Porichoy –পরিচয়
- 64- Protishodh –প্রতিশোধ
- 65-Rater Por Din -রাতের পর দিন
- 66- Rokter Dak -রক্তের ডাক
- 67 -Rong Bodlay -রং বদলায়
- 68-Sadharon Meye -সাধারন মেয়ে
- 69 -Saiful Mulk Badiuzzaman -সাইফুল মুলুক বদিউজ্জামান
- 70 -Seslogno –শেষলগ্ন
- 71 -Shadu Soytan -সাধু শয়তান
- 72 -Smriti Tuku Thak স্মৃ-তি টুকু থাক
- 74 -Sokhina –সখিনা
- 75- Sondhekkhon –সন্ধিক্ষণ
- 76 -Songram- সংগ্রাম
- 77 -Sonibarer Chithi -শনিবারের চিঠি
- 78- Sontan-সন্তান
- 79- Soptodinga-সপ্তডিঙ্গা
- 80- Sotinari -সতিনারী
- 81- Sutorang- সুতরাং
- 82 -Takar Khela - টাকার খেলা
- 83- Talash -তালাশ
- 84- Tri Ratno - ত্রিরত্ন
- 85- Vai Bon -ভাই বোন
- 86 -Vul Jokhon Vanglo -ভুল যখন ভাঙ্গলো
- 87 -Yea Kore Biye -ইয়ে করে বিয়ে
