= Kabita (disambiguation) =

Kabita is 1977 Bengali film starring Mala Sinha.

Kabita may also refer to:

- Kabita (actress) (1952–2012), Bangladeshi film actress
- Kabita Sinha (1931–1999), Bengali writer
- Kabita Khanam (born 1957), Bangladeshi judge
- Kabita Kunwar (born 2003), Nepali cricketer
- Kabita Joshi (born 1996), Nepalese cricketer

== See also ==
- Kavita, a feminine given name
