= Surrender (1987 Bangladeshi film) =

Bangladeshi film

- Poster
- Directed by: Zahirul Haque
- Produced by: Nantu Film Productions
- Starring: Jashim; Shabana; Bulbul Ahmed
- Music by: Alam Khan
- Release date: 17 April 1987
- Country: Bangladesh
- Language: Bengali

Surrender (Bengali: সারেন্ডার) is a 1987 Bangladeshi film starring Jashim, Shabana and Bulbul Ahmed. Male playback singer Andrew Kishore and music director Alam Khan earned Bangladesh National Film Awards.

== Music ==
The film's music was composed by Alam Khan, with lyrics by Gazi Mazharul Anwar. The song "Sobai To Bhalobasha Chai" by Andrew Kishore became famous.

Track No	Title	Singer(s)
1	"Gun Bhag Kore"	Andrew Kishore
2	"Ghori Chole Tik Tik"	Andrew Kishore and Runa Laila
3	"Sobai To Bhalobasha Chai (male)"	Andrew Kishore
4	"Sobai To Bhalobasha Chai (duet)"	Andrew Kishore and Sabina Yasmin
5	"Hazar Jyaner Shikha"	Rilia Azam

== Awards ==
Bangladesh National Film Awards

- Best Music Director 1987 – Alam Khan
- Best Male Playback Singer 1987 – Andrew Kishore
