= 13 Number Feku Ostagar Lane =

Pakistani Bengali-language film

- Poster
- Directed by: Bashir Hossain
- Written by: Khan Joynul
- Produced by: Salahuddin
- Starring: Baby Zaman; Sujata; Sirajul Islam; Sumita Devi; Razzak
- Cinematography: Abdus Samad
- Release date: 1966
- Country: Pakistan
- Language: Bengali

13 Number Feku Ostagar Lane is a Bengali-language Pakistani film which was released in 1966. This film is the first pure comedy film of Dhallywood. This is the first film of Razzak in Dhallywood.

== Cast ==
- Baby Zaman - Tetul
- Sujata - Falguni
- Sirajul Islam - Mr. Rabbani, Bariwala
- Sumita Devi - Minu, Bariwali
- Anwara - Bithi, Falguni's sister
- Razzak - Pintu
- Khan Joynul - Pakshi
- Altaf - Pagla
- Kamal Ahmed
- Tejen Chakraborty
- Fatty Mohsin
- Rebecca - Ratri Ray

== Music ==
All songs were composed by Satya Saha. All songs were written by Anisul Haque Chowdhury.

1. "Gaan Noy Gaan Noy Jeno Siren" - Ferdousi Rahman
