= Gunda (1976 film) =

Bangladeshi film

- Poster
- Directed by: Alamgir Kumkum
- Starring: Kabori; Abdur Razzak; Alamgir; Khalil Ullah Khan
- Music by: Alam Khan
- Release date: 6 August 1976
- Country: Bangladesh
- Language: Bengali

Gunda (English: The Terrorist) (Bengali: গুন্ডা) is a 1976 Bangladeshi film starring Alamgir, Abdur Razzak and Kabori opposite him. Khalil Ullah Khan earned Bangladesh National Film Award for Best Supporting Actor.

== Cast ==
- Kabori
- Razzak
- Alamgir
- Khalil Ullah Khan

== Music ==
The film's music was composed by Alam Khan and written by Mukul Chowdhury.

Track No	Title	Singer(s)
1	"Ami Bostir Rani"	Sabina Yasmin
2	"Jeona Priyotoma"	Mohammad Ali Siddiqui
3	"Ami Ek Matal"	Ferdous Wahid
4	"Voy Voy Lage Je"	Sabina Yasmin and Ferdous Wahid

== Awards ==
Bangladesh National Film Awards

- Best Supporting Actor - Khalil Ullah Khan
