= Ka Kha Ga Gha Umo =

Pakistani film

- Poster
- Directed by: Narayan Ghosh Mita
- Written by: Syed Shamsul Haque
- Screenplay by: Baby Islam
- Story by: Kazi Aziz; ATM Shamsuzzaman; Baby Islam; Syed Shamsul Haque
- Produced by: Razzak; Kabari; Baby Islam; Narayan Ghosh Mita
- Starring: Razzak; Kabari Sarwar; Anwar Hossain; Razu Islam
- Cinematography: Baby Islam
- Edited by: Alam Quraishi
- Music by: Altaf Mahmud
- Release date: 13 February 1970
- Country: Pakistan
- Language: Bengali

Ka Kha Ga Gha Umo (ক খ গ ঘ ঙ) is a 1970 Pakistan film directed by Narayan Ghosh Mita. Razzak and Kabari Sarwar plays the lead roles.

== Cast ==
- Razzak
- Kabori Sarwar
- AFM Abdul Ali Lalu

== Shooting ==
The film's shooting began in Chuadanga, the hometown of cinematographer Baby Islam. The shooting took place for 20 days in a house named 'Setab Manzil' which was the maternal grandfather's house of Baby Islam. Actress Kabari had to stay there for a month for the shooting. Later, people named the road in front of that house as 'Kabari Road'. The road was officially recognised in that name by local administration in February 2017.

== Music ==
The film's music has been composed by Altaf Mahmud and the songs were penned by Gazi Mazharul Anwar

- "Aha Cholte Gele Choron" - Ferdousi Rahman
- "Pagla Re Tui Bhober Reeti" - Altaf Mahmud
- "Shaluk Shaluk Biler Jole" - Ferdousi Rahman
- N/A - Abdul Jabbar
- "Jodi Boli Jete Nahi Dibo" - Mohammad Ali Siddiqui and Sabina Yasmin
- "Amar Jhumko Lotar Bajubondhe" - Ferdousi Rahman
