= Churiwala =

- Poster
- Directed by: Shah Alam Kiran
- Screenplay by: Shah Alam Kiran
- Produced by: Vijay Khemka; Jay Khemka
- Starring: Ferdous Ahmef; Madhumita; Soumitra Chatterjee; Shambhu Chatterjee; ATM Shamsuzzaman
- Music by: Satya Saha
- Release date: 2001
- Country: Bangladesh
- Language: Bengali

Churiwala is a 2001 Bangladeshi film directed by Shah Alam Kiran and stars Ferdous Ahmed and Soumitra Chatterjee in the lead roles. The film received National Film Award in three categories and Bachsas Awards in two categories.

== Cast ==
- Ferdous Ahmed
- Madhumita
- Soumitra Chatterjee
- Shambhu Chatterjee
- ATM Shamsuzzaman
- Kharaj Mukherjee

== Music ==
All songs were composed by Satya Saha and Gazi Mazharul Anwar penned the lyrics

No.	Title	singer(s)	Length
1.	"O Churi Rinijhini Bajere"	Alka Yagnik	5:16
2.	"Kar Kachhete Mon Bikao"	Alka Yagnik and Babul Supriyo	5:06
3.	"Tumi Bajale O Bashi Go"	Anuradha Paudwal	5:36
4.	"Nithur Bondidhosha"	Abhijeet Bhattacharya and Anupama Deshpande	5:06
5.	"Raat Anek Holo"	Kumar Sanu ও Mitali Mukherjee	3:39

== Release ==
The film was first released in West Bengal, India. There it became the highest grosser Bengali movie in the last five years. Then, it was released in Bangladesh on 25 May 2001.

== Awards and mominations ==
Award	Category	Nominaee(s)	Result	Ref.
26th Bangladesh National Film Awards	Best Music Director	Satya Saha	Won	
26th Bangladesh National Film Awards	Best Lyrics	Gazi Mazharul Anwar	Won	
26th Bangladesh National Film Awards	Best Comedian	ATM Shamsuzzaman	Won	
23rd Bachsas Awards	Best Music Director	Satya Saha and Emon Saha	Won	
23rd Bachsas Awards	Best Screenplay	Shah Alam Kiran	Won	

== bibliography ==
- Jowad, Abdullah (2010). Cinema of Bangladesh : A history of five decades. Dhaka: Jyotiprakash. EAN 984-70194-0045-9.
