= Kabita (actress) =

Bangladeshi film actress

- Born: c. 1952; Karachi, Dominion of Pakistan
- Died: 8 June 2012 (aged 59–60); Dhaka, Bangladesh
- Occupation: actress
- Known for: Nil Akasher Niche (1969; Dhanyee Meye (1972); Coolie (1997)

Kabita (c. 1952 – 8 June 2012) was a Bangladeshi film actress who starred in films like Dhanyee Meye, Molua, Kanchanmala and Coolie.

== Career ==
Kabita was born in Karachi, Dominion of Pakistan in 1952. Her family moved to Bangladesh after 1971. She made her film debut in 1967 as a child artist in Kanchanmala. Later, she got her breakthrough in 1969 with Nil Akasher Niche where she played a supporting role alongside Kabori Sarwar. Dhanyee Meye is considered her most applauded film. She left Dhallywood after marriage in 1975. She divorced her husband in 1982 and made a comeback. She died on 8 June 2012 in Dhaka.

== Filmography ==
- Dhanyee Meye
- Kanchamala
- Molua (1968)
- Jangli Meye
- Saiful Mulq Badiuzzaman
- Choto Saheb
- Shopbo Diye Ghera
- Nil Akasher Niche (1969)
- Bagha Bangali
- Bahram Badshah
- Ke Asol Ke Nokol
- Nokol Manush
- Loraku
- Jehad
- Pinjar
