= Azad Rahman Shakil =

Bangladeshi film actor

- আজাদ রহমান শাকিল
- Occupation: Film actor
- Years active: 1978–1997
- Notable work: Dumurer Phul; Danpite Chhele
- Awards: National Film Award (2nd time)

Azad Rahman Shakil (popularly known as Master Shakil) is a Bangladeshi film actor. He won Bangladesh National Film Award for Best Child Artist twice for the film Dumurer Phul (1978) and Danpite Chhele (1980).

== Selected films ==
- Dumurer Phul - 1978
- Din Jai Kotha Thakey - 1979
- Danpite Chhele - (1980)
- Lagam - 1981
- Kalmilata - 1981
- Devdas - 1982
- Puroshkar - 1983
- Ekhono Onek Raat - 1997

== Awards and nominations ==
National Film Awards

Year	Award	Category	Film	Result
1978	National Film Award	Best Child Artist	Dumurer Phul	Won
1980	National Film Award	Best Child Artist	Danpite Chhele	Won
