= Danpite Chhele =

1980 Bangladeshi film

- Directed by: Khan Ataur Rahman
- Based on: Teenage Fiction by Makbula Manzoor
- Produced by: Khan Ataur Rahman
- Starring: Razzak; Master Shakil
- Music by: Khan Ataur Rahman
- Release date: 1980
- Country: Bangladesh
- Language: Bengali

Danpite Chhele (English: The Bad Lad; Bengali: ডানপিটে ছেলে) is a 1980 Bangladeshi film starring Razzak and child artist Master Shakil. It is a children's film.

== Cast ==
- Razzak as Teacher of School
- Azad Rahman Shakil, known as Master Shakil as Kamal
- Anowara as mother of Kamal
- Sharmili Ahmed as mother of Tarek
- Nazmul Huda Bachchu

== Music ==
Khan Ataur Rahman composed the songs. All the songs were sung by his daughter Rumana Islam.

- "Hayre Amar Matano Desh" - Rumana Islam
