= Baby Islam =

Indian & Bangladeshi cinematographer & film director

- বেবী ইসলাম
- Born: Anwarul Islam; 1931; Murshidabad, Bengal, India
- Died: 24 May 2010 (aged 78–79); Dhaka, Bangladesh
- Occupations: Cinematographer and film director
- Spouse: Tandra Islam
- Children: 2 including Joy Islam Bangla Islam

Anwarul Islam (known as Baby Islam; 1931 – 24 May 2010) was a Bangladeshi cinematographer and film director. He won the Bangladesh National Film Award for Best Cinematography for the film Charitraheen (1975).

== Early life and education ==
Islam was born in 1931 in Murshidabad, West Bengal to Abdul Hossain Biswas and Motaharun Nessa. He went to a missionary school in Sealdah and moved to Cathedral Mission High School. He matriculated in 1945 before attending Bangabasi College, under the University of Calcutta.

== Career ==
Islam started his career as the assistant of Bengali film director Ajoy Kar. In 1956, he joined as a senior photographer at the Information Department in Dhaka. He served as the general manager of Film Development Corporation (FDC).

Islam was the cinematographer of notable films including Harano Sur, Bor Didi, Saptapadi, Saat Paake Bandha and Kabuliwala. He worked with filmmaker Ritwik Ghatak on two films, Titash Ekti Nadir Naam and Jukti Takko Aar Gappo.

He received the Meril-Prothom Alo Lifetime Achievement Award in 2009 for his outstanding contribution to the Bangladeshi Film Industry.

== Filmography ==
Cinematographer

- Barjatri (1951, assistant camera)
- Harano Sur (1957, assistant cinematographer)
- Akash Ar Mati (1959)
- Surja Snan (1962)
- Nawab Sirajuddaula (1967)
- Nil Akasher Niche (1969)
- Ka Kha Ga Gha Umo (1970)
- Titash Ekti Nadir Naam (1973)
- Jukti Takko Aar Gappo (1974/1977)
- Charitraheen (1975)
- Noyoner Alo (1984)
- Obhijan (1984)
- Premik (1985)
- Bor Didi
- Saptapadi
- Saat Paake Bandha
- Kabuliwala
- Ekattorer Jishu (Jesus '71)

Director

- Tanha (1964)
- Charitraheen (1975)
