= Abdul Ali Lalu =

Bangladeshi Film Actor

- আব্দুল আলী লালু
- Born: 20 October 1932; Mymensingh, Bengal Presidency, British India
- Died: 21 July 2008 (aged 75); Brahmapalli, Mymensingh, Bangladesh
- Other names: Lalu Bhai
- Occupation: Actor
- Spouse: Halima Khatun

AFM Abdul Ali Lalu (20 October 1932 – 21 July 2008) was a Bangladeshi film and television actor mostly in a comedic role. He was notable for his on-screen catchphrase "Koinchhen Dehi" in the television show Jodi Kichu Mone Na Koren, hosted by Fazle Lohani. He acted in more than 100 films.

== Early life and career ==
Lalu was born in Charpara Sehara in Mymensingh to Wajed Ali and Zobeda Khatun. He first acted in a drama titled Palli Samaj, directed by his father. In 1960, he moved to Dhaka for opportunities.

Lalu was an artiste of Bangladesh Television and Bangladesh Betar. He debuted in film acting through the film Surya Snan (1962). Earlier, he worked as an assistant director with Abdul Jabber Khan in the film Mukh O Mukhosh (1956). He performed in the comic serial Triratna, plays Gharua, Anwara and magazine programme Bahurupi.

== Personal life ==
Lalu was an employee of Bangladesh Telegraph and Telephone Board until his retirement in 1989. He was married to Halima Khatun.

== Works ==
Films

- Matir Pahar (1959)
- Surya Snan (1962)
- Dharapat (1963)
- Nach Ghar (1963)
- Dui Diganta (1964)
- Raja Elo Shahorey (1964)
- Sat Rang (1964)
- Janajani (1965)
- Nawab Sirajuddaula (1967)
- Abirbhab (1968)
- Chena Ochena (1968)
- Abanchita (1969)
- Protikar (1969)
- Ka Kha Ga Gha Umo (1970)
- Akhane Akash Neel (1973)
- Badhu Bidhay (1978)
- Achena Athithi
- Kotha Dilam
- Lady Inspector
- Lal Memshaheb
- Meher Banu
- Sonali Akash
