= Khalilur Rahman Babar =

Bangladeshi film actor, director, and producer (1952–2019)

- খলিলুর রহমান বাবর
- Born: 3 February 1952; Dhaka, East Bengal, Dominion of Pakistan
- Died: 26 August 2019 (aged 67); Dhaka, Bangladesh
- Occupations: Actor, director, producer

Khalilur Rahman Babar/ Actor Babar (3 February 1952 – 26 August 2019) was a Bangladeshi film actor, director and producer who acted mainly negative roles in films. He acted in more than 300 films.

== Early life and career ==
Babar was born on 3 February 1952 in Gendaria, Dhaka.

He made his debut in the film arena with Banglar Mukh of Amjad Hossain. He was the lead actor in this film. But, he made his negative role debut on Rangbaz. His last film was Tero Gunda Ek Panda. Besides acting in films he produced Dagi. He directed Doyaban, Dagi, Dadavai too. He has also produced and directed several Bengali drama for different television channels.

== Personal life and death ==
Babar died in Square Hospital on 26 August 2019 at the age of 67. During his departure he left his wife Sultana Rahman, son Riadur Rahman, daughter O Rahman, son in law Richard Kareem, Daughter in Law Sanam and only grand daughter Zaara (OZKK).
