= Abujh Mon =

1972 Bangladeshi film

- Bengali: অবুঝ মন
- Directed by: Kazi Zahir
- Screenplay by: Kazi Zahir
- Starring: Shabana; Abdur Razzak; Sujata
- Cinematography: Abdul Latif Bachchu
- Music by: Altaf Mahmud
- Release date: 1972
- Country: Bangladesh
- Language: Bengali

Abujh Mon (Bengali: অবুঝ মন, 'Tender Mind') is a 1972 Bangladeshi drama film by Kazi Zahir, starring Shabana and Razzak in the lead roles. It was one of the most prominent commercial Bangladeshi films produced in the immediate aftermath of the Bangladesh Liberation War. It was one of seven films selected for the 1973 Bangladesh Film Festival in India.

== Story ==
A Hindu girl, Madhabi Banerjee, and a young Muslim physician, Masum, fall in love. But her father, an influential person in the village opposes their inter-community relationships. In the long run, their love defeats the boundaries of religions.

== Cast ==
- Shabana as Madhabi Banerjee
- Sujata as Rabeya
- Abdur Razzak as Masum
- Khan Joynul
