= Jai Bangladesh =

- Directed by: I. S. Johar
- Starring: Kabari Choudhury and Dilip Dutt; Ramesh Johar (Special Appearance)
- Release date: 1971
- Country: India
- Language: Hindi

Jai Bangladesh (meaning:"Hail Bangladesh") is a 1971 Bollywood military drama film directed by I. S. Johar. The film stars Kabari Choudhury and Dilip Dutt.

== Cast ==
- Kabori Sarwar Choudhury
- Dilip Dutt
- Ambika Johar
- I.S. Johar
- Madhumati
- Tabassum
- Radha Saluja
- Alankar Joshi
- S.N.Banerji
- Rajiv Johar
- Laxmi Chhaya

== Music ==
1. "Duniyawalo O Duniyawalo, Chhote Se Sawal Ka Julam Ke Faile Jaal Ka" – Sushma Shrestha, Lata Mangeshkar
2. "Ruke Na Jo Jhuke Na Jo, Mite Na Jo Dabe Na Jo" – Mahendra Kapoor
3. "Masjid Me Mai Hi" – Kishore Kumar
4. "Dil Tarse Tujhe Dekho" – Usha Mangeshkar, Asha Bhonsle
5. "Zindagi Tumne Laakho Ki" – Asha Bhonsle
