= Narayan Ghosh Mita =

Bangladeshi writer and film director

- Born: 22 December
- Occupation(s): Film director, writer
- Awards: National Film Award

Narayan Ghosh Mita (Bengali: নারায়ণ ঘোষ মিতা) is a Bangladeshi writer and film director. He was the first recipient of National Film Award in best director category.

== Filmography ==
Year	Film	Casts	Notes
1968	Chawa Pawa		Directorial debut
1968	Etotuku Asha	Razzak	
1969	Nil Akasher Niche	Razzak, Kabori Sarwar	
1970	Dip Nebhe Nai	Razzak	
1970	Kokho Gocho	Razzak	
1972	Erao Manush	Razzak	
1974	Alor Michil	Razzak, Bobita	one of the top 10 Best freedom fighter films of Bangladesh
1975	Lathial	Anwar Hossain, Farooque, Bobita	won National Film Award in best director category
1978	Alankar		
	Man Oviman		
	Harano Sur	Subrata	
	Sukher Sangsar	Farooque, Rozian, Anjana	

== See also ==
- Khan Ataur Rahman
- Satya Saha
