= Charitraheen (film) =

1975 film

- Bengali: চরিত্রহীন
- Directed by: Baby Islam
- Based on: Choritrohin novel of Sharatchandra Chattopadhyay
- Starring: Mina Khan; Farhad; Probir Mitra
- Cinematography: Baby Islam
- Music by: Debu Bhattacharya; Lokman Hossain
- Release date: 1975
- Country: Bangladesh
- Language: Bengali

Charitraheen (Bengali: চরিত্রহীন; lit. Characterless) is a 1975 Bangladeshi film directed by Baby Islam. It stars Mina khan and Prabir Mitra. It garnered Bangladesh National Film Awards in two categories: Best Music Direction and Best Cinematographer. It was released on 14 February 1975.

== Cast ==
- Mina Khan
- Probir Mitra

== Awards ==
Bangladesh National Film Awards

- Best Music Director - Debu Bhattacharya and Lokman Hossain Fakir (joint)
- Best Cinematographer - Baby Islam
