= Akash Ar Mati =

1959 film

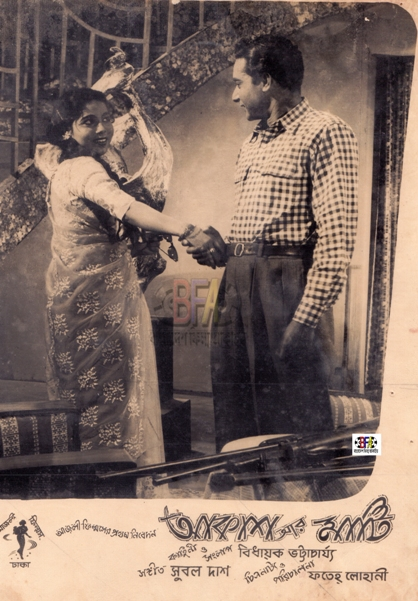
- Promotional poster for Akash ar Mati
- Directed by: Fateh Lohani
- Starring: Sumita Devi; Fazlul Karirt; Madhuri
- Cinematography: Baby Islam
- Music by: Subal Das
- Production company: Film Development Corporation
- Release date: January 1, 1959 (Pakistan)
- Country: East Pakistan
- Box office: Rs. 0.1 crore (US$3,600)

Akash Ar Mati (The Sky and the Earth) is a 1959 black and white film directed by Fateh Lohani and produced by Film Development Corporation (FDC). It was the first sound feature produced in East Pakistan (now Bangladesh) including post-production, though like Mukh O Mukhosh (The Face and the Mask), the first Bengali-language film made in East Pakistan, it used some cast and crew from the West Bengal film industry.

== Background ==
Akash Ar Mati was actor-director Fateh Lohani's second venture. Satrang, an Urdu film directed by him was released in 1965. He based Akash ar Mati on one of dramatist Bidhayak Bhattacharya's stories. A musical film, it was thematically ambitious. But it suffered from poor technical knowledge and the inexperience of film-makers of Dhaka. The film flopped commercially.

Legendary Bangladeshi actress Sumita Devi, Fazlul Karirt, Pradip, the first Bangladeshi hero Aminul Haque, Dagu, Ali, Zinat, Rablul, Madhuri, Tejon, and Ranon acted in the film. Baby Islam was the cinematographer. Subal Das was the music director.

== Cast ==
- Sumita Devi
- Fazlul Karirt
- Madhuri
- Aminul Haque
- Rabiul Alam

== See also ==
- Cinema of Bangladesh
