= Salahuddin (film director) =

Bangladeshi filmmaker

- Born: March 30, 1926; Noakhali, Bengal Presidency, British India
- Died: October 26, 2003 (aged 77); Indianapolis, Indiana, United States
- Occupation: Film director

Salahuddin (March 30, 1926 – October 26, 2003) was a Bangladeshi filmmaker.

== Career ==
Salahuddin made his directorial debut through the film Je Nadi Marupathe (1961). He then created Surjasnan (1962). His most notable work was the film Rupban (1965), which was based on a folk story.

== Works ==
- Je Nadi Maro Pothey (1961)
- Surja Snan (1962)
- Dharapat (1963)
- Rupban (1965, Bengali/Urdu)
- Alomati (1969)
