= Sutorang =

1964 Pakistani Bengali-language film

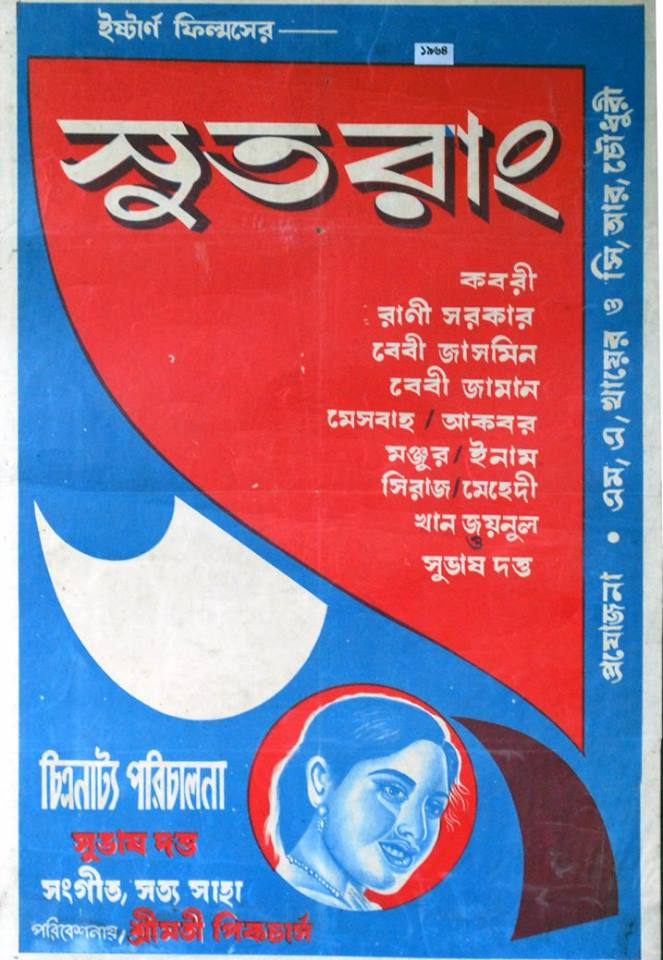
- film poster
- সুতরাং
- Directed by: Subhash Dutta
- Produced by: Subhash Dutta
- Starring: Subhash Dutta; Kabori; Inam Ahmed; Baby Zaman; Rani Sarker; Baby Jesmine
- Release date: 1964
- Country: Pakistan
- Language: Bengali

Sutorang is a 1964 Bengali-language film directed by Subhash Dutta. Dutta played the male lead role as well. Actress Kabori Sarwar made her debut in this film. The film won the second prize in Frankfurt Asia Film in 1964.

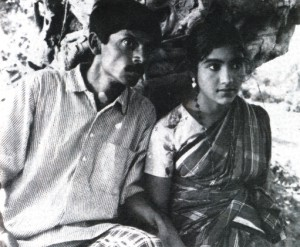
Subash Dutta and Kabori Sarwar in the film set

Ferdausi Rahman sang the song titled "Poraney Dola Dilo Ekhon Bhromora", composed by Satya Saha and Aliya Sharafi sang "Emon Moja Hoi Na".

Film critic Ahmed Muztaba Zamal, when asked by Cinemaya in 2000 to name the top ten films from Bangladesh, named Sutorang, made when the country was still East Pakistan, as one of the top twelve.
