= Rupban =

Pakistani film

- 1965 movie poster
- Directed by: Salahuddin
- Written by: Salahuddin
- Produced by: Salahuddin
- Cinematography: Abdus Samad
- Edited by: Bashir Hossain
- Music by: Satya Saha
- Production company: Salahuddin Productions
- Release date: 5 November 1965
- Country: Pakistan
- Language: Bengali
- Budget: Rs. 1.5 lakh (equivalent to Rs. 7.6 lakh or ৳330,000 in 2021)
- Box office: Rs. 20 lakh (equivalent to Rs. 1.0 crore or ৳4.5 million in 2021)

Rupban (Bengali: রূপবান) is a 1965 East Pakistani Bengali-language black-and-white film written and directed by Salahuddin. Actors included Sujata, Mansur, and Chandona.

Filming took place on location near Sylhet in December 1964 and January 1965, then at Dacca Studio in February.

== Description ==
In the early 1960s, the story of Rupban was very popular in Jatras or open-air folk stage dramas. On the other hand, Bengali movies were struggling in box office due to the competition with big-budget Urdu and Hindi films. Director Salahuddin, who directed 3 Bengali films previously, used the popularity of the Rupban story to revive the market of Bengali films. He watched the Jatra and identified the reasons why it was so popular. And then, he directed the film accordingly. It worked tremendously. The film was so successful, they had to prepare 17 prints to distribute where the regular was 4-5 prints per film. This film solely changed the course of the film industry of the then East Pakistan (now Bangladesh) and revived the Bengali films with the heavily successful stream of folk-based films.
