= Kabori =

Bangladeshi actress (1950–2021)

- কবরী
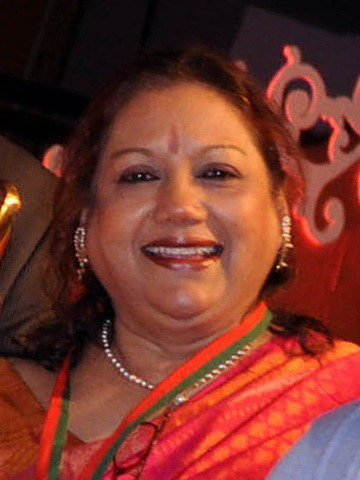
- Kobori at the National Film Awards Ceremony in 2015.

Member of Parliament
- In office 25 January 2009 – 20 November 2013
- Preceded by: Muhammad Gias Uddin
- Succeeded by: Shamim Osman
- Constituency: Narayanganj-4

Personal details
- Born: Mina Pal; 19 July 1950 Boalkhali, Chittagong, East Bengal, Pakistan
- Died: 17 April 2021 (aged 70) Dhaka, Bangladesh
- Spouse(s): Chitta Chowdhury Shafiuddin Sarwar (m. 1978; div. 2008)
- Children: 5 sons
- Occupation: Actress, politician and social worker
- Awards: full list

Sarah Begum Kabori (also Kabori Sarwar, born Mina Pal; 19 July 1950 – 17 April 2021) was a Bangladeshi film actress and politician. Her notable films include Sutorang, Sareng Bou, Abhirbhab, Shat Bhai Champa, Sujon Sokhi, and Lalon Fokir. She received the Bangladesh National Film Award for Best Actress for her role in the film Sareng Bou (1978) and a Lifetime Achievement Award in 2013.

Kabori got involved in politics later in her life. She became an elected member of parliament from the Narayanganj-4 constituency as an Awami League politician in 2008 and served until 2014. She was also an active social worker and women's rights activist. Several film festivals were sponsored by her.

== Early life ==
Kabori was born in Boalkhali, Chittagong, East Bengal, Pakistan. She studied until 8th grade. Her father, Krisna Das Paul, was a Bhajan singer, and her mother used to recite verses from religious books. Kabori was born into a cultural family. Her siblings knew how to dance and sing. And her brother could play the tabla.

== Film career ==
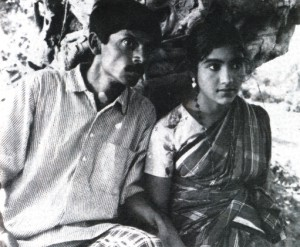
Subhash Dutta and Kabori in the film set "Sutorang" (1964)

Kabori debuted in the film industry at the age of 13. Her first film, Sutorang, directed by Subhash Dutta, was released in 1964. She earned the role through the music director, Satya Saha. In the film, Subhash Dutta changed the actress 'Mina's' name to 'Kabori,' which means 'bun of hair.' With her new name and appearance, Kabori quickly became a symbol of romance for the local audience through her debut in cinema. Kabori starred with Razzak in more than 20 films together since Dutta's Abirbhab in 1968; the films include Nil Akasher Niche (1969), Deep Nebhe Nai (1970), and Ka Kha Ga Gha Umo (1970).

Kabori acted in several films with Farooque in the 1970s, notably Sujon Sokhi and Sareng Bou. She also starred with Bulbul Ahmed in Chashi Nazrul Islam's Devdas (1982). She acted in the 1973 film Titash Ekti Nadir Naam by Ritwik Ghatak, an Indian filmmaker. She also acted in an Urdu film, Bahana, by Zahir Raihan with co-actor Rahman. She also worked with other actors, including Alamgir, Sohel Rana, Uzzal, Wasim, Khan Ataur Rahman, Golam Mustafa, Anwar Hossain, and A.T.M. Shamsuzzaman.

In 2006, Kabori directed the film Ayna.

Kabori authored a book titled "Sritituku Thaak".

== Political career ==
In 2008, Kabori was elected to the National Parliament in Bangladesh from Narayanganj-4 for the 9th Bangladesh Parliament. During the 1971 Liberation War, she participated by donating blood to help the freedom fighters. She had fled to India during the war and worked on a film, "Joy Bangladesh", in Mumbai.

== Personal life ==
Kabori first married Chitta Chowdhury. After the divorce from Chowdhury, she married Shafiuddin Sarwar in 1978. Sarwar is an uncle of politician Shamim Osman. The couple was divorced in 2008. She has five sons.

== Death and legacy ==
After testing positive for COVID-19, Kabori was first admitted to Kurmitola General Hospital and later was shifted to the ICU in Sheikh Russel National Gastroliver Institute and Hospital, where she died on 17 April 2021. She had been working on a film titled Ei Tumi Shei Tumi since 2019.

The 1969 Ka Kha Ga Gha Umo film was shot in Chuadanga. The crew stayed at a house called Setab Manzil. The road around the house started going by the name Kabori Road after Kabori, which became official in February 2017.

== Filmography ==
Year	Film	Role	Notes	Ref.
1964	Sutorang	Jorina	Debut film	
1965	Bahana			
1967	Heeraramon			
1967	Momir Elo			
1967	Sat Bhai Champa			
1967	Bashori	Radha		
1968	Abirbhab	Shahana		
1968	Arun Borun Kiranmala			
1968	Soeey Nadya Jage Pani			
1968	Chorabali			
1969	Nil Akasher Niche			
1969	Moinamoti	Moina		
1970	Deep Nebhe Nai			
1970	Binimoy			
1970	Dorpo Churno			
1970	Je Agune Puri	Kajol		
1970	Ka Kha Ga Gha Umo			
1970	Nayika			
1970	Sontan			
1970	Aka Baka			
1970	Kanch Kata Heera			
1971	Jai Bangladesh		Hindi film	
1971	Jolchhobi			
1972	Apon Por			
1973	Lalon Fokir			
1973	Titash Ekti Nadir Naam	Rajar Jhi	Indo-Bangladesh joint production	
1973	Rangbaz			
1973	Amar Jonmobhumi			
1974	Sadharon Meye			
1974	Masud Rana	Savita		
1975	Sujon Sokhi	Sokhi		
1977	MotiMohol	Firoza		
1977	Love In Simla			
1978	Sareng Bou	Nobitun		
1978	Aguner Alo			
1982	Devdas	Parvoti		
1988	Dui Jibon	Tahmina		
2006	Ayna	Advocate Afroja	Also as director, screenplay and story writer	
2008	Megher Koley Rod	Doctor Selina Hossain		

== Awards ==
Year	Award	Category	Film	Ref
1973	Bachsas Awards	Best Actress	Lalon Fokir	
1975	Bachsas Awards	Best Actress	Sujon Sokhi	
1978	Bangladesh National Film Awards	Best Actress	Sareng Bou	
1978	Bachsas Awards	Best Actress	Sareng Bou	
1988	Bachsas Awards	Best Actress	Dui Jibon	
2008	Bachsas Awards	Honorary Award		
2009	Bachsas Awards	Lifetime Achievement		
2013	National Film Awards	Lifetime Achievement		
2019	Nayakraj Razzak Award			
