= Chitrali (magazine) =

Bengali language film magazine

- Categories: Film magazine
- Frequency: Weekly
- Format: Broadsheet
- Founder: Syed Mohammad Parvez
- Founded: 1953
- Company: Observer House
- Country: Bangladesh
- Language: Bengali

Chitrali (Bengali:চিত্রালী) was a Bengali-language film magazine. Its publisher was the Observer House. It was a weekly magazine that was published every Friday. The magazine was very popular. Syed Mohammad Parvez was editor and Syed Shamsul Haque was the co-editor of the magazine at the time of establishment. Currently this is a defunct weekly.

== History ==
Chitrali was established in 1953 in East Bengal, Pakistan by journalist Syed Mohammad Parvez. Later Co-editor Ahmed Zaman Chowdhury institutionalized the magazine. Its office was in the Co-operative Book Society Building next to Bahadur Shah Park in Dhaka. It was printed in the form of 'Broadsheet'. Chitrali's publishing rights were sold to the Observer House in 1959 due to losses incurred in producing the film Matir Pahar by the editor. After the independence of Bangladesh in 1971, Chitrali was taken over by the government of the country. It was a literature, culture and film based magazine. It had popularity in the region from 1960s to 1970s. It published film performers related news, their rumors, film related news, articles from columnists etc. In 2004, according to Ramen Bhowmik, then senior editor of the weekly Chitrali, the magazine had a circulation of 115,000 to 120,000 copies in the years following 1971, which was then rare. Chitrali's readers' organization was formed. It was called "Chipachas". The magazine was at the top in the seventies. In the late 1980's, the magazine was defunct after a long period of hard work under pressure from other magazines and the dispute between owner and workers at the Observer House. Asaduzzaman Noor and Mahfuz Ahmed have worked in this magazine.
