= Dumurer Phul =

- Poster
- Directed by: Subhash Dutta
- Screenplay by: Subhash Dutta
- Story by: Ashraf Siddiqui
- Produced by: Subhash Dutta
- Starring: Bobita; Ilyas Kanchan; Azad Rahman Shakil
- Edited by: Nurunnabi
- Music by: Azad Rahman
- Release date: 1978
- Country: Bangladesh
- Language: Bengali

Dumurer Phul is a 1978 Bangladeshi children's film starring Ilyas Kanchan, Bobita and Azad Rahman Shakil in lead roles. The film was directed, produced and written by Subhash Dutta. Syed Hasan Imam plays the role of grandfather to the lead actor. The film earned Bangladesh National Film Awards in three categories.

== Cast ==
- Bobita - Nurse Rokiya
- Ilyas Kanchan - Hasan
- Azad Rahman Shakil - Ladu
- Syed Hasan Imam - Ladu's grandfather
- Sirajul Islam

== Music ==
The film's music has been composed by Azad Rahman with lyrics penned by Gazi Mazharul Anwar.

== Accolades ==
4th Bangladesh National Film Awards

- Winner: Best Child Artist - Azad Rahman Shakil
- winner: Best Editing - Nurunabi
- Winner: Best Art Direction - Mohiuddin Faruk
