= Rangbaz (1973 film) =

Bangladeshi film

- Rangbaz movie poster
- Directed by: Zahirul Haque
- Produced by: Rajlakshmi Productions
- Starring: Kabori; Razzak
- Release date: 1973
- Country: Bangladesh
- Language: Bengali

Rangbaz (Bengali: রংবাজ) is a 1973 Bangladeshi film starring Razzak and Kabori. It also stars Khalilur Rahman Babar in his debut as a villain, and Hashmot, among others. Novice Jashim played a minor character with two lines of dialogue and a more important role behind the scenes as an action choreographer.

It is often called the country's first action movie. Razzak, playing a gangster from the slums, introduced the antihero form to Bangladeshi cinema.

In 2017, Kaler Kantho listed Rangbaz among Razzak's ten best films. Upon his death in 2017, Channel i said his uniqueness made Rangbaz a "super-duper hit". According to academic Maswood Akhter, a strong plot and good music made the film a "massive hit".

== Cast ==
- Kabori
- Razzak
- Khalilur Rahman Babar
- Hashmot
- Jashim
