= Sirajul Islam (actor) =

Bangladeshi actor

- সিরাজুল ইসলাম
- Born: 15 May 1938; Hooghly district, Bengal Presidency, British India
- Died: 24 March 2015 (aged 76); Dhaka, Bangladesh
- Resting place: Banani Graveyard, Dhaka
- Occupation: Actor

Sirajul Islam (15 May 1938 – 24 March 2015) was a Bangladeshi actor. He won the Bangladesh National Film Award for Best Supporting Actor in 1984 for his performance in "Chandranath".

== Career ==
Along with his parents, Islam migrated to Dhaka in 1947.

Islam made his directorial debut in 1980 with the film Shonar Horin.

== Personal life ==
Islam was married to Marufa Islam. Together they had three children including Mobassherul Islam.
