= Mahmudun Nabi =

Bangladeshi playback singer (1936-1990)

- মাহমুদুন নবী
- Born: 16 December 1936; Ketu, Bardhaman district, Bengal Presidency, British India
- Died: 20 December 1990 (aged 54)
- Occupation: playback singer
- Spouse: Rashida Chowdhury
- Children: Fahmida Nabi; Samina Chowdhury; Tanzida Nabi; Ridwan Nabi Pancham

Mahmudun Nabi (16 December 1936 – 20 December 1990) was a Bangladeshi playback singer. He was awarded Bangladesh National Film Award for Best Male Playback Singer for his performance in the film The Rain (1976).

== Career ==
Mahmud started his musical career in Bangladesh Betar in the 1960s.

== Works ==
Notable songs

- "Kahin Ro Para Tabassum" film Jeena Bhi Mushqil (1966)
- "Hawa Dheere Behna" film Payal (with Sabina Yasmin)
- "Dekhe Keno Mone Hoy" film Kagojer Nouka (1966) (with Ferdausi Begum)
- "Tumi Kokhon Eshe Dariye Achho" film Abirbhab (1970)
- "Ami Saat Sagar Pari Diye" film Aalo Tumi Aleya
- "Boro Eka Eka Laage" film Deep Nebhe Nai (1968)
- "Premer Naam Bedona" film Neel Akasher Niche (1968)
- "Ki Anondo Diye" film Joar Bhata (1969) (with Sabina Yasmin)
- "Tumi Amay Bhalobasho" film Agontuk (1969)
- "Ami Je Kebol Bolei Choli" film Agontuk (1969) (with Shahnaz Begum)
- "Ei Sopnoghera Din Rakhbo Dhore" film Dorpochurno (1970) (with Kabori)
- "Tumi Je Amar Kobita" film Dorpochurno (1970) (with Sabina Yasmin)
- "O Meyer Naam Debo Ki" film Sorolipi (1970)
- "Ganeri Khatay Sorolipi Likhe" film Sorolipi (1970)
- "Ami To Aaj Bhule Gechhi" film The Rain (1976)
- "Tum Hi To Ho" film The Rain (1976)
- "Ke Jeno Aaj Amar Chokhe"

== Film songs ==
Year	Film	Song	Composer(s)	Songwriter(s)	Co-artist(s)
1967	Agun Niye Khela	"Ekti Pakhi Dupure"	Altaf Mahmud	N/A	Sabina Yasmin
1967	Chaowa Paowa	"Kichhu Aage Hole Khoti Ki Chhilo"	Satya Saha	Mohammad Moniruzzaman	Ferdousi Rahman
1969	Agantuk	"Ami Je Kebol Bolei Choli"	Azad Rahman	Dr. Abu Haider Sajedur Rahman	Mahmudun Nabi
1969	Shesh Porjonto	"Amar Sarati Jibon Shudhu Tomar"	Abdul Latif		solo
1970	Deep Nebhe Nai	"Boro Eka Eka Eka Lage"	Satya Saha	Gazi Mazharul Anwar	solo
1970	Ekoi Ange Eto Roop	"Ki Jaadu Achhe Tomar Oi Chokhe"	Ali Hossain	Mohammad Moniruzzaman	solo
1970	Je Agune Puri	"Ke Jeno Aaj Amar Chokhe"	Khandaker Nurul Alam	Gazi Mazharul Anwar	solo
1970	Jibon Theke Neya	"O Amar Shopno Jhora"	Khan Ataur Rahman	Khan Ataur Rahman	Abdul Jabbar, Sabina Yasmin, Khandaker Faruk Ahmed, Nilufar Yasmin
1970	Jibon Theke Neya	"Amar Shonar Bangla"	Khan Ataur Rahman	Khan Ataur Rahman	Ajit Roy, Sabina Yasmin, Nilufar Yasmin
1970	Swaralipi	"Ganeri Khatay Swaralipi Likhe" (male)	Subal Das	Gazi Mazharul Anwar	solo
1970	Taka Ana Pai	"Baba Shubhongkor, E Ki Bhoyonkor"	Altaf Mahmud	Zahir Raihan	solo
1970	Taka Ana Pai	"Ore Chol Ponkiraj Ure Chol"	Altaf Mahmud	Zahir Raihan	solo
1972	Bahram Badshah	N/A		Gazi Mazharul Anwar, M A Kashem, Osman Khan	solo
1973	Priyotoma	"Tumi Amar Shilpi Moner"	Azad Rahman	Mostafizur Rahman, Pranab Roy	Sabina Yasmin
1975	Jibon Niye Jua	"Gaane Gaane Jorale Bondhu"	Ali Hossain	Kazi Abu Zafar Siddiqui	Sabina Yasmin
1976	Mauar Badhon	"Heera Amar Kanch Kata Heera"	Azad Rahman	Ahmed Zaman Chowdhury	Sabina Yasmin
1976	Mauar Badhon	"Mon Jodi Lukiye Rakho"	Azad Rahman	Ahmed Zaman Chowdhury	Selina Azad
1976	The Rain	"Ami Toh Aaj Bhule Gechhi Sobi"	Anwar Parvez	Gazi Mazharul Anwar	solo
1977	Kuasha	"Bondhu Amay Rekho Shudhu"	Azad Rahman	Gazi Mazharul Anwar, Jebunnisa Jamal, Ahmed Zaman Chowdhury	Shahnaz Rahmatullah
1977	Pinjor	"Ke Amay Alor Thikana Bole Debe"	Khandaker Nurul Alam	Akhtaruzzaman	solo
1978	Megher Por Megh	"Jani Kobitar Cheye Tumi Sundortomo"	Raja Shyam	Gazi Mazharul Anwar	solo
1978	Modhumita	"Ogo Mor Modhumita" (male)	Satya Saha	Gazi Mazharul Anwar, M N Akhtar	solo
1986	Dui Noyon	"Ekti Chheler Laglo Bhalo"	Azad Rahman	Azad Rahman	Sabina Yasmin
N/A	Mayadore Bandha	"Bhiru Mon Aaj Sejechhe"			Sabina Yasmin

=== Non-film songs ===
Year	Film	Song	Composer(s)	Songwriter(s)	Co-artist(s)
N/A	Single	"Tomar Premer Modhumoy Surobhite"	Khandaker Nurul Alam	Mohammad Moniruzzaman	solo
N/A	Single	"Amay Chine Rakho"			solo

== Personal life ==
Mahmud had three daughters Fahmida Nabi (born 4 January 1964), Tanzida Nabi and Samina Chowdhury (born 28 August 1966) and one son Ridwan Nabi Pancham. He died on 20 December 1990 and is buried in the Mohammadpur Graveyard at Taj Mahal Road, Mohammadpur, Dhaka.
