= Judge Barrister Police Commissioner =

Bangladeshi film

- Judge Barrister Police Commissioner Poster
- Directed by: F I Manik
- Story by: Delwar Jahan Jhantu; Mohammad Rafiquzzaman (dialogue)
- Produced by: F I Manik
- Starring: Shakib Khan; Purnima; Razzak; Sohel Rana; Alamgir
- Cinematography: Mostafa Kamal
- Music by: Alauddin Ali
- Distributed by: Fim Films Int.
- Release date: 10 May 2013
- Country: Bangladesh
- Language: Bengali

Judge Barrister Police Commissioner (Bengali: জজ ব্যারিস্টার পুলিশ কমিশনার) is a Dhallywood Bengali film directed and produced by F I Manik. The film features an ensemble cast of Shakib Khan, Razzak, Alamgir, Sohel Rana and Purnima in the lead roles. The film was released on 10 May 2013.

== Cast ==
- Shakib Khan as Sagor/ Victor
- Purnima as Nilima Rahat Khan
- Razzak as Judge Asad
- Alamgir
- Sohel Rana as Police commissioner Rahat Khan
- Suchorita as Keya, Asad's wife
- Misha Sawdagor
- Sadek Bachchu
- Ahmed Sharif
- Suchorita
- Rehana Jolly
- Shiba Shanu

== Production ==
The production of the movie was started in 2011. The movie was expected to hit screens in 2012, but due to some financial and casting problems, it failed to do so.

== Soundtrack ==
The soundtrack of Judge Barrister Police Commissioner was composed by Alauddin Ali, and lyrics were penned by Gazi Mazarul Anwar, Munshi Wadud, and Kabir Bakul. Andrew Kishore, Sabina Yasmin, Kanak Chapa, S.I. Tutul, Saiful Islam, Monir Khan and Biplob sang for this film.

=== Track listing ===
No.	Title	{{{extra_column}}}	Length
1.	"Kiser Avishap"	Andrew Kishore & Sabina Yasmin
2.	"Valobasha Fire Alo"	Saiful Islam & Sabina Yasmin
3.	"Donia Jar Hater Mutho"	Biplop
4.	"Ke Tumi"	S.I. Tutul and Sabina Yasmin
5.	"Ore Chok Keno Kadhe"	Monir Khan
6.	"Toke sui"	S.I. Tutul, Andrew Kishore & Sabina Yasmin

== See also ==
- Cinema of Bangladesh
- List of Bangladeshi films of 2013
