= Sujata (actress) =

Bangladeshi actor

- সুজাতা
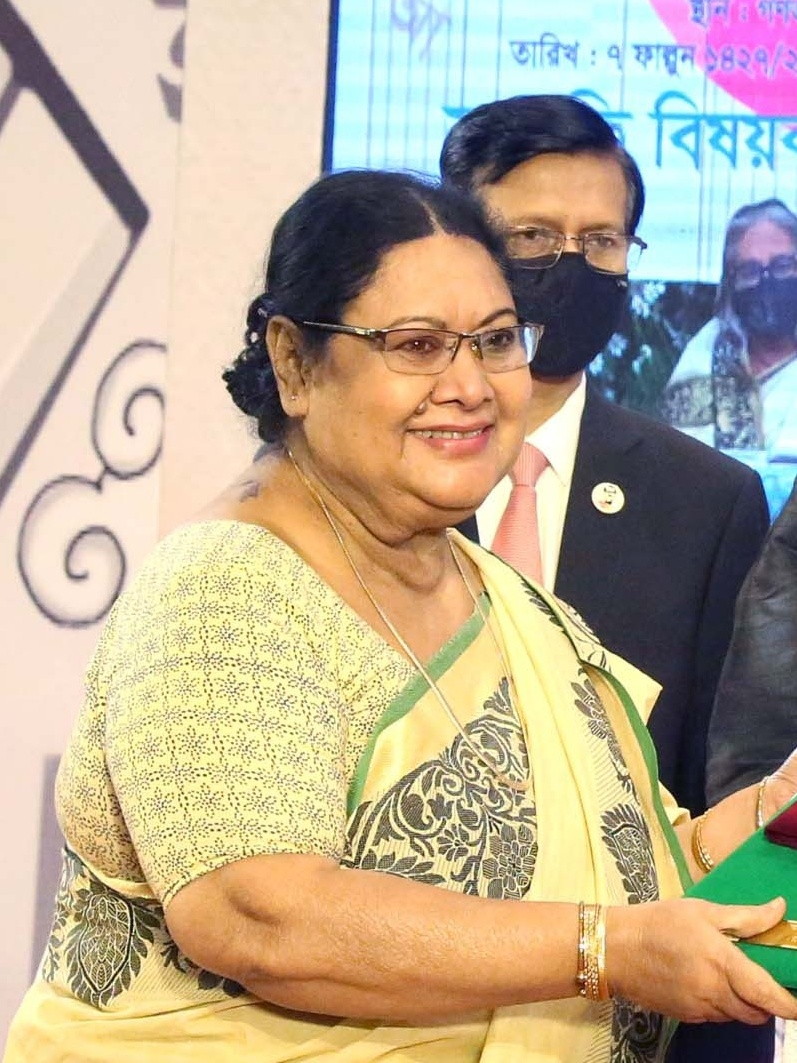
- Sujata in 2021
- Born: Tandra Majumder; 10 August 1947 (age 79); Kushtia, East Pakistan, Pakistan
- Other name: Salma Begum Sujata
- Occupation: Actress
- Spouse: Azim (m. 1967; died 2003)

Salma Begum Sujata (born Tandra Majumder), known mononymously as Sujata, is a retired Bangladeshi film actress. She is best known for her role in Rupban (1965) as Rupban Konna. She was awarded Bangladesh National Film Award for Lifetime Achievement in 2017 and Ekushey Padak in 2021.

== Career ==
Sujata debuted in acting through the film Rupban in 1965.

== Personal life ==
Sujata married actor Azim on 30 June 1967. She was born a Hindu and converted to Islam.

== Works ==
- Dharapat (1963) Her first film
- Rupban (1965)
- 13 Number Feku Ostagar Lane (1966)
- Aina Obo Shishta (1966)
- Dak Babu (1966)
- Parwana (1966)
- Rahim Badshah O Rupban (1966)
- Raja Sanyasi (1966)
- Zarina Sundri (1966)
- Agun Niye Khela (1967)
- Chote Saheb (1967)
- Main Bhi Insan Hon (1967)
- Aban Chhita (1968)
- Eto Tuku Asha (1968)
- Chena Achena (1968)
- Kanchen Mala (1968)
- Madho Mala (1968)
- Quli (1968)
- Rakhan Bandhu (1968)
- Roopban Roopkatha (1968)
- Ali Baba (1969)
- Alor Pipasha (1969)
- Bedarmie (1969)
- Ghazi Kalu (1969)
- Mere Arman Mere Sapne (1969)
- Momeir Alo (1969)
- Saiful Maluk (1969)
- Swarna Kamal (1969)
- Aparjeo (1970)
- Surja Uther Agey (1970)
- Osru Diye Lekha (1972)
- Alor Michil (1974)
- Chhutir Ghonta (1980)
- Hitman (2014)
- Ostitto (2016)
- Mon Diyechi Tare (2023)
- Rakkhosh (2026)
