= Gazi Mazharul Anwar =

Bangladeshi lyricist (1943–2022)

- গাজী মাজহারুল আনোয়ার
- Born: 22 February 1943; Taleshwar, Tipperah district, Bengal Presidency
- Died: 4 September 2022 (aged 79)
- Occupations: Music director, lyricist, screenwriter, film producer and director
- Years active: 1964–2022
- Children: 2
- Awards: list of awards

Gazi Mazharul Anwar (22 February 1943 – 4 September 2022) was a Bangladeshi film director, producer, lyricist, screenwriter and music director. He earned the Bangladesh National Film Award for Best Lyricist a record seven times for the films Tit for Tat (1992), Ajante (1996), Churiwala (2001), Lal Dariya (2002), Kokhono Megh Kokhono Brishti (2003), Meyeti Ekhon Kothay Jabe (2016) and Joiboti Konyar Mon (2021). He worked as a lyricist in the "Swadhin Bangla Betar Kendra". He was awarded Ekushey Padak in 2002 and Independence Day Award in 2021 by the government of Bangladesh. He has penned lyrics for 267 films.

== Career ==
=== 1960s ===
Gazi started his career as a lyricist at Radio Pakistan. The Bangladeshi film industry was born in 1956. Gazi started his career as a lyricist in the Dhallywood film industry in 1965. He wrote songs for Zahir Raihan's films, including Kacher Dewal (1965), Behula (1966), and Dui Bhai (1968). In 1968, Zahir asked him to pen seven songs for a film in two days. Gazi amazed Zahir by finishing in two hours. During this time, Gazi wrote screenplays for multiple films, including Urdu songs for Urdu-language films.

=== 1970s ===
In the 1970 film Jibon Theke Neya, Gazi wrote the songs. "E Khacha Bhangbo Ami", sung by Khan Ataur Rahman, became a hit. "Eki Sonar Aloy", sung by Sabina Yasmin, was another hit, whose popularity endures.

In 1971, the historic fight for Bangladesh's independence from Pakistan took place. Bangladeshi and Indian artists joined the movement through cultural protests. 'Swadhin Bangla Betar Kendra' was established for that purpose. Songs protesting Pakistani aggression and glorifying Bangladeshi freedom fighters' strength and contributions were penned by Anwar Parvez, Govind Haldar and Gazi Mazharul Anwar. He wrote the patriotic and popular songs "Ektara Tui Desher Kotha", and "Ekbar Jete Dena", first sung by Shahnaz Rahmatullah.

He wrote "Joy Bangla Banglar Joy", which became the theme song of Swadhin Bangla Betar Kendra. He also wrote "Amay Jodi Prosno Koro Kolokakolir Desh". "Joy Bangla" became the theme song for the Awami League. In 1972, he wrote the song "Shudhu Gaan Geye Porichoy" for the film Aponjon. In 1973, he wrote the popular "Monero Ronge Rangabo" for the film Masud Rana. In 1974, he wrote the hit song "Ganeri Khatay Sworolipi Likhe", sung by Runa Laila. It was her first Bangla song and established her as a household name. In 1974, he wrote songs for the patriotic film Alor Michil. Its songs, such as "Dukkho Korona" (sung by Abdul Jabbar) and "Ei Prithir Pore" (sung by Sabina Yasmin) remain popular. Other songs for Yasmin in the 1970s include "O Amar Rosiya Bondhure", "Ei Prithibir Pore", "Eki Sonar Aloy", "Monero Ronge Rangabo" and "Osru Diye Lekha".

=== 1980s ===
In 1982, he wrote lyrics for Rajnigandha, Ronger Manush, Bhat De and Desh Pardesh. For Rajnigandha, he wrote "Ami Rajanigandha Phuler Moto" (sung by Yasmin), a major hit. He wrote "Jeona Saathi" (sung by Yasmin) for Door Desh. The latter fetched a National Film Award for Andrew Kishore. Gazi's "Sobai To Bhalobasa Chai" (sung by Andrew Kishore) was a big hit. "Dhonyo Hoyechi Ami", "Koto Sadhonay Emon Bhagyo Mele", and "E Jibone Tumi Ogo Ele", all sung by Yasmin, were successful. In 1984, he wrote popular songs for Mahanayak. In 1986, he wrote "Ei Duniya Ekhon To Aar" (sung by Mitali Mukherjee) for Dui Poisar Alta, starring Shabana. Mukherjee earned a National Film Award for that song. He wrote the song "Akasher Hate Achhe Ekrash Nil", which made Shammi Aktar popular.

=== 1990s ===
In 1990, he directed the film Swadhin, based on a story from the liberation. In 1997, he wrote "Je Prem Swargo Theke" and "Tumi Amar Praner Cheye Priyo" for Praner Cheye Priyo. In 1999, he penned the songs for the film Biyer Phul, Ammajan, Madam Fuli, Ragi. Biyer Phul had the hit song "Tomay Dekhle Mone Hoy", sung by Kishore and Kanakchapa.

=== 2000-present ===
In 2002, he wrote songs for Premer Taj Mahal. The soundtrack album was quite successful. It contained the hit "Chhotto Ekta Jibon Niye". He received his fourth National Film Award for Best Lyricist for the film. In 2003, he wrote "Kichu Kichu Manusher Jibone" for Phul Nebo Na Osru Nebo. It was sung by Kishore and Kanak Chapa. In 2005, his song "Sukher Pakhi Re", which appeared in the film Dui Noyoner Alo, earned Yasmin a National Film Award for Best Female Playback Singer.

== Collaborations ==
He worked with almost every singer and music director of Dhallywood. He wrote songs for Shahnaz Rahmatullah, Syed Abdul Hadi, Sabina Yasmin and Runa laila. "Tondraha Noyono Amar", "Ektara Tui Desher Kotha", "Ekbar Jete Dena", "Ek Nodi Rokto Periye", "Sagorer Teer Theke", "Akasher hate ache ekrash nil" and "Chokher nozor emni koira ekdin khoiya jabe". He is best remembered for his collaborations with Yasmin. Her major hits came from her and included "Prem jeno mor godhuli belar Pantho pakhir kakoli", "Osru Diye Lekha", "Swojon Harano Diner", "Koto Sadhonay", "Jibon Amar Dhonyo Holo", "Ei Prithibir Pore", "O Amar Rosiya Bondhure", "Ei Mon Tomake Dilam", "Ami Rajanigandha Phuler Moto", "Tumi Je Amar Kobita", "Mohakal Seto Okul", "E Jibone Tumi Ogo Ele" and "Jeona Saathi". Other important collaborators included Runa Laila, Andrew Kishore, Kanak Chapa, Syed Abdul Hadi, Subir Nandi and Khurshid Alam.

His songs for Kishore included: "Ami Ekdin Tomay Na Dekhile", "Hayre Manush Rangin Phanush" and "Sobaito Bhalobasa Chai". He wrote most of Syed Abdul Hadi's. Gazi wrote "Chhotto Ekta Jibon Niye", "Akashe Chand Utheche", "Onek Sadhonar Pore", "Je Prem Swargo Theke", "Ki Chhile Amar" and other tracks for Kanak Chapa.

== Songs ==
A partial list of Mazharul Anwar's compositions include:

- Joy Bangla Banglar Joy
- Ek Nodi Rokto Periye
- Swajan Harano Diner Smarane
- Ektara Tui Desher Kotha
- Bondhu Tin Din Tor Barite Gelam
- Ekbar Jete De Na
- Akasher Haathe Achhe
- Achen Amar Muktar
- Bondhu Tor Barat Niya
- Chokher Nozor Emni Koira
- Ekbar Jete Dena
- Amay Jodi Prosno Koro Kolokakolir Desh
- Jodi Amake Dekhte Sadh Hoy
- Ei Prithibir Pore
- Prosno Koro Na
- Koto Sadhonay Emon Bhagyo Mele
- Jibon Amar Dhonyo Holo
- Hayre Hay Miss Lanka
- Ganeri Khatay Swarolipi Likhe
- Bazare Jachai Kore Dekhinito Daam
- Amar Buker Modhyekhane
- O Amar Roshiya Bondhure
- Ogo Chand Ora Bole
- Tandrahara Noyono Amar
- Sagorer Teer Theke
- Phuler Kane Bhromor Ese
- Osru Diye Lekha E Gaan
- Jokhon Thambe Kolahol
- Karo Apon Hoite Parli Na Antor
- Ei Mon Tomake Dilam
- Ei Duniya Ekhon To Aar
- Ami Rajangandha Phuler Moto
- Beder Meye Jyotsna
- Sobai To Bhalobasa Chay
- E Akashke Sakkhi Rekhe
- Chhotto Ekta Jibon Niye
- Kichu Kichu Manusher Jibone
- Akashe Chand Utheche
- Onek Sadhonar Pore Ami
- Tin Konya
- Aguner Din Sesh Hobe
- Tumi Amar Jibon
- Akashta Barachchhe Megh (2017)
- Tui Chul Kore De Elomelo (2018)

== Significant works ==
=== Lyricist ===
- Sutorang (1964)
- Kacher Dewal (1965)
- Behula (1966)
- Abirbhab (1968)
- Dui Bhai (1968)
- Momer Alo (1968)
- Rupbaner Rupotha (1968)
- Bijli (1969)
- Moynamoti (1969)
- Mukti (1969)
- Nil Akasher Niche (1969)
- Anka Banka (1970)
- Bablu (1970)
- Binimoy (1970)
- Boro Bou (1970)
- Deep Nebhe Nai (1970)
- Dheuer Por Dheu (1970)
- Dorpochurno (1970)
- Je Agune Puri (1970)
- Jibon Theke Neya (1970)
- Jog Biyog (1970)
- Ka Kha Ga Gha Umo (1970)
- Peech Dhala Poth (1970)
- Pita Putro (1970)
- Rong Bodlay (1970)
- Sadharon Meye (1970)
- Swaralipi (1970)
- Nacher Putul (1971)
- Shesh Raater Tara (1971)
- Smritituku Thak (1971)
- Abujh Mon (1972)
- Aponjon (1972)
- Chhondo Hariye Gelo (1972)
- Erao Manush (1972)
- Jibon Songeet (1972)
- Manusher Mon (1972)
- Nijere Haraye Khuji (1972)
- Ora Egaro Jon (1972)
- Swikriti (1972)
- Totas Ekti Nodir Naam (1972)
- Arunodoyer Ogni Sakkhi (1973)
- Atithi (1973)
- Dhire Bohe Meghna (1973)
- Masud Rana (1973)
- Shopno Diye Ghera (1973)
- Rangbazz (1973)
- Abar Tora Manush Ho (1974)
- Alor Michil (1974)
- Bichar (1974)
- Dui Porbo (1974)
- Shujon Sokhi (1974)
- Beiman (1974)
- Chokher Joley (1974)
- Porichoy (1974)
- Abhagi (1975)
- Alo Tumi Aleya (1975)
- Aponjon (1975)
- Chashir Meye (1975)
- Dhonyi Meye (1975)
- Hasi Kanna (1975)
- Lathiyal (1975)
- Shadhu Shoytan (1975)
- Badi Theke Golam (1975)
- Akangkha (1976)
- Anirban (1976)
- Bondini (1976)
- Cholo Ghor Bandhi (1976)
- Chondro Hariye Gelo (1976)
- Dushmon (1976)
- Gormil (1976)
- Jibon Sathi (1976)
- Kajol Rekha (1976)
- Ki Je Kori (1976)
- Noyon Moni (1976)
- O Bondhu (1976)
- Protinidhi (1976)
- Shomadhi (1976)
- The Rain (1976)
- Setu (1976)
- Shapmukti (1976)
- Surjo Grohon (1976)
- Aguner Alo (1977)
- Anonto Prem (1977)
- Ashami (1977)
- Ashikkhito (1977)
- Jononi (1977)
- Kuasha (1977)
- Moti Mohol (1977)
- Mustafiz (1977)
- Golapi Ekhon Traine (1978)
- Alankar (1978)
- Dumurer Phul (1978)
- Fakir Majnu Shah (1978)
- Megher Por Megh (1978)
- Toofan (1978)
- Bela Shesher Gaan (1979)
- Iman (1979)
- Jinjir (1979)
- Kar Pape (1979)
- Matir Ghar (1979)
- Priyo Bandhobi (1979)
- Sonar Horin (1979)
- Songini (1979)
- Surjo Songram (1979)
- The Father (1979)
- Abhijog (1980)
- Abirbhab (1980)
- Be Deen (1980)
- Bini Sutar Mala (1980)
- Simana Periye (1980)
- Emiler Goyenda Bahini (1980)
- Chhutir Ghonta (1980)
- Bhanga Gora (1981)
- Bondini (1981)
- Jhumka (1981)
- Mohanogor (1981)
- Shukhe Thako (1981)
- Sonar Tori (1981)
- Swami (1981)
- Darling (1982)
- Devdas (1982)
- Desh Pardesh (1982)
- Lal Kajol (1982)
- Manoshi (1982)
- Sohag Milon (1982)
- Soudagor (1982)
- Bhat De (1982)
- Dui Poysar Alta (1982)
- Nantu Ghotok (1982)
- Rajnigandha (1982)
- Andho Bodhu (1983)
- Banjaran (1983)
- Goli Theke Rajpoth (1983)
- Laili Mojnu (1983)
- Nazma (1983)
- Notun Bou (1983)
- Ondho Bodhu (1983)
- Prem Nogor (1983)
- Puroskar (1983)
- Abhijan (1984)
- Mahanayak (1984)
- Pension (1984)
- Roser Baidani (1984)
- Shasti (1984)
- Chor (1985)
- Maa O Chhele (1985)
- Phuleshwari (1985)
- Chapa Dangar Bou (1986)
- Dui Noyon (1986)
- Tin Konya (1986)
- Bicharpati (1986)
- Dhaka 86 (1986)
- Loraku (1986)
- Miss Lanka (1987)
- Rajlakshmi Shrikanto (1987)
- Shondhi (1987)
- Sohojatri (1987)
- Surrender (1987)
- Agomon (1988)
- Bheja Chokh (1988)
- Jogajog (1988)
- Shakkhor (1988)
- Zabardast (1988)
- Beder Meye Jyotsna (1989)
- Jinn Er Badshah (1989)
- Nawab Sirajuddaula (1989)
- Ranga Bhabi (1989)
- Shorto (1989)
- Chhutir Phande (1990)
- Swadhin (1990)
- Baap Beta 420 (1991)
- Beder Meye Jyotsna (1991)
- Phire Phire Asi (1991)
- Andho Biswas (1992)
- Dil (1992)
- Professor (1992)
- Shradhha (1992)
- Somor (1992)
- Sonia (1992)
- Abujh Sontan (1993)
- Bhoyongkor Saat Din (1993)
- Chandni Raate (1993)
- Mayer Dowa (1993)
- Moushumi (1993)
- Chokhe Chokhe (1994)
- Bikkhov (1994)
- Ek Poloke (1994)
- Khudha (1994)
- Sneho (1994)
- Sotiner Songsar (1994)
- Tumi Amar (1994)
- Asha Bhalobasha (1995)
- Banglar Nayok (1995)
- Denmohor (1995)
- Dost Amar Dushmon (1995)
- Lalu Sordar (1995)
- Lojja (1995)
- Satyer Mrityu Nei (1995)
- Sneha (1995)
- Ami Sei Meye (1996)
- Dipu Number Two (1996)
- Shopner Prithibi (1996)
- Andho Bhalobasha (1997)
- Coolie (1997)
- Hangar Nadi Grenade (1997)
- Bhondo (1997)
- Tiger (1997)
- Amma (1998)
- Dui Rongbaz (1998)
- Ei Mon Tomake Dilam (1998)
- Paradhin (1998)
- Swapner Nayok (1998)
- Ammajan (1999)
- Durdanto Dapot (1999)
- Jibon Chabi (1999)
- Laal Badshah (1999)
- Madam Fuli (1999)
- Ragi (1999)
- Tomar Jonyo Pagol (1999)
- Aaj Gaye Holud (2000)
- Hingsro Thaba (2000)
- Karishma (2000)
- O Priya Tumi Kothay (2000)
- Churiwala (2001)
- Itihas (2001)
- Bou Hobo (2002)
- Premer Tajmahal (2002)
- Hason Raja (2002)
- Lal Doriya (2002)
- Artonad (2002)
- Bou Shashurir Juddho (2003)
- Kheya Ghater Majhi (2003)
- Wrong Number (2004)
- Megher Opare Megh (2004)
- Char Sotiner Ghor (2005)
- Hajar Bachar Dhore (2005)
- Phuler Moto Bou (2005)
- Aayna (2006)
- Bidrohi Padma (2006)
- Dadima (2006)
- Hira Amar Naam (2006)
- Koti Takar Kabin (2006)
- Jiboner Golpo (2006)
- Na Bolona (2006)
- Ek Takar Bou (2007)
- Ei Je Duniya (2007)
- Shajghor (2006)
- Amar Jaan Amar Pran (2008)
- Aamader Chhoto Saheb (2008)
- Pashaner Prem (2008)
- Tumi Koto Sundor (2008)
- Shahed Name Golam (2009)
- Tumi Amar Swami (2009)
- Jibon Moroner Sathi (2010)
- Hridoy Bhanga Dheu (2011)
- Raja Surjo Kha (2012)
- Devdas (2013)
- Judge Barrister Police Commissioner (2013)
- Aposh Heen (2014)
- Lalchor (2015)
- Action Jasmine (2015)
- Meyeti Ekhon Kothay Jabe (2016)
- Pure Jay Mon (2016)
- Ekti Cinemar Golpo (2018)
- PoraMon 2 (2018)
- Joiboti Konyar Mon (2021)
- Rajsinghason
- Stree

=== Director ===
He has directed 19 films. His filmography as a director follows:

- Shasti (1984)
- Chor (1985)
- Bichar Poti (1986)
- Sondhi (1987)
- Shakkhor (1988)
- Sharto (1989)
- Swadhin (1990)
- Sroddha (1992)
- Samor (1992)
- Khudha (1994)
- Sneho (1995)
- Topashsha (1996)
- Amma (1998)
- Poradhin (1998)
- Raagi (1999)
- Artonad (2002)
- Jiboner Golpo (2006)
- Ei Je Duniya! (2007) and
- Pashaner Prem (2008)

=== Producer ===
Gazi has produced 23 films.

- Samadhan
- Agnishikha
- Somadhi
- Anurodh
- Jinjir
- Anar Koli
- Nantu Ghatak
- Shasti
- Chor
- Bicharpoti
- Sandhi
- Swadhin
- Sraddha
- Khudha
- Ulka
- Tapasha
- Amma
- Poradhin
- Ragi
- Artonad
- Jiboner Galpa
- Ei Je Duniya
- Pashaner Prem

== Legacy ==
Gazi Mazharul Anwar was unsurpassed as a Bangladeshi lyricist. He worked with music directors including Alam Khan, Sheikh Sadi Khan, Alauddin Ali, Samar Das, Satya Saha, Ahmed Imtiaz Bulbul and a later generation including Shawkat Ali Emon, Emon Saha and Ali Akram Shuvo.

He was among the lyricists of Swadhin Bangla Betar Kendra in 1971 alongside Apel Mahmud, Govind Haldar, Abdul Gaffar Chowdhury. He wrote the songs "Swajan Harano Diner Smarane", "Ektara Tui Desher Kotha", "Ek Nodi Rokto Periye" etc. These songs inspired the nation during the war. His songs elevated Sabina Yasmin, Runa Laila, Shahnaz Rahmatullah, Subir Nandi, Syed Abdul Hadi, Mahmudunnabi, Kanak Chapa, Andrew Kishore, Khalid Hasan Milu, Baby Nazneen and Monir Khan.

== Awards ==
- Bangladesh National Film Award for Best Lyrics (1992, 1996, 2001, 2002, 2003, 2016 & 2021)
- Ekushey Padak (2002)
- Independence Award (2021)
- President's gold medal for his contribution in the liberation war, by Sheikh Mujibur Rahman
- Zia Gold Medal (2002)
- Desh Netri Sansrkitik Padak for his contribution in culture.
- Dev Bhattacharya and SM Sultan Memorial Award in 1994.
- Comilla-Chandpur Brahmanbaria Award in 1995.
- SI DAB Award
- Dhaka Performing Arts Award
- Nattyashaba Award
- Purbani Chalaschitra Pathak Award
- Chitrali Pathak Award
- Comilla Foundation Award
- Jahir Raihan Chalaschitra Award
- Sequence Award
- Dhaka Bishwabiddalaya Shikkhai Alo Award
- Raza Hossain Khan Smriti Award
- Bangladesh Socio Cultural Center Award, and the Film Audience Award.

=== Lifetime achievement ===
Mazharul Anwar received several lifetime achievement awards including Cine Film Journalist Association Lifetime Achievement Award and CJFB Lifetime Achievement Award.

== Death ==
Gazi Mazharul Anwar died on the way to the United Hospital Limited at 7:55 am (UTC+6) on 4 September 2022.
