= Abdur Razzak (actor) =

Bangladeshi film actor and director (1942–2017)

Nayak Raj Abdur Razzak
- আব্দুর রাজ্জাক
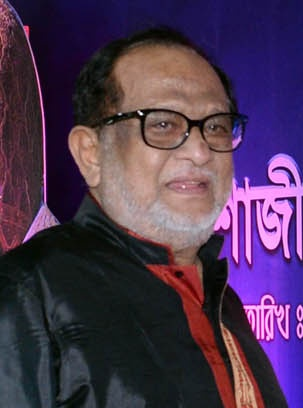
- Razzak in 2016
- Pronunciation: [abd̪uɾ razːak]
- Born: Mohammad Abdur Razzak; 23 January 1942; Calcutta, Bengal Province, British Raj (now Kolkata, West Bengal, India)
- Died: 21 August 2017 (aged 75); Dhaka, Bangladesh
- Occupations: Actor; producer; director
- Years active: 1960–2017
- Organization: Rajlokkhi Productions
- Spouse: Khairun Nesa Lokkhi (m. 1962)
- Children: 5, including Bapparaj
- Honours: Independence Award (2015)

Mohammad Abdur Razzak (Note: Bengali: আব্দুর রাজ্জাক, pronounced [abd̪uɾ razːak].) (Bengali: [abd̪uɾ razːak]; 23 January 1942 – 21 August 2017), known professionally as Razzak, (Note: Bengali: [razːak].) was a Bangladeshi actor, producer, and director who was predominantly worked in Dhallywood cinema. Widely regarded as one of the greatest and most successful actors in the history of Bangladeshi cinema, he was referred to in the media as "Nayak Raj", (Note: Bengali: [ˈnae̯ɔkɾad͡ʒ], lit. 'The King of Heroes'.) a term introduced by Ahmed Zaman Chowdhury, editor of the film magazine Chitrali.

His debut film as a producer was with the film Akankha (1976), directed by Subhash Dutta, and it was produced under his own production company, Rajlokkhi Productions. Razzak won the Bangladesh National Film Award for Best Actor five times for his roles in the films Ki Je Kori (1976), Ashikkhito (1978), Boro Bhalo Lok Chhilo (1982), Chandranath (1984), and Jogajog (1988). He was awarded the Independence Award in 2015 by the government of Bangladesh. He acted in more than 300 Bangladeshi and Indian Bengali and Urdu films, and also directed 16 films.

== Early life ==
Razzak was born in Naktala, South Kolkata. His parents, Akbar Hossain and Nisarunnesa, died at early ages. He joined the troupe Rongo Shobha Natya Dal, led by Chhabi Biswas. In 1961, he went to Mumbai to get a diploma at the Filmalaya Film Institute. The 1964 Calcutta riots made work difficult. That year, he moved to Dacca to try to break into the nascent East Pakistani film industry.

In Dhaka, Razzak found work at Abdul Jabbar Khan's Iqbal Films, and assisted in Kamal Khan's Ujala. He then worked in small roles in the films Akheri Station and Tero Nombor Feku Ostagor Lane.

== Career ==
In 1966, Zahir Raihan was looking for someone to play the lead role in his new film Behula. He chose Razzak, who was then serving as one of his assistants. Razzak went on to act in films including Abirbhab, Moynamoti, Taka Ana Pai, Dorpochurno, and Jibon Theke Neya (1970). After the 1971 Liberation War, he continued working on the films Manusher Mon, Ora Egaro Jon, and Osru Diye Lekha.

Razzak got his major breakthrough by acting in the action film Rongbaj (1974), directed by Zahirul Haq.

Razzak acted in leading roles with many prominent actors and actresses, including Anwar Hossain, Bulbul Ahmed, Sohel Rana, Ilias Kanchan, Shuchanda, Shabana, Bobita, Kabori, Sujata, Shabnam, and others. He appeared in a number of films opposite actress Shabana.

Razzak went on to make more than 300 appearances in Bengali and Urdu movies.

Razzak made his directorial debut in 1977 with the film Ononto Prem. He created his own production company, Rajlokkhi Productions. He went on to become the first Bangladeshi actor to be a UNFPA Goodwill Ambassador. He later founded the Bangladesh Film Artistes' Association.

He was given the Independence Day Award in 2015 by the Government of Bangladesh.

== Personal life ==
On 2 March 1962, Razzak married Khairun Nesa "Lokkhi" out of love. Together they had three sons, Bapparaj, Bappi, and Samrat, and two daughters, Nasrin Pasha and Afrin Alam.

== Death ==
He died on 21 August 2017 in Dhaka.

== Filmography ==
- All films are in Bangladeshi Bengali-language, unless otherwise noted.

Year	Title	Role	Notes	Ref.
1960	Ratan Lal Bangali	Pickpocket	Uncredited role; Indian Bengali film	
1961	Pankatilak	Student	Uncredited role; Indian Bengali film	
1961	Shilalipi	Himself	Uncredited role; Indian Bengali film	
1966	Kar Bou	Babytaxi driver	Uncredited role	
1966	Aakhri Station	Mushtaq	Supporting role; Pakistani Urdu film	
1966	13 Feku Ostagar Lane	Pintu	Supporting role	
1966	Kagojer Nouka	Drunk man	Uncredited role	
1966	Parwana	Himself	Uncredited role; Pakistani Urdu film	
1966	Daak Babu	Court Clark	Uncredited role	
1966	Behula	Lakhindar	Debut in as lead role	
1967	Oporajeo	Raja		
1967	Agun Niye Khela	Alamgir		
1967	Anwara	Nur Islam		
1967	Julekha	Yusuf		
1968	Dui Bhai	Jibon		
1968	Songsar	Badsha Talukder		
1968	Nishi Holo Bhor	Raj		
1968	Abirbhab	Rashed		
1968	Sokhina	Shawkat		
1968	Gori	Abdul	Pakistani Urdu film	
1968	Banshori	Manik		
1968	Etotuku Asha	Kabir		
1968	Shuorani Duorani	Shahzada		
1968	Kuchbaran Konna	Razzak		
1969	Moner Moto Bou	Jibon		
1969	Moina Moti	Moti		
1969	Agontuk	Babul		
1969	Shesh Porjonto	Sagar		
1969	Nil Akasher Niche	Mamun		
1969	Meherban	Milon	Pakistani Urdu film	
1970	Maina	Moti	Pakistani Urdu film	
1970	Je Agune Puri	Rahat		
1970	Shomapti	Manik		
1970	Payal	Chote Sarkar "Babu"	Pakistani Urdu film; Bengali version as Nupur	
1970	Ka Kha Ga Gha Umo	Montu		
1970	Akabaka	Raja		
1970	Jibon Theke Neya	Faruk		
1970	Pitch Dhala Path	Mohammad Khaled Ali		
1970	Jog Biyog	Raihan		
1970	Dorpochurno	Khokon		
1970	Choddo Beshi	Sujon		
1970	Shorolipi	Shafique Mahmud		
1970	Koto Je Minoti	Hasan Chowdhury		
1970	Modhu Milon	Milon		
1970	Odhikar	Monir		
1970	Dheu Er Pore Dheu	Forid / Babar		
1970	Pita Putro	Raja		(Note: Pita Putro 1970 film directed by Amjad Hossain and it is starring Abdur Razzak and Kabori Sarwar)
1970	Taka Ana Pai	Shahid		
1970	Kaach Kata Hirey	Hafiz		
1970	Deep Nebhe Nai			
1970	Boro Bou			(Note: Boro Bou 1970 film directed by Nurul Haque Bachchu and it is starring Abdur Razzak and Sujata)
1971	Nacher Putul	Firoz		
1971	Sritituku Thak	Robi		
1971	Gayer Bodhu			
1972	Protishodh	Kamal Hossain Chowdhury / Amar Singh Chowdhury		
1972	Manusher Mon	Monowar Hossain Chowdhury "Mono"		
1972	Ora Egaro Jon	Parvez		
1972	Abujh Mon	Masum		
1972	Chowdhury Bari			
1972	Jibon Sangeet	Milon		
1972	Osru Diye Lekha	Asad Chowdhury		
1972	Komol Ranir Dighi			
1972	Shapath Nilam	Raju		
1972	Chhondo Hariye Gelo	Manik		
1972	Erao Manush			
1973	Priyotoma			
1973	Slogan			
1973	Ke Tumi			
1973	Jhorer Pakhi	Selim Chowdhury		
1973	Ekhane Akash Nil			
1973	Amar Jonmobhumi			
1973	Otithi			
1973	Sonali Akash	Mohit		
1973	Swapno Diye Ghera	Sharif		
1973	Rangbaaz	Raja		
1973	Khelaghar			
1974	Abak Prithibi			
1974	Alor Michil	Rana		
1974	Beiman			
1974	Chokher Jole			
1974	Vul Jokhon Bhanglo			
1974	Badi Theke Begum			
1974	Masud Rana	Club singer	Special appearance	
1974	Triratna	Bidyut		
1974	Porichoy			
1975	Onek Prem Onek Jala			
1975	Aponjon			
1975	Alo Tumi Aleya			
1975	Bandi Theke Begum	Ali Nawsher		
1975	Daak Peon			
1975	Shadu Soytan			
1975	Ovagi			
1976	Shetu			
1976	Mayar Badhon			
1976	Anirban			
1976	Akankha		Debut as producer	
1976	Gunda	Bahadur		
1976	Agun			
1976	Ki Je Kori	Badshah	Won — National Film Award for Best Actor	
1976	Somadhi			
1977	Ashadharan			
1977	Ononto Prem		Also director and producer	
1977	Jadur Bashi	Mohor Ali		
1977	Moti Mahal	Imran / Shamsher Daku		
1977	Amor Prem			
1978	Bajimaat			
1978	Pagla Raja			
1978	Bondhu			
1978	Ashikkhito	Rahmat	Won — Bangladesh National Film Award for Best Actor	
1978	Angaar	Chanchal		
1978	Alankar	Mamunur Rahman		
1978	Agnishikha			
1978	Ashami			
1978	Shohag			
1979	Anuraag			
1979	Sonar Horin			
1979	Matir Ghar	Alauddin		
1979	Jinjir	Rajon / Bandit Farhad		
1979	Ami Ratan		Indian Bengali film	
1979	Badla	Raju		
1980	Chhutir Ghonta	Abbas Mia		
1980	Sokhi Tumi Kar			
1980	Danpite Chhele			
1980	Anarkali	Shahzada Selim		
1981	Putrobodhu			
1981	Nagin			
1981	Ghoroni			
1981	Mouchor		Also director and producer	
1981	Mohanagar	Heera		
1981	Bhanga Ghora			
1981	Allah Meherbaan			
1981	Shukhe Thako			
1982	Kajol Lata			
1982	Ashar Alo			
1982	Naat Bou	Tarun		
1982	Rajanigandha	Wahid Malik Topon		
1982	Dui Poisar Alta			
1982	Boro Bhalo Lok Chhilo	Yasin	Won — National Film Award for Best Actor	
1983	Kalo Golap			
1983	Badnam		Also director and producer	
1983	Laily Majnu	Kayes Amri / Majnu		
1983	Nazma	Nadim Rahman		
1983	Lalu Bhulu	Bhulu		
1984	Talaq			
1984	Mayer Achol			
1984	Notun Prithibi	Jibon		
1984	Chandranath	Chandranath	Won — National Film Award for Best Actor	
1984	Abhijan	Raju	Also director and producer	
1985	Shona Bou			
1985	Shot Bhai		Also director and producer	
1985	Kabin			
1985	Awara	Kanchan		
1986	Tauba			
1986	Shuvoda	Sadanando		
1987	Swami Stree	Salauddin Badshah		
1987	Sondhi	Monu Miah / L Chowdhury		
1987	Rajlakshmi Srikanta	Kumar Bahadur	Special appearance	
1988	Nitiban			
1988	Kusumpurer Kodom Ali	Kodom Ali		
1988	Jogajog	Shahed Chowdhury	Won — National Film Award for Best Actor	
1988	Dhaka 86			
1988	Orpon			
1988	Asroy			
1988	Agni Konna			
1988	Agomon	Shaker		
1988	Shakkhor	Biplob Ali Miah		
1988	Jamana			
1989	Bidhata			
1989	Raja Mistri	Raja	Also as producer	
1989	Ram Rahim John	Rahim		
1989	Durnam	Shaker		
1989	Biroho Byatha			
1990	Shadhin	SP Shajjad Hossain		
1990	Prayashchitto			
1990	Mala Moti	Moti		
1991	Shomman			
1991	Adorer Bon			
1991	Shopno			
1992	Darbare Khaja			
1992	Ondho Biswas	Mr. Raja / Raju		
1992	Professor	Professor Kabir	Also director and producer	
1992	Dongshon	Rajan		
1992	Somor			
1992	Sroddha			
1992	Jonmodata			
1993	Prem Shokti	Rashed	Also director and producer	
1993	Mister Mawla			
1993	Jonom Dokhi			
1994	Sotiner Songsar			
1994	Sobar Upore Ma			
1996	Bazigor			(Note: Bazigor 1996 film directed by Hafiz Uddin and it is starring Helal Khan, Shabnur and Abdur Razzak)
1997	Uttor Falguni		Also screenplay writer and director	
1997	Judge Shaheb			
1997	Baba Keno Chakor	Rakib Ahmed	Also director, producer and screenplay writer	
1998	Prithibi Tomar Amar			
1998	Shanto Keno Mastan			
1998	Sesh Prothikkha			
1998	Baba Keno Chakar	Rajnarayan Babu	Indian Bengali film; remake of 1997 his own same name film	
1999	Shontan Jokhon Sotru		Also director and producer	
1999	Hridoye Lekha Nam			
1999	Ragi			
1999	Santan Jakhan Satru		Indian Bengali film; remake of 1999 his own same name film	
2000	Baba Keno Ashami			
2000	Jibon Chabi			
2000	Janer Jaan			
2000	Gunda Number One			
2000	Kukkhato Khuni	Aminul Haque		
2001	Kothin Bastob			
2001	Moron Niye Khela	Inspector Rashed Chowdhury	Also director and producer	
2001	Bap Betir Juddho			
2001	Imandar Mastan			
2002	Dhakaiya Mastan			
2002	Lal Doriya	Doriya's father		
2002	Samaj Ke Bodle Dao			
2002	Major Saheb			
2002	Ashanto Agun			
2002	Shami Strir Juddho			
2002	Arman			
2002	Aghat Palta Aghat			
2002	Mayer Jihad			
2002	Annadata	Amar Chowdhury	Indian Bengali film	
2002	Kurukshetra	Raj Shekhar Chowdhury	Indian Bengali film	
2003	Kokhono Megh Kokhono Brishti	Nodi's brother		
2003	Top Shomrat			
2003	Badshah Keno Chakor			
2004	Bap Betar Lorai			
2004	Ram Laxman	Subhankar Sanyal	Indian Bengali film	
2004	Devdoot		Indian Bengali film	
2004	Amader Shontan			
2006	Pitar Ashon			
2006	Nayak The Real Hero	Janardhan	Indian Bengali film	
2006	Hero	Head constable Bhabani Shankar Roy	Indian Bengali film	
2006	Koti Takar Kabin	Aslam Shikdar		
2006	Sarthopar		Indian Bengali film	
2006	Eri Naam Prem		Indian Bengali film	
2006	Agni Pariksha		Indian Bengali film	
2007	Ei Je Duniya			
2007	Ami Bachte Chai		Also director, screenplay writer and producer	
2007	Jiboner Cheyeo Dami	Raihan Chowdhury		
2008	Eroi Naam Bhalobasha			
2008	Janmadata	Bhavani Chowdhury	Indian Bengali film	
2008	Maa Babar Shopno			
2008	Babar Jonno Juddho			
2008	Biyer Prostab			
2008	Ek Takar Bou			
2008	Pitamatar Amanat			
2008	Koti Takar Fokir	Fokir	Also director, screenplay writer and producer	
2008	Jamidarer Meye			
2008	Mone Prane Acho Tumi	Anam		
2008	Mayer Moto Bhabi			
2008	Akash Chhoa Bhalobasa	Mir Amzad Ali		
2008	Tomake Bou Banabo			
2009	Tumi Amar Swami	Shamsher Chowdhury		
2009	Miya Barir Chakor			
2009	Biye Bari			
2009	Ma Boro Na Bou Boro			
2009	Sobai To Bhalobasha Chay			
2009	Bhalobashar Shesh Nei			
2009	Mon Diyechi Tomake		Also director, screenplay writer and producer	
2009	Piritir Agun Jole Digun			
2010	Chachchu Amar Chachchu	Rafique Mallick		
2010	Rikshawalar Chele			
2010	Bap Boro Na Shashur Boro			
2010	Panch Takar Prem			
2011	Hridoy Bhanga Dheu			
2012	Most Welcome			
2012	Bhalobasar Rong	Shamsuddin Chowdhury		
2013	Ayna Kahini	Himself	Special appearance; also as director	
2013	Purno Doirgho Prem Kahini	Samad Shikdar		
2013	Nishwartha Bhalobasa	Hayder		
2013	Judge Barrister Police Commissioner	Judge Asad Chowdhury		
2013	Onnorokom Bhalobasha	Karim Chowdhury		
2014	Ek Cup Cha	College Principal	Special appearance	
2014	Akash Koto Dure	Bichchu's grandfather		
2015	Kartooz	Asad Chowdhury	Also as producer	
2016	Mon Janena Moner Thikana	Judge Shaheb		

=== Television drama ===
Year	Name	Role	Notes	Ref.
1964	Ghoroa	Rajaa	Urdu drama serial on Pakistan Television	
2004	Sritisotta	Aziz Mandol	Released on BTV	
2012	Biday Store	Karim	Released on BTV	
2015	Mahesh	Gafur	Released on Channel i; also as director and producer	
2016	Chairmaner Choritro Fuler Moto Pobitro	Chairman	Released on Channel i; also as producer	

=== Other credits ===
Year	Title	Director	Producer	Screenplay	Notes	Ref.
1966	Ujala	—N/a	—N/a	—N/a	Urdu film; as assistant director	
1966	Parwana	—N/a	—N/a	—N/a	Urdu film; as assistant director	
1976	Akankha	No	Yes	No	Debut in as producer	
1977	Ononto Prem	Yes	Yes	No	Debut in as director	
1981	Mouchor	Yes	Yes	No		
1983	Badnam	Yes	Yes	No		
1985	Shot Bhai	Yes	Yes	No		
1984	Abhijan	Yes	Yes	No		
1986	Chapa Dangar Bou	Yes	Yes	Yes	No casting	
1988	Raja Mistri	No	Yes	No		
1990	Jiner Badshah	Yes	Yes	Yes	No casting	
1992	Professor	Yes	Yes	No		
1993	Prem Shakti	Yes	Yes	No		
1997	Uttor Falguni	Yes	No	Yes		
1997	Baba Keno Chakor	Yes	Yes	Yes		
1999	Shontan Jokhon Sotru	Yes	Yes	Yes		
2000	Premer Nam Bedona	Yes	Yes	Yes	No casting	
2001	Moron Niye Khela	Yes	Yes	No		
2007	Ami Bachte Chai	Yes	Yes	Yes		
2008	Koti Takar Fokir	Yes	Yes	Yes		
2009	Mon Diyechi Tomake	Yes	Yes	Yes		
2013	Ayna Kahini	Yes	No	No		
2015	Kartooz	No	Yes	No		
2015	Mahesh	Yes	Yes	No	Television drama on Channel i	
2016	Chairmaner Choritro Fuler Moto Pobitro	No	Yes	No	Television drama on Channel i	

== Awards and achievements ==
=== Film ===
Year	Award	Category	Film	Result
1976	National Film Awards	Best Actor	Ki Je Kori	Won
1978	National Film Awards	Best Actor	Ashikkhito	Won
1982	National Film Awards	Best Actor	Boro Bhalo Lok Chhilo	Won
1984	National Film Awards	Best Actor	Chandranath	Won
1988	National Film Awards	Best Actor	Jogajog	Won

=== Other ===
Year	Award	Category	Result
2003	Indo-Bangla Kala Music Award	Khan Ataur Rahman Lifetime Achievement Award	Won
2009	Bachsas Awards	Life Time Achievement	Won
2012	Ifad Film Club Award	Life Time Achievement	Won
2012	Babisas Award	Life Time Achievement	Won
2014	Meril Prothom Alo Awards	Life Time Achievement	Won
2017	Tele Cine Awards in Kolkata	Life Time Achievement	Won
