= Dhire Bohe Meghna =

- theatrical release poster
- Directed by: Alamgir Kabir
- Screenplay by: Alamgir Kabir
- Story by: Alamgir Kabir
- Produced by: Bangladesh Films International
- Starring: Bobita; Hasu Banerjee; Ajmal Huda; Golam Mustafa; Anwar Hossain; Khalil Ullah Khan
- Cinematography: Arun Roy; M A Mobin; Komal Nayek
- Edited by: Debobrato Sen Gupta
- Music by: Satya Saha
- Distributed by: Star Film Distribution
- Release date: 1973
- Running time: 109 Minutes
- Country: Bangladesh
- Language: Bengali

Dhire Bohe Meghna (Bengali: ধীরে বহে মেঘনা; Literary Meaning Quiet Flows the Meghna) is a 1973 Bengali war film based on the events of the Bangladesh Liberation War. The film was written and directed by Alamgir Kabir. It was his first feature film.

== Background ==
Initially Zahir Raihan was the original planner of the movie Dhire Bohe Meghna.

== Plot ==
A Delhi girl comes to her aunt's house, where she hears the reality of Bangladesh's independent story.

== Cast ==
- Bobita
- Hasu Banerjee
- Ajmal Huda
- Golam Mustafa
- Anwar Hossain
- Khalil Ullah Khan

== Music ==
The film's song was written by Mohammad Monirujjaman, composed by Samar Das and background music by Sataya Saha. Hemanta Mukherjee and Sandhya Mukhopadhyay gave voice for the two songs.

No.	Title	Singer	Length
1.	"Kato je dhire bohe Megna (কতো যে ধীরে বহে মেঘনা)"	Hemanta Mukherjee
2.	"Ore aai ghore aai (ওরে আয় ঘরে আয়)"	Sandhya Mukhopadhyay

== Reception ==
In 2002, the British Film Institute's list of South Asian films, ranked Dhire Bohe Meghna eighth among the top 10 ranked movies.
