= Mohammad Ali Siddiqui =

Bangladeshi singer (1944–2014)

- Born: 2 February 1944; Netrokona, Bengal Presidency, British India
- Died: 4 November 2014 (aged 70); Mirpur, Dhaka, Bangladesh
- Occupation: playback singer

Mohammad Ali Siddiqui (2 February 1944 – 4 November 2014) was a Bangladeshi playback singer. He was a singer in the 1960s, 1970s and 1980s. He has sung a total of 250 songs in his career spanning over three decades. He was awarded with several prizes including the National Award, Dinesh Padak, Bandhan Lifetime Award and Shilpakala Academy Award.

== Discography ==
=== Film songs ===
Year	Film	Song	Composer(s)	Songwriter(s)	Co-artist(s)
1968	Chorabali	"Ranga Bhabir Bhanga Khate"	Satya Saha	Kazi Latif Haque	solo
1968	Chorabali	"Chanachur Enechhi Boro Mojadar"	Satya Saha	Kazi Latif Haque	solo
1969	Alingon	"Oi Meghla Boron Konya Chole"	Satya Saha	Syed Shamsul Haque	solo
1970	Chhoddobeshi	"Dekho Ami Aaj Peye Gechhi Kaj"	Satya Saha	Syed Shamsul Haque	solo
1970	Deep Nebhe Nai	"Oi Dur Dur Durante"	Satya Saha	Gazi Mazharul Anwar	solo
1970	Je Agune Puri	"Ei Bajare Thokale Je"	Khandaker Nurul Alam	Gazi Mazharul Anwar	Nazmul Huda
1970	Ka Kha Ga Gha Umo	"Amar Sadher Hawai Gari Chole Re"	Altaf Mahmud	Gazi Mazharul Anwar	solo
1970	Monimala	"Togbog Togbog Surer Akashe"	Amir Ali	Ali Baabi	Masuma Rahman
1970	Notun Probhat	"Mon Chhute Jai Ahare"	Satya Saha	Gazi Mazharul Anwar	solo
1972	Manusher Mon	"Ami Kotodin Koto Raat Bhebechhi"	Satya Saha	Gazi Mazharul Anwar	Sabina Yasmin
1972	Manusher Mon	"O Nagini, Nagini"	Satya Saha	Gazi Mazharul Anwar	Sabina Yasmin
1972	Manusher Mon	"Ei Shohore Ami Je Ek"	Satya Saha	Gazi Mazharul Anwar	solo
1973	Priyotoma	"Ogo Mor Priyotoma"	Azad Rahman	Mostafizur Rahman, Pranab Roy	solo
1974	Anek Din Aage	"Hoii Amar Teesmar Khan"	Subal Das	Masud Karim	Runa Laila
1975	Sadharon Meye	"Duniyata Gol Noy"	Satya Saha	Gazi Mazharul Anwar	solo
1975	Sadhu Shoytan	"Ei Mon Niye Khela Chole"	Raja Shyam	Gazi Mazharul Anwar	Sabina Yasmin
1975	Upohar	"Kaner Jhumkota Nile Go Chore"	Subal Das	Masud Karim	Sabina Yasmin
1977	Amar Prem	"Amar Achhe O Bhai Boot Palish"	Satya Saha	Gazi Mazharul Anwar	solo
N/A	Non-Film Single	"Tomake Manay Bhalo"	Mohammad Ali Siddiqui	Abdul Hai Al Hadi	solo
