= Deep Nebhe Nai =

Pakistani film

- Movie poster
- Directed by: Narayan Ghosh Mita
- Starring: Kabari; Razzak
- Music by: Satya Saha
- Release date: 1 November 1970
- Country: Pakistan
- Language: Bengali

Deep Nebhe Nai (English: The Lamp is Yet Kindled; Bengali: দীপ নেভে নাই) is a 1970 Pakistani film directed by Narayan Ghosh Mita and starring Razzak and Kabari.

== Cast ==
- Kabari
- Razzak

== Music ==
The film's music was composed by Satya Saha.
