= Alor Michil =

1974 film

- Alor Michil DVD Cover
- Directed by: Narayan Ghosh Mita
- Written by: Narayan Ghosh Mita
- Starring: Abdur Razzak; Bobita; Anwar Hossain
- Production company: Jhorna Pictures
- Release date: 25 January 1974 (Bangladesh)
- Running time: 130 minutes
- Language: Bengali

Alor Michil (Bengali: আলোর মিছিল; English translation: Procession of Light) is a 1974 Bangladeshi patriotic film which focuses on the independence movement of 1971. Written and directed by Narayan Ghosh Mita, it stars Abdur Razzak, Babita, Farooque and Anwar Hussain in lead roles. It was selected for preservation by the Bangladesh Film Archive.

== Plot ==
The film’s story revolves around a family in the post-Liberation War period. A low-salaried employee before the war attempts to become wealthy quickly through black market activities and hoarding in the aftermath of the conflict. His actions are not accepted by his wife, nor by his brother and friends who were freedom fighters. Protests against hoarders begin to spread across the community. In an attempt to suppress the protests, violence breaks out, and in a tragic turn of events, a beloved niece of the family is killed.

== Cast ==
- Abdur Razzak as Rana
- Farooque as Rashed
- Bobita as Alo
- Anwar Hossain as Shaheed Ashraf
- Rabiul Alam as Karim
- Hashmot as Alo’s dance teacher
- Sujata as Dina
- Khalil Ullah Khan as Alim
- Saifuddin as Alim’s secretary
- Rozi Afsary as Meena
- Narayan Chakraborty as Alo’s grandfather
- Inam Ahmed as Mr. Chowdhury

== Soundtrack ==
Alor Michil

Soundtrack album by Satya Saha

All lyrics are written by Mostafizur Rahman; all music is composed by Satya Saha while Khan Ataur Rahman composed the background score.

Songs
| No. | Title | Playback | Length |
|---|---|---|---|
| 1. | "Ei Prithibir Pore" | Sabina Yasmin |
| 2. | "Jaliye Dao" | Abdul Jabbar |
