= Ashikkhito =

1978 Bangladeshi film

- Poster
- Directed by: Azizur Rahman
- Starring: Anjana Sultana; Abdur Razzak
- Music by: Satya Saha
- Release date: 1978
- Country: Bangladesh
- Language: Bengali
- Box office: ৳4 crore (US$330,000)

Ashikkhito (English: Illiterate) (Bengali: অশিক্ষিত) is a 1978 Bangladeshi film directed by Azizur Rahman starring Abdur Razzak and Anjana Sultana opposite him. Razzak garnered Bangladesh National Film Award for Best Actor for his performance in the film. It bagged National Film Awards in two categories that year.

== Plot ==
An illiterate village watchman, Rahmat (Razzak) learns to read and write with the help of a poor orphan boy, Manik, who then got murdered by a corrupt local landlord when the boy witnesses a crime done by the landlord, leading Rahmat to use his newfound literacy to seek justice against the landlord though facing the boundaries of poverty.

== Cast ==
- Razzak as Rahmat
- Sumon as Manik
- Anjana Sultana as Laili
- Rosy Afsari as Manik's mother

== Music ==
The film's music was composed by Satya Saha.

Track No	Title	Singer(s)
1	"Oi Durer Akash"	Ramala Saha
2	"Ami Ek Paharadar"	Ferdous Wahid
3	"Master Saheb Ami Dastakhat"	Subir Nandi
4	"Dhaka Shahar Aisa Amar"	Shammi Akhtar and Khandaker Faruk Ahmed
5	"Ami Jemon Achi Temoni Robo"	Shammi Akhtar

== Awards ==
Bangladesh National Film Awards

- Best Actor – Abdur Razzak
- Best Supporting Actor – Sumon
