= A. T. M. Shamsuzzaman =

Bangladeshi actor (1941–2021)

- এ. টি.এম. শামসুজ্জামান
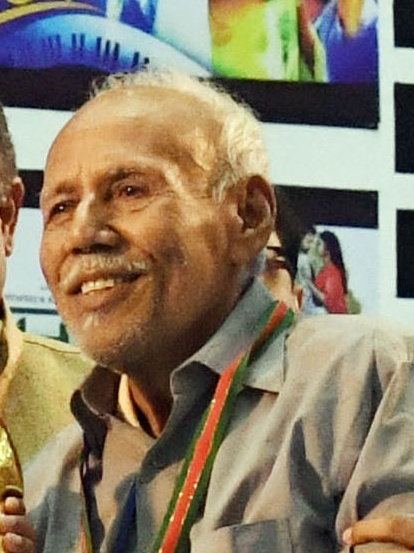
- Shamsuzzaman in 2019
- Born: Abu Taher Mohammad Shamsuzzaman; 10 September 1941; Ramganj, Bengal, British India
- Died: 20 February 2021 (aged 79); Dhaka, Bangladesh
- Occupations: Actor, producer, director, story writer and dramatist
- Children: 6

Abu Taher Mohammad Shamsuzzaman (Bengali: আবু তাহের মোহাম্মদ শামসুজ্জ়ামান; 10 September 1941 – 20 February 2021) was a Bangladeshi film and television actor, director, and screenwriter. He was awarded the Ekushey Padak in 2015 by the government of Bangladesh. He won Bangladesh National Film Awards five times for his roles in Dayee Ke? (1987), Madam Fuli (1999), Churiwala (2001), Mon Bosena Porar Table E (2009), and Chorabali (2012).

== Early life and career ==
Shamsuzzaman was born into a Bengali Muslim family at his maternal home in Daulatpur, Noakhali, on 10 September 1941. His ancestral paternal home is in Bholakot Boro Bari in Ramganj, Lakshmipur District. His father was Nuruzzaman, a wakil who worked with A. K. Fazlul Huq, and his mother was Nurunnisa Begum. Shamsuzzaman was the eldest child of a family of five brothers and three sisters. Growing up, he didn't plan on being an actor, he wanted to be a doctor.

His family moved to Dhaka and lived in Debendranath Das Lane in Old Dhaka. He began his schooling in Dhaka at Pogose School, where he was friends with Prabir Mitra, who would also grow up to be an actor. His film career began with filmmaker Udayan Chowdhury as an assistant director in the films "Manusher Bhagban" and "Bishwokanya". He got his breakthrough through his role in the film "Nayanmoni" (1976), directed by Amjad Hossain. Earlier he played the role of Ramzan in the play Sangsaptak, aired in 1960.

=== Controversy ===
According to a probe report of the "Nilima Ibrahim Committee", a six-member committee led by educationist Nilima Ibrahim, Shamsuzzaman was suspended from the television and radio programmes because of his alleged role in favor of the Pakistan army during the Bangladesh Liberation War in 1971. According to him; during the Liberation war the Pakistani Army forced him to attend a radio drama for which he was accused of an alleged role in favor of Pakistan.

== Personal life ==
Shamsuzzaman married Runy Begum on 15 March 1968. They had three sons and three daughters. On 13 March 2012, his younger son, A. T. M. Kholikuzzaman Kushol (1977–2023), murdered his older son, A. T. M. Kamaluzzaman Kabir (1975–2012). by stabbing him with a knife. A. T. M. Kamaluzzaman Kabir got into an argument and misbehaved with Shamsuzzaman, which is why A. T. M. Kholikuzzaman Kushol stabbed A. T. M. Kamaluzzaman Kabir. Shamsuzzaman Shamsuzzaman testified in court, and in 2014, Kushol was sentenced to life in prison. On 30 October 2023, ATM Kholikuzzaman was found dead in the Barishal Jayanti River.

== Filmography ==
Year	Title	Role	Notes	Ref.
1974	Sangram			
1976	Nayanmoni			
1979	Surja Dighal Bari			
1981	Bhalo Manush	Motindar		
1985	Annay Abichar			
1986	Chapa Dangar Bou	Setap Moral		
1987	Dayee Ke?		Bangladesh National Film Award for Best Actor	
1989	Ghor Bhanga Songshar			
1996	Unknowingly			
1996	Premer Somadhi			
1999	Tomar Jonno Pagol			
2002	Shoshurbari Zindabad			
2003	Adhiar	Nayeb		
2003	Jamai Shashur			
2004	Shasti			
2005	Amar Swapno Tumi			
2005	Hajar Bachhor Dhore			
2005	Molla Babrir Bou			
2008	Akkel Alir Nirbachon			
2009	Chander Moto Bou			
2009	Mon Boshena Porar Tebile			
2009	Ebadat		also director	
2010	Bishaash			
2011	Kusum Kusum Prem			
2011	Guerrilla			
2012	Chorabali		Bangladesh National Film Award for Best Supporting Actor	
2012	Lal Tip			

== Awards and nominations ==
- Ekushey Padak (2015)

Year	Awards	Category	Film	Result
1987	National Film Awards	Best Film Actor	Opekkha	Won
1999	National Film Awards	Best Comedy Actor	Madam Fuli	Won
2001	National Film Awards	Best Comedy Actor	Churiwala	Won
2009	National Film Awards	Best Comedy Actor	Mon Bosena Porar Table E	Won
2012	National Film Awards	Best Supporting Actor	Chorabali	Won
2018	National Film Awards	Special contribution in the film industry	—N/a	Won
2019	Bulbul Ahmed Memorial Award			Won

== Death ==
Shamsuzzaman died at his residence in Sutrapur neighborhood of Dhaka on 20 February 2021 at around 9 am. He had been suffering from various diseases due to old age for a long time.
