= Anwar Hossain (actor) =

Bangladeshi actor (1931–2013)

- আনোয়ার হোসেন
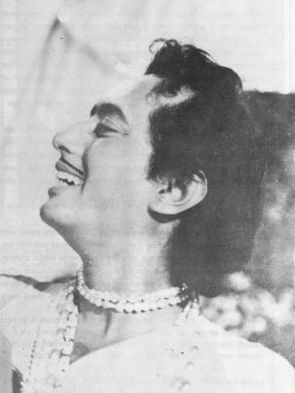
- Hossain in the film Nawab Sirajuddaula (film) (1967)
- Born: 6 November 1931; Jamalpur, Bengal Presidency, British India
- Died: 13 September 2013 (aged 81); Dhaka, Bangladesh
- Occupation: Actor Bangladeshi
- Awards: National Film Awards; Bachsas Awards

Anwar Hossain (6 November 1931 – 13 September 2013) was a Bangladeshi actor, best known for playing the role of Siraj ud-Daulah in the Bengali film Nawab Sirajuddaula (1967). He appeared in nearly 500 movies in his 50-year career. He is often referred as The Uncrowned Nawab of Bengali films. He received the Bangladesh National Film Award for Best Actor for his role in the film Lathial (1975) and Best Supporting Actor awards for the films again for Golapi Ekhon Traine (1978) and Dayi Ke? (1987).

== Early life ==
Hossain was born in Jamalpur, as the third child of Nazir Hossain and Shadiya Khatun.

== Career ==
Hossain started his film career through Tomar Amar, released in 1958. His notable Urdu language films include Nachghor, Bahana and Ujala. In 1965, Rupban brought him to fame, but he got his breakthrough with his lead role in Nawab Sirajuddaula in 1967.

== Filmography ==
- Tomar Amar (1961)
- Shurjo Snan (1962)
- Jowar Elo (1962)
- Kancher Deyal (1963)
- Dui Digonto (1964)
- Raja Sanyasi (1966)
- Nawab Sirajuddaula (1967)
- Etotuku Asha (1968)
- Alor Pipasha (1969)
- Ghazi Khalu (1969)
- Jina Bhi Munshkil (1969)
- Kangan (1969)
- Maina Moti (1969)
- Neel Akasher Neechey (1969)
- Pala Bodal (1969)
- Paroler Sansar (1969)
- Swarna Kamal (1969)
- Aparjeo (1970)
- Charro Beshi (1970)
- Jey Aguney Puri (1970)
- Jibon Theke Neya (1970)
- Jog Biyog (1970)
- Kokho Gocho (1970)
- Maina (1970)
- Nayeeka (1970)
- Lalon Fokir (1972)
- Orunodoyer Ognishakkhi (1972)
- Dhire Bohe Meghna (1973)
- Nayanmoni (1976)
- Palanka (1975)
- Rupali Shaikate (1977)
- Nagor Dola (1978)
- Golapi Ekhon Traine (1978)
- Shurjo Shongram (1979)
- Devdas (1982)
- Rajlokkhi Shrikanto (1987)
- Dayi Ke (1987)
- Shanti Oshanti (1992) as Rahman
- Dakat (1994) as Rahman
- Ranga Bou (1998)
- Sotter Mrittu Nei (1996)
- Jibon Chabi (1999)
- Ghani (2006)
- Rongbaj
- Alo Tumi Aleya
- Joy Bangla
- Nijere Haraye Khuji
- Poroshmoni

== Awards ==
National Film Awards

Year	Category	Film	Result
1975	Best Actor	Lathial	Won
1978	Best Supporting Actor	Golapi Ekhon Traine	Won
1987	Best Supporting Actor	Dayi Ke	Won
2010	Lifetime Achievement Award		Won

- Bangladesh Film Journalist Association Award (Bachsas Awards) in 1979
- Chalachitra Darshak Forum in 2006
- Channel-I Film Mela Award in 2009

== Death ==
Hossain was admitted to hospital in August 2013 for suspected gallstones. Doctors ruled surgery would be too invasive. Bangladeshi Prime Minister Sheikh Hasina visited him in hospital shortly before his death and issued his family with a cheque for one million Taka, equivalent to approximately eleven thousand US dollars. He died the following day, on 13 September 2013.
