= Satya Saha =

Satya Saha সত্য সাহা

Background information
- Born: 25 December 1934; Hathazari Upazila, Nandirhat, Chittagong, Bengal Presidency, British India
- Died: 27 January 1999 (aged 64) Dhaka, Bangladesh
- Genres: film score, techno, fusion, folk
- Occupations: Music director, composer, record producer
- Instruments: keyboards, vocals, guitar
- Years active: 1956–1997
- Labels: Sangeeta, Ektaar, Deadline music

Satya Saha (25 December 1934 – 27 January 1999) was a Bangladeshi composer and musician. His notable composed songs are "Chena Chena Lage" by Shyamal Mitra, "Dukkho Amar Basor Raater Palonko", "Chhiti Dio Protidin" by Sabina Yasmin, "Mon Bole Tumi Asbe", "Rupali Nadire", "Bondho Hote Cheye Tomar" by Subir Nandi, "Akasher Haate Ache" by Shammi Akhter, "Tumi Ki Dekhecho Kobhu" by Abdul Jabbar, "Oi Dur Digonte", "Mago Ma Ogo Ma" etc. He earned three Bangladesh National Film Awards in 1994, 1996, and 2001 in music director and composer categories. In 2013, he was awarded the Independence Day Award after his death. He was the father of musician Emon Saha and film director Sumon Saha.

== Early life ==
Satya Saha was born on 25 December 1934, into the zamindar family of Nandirhat at the Nandirhat Zamindar Bari, located in the Nandirhat area of Uttar Fateyabad under Hathazari Thana, Chattogram. Saha's father was Prasannakumar Saha. He started learning and rehearsing music from his uncle Rabindrapal Saha. He passed B.A. from Vidyasagar College in 1951–1952.

== Career ==
Saha began his career as a music director in 1955 with Subhash Dutta’s film Sutorang. He started his career as an assistant to composer Panchanon Mitra at Radio's Dhaka Station in 1956. From 1964 to 1999, he directed music in about two hundred different films and produced twenty films.

== Filmography ==
- Sutorang (1964)
- Janajani (1965)
- Rupban (1965)
- Fir Milebge Ham Duno (1966)
- Bhawal Sanyasi (1966)
- Kagazer Nouka (1966)
- Gunai Bibi (1966)
- 13 Number Feku Gostagar Lane (1966)
- Saiful Mulk Badiuzzaman
- Aina O Abashishta (1966)
- Aparichita
- Etotuku Asha (1968)
- Binimoy (1970)
- Dhire Bohe Meghna (1973)
- Alor Michil (1974)
- Nayanmoni (1976)
- Surjakonya (1976)
- Puroshkar (1980)
- Mohanogor (1981)
- Aguner Poroshmoni (1994)
- Ajante (1996)
- Dipu Number Two (1996)

== Awards ==
- Bachsas Awards – 1974
- Bangladesh National Film Awards (1994, 1996, 2001)
- Independence Day Award (2013)

== Death ==
Saha died on 27 January 1999 in Dhaka.
