= List of Pakistani Bengali films =

All Bengali films released during the period of undivided Pakistan (before independence of Bangladesh from Pakistan following the 1971 Liberation War) are included under "Bengali" films. But Urdu films made in Dhaka, Bangladesh included in the "Urdu" films tally.

A total number of 156 Bengali feature films were produced in East Pakistan from 1956 to 1971.

== List of films ==
Title	Director	Cast	Genre	Notes
1956
Mukh O Mukhosh	Abdul Jabbar Khan	Abdul Jabbar Khan, Ahmed, Purnima Sen, Nazma (Peary), Zaharat Ara, Ali Mansur	Drama	The first Bengali film produced in Pakistan. The film was released on 3 August, 1956 in Dacca, East Pakistan.
1957
1958
1959
Akash Aar Mati	Fateh Lohani	Amin, Prabir Kumar, Sumita Devi		
Matir Pahar	Mohiuddin	Sumita Devi		
Ei Desh Tomar Amar	Ehtesham	Sumita Devi, Khan Ataur Rahman, Rehman, Madhavi Chatterjee, Subhash Dutta		
1960
Asiya	Fateh Lohani	Sumita Devi, Kazi Khaliq, Ranen Kushad, Shahid	Drama	East Pakistan's Film.
Rajdhanir Buke	Ehtesham	Rahman, Chitra, Subhash Dutta, Nargis	A Musical Hit! Robin Ghosh and Ferdausi Rahman (Begum) collaborated in music direction.	
1961
Harano Din	Mustafiz			
Je Nodi Moru Pothe	Salahuddin			
Kokhono Asheni	Zahir Raihan			
Tomar Amar	Mohiuddin	Anwar Hossain		
1962
Surya Snan	Salahuddin	Anwar Hossain		
Jowar Elo	Abdul Jabbar Khan			
Notun Sur				
Sonar Kajol	Kalim Sharafi, Zahir Raihan			
1963
Dharapat	Salahuddin			
Kancher Deyal	Zahir Raihan	Sumita Devi, Anwar Hossain, Khan Ataur Rahman	Drama	
1964
Dui Digonto				
Eito Jibon	Rahman	Rosy Samad	Drama	
Megh Vanga Rod				
Onek Diner Chena				
Raja Elo Shohore				
Sheet Bikel				
Sutorang	Shubash Dutta			
1965
Ek Kaler Rupkotha				
Godhulir Prem				
Jana Jani				
Nodi o Nari	Sadeque Khan			
Rupban	Salahuddin			
1966
Abar Bonobashe Rupban				
Apon Dulal				
Behula	Zahir Raihan			
Dak Babu				
13 No. Feku Ostagar Lane				
Gunai Bibi				
Kagajer Nouka	Shubash Dutta			
Kar Bou				
Mohua				
Rahim Badshah O Rupban				
Raja Saniyashi				
Ujala				
Bhawal Saniyashi				
Zarina Sundori				
Daak Bangla	Mustafeez			
1967
Agun Niye Khela				
Ali Baba O 40 Chor				
Anwara				
Ayna O Abashista	Shubash Dutta			
Bala				
Chawa Pawa				
Hiramon				
Jongli Meye				
Julekha				
Kanchan Mala				
Moyur Ponkhi				
Nawab Sirajuddaula	Khan Ataur Rahman	Anwar Hossain, Anowara, Khan Ataur Rahman		
Nayontara				
Obhishap				
Aparajeyo				
Saiful Mulk Badiuzzamal				
1968
Arun Barun Kiran Mala	Khan Ataur Rahman		Drama	
Sat Bhai Chompa	Dilip Shom		Drama	
Shahid Titumir	Ibne Mijan			
Abirbhab	Subhash Dutta	Abdur Razzak		
Ballo Bondhu				
Bhaggya Chakra				
Banshori				
Chena Ochena				
Chompakoli				
Chorabali				
Dui Bhai		Abdur Razzak		
Eto Tuku Asha	Mita			
Kuch Boron Konnya				
Modhumala				
Momer Alo				
Nishi Holo Bhor				
Notun Digonto				
Oporichita				
Poroshmoni				
Rakhal Bondhu				
Rup Kumari				
Rupbaner Rupkotha				
Sheet Bosonto				
Sokhina				
Songsar	Zahir Raihan	Abdur Razzak, Suchanda, Babita (as a child artist)		This was the debut film of Babita, who was named "Subarna" for this film. She played the daughter of her real-life sister Shuchanda in this film.
Sapta Dinga				
Suorani Duorani				
1969
Agontuk				
Alingon				
Alomoti				
Alor Pipasa				
Beder Meye				
Bhanu Moti				
Gazi Kalu Chompaboti				
Jowar Bhata				
Mayar Songsar				
Moynamoti	Kazi Jahir	Abdur Razzak, Kabori Sarwar		
Molua				
Moner Moto Bou				
Mukti				
Naginir Prem				
Nil Akasher Niche		Abdur Razzak, Kabori Sarwar		
Notun Nam-e Dako				
Notun Fuler Gondho				
Obanchito		Azim, Sujata, Rozi		
Padma Nodir Majhi				
Palabodol				
Paruler Songsar				
Patal Purir Rajkonna				
Protikar				
Sesh Porjonto		Abdur Razzak		
Swornokomol				
1970
Jibon Theke Neya	Zahir Raihan	Khan Ataur Rahman, Anwar Hossain, Rosy Afsari, Rawshan Jamil, Shuchanda, Abdur Razzak (actor)		A landmark film in the history of the country.
Adorsho Chaapakhana				
Eki Onke Eto Roop				
Amir Saudagar O Bhelua Sundori				
Aka-Baka				
Apon Por				
Bablu				
Bindu Theke Britto				
Binimoy	Subhash Dutta			
Boro Bou				
Chhoddo Beshi				
Dhheu er por Dhheu				
Deep Nebhe Nai		Abdur Razzak		
Dorpo Churno		Abdur Razzak		
Ghurni Jhor				
Je Agune Puri				
Jog Biyog				
Ka Kha Ga Gha Umo				
Kanch Kata Heere				
Kothay Jeno Dekhechi				
Koto Je Minoti				
Manush Omanush				
Mishor Kumari				
Modhumilon				
Monimala				
Nayika				
Notun Probhat				
Odhikar				
Ontorongo				
Pitch Dhala Poth				
Raj Mukut				
Rong Bodlaay				
Sadharon Meye				
Somapti				
Sontan				
Surjo Uthar Age				
Sworo Lipi		Abdur Razzak		
Taka Ana Pai				
Taansen				
1971
Amar Bou				
Gayer Bodhu				
Jolchhobi				
Nacher Putul	Ashok Ghosh	Shabnam, Abdur Razzak		
Smritituku Thak				
Sukh Dukhkha				

== See also ==
- Cinema of Pakistan
- List of Pakistani films
- Cinema of Bangladesh
- List of Bangladeshi films
