= List of Dhallywood films of 1964 =

The Dhallywood film industry released 18 feature films in 1964. (Note: Gazdar dates Bandhan to 1964, but Shikdar dates it to 1965.)

Title	Director	Starring	Language	Ref.
Anek Diner Chena	Khan Ataur Rahman	Hasan Imam, Sultana Zaman, Kaif Khan, Ehtesham	Bengali	
Bandhan	Kazi Zahir	Chitra, Golam Mustafa, Rosy, Anwar Hussain	Urdu	
Dui Diganta	Obaidul Huq	Anwar Hossain, Sumita Devi	Bengali	
Eito Jibon	Zillur Rahim	Shawkat Akbar, Sumita Devi, Rosy, Husn Ara, Anwer, Misbah	Bengali	
Ekaler Rupkatha	Ibne Mizan	Rosy, Raj, Anwer Hussain	Bengali	(Note: Gazdar dates Ekaler Rupkatha to 1965, but Kabir and Shikdar date it to 1964.)
Kancher Deyal	Zahir Raihan	Anwar Hossain, Sumita Devi, Asya, Inam Ahmed, Anis, Rani Sarker	Bengali	(Note: Gazdar and Hayat date Kancher Deyal to 1963, but Kabir, Raju, and Shikdar, date it to 1964.)
Karwaan	S. M. Parvez	Shabnam, Haroon, Tarana, Badarudin	Urdu	
Maalan	Q. Pasha	Nasima Khan, Deep, Dear Asghar, Jalil Afghani	Urdu	
Megh Banga Rode	Kazi Khalek	Sujata, Siraj, Azim, Kazi Khalek	Bengali	
Milan	Rahman	Deeba, Rahman, Akbar, Subhash Dutta	Urdu	
Paise	Mustafiz	Shabnam, Azim, Subhash Dutta, Shawkat Akbar	Urdu	
Raja Elo Shahare	Mohiuddin	Sadek Khan, Chitra Sinha, Hasan Imam, Anwar, Fateh Lohani	Bengali	
Sangam	Zahir Raihan	Rosy, Haroon, Sumita Devi, Khalil	Urdu	
Shaadi	Q. Pasha	Chitra, Deep, Nasima Khan, Jalil Afghani	Urdu	
Sheet Bikel	Mohiuddin	Hasan Imam, Nazneen, Anwer, Sirajul Islam, Shirin, Misbah	Bengali	
Sutorang	Subhash Dutta	Kabori, Subhash Dutta	Bengali	
Tanha	Baby Islam	Shamim Ara, Haroon, Sheikh Hasan, Naina	Urdu	
Yeh Bhi Ek Kahani	S. M. Shafi	Chitra, Haroon, Hina, Badarudin, Misbahudin	Urdu	

== See also ==
- 1964 in Pakistan

== Notes ==
There are numerous minor inconsistencies in transliteration among the sources. Greater discrepancies are as follows:
