= Khan Ataur Rahman discography =

Khan Ataur Rahman was a Bangladeshi actor, producer, director, singer, lyricist and music director. The following list only focuses on his films as a playback singer, lyricist and music director:

== 1960s ==
Year	Film	Notes
1959	Ei Desh Tomar Amar	debut film as a composer
1961	Je Nodi Moru Pothe	
1961	Kokhono Asheni	
1962	Sonar Kajol	
1962	Surjosnaan	
1963	Kancher Deyal	
1964	Anek Diner Chena	
1964	Dui Diganta	
1964	Milan	Urdu film
1964	Sangam	Urdu film
1965	Aakhri Station	Urdu film
1965	Bahana	Urdu film
1965	Mala	Urdu film
1965	Sagar	Urdu film
1966	Raja Sanyasi	
1967	Nawab Sirajaddaula	Urdu and Bengali bilingual film
1968	Arun Barun Kiranmala	
1968	Soye Nadiya Jaage Paani	Urdu film
1969	Jowar Bhata	
1969	Moner Moto Bou	
1969	Qasm Us Waqt Ki	Urdu film

== 1970s ==
Year	Film	Notes
1970	Apon Por	
1970	Jibon Theke Neya	sang one song, wrote the lyrics also
1971	Sukh Dukkho	
1973	Abar Tora Manush Ho	
1973	Jhorer Pakhi	
1974	Triratna	
1975	Sujon Sokhi	
1976	Matir Maya	
1979	Din Jaay Kotha Thake	

== 1980s ==
Year	Film	Notes
1980	Danpite Chhele	Winner: Bangladesh National Film Award for Best Music Director
1983	Arshinogor	
1986	Porosh Pathor	

== 1990s ==
Year	Film	Notes
1994	Sujan Sakhi	
1997	Ekhono Anek Raat	Winner: Bangladesh National Film Award for Best Music Director

== 2000s ==
Year	Film	Notes

== 2010s ==
Year	Film	Notes

== 2020s ==
Year	Film	Notes

== Year Unknown ==
Film	Notes

== Background Score Only ==
Year	Film	Composer	Notes
1975	Keno Emon Hoy	Kamal Dasgupta	

== Non-film albums ==
Year	Album	Artidt
2016	Tumi Cheyechhile Ogo Jante	Abida Sultana

== As lyricist ==
Year	Film	Composer(s)	Notes
1959	Ei Desh Tomar Amar	himself	debut film as a composer
1961	Je Nodi Moru Pothe	himself	
1961	Kokhono Asheni	himself	
1962	Sonar Kajol	himself	
1962	Surjosnaan	himself	
1963	Kancher Deyal	himself	
1964	Anek Diner Chena	himself	
1964	Dui Diganta	himself	
1966	Raja Sanyasi	himself	
1967	Nawab Sirajaddaula	himself	
1968	Arun Barun Kiranmala	himself	
1969	Jowar Bhata	himself	
1969	Moner Moto Bou	himself	
1969	Qasm Us Waqt Ki	himself	Urdu film, written alongside Fayyaz Hashmi
1970	Apon Por	himself	
1970	Jibon Theke Neya	himself	
1971	Sukh Dukkho	himself	
1973	Abar Tora Manush Ho	himself	
1973	Jhorer Pakhi	himself	
1974	Triratna	himself	
1975	Sujon Sokhi	himself	
1979	Din Jaay Kotha Thake	himself	
1980	Danpite Chhele	himself	Winner: Bangladesh National Film Award for Best Lyrics
1983	Arshinogor	himself	
1985	Hisab Nikash	Alam Khan	
1986	Porosh Pathor	himself	
1989	Nawab Sirajuddaula	Amir Ali	
1993	Rajar Meye Parul	Amir Ali	
1994	Sujan Sakhi	himself	
1995	Sujon Sokhi	Anupam Dutta	
1997	Ekhono Anek Raat	himself	Winner: Bangladesh National Film Award for Best Lyrics
