= Altaf Mahmud discography =

Discography of Bangladeshi music director

Altaf Mahmud (1967–1971) was a Bangladeshi music director. He composed for 19 films in his career before his death in the 1971 Independence War. The following is a list of films he scored:

== 1960s ==
Year	Film	Notes
1964	Tanha	Urdu film
1965	Kaise Kahoon	Urdu film
1966	Apon Dulal	
1966	Behula	
1966	Kar Bou	
1966	Rahim Badshah O Rupban	
1967	Agun Niye Khela	in this film he launched singer Sabina Yasmin
1967	Anwara	
1967	Noyontara	
1968	Dui Bhai	
1968	Kuchboron Konna	
1968	Shuorani Duorani	
1968	Songsar	
1968	Soptodinga	
1969	Beder Meye	

== 1970s ==
Year	Film	Notes
1970	Adorsho Chhapakhana	
1970	Anka Banka	
1970	Boro Bou	
1970	Jibon Theke Neya	
1970	Ka Kha Ga Gha Umo	
1970	Mishor Kumari	
1970	Modhumilon	
1970	Taka Ana Pai	
1972	Abujh Mon	released posthumously
1973	Sonali Akash	released posthumously

== Non-film songs ==
Year	Album/Single	Song	Lyrics	Singer(s)
1969	Single	"Amar Bhaiyer Rokte Rangano"	Abdul Gaffar Chowdhury	N/A
