= Behula =

Protagonist of the Manasamangal Kavya text

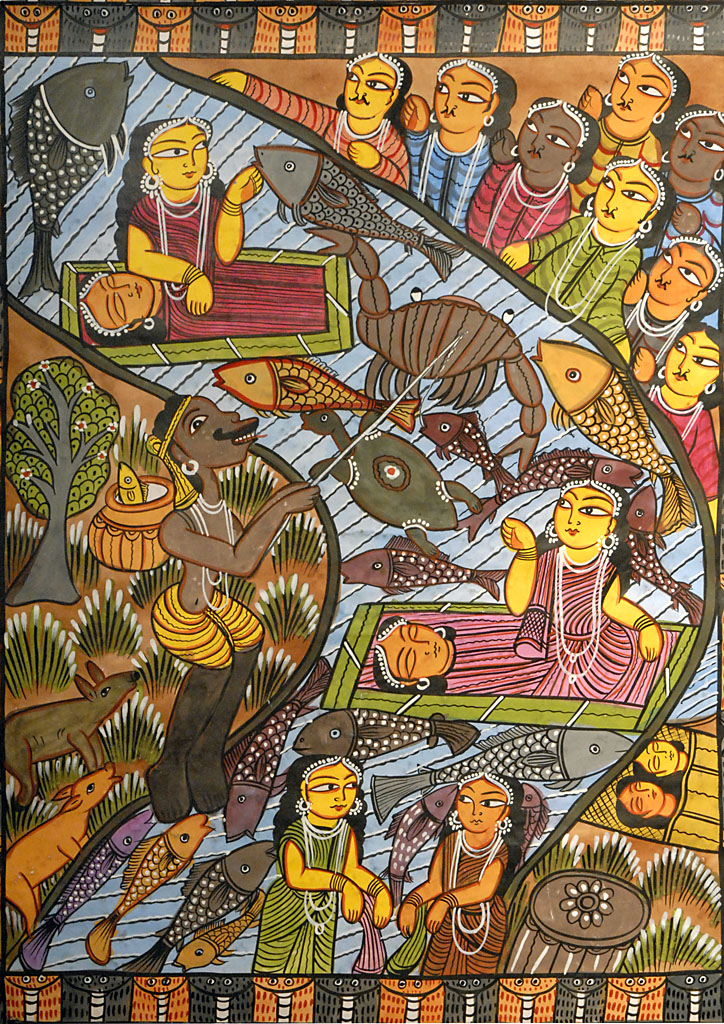
- Behula sails with her dead husband, scene from Manasa Mangal
- Based on: Manasamangal Kavya

In-universe information
- Full name: Usha
- Gender: Female
- Title: Sati Behula
- Spouse: Lakshmindara or Aniruddha
- Relatives: Chand Sadagar (father in-law)

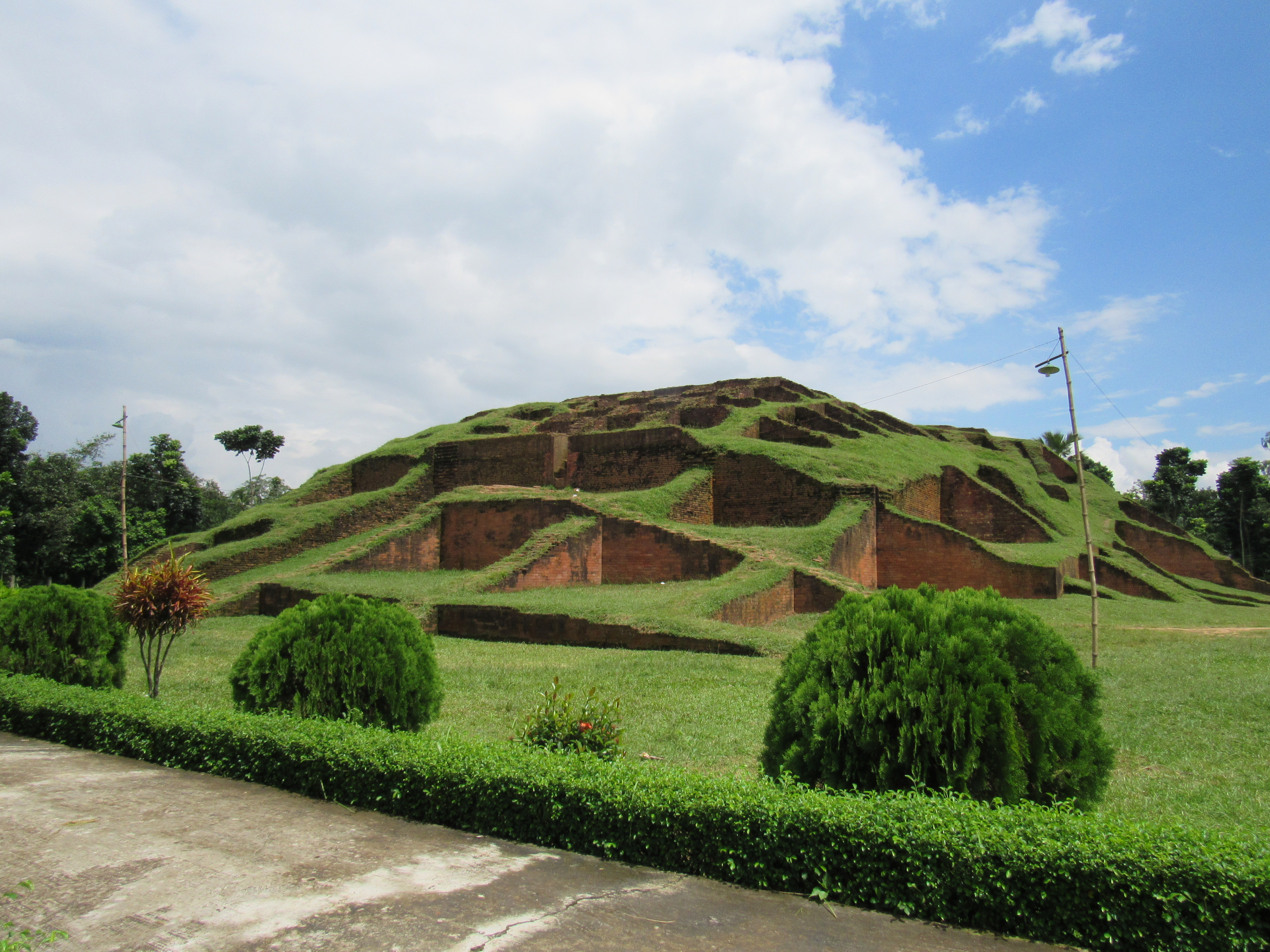
Gokul Medh, ancient ruins claimed to be Lakshmindara-Behula's bridal chamber, near Bogra in Bangladesh

Behula (Bengali: বেহুলা), also spelled Bihula (Bhojpuri: बिहुला), Beula (Assamese: বেউলা), is a protagonist in the Manasamangal genre of Assamese, Angika, Bengali and Bhojpuri medieval epics. A number of works belonging to this genre were written between the thirteenth and eighteenth centuries. Though the religious purpose of these works is to eulogise the Hindu goddess Manasa, these works are more well known for depicting the love story of Behula and her husband Lakhindar (or Lakshindar or Lakshmindara).

== Background ==
Usha, the daughter of Daitya king Banasura, fell in love with Aniruddha, the son of Pradyumna and grandson of Lord Krishna. After their marriage they were reborn as Behula and Lakshindar in their next life and again married each other.

Behula was the daughter-in law of Chand Sadagar of Champaknagar. According to history, two beautiful Apsaras of the heavens, Usha and Aniruddha were cursed by the gods as per the plan of Devi Manasa and sent to earth as Behula and Lakshinder - Behula as the only daughter of Saybene (or Sayven of Ujaninagar) and Lakshinder as the seventh son of Chand Sadagar.

Chand Sadagar was a great devotee of Lord Shiva and for certain reasons, hated Devi Manasa. In order to obtain the position of a goddess in heaven, Manasa had to get "anjali" by the right hand of Chand Sadagar - the Bhaktasreshto. However, Chand vowed to never give anjali to Manasa by his right hand (which he used for giving anjali to Shiva only). To get an anjali from him, Manasa took away the lives of his six sons who died from poisonous snake bites (Devi Manasa had absolute power over all snakes). These deaths further infuriated Chand Sadagar, who vowed to save his last son Lakhinder in any way possible. Chand got to know about Behula, whose horoscope spoke that she could never be widowed. He then got Lakshinder married with Behula, and also had an iron palace built without any holes in it, to ensure that no snake could enter it.

The divine architect Vishwakarma had built this palace for the wedding night of Behula and Lakshinder. When requested by Manasa, he left a hole in the palace. On the wedding night, Manasa sent her most poisonous snake Kalnagini to the couple's room and cast a spell on Behula, making her fall asleep. When Kalnagini was about to bite Lakshinder, she saw that Behula had committed no sin for which she might be given such a harsh punishment. Hence, she used her large tail to smear the parting of Behula's hair with oil from a lamp, which was considered sinful for a newly wed woman. When she bit Lakshinder, he shouted aloud and woke Behula up. Seeing Kalnagini slithering out, she furiously threw the jaanti at her, cutting off the lower part of her body. Kalnagini bit Lakshinder on instruction from Devi Manasa.

To bring her husband back to life, Behula sailed with her dead husband in a raft towards the heavens. Although she faced many dangers during her incredibly long and arduous journey, she eventually reached heaven and pleased all the gods with her enchanting dance. The gods promised to resurrect Lakshinder, provided she would get Chand Sadagar to provide anjali to Manasa. Desperate to save his only surviving son, Chand finally gave in and gave anjali to Manasa by his left hand. Manasa, having attained the position of a goddess in heaven, brought back to life Lakshinder as well as the other six sons of Chand.

=== Another version ===
Having returned to Champak Nagar, Chand Sadagar managed to rebuild his life. In time, he fathered a son whom he named Lakshmindara. At around the same time Saha's wife bore a daughter, whom they named Behula. When they grew up, Lakshindara and Behula decided to marry each other, but when their horoscopes were tallied, they realized that Lakshmindara would die of snakebite on the wedding night. However, as both children were already devotees of Manasa and were so perfectly made-for-each-other, that the marriage went through. Chand Sadagar took extra precautions in building a new bridal chamber that snakes could not penetrate.

In spite of all the precautions, Manasa had her way. One of the snakes sent by her killed Lakshmindara. As per custom, his corpse (like that of any person who died of snakebite) wasn't cremated, but was allowed to float on a raft down the river, in the hopes that he could come back to life due to a miracle. Despite everyone's pleadings, Behula accompanied her dead husband on the raft. They sailed continuously for six months, passing village after village. Even when Lakshindara's corpse began decomposing and the villagers considered mad, she kept on praying to Manasa. All that the latter did was to protect the raft from sinking.

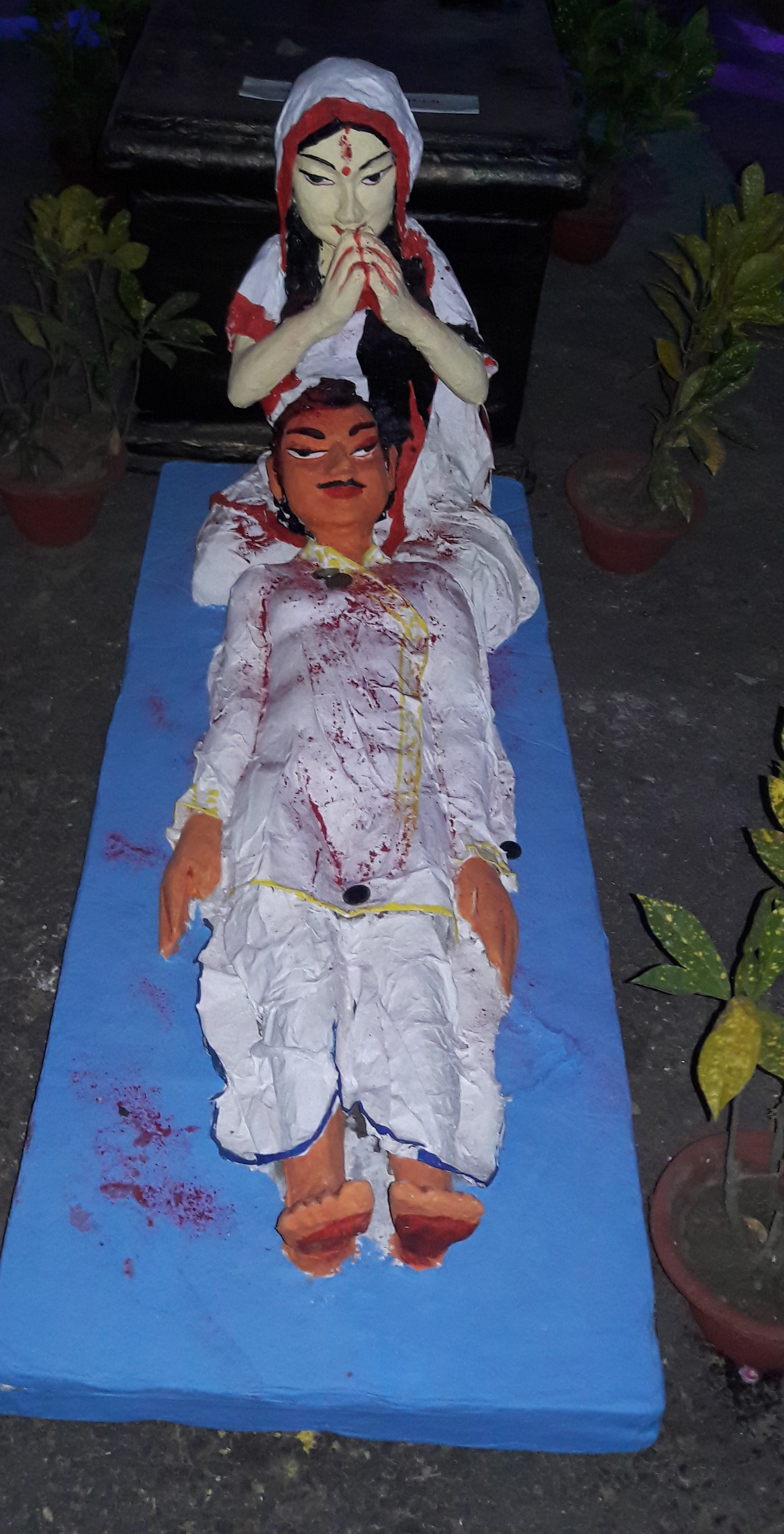
A statue of the dead Lakshindara with Behula at a Durga Puja Pandal, Kolkata

Then, the raft sailed to where Neta, Manasa's elder sister, lived. She was washing clothes on the river bank when the raft touched land. On hearing Behula's perpetual prayers, she decided to take her to Manasa and using her supernatural powers, whisked Behula and Lakshmindara's corpse to heaven. There, Manasa said, "You deserve to have him back, but this can only be done if you promise to convert your father-in-law to my worship."

“I will,” said Behula, and immediately Lakshinder's corpse began stirring. His decayed flesh healed and he opened his eyes, smiling at Behula.

Guided by Neta, the couple returned to earth. On hearing everything from Behula, Chand Sadagar's wife told him about Manasa's conditions. Although he couldn't refuse Manasa's words, he insisted on not worshipping her with his right hand, as he was devoted already to Shiva. He instead he gave "anjali" to the goddess by his left hand.

== Legacy ==
Behula continues to fascinate the peoples minds in Assam and Bengal (Bangladesh and West Bengal). She is often seen as the archetypal wife, full of love and courage. This image of Behula is reflected in one of the poems of the Bengali poet Jibanananda Das. Behula is regarded as the epitome of a loving and loyal wife in the Bengali and the Kamarupi cultures.

Behula's story has been included in Bangladeshi national curriculum.

=== Popular culture ===
The story of Behula has been featured in popular media multiple times. Behula was the first film adaptation of the story by the Pakistani Bengali director Zahir Raihan in 1966, starring Razzak and Suchanda. In 2010, a TV series with the same name was directed by the Indian Bengali director Soumik Chatterjee, and aired on Star Jalsha. 2022 Bangladeshi film Hawa, directed by Mejbaur Rahman Sumon, is loosely based on this story.

In 2021, the Bangladeshi rock band Shunno released a folk-rock ballad called Behula that was inspired by this story. The lyric was penned by Tanvir Chowdhury.
