= Titash Ekti Nadir Naam =

1973 Bangladeshi film by Ritwik Ghatak

Titas Ekti Nadir Naam
- Theatrical release poster
- Directed by: Ritwik Ghatak
- Screenplay by: Ritwik Ghatak
- Based on: Titas Ekti Nadir Naam by Adwaita Mallabarman
- Produced by: N. M. Chowdhury Bacchu; Habibur Rahman Khan; Foyez Ahmed
- Starring: Rosy Samad; Kabori Choudhury; Rowshan Jamil; Rani Sarkar; Sufia Rustam
- Cinematography: Baby Islam
- Edited by: Basheer Hussain
- Music by: Ritwik Ghatak (music theme); Ustad Bahadur Khan
- Production company: Purbapran Kathachitra
- Release date: 27 July 1973
- Running time: 159 mins
- Countries: Bangladesh; India
- Language: Bengali
- Budget: ৳824,000 (US$6,700)
- Box office: ৳123,000 (US$1,000)

Titash Ekti Nadir Naam, or A River Called Titas, is a 1973 Bengali language film directed by Ritwik Ghatak and produced as a joint collaboration between Bangladesh and India. It is based on the 1956 novel of the same name by Adwaita Mallabarman. Set in pre-independence India, the film follows the Malo fishing community along the Titas River. After her rescue from abduction by river bandits, a woman's decision to raise a child alone challenges the community’s rigid traditions surrounding marriage, motherhood, and social order.

Rosy Samad, Golam Mostafa, Kabori, Prabir Mitra, and Roushan Jamil starred in lead roles. Ghatak, then suffering from tuberculosis, saw his health decline during filming.

Along with Satyajit Ray's Kanchenjungha (1962) and Mrinal Sen's Calcutta 71 (1972), Titas Ekti Nadir Naam ranks among the earliest examples of hyperlink cinema—featuring multiple protagonists in interwoven narrative threads, reminiscent of Jean Renoir's The Rules of the Game (1939) and preceding Robert Altman's Nashville (1975). In 2002, the film topped the list of 10 best Bangladeshi films in the audience and critics' polls by the British Film Institute.

== Plot ==
A fisherman by the River Titas, Kishore, marries a young girl, Rajar Jhi, on impulse when he visits a nearby village. After their wedding night, they head for Kishore's village on his boat the following night. Rajar Jhi is kidnapped on the way by bandits as the fishermen sleep but jumps into the river and is rescued by fishermen from another area. She is too ashamed to return to her home village, as they would suspect her of having been abandoned by or having deserted her husband. Unfortunately, she knows little about her husband, not even his name, though these were recorded in her home village. The only thing she remembers is the name of his village. Kishore in turn does not return for her as the shock of losing her has driven him mad and he assumes that the bandits have taken her to an unknown destination.

Ten years later, Rajar Jhi attempts with their son to find Kishore to give him a father. Some residents of his village refuse to share food with them because of imminent starvation but a young widow, Basanti, helps them. Later, it turns out that Kishore and Basanti were childhood lovers.

Director Ghatak appears in the film as a boatman, and Basanti's story is the first of several melodramatic tales.

== Cast ==
- Rosy Samad as Basanti
- Kabori Choudhury as Rajar Jhi
- Rowshan Jamil as Basanti's mother
- Rani Sarkar as Munglee
- Sufia Rustam as Udaytara
- Prabir Mitra as Kishore
- Bonani Choudhury as Morol Ginni
- Chand as Subla
- Golam Mustafa as Ramprasad & Kader Milan
- Ritwik Ghatak as Tilak Chand
- Fakrul Hasan Bairagi as Nibaran Kundu
- Shafikul Islam as Ananta
- Chetana Das
- Farid Ali
- Abul Hayat

== Reception ==
=== Critical response ===
So, for Ghatak, it's like making a film on a civilisation. You cannot identify the theme of Titas. When you want to say, "What is this film about?" It's impossible, it's so difficult. If you talk about one thing then you just sort of reduce the complexity of that work. So some people have looked at Titas, especially some Western critics and this has been their kind of objection to Ghatak, that he's melodramatic. To my mind he's not melodramatic at all, I feel he is actually using melodrama only as a medium.

— Mani Kaul

Dennis Schwartz, who gave the film an "A" grade, wrote: "It's a passionate film made with great conviction, that features a marriage ceremony with the only sounds heard being the bride's heavy breathing. The pic is filled with traditional music, tribal customs, an abduction, a murder, a suicide, an insanity and starvation. In the end, it signals the demise of a long-standing culture because of various reasons, such as the inability to change with the times, the fractured nature of the village and their inability to deal with outside forces like money-lender schemers. It's a haunting and unforgettable film about the joys, anguish and rage of a community that was unable to survive. Ghatak clearly uses the story as a tragic analogy of what happened to the Bengali people as a result of the Partition of Bengal between British India and Pakistan in 1947." Christel Loar of Popmatters (who scored the film an 8 out of 10) writes that "in addition to using the river itself as a character, a metaphor, and a vehicle for the storytelling, another aspect of A River Called Titus is its references to Indian cultural and spiritual themes. Classical mythic imagery flows through the film on a course that parallels the river's, to a certain extent. Not coincidentally, the main relationships of Kishore, Basanti and Rajar Jhi mirror tales of the romantic life of Krisha [sic], and the lovers' triangle he had with his wife, Rukmini, and his lover, Radha." Jordan Cronk of Slant called the film, in comparison to Dry Summer, "less tightly coiled, more meditative, an appropriate approach for a film preoccupied with the existential concerns of a gallery of characters living along the shores of the film’s namesake river. Spanning an entire generation, the film utilizes its main character, Basanti, who endures a litany of tragedies and mundanities alike as she’s married off only to be sacrificed to nature’s unforgiving advancement, as a symbol for countless victims of Bangladesh’s partition era, when the division of India and Pakistan left thousands of people impoverished." Adrian Martin, scoring the film four-and-a-half stars out of 5, labelled the film a "pure melodrama". "He makes use of cultural archetypes familiar to the broadest Indian audience, such as the suffering mother, the wise (or crazy) old man of the village, the local gossips, the blushing, virginal bride" he writes, "and then twists narrative conventions, both subtly and provocatively. The film is, in line with Ghatak’s Brechtian orientation, a broken, deliberately disjointed melodrama, arranged in two starkly distinct halves, and gives itself the freedom to hop from one character’s story thread to another’s — an uncommon technique in world cinema of the time." He called Ghatak's "film language every bit as sophisticated and restless as that of Jean-Luc Godard or Lynne Ramsay. Ghatak was a poet of rupture."

Conversely, Mike D'Angelo of The A.V. Club, who gave the film a "C−", called it "clumsily melodramatic tale of the fallout that occurs after bandits kidnap a pregnant bride...Leaping forward in time without signposts and continually wandering off on pointless digressions, the film is somehow both overly plotted (coincidences and conveniences abound) and dramatically shapeless, with its lauded anticipation of “hyperlink” cinema—abrupt shifts in focus from one character to another—often coming across as random. What’s more, Ghatak has enormous difficulty simply establishing a coherent tone; the story’s most tragic moment is so broadly played that it threatens to inspire laughter rather than anguish." Despite this, he lauded its "breathtaking black-and-white images on the banks of the titular river" and recommended Meghe Dhaka Tara, "his consensus masterpiece", as a better introduction to his filmography.

=== Screenings in different festivals ===
- 2017: Ritwik Ghatak Retrospective UK, at Dundee Contemporary Arts, Dundee, Scotland, UK, Programme curated by Sanghita Sen, Department of Film Studies, St Andrews University, UK

=== Accolades ===
In 2007, A River Called Titas topped the list of 10 best Bangladeshi films, as chosen in the audience and critics' polls conducted by the British Film Institute.
