= Farid Ali (actor) =

Bangladeshi actor (1945-2016)

- ফরিদ আলী
- Born: 7 April 1941; Dhaka, Bengal Presidency, British India
- Died: 22 August 2016 (aged 71); Dhaka, Bangladesh
- Resting place: Banani Graveyard
- Occupation: Actor

Farid Ali (7 April 1945 – 22 August 2016) was a Bangladeshi actor.

== Career ==
Ali debuted his acting career In 1962 when he performed in the stage drama "Kone Dekha", directed by Shahidul Amin. He first acted in television drama in "Ektala-Dotala" in 1964 and in film in "Dharapat" in 1966.

Ali acted in notable films including Sangam, Gunda and Titash Ekti Nadir Naam.

== Death ==
Ali died at the age of 75 due to cardiac arrest at a cardiac institute in Mirpur.
