= Rani Sarker =

Bangladeshi actress

- রানী সরকার
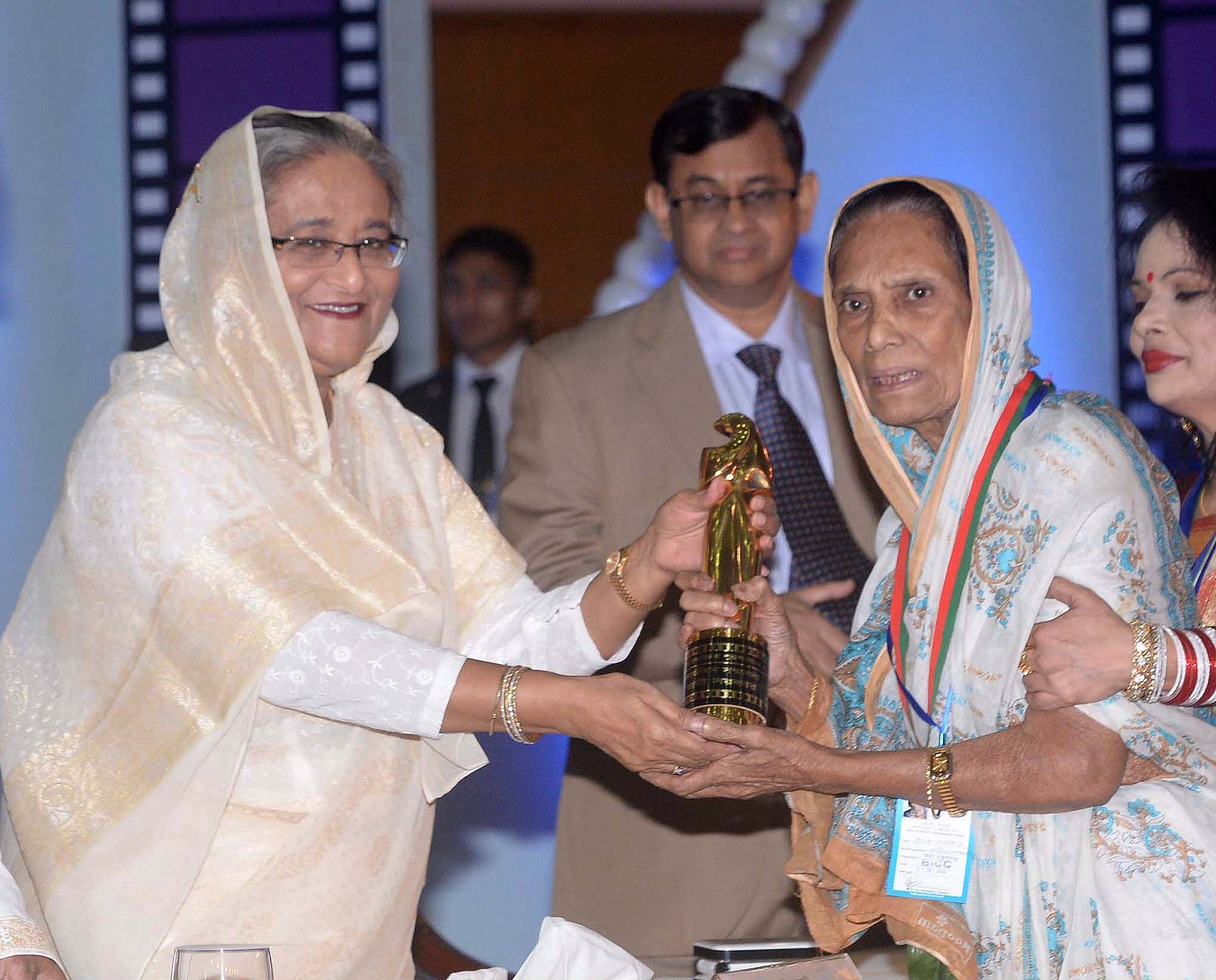
- Sarker (right) receiving Bangladesh National Film Award for Lifetime Achievement
- Born: Mosammat Amirun Nesa Khanam; Shonatol, Kaliganj Upazila, Satkhira, Bengal Presidency, British India
- Died: 7 July 2018 (aged 86); Dhaka, Bangladesh
- Resting place: Azimpur Graveyard, Dhaka
- Occupation: Actress

Mosammat Amirun Nesa Khanam, known by her stage name Rani Sarker (1931/1932 – 7 July 2018) was a Bangladeshi film actress. She started her acting career in Bengali cinema in the 1960s.

In 2014, she was awarded Bangladesh National Film Award for Lifetime Achievement for her contribution to Bengali films.

== Early life and education ==
Sarker was born on Sonatola village of Kaliganj Upazila of Satkhira District to Solaiman Mollah and Asia Khatun. She completed her primary education from Satkhira Sonatala UP school. Afterward, she passed the matriculation examination from Khulna Coronation Girls High School.

== Career ==
Sarker debuted her acting career as a stage performer in 1958. In the same year, she got her breakthrough in the film Dur Hai Shukh Ka Gao, directed by A. J. Kardar. In 1962, she performed at Ehtesham's Urdu film Chanda. She got to play the lead role in two other notable films Talash and Notun Sur.

== Filmography ==
- Dur Hain Sukh Ka Gao (1958)
- Chanda (1962)
- Talash (1963)
- Natun Sur (1963)
- Kancher Deyal (1963)
- Sangam (1964)
- Sutorang (1964)
- Behula (1966)
- Bhawal Sannyasi (1966)
- Saifulmulok Badiujjaman (1967)
- Nawab Sirajuddullah (1967)
- Anowara (1967)
- Bandhom
- Ghor Vanga Ghor
- Ke Tumi
- Iss Dharti Paar
- Payse
- Kaise Hoon
- Azam
- Malua
- Arun Barun Kironmala
- Nasghor
- Choddobeshi
- Chokher Joll
- Reshmi Churi
- Nolok
- Motsho Kumari
- Pothe Holo Dekha
- Sai Tufan
- Mayar Sangshar
- Vanumati
- Takar Khela
- Kanch Kata Hirey (1970)
- Nacher Putul (1971)
- Titash Ekti Nadir Naam (1973)
- Somadhan (1973)
- Rangbaaz (1973)
- Shurjogrohon (1976)
- Shurjokonna (1977)
- Sokhi tumi kar (1980)
- Devdas (1982)
- Chandranath (1984)
- Princess Tina Khan (1985)
- Miss Lolita (1985)
- Shuvoda (1986)
- Shyam Saheb (1986)
- Ghani (2006)
- Ayna (2006)
- Ebadat (2009)
- Third Person Singular Number (2009)
- Abujh Bou (2010)
- Karigar (2012)
- Ekee Britte (2013)
- Nekabborer Mohaproyan (2014)
- Grash (2016)
