= Major Khaled's War =

- Directed by: Vanya Kewley
- Produced by: Gita Mehta
- Narrated by: Vanya Kewley
- Cinematography: Mike Whittaker
- Edited by: Kelvin Hendrie
- Production company: Granada Television
- Distributed by: Granada Television
- Release date: 12 July 1971
- Running time: 26 Minutes 13 Seconds
- Country: United Kingdom
- Language: English

Major Khaled's War is an English-language documentary film that focuses on the frontline combat activities of Major Khaled Mosharraf, the commander of the K-Force during the Bangladesh Liberation War. Directed by television journalist Vanya Sarah Kewley, the documentary was filmed as an episode of the "World in Action" series, produced by Granada Television in the United Kingdom in 1971. It stands as one of the most significant documentaries about the Bangladesh Liberation War created by foreign filmmakers.

== Production ==
The documentary was produced under the executive guidance of Jeremy Aylwin and Indian-born author and television journalist Gita Mehta. Vanya Kewley not only directed the documentary but also crafted and narrated the entire report. The film's editing was handled by Kelvin Hendrie, with Peter Walker overseeing the dubbing.

=== Crew ===
- Executive Producer: Jeremy Aylwin
- Producer: Gita Mehta
- Director: Vanya Kewley
- Narrator: Vanya Kewley
- Cinematographer: Mike Whittaker
- Sound Recordist: Colin Richards
- Film Editor: Kelvin Hendrie
- Dubbing Editor: Peter Walker

== Content and Release ==
To produce the documentary, reporter Vanya Kewley, along with cameraman Mike Whittaker and sound engineer Colin Richards, spent eight days on the battlefield in June 1971 during the Bangladesh Liberation War. They accompanied then-Major Khaled Mosharraf and his infantry in the regions of Sylhet, Comilla, and Noakhali under the command of the K-Force. The documentary captures the armed guerrilla warfare and military strategies of the Mukti Bahini (Liberation Army) in the areas of Akhaura and Mandbhag, as well as interviews with Major Khaled Mosharraf, Major Abdus Salek Chowdhury, and families who had suffered under Pakistani forces. The documentary was broadcast on 12 July 1971, as the 41st episode of the seventh season of Granada Television's World in Action series.

== See also ==
- Stop Genocide
