= Shahidullah Kaiser =

Bangladeshi novelist and writer

- শহীদুল্লা কায়সার
- Pronunciation: [ʃoɦid̪ulːa kae̯saɾ]
- Born: Abu Nayeem Mohammad Shahidullah; 16 February 1926; Majupur, Feni, Bengal Presidency
- Disappeared: 14 December 1971 (aged 44); Dhaka, Bangladesh
- Status: Missing for 54 years, 9 months and 22 days (Although he disappeared, he was declared dead in absentia)
- Education: BA
- Alma mater: Presidency College, Kolkata
- Occupations: Writer, novelist, journalist, editor
- Spouse: Panna Kaiser (m. 1969)
- Children: 2, including Shomi Kaiser
- Relatives: Zahir Raihan (brother) Shuchanda (sister-in-law)
- Awards: list of awards

Shahidullah Kaiser (Note: Bengali pronunciation: [ʃoɦid̪ulːa kae̯saɾ].) (Bengali pronunciation: [ʃoɦid̪ulːa kae̯saɾ]; 16 February 1926 – disappeared 14 December 1971) was a novelist and writer from East Pakistan. He was awarded Bangla Academy Literary Award in 1969, Ekushey Padak in 1983, and the Independence Day Award in 1998.

== Personal life ==
Abu Nayeem Mohammad Shahidullah was born on 16 February 1926 to a Bengali Muslim family in the village of Majupur in Sonagazi, Feni subdivision, then part of the Noakhali district of the Bengal Presidency. His father, Mawlana Mohammad Habibullah, was a professor at the Calcutta Alia Madrasa and later the Dacca Alia Madrasa. Shahidullah was the eldest of Habibullah's eight children, followed by Nafisa Kabir, Zahir Raihan, Zakaria Habib, Suraiyah, Shahenshah Begum, Mohammad Obaidullah, and Mohammad Saifullah.

== Education ==
Shahidullah studied at Amirabad BC Laha High School in Sonagazi. He also studied at the Presidency College Calcutta and obtained a bachelor's degree in economics with honours. Later, he enrolled in a Master of Arts program at the University of Calcutta but did not completed the degree. At some point, he adopted the name Shahidullah Kaiser.

== Politics and journalism ==
Kaiser was active in politics and cultural movements from his student days. Following the formation of Pakistan in 1947, he joined the provincial Communist Party of East Pakistan. He started working as a journalist in 1949 with the Ittefaq in Dhaka. In 1952, he participated actively in the Language Movement. For his political role in the movement for protection of Bengali language, Kaiser was arrested on 3 June 1952. He was later jailed for three and a half years. Following his release in 1955, he was again arrested and jailed on a political crackdown on activists. A few years later, he was released. In 1958, Kaiser joined as an associate editor of The Sangbad – a Bengali language daily – where he worked for the rest of his life. When the military coup of 1958 put Ayub Khan in power, and martial law was proclaimed, Kaiser was arrested again on 14 October 1958 and remained in jail for four years till his release in September 1962.

== Disappearance ==
Kaiser collected medicine and food and delivered those to the posts, such as one being Sufia Kamal's house, from where the freedom fighters picked those up for their training outpost.

At the end of the Bangladesh Liberation War of 1971, the Pakistan Army and its local collaborators initiated a plan for killing the leading Bengali intellectuals and blaming it on the Pakistan Army to incite rebellion. As part of it, Kaiser was rounded up on 14 December 1971. He never returned, nor was his body ever found. It is assumed that he was executed along with other intellectuals. His brother, Zahir Raihan, a notable filmmaker, also disappeared while searching for Kaiser.

In early December 1971, Kaiser cautioned Sufia Kamal to leave Dhaka, but he himself did not leave and was caught by the Pakistani Army.

On 3 November 2013, Chowdhury Mueen-Uddin, a Muslim leader based in London, and Ashrafuz Zaman Khan, based in the United States, were sentenced in absentia after the court found that they were involved in the abduction and murders of 18 people – nine Dhaka University teachers, six journalists, including Kaiser and three physicians – in December 1971.

Chowdhury Mueen-Uddin denied the charges in an interview aired by Al Jazeera in August 2013.

== Personal life ==
Kaiser's wife, Panna, was an author and novelist. She served as a member of the parliament for the Awami League government from 1996 to 2001. Kaiser's daughter, Shomi Kaiser, is a television actress. His son, Amitav Kaiser, is a banker. Activist Shahriar Kabir was Kaiser's paternal cousin.

== Bibliography ==
- Sareng Bou (The Captain's Wife, 1962)
- Rajbandir Rojnamacha (The Diary of a Political Prisoner, 1962)
- Sangshaptak (The Indomitable Soldiers, 1965)
- Peshwar Theke Tashkhand (From Peshwar to Tashkent, 1966)
- Krishnachura Megh (Delonix regia Clouds)
- Timir Balay (The Circle of Darkness)
- Digante Phuler Agun (The Flaming Horizon)
- Samudra O Trishna (Sea and Thirst)
- Chandrabhaner Kanya (Chandrabhan's Daughter)
- Kabe Pohabe Bibhabari (When Will It Dawn?) (unfinished)

== Filmography ==
TV Series

- Songsoptok (The Indomitable Soldiers, 1971)

== Awards ==
- Adamjee Literary Award, 1962
- Bangla Academy Literary Award, 1969
- Ekushey Padak, 1983
- Independence Day Award, 1998

== See also ==
- 1971 killing of Bengali intellectuals
- List of journalists killed in Bangladesh
- List of people who disappeared mysteriously: post-1970
