= Kokhono Asheni =

1961 Pakistani Bengali-language film

- Bengali: কখনো আসেনি
- Directed by: Zaheer Raihan
- Written by: Zaheer Raihan
- Produced by: Azizul Haque; Manjurul Haque
- Starring: Sumita Devi; Khan Ataur Rahman; Sanjeeb Dutt; Shabnam; Kona; Shahidul Amin; Abdullah Yusuf Imam
- Cinematography: Q.M. Zaman
- Edited by: Q.M. Zaman
- Music by: Khan Ataur Rahman
- Production company: Little Cine Circle
- Distributed by: Era Films, Dhaka
- Release date: 24 November 1961
- Running time: 141 minutes
- Country: Pakistan
- Language: Bengali

Kokhono Asheni (English: Never Came) is a 1961 Pakistani Bengali-language art film, written and directed by Zaheer Raihan. It was his debut as a film director. The film was produced by Azizul Haque and Manjurul Haque. It stars Sumita Devi and Khan Ataur Rahman in lead roles with Sanjib Dutt, Shabnam, and Kana in supporting roles.

== Cast ==
- Sumita Devi - Mary
- Khan Ataur Rahman - Shawkat
- Sanjiv Dutt - Sultan
- Shabnam
- Kona
- Mesbah
- Shahidul Amin
- Abdullah Yusuf Imam
- B, A, Malek
- Narayan Chakravarti
- Muffizul Islam
- Civil Majumder
- Mohammad Habib
- Chakan
- Taher
- Anima
- Devdas Chakravarti

== Music ==
The film music directed by Khan Ataur Rahman. There are six tracks in this film. Kalim Sharafi wrote the song "Kon Dur Batayone". The film singers are Mahbuba Rahman, Khan Ataur Rahman and Kalim Sharafi.

=== Track list ===
Kokhono Aseni

Soundtrack album by Mahbuba Rahman, Khan Ataur Rahman and Kalim Sharafi
- Released: 1961
- Recorded: 1960
- Director: Khan Ataur Rahman
- Producer: Azizul Haque; Manjurul Haque

No.	Title	Lyrics	Singer(s)	Length
1.	"Dunia Boro Elomelo"	Khan Ataur Rahman	Khan Ataur Rahman	3:51
2.	"Sona Rode Vora Ei Poushali Dupure"	Khan Ataur Rahman	Khan Ataur Rahman	3:55
3.	"Nirala Rater Prothom Prohor"		Mahbuba Rahman	3:30
4.	"Ekhon Ratri"		Mahbuba Rahman	3:29
5.	"Ki Pelam"		Mahbuba Rahman	4:24
6.	"Kon Dur Batayon"	Kalim Sharafi	Kalim Sharafi	4:38
