= Iftekharul Alam Kislu =

Bangladeshi filmmaker (died 2019)

- ইফতেখারুল আলম কিসলু
- Born: 1927/28
- Died: 5 January 2019 (aged 91)
- Occupations: Film producer, business person

Iftekharul Alam Kislu (1927/28 - 5 January 2019) was a Bangladeshi film producer and businessperson. He was the president of the Federation of Bangladesh Chambers of Commerce & Industries.

== Biography ==
Kislu was Ahmed Sharif's uncle. He was the owner of Star Film Corporation. He produced Sangam (1964), Anwara (1967), Ora Egaro Jon (1972) and Dui Poisar Alta (1982).

Besides his career in Dhallywood Kislu was a businessperson. He was the president of the Federation of Bangladesh Chambers of Commerce & Industries in 1980. He was a lifetime member of North South University Trust.

Kislu died on 5 January 2019 at the age of 91.

== Selected filmography ==
- Sangam (1964)
- Behula (1966)
- Alibaba (1967)
- Anwara (1967)
- Songsar (1968)
- Ora Egaro Jon (1972)
- Dui Poisar Alta (1982)
