= Zahir Raihan =

Bangladeshi novelist, writer and filmmaker (1935–1971)

- জহির রায়হান
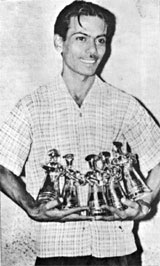
- Pronunciation: [d͡ʒoɦiɾ rae̯ɦan]
- Born: 19 August 1935; Noakhali District, Bengal, British India (now Majupur, Feni District, Bangladesh)
- Disappeared: 30 January 1972 (aged 36); Mirpur Thana, Dhaka, Bangladesh
- Status: Missing for 54 years, 10 months and 17 days
- Education: University of Dhaka
- Occupations: Filmmaker; novelist; writer
- Notable work: Stop Genocide
- Spouses: Sumita Devi (m. 1961; div. 1968); Shuchanda (m. 1968)
- Relatives: Shahidullah Kaiser (brother); Panna Kaiser (sister-in-law); Shomi Kaiser (niece)
- Awards: full list

Mohammad Zahirullah (19 August 1935 – disappeared 30 January 1972), known as Zahir Raihan (Bengali pronunciation: [d͡ʒoɦiɾ rae̯ɦan]), (Note: Bengali pronunciation: [d͡ʒoɦiɾ rae̯ɦan].) was a Bangladeshi novelist, writer and filmmaker. He is most notable for his documentary Stop Genocide (1971), made during the Bangladesh Liberation War. He was posthumously awarded Ekushey Padak in 1977 and Independence Day Award in 1992 by the government of Bangladesh.

== Early life and education ==
Mohammad Zahirullah was born on 19 August 1935 in the village of Majupur in Sonagazi, Feni subdivision, then a part of the Bengal Presidency's Noakhali district. His father, Mawlana Mohammad Habibullah, was a professor at the Calcutta Alia Madrasa and later the Dacca Alia Madrasa. Raihan had enrolled at the former institution's Anglo-Persian Department but his studies were interrupted due to the Partition of Bengal in 1947, and so he, along with his parents, returned to his village from Calcutta.

== Career ==
Along with literary works, Raihan started working as a journalist, when he joined Juger Alo in 1950. Later, he also worked in newspapers, namely Khapchhara, Jantrik, and Cinema. He also worked as the editor of Probaho in 1956. His first collection of short stories, titled Suryagrahan, was published in 1955. He worked as an assistant director on the Urdu film Jago Hua Savera in 1957. This was his first direct involvement in film. He also assisted Salahuddin in the film Je Nadi Marupathe. The filmmaker Ehtesham also employed him on his film E Desh Tomar Amar, for which he wrote the title song. In 1960, he made his directorial début with Kokhono Asheni, which was released in 1961. In 1964, he made Pakistan's first colour film, Sangam, and completed his first CinemaScope film, Bahana, the following year.

Raihan was an active supporter of the Bengali language movement of 1952 and was present at the historical meeting of Amtala on 21 February 1952. He was among the first group of people who got arrested on the day. The effect of the Bengali Language Movement was so strong on him that he used it as the premise of his landmark film Jibon Theke Neya. He also took part in the 1969 Mass uprising in East Pakistan.

In the immediate aftermath of the March 1971 start of the Bangladesh Liberation War, Raihan made the documentary Stop Genocide. Before that he was making his first English film, Let There Be Light. He abandoned the project and made his most notable work, the documentary Stop Genocide, depicting the horrendous atrocities of the Pakistani forces. Critic Ziaul Haq Swapan calls it the start of the history of Bangladeshi documentaries and describes it as "a vehement protest against the Pakistan army's pogrom in Bangladesh". Raihan also made the documentary A State is Born during the war. Raihan went to Calcutta during the conflict, where his film Jibon Theke Neya was shown. His film was highly acclaimed by Satyajit Ray, Ritwik Ghatak, Mrinal Sen, and Tapan Sinha. Though he was in financial difficulties at the time, he gave all his money from the Calcutta showing to the Freedom Fighters trust.

== Personal life ==
His father's name was Mohammad Habibullah and mother's name was Syeda Sufia Khatun. He had an elder brother named Shahidullah Kaiser. Raihan had been married twice, to Sumita Devi in 1961 and Shuchonda in 1968, both of whom were film actresses. With Sumita he had two sons, Bipul Raihan and Anol Raihan. Again with Shuchonda, had also two sons named Opu Raihan and Topu Raihan.

== Disappearance ==
Raihan went missing on 30 January 1972, when he was trying to locate his brother, notable writer Shahidullah Kaiser, who was captured and presumably killed by the Pakistan army and/or local collaborators during the final days of the liberation war. Many believe that he was killed with many others when armed Bihari and Bengali collaborators and soldiers of the Pakistan Army who were hiding fired on them when they went to Mirpur, a suburb of the capital city of Dhaka that was one of few strongholds for Pakistani/Bihari collaborators at that time, but nothing was investigated during the time of Sheikh Mujibur Rahman government.

== Books ==
=== Novels ===
- Shesh Bikeler Meye (A Girl in the Late-Afternoon)
- Trishna (Thirst)
- Hajar Bachhar Dhare (For Thousand Years)
- Arek Phalgun (Another Spring)
- Baraf Gala Nadi (River of Melted Ice)
- Ar Kato Din (How Many More Days)
- Kayekti Mrityu (A Few Deaths)
- Ekushey February (21 February)

=== Short stories ===
- Sonar Harin (The Golden Deer)
- Shomoyer Prayojane (For the Need of Time)
- Ekti Jigyasa (One Question)
- Harano Balay (The Lost Ring)
- Badh (The Protest)
- Suryagrahan (The Solar Eclipse)
- Naya Pattan (The New Foundation)
- Bhangachora (The Broken)
- Aparadh (The Crime)
- Swikriti (The Congratulations)
- Ati Parichito (Very Familiar)
- Ichchha Anichchha (Wish or No Wish)
- Janmantar (Reincarnation)
- Poster
- Ichchhar Agune Jwalchhi (Burnt in the Fire of Wish)
- Katogulo Kukurer Artanad (Bark of Some Dogs)
- Kayekti Sanlap (Some Dialogues)
- Demag (Pride)
- Massacre
- Ekusher Galpo (Story of 21)

== Filmography ==
=== Director ===
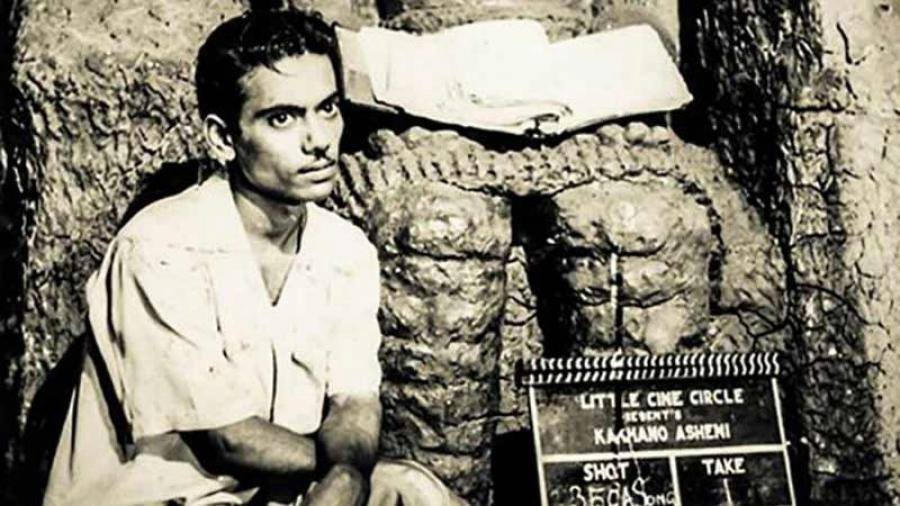
Raihan at the set of the film Kokhono Asheni (1961)

Films

- Kokhono Asheni, 1961
- Sonar Kajol, 1962 (jointly with Kalim Sharafi)
- Kancher Deyal, 1963
- Sangam, 1964, Urdu
- Bahana, 1965, Urdu
- Behula, 1966
- Anwara, 1967
- Jibon Theke Neya, 1970
- Jaltey Suraj Ke Neeche, 1971, Urdu
- Let There Be Light, unfinished

Documentary films

- Stop Genocide, 1971
- A State is Born, 1971

=== Producer ===
- Kancher Deyal, 1963
- Sangam, 1964, Urdu
- Bahana, 1965, Urdu
- Behula, 1966
- Roi Bhai, 1967
- Dui Bhai, 1968
- Shuorani Duorani, 1968
- Moner Moto Bou, 1969
- Shesh Parjyanta, 1969
- Jibon Theke Neya, 1970, with A. Rahman

== Awards ==
- Adamjee Literary Award
- Bangla Academy Literary Award (1972)
- Ekushey Padak (1977)
- Independence Day Award (1992)
- Bangladesh National Film Awards (2005)

== See also ==
- List of people who disappeared mysteriously: post-1970
