= Stop Genocide =

1971 film by Zahir Raihan

- Directed by: Zahir Raihan
- Produced by: Bangladesh Chalachitra Shilpi-O-Kushali Swahayak Samity
- Narrated by: Alamgir Kabir
- Edited by: Debabrata Sen Gupta
- Release date: 1971
- Running time: 20 minutes
- Country: Bangladesh

Stop Genocide is a 1971 documentary film by Bangladeshi filmmaker Zahir Raihan. It is a 20-minute film that documents the killings and atrocities carried out by the Pakistan Army on the people of the then East Pakistan. It also depicts the plight of the refugees and the activities of the Government in exile.

Raihan made his debut in making of documentary films with Stop Genocide.

Raihan started planning for this documentary around April–May in 1971 and soon started making it. Film director Alamgir Kabir helped him. Filmed in June, it was produced in less than a month.

The similarity of this documentary with some of those by Cuban filmmaker Santiago Álvarez indicates Álvarez's influence over Zahir Raihan. Raihan adopted a new technique of film-making of using found video clips and photographs while he was working for this documentary. The film was created using whatever was found in newsreel clips and footage. Raihan made this documentary with an aim to move world opinion against the brutal acts committed by the Pakistan Army. Raihan was a Refugee staying in Kolkata when he made this film.

== Content summary ==
The documentary starts by quoting Lenin from The Right of Nations to Self-Determination. A sketch of Lenin appears at the beginning and then a series of long and mid shots delineate a peaceful country life. But soon gunshots and turbulence replace the tranquility. The next few shots portray the plunder, fire, wreckage, and killings committed by the Pakistan Army. The preamble of the United Nations Charter is mentioned several times. A series of still photos create some of the sequences that show the bombing of the US Air force in Vietnam and its aftermath. The Dateline shows Saigon of 20 July. Bomber B-52 and a burnt Vietnamese child are seen. The focus switches from Saigon to Bongaon, India. Processions of refugees make a few sequences. A picture of struggling, distressing life of homeless, helpless, frightened refugees follows. Some of the refugees are seen looking for shelter in refugee camps while not an inch of any camp can accommodate them. Next appears a series of long shots taken from pictures of raped women, destroyed buildings and heaps of dead bodies. Alternating appearances of Hitler, pictures of Nazis, the massacre by Nazis, piles of dead bodies nearby German prison camps, refugee camps in India, heaps of dead bodies in the streets of Bangladesh, fire, and wreckage in towns and villages make the next few scenes. Numerous corpses are seen in rivers, streets, paddy fields, under the trees and on green, long grass. Shot after shot illustrate the sufferings of refugees. An old woman talks to an inquirer. The camera focuses on a group of armed guerrilla returning from an operation. Soon they disappear in the woods. Camps of freedom fighters and the camp commandant appear. The commandant gives an interview. He talks about the war, the reason behind the war, the moral strength and confidence they own. The documentary ends with the word STOP occupying full frame.

== Production ==
The black-and-white documentary used 35 mm film. The narrative was in English and it was an opportunity to convey the message of the suffering of oppressed people of the newly born country of Bangladesh to the rest of the world.

The documentary was produced by Bangladesh Chalachitra Shilpi-O-Kushali Swahayak Samity.

=== Crew ===
- Zahir Raihan: Screenplay and direction.
- Babul Chowdhury : Chief Assistant
- Debabrata Sen Gupta : Editing
- Chitta Bardhan : Production
- Arun Roy : Photography

Commentary written and spoken by Alamgir Kabir.

== Financing ==
The Department of Films and Publications of Mujibnagar Government did not consider the director's attempt to make a documentary on the ongoing Liberation War important at first. Later they agreed to finance the documentary.

With the help of a few cultural activists, Raihan managed to collect funds for the film from a national organization comprising Indian film directors.

== Film release and distributions ==
The film was released in 1971.

The Mujibnagar Cabinet, along with some other exiled politicians, witnessed the first screening of Stop Genocide at a secret place in India. The acting Prime Minister Tajuddin Ahmad appreciated the documentary. Moreover, moved by the film, the Indian Prime Minister Indira Gandhi directed her film division to buy the film and distribute it internationally.

== Awards ==
Stop Genocide won an award in Tashkent film festival in 1972. It also won the SIDLOC award at the Delhi Film Festival in 1975.

== See also ==
- Major khaled's war
