= Shomi Kaiser =

Bangladeshi actress

- শমী কায়সার
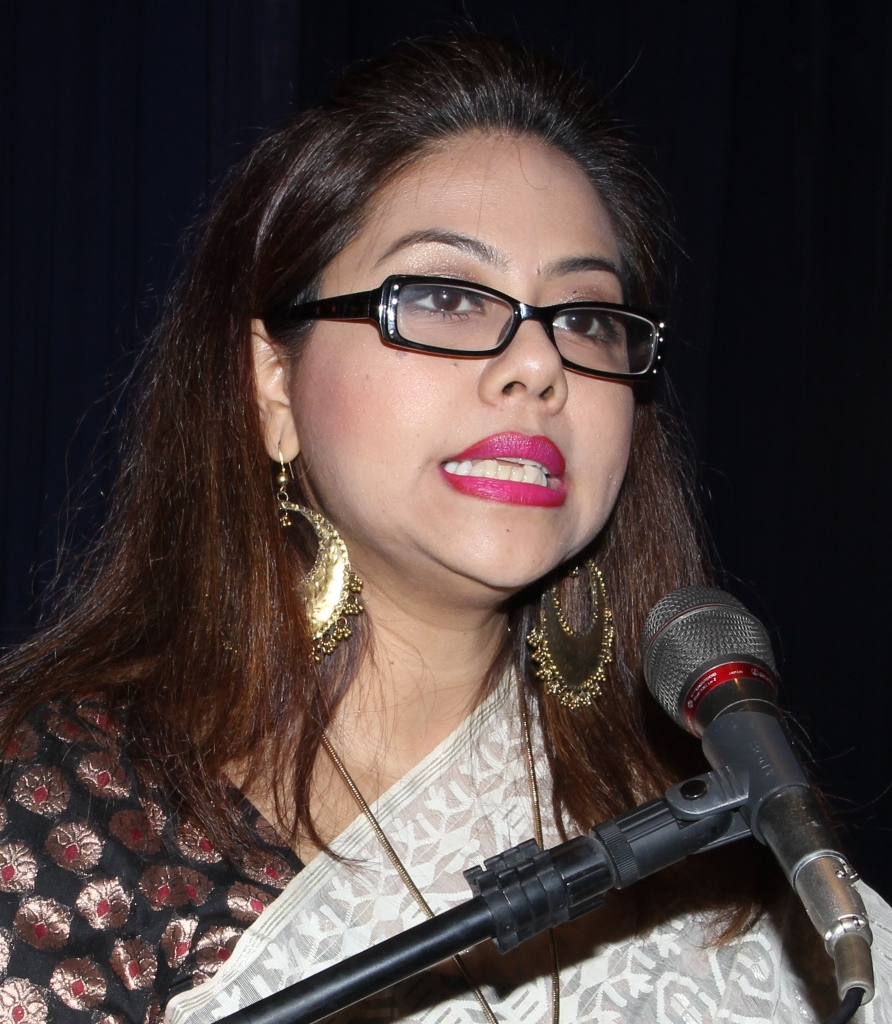
- Kaiser in 2016
- Born: 15 January 1970 (age 56)
- Occupations: Actress; model; producer
- Spouses: Riingo Banerjee (m. 1999; div. 2001); Mohammad A. Arafat (m. 2008; div. 2015); Reza Amin (m. 2020)
- Mother: Panna Kaiser
- Relatives: Amitav Kaiser (brother); Zahir Raihan (uncle)

Shomi Kaiser is a Bangladeshi actress and political activist. She is currently the managing director of Dhansiri Communications Ltd, an advertising and event management company.

== Early life and family ==
Kaiser was born to Shahidullah Kaiser and Panna Kaiser (née Saifunnahar Chowdhury) on 15 January 1970. She belongs to a Bengali family originally from the village of Majupur in Sonagazi, Feni District. Her grandfather, Mawlana Mohammad Habibullah, was a professor at the Calcutta Alia Madrasa and later the Dacca Alia Madrasa. Her father was a writer-novelist. Shomi Kaiser was two years old when her father was taken from home by Al Badr militia and Pakistani Army on 14 December 1971. His body was never found. Her mother, Panna Kaiser, was a writer and former M.P.

Shomi Kaiser has a younger brother, Amitav Kaiser. Their maternal uncle is former president of Bangladesh A. Q. M. Badruddoza Chowdhury, whose wife, Maya, is the sister of Panna Kaiser. Her cousin is Mahi B Chowdhury.

== Career ==
Shomi Kaiser received her first break In 1989, when director Atiqul Haque Chowdhury was looking for a young actress who could speak Noakhali dialect for his play Keba Apon Keba Por. Next she worked on the three episode play Joto Durey Jai, based on a novel by Imdadul Haque Milon, directed by Abdullah al Mamun. She worked for Dhaka Theatre for 12 years. She appeared in Haat Hodai (with Shahiduzzaman Selim). She appeared in such films as Hason Raja (2002) and Lalon (2004). She was featured in Ekti Nadir Naam (2002), based on the biography of filmmaker Ritwik Ghatak. She later emerged as a producer. She has owned Dhansiri Productions since 1997, which produced Mukti and Antorey Nirantor. In November 2013, her firm, Dhanshiri Communication Limited, got a license for a private radio channel named Radio Active.

In 2017, Kaiser was elected as one of the directors of Federation of Bangladesh Chambers of Commerce and Industry (FBCCI). In 2018, she was elected as the president of e-Commerce Association (e-CAB). At the aftermath of 2024 non-cooperation movement, she resigned from the position on 13 August 2024.

She was nominated in the election as a representative of the Sammilita Ganotantrik Parishad panel.

In November 2018, Kaiser applied for nomination for the Feni-3 constituency on behalf of Bangladesh Awami League party.

== Personal life ==
Kaiser has been married three times. Her first husband was Indian-Bengali film director Riingo Banerjee, whom she married in 1999 and divorced two years later. Her second husband, Mohammad A. Arafat, is a private university faculty member, whom she married in 2008 and divorced in 2015. In 2020, she married her third husband, Reza Amin, the chief executive officer of Euro-Vigil Private Limited.

== Criticism ==
Shomi Kaiser took a stand for the government during the repression of the Awami League government on the students in the quota reform movement that took place in 2024. During the movement, a group of pro-Awami artists, including Shomi Kaiser, were active against the movement in a WhatsApp group called 'Alo Ashbei' led by actor Ferdous. After the non-cooperation movement, on 3 September 2024, some screenshots related to that WhatsApp group were spread on social media. Shomi Kaiser went into hiding after the fall of Sheikh Hasina's government on 5 August 2024. She was arrested on 6 November 2024 by the police from a house in Sector-4 Uttara on murder chargers.

== Works ==
Telefilms

- Jatra Pother Golpo (2018)

Television plays

- Londoni Koinya - The bride from London (2000)
- Pratipaksha
- Onumoti Prarthona (2015)

Television serials

- Kon Kanoner Phul
- Nokkhotrer Raat
