= Titas Ekti Nadir Naam (novel) =

1956 novel by Advaita Mallabarman

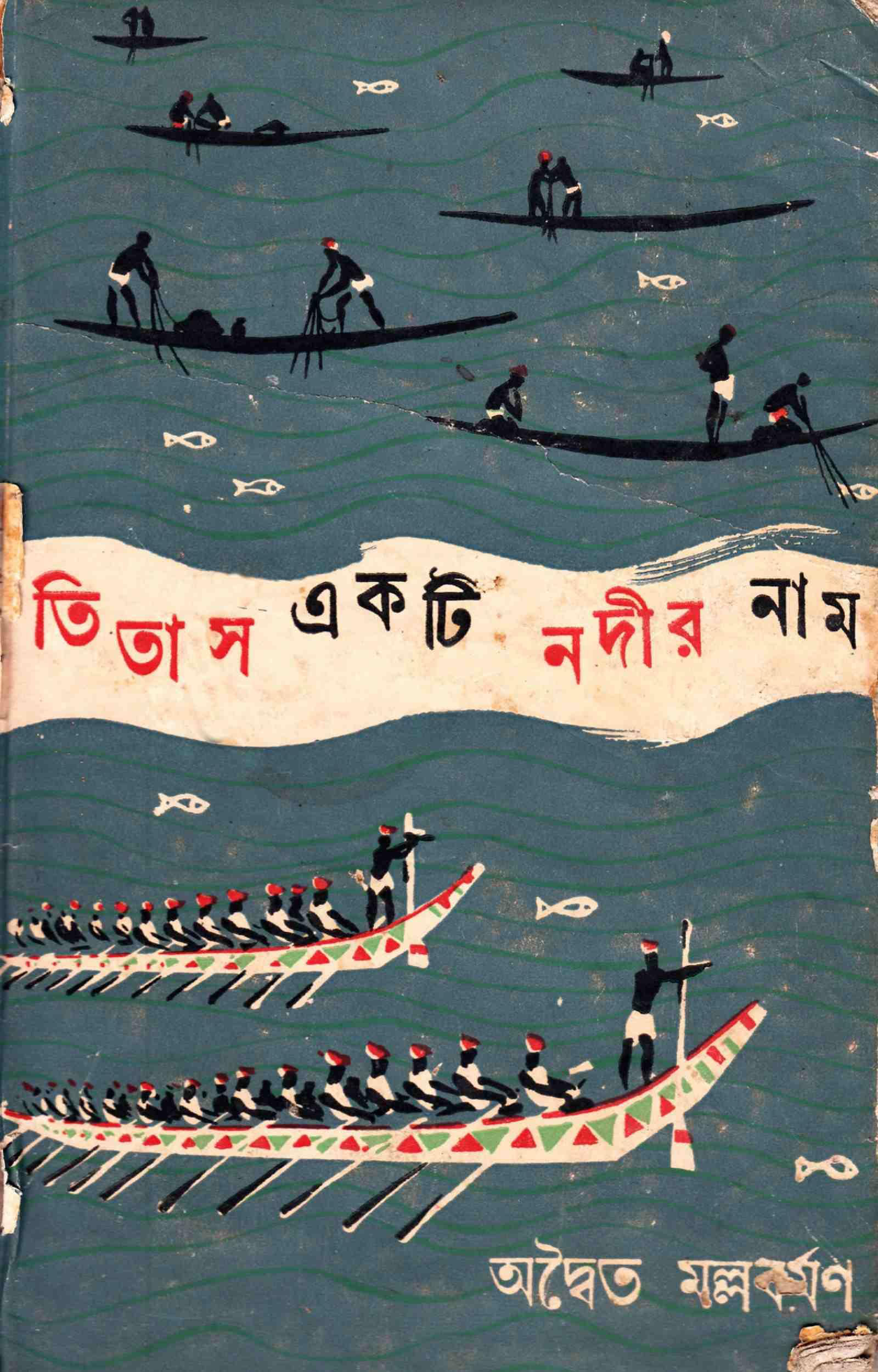
- First edition cover
- Author: Advaita Mallabarman
- Original title: তিতাস একটি নদীর নাম
- Cover artist: Ranen Ayan Dutta
- Language: Bengali
- Publication date: 1956
- Publication place: India

Titas Ekti Nadir Naam (lit. 'A river called Titas') is a novel by the Bengali author Adwaita Mallabarman. Completed in 1950, it was first serialized in the literary magazine Mohammadi and published posthumously as a book in 1956. The story follows the Malo fishing community (Jhalo Malo) of the Titas River, to which Adwaita belonged, as they are uprooted in the aftermath of the partition of India. Widely regarded as a classic, it was later adapted into a 1973 film by Ritwik Ghatak.

== History ==
In 1950, the novel was first serialized in The Mohammadi, a monthly literary magazine. After several chapters were published, Adwaita lost the original manuscript. At the request of friends and readers, he rewrote most of it while suffering from tuberculosis. Admitted to Kanchrapara Hospital, he entrusted the manuscript to his friends. He died in 1951. The novel was published posthumously in 1956, five years after his death.

== Synopsis ==
The novel is divided into 4 parts and each part has 2 sub-parts. That is, the novel is spread over a total of 8 parts.

In the village of Malopara on the banks of the perennial Titas River, two inseparable friends, Kishore and Subal, spend their youth fishing and participating in local traditions like the Maghmandal Vrata, where unmarried girls float colorful chouaris for boys to retrieve. During a trip to Shukdevpur, Kishore rescues a young woman during a riot at a festival and ends up marrying her. However, on their return journey, pirates abduct her, leaving Kishore driven to madness by grief. Unbeknownst to him, his wife survives by jumping overboard and eventually gives birth to their son, Ananta, while living under the protection of two elderly brothers in another village.

Years later, Ananta’s mother returns to Malopara seeking her husband's village but remains unrecognized as a widow. She eventually encounters the mad Kishore and, through devoted care, helps him regain his sanity. Their reunion is tragically brief; during a festival, a misunderstanding leads the villagers to beat Kishore to death, and his wife dies of heartbreak only four days later. Following their deaths, Ananta is cared for by the resilient Basanti—Subal’s widow—before being taken in by Banamali, a kind fisherman who encourages the boy’s education and moves him to Comilla.

As Ananta pursues a new life through studies, the Malo community faces a slow disintegration of their traditional culture and livelihood. The Titas River begins to dry up, and the emergence of silted land (chars) leads to violent conflicts with farmers and the loss of fishing grounds. Poverty and famine ravage the village, claiming the lives of village elders and Banamali. In the end, the once-vibrant Malo civilization fades away; Ananta transforms into an educated outsider, while a starving Basanti dies alone, dreaming of the river's lost glory as her water pot slips from her hand.
