= Vanya Kewley =

- Born: Vanya Sarah Kewley; 8 October 1937; Calcutta, India
- Died: 17 July 2012 (aged 74); Chelsea, London, England
- Education: Sorbonne
- Occupations: Documentary maker Journalist; Nurse
- Years active: 1965–1994
- Notable work: This Week
- Spouse: Michael Lambert (m. 2000; died 2004)

Vanya Sarah Kewley (8 November 1937 – 17 July 2012) was an Anglo-French journalist, documentary maker and nurse noted for her 1988 documentary film Tibet: A Case to Answer about the human rights situation in Tibet under Chinese rule. Born in Calcutta to a French mother and a British father, she moved to London to train as a nurse but did not have much enthusiasm about her career and began working as a researcher for Granada Television in 1965. Kewley had her first foreign assignment in 1969 and continued to be sent abroad for assignments and interviewed major world figures of the period. She moved to working on the ITV current affairs series This Week in 1972 and made several documentaries for the programme.

Kewley won her first award for a documentary about the South Korean human rights situations in 1977. She began planning Tibet: A Case to Answer in 1985 and the project was approved by Channel 4's commissioning editor David Lloyd. Kewley entered the country via a tourist group and initially shared amateur filming equipment with the cinematographer Sean Bobbitt before he became ill. She returned to Tibet three years later to film a follow-up but stopped film making after being diagnosed with Parkinson's disease in 1993. Kewley however returned to nursing and worked for the Red Cross in Bosnia and the United Nations High Commissioner for Refugees during the 1994 Rwandan genocide.

== Biography ==
=== Early life ===
Kewley was born on 8 November 1937 in Calcutta (now Kolkata), India. She was the daughter of a French mother and her British-born father Coleman Kewley was a diplomat. Kewley was handed her father's enthusiasm for studying comparative Asian religions and the Sanskrit language. She was educated in India, France and Switzerland primarily in Roman Catholic schools. Kewley read philosophy and history at the Sorbonne which was the historical house of the University of Paris. She left before her first year was completed and instead moved to London to train as a registered nurse, working at the Charing Cross Hospital's casualty department.

=== Career ===
Being somewhat discontented with nursing, Kewley started to write for the local London newspapers in her spare time before becoming ambitious over journalism on television. She later said of the start of her career, "I began knocking on every studio door I could find until someone asked me inside." Kewley joined Granada Television in 1965 as a researcher for the regional news programme, Scene at 6.30. She later became a producer and director on the current affairs programme World in Action between 1968 and 1971. In 1969, during her first foreign assignment and living without permission amongst "freedom fighters" Kewley was captured and beaten by soldiers while making a film about the problem of genocide in South Sudan. She narrowly avoided being raped by her captors. Kewley took a film crew into Nigeria in 1970 when the country was under civil war and secured an exclusive interview with the Biafran forces leader C. Odumegwu Ojukwu that same year. She also filmed Khaled Mosharraf and other Bangladeshi freedom fighters in East Pakistan in 1971.

Kewley switched to the ITV current affairs series This Week in 1972 and made several documentaries for the programme. This included an assignment to Vietnam during the war there where she contracted infective hepatitis and liver abscesses while filming in the country's jungle war areas and evaded fire from Vietcong forces. Kewley also made programmes about the 1972 Norwegian European Communities membership referendum and a fourteen-year-old boy imprisoned in Turkey on drug charges. That same year she became engaged to the journalist Richard Lindley but the marriage was later called off. Kewley interviewed the exiled spiritual leader of Tibet the 14th Dalai Lama at his home in the Himalayas for the 1975 film The Lama King and this formed a lifelong friendship. She had a spell with the BBC and partook in the religious and ethics series Anno Domini between 1975 and 1977 and Everyman from 1977 to 1978.

She also interviewed the leader of Libya Muammar Gaddafi in the film Soldier for Islam in 1976 (updated two years later). That same year, she revealed through her documentary Paradise Lost the widespread use of torture in Paraguay. She won her first prize at the Montreux Festival in 1977 for a documentary about the human rights situation in South Korea filmed two years earlier. The following year, Kewley was awarded the BBC Director General’s Award for Special Services to Television. She documented the resurgence of Islam in Saudi Arabia in 1979 in an ITV film called The Year of the Prophet and calculated what economic and political implications this would have for the Western world. Kewley investigated the issue of physical abuse of babies in the United Kingdom in the 1980 film Rosie's Story.

=== Tibet: A Case to Answer ===
In 1985, Kewley was disturbed over the human rights situation in Tibet and started to establish contacts in the country. She persuaded Channel 4's commissioning editor David Lloyd to fund the channel's most expensive documentary at the time, for the current affairs series Dispatches. Kewley entered Tibet with a guided tourist group and then deserted. She shared amateur filming equipment with the American cinematographer Sean Bobbitt but her plans were disintegrating after entering China on a three-month tourist visa as transport links were cancelled. Kewley joined Bobbitt in Chengdu as part of group touring the Tibetan capital Lhasa for five days and discovered that natives were outnumbered by Chinese citizens in their own country. Following more delays, she replaced her translator since she was concerned that he might be a collaborator and filmed interviews that divulged the human rights abuses by the ruling Chinese authorities.

Kewley filmed alone when Bobbitt left after becoming ill and continued her 4,000 miles (6,400 km) journey by van into the region's interior and discovered babies being born with deformities near a nuclear plant with one Chinese doctor admitting to performing enforced abortions and sterilisations. She persuaded a French mountaineer to smuggle the majority of the film footage out of Tibet before leaving on her own flight. The resulting film, Tibet: A Case to Answer, received much attention after its first broadcast on Channel 4 in 1988 and was repeated twice more in the following months. It was also specially shown to members of the Houses of Parliament, the United States Congress and the European Parliament. The film drew repeated protests from Beijing and Chinese ambassadors declined offers to debate the film live on air with Kewley. She also courted controversy by interviewing her subjects without disguises but she responded that she attempted to persuade the interviewees to hide their identifies but they chose not to. The 14th Dalai Lama became a friend as "she continued to travel once a year to India and Dharamsala – home in exile of the Dalai Lama, who was the subject of her 1975 film, The Lama King."

=== Later life and death ===
In 1990, Kewley's only book entitled Tibet: Behind the Ice Curtain was published. She returned to Tibet in 1991 by smuggling herself into the country across the Himalayas hidden beneath the floorboards of a van to create the follow-up to Tibet: A Case to Answer, entitled Voices from Tibet shown on Channel 4. Kewley revealed martial law was still present in Tibet despite claims from China that it had been ended. She stopped producing documentaries when she was diagnosed with Parkinson's disease in 1993. However Kewley returned to Charing Cross Hospital in the early 1990s to undertake a refresher course before travelling to perform work for the Red Cross in Bosnia and the United Nations High Commissioner for Refugees during the 1994 Rwandan genocide. She adopted and sponsored the education of two girls from Tibet and one boy from Rwanda. On 14 October 2000, Kewley married the soil scientist Michael Lambert and the marriage ended with Lambert's death from bone cancer four years later. She died of pneumonia and Parkinson's disease on 17 July 2012 at Chelsea and Westminster Hospital. Her adoptive children survive her.
