= Adwaita Mallabarman =

Indian writer

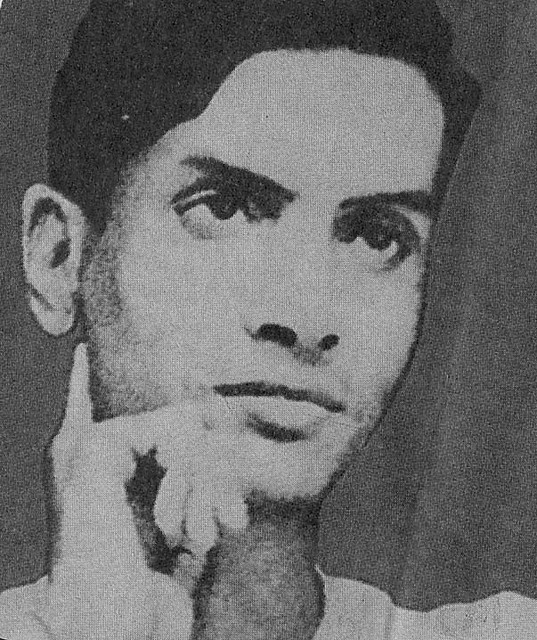
- Born: 1 January 1914; Brahmanbaria, Bengal Presidency, British India (present-day Comilla District, Bangladesh)
- Died: 16 April 1951 (aged 37); Narkeldanga, Calcutta, West Bengal, India
- Education: Comilla Victoria College
- Occupations: Literary editor, writer
- Works: Titash Ekti Nadir Naam (1956)

Adwaita Mallabarman (also spelled Advaita; 1 January 1914 – 16 April 1951) was a Bengali writer and journalist based in India. Today, he is best known for the novel, Titas Ekti Nadir Naam (A River Called Titas), which was published posthumously in 1956, following his death in 1951. He was briefly associated with Anandabazar Patrika, Yugantar and Desh.

== Early life and education ==
Mallabarman was born in a Malo family in Gokarnoghat village beside the Titash River, near Brahmanbaria town in, Comilla District of present-day Bangladesh, then in undivided Bengal in British India. He was the second of four children and lost his parents when he was a child. His two brothers died shortly after, and his sister (widowed soon after marriage) died before he went to Calcutta at the age of 20. As a boy and a teenager, until he left for college, he lived in the village with his uncle. He was the first child from the Malo community of the village and nearby area to finish school. Members of the Malo community collected subscriptions to support his school expenses (mainly books, since his school fees were either waived or covered by scholarships he received). He attended the town's elementary school and Annada High School. He matriculated from the school in 1933 and went on to Comilla Victoria College. In part because of financial difficulty, he left college in 1934 and went to Calcutta to work as a literary editor.

== Career ==
Throughout his teen years he wrote prodigiously, mostly poetry, and published in student magazines. Those early writings were highly acclaimed, so much so that peers who aspired to be writers sought his opinion on their work before sending it to a publisher.

Mallabarman's first job in Calcutta was as assistant editor of a literary and news magazine, Navashakti. After three years with the magazine, he worked as an editorial assistant for a literary monthly, Mohammadi, in which he also published a number of his poems and parts of what was evidently the first draft of Titash Ekti Nadir Naam (it is also filmed by Ritwik Ghatak); he continued to work for Mohammadi until its Muslim publisher closed the monthly and emigrated from India. During this period he also worked for the newspaper Azad. In 1945, he joined the literary weekly Desh and the daily Ananda Bazar Patrika. From 1945 through 1950 a number of his poems, stories, essays, and translations were published in Desh and other magazines.

== Death ==
In 1950, Mallabarman was diagnosed with tuberculosis. he had felt increasingly unwell for two years. Entrusting the just-finalized manuscript of Titash Ekti Nadir Naam to friends, he went for hospital treatment. Soon after his release he suffered a relapse and was readmitted. Before the second phase of his treatment was over, however, he walked out of the hospital. Two months later, on 16 April 1951, he died.
