= Nacher Putul =

1971 film directed by Ashok Ghosh

- VCD Cover
- Bengali: নাচের পুতুল
- Directed by: Ashok Ghosh
- Written by: Jahirul Haque (dialogue)
- Screenplay by: Jahirul Haque
- Story by: Ahmad Zaman Chowdhury
- Produced by: Azizur Rahman
- Starring: Razzak; Shabnam; Sultana Zaman; Rani Sarkar; Khan Jaynul
- Cinematography: Abdul Latif Khan; Arun Roy
- Edited by: Bashir Hossain
- Music by: Robin Ghosh
- Production company: Rana Films
- Distributed by: Anis Films
- Release date: 8 January 1971
- Running time: 107 minutes
- Country: Pakistan
- Language: Bengali

Nacher Putul (Bengali: নাচের পুতুল) is a Bengali-language Pakistani drama film, directed by Ashok Ghosh. Story by Ahmed Zaman Chowdhury and script and dialogue by Jahirul Haque. The film was produced by Azizur Rahman under the banner of Rana Films. The film stars Razzak and Shabnam played in the lead role. The music was composed by Robin Ghosh (brother of Ashok Ghosh and husband of Shabnam). Khan Zainul, Sultana Zaman, Rani Sarkar, Inam Ahmed and Kazi Mehfuzul Haq also starred in the supporting roles.

== Cast ==
- Shabnam - Laila
- Razzak - Firoz
- Khan Joynul - Kamal, brother of Laila
- Sultana Zaman - Shirin, Feroze's sister
- Rani Sarkar - Nina
- Supriya - Rubina
- Sabita - Feroze's sister
- Narayan Chakraborty - Laila's father
- Kazi Mehfuzul Haque - Feroze's elder brother
- Inam Ahmed - Nina's father
- Anis - Ruby's father
- Tejen Chakraborty
- Kamal
- Shathi Khandaker
- Master Tarek - Bablu, Laila's younger brother
- Master Nipu - Shopkeeper

== Music ==
The film music is directed by Robin Ghosh. The soundtrack for the film is composed by Mohammad Moniruzzaman, KG Mustafa and Ahmed Zaman Chowdhury. The film singer are Sabina Yasmin, Abdul Jabbar, Mahmudunnabi and Shimul Yusuf.

=== Track list ===
No.	Title	Writer(s)	Singer(s)	Length
1.	"Nacher Putul"	Mohammad Moniruzzaman and Ahmed Zaman Choudhury	Abdul Jabbar	3:29
2.	"Ainate Oi Mukh Dekhbe Jokhon"	Mohammad Moniruzzaman and KG Mustafa	Mahmudunnabi	3:49
3.	"Janina Ki Kore"	Mohammad Moniruzzaman	Sabina Yasmin
4.	"O Nadi O Akash"	Mohammad Moniruzzaman	Sabina Yasmin
