= Panna Kaiser =

Bangladeshi politician (1950–2023)

- পান্না কায়সার

Member of the Bangladesh Parliament for Women's Reserved Seat–27
- In office 14 July 1996 – 13 July 2001
- Succeeded by: Selima Rahman

Personal details
- Born: Saifunnahar Chowdhury; 25 May 1950 Barura Upazila, Comilla District, East Bengal, Dominion of Pakistan
- Died: 4 August 2023 (aged 73) Dhaka, Bangladesh
- Party: Bangladesh Awami League
- Spouse: Shahidullah Kaiser (m. 1969; he disappeared in 1971)
- Children: Shomi; Amitav
- Relatives: AQM Badruddoza Chowdhury (brother-in-law)

Panna Kaiser (25 May 1950 – 4 August 2023) was a Bangladesh Awami League politician and a member of Jatiya Sangsad selected for the women's reserved seats during 1996–2001. She was awarded 2021 Bangla Academy Literary Award in the research on liberation war category.

== Early life and career ==
Panna Kaiser was born Saifunnahar Chowdhury on 25 May 1950 to Mosleh Uddin Chowdhury and Mendia Khatun Chowdhury. She completed her master's in Bengali literature from the University of Dhaka in 1969. In 1996, she was selected as one of the 30 reserved seats for women to serve as a member of parliament. She contributed to a child organization named Khelaghar and engaged in various social activities, cultural events and writeups.

== Personal life and death ==
Chowdhury married Shahidullah Kaiser, a writer and a journalist on 17 February 1969. He was abducted forever from his home on 14 December 1971 by the paramilitary Al-Badr. Her daughter, Shomi Kaiser, is an actress, and her son, Amitav Kaiser, a banker.

Panna Kaiser died in Dhaka on 4 August 2023, at the age of 73.

== Awards ==
- Bangla Academy Literary Award (2021)
