= Jibon Theke Neya =

Taken from life
- Bengali: জীবন থেকে নেয়া
- Directed by: Zahir Raihan
- Written by: Zahir Raihan; Amjad Hossain
- Produced by: Zahir Raihan
- Starring: Shuchanda; Razzak; Rosy; Shawkat Akbar
- Cinematography: Afzal Chowdhury
- Edited by: Maloy Banerjee
- Music by: Khan Ataur Rahman; Altaf Mahmud
- Distributed by: Anees Films Corporation
- Release date: 10 April 1970 (East Pakistan)
- Running time: 133 minutes
- Country: East Pakistan
- Language: Bengali

Jibon Theke Neya (lit. 'Taken from Life') is a 1970 Bengali-language East-Pakistani (now Bangladesh) film directed by Zahir Raihan. It has been described as an example of "national cinema", using discrete local traditions to build a representation of the Bangladeshi national identity.

== Plot ==
The film tells the story of a middle-class family led by an authoritarian elder sister known as Apa. The other family members are her two younger brothers, Anis and Farooq, and her husband, Dulabhai. However, nobody else in the family has a say in household matters — Apa makes all the decisions. Her husband is not allowed to sing inside the house, her brothers are not permitted to marry, and she verbally abuses the servants day and night. In an attempt to put an end to her autocratic rule, Dulabhai secretly marries Anis to a woman named Sathi. Apa's oppression is turned on her. Meanwhile, Farooq falls for Sathi's younger sister, Bithi, and marries her. Sathi and Bithi's older brother, Anwar, is a political activist who has been imprisoned for his involvement in the freedom movement. Conversely, under the leadership of Sathi and Bithi, everyone in the house becomes united. Family members paste posters on the wall denouncing Apa's dictatorship. The bunch of keys that symbolises control of the household is given to the two sisters. Losing her power, Apa starts to conspire against the sisters. Both Sathi and Bithi have two children. Sathi gives birth to a stillborn child. The doctor fears that she may not be able to cope with her grief. So Bithi's baby is placed in her lap. Thinking it is her own child, Sathi begins to nurture it. Apa starts a dispute between the two sisters. Tactically, she poisons Bithi and frames Sathi. Although Bithi recovers, Sathi is arrested for the poisoning. When the case is heard in court, Dulabhai proves that Apa is the main culprit. Ultimately, the autocratic elder sister is imprisoned. Mr Anwar is released, and he, his sisters, and their husbands go to the Shaheed Minar to pay tribute to the martyrs.

== Cast ==
- Shuchanda as Bithi
- Razzak as Farooq
- Rosy as Sathi
- Shawkat Akbar as Anis
- Rawshan Jamil as Apa
- Khan Ataur Rahman as Dulabhai
- Anwar Hossain as Mr Anwar
- Amjad Hossain as Modhu
- Baby Zaman as Ghotok

== Production ==
The film was originally titled Tinjon meye o ek peyala bish (lit. 'Three Girls and a Cup of Poison'). At the request of film producer Anis Dosani, Zaheer Raihan took over the responsibility of making the film. Zaheer Raihan decided that in the story of the film, one sister will poison another sister. Writer Amjad Hossain could not accept this story because he thought that making a film with such a story would not be popular with audiences. However, instead of writing the story as per the words of Zaheer Raihan, Amjad Hossain continued to write the story as his own. Amjad Hossain later said in an interview with Prothom Alo that he could not write the story as directed by the director as he could not continue making a documentary film about Amanullah Asaduzzaman due to government objections.

Shooting for the film began on 1 February 1970, but some scenes were recorded a year earlier. Pakistan's military government had repeatedly tried to stop the film. The government threatened the film's director and actor Razzak. The director also received death threats for this film. Film maker Alamgir Kabir attributed the film's uneven production quality to threats to ban it and to the haste with which it was made. Filming was compressed into about 25 shooting days, as little as a third of what was typical in Pakistan at that time.

== Music ==
Jibon Theke Neya

Soundtrack album by Sabina Yasmin, Khan Ataur Rahman, Ajit Roy, Mahmudun Nabi, Nilufar Yasmin, Khandaker Farooq Ahmed and others
- Released: 1970
- Genre: Film music
- Language: Bengali

Khan Ataur Rahman was the music director of this film. Although the use of Tagore songs was banned by the information minister of Pakistan, Khwaja Shahabuddin, in 1967, a song by Rabindranath Tagore has been used in the film in defiance of that ban.

Jibon Theke Neya Soundtrack – Track listing
No.	Title	Lyrics	Singers	Length
1.	"Eki Sonar Aloy"		Sabina Yasmin
2.	"E Khacha Bhangbo Ami"		Khan Ataur Rahman
3.	"Amar Sonar Bangla"	Rabindranath Tagore	Ajit Roy, Mahmudun Nabi, Sabina Yasmin, Nilufar Yasmin
4.	"Karar Oi Louho Kopat"	Kazi Nazrul Islam	Ajit Roy, Khandaker Farooq Ahmed and others
5.	"Amar Bhaiyer Rokte Rangano"	Abdul Gaffar Chowdhury

== Release ==
The film was not released on the scheduled date due to government restrictions. As the film was not released, the people of East Pakistan staged protests and demonstrations in various places. So the government cleared the film and released it. The government banned the film after it was released. The military junta later lifted the ban on the film in the face of protests. The film was shown in East Pakistani cinemas for about six months. The film was also screened in Kolkata, capital of Indian Bengal in 1971.

== Reception ==
=== Critical reception ===
Satyajit Ray, Mrinal Sen, Ritwik Ghatak and Tapan Sinha praised the film. Exactly one month after the release of the film, film journalist Ahmed Zaman Chowdhury wrote in the weekly Chitrali magazine, "Zahir has the ease of editing a film, but lacks overall skills. As a result, there is not always an equation of how long a shot will last. So the application ends before it is spread." According to Bidhan Biberu, the film was able to represent the then Bengali society of Pakistan. Criticizing the film, Alamgir Kabir said that the character of the elder sister in the film is arranged in the style of Ayub Khan and the family shown in the film is compared with the politics of Pakistan at that time. However, according to him, such a family is not realistic in the true sense. He noted that many scenes showed in the film were not perfect.
