= Kalim Sharafi =

Bangladeshi singer (1924-2010)

- কলিম শরাফী
- Born: 8 May 1924; Birbhum, West Bengal, British India
- Died: 2 November 2010 (aged 86); Dhaka, Bangladesh
- Resting place: Martyred Intellectuals’ Graveyard, Mirpur
- Spouses: Kamela Khatun (m. 1949; div. 1957); Noushaba Khatun (m. 1967)
- Awards: Ekushey Padak 1985; Independence Award 1999

Kalim Sharafi (8 May 1924 – 2 November 2010) was a Bangladeshi Rabindra Sangeet singer. He joined at Indian independence movement. He gave his ideas in several publications regarding politics, culture, and Tagore. He is regarded as one of the best Rabindra Sangeet singers in the subcontinent.

== Early life ==
Sharafi was born in Birbhum district of West Bengal on 8 May 1924. He was the only son of three children. He had two younger sisters. He was from a pir family, a tradition against music, and they came from Sonargaon. He was first influenced by his father who was a singer. His passion for music blossomed at an early age as he came across with renowned artists of pre-independent India. He said, "As a child I used to find Rabindranath's compositions naturally melodic and heart touching and would grasp them easily".

== Politics ==
Sharafi was involved in politics at the age of 18 as he joined the Quit India movement in 1942. Consequently, he was arrested by the police from his village and spent more than a year in prison with other activists. It was in prison that his passion for Rabindranath Tagore was rekindled. During this period of his life, he became a member of Popular Theatre Association, which in Bengali is referred to as Bharatiyo Gononatya Shangha. He was important in breaking down barriers that prevented women from becoming involved in theater.

As a result of his beliefs in communism, he was banned from the state-run radio Bangladesh Betar, which hurt his musical career. During the Bangladesh Language Movement, Tagore was also banned.

== Career ==
Sharafi co-directed the 1962 film Sonar Kajol along with Zahir Raihan. Sharafi was a program director at Pakistan Television Corporation between 1964 and 1967. From 1969 and 1972, he was general manager of the Pakistan Gramophone Company Ltd. Sharafi also worked in Bangladesh Textile Mills Corporation between 1974 and 1976. He was also the founder principal of the music school Sangeet Bhaban in 1983 in Dhaka, Bangladesh. He served as the president of the "Bangladesh Rabindra Sangeet Shilpi Sangstha".

== Family ==
Sharafi first married stage actress Kamela Sharafi (née Khatun) in 1949 and got divorced in 1957. Later in 1963, he married Noushaba Khatun, a then faculty member at the department of psychology of the University of Dhaka. From the two marriages, he had one son and four daughters in total.

== Death ==
Sharafi died at his residence on 2 November 2010 at the age of 86. He was buried in the Martyred Intellectuals' Graveyard.

== Honors ==
Sharafi was awarded Ekushey Padak in 1985 and Independence Day Award in 1999. He received the first Rabindra Award 2010 for his contribution in promoting and preserving Rabindra Sangeet.
