= Behula (1966 film) =

1966 Pakistani Bengali-language film

- বেহুলা
- Directed by: Zahir Raihan
- Starring: Razzak; Shuchanda; Sumita Devi
- Music by: Satya Saha
- Release date: 1966
- Country: Pakistan
- Language: Bengali

Behula (Bengali: বেহুলা) is a 1966 Bengali film directed by Zahir Raihan and stars Razzak and Shuchanda as lead pair. It was based on the Bengali Hindu mythology of Behula, who fights vehemently to goddess Manasa for her husband Lakhindar's life. The director was searching for a suitable hero for the character Lakhindar, he auditioned for many a man. Razzak came to give audition with a beard unshaved for seven days. This proved lucky for him as he was selected by the director. It is one of the six films where Razzak and Shuchanda shared screen time.

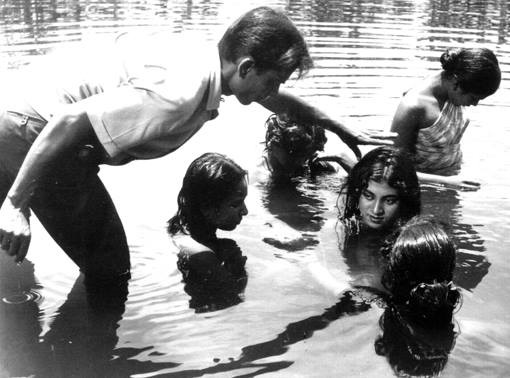
Zahir Raihan during a shooting scene of the film
