= Anwara (film) =

Pakistani film

- Anwara movie poster
- Produced by: Iftekharul Alam Kislu
- Starring: Razzak; Suchonda
- Release date: 1967
- Country: Pakistan
- Language: Bengali

Anwara is a 1967 Pakistani film which stars Razzak and Suchonda in lead roles. It was one of the six films where Razzak and Suchonda shared screen time.
