= Nawab Sirajuddaula (film) =

- Poster
- নবাব সিরাজউদ্দৌল্লা
- Directed by: Khan Ataur Rahman
- Starring: Anwar Hossain; Anwara Begum
- Cinematography: Baby Islam
- Music by: Khan Ataur Rahman
- Release date: 12 January 1967
- Country: East Pakistan
- Language: Bengali

Nawab Sirajuddaula is a 1967 Bengali language Pakistani biographical film which details the life of Nawab of Bengal Siraj ud-Daulah (1733–1757) and the Battle of Plassey (1757). Khan Ataur Rahman was the director and screenwriter of the film. It was entered into the 6th Moscow International Film Festival.

In 1974, a reviewer for the Quarterly Journal published by the National Centre for the Performing Arts called it as commercial as Indian films of the time and found it "disappointing because of its incompetent direction and decor".

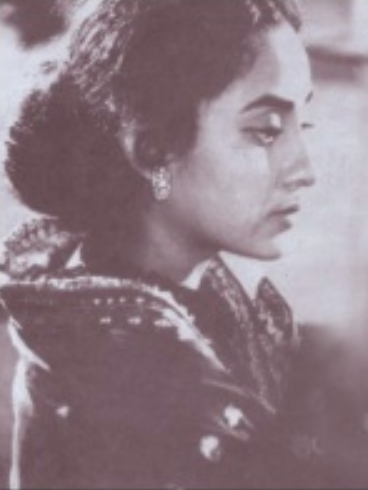
Actress Anwara Begum in a scene.

== Cast ==
- Anwar Hossain - Nawab Sirajuddaula
- Anwara Begum - Aleya

== Music ==
- Abdul Alim
- Abdul Jabbar
- Ferdausi Rahman
- Shahnaz Rahmatullah
- Shaheen Samad
- Sabina Yasmin
