= Khan Ataur Rahman =

Bangladeshi actor, director, producer, writer, composer and singer (1928–1997)

- খান আতাউর রহমান
- Born: 11 December 1928; Singair, Manikganj, Bengal Presidency, British India
- Died: 1 December 1997 (aged 68); Dhaka, Bangladesh
- Other names: Tara, Anis, Khan Ata
- Education: Dhaka College; University of Dhaka
- Occupations: Actor, film director, composer, singer
- Years active: 1963–1997
- Spouses: Shirley Wheaton (divorced); Mahbuba Rahman; Nilufar Yasmin (m. 1968)
- Children: 3, including Agun

Khan Ataur Rahman (known as Khan Ata; 11 December 1928 – 1 December 1997) was a Bangladeshi film actor, director, producer, screenplay writer, composer, and singer, best known for his role in the film Jibon Theke Neya (1970). He received the Bangladesh National Film Award for Best Screenplay for the films Sujon Sokhi (1975) and Danpite Chhele (1980). He was awarded Ekushey Padak posthumously in 2003 by the Government of Bangladesh.

== Early life and education ==
The son of Ziarat Hossain Khan and Zohra Khatun, who lived in Singair Upazila, Manikganj District, Ataur Rahman was born on 11 December 1928. When he was a student in class three, he won the first prize of the Dhaka Zilla Music Competition. He rendered the song Mon paban-er dinga baiyya.

Ataur Rahman attended Dhaka Collegiate School, Dhaka College, and Dhaka University, completing a Bachelor of Science degree. Ataur Rahman was extremely obsessed with films. After enrolling in Dhaka Medical College, a career he later decided not to pursue, he made an attempt to escape from the family home and join the film industry. He had only Taka 60 in his possession at the time. His brother-in-law spotted Ataur Rahman in the Rail Station and he was forced to return home.

As a result of Ataur Rahman's bohemian attitudes, he left Dhaka University in 1949 and ran away from home for the second time. This time he went to Bombay (present-day Mumbai). He started frequented the film industry and slept on the side walks. He met Jyoti Studio's cameraman Jal Irani, who gave Ataur Rahman the chance to work as an apprentice but it was not satisfying enough for him.

== Career ==
In 1950, Ataur Rahman went to Karachi and took a job as a News Presenter for Radio Pakistan. Here he met with another notable Bengali media personality, Foteh Lohani. At this time, Ata started taking music lessons from renowned Pakistani Sarnagi player Jawahari Khan. After some days Foteh Lohani moved to London. In 1952, Khan Ata went to London as well. There he performed as a singer and actor in several Bengali programs. He met with artist SM Sultan and helped him with his savings to buy art supplies. Ataur Rahman and his companions also made arrangements for displaying and selling Sultan's paintings.

In 1953, Ataur Rahman enrolled in the Theatre department at City Literary Institute. Ataur Rahman studied in the Netherlands when he was awarded a UNESCO fellowship in 1954. Thereafter, he worked as a teacher in London but also took to the stage for several years. In 1956, he returned home and starred in a film called Jago Hua Severa directed by AJ Karder. He played many roles with notable Bengali actress Tripti Mitra.

In 1963, Ataur Rahman made his directorial debut with the film Anek Diner Chena, and continued making many notable films like Nawab Sirajuddaula (1967), Sat Bhai Champa (1968), Arun Barun Kironmala (1968), Abar Tora Manush Ho (1973), Sujon Sokhi (1975), Ekhono Onek Raat (1997).

In addition to acting, Ataur Rahman was a songwriter with over 500 compositions, some of which remain popular.

== Personal life ==
Ataur Rahman married three times. When he was in London, completing a higher course in Cinematography, he met an English woman named Shirley and married her. On their return to Bangladesh and after having a child, they got divorced. Shirley returned to London with the child. Then Khan Ata married Mahbuba Rahman. They met in a radio station. They had a daughter named Rumana Islam, a Bangladeshi singer. In 1968, Ataur Rahman married Nilufar Yasmin, a Bangladeshi singer. They had a son, Agun (b. 1971), who is also a Bangladeshi singer.

== Filmography ==
=== As director ===
- Anek Diner Chena (1964)
- Raja Sanyasi (1966)
- Nawab Sirajuddaula (1967, Bengali/Urdu)
- Sat Bhai Champa (1967)
- Soye Nadia Jage Pani (1968, Urdu)
- Joar Bhata (1969)
- Arun Barun Kiranmala (1969)
- Sukdukha (1973)
- Abar Tora Manush Ho (1973)
- Sujon Sokhi (1975)
- Din Jay Kotha Thake (1979)
- Arshinagar (1987)
- Parash Pathar (1987)
- Ekhono Onek Raat (1997)

=== As actor ===
- Jago Hua Savera (1959, as Anis)
- Ei Desh Tomar Amar (1959)
- Je Nadi Maro Pothey (1961)
- Kokhono Asheni (1961)
- Kancher Deyal (1963)
- Nawab Sirajuddaula (1967, Bengali/Urdu)
- Sat Bhai Champa (1967)
- Moner Moto Bou (1969)
- Jibon Theke Neya (1970)
- Abar Tora Manush Ho (1973)
- Sujon Sokhi (1975)
- Chhutir Ghonta (1980)
- Choto Bou (1990)

=== As composer ===
- Ei Desh Tomar Amar (1959)
- Kokhono Asheni (1961)
- Kancher Deyal (1963)
- Sangam (1964, Urdu)
- Bahana (1965, Urdu)
- Nawab Sirajuddaula (1967, Bengali/Urdu)
- Soye Nadia Jage Pani (1968, Urdu)
- Arun Barun Kironmala (1969)
- Joar Bhata (1969)
- Moner Moto Bou (1969)
- Jibon Theke Neya (1970)
- Abar Tora Manush Ho (1973)
- Sujon Sokhi (1975)

== Awards ==
- Pakistan Film Festival Award
- Nigar Award
- International film festival awards at Moscow and Tashkent
- Bangladesh National Film Award for Best Screenplay
- Bangladesh National Film Award for Best Lyrics (1980)
- Ekushey Padak (2003)
