= Sumita Devi =

Bangladeshi film actress (1936–2004)

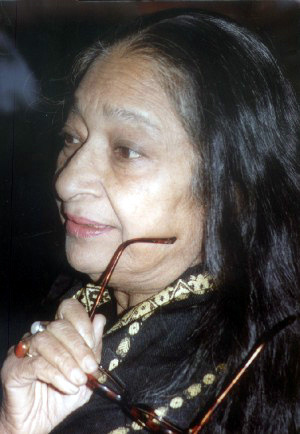
- Born: Hena Bhattacharya; 2 February 1936; Manikganj District, Bengal Presidency, British India
- Died: 6 January 2004 (aged 67); Dhaka, Bangladesh
- Other name: Nilufar Begum
- Occupations: Actress, filmmaker
- Spouses: Amulya Lahiri; Zahir Raihan (m. 1962; div. 1968)

Sumita Devi (Bengali: সুমিতা দেবী) (born Hena Bhattacharya) also known as Nilufar Begum (February 2, 1936 - January 6, 2004) was a Bangladeshi actress. In 45 years of her career, she acted in around 200 films and 150 radio and television dramas. She was an artist at the Swadhin Bangla Betar Kendra in 1971.

== Early life and career ==
Devi was born in Manikganj District in the then Bengal Presidency. She moved with her parents, first to Dhaka in 1944, then to Calcutta in 1951. She debuted her acting in the film Asiya (1960). She was the first actress of the then East Pakistan to act in the film Dhupchhaya produced in West Pakistan. Later she produced five films.

== Works ==
Actress

- Akash Aar Mati (1959)
- Ei Desh Tomar Amar (1959)
- Matir Pahar (1959)
- Asiya (1960)
- Kakhono Asheni (1961)
- Kancher Deyal (1963)
- Sonar Kajal (1962)
- Ei To Jiban (1964)
- Dui Diganta (1964)
- Sangam (1964)
- Behula (1966)
- Agun Niye Khela (1967)
- Abhishap (1967)
- Ora Egaro Jon (1972)
- Amar Janma Bhumi

Producer

- Agun Niye Khela (1967)
- Momer Alo (1968)
- Mayar Sangsar (1969)
- Adarsha Chapakhana (1970)
- Notun Probhat (1970)

== Personal life and death ==
Devi's first marriage to Amulya Lahiri was short. Later she married filmmaker Zahir Raihan in 1962. Upon marriage she converted to Islam and took the name Nilufar Begum. With Raihan, she had two sons, Anal and Bipul. She had another son and a daughter. After the disappearance of Raihan in 1972, the government allotted an abandoned house on 7.5 kathas in Mohammadpur Thana to Devi.

Devi died from a brain haemorrhage on 6 January 2004 at Bangladesh Medical Hospital in Dhaka. Both her kidneys and liver had been malfunctioning before she was admitted to the hospital. She had been in a coma since her treatment began.

== Awards ==
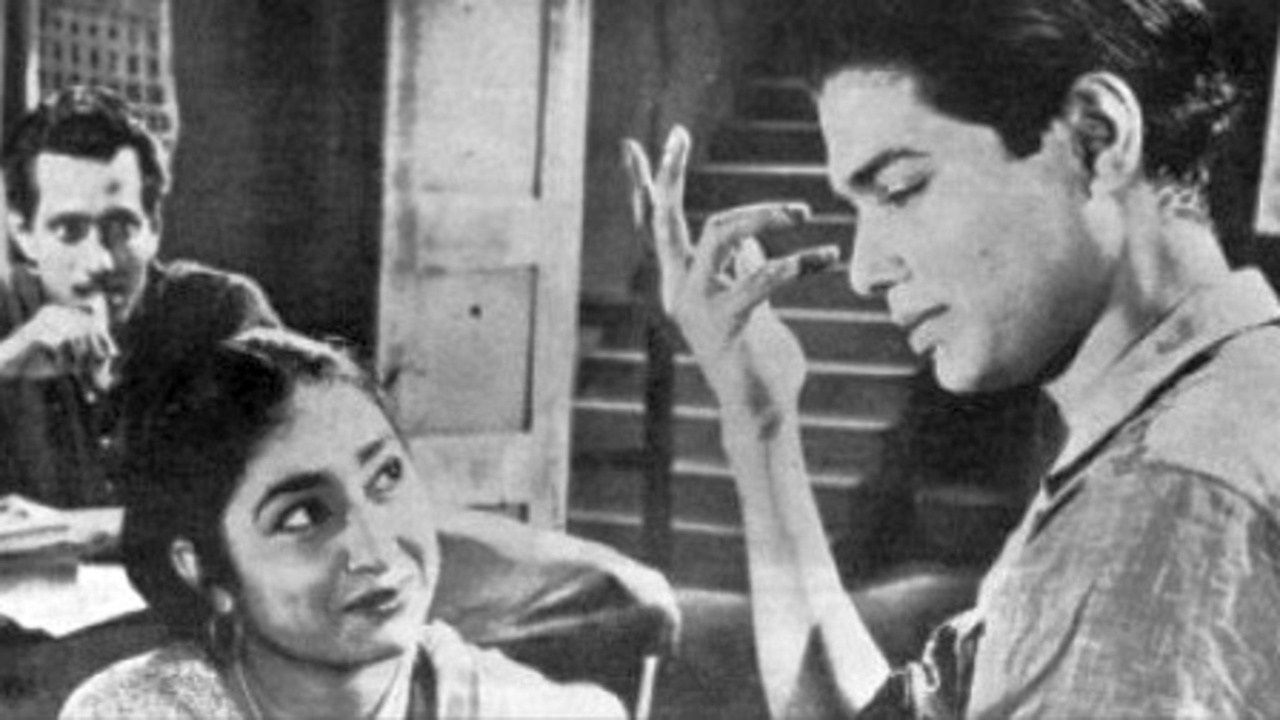
Devi in the film Kancher Deyal (1963)

- All Pakistan Critic Award (1962)
- Nigar Award for Best Supporting Actress (1964)
- Bangladesh Film Journalist Association Award
- Television Reporters Association of Bangladesh Award
- Agartala Muktijoddha Award (2002)
- Janakantha Gunijan and Pratibha Sammanona (2002)
