= Sangam (1964 Urdu film) =

1964 film

- Directed by: Zahir Raihan
- Produced by: Iftekharul Alam Kislu
- Starring: Rosy; Haroon; Sumita; Khalil
- Cinematography: Afzal Chowdhury
- Music by: Khan Ataur Rahman
- Release date: 23 April 1964
- Country: Pakistan
- Language: Urdu

Sangam is a Pakistani Urdu film released in 1964. Directions by Zahir Raihan. It is stars Rosy Afsari, Haroon, Sumita Devi, Khalil. It was the first full-length colour movie made in Pakistan.

== Cast ==
- Rosy
- Haroon
- Sumita
- Khalil

== Production ==
The film was made in Bengali-speaking East Pakistan, and Raihan and much of the cast and crew were from there, but for commercial reasons it was produced in Urdu.

Raihan's decision to film in colour was influenced by the first colour laboratory in Pakistan being located in Dacca, at the fledgling government-run East Pakistan Film Development Corporation.

Most of the film was shot on location in the Chittagong Hill Tracts. Kaptai Lake and its surrounding hills feature prominently.

Raihan finished editing the film by early January 1964. Then he began dubbing and re-recording, while Khan Ataur Rahman went to Karachi to record the background music.

Sangam was produced and directed by Zahir Raihan. It was released on Eid-ul-Azha Day, 23 April 1964.

== Music ==
Khan Ataur Rahman composed the musical scores.

== Reception ==
In the Illustrated Weekly of Pakistan Barlas wrote that the film "advocates a refreshing, optimistic approach and attitude to the problems of life." Barlas praised the colour photography and described Raihan's direction as "very successful in the light and romantic scenes".
