= Moner Moto Bou =

East Pakistani film

- Poster
- Directed by: Rahim Nawaz
- Starring: Razzak; Suchonda; Khan Ataur Rahman; Sultana Zaman
- Music by: Khan Ataur Rahman
- Release date: 1969
- Country: Pakistan
- Language: Bengali

Moner Moto Bou ("A wife-like mind") is a 1969 East Pakistani film directed by Rahim Nawaz and starring Razzak and Suchonda as lead pair. A remake of the 1966 Bengali film Shankha Bela, it also stars Khan Ataur Rahman and Sultana Zaman. It is one of the six films where Razzak and Suchonda shared screen time.

== Music ==
The film's music was composed and written by Khan Ataur Rahman and Bashir Ahmad's song "Amake Porate Jodi Eto Lage Bhalo" went on to become a cult hit.

- "Amake Porate Jodi Eto Lage Bhalo" - Bashir Ahmad
