= Rosy Afsari =

Bangladeshi actress (1946–2007)

Rosy Afsary
- রোজী আফসারী
- Afsari in Titash Ekti Nadir Naam (1973)
- Born: Shamima Akter Rosy; 20 April 1946; Lakshmipur, Bengal Presidency, British India
- Died: 9 March 2007 (aged 60); Dhaka, Bangladesh
- Occupation: Actress
- Years active: 1967–2004
- Spouses: Abdus Samad (m. 1965, d. 1986); Malek Afsary (m. 1987)
- Children: Kobita Samad
- Relatives: Wasim (brother-in-law)
- Awards: National Film Award, Bachsas Awards

Rosy Afsary (Bengali: রোজী আফসারী, Bengali pronunciation: [rodʒi afsaɾi]; 23 April 1946 – 9 March 2007), also known as Rosy Samad, was an actress in the Bangladeshi film industry. She was awarded the Bangladesh National Film Award for Best Supporting Actress in its first ceremony in 1975 for her role in the film Lathial.

== Career ==
Afsary started her career in 1964 through Eito Jibon film. She appeared in over 200 Bengali films and always played a positive sad role. She also acted in 25 Urdu films. She was President of Zia Sangskritik Parishad (Zisus).

== Personal life ==
Afsary was first married to filmmaker Abdus Samad on December 27, 1965. They divorced on May 5, 1986. Then in 1987, she married filmmaker Malek Afsary and changed her surname to Rosy Afsary. Her sister Parveen Ahmed Ruhi (died 2003) was the wife of veteran Actor Washim.

== Filmography ==
- All films are in Bengali-language, unless otherwise noted.

Year	Film title	Role	Notes	Ref.
1964	Eito Jibon		Debut film	
1964	Bandhan		Debut Urdu film	
1964	Sangam		Urdu film; Pakistani first color film	
1965	Ek Aler Roop Khatha			
	Aur Ghum Nahi			
	Gayer Bodhu			
	Kanch Kata Heera			
	Kolomi Lota			
1966	Poonam ki Raat		Urdu film	
1967	Iss Dharti Per		Urdu film	
1967	Poonam ki Raat		Urdu film	
1967	Uljhan		Urdu film	
1968	Eto Tuku Asha			
1968	Meri Dosti Mera Pyar		Urdu film	
1968	Soeey Nadya Jage Pani		Urdu film	
1969	Neel Akasher Neechey			
1969	Pratikar			
1969	Qasam Uss Waqt Ki		Urdu film	
1970	Jibon Theke Neya	Sathi		
1970	Jey Aguney Puri			
1972	Ora Egaro Jon			
1973	Titash Ekti Nadir Naam	Basanti	Indo-Bangladesh joint production	
1974	Alor Michhil	Meena		
1975	Lathial	Kader's wife	Won- Bangladesh National Film Award for Best Supporting Actress	
1976	Surjo Grahan	Shirin		
1977	Rupali Saikate			
1978	Ashikkhito			
1978	Golapi Ekhon Traine	Golapi's Mother		
1978	Nagardola			
1979	Surjo Sangram	Shirin		
1979	Bela Shesher Gaan			
1986	Asha Nirasha			
1986	Khoma			
1995	Ei Ghor Ei Songsar			
2003	Bir Soinik	Mohammad Ali's mother		
2005	Porom Priyo			

== Awards ==
- National Film Award - 1975 for Best Supporting Actress
- Bachsas Awards
- Zahir Raihan Padak
- Nigar Awards vd

== Death and legacy ==
Afsari died on 9 March 2007 at Birdem Hospital, Dhaka of kidney failure. A Google Doodle on 23 April 2019 commemorated Afsari's 73rd birth anniversary.
