= Kancher Deyal =

- VCD cover of Kancher Deyal
- Bengali: কাঁচের দেয়াল
- Directed by: Zahir Raihan
- Written by: Zahir Raihan
- Screenplay by: Zahir Raihan
- Story by: Zahir Raihan
- Based on: Kancher Deyal (novel)
- Produced by: Zahir Raihan
- Starring: Anwar Hossain; Sumita Devi; Khan Ataur Rahman; Rani Sarkar; Inam Ahmed; Shawkat Akbar
- Cinematography: Afzal Chowdhury
- Edited by: Enamul Haque
- Music by: Khan Ataur Rahman
- Production company: Little Cine Circle
- Release date: 18 January 1963
- Country: Bangladesh
- Language: Bengali

Kancher Deyal (Bengali: কাঁচের দেয়াল; transl. Glass Wall) is a 1963 Bengali-language Bangladesh film. It was written and directed by Zahir Raihan. Anwar Hossain, Sumita Devi, Khan Ataur Rahman in the lead role and others supporting role were portrayed in the film.

== Plot ==
A helpless young woman is raised in her maternal uncle's family. After the death of her mother, her father becomes a vagabond. The girl suddenly wins much money in the lottery. She then struggles against her confining role in society.

== Cast ==
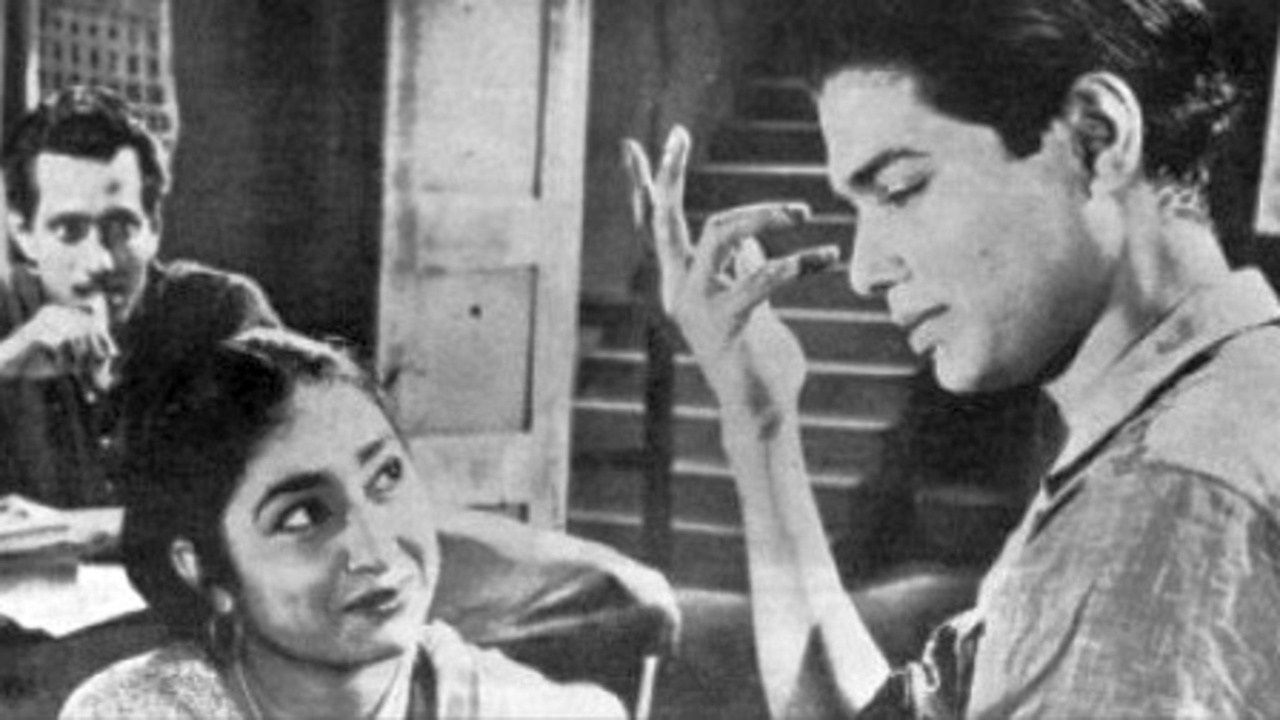
Anwar Hossain, Sumita Devi and Khan Ataur Rahman in a scene.

- Anwar Hossain
- Sumita Devi
- Khan Ataur Rahman
- Rani Sarkar
- Inam Ahmed
- Shawkat Akbar
- Abul Khayer
- Roji Samad
- Narayan Chakraborty
- Achia
- B.A. Malek
- Purnima Sen
- Abdul Matin

== Music ==
The film music directed by Khan Ataur Rahman. "Shamol Boron Meyeti" is a popular song in the film.

== Response ==
Film critic Ahmed Muztaba Zamal, when asked by Cinemaya in 2000 to select the top ten films from Bangladesh, named Kancher Deyal, made when the country was still East Pakistan, as one of the top twelve.

== Awards ==
- In 1965, the film won best film award in Pakistan Film Festival.
- Zahir Raihan received several awards including Best Director's Award.
