= Shuchanda =

Bangladeshi actress (born 1947)

- সুচন্দা
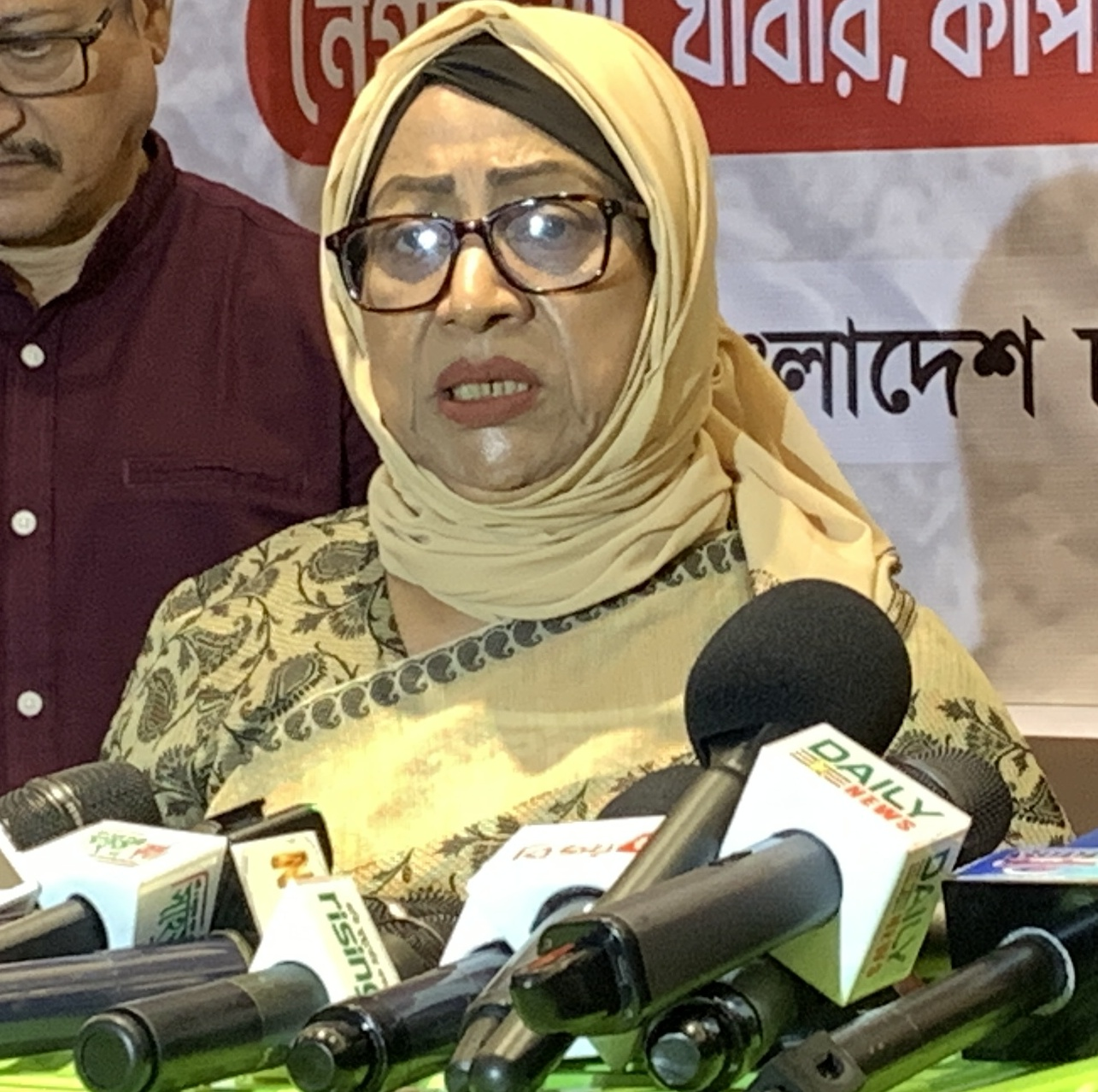
- Suchanda is speaking on a relief collection program for flood victims in Dhaka (2024)
- Born: Kohinoor Akhter; 19 September 1947 (age 78); Jashore, East Bengal, Dominion of Pakistan
- Years active: 1965-present
- Spouse: Zahir Raihan (m. 1967; disappeared 1972)
- Parents: Nizamuddin Atayub (father); Jahanara Begum (mother)
- Relatives: Bobita (sister); Champa (sister); Riaz (cousin)

Kohinoor Akhter (known by her stage name Shuchanda) is a Bangladeshi film actress and director. She started her career in the mid 1960s and acted in about 100 movies. She won Bangladesh National Film Award for Best Director for the film Hajar Bachhor Dhore (2005) and Bangladesh National Film Award for Lifetime Achievement (2019).

== Background ==
Kohinoor Akhter was born in Jashore in the then East Bengal, Dominion of Pakistan to Nizamuddin Atayub, a government employee, and Jahanara Begum, a homeopathy doctor. Her grandfather, Abdul Majid Biswas, was originated from Kashimpur Union in Jashore. Her two younger sisters, Farida Akhtar Babita and Gulshan Ara Akter Champa, went on to become actresses too. She has a brother, Iqbal Islam, a retired pilot.

Shuchanda studied in Momin Girls School (now Jashore Government Girls High School).

== Career ==
Shuchanda debuted in acting with the film Kagojer Nouka (1966), directed by Subhash Dutta. She acted in films like "Behula" (1966), "Shuorani Duorani" (1968) and "Jibon Theke Neya" (1970) — directed by her future husband Zahir Raihan.

As an actor, Shuchanda won a Nigar Award from Pakistan in 1987 for her role in the film Hum Ek Hain.

In 1985, Shuchanda debuted as a film producer and produced Teen Kanya, Taka Ana Pai and Protishodh, from her production house "Suchanda Cholochitra".

Shuchanda debuted as a director with the film Bidesh Jatra in 1998.

== Filmography ==
Year	Title	Role	Director	Notes	Ref(s)
1966	Behula				
1967	Anwara				
1967	Nayan Tara				
1968	Chawa Pawa		Narayan Ghosh Mita		
1968	Dui Bhai		Noorul Haq		
1968	Jahan Baje Shehnai		Rahman		
1968	Janglee Phool		M. Shahjehan		
1968	Koonch Baran Kanya		Zule Rahman		
1968	Nishi Holo Bhor		Nur-e-Alam		
1968	Parashmani		Zahir Choudhry		
1968	Rakhan Bandhu		Ibne Meezan		
1968	Sangsar	Jahan Ara	Fazal Haq		
1968	Shuryo Rani Duyo Rani		Matiul Haq		
1968	Zuleekha		Zahir Raihan		
1969	Moner Moto Bou		Nurul Haq		
1969	Natun Name Daku		Mumtaz		
1969	Piyasa		N. Islam		
1970	Jibon Theke Neya		Zahir Raihan		
1970	Je Agune Puri				
1972	Asru Diye Lekha				
1973	Dhire Bohe Meghna				
1974	Sangram				
1985	Teen Kanya				
1987	Behula Lakhshimdar				
1990	Jhinuk Mala				
1993	Basona				
1995	Prem Preeti				
1996	Sabuj Coat Kalo Chashma				
2005	Hajar Bachhor Dhore				
Unknown	Kacher Shwargo				

== Personal life ==
Shuchanda was married to Zahir Raihan until his disappearance in 1972, immediately after the liberation war of 1971. She has a daughter, Lisa Malik and a son, Arafat Raihan Opu. Lisa Malik is married to Abdullah M Zaber, Managing Director of Noman Group.

== Awards ==
- Standard Chartered-The Daily Star's "Celebrating Life Lifetime Achievement Award" (2017)
- Bangladesh National Film Award for Best Director (2005)
- Nigar Award for Best Actress (1987)
- Bangladesh National Film Award for Lifetime Achievement (2019)
- 5th BIFA Lifetime Achievement (2026).
