= List of Dhallywood films before 1960 =

This is a list of Dhallywood films before 1960.

== 1929 ==
Title	Director	Cast	Genre	Release date	Notes	Ref(s)
1929
Sukumari (lit. 'The Good Girl')	Ambuj Prasanna Gupta	Nawabzada Nasarullah, Syed Abdus Sobhan	Short	October 1929	The first silent short film of Eastern Bengal.	

== 1931 ==
Title	Director	Cast	Genre	Release date	Notes	Ref(s)
1931
The Last Kiss	Ambuj Prasanna Gupta	Salin Roy, Tuntun, Lalita, Khwaja Ajmal, Khwaja Mohammed Shahed, Nawabzada Nasarullah, Khwaja Mohammed Adel, Syed Saheb-e-Alam, Khwaja Mohammed Akmal, Charu Bala	Drama	1931	The first East Bengali silent film to be full-length.	

== 1956 ==
Films	Director	Cast	Genre	Released Date	Note	Ref.
Mukh O Mukhosh	Abdul Jabbar Khan	Inam Ahmed, Abdul Jabbar Khan, Aminul Haque, Purnima Sengupta, Atiya, Pari Begum, Johar Aara, Bilkis Bari, Rahima Khatun, Saifuddin	Drama	3 August 1956	The first full-length non-silent "talkie" film, and considered as the first properly developed feature film of the region. It took 3 years to complete the film, while none of the cast had any prior experience in films.	

== 1959 ==
Title	Director	Starring	Language	Ref.
Akash Ar Mati	Fateh Lohani	Sumita Devi, Probir Kumar, Kalapna, Sona Mian	Bengali	
Ei Desh Tomar Amar	Ehtesham	Rahman, Sumita Devi, Shabnam, M. Din, A. Rahman	Bengali	
Matir Pahar	Mohiuddin	Sultana Zaman, Kafi Khan, Rawshan Ara	Bengali	
Jago Hua Severa	A. J. Kardar	Tripti Mitra, Khan Ataur Rahman (as Anis), Zoreen, Rakshi	Urdu	

== See also ==
- List of highest grossing Bangladeshi films
- List of Bangladeshi film series
- Independent films of Bangladesh
- Bangladesh National Film Award for Best Film
- List of Bangladeshi submissions for the Academy Award for Best Foreign Language Film

== Sources ==
- Gazdar, Mushtaq (1997). Pakistan Cinema, 1947-1997. Oxford University Press. ISBN 0-19-577817-0.
- Kabir, Alamgir (1979). Film in Bangladesh. Bangla Academy. OCLC 475556557.
