= List of Dhallywood films of 1961 =

The Dhallywood film industry released five feature films in 1961.

| Title | Director | Starring | Language | Ref. |
|---|---|---|---|---|
| Harano Din | Mustafiz | Rahman, Shabnam, Golam Mustafa, Azim, Subhash Dutta, Misbah | Bengali | |
| Je Nadi Marupathey | Salahuddin | Rowshan Ara, Sanjib, Ataur Rahman | Bengali | |
| Kokhono Asheni | Zahir Raihan | Sumita Devi, Shabnam, Anis, Misbahuddin | Bengali | |
| Rajdhanir Buke | Ehtesham | Rahman, Chitra, Shabnam, Azim, Golam Mustafa, Subhash Dutta | Bengali | |
| Tomar Amar | Mohiuddin | Chitra, Amin, Anwar Hossain | Bengali | (Note: Gazdar gives the name of Mohiuddin's 1961 film as Yuumaar Amaar, but Kabir writes Tomar Amar, which corresponds with Shikdar.) |

== See also ==
- 1961 in Pakistan

== Notes ==
There are numerous minor inconsistencies in transliteration among the sources. Greater discrepancies are as follows:
