= Uzzal =

Bangladeshi actor, producer and director

Ashraf Uddin Ahmed Uzzal
- Born: Ashraf Uddin Ahmed Uzzal; 28 April 1946 (age 80); Pabna District, Bengal Presidency, British India
- Education: University of Dhaka
- Occupations: Actor, director
- Years active: 1968–present

Ashraf Uddin Ahmed Uzzal (known by the stage name Uzzal; 28 April 1946) is a Bangladeshi film actor, producer and director. He made his film debut in the Subhash Dutta directed film Binimoy. In addition to acting, he also produced and directed films. He acted in over 100 films and also in about 100 television plays. Notable films in which he starred include Arunodoyer Agnishakkhi and Nalish. His directorial works include Shakti Porikkha, Tibro Protibad, and Paaper Shasti.

== Early life ==
Uzzal was born in Jantihar village, Faridpur, Pabna District in the then British India. He was a student of the University of Dhaka. He passed his MA in international relations in 1970 from Dhaka University. While staying at the SM hall of Dhaka University in 1967–69, he played the role of a hero in university plays or in dramas staged by TSC, and Sujata or Rubina was his co-artist.

== Career ==
From 1967 to 1969, he used to act in dramas on Dhaka Television. In 1970, Uzzal debuted his acting career in Subhash Dutta's film Binimoy. He made his first film debut with actress Kabori. Then, in 1972, he played a role in the Yousuf Zahir directed comedy-dramatic film Ieye Korey Biye with Bulbul Ahmed and Bobita. In the same year, he played a role in the Subhash Dutta directed film Arunodoyer Agnishakkhi based on Bangladesh War of Liberation. Over the years, he acted with actresses like Kabori, Rozina, Bobita, Shabana, Shabnam, Sucharita, and Dolly Anwar. He suffered a leg injury during the shooting of the film Oporadh. He acted in films such as Janata Express, Kudraat and Phooler Shori after the accident.

Uzzal also directed the films Shakti Porikkha, Tibro Protibad, and Paaper Shasti.

Uzzal is involved in the Film Producers and Distributors Association and is a member of the Film Censor Board.

== Political career ==
He is very active in politics. He was senior vice president of Jatiyatabadi Samajik Sangskritik Sangstha (Jasas), cultural wing of Bangladesh Nationalist Party (BNP).

== Filmography ==
Year	Title	Role	Note
1970	Binimoy	Munir	First film
1970	Megher Pore Meg	Mohsin	
1972	Arunodoyer Agnishakkhi	Asad	The first film opposite Babita
1972	Kach er Sworgo		
1972	Lalon Fakir	Lalon	
1972	Samadan	Shelim	
1972	Shikriti		
1973	Ieye Korey Biye	Tenu	
1973	Duti Mon Duti Asha		
1973	Paye Cholar Path		
1973	Balaka Mon		
1974	Shonibarer Chithi		
1975	Donnhi Meye		
1976	Gormil		
1976	Samadi		
1977	Onuvob		
1977	Dom Maro Dom		
1977	Pinjor		
1977	Rupali Soykothe		
1978	Agnishika		
1978	Ochena Othiti		
1978	Dabi		
1978	Bondhu		
1978	Fakir Majnu Shah		
1978	Mohesh Khalir Bake		
1979	Onuragh		
1979	Bela Sesher Gaan		
1980	Ekhoni Somoy		
1981	Janata Express		
1982	Nalish		
1982	Lal Kajol		
	Kudrat		
	Nijere Haraye Khuji		
	Opobad		
	Banglar Mukh		
	Bedin		
	Dosti		
	Amir Fakir		Ujjal Produced
	Ushila		
	Nasir		Ujjal Produced
	Ghor-Songsar		
	Karon		
	Niyot		
	Bishal		
	Chor Dakat Police		
	Chitter Number One		
	Raj Shinghason		
1989	Birangona Shokona		
1990	Nalish	Gitin Gosh	
2009	Jaan Amar Jaan		
2009	Sobar Upore Tumi		
2011	Wanted		
2011	King Khan	Ashraf Iqbal	
2012	Don Number One		
2012	Durdorsho Premik		
2012	Buk Fatey To Mukh Foteyna		
2012	Raja Surjo Kha	Jang Bahadur Sher Khan	
2014	Kothin Protishodh		
2014	Hero: The Superstar		
2015	Rajababu - The Power		
2020	Shahenshah		

As director

- Shokti Porikkha (1994)
- Tibro Protibad
- Paper Shasti
