= List of Pakistani films of 1967 =

A list of films produced in Pakistan in 1967 (see 1967 in film) and in the Urdu language:

== 1967 ==
Title	Director	Cast	Notes
1967
Aag	S. Suleman	Zeba, Mohammad Ali, Lehri, Tarranum, Talish	Music by Nisar Bazmi
Aaliya		Shamim Ara, Kamal, M. Ismail, Rangeela	
Albela		Kamal, Ghazala, Zeenat, Asliya	
Bahadur		Musarrat Nazir, Darpan, Mohammad Ali, Lehri	
Bereham		Rani, Santosh, Seema, Talish, Zulfi	
Burma Road		Sabira Sultana, Habib, Sawan, Nazar, Shelley	
Chakori	Ehtesham	Nadeem, Shabana, Dear Asghar, Mirza Shahi	East Pakistan; music by Robin Ghosh
Chattan		Neelo, Sudhir, Aslam Pervaiz, Rangeela	
Chote Saheb	Mustafiz	Nadeem, Shabana, Dear Asghar, Sujata	East Pakistan
Darshan	Rehman	Shabnam, Rahman, Garaj Babu, Reshma	East Pakistan; music by Bashir Ahmad
Devar Bhabi	Hassan Tariq	Santosh Kumar, Rani, Waheed Murad, Sabiha, Lehri	
Dil Deewana		Kamal, Deeba, Zeenat, Mehtab	
Doraha	Pervez Malik	Deeba, Waheed Murad, Shamim Ara, Nirala	Music by Sohail Rana
Dost Dushman		Deeba, Ejaz, Talish, Saqi	
Ehsaan	Pervez Malik	Waheed Murad, Zeba, Nirala, Rozina	Music by Sohail Rana
Eilaan		Saloni, Allaudin, Sabira Sultana, Adeeb	
Fantoosh		Rozina, Nihal, Maqsood, Rashid	
Gunah Gaar		Husna, Ejaz Durrani, Saloni, Allauddin	
Hamdam	N. Haq	Rehana Siddiqui, Khalil, Akbar, Rukhsana	East Pakistan
Hamraaz	Khurshid Anwar		
Hatim Tai		Saloni, Mohammad Ali, Rukhsana, Yousuf	
Hokomat		Rani, Sudhir, Ilyas Kashmiri, Talat Siddiqui	
Insaniyat	Shabab Keranvi	Zeba, Waheed Murad, Tariq Aziz, Firdaus	
Iss Dharti Per	Noorul Alam	Rosy, Haroon, Farida, Mirza, Khalil	East Pakistan
Jan Pehchan		Shahpara, Mohammed Ali, Tarana, Shakir	
Kafir		Rani, Sudhir, Talish, Aslam Pervaiz	
Lahu Pukare Ga		Firdaus, Santosh, Aslam Pervaiz, K. Irani, Talish	
Lakhon Mein Aik	Raza Mir	Shamim Ara, Ejaz Durrani, Saqi, Mustafa Qureshi, Talish	Music by Nisar Bazmi
Maa Baap		Zeba, Waheed Murad, Talat Siddiqui, Allaudin	
Main Bhi Insan Hon	Nasir Khan	Attiya, Sujata, Mehmood, Shams Irani	East Pakistan
Main Woh Nahin		Rukhsana, Kamal, Lehri, Diljit	
Mere Bache Meri Ankhen		Deeba, Syed Kamal, Talat Siddiqi, Rashid	
Nadira		Rani, Habib, Ejaz, Adeeb	
Phir Subah Ho Gi		Deeba, Waheed Murad, Talat Siddiqi, Deeba, I. Yusuf	
Poonam ki Raat	Khaleel	Rosy, Akbar, Khalil, Sadhana	East Pakistan
Rishta Hai Pyar Ka	Qamar Zaidi	Zeba, Waheed Murad, Farida, Kamal Irani	
Sajda		Deeba, Mohammed Ali, Zeenat, Saqi, Kumar	
Shab-ba-Khair		Kamal, Rani, Komal, Ejaz, Adeeb	
Sham Sawera		Neelo, Darpan, Sabira Sultana, Talish	
Shola Aur Shabnam		Rukhsana, Sudhir, Darpan, Shamim Ara, Rukhsana	
Sitangar		Sabiha, Darpan, Rani, Rukhsana, Yusuf	
Suhagan		Zeba, Syed Kamal, Iqbal Yusuf, Aslam Pervaiz	
Ulfat		Deeba, Habib, Saqi, Akhtar Abbas	
Uljhan	A. Hussain	Rosy, Khalil, Nasima Khan, Hasan Imam	East Pakistan
Ustadon ke Ustad		Rozina, Fazlani, Samira, Nirala	
Waqt ki Pukar		Zeba, Tahir, Kamal Irani, Ada	
Yatim		Rani, Ejaz, Allaudin	
Zinda Laash	Khwaja Sarfraz	Deeba, Nasreen, Habib, Rehan, Talish	

== See also ==
- 1967 in Pakistan
