= Samadhi (disambiguation) =

Samadhi is an Indian religious term, commonly translated as meditation or contemplation.

Samadhi may also refer to:

- Samadhi (shrine), a Hindi term for a mausoleum, tomb, or monument for a deceased saint or guru
- Mahasamādhi, act of leaving the body in the state of Samādhi
- Bhava samadhi
- Savikalpa samādhi
- Sānanda samādhi
- Samadhi Statue, Anuradhapura
- 12472 Samadhi, an asteroid discovered in 1997

== Names ==
- Samadi (surname)

== Film, books and music ==
- Samadhi (actress) (born 1994), Mexican actress and performer
- Samadhi (1950 film), 1950 Bollywood film
- Samadhi (1972 film), 1972 Bollywood film
- samādhi Sheol, a character in the books The Chronicles of Thomas Covenant
- Secret Samadhi, a 1997 album by Live
- Samadhi Sound, an independent record label of David Sylvian
