= Chanda (1962 film) =

1962 film

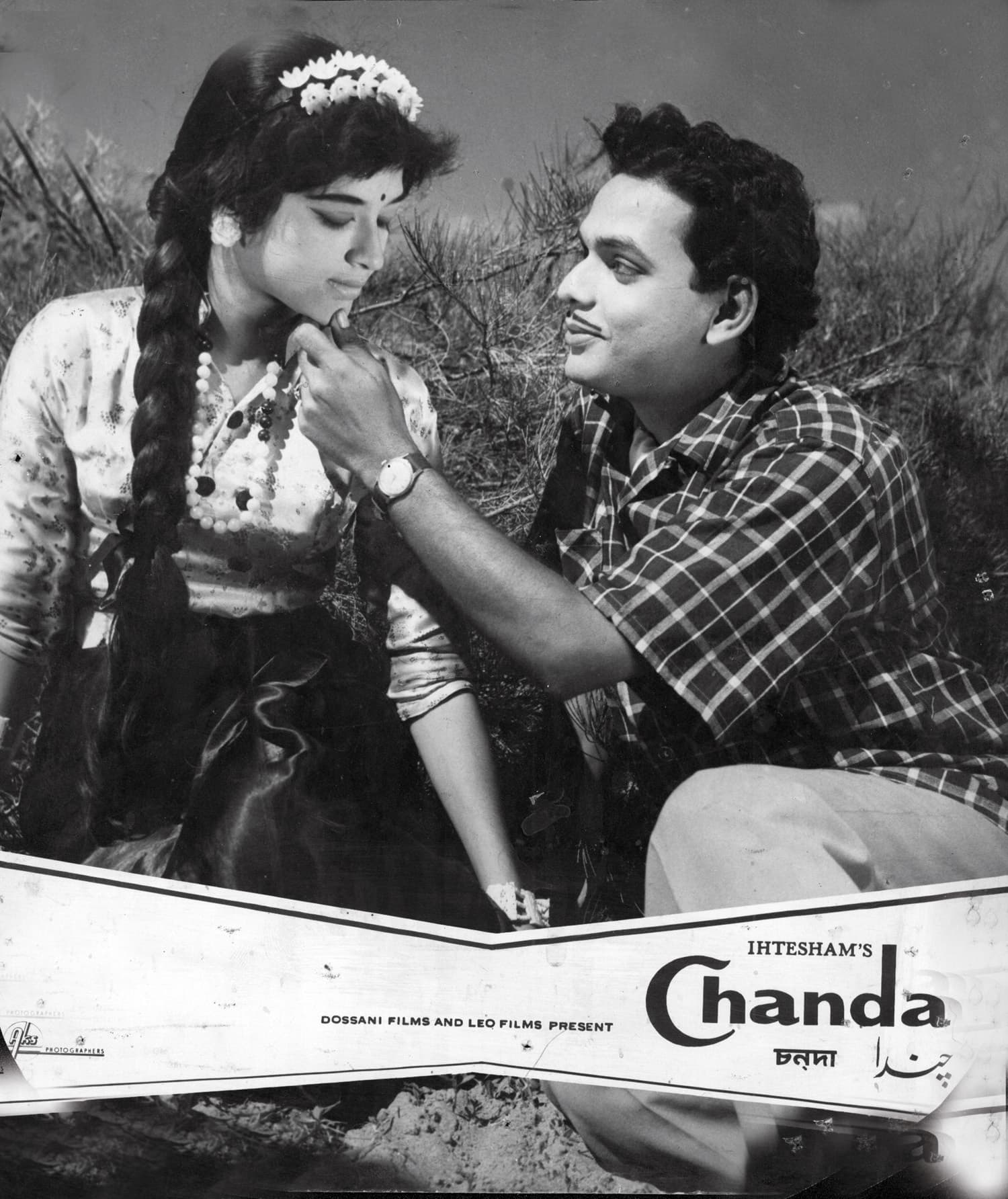
- Poster
- چندا
- Directed by: Ehtesham
- Written by: Story & Screenplay: Ehtesham; Dialogue: Suroor Barabankvi
- Produced by: FA Dosani
- Starring: Rehman; Sultana Zaman; Shabnam; Golam Mustafa; Subhash Dutta
- Cinematography: MQ Zaman
- Music by: Robin Ghosh
- Production company: East Pakistan Film Development Corporation
- Distributed by: Dosani Films; Leo Films; Eveready Pictures
- Release date: 3 August 1962
- Country: Pakistan
- Language: Urdu

Chanda is an Urdu-language film that was released on 3 August 1962 in Pakistan. It stars Rehman and Sultana Zaman in lead roles. It is the first Urdu-language film to be produced in East Pakistan (present-day Bangladesh).

It was also Shabnam's Urdu film debut.

== Cast ==
- Rehman
- Sultana Zaman
- Shabnam
- Golam Mustafa
- Subhash Dutta
- Rani Sarker

== Music ==
Chanda

Soundtrack album by Ferdausi Rahman, Anjuman Ara Begum, Farida Yasmin, Najmul Huda, Akhtar Abbas
- Released: 1962
- Genre: Folk music
- Language: Urdu
- Producer: Robin Ghosh

Chanda Soundtrack – Track listing
No.	Title	Lyrics	Singers	Length
1.	"Akhian Tori Rah Niharen, O Pardesia, Aa Ja."	Suroor Barabankvi	Ferdausi Rahman
2.	"Chandni, Bheegi Bheegi Hawa, Na Janay, Dil Kahan Kho Geya."	Suroor Barabankvi	Anjuman Ara Begum
3.	"Chhalkay Gagria, Bheegay Chunaria, Aisay Na Dekho, Sanwaria."	Suroor Barabankvi	Ferdausi Rahman, Farida Yasmin
4.	"Lut Geya Khushion Ka Dera, Kho Geya, Hey Pyar Mera.."	Suroor Barabankvi	Ferdausi Rahman
5.	"Mout Ki Hay Pukar, Deep Bujha Do.."	Suroor Barabankvi	Ferdausi Rahman, Najmul Huda
6.	"Naino Say Ghoonghat Koi Laye, Nazar Sharmaye.."	Suroor Barabankvi
7.	"Rang Roop, Jawani, Rut Sawan Ki Suhani."	Suroor Barabankvi	Ferdausi Rahman, Farida Yasmin
8.	"Sanbhal Kay O Albeli, Kahan Chali Hay Akeli.."	Suroor Barabankvi	Akhtar Abbas, Anjuman Ara Begum
9.	"Sayyan, Bedardi Mora, Dard Na Janay Ray.."	Suroor Barabankvi	Farida Yasmin

== Release ==
Chanda was released on 3 August 1962, six years of the release of Mukh O Mukhosh, the first feature film of East Pakistan. J.C. Anand distributed the film in Punjab and North-West Frontier Province through his distribution company Eveready Pictures. Anis Dosani arranged to distribute the film in other provinces and territories of Pakistan on a commission basis. Chanda was shown in movie theatres for 25 weeks.

== Reception ==
Chanda was a commercial success in Pakistan and became a hit. According to Anupam Hayat, the film ushered in a new era in Pakistan. It changed the fate of Dhallywood positively. Film director Azizur Rahman criticized the poster of the film. He said the film's main theme is not presented in the poster.

Bengali filmmaker Alamgir Kabir said about Chanda in 1969:

The industry was fast heading for a disaster when a director dared to go a little bit further and made an Urdu language film. The film was Chanda (1962) directed by Etesham. It proved a money-spinner in both East and West Pakistan. Chanda's performance naturally encouraged a trend of Urdu filmmaking in East Pakistan.

== Accolades ==
Award Title	Category	Awardee	Result	Ref
6th Nigar Awards	Best film	Ehtesham	Won	
6th Nigar Awards	Best supporting actress	Shabnam	Won	
6th Nigar Awards	Best comedian	Subhash Dutta	Won	
