= Bedin =

Bedin is a surname. Notable people with the surname include:

- Camille Bedin (1893–1979), French politician
- Gianfranco Bedin (born 1945), Italian footballer
- Luigi Rolly Bedin (born 1973), italian researcher and astrophysicist
- Martine Bedin, French architect and designer
- Maurizio Bedin (born 1979), Italian footballer

Bedin may also refer to the galaxy Bedin I, a dwarf spheroidal galaxy.
