= Mahbuba Rahman =

Bangladeshi singer (1935–2026)

- মাহবুবা রহমান
- Born: 3 March 1935
- Died: 26 March 2026 (aged 91)
- Occupation: Singer
- Spouse: Khan Ataur Rahman
- Children: Rumana Islam

Mahbuba Rahman (née Hasnat; 3 March 1935 – 26 March 2026) was a Bangladeshi singer. She worked in the film industry during 1950s and 1960s. Rahman was the playback singer of Mukh O Mukhosh (1956), the first Bengali language feature film produced in erstwhile East Pakistan (now Bangladesh). She was awarded Ekushey Padak in 1998 by the Government of Bangladesh for her contribution to music.

== Early life and career ==
Rahman was born on 3 March 1935. She started singing at the age of eight. Rahman was mentored by Shambhu Pal. In 1946, she recorded her first song at All India Radio by the music composition of Samar Das.

She released a music album, Mahbuba Rahman er Kaaljoyee Gaan, in 2015.

== Personal life and death ==
Rahman was married to actor-filmmaker Khan Ataur Rahman. Musician Rumana Islam is their daughter. Rahman died on 26 March 2026, at the age of 91.

== Awards ==
- Ekushey Padak (1998)
- Golden Jubilee Film Audience award (2006) for the 50s Best Singer

== Filmography ==
List of playback songs recorded by Rahman:

- Mukh O Mukhosh (1956)
- Amar Golar Haar in Asiya (1960)
- Agun Jalaish Na Amar Gaye in Saat Bhai Champa (1968)
- Moner Bon-e Dola Lagey in the film Shurjo Snan
- Jago Hua Savera
- Kokhono Asheni
- E Desh Tomar Amar
- Sonar Kajol
- Je Nodi Morupothe
- Raja Sannasi
- Nabab Sirajuddowlah
