= Hedgehog (galaxy) =

Isolated dwarf galaxy

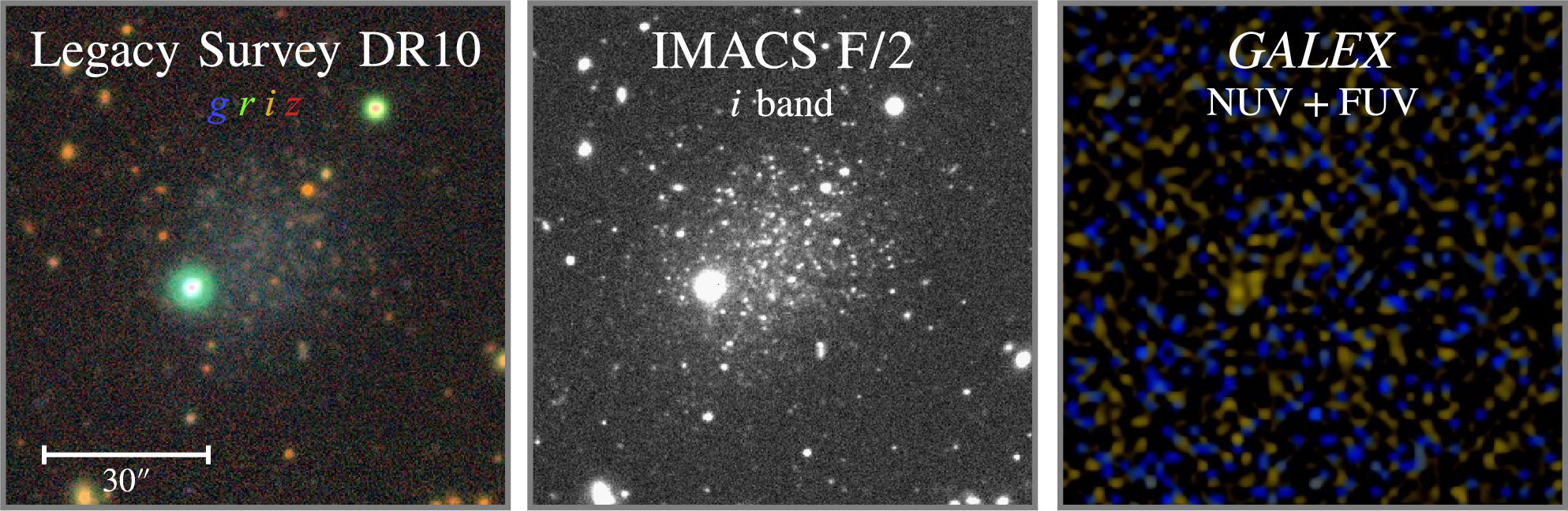
- The Hedgehog Galaxy (under different wavelengths)

Observation data (J2000 epoch)
- Constellation: Virgo
- Right ascension: 13^{h} 22^{m} 46.88^{s}
- Declination: −20° 53′ 55.94″
- Distance: 7.88
- Apparent magnitude (V): 17.35 (g)

Characteristics
- Type: dwarf galaxy
- Apparent size (V): 0.5 x 0.5 arcmin
- Half-light radius (physical): 176±14 pc

Other designations
- LGC2024 dw1322m2053

Hedgehog is an isolated low surface brightness dwarf galaxy in the constellation Virgo. With no neighboring galaxies within 1 Mpc and located 1.7Mpc from the nearest massive galaxy group, Hedgehog is one of the most isolated quiescent dwarfs found to date. It was discovered in 2024.

Hedgehog is less massive than the other extremely isolated dwarfs KKs3 and KKR25. It shows no sign of recent star formation and has an old stellar population.

Hedgehog is most likely to originate from the Cen A group, given their proximity. However, its distance to Cen A might be too far compared with simulations. Given its current distance of 1.7 Mpc from Cen A, Hedgehog’s travel time, assuming an ejection velocity of v ≈260±60kms−1 (Müller et al. 2022), would be 4–6 Gyr. If Hedgehog was quenched within 1–2 Gyr after it had the pericenter passage in the Cen A group, the estimated travel time agrees quite well with the inferred age of Hedgehog’s stellar population (≈ 5–7 Gyr). However, the inferred age of Hedgehog is still uncertain due to the age metallicity degeneracy. If a major merger of Cen A occurred around 2 Gyr ago, it would complicate this timing argument.

Hedgehog’s mass is close to the upper limit, where reionization can effectively quench star formation. Recent simulations demonstrate that field dwarfs with 10^{5−6} solar masses can be quenched by reionization but can also be rejuvenated later. To remain quiescent, it is possible that Hedgehog has a slightly lower halo mass, as indicated by its small half light radius, or experienced a stronger UV background due to the inhomogeneous nature of reionization.
