= Rajdhanir Buke =

Rajdhanir Buke রাজধানীর বুকে
- Poster
- Directed by: Ehtesham
- Screenplay by: Ehtesham
- Starring: Abdur Rahman; Shabnam; Chitra Sinha; Subhash Dutt; Nargis; Golam Mustafa; Azim
- Edited by: Bashir Hossain
- Music by: Robin Ghosh; Ferdousi Rahman
- Release date: 1960 or 1961
- Country: Pakistan
- Language: Bengali

Rajdhanir Buke is a Bengali-language East Pakistani drama film, directed by Ehtesham, starring Rahman, Shabnam, Chitra Sinha, Subhash Dutt, Nargis, Golam Mustafa, and Azim. The film was the acting debut for Shabnam, Subhash Dutt and Golam Mustafa .

== Cast ==
- Abdur Rahman - Hashem
- Shabnam
- Chitra Sinha
- Subhash Dutta - Karamat Ali
- Nargis
- Golam Mustafa - Landlord
- Azim

== Music ==
The film's music was directed by Robin Ghosh and Ferdousi Rahman. Song lyric by KG Mostafa. Talat Mahmud sang most of the songs. The song "Tomare Legechhe Eto Je Bhalo" gained the most popularity.

=== Track list ===
No.	Title	Writer(s)	Artist(s)	Length
1.	"Tomare Legechhe Eto Je Bhalo"	KG Mostafa	Talat Mahmud	3:34
2.	"Amar Se Gan Hariye Gechhe"	KG Mostafa	Talat Mahmud	3:27
