= Arunodoyer Agnishakkhi =

Bangladeshi film

- Cover VCD
- Bengali: অরুণোদয়ের অগ্নিসাক্ষী
- Directed by: Subhash Dutta
- Produced by: Ramla Saha
- Starring: Uzzal; Bobita; Anwar Hossain; Subhash Dutta
- Music by: Satto Saha
- Distributed by: Jamuna Kathochittor
- Release date: 1972
- Country: Bangladesh
- Language: Bengali

Arunodoyer Agnishakkhi (Bengali: অরুণোদয়ের অগ্নিসাক্ষী) is a 1972 Bangladeshi film based on the Liberation war of Bangladesh directed by Subhash Dutta. Babita, Ujjal and Anwar Hossain played the three lead roles.

== Plot ==
During the war of independence of Bangladesh, a number of women were victimized by Pakistani Military. A film actor takes the responsibility of the war heroines.

== Cast ==
- Bobita
- Anwar Hossain
- Subhash Dutta
- Uzzal
- Masud
- Khokan
- Ahmed Sharif
- Abul Hayat
