= Inam Ahmed =

Bangladeshi actor (1922 –2003)

- ইনাম আহমেদ
- Born: 1 February 1922; Sylhet, Bengal Presidency, British India
- Died: 13 September 2003 (aged 81); Sylhet, Bangladesh
- Occupation: Actor
- Years active: 1956 – 1997
- Known for: Mukh O Mukhosh
- Spouse: Razia Ahmed
- Children: Farooq Ahmed; Maruf Ahmed; Nazma Ahmed

Inam Ahmed (1 February 1922 – 13 September 2003) was a Bangladeshi film actor. He also acted in plays. He first appeared on onscreen in the West Bengali film Somadhan in 1943.

== Early life and education ==
Ahmed was born in 1922 to a Muslim family in Golapganj Upazila of Sylhet District in East Bengal. He began acting in plays at the age of 8. In 1941, he graduated from Calcutta University and then joined the Assam Civil police.

== Career ==
Ahmed took part in several plays on a regular basis when he was in Assam. After three years of service, he moved to Calcutta. While working in a non-governmental organization, he looked for an opportunity to do work in film. In 1943, he appeared in the film Somadha, directed by Premendra Mittea.

In 1950, Ahmed moved to Dhaka. There, he worked for several organizations.

In 1956, after releasing the film Mukh O Mukhosh, Ahmed became popular. It was the first Bengali-language feature film to be made in East Pakistan.

== Death ==
Ahmed died on September 13, 2003.

== Filmography ==
- Somadhan (1943)
- Mukh O Mukhosh (1956)
- Harano Din (1961)
- Sonar Kajol (1962)
- Chanda (1962)
- Joar Elo (1962)
- Natun Sur (1962)
- Kaser Deyal (1963)
- Sutorang (1964)
- Rupban (1965)
- Nacher Putul (1971)
- Chandranath (1984)
- Shuvoda (1986)
- Ekhono Onek Raat (1997)
