= Darshan (1967 film) =

1967 film

- Directed by: Rehman
- Starring: Rehman; Shabnam
- Music by: Bashir Ahmed
- Release date: 1967
- Country: Pakistan
- Language: Urdu

Darshan (transl. Vision) is a 1967 East Pakistani film directed by Rehman, who also played the lead role opposite Shabnam. Darshan was released on 8 September 1967 in East Pakistan and cinemas of Lahore, Pakistan.

== Plot summary ==
The film revolves around the romantic tale of a rich lady with a guesthouse owner.

== Film reception ==
In October 2015, the film was screened at Lok Virsa Museum in Pakistan. The film is known for its blockbuster music composed by Bashir Ahmed on his own written lyrics and he also sang them as a playback singer.

This film was a box office hit.

== Cast ==
- Shabnam
- Rehman
- Reshma
- Fateh Lohani

== Popular film songs ==
- Yeh samaa pyara pyara, yeh hawaein thandi thandi, Sung by Mala
- Youn akela mujhay chorr kar, Sung by Bashir Ahmad
- Hum chale chorr kar teri mehfil sanam, Sung by Bashir Ahmad
- Yeh mausam, yeh mast nazaray, pyar karo tau inn se karo, Sung by Bashir Ahmad
