= KKs 3 =

Galaxy in the constellation Hydrus

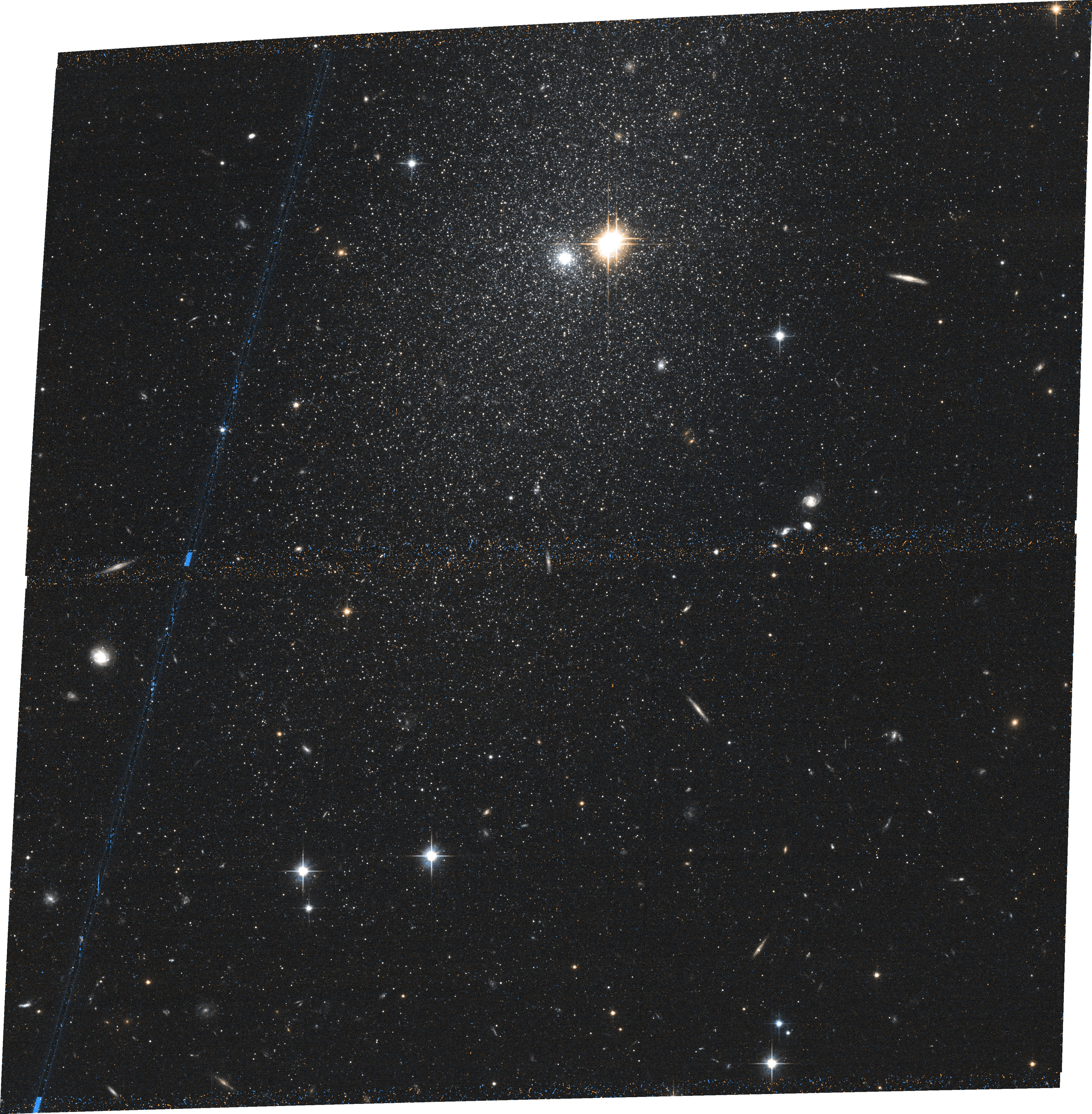
- Hubble Space Telescope image

Observation data (J2000 epoch)
- Constellation: Hydrus
- Right ascension: 02^{h} 24^{m} 44.4^{s}
- Declination: −73° 30′ 51″
- Heliocentric radial velocity: 316 ± 7 km/s
- Distance: 6.9 Mly (2.12 Mpc)
- Apparent magnitude (V): 14.47 ± 0.05
- Absolute magnitude (V): −12.3
- Absolute magnitude (B): −10.8
- Surface brightness: 24.87 mag/arcsec² (V, effective)

Characteristics
- Type: dSph
- Size: 4.9 kly (1.5 kpc)
- Half-light radius (apparent): 57.0″ (V)

Other designations
- LEDA 9140, PGC 9140, SGC 022423-7344.3, SGC 0224.3-7345, KKs 3

KKs 3 is a highly isolated dwarf spheroidal galaxy (dSph) in the constellation Hydrus, near the Local Group. It lies at a distance of about 2.12 megaparsecs (6.9 million light-years) from Earth. KKs 3 is quiescent, with no evidence of significant star formation during approximately the last billion years. Its combination of quiescence and extreme isolation is unusual, since gas-poor dwarf spheroidal galaxies are found predominantly near larger galaxies and galaxy groups. Most of its stellar mass formed more than 12 billion years ago, and an old, massive globular cluster lies close to its centre.

== Observation history ==
The object now known as KKs 3 was recorded in the Southern Galaxy Catalogue in 1985 and was later identified in all-sky surveys in 2000 and 2002 as a possible dwarf spheroidal galaxy near the Local Group. It was also catalogued as PGC 09140. The Updated Nearby Galaxy Catalog assigned it a distance of about 4 Mpc based on an assumed association with NGC 1313, which was subsequently shown to be incorrect.

KKs 3 was observed with the Advanced Camera for Surveys aboard the Hubble Space Telescope on 29 August 2014. The observations resolved the galaxy into individual stars and allowed its distance to be measured using the tip of the red-giant branch method, yielding 2.12 ± 0.07 Mpc. Its color–magnitude diagram showed a population dominated by old stars and no evidence of star formation within approximately the previous billion years, supporting its classification as a dwarf spheroidal galaxy.

Spectroscopy of the central globular cluster with the Southern African Large Telescope in January 2015 yielded a heliocentric radial velocity of 316 ± 7 km/s, corresponding to 112 km/s in the Local Group reference frame.

== Physical properties ==
KKs 3 has a stellar mass of about 2.3 × 10^{7}M_{☉}, a blue-band absolute magnitude of −10.8 and a visual-band absolute magnitude of −12.3. Its diameter is approximately 1.5 kpc (4,900 light-years).

Its surface-brightness profile is approximately exponential. In the V band, the exponential scale length is about 34 arcseconds, while the effective radius is about 57 arcseconds and the effective surface brightness is 24.87 mag arcsec^{−2}.

Neutral hydrogen has not been detected in KKs 3, although observations along its line of sight are complicated by emission from the Magellanic Stream. KKs 3 is forming very few, if any, new stars at present. Its specific star-formation rate is estimated to be more than two orders of magnitude lower than that of typical isolated dwarf galaxies.

== Stellar population and star-formation history ==
The stellar population of KKs 3 records three main periods of star formation. The dominant episode occurred about 12–14 billion years ago and produced approximately 74% of the galaxy's present stellar mass. The average metallicity of this oldest population is [Fe/H] ≈ −1.9.

Weaker periods of star formation occurred about 4–6 billion years ago and 0.8–2 billion years ago, contributing approximately 14% and 12% of the stellar mass, respectively. The stellar population became progressively more metal-rich, with the youngest stars reaching [Fe/H] ≈ −0.7.

The stellar populations also vary with distance from the centre. The redder, more metal-rich stars are more centrally concentrated, while the older and more metal-poor population has a flatter spatial distribution. This indicates gradients in both age and metallicity across the galaxy.

== Central globular cluster ==
KKs 3 contains a globular cluster close to its centre. Spectroscopic and photometric analysis gives it an estimated age of 12.6 ± 1.5 billion years and a metallicity of [Fe/H] = −1.55 ± 0.2. Its absolute visual magnitude is approximately −8.48 and its half-light radius is 4.8 ± 0.2 pc.

The cluster has stellar-population and structural properties similar to several old, massive, metal-poor globular clusters in the Milky Way. It contains roughly 4% of all KKs 3 stars with ages of 12–14 billion years and metallicities around [Fe/H] ≈ −1.5 to −1.6. Its age and metallicity place it within the earliest major period of star formation in KKs 3, and it has been interpreted as a surviving relic of that episode.

== Environment and isolation ==
KKs 3 is separated by large distances from other known galaxies. Its nearest known dwarf neighbours include IC 3104, about 0.99 Mpc away; ESO 294-010, about 1.21 Mpc away; IC 5152, about 1.23 Mpc away; and the Tucana Dwarf, about 1.34 Mpc away. Its nearest massive neighbour is the Andromeda Galaxy (M31), approximately 1.7 Mpc away.

The large separation from neighbouring galaxies makes strong gravitational disturbances during much of its recent history unlikely. KKs 3 belongs to a small population of quiescent dwarf galaxies found far from massive hosts. KKR 25 and Hedgehog have a comparable degree of isolation.

The origin of the quiescent state of isolated dwarfs such as KKs 3 remains uncertain. Cosmic web stripping has been proposed as one possible mechanism for isolated dwarf spheroidal galaxies. Other mechanisms considered for isolated quiescent dwarfs include previous passage through the halo of a more massive system followed by ejection into the field, reionization, and internal processes such as stellar and supernova feedback.
