= Chandni Raatey =

1993 Bangladeshi romantic drama film

- Poster
- Bengali: চাঁদনী রাতে
- Directed by: Ehtesham
- Written by: Ehtesham
- Screenplay by: Ehtesham
- Produced by: Aziz Mohammad Bhai
- Starring: Shabnur; Sabbir
- Cinematography: Sayed shahin
- Edited by: Atikur Rahman Mallik
- Music by: Manam Ahmed
- Production company: Ambee Films Ltd.
- Release date: 15 October 1993
- Running time: 147 minutes
- Country: Bangladesh
- Language: Bengali

Chandni Raatey (Bengali: চাঁদনী রাতে, lit. 'On a moonlit night') is a 1993 Dhallywood romantic drama film. The story and screenplay were written and directed by Ehtesham. The film stars debutants Shabnoor and Sabbir in the lead roles.

== History ==
Ehtesham was looking for new actors to act in the movie Chandni Raatey. Shabnoor debuted as a rookie at the age of 13 and Sabbir as a hero for the film. Most of the film was shot in Susong Durgapur in Netrakona. The film was shot for over a month. On 30 September 1993, the film received permission from the Bangladesh Film Censor Board; It was released in Bangladesh on October 15 of the same year. The film was a commercial failure.
