= Ei Desh Tomar Amar =

- Poster
- এ দেশ তোমার আমার
- Directed by: Ehtesham
- Screenplay by: Ehtesham
- Produced by: B A Khan
- Starring: Rahman; Sumita Devi; Azim; Subhash Dutta
- Music by: Khan Ataur Rahman
- Release date: 25 December 1959
- Country: Pakistan
- Language: Bengali

Ei Desh Tomar Amar (Bengali: এ দেশ তোমার আমার, lit. 'The Country Belongs To You and Me') is a 1959 Bengali-language Pakistani film starring Subhash Dutta and Sumita Devi opposite each other. Ehtesham debuted his directing in this film. It was released on Christmas Day 1959. It also stars Azim, Anis and Rahman.

Singer Farida Yasmin made her playback singing debut in this film with the song "Jani Na Furaye Jodi E Modhurati".
