= Chitra Sinha =

Bangladeshi film actress, dancer & producer

Chitra Sinha চিত্রা সিনহা
- Born: Rajshahi, Bengal, British India (present Rajshahi, Bangladesh)
- Other name: Chitra Zaheer
- Occupations: Actress, producer
- Years active: 1960–present
- Spouse: Kazi Zaheer

Chitra Sinha is a Bangladeshi film actress, dancer and also producer. In 1960, she made her acting debut with the film Rajdhanir Buke, directed by Ehtesham and with actor Rahman. During her acting career, she was in nine films. After marrying film director Kazi Zaheer, she took the name Chitra Zaheer.

== Early life ==
Chitra Sinha was born in Rajshahi.

== Filmography ==
=== As an actor ===
Year	Film	Director	Co-actor	Role	Language	Released date	Note
1960	Rajdhanir Buke	Ehtesham	Rahman		Bengali	2 September 1960	
1961	Tomar Amar	Mohiuddin	Aminul Haque		Bengali	10 December 1961	
1964	Shadi	Kaysar Pasha	Mofiz, Anowar Hossain		Urdu	14 February 1964	
1964	Ye Bhi Ek Kahani	SM Shafi	Harun Rashid,		Urdu	26 June 1964	
1964	Raja Elo Shohore	Mohiuddin	Anwar Hossain		Bengali	28 August 1964	
1964	Bandhon	Kazi Zaheer	Anwar Hossain, Gulam Mostofa		Urdu	6 November 1964	
1965	Godhulir Prem	Mohiuddin	Aminul Haque		Bengali	21 May 1965	
1966	Iss Dharti Par	Nurul Alom	Harun Rashid		Urdu	23 September 1966	
1966	Bhaiya	Kazi Zaheer	Wahid Murad, Shawkat Akbor, Anwar Hossain		Urdu	14 October 1966	

=== As a producer ===
Year	Film	Director	Cast	Released date	Note
1967	Nayon Tara	Kazi Zaheer	Azim, Suchanda, Ashish Kumar Laiho, Qazi Khalek, Reshma	27 October 1967	
1969	Mayna Moti	Kazi Zaheer	Razzak, Kobori, Anwar Hossain, Sirajul Islam, Jalil Afghani		
1972	Abujh Mon	Kazi Zaheer	Razzak, Shabana, Sujata, Shawkat Akbor, Narayon Chakroborti, Khan Joynul, Saifuddin		
1975	Chasir Meye	Babul Chowdhury	Shabana, Alamgir, Probir Mitro, Anowara, Telisamad	20 June 1975	
	Fuler Mala	Kazi Zaheer	Alomgir, Sandha Roy, Jafor Iqbal, Subarna Mustafa		
	Kotha Dilam				
1978	Badhu Biday	Kazi Zaheer	Bulbul Ahmed, Kobori, Shabana, Asish Kumar		
	Akash Pori				
1982	Ashar Alo	Nurul Haque Bachchu	Razzak, Shabana, Alamgir, Jafor Iqbal, Anjana Rahman	5 March 1982	
	Fuler Mala				
1983	Natun Bou	Abdul Latif Bachchu	Bobita, Subarna Mustafa, Raisul Islam Asad, Ariful Haque, Afzal Hossain	4 February 1983	
2010	Amar Shopno	Kazi Hayat	Purnima, ATM Shamsuzzaman, Maruf	19 March 2010	
