= Bedin I =

Dwarf spheroidal galaxy located in the constellation Pavo

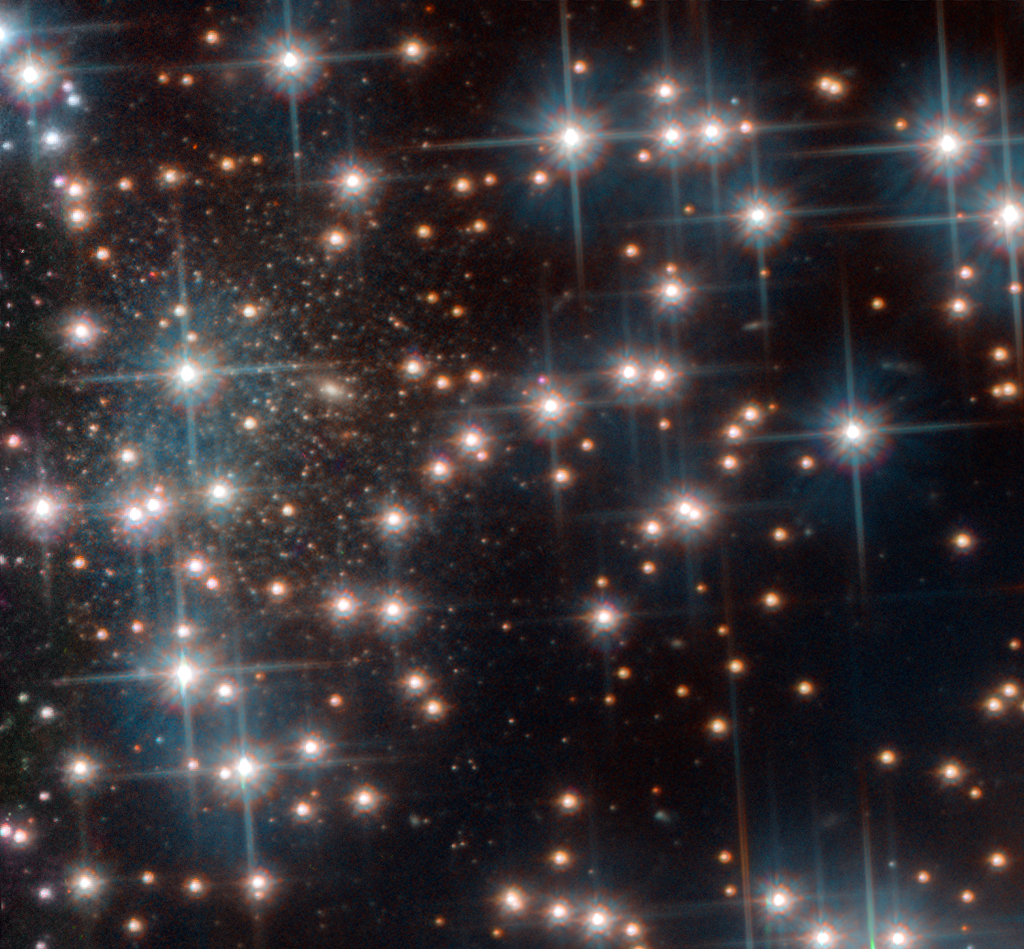
- Long-exposure photograph of Bedin I (left) (Note: This photograph was taken in a three-day exposure of the Wide Field Channel (WFC) of the Advanced Camera for Surveys (ACS) aboard Hubble between 9–13 September 2018. Bedin I is visible behind a group of stars at the far left of the image as a cluster of distant points of light; it is partly cut-off by the image's 1×1 arcminute field of view.)

Observation data (J2000 epoch)
- Constellation: Pavo
- Right ascension: 19^{h} 10^{m} 45.41^{s}
- Declination: −59° 55′ 04.32″
- Distance: 8.7+0.5 −0.7 Mpc
- Apparent magnitude (V): 19.94
- Absolute magnitude (V): −9.76

Characteristics
- Size: 840 × 340 pc
- Apparent size (V): 20" × 8"

Bedin I is a dwarf spheroidal galaxy located in the constellation Pavo. It is situated around 28.38 million light-years from Earth, behind the globular cluster NGC 6752. Bedin I is possibly one of the oldest galaxies known, having formed around 10–13 billion years ago, and is one of the most isolated dwarf galaxies known, situated around 2.12 million light-years away from NGC 6744, its nearest neighbor with which it may be physically associated. As such, it has been deemed by astronomers as a "fossil" from the early universe. It was accidentally discovered by Italian astronomer Luigi Bedin, whose team was studying white dwarfs in NGC 6752 using the Hubble Space Telescope in September 2018; the discovery was announced in a paper published in January 2019.

== Nomenclature ==
Bedin I, pronounced /bɛˈdiːn/, was named by its discovery team after their leader, Luigi Bedin, who is a researcher at the National Institute for Astrophysics's observatory in Padua, Italy. He was credited as the galaxy's sole discoverer. Bedin and the team opted to avoid the galaxy being given "an anonymous identification based on its coordinates."

== Characteristics ==
Bedin I is an isolated dwarf spheroidal galaxy located around 8.7 megaparsecs, or around 28.38 million light-years, from Earth, with similar characteristics to KKR 25 and the Tucana Dwarf Galaxy. It is estimated to be around 840 by 340 parsecs, or 2,700 by 1,100 light-years, in size, which is a fifth the size of the Large Magellanic Cloud. At a metallicity of −1.3, the galaxy's population is made up of metal-poor red giant stars, and its luminosity is roughly a thousand times dimmer than the Milky Way Galaxy, at an absolute magnitude of −9.76. Bedin I is believed to have formed around 10–13 billion years ago with no star formation having occurred since then, making it one of the oldest galaxies known. Bedin I is also possibly the most isolated dwarf galaxy known, located at least 650 kiloparsecs, or 2.12 million light-years, from its nearest neighbor, the intermediate spiral galaxy NGC 6744; (Note: Bedin I is ~650 kiloparsecs from NGC 6744 along the plane of the sky. More accurate measurements to judge its horizontal distance, and thus its true distance from NGC 6744, are needed.) the Milky Way and Andromeda galaxies are separated by a similar distance. A physical association with NGC 6744 has been speculated however, due to the close angular distance between the galaxies, and their similar physical distances from Earth. Its age, isolation, and lack of interaction with other galaxies has led to the galaxy being deemed a "fossil" from the early universe.

== Observation ==
External videos
- Zooming in on NGC 6752 and Bedin 1 (0:55) by European Space Agency

Bedin I is located in the constellation Pavo, at a right ascension of 19^{h} 10^{m} 45.41^{s} and declination of −59° 55′ 04.32″. The galaxy is situated behind a group of unnamed foreground stars within the globular cluster NGC 6752. Bedin I measures around 20 by 8 arcseconds across and has an apparent magnitude of 19.94, although its visibility is significantly decreased by NGC 6752, one of the brightest globular clusters in the sky with an apparent magnitude of 5.4. Bedin I was accidentally discovered by Luigi Bedin's team researching white dwarfs in the cluster in an effort to better determine the cluster's age. The galaxy partially appeared in the field of view during program GO-15096 of the Hubble Space Telescope, led by principal investigator Luigi R. Bedin, which occurred between 7 and 18 September 2018. The program, which saw the Wide Field Channel (WFC) of the Advanced Camera for Surveys (ACS) pointed at NGC 6752 for 75 exposures lasting 1,270 seconds each, was conducted over 40 orbits; these exposures were able to capture objects with an apparent magnitude above 30. Five of the orbits failed however, due to poor guide star acquisition. The journal Monthly Notices of the Royal Astronomical Society: Letters published the team's three-part scientific paper on findings from the program on 31 January 2019, with the first part dedicated to the discovery of Bedin I. A second program of 40 orbits, GO-15491, is currently scheduled for late 2019.

== See also ==
- List of galaxies named after people
- List of nearest galaxies
