= Luigi Rolly Bedin =

Italian researcher

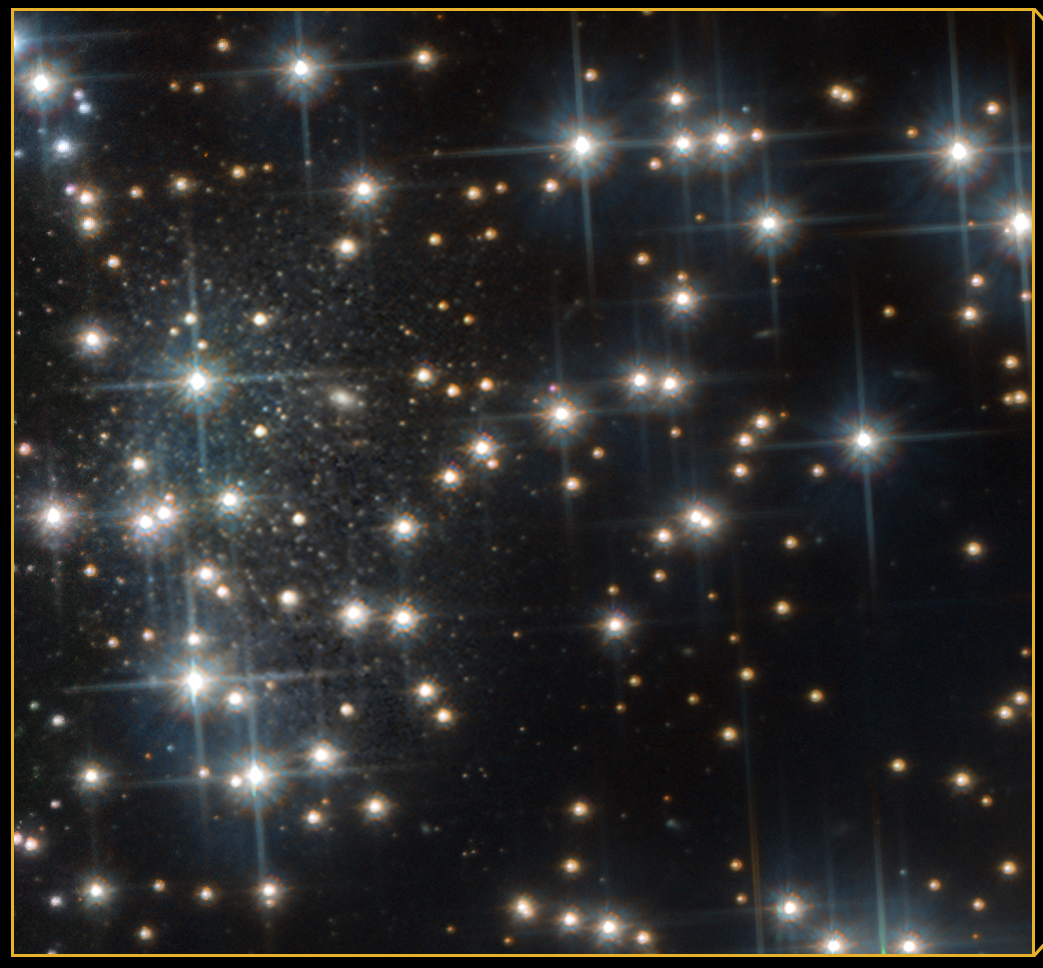
- Bedin I spheroidal dwarf galaxy hidden behind NGC 6752
- Education: University of California, Berkeley, Ph.D. in Astronomy and Astrophysics from the University of Padova
- Occupations: Stellar populations in open and globular clusters, exoplanets and nearby brown dwarfs

Luigi Rolly Bedin (born July 16, 1973, in Padua) is an Italian astrophysicist and researcher at the National Institute of Astrophysics of the Padua Astronomical Observatory. His research focuses on stellar populations in open and globular clusters, exoplanets and nearby brown dwarfs. He is the discoverer with his team of the dwarf spheroidal galaxy Bedin I. He is a member of the International Astronomical Union.

== Biography ==
=== Training ===
Luigi Rolly Bedin was born in 1973 in Padua. He obtained a master's degree in astronomy in 1999 at the University of Padua. He was awarded at the same University of Padova with a PhD in astronomy from a doctorate in 2003. His PhD thesis mainly carried out at the department of physics and astronomy of the University of California, Berkeley (UCB) under the direction of Professor Ivan R King.

Associate researcher in the astronomy department of UCB, between 2000 and 2002, he has since continued his scientific collaboration with researchers from several American institutes (UCB, UCLA, University of Washington, STScl.) on various topics concerning globular clusters.

In 2003, he was a fellow at the European Southern Observatory in Garching.

=== Professional career ===
From 2004 to 2007, Bedin was associate researcher at the European Southern Observatory in Garching.

From 2007 to July 15, 2011, he was an astronomer in the instrumental division of the Baltimore Space Telescope Science Institute. He shares his work between scientific activities and functional tasks for the institute and for the Hubble Space Telescope Observatory (calibration, user support, maintenance missions and support of the institute in general).

Since July 18, 2011, he has held a full-time scientific position at the National Institute of Astrophysics of the Astronomical Observatory of Padua.

Luigi R. Bedin, principal investigator of major HST programs is also leader of several observation projects for the world's main installations : HST, ESO/VLT, LBT and the James Webb Space Telescope (JWST).

== Research ==
His main scientific research concerns stellar populations in open and globular clusters, neighboring dwarf galaxies, the dynamics of globular clusters and cosmic distance scales. Since 2019 he has also worked on the search and characterization of exoplanets and nearby brown dwarfs, such as Luhman 16.

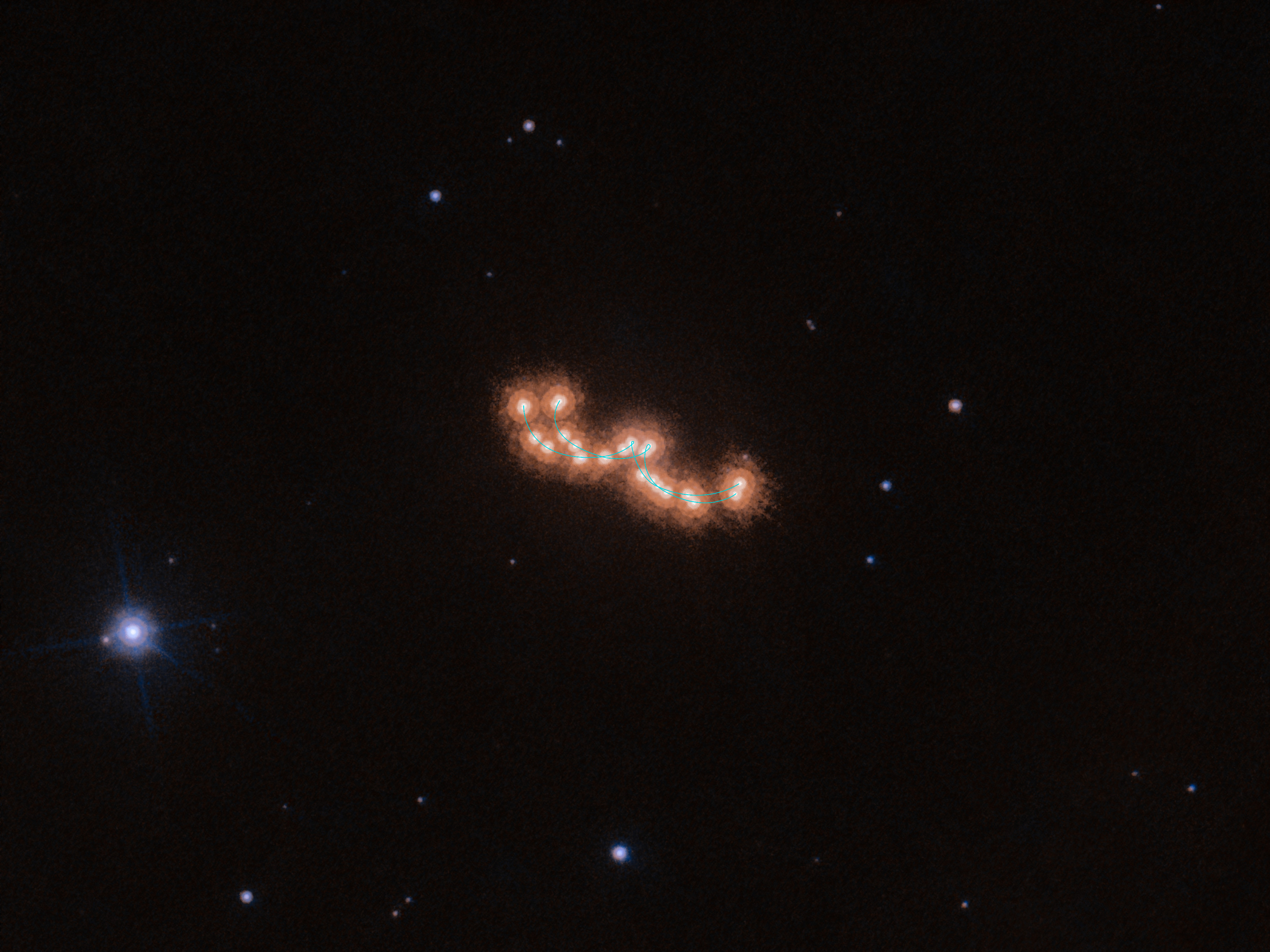
Waltz of the brown dwarfs Luhman16

He discovered, with his team, an isolated dwarf spheroidal galaxy as old as the universe hidden in NGC 6752. The discovery is published in international media in 2019. The galaxy bears his name : Bedin I.

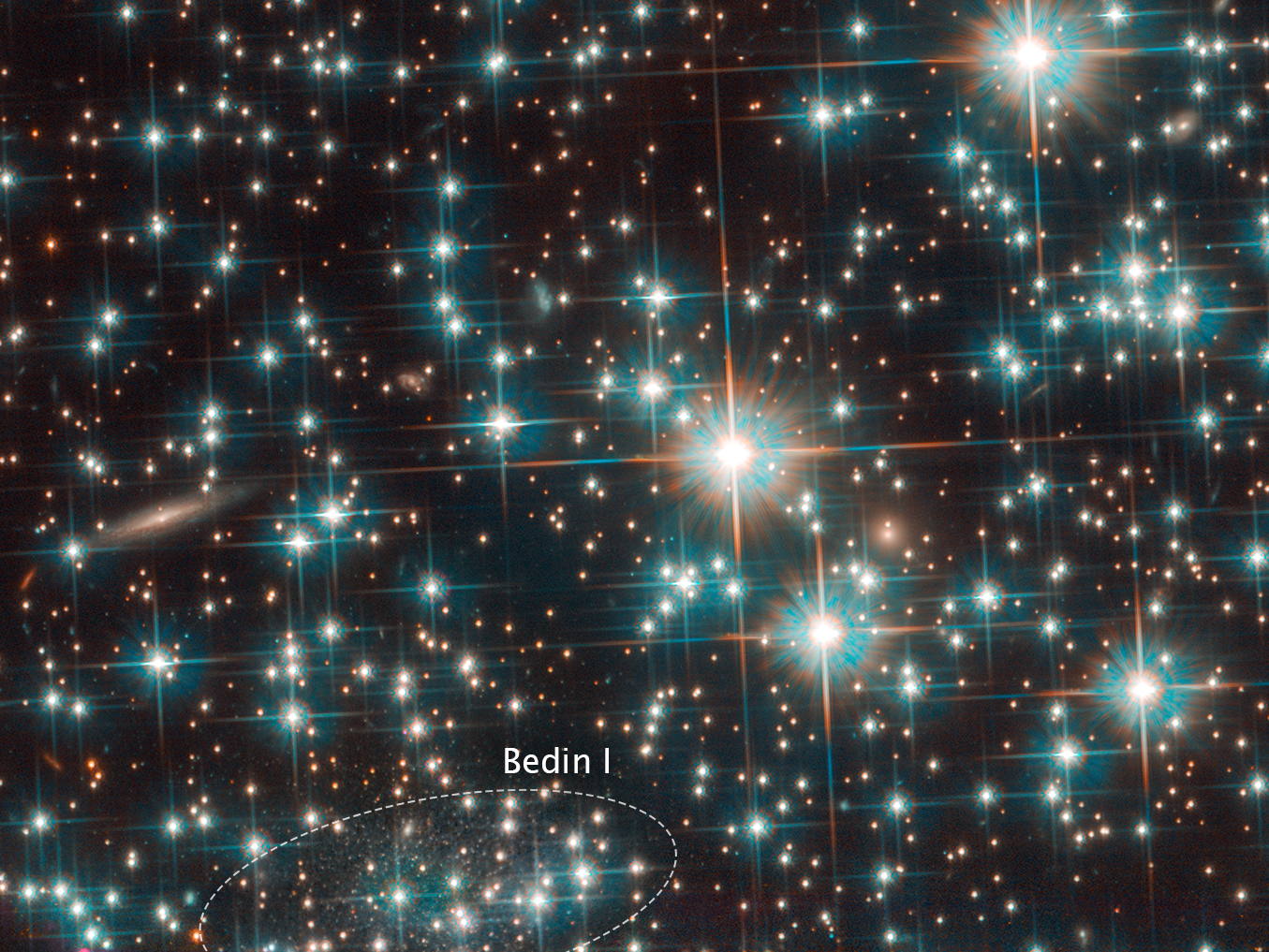
Bedin I Galaxy imaged by the Hubble Space Telescope

Luigi R. Bedin is an active member of divisions A, B, F, G of the International Astronomical Union:

- A : Fundamental astronomy
- B : Facilities, Technologies and Data Science
- F : Planetary systems and Bioastronomy
- G : Stars and stellar physics

Luigi Bedin astronomer defends the innovations of new telescopes and satellites such as Starlink to promote access to space.

He studies the rotation axis of comet 19P/Borrelly.

Research in astrometry and photometry from space with HST is enriched with JWST : calibration and instrumentation, extrasolar planets, clusters of globules.

He is co-author of a study on intermediate black holes with the discovery of a homogeneous dark mass of around 800 M _{☉} corresponding to an intermediate mass black hole at the center of the cluster closest to Earth, the globular cluster Messier 4.

In 2024, from JWST imaging of the nearest globular clusters, it detected excess infrared emission among white dwarfs in NGC 6397, a potential indication of destroyed ancient planetary systems and possible insights into the properties of the dense hydrogen atmosphere of these white dwarfs.

NGC6397 region double observation HST and JWST

== Tribute ==
2018 : The dwarf galaxy Bedin I discovered with his team.

== Publications ==
He has published in several specialized journals such as ApJ, AJ, MNRAS, Nature and A&A, more than 210 peer-reviewed research articles accepted by international reading committees.
