= NGC 6752 =

Globular cluster in the constellation Pavo

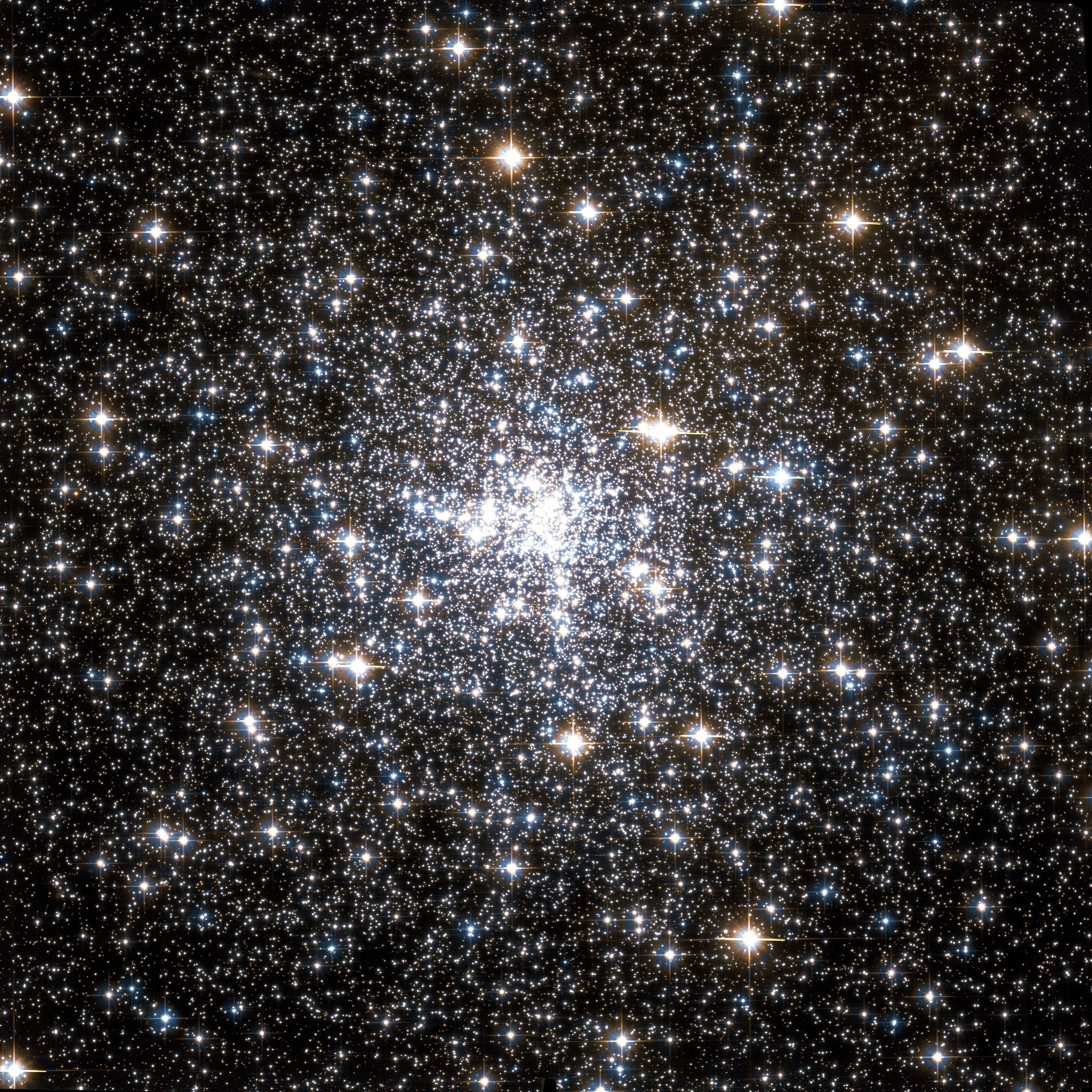
- NGC 6752 by Hubble Space Telescope; 3.5′ view

Observation data (J2000 epoch)
- Class: VI
- Constellation: Pavo
- Right ascension: 19^{h} 10^{m} 52.11^{s}
- Declination: –59° 59′ 04.4″
- Distance: 13.0 kly (4.0 kpc)
- Apparent magnitude (V): 5.4
- Apparent dimensions (V): 20.4′

Physical characteristics
- Mass: 1.4×10^{5} M_{☉}
- V_{HB}: 13.7
- Metallicity: [Fe/H] = –1.24 dex
- Estimated age: 11.78 Gyr
- Other designations: Caldwell 93, NGC 6777

NGC 6752 (also known as Caldwell 93 and nicknamed the Great Peacock Globular) is a globular cluster in the constellation Pavo. It is the fourth-brightest globular cluster in the sky, after Omega Centauri, 47 Tucanae and Messier 22, respectively. It is best seen from June to October in the Southern Hemisphere. It is also known as NGC 6777, though this identification is uncertain.

NGC 6752 was first identified by one James Dunlop of Parramatta on 30 June 1826, who described it as an irregular bright nebula which could be resolved into a cluster of many stars, highly compressed at the centre. This corresponds with a core region densely populated with stars around 1.3 light-years in diameter, which indicates it has undergone core collapse. The cluster lies around 13,000 light-years distant and is one of the closer globular clusters to Earth. It also lies 17,000 light-years away from the galactic centre. It belongs to Shapley–Sawyer Concentration Class VI, namely of intermediate density, and has been calculated to be 11.78 billion years old. There are many binary stars in the system, as well as blue stragglers, which are likely to have been formed by collisions and mergers of smaller stars.

The apparent magnitude of the cluster is 5.4, so it can be seen with the unaided eye. However this depends on good viewing conditions with a minimum of light pollution. With binoculars it can be seen to cover an area three quarters the size of the full moon. It lies 1.5 degrees east of 5th-magnitude Omega Pavonis. The nearest bright star is Peacock, which lies 3.25 degrees north and 9.25 degrees east.

Six X-ray sources have been identified in the cluster's core by the Chandra X-Ray Observatory.

== Gallery ==
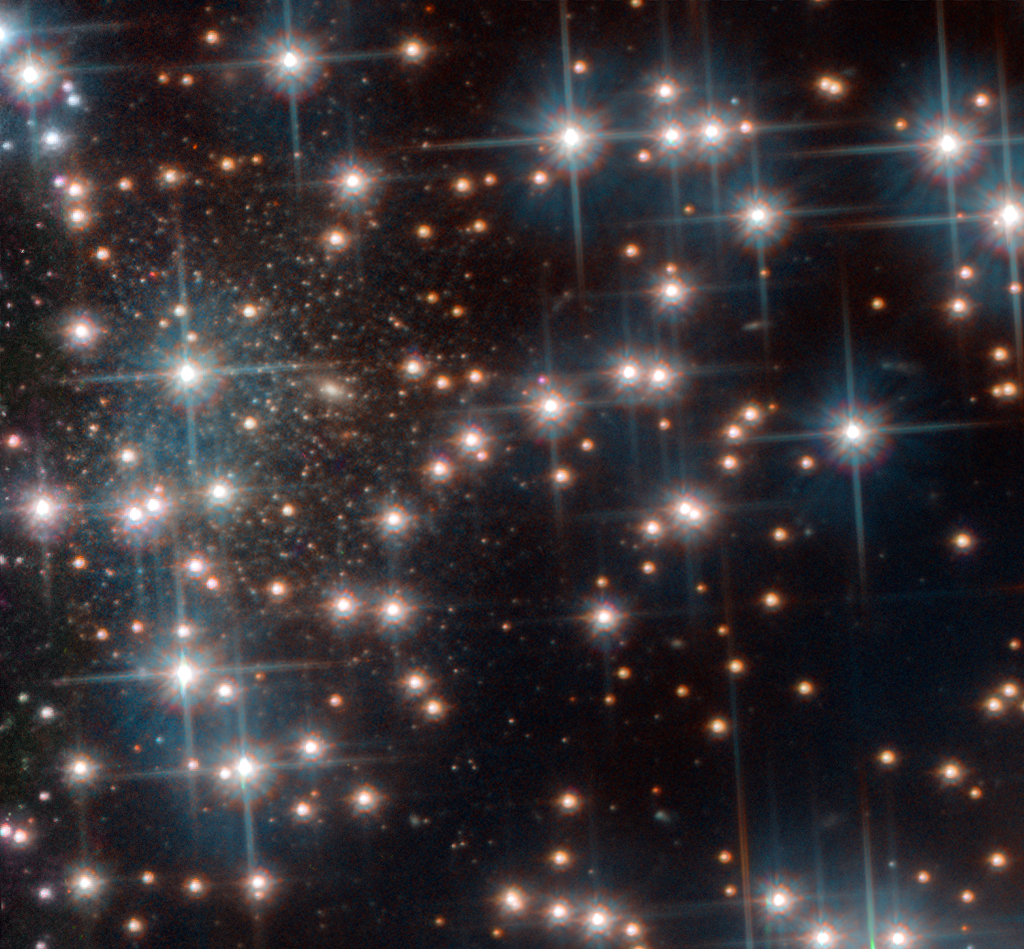
Galaxy nicknamed Bedin I is located behind the bright stars of the cluster.

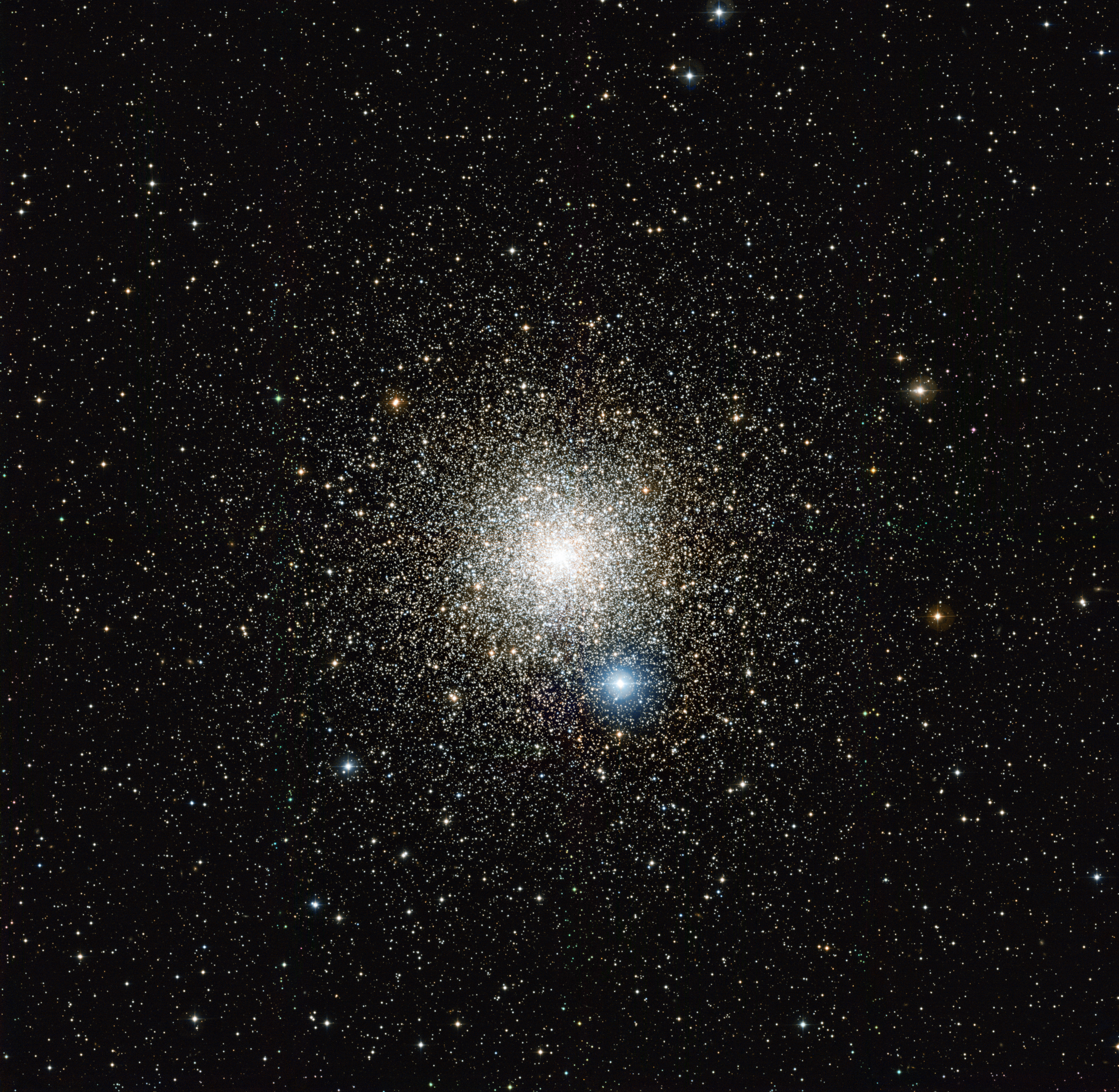
NGC 6752 taken by the Wide Field Imager on the MPG/ESO 2.2-meter telescope.

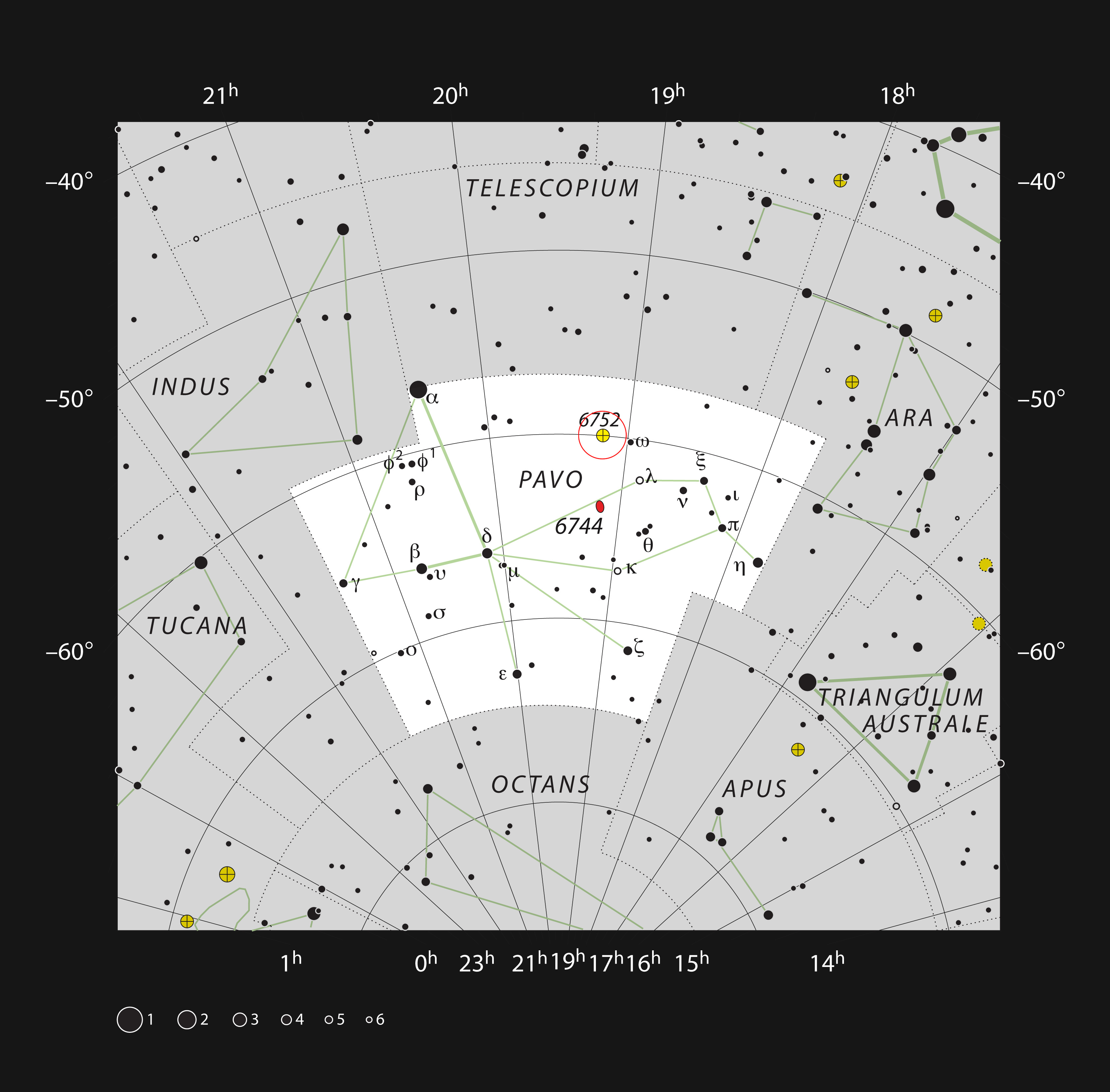
Map showing location of NGC 6752
