= Rahman (Bengali actor) =

Pakistani-Bangladeshi actor and film director

- রহমান
- Rehman in the 1960s
- Born: Abdur Rahman; 27 February 1937; Rosheya, Jalpaiguri District, Bengal, British India
- Died: 18 July 2005 (aged 68); Dhaka, Bangladesh
- Resting place: Panchagarh, Bangladesh
- Citizenship: Pakistan; Bangladesh
- Occupations: Actor, director, producer
- Years active: 1958–1993
- Notable work: Chanda; Harano Din

Abdur Rahman (known as Rahman; 27 February 1937 – 18 July 2005) was a Pakistani-Bangladeshi actor and film director. He acted in Bengali, Urdu, and Pashto films in Dhaka, Karachi, and Lahore from 1958 until 1993.

== Career ==
Rahman made his debut in Ehtesham's 1958 the Bengali film Ei Desh Tomar Amar, as a supporting actor in a negative role. He then acted as the lead actor in Rajdhanir Buke, along with Chitra Sinha, also directed by Ehtesham. He then performed in Harano Din (1960), Joar Bhata (1965), Notun Sur, Eai To Jiban, and Antaranga, along with Shabnam and Suchanda. He performed in other films including the Urdu films Chanda, Uttaran, Talash, Preet Na Jane Reet, Milan, Gori, Jaan Baje Shehnai, Bahana, Darshan, Kangan, Piyasa, Eindhan, and Chalo Maan Gaye. He acted with actress Shabnam in most films.

Rahman was injured in a road accident on the way back from shooting the film Preet Na Jane Reet (1963). He lost one leg afterwards. In 1964, he made his directorial debut with Milan. Deeba played the female lead in it for a token one rupee, and all the East Pakistani artistes contributed their services for free.

After the Bangladesh Liberation War in 1971, Rahman continued his film career in Pakistan, acting in the films Dosti, Nadan, Chahat, Do Sathi, Milan, Doraha, Lagan, Tum Salamat Raho, Dhamaka, Do Tasweerein, and 100 Rifles. Later, he returned to Dhaka and renewed his acting career. He then acted in the Bangla films Angshider, Devdas, Ghor Bhanga Shongshar, and Pahari Phul. The last film he acted in, "Aamar Shongsha" & "Takar Ahangker".

Rahman got into film production in the 1980s and produced several films including Milon.

== Filmography ==
- Ei Desh Tomar Amar (1959, Bengali)
- Rajdhanir Buke (1960, Bengali)
- Harano Din (1960, Bengali)
- Chanda (1962, Urdu)
- Talash (1963, Urdu)
- Milan (1964, Urdu), also director
- Bahana (1965, Urdu)
- Indhan (1966, Urdu), also director
- Darshan (1967, Urdu), also director
- Gori (1968, Urdu)
- Jahan Baje Shehnai (1968, Urdu), also director
- Joar Bhata (1969, Bengali)
- Kangan (1969, Urdu), also director
- Piyasa (1969, Urdu)
- Chalo Maan Gayai (1970, Urdu), also director
- Dosti (1971, Urdu)
- Nadan (1971, Urdu)
- Chahat (1974, Urdu)
- Do Sathi (1975, Urdu)
- Milan (1974, Urdu)
- Tum Salamat Raho (1976, Urdu)
- Lagan (1980, Urdu)
- Do Tasvirein (1977, Urdu)
- Doraha (1978, Urdu)
- Dhamakka (1979, Urdu)
- 100 Rifles (1981, Urdu)

== Awards ==
- Nigar Award
- Bachsas Award for Best Supporting Actor – 1982 for Devdas
