= Abdul Jabbar Khan (director) =

- আব্দুল জব্বার খান
- Born: April 20, 1916; Masadgaon village, Bengal Presidency, British India (now in Lohajang Upazila, Munshiganj District, Bangladesh)
- Died: 29 December 1993 (aged 76–77)
- Education: Ahsanullah School of Engineering
- Occupations: Engineer; Filmmaker

Abdul Jabbar Khan (20 April 1916 – 29 December 1993) was a Bangladeshi filmmaker. He was credited with directing Mukh O Mukhosh (1956), the first Bengali-language film ever made in the then East Pakistan (currently Bangladesh). The library of Bangladesh Film Development Corporation was named Abdul Jabbar Khan Library after him.

== Early life and education ==
Abdul Jabbar khan was born in Masadgoan village in Dhaka-Bikrampur Bengal Presidency, British India (now in Lohajang Upazila of Munshiganj District, Bangladesh) in 1916. During his school days, Khan performed in plays like "Behula", "Vishwamangal", "Satirtha", "Samajpati", "Matir Ghar", and "Sohrab Rustam". In 1941, he earned a diploma from Ahsanullah School of Engineering.

== Career ==
Khan founded Kamlapur Dramatic Association.

=== Mukh O Mukhosh ===
In 1953, at a cultural program, F. Dossani, a non-Bengali film producer, remarked that “The climate of this land is not fit for making movies.” Khan then decided to make a film based on his play "Dakaat". Khan released the film in Roopmahal Movie Theatre in Dhaka with the title Mukh O Mukhosh (The Face and the Mask) on 3 August 1956. He was the director, screenwriter and the lead actor of the film.

== Works ==
- Mukh O Mukhosh (1956)
- Joar Elo (1962)
- Nachghar (1963, Urdu)
- Banshari (1968)
- Kanch Kata Hira (1970)
- Khelaghar (1973)

== Awards ==
- Bangladesh Film Journalists Association Award
- FDC Silver Jubilee Medal
- Uttaran Medal
- Hiralala Sen Memorial Medal
- Gold Medal of the Bikrampur Foundation
