= Bashir Ahmad (singer) =

Pakistani-Bangladeshi singer (1939–2014)

Bashir Ahmed কামাল আহমেদ
- Born: 18 November 1939; Kolkata, Bengal Presidency, British India
- Died: 19 April 2014 (aged 74) Dhaka, Bangladesh
- Genres: Ghazal, playback singing
- Occupations: Singer; Composer; Lyricist
- Years active: 1960–2014
- Award: Independence Award (2026)

Bashir Ahmed (11 November 1939 – 19 April 2014) was a Pakistani-Bangladeshi playback singer, lyricist, and musician who started his career from Lollywood in the 1960s. He is known for his playback songs in the films Talash (1963) and Darshan (1967). He was awarded Ekushey Padak in 2005 by the Government of Bangladesh and Bangladesh National Film Award for Best Male Playback Singer for his performance in the film Kokhono Megh Kokhono Bristi (2003). He is known as East Pakistan's Ahmed Rushdi because his singing style is inspired by him.

== Early life ==
Born on 18 November 1939 in Kolkata, West Bengal, Ahmed migrated to Dhaka, East Bengal, after the partition period in 1960.

== Career ==
Ahmed became a pupil of Ustad Vilayat Hussain at the age of 15. Later, he came to Bombay, and became a student of Ustad Bade Ghulam Ali Khan.

Ahmed performed along with Geeta Dutt. Around the 1960s, when the film producer and owner of Gulistan Cinema Hall, Dossani invited Talat Mahmood and Ahmed to East Pakistan to perform, after their tour of Chittagong and Mymensingh, Mahmood returned to India but Ahmed decided to stay back.

In Dhaka, his mentor and brother-in-law, Ishrat Kalkatvi introduced him to Robin Ghosh. Kalkatvi was writing songs for the film Talash (1963), although eventually, Suroor Barabankvi contributed more songs to the film. Ghosh was making tunes for the film. Ahmed sang some numbers for Talash, including the soft romantic song "Kuch Apni Kahiye Kuch Meri Suniye, Yeh Sham Yeh Tanhai Yun Chup To Na Rahiye". Ahmed sang another song titled Main Rickshawalla Matwala. He had another duet in the film, "Tum Bhi Haseen Dil Bhi Jawan".

Ahmed was also a poet and a lyricist, with the pseudonym B. A. Deep. Filmmaker Mustafiz contacted Bashir and asked him to write a song for his film Saagar (1965), which he did, titled Ja dekha pyar tera, and sang it too. Similarly in Robin Ghosh's another lilting offering, Karwan, in 1964, Bashir wrote and sang Jab Tum Akele Hoge Hum Yaad Aayenge. He wrote film songs, as B. A. Deep, and also continued to sing as Bashir Ahmed for films like Saagar, Karwan, Indhan, Milan (1964), Kangan, Darshan (1967), Soye nadiya Jaage Paani (1967) and Jahan Baje Shehnai (1968). The songs from the films were Yeh Sama Pyara Pyara, Yeh Hawaein Thandi Tthandi (singer Mala), (Yeh mausam yeh mast nazare, pyar karo to inse karo), (Tumhare Liye Iss Dil Mein Itne Mohabbat Hai, Itne Mohabbat Kaun Karega Kahan Paoge Kis Dil Mein Hoge), (Din Raat Khayalon Mein Tujhe Yaad Karoonga, Par Naam Tera Leke Main Aawaz Na Doonga), (Hum Chale Chhor Kar Teri Mehfil Sanam, Dil Kahin Na Kahin To Behal Jayega), (Gulshan Mein Baharon Mein Tu Hai), and (Chun Liya Ik Phool Ko), with Madam Noor Jahan.

In 1971, when the situation worsened in Pakistan, he was not encouraged in the industry as music directors considered him a pale version of Ahmed Rushdi (who remained the greatest singer in the history of Pakistani cinema) and the film Hill Station's songs, namely Mera Dil Na Jaane Kabse Tera Pyar Dhoondta Hai and Mere Seene Par Sar Rakhdo remain his only contributions in this period.

A film that was made on the Dhaka Debacle in the late 1970s, called Sangtarash, also included his numbers, namely Bol Zara Kuch Duniya Wale and Mukhre Mein Chand, but the film, despite pleadings of the film-maker to the military regime of Zia, remained unreleased. So, he went back to Bangladesh in 1975 and continued his music career there.

As a playback singer in the Lollywood, Ahmed sang 61 songs in 24 Urdu films.

== Personal life and death ==
Ahmed was married to Meena Bashir (Born: 16 May, 1959 – Died: 8 August, 2014), a singer. Together they had a daughter, Humayra and a son, Raja Bashir.

Ahmed died on 19 April 2014, aged 74 at his residence in Mohammadpur, Dhaka, Bangladesh. He had been suffering from various diseases including cancer.

== Film songs ==
Year	Film	Song	Composer(s)	Songwriter(s)	Co-artist(s)
1964	Milon	"Tumi More Bhalobasho"	Khan Ataur Rahman	Suroor Barabankvi and B. A. Dweep	Sabina Yasmin
1966	Ujala	"Door Jahan Ke Jhamelon Se"	Dheer Ali Mansur	Akhtar Yousuf	solo
1967	Darshan	"Ye Mousam Ye Mast Nazaray"	Bashir Ahmed	Bashir Ahmed	solo
1969	Moner Moto Bou	"Aha Ki Je Sundor"	Khan Ataur Rahman	Khan Ataur Rahman	solo
1969	Moner Moto Bou	"Na Na Na Jeona"	Khan Ataur Rahman	Khan Ataur Rahman	solo
1969	Moynamoti	"Horin Horin Noyon Keno Chhol Chhol"	Bashir Ahmed	Gazi Mazharul Anwar, Syed Shamsul Haque	solo
1969	Moynamoti	"Anek Sadher Moyna Amar"	Bashir Ahmed	Gazi Mazharul Anwar, Syed Shamsul Haque	solo
1969	Moynamoti	"Dekona Amay Tumi Kachhe Dekona"	Bashir Ahmed	Gazi Mazharul Anwar, Syed Shamsul Haque	solo
1969	Qasm Us Waqt Ki (Urdu)	"Ek Main Hoon Ek Tum Ho"	Khan Ataur Rahman	Fayyaz Hashmi	Runa Laila
1969	Qasm Us Waqt Ki (Bengali)	"Duti Mon Matano Chhonde"	Khan Ataur Rahman	Khan Ataur Rahman	Runa Laila
1969	Shaheed Titumir (Urdu)	"Rooth Kar Yun Na Tum"	Mansur Ahmed	Fayyaz Hashmi	solo
1970	Antarango	"Bhool Jodi Hoy Modhur Emon"			solo
1970	Modhu Milon	"Shoponero Moto Lage"	Bashir Ahmed	Syed Shamsul Haque, Masud Karim, Shahidul Islam	solo
1970	Modhu Milon	"Achenare Dekhe Keno"	Bashir Ahmed	Syed Shamsul Haque, Masud Karim, Shahidul Islam	solo
1970	Modhu Milon	"Shono Kotha Shono"	Bashir Ahmed	Syed Shamsul Haque, Masud Karim, Shahidul Islam	solo
1970	Modhu Milon	"Adhare Alo Hoye"	Bashir Ahmed	Syed Shamsul Haque, Masud Karim, Shahidul Islam	Shahnaz Rahmatullah
1970	Pita Putro	"Pantho Ei Mon, Seto Maane Na Baron"	Satya Saha	Gazi Mazharul Anwar	solo
1974	Trirotno	"Chouchir Hiye Gechhe"	Khan Ataur Rahman		solo
1977	Moner Manush	"Prothom Premer Gopon Porosh"	Bashir Ahmed	Fazal-e-Khoda	Sabina Yasmin
1980	Rajkonya	"Chondro Taray Michhe Khujechhi Tomay"	Subal Das	M A Malek	Runa Laila

== Non-film songs ==
Year	Film	Song	Composer(s)	Songwriter(s)	Co-artist(s)
N/A	Single	"Sobai Amay Premik Bole"			Mina Bashir
