= Samar Das =

Bangladeshi musician and composer (1929–2001)

- Born: 10 December 1929; Dhaka, Bengal Presidency
- Died: 25 September 2001 (aged 71)
- Occupation: Musician
- Awards: Ekushey Padak; Independence Day Award

Samar Das (Bengali: সমর দাস; 10 December 1929 – 25 September 2001) was a Bangladeshi musician and composer. He became one of the most important music directors in Pakistan and subsequently Bangladesh and was the composer of over 2,000 songs.

== Early life ==
Samar Das was born into a Bengali Christian family in the Nabadwip Basak Lane of old Dhaka. His family was deeply involved with music and he received his initial training at home. He started his musical career playing the bansi (Indian flute), guitar and piano at the Dhaka center of All India Radio.

== Career as leading music director ==
In 1953, he joined His Master's Voice as a pianist in their backing orchestra. He became chief music director in 1966 of the Cultural Academy located in Karachi, Pakistan. Also in 1966, he led the Pakistan Delegation to the Commonwealth Music Festival in London. In 1967, he was appointed a music director at Dhaka Radio.

He was the music director for over 50 Bengali and Urdu films in India, Pakistan and Bangladesh. He was the first music director of the first movie of Bangladesh "Mukh-o-Mukhosh" directed and produced by Abdul Jabbar Khan. His most famous score for an Indian film was for the Bengali film from Kolkata, Lottery. He burst onto the Pakistan movie scene with his score for the first Bengali film made in Pakistan, Mukh O Mukhosh, and became famous overnight. Other famous scores under his direction were Asiya and Nabarun. He wrote the haunting melodies for one of the first films made in independent Bangladesh, Dhirey Bahey Meghna and was responsible for bringing Hemanta Mukherjee and Sandhya Mukhopadhyay, two of India's most prominent Bengali singers of the time, to Bangladesh to record the playback songs.

He was chosen to be the music director for the South Asian Federation Games, held in Dhaka, in both 1985 and 1995, where his orchestrations were seen and heard by an estimated audience of over 500 million across the SAARC countries during the opening and closing ceremonies.

Samar Das was the founding president of the Bangladesh Sangeet Parishad. In the year of 1987 Samar Das was appointed as chief music teacher to train up the students of Bangladesh Army Military Band in Dhaka Cantonment. He was assisted and communicated by the than Captain Ataur Rahman on behalf of chief of Bangladesh Army Lt. Gen Atiqur Rahman G+ (retd)

== Role as a freedom fighter ==
Samar Das played a prominent role in the Bangladesh War of Liberation in 1971. He was one of the chief organizers of the Swadhin Bangla Betar Kendra, the clandestine radio station broadcast to the Mukti Bahini liberation army and the general population under Pakistani occupation. Das was appointed as the Chief Musical Director of the radio station, and during this time, composed numerous patriotic songs that became immensely popular. Among these were Purba Digantey Surjya Uthechey, Bhebo Na Ma Go Tomar Chhelera and Nongar Tolo Tolo, Samay Je Holo Holo.

When Rabindranath Tagore's song Amar Shonar Bangla was chosen as the national anthem of Bangladesh, Das recognized that there was no Western notation of this piece for orchestras to play, as is common for national anthems. Das transcribed Tagore's song into Western notation, and rendered an almost martial version of what was originally a folk song. This version of the national anthem is still played every morning and evening on Bangladesh Television and radio.

Until a paralyzing stroke one year before his death, Samar Das was actively involved in cultural activities to highlight the Bangladesh Liberation War. In 1985, for instance, he worked with the Muktijoddha Kalyan Trust (Freedom Fighter Benevolence Trust) to compile a collection of songs from the liberation war featuring the original singers from the Swadhin Bangla Betar Kendra, to raise funds for the families of injured freedom fighters. The album was released in a set of two LP discs titled Ekti Phool Ke Bachabo Bole.

== Prizes and awards ==
- Ekushey Padak
- Independence Day Award (1979)

== See also ==
- Bangladesh liberation war
