= Purnima Sen =

- পূর্ণিমা সেন
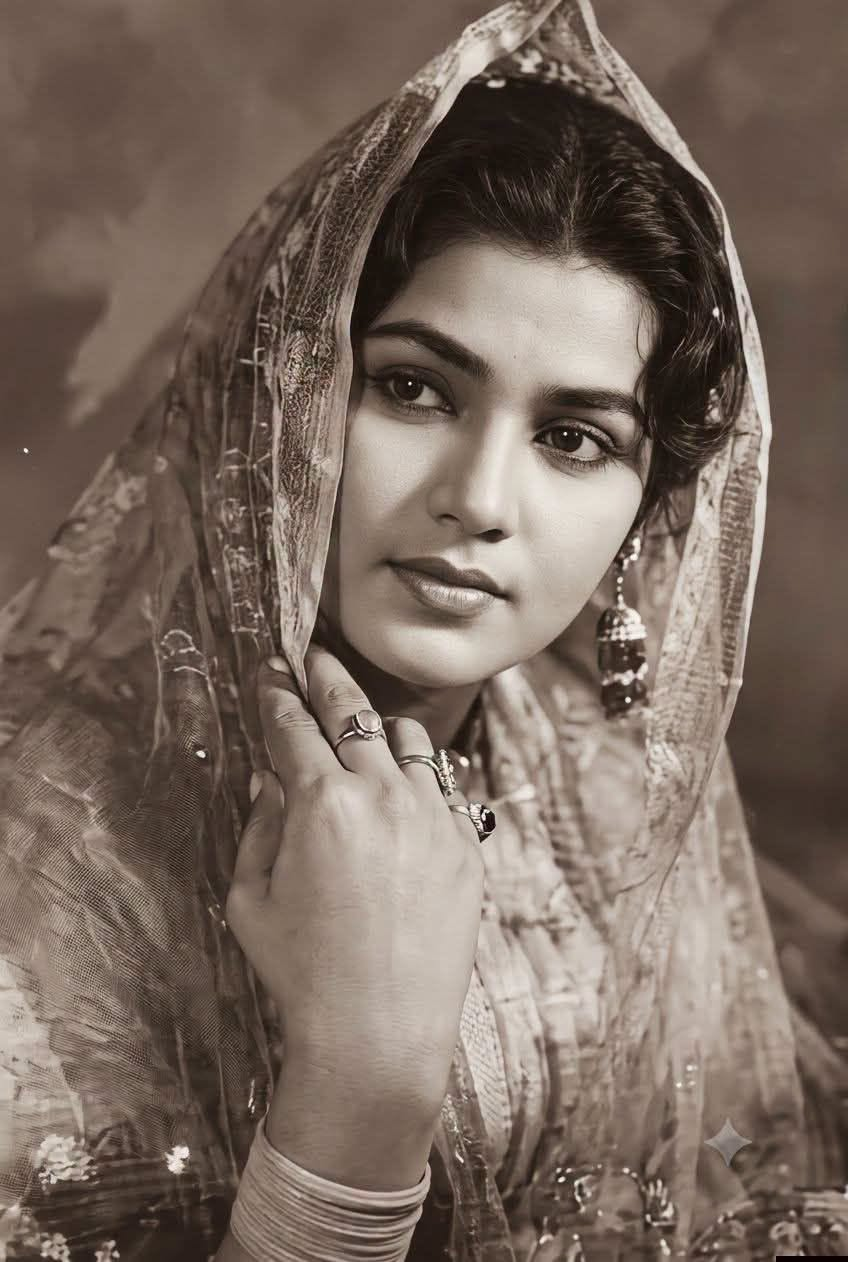
- Purnima Sen in the 1956 East Bengali film 'Mukh O Mukhosh'
- Born: Purnima Sengupta; September 25, 1934; Guwahati, Assam, British India
- Died: December 31, 1997 (aged 63); Dhaka, Bangladesh
- Other name: Parveen Banu
- Citizenship: Bangladeshi

Parveen Banu (née: Purnima Sengupta), most popularly known as Purnima Sen, was a Bangladeshi Bengali actress. She is often regarded as the first actress of Dhakai cinema.

== Early life ==
Parveen was born in Guwahati, Assam, British India. However, her ancestral home is in Patharghata, Barguna District in modern-day Barisal, Bangladesh. During her childhood, she alongside her family returned to East Bengal (now Bangladesh) and settled in Chittagong.

== Career ==
Parveen began her artistic career as a dancer in Chittagong. She gained early recognition in this field. Later, she began her acting career through Mukh O Mukhosh, the first sound film of then East Pakistan (now Bangladesh). She has starred in other renowned East Bengali/Bangladeshi films such as Kancher Deyal and Sonar Kajol.

== Personal life ==
In 1962, she married businessman and film producer Mohammad Nasir, converting to the Islamic faith and changing her name to Parveen Banu. She had a daughter from this marriage, Nasrin, a film actress and former wife to the renowned Bangladeshi actor Jashim.
