= Azim (actor) =

Bangladeshi film actor (1937–2003)

- Born: Nurul Azim Khaled Rauf; 23 July 1937; Habiganj, Sylhet district, Assam Province
- Died: 26 March 2003 (aged 65)
- Occupation: Actor
- Spouse: Sujata (m. 1967)

Azim (1937 – 26 March 2003) was a Bangladeshi film actor. He is best known for his role in Rupban (1965) as Rahim Badshah opposite Sujata.

== Early and personal life ==
Nurul Azim Khaled Rauf was born on 23 July 1937 to a Bengali Muslim family in Habiganj, Sylhet district. His father served as a judge in several parts of Bengal, eventually settling in Hatkhola, Dhaka.

Azim married actress Sujata on 30 June 1967.

== Career ==
Azim debuted in the 1960 film Rajdhanir Buke. In 1961, he appeared in Harano Din. He appeared in cult hit Rupban in 1965. Later, he appeared in several films in the 1960s and 1970s. Banglar Nayok was his last film. He appeared in a total of 53 movies.

== Works ==
- Rajdhanir Buke (1960)
- Harano Din (1961)
- Natun Sur (1962)
- Paise (1962)
- Bewaqoof (1962)
- Rupban (1965)
- Mala (1965)
- Chena Ochena (1967)
- Beder Meye (1969)
- Tansen (1970)
- Santan (1970)
- Mishor Kumari (1970)
- Takar Khela (1974)
- Protinidhi (1976)
- Banglar Nayok (1995)
