= Golam Mustafa =

Bangladeshi actor (1934 - 2003)

- গোলাম মুস্তাফা
- Born: 2 March 1934; Dapdapia, Barisal, Bengal Province, British India (now in Jhalokati district, Bangladesh)
- Died: 20 February 2003 (aged 68)
- Education: University of Dhaka
- Occupation: Actor
- Children: 2, including Suborna Mustafa
- Awards: Ekushey Padak

Golam Mustafa (2 March 1934 – 20 February 2003) was a Bangladeshi actor and reciter.

== Early life and career ==
Mustafa first acted in a play named Pallimangal in Barisal in 1945.

== Filmography ==
- Harano Din - 1961
- Chanda - 1962
- Kajal - 1965
- Nadi-O-Nari - 1965
- Binimoy - 1970
- Dhire Bohe Meghna - 1973
- Titash Ekti Nadir Naam - 1973
- Masud Rana - 1974
- Simana Periye - 1977
- Sareng Bou - 1978
- Emiler Goenda Bahini - 1980
- Devdas - 1982
- Annay Abichar - 1985
- Shatru - 1986
- Chhutir Phande - 1990
- Dipu Number Two - 1996
- Ranga Bou - 1998
- Srabon Megher Din - 1999

== Awards ==
- Ekushey Padak (2001).
- National Film Award
- Bangladesh Film Journalist Association Award

== Legacy ==
Bangladesh Recitation Coordinating Council introduces Gholam Mustafa Recitation Medal for contribution to recitation industry. Since 2017, the medal has been awarded every year on 20 February, Mustafa's death anniversary.

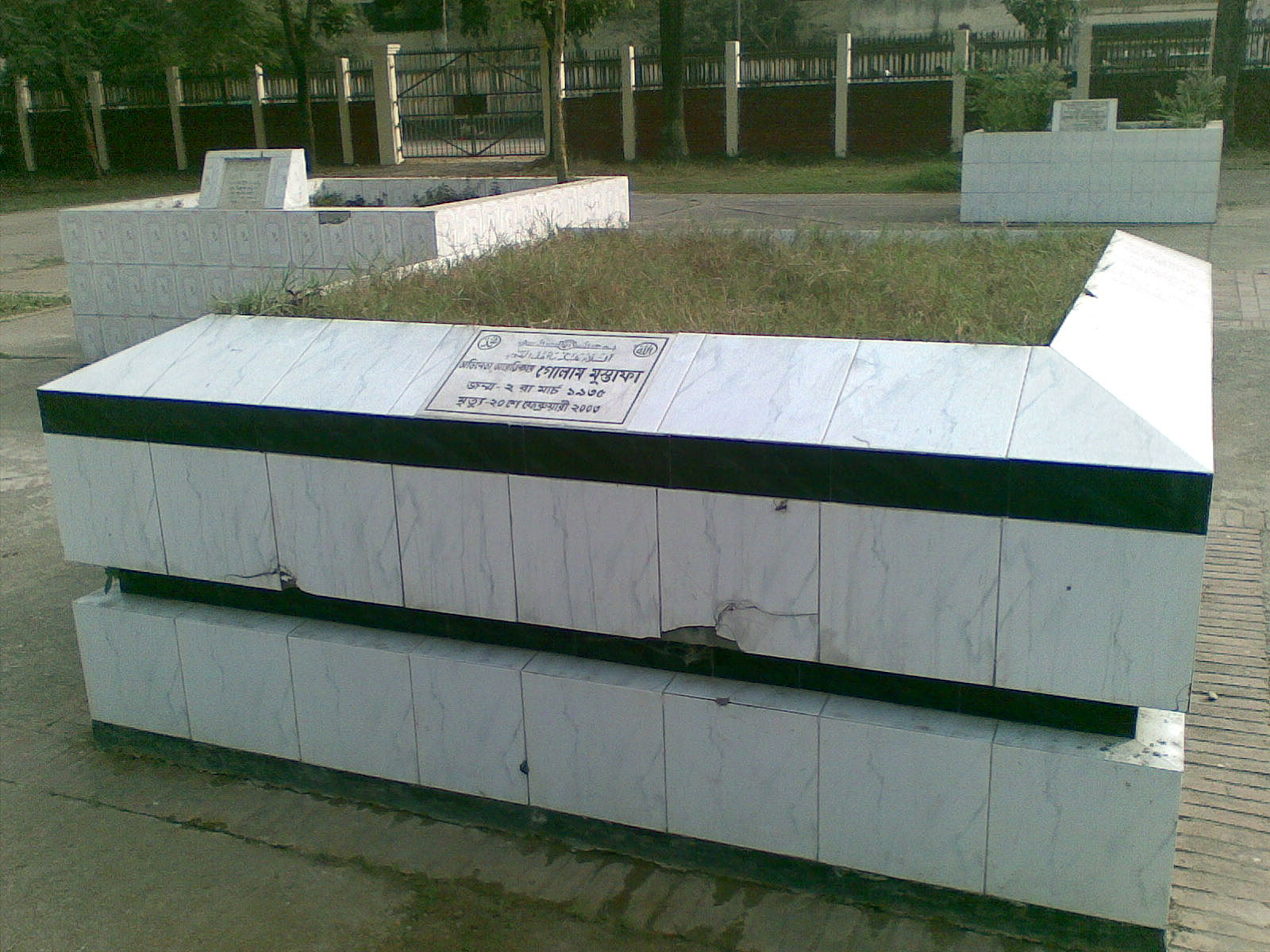
Grave of Mustafa in Martyred Intellectuals Graveyard, Mirpur
