= Harano Din =

1961 Bengali-language film directed by Mustafiz

- Poster of Harano Din
- Directed by: Mustafiz
- Produced by: Ehtesham
- Starring: Rahman; Shabnam; Ghulam Mustafa
- Music by: Robin Ghosh
- Release date: 4 August 1961
- Country: Pakistan
- Language: Bengali

Harano Din (Bengali: হারানো দিন; English: The Lost Days) is a 1961 East Pakistani Bengali-language film directed by Mustafiz and starring Shabnam and Ghulam Mustafa in the lead roles. Mustafiz's brother Ehtesham produced the movie. Ferdousi Rahman crooned the evergreen hit song "Ami Rupnagarer Rajkanya", composed by Robin Ghosh.

== Story ==
Mala is a snake charmer's daughter. Rich landlord Bashir Chowdhury has his evil eyes on her. He tries to rape her, but Mala escapes.

== Cast ==
- Shabnam as Mala (snake charmer's daughter)
- Rahman as Bashir Chowdhury
- Subhash Dutta

== Music ==
The film's music was composed by Robin Ghosh.

Track No	Title	Singer(s)
1	"Ami Rupnagarer Rajkanya"	Ferdousi Rahman
2	"Obhimaan Korona"	Nazmul Huda Bachchu

== Reception ==
Alamgir Kabir wrote that the film did "good to tolerable business". This was in marked contrast to most Bengali films made in Dhallywood until 1965, ninety percent of which were financial disasters.
