= Mukh O Mukhosh =

1956 East Pakistani film

- Theatrical release poster
- Directed by: Abdul Jabbar Khan
- Written by: Abdul Jabbar Khan
- Produced by: Nuruzzaman; Shahidul Alam
- Starring: Inam Ahmed; Zahrat Ara; Ali Mansoor; Abdul Jabbar Khan; Kazi Khaliq; Purnima; Saifuddin Ahmed
- Cinematography: Q. M. Zaman (Kazi Mesbahuzzaman)
- Edited by: M. A. Latif
- Music by: Samar Das
- Distributed by: Pakistan Film Trust
- Release date: 3 August 1956
- Running time: 99 minutes
- Country: East Pakistan (present day Bangladesh)
- Language: Bengali
- Budget: Rs. 64,000 (equivalent to Rs. 330,000 or ৳140,000 in 2021)
- Box office: Rs. 48,000 (equivalent to Rs. 240,000 or ৳110,000 in 2021)

Mukh O Mukhosh (Bengali: মুখ ও মুখোশ, lit. ''The Face and the Mask'') was the first Bengali-language feature film to be made in East Pakistan (now Bangladesh). It was produced by Iqbal Films and directed by Abdul Jabbar Khan. Nuruzzaman (d. 1975) was the founder producer of Iqbal Films. The film was released in East Pakistan on 3 August 1956. It was released in Dhaka, Chittagong, Narayanganj, and Khulna. The film was commercially successful as viewers were enticed to watch the first feature film to be made in the region. It earned a total of Rs. 48,000 during its initial run.

== Background ==
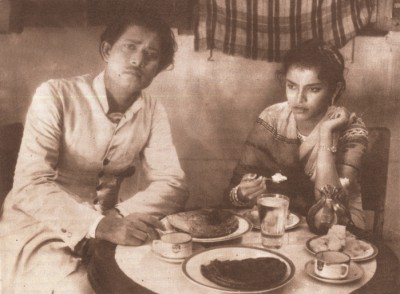
Ali Mansoor and Zahrat Ara in a scene.

A film titled Sukumari (The Good Girl) was made in 1928, which is claimed to be the first Bengali-produced short film in the region. Also The Last Kiss, a silent feature film, was produced by the Dhaka Nawab family and released in 1931. But Mukh O Mukhosh became the first full-feature sound film produced in East Bengal (later East Pakistan and then Bangladesh) region.

In the early 1950s, the film industry in erstwhile East Bengal was virtually non-existent, and local film theatres screened mostly Urdu films from Lahore, Hindi films from Mumbai, and Bengal films from Kolkata. To establish the film-making infrastructures, a meeting was held in 1953, arranged by Abdus Sadek, the then director of East Bengal Bureau of Statistics. In the meeting, Fazle Dossani, a West Pakistani film distributor, claimed the local climate was not suitable for film production. Khan challenged him and started planning to make a feature film. He went to Kolkata and discussed with Moni Bose, a notable Indian scriptwriter, to select the story for the film. Q. M. Zaman (d. 1999), who has worked as an assistant director in films in Kolkata and Mumbai, accompanied him on this trip. Khan primarily planned to make the film from the literary works of Kazi Nazrul Islam or Jasimuddin. But Bose selected Dakaat (Robbers), a play, and later a novel, written by Khan inspired by a true story of robbery published in newspapers. Bose himself wrote the first 3 scenes. Khan finished the rest and started working on the film in 1953.

== Cast ==
- Inam Ahmed
- Aminul Haque
- Zahrat Ara
- Abdul Jabbar Khan
- Kazi Khaliq
- Purnima Sengupta
- Piyari Begum
- Saifuddin Ahmed
- Abul Khair
- Sona Mia
- Bilkis Bari
- Ali Mansoor
- Rafiq
- Nurul Anam Khan
- Golam Mostafa

== Production ==
During his trip to Kolkata to meet Moni Bose, Khan met Q. M. Zaman's mentor, photographer Murari Mohan, who advised Khan to buy an old film camera. An ordinary Philips tape recorder took the sound of the film.

The shooting for the film began in December 1953 in Kaliganj.

Moinul Islam worked on the sound design, and the poster was created by Subhash Dutta, who later became a notable director. Dhir Ali Miah worked as assistant music director of the film. Later he directed music of films like Nachghar, Ujala, Joyar Elo, Kavchanmala, Abar Banabase Rupbhan, Dasyurani, and Kajalrekha.[1]

Q. M. Zaman served as the cinematographer. Shyam Babu was the make-up artist.

Meanwhile, the director of the film was a bit worried about how the film's songs would be and who would write the songs. Then suddenly he requested his friend Mr. M, A, Gafur (Sarathee) to write the songs for this film. Mr. Sarathee also grabbed this opportunity. All lyrics were written by M. A. Gafur (Sharathee). Playback singers for the two songs in the film were Abdul Alim and Mahbuba Rahman. However, the song by Abdul Alim is lost, as the film of that part of the film has deteriorated completely. Mahbuba sang the other song in the film - Moner Boney Dola Laage Hashlo Dokhin Hawa. Samar Das was the music director and Bhir Ali was his assistant.

It took more than two years to finish the production. Kalim Uddin Dudu Miah (father of actor Alamgir) and Nuruzzaman from Iqbal Films were the producers of this venture.

In the absence of any local film production studios, the negatives of the film had to be taken to Lahore for development.

== Release ==
Even though the film production started in December 1953, it was 6 August 1954 when the inaugural ceremony (muhurat) took place at Hotel Shahbagh (now defunct) in Dhaka. It was inaugurated by the then governor of East Bengal Iskander Mirza.

On 3 August 1956, the film was released at Rupmahal Cinema Hall (now defunct) in Sadarghat. The release ceremony was inaugurated by the then Governor of East Pakistan (Note: East Bengal region is renamed East Pakistan on 14 October 1955 which occurred during the production of this film.) A. K. Fazlul Huq. Other three prints of the film were shown at Nirala in Chittagong, Diamond in Narayanganj and Ullasini Cinema Hall in Khulna.

== Legacy ==
In August 2022, the original script, behind-the-scenes stills, and a piano used in the film were officially handed over to the Bangladesh Film Archive (BFA) by Jasmine Zaman who was the daughter of Nuruzzaman, the owner of Iqbal Films. The composer Samar Das used the piano to write the score of the film. Nuruzzaman bought the piano, built by J. J. Hopkinson Piano Company between 1881 and 1892, from a British who was the then managing director of Dhakeshwari Cotton Mills in Narayanganj.
