= KKR 25 =

Galaxy in the constellation Draco

Observation data (J2000 epoch)
- Constellation: Draco
- Right ascension: 16^{h} 13^{m} 47.9^{s}
- Declination: +54° 22′ 16″
- Redshift: −0.000465
- Heliocentric radial velocity: −139 km/s
- Distance: 6.37 ± 0.35 Mly (1.954 ± 0.108 Mpc)
- Apparent magnitude (V): 15.9
- Absolute magnitude (V): −10.55

Characteristics
- Type: Irr

Other designations
- PGC 2801026

KKR 25 is an isolated dwarf spheroidal galaxy in the constellation Draco, approximately 6.3 million light-years (1.93 megaparsecs) from Earth. It lies outside the Local Group and contains predominantly old stars. Unlike most dwarf spheroidal galaxies, it is far from any massive galaxy, making it useful for investigating how such systems develop in isolation.

== Discovery and classification ==
KKR 25 was discovered in 1999 during a search for dwarf galaxies towards the Local Void conducted by Valentina Karachentseva, Igor Karachentsev and G. M. Richter. Observations with the Hubble Space Telescope resolved the galaxy into individual stars, revealing a prominent population of red giants and a small number of blue stars. It was initially classified as a transitional galaxy between a dwarf irregular and a dwarf spheroidal.

KKR 25 was reclassified as a dwarf spheroidal galaxy after deeper radio observations with the Giant Metrewave Radio Telescope failed to confirm an earlier detection of hydrogen gas. Its apparent gas content had contributed to its initial classification as an intermediate system between a dwarf irregular and a dwarf spheroidal galaxy. The earlier signal was probably emission from gas in the Milky Way along the same line of sight.

== Physical characteristics ==
KKR 25 is a faint, diffuse galaxy with a measured diameter of approximately 540 parsecs (1,800 light-years). Its size and low surface brightness are comparable to those of dwarf galaxies within the Local Group. It has an elongated appearance, with its projected short axis approximately half the length of its long axis. The density of stars decreases towards its outskirts, while the central region has a relatively flat distribution rather than a sharply concentrated peak.

== Stellar population ==
Reconstructions of its star formation history indicate that roughly 60 per cent of its stellar mass formed between 12.6 and 13.7 billion years ago. These stars are metal-poor, containing relatively small amounts of elements heavier than helium. There is also evidence of a later period of star formation between one and four billion years ago.

Hubble observations have identified 46 RR Lyrae variable stars and 25 anomalous Cepheids in KKR 25. No classical Cepheids were detected, indicating that the galaxy lacks a substantial young stellar population.

A planetary nebula was identified in the galaxy through spectroscopy with the Russian 6-metre telescope. Reported in 2012, it was the first known planetary nebula in a dwarf spheroidal galaxy outside the Local Group.

== Environment and evolution ==
KKR 25 is among the most isolated galaxies in the vicinity of the Local Group. Its nearest known neighbour is the dwarf galaxy KKR 03, more than one megaparsec away. The nearest major concentrations of galaxies are the Local Group and the M81 Group.

Dwarf spheroidal galaxies are usually found near massive galaxies, where interactions can affect their gas content and star formation. KKR 25 and the similarly isolated KKs 3 show that galaxies with these characteristics can also develop far from massive neighbours. Their isolation suggests that internal processes, rather than interactions with nearby galaxies, played an important role in their evolution.

== See also ==
- Galaxy
- List of nearest galaxies
