= Samadi =

Samadi (Arabic: صمدی) is a surname.

== Notable people with the name include ==
- Ibtisam al-Samadi (born 1955), Syrian poet and academic
- Mohamed Samadi (born 1970), Moroccan soccer player
- Salah Samadi (born 1976), Algerian soccer player
