= Aminul Haque (actor) =

Bangladeshi actor (1921–2011)

- আমিনুল হক
- Born: 1 July 1921; Calcutta, Bengal Presidency, British India
- Died: 31 July 2011 (aged 90); Dhaka, Bangladesh
- Occupation: Actor
- Years active: 1944-2008
- Notable work: Mukh O Mukhosh; Akash Ar Mati
- Spouses: Pyari Begum

Aminul Haque (1921–2011) was a Bangladeshi actor, known for his role in Mukh O Mukhosh, the first Bengali-language feature film to be made in East Pakistan. He was married to actress Pyari Begum (d. 2023) who also had a role in Mukh O Mukhosh.

== Filmography ==
- Mandir
- Mukh O Mukhosh (1956)
- Akash Ar Mati (1959)
- Tomar Amar (1961)
- Jowar Elo (1962)
- Godhulir Prem (1965)
- Aporajeyo (1967)
- Epar Opar (1975)
- Achena Atithi (1978)
- Nazma (1983)
- Chapa Dangar Bou (1986)
- Rabeya (2008) as Emdad Kazi's uncle

== Honours ==
Haque was awarded the Ekushey Padak in 1991 for his contributions to drama.
