= Subhash Dutta =

Bangladeshi film director and actor (1930–2012)

- সুভাষ দত্ত
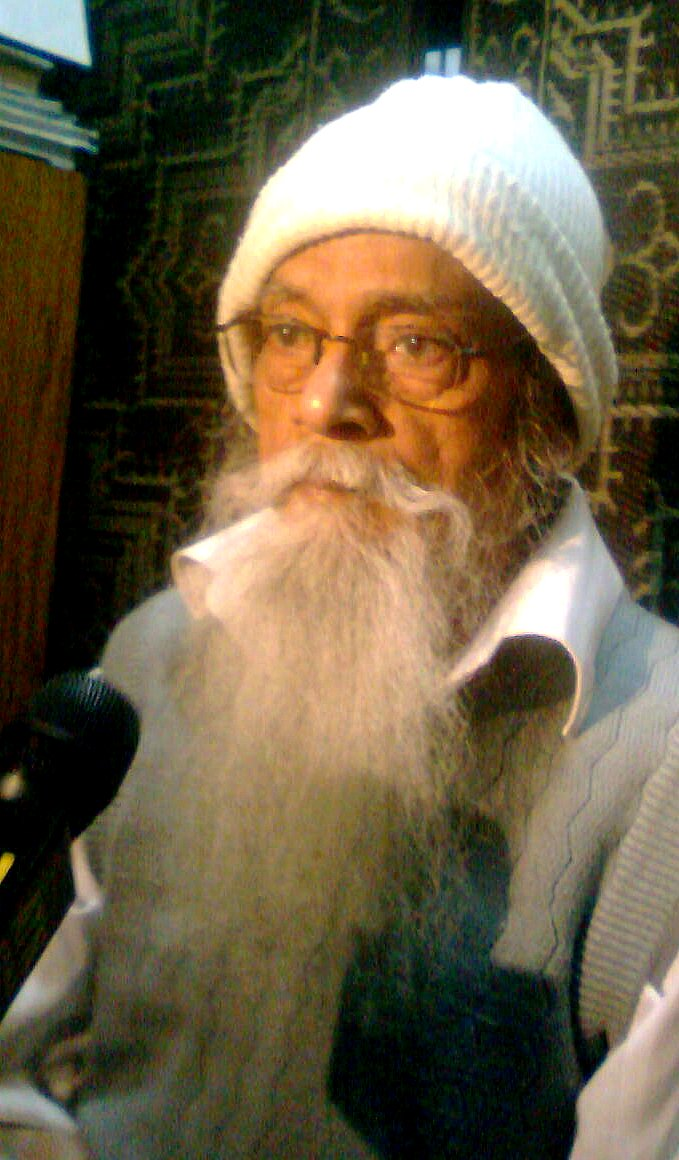
- Dutta, during a TV interview in 2012
- Born: 9 February 1930; Dinajpur, Bengal Presidency, British India
- Died: 16 November 2012 (aged 82); Dhaka, Bangladesh
- Occupations: Filmmaker, actor, designer
- Spouse: Shima Dutta (–2001; widower)
- Awards: National Film Awards (1977); Ekushey Padak (1999)

Subhash Dutta (9 February 1930 – 16 November 2012) was a Bangladeshi filmmaker, theater and film actor. He started his career as a commercial artist. Dutta was heavily influenced by Satyajit Ray and his deep affection towards Satyajit earned him the nickname "Duttajit".

== Career ==
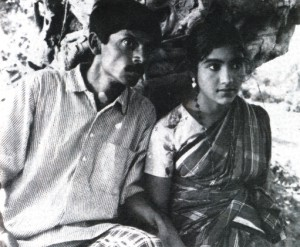
Dutta and Kabori in the film Sutorang

At the beginning of his career, Dutta worked as a film poster artist. He drew posters for Mukh O Mukhosh (1956), the first Bengali-language movie to be made in East Pakistan (now Bangladesh). He directed his first movie, Sutorang, in 1964. The movie won the second prize at the Frankfurt Festival in 1965. In 1972, he acted with the theatrical group, Aranyak Nattyadal.

== Awards ==
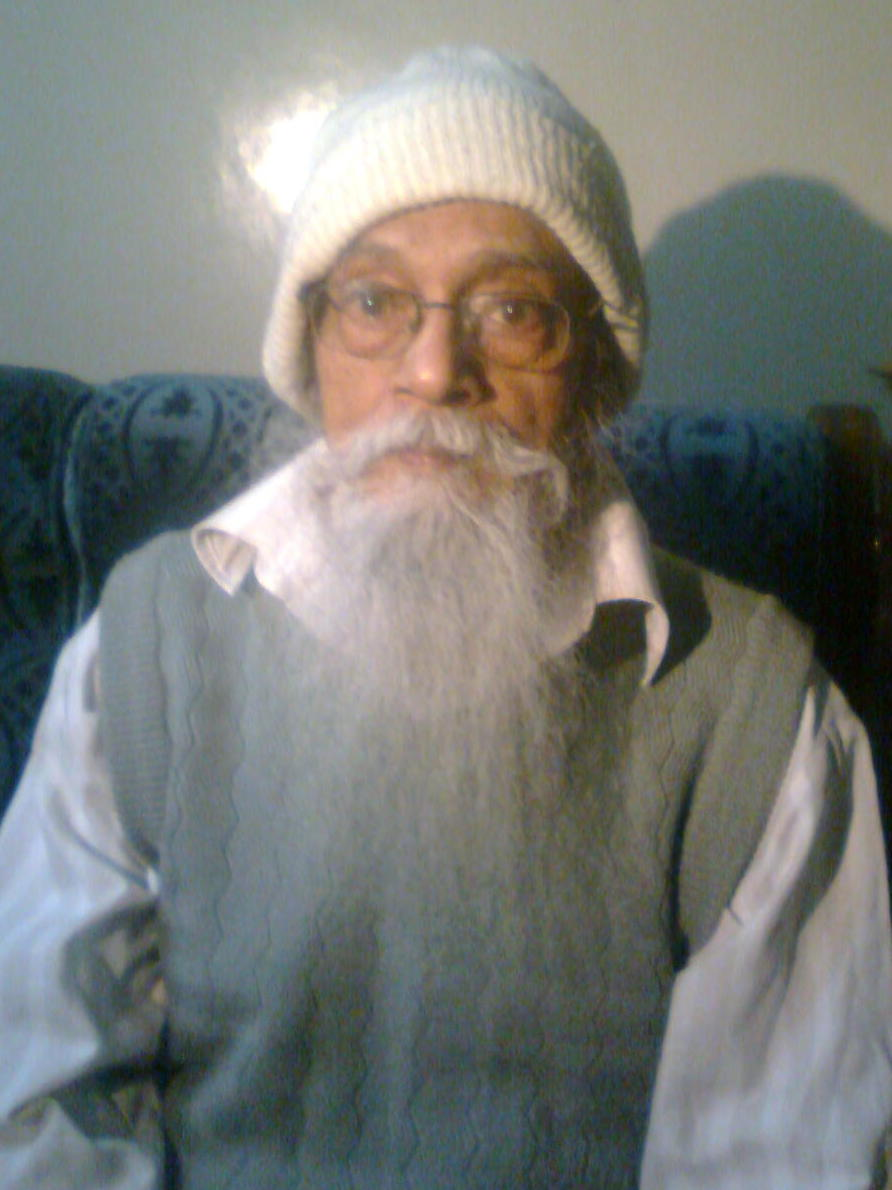
Dutta in 2012

- Bangladesh National Film Award for Best Director (1976)
- Ekushey Padak (1999)
- Nigar Award (1962)

His directed movies were awarded at the Phnom Penh Film Festival (1968) and the Moscow Film Festival (1967, 1973, 1979). He also got an award for his acting from the Pakistan Film Festival (1965).

== Personal life and death ==
Dutta had two sons, Shivaji and Ranaji, and two daughters, Shilpi and Shotabdi.

Dutta died from heart disease on 16 November 2012 at his home in Ram Krishna Mission Road, Dhaka.

== Filmography ==
Director

- Sutorang (1964)
- Aina Obo Shishta (1966)
- Kagazer Nouka (1966)
- Abirbhab (1968)
- Alingan (1969)
- Pala Bodal (1969)
- Binimoy (1970)
- Akankha (1976)
- Arunodoyer Agnishakkhi (1972)
- Bashundhara (1977)
- Dumurer Phul (1978)
- Sabujsathi (1982)
- Nazma (1983)
- Sakal Sandha (1984)
- Phulshajya
- Abdaar
- Swami-Stri (1987)
- O Aamar Chhele (2008)

Actor

- Ei Desh Tomar Amar (1959)
- Harano Din (1961)
- Rajdhanir Buke (1961)
- Chanda (1962)
- Notun Sur (1962)
- Surja Snan (1962)
- Talash (1963)
- Milan (1964)
- Paisay (1964)
- Sutorang (1964)
- Aakhri Station (1965)
- Kaise Kahun (1965)
- Kajal (1965)
- Nadi-o-Nari (1965)
- Rupban (1965)
- Saagar (1965)
- Aina Obo Shishta (1966)
- Phir Milinge Hum Dono (1966)
- Abirbhab (1968)
- Alingan (1969)
- Pala Bodal (1969)
- Chalo Maan Gayai (1970)
- Kolkata 71
- Noya Micchil
- Ayna (2004)
- O Amar Chhele (2006)
