= Ehtesham =

Bangladeshi/Pakistani film director (1927–2002)

- Born: 1927; Dacca, Bengal Presidency, British India
- Died: 17 February 2002 (age 75); Dhaka, Bangladesh
- Occupation: film director
- Years active: 1959–1996
- Known for: Ei Desh Tomar Amar (1959), Chakori (1967)
- Relatives: Nadeem (son-in-law)

Ehtesham ur Rahman (1927 – 17 February 2002), known as Captain Ehtesham, was a Bangladeshi and Pakistani film director. On his death in 2002 he was described as a pioneer of the film industry in Dhaka, and one of Bangladesh's leading directors.

== Birth and early life ==
Ehtesham was born in Dhaka on 12 October 1927. His father, Mohammad Yusuf, was a professor at Islamia College and his mother, Mosammat Kaniz Fatema, was a house wife.

== Career ==
Ehtesham first became a film cinema distributor in 1950. He was credited with the discovery of many noted actors. In 1956 he began his first film, Ei Desh Tomar Amar ("This country is yours and mine"), which marked the first film acting appearance for both Subhash Dutta and Shabnam. Another discovery was actor Nadeem, who later married Ehtesham's daughter. Ehtesham directed Nadeem and actress Shabana in Nadeem's debut (and Shabana's first Urdu film) Chakori in 1967. He made successful films in Urdu and then, after the independence of Bangladesh, in Bengali. He also launched two other successful actresses – Shabnur in Chandni Raatey (1993) and Munmun in Moumachi (1996).

== Filmography ==
- Ei Desh Tomar Amar (1959)
- Rajdhanir Buke (1961)
- Chanda (1962, Urdu)
- Notun Sur (1962)
- Saagar (1965, Urdu)
- Chakori (1967, Urdu)
- Chand Aur Chandni (1968, Urdu)
- Daagh (1969, Urdu)
- Peech Dhala Path (1970)
- Mitti Ke Putlay (1974)
- Shakti (1984)
- Chandni (1991)
- Chandni Raatey (1993)
- Moumachi (1996)

== See also ==
- Cinema of Bangladesh
