= List of Bangladeshi films of 2023 =

This is a list of Bangladeshi films that were released in 2023. After their complete runs in theatres, it was reported that a total of 50 films were released in 2023. Films listed as "untitled" do not yet have publicly announced titles.

== Box office collection ==
The top ten highest-grossing Bangladeshi films released in 2023, by worldwide box office gross revenue, are as follows.

Background color indicates the current releases.

Highest-grossing films of 2023
Rank	Title	Production company / distributor	Domestic gross	Worldwide gross	Ref
1	Priyotoma	Versatile Media	৳42 crore (US$3.4 million)	৳44 crore (US$3.6 million)	
2	Surongo	Alpha-i & Chorki	৳15 crore (US$1.2 million)	৳15 crore (US$1.2 million)	
3	Leader: Amie Bangladesh	Bengal Multimedia	৳9.5 crore (US$770,000)	৳9.5 crore (US$770,000)	
4	Mujib: The Making of a Nation	BFDC; NFDC	US$176,864	US$544,072	(Note: BFDC sources reported a gross of approximately ৳19.1 million ($176,864) during its first phase of release in Bangladesh. In India, it grossed ₹2.73 crore ($330,559) in 8 days. Box Office Mojo reported $15,539 from the UK and UAE in the month of its release. The Numbers reported $21,110 from Australia. Combined, these figures total $544,072.)

== January–March ==
Opening		Title	Production company	Cast and crew	Ref
J A N	13	Black War: Mission Extreme 2	Cop Creations	Sunny Sanwar and Faisal Mahmud (director); Arifin Shuvoo, Jannatul Ferdous Oishee	
J A N	20	Adventure of Sundarbans	Bongo BD	Abu Raihan Jewel (director); Siam Ahmed, Pori Moni	
J A N	27	Saatao	Crowdfunded production	Khandaker Sumon (director): Aynun Putul, Fazlul Haque	
F E B	3	Birkonna Pritilata	Government funded	Pradip Ghosh (director); Nusrat Imrose Tisha, Manoj Pramanik, Kamruzzaman Tapu	
F E B	3	Bhagya	Halima Kathachitra / The Abhi Kathachitra	Mahabubur Rashid (director); Nipun Akter, Munna, Masum Aziz, Jasmin, Sangku Panja, Gangua, Sabiha Zaman, Gulshan Ara	
F E B	10	Kotha Dilam	Joshim Uddin	Rokibul Alam (director); Keya, Jamshed Shameem, Somu Chowdhury	
F E B	10	Mon Diyechi Tare	Sami Banichitra "10crprer"	Mostafizur Rahman Babu (director); Asif Imrose, Amrita Khan, Sujata, Sadek Bachchu	
F E B	17	Bubujaan	Shapla Media	Shamim Ahamed Roni (director); Mahiya Mahi, Shanto Khan, Nishat Salwa, Saberi Alam	
F E B	24	Mayar Jonjal (Debris of Desire)	Joshim Ahmed, Flipbook, and Bangladesh - India joint venture	Indranil Roychowdhury (director); Aupee Karim, Ritwick Chakraborty, Shohel Mondol, Chandrayee Ghosh, Bratya Basu, Kamalika Banerjee, Paran Bandopadhyay	
M A R	3	Ora 7 Jon	KHK Productions	Khijir Hayat Khan (director); Zakia Bari Mamo, Intekhab Dinar	
M A R	3	JK 1971	Gorai Films and Tanvir A Mishuk	Fakhrul Arefeen Khan (director); Francisco Raymond, Sabyasachi Chakrabarty, Sourav Shuvro Das, Indrajit Mazumder, Deria Gvrusenko, Nikolai Novominaski	
M A R	10	Radio	Taranga Production	Anonno Mamun (director); Zakia Bari Momo, Riaz, Lutfur Rahman George	
M A R	10	Ekti Na Bola Golpo	Pankaj Palit	Pankaj Palit (director); Rawnak Hasan, Pran Roy	

== April–June ==
Opening		Title	Production company	Cast and crew	Ref
APR	22	Leader: Amie Bangladesh	Bengal Multimedia	Topu Khan (director); Shakib Khan, Shobnom Bubly	
APR	22	Kill Him		Md Jubaer (director); Ananta Jalil, Afiea Nusrat Barsha, Misha Sawdagor, Masum Parvez Rubel, & Rahul Dev	
APR	22	Jin	Jaaz Multimedia	Nader Chowdhury (director); Abdul Noor Shajal, Puja Cherry, Ziaul Roshan	
APR	22	Shatru	Ahriddha Films	Sumon Dhar (director); Bappy Chowdhury, Misha Shawdagar, Zahara Mitu	
APR	22	Local	Cleopatra Films	Saif Chandan (director); Ador Azad, Shobnom Bubly, Misha Sawdagor	
APR	22	Paap	Jaaz Multimedia	Saikat Nasir (director); Eamin Haque, Ziaul Roshan, Zakia Maha, Amaan Reza, Ariyana	
APR	22	Adam	T.H.R Media House	Abu Tauhid Heron (director); Yash Rohan, Jannatul Ferdous Oishee, Pran Roy, Milon Bhattacharyya, Rangan Riddo, Monira Akter Mithu, Sumona Shoma, Allen Shubhro, Shahiduzzaman Selim, Raisul Islam Asad	
APR	22	Prem Pritir Bandhan	Upoma Kothachitra	Solaiman Ali Lebu (director); Apu Biswas, Joy Chowdhury, Misha Sawdagor, Amaan Reza	
MAY		Moyurakkhi	Aaj International Limited	Rashid Polash (director); Sudip Biswas Deep, Bobby	
MAY	19	Ma	Arannye Pulok	Arannya Anwar (director); Pori Moni	
J U N E	2	Sultanpur	Jaaz Multimedia	Saikat Nasir (director), Sanj John, Adhora Khan	
J U N E	16	Fire Dekha	Rozina Films	Rozina (director); Ilias Kanchan, Rozina, Nirab, Orchita Sporshia	
J U N E	16	Fuljan	A2S Multimedia	Aminul Islam Bachchu (director); Misty Jannat, Sony Rahman, Riad Rayhan	
J U N E	22	Shakib Khan Lover	Jamil's Zoo	Written by Shamim Shikder, directed by Borno Nath and produced by Md. Jamil Hussain With Md. Jamil Hussain as Shakib Khan's fan, Alankar Chowdhury	
J U N E	29 (Eid-ul-Adha)	MR-9	Jaaz Multimedia	Asif Akbar (director); ABM Sumon, Anisur Rahman Milon, Omi Vaidya, Sakshi Pradhan, Frank Grillo, Michael Jai White, Matt Passmore, James Moses Black, Oleg Prudius, Ed Gage, Vincent E. McDaniel, Tamas Nadas, Luci Ti, Remy Grillo, Niko Foster, Yabetz Cohen Perez, Miguel Insignares, Priscilla Moy	
J U N E	29 (Eid-ul-Adha)	Priyotoma	Versatile Media	Himel Ashraf (director); Shakib Khan	
J U N E	29 (Eid-ul-Adha)	Surongo	Chorki & Alpha-i	Raihan Rafi (director); Afran Nisho, Toma Mirza	
J U N E	29 (Eid-ul-Adha)	Lal Shari	Apu–Joy Cholochitra	Bandhan Biswas (director); Apu Biswas, Symon Sadik, Sumit Sengupta, Dilruba Doyel	
J U N E	29 (Eid-ul-Adha)	Prohelika	Rangan Music	Chayanika Chowdhury (director); Mahfuz Ahmed, Shobnom Bubly	
J U N E	29 (Eid-ul-Adha)	Casino	Simplex International	Saikat Nasir (director); Nirab Hossain, Shobnom Bubly	

== July–September ==
Opening		Title	Production company	Cast and crew	Ref
A U G	11	Mike	Gourab71	F S Shahin & Hasan Zafrul Bipul (director); Ferdous Ahmed, Tanveen Sweety, Tariq Anam Khan	
A U G	18	Aam Kathaler Chhuti	Cinemaker	Mohammad Nuruzzaman (director), Leon Ahmed, Zubair, Arif, Halima, Tanzil, Fatima, Kamruzzaman Kamrul, Abdul Hamid	
S E P	8	Sujon Majhi	Semonty Music	Delwar Jahan Jhantu (director); Ferdous Ahmed, Nipun Akter, Kazi Hayat	
S E P	22	Antarjal	Motion People Studios	Dipankar Dipon (director); Siam Ahmed, Bidya Sinha Mim, ABM Sumon, Keto Bhai	

== October–December ==
Opening		Title	Director	Cast	Production house	Ref.
O C T	13	Mujib: The Making of a Nation	Shyam Benegal	Arifin Shuvoo; Nusrat Imrose Tisha	Bangladesh Film Development Corporation and National Film Development Corporation of India	
O C T	20	Iti Chittra	Raisul Islam Anik	Rakib Hossain Evon; Jannatul Ritu	Soongi Productions	
N O V	3	Ashomvob	Aruna Biswas	Gazi Abdun Noor; Sohana Saba; Aruna Biswas; Abul Hayat	Jatra Vision	
N O V	3	Megher Kapaat	Walid Ahmed	Rakib Hossain Evon; Sabrin Tonny	Shadamata Entertainment	
N O V	10	Jontrona	Arifur Jaman Arif	Ador Azad; Manoshi Prokrety; Saima Smriti	Smart Multimedia	

== See also ==
- List of Bangladeshi films of 2024
- List of Bangladeshi films of 2022
- List of Bangladeshi films of 2021
- List of Bangladeshi films of 2020
- List of Bangladeshi films
- Cinema of Bangladesh
