= List of Bangladeshi films of 2024 =

This is a list of Bangladeshi films that are scheduled to be released in 2024.

== Box office collection ==
The top ten list of highest-grossing Bangladeshi films released in 2024, by worldwide box office gross revenue, are as follows.

Highest-grossing films of 2024
Rank	Title	Production company / distributor	Worldwide gross	Ref
1	Toofan	Alpha-i Studios Limited	৳56.00 crore (US$4.6 million)	
2	Rajkumar	Versatile Media	৳26.00 crore (US$2.1 million)	
3	Dorod	Action Cut Entertainment, Eskay Movies, Kibria Films	৳9.00 crore (US$730,000)	
4	Deyaler Desh	Metro Cinema	৳2.0 crore (US$160,000)	
5	Omar	Master Communications	৳1.57 crore (US$130,000)	
6	Mona: Jinn-2	Jaaz Multimedia	৳1.4 crore (US$110,000)	

== January – March ==
Opening		Title	Director	Cast	Production company	Ref.
J A N	19	Shesh Bazi	Mehedi Hasan	Symon Sadik; Shirin Shila; Mahmudul Islam Mithu; Saberi Alam; Rashed Mamun Apu	Require Real Estate Ltd.	
J A N	19	Kagojer Bou	Chayanika Chowdhury	D.A. Tayeb; Mamnun Hasan Emon; Pori Moni	Polash Cineplex	
J A N	26	Rukhe Darao	Sukumar Chandra Dash	Kayes Arju; Akhi Chowdhury; Jibon; Tanha Tasnia; Kazi Hayat	Mohona Movies	
F E B	9	Peyarar Subash	Nurul Alam Atique	Ahmed Rubel; Tariq Anam Khan; Jaya Ahsan	Alpha-i Studios Ltd and Chorki	
F E B	9	Trap – The Untold Story	Din Islam	Joy Chowdhury; Mahmudul Islam Mithu; Apu Biswas; Don; Joy Raj	DN Bangla	
F E B	16	Chaya Brikkho	Bandhan Biswas	Nirab Hossain; Apu Biswas	Anupam Kathachitra	
F E B	16	Srabon Josnay	Abudus Samad Khokon	Gazi Abdun Noor; Prarthana Fardin Dighi	Event Plus	
F E B	23	Tal Matal	Habib Khan	Habib Khan; Kazi Hayat; Desh Islam; Sheuly Zaman	HN Media House	
M A R		_	_	_	_	

== April–June ==
Opening		Title	Director	Cast	Production company	Ref.
A P R	11	Rajkumar	Himel Ashraf	Shakib Khan; Courtney Coffey; Tariq Anam Khan	Versatile Media	
A P R	11	Omar	Mohammad Mostafa Kamal Raz	Sariful Razz; Fazlur Rahman Babu; Shahiduzzaman Selim; Nasir Uddin Khan	Master Communications	
A P R	11	Deyaler Desh	Mishuk Moni	Sariful Razz; Shobnom Bubly	Metro Cinema	
A P R	11	Maya: The Love	Jasim Uddin Jakir	Shobnom Bubly, Ziaul Roshan, Symon Sadik, Anisur Rahman Milon	Brother Films	
A P R	11	Lipstick	Kamruzzaman Roman	Ador Azad, Puja Cherry, Shahiduzzaman Selim, Misha Sawdagor	Cleopatra Films	
A P R	11	Meghna Konna	Fuad Chowdhury	Sazzad Hossain, Shemonty Shaumy, Quazi Nawshaba Ahmed	Anwar Azad Films, SJ Motion Pictures	
A P R	11	Mona: Jinn-2	Kamruzzaman Roman	Shuprovat, Tariq Anam Khan, Ahmed Rubel	Jaaz Multimedia	
A P R	11	Green Card	Kazi Hayat, Roushon Ara Nipa	Kazi Maruf, Nusrat Tisham, DJ Sohel	Film Factory INC	
A P R	11	Ahare Jibon	Chatku Ahmed	Ferdous Ahmed, Dilara Hanif Purnima, Joy Chowdhury	Kibria Films	
A P R	11	Shonar Chor	Zahid Hossain	Zayed Khan, Snigdha, Omar Sani, Moushumi, Shahiduzzaman Selim	Excell Film	
A P R	11	Kajolrekha	Giasuddin Selim	Sariful Razz; Mondira Chokroborty		
M A Y	3	Dead Body	Md. Iqbal	Omar Sani, Ziaul Roshan, Rashed Mamun Apu, Anwesha Roy Any	Sunan Movies	
M A Y	3	Shyama Kabya	Badrul Anam Saud	Neelanjona Neela; Shohel Mondol; Intekhab Dinar; Nowrin Hasan Khan Jenny	Heritage Films And Communications	
M A Y	10	Potu	Ahmed Humayun	Evan Sair; Afra Shaiar; Shoaib Monir; Dilruba Doyel	Jaaz Multimedia	
M A Y	24	Fatima	Dhrubo Hasan	Tasnia Farin; Yash Rohan; Pantho Kanai; Ayesha Monica	Outcaste Films	
M A Y	24	Sushagotom	Shafiqul Alam	Nirab Hossain Orchita Sporshia; Nipun Akter	Bonbithi Movies	
M A Y	24	Moynar Shesh Kotha	Babu Siddiqui	Sagor; Sanai Mahbub; Rasel Mia; Aruna Biswas; Sadek Bacchu; Bortha Mithu	Life Gold Media	
J U N	17	Toofan	Raihan Rafi	Shakib Khan; Mimi Chakraborty; Masuma Rahman Nabila	Chorki, Alpha-i Studios Ltd, SVF	
J U N	17	Revenge	Md. Iqbal	Ziaul Roshan, Shobnom Bubly	Sunan Movies	
J U N	17	Agontuk	Sumon Dhor	Shamol Mawla, Puja Cherry	The Abhi Kathachitra	
J U N	17	Dark World	Mostafizur Rahman Manik	Munna Khan, Koushani Mukherjee	Munna Khan Multimedia	
J U N	17	Mayarakshi	Roshid Polash	Bobby Haque, Sudip Kumar Dip	Aazz International Ltd	

== July–September ==
Opening		Title	Director	Cast	Production company	Ref.
J U L	12	Ajob Karkhana	Shabnam Ferdousi	Parambrata Chattopadhyay; Shabnaz Sadia Emi; Dilruba Doyel; Khaled Hasan Rumi	Versa Media	
A U G	23	Omanush Holo Manush	Montazur Rahman Akbar	Dipjol; Mou Khan; Joy Chowdhury	Omi Bani Kathachitra	
S E P						

== October–December ==
Opening		Title	Director	Cast	Production company	Ref.
O C T	4	Jimmi	Dipjol	Dipjol; Shirin Shila; Misha Sawdagor	Omi Bani Kathachitra	
O C T	11	Shoroter Joba	Kusum Sikder	Jeetu Ahsan; Kusum Sikder; Yash Rohan; Nidra Dey Neha; Shahidul Alam Sacchu	Impress Telefilm Limited & Pohordanga Pictures	
O C T	11	Badsha: The King	Evan Mallik	Hero Alom; Riya Moni; Kazi Hayat	Hero Alom Production	
O C T	18	Choritro	Deen Islam	Farhad Hussen; Kanta Noor; Mishti Maria; Borda Mithu	DN Bangla	
O C T	18	Hoimontir Etikatha	Mirza Sakhawat Hossain	Oishika Oishi; Saif Khan; Jhuna Chowdhury; Rasheda Chowdhury	Oishika Kothachitra	
N O V	8	36 24 36	Rezaur Rahman	Syed Zaman Shawon; Prarthana Fardin Dighi	Chorki & Chabial	
N O V	8	Rong Dhong	Ahasan Sarwar	Tariq Anam Khan; Lutfur Rahman George; Faruque Ahmed	Blacshaine Ltd. & Minute Films	
N O V	15	Dorod	Anonno Mamun	Shakib Khan; Sonal Chauhan; Payel Sarkar; Rahul Dev; Rajesh Sharma	Action Cut Entertainment; Eskay Movies; Kibria Films	
N O V	29	Voyal	Biplob Hayder	Irfan Sajjad; Aisha Khan; Lutfur Rahman George	CineCraft Creations	
D E C	6	Dunia	Saif Chandan	Anisur Rahman Milon; Nirab Hossain; Airin Sultana	Versatile Media	
D E C	6	Noya Manush	Sohel Rana Boyati	Rawnak Hasan; Moushumi Hamid; Ashish Khondker	G-Series	
D E C	13	Danger Zone	Belal Sani	Bappy Chowdhury Falguni Rahman Jolly; Sk Meherima	Time Media	
D E C	13	Hurmoti	Sabnam Parvin	Sabnam Parvin; Dilara Zaman; Sony Rahman	Silver Screen Production Pvt. Ltd.	
D E C	13	840: The Great Bangla Democracy Pvt. Ltd.	Mostofa Sarwar Farooki	Nasir Uddin Khan; Zakia Bari Momo; Fazlur Rahman Babu	Chabial	
D E C	20	Makorshar Jal	Akash Acharjee	Himadri Himu; Samiha Akter; Soma Kash; Bortha Mithu	S.P Pictures	
D E C	20	Priyo Maloti	Shankha Dasgupta	Mehazabien Chowdhury; Nader Chowdhury; Azad Abul Kalam; Somu Chowdhury	Filmy Features Productions, Frame Per Second, Chorki	
D E C	27	Nakshi Kanthar Jamin	Akram Khan	Jaya Ahsan; Fariha Shams Sheuti; Iresh Zaker	TM Films	

== See also ==
- List of Bangladeshi films of 2023
- List of Bangladeshi films of 2025
