= List of Bangladeshi films of 2019 =

This article lists feature-length films and full-length documentaries that were at least partly produced by the Bangladeshi film industry and were released in Bangladesh in 2019. Short films and made-for-TV films are not included. Films are ordered by domestic public release date, excluding film festivals, theatrical releases abroad, and sneak previews or screenings.

== Releases ==
=== January–March ===
Opening		Title	Director	Starring	Ref.
J A N	4	I am Raaz	M Azad	Raaz Ibrahim, Sabrina Mamia, Sadek Bachchu, Amir Siraji	
F E B R U A R Y	8	Amar Prem Amar Priya	Shamimul Islam Shamim	Kayes Arju, Pori Moni	
F E B R U A R Y	8	Daag Hridoye	Tarek Shikder	Bappy Chowdhury, Bidya Sinha Saha Mim, Achol	
F E B R U A R Y	15	Fagun Haway	Tauquir Ahmed	Nusrat Imrose Tisha, Siam Ahmed, Yashpal Sharma, Abul Hayat	
F E B R U A R Y	15	Ratrir Jatri	Habibul Islam Habib	Moushumi, Anisur Rahman Milon	
F E B R U A R Y	22	Hrodoyer Rangdhanu	Rajibul Hossain	Mina Petkovich, Muhtasin Sajal, Shams Kader	
F E B R U A R Y	22	Ondhokar Jogot	Badiul Alam Khokon	DA Tayeb, Mahiya Mahi	
F E B R U A R Y	22	Prem Amar 2	Bidula Bhattacharya	Puja Cherry, Adrit Roy, Sourav Das, Champa, Nader Chowdhury	
M A R C H	8	Jodi Ekdin	Mohammad Mostafa Kamal Raz	Tahsan, Srabanti, Taskeen Rahman, Afrin Shikha Raisa	
M A R C H	15	Bou Bazar	Mukul Netrabadi	Shahriaz, Raaha Tanha Khan, Rehana Jolly	
M A R C H	22	Karon Tomay Bhalobashi	Golam Mostafa Shimul	Sabbir Ahmed, Bithi Rani Sarker, Najifa Chowdhury	
M A R C H	29	Live From Dhaka	Abdullah Mohammad Saad	Mostafa Monowar, Tasnuva Tamanna	

=== April–June ===
Opening		Title	Director	Starring	Ref.
A P R	5	Protishoder Agun	Mohammad Aslam	Zayed Khan, Mou Khan, Shahriaz, Naaz, Danny Sidak	
A P R	12	Boyfriend	Uttam Akash	Taskeen Rahman, Semanti Shoumi, Amit Hasan	
A P R	26	Alpha	Nasiruddin Yousuff	ATM Shamsuzzaman, Alamgir Kabir, Doel	
J U N E	5	Abar Boshonto	Ananya Mamun	Tariq Anam Khan, Orchita Sporshia	
J U N E	5	Aloy Vubon Bora	Amirul Islam	Saif Khan, Mishti Maria, Aruna Biswas, Shahidul Alam Sachchu	
J U N E	5	The Director	Kamruzzaman Kamu	Mosharraf Karim, Popy, Marzuk Russell	
J U N E	5	Nolok	Sakib Sonet and his team	Shakib Khan, Bobby	
J U N E	5	Password	Malek Afsary	Shakib Khan, Shabnom Bubly, Emon, Misha Sawdagor	
J U N E	7	Bhalobashar Uttap	Shahidul Alam Sachchu	Emon, Mishti Maria, Aruna Biswas, Abdullah Rana	

=== July–September ===
Opening		Title	Director	Starring	Ref.
J U L Y	19	Anuprobesh	Taposh Kumar Datta	Anwar Sayem, Danjida Islam, Pijush Bandyopadhyay	
J U L Y	26	Kalo Megher Vela	Mrittika Gun	Arun, Runa Khan, Sumon Biswas	
J U L Y	26	Goendagiri	Nasim Sahnic	Kalyan Corraya, Tania Bristy, Shampa Hasnain	
A U G U S T	2	Akash Mahal	Delwar Jahan Jhantu	Emon, Airin, Danny Sidak	
A U G U S T	9	Bhalobashar Rajkonna	Raju Alim	Moushumi Hamid, Shipan Mitra, Abid Rehan	
A U G U S T	11	Beporowa	Raja Chanda	Ziaul Roshan, Eamin Haque Bobby	
A U G U S T	12	Bhalobashar Jala	Boshir Ahmed	Shakil Khan, Arpa, Shabnam Parveen, Afzal Sharif	
A U G U S T	12	Moner Moto Manush Pailam Na	Jakir Hossain Raju	Shakib Khan, Shabnom Bubly	
A U G U S T	30	Bhalobasha.com	Mohammad Aslam	Avi, Nijhum Rubina, Raha	
S E P	13	Obotar	Mahmud Hasan Shikder	Mahiya Mahi, JH Rusho, Amin Khan, Misha Sawdagor	
S E P	13	Mayaboti	Arun Chowdhury	Nusrat Imrose Tisha, Yash Rohan	
S E P	20	Paglami	Komol Sarker	Bappy Chowdhury, Shrabani Roy	
S E P	27	Shapludu	Golam Sohrab Dodul	Arifin Shuvo, Mim, Zahid Hasan, Tariq Anam Khan, Shatabdi Wadud	

=== October–December ===
Opening		Title	Director	Starring	Ref.
O C T	18	Dongiri	Shah Alam Mondol	Bappy Chowdhury, Amiya Amei, Anisur Rahman Milon	
N O V E M B E R	1	Padmar Prem	Harunuzzaman	Airin Sultana, Sumit Sengupta, Sadek Bacchu, Jayanta Chattopadhyay	
N O V E M B E R	8	Begum Jaan	Mohammad Aslam	Emon, Shirin Shila, Aurin	
N O V E M B E R	15	Sincerely, Your Dhaka	Abdullah Al Nur, Golam Kibria Farooki, Tanim Noor, Krishnendu Chattopadhyay, Mahmdul Islam, Robiul Alam, Mir Mukarram Hossain, Nuhash Humayun, Rahat Rahman, Syed Ahmed Shawki, Syed Saleh Ahmed Subhan and Tanvir Ahsan	Nusrat Imrose Tisha, Shatabdi Wadud, Intekhab Dinar, Iresh Zaker, Orchita Sporshia, Manoj Pramanik, Mostafa Monowar, Allen Shuvro, Shahtaj Monira Hashem, Rawnak Hasan	
N O V E M B E R	29	No Dorai	Taneem Rahman Angshu	Sariful Razz, Sunerah Binte Kamal, Sayed Babu	
N O V E M B E R	29	Indubala	Joy Sarkar	Anisur Rahman Milon, Payel, Fazlur Rahman Babu	
D E C E M B E R	6	Prem Chor	Uttam Akash	Shanto Khan, Neha Amandeep	
D E C E M B E R	13	Garments Sromik Zindabad	Mustafizur Rahman Babu	Kazi Maruf, Aurin, Rubel, Amit Hasan	
D E C E M B E R	20	Farayezi Andolan 1842	Dayel Rahman	Amin Khan, Nawsheen	
D E C E M B E R	20	Gohiner Gaan	Sadat Hossain	Asif Akbar, Toma Mirza, Tanzika Amin, Syed Hasan Imam	
D E C E M B E R	27	Maya: The Lost Mother	Masud Pathik	Mumtaz Sorcar, Jyotika Jyoti, Pran Roy	

== See also ==
- 2019 in Bangladesh
