= Tungiparar Miya Bhai =

Bengali film based on life of Bangabandhu released in 2021

- Official poster
- Bengali: টুঙ্গিপাড়ার মিয়া ভাই
- Directed by: Selim Khan; Shamim Ahamed Roni
- Written by: Shamim Ahamed Roni
- Screenplay by: Shamim Ahamed Roni
- Produced by: Pinki Akter
- Starring: Shanto Khan; Prarthana Fardin Dighi; Jayanta Chattopadhyay; Dilara Zaman; Shiba Shanu
- Cinematography: Saiful Islam Shahin
- Edited by: Touhid Hossain Chowdhury
- Music by: Emon Saha
- Production company: Story Splash Media
- Distributed by: Shapla Media
- Release dates: March 30, 2021 (Premier); April 2, 2021 (Bangladesh)
- Running time: 128 Minutes
- Country: Bangladesh
- Language: Bengali
- Budget: ৳83 lakh (US$68,000)

Tungiparar Miya Bhai is a 2021 Bangladeshi biographical feature film. Its director is Selim Khan and producer is Pinky Akter. The film was made under the banner of Story Shapla Media.

It was written and co-directed by Shamim Ahamed Roni. The film is based on the early events of the life of First President of Bangladesh Sheikh Mujibur Rahman. The two main characters in this film are Bangabandhu and his wife Fazilatunnesa Mujib Renu, played by Shanto Khan and Prarthana Fardin Dighi.

The film was shot in August and September 2020 inside Bangladesh Film Development Corporation (BFDC), Dhaka University and various places in Chandpur. Due to its historical context, the Bangladesh Film Censor Board was very careful in granting clearance for the film. After obtaining the final clearance for release, the film premiered on March 30, 2021 and later on April 2, it was released in 54 screens across Bangladesh. The Ministry of Education of Bangladesh also directed that the film be shown in all schools and colleges. It won awards in two categories at a film festival. it was final film of Shanto Khan.

== Storyline ==
"Tungiparar Miya Bhai" depicts various notable events of the earlier life of the first President of Bangladesh Sheikh Mujibur Rahman from 1930 to 1952 during his lifetime. His educational life in film, developing his leadership qualities while attending missionary school in 1939; Marriage to Begum Fazilatunnesa in 1934, 9 years of marriage beginning in 1942, political activism in British India during her student life and later her political relations with Pakistan Movement, Hussain Shaheed Suhrawardy, Sher-e-Bangla A. K. Fazlul Huq and Abdul Hamid Khan Bhasani; His political role in the Calcutta riots during the partition of United Bengal; Arrests, imprisonment and release have been predominant for various reasons.

== Cast ==
In addition to the main characters in the film Tungiparar Miya Bhai, regular actors from theater have played various supporting roles. List of main characters in the film -

- Shanto Khan as Sheikh Mujibur Rahman
  - Akibul Islam Raiyan as Sheikh Mujibur Rahman at 17 years old
  - Rahat Alam as Sheikh Mujibur Rahman at 10 years old
- Prarthana Fardin Dighi as Sheikh Fazilatunnesa Mujib
- Shiba Shanu as A. K. Fazlul Huq
- Jayanta Chattopadhyay as Sheikh Lutfar Rahman
- Maznun Mizan as Huseyn Shaheed Suhrawardy
- Kazi Mizanur Rahman as Abdul Hamid Khan Bhashani
- Ziaul Hasan Kislu as Vice Chancellor of the University
- Khorshed Alam Khosru as Tofazzal Hossain Manik Miah
- Dilara Zaman as Sayera Khatun
- Shahed Ali - Shamsul Huq
- Naznin Hasan Chumki as Anwara Khatun
- Subrata as Hamid Master
- Sumon Parvez as Khondaker Mostaq Ahmad
- Rimu Roza Khandakar as Fatima
- Abdul Karim as Maulavi Abdul Hakim
- Mrinmoyi as Sheikh Hasina
- Sajib as Sheikh Kamal
- Rahat Alam as Noni Kumar
- Kamrul Islam as Moktar Saheb
- Saju Mehedi as Roma Pod Dutta
- Provat Mandal as Malek
- Promiti Proma Aisu as Aasiya
- D.H Chunnu as Ekramul Haque
- Sultan Mahmud Tanzu as Football referee
- Mukul Siraj as Ataur Rahman
- Atique Rahman as Syed Nazrul Islam
- Rajib Salehin as Tajuddin Ahmad
- Saud Chowdhury as Abdul Kuddas Makhan
- Shahzada Samrat as Nurun Alam
- Mamun Chowdhury Ripon as Nuruddin
- Pankaj Majumdar as Hashim Saheb
- Pavel Islam as Anwar Hosen
- Muhammad Azam Khan as Nurul Huda
- Ashraful Ashish as Oli Ahad
- Amin Azad as Muktar
- Rigan Sohan Ratna as M.A Maudud
- Sharif Hosen Emon as Naimuddin
- Roshan Sharif as Toyaha
- Abid Hasan Nirjhor as Rayhan
- Anisul Haque Barun as Kamruddin
- Dipak Suman as Shawkat
- Fabian Collings as Mahiuddin
- Iqbal Babu as Mohammadullah
- Mizanur Rahman as Butler
- SK Shamim as Robber
- Sabbir Ahmed as Jahiruddin

Also Harunur Rashid and Shariful Islam Sharif in the role of Guard, Sohail Uddin and Sultan Ahmed in the role of other policemen, Govinda Mandal and Rajib Das in the role of various officers, Syed Mosharraf in the role of employee, Tajuddin Taju and Swarna Akhter in the role of students, Chowdhury, Mitul Khan, Chamak Khan, Sweden Aslam and Rakib Hasan e acted.

== Production ==
The pre-production of the film started just after the making of August 1975, a political thriller made by the same director duo about the assassination of Sheikh Mujibur Rahman. Prior to the commencement of the main filming, the actors underwent six months of research on Sheikh Mujib and two months of practice for the actual implementation of the characters. Most of the films were shot in the premises of BFDC, Chandpur, Dhaka University. The principal photography was completed in 32 days, from 19 August 2020 to 24 September. This is the first biopic about Sheikh Mujibur Rahman. The music of the film is composed and directed by Emon Saha. Only one song has been used in the film; The song composed by Sudip Kumar Dwip is sung by Bappa Mazumder. The film was made at a cost of BDT 83 lakh. After the story was created under the banner of Splash Media, Shapla Media took the distributor rights.

== Release ==
=== Censorship and marketing ===
The Bangladesh Film Censor Board verifies the historical accuracy of allowing the screening of the film. On March 14, 2021, the censor board's clearance was granted, but permission for re-examination was suspended. Subject to revision, it got its final clearance on March 23. Shapla Media released the official poster of the film on October 26, 2020. Before getting the censor clearance, Shapla Media campaigned for its release on March 12, 2021.

=== Release ===
The release date of Tungiparar Miya Bhai has been announced several times. The film was originally slated for release on December 25, 2020. The release date was later fixed for March 12, 2021 and Independence Day. The film was premiered on March 30, 2021 at the Shilpakala Academy, after that the film was commercially released on April 2 in 54 cinemas across Bangladesh. In addition to the theaters, the film is released on the video on demand service named "Cinebuzz".

Apart from being released through entertainment, the film was directed by the Ministry of Education of Bangladesh to be screened in all schools and colleges as it was biopic of Sheikh Mujibur Rahman. The exhibition was held on 7 August 2021 at the Bangladesh High Commission in New Delhi. It was broadcast in all television channel of Bangladesh on March 17, 2022.

== Reception ==
Shanto Khan and Jayanta Chattopadhyay won the Best Actor award at the Second Cinemaking International Film Festival.

=== Accolades ===
List of awards and nominations
Organization	Year	Date	Category	Recipient	Result	Source
2nd Cinemaking International Film Festival	2022	6 January 2022	Best Actor	Shanto Khan	Won	
2nd Cinemaking International Film Festival	2022	6 January 2022	Best Actor (Character)	Jayanta Chattopadhyay	Won	
