= List of Bangladeshi films of 2020 =

This is a list of Bangladeshi films that were scheduled to release in 2020.

== Box office collection ==
The highest-grossing Bangladeshi films released in 2020, by worldwide box office gross revenue, are as follows.

*	Denotes films still running in cinemas worldwide

Highest worldwide gross of 2020
Rank	Title	Production company	Distributor	Worldwide gross	Ref.
1	Bir	SK Films	SK Films & Sunan Films	৳30,800,000	
2	Shahenshah	Shapla Media; Unlimited Audio Video	Shapla Media	৳29,000,000	
3	Gondi	Gorai Films	TOT Films	৳55,00,000	

== Released ==
=== January – May ===
Opening		Title	Cast and crew	Ref(s)
J A N	10	Joynagar Er Jomidar	M Shakhawat Hossain (director), Abu Sayeed Khan, Farzana Chobi, Kaniz Lia	
J A N	17	Kathbirali	Niamul Mukta (director); Orchita Sporshia, Asaduzzaman Abir, Shahriar Ferdous Sajeeb	
J A N	17	The Unparalleled	Ashraf Shishir (director), Sajid Ahmad, Abdur Rahman Rajib	
F E B	7	Gondi	Fakhrul Abedin (director), Suborna Mustafa, Sabyasachi Chakrabarty, Aparna Ghosh	
F E B	14	Bir	Kazi Hayat (director), Shakib Khan, Shabnom Bubly, Misha Sawdagor	
M A R	6	Shahenshah	Shamim Ahamed Roni (director), Shakib Khan, Nusraat Faria Mazhar	
M A R	6	Chol Jai	Masuma Rahman Tani (director), Lucy Tripti Gomes, Anisur Rahman Milon	

=== October - December ===
Opening		Title	Cast and crew	Ref(s)
O C T	23	Unoponchash Batash	Masud Hasan Ujjal (director), Sharlin Farzana, Imtiaz Barshon, Manosh Bondopadhay, Elora Gohor	
N O V	20	Biography of Nazrul	Ferdous Khan (director), Asaduzzaman Noor, Progya Laboni	
D E C	11	Bishwoshundori	Chayanika Chowdhury (director), Siam Ahmed, Pori Moni, Champa (actress), Fazlur Rahman Babu, Alamgir (actor)	
D E C	11	Rupsha Nodir Banke	Tanvir Mokammel (director), Jahid Hasan Shovon, Khairul Alam Sabuj, Ramendu Majumdar, Chitralekha Guho	
D E C	16	Nabab LLB	Anonno Mamun (director), Shakib Khan, Mahiya Mahi, Orchita Sporshia, Shahiduzzaman Selim	
D E C	25	The Grave	Gazi Rakayet (director), Gazi Rakayet, Dilara Zaman, Moushumi Hamid, Sushoma Sarkar	

== See also ==
- List of Bangladeshi films of 2019
- List of Bangladeshi films
- Cinema of Bangladesh
