= Don (actor) =

Bangladeshi film actor

- Born: Mohammad Ashraful Haque; 7 August 1971 (age 55); Katnapara, Bogra, Rajshahi
- Occupation: actor
- Years active: 1993–present
- Notable work: Keyamot Theke Keyamot (1993); Swatta (2017)

Mohammad Ashraful Haque (better known by the stage name Don, birth: 7 August 1971) is a Bangladeshi film actor. He usually plays supporting characters as an antagonist. He made his on-screen debut in the film Love (1991) directed by Sohanur Rahman Sohan, but his first release was Keyamot Theke Keyamot in 1993, which was also directed by Sohanur Rahman Sohan. Don has acted in more than 650 films in his career of more than two decades. In 2023, he performed in Priyotoma, which is the highest grossing Bangladesh film of all-time. in 2026, he was arrested for his co-star Salman Shah case.

== Early life ==
Don was born on 7 August 1971 as Mohammad Ashraful Haque to Mohammad Nazmul Haque and Mosammat Moazzama Haque in Katnapara, Bogra. His father is deceased, but his mother is currently living in the United States. Don is the youngest of ten siblings.

== Career ==
After leaving Bogra city and coming to Dhaka, he auditioned in a search for new faces at BFDC in 1991, but failed. When he met director Sohanur Rahman Sohan, he gave him a chance in a film for the first time. Don made his on-screen debut in Sohanur Rahman Sohan's Love. But his first release was Sohan's another project Keyamot Theke Keyamot in 1993, which was also the debut of popular actors Salman Shah and Moushumi. He got to know the late actor Salman Shah by acting in the film Keyamot Theke Keyamot. His list of hit films includes E Jibon Tomar Amar, Bikkhov, Valobasa Mullo Koto, Tomake Chai, Phuler Moto Bou, Biyer Phul, Jibon Songsar, Valobasa Kare Koy, Moha Milon, Milon Hobe Koto Din, and Matir Phul. He has acted in more than 650 films in his career of more than two decades. Apart from films, he has also acted in several television dramas. He also played a hero opposite actress Jona in the telefilm Koto Bhalobashi Tomake directed by Kaushik Hossain Taposh. Don also produced a film titled Ek Janomer Valabasha. In 2023, he performed as an antagonist in Himel Ashraf's tragic romance Priyotoma, co-starring Shakib Khan, which became the highest grossing Bangladeshi film of all-time.

Along with acting, Don also formed a band group named Archive. He has been involved in various social activities. From 2015 to 2016, he also served as the international affairs editor of the Bangladesh Film Artists Association.

== Filmography ==
=== As actor ===
Key
†	Denotes films that have not yet been released

Year	Films	Roles	Directors	Notes	Ref.
1991	Love	Sharif	Sohanur Rahman Sohan	On-screen debut	
1993	Keyamot Theke Keyamot	Selim	Sohanur Rahman Sohan	Debut film	
1994	Premjuddho	Gulzar	Jibon Rahman		
1994	Tumi Amar		Jahirul Haque and Tamijuddin Rijvi		
2006	Chachchu	Fulu Mirza	FI Manik		
2011	Koti Takar Prem		Sohanur Rahman Sohan		
2012	Ek Mon Ek Pran		Sohanur Rahman Sohan		
2014	Ami Shudhu Cheyechi Tomay		Ashok Pati, Anonno Mamun	Indo-Bangladesh joint production	
2015	Blackmail	Kana Babu	Anonno Mamun		
2015	Valobashar Golpo		Anonno Mamun		
2015	The Story of Samara		Rikiya Masudo		
2016	Rudra The Gangster		Sayem Zafar Imami		
2016	Ostitto				
2016	Ami Tomar Hote Chai		Anonno Mamun		
2017	Swatta		Hashibur Reza Kallol		
2018	Pagol Manush		M. M. Sarker		
2018	Captain Khan	Tony	Wajed Ali Sumon		
2019	Password		Malek Afsari		
2019	Moner Moto Manush Pailam Na		Jakir Hossain Raju		
2019	Valobasha Dot Com		Mohammad Aslam		
2019	Amar Prem Amar Priya		Shamimul Islam Shamim		
2019	Abbas	Jabbar Joaddar	Saif Chandan		
2020	Shahenshah		Shamim Ahamed Roni		
2020	Hridoy Jore		Rafiq Sikder		
2022	Chit Mohol	Sarker	HR Habib		
2022	Shaan		M Rahim		
2023	Lal Shari	Bodi	Bandhan Biswas		
2023	Priyotoma	Ranga	Himel Ashraf		
2023	Jontrona		Arifur Jaman Arif		
2024	Trap – The Untold Story		Din Islam		
2024	Chhaya Brikkho		Bandhan Biswas		
2025	Insaaf	Kana Rashid	Sanjoy Somaddar		

=== Music video ===
Year	Title	Singer	Music	Co-casting	Ref.
2022	"O Babu Re"	Muna	Jahid Bashar Pankaj	Priya Onanna & Muna	
