= Password (2019 Bangladeshi film) =

2019 Bangladeshi film directed by Malek Afsari

- Theatrical release poster
- Directed by: Malek Afsary
- Story by: Fred Cavayé; Guillaume Lemans
- Produced by: Shakib Khan; Mohammad Iqbal
- Starring: Shakib Khan; Shabnom Bubly; Mamnun Hasan Emon; Misha Sawdagor
- Cinematography: Saiful Shaheen
- Edited by: Touhid Hossain Chowdhury
- Music by: Emon Saha
- Production company: SK Films
- Distributed by: SK Films
- Release date: 5 June 2019
- Running time: 137 minutes
- Country: Bangladesh
- Language: Bengali
- Budget: ৳2.5 crore (equivalent to ৳3.6 crore or US$300,000 in 2024)
- Box office: ৳11 crore (equivalent to ৳16 crore or US$1.3 million in 2024)

Password is a 2019 Bangladeshi action-thriller film directed by Malek Afsary. The film is produced by Shakib Khan and Mohammad Iqbal, under the banner of SK Films. It features Shakib Khan as Rudra, who, through his autistic younger brother Rusho, played by Emon, comes into possession of the password to a Swiss bank account. Misha Sawdagor stars as Victor, a gangster trying to steal the password. Shabnom Bubly features as Rudra's love interest, Dr. Shabnom. The movie is loosely based on the 2010 French movie Point Blank.

Principal photography began on 1 March 2019, and wrapped up in May. The film was released in Bangladesh on June 5, 2019. The film's soundtrack is composed by Savvy Gupta, Akassh Sen and Lincon Roy Chowdhury and the score is composed by Emon Saha. It was the second production by Shakib Khan, before that he produced Hero: The Superstar which was released in 2014. The film won awards in five categories, including the popular film and popular actor award, at the Bharat-Bangladesh Film Festival. It is the highest-grossing film of 2019 and also one of the highest-grossing films of All-time.

== Plot ==
Alauddin Sarkar (Shiba Shanu) is a billionaire whose Swiss bank deposits thousands of crores. The bank account password is hidden in the bracelet's pen drive by Alauddin. Victor (Misha Sawdagor) became desperate to get the password for that Swiss bank account of Alauddin, who is the mafia don of the Underworld. One day when Alauddin comes to the gym, Victor's gangsters plot to take a pen drive from him, and in the incident cycle, the pen drive came to Rusho (Mamnun Hasan Emon), who is an autistic patient. When the pen drive caught the attention of his elder brother Rudra (Shakib Khan), he went to Alauddin's office to return it, and saw who had stabbed Alauddin. Before Aladdin died, his personal password in his Swiss bank account was told to Rudra, and said that the money should be deposited in the Rehabilitation Fund of Bangladesh, and for this money Victor wants to kill him. The Special Branch Officer of Police AC Kabir Khan (Amit Hasan) was on the scene to find the clue of Alauddin's death. DCDV officer of the Police disguised as Victor looking for a pen drive at the scene, but he couldn't find the pendrive anywhere.

As a result, Victor suspects doctor Shabnam (Rudra's physician) (Shabnom Bubly), Rudra and Rusho, who may have a pen drive.

== Cast ==
- Shakib Khan as Rudra, before Alauddin died, he gave him a Swiss bank account password, to deposit the bank's money to the rehabilitation fund of Bangladesh
- Shabnom Bubly as Dr. Shabnom, a medical doctor; Rudra's love interest
- Emon as Rusho, an autistic patient; Rudra's youngest brother
- Misha Sawdagor as Victor Daniel, an underworld don, who became desperate to find the password to Alauddin Sarker's Swiss bank account
- Shiba Shanu as Alauddin Sarker, a billionaire, original owner of Swiss bank account
- Amit Hasan as Kabir Khan, an Assistant Commissioner of Police (ACP), He led the investigation into the Alauddin Sarker murder case
- Tonami Haque as Shanta, an obstetrician; doctor Shabnam eldest sister, Rusho kidnapped her to save his brother Rudra from hospital police
- Don as Kaiser, Victor's friend and helper
- Sanko Panja as Mizan, who later demanded Victor for a share of Alauddin's Swiss bank money
- Nader Khan as Riaz Uddin, a landlord of Rudra and Rusho's home
- Rani Ahad as Suraiya, landlord Riaz Uddin's daughter
- Kamol Patekar as himself, a police officer
- Shaban Mahmood as himself (special appearance)
- Jhinuk (child artist)
- Sunan (child artist)

== Production ==
After the produce of Hero: The Superstar in 2014, Password is the second film produced by Shakib Khan.

On 1 March 2019, Muhurat of the film was held in Dhaka. Then, on the same day, the official principal photography of the film began at the Piyanka Shooting Spot in Dhaka. Bubly, Emon and other artists are participated in the shooting on the first day of filming. Later, on March 5, 2019, Shakib Khan attended in shooting. On the same day at 7am Shakib Khan and Shabnom Bubly participated in shooting at the floor of BFDC. The next day, they were shooting for 24 hours until 10am on March 6, 2019, the entire unit of the film was accompanied.

A song titled Eid Mubarak was filming on the 2nd floor of the BFDC, and the film's three songs are filmed in several locations, including Istanbul, the capital of Turkey, Anatolia, Cappadocia, Pamukkale.

=== Casting ===
Shakib Khan and Mamun Hasan Emon starred together in Password almost 3 years after the film Purno Doirgho Prem Kahini 2 directed by Shafi Uddin Shafi in 2016. Earlier, on February 28, 2019, Mamnun Hasan Emon has contracted sign for the film to play the role as Shakib Khan's younger brother Rudra.

== Soundtrack ==
Password

Soundtrack album by Lincon, Akassh, Savvy
- Released: 2019
- Recorded: 2018
- Studio: SK Films
- Genre: Feature film soundtrack
- Length: 15:00
- Label: SK Films
- Producer: Shakib Khan

Singles from Password
- 1. "Pagol Mon (পাগল মন)" Released: 29 May 2019; 2. "Eid Mubarak (ঈদ মোবারক)" Released: 1 June 2019; 3. "Agun Lagailo (আগুন লাগাইলো)" Released: 3 June 2019; 4. "SWAG" Released: 4 June 2019

Lincon chronology
Mon Jaane Na (2019)	Password (2019)

Akassh chronology
Prothom Love (2019)	Password (2019)	BIR (2020)

Savvy chronology
Shahenshah (2019)	Password (2019)	Bhokatta (2019)

The film soundtrack is composed by Lincon Roy Chowdhury, Akassh Sen, and Savvy Gupta. The first song of the film titled "Pagol Mon" is recreated from the song of the same title written and composed by Abdur Rahman Boyati. The song's other lyrics were written and composed by Lincon. The song is sung by Ashok Singh, which was also made his film debut. It was released on YouTube on May 29, 2019. The second song of film titled is "Eid Mubarak" was released on June 1, 2019, sung by Indian singer Akassh. The song has been composed and music arranged by Akash himself and lyrics written by Indian Priyo Chattopadhyay. Then, the third song of the film titled "Agun Lagailo" released on June 3, 2019. The song sung by Konal and Lincon and written and composed by Lincon himself. The fourth and last song was released on June 4, 2019. The song titled is "Swag" sung by Imran Mahmudul, composed and music arranged by Savvy Gupta and written by Priyo Chattopadhyay. All the songs from the film were released on SK Films' YouTube channel.

Track listing

No.	Title	Lyrics	Music	Singer(s)	Length
1.	"Pagol Mon (পাগল মন)" (The song is recreated from Abdur Rahman Boyati's original "Pagol Mon")	Lincon	Lincon	Ashok Singh	4:33
2.	"Eid Mubarak (ঈদ মোবারক)"	Priyo Chattopadhyay	Akassh	Akassh	3:02
3.	"Agun Lagailo (আগুন লাগাইলো)"	Lincon	Lincon	Konal & Lincon	3:48
4.	"Swag"	Priyo Chattopadhyay	Savvy	Imran	3:37
Total length:					15:00

== Marketing and release ==
On May 11, 2019, The 3D first look poster of the film was revealed on the official Facebook page of Shakib Khan, producer and actor of the film. On May 26, 2019, the film got an uncut certificate from the Bangladesh Film Censor Board. Following that on May 28, The film's official trailer was released on the official YouTube channel of SK Films, the production company of Shakib Khan.

=== Promotion ===
Shakib Khan, Misha Sawdagor and Mamun Hasan Emon were present as guests on a talk show titled 'Ajker Bangladesh' on Independent Television as part of the film's promotion on June 3, 2019. On June 4, Shakib Khan, Mamun Hasan Emon and Misha Sawdagor were also present as guests at another event on Channel I's 'Two the Point' as part of the film's promotion.

=== Release ===
The film was released in 177 theatres in Bangladesh on June 5, 2019.

== Reception ==
=== Box office ===
Password got huge response from the audience. The film grossed ৳11 crore (equivalent to ৳16 crore or US$1.3 million in 2024) on its fourth day at the box office, which is the fourth-highest grossing in the history of Bangladeshi cinema. The film most successful film of the year in 2019.

=== Awards and nominations ===
Awards	Date	Category	Nominee	Result
India-Bangladesh Film Award	21 October 2019	Best Popular Film	Password	Won
India-Bangladesh Film Award	21 October 2019	Best Popular Actor	Shakib Khan	Won
India-Bangladesh Film Award	21 October 2019	Best actor in Supporting role	Mamnun Hasan Emon	Won
India-Bangladesh Film Award	21 October 2019	Best Playback Singer	Imran Mahmudul	Won
India-Bangladesh Film Award	21 October 2019	Best Editor	Touhid Hossain Chowdhury	Won

== Controversy ==
On May 27, 2019, the film lead actor and producer Shakib Khan claimed a doctorate in film at the founding anniversary of a fashion house called Prem's Collection as the part of promotion of the film Password and said he can make international quality films in the Sundarbans as well. The video of his remarks spread on social media, sparking widespread discussion and criticism. Many criticized him and made various humorous comments, statuses and videos. Khan said about his comments, Many have did not understand of my comments, the way I actually wanted to explain. I mean, while I love making films, I also have a lot of experience. In that sense I have called myself a doctorate. Despite thousands of adversities, I am ready to make films. I meant it.

On the other hand, the director of the film Malek Afsari said about Khan's statements that, The Sundarbans is a jungle, there are no five star hotels. As long as I stay, I have to trouble. This is what he meant that, even if leave me in the Sundarbans, I can make international quality films.

He claimed that it was a basic story film before its release. The audiences complainted that it was a remake of the 2015 Telugu language film Dynamite which itself was a remake of 2014 Tamil Language film Arima Nambi after watching the trailer of the film. However, director of the film Malek Afsari, denied it and announced a reward of ৳1 million if the film could prove to be a copy of an Indian or Tamil language film.

After the film's release the audiences complained that the film script and story similar with the 2014 South Korean film The Target which itself was remake of 2010 French film Point Blank. Later, the film's co-producer Mohammad Iqbal indirectly acknowledged the copy story in a video message. The film director Malek Afsari, said on social media that he did not know that the story of the film was copy. However, later, he deleted that status. Then he made four arguments in favor of the originality of the film on social media.

On June 17, 2019, a film personality named Anand Kutum filed a complaint against the film with the Censor Board alleging forgery of the story. After reviewing the film the censor board members find some similarities in this film with some scenes from The Target and warned the producer and director not to match any other film in the future and again the film was cleared by the censors.

Besides that, music director Shawkat Ali Emon has accused to copying tune against the film's song Agun Lagailo. He complained that the tune of the song was similar with his composed song Chandra Tara which was released on March 18, 2019. In this regard, Malek Afsari said, "Now Password is successful. So many people will talk negatively about it. Everyone will want to share its success." He added, "I have heard the song too. It has similarities with the melody of Shawkat Ali Emon's song. The person who composed the tune of this song will be able to answer why he did it." Then, the song's composer Lincoln came live on social media and stated that he composed the song in 2017. and show the audio file of a song from the audio files stored on his mobile phone. There he showed that the audio file had been saved in 2017 on his mobile phone. However, many are reluctant to accept his argument as an irrefutable argument. Because, in this age of information technology, it is not impossible to change the date of saving a file stored on a mobile phone.

=== 2020: Song rights issue ===
On June 29, 2020 Dilruba Khan, the original vocalist of song "Pagol Mon" field a general diary (GD) against lead actor and producer of the film Shakib Khan and mobile phone service provider Robi Axiata Limited for allegedly violating copyright and digital security laws for using the first two lines of song "Pagol Mon" in the film without any official permission. Earlier on June 28, Dilruba Khan had lodged a written complaint against Khan in the Cyber Crime Unit of Dhaka Metropolitan Police (DMP) demanding ৳100 million in compensation.

== Home video ==
The film was revealed on Robi TV Plus on October 23, 2019. The television channel Channel i buy television rights to premier on television. Followed by its, the film's world television premier aired on Channel i on the occasion of Valentine's Day on February 14, 2020. The film also revealed on online streaming platform Bongo BD on the occasion on Eid-ul-Fitr in 2020.
