= Shesh Bazi =

- Poster of the film
- Directed by: Mehedi Hasan
- Written by: Parbez Sumon
- Produced by: Syed Mohammad Sohel
- Starring: Symon Sadik; Shirin Shila; Rashed Mamun Apu; Mahamudul Hasan Mithu; Saberi Alam
- Cinematography: Moshiur Rahman
- Edited by: Touhid Hossain Chowdhury
- Music by: Emon Saha; Shahriar Rafat; Avijit Jitu
- Production company: Require Real Estate Limited
- Distributed by: BD Filmbuzz
- Release date: January 19, 2024
- Country: Bangladesh
- Language: Bangla

Shesh Bazi (transl. Final Bet) is a 2024 Bangladeshi crime thriller film directed by Mehdi Hasan and produced by Syed Mohammad Sohel under the banner of Require Real Estate Limited. The film's story revolves around the impact of gambling on people's lives, starring Symon Sadik, Shirin Shila, Mahamudul Hasan Mithu, Saberi Alam and Rashed Mamun Apu played in the lead roles. Symon Sadik was nominated for Meril-Prothom Alo Award for Best Film Actor for his role in this film.

== Cast ==
- Symon Sadik as Shahed
- Shirin Shila
- Mahamudul Hasan Mithu as Jaman
- Rashed Mamun Apu as Ripon
- Saberi Alam
- Sylvi
- Asura Nowren Priya Ananya as item girl in the song "Tui Boro Seyna Bondhu"

== Music ==
The film's soundtrack is composed by Emon Saha, Shahriar Rafat and Avijit Jitu. All the songs released on YouTube by Tiger Media and BDFilm Buzz.

Track listing
| No. | Title | Lyrics | Music | Singer(s) | Length |
|---|---|---|---|---|---|
| 1. | "Ei Mone Hoi Jitya Gechi" | Shejul Hossain | Avijit Jitu | Raz Hasan | 2:54 |
| 2. | "Tui Boro Sheyana Bondhu" | Shejul Hossain | Shahriar Rafat | Shahriar Rafat and Shikriti | 4:02 |

== Filming ==
The film was shot in June 2023 at different locations in Dhaka and Rajshahi, Bangladesh.

== Release ==
The first look poster of the film was revealed on the occasion of Victory Day on December 16, 2023. Its second look poster was revealed on the occasion of New Year, which went viral.

The film was cleared by the Bangladesh Film Censor Board without any cuts on October 30, 2023. It was released on January 19, 2024, in 19 theaters clashing with Kagojer Bou and the Indian Bengali-language film Hubba, imported to Bangladesh.
