= Shahenshah (2020 film) =

2020 Bangladeshi film by Shamim Ahamed Roni

- Theatrical release poster
- Bengali: শাহেনশাহ
- Directed by: Shamim Ahamed Roni
- Written by: Delowar Hossain Dil
- Screenplay by: Shamim Ahamed Roni
- Story by: Anshuman & Prameet
- Produced by: Selim Khan
- Starring: Shakib Khan; Nusrat Faria; Rodela Jannat; Amit Hasan; Misha Sawdagor
- Cinematography: Saiful Shaheen
- Edited by: Touhid Hossain Chowdhury
- Music by: Savvy; Dabbu; Lincon Roy Chowdhury; Imran Mahmudul
- Production company: Shapla Media
- Distributed by: Live Technologies Limited
- Release date: March 6, 2020
- Running time: 152 minutes
- Country: Bangladesh
- Language: Bengali
- Budget: est. ৳ 25 million

Shahenshah (Bengali: শাহেনশাহ) is a 2020 Bangladeshi action romantic drama film directed by Shamim Ahamed Roni. The film stars Shakib Khan, Nusrat Faria and Rodela Jannat in the lead roles. The cast also includes Misha Sawdagor, Ahmed Sharif, Amit Hasan, Shiba Shanu, and Don in supporting roles. Shapla Media produced the film.

The film was supposed to begin filming on September 11, 2018. But the pre-production work was not completed and later the filming was delayed. The principal photography of the film begun on October 23, 2018, and wrapped up on 19 December 2018. The film's soundtrack album was composed by Savvy, Dabbu, Lincon Roy Chowdhury, Imran Mahmudul. It was the 5th directorial venture of Shamim Ahamed Roni, also 4th collaboration between Shakib Khan and director and 1st between Khan and Faria. It was the first solo Bangladeshi film starring Nusraat Faria, who had previously acted few co-production films with India.

After postponing 4 times its release, the film was later released on March 6, 2020. Despite having set the release date several times, later the film was criticised for not releasing. The feature was theatrically released in Bangladesh amid the COVID-19 pandemic, which affected its commercial performance due to the closing of the cinemas.

== Plot ==
The story begins in Jamshedpur in 2000. Younger brother of notorious criminal Daud blasts a car of a police officer. Then the story begins again in Nawabganj in 2019.

An MP was held captive by a local goon. Then Shahenshah came and beat the goons. Then the MP decided to send Shahenshah to establish the rule of law in his area. Shahenshah's friends tried to stop Shahenshah, but Shahenshah stopped them and agreed to go to Nawabganj. Then Shahenshah's friends told him about Nawabganj. While talking about Nawabganj, they talked about Boro Nabab. Then Boro Nabab was seen.

When a journalist wrote against Boro Nabab in a newspaper, Boro Nabab sent his right-hand man, Niaz Sharif, to kill the journalist. Niaz and Boro Nabab's men brutally killed the journalist.

Then Choto Nabab is seen. The people of Nawabganj are scared and angry because Boro Nabab's people killed the journalist. They want to stop the work of Choto Nabab's project. They protest for freedom from the misrule of the Nababs. Then Choto Nabab and his men went there and killed some of the protestors and threatened the leader of the movement. When the leader did not obey, the Nabab's men killed him too.

Even after hearing that something so bad could happen, Shahenshah doesn't back down. He says that he knows Big Boss's servant, Khaja Khan. He kept Nababganj somewhat calm by making the two Nababs afraid of Big Boss.

Khaja Khan went to pick Big Boss's son DJ, while DJ himself was coming. Then DJ and Shahenshah's friends got into a fight. Then Shahenshah beat DJ and disappear him, and went to Nababganj himself, disguised as DJ.

During a local fight Shahenshah saw Choto Nabab's daughter Priya and fall in love with her. And in a color festival he met with Boro Nabab's daughter Laila and fall in love with her. Shahenshah convinced Nababs for live with Priya and Laila. In the festival of the centenary of Nababganj, Shahenshah was exposed. Then in an abandoned castle, Shahenshah told them about his target.

Khaja Khan became suspicious of Shahenshah. So he asked DJ's uncle to send him a picture of DJ. After seeing the picture, Khaja Khan was convinced that Shahenshah of Nawabganj was not actually DJ. Then DJ's uncle Mostak came to the country.

Then Shahenshah hides Mostak, DJ and Khaja Khan and asks Big Boss to come to the country.

It was later revealed that Shahenshah is the son of the late police officer Badsha. Badsha is the same police officer whom Daud had killed 19 years ago. The criminal Daud is now known as Big Boss.

Big Boss kills the police chief and frees DJ and Mostak and escapes. Then he takes Laila and Priya away to punish Shahenshah. Then Shahenshah kills Big Boss, Mostak and DJ. After that, he frees Laila and Priya.

At last of the film, Priya told Laila to marry Shahenshah.

== Cast ==
- Shakib Khan as Shahenshah, A police officer and chief of hit squad who wants to establish the rule of law in Nawabganj
  - Rudro Moon as young Shahenshah
- Nusraat Faria as Laila, daughter of Boro Nabab.
- Rodela Jannat as Priya, daughter of Choto Nabab.
- Misha Sawdagor as Daud aka Big Boss, a notorious criminal
- Amit Hasan as Mostak, uncle of DJ
- Sadek Bachchu as Khaja Khan, servant of Big Boss
- Ahmed Sharif as Boro Nabab, Laila's father and landlord of Nawabganj
- Nana Shah as Choto Nabab, Priya's father and landlord of Nawabganj
- Uzzal as Badsha, police officer and Shahenshah's father who was killed by Daud
- Shiba Shanu as Niaz Sharif , right hand of Boro Nabab
- Kamol Patekar as the right hand of Choto Nabab
- DJ Shohel as DJ, son of Big Boss
- Borda Mithu as the MP of Nawabganj
- Subrata as the chief of police
- Rebeka as Boro Nabab's wife
- Bobi as a police officer of Nababganj
- Fakira as a local don
- Rahat
- Sanko Panja
- Pujon

== Production ==
=== Development ===
The film's digital content partner is Live Technologies. Nusraat Faria's elder sister Maria Mrittika is also worked as its costume designer and Faria's makeup man.

=== Pre-production ===
In August 2018, after complete the filming of Captain Khan, The Shapla Media producer Selim Khan announced to make another film with Shakib Khan titled Shahenshah. He confirmed this to Channel i on August 5, 2018. He informed that "Shakib Khan and Nusraat Faria will be working together for the first time in the film of Shahenshah. The film will be directed by Shamim Ahamed Roni. There will be another actress in the film." The producer also informed that Shakib Khan and Nusraat Faria will sign a contract for the film on August 5, 2018. Then on August 7, director Shamim Ahamed Roni confirmed the news of his involvement with the film through a Facebook post. Later on September 5, 2018, the film's official Muharat was held in Dhaka, where besides Shakib Khan and Nusraat Faria, newcomer Rodela Jannat's name were also announced. According to Channel i, model-turned-actress Tanjin Tisha was supposed to work with Nusraat Faria in the film before Rodela Jannat. Primarily, Tanjin Tisha agreed to work in the film, but later withdrew herself. Later, Rodela Jannat was confirmed for the film instead of Tisha.

=== Filming ===
Shahenshah was supposed to began filming on September 11, 2018, in Cox's Bazar. But the pre-production work was not completed and the filming was delayed. The principal photography of the film was begun on October 23, 2018, at Bangladesh Film Development Corporation. The first lot was filmed till November 3, 2018. The shooting of the film completed on 19 December 2018 in Pubail, Dhaka, where Shakib Khan, Nusraat Faria, Rodela Jannat and the entire unit of the film took part. Earlier, several lots were shot in different locations of Dhaka including BFDC, Aftab Nagar. A song scene with Shakib Khan-Faria was filmed at BFDC from February 1–4, 2019 and other song scenes with Shakib Khan-Rodela were shot at different locations in Cox's Bazar on 5–6 February 2019. All the songs were choreographed by Baba Yadav from India.

== Soundtrack ==
Shahenshah (Original Motion Picture Soundtrack)

Soundtrack album by Savvy, Dabbu
- Released: 2020
- Recorded: 2018
- Genre: Feature Film Soundtrack
- Length: 17:32
- Language: Bengali
- Label: Live Technologies
- Producer: Savvy, Dabbu

Singles from Shahenshah
- 1. "Roshik Amar" Released: 25 February 2019; 2. "Premer Raja" Released: 21 March 2019; 3. "O Priya" Released: 25 August 2019; 4. "Tui Ami Chol" Released: 13 September 2019

Savvy chronology
Hoichoi Unlimited (2018)	Shahenshah (2019)	Password (2019)

Dabbu chronology
Network (2019)	Shahenshah (2019)	Harano Prapti (2020)

The soundtrack of Shahenshah is composed by Savvy, Dabbu, Lincon Roy Chowdhury and Imran. The first song from the soundtrack was revealed on February 25, 2019, and sung by Savvy and Kona. The first stanza of this song titled "Roshik Amar" is collected. The rest is written by Priyo Bhattacharya and music composed and arranged by Savvy. Also the song is choreographed by Indian Baba Yadav. Within 48 hours of its release, the song was viewed by over 1.6 million viewers on YouTube. The second song from the soundtrack titled "Premer Raja" sung by Imran and Kona was released on March 21, 2019.The song is composed by Dabbu and written by Prasenjit Mallick. The third song from the soundtrack titled "O Priya" sung by Ashok Singh, released on 25 August 2019, which written and composed by Lincon Roy Chowdhury. The four and final song titled "Tui Ami Chol" released on 13 September 2019 sung Imran and Atiya Anisha. Which is composed by Imran himself and written by Snehasish Ghosh. All the songs from the soundtrack were released on its digital content partner Live Technologies' YouTube channel Unlimited Audio Video.

Track list
No.	Title	Lyrics	Music	Singer(s)	Length
1.	"Roshik Amar (রসিক আমার)"	Priyo Chattopadhyay	Savvy	Savvy and Kona	3:29
2.	"Premer Raja (প্রেমের রাজা)"	Prasenjit Mallick	Dabbu	Imran and Kona	3:50
3.	"O Priya (ও প্রিয়া)"	Lincon Roy Chowdhury	Lincon Roy Chowdhury	Ashok Singh	5:30
4.	"Tui Ami Chol (তুই আমি চল)"	Snahashish Ghosh	Imran	Imran and Atiya Anisha	4:43
Total length:					14:03

== Promotion and release ==
The first promotional first look teaser of the film was released on January 25, 2019. Its first look poster was revealed on March 11, 2019. The film was cleared by the Bangladesh Film Censor Board without any cuts on 12 March 2019. The second poster of the film made by Sajjadul Islam Sayem was revealed on 16 March 2019. Its official trailer was released on 1 April 2019, which has over 2.4 million views on YouTube, as of July 2021.

=== Release ===
The film initially scheduled for a release on the occasion of 15 February 2019, a day after Valentine's Day, but was postponed for the film's promotion and rescheduled to release on the occasion of 2019 Eid al-Fitr. Later, as a result of the release of Shakib Khan's film Password on Eid al-Fitr, the film's release date was again postponed and it was rescheduled to release on the occasion of 2019 Eid al-Adha. The production company Shapla Media rescheduled set to release on 4 October 2019, but also postponed it due to political unrest in the country. Producer Selim Khan said that it will be released on the occasion of 2020 Eid al-Fitr. After postponed 4 times to release, the film was later released on March 6, 2020, in 77 theaters across Bangladesh.
