= Moner Moto Manush Pailam Na =

2019 Bangladeshi film directed by Jakir Hossain Raju

Moner Moto Manush Pailam Naa
- Theatrical Poster
- Bengali: মনের মতো মানুষ পাইলাম না
- Directed by: Jakir Hossain Raju
- Written by: Jakir Hossain Raju
- Screenplay by: Abdullah Zahir Babu
- Produced by: Enamul Haque Arman
- Starring: Shakib Khan; Shabnom Bubly; Fakhrul Bashar Masum; Saberi Alam; Misha Sawdagor; Don
- Cinematography: M. H. Swapan
- Edited by: Touhid Hossain Chowdhury
- Music by: Emon Saha
- Production company: Desh Bangla Multimedia
- Distributed by: Desh Bangla Multimedia
- Release date: 12 August 2019
- Running time: 146 minutes
- Country: Bangladesh
- Language: Bangla
- Budget: ৳20 million

Moner Moto Manush Pailam Na (Bengali: মনের মতো মানুষ পাইলাম না; transl. I didn't find any person like me) is a 2019 Bangladeshi legal drama romantic film written and directed by Jakir Hossain Raju. It featured Shakib Khan and Shabnom Bubly in the lead roles. Misha Sawdagor, Fakhrul Bashar Masum, Saberi Alam, Don and others played supporting roles. It was produced by Enamul Haque Arman under the banner of Desh Bangla Multimedia. The film soundtrack was composed by Shafiq Tuhin.

Principal photography began on June 15, 2019, and wrapped up July 24. It was released on August 12, 2019, in Bangladesh on the occasion of Eid al-Adha. The film won several National Film Awards at the 44th National Film Awards including Jakir Hossain Raju's Best Dialogue Award.

== Cast ==
- Shakib Khan as Shadhin Chowdhury, a barrister
- Shabnom Bubly as Sultana Haque Arpita, president of Alo Shamajik O Sangsrikitik Sangathan
- Fakhrul Bashar Masum as Shadhin Chowdhury's father
- Saberi Alam as Shadhin Chowdhury's mother
- Misha Sawdagor as Syed Ehsan
- Don as Syed Ehsan's goon
- Tanami Haque as Jannat

== Production ==
In 2013, the director of the film Jakir Hossain Raju announced to making the film with Shakib Khan and Apu Biswas. Then the Muharat of the film was also held with them. After that, filming started to be delayed.

In 2019, Jakir Hossain Raju changed the cast and story of the film and added Shabnom Bubly to the list of actors instead of Apu Biswas.

=== Filming ===
After the filming of three songs from the film Password ended in Turkey in May 2019, two songs from the film Moner Moto Manush Pailam Na were filmed.

The principal photography of the film began on June 15, 2019. Then on June 17 the Muhurat of the film was held for the second time at Dhaka Club in Dhaka. The lead actress of the film Shabnom Bubly was injured during the shooting of the film on June 25. She later received first aid and took part in the shooting of the film from June 26. The filming was completed on July 24, 2019.

== Soundtrack ==
Moner Moto Manush Pailam Na

Soundtrack album by Shafiq Tuhin
- Released: August 12, 2019
- Recorded: July, 2019
- Studio: Desh Bangla Multimedia
- Genre: Feature film soundtrack
- Length: 18:44
- Language: Bangla
- Label: SK Films
- Producer: Shafiq Tuhin

Singles from Moner Moto Manush Pailam Na
- 1. "Koto Bhalobashi Tore (কতো ভালবাসি তোরে)" Released: 28 July 2019; 2. "Pran Juriye Jay (প্রান জুড়িয়ে যায়)" Released: 06 August 2019; 3. "Moner Moto Manush Pailam Na (মনের মতো মানুষ পাইলাম না)" Released: 08 August 2019; 4. "E Khancha Vangte Hobe (এ খাঁচা ভাঙতে হবে)" Released: 09 August 2019

Shafiq Tuhin chronology
Bhalo Theko (2018)	Moner Moto Manush Pailam Na (2019)

The film soundtrack composed by Shafiq Tuhin. The first song of the film is "Koto Bhalobashi Tore" was released on YouTube on 28 July 2019 as a promotional single track. The track is written by Shafiq Tuhin himself and sung by Imran Mahmudul and Swaralipi. Then the second track of the film "Pran Juriye Jay" released on August 6. The track is written by director Jakir Hossain Raju and sung by Mahtim Sakib and Kheya. Mahtim Shakib made his debut as a playback singer through the song. The title track "Moner Moto Manush Pailam Na" released on August 8, 2019, and written by Jakir Hossain Raju and sung by Jahangir Sayeed. Its fourth and last track "E Khancha Vangte Hobe" was released on August 9, 2019. The track is written by Shafiq Tuhin and sung by Lemis. All of songs of the film was released on Khan's YouTube channel SK Films.

No.	Title	Lyrics	Music	Singer(s)	Length
1.	"Koto Bhalobasi Tore (কতো ভালবাসি তোরে)"	Shafiq Tuhin	Shafiq Tuhin	Imran Mahmudul and Swaralipi	4:48
2.	"Pran Juriye Jay (প্রান জুড়িয়ে যায়)"	Jakir Hossain Raju	Shafiq Tuhin	Mahtim Shakib and Kheya	5:52
3.	"Moner Moto Manush Pailam Na (মনের মতো মানুষ পাইলাম না )" (Title Track)	Jakir Hossain Raju	Shafiq Tuhin	Jahangir Sayeed	4:09
4.	"E Khancha Vangte Hobe (এ খাঁচা ভাঙতে হবে)"	Shafiq Tuhin	Shafiq Tuhin	Lemis	3:55
Total length:					18:44

== Marketing and release ==
The film official first look poster revealed on August 1, 2019. After that, Its official trailer released on YouTube on August 7, 2019. On July 30, 2019, the film received clearance from the Censor Board without any cuts.

=== Release ===
The film was released on 15 August 2019 in 154 theaters in Bangladesh on the occasion of Eid al-adha.

== Reception ==
=== Critical response ===
Rumman Rashid Khan on Bangla Movie Database praised the performance of the lead characters of the film but criticized it for the success of the name. He wrote, "The director could have make a smart film in a modern screenplay with this story with more care by editing, working with the camera or taking time off."

=== Awards and nominations ===
Awards	Category	Nominee	Result	ref
National Film Awards	Best Dialogue	Jakir Hossain Raju	Won	
National Film Awards	Best Choreography	Habibur Rahman	Won	
National Film Awards	Best Art Direction	Rahmatullah Basu and Farid Ahmed	Won	

== Home video ==
The film revealed on online streaming platform Bongo BD on the occasion on New Year of 2021 on 31 December 2020.
