= DayMukti =

- Poster
- Directed by: Badiul Alam Khokon
- Written by: Komol Sarkar
- Screenplay by: Badiul Alam Khokon
- Story by: Komol Sarkar
- Produced by: MD Jasim Uddin
- Starring: Symon Sadik; Susmi Rahman; Abul Hayat; Dilara Zaman; Sucharita; Subrata; Samia Nahi
- Cinematography: Asaduzzaman Majnu
- Edited by: Touhid Hossain Chowdhury
- Music by: Ali Akram Shuvo
- Production company: Raisa Film Production
- Release date: 7 February 2025
- Country: Bangladesh
- Language: Bengali

Daymukti (Bengali: দায়মুক্তি; transl. Immunity) is a 2025 Bangladeshi Bengali-language family drama film with a screenplay and direction by Badiul Alam Khokon. It is produced by Md Jasim Uddin under the banner of Raisa Film Production and funded by a government grant. The film stars Symon Sadik, Sushmi Rahman, Samia Nahi, Abul Hayat, Dilara Zaman in lead roles and other roles played by Shuchorita, Subrata, and Syed Rafi Uddin Salim. The film is based on the story of an old age home.

== Cast ==
- Symon Sadik as Akash
- Susmi Rahman as Mithila
- Samiya Nahi as Kobita
- Abul Hayat as Shawkat Rahman
- Dilara Zaman as Momtaz
- Shuchorita as Geetali
- Subrata as Iqbal
- Syed Rafi Uddin Salim
- Sheuly
- Jaya
- Ananya as Young Mithila

== Production ==
DayMukti received a government grant in 2017 but filming could not start until 2020. Symon and Sushmi signed the film at a studio in the capital city (Dhaka) on Thursday evening 24 September 2020. Just before a day of Victory Day on 15 December 2021, the government-funded film DayMukti received censor clearance.

=== Filming ===
The shooting of the film DayMukti started on 5 November 2020. Earlier the director was Komol Sarkar. Later Badiul Alam Khokon finished the work of the film. Principal photography completed in June 2021.

=== Casting ===
In this film two leading roles are played by Bangladeshi notable actors Abul Hayat and Dilara Zaman, both of them have won the Ekushey Padak and the National Film Awards, they are playing debut lead roles for the first time in this film.

== Music ==
In this movie, Monir Khan has given voice to a song written by Moniruzzaman Monir, and the film's music is composed by Ali Akram Shuvo.

== Release ==
Although the shooting of this film was completed, the issue of release was stuck due to various reasons. The movie was released nationwide on 7 February 2025, nearly seven years after receiving the initial government grant.

On the occasion of the release of this film, a press conference was organized at a restaurant in the capital on 3 February 2025. The film was released in twenty theaters on 7 February 2025, clashing with the Iqbal Hossain Chowdhury's film Boli.

== Reception ==
RisingBD wrote that "Since the release of the song 'Ontre Bahire' of this movie directed by Badiul Alam, the song has been spreading fascination. Many in the audience are appreciating the lyrics, melody and singer of this new song". Dhaka Mail wrote that "The government-funded movie has received a good response from the audience after its release. Its story, production style and acting are getting appreciation from the audience". NewG24 wrote that "After watching the movie, the president of Bangladesh Film Club Limited, Lion M. Nazrul Islam Chowdhury said, 'The story is the soul of this movie. I watched the movie with family. The movie, which is a social story, has many messages. This generation should watch the movie". Amar Barta wrote that ""Premer Taj Mahal's famous director Gazi Mahbub said, "The movie has many messages, which the young generation of today needs to see." The story will hold the audience throughout. Moreover, Abul Hayat, Dilara Zaman, Shuchorita Apa performed very well and Sushmi Rahman have performed well as a newcomer. All in all a movie worth watching with the family. I like it very much".
