= Moynar Char =

- Poster
- Bengali: ময়নার চর
- Directed by: Mostafizur Rahman Babu
- Screenplay by: Mostafizur Rahman Babu
- Story by: Chatku Ahmed
- Produced by: Bangladesh Government; Sumon Parvez
- Starring: Mamnun Hasan Emon; Shusmi Rahman; Shiba Shanu; Danny Raj
- Cinematography: SS Azhar
- Edited by: Akramul Haque
- Music by: Syed Moshlesur Rahman
- Production companies: Bangladesh Government; Sami Banichitra
- Release date: 30 January 2026
- Country: Bangladesh
- Language: Bengali

Moynar Char (Bengali: ময়নার চর) is a 2026 Bangladeshi drama feature film screenplay and directed by Mostafizur Rahman Babu and story and dialogue by Chatku Ahmed and the film's music track composed by Sahabuddin Mojumdar. Produced by Bangladesh Government and co-produced Sumon Parvez under the banner of Sami Banichitra. The film stars Mamnun Hasan Emon and Shusmi Rahman in the lead role alongside Shiba Shanu, Danny Raj, Azam Khan, Polash Luho, Mahmudul Hasan, Mishkat Mahmud and others in the supporting role.

== Cast ==
- Mamnun Hasan Emon as Kashem
- Shusmi Rahman as Moyna
- Shiba Shanu
- Danny Raj
- Azam Khan
- Polash Luho
- Mahmudul Hasan
- Mishkat Mahmud

== Release ==
The film received government grant of Tk 7.5 million In the 2023–24 fiscal year. After received the sensor clearance from the Bangladesh Film Certification Board without any cuts, the film was scheduled to release on theaters on 16 January 2026. But the film was released on 30 January 2026 and it was shot on an island of Lakshmipur.
