= Abbas Ullah Shikder =

Bangladeshi film producer (c. 1955–2020)

- Born: c. 1955
- Died: 18 January 2020 (aged 65)
- Occupations: Producer, actor, politician

Abbas Ullah Shikder (c. 1955 – 18 January 2020) was a Bangladeshi producer, actor and politician. He was the owner of Ananda TV and Anandamela Chalachitro. He was involved with the politics of the Bangladesh Awami League.

== Biography ==
Shikder was the producer of Beder Meye Josna. This film is the highest grossing Bangladeshi film. He also produced films like Moner Majhe Tumi, Molla Barir Bou and Ji Hujur. Symon Sadik and Sara Zerin made their acting career debut with Ji Hujur. Besides producing he acted in films too.

Shikder died on 18 January 2020 at the age of 65.

== Selected filmography ==
- Beder Meye Josna
- Pagol Mon
- Moner Majhe Tumi
- Molla Barir Bou
- Ji Hujur
