= Poramon =

- Theatrical poster
- Directed by: Jakir Hossain Raju
- Written by: Farzana
- Produced by: Abdul Aziz; Shish Manwer
- Starring: Mahiya Mahi; Symon Sadik; Anisur Rahman Milon; Misha Sawdagor; Shiba Shanu; Bipasha Kabir
- Edited by: Towhid Hossain Chowdhury
- Music by: Shafiq Tuhin; Ahmed Imtiaz Bulbul
- Production company: Jaaz Multimedia
- Distributed by: Jaaz Multimedia
- Release date: 14 June 2013
- Running time: 145 minutes
- Country: Bangladesh
- Language: Bengali

Poramon is a 2013 Bangladeshi Bengali romantic drama film directed by Jakir Hossain Raju and written by Farzana. It was distributed by Jaaz Multimedia. It stars Symon Sadik and Mahiya Mahi. A stand alone sequel Poramon 2 was released on 16 June 2018. It is officially remake of 2010 Tamil film Mynaa, directed by Prabhu Solomon.

== Plot ==
'Sujon' is a reckless boy of 'Sundorpur'. But his father becomes addicted to gambling, which changes his life. He started working as a helper of "Chander Gari". There he meets 'Pori' and in time they fall in love. But Pori's mother is not happy about this and she fixes Pori's marriage elsewhere, which upsets Sujon greatly. He becomes furious and destroys Pori's mother's cake shop. Pori's mother tries to kill Sujon with a sharp weapon but the villagers stop her. So Pori's mother files a complaint with the police against Sujon who is arrested. The police officer Abid likes him which makes it easy for Sujon to flee from the station. Sujon goes to stop the wedding and escape into the forest with Pori. Abid starts to look for them. But in one situation Sujon rescues Abid from danger and saves Abid's life. So Abid promises to make their marriage happen.

== Cast ==
- Mahiya Mahi as Pori
  - Sharika as young Pori
- Symon as Sujon
  - Prachurjo as young Sujon
- Anisur Rahman Milon as Abid
- Bipasha Kabir as Mukti
- Ali Raj as Sujon's father
- Monira Mithu as Pori's mother
- Rehana Jolly
- Misha Sawdagor
- Shiba Shanu
- Gulshan Ara Ahmed

== Response ==
Asian TV's Movie Bazaar survey chose Poramon as the "Most Loved Film of Year".

== Awards ==
Award Title	Category	Name	Result	Ref.
Bioscope Borsho- Shera Awards	Best Film actor	Symon Sadik	Won	
Bioscope Borsho- Shera Awards	Best Couple with (Mahiya Mahi)	Symon Sadik	Won	
Bioscope Borsho- Shera Awards	Best Film Actress	Mahiya Mahi	Nominated	
Bioscope Borsho- Shera Awards	Best couple with (Symon Sadik)	Mahiya Mahi	Nominated	

== Sequel ==
After Poramon's success, a sequel named Poramon 2 released on 16 June 2018 in the banner of Jaaz Multimedia. The sequel is also a successful film.
