= Silence: A Musical Journey =

2025 Bangladeshi musical film

- Poster
- Directed by: Emon Saha
- Screenplay by: Emon Saha
- Story by: Emon Saha
- Produced by: Emon Saha
- Starring: Symon Sadik; Neelanjona Neela; Intekhab Dinar; Azad Abul Kalam
- Cinematography: Rafiqul Islam
- Edited by: Touhid Hossain Chowdhury
- Music by: Emon Saha
- Production company: Moonland Productions
- Distributed by: Jaaz Multimedia; Civic Real Estate Ltd. Channel i
- Release date: 7 November 2025
- Country: Bangladesh
- Language: Bengali

Silence: A Musical Journey is a 2025 Bangladeshi Bengali-language musical drama film directed by Emon Saha, it is the directorial debut film of the seven times winner of the Bangladesh National Film Award for Best Music Composer Emon Saha. The film also produced by Emon Saha under the banner of his own production company Moonland Productions and the film was distributed by Jaaz Multimedia. It's stars Symon Sadik, Neelanjona Neela, Intekhab Dinar, Azad Abul Kalam and others.

== Cast ==
- Symon Sadik as Ali
- Neelanjona Neela as Maya
- Intekhab Dinar as Disco Dinar "DD"
- Azad Abul Kalam as Shadhu Baba
- Mili Bashar
- Siam Nasir
- Pavel
- Shikonna
- Jhuna Chowdhury
- Tipu Alam
- Sheikh Sadi Khan as himself, guest appearance

== Production ==
In end of 2022, it was announced that composer and music director Emon Saha was making a short film as directorial debut titled Silence: A Musical Journey. But after three years, Emon Saha announced that he had changed his plans. Silence: A Musical Journey is being made into a full-length film and will be released in theaters. The film has produced by under the own production company of Emon Saha. Emon Saha completed the official formalities with the Bangladesh Film Directors Association on 1 July 2025 to produce this film. And the musician also registered the name of the new movie with the Directors Association. It was previously in 2022 Prothom Alo reported that Jeetu Ahsan and Zinat Sanu Swagata would star in the film but they are no longer part of the final lineup.

== Release ==
The first look poster of the film was released on 31 October 2025 on social media by Emon Saha.

The film was released on 7 November 2025 in theaters. The film are running at 5 branches of the modern multiplex Star Cineplex: Blockbuster, Lion, Shyamoli Cinema Hall, Momo Inn in Bogra, Grand Sylhet, Sena Auditorium in Savar, Cinescope in Narayanganj, Swapnil in Kushtia, and Sugandha in Chittagong crashing with the organizing by Star Cineplex a special events to celebrate the birthday of Humayun Ahmed, to mark his 77th birth anniversary, the multiplex is organizing 'Humayun Ahmed Week' at 7 November and re-released four old films as Noy Number Bipod Sanket (2007) and Bangladesh National Film Award winning film Daruchini Dwip (2007), Amar Ache Jol (2008) and Ghetuputra Komola (2012) which received National Film Awards in nine categories and the film was nominated as the Bangladeshi entry for the Best Foreign Language Oscar at the 85th Academy Awards. The film also crashing with the film Mon Je Bojhena (2025) directed by Ayesha Siddiqua and starring Arifin Shuvoo and Tama Mirza, which the film was shoot in 2013 but released after 12 years later.

== Reception ==
The has been received mixed reviews: Pritha Parmita Nag from Prothom Alo wrote that "There were exaggerated acting, inconsistencies in the scenes, and even Emon Saha's background music was inconsistent. After arriving in Dhaka, the story suddenly takes a 360-degree turn, becoming that formulaic commercial movie of the eighties and nineties! Although Intekhab Dinar is shown as a villain in this movie, the sudden change in the character also seems inconsistent. It is not clear why his change does not affect Maya".

Shomoy Kal wrote that "Neelanjona Neela tried to portray different aspects of Maya's character, but she could not capture the multidimensionality of the character. Azad Abul Kalam gave a believable performance as the village Baul. However, Symon Sadik's character as Ali was out of place and Intekhab Dinar as Disco Dinar was initially inconsistent, but later his emotional scene was impeccable".

Khoborwala wrote that "‘Silence: A Musical Journey’ is a musical drama that attempts to portray the struggles of the music world. However, its execution falters in various aspects. The rural setting of Maya’s character feels mismatched with the city’s urban backdrop, and there are numerous inconsistencies in the story. From the ill-fitting romantic scenes to the over-the-top acting, the film fails to maintain a coherent tone, especially after Maya and Ali’s arrival in Dhaka. The movie's central flaw lies in its weak script, exaggerated performances, and inconsistent narrative, making it hard for the audience to connect with the characters".

Khoborwala also wrote that "The main problems of the movie: Weak screenplay, Exaggerated acting, Inconsistency between scenes, Clumsy construction. Additionally, one of the film's main strengths was its songs, which set the mood for the audience throughout the film. However, other aspects, especially the cinematography and editing, were quite weak. It can be said that 'Silence: A Musical Journey' had the potential to be a good story, but due to poor production, it was not presented to the audience in the desired form".
