= Nijhum Rubina =

Bangladeshi model and film actress

- Born: 28 January; Bijoypur, Comilla, Bangladesh
- Occupations: Model, actress
- Years active: 2008-present
- Notable work: Er Beshi Bhalobasha Jay Na, Ostitto

Nijhum Rubina (Bengali: নিঝুম রুবিনা) is a Bangladeshi model and film actress. She was born in Bijoypur, Comilla, Bangladesh. Rubina made her career debut as a model in the television commercial of Grameen Phone in 2008. After that, she appeared many television commercial like Coffee Cap Chocolate, Sharif Melamine, Ranga Pori Mehendi, Ranga Pori Hair Oils and many others.

== Career ==
She made her career debut in Dhallywood by the film Er Beshi Bhalobasha Jay Na, directed by Jakir Hossain Raju in 2013 with Dhallywood actor Symon Sadik. It was her first commercial success movie. In 2014, her another film Onek Shadhonar Pore, directed by Abul Kalam Azad has been released. In 2016, her romantic film Ostitto has been released. She also acted another film named Kistir Jala, directed by Nur Mohammad Moni, but this film is not released yet. She is assigned for several Dhallywood films and several TV commercials.

== Filmography ==
Key
| † | Denotes films that have not yet been released |

| Year | Films | Role | Notes | Ref. |
|---|---|---|---|---|
| 2013 | Er Beshi Bhalobasha Jay Na | Kiran | Debut film | |
| 2014 | Onek Shadhonar Pore | Priya | | |
| 2016 | Ostitto | Orsha | | |
| 2018 | Megh Konna | | | |
| 2018 | Postmaster 71 | | | |
| 2019 | Bhalobasha.com | | | |
| TBA | Jaan Re † | TBA | | |
| TBA | Oshomapto Premer Golpo † | TBA | | |
