= Lal Shari =

- Theatrically released poster
- Directed by: Bandhan Biswas
- Screenplay by: Bandhan Biswas
- Story by: Tanveer Sydney
- Produced by: Apu Biswas
- Starring: Symon Sadik; Apu Biswas; Sumit Sengupta; Dilruba Doyel; Shahiduzzaman Selim; Shahed Ali
- Cinematography: Bishwajit Dutta
- Edited by: Akramul Haque
- Music by: Emon Saha
- Production company: Apu–Joy Cholochitra
- Distributed by: The Abhi Kathachitra
- Release date: 29 June 2023
- Country: Bangladesh
- Language: Bengali

Lal Shari is a 2023 Bangladeshi romantic drama film directed and written by Bandhan Biswas and produced by Apu Biswas under the banner of Apu–Joy Cholochitra. The film stars Symon Sadik, Apu Biswas, Sumit Sengupta, Dilruba Doyel, Shahiduzzaman Selim, Shahed Ali, Mahmudul Islam Mithu, Subrata, and Don. It marked Apu Biswas' debut as a producer.

== Cast ==
- Symon Sadik as Raju
- Apu Biswas as Sraboni
- Sumit Sengupta as Porimol
- Dilruba Doyel as Monia
- Shahiduzzaman Selim as Kashem Mohajon
- Shahed Ali as Shamim
- Mahmudul Islam Mithu as Gopal
- Subrata as Sraboni's father
- Rabeka Rouf as Sraboni's mother
- Don as Bodi

== Production ==
The film was produced by Apu Biswas, which was her first production with a government grant under the banner of her Apu–Joy Cholochitra. Apu Biswas received a government grant of Tk 65 lakh in the financial year 2021–22 for this film. This actress added more to this money. The film cost close to 1 crore Bangladeshi taka.

=== Filming ===
Principal photography began on 2 November 2022 in Manikganj on the bank of the Padma River. The first lot of filming was shot in Manikganj till 20 November 2022.

Shooting also took place in Kaurichala village of Harirampur Upazila of Manikganj District. The set was built in a rural environment.

== Release ==
The film was released in 12 theaters on 29 June 2023 on Eid al-Fitr.

== Awards ==
Year	Award	Category	Winner	Result	Ref.
2026	Bangladesh National Film Awards 2023	Best Choreographer	Habibur Rahman Habib	Won	
