= 111: A Nelson Number =

- Genre: Horror; Thriller
- Written by: Sirajul Islam
- Directed by: Nayeem Imtiaz Neyamul
- Starring: Anisur Rahman Milon; Nusrat Imrose Tisha; Apurba; Emon; Abir Khan; Humaira Himu
- Composer: S I Tutul
- Country of origin: Bangladesh
- Original language: Bengali
- No. of episodes: 26

Production
- Producer: Ferdaus Ahmed
- Production location: Bangladesh
- Editors: Israfil Bablu; Rasel Zayedi
- Running time: 21 minutes

Original release
- Network: NTV
- Release: 27 September 2007 – 17 April 2008

111: A Nelson Number is a Bangladeshi supernatural drama television series based on a dorm room numbered 111, where the students living there are spooked by unnatural presence. The series was directed by Nayeem Imtiaz Neyamul, written by Sirajul Islam and produced by Ferdaus. The series, which aired at 9:45 pm on NTV, began on September 27, 2007 and ended after 26 episodes on April 17, 2008.

== Cast ==
Actor
Anisur Rahman Milon
Nusrat Imrose Tisha
Apurba
Emon
Abir Khan
Humaira Himu
