= Symon Sadik =

Bangladeshi film actor, model, assistant director, lyricist and director

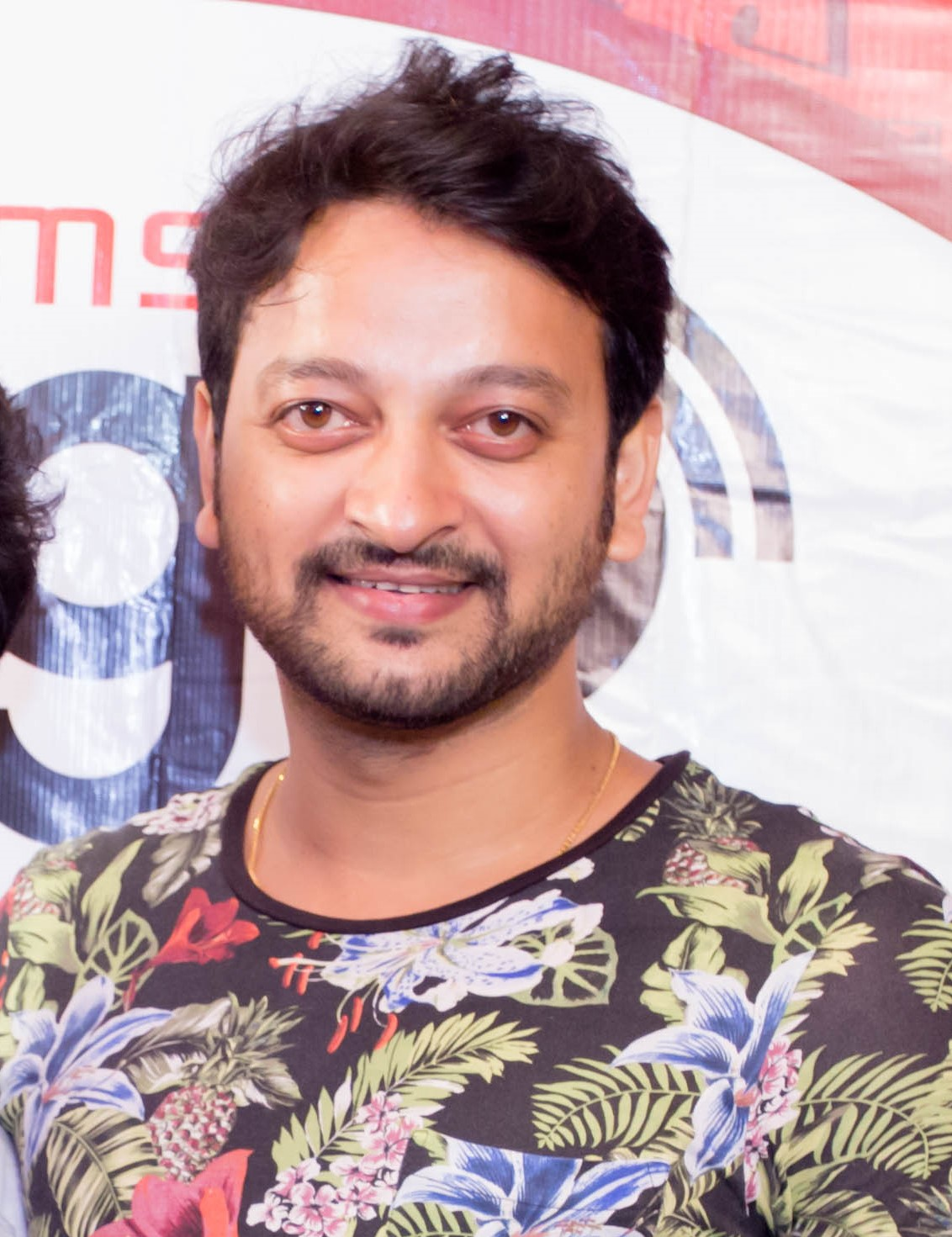
- Born: Sadik Mohammed Symon; 30 August 1985 (age 41); Kishoreganj District, Bangladesh
- Occupations: Actor; model; assistant director; lyricist; director
- Years active: 2012–present
- Spouse: Deepa Sadik (m. 2014)
- Children: 2
- Awards: Bangladesh National Film Awards for Best Actor

Sadik Mohammad Symon (born 30 August 1985), popularly known as Symon Sadik, is a Bangladeshi film actor, assistant director, lyricist, model, and former joint general secretary of the Bangladesh Film Artistes' Association. His films are predominantly in Dhallywood cinema. He made his film debut in the lead role in Ji Hujur (2012), and he won the Bioscope Borsho-Sera Awards for Best Actor in PoraMon (2013). He also won Bangladesh National Film Award for Best Actor for his role in the film Jannat (2018).

On 20 January 2024, Sadik resigned from his position as joint general secretary of the Bangladesh Film Artistes' Association. He was nominated for Meril-Prothom Alo Award for Best Film Actor for his role in the film Shesh Bazi (2024). He made directorial debut with the short film Mohasonchary (2026), it's released on Adrita Movies YouTube channel.

== Film career ==
=== 2012–2020 ===
Sadik started in 2012 with director Jakir Hossain Raju in Ji Hujur movie opposite Sara Zerin. In 2013, he was introduced to the audience by starring in the movie Poramon directed by Jakir Hossain Raju opposite Mahiya Mahi. He also acted in the Bangladeshi film Er Beshi Valobasha Jay Na directed by Jakir Hossain Raju with Nijhum Robina. Sadik starred inTui Sudhu Amar directed by Raju Chowdhury opposite Moumita Mou. He also acted in Tomar Kache Rhini directed by Shahadat Hossain Liton and opposite Toma Mirza. And Swapno Chowa directed by Shafiq Hasan with Bobby.

He starred in Mostafizur Rahman Manik's Itish Petish Prem but the name was changed to Chupi Chupi Prem (2015 film) due to censor board objections and opposite Priyonti. He also acted in Iftakar Chowdhury's Action Jasmine in (2015) with Bobby, and in Shafi Uddin Shafi's film Black Money opposite Moushumi Hamid and Keya. Sadik starred in P A Kajol's Chokher Dekha with Ahona Rahman. He also acted in 16 Ana Prem in (2016), directed by Ali Azad and opposite Taniya, and in Saimon Tarique's Matir Pori along with Sadia Islam Lamia. His next film was Apurba Rana's Pure Jay Mon with PoriMoni and A J Rana's film Ojante Valobasha opposite Alisha Pradhan and Sadik also lyrics this film's title song "Ojante Bhalobasha"

He acted opposite Mahiya Mahi in the film Jannat in (2018) directed by Mostafizur Rahman Manik. He was awarded the Bangladesh National Film Award for Best Actor in the category for his outstanding performance in the film. He also acted in Matal (2018) directed by Shahin Suman and opposite Adhora Khan.

=== 2021–present ===
On 28 January 2022, Sadik became the assistant general secretary of the Bangladesh Film Artists' Association after bagging 212 votes. In March 2022, Sadik was made temporary general secretary in the association after Zayed Khan's oath was declared illegal by the association's president.

In 2022, Sadik acted in the crime thriller film Live (2022) directed by Shamim Ahamed Roni and in 2023, released romantic drama film Lal Shari (2023) directed by Bandhan Biswas. In 19 January 2024, released his casting film Shesh Bazi (2024) directed by Mehedi Hasan. On 20 January 2024, Sadik resigned his position as joint general secretary of the Bangladesh Film Artistes' Association. He also starred Jashim Uddin Jakir's romantic drama film Maya: The Love (2024).

In 2025, His casting films are released as Badiul Alam Khokon's DayMukti (2025), Kabirul Islam Rana's Jol Rong (2025) and music composer Emon Saha's directorial debut film Silence: A Musical Journey (2025). He also made his directorial debut with the short film Mohasonchary (2026).

== Personal life ==
Sadik married Dipa Sadik in 2014 and they have two sons.

== Filmography ==
Key
†	Denotes films that have not yet been released

Year	Film	Role	Notes	Ref.
2012	Ji Hujur	Abdur Rahman	Debut film	
2013	PoraMon	Sujon		
2013	Er Beshi Bhalobasha Jay Na	Robi		
2014	Tomar Kache Rini	Raju		
2014	Tui Shudhu Amar	Shuvo		
2014	Shopno Chowa	Shakti		
2015	Action Jasmine	ASP Akash		
2015	Black Money	Srabon		
2015	Chupi Chupi Prem	Robi / Ratan / Rahman (RRR) (Note: Symon played a character with three names.)		
2016	Matir Pori	Shuvo		
2016	Pure Jay Mon	Surju		
2016	Ojante Bhalobasha	Prem	Also as lyricist	
2016	Chokher Dekha	Sadman		
2017	Mayabini	Prem		
2017	Jol Shawola	DB Officer Abir		
2017	Tui Amar	Symon (Note: Symon played role with his real name in the film.)		
2017	16 Ana Prem	Amith		
2017	Khash Jamin	Robi		
2018	Jannat	Aslam / Iftekhar (Note: Symon played a character with two or more names.)		
2018	Matal	Rana		
2022	Live	Milon Biswas		
2023	Lal Shari	Raju		
2024	Shesh Bazi	Shahed		
2024	Maya: The Love	Arif		
2025	DayMukti	Akash	25th film	
2025	Jol Rong	Alal		
2025	Silence: A Musical Journey	Ali		
2026	Anondo Osru	Farhad	Also as producer	
TBA	Dodor Golpo†	Raihan	Upcoming	
TBA	Nodir Bookey Chaad†	Chaad	Upcoming	
TBA	Narsundori†	Hakim	Upcoming	
TBA	Amar Ma Amar Behesht†	TBA	Delayed	
TBA	Gangster†	TBA	Filming	
TBA	Kajer Chele†	TBA	Filming	
TBA	Artonad†	TBA	Filming	
TBA	Bahaduri†	TBA	Filming	
TBA	Gopon Sonket†	TBA	Delayed	

=== Short films ===
Year	Film	Role	Notes	Ref.
2019	Jibon Theke Paoya	Joy	Short film	
2026	Mohasonchary	—N/a	Debut in as a director	

=== Music video ===
Year	Song	Singer	Starring	Ref.
2018	"Lal Sobuj" (Cricket Song)	Dinat Jahan Munni, Ayub Shahriar, Sabbir Zaman, Ahmad Humayun, Ronty Das & Tasnim	Mahiya Mahi, Eamin Haque Bobby, Dighi, Moushumi Hamid, Airin Sultana, Ahona Rahman	

=== Lyricist ===
Year	Title	Film	Notes	Ref.
2016	"Bhalobasha Ojante"	Ojante Bhalobasha		
2021	"Baya De"	—N/a	Election Song	

== Awards and nominations ==
Year	Award	Category	Film	Result	Ref.
2013	Bioscope Borsho – Shera Awards	Best film Actor	Poramon	Won	
2013	Bioscope Borsho – Shera Awards	Best Jury with (Mahiya Mahi)	Poramon	Won	
2014	Dhaka Agency Model Awards	Best Film Actor	—N/a	Won	
2015	Babisas Awards	For Featured Actor in (Male)	—N/a	Won	
2017	AJFB Star Awards	Best Film Actor	—N/a	Won	
2019	Bangladesh National Film Award	Best Film Actor	Jannat	Won	
2019	AJFB Star Awards	Best Film Actor	Jannat	Won	
2022	Eid Beauty Fashion Award & Expo-2022	Modelling Show	—N/a	Won	
2022	Kishoreganj District Arts Academy Award	Best Actor	—N/a	Won	
2023	Golpowala Honorary Award & Fashion Show	Best Actor	—N/a	Won	
2025	Meril-Prothom Alo Awards	Best Film Actor	Shesh Bazi	Nominated	
