= Live (2022 film) =

2022 Bangladeshi film

- Movie poster
- Directed by: Shamim Ahamed Roni
- Written by: Shamim Ahamed Roni
- Screenplay by: Shamim Ahamed Roni
- Story by: Shamim Ahamed Roni
- Produced by: Pinky Akter; Selim Khan
- Starring: Mahiya Mahi; Symon Sadik; Ador Azad; Shiba Shanu; Saberi Alam
- Cinematography: Supriya Dutta
- Edited by: MD Kalam
- Music by: Raihan
- Production company: Shapla Media
- Distributed by: Bongo BD
- Release date: 9 September 2022
- Country: Bangladesh
- Language: Bengali

Live: The Ugly Truth is a 2022 Bangladeshi thriller film written and directed by Shamim Ahamed Roni. Produced by Pinky Akter and Selim Khan under the banner of Shapla Media. The film stars Mahiya Mahi, Symon Sadik, Ador Azad, Shiba Shanu, Saberi Alam, Amin Sarkar and others. It is also streaming on Bongo BD.

== Cast ==
- Mahiya Mahi as Joya Biswas
- Symon Sadik as Milon Biswas
- Ador Azad as Piyaal Akter
- Shiba Shanu as Yunus
- Saberi Alam
- Amin Sarkar

== Release ==
The film was released in 26 theaters on 9 September 2022. Earlier, a press conference was recently held at a restaurant in Iskaton in the Dhaka city on the occasion of the release of the film directed by Shamim Ahamed Roni on September 7. Ilyas Kanchan, president of Film Artists Association, was present in it.

== Production ==
Bangladeshi film Production company 'Shapla Media' is going to produce 3 films with Symon Sadik and Mahiya Mahi. The films are - Gangster, Live, Narsundari. In which Gangster will be directed by Shaheen Sumon and the remaining two will be directed by Shamim Ahamed Roni. The film is produced by Shapla Media, it is based on a true story.

== Reception ==
Zahid Akbar from The Daily Star Bengali wrote "Live film's soundtracks are not getting what they should be. A film's soundtrack takes the film forward a lot. But in this film it is neglected. This film had beautiful songs which were wasted due to not using them at the right place in the story. The film is not bad except for some things like this".

Bangladesh News 24 wrote that "Popular khal actor and former president of Film Artistes Association Misha Sawdagor also praised Symon-Mahi after watching the movie with everyone. Misha Sawdagor said, If to say in one sentence, Symon has done amazing step by step. Mahi also suffered a lot".

Channel 24 wrote that "Fans and well-wishers are praising the beloved star Mahi after seeing the released teaser of about 2 minutes. Someone wrote, really awesome. Best wishes. Others say, it has been really wonderful". Somoyer Alo wrote that "Meanwhile, the appearance of Simon-Mahi in the teaser is quite moving for his fans. Netizens are appreciating the magnetic part of the act".

DiamondNews24 wrote that "Ever since the release of the movie 'Live', the movie has been praised on social media. Along with Symon Sadik, Mahiya Mahi and Ador Azad, Shiba Shanu is also garnering praise".

DiamondNews24 also wrote that "Fateha Balad Attin wrote on social media after watching the movie 'Live', 'After a long time I saw Mahi completely back in rhythm today in the movie "Live". He has acted with such fluency throughout that it is commendable. Ador Azad's performance was adequate even in his brief appearance. Symon Sadik's performance as the main hero or protagonist of the story felt a bit lacking, maybe there was more work to be done. But in the end, it has been arranged a bit nicely. It would have been better if the twist of the story was not understood at the beginning or if the twist was revealed then the screenplay could have been stronger! That would be better. But all together 'Live' can be called a picture of contemporary story. Those who were missing Mahiya Mahi's old tracks for a long time, will definitely find her acting fluency in this movie. That's for sure. By playing different characters in the story, it is possible to bring out a more diverse experimental performance from him. I think it is possible only if it is applied correctly".

DiamondNews24 also wrote that "After watching the movie, entertainment journalist ATM Maksudul Haque Emu wrote, "Symon Sadik has acted wonderfully, and Mahiya Mahi has adapted herself to the story beautifully." Shamim Ahamed Roni's production has to be praised, all in all 'Live' is the story of the people around our society which many hide.' Deepu Baul wrote on Facebook, 'Undoubtedly, this is one of the best works by Symon, Mahi, Ador Azad and of course director Shamim Ahamed Roni. Shiba Shanu has also acted quite fluently outside the negative character. All in all, no moment of the film will let you lose focus. But there is only one regret - such a good work was released without any promotion. Shiba Shanu's performance has also been praised by many. Rahman Moti wrote in Bangla Film Group, "Live" will be a film of a different character in the entire career of "Shiba Shanu".

Daily Janakantha wrote that "The teaser of his new movie 'Live' was released on Friday (August 19). This heroine is the main attraction of the teaser full of mystery-thriller. The teaser suggests that the story of the movie revolves around a murder incident. The police investigate and find various mysteries. Many unknown events come out. Mahi's performance in this is appreciated by the audience. Some say, Mahiya Mahi Apu is amazing, some say, I saw only Mahi Apu throughout the teaser. She is just wow, another viewer commented, Mahiya Mahi Apu Chamak Dilo".

Zoom Bangla News wrote that "The teaser of the much awaited 'Live' movie came on YouTube last Friday; Which is being appreciated by the audience".
