= Ananda TV =

Bengali television channel

Ananda TV আনন্দ টিভি
- Country: Bangladesh
- Broadcast area: Nationwide
- Headquarters: Banani, Dhaka

Programming
- Language: Bengali
- Picture format: 576i SDTV

Ownership
- Owner: ATV Limited
- Key people: Hasan Taufique Abbas (chairman)

History
- Launched: 11 March 2018; 8 years ago
- Founder: Abbas Ullah Shikder

Links
- Website: anandatv.tv

Availability

Streaming media
- Jagobd: www.jagobd.com/anandatv

Ananda TV (Bengali: আনন্দ টিভি [anond̪o]; lit. 'joy TV'), also known by its acronym ATV (Bengali: এটিভি), is a Bangladeshi Bengali-language privately owned satellite and cable television channel headquartered in the Chairman Bari neighborhood of Banani in Dhaka, which commenced official transmissions on 11 March 2018 with the "Hridoyer Kotha Bole" (হৃদয়ের কথা বলে; lit. 'Tells the sayings of the heart') slogan. The channel's programming consists of both news and entertainment.

== History ==
Ananda TV was initially licensed as 'ATV' by the Bangladesh Telecommunication Regulatory Commission in November 2013. Its frequency allocation was granted in January 2015. Due to financial issues and mismanagement, the launch of the channel was delayed for a long time. Ananda TV commenced test transmissions on 24 January 2018. Later, they were allowed to officially commence transmissions on 14 February 2018.

A press conference regarding the launch of the channel was held in its headquarters on 10 March. Later, Ananda TV officially began broadcasting the following day, with a launch ceremony held. It also claimed to aim to showcase the Bengali culture and heritage to audiences by the spirit of the liberation war.

The channel's founder was Abbas Ullah Shikder, the producer of the popular 1989 Bangladeshi film, Beder Meye Josna, who later died on 18 January 2020. Others present at the launch ceremony were the Minister of Information Hasanul Haq Inu, Ananda TV's former chairman Hasan Taufique Abbas, and former managing director Nurul Islam. The channel began broadcasting via the Bangabandhu-1 satellite in 2019.

On 21 August 2021, the building where Ananda TV is based in caught on fire. On 28 August 2025, the chairman of Ananda TV, Hasan Taufique Abbas, was arrested at the Hazrat Shahjalal International Airport in a fraud case filed by the channel's former managing director Nurul Islam in 2023.
