= Ji Hujur =

- Film poster
- Directed by: Jakir Hossain Raju
- Written by: Jakir Hossain Raju
- Produced by: Abbas Ullah Shikder
- Starring: Symon Sadik; Sara Zerin; Jemi; Anan; Kazi Hayat; Abbas Ulllah Shikder; Nasrin; Anamika
- Cinematography: Hasan Ahmed
- Edited by: Towhid Hossain Chowdhury
- Music by: Ali Akram Shuvo; Azad Mintu
- Production company: Anandamela Cholocchitro Limited.
- Distributed by: Anandamela Cholocchitro Limited.
- Release date: 13 April 2012
- Country: Bangladesh
- Language: Bengali

Ji Hujur (Bengali: জ্বী হুজুর) is a Bangladeshi Bengali-language Drama film. It was directed by Jakir Hossain Raju. It stars Symon Sadik, Sara Zerin, Jemi, Anan, Kazi Hayat, Abbas Ullah Shikder, Nasrin, and Anamika. This film was the debut film of Symon Sadik and Sara Zerin.

== Plot ==
Its story is about a simple and pious young and religious person named Abdur Rahman (Symon Sadik) who comes to Dhaka to a relative's home for a job. Here he meets with a cunning girl named Bunty (Sara Zerin). The story takes a twist as Bunty begins to love Abdur Rahman, and he starts to chase a team of gangsters.

== Cast ==
- Symon Sadik as Abdur Rahman
- Sara Zerin as Bunty
- Jemi as S I faruq ( Police Officer )
- Anan as Runa ( S I faruq's Girl Friend )
- Kazi Hayat as police commissioner
- Dolly Zohur as Mrs. Haque (Bunty's Mother)
- Abbas Ullah Sikdar as haque Saheb (Bunty's father)
- Lina Ferdousy as Abdur Rahman's mother
- Nasrin as Item Girl
- Anamika as bably (Bunty's sister)
- Roton as Bodor (Police)
- Chikon Ali as Kader (Police)
- Mahtab as Kana Manik
- Joy as Child Artist
- Pina

== Music ==
Ji Hujur

Soundtrack album by Andru Kishor Konok Chapa Monir Khan Mehrin Roma
- Released: 2012 (Bangladesh)
- Recorded: 2011
- Genre: Films Sound Track
- Length: 22 minutes
- Label: AnandaMela Cholocchitro Ltd.
- Producer: Md. AbbasUllah Sikdar

No.	Title	Singer(s)	Length
1.	"Don't disturb me"	Mehrin	4:13
2.	"chintaa koro (item Song)"	Roma	4:15
3.	"Chand hoye Toke ami dakbo"	Monir Khan, Konok Chapa	4:00
4.	"Morechi Morechi Ami"	Konok Chapa, Andru Kishor	4:50
5.	"Keno Elo Eto Prem"	Konok Chapa	4:48
