= Anisur Rahman Milon =

Bangladeshi actor

- আনিসুর রহমান মিলন
- Occupations: Actor, producer, television presenter
- Spouses: Lucy Gomez (m. 1999; div. 2013); Polee Ahmed (died 2022)

Anisur Rahman Milon is a Bangladeshi actor. He is a co-president of the Actors Equity.

Milon was the first Bangladeshi actor to become a member of Screen Actors Guild, the American labor union of film and television principal and background performers worldwide.

== Career ==
Milon began his acting career at age 12 with Artonad Theater. Then he acted in TV series Ronger Manush, directed by Salauddin Lavlu. He appeared in the 2008 film The Last Thakur. Milon also played a lead role in the 2007 NTV series 111: A Nelson Number.

On 28 January 2022, Milon became a co-president of the Actors Equity after receiving 398 votes.

== Personal life ==
Milon was first married to actress Lucy Gomez during 1999–2013. His second wife, Polee Ahmed, died from cancer in 2022.

== Filmography ==
Key
†	Denotes films that have not yet been released

Year	Film	Role	Director	Notes
2005	Hajar Bachhor Dhore	Karim Sheikh	Kohinur Akter Suchanda	Debut film
2008	The Last Thakur	Tarun	Sadik Ahmed	
2013	Dehorokkhi	Aslam	Iftakar Chowdhury	
2013	PoraMon	Inspector Abid	Jakir Hossain Raju	
2014	Onek Sadher Moyna	Mona	Jakir Hossain Raju	
2014	Prem Korbo Tomar Sathe	Sangram	Rakibul Alam Rakib	
2015	Bhalobasha Simahin	Inspector Milon	Shah Alam Mondal	
2015	Blackmail	Romeo	Anonno Mamun	
2015	Bhalobasar Golpo	Masum	Anonno Mamun	
2015	Lalchor	Ratan	Nader Chowdhury	
2016	One Way	Milon	Iftakar Chowdhury	
2017	Crime Road	Raju	Saimon Tarique	
2017	Hunger & Love: Tobu O Bhalobasha	Abul	Swapan Ahmed	
2017	Rajneeti	Shakil Habibullah	Bulbul Biswas	
2018	Alta Banu	Sohel Rana	Arun Chowdhury	
2018	Shopner Ghor	Shimanto	Taneem Rahman Angshu	
2018	Bizli	Himself	Iftakar Chowdhury	Cameo appearance
2019	Ratrir Jatri	Ashik	Habibul Islam Habib	
2019	Dongiri	Tomal	Shah Alam Mondal	
2019	Indubala	Montu	Joy Sarkar	
2020	Chol Jai		Masuma Rahman Tani	
2021	August 1975	Constable Sirajul Haque	Selim Khan, Shamim Ahamed Roni	
2022	Mafia	Sukanta Ray	Touhid Hossain Chowdhury	
2023	MR-9: Do or Die	Dr. Karim / Kabir Chowdhury	Asif Akbar	
2024	Maya: The Love	Robin	Zakir Uddin Jashim	
2024	Dunia	Irfan	Saif Chandan	
TBA	Jamdani †	TBA	Anirudho Rasel	
TBA	Kathgoray Saratchandra †	Gohar	Arifur Zaman Arif	Based on the popular characters of Sarat Chandra Chattopadhyay selected from his four novels namely Grihadaha, Devdas, Srikanta and Boro Didi.
TBA	Jhoom †	TBA	Sumon Reza	
TBA	Naior †	TBA	Rashid Polash	
TBA	Target †	TBA	Saif Chandan	
TBA	Shoyachan Pakhi †	TBA	Shafiqul Islam Bhairabi	In post production since 2014 due to the death of the director
TBA	Nodir Jole Shapla Bhashe †	TBA	Mehedi Hasan	

== Television ==
Year	Title	Co-Artist	Director	Notes
2005	Romjier Ayna		Shihab Shaheen	
	Muloto Natoker Shuru Ekhan Theke			
	Er Por Golper Ki Hobey Janina	Jenny		
	Boi Pagol	Kushum Sikdar		
	Red Envelope	Orsha		
	Doita	Aupee Karim, Tinni		
	Shornokar	Farzana Chumki		
	Bishakhar Shakha Proshakha	Ani		
	Premer Master	Kusum Shikder		
	Cheating Master		Sanjit Sarkar	
2021	Beauty Boarding 1971	Nishat Priom	Abu Hayat Mahmud	

== Awards ==
- Uro CJFB Performance Award (2005)
- RTV CJFB Performance Award (2006)
- Meril Protham Alo Award for Best TV Actor (2006)
- RTV Star Award - Best Actor - Drama "Alashpur" (2017)

Year	Awards	Category	Film	Result
2013	Bioscope Borsho-sera	Best Supporting Film Actor	PoraMon	Won
