= Maya: The Love =

Bangladeshi romantic drama film

- Movie poster
- Directed by: Jasim Uddin Jakir
- Written by: Jasim Uddin Jakir
- Produced by: Alinur Ashik Bhuiyan
- Starring: Shobnom Bubly; Ziaul Roshan; Symon Sadik; Anisur Rahman Milon; Rimjim Orin
- Edited by: S M Tushar
- Production company: Brothers Films
- Distributed by: Brothers Films
- Release date: 11 April 2024
- Country: Bangladesh
- Language: Bengali

Maya: The Love is a 2024 Bangladeshi romantic drama film with screenplay, story and directing done by Jasim Uddin Jakir and produced by Alinur Ashik Bhuiyan under the banner of Brothers Production House. The film stars Shobnom Bubly, Ziaul Roshan, Symon Sadik, Anisur Rahman Milon, Rimjim Orin and others.

The film was edited by SM Tushar.

== Cast ==
- Shobnom Bubly as Madhubi "Madhu"
- Anisur Rahman Milon as Robin
- Ziaul Roshan as Sajib
- Symon Sadik as Arif
- Rimjim Orin
- Kazi Hayat as Sajib's father
- Mahamudul Hasan Mithu
- Chikon Ali as Romeo

== Production ==
The filming started on 6 February 2022 with a song, which was participated by Shobnom Bubly and Roshan. After the completion of first lot of the filming in Dhaka, the second was started on February 17, 2022, which was shot in Chittagong.

Then there was a setback with the filming of the final climax and some patchwork. The filming and dubbing of the film was completed after overcoming various complications in December 2023.

== Release ==
The film was released in 9 theatres on 11 April 2024 on the occasion of Eid al-Fitr 2024.
