= Mou Khan =

Bangladeshi film actress

- Born: 13 December 1994 (age 31); Dhaka, Bangladesh
- Education: MBA
- Occupation: Actress
- Years active: 2015–present

Mou Khan is a Bangladeshi actress who started her show business career as a model. She made her screen debut in the film Protishodher Agun (2019), co-starring Zayed Khan. She had previously worked in the films Bandhob and Bahaduri, but the third film in which she worked was the first released.

She worked with director Montazur Rahman Akbar in three films: Omanush holo Manush, Jemon Jamai Temon Bou, and Banglar Hercules with the co-artist Monowar Hossain Dipjol. She also worked with director Shaheen Sumon in the web film Mafia.

== Early life ==
Mou born on 13 December 1994 in Dhaka.

== Filmography ==
=== Film ===
Key
†	Denotes films that have not yet been released

Year	Film	Role	Notes	Ref.
2019	Protishodher Agun		Debut film	(Note: multiple sources:)
2022	Mafia			(Note: multiple sources:)
2024	Omanush Holo Manush	Maya		(Note: multiple sources:)
2025	Bandhob			(Note: multiple sources:)
2026	Abar Hothat Brishti			
2026	Sneher Bandhan			
TBA	Bahaduri †	TBA	post production	(Note: multiple sources:)
TBA	Jemon Jamai Temon Bou †	TBA	Filming	
TBA	Tobu Prem Dami †	TBA	Filming	(Note: multiple sources:)
TBA	Banglar Hercules †	TBA	Filming	
TBA	Jolchi Ami †	TBA	Filming	
TBA	Prem Kabbo †	TBA	Announced	
TBA	Child of the Station †	TBA	Filming	
