= Saberi Alam =

Bangladeshi film actress

- সাবেরি আলম
- Born: 12 September 1968 (age 58)
- Occupations: TV and film actress
- Years active: 1979-present
- Notable work: Madhumati
- Awards: Anannya Top Ten Awards (2016)

Saberi Alam (born 12 September) is a Bangladeshi TV and film actress. She is best known for her performances in Madhumati (2011), Basundhara (2017) and Rajneeti (2017).

== Career ==
Saberi started her career in 1979 in Bangladeshi theatres. Later, she acted in many theatre shows. She became a popular TV actress in 1990s, but took a hiatus for marriage. After 13 years, she returned on-screen with TV serial Dolls' House in 2007.

She received a 2016 Anannya Top Ten Awards for her contribution to acting.

== Works ==
=== Film ===
- Madhumati (2011)
- Atmodan (2012)
- Rina Brown (2017)
- Rajneeti (2017)
- Ekti Cinemar Golpo (2018)
- Jodi Ekdin (2019)
- Moner Moto Manush Pailam Naa (2019)
- Bidrohi (2020)
- Bikkhov (2021)
- Agamikal (2022)
- Live (2022)
- Bubujaan (2023)
- Shesh Bazi (2024)
- The Difficult Bride (2026)

=== Television ===
- Gronthikgon Kohey, Belowari
- Doll's House (2007)
- Astey Astey (2007)
- Swapnamangal (2008)
- Mukhosh (2008), Fatima
- Akjon Maa ebong poroborti golpo (2008), Hashi
- Ekjon Durbal Manush (2008)
- Karo Kono Neeti Nai (2009)
- Gent's Tailor (2010)
- Jolkona (2010)
- Gorbhodharini (2010)
- Ghorar dim (2010)
- Naame Naame Chokkor (talk show)
- Breaking News (2010)
- Shimanto (2010)
- Tobuo Jibon (2013)
- Pocket Bhora Shoishob (2013)
- Hoyto Tobuo Bhalobasha (2013)
- Batighor (2013)
- Chupkotha (2014)
- Punyo (2014)
- Chondraboti (2014)
- U-Turn (2014)
- Sei Saat Din (2014)
- Surprise (2015)
- Jhaalmuri (2015)
- Pagla Hawar Din (2016)
- Chheleti Bhishon Careless Chhilo (2016)
- Home Theatre (2017)
- Mukhosh (2017), Fatima
- Lamp-post (2017)
- Chheya (2017)
- Kagojer Phul (2017)
- Dampotyo (2017)
- Sonar Shikol (2017)
- Shunnotai (2017)
- Ghore Baire (2018)
- Sonar Shekol (2018)
- Mayer Sheba (2022)
- Tomader Golpo (2025)
- Tomader Golpo 2 (2026)

== Personal life ==
Her younger brother Ahir Alam also worked in television. He died in a road traffic accident on 11 September 2001 at 30 years old. Saberi has a son who was born in 2001.

Her husband's name is Nadim. Her father died 2 days after she got married. Her mother Ava Alam died on November 21, 1976 at 29 years old. Ava Alam received Ekushey Padak before passing away.
