= Shiba Shanu =

Bangladeshi actor

- শিবা শানু
- Born: Chowdhury Mazhar Ali; 7 August 1970 (age 56); Dhaka, Bangladesh
- Occupation: Actor
- Years active: 1998–present
- Height: 6 ft 4 in (193 cm)
- Political party: BNP

Chowdhury Mazhar Ali (born: 7 August 1970; Popularly known as Shiba Shanu) is a Bangladeshi actor. He is mostly known for his villain role in Cinema of Bangladesh. In 1998, He started his film career as an actor with the film Matrivumi. His notable works as an actor are Commando, Tungiparar Miya Bhai, Bir, Abbas, Password, Naqaab, Captain Khan, Chalbaaz, Rangbaz, Premi O Premi, Rajneeti, Mental, Shikari, and Warning.

He is the current president of the Bangladesh Film Artistes Association, the organisation of local film artists.

== Career ==
In 1998, Shanu made his debut in the film industry with the film Matribhoomi. In 2023, he played as Shakib Khan's elder brother with a cameo appearance in Himel Ashraf's tragic romance Priyotoma, which became the highest grossing Bangladeshi film of all-time.

== Filmography ==
- Moynar Char (2026)
- Priyotoma (2023) as Sujon
- Local (2023)
- Bubujaan (2023) as Sikandar Pathaan
- Live (2022) as DB officer Mohammad Yunus
- Mafia (2022) as Mohor Ali
- Bikkhov (2021)
- Commando (2021) (cancel project)
- Tungiparar Miya Bhai (2021)
- Bir (2020)
- Abbas (2019)
- Password 2019
- Naqaab 2018
- Captain Khan 2018
- Chalbaaz 2018
- Mayabiny 2017
- Rangbaz 2017
- Rajneeti 2017
- Mental (2016)
- Shikari 2016
- Dhumketu 2016
- Warning – 2015
- Dui Prithibi - 2015
- Agnee - 2014
- Hitman – 2014
- Hero: The Superstar – 2014
- Full & Final – 2013
- Don Number One – 2012
- Bhalobasar Rong – 2012
- Bazarer Coolie – 2012
- Boss Number One – 2011
- Moner Jala – 2011
- Matir Thikana – 201
- Wanted – 2011
- Mayer Chokh – 2010
- Nissash Amar Tumi – 2010
- Top Hero – 2010
- Chehara: Vondo-2 – 2010
- Mayer Chokh – 2010
- Ma Amar Jaan – 2010
- Amar Buker Moddhokhane – 2010
- Ek Joban – 2010
- Amar Shopno Amar Sangshar – 2010
- Riksawalar Chele – 2010
- Rokto Chosa – 2010
- Jekhane Tumi Sekhane Ami – 2010
- Jiboner Cheye Dami – 2009
- Mon Boshena Porar Tebile – 2009
- Ke Ami – 2009
- Ainer Hate Greftar – 2009
- Rastar Chele – 2009
- Sobar Upore Tumi – 2009
- Mon Jekhane Ridoy Sekhane – 2009
- Bia Bari – 2009
- Prem Koyedi – 2009
- Bhalobashar Lal Golap – 2009
- Piriter Agun Jole Agun – 2009
- Mon Diasi Tomake – 2009
- Bhalobasha Dibi Kina Bol – 2009
- Kajer Manush – 2009
- Chirodini Tumi Je – 2009
- Mone Boro Kosto – 2009
- Mayer Hate Behester Chabi – 2009
- Jibon Nia Juddhor – 2009
- O Sathi Re – 2009
- Boro Vai Jindabad – 2008
- Tumi Amar Prem – 2008
- Rajdhanir Raja – 2008
- Tip Tip Brishty – 2008
- Choto BOn – 2008)
- Baba Amar Baba – 2008
- Swami Nia Juddho – 2008
- Ek Takar Bou – 2008
- Chokkor – 2007
- Lal Sobuj – 2005
- Ajker Samaj – 2004
- Vaiya – 2003
- Rongbaz Badsha – 2001
- Moger Mulluk – 1999
- Matrivumi – 1998

=== Television ===
- Gulshan Avenue Season 2
- USB (United States of Barishal)
- Chokkor E Bokkor
- Bhalobasha Emoni with Zaher Alvi and Iffat Ara Tithi
- Daroga
- Bini Sutor Prem
- Kosom
- Kobitay Prem
- Garments Joddha
- Probashir Khushi
- Tiger
- Launch E Biye
- Bekar Bhalobasha
- Chhaya
- Kusti Family
- Joler Prem

=== Web Series ===
- Black Money (2025) - Badol Commissioner (Bongo BD)
