= Shamim Ahamed Roni =

Bangladeshi film director (born 1986)

- শামীম আহমেদ রনি
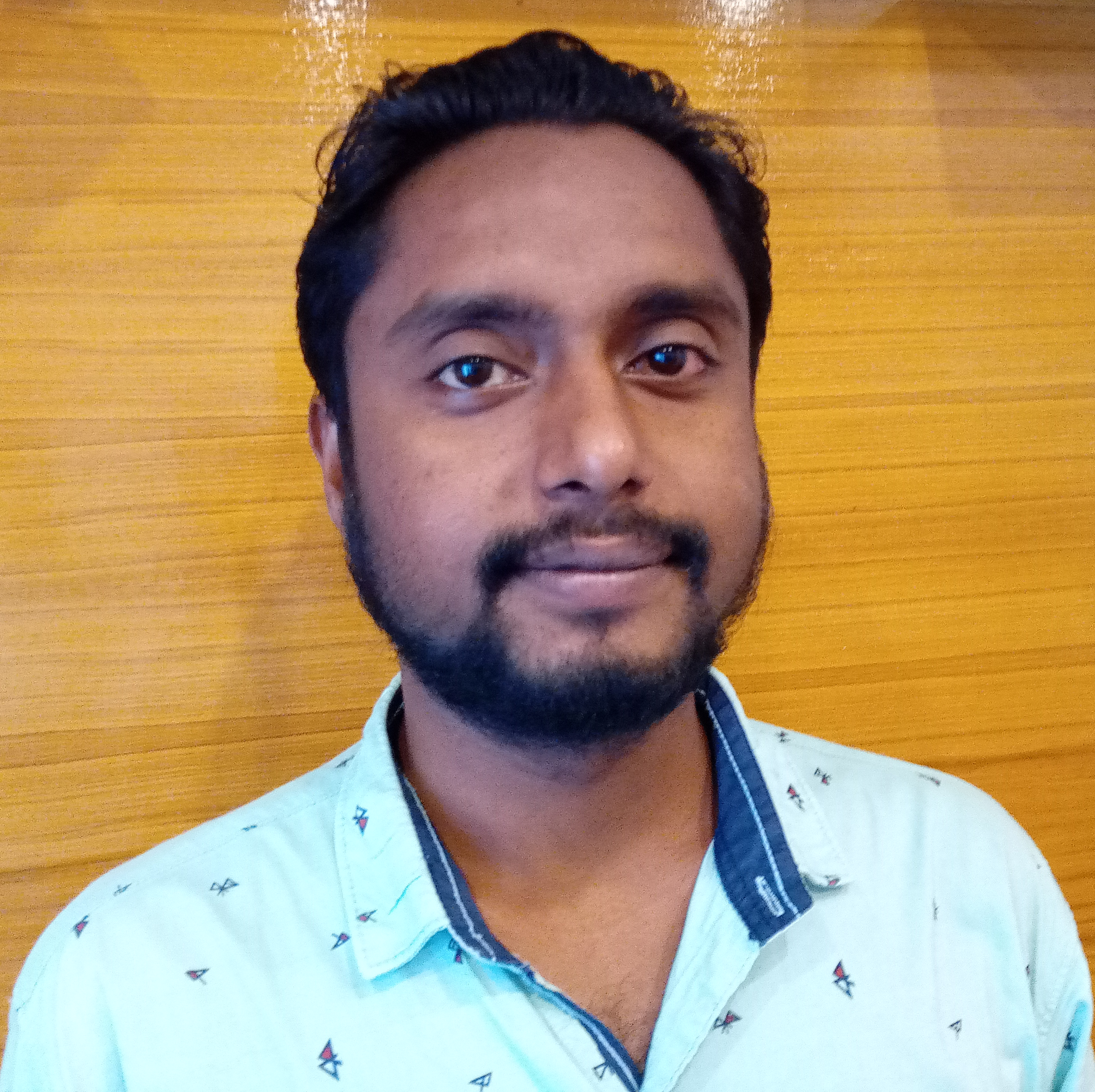
- Roni in 2020
- Born: 24 October 1986 (age 39)
- Education: Stamford University Bangladesh
- Occupations: Film director, screenwriter
- Years active: 2014–present
- Notable work: Bossgiri; Mental; Dhat Teri Ki; Shahenshah

Shamim Ahamed Roni (Bengali: শামীম আহমেদ রনি; born 24 October 1986) is a Bangladeshi film director and screenwriter who works in Dhallywood cinema. He debuted with the action-thriller film Mental (2016). (Note: multiple sources:)

== Career ==
The first film directed by Roni is Mental, which was released on 2016. In addition to directing the film, Roni wrote the screenplay. The young director made his directorial debut at BFDC through this film.

== Filmography ==
Key
†	Denotes films that have not yet been released

Year	Films	Director	Screenplay	Story	Notes	Ref.
2016	Mental	Yes	Yes	No	Directorial debut film	
2016	Bossgiri	Yes	No	No		
2017	Dhat Teri Ki	Yes	No	No		
2017	Rangbaz	Yes	Yes	No		
2020	Shahenshah	Yes	Yes	No		
2021	August 1975	Yes	Yes	Yes		
2021	Tungiparar Miya Bhai	Yes	Yes	Yes		
2022	Live	Yes	Yes	Yes		
2022	Bikkhov	Yes	Yes	No		
2023	Bubujaan	Yes	Yes	No		
