= Shobnom Bubly =

Bangladeshi actress and news presenter

- শবনম বুবলী
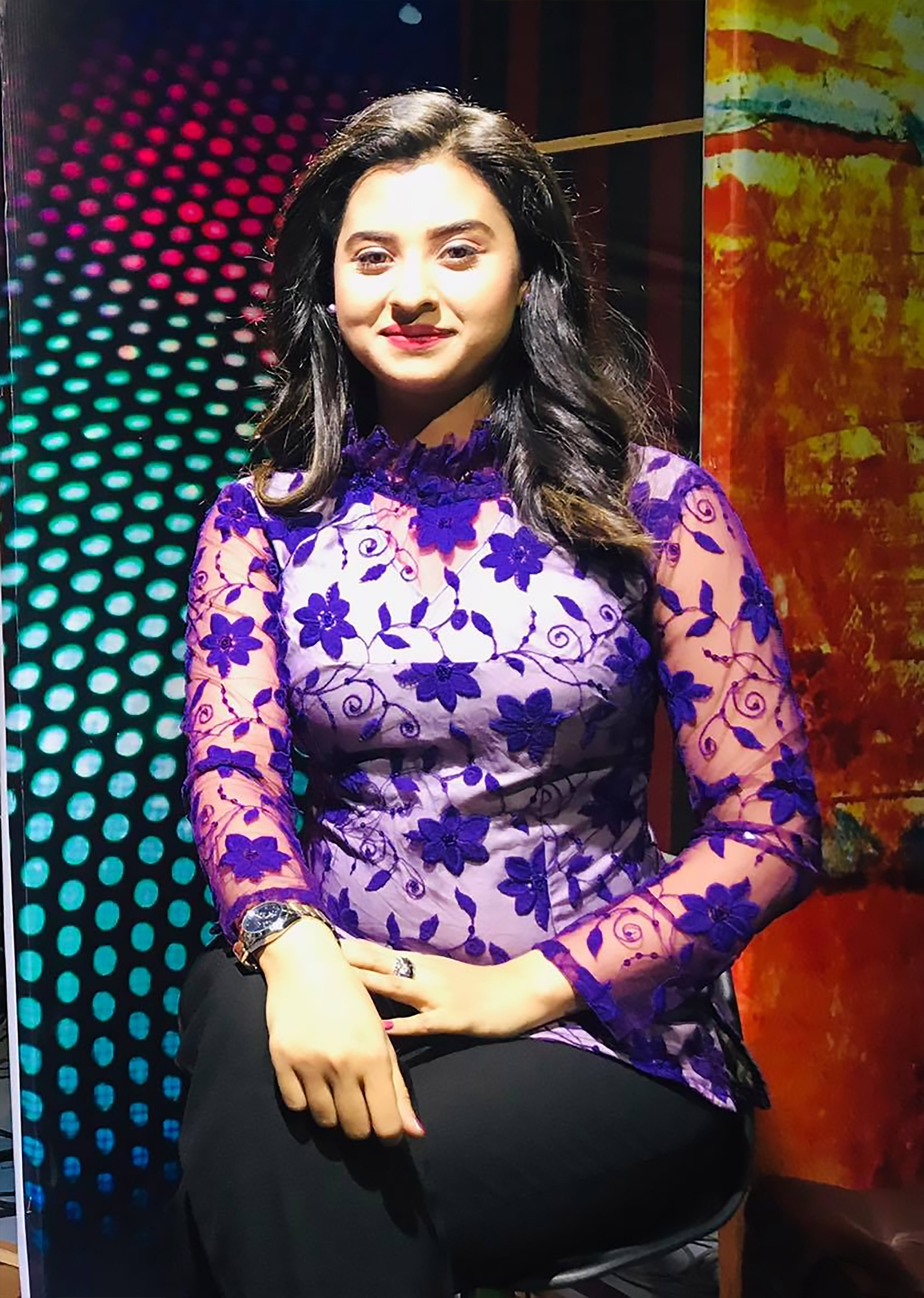
- Born: Shobnom Yeasmin Bubly; November 20, 1989 (age 36); Dhaka, Bangladesh
- Education: National University of Bangladesh
- Occupations: Actress; News presenter
- Years active: 2013–present
- Spouse: Shakib Khan (m. 2018; sep. 2022)
- Children: Shehzad Khan Bir; Sharlin Khan
- Awards: Meril Prothom Alo Award

Shobnom Yeasmin Bubly (born 20 November 1989), professionally known as Shobnom Bubly, is a Bangladeshi film actress and former news presenter. (Note: multiple sources:) Bubly is mostly known for her marriage with Shakib Khan opposite whom she made her acting debut in the film Bossgiri in 2016 and since then the two have collaborated multiple times. (Note: multiple sources:)

== Early life ==
Bubly was born on 20 November 1989 in Dhaka, Bangladesh, but her family's ancestral home is in the Sonaimuri Upazila of Noakhali district. She is the third of four children. Her father is a retired Armed Police (APBN) Officer, and her mother is a housewife. One of her elder sisters, Nazmin Mimi, is a playback singer and the other one, Sharmin Sweety, is a former news presenter. Her only brother, Jahid Hasan Akash, is a student.

Bubly completed her bachelor's in economics from National University and was also reportedly enrolled in an evening MBA program at the Dhaka University. Inspired by her elder sister's stint as a news presenter, she auditioned for the Banglavision Television channel and was selected as a news anchor in 2013.

== Career ==
In 2013, Bubly began her career as a news presenter for the Bangladeshi private entertainment television channel Bangla vision. She eventually became interested in acting and debuted with the film Bossgiri with Shakib Khan.

== Personal life ==
In 2016, Shakib Khan and Bubly were rumored to be dating while shooting for the film Bossgiri. There were strong rumours that they were married, but it was unconfirmed at the time. On 30 September 2022, Khan and Bubly both confirmed on their social media accounts that they had been married since July 20, 2018. Together they have a son named Shehzad Khan Bir who was born on 21 March 2020, in the United States.

== Filmography ==
Key
†	Denotes films that have not yet been released

Year	Film	Role	Notes	Ref.
2016	Bossgiri	Bubly	Debut film	
2016	Shooter	Labanya		
2017	Rangbaz	Bubly		
2017	Ohongkar	Maya		
2018	Chittagainga Powa Noakhailla Maiya	Rani		
2018	Super Hero	Sima		
2018	Captain Khan	Riya		
2019	Password	Dr. Shabnom		
2019	Moner Moto Manush Pailam Naa	Sultana Haque "Arpita"		
2020	Bir	Rehana		
2021	Chokh	Rezni		
2022	Taan	Aboni	Released on Chorki	
2022	Floor Number 7	Aboni	Released on Chorki	
2022	Bidrohi	Mati		
2022	Talash	Naira		
2023	Leader: Amie Bangladesh	Mila Chowdhury		
2023	Local	Rupali		
2023	Casino	Ariana		
2023	Prohelika	Arpa		
2024	Maya: The Love	Madhubi "Madhu"		
2024	Deyaler Desh	Nohor		
2024	Revenge	Inspector Shoma		
2025	Jongli	Dr. Tithi		
2025	Chhaya	Barrister Srabani Ahmed	Released on iScreen	
2026	Pressure Cooker	Azmery Shiekh		
2026	Sardar Barir Khela	Tarulata		
2026	Pinik			
TBA	Shapla Shaluk†	TBA	Completed	
TBA	Flashback	Sweta		
TBA	Chador †	TBA	Filming	
TBA	Dhakaiya Devdas †	TBA	Filming	

=== Music video ===
Year	Song(s)	Singer(s)	Cast	Ref.
2025	"Moyna"	Konal and Niloy	Sharaf Ahmed Zibon	

== Awards ==
=== Meril Prothom Alo Awards ===
Year	Film	Category	Results
2016	Bossgiri	Best New Performer (Film and Television)	Won

=== Channel i Digital Media Award ===
Year	Film	Category	Results
2020	Bossgiri	Best Actress (Film)	Won

=== Iconic Star Awards ===
Year	Film	Category	Results
2021	—N/a	Best Actress (Film)	Won

=== The Daily Star OTT & Digital Content Awards ===
Year	Film	Category	Result	Ref.
2023	Taan	Best OTT Actress	Nominated	

=== BFDA Awards ===
Year	Film	Category	Result	Ref.
2023	Prohelika	Best Film Actress	Won	
