= Jakir Hossain Raju =

Bangladeshi film director

- জাকির হোসেন রাজু
- Education: University of Dhaka
- Occupations: Film director, writer
- Years active: 1993–present
- Awards: full list

Jakir Hossain Raju is a Bangladeshi film director. Besides film-making, he is also a story writer, screenplay and dialogue writer. He won three National Film Awards for the films Bhalobaslei Ghor Bandha Jay Na (2010) and Moner Moto Manush Pailam Na (2019).

== Life ==
Jakir was educated in journalism at the University of Dhaka. In 2024, he became a member of the Bangladesh Films Certificate Board.

== Filmography ==
Year	Film	Director	Story	Screenplay	Dialogue	Notes
1996	Jibon Songshar	Yes	Yes	Yes	Yes	Directorial Debut Film
1999	E Jibon Tomar Amar	Yes	Yes			
2001	Milon Hobe Koto Dine	Yes	Yes	Yes	Yes	
2001	Nisshase Tumi Bisshase Tumi	Yes	Yes	Yes	Yes	
2001	Bhalobasha Kare Koy	Yes	Yes	Yes	Yes	
2007	Ma Amar Swargo	Yes		Yes	Yes	
2007	Shamir Sangshar	Yes		Yes	Yes	
2008	Mone Prane Acho Tumi	Yes		Yes	Yes	
2009	Amar Praner Priya	Yes		Yes		
2010	Bhalobaslei Ghor Bandha Jay Na	Yes	Yes	Yes	Yes	Won: National Film Awards Best screenplay and best dialogue writer Won: Bachsas Film Awards Best screenplay and best dialogue writer
2012	Ji Hujur	Yes	Yes	Yes	Yes	
2013	PoraMon	Yes		Yes		
2013	Er Beshi Bhalobasha Jay Na	Yes		Yes		
2014	Dobir Saheber Songsar	Yes		Yes		
2014	Onek Sadher Moyna	Yes		Yes	Yes	
2016	Onek Dame Kena	Yes		Yes		
2016	Niyoti	Yes				Indo-Bangladesh joint production
2017	Premi O Premi	Yes				The film was inspired from Hollywood movie Leap Year; stars Arifin Shuvoo and Nusraat Faria.
2018	Bhalo Theko	Yes	Yes	Yes	Yes	
2019	Moner Moto Manush Pailam Naa	Yes	Yes	Yes	Yes	
TBA	Artonad†	Yes				
TBA	Chador†	Yes				

== Awards ==
Year	Award	Category	Film	Results
2012	National Film Awards	Best story writer	Bhalobaslei Ghor Bandha Jay Na (2010)	Won
2012	National Film Awards	Best dialogue writer	Bhalobaslei Ghor Bandha Jay Na (2010)	Won
2014	Bachsas Film Awards	Best Screenwriter	Bhalobaslei Ghor Bandha Jay Na (2010)	Won
2014	Bachsas Film Awards	Best dialogue writer	Bhalobaslei Ghor Bandha Jay Na (2010)	Won

== See also ==
- Bangladesh National Film Award for Best Story
- Bangladesh National Film Award for Best Dialogue
