= Bangladesh Film Development Corporation =

Government-owned film organisation

- বাংলাদেশ চলচ্চিত্র উন্নয়ন কর্পোরেশন
- Seal of BFDC
- Nickname: BFDC
- Formation: 1959; 67 years ago
- Headquarters: Dhaka, Bangladesh
- Coordinates: 23°45′09″N 90°23′53″E
- Region served: Bangladesh
- Official language: Bengali
- Website: fdc.gov.bd
- Formerly called: East Pakistan Film Development Corporation

Bangladesh Film Development Corporation (BFDC) is a government owned and operated corporation in Tejgaon, Dhaka, Bangladesh. Masuma Rahman Tani is the current managing director of the corporation.

== History ==
The organization was founded in 1959 as the East Pakistan Film Development Corporation which was changed to Bangladesh Film Development Corporation after Bangladesh achieved independence in 1971. It signed an agreement with National Film Development Corporation of India in 2016 to jointly produce a documentary on Bangladesh Liberation war. It has faced criticism on mismanagement and waste of public funds. On 3 April each year the National Film day of Bangladesh is observed, the day is organized and celebrated by the corporation. The day marks the occasion when Sheikh Mujibur Rahman then Minister of Industries and Commerce of East Pakistan introduced the bill to formulate the East Pakistan Film development corporation.
