= Emon Saha =

Bangladeshi composer

Emon Saha ইমন সাহা
- Genres: film score, techno, fusion, folk, pop
- Occupations: Music director, composer, record producer, singer
- Instruments: keyboards, vocals, guitar
- Years active: 2000–present
- Labels: Sangeeta, Ektaar, Laser Vision, Deadline music

Emon Saha is a Bangladeshi composer, musician and singer. He earned 7 Bangladesh National Film Awards for his music composition and direction in the films Chandragrohon (2008), Kusum Kusum Prem (2011), Ghetuputra Komola (2012), Pita (2012), Meyeti Ekhon Kothay Jabe (2016), Jannat (2018), and his directorial debut film is Silence: A Musical Journey (2025).

== Early life ==
Emon Saha was born on October 16 in Dhaka. He is the son of the Bangladesh National Film Award winning musician Satya Saha, and his mother's name is Ramola Saha. Emon Saha’s ancestral home is the Nandirhat Zamindar Bari, located in the Nandirhat area of Uttar Fateyabad under Hathazari Thana, Chattogram. He first took his Hindustani Classical Sangeet training from Satindra Nath Halder. He also learned from his father and Academy Award-winning music composer A.R. Rahman's KM Music Conservatory.

== Works ==
As Filmmaker

Year	Film	Director	Story	Producer	Notes	Ref.
2025	Silence: A Musical Journey	Yes	Yes	Yes	Directorial debut film	

Film playback songs

- Shoshur Bari Zindabad (2001)
- Khairun Shundori (2003)
- Chandragrohon (2008)
- Kusum Kusum Prem (2011)
- Ghetuputra Komola (2012)
- Pita (2012)
- Alpo Alpo Prem-er Golpo (2013)
- Antaranga
- Brihonnola (2013)
- Mon Joley
- Desha: The Leader (2014)
- Agnee 2 (2015)
- Kartoos (2015)
- Ananda Ashru (upcoming) as composer

== Awards ==
Year	Award	Film/Song	Result	Ref.
2008	Bangladesh National Film Award for Best Music Composer	Chandragrohon	Won	
2011	Bangladesh National Film Award for Best Music Director	Kusum Kusum Prem	Won	
2012	Bangladesh National Film Award for Best Music Director	Ghetuputra Komola	Won	
2012	Bangladesh National Film Award for Best Composer	Pita	Won	
2016	Bangladesh National Film Award for Best Music Director; Bangladesh National Film Award for Best Composer	Meyeti Ekhon Kothay Jabe	Won	
2018	Bangladesh National Film Award for Best Music Director	Jannat	Won	
2022	BFDA Awards 2022-23		Won	
