= Bangladesh Film Certification Board =

Censorship regulatory agency of Bangladesh

- Abbreviation: BFCB
- Predecessor: Bangladesh Film Censor Board
- Formation: 2024
- Headquarters: Dhaka, Bangladesh
- Region served: Bangladesh
- Official language: Bengali
- Website: www.bfcb.gov.bd

The Bangladesh Film Censor Board is a regulatory agency that is responsible for the censorship of films and is located in Dhaka, Bangladesh.

== Predecessor ==
The Bangladesh Film Censor Board board was set up in 1977 following the framing of Bangladesh Censorship of Film Rules. The agency is responsible for the censorship of locally produced movies and foreign imports, and acts as the registrar of film clubs in Bangladesh. Martuza Ahmed, the secretary of the Ministry of Information, is the ex-officio chairman of the board. In 2015, the board blocked My Bicycle, the first film in the Chakma language (a minority language) in Bangladesh. It also blocked a movie about the Rana Plaza building collapse in which more than a thousand garment workers died. Another movie was banned in which the villain wore a Mujib coat, a style associated with the founding president of Bangladesh, Sheikh Mujib.
