= Touhid Hossain Chowdhury =

Bangladeshi film editor

- তৌহিদ হোসেন চৌধুরী
- Occupation: Film editor
- Years active: 2001–present
- Notable work: Desha: The Leader
- Awards: National Film Award (1st time)

Touhid Hossain Chowdhury is a Bangladeshi film editor. He won Bangladesh National Film Award for Best Editing for the film Desha: The Leader (2014)

== Selected films ==
- Nishwase Tumi Biswase Tumi – 2001
- Milon Hobe Koto Dine – 2001
- Bhalobasha Karey Koy – 2002
- Big Boss – 2003
- Dui Bodhu Ek Swami – 2003
- Bou Shashurir Juddho – 2003
- Bachao – 2003
- Jiboner Gurranty Nai – 2004
- Vondo Neta – 2004
- Heera Amar Naam – 2005
- Dui Noyoner Alo – 2005
- Badha – 2005
- System – 2006
- Koti Takar Kabin – 2006
- Sabdhan Sontrasi – 2006
- Dushmon Khotom – 2006
- Nishidhdho Prem – 2007
- Akkel Alir Nirbachon – 2008
- Akash Chhoa Bhalobasa – 2008
- Tumi Kato Sundor – 2008
- Tumi Amar Swami – 2009
- Amar Praner Priya – 2009
- Bhalobaslei Ghor Bandha Jay Na – 2010
- Top Hero – 2010
- Bazarer Coolie – 2012
- Bhalobasar Rong – 2012
- Pora Mon – 2013
- Tobou Bhalobashi – 2013
- Purnodoirgho Prem Kahini – 2013
- Full & Final – 2013
- Fand: The Trap – 2014
- Hitman – 2014
- Ek Cup Cha – 2014
- Desha: The Leader – 2014
- Warning – 2015
- Action Jasmine −2015
- Aro Bhalobashbo Tomai – 2015
- Sweetheart – 2016
- Niyoti – 2016
- Rokto – 2016
- Sultana Bibiana – 2017
- Dhatteriki – 2017
- Rajneeti – 2017
- Rangbaaz – 2017
- Detective – 2018
- Daymukti;-2025
- Tosnos – (upcoming)

=== Director ===
- Mafia (2022)

== Awards and nominations ==
National Film Awards

Year	Award	Category	Film	Result
2014	National Film Award	Best Editing	Desha: The Leader	Won
