= Keka Ferdousi =

Bangladeshi television chef and author

- কেকা ফেরদৌসী
- Born: 4 August 1960 (age 65); Dhaka, East Pakistan, Pakistan
- Spouse: Abdul Mukit Majumder (m. 1980)
- Children: 2
- Mother: Rabeya Khatun
- Relatives: Faridur Reza Sagar (brother)

Keka Ferdousi (born 4 August 1960) is a Bangladeshi television chef and author.

== Early life ==
Ferdousi was born on 4 August 1960, in Dhaka to Fazlul Haque, a film producer, and Rabeya Khatun, an author. Her brother Faridur Reza Sagar is a film producer. Ferdousi began cooking in class five. In 1980, she moved to the United States. She returned to Bangladesh in 1984.

== Career ==
Ferdousi's first appearance on television was on Shykh Seraj's BTV show Mati O Manush in 1994, where she presented a mushroom recipe.

Ferdousi has since appeared in various cooking shows. She has also written multiple cookbooks and judged cooking programs in Bangladesh as well as abroad. She is currently the president of the Bangladesh Cooking Association and runs the cooking school Keka Ferdousir Rannaghar.

== Personal life ==
Ferdousi married Abdul Mukit Majumder since 1980, a businessman and member of the Bangladesh Freedom Fighters. He is the director of the Impress Group. They have a son and a daughter.

== Appearances ==
Cooking programs

- Desh Bideshe Ranna (Channel i)
- Monohor Iftar (Channel i)
- Je Radhe Se Chulo Badhe (Channel i)
- Mayer Hater Ranna (Channel i)
- Rannaghar (Zee Bangla) (In one episode)

As judge

- ACI Pure Sorishar Tel Anondo Alo Jatoyo Vorta Protijogita 2017 (Bangladesh)
- Tommy Mia International India Chef of the Year 2017 (UK)
- The Chef TV Reality Show 2017 (UK)
- Deko Food Limited Bou Sajano Protijogita 2019 (Bangladesh)

Music videos

- Beainshab (2016)

== Bibliography ==
- Diabeteser Mojar Ranna
- Microwave Ovene Ranna
- Sasto Sochaton Ranna
- Desh Bidesher Ranna
- Jhotpot Ranna
- Harano Diner Ranna
- Sonali Diner Ranna
- Thai, Chinese O Indian Ranna
- Mojadar Ranna
- Jhotpot Achar
- Rokomari Nasta

== Awards ==
- 2011, Gourmand World Cookbook Awards', from Paris, for Sasto Sochaton Ranna
- 2011, The British Curry Awards, special recognition category.

== See also ==
- Alpana Habib
