= Pavel Areen =

Bangladeshi composer

Pavel Areen পাভেল আরিন
- Born: Bangladeshi
- Genres: Folk; Classical; Rock
- Occupations: Drummer; Composer; Audio engineer
- Instruments: Drums; Keyboard; Percussion
- Years active: 2007–present
- Formerly of: Chirkutt

Pavel Areen (Bengali: পাভেল আরিন) is a Bangladeshi composer, sound engineer and Drummer he is best known as the former drummer of the rock band Chirkutt. He started his musical journey at a young age, performing at Shishu Academy and joining several bands. He learned sound engineering by himself and started creating jingles for television and radio. Pavel also built his own recording studio, contributing to projects such as Chirkutt's first album and various film scores. Pavel Areen was nominated for the Filmfare Awards East in the Best Background Score category for the film No Bed of Roses (Doob). Additionally, he won the Channel i Music Award in 2018 for his work as a sound engineer.

== Career ==
Pavel, career began with drumming performances at a very young age, progressing through various bands such as "Recall" and "Border". He became a member of the band Chirkutt. His studio work includes recording Chirkutt's first album and several other musical projects. Pavel continues to focus on his band and expanding his work as a sound engineer and music composer.

Pavel has worked on various television commercials, dramas, and films. He has worked with some directors in the Bangladeshi film industry, including Mostofa Sarwar Farooki, Amitabh Reza Chowdhury, Abdullah Mohammad Saad, Dhrubo Hasan, and Noor Imran Mithu. Some of his key projects include Ant Story (Piprabidya), Komola Rocket, Saturday Afternoon, No Bed of Roses (Doob), Jalaler Golpo, Ladies & Gentlemen, Television, Autobiography and Fatima.

== Discography ==
Films

Year	Film Title	Director	Ref
2012	Television	Mostofa Sarwar Farooki	
2013	Ant Story (Piprabidya)	Mostofa Sarwar Farooki	
2014	Jalaler Golpo	Abu Shahed Emon	
2017	No Bed of Roses (Doob)	Mostofa Sarwar Farooki	
2018	Komola Rocket	Noor Imran Mithu	
2019	Saturday Afternoon	Mostofa Sarwar Farooki	
2021	Ladies & Gentlemen	Mostofa Sarwar Farooki	
2023	Autobiography	Mostofa Sarwar Farooki	
2024	Fatima	Dhrubo Hasan	

Web Films

Year	Film Title	Director	Ref
2024	Last Defenders of Monogamy	Mostofa Sarwar Farooki	

TIME ZONE Living Room Session|Season 1

All songs were composed and rearranged by Pavel Areen.

No. overall	No. in season	Song Title	Singer(s)	Lyricist(s)	Composer(s)	Original release date
1	1	"Bhalobeshe Sokhi"	Dilshad Nahar Kona	Rabindranath Tagore	Pavel Areen	February 14, 2024
2	2	"Amay Joto Dukkho Dili Bondhure"	Kazal Dewan	Jalal Uddin Kha	Pavel Areen and "Amay Joto Dukkho Dili Bondhure" was originally composed by Jalal Uddin Kha.	March 1, 2024
3	3	"Hey Namaji"	Jahid Nirob "Hey Namaji" was originally artist by Abbasuddin Ahmed	Kazi Nazrul Islam	Pavel Areen "Hey Namaji" was originally composed by Kazi Nazrul Islam.	March 21, 2024
4	4	"Gole Male Pirit Koro Na"	Imran Mahmudul	Satishchandra Gosai	Pavel Areen "Gole Male Pirit Koro Na" was originally composed by Satishchandra Gosai.	April 10, 2024
5	5	"Mayer Anchol"	Innima Roshni	Moajjem Hossain	Pavel Areen "Mayer Anchol" was originally composed by Aleya Begum.	May 12, 2024
6	6	"Mon Tore"	Mujib Pardeshi	Saidul Islam Chowdhury	Pavel Areen "Mon Tore" was originally composed by Saidul Islam Chowdhury.	May 30, 2024
7	7	"Rongila"	Masha Islam	Dukhai Khandakar	Pavel Areen "Rongila" was originally composed by Sachin Deb Barman.	June 6, 2024
8	8	"Tumi Jaiona Bondhure"	Oyshee	Baul Abul Sarkar	Pavel Areen "Tumi Jaiona Bondhure" was originally composed by Baul Abul Sarkar.	June 13, 2024

== Awards ==
- Filmfare Awards East - 2018
- Channel i Music Award - 2018
