= List of Bangladeshi films of 2021 =

This is a list of Bangladeshi films that were scheduled to release in 2021. Some films have announced release dates but have yet to begin filming, while others are in production but do not yet have definite release dates. Films listed as "untitled" do not yet have publicly announced titles.

2021 saw the release of numerous notable films that were originally scheduled for release in 2020, but were postponed due to the COVID-19 pandemic, releasing theatrically, on video on demand or on streaming services.

== January–March ==
Opening		Title	Director	Cast	Studios	Ref.
F E B R U A R Y						
M A R C H	19	Alatchakra: 3D		Habibur Rahman (director); Jaya Ahsan, Ahmed Rubel	Mise En Scéne Productions	
M A R C H	19	Sphulingo		Tauquir Ahmed (director); Pori Moni, Zakia Bari Mamo, Shyamol Mowla, Rawnak Hasan	Swapner Bangladesh Foundation	
M A R C H	30	Tungiparar Miya Bhai		Shamim Ahamed Roni (director); Shanto Khan, Prarthana Fardin Dighi	Shapla Media	

== April–June ==
Opening	Title	Production company	Cast and crew	Ref.
A P R I L				
M A Y				
J U N E				

== July–September ==
Opening		Title	Production company	Cast and crew	Ref.
J U L Y
J U L Y	A U G U S T				
S E P T E M B E R					

== October–December ==
Opening		Title	Production company	Cast and crew	Ref.
O C T O B E R					
N O V E M B E R	26	Nonajoler Kabbo	Ilann Girard	Rezwan Shahriar Sumit (director); Titas Zia Fazlur Rahman Babu, Shatabdi Wadud	
D E C E M B E R	3	Mission Extreme	Cop Creation / Mime Multimedia	Sunny Sarwar (director), Faisal Ahmed (director); Arifin Shuvoo, Jannatul Ferdous Oishee, Taskeen Rahman, Fazlur Rahman Babu, Iresh Zaker, Shahiduzzaman Selim	
D E C E M B E R	24	Mridha Vs Mridha	Toaster Production	Rony Bhowmick (director & producer), Tanvir Hossain Probal (producer), Tariq Anam Khan, Siam Ahmed, Nova Feroz, Sanjida Prity, Nima Rahman, Rayhan Khan (story, scriptwritter & dialogue)	
D E C E M B E R	31	Raat Jaaga Ful	Government Grant	Mir Sabbir (actor, director, story, screenplay & dialogue), Fazlur Rahman Babu, Jannatul Ferdous Oishee, Rashed Mamun Opu, Abul Hayat, Dilara Jaman	
D E C E M B E R	31	Chironjeeb Mujib	Haider Enterprise	Nazrul Islam (director); Ahmed Rubel, Dilara Hanif Purnima	

== See also ==
- List of Bangladeshi films of 2020
- List of Bangladeshi films of 2022
- List of Bangladeshi films
- Cinema of Bangladesh
