= Naresh Bhuiyan =

Bangladeshi television and film actor

- নরেশ ভূঁইয়া
- Born: 7 September 1951 (age 74); Noakhali
- Education: University of Dhaka (MMS)
- Occupations: Actor; television personality; writer; theatre director
- Years active: 1972–present
- Spouse: Shilpi Sharkar Apu (m. 1983)
- Children: 3, including Yash Rohan

Naresh Bhuiyan (born 7 September 1951) is a Bangladeshi actor, photojournalist, theatre director, and writer. His acting career covers both television and film.

== Early life and education ==
Naresh Bhuiyan was born on 7 September 1951 in the present-day Chowmuhani area of Begumganj Upazila in Noakhali, Bangladesh. His father's name is Debendra Kumar Bhuiyan, and his mother's name is Tulsi Bala Bhuiyan. He was enrolled in the Department of Economics at the University of Dhaka. From there, he earned his honors and master's degrees. He was addicted to drama since childhood. Later, he developed an interest in stage drama.

== Career ==
Bhuiyan first acted in the play Chokher Dukh in 1972. He then joined theatre acting. In 1989, he acted on stage in the play Saat Ghater Kanakari, directed by Momtazuddin Ahmed.

Bhuiyan's journalism career began in 1973 when he worked for Chitrali. He remained associated with Chitrali until 2005.

Bhuiyan came into the limelight in 1980, when he played the role of Andu Bhai in the BTV drama Matir Kole, produced by Musa Ahmed.

Bhuiyan acted in the play Mohor Ali, based on Rabeya Khatun's novel, in 1990. Khaled Khan played the role of Mohor Ali. Bhuiyan also garnered a lot of attention for playing the role of Mohor Ali's friend.

Bhuiyan's journey as a director began in 1998 with Bhalobasi Sudhayo Na Kare Bhalobasi. It was written by his wife, popular actress Shilpi Sharkar Apu. Even after that, he produced several other plays, including Dayita, Bhalobasa Chuye Gele, Kangkkito Prohor, and Bhull Lekhte Bhull Kario Na.

In the late 1980s, Bhuiyan served as the president of the Bangladesh Cine-Journalist Association.

Bhuiyan served as the chief election commissioner for the Bangladesh Shilpi Sangha (Directors Guild) elections for 2025 to 2027.

Naresh Bhuiyan made his debut as a writer with the book Neeta Tomar Jonne. He then wrote two more books in 2018, Dipar Sarabela and Shudhui Tumi.

== Filmography ==
Key
| † | Denotes films that have not yet been released |

=== Films ===
| Year | Film | Role | Director | Ref. |
|---|---|---|---|---|
| 1977 | Saheb Bibi Golam | | Humayun Kabir | |
| 1979 | Surja Dighal Bari | Sadek | Masihuddin Shaker, Sheikh Niamat Ali | |
| 1985 | Suruj Mia | | Kazal Arefin | |
| 2004 | Lalon | | Tanvir Mokammel | |
| 2005 | Matritwa | | Zahid Hossain | |
| 2009 | Chana o Muktijuddho | | Badal Rahman | |
| 2018 | Alta Banu | | Arun Chowdhury | |
| 2018 | Swapnajaal | | Giasuddin Selim | |
| 2019 | Mayaboti | | Arun Chowdhury | |
| 2019 | Fagun Haway | Salesman | Tauquir Ahmed | |
| 2021 | Chironjeeb Mujib | | Nazrul Islam | |
| 2021 | Sphulingo | | Tauquir Ahmed | |
| 2021 | Raat Jaga Phool | | Mir Sabbir | |
| 2022 | Operation Sundarbans | Akkas | Dipankar Dipon | |
| 2022 | Daag | | Sanjoy Somadder | |
| 2022 | Payer Chap | | Saiful Islam Mannu | |
| 2023 | Uno Sir | | Syed Shakil | |
| 2023 | Pori | | Mahmudur Rahman Heme | |
| 2023 | Ekti Na Bola Golpo | | Pankaj Palit | |
| 2023 | Eti Chitra | Masuk's father | Raisul Islam Anik | |
| 2024 | Poison | | Sanjoy Somadder | |
| 2024 | Shoroter Joba | | Kusum Sikder | |
| 2024 | Fatima | Prasad's Father | Dhrubo Hasan | |
| 2025 | Rickshaw Girl | Selim | Amitabh Reza Chowdhury | |
| 2025 | Borbaad | Nitu's paternal uncle | Mehedi Hassan Hridoy | |
| 2025 | Utshob | | Tanim Noor | |
| TBA | Antorborti † | Abdur Rouf | S M Kayum | |

=== Web series ===
| Year | Film | Role | Director | OTT |
|---|---|---|---|---|
| 2021 | Morichika | Rafique | Shihab Shaheen | Chorki |
| 2023 | Kabadi | Shafin's father | Rubayet Mahmud | Bioscope |

=== Short films ===
| Year | Films | Role | Director | Ref. |
|---|---|---|---|---|
| 2016 | The Red Note | | Yash Rohan | |
| 2020 | Coronakal | Emon's father | Goutam Koiri | |
| 2022 | Ghore Fera | Ashok Mitra | Rafat Majumdar Rinku | |

=== Television ===
- Matir Kole (1980)
- Mohor Ali (1990)
- Citing Master (2019)
- Shift (2020)
- Apnar Chele Ki Kore (2020)
- Ayna (2021)
- Troll (2021)
- Moner Bari (2021)
- Match Winner (2021)
- Baker Khoni (2021)
- Thikana Bodle Jay (2024)
- Sylheti vs Noakhali (2024)
- Faram-Gate (2024)
- Ki Mayai Jorale (2025)

== Personal life ==
Naresh Bhuiyan married actress Shilpi Sharkar Apu on 23 November 1983. They have three sons. Their eldest son Avimanyu Kishore Rupai is a marketing manager at PhillipCapital, Singapore. The second son, Yash Rohan, has already gained popularity as a young actor in Bengali dramas and films, and their younger son, Arjun.
