= 92.8 FM =

FM radio frequency

The following radio stations broadcast on FM frequency 92.8 MHz:

== Bangladesh ==
- Radio Bhumi in Dhaka

== China ==
- Doumen People's Radio in Doumen, Zhuhai
- GRT News Radio in Meizhou

== Indonesia ==
- RRI Programa 4 in Jakarta

== Israel ==
- Kol Chai in Central Israel

== Malaysia ==
- Hitz (radio station) in Alor Setar, Kedah, Perlis, Penang, and Kota Bharu, Kelantan
- Zayan in Johor Bahru, Johor and Singapore

== New Zealand ==
- Radio Hauraki in Taupo

== United Kingdom ==
- BBC Radio Cymru in Penmaen Rhos
- Unity Radio in Manchester
