= Antorborti =

Upcoming Bangladeshi film by S M Kayum

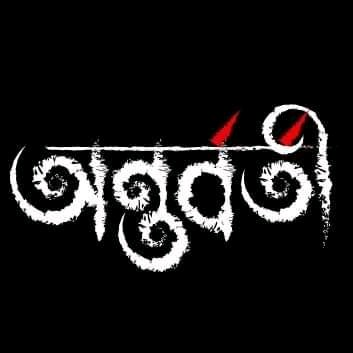
- Title poster
- Bengali: অন্তর্বর্তী
- Directed by: S M Kayum
- Written by: S M Kayum
- Starring: Ahmed Rubel; Abu Hurayra Tanvir; Neelanjona Neela; Amirul Haque Chowdhury; Rahamat Ali; Naresh Bhuiyan; Fariha Shams Sheuti
- Cinematography: Golam Maola Nabir; Kishor Mahamud
- Edited by: Sameer Ahmed
- Production company: Citrol Production
- Running time: 90 minutes
- Country: Bangladesh
- Language: Bangla

Antorborti (Bengali: অন্তর্বর্তী, lit. 'In Between') is an upcoming Bangladeshi Bengali-language mystery-drama-romance genre film written and directed by S M Kayum, in his feature directorial debut. The film features Ahmed Rubel and Neelanjona Neela, with Naresh Bhuiyan making an extended cameo appearance.

== Synopsis ==
The story of the film is of greed, lust, hunger, social status and ego.

== Cast ==
The cast includes:

- Ahmed Rubel as Sojol
- Abu Hurayra Tanvir as Dhurbo
- Neelanjona Neela as Arpa
- Fariha Shams Sheuti as Shaumi
- Amirul Haque Chowdhury as Abdul Khalek
- Rahamat Ali as Khandaker Sir
- Naresh Bhuiyan as Abdul Rouf
- Rani Laboni Urmi as Arpa's mother

== Production ==
Antorborti is directed by S M Kayum, in his feature directorial debut.

=== Casting ===
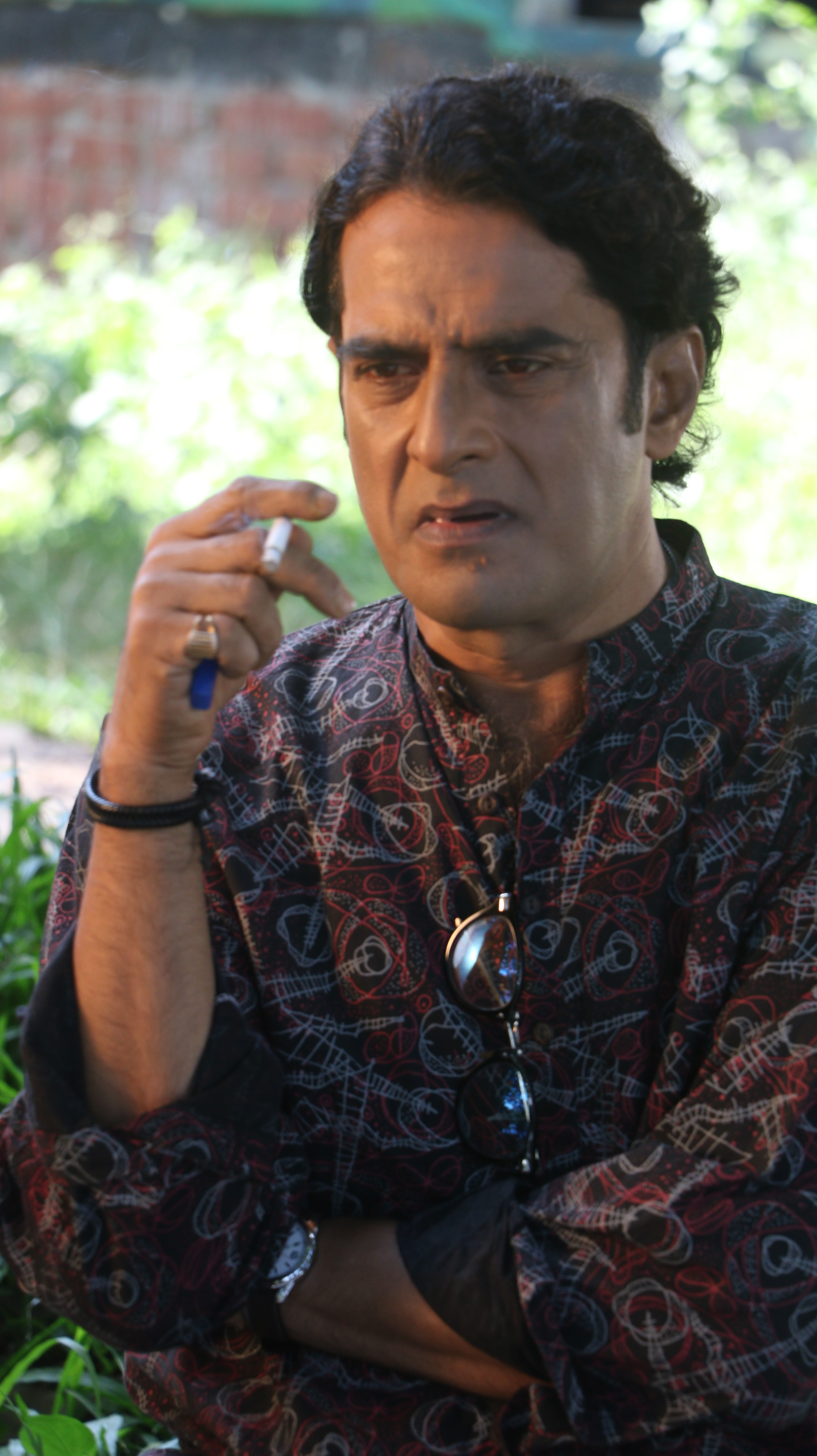
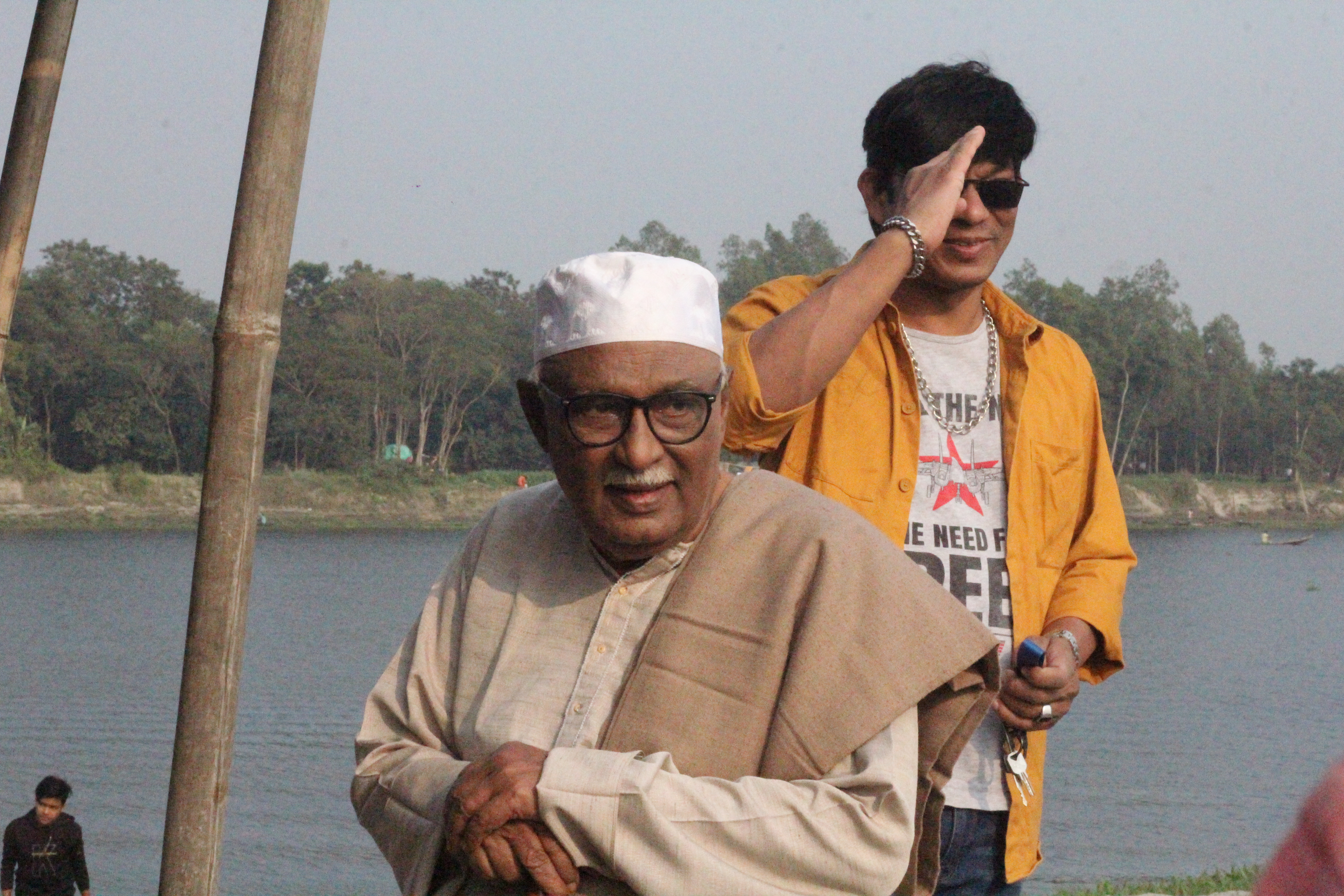
Ahmed Rubel (left) was signed for the lead role and Amirul Haque Chowdhury (right) signed for another informant role.

On December 26, Masum Aziz was signed to play Abdur Rauf, Dhruv's father. However, due to illness, he was unable to take up the role, and Naresh Bhuiya played Abdur Rauf.

On 13 February 2022 an article appeared in the Jugantor newspaper about Neelanjona Neela and Abu Hurayra Tanvir and their roles in Antorborti.

=== Filming ===
Shooting took place at Jahangirnagar University. Filming wrapped in 2024.

=== Post-production ===
The editing of Antorborti was undertaken by Sameer Ahmed. Sound design and mixing were completed by Sayba Talukder.

Chinnmoy Roy served as the colorist for Antorborti. Chinnmoy had also worked as the colorist on Rehana Maryam Noor, a landmark film in Bangladeshi cinema history.

== Soundtrack ==
Antorborti

Soundtrack album by Pinto Ghosh, Musfiq Litu
- Recorded: 2024
- Studio: Noinamik, Long Play
- Genre: Feature Film Soundtrack
- Language: Bangla
- Label: CD choice
- Producer: Citrol Production

Pinto Ghosh chronology
Fagun Haway (2019)	Antorborti (2025)

Musfiq Litu chronology
'Adam' (2023)	Antorborti (2025)

The film score was composed by Pintu Ghosh, with lyrics written by S M Kayum and tune arrangement by Rahul Kumar Datta.

Ghosh also served as the music director for the film Antorborti.

The soundtrack features vocals by Fahmida Nabi, who performs the song "Thak Na Durer Hoye" (also reported earlier as "Tumi Geao Gaan Onnokaro Shure".

Fahmida Nabi performs a romantic song titled "Tor Rin" for the film, a duet for the first time with Imran Mahmudul. The lyrics are written by director S M Kayum, composition is by Rahul Kumar Dutta, and the music arrangement is by Musfiq Litu.
