= Star Insight =

Fortnightly magazine

- Editor: Rafi Hossain
- Categories: Fashion
- Frequency: Fortnightly
- First issue: July 1996
- Final issue: April 2013
- Company: The Daily Star (owned by Mediastar)
- Country: Bangladesh
- Language: English

Star Insight was a fortnightly magazine published as a supplement to The Daily Star, Bangladesh's largest circulated English newspaper. The magazine aimed at promoting people and events and achievements from underprivileged rural and townships of Bangladesh. Prominent figures of Bangladesh like Shykh Seraj and Faridur Reza Sagar contributed to the magazine. Publication began in July 1996. The magazine ceased publication in April 2013 and was integrated into the national page of The Daily Star.

== Sections ==
Regular Sections

- Story
- Crossword/Brain Twisters

Recurring sections

- Feature
- Journey Through Bangladesh
- Guru Griho
- She
- Behind the Scene

== Team ==
- Rafi Hossain = Editor In Charge
- Zahidul Naim Zakaria = Assistant Editor
- Hasan Ameen Sahuddin = Sub-editor
- Zia Nazmul = Graphic Designer
- Arif Haque = Cover Designer
- Md Ariful Islam = Cover Designer

== Activities ==
Star Insight team organized annual event called Celebrating Life on behalf of the Daily Star and supported by Standard Chartered Bank. it recognized the best in photography film and lyrics.
