= Faridur Reza Sagar =

Bangladeshi film producer and writer

- ফরিদুর রেজা সাগর
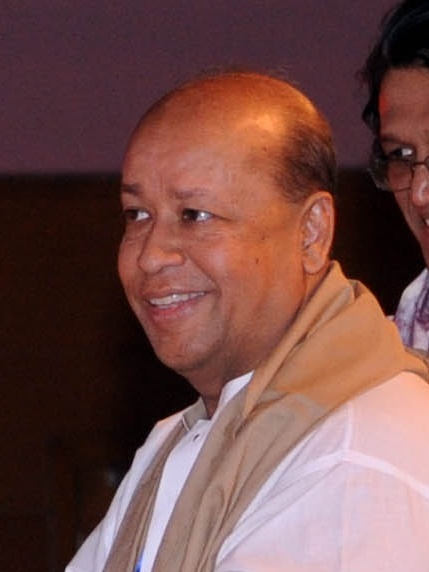
- Sagar at the National Film Awards ceremony in Dhaka
- Born: Faridur Reza; 22 February 1955 (age 71); Dhaka, East Bengal, Dominion of Pakistan
- Citizenship: Bangladeshi
- Occupations: Writer, film producer, media executive
- Organization(s): Impress Telefilm Ltd, Channel i
- Spouse: Kona Reza
- Children: 2 (Meghna, Mohona)
- Parents: Fazlul Haque (father); Rabeya Khatun (mother)
- Relatives: Keka Ferdousi (sister)
- Awards: Bangla Academy Literary Award (2005); Ekushey Padak (2015); Bangladesh National Film Award (multiple)
- Website: frsagar.com

Faridur Reza Sagar (born 22 February 1955) is a Bangladeshi media executive, writer, and film producer. He serves as the managing director of Impress Telefilm Ltd and Channel i. He was awarded the Bangla Academy Literary Award in 2005 for his contributions to children's literature and the Ekushey Padak in 2015 by the Government of Bangladesh for his role in mass media.

As a film producer, Sagar has received multiple Bangladesh National Film Awards for Best Film, producing acclaimed films such as Daruchini Dwip (2007), Moner Manush (2010), Ghetuputra Kamola (2012), Mrittika Maya (2013), Oggatonama (2016), and Gor (2020).

== Early life ==
Sagar was born on 22 February 1955 in Dhaka, East Bengal (now Bangladesh). His father, Fazlul Haque, was a pioneer filmmaker and editor of *Cinema*, the first movie magazine in East Pakistan. His mother was the prolific novelist Rabeya Khatun. His sister, Keka Ferdousi, is a prominent Bangladeshi television chef and author.

In 1966, Sagar starred in the lead role of *President*, a children's film directed by his father. During his youth, he worked as a presenter and host on Bangladesh Television (BTV).

== Career ==
=== Television and Broadcasting ===
Sagar joined Impress Telefilm Ltd and Channel i as managing director, playing a key role in developing satellite broadcasting and independent film production in Bangladesh. Under his leadership, Channel i introduced several landmark programs, including the political talk show *Tritiyo Matra*.

=== Writing ===
Sagar has written over fifty books for children and young adults across diverse genres, including mystery, adventure, travelogues, science fiction, and non-fiction related to the Bangladesh Liberation War. He is best known for his popular *Meghna* book series. He has also authored historical documentations on media, such as *Bangladesh Television-er 50 Bochhor*.

=== Film Production ===
Through Impress Telefilm Ltd, Sagar has produced over 40 feature films, many of which represented Bangladesh as official entries to the Academy Awards.

== Selected bibliography ==
- Meghna-O-Galpa Buro
- Meghna-O-Aladin-er Lamp
- Meghna-O-Eti
- Cox's Bazar-er Kakatua
- Jibober Shangee
- Bangladesh Television-er 50 Bochhor (2015)

== Selected filmography ==
=== Producer ===
- Shasti (2004)
- Nirontor (2006)
- Daruchini Dwip (2007)
- Aha! (2007)
- Third Person Singular Number (2009)
- Moner Manush (2010)
- Amar Bondhu Rashed (2011)
- Ghetuputra Kamola (2012)
- Uttarer Sur (2012)
- Mrittika Maya (2013)
- Jalal's Story (2014)
- Krishnopaksho (2016)
- Oggatonama (2016)
- Aynabaji (2016)
- Komola Rocket (2018)
- Fagun Haway (2019)
- Gor (2020)
- Beauty Circus (2022)
- Damal (2022)
- Roktojoba (2023)

=== Writer ===
- Damal (2022)

== Awards and recognitions ==
- Bangla Academy Literary Award (2005)
- Ekushey Padak (2015)
- Bangladesh National Film Award for Best Film (Multiple recipient)
- Agrani Bank Children's Literature Award
- Chander Haat Children's Literature Award
- Euro Children's Literature Award
- BACHSAS Award
