= W Vision =

Logo of the "W Vision" Web site.

W Vision (pronounced double vision) was a Japanese Web site claiming to be "the Internet's first real TV station." It preceded by far the now-famous video sites such as YouTube, though it didn't have a user community. Developed by a joint venture between the Impress Group and the Watanabe Productions Group, the Web site provided videos from various content provider and producers, using software including RealPlayer, VDOLive Player, and FutureSplash (now Adobe Flash). The service started in the end of the 1990s, hence the low-quality streaming videos to accommodate the Internet users mostly connecting via dial-up service. The service today is closed.
