= Mitali Perkins =

Indian-American writer

Mitali Bose Perkins
- Education: Stanford University (BA); University of California, Berkeley (MPP)
- Occupations: Children's and young adult writer
- Website: mitaliperkins.com

Mitali Perkins is an Indian-American writer of children's and young adult literature.

== Early life ==
Mitali was born in Kolkata, India, and moved to the United States when she was seven. As a child she lived in India, Ghana, Cameroon, London, New York City, and Mexico City.

== Education ==
Mitali Perkins earned a Bachelor of Arts in political science at Stanford University and a Master of Public Policy at University of California, Berkeley.

== Career ==
Perkins has taught middle school, high school, and college students. Perkins was an adjunct associate professor at Saint Mary's College of California.

A film based on Perkins' book, Rickshaw Girl, was produced in 2021. It was directed by Amitabh Reza Chowdhury.

== Published works ==
- The Not So Star-Spangled Life of Sunita Sen (1993)
- Monsoon Summer (2004)
- Rickshaw Girl (illustrated by Jamie Hogan, 2007)
- First Daughter: Extreme American Makeover (2007)
- First Daughter: White House Rules (2008)
- Secret Keeper (2009)
- Bamboo People: A Novel (2010)
- Open Mic: Riffs on Life Between Cultures in Ten Voices (editor, 2013)
- Tiger Boy (2015)
- You Bring the Distant Near (2017)
- Forward Me Back to You (2019)
- Between Us and Abuela: A Family Story from the Border (illustrated by Sara Palacios, 2019)
- Home Is in Between (illustrated by Lavanya Naidu, 2021)
- Steeped in Stories: Timeless Children's Novels to Refresh Our Tired Souls (2021)
- Bare Tree and Little Wind: A Story for Holy Week (illustrated by Khoa Le, 2022)
- The Story of Us (illustrated by Kevin Howdeshell and Kristen Howdeshell, 2022)
- Hope in the Valley (2023)
- Holy Night and Little Star: A Story for Christmas (illustrated by Khoa Le, 2023)
- Between My Hands (illustrated by Naveen Selvanathan, 2024)
- Just Making: A Guide for Compassionate Creatives (2025)
- The Golden Necklace: A Darjeeling Tea Mystery (illustrated by Maithili Joshi, 2025)
- Doing Something New: A Prayer for Beginnings (illustrated by Andrés Landazábal, 2026)

== Awards and recognition ==
- 2008 Jane Addams Children's Book Award for Rickshaw Girl
- 2011 YALSA Best Fiction for Young Adults Top Ten for Bamboo People
- 2016 South Asia Book Award for Tiger Boy
- 2017 National Book Award for Young People's Literature longlist for You Bring the Distant Near
- 2018 Walter Dean Myers Teen Honor Book for You Bring the Distant Near
- 2020 Rise: A Feminist Book Project Top Ten for Forward Me Back to You
- 2020 Américas Award for Children’s and Young Adult Literature for Between Us and Abuela
