= Abdul Mukit Majumder =

Bangladeshi businessman and activist

Abdul Muqeed Majumdar
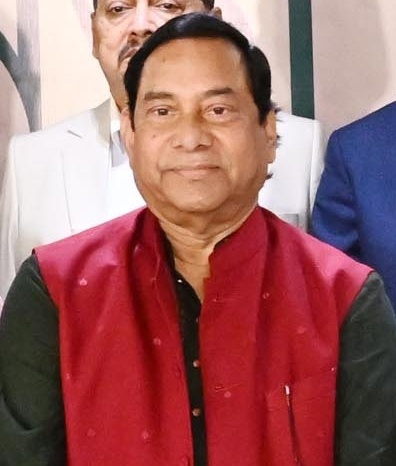
- Majumdar in 2026
- Born: October 25; Dhaka District, Bengal Presidency, British India
- Occupations: Environmental activist, writer, businessman, social worker
- Writing career
- Notable awards: Independence Award, 2026
- Website: www.pojf.org

Abdul Muqeed Majumdar (born 25 October), widely known as Mukit Majumder Babu, is a Bangladeshi businessman, environmental activist, writer and social worker. He is a founding director of Impress Group and the founder of the Prokriti O Jibon Foundation. He is popularly known as Prokritibondhu (friend of nature) for his work in environmental protection. In 2026, he was awarded the highest civilian honour award, the Independence Award, in recognition of his contribution to environmental conservation.

== Early life and education ==
Majumdar was born on 25 October in Dacca, East Pakistan (now Dhaka, Bangladesh). During his student life, he took part in the Bangladesh Liberation War in 1971. After the independence of Bangladesh, he completed his studies at Notre Dame College. In 1978, he went abroad for higher education. He studied in the United Kingdom and the United States and returned to Bangladesh in 1984.

== Career ==
After returning to Bangladesh, Majumdar started his business career. He is one of the founding directors of Impress Group.

=== Environmental activities ===
He founded the Prokriti O Jibon Foundation in 2009. The organization aims to raise awareness about the environment, biodiversity, wildlife conservation, and climate change. In 2010, he launched a television documentary program titled Prokriti O Jibon on Channel i. The program focuses on nature, wildlife, and environmental awareness, and has aired more than 350 episodes.

He and his organization have been involved in various activities, including:

- Tree plantation programs across Bangladesh
- Wildlife conservation and release
- Conservation of endangered species such as Batagur turtles and vultures
- Bird surveys and protection of migratory birds
- Establishment of nature information centers, including one in Lawachara National Park
- Organizing environmental workshops, research, and awareness programs
- Promoting nature conservation through fairs and awards

In 2022, the Prokriti O Jibon Club was established to promote environmental awareness at the grassroots level. Branches were formed in all 64 districts of Bangladesh. In 2023, the club organized a nationwide tree plantation campaign titled "Sobuje Sajai Bangladesh," planting and distributing more than one million native trees.

== Writing and publications ==
Majumder is a regular contributor to national newspapers in Bangladesh. He has written several books on nature and the environment, many of which are published during the Ekushey Book Fair. He edited a book titled Prokritikotha, which includes writings by various authors. He serves as the chairman of the editorial board of the quarterly magazine Prokritibarta. In addition, he publishes leaflets, books, and calendars on environmental awareness and distributes them free of cost at the grassroots level.

== Social work ==
Apart from environmental work, Majumder is involved in humanitarian activities across Bangladesh. In 2012, he established a healthcare center under the Prokriti O Jibon Foundation. The center has provided free medical treatment, medicines, maternal care, and surgical support to over 100,000 underprivileged people. Medical camps have been organized in remote rural and coastal areas, providing healthcare services, medicines, and winter clothing to thousands of people.

He has also supported income-generating activities for poor communities by providing livestock, sewing machines, rickshaws, and other resources. During the COVID-19 pandemic, he provided medical supplies and financial assistance in different districts. He has also supported education and nutrition programs for children, including free school meals, and has participated in relief efforts during floods.

== Awards and recognition ==
- National Environment Award (2012 and 2015)
- Bangabandhu Award for Wildlife Conservation (2013)
- HSBC–The Daily Star Climate Award (2012)
- Dhaka Ahsania Mission Chand Sultana Award (2015)
- FOBANA Award (USA, 2016)
- Business Excellence Award (Singapore, 2014)
- Pallima Green Gold Medal (2017)
- Friend of Nature Award (2021)
- Independence Award (2026)
