= Dhaka Metro (2019 TV series) =

Bangladeshi television series

- Poster
- Genre: Magical realism
- Written by: Amitabh Reza Chowdhury; Aditya Kabir
- Directed by: Amitabh Reza Chowdhury
- Starring: Aupee Karim; Mostafa Monwar; Shariful Islam
- Country of origin: Bangladesh
- Original language: Bengali
- No. of seasons: 1
- No. of episodes: 9

Production
- Production company: Half Stop Down

Original release
- Network: Hoichoi
- Release: 4 November 2019

Dhaka Metro (Bengali: ঢাকা মেট্রো গ ১৭৯১০৬) is a Bangladeshi Bengali-language television series written by Amitabh Reza Chowdhury and Aditya Kabir and directed by Amitabh Reza Chowdhury, started streaming on the Bengali OTT platform Hoichoi from 11 April 2019.

The plot written by Aditya Kabir overnight in 2007. After that, Amitabh Reza Chowdhury tried to make a movie from it for 7 years. Unable to find a producer, he finally decided to make nine-episode series, Hoichoi was introduced. Chowdhury says he based the characters on contemporary Bangladesh, but the episodes follow magical realism.

== Plot ==
Kuddus, takes a car and leaves aimlessly for a travel. On the way, he meets a little kid. They keep on facing interesting events one after another.

== Themes ==
Kuddus represents the youth of Bangladesh, while Bangladesh's culture is represented by Rahman, who gently puts different aspects of culture including Partition of Bengal, Chittagong Hill Tracts unrest and other issues to life. Aupee Karim, representing Bangladesh, told that she cut off her husband's throat, indicating Bangladesh Liberation War and the subsequent separation from Pakistan.

== Cast ==
- Aupee Karim as Joygun Bibi
- Neville Ferdous Hasan as Kuddus
- Shariful Islam as Rahman
- Sharmin Zoha Shoshee
- Mostafa Monwar

== Reception ==
A review by Antara Chakraborthy in The Indian Express described the series as "a wild ride" and the reviewer noted: "What really kept me hooked were the characters, each weirder and crazier than the next."

In a negative Dhaka Tribune review, Rummana Foisal Nafiu stated that although the series has "a great plot for a road trip dark comedy thriller...all the right elements, a brilliant cast, and was helmed by one of Bangladesh’s greatest film-makers", it "fails to grab your attention" and is marred by "weak writing, faulty production, misspelled quotes, and wrong subtitles".
