= Impress Group =

Bangladeshi Conglomerates

- Formation: 1978
- Headquarters: Dhaka, Bangladesh
- Region served: Bangladesh
- Official language: Bengali
- Subsidiaries: Channel i Incepta Pharmaceuticals; Incepta Vaccines Limited Impress Energy and Services Limited; Radio Bhumi; Allied Garments Limited Impress Telefilms
- Revenue: ▲৳5406 Crore ▲US$640 million
- Website: www.impress-group.org

Impress Group (Bengali: ইমপ্রেস গ্রুপ) is a Bangladeshi diversified conglomerate based in Dhaka.

== History ==
Impress Group was established in 1978 as Impress Limited, an advertising agency. The Directors of the Group are Zahiruddin Mahmud, Abdur Rashid Majumder, Enayet Husain Siraj, Faridur Reza Sagar, Reaz Ahmed Khan, and Abdul Muqeed Majumdar.

Impress Group established Impress Telefilms Limited in 1996.

Impress Group financed Abdul Muktadir to establish Incepta Pharmaceuticals in 1999. The company started retail distribution in January 2000. Incepta is the second largest pharmaceutical company in Bangladesh.

Impress Group's television channel, channel i, started on air operations from 1 October 1999. Shykh Seraj is the Direct and head of news of Channel i.

Impress Group starts a fourth nightly entertainment magazine called Ananda Alo in 2008.

Impress Group becomes the majority shareholder of Karnaphuli Fashions Limited, Karnaphuli Knitting and Dyeing Limited, and Newtex Designs Limited in 2009. The companies are reorganized under the Impress-Newtex Composite Textiles limited. In 2010, Brummer & Partners Asset Management (Bangladesh) Limited purchases a stake in Impress-Newtex Composite Textiles limited and announced further investment in the company to expand production capacity.

Incepta Pharmaceuticals starts manufacturing vaccines in Bangladesh in 2011. It is the first local vaccine manufacturer in Bangladesh.

Impress Group founded Impress Boutique Cinema to finance indie filmmakers on 30 March 2013.

Incepta Aviations and Impress Capital Limited starts operations in 2014. Impress Aviation provides charter helicopter services in Bangladesh.

On 28 July 2016, Incepta Vaccines starts mass-producing vaccines at a facility in Savar Upazila. A subsidiary of Impress Group, Next Space Limited is hired as a subcontractor for Rooppur Nuclear Power Plant.

In January 2021, Arastoo Khan was made the chief executive officer and managing director of Impress Capital Limited. He is the former chairperson of Bangladesh Commerce Bank and Islami Bank Bangladesh. Abdul Muktadir, chairperson of Incepta Vaccines said that they can produce COVID-19 vaccines for the COVID-19 pandemic in Bangladesh if they were provided a blueprint for the vaccine production.

== Businesses ==
- Channel i
- Build Bangladesh
- Impress Fashion Limited
- Impress Wear Limited
- Impress Boutique Cinema
- Incepta Pharmaceuticals
- Impress Aviation Limited
- Impress-Newtex Composite Textiles limited
- iSoftware
- Prokriti o Jibon Foundation
- Impress Capital Limited
- Incepta Vaccines Limited
- Impress Audio Vision Limited
- Impress Printing Limited
- Icon Telefilm Limited
- ipositive
- Maheen Label Tex Limited
- Impress Accessories Limited
- M.R.S. Syndicate Limited
- IPORT Logistics Limited
- iPort Aviation Limited
- iXPRESS Limited
- Next Spaces Limited
- Impress Energy and Services Limited
- Ananda Alo
- iDIGITAL
- iCreation
- Innovative Research and Consultancy Limited
- Radio Bhumi
- Help D Bangladesh
- Allied Garments Limited
- Fashrobe Garments Limited
- AlterSense Limited
- Newtext Knit Fashions Limited
- Impress Telefilms Limited
