= No Bed of Roses =

2017 Bangladeshi drama film

No Bed of Roses (Doob)
- Promotional poster
- Directed by: Mostofa Sarwar Farooki (Dhaka, Bangladesh)
- Written by: Mostofa Sarwar Farooki (Dhaka, Bangladesh)
- Produced by: Abdul Aziz (Dhaka, Bangladesh); Irrfan Khan (Mumbai, Maharashtra, India); Ashok Dhanuka (Kolkata, West Bengal, India); Himanshu Dhanuka (Kolkata, West Bengal, India)
- Starring: Irrfan Khan (Mumbai, Maharashtra, India); Nusrat Imrose Tisha (Dhaka, Bangladesh); Rokeya Prachy (Dhaka, Bangladesh); Parno Mittra (Kolkata, West Bengal, India)
- Cinematography: Sheikh Rajibul Islam (Dhaka, Bangladesh)
- Edited by: Momin Biswas (Dhaka, Bangladesh)
- Music by: Chirkutt (Dhaka, Bangladesh); Pavel Areen (Dhaka, Bangladesh)
- Production companies: Jaaz Multimedia (Dhaka, Bangladesh); Irrfan Khan Films (Mumbai, Maharashtra, India); Eskay Movies (Kolkata, West Bengal, India)
- Distributed by: Jaaz Multimedia (Dhaka, Bangladesh); Eskay Movies (Kolkata, West Bengal, India)
- Release dates: 25 June 2017 (World premiere); 27 October 2017 (Bangladesh & India)
- Running time: 105 min 85 min (International cut)
- Countries: Bangladesh; India
- Languages: Bengali; English

No Bed of Roses (Doob as the Bengali version) is a 2017 Indo-Bangladesh joint production drama film written and directed by Mostofa Sarwar Farooki. It was produced by Abdul Aziz, Himanshu Dhanuka and Irrfan Khan under the banner of Jaaz Multimedia and Eskay Movies along with Irrfan Khan Films. It stars Irrfan Khan, Nusrat Imrose Tisha, Rokeya Prachy and Parno Mittra. The story builds up around the members of two families discovering the finer fabric of love when the headman of a family dies. The theme is that death does not always take things away: Sometimes it gives back. The film was selected as the Bangladeshi entry for the Best Foreign Language Film at the 91st Academy Awards, but it was not nominated. The film marked Irafan Khan's last Bengali film.

== Cast ==
- Irrfan Khan as Javed Hasan
- Nusrat Imrose Tisha as Saberi
- Rokeya Prachy as Maya
- Parno Mittra as Nitu
- Rashad Hossain as Ahir
- Nader Chowdhury
- Ashok Dhanuka as Aynal
- Mujib Pardeshi
- Mohammed Rakibul Hasan Reza as Lotus

== Production ==
=== Filming ===
Principal photography began in March 2016 in Dhaka. Filming locations include Chittagong Hill Tracts, Sylhet, and Dhaka. On 17 March 2016, Irrfan Khan arrived in Dhaka, Bangladesh to scout for filming locations.

Internationally acclaimed director Farooki describes No Bed of Roses as a family story of loss and regain. Regarding the film Khan said, "When I saw his first film 'Ant Story', it immediately got me interested. I was impressed with his approach, style, and the way he unravels the story ... His works carry a strong humane angle, which is why his characters are multi layered."

== Release ==
No Bed of Roses had its world premiere at the Shanghai International Film Festival on 25 June 2017. After months of waiting for clearance, the film was finally announced to be released on 27 October 2017 in Bangladesh and India. Talks were on with distributors of respective countries whether it can be released in Australia and Singapore on 27 October.

=== Reception ===
Upon release "No bed Of Roses" received positive critical acclaim from the prominent critics of both Bangladesh and India.

==== Film festivals ====
This movie has been selected to compete at the main competition round of the Shanghai International Film Festival 2017, which commenced from 17 June 2017.

No Bed of Roses has been selected for the main competition section of the 39th Moscow International Film Festival. The film wins the Kommersant Weekend Prize in the festival.

- Film Bazaar 2013 - Winner - Dubai Film Market Award
- Shanghai International Film Festival, June 2017 - Competition
- Moscow International Film Festival, June 2017 - Winner - Kommersant Jury Prize
- In competition, El Gouna Film Festival, September 2017
- Official selection, Vancouver International Film Festival, September 2017
- Official selection, Busan International Film festival, October 2017
- Closing film, South Asian Film Festival, Paris, October 2017
- In competition, Asia Pacific Screen Awards, November 2017
- Official selection, 48th International Film Festival of India, Goa, 20–28 November 2017.
- Official Selection, IFFK Kerala 2017.
- Official Selection, Munich IFF 2018.
- Official Selection, SIFF 2018.
- Official Selection, Asian World Film Festival 2018, California.

==== Reviews ====
Thoroughly modern and unlike Farooki's previous work, this is a sobering, engrossing separation drama... It takes an actor of Irrfan Khan's stature and magnetism to turn an intimate separation drama into something special, and a writer-director like Bangladesh's happy maverick Mostofa Sarwar Farooki to layer on subtleties and shades of meaning with realistic detachment that never slips into melodrama... Its visual style and pacing make as much of an impression as the head-shaking story. — Deborah Young, The Hollywood Reporter

Directed with an assured and graceful touch that evokes the elegiac tone of a requiem, Mostofa Sarwar Farooki proves he's a singular voice in Bangladeshi cinema. With Irrfan Khan delivering another sublime lead performance (while being billed as co-producer), the film should bloom at festivals and secure a limited release in India, despite some censorship issues back home…..Other actors in the mixed cast of Bangladeshis and Indians are equally absorbing, especially Tisha. — Maggie Lee, Chief Asia Film Critic, Variety

The latest work from Mostofa Sawar Farooki No Bed Of Roses (Doob) is an intimate family drama which eschews the usual melodramatic trappings of such fare to explore the quietly devastating impact of a husband's infidelity on those closest to him... Boasting an excellent central performance from acclaimed Indian actor Irrfan Khan... Khan is characteristically magnetic and surprisingly empathetic... While the story is salacious, Farooki's nuanced screenplay avoids cliche — sex scenes are notably absent — to instead focus on the very real pain of the situation... Alongside Khan, who will be familiar to Western audiences, the cast is universally strong... the evolving relationship between mother and daughter in the wake of Javed's seismic betrayal provides the emotional heart of the narrative, along with Saberi's feelings towards her father, and it's refreshing to see this age-old story told from the equal perspective of the women involved. Farooki handles the piece with grace and sensitivity; an approach augmented by Pavel Arin's evocative score, which mixes the traditional and the contemporary, and debut cinematographer Sheikh Rajibul Islam's arresting, contemplative visuals. — Nikki Baughan, Screen International

Farooqi never quite ventures to spoon-feed us with an explanation of exactly why and how Javed Hasan reached the tipping point of leaving his family and marrying the girl who had broken his home. The human mind, with all its complexities, is simply left to itself here, the viewer encouraged to make his or her own interpretation with ample hints that could mean more things than one.

== Controversy ==
On 16 February 2017, the Ministry of Information halted the film's "no-objection" certificate. Earlier, writer Humayun Ahmed's wife Meher Afroz Shaon had brought to the government's notice that part of the film resembles a period of her deceased husband's life.

== Soundtrack ==
Doob (No Bed of Roses)

Soundtrack album by Chirkutt
- Released: 2017
- Genre: Soundtrack
- Labels: Jaaz Multimedia; Eskay Music
- Producers: Abdul Aziz; Ashok Dhanuka; Himanshu Dhanuka; Irrfan Khan

The soundtrack music composed by Chirkutt.

| No. | Title | Lyrics | Music | Singer(s) | Length |
|---|---|---|---|---|---|
| 1. | "Ahare Jibon" (Composed by Chirkutt) | Sharmin Sultana Sumi | Chirkutt | Sharmin Sultana Sumi | 4:15 |

== Accolades ==
Doob was nominated for five awards from the Filmfare Awards East.

| Ciromonies | Year | Category | Recipients and nominees | Result | Ref(s) |
|---|---|---|---|---|---|
| Filmfare Awards East | 2017 | Best Lyricist | Sharmin Sultana Sumi - "Ahare Jibon" | Nominated | |
| Filmfare Awards East | 2017 | Best Playback Singer - Female | Sharmin Sultana Sumi - "Ahare Jibon" | Nominated | |
| Filmfare Awards East | 2017 | Best Actor (Critics' awards) | Irrfan Khan | Nominated | |
| Filmfare Awards East | 2017 | Best Background Score | Pavel Areen | Nominated | |
| Filmfare Awards East | 2017 | Best Cinematography | Sheikh Rajibul Islam | Nominated | |
| Meril-Prothom Alo Awards | 2017 | Best Film Actress | Nusrat Imrose Tisha | Won | |

== See also ==
- List of submissions to the 91st Academy Awards for Best Foreign Language Film
- List of Bangladeshi submissions for the Academy Award for Best Foreign Language Film
