= Mati O Manush =

Bangladeshi television series

Mati O Manush (Bengali: মাটি ও মানুষ), originally called Amar Desh, was a pioneering television programme on Bangladesh Television. The programme started in the mid-1980s and focused on the agricultural sector of Bangladesh.

The show was hosted by Rezaul Karim Siddique. Rezaul Karim Siddique was involved in this program in January 1983. In 1985, the show's title was changed from Amar Desh to Mati O Manush. At that time, the producer, Alimuzzaman, picked Shykh Seraj as another anchor in this program. Seraj left in 1996. Dewan Siraz was made Siddique's co-anchor of this program until he left Bangladesh for overseas job.

Shykh Seraj started a new programme at Channel i named Hridoye Mati O Manush.

Mati O Manush is the most popular and oldest program of Bangladesh Television. Afterwards, most Bangladesh television channels produced a program about agriculture that was based on the Mati O Manush model. The program made agriculture a more prestigious profession in Bangladesh.
