= Fatima (2024 film) =

- Poster
- Directed by: Dhrubo Hasan
- Screenplay by: Dhrubo Hasan; Adnan Habib
- Story by: Dhrubo Hasan
- Produced by: Outcaste Films
- Starring: Tasnia Farin; Yash Rohan; Tariq Anam Khan; Pantho Kanai; Manosh Bandyopadhyo; Ayesha Monica
- Cinematography: Tuhin Tamijul
- Edited by: Dhrubo Hasan; Adnan Habib
- Music by: Pavel Areen
- Production company: Outcaste Films
- Distributed by: Bongo BD; Jaaz Multimedia
- Release date: 24 May 2024
- Country: Bangladesh
- Language: Bengali

Fatima is a 2024 Bangladeshi Bengali-language film released in May 2024. Directed by Dhrubo Hasan, it is a dramatic portrayal of two women's struggles across time, juxtaposing the 1971 Liberation War with modern-day Bangladesh. Tasnia Farin stars in her film debut, alongside Yash Rohan and Pantha Kanai. Farin's performance in the film won her the Best Actress award at Fajr Film Festival.

== Plot ==
Fatima, a woman caught in the chaos of the 1971 Liberation War in Bangladesh, faces oppression and violence as she seeks freedom. Her struggles are paralleled by a modern woman in 2024, who also grapples with societal constraints and personal battles for independence. As both women fight for their rights, their stories intersect, revealing the shared strength and resilience of women across time. Ultimately, they inspire one another to reclaim their identities and destinies in their respective fights for liberation.

== Cast ==
- Tasnia Farin as Fatima
- Yash Rohan as Prosad
- Gausul Alom Shawon as Rashid, a financier
- Manosh Bandyopadhyay as Sobhan, Fatima's material uncle
- Pantho Kanai as Anowar
- Dhrubo Hasan as Hasan, a film director
- Ayesha Monica as Sultana, Fatima's roommate
- Rizvi Rizu as Rizvi
- Jayoti Mahalanobish as Prosad's mother
- AK Azad Shetu as OC Azad

=== Guest appearances ===
- Tariq Anam Khan as Abbas Chowdhury
- Shahed Ali as Khurshid
- Shatabdi Wadud as Azad, a freedom fighter
- Monir Ahmed Shakil as Abdullahil Baki
- Shilpi Sharkar Apu as Jahanara
- ABM Sumon as Amanullah, a freedom fighter
- Naresh Bhuiyan as Prosad's father

== Production ==
The production of the film started in 2017. Then it stopped due to various reasons. In 2023, some work of the movie is done again. The art direction of the film was managed by Tareq Bablu, Uttam Guha, and Shihab Nurun Nabi. Kabir Ahamed, Avisek Arora, and Pinaki Majumder worked as assistant directors for the film.

== Release ==
The film was released in 10 theaters in Bangladesh on May 24, 2024, clashing with Sushagotom and Moynar Shesh Kotha.

=== Premiere show ===
The film had its world premiere in Tehran, the capital of Iran.

== Awards ==
After the film's premiere at the 42nd Fajr International Film Festival, Farin won the Crystal Simorgh Award for Outstanding Performance by a Female Actress.
