= Rabeya Khatun =

Bangladeshi writer (1935–2021)

- রাবেয়া খাতুন
- Born: 27 December 1935; Bikrampur, Bengal Presidency, British India
- Died: 3 January 2021 (aged 85); Dhaka, Bangladesh
- Occupation: Novelist
- Spouse: Fazlul Haque (m. 1952; died 1990)
- Children: 4, including: Faridur Reza Sagar; Keka Ferdousi
- Awards: full list

Rabeya Khatun (27 December 1935 – 3 January 2021) was a Bangladeshi novelist. She wrote over 50 novels and more than 400 short stories. Her works also include essays, research, religious history, and travelogues. She was awarded Bangla Academy Literary Award in 1973, Ekushey Padak in 1993, and Independence Day Award in 2017 by the Government of Bangladesh.

Khatun died of cardiac arrest on 3 January 2021 at her residence in Gulshan, Dhaka.

== Early life and education ==
Khatun was born on 27 December 1935 to Maulavi Mohammad Mulluk Chand and Hamida Khatun in Bikrampur in the then Bengal Presidency, British India (now in Munshiganj District, Bangladesh). She was the second of their three children. Khatun grew up in the Shantinagar area in Dhaka. She passed the entrance examination from Armanitola School in 1948.

On 23 July 1952, she married Fazlul Haque (1930–1990). He was the editor of the Cinema magazine. He directed President, the first film for children in Bangladesh.

== Career ==
Khatun worked at Khawatin magazine, edited by Jahanara Imam. She then worked as the editor of the literature section of the magazine Cinema along with Zahir Raihan. Later she became the editor of the monthly Angana.

Khatun was a council member of Bangla Academy. She was a member of the jury board of the Bangladesh National Film Awards, Bangladesh Shishu Academy, Notun Kuri of Bangladesh Television.

== Works ==
Khatun's first story, Prashno, was published in the weekly Juger Dabi. Her novel Rajarbagh was published in Begum. She wrote her first novel, Madhumati, in 1963. She wrote about the Bangladesh Liberation War in her book Ekattorer Noy Maash in 1990. Two of her novels, Nirasraya and Biday O Ashok Reba, have never been published.

=== Novels ===
- Nirashraya [Shelterless (Unpublished)]
- Biday [Farewell (Unpublished)]
- Ashok-Reba [Ashok-Reba (Unpublished)]
- Madhumati (1963) [Madhumati (1963)]
- Saheb Bazar (1965) [Saheb Market (1965)]
- Ananta Anwesha (1969) [Infinite Quest (1969)]
- Razarbagh Shalimarbagh (1969) [Razarbagh Shalimarbagh (1969)]
- Mon Ek Shwet Kapoti [The Mind is a White Dove]
- Ferari Surya (Muktijuddho Bhittik) [The Fugitive Sun (Based on Liberation War)]
- Onekjoner Ekjon [One Among Many]
- Jiboner Ar Ek Nam [Another Name of Life]
- Dibos Rajoni [Day and Night]
- Sei Ek Bosonte [That One Spring]
- Mohor Ali (1985) [Mohor Ali (1985)]
- Neel Nishith (Muktijuddho Bhittik) [Dark Blue Night (Based on Liberation War)]
- Bayannor Golir Ek Goli (1984) [An Alley of the 52 Alleys (1984)]
- Pakhi Shob Kore Rob [All the Birds Make Noise]
- Noyona Lake-e Rupban Dupur [Beautiful Afternoon at Noyona Lake]
- Mid Summer-e [In Midsummer]
- E Bhora Badar Mah Bhador (1988) [This Rainy Month of Bhadra (1988)]
- Se Ebong Jabatyo [He and All That Exists]
- Hanifer Ghora [Hanif's Horse]
- Hiron Dah (1995) Muktijuddho Bhittik [Burning of Hiron (1995) Based on Liberation War]
- Ei Birohokal (1995) [This Time of Separation (1995)]
- Muktijuddher Uponyas Samagra [Collected Novels of the Liberation War]
- Hotel Green Button (1995) [Hotel Green Button (1995)]
- Chander Fota [A Drop of Moonlight]
- Nirbachito Premer Uponyas [Selected Love Novels]
- Baganer Nam Malnichhora (Muktijuddho Bhittik) [The Garden Named Malnichhora (Based on Liberation War)]
- Priyo Gulshana (1997) [Dear Gulshana (1997)]
- Bosonto Bhila (1999) [Spring Villa (1999)]
- Chhaya Romoni [The Shadow Woman]
- Soundarya Sangbad (1999) [The Beauty Report (1999)]
- Hridoyer Kacher Bishoy (1999) [Matters Close to the Heart (1999)]
- Ghatok Ratri (1999) [The Murderous Night (1999)]
- Shreshtho Uponyas [Best Novels]
- Malinir Dupur [Malini's Noon]
- Rongin Kacher Janala [Colorful Glass Window]
- Megher Por Megh (Muktijuddho Bhittik) [Cloud After Cloud (Based on Liberation War)]
- Ja Kichu Aprotashito [All That is Unexpected]
- Durey Brishti [Rain in the Distance]
- Sakin O Mayataru [Sakin and the Magical Tree]
- Ramna Park-er Panch Bondhu [Five Friends of Ramna Park]
- Shudhu Tomar Jonno [Only for You]
- Thikana B H Tower [Address: B H Tower]
- Kokhono Megh Kokhono Brishti [Sometimes Clouds, Sometimes Rain]
- Prothom Boddhobhumi [The First Killing Field]
- Komolika [Komolika]
- Doshti Uponyas [Ten Novels]
- Shonkho Shokal Prokriti [Conch, Morning, Nature]
- Ja Hoyna [What Doesn't Happen]
- Akashe Ekhono Onek Raat [There is Still Much Night in the Sky]
- Uponyas Samagra [Collected Novels]
- Swonirbachito Uponyas [Self-Selected Novels]
- Jagotik [Worldly]
- Swopne Songkramito [Infected in Dreams]
- O Ke Chhilo [Who Was He]
- Moha Proloyer Por [After the Great Destruction]
- Nirbachito Uponyas [Selected Novels]
- Shohorer Shesh Bari [The Last House in the City]
- Nosto Jyotsnar Alo [Light of Spoiled Moonlight]
- Maigo [Oh Mother]
- Samudrabon O Pronoy Purush [Ocean-Forest and the Lover Man]
- Ei Dah [This Burning]
- Raima [Raima]

==== Based on Liberation War ====
- Ekattorer Noy Mash [Nine Months of '71]
- Ekattorer Nishan [The Flag of '71]

==== Uponyas Somuho ====
Ferari Surya, Megher Por Megh, Hiron Dah, Baganer Nam Malnichhora

== Adaptations ==
Khatun's book-to-film adaptations include Kokhono Megh Kokhono Brishti (2003), Megher Pore Megh (2004) and Madhumati (2011).

== Personal life ==
Khatun lived in Banani, a residential area in Dhaka. She had two sons and two daughters — Faridur Reza Sagar (b. 1955) is the current managing director of Impress Telefilm Limited and Channel i; Keka Ferdousi (b. 1960) is a television chef; Farhadur Reza Probal is an architect; and Farhana Kakoly.

== Awards ==
- Bangla Academy Literary Award (1973)
- Humayun Kadir Memorial Award (1989)
- Ekushey Padak (1993)
- Kamar Mushtaree Shahitya Puroshkar (1994)
- Lekhika Sangha Award (1994)
- Nasiruddin Gold Medal (1995)
- Shere-e Bangla Gold Medal (1996)
- Jasimuddin Award (1996)
- Shapla-Doyel Award (1996)
- Wrishiz Shahitya Padak (1998)
- Anannya Literature Award (1999)
- Laila Samad Award (1999)
- Millennium Award (2000)
- Sheltech Award (2002)
- Uro Shishu Shahitya Award (2003)
- Michael Madhusudan Award (2005)
- Gettanjali Shommanona Padak (2015)
- Independence Day Award (2017)
