= Chirkutt =

Bangladeshi rock band

Chirkutt চিরকুট
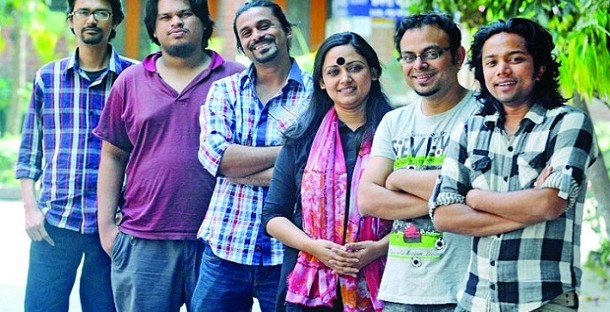

Background information
- Origin: Dhaka, Bangladesh
- Genres: Rock; pop rock
- Years active: 2002–present
- Labels: G-Series; Adhkana Music; Butter Records
- Members: Sharmin Sultana Sumi; Pavel Areen; Rayhan Parvez Akanda Pranto; Dibbo Nasser; Rongon Rouf; Yaar Hossain
- Past members: Jahid Nirob; Emon Chowdhury; Rashed Sharif Shoaib; Sabbir Ahmed; Rokon Emon; Pinto Ghosh; Anwar Shafiq Tomal; Parvez Sazzad

Chirkutt is a Bangladeshi rock band from Dhaka, formed in 2002 by Sharmin Sultana Sumi.

== History ==
Chirkutt (Bengali: চিরকুট) is a Bangladeshi rock/fusion band based in Dhaka. The band is known for blending folk, rock, and contemporary elements, and for its active presence on both national and international stages.

=== Origins & Lineup ===
Chirkutt was founded in 2002 by Sharmin Sultana Sumi in Dhaka. Over time, the lineup evolved to include additional members. Pavel Areen, who joined in 2007 (or around that period), played a pivotal role in shaping the band’s sonic identity and served as producer on their debut album Chirkuttnama. The band’s roster has featured other musicians such as Emon Chowdhury and Jahid Nirob, among others. Eight years after the band was formed they released their first album Chirkuttnama.

Chirkutt's performed at SXSW-2016 in Austin, US and South Asian Band Festival-Delhi, India, the President house concert in India-2014, India Music Week and the Jaffna Music Festival, Sri Lanka. They were also the winners of the RTV Best Band Award 2012. Chirkutt band has also embarked for a tour in Norway with Norwegian rockers Casa Murilo in 2013. They performed on Asian TV music show in September 2016.

== Members ==
=== Present members ===
- Sharmin Sultana Sumi – lead vocals (2002–present)
- Dibbo Nasser – lead guitars (2023–present)
- Pavel Areen – drums (2008–present)
- Rayhan Parvez Akanda Pranto - Guitar & Ethnic Instruments (2023–present)
- Yaar Hossain - Keyboards & Violin (2024–present)
- Faiz Sagor - Live Sound Engineer

=== Past members ===
- Jahid Nirob – keyboards (2015–2024)
- Emon Chowdhury – lead guitars (2006–2023)
- Rashed Sharif Shoaib
- Sabbir Ahmed
- Rokon Emon
- Pinto Ghosh – vocals, violin (2002–2016)
- Anwar Shafiq Tomal
- Parvez Sazzad

== Discography ==
- "চিরকুটনামা (Chronograph)" (2010)
- "যাদুর শহর (City of Magic)" (2013)
- "উধাও (Disappear)" (2017)
- "ভালোবাসাসমগ্র (Love Anthology)" (2025)

== Award ==
Channel i Music Awards

Year	Nominee / work	Award	Result
2013	"যাদুর শহর (City of Magic)"	Best Band Album of the Year	Won

RTV Music Awards

Year	Nominee / work	Award	Result
2012	Chirkutt	Best Band of the Year	Won

SAARC Film Festival Award

Year	Nominee / work	Award	Result
2016	Jalal's Story	Best Original Score	Won

== Chirkutt in film ==
The band has also worked on several local film music director. They won the "SAARC" film festival award in 2016 for the best original score of the film Jalal's Story. Chirkutt also have done the playback in the movies Television, and Piprabidya, of director Mostofa Sarwar Farooki. They did the soundtrack of Aynabaji of Amitabh Reza Chowdhury 2016 film, Ice cream of Redowan Rony. Chirkutt did the soundtrack of the movie Tumi Je Amar by RTV. They composed the soundtrack of the 2017 movie Doob – No bed of roses.
