= Sphulingo =

2021 Bangladeshi film

- Sphulingo Theatrical Poster
- স্ফুলিঙ্গ
- Directed by: Tauquir Ahmed
- Written by: Tauquir Ahmed
- Screenplay by: Tauquir Ahmed
- Produced by: Shopner Bangladesh Foundation
- Starring: Shamol Mawla; Pori Moni; Rawnak Hasan; Zakia Bari Momo
- Cinematography: Enamul Haque Sohel
- Edited by: Amit Debnath
- Music by: Pintu Ghosh
- Production company: Nakshatra Cholochitro
- Distributed by: The Abhi Kathachitra, Toffee, Bioscope Films USA
- Release date: 26 March 2021
- Running time: 152 minutes
- Country: Bangladesh
- Language: Bengali

Sphulingo (transl. Spark; Bengali: স্ফুলিঙ্গ) is a 2021 Bangladeshi film written and directed by Tauquir Ahmed. The story revolves around a rising independent music band formed by university students, exploring their family bonds, love, and conflicts, along with their patriotism inspired by Sheikh Mujib's ideals. The film draws parallels between the courage of young people who participated in Bangladesh's Liberation War and the struggles of contemporary youth. The main cast includes Shamol Mawla, Zakia Bari Momo, Pori Moni, Mamunur Rashid, Abul Hayat, Shahidul Alam Sachchu, Rawnak Hasan, Fakhrul Bashar Masum, and Hasnat Ripon.

On 11 December 2020, the development of the film began under the banner of Nakshatra Cholochitro and produced by Shopner Bangladesh Foundation. Filming took place over 26 working days in various locations in Gazipur, Brahmanbaria, and Manikganj. The music for the film was composed by Pintu Ghosh and Rokoni Iman, with post-production editing done in Kolkata. The film was released in Bangladesh on Independence Day in 2021 through Abhi Kathachitra and in U.S. theaters on 18 March 2022, distributed by Bioscope.

The film received acclaim for its unique plot, production, dialogue, authentic performances, and music. Sphulingo also earned the National Film Award for Best Dialogue.

== Plot ==
Partho, Irene, and Jafar are students at a contemporary Bangladeshi university. Partho is an economics student who writes poetry and sings in his spare time. Irene and Jafar, along with a few other classmates, are members of an amateur university music band, with Jafar as the lead vocalist. During a concert, a well-known musician, Raju, invites the band to perform with him. By chance, Partho ends up performing in Jafar's place. Impressed by their performance, Raju invites them to participate in an upcoming Victory Day concert. Irene then invites Partho to join their band and write a new original song for the Victory Day concert. Jafar, who is infatuated with Irene, struggles to accept this. To inspire the group, Partho encourages everyone to read books on Bangladesh's Liberation War and the works of Sheikh Mujibur Rahman. Partho also draws inspiration from watching the historic 7th March speech. As they read, everyone except Jafar imagines themselves as freedom fighters in training.

Partho visits his girlfriend Diba's house and discusses the country with her freedom-fighter father. Partho becomes deeply engaged in conversations about the Liberation War. The scene shifts to the past, depicting the Pakistani army's planned massacre on 25 March 1971. It also shows George Harrison and others performing the song "Bangla Desh" at the Concert for Bangladesh in New York's Madison Square Garden, raising awareness and support for the refugees. Recently, Partho performs this song at a concert, earning praise from the audience. However, Partho's teacher in the classroom disapproves of patriotic songs, labeling them as "political songs," and discourages Partho from singing, insisting that the university is a place for studies, not politics. The teacher often humiliates Partho in class.

Later, Partho and his friends are returning home late at night with banned drinks in their car when the police stop and interrogate them. The scene then shifts to 1971, where two young freedom fighters are among the passengers on a bus. The bus is stopped by Pakistani soldiers, who interrogate the passengers. When asked for their identity, the freedom fighters claim to be students and show their ID cards.

Partho's father is unable to receive his pension due to demands for a bribe at the government accounting office. When he goes to speak with the official in charge, Partho accompanies him. Despite their efforts, the official delays processing the pension because they refuse to pay the bribe. Frustrated, Partho loses his temper and physically confronts the accountant, but others intervene to stop him. Feeling despondent, Partho returns home and watches Sheikh Mujib's speech urging government employees to work for the welfare of the people.

Their music band is selected to perform at the Victory Day concert, and a celebration is held at Irene's house. Exhausted, Partho falls asleep there. Meanwhile, Diba's father falls ill and is admitted to the hospital. The next morning, Partho visits the hospital and apologizes to Diba for keeping his phone off and not being able to come during the crisis. Overhearing their conversation from his cabin, Diba's father senses their romantic relationship and later arranges for Diba to marry Asif.

Partho composes a patriotic song, but Jafar disapproves. Jafar's father, Azmat, urges Partho's teacher to suppress patriotic sentiments at the university. Irene and others plan to perform the song without Partho, but Jafar refuses. After they leave, Jafar confesses his feelings to Irene, but she rejects him. Irene, troubled by her mother's relationship with a younger man and her family's emotional distance, becomes depressed.

Meanwhile, Diba confesses her love to Asif. Partho intentionally fails his exam, leading to a university protest. Amid the chaos, Partho's father falls ill, and Partho and Diba decide to marry. Partho seeks a loan from Irene but finds her intoxicated and returns empty-handed. In a flashback, young freedom fighters are captured, tortured, and killed by the Pakistani army during the Siddhirganj operation for refusing to cooperate.

At the end, Partho is arrested for raping Irene. While in jail, he learns of his father's death and endures police interrogation and torture. Diba agrees to marry Asif in exchange for legal help to free Partho. The trial reveals Jafar, not Partho, as Irene's rapist. The university investigation shows Partho was deliberately failed in his exam. Azmat is arrested while trying to flee the country amid an investigation into his anti-Bangladesh activities. Asif breaks his promise and reunites Diba with Partho. At the Victory Day concert, Partho, Irene, Diba, and the band perform a patriotic song with Raju.

== Cast ==
- Shamol Mawla as Partha
- Pori Moni as Diba
- Rawnak Hasan as Asif
- Zakia Bari Momo as Airin
- Naresh Bhuiyan
- Abul Hayat
- Mamunur Rashid
- Shahidul Alam Sachchu

== Production ==
The film is the seventh film directed by Tauquir Ahmed. During the COVID-19 lockdown in the United States, Tauquir spent two months writing the screenplay. He prioritized casting regular stage and television actors for the film. On 9 December 2020, the film's announcement was made, revealing the main cast. Although Fazlur Rahman Babu was initially included, he ultimately did not participate. Abul Hayat, Shahidul Alam Sachchu, and Raonak Hasan, who had previously worked with Tauquir on Fagun Haway, were cast again for Sphulingo.

The development of the film began on 11 December, primarily in various locations in Gazipur district. Indoor scenes were shot at Nakkhatra Bari in Rajendrapur, while outdoor scenes were filmed in locations such as Madhumati Model Town, the Martyred Intellectuals Memorial, the Shitalakkhya River in Kapasia, Bangabandhu Sheikh Mujibur Rahman Agricultural University, and Kharera village in Kasba, Brahmanbaria. Some scenes included the use of a bus from the Bangladesh Liberation War, with these scenes shot in Manikganj. Cinematography by Enamul Haque Sohel completed the filming in 26 days. Post-production, including editing by Amit Debnath, and some additional work, was done in Kolkata. The film's dialogue was translated into English by Arib Ahmed and Mousumi Roy Chowdhury.

== Music ==
The music composition, arrangement, and direction were handled by Pintu Ghosh and Rokon Emon. Pintu Ghosh had previously worked on the music for Tauquir Ahmed's films Oggatonama, Haldaa, and Fagun Haway. For Sphulingo, three original songs were created, along with a re-arrangement of George Harrison's "Bangla Desh," performed during the 1971 Concert for Bangladesh. The film also features songs by Lalon, Shah Abdul Karim, Hason Raja, Apel Mahmood, Khyapa Baul, and Rizvi. The original songs were released on YouTube in the channel of Tiger Media.

=== Track listing ===
Sphulingo
No.	Title	Lyrics	Singer(s)	Length
1.	"Tomar Name"	Pintu Ghosh	Pintu Ghosh, Muttaki Hasib, Sukanya Majumdar Ghosh, Basma Kazi, and Rokon Emon.	4:31
2.	"Ek Mujib"	Someshwar Oli	Muttaki Hasib and Pintu Ghosh	3:10
3.	"Bujhina"	Pintu Ghosh	Sukanya Majumdar Ghosh and Pintu Ghosh	4:37
4.	"Bangla Desh"	George Harrison	Muttaki Hasib	3:57
Total length:				16:15

== Marketing and release ==
The promotion of the film was limited to the release of its trailer, posters, and interviews with the cast and crew. Unlike other films directed by Tauquir Ahmed, it did not receive a large-scale promotional campaign. On 1 March, a trailer was released featuring the historic 7 March speech, scenes from the Liberation War, and contemporary youth perspectives.

The Bangladesh Film Censor Board granted the film a clearance certificate on 14 March 2021. The planned release date was postponed twice, initially set for 17 March and later 19 March, before finally being released on 26 March, Bangladesh's Independence Day, in 35 theaters across the country, distributed by Avi Kathachitra. Following its theatrical run, the film was made available on the OTT platform Toffee. Sphulingo was also released internationally on 18 March 2022, in 23 theaters across the United States, distributed by Bioscope Films USA.

== Reception ==
Marzia Akter from Kaler Kantho praised Tauquir Ahmed for "seamlessly blending the philosophy and thoughts of the Father of the Nation with the Liberation War of 1971 and connecting them to the current generation." She commended the film's music, lighting, sound design, editing, and the performances of the lead actors Shyamol Mawla, Pori Moni, and Momo, as well as the supporting cast. However, she criticized the repetitive use of the same locations, which she felt disrupted the film's aesthetic and credibility, and mentioned that compromises in cinematography occasionally affected the film's continuity.

In a mixed review, Salahuddin Lavlu from Samakal characterized Sphulingo as a well-made film. He lauded the performances of all actors, particularly Pori Moni for her restrained acting, and positively highlighted Tauquir and Pintu's contributions to production management and music direction. However, he noted that the film's first half felt slow-paced, stating, "The gripping momentum that should have persisted from start to finish was somewhat lacking."

== Accolades ==
Award	Date of ceremony	Category	Recipient(s) and nominee(s)	Result	Ref.
Bangladesh National Film Awards	9 March 2023	Best Dialogue	Tauquir Ahmed	Won	
