= Rickshaw Girl =

- নাইমার রঙ
- Directed by: Amitabh Reza Chowdhury
- Screenplay by: Sharbari Zohra Ahmed; Nafiz Amin
- Based on: Rickshaw Girl by Mitali Perkins
- Produced by: Faridur Reza; Eric J. Adams; Ziauddin Adil; Assaduzzaman Sokal (EP)
- Starring: Novera Rahman; Allen Shubro; Momena Chowdhury; Champa
- Cinematography: Nicolas Rebarp; Tuhin Tamizul
- Edited by: Navnita Sen
- Music by: Debajyoti Mishra
- Production companies: Half Stop Down; Sleeperwave Films
- Distributed by: Shihab Shirazee
- Release dates: May 2021 (United States); 24 January 2025 (Bangladesh)
- Running time: 102 mins
- Countries: United States; Bangladesh
- Language: Bengali

Rickshaw Girl (In Bangladesh known as Naimar Rong) is a 2025 US-Bangladesh joint venture drama film, based on novel Rickshaw Girl by Indian-American author Mitali Perkins. The film was directed by Amitabh Reza Chowdhury and Executive Produced by Md Assaduzzaman Sokal from their Production company Half Stop Down. Novera Rahman played a titular role in the film. Shakib Khan was supposed to play a guest role in the film. But Later, the film director Amitabh Reza Chowdhury chose Siam Ahmed instead of Shakib Khan as he could not give time.

== Synopsis ==
A daring teen-aged girl disguises herself as a boy and pedals a rickshaw on the gritty streets of Dhaka, Bangladesh to earn extra cash for her struggling family, all while pursuing her dream of becoming an artist.

== Cast ==
- Novera Ahmed as Naima
- Momena Chowdhury as Sathi
- Naresh Bhuiyan as Selim
- Nasir Uddin Khan as Mamun
- Allen Shuvro as Barek
- Rupkotha
- Ashok Bepari
- Anwar Sayem
- Champa as Marium
- Siam Ahmed as Guest appearance

== Production ==
The principal photography of the film began on April 10, 2019 in Rajshahi. Subsequently, the film was shot in Pabna and Bangabandhu Film City in Gazipur. The film was completed in July 2019.

== Release ==
=== Screening ===
The film Rickshaw Girl was screened in 52 cities in 18 states of the United States throughout the month May 2022. The film was released on 24 January 2025 in Bangladesh.

== Reception ==
=== Critical response ===
On the review aggregator website Rotten Tomatoes, the film has an approval rating of 73%, with an average score of 6.8 out of 10, based on reviews from 11 critics.

The film won the Best of Fest award at the 39th International Children's Film Festival.
