= Kendua Upazila =

Kendua কেন্দুয়া
- Upazila
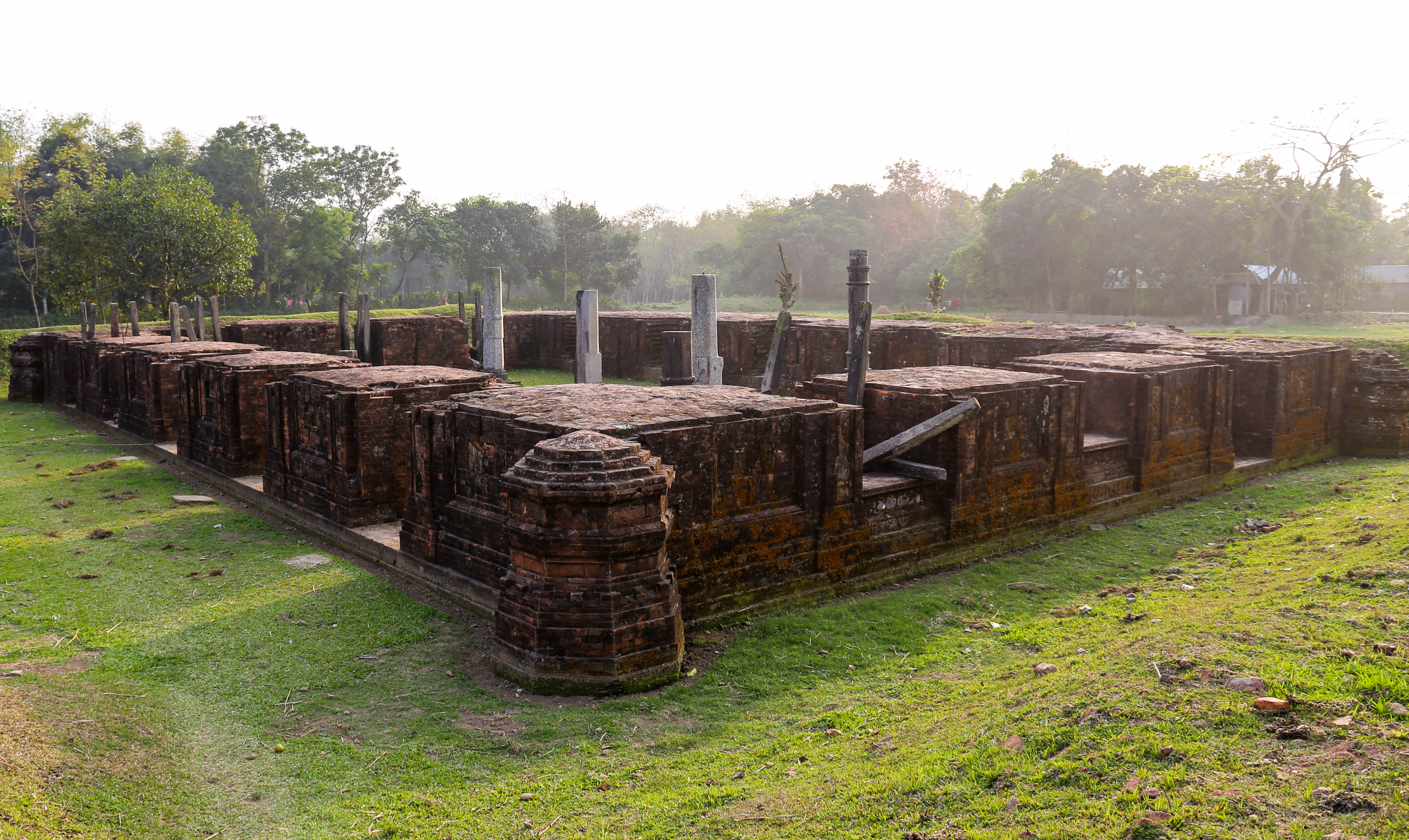
- Baraduari Mound, Royalbari

- Coordinates: 24°39′N 90°50.5′E
- Country: Bangladesh
- Division: Mymensingh
- District: Netrokona

Area
  - Total: 303.6 km^{2} (117.2 sq mi)

Population (2022)
  - Total: 316,976
  - Density: 1,044/km^{2} (2,704/sq mi)
- Time zone: UTC+6 (BST)
- Postal code: 2480
- Area code: 09528
- Website: kendua.netrokona.gov.bd

Kendua Upazila mauza geocode map

Kendua (Bengali: কেন্দুয়া) is an upazila of Netrokona District in the Division of Mymensingh, Bangladesh.

== Geography ==
Kendua is located at 24.6500°N 90.8417°E. It has 66133 households and total area 303.60 km^{2} (117.22 sq mi). The upazila is bounded by Netrokona Sadar and Atpara upazilas on the north, Tarail Upazila of Kishoreganj district on the south, Madan upazila on the east, Ishwarganj, Gauripur and Nandail upazilas on the west.

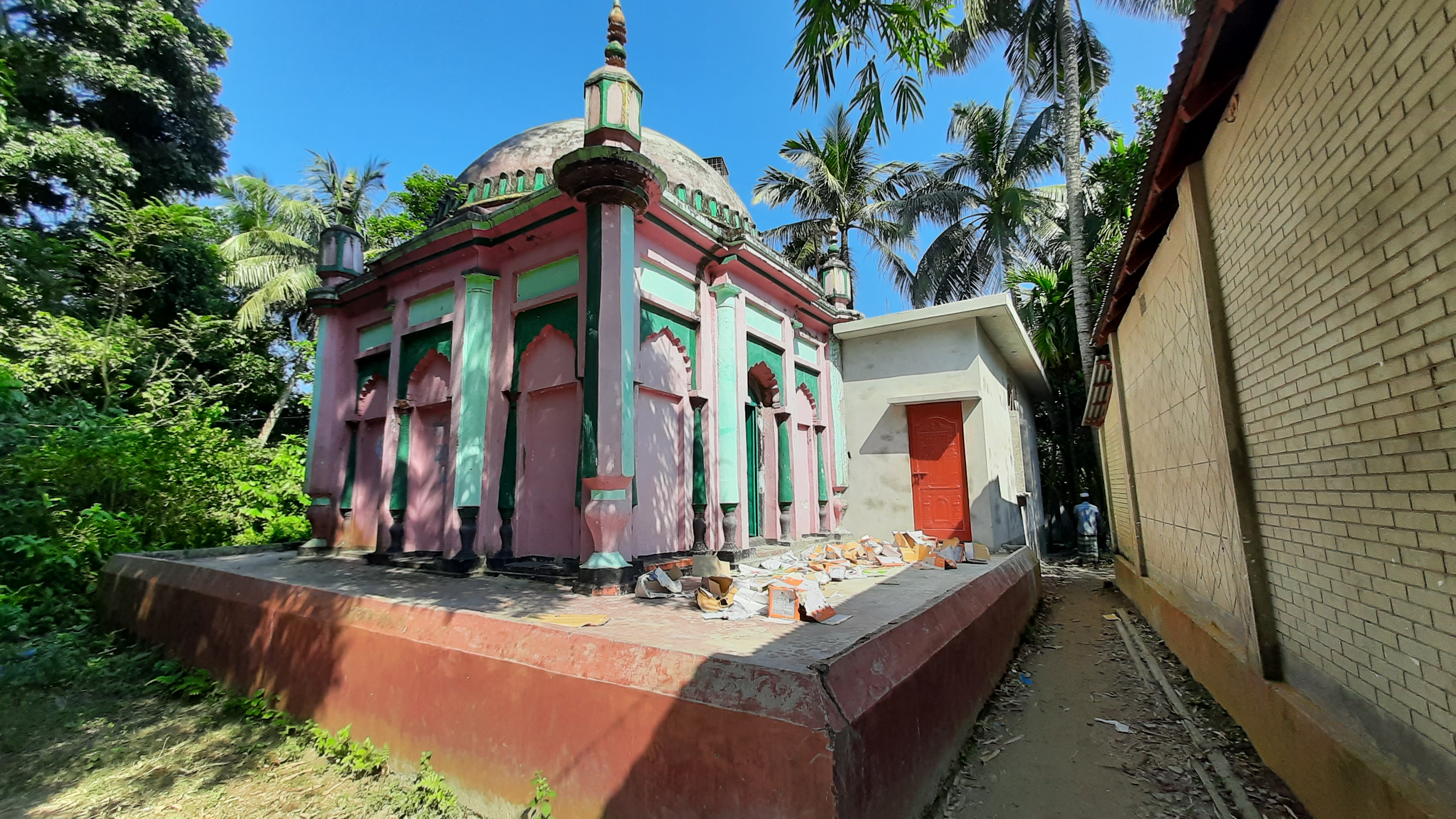
The Harulia Mosque in Kendua dates back to the 1200s

== Demographics ==
Historical population
Year	Pop.	±%
1981	233,109	—
1991	265,628	+14.0%
2001	286,594	+7.9%
2011	304,729	+6.3%
2022	316,938	+4.0%
Source: Bangladesh Bureau of Statistics

Religions in Kendua Upazila (2022)
Religion	Percent
Islam	96.44%
Hinduism	3.55%
Other or not stated	0.01%

According to the 2022 Bangladeshi census, Kendua Upazila had 76,127 households and a population of 316,976. 10.74% of the population were under 5 years of age. Kendua had a literacy rate (age 7 and over) of 64.90%: 66.16% for males and 63.75% for females, and a sex ratio of 93.14 males for 100 females. 34,922 (11.02%) lived in urban areas.

== Administration ==
Kendua Thana was formed 1890 and it was turned into an upazila in 1983.

Kendua Upazila is divided into Kendua Municipality and 13 union parishads: Asujia, Balaishimul, Chirang, Dalpa, Garadoba, Ganda, Kandiura, Mashka, Muzaffarpur, Noapara, Paikura, Roailbari, and Sandikona. The union parishads are subdivided into 217 mauzas and 289 villages.

Kendua Municipality is subdivided into 9 wards and 32 mahallas.

== Notable people ==
- Nalini Ranjan Sarkar
- Kuddus Boyati
- Raushan Yazdani, author and folklorist
- Chandra Kumar De, folklorist and writer
- Humayun Ahmed, Famous Bengali Novelist and film director
- Jalal Uddin Khan, author and folk lyricist

== See also ==
- Upazilas of Bangladesh
- Districts of Bangladesh
- Divisions of Bangladesh
