= Sharmin Sultana Sumi =

Bangladeshi singer-songwriter

Sharmin Sultana Sumi শারমিন সুলতানা সুমি
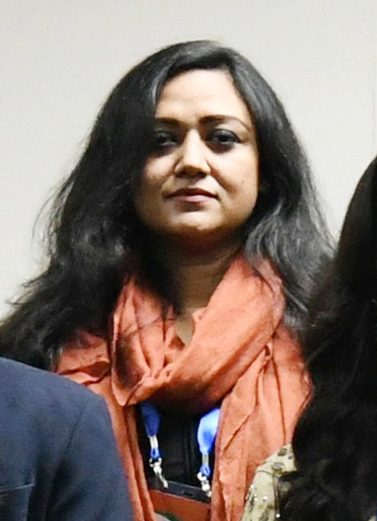
- Sumi in 2021

Background information
- Born: 16 September; Khulna, Bangladesh
- Origin: Dhaka, Bangladesh
- Genres: Pop; rock
- Occupations: Singer; songwriter
- Instrument: Vocal
- Years active: 2002–present
- Member of: Chirkutt

Sharmin Sultana Sumi is a Bangladeshi singer, songwriter, composer, and playback singer. She is the lead vocalist and founding member of the band Chirkutt, which she started in 2002. Sumi was the first Bangladeshi invited to participate in the Womex 21 music summit.

== Early life ==
Sumi was born in Khulna, Bangladesh.

== Career ==
Sumi formed Chirkutt in 2002. In addition to being the band's main vocalist, she is the writer and composer of most of their songs. She has written lyrics and music for other artists. She is also known as playback singer for doing playback for the film Aynabaji.

She wrote a tribute song for heavy metal guitarist Zeheen Ahmed after his sudden death in 2017.

She also wrote the lyrics for the song "Dhire Dhire" for Habib and Nancy which has crossed four million YouTube views.

== Discography ==
=== Playback movies ===
Year	Movies	Music director	Singer	Song	Note
2016	Aynabaji	Chirkutt	Sharmin Sultana Sumi	"Duniya"	
2016	Ice Cream			"Valo Thaka Mondo Thaka"	
2017	Doob	Chirkutt	Sharmin Sultana Sumi	"Ahare Jibon"	Nominations for Best Female Singer and Best Lyrics for 3rd East Filmfare Award
2017	Voyonkor Sundor	Chirkutt	Sharmin Sultana Sumi	"Ei Shohore Kaktao Jene Geche"	

== Personal life ==
Sumi's mother died of cervical cancer on 17 January 2022.

== Awards and nominations ==
Sumi was honored with Anannya Top Ten Awards by the Bangla Academy. The award was given to 10 people including Sumi by Ananya Magazine on behalf of Bangla Academy for their special contribution to the society. She also received nominations from 3rd Filmfare Awards East for Best Playback Singer and Best Lyrics.
