= Raushan Yazdani =

Bengali writer

Mohammad Raushan Yazdani
- রওশন ইজদানী
- Born: February 27, 1917; Bidyaballabh, Kendua, Mymensingh District, Bengal Presidency (now in Netrokona District, Bangladesh)
- Died: June 23, 1967 (aged 49); Bidyaballabh, Mymensingh District, Dacca Division, East Pakistan
- Known for: Folk research
- Spouse: Zubaydah Akhtar Khatun
- Children: 3
- Awards: Adamjee Literary Award

Academic background
- Education: Ashujia High School

Mohammad Raushan Yazdani (Bengali: মোহাম্মদ রওশন ইজদানী) was a Bengali author and researcher of folk literature. As a folklorist, his work was crucial due to his discoveries of tales and poems from the remotest villages of eastern Bengal (now Bangladesh). His most celebrated work is Momenshahir Loka-Sahitya dedicated to folk literature in Momenshahi (Mymensingh) Yazdani was one of the most popular Bengali poets in the Pakistan period.

== Early life and education ==
Yazdani was born in the village of Bidyaballabh, Kendua in the District of Mymensingh (now in Netrokona District) on 15 Falgun 1324 BS (1917 AD). His father, Shaykh Ali Kabir, was a practitioner of alternative medicine. After completing primary education at a local Old Scheme Madrasa, Yazdani studied in Ashujia Joy Nath Coronation High School until class 10. Around this time at the age of 18, his mother died and Yazdani became negligent of his education and started accompanying syncretic mystics. Yazdani eventually left these mystics, returning to orthodox Sunni Islam after marrying Zubaydah Akhtar Khatun, a Bengali Muslim woman with whom he started a family.

== Career ==
সন্ধ্যা ঘনিয়ে এলো বেলা গেল ঐ
Shondha ghoniye elo bela gelo oi
কোথায় গেল হাঁসগুলো তৈ তৈ তৈ
Kothay gelo haashgulo toi toi toi

— Two famous lines from a children's poem by Yazdani.

Yazdani had taken on multiple career paths throughout his life. He started working as a primary school teacher at a village in 1940. Shortly afterwards, he became a clerk of the Debt Settlement Board. He later began his career in grade one proofreading for Franklin Publications in 1956 as well as The Azad. He left his job as a proofreader in 1959 due to ill health and returned to his village home and devoted himself to literary pursuits. He was inspired by the likes of Kazi Nazrul Islam and Jasimuddin as well as the rich puthi literature (Dobhashi poetry) of Bengal. His poetry focused much on the glory of Muslims as well as village life. Poems about the latter include Chinu Bibi and Rongila Bondhu. Some of his poems were about rebellion like Bojrobani.

With a growing hobby of collecting Bengali language folk literature, Yazdani became known as a folklorist. He started writing essays on folk literature which were published in popular journals and newspapers. He was awarded the Adamjee Literary Award by the President of Pakistan Ayub Khan in 1959. This was for writing Khatamun Nabiyyeen (Seal of the Prophets), a biographical poem on Muhammad, the final Islamic prophet in verse. This poem was later translated to English as The Word of God.

== Works ==
Yazdani's literary work includes 27 published and 18 unpublished books. His most famous works are those relating to folk literature:

- Momenshahir Lokshahitto (1951)
- Purbo Pakistaner Lokshahitto (1966)

He also wrote poems, namely:

- Bojrobani (Words of Lightning) - 1947
- Chinubibi - 1951
- Rongila Bondhu (Colourful Friend) - 1951
- Khaatamun Nabiyyeen (Seal of the Prophets) - 1960
- Yusuf Zulaykha (Joseph and Potiphar's wife)

Other writings:

- Bhangabeena (Broken Harp) - 1944
- Neel Doriya (Blue Sea) - 1946
- Rahgeer (Passerby) - 1949
- Islam Jahaner Dui Setara (Two Stars of the Islamic World)
- Khulafa-i-Rashideen (Rightly Guided Caliphs)
- Morur Kafela (Desert Caravan)
- Hridoy Beena (Harp of the Heart)
- Momenshahir Prachin Polli O Shomaj Jibon (Momenshahi's Ancient Rurality and Social Life)

== Death and legacy ==
Yazdani died in his native village on 23 June 1967 at 8:30am. Prior to his death, he had been invited to the world's first folklore conference at Indiana University in the United States in 1968 as a researcher, collector and composer of East Pakistani folklore. He left behind two sons and a daughter.

An educational institution in his name was established in Kendua in the year 1965 - the Rowshan Ijdani Academy. Thousands of fans gathered at an evening celebrating his works at the Raushan Yazdani Academy in his village in 2013. His grandson, Muhammad Mizanur Rahman Yazdani, is also a poet.
