= Jalal Uddin Khan =

Baul Shadhok Jalal Uddin Khan
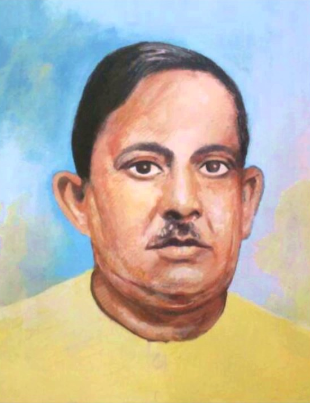
- Born: 25 April 1894; Kendua Upazila, Netrakona, British India
- Died: 31 July 1972 (aged 78)
- Occupation(s): Musician, composer

Jalal Uddin Khan (Bengali: জালাল উদ্দিন খাঁ; 25 April 1894 — 31 July 1972) was a Bangladeshi composer of Baul Song from Kendua Upazila, Netrakona. His father's name was Shadaruddin Khan. Influenced by the songs of Baul Rashid Uddin, he started composing folk and Sufi music in 1922 and composed around 500 songs. In 2005, his songs were published in five volumes as Jalalgeetika Shamagra edited by Jatin Sarker. A two-day Jalal Mela is organized every two years in his native village on the occasion of his birthday to commemorate him. In 2024, a vast program was organized by Kendua Upazilla Authority on this occasion. He was posthumously awarded Ekushey Padak in 2024 in the musician category.
