= Radio Bhumi =

Coordinates: 23.7687°N 90.4000°E

- Dhaka; Bangladesh
- Frequency: 92.8 MHz

Programming
- Language: Bengali

Ownership
- Owner: Impress Group

History
- First air date: 30 September 2012; 13 years ago

Links
- Website: radiobhumi.com

Radio Bhumi (92.8 FM) is a Dhaka-based private radio station in Bangladesh. It is well known for its sports commentary coverage. It is a subsidiary of the Impress Group, and a sister concern to the Channel i television network. The station began transmission on 30 September 2012. But nowadays, radio stations are not doing well in Bangladesh, and people are not very listening to radio.
