= Alpana Habib =

Bangladeshi chef and cookbook writer

Alpana Habib আলপনা হাবিব
- Born: 26 September 1966 (age 59); Birmingham, United Kingdom
- Education: Dhaka University
- Occupations: Chef Expert; Cookbook Writer
- Spouse: Syed Ahsan Habib
- Children: 2
- Website: www.alpanahabib.com

Alpana Habib is a Bangladeshi chef and cookbook writer.

== Biography ==
Alpana Habib was born on 26 September 1966 in Birmingham, United Kingdom. She was brought up in Dhaka, Bangladesh. She studied in Holy Cross Girls' High School and Holy Cross College. She was a student in Dhaka University's Psychology Department.

Though she is a chef, she has worked in Thai Airways International and Singapore Airlines. She started cooking when she was in Class Six. She has run a cook school. Her cooking programs were broadcast by Desh TV, NTV, ATN Bangla and Deepto TV too. She opened her YouTube channel in 2012. Her cooking videos are viewed more than 200 million times. She also worked as a judge of "Teer Little Chef" in Duronto TV.

She was awarded ‘Inspiring Women in Culinary Arts’ by Women in Leadership and Brand Forum. On 13 May 2018 her bilingual book Alpana's Cooking (Bangla:আলপনার রান্না) was unveiled. The book was edited and translated by Ashfaque Swapon. For this book she was awarded Gourmand World Cookbook Awards 2019.

She married Syed Ahsan Habib who is an electrical engineer. They have two children. Their names are Aritri and Adrit.
