= Ahmed Rubel =

Bangladeshi actor (1968–2024)

- আহমেদ রুবেল
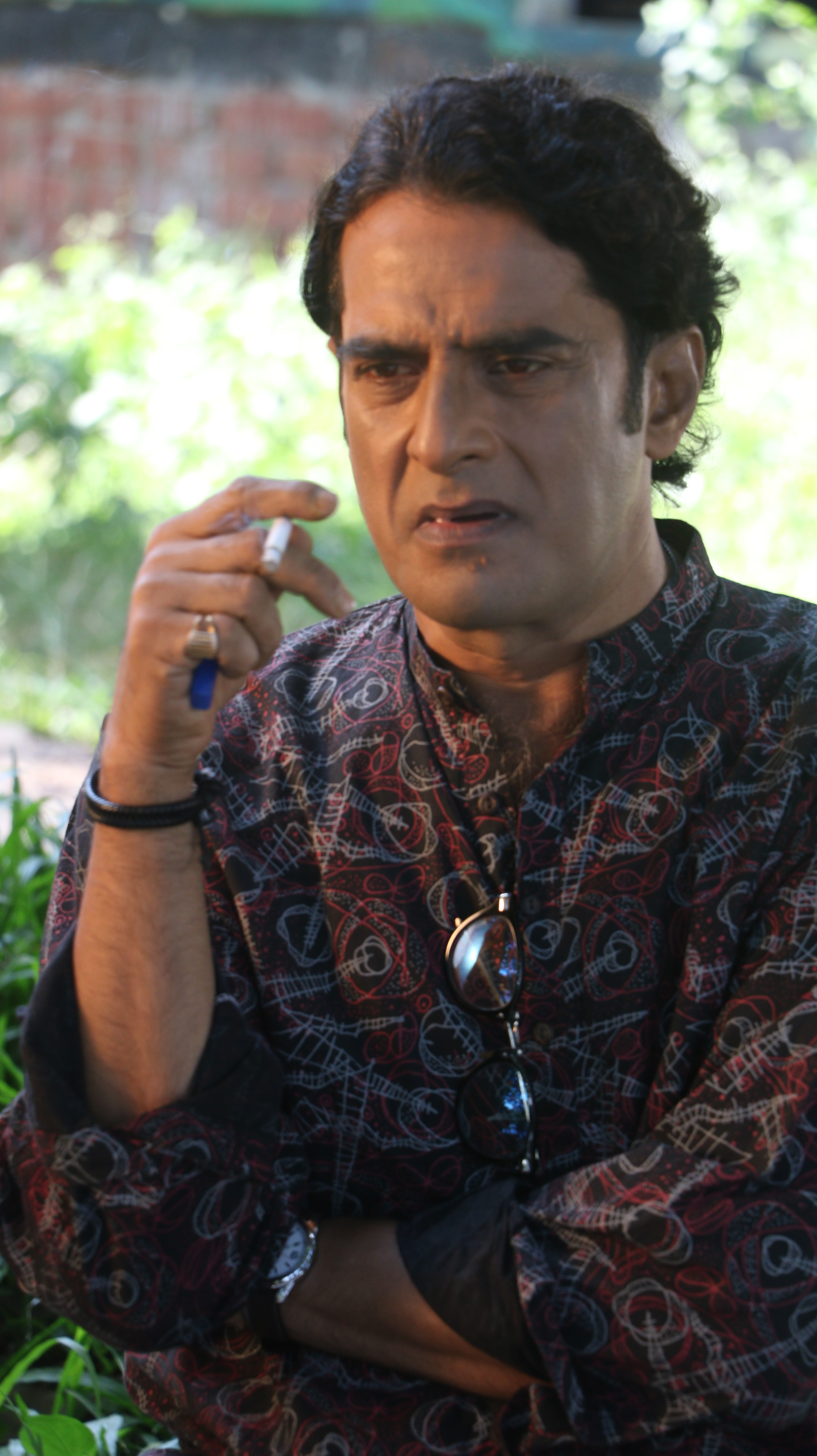
- Ahmed Rubel on the set of Antorborti in 2023
- Born: Ahmed Reza Rubel; 3 May 1968; Rajshahi District, East Pakistan, Pakistan
- Died: 7 February 2024 (aged 55); Dhaka, Bangladesh
- Occupation: Actor
- Spouse: Tarana Halim

Ahmed Reza Rubel (03 May 1968–7 February 2024) was a Bangladeshi theatre, film and television actor. He started his career in Selim Al Deen's theatre group Dhaka Theatre. Later he concentrated on mainstream commercial cinema, starring in six feature films. Rubel then left the film industry to work in tele-dramas.

== Early life ==
Ahmed Rezaul Islam (Ruble/Rubel) was born on 5 October 1968.

== Career ==
Rubel started his career working for Dhaka Theatre, a theatre group of Selim Al Deen. Then he moved to act in commercial Bengali movies. He starred in the movie Aakhri Hamla and played in a negative role in his subsequent movie. He came back to theatre again to work in Bonopangshul, a theatrical drama. At this point he moved to television dramas by director Aatiqul Huq Chowdhury. His first appearance in television was Giyasuddin Selim's Swapnojatra. He followed in Humayun Ahmed's Eid drama Pushpo Kotha where he played the character Ghora Mojid. He came to limelight in Ekushey Television serial Pret, which was based on Muhammad Zafar Iqbal's novel by the same name and directed by Aahir Alam. Rubel continued working in television with Mostofa Sarwar Farooki and others.

Rubel also worked in Humayun Ahmed's Bangladesh Liberation War-related movie Shyamol Chhaya.

His last screen appearance is in a lead role in Antorborti, directed by S M Kayum. Filming wrapped in 2024.

== Death ==
Rubel died on 7 February 2024, at the age of 55, from cardiac arrest.

== Filmography ==
- Ke Oporadhi (1997)
- Meghla Akash (2001)
- Chandrokotha (2003)
- Bachelor (2004)
- Shyamol Chhaya (2004)
- The Last Thakur (2008)
- Guerrilla (2011)
- Jonakir Aalo (2014)
- Parapaar (2014)
- Poush Maser Pirit (2016)
- Alatchakra: Circle of Desire (2021)
- Laal Moroger Jhuti (2021)
- Chiranjeeb Mujib (2021)
- Peyarar Subash (2024)
- Mona: Jinn-2 (2024)
- Antorborti (TBA)

=== Television appearances ===
- Pret (2001)
- Zindabahar (2022)

=== Streaming series ===
- Noyon Rahasya-Feluda (2017)
- Bou Diaries (Spotlight) (2021)
- Kaiser (2022)

== Awards ==
List of awards and nominations
Year	Film	Award	Category	Result
2004	Chandrokotha	6th Meril Prothom Alo Awards	Best Film Actor, Critics Choice Awards	Won
