= Mujib Pardeshi =

Bangladeshi musician

- মুজিব পরদেশী
- Occupations: Musician, actor, music director

Mujib Pardeshi is a folk musician, film actor, and music director from Bangladesh.

== Biography ==
Pardeshi was born in Betka village in what is now Tongibari Upazila of Munshiganj District. He completed a bachelor's degree in English at Dhaka University.

He started his career as a tabla player before establishing himself as a singer and rising to eminence in the 1980s.

Pardeshi made his acting debut in the film Sukh, directed by Siraj Haider. After appearing in Firoz Al Mamun's Mohon Malar Banobas in the late 1980s, he took a long hiatus from acting. He worked as an assistant to film music directors Satya Saha, Subal Das, and Dhir Ali Miah. He was the music director for about 20 films, starting with Ashanto Dheu, and including Hafiz Uddin's Asati. He is well known for the song he wrote for hit film Beder Meye Josna.

Pardeshi has released 42 solo albums, the most successful of which was Bondi Karagarey. Well known for his folk singing, he has traveled abroad many times to perform for the Bangladeshi diaspora.

As of 2001, he was music director for Bangladesh Film Development Corporation and an assistant secretary in the Ministry of Information.

In 2017, he returned to the silver screen in Mostofa Sarwar Farooki's Doob: No Bed of Roses.

== Works ==
=== Notable songs ===
- Amar sona bondhu re (Bengali: আমার সোনা বন্ধুরে তুমি কোথায় রইলা রে)
- Ami Bondi Karagare (Bengali: আমি বন্দী কারাগারে)
- Kandis Na Re Bindia (Bengali: কান্দিস না রে বিন্দিয়া)
- Ami Kemon Kore Potro Likhi Go (Bengali: আমি কেমন করে পত্র লিখি গো)
- Ami Sopon Deikha ailam Bhobe, Doyal Bhover mayar Roii lam Dube
- Amar Moner Agun Jole Digun Tumare na paia
- Shada dile kada lagai geli (Bengali: সাদা দিলে কাঁদা লাগাই গেলি)
- Ame Jar Lagi Hoilam Onuragi
