= Aynabaji =

2016 film by Amitabh Reza Chowdhury

- Theatrical release poster
- আয়নাবাজি
- Directed by: Amitabh Reza Chowdhury
- Screenplay by: Anam Biswas; Gousul Alam Shawon; Rezaul Karim Refath
- Story by: Gousul Alam Shawon
- Produced by: Gousul Alam Shawon, Assaduzzaman Sokal
- Starring: Chanchal Chowdhury; Masuma Rahman Nabila; Partha Barua
- Cinematography: Rashed Zaman
- Edited by: Iqbal Ahsanul Kabir
- Music by: Indradip Dasgupta; Shayan Chowdhury Arnob
- Production companies: Content Matters; Half Stop Down
- Distributed by: Half Stop Down
- Release date: 30 September 2016
- Running time: 146 minutes
- Country: Bangladesh
- Language: Bengali
- Budget: ৳1.7 crore (equivalent to ৳2.9 crore or US$240,000 in 2024)
- Box office: ৳5.13 crore (equivalent to ৳8.8 crore or US$720,000 in 2024)

Aynabaji (Bengali: আয়নাবাজি pronounced [äɪ̯naːbäd͡ʒi]) is a Bangladeshi crime thriller film directed by Amitabh Reza Chowdhury and produced by Gousul Alam under the banner of Content Matters Production and film production company Half Stop Down owned by Amitabh Reza, Assaduzzaman Sokal and Mahjabin Reza.

The film follows the story of Ayna, a professional imposter who is hired to impersonate different individuals for financial gain. As Ayna delves deeper into his work, he becomes embroiled in a web of deceit, murder, and intrigue that threatens to unravel his life.The lead characters of the film are Chanchal Chowdhury, Masuma Rahman Nabila, and Partha Barua.

The film was released on 30 September 2016 and received critical acclaim for its storytelling, cinematography, and performances. Aynabaji is considered a milestone in Bangladeshi cinema, and is commonly cited by critics as one of the best South Asian films of 21st century. Aynabaji has received numerous awards and nominations, including the Best Film Award at the 2016 Dubai International Film Festival. Nominated for 11 awards at the 41st Bangladesh National Film Awards and won 7, including the awards for Best Director and Best Actor in a Leading Role, tying Matir Moina (2002) for the most awards won by a single film. It is the highest grossing Bangladeshi film of 2016 and as well as one of the highest grossing films of all time. It was remade into the Telugu language film Gayatri.

== Plot ==
Sharafat Karim Ayna runs a drama school for children in Old Dhaka, where he lives, everyone knows that he works as a cook on ships and occasionally goes away for two or three months. However, in reality, he is serving time in jail for convicted criminals and Gausul, the director of the local Hollywood studio, brings his orders. At the beginning of the film, we see Kuddus Siddiqui, a businessman accused in a women's abuse case, contacting his lawyer Gausul to get someone to work in the jail, Gausul tells Ayna. Ayna meets Kuddus and quickly learns his mannerisms. On the way to jail after receiving a prison sentence in court, Kuddus and Ayna swap places with the police in collusion; Ayna goes to jail and Kuddus parties and even drives around in front of the house of the victim Tanisha, the complainant, at night. When Saber Hossain, a reporter for the Daily Sakal Bela newspaper, went to interview Tanisha, she told him all this, and Saber then started investigating.

During the verdict of the case, Ayna, disguised as Kuddus, was taken out of jail and replaced with the real Kuddus on the way to the court; Saber, who was following them, saw all this but unfortunately failed to take a picture. Kuddus was acquitted in the case, and Ayna also returned home. While attending drama school, he met Hridi, a young woman from their neighborhood, who had started going there when Ayna was not there. Later, he often met Ayna in the streets and markets and talked to her. Meanwhile, reporter Saber tracked down Ayna and interrogated him, but Ayna skillfully avoided them.

Meanwhile, Ayna gets a new job, a crazy boy from a high-class family has killed their driver's son, Ayna has to be transferred to prison. But Saber has been waiting in front of Ayna's house since dawn to catch up with him. Ayna evades him by using various tricks and goes to jail, returning a few months later. After returning, Hridi comes to see him and reproaches him for leaving without telling him. Ayna tells him the story of the time when he went to the Caspian sea and was caught in a storm.

Tired of being followed by the reporter, Ayna moves to another place and starts living on the other side of the river. Hridi helps him find a place. Gradually, their relationship becomes closer. In the meantime, they decide to go on a trip to Sylhet; Ayna also decides to leave the world of crime. But on the morning of the departure, Nizam Sayeed's goons capture Ayna. Politician Nizam Sayeed Chowdhury has murdered a school teacher, and now he wants to send Ayna as his replacement in jail, but Ayna says that he has quit his job. Nizam tempts him with money, acting, etc. and finally forces him to work. Meanwhile, Hridi was waiting at the station. The train to Sylhet leaves, Ayna does not come, Hridi goes back with a broken heart. Ayna surrenders to the police dressed as Nizam Sayeed Chowdhury.

Reporter Saber started searching for Ayna after not finding him at his previous address. In the meantime, Nizam was sentenced to death by the court. The real Nizam fled, while Ayna remained in prison. Nizam later hired a goon to kill Gausul so that Ayna could not prove his real identity and would hang himself. Reporter Saber learned all about Ayna from Majnu, a shopkeeper in Puri, Mohalla. He met Hridi and told him everything. By then, Hridi's father had died of a stroke. Saber said that Ayna had first taken up acting about seven years ago to raise money for Ayna's mother's treatment, and later, even after his mother's death, she continued this work out of passion for acting. Hridi went to jail to meet Ayna and returned crying. Saber wanted to publish Ayna's news in the newspaper, but the editor refused.

In jail, the old prison guard Labu Mia occasionally talks to Ayna, who is disguised as Nizam. Ayna once persuades her fellow Labu Mia to act, playing the role of Nizam Sayeed Chowdhury. Ayna dresses up the simple-minded Labu Mia as Nizam, and then dresses up as Labu Mia himself, and escapes from jail.

At the end of the film, there are some scenes where Ayna calls Saber and tells him the real Nizam's address, and the police arrest him. In the final scene, Ayna and Hridi watch the children's play, Taser Desh, which they have taught.

== Cast ==
- Chanchal Chowdhury as Sharafat Karim Ayna / Nizam Sayeed Chowdhury
- Masuma Rahman Nabila as Hridi
- Partha Barua as Saber Hossain, a crime reporter of the newspaper Daily Sakal Bela
- Lutfur Rahman George as Kuddus Siddiqui, a dishonest businessman
- Gousul Alam Shawon as Gousul, Director of the Hollywood studio. He brought Ayna into the world of crime. Later, Nizam Sayeed's men killed him.
- Brindaban Das as Labu Mia, a prison officer
- Md. Khairul Bashar
- Showkot Usman
- Bijori Barkatullah as Saber's divorced wife
- Kanishk Chakraborty
- Iffat Trisha as Tanisha, victim of the torture by Kuddus Siddiqui
- Shahriar Ferdous Sajib as Majnu, Ayna's friend who works as a shopkeeper in Ayna's neighbourhood
- Jamil Hossain as Saber's manservant
- Kazi Rajesh
- Shariful Islam as the mail boy of Hollywood studio
- Shohel Mondol as Chatting customer at Majnu's shop
- Hasan Shahria
- H. M. Akhtar
- Tapan Majumder
- Ashfaquzzaman Bipul
- Mahfuzur Rahman
- Arifin Shuvoo as AC Sazzad (special appearance)
- Amitabh Reza Chowdhury as a prisoner in the last scene of the prison (special appearance)

== Production ==
Gousul Alam Shaon had written the story for the film, while Anam Biswas adapted into a screenplay. Esha Yusuf was the executive producer along with Assaduzzaman Sokal who was the line producer of the film while Amitabh Reza is the director of the movie. The entire film was shot in Dhaka. Shooting of the film officially began in February 2015 and ended in August 2015. The film was released on 30 September 2016.

== Soundtrack ==
The music for Aynabaji is composed by Arnob, Fuad, Habib and Chirkut Band.

No.	Title	Singer(s)	Length
1.	"Alu Piyaj er Kabbo"	Shaan	1:31
2.	"Dhire Dhire Jaw Na Somoy"	Habib Wahid, Anwesha Kushal Dattagupta	3:58
3.	"Duniya"	Chirkutt (Sharmin Sultana Sumi)	3:44
4.	"Ei Shohor Amar"	Shayan Chowdhury Arnob	3:29
5.	"Lag Velki Lag"	Fuad al Muqtadir, Johan Alamgir, Sheikh Istiaq	2:02

== Release ==
The film was released on 30 September 2016 in Dhaka and later in Chittagong and other cities. It was screened at Marché du Film at 69th annual Cannes Film Festival. Aynabaji has won the award of the best film at United States's 11th Seattle South Asian Film Festival. The movie was pirated after it was released on Robi online TV. The film had a limited release in theaters in the United States, France, Canada and Australia.

== Reception ==
Aynabaji received large positive reviews. The movie has received a good response from both critics and audience. Zahid Akbar from The Daily Star gave the film a 4 out of 5 star rating, saying "The film provides the viewers with an empathic view to its characters, which is coupled with brilliant storytelling making the audience wanting more." He praised the film for its story, cast, Chanchal Chowdhury's performance, and "impeccable" cinematography, but criticized the film for being too long.

=== Box office ===
Rafi Hossain of The Daily Star described it as "an instant blockbuster hit". It did a record 91 shows in 10 days, the highest number for any Bangladeshi film. With an occupancy record of 98.89%, in eight weeks it collected BDT 20.3 million.

== Awards ==
- Bangladesh National Film Awards 2016
  - Best Director
  - Best Actor
  - Best Screenplay
  - Best Cinematography
  - Best Editing
  - Best Sound Recording
  - Best Costume Design

== Spin-off and remake/influence ==
Aynabaji has a spin-off TV series titled Aynabaji-Original series. Gayatri an official Indian Telugu remake of Aynabaji has been released on 9 February 2018.

== See also ==
- List of Bangladeshi films of 2016
