= Incepta Pharmaceuticals =

Bangladeshi pharmaceutical company

Incepta Pharmaceuticals Limited
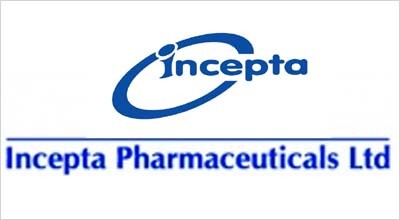
- Type: Private
- Industry: Pharmaceuticals Biotechnology
- Founded: 1999
- Headquarters: Shahid Tajuddin Ahmed Sarani, Tejgaon I/A, Dhaka, Bangladesh
- Key people: Abdul Muktadir (MD, Chairman)
- Revenue: ▲US$326 million (2020)
- Website: Official website

Incepta Pharmaceuticals Limited is a Bangladeshi pharmaceutical company based in Dhaka that manufactures and markets generic drugs and vaccines. Abdul Muktadir is the chairman of the company.

== History ==
Incepta was established in Dhaka, Bangladesh in 1999. The company has a manufacturing facility located at Zirabo, Savar. A second larger manufacturing facility has been built in Dhamrai.

The company sells its products in Bangladesh and also has begun exporting to both developed and developing countries around the world. The company is now concentrating its efforts in the area of export of Biological products like GCSF, EPO, Adalimumab, and vaccines.

In 2015, Incepta launched a generic version of sofosbuvir (Hopetavir) in the local Bangladeshi market.

In 2016, Incepta signed a deal with Bioengineering and German AMS Technology for a joint venture.

In 2021, incepta became the first Bangladeshi company to implement SAP ERP software to manage resources across their operations.

== Sponsorship ==
The company own the sponsorship rights of Rangpur Rangers for the 2019–20 Bangladesh Premier League.
