= Shariful Islam =

Bangladeshi cricketer (born 1995)

Personal information
- Born: 20 February 1995 (age 31); Comilla, Bangladesh
- Source: ESPNcricinfo, 21 April 2019

Shariful Islam (born 20 February 1995) is a Bangladeshi cricketer who plays as a middle-order batsman. He made his Twenty20 debut for Brothers Union in the 2018–19 Dhaka Premier Division Twenty20 Cricket League on 25 February 2019. He made his List A debut for Brothers Union in the 2018–19 Dhaka Premier Division Cricket League on 21 April 2019.
