= Chironjeeb Mujib =

2021 Bengali film based on life of Bangabandhu

- Bengali: চিরঞ্জীব মুজিব
- Directed by: Nazrul Islam
- Screenplay by: Juwel Mahmud
- Based on: The Unfinished Memoirs by Bangabandhu
- Produced by: Liton Haider
- Starring: Ahmed Rubel; Dilara Hanif Purnima; Khairul Alam Sabuj; S. M. Mohsin; Dilara Zaman; Azad Abul Kalam
- Music by: Emon Saha
- Production company: Haider Enterprise
- Distributed by: Sheikh Hasina; Sheikh Rehana
- Release date: 31 December 2021
- Running time: 136 mins
- Country: Bangladesh
- Language: Bengali
- Budget: ৳7 crore (US$570,000)

Chironjeeb Mujib (lit. 'Immortal Mujib') is a 2021 Bangladeshi Bengali-language biographical film directed by Nazrul Islam, former script writer of Bangladeshi prime minister. It stars Ahmed Rubel as Bangabandhu, the first President of Bangladesh and Father of the Nation. The film is based on a portion of The Unfinished Memoirs, written by Bangabandhu, which states his life from 1949 to 1952.

On 24 June 2021, Sheikh Hasina officially unveiled three posters of the film. The teaser came out on 18 October. Two months later, the movie's trailer came out. In January 2022, it was alleged that students at a college in Bogra were forced to watch the film.

== Cast ==
- Ahmed Rubel as Sheikh Mujibur Rahman (alias Bangabandhu)
- Dilara Hanif Purnima as Sheikh Fazilatunnesa Mujib
- Khairul Alam Sabuj as Sheikh Lutfar Rahman
- Dilara Zaman as Sayera Khatun
- S. M. Mohsin
- Azad Abul Kalam
- Shatabdi Wadud
- Shomu Chowdhury
- Arman Parvez Murad
- Shahjahan Shamrat
- Salim Ahamed
- Jewel Mahmud
- Naresh Bhuiyan
- Manosh Bandyopadhyay
- Kayes Chowdhury

== Production ==
Pre-production began four years before the film's release. On 11 January 2020, an agreement was signed to make the film. In September 2021, the film received certificate from the Censor Board.

- Cinematographer: Sahil Rony
- Music: Emon Saha

== Release ==
The film was released on the last day of 2021. The film was premiered in Bogra instead of Dhaka. The Modhuban Cineplex in Bogra was almost houseful that day.

== Music ==
Chironjeeb Mujib

Soundtrack album by Sabina Yasmin, Kumar Bishwajit, Konal, Nolok Babu, Kiran Chandra Roy
- Released: 2021
- Genre: Film music
- Language: Bengali
- Producer: Emon Saha
