= Channel i =

Bangladeshi TV channel

- Country: Bangladesh
- Broadcast area: Worldwide
- Headquarters: Tejgaon, Dhaka

Programming
- Picture format: 1080i HDTV (downscaled to 16:9 576i for SDTV sets)

Ownership
- Owner: Impress Group

History
- Launched: 1 October 1999; 27 years ago

Links
- Website: www.channelionline.com

Channel i (Bengali: চ্যানেল আই) is a Bangladeshi Bengali-language satellite and cable television channel owned by Impress Group. It was launched on 1 October 1999, as Bangladesh's first digital television channel. It is one of the oldest satellite television channels in Bangladesh. Channel i is broadcast via satellite television using PanAmSat and Bangabandhu-1, covering most of Asia and parts of Australia. It is sister to the radio station, Radio Bhumi.

== History ==
Prior to the establishment of the channel, Faridur Reza Sagar established Impress Telefilm, which initially produced small-mini series and one-off shows for state-owned Bangladesh Television. Channel i began broadcasting on 1 October 1999 from a small building in the Siddheshwari neighborhood of Dhaka, with the "Hridoye Bangladesh" (হৃদয়ে বাংলাদেশ; lit. 'Bangladesh in the heart') slogan, which is still used as of today. It initially broadcast pre-recorded television programs for 12 hours, but was converted to a 24-hour channel within two years of its launch.

On 1 October 2001, Channel i began airing news programming. The channel launched its website on 30 September 2003. Channel i's news director, Shykh Seraj, created Hridoye Mati O Manush, based on the old Bangladesh Television program Mati O Manush, which debuted on the channel on 21 February 2004. In March 2008, the channel began broadcasting Sisimpur to Bangladeshi children worldwide. Channel i had also broadcast modern western-themed telefilms, such as Play, directed by M-SIB, in 2010, thus making them the first Bangladeshi television channel to do so. On 11 June 2015, BBC Bangla's BBC Probaho premiered on Channel i.

Channel i was one of the nine Bangladeshi television channels to sign an agreement with Bdnews24.com to subscribe to a video-based news agency run by children called Prism in May 2016. Channel i began high definition broadcasts on 15 September 2017, and fully migrated from standard definition broadcasts on 1 October. For Bangladesh Television's 55th anniversary on 25 December 2019, Channel i organized a special program in its headquarters in Tejgaon, which was broadcast on both networks.

== Programming ==
=== Current and former ===
- 420
- BBC Bangladesh Shonglap
- BBC Probaho
- Channel i Music Awards
- Channel i Shera Kontho
- Channel i Shera Nachiye
- Dainik Tolpar
- Ekjon Mayaboti
- Ghor Kutum
- Hridoye Mati O Manush
- Khude Gaanraj
- Lux Channel I Superstar
- Priyo Din Priyo Rat
- Sakin Sarisuri
- Saat Bhai Champa
- Sonar Pakhi Rupar Pakhi
- Sisimpur
- Tritiyo Matra
- Vober Hat

== Related services ==
=== iScreen ===
iScreen is Impress Group's streaming service. It has films, web series, theaters, and stage plays. A series was blocked by the Bangladeshi censor board of the service. Another film was also censored.

== Audience share ==
In 2010, Channel i held a total audience share of 36%, tied with ATN Bangla. In urban areas, the channel had an audience share of 62%, the highest among privately owned channels in Bangladesh, and in metropolitan areas, it had a share of 61%. Channel i was ranked highest among most watched television channels in Bangladesh during its founding anniversary in 2013.

== See also ==
- List of television stations in Bangladesh
