= Hridoye Mati O Manush =

Bangladeshi TV series

Hridoye Mati O Manush (Bengali: হৃদয়ে মাটি ও মানুষ) is an agricultural TV series produced, presented and directed by Shykh Seraj, a private television channel in Bangladesh, which started broadcasting weekly every Saturday from February 21, 2004, at 9:50 pm. The program collects and broadcasts various agricultural information from the country as well as from outside of the country (Bangladesh).
