= Shykh Seraj =

Bangladeshi journalist

- শাইখ সিরাজ
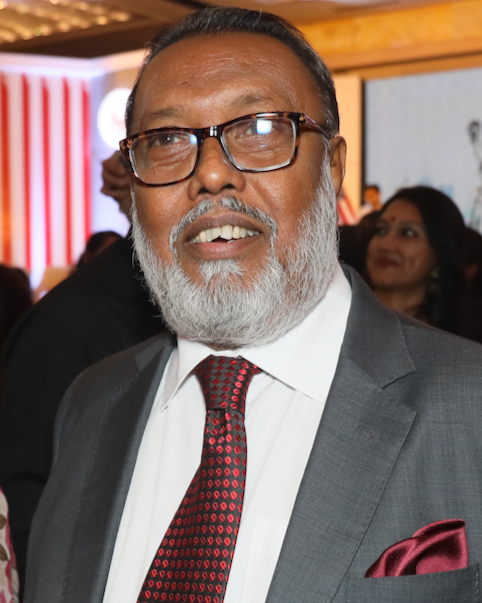
- Seraj in 2023
- Born: 7 September 1954 (age 72); Chandpur District, [Haimchar Upazila]
- Occupation: Journalist
- Years active: 1978-present
- Awards: Independence Award (2018); Ekushey Padak (1995)

Shykh Seraj (Bengali: শাইখ সিরাজ; born 7 September 1954) is a Bangladeshi journalist, media personality, and agriculture development activist. He was awarded the Ekushey Padak in 1995 and the Independence Award in 2018 by the government of Bangladesh.

== Early life ==
Seraj completed his SSC from Khilgaon Govt. High School and his HSC from Notre Dame College, Dhaka. Seraj earned his M.A. degree in geography from the University of Dhaka.

== Career ==
Seraj co-anchored a television series, Mati O Manush (Men and Soil), on Bangladesh Television starting in 1982. The television program featured investigative documentaries and in-depth reporting and pointed out solutions to the various problems that farmers face. In his work, Seraj visits remote areas, talks with farmers, conducts filming, searches for stories, and encourages young, educated generations to engage in farming. In 1999, he became the director of News at Channel i. In 2004, Seraj started a new programme at Channel i named Hridoye Mati O Manush (Soil and Men in Heart) based on the format of his earlier program Mati O Manush.

He hosted a show with former prime minister of Bangladesh Sheikh Hasina.

Seraj created a game show where contestants compete for best farm skills.

== Awards and honors ==
- Nattya Sheba Purashker, 1983
- Rotary International Award, 1989
- Rotary International Award, 1991
- US Ashoka Fellowship for poverty elimination television program (1992)
- Rotary International Award, 1993
- National Youth Award, 1993
- National Poultry Award, 1993
- National Fish Fortnight Award, 1994
- Presidents' Award on Agriculture, 1995
- Ekushey Padak (1995)
- National Fish Fortnight Award, 1996
- Rotary International Award, 1996
- Young Asia Television Award, 2002
- Sheltech Award, 2004
- Entertainment Screen Award 2004
- Cultural Reporters' Award 2004
- Rotary International Award, 2005
- Bangabandhu Gold Medal 2005
- Gold Medal in National Fish Fortnight Award 2005
- Gold Medal in Development of Economy 2005
- Dr. Ibrahim Memorial Gold Medal 2006
- Unitrend 'Son of the Soil' Award 2006
- Bangladesh Economic Association Gold Medal 2006
- World Food Program Media Award 2006
- Rotary International Award, 2007
- Honoured by Sir William Beveridge Foundation, 2009
- UNESCO Bangladesh Journalism Awards, 2009
- Rotary Seed Award, 2009
- A.H. Boerma Award by Food and Agriculture Organization of the UN (2009)
- Bangladesh Economic Association Gold Medal
- UK's BCA Golden Jubilee Honour Award, 2010
- House of Commons Honorary Crest, 2011 (UK)
- Dr Ibrahim Memorial Gold Medal
- Ranada Prasad Saha Gold Medal
- Green Award from Birmingham community, 2015
- Gusi Peace Prize, 2015 (Philippines)
- Ranada Prasad Saha Gold Medal 2016
- Independence Day Award, (2018)
- Honorary Ambassador of Agriculture (2022)
