= Fagun Haway =

2019 historical drama film

- Theatrical Release Poster by Bipasha Hayat
- Bengali: ফাগুন হাওয়ায়
- Directed by: Tauquir Ahmed
- Written by: Tito Rahman
- Produced by: Faridur Reza Sagar Impress Telefilm Limited
- Starring: Siam Ahmed; Tisha; Abul Hayat; Yashpal Sharma; Afroza Banu; Fazlur Rahman Babu
- Cinematography: Enamul Haque Sohel
- Edited by: Amit Debnath
- Music by: Pinto Ghosh
- Release date: 15 February 2019
- Running time: 136 minutes
- Country: Bangladesh
- Language: Bengali

Fagun Haway (Bengali: ফাগুন ‍হাওয়ায়, lit. 'In Spring breeze') is a Bangladeshi historical drama film based on the novel Bou Kotha Kou by Tito Rahman. This movie is based on the Bengali language movement during 1952 in East Pakistan. This was the sixth film directed by Tauquir Ahmed simultaneously released in February 2019 at 52 cinema halls across the country.

Bangladesh Federation of Film Societies (BFFS) nominated this film for the Best International Feature Film category at the 92nd Academy Awards. Faridur Reza Sagar's Fagun Haway and Star Cineplex’s film No Dorai have jointly won the Bangladesh National Film Award for Best Film of 2019.

== Cast ==
- Siam Ahmed as Nasir
- Nusrat Imrose Tisha as Deepti
- Yashpal Sharma as Jamshed
- Abul Hayat as Deepti's grandfather
- Afroza Banu as Nasir's mother
- Rawnak Hasan as Obayed
- Saju Khadem as Manju
- Fazlur Rahman Babu as Chandor
- Shahidul Alam Sachchu as Amzad
- Faruque Ahmed as Moulvi
- A K Azad Shetu
- Naresh Bhuiyan
- Abdur Rahim
- Hasan Ahmed
- Siam Hasan Redoy as Noyon Babu

== Awards ==
Bangladesh National Film Award for Best Film of 2019.
