= Amitabh Reza Chowdhury =

Bangladeshi Filmmaker

- অমিতাভ রেজা চৌধুরী
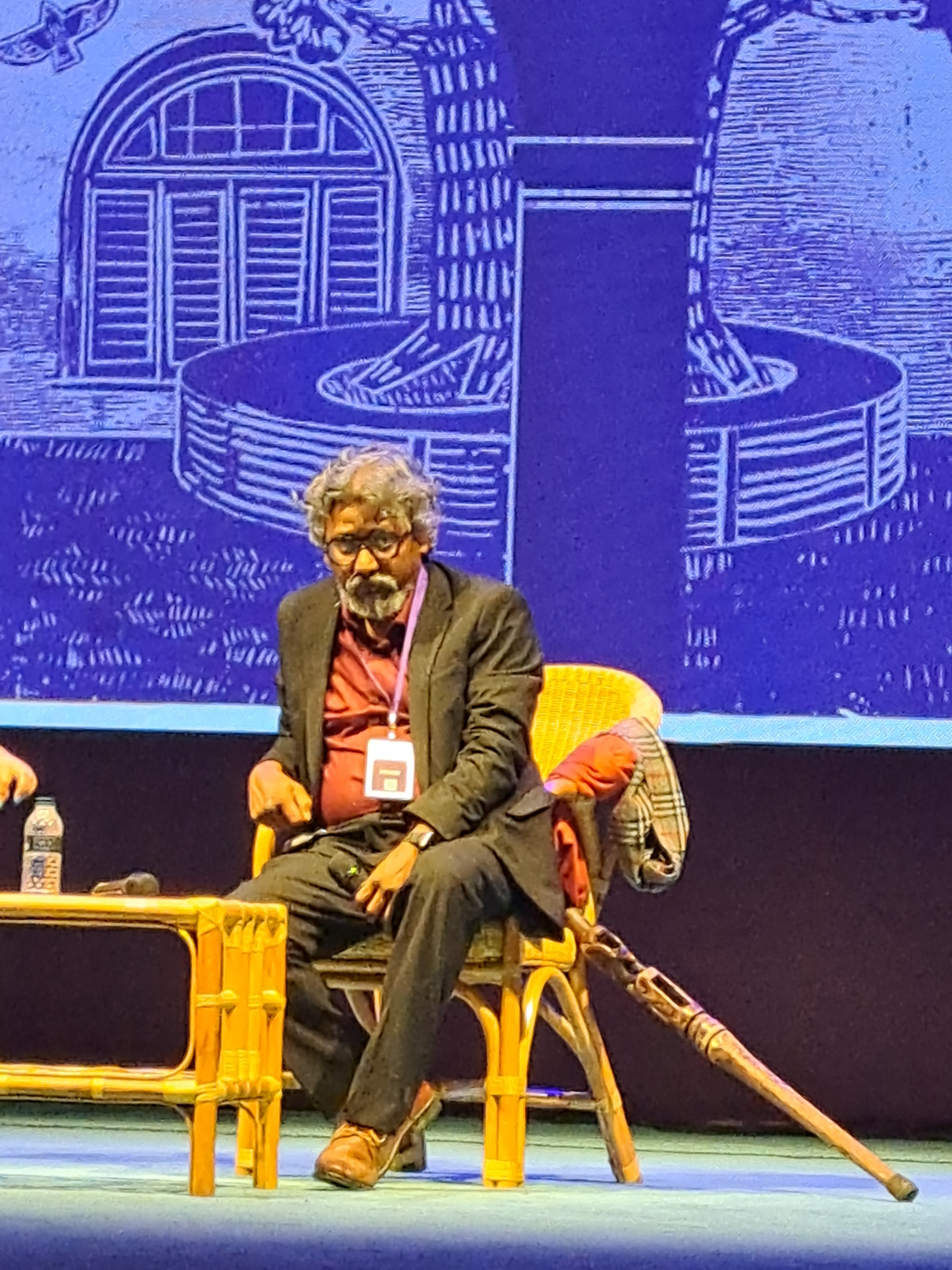
- Chowdhury in 2023
- Occupation: Filmmaker
- Years active: 2001–present
- Spouses: Nowrin Jahan Khan Jenny (m. 2007; div. 2009); Zakia Rashid Meem (m. 2014; div. 2016); Mushfica Masud (m. 2025)

Amitabh Reza Chowdhury is a Bangladeshi filmmaker. In his career, he has directed nearly fifteen hundred television commercials (henceforth TVCs). Amitabh has also directed a few television films to critical acclaim. He founded the production house 'half stop down', which mainly produces TVCs. Amitabh's directorial debut in theatrical feature film is Aynabaji which was released on 30 September 2016. (Note: multiple sources:)

== Early life ==
Chowdhury was born to a middle-class family in 1976. His hometown is Kishorganj, Bangladesh. He passed his HSC from BAF Shaheen College Dhaka. He went to Pune, India to study economics. While there, he studied literature on his own to aid his dream about making films.

== Career ==
After returning to Bangladesh, Chowdhury made a television film named Hawa Ghar (1999) under Maasranga Production which gained popularity. After Hawa Ghar he directed the first 20-episodes of the TV series Bondhon (2001-2002) under Maasranga Production. Following the success of Hawa Ghar and Bondhon, he received offers from agencies to make television commercials. He is now one of the leading directors of TVCs in Bangladesh. A number of his productions have been screened in other countries as well. He, his sister Mahjabin Reza and Md Assaduzzaman are owners of the production company "Half Stop Down". Under his production house he made more than 12 television films, followed by his first theatrical feature film. He has also worked as adjunct faculty in the Television, Film & Photography Department of the University of Dhaka.

== Personal life ==
Chowdhury's first wife was actress Nowrin Hasan Khan Jenny, whom he married in 2007 and divorced in 2009.

In January 2014, Chowdhury married Meem Rashid, the younger sister of singer Rafiath Rashid Mithila. They got divorced in 2016.

In November 2025, Chowdhury married Mushfica Masud in New York. Masud is a filmmaker and educated from Feirstein Graduate School of Cinema of Brooklyn College.

== Filmography ==
Chowdhury's debut film as a director was Aynabaji (2016). (Note: multiple sources:) The film was a major success in the box office, and it was screened in movie halls across the country for next few months. However, it was not profitable for the producer. His upcoming films include "Rickshaw Girl" and "Punorujjibon". Aynabaji was screened at Marché du Film at 69th annual Cannes Film Festival, where it scored well. Aynabaji has won the award of the best film at the United States' 11th Seattle South Asian Film Festival. His next film was Munshigiri, released digitally by Chorki in 2021.

=== Films ===
Title	Year	Director	Producer	Screenwriter	Notes
Hawa Ghar	1999	Yes	Yes	Yes	
Aynabaji	2016	Yes	Yes	Yes	
Munshigiri	2021	Yes	Yes	Yes	
Rickshaw Girl	2025	Yes	Yes	Yes	

=== TV and web series ===
Title	Year	Director	Producer	Screenwriter	Notes	Ref.
Bondhon	2001–2002	Yes	Yes	Yes	Series on Hoichoi	
Dhaka Metro	2016	Yes	Yes	Yes	Series on Hoichoi	
Bodh	2022	Yes	Yes	Yes	Series on Hoichoi	
Shon Shon	2022	Yes	Yes	Yes	Short film on Binge	
Bohemian Ghora	2025	Yes	No	Yes	Series on Hoichoi	

== Jury Board Member ==
Amitabh Reza Chowdhury has been a jury member at several film festivals, offering his insight and expertise to support new talents in the film industry.

- Dhaka International Mobile Film Festival (DIMFF): In 2021, Chowdhury was invited to be a jury member for the 7th Dhaka International Mobile Film Festival. This festival highlights films shot entirely on mobile devices, fostering creativity and innovation in digital filmmaking.
- 11th International Children's Film Festival (2018): Chowdhury served on the jury for the 11th International Children's Film Festival. His role involved evaluating films that cater to young audiences, promoting the importance of children’s cinema in inspiring and educating the next generation.
- JU Independent Film Festival: In 2022, Chowdhury was selected as a jury member at the Jahangirnagar University Independent Film Festival. This festival celebrates independent films and provides a platform for up-and-coming filmmakers to showcase their work.
- Sylhet Film Festival: Amitabh Reza Chowdhury was also a member of the jury at the 4th Sylhet Film Festival in 2020. His role in this festival focused on reviewing and recognizing films from a diverse range of genres, contributing to the growth of new filmmakers in Bangladesh.

== Recognition and awards ==
Chowdhury received a number of national and international awards for his work. He was awarded with the Meril-Prothom Alo Best Film Director Award in 2017. He also received the Best Film Award in Seattle South Asian Film Festival in 2016 for Aynabaji.

=== National Film Award ===
- Best Director (2016): Chowdhury received the prestigious National Film Award for Best Director for his work on the film Aynabaji, which earned critical and commercial success.

=== Meril Prothom Alo Awards ===
- Best Director (TV) 2008: Chowdhury was recognized as the Best Director in the television category for his exceptional work on television dramas.
- Best Screenplay Writer (TV) 2008: He also received the award for Best Screenplay Writer in television during the same year.
- Best TV Drama Director (Critics Award) 2014: In 2014, he won the Critics Award for Best TV Drama Director, acknowledging his outstanding direction in television dramas.
- Best Film Director (Critics Award) 2016: Amitabh Reza Chowdhury was honored with the Critics Award for Best Film Director for his film Aynabaji at the Meril Prothom Alo Awards.

=== BIFA Awards ===
- Best OTT Director (Jury Board) 2026: he received the award jointly with Vicky Zahed, he received for the web series Bohemian Ghora (2025) and Vicky Zahed received the award for Chokro 2 in same category.
