= List of Bangladeshi film artists =

This article is a list of Bangladeshi famous film artists.

== A ==
- Achol
- Rosy Afsari
- Bulbul Ahmed
- Ferdous Ahmed
- Inam Ahmed
- Jahanara Ahmed
- Mahfuz Ahmed
- Momtazuddin Ahmed
- Munmun Ahmed
- Mizu Ahmed
- Nadia Ahmed
- Quazi Nawshaba Ahmed
- Saifuddin Ahmed
- Saleh Ahmed
- Sharmili Ahmed
- Shila Ahmed
- Siam Ahmed
- Tania Ahmed
- Tauquir Ahmed
- Jaya Ahsan
- Shawkat Akbar
- Nipun Akter
- Al Mamun Al Siyam
- Alamgir
- Akhi Alamgir
- Niloy Alamgir
- Farid Ali
- Samroj Ajmi Alvi
- Shaina Amin
- Litu Anam
- Black Anwar
- Dolly Anwar
- Nazma Anwar
- Ziaul Faruq Apurba
- Raisul Islam Asad
- Afshan Azad
- Azim
- Masum Aziz

== B ==
- Farida Akhtar Babita
- Nurul Islam Bablu
- Fazlur Rahman Babu
- Nazmul Huda Bachchu
- Sadek Bachchu
- Azmeri Haque Badhon
- Pijush Bandyopadhyay
- Bapparaj
- Bijori Barkatullah
- Afiea Nusrat Barsha
- Anwara Begum
- Malay Bhowmick
- Afsana Ara Bindu
- Peya Bipasha
- Amalendu Biswas
- Apu Biswas
- Aruna Biswas
- Jyotsna Biswas
- Moutushi Biswas
- Amol Bose
- Tania Brishty
- Shabnom Bubly

== C ==
- Challenger
- Jayanta Chattopadhyay
- Puja Cherry
- Bappy Chowdhury
- Chanchal Chowdhury
- Iftakar Chowdhury
- Joy Chowdhury
- Mehazabien Chowdhury
- Champa
- Chandni
- Ishrat Jahan Chaity
- Naznin Hasan Chumki

== D ==
- Tony Dias
- Prarthana Fardin Dighi
- Dildar
- Mujibur Rahman Dilu
- Intekhab Dinar
- Dipjol
- Sumita Devi
- Parveen Sultana Diti
- Syed Dulal
- Subhash Dutta

== E ==
- Eka
- Tasnova Hoque Elvin
- Mamnun Hasan Emon
- Lucky Enam

== F ==
- Nusraat Faria
- Sabnam Faria
- Humayun Faridi
- Tasnia Farin
- Farooque

== G ==
- Gangua
- Leesa Gazi
- Anju Ghosh
- Aparna Ghosh
- Lucy Tripti Gomes
- Olivia Gomez
- Chitralekha Guho

== H ==
- Azizul Hakim
- Bobby Haque
- Enamul Haque
- Amit Hasan
- Rawnak Hasan
- Zahid Hasan
- Hashmot
- Abul Hayat
- Bipasha Hayat
- Afzal Hossain
- Amjad Hossain
- Anwar Hossain
- Jamaluddin Hossain
- Nirab Hossain
- Tarana Halim
- Falguni Hamid
- Moushumi Hamid
- Laila Hasan
- Konnie Huq

== I ==
- Syed Hasan Imam
- Zafar Iqbal
- Ejajul Islam
- Rahsaan Islam
- Shanta Islam
- Sirajul Islam
- Rumana Rashid Ishita

== J ==
- Tarin Jahan
- Ananta Jalil
- Rawshan Jamil
- Jashim
- Dolly Johur
- Falguni Rahman Jolly
- Wahida Mollick Jolly
- Shahriar Nazim Joy
- Jyotika Jyoti

== K ==
- Shakib Khan
- Jayasree Kabir
- Safa Kabir
- Kabori
- Shomi Kaiser
- Azad Abul Kalam
- Sunerah Binte Kamal
- Ilias Kanchan
- Aupee Karim
- Mosharraf Karim
- Tamalika Karmakar
- Keya
- Shaju Khadem
- Abul Khair
- Aisha Khan
- Amin Khan
- Adhora Khan
- Amin Khan
- Helal Khan
- Khaled Khan
- Khalil Ullah Khan
- Masud Ali Khan
- Mou Khan
- Rumana Khan
- Shiba Ali Khan
- Shakil Khan
- Tariq Anam Khan
- Tahsan Rahman Khan
- Tina Khan
- Zayed Khan
- Deepa Khandakar
- Khaleda Aktar Kolpona

== L ==
- Abdul Ali Lalu
- Salauddin Lavlu
- Fateh Lohani
- Ashish Kumar Louho
- Lima

== M ==
- Tawsif Mahbub
- Mahiya Mahi
- Ramendu Majumdar
- Shormi Mala
- Zakia Bari Mamo
- Abdullah al Mamun
- Manna
- Mim Mantasha
- Kazi Maruf
- Hasan Masood
- Ferdousi Mazumder
- Sabrin Saka Meem
- Farhana Mili
- Anisur Rahman Milon
- Bidya Sinha Saha Mim
- Nadia Afrin Mim
- Afsana Mimi
- Bonna Mirza
- Toma Mirza
- Rafiath Rashid Mithila
- Monira Mithu
- Prabir Mitra
- Mozeza Ashraf Monalisa
- Pori Moni
- Rowshanara Moni
- Keramat Moula
- Sadia Islam Mou
- Moushumi
- Moyuri
- Munmun
- Arman Parvez Murad
- Golam Mustafa
- Suborna Mustafa

== N ==
- Masuma Rahman Nabila
- Mousumi Nag
- Naila Nayem
- Nayeem
- Naresh Bhuiyan
- Shamima Nazneen
- Neelanjona Neela
- Afran Nisho
- Adil Hossain Nobel
- Asaduzzaman Noor
- Shajal Noor
- Mita Noor
- Sabila Nur
- Nuton

== O ==
- Jannatul Ferdous Oishee

== P ==
- Shabnam Parvin
- Keya Payel
- Jannatul Ferdous Peya
- Sadika Parvin Popy
- Rokeya Prachy
- Alisha Pradhan
- Sadia Jahan Prova
- Dilara Hanif Purnima

== R ==
- Mridula Ahmed Racy
- Abdur Rahman
- Ataur Rahman
- Khan Ataur Rahman
- Mashiat Rahman
- Minar Rahman
- Taskeen Rahman
- Ali Raj
- Wasimul Bari Rajib
- Mahbuba Islam Rakhi
- Sohel Rana
- Mamunur Rashid
- Abdur Razzak
- Amaan Reza
- Masum Reza
- Shampa Reza
- Riaz
- Farzana Rikta
- Yash Rohan
- Ronjita
- Ziaul Roshan
- Rozina
- Ahmed Rubel
- Masum Parvez Rubel
- Nijhum Rubina
- Dilruba Yasmeen Ruhee

== S ==
- Sohana Saba
- Mir Sabbir
- Mishu Sabbir
- Sarika Sabrin
- Shahidul Alam Sachchu
- Symon Sadik
- Arun Saha
- Sahara
- Tele Samad
- Omar Sani
- Rani Sarker
- Kabori Sarwar
- Misha Sawdagor
- Shahiduzzaman Selim
- Chandan Sen
- Shobha Sen
- Shabana
- Shabnam
- Shahnaz
- Shabnur
- Dino Shafeek
- Shahnoor
- Salman Shah
- ATM Shamsuzzaman
- Shanarei Devi Shanu
- Meher Afroz Shaon
- Afzal Sharif
- Ahmed Sharif
- Anjuman Ara Shilpi
- Shimla
- Rikita Nandini Shimu
- Sumaiya Shimu
- Suborna Shirin
- Anika Kabir Shokh
- Shuchanda
- Shuchorita
- Arifin Shuvoo
- Danny Sidak
- Kusum Sikder
- Richi Solaiman
- SM Solaiman
- Orchita Sporshia
- Sucharita
- Sujata
- Airin Sultana
- Anjana Sultana
- Zinat Sanu Swagata

== T ==
- Ratan Talukder
- Srabosti Dutta Tinni
- Nusrat Imrose Tisha
- Tanjin Tisha
- Tasnuva Tisha
- Tanjim Saiyara Totini
- Nazifa Tushi
- Tanin Subha

== U ==
- Uzzal

== W ==
- Shatabdi Wadud
- Wasim

== Y ==
- Shimul Yousuf

== Z ==
- Mohammad Zakaria
- Aly Zaker
- Iresh Zaker
- Sara Zaker
- Baby Zaman
- Dilara Zaman
- Sultana Zaman
- Titas Zia
