= MGH =

MGH may refer to:

== Hospitals ==
- Mandalay General Hospital, Myanmar
- Massachusetts General Hospital, Boston, U.S.
- Michael Garron Hospital, Toronto, Canada
- Montreal General Hospital, Canada

== Science ==
- mgh, equation for gravitational potential energy (mass × gravity × height)
- MgH, formula for the molecular gas magnesium monohydride
- MgH_{2}, formula for the chemical compound magnesium hydride

== Transportation ==
- Charles/MGH station, near Massachusetts General Hospital in Boston, U.S.
- MGH, the IATA code for Margate Airport, South Africa
- MGH, a vehicle registration code for Bad Mergentheim, Germany

== Other uses ==
- MGH, abbreviation for microglandular hyperplasia, a cervical lesion
- MGH, common abbreviation for Monumenta Germaniae Historica, a series of primary sources pertaining to German and European history
- MGH Group, a Singapore-headquartered Bangladeshi multinational conglomerate

== See also ==
- MGHS (disambiguation)
- NGH (disambiguation)
