= Samia Said =

Bangladeshi model and actress

Lux Channel I Superstar Samia Said
- সামিয়া সাঈদ
- Born: South Shields, England
- Education: North South University
- Years active: 2012-present
- Known for: Lux Channel I Superstar (2012)
- Children: 1

Samia Said Chowdhory (known as Samia Said or Samia Sayeed) is a Bangladeshi model and actress. She was the winner of Lux Channel I Superstar, the most prestigious beauty pageant in Bangladesh, was held in 2012. She started her acting career with the television drama Increment in 2012. Said rose to prominence with her film debut in the 2018 Beglali drama Komola Rocket directed by Noor Imran Mithu, which is an adaptation of two short stories Moulik and Saipras by Bengali writer Shahaduz Zaman.

== Early life and career ==
Samia Said was born in South Shields, England. She completed O Level from St Francis Xavier's Green Herald International School, and then A Level from Oxford International School in Dhaka. She studied English at North South University.

The first ever music video Samia appeared in was called Anmona by Imran and Naumi.

In 2016, Said appeared in the music video for Khan Asifur Rahman Agun' single "Ekbaro Ki Bhebechho" from the album Tin Tara.

In 2018, she was selected to audition for the female lead in Noor Imran Mithu's film Komola Rocket by its director. Said won the role of a young lady Dishi, the interest of the main character Atik, played by Tauquir Ahmed.

== Personal life ==
Said married to Abu Safat Chowdhury on 18 April 2018.

== Filmography ==
Year	Film	Role	Notes
2018	Komola Rocket	Dishi, young lady	Debut

== Television ==
Year	Title	Role	Notes
2012	Increment		
	Dhanyee Meye		
	Trade Fair		
	Hoyto Tomari Jonno		
2012	Palatak Shomoy		
2014	Ke Bhashabe Shada Megher Bhela		
2016	Bakshobondi		

=== Music video appearances ===
Year	Song	Performer(s)	Album
	Anmona	Imran and Naumi	
2016	"Ekbaro Ki Bhebechho"	Khan Asifur Rahman Agun	Tin Tara

Awards and achievements
Preceded by Mahbuba Islam Rakhi	Lux Channel I Superstar; 2012	Succeeded by Nadia Afrin Mim
