= Matiur Rahman (Bir Sreshtho) =

Bangladeshi Freedom Fighter

Matiur Rahman Bir Sreshtho
- মতিউর রহমান
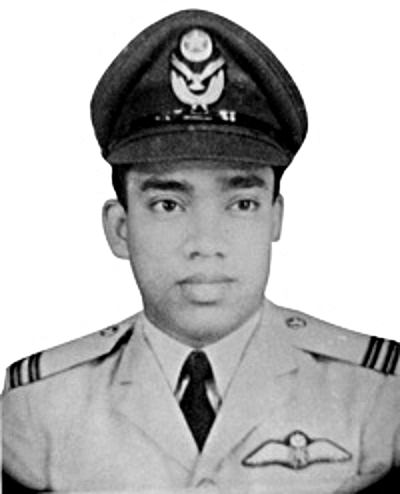
- Born: 29 October 1941; Ramnagar, Raipura, Narsingdi, Bengal, British India
- Died: 20 August 1971 (aged 29); Thatta, Sindh, Pakistan
- Burial place: Buddhijibi Graveyard
- Alma mater: Dhaka Collegiate School
- Spouse: Milly Rahman
- Military career
- Allegiance: Pakistan (until March 1971); Bangladesh (from March 1971)
- Branch: Pakistan Air Force (1963 – March 1971); Bangladesh Air Force (March 1971 – 20 August 1971)
- Service years: 1963–1971
- Rank: Flight Lieutenant
- Service number: PAK-4367
- Unit: No. 2 Squadron
- Conflicts: Indo-Pakistani War of 1965; Bangladesh War of Independence †
- Awards: Bir Sreshtho

Flight Lieutenant Matiur Rahman, Bir Sreshtho (29 October 1941 – 20 August 1971) was a Bengali fighter pilot in the Pakistan Air Force (PAF) from East Pakistan (now Bangladesh) and a recipient of Bir Sreshtho, Bangladesh's highest military award, for his actions during the Bangladesh War of Independence.

He attempted to escape from West Pakistan and join the Bangladesh War of Independence in then East Pakistan by hijacking a Lockheed T-33 aircraft being flown by a 20-year-old newly commissioned pilot officer, Rashid Minhas, who was conducting his second solo flight. Rahman stopped the aircraft on the runway, climbed into the cockpit, and steered the aircraft toward the Indian border, but Minhas soon realized his intentions and fought against him through the mechanically linked controls. Minhas then released the canopy, and since he was not properly strapped in, Rahman was sucked out of the cockpit. Minhas then tried to recover the plane, but it crashed since it was flying too low, killing him as well. For his efforts, Minhas was given Pakistan's highest military award, the Nishan-e-Haider, becoming the first and only officer from the PAF and also the youngest member of the armed forces to receive the honour. For his support to the state of Bangladesh, Rahman was decorated by Bangladesh with the Bir Sreshtho award.

== Early life ==
Matiur Rahman was born on 29 October 1941 in the maternal house of Mubarak Laus. His original home is in Ramnagar village, Musapur Union of Raipura Upazila, Narsingdi.

Matiur Rahman completed his primary education at Dhaka Collegiate School. After that, he was admitted into Pakistan Air Force School Sargodha in West Pakistan. On 15 August 1961, he joined the Pakistan Air Force Academy (then Pakistan Air Force College) at Risalpur. On 22 June 1963, Matiur Rahman was commissioned as a pilot officer from the 36th GD(P) Course and was posted at No. 2 Squadron of Mauripur Air Base (now Masroor) at Karachi in West Pakistan. After that, he successfully completed the jet conversion training on T-33 jet trainers at that base. He successfully passed the course with a mark of 75.66% and was earmarked for fighter conversion training. Fighter conversion training took place in F-86 Sabre Jets; he passed with a mark of 81%. He was posted in Peshawar (in No. 19 Squadron) due to his result in the Fighter Conversion Course.

== During the Bangladesh Liberation War ==
Flight Lieutenant Matiur Rahman smuggled the family of Group Captain Taher Quddus on a Royal Saudi Arabian C-130 transport plane bound for Riyadh during the liberation war of Bangladesh. Matiur Rahman and his family went to Dhaka for a two-month vacation at the end of January 1971. He was staying in the village of Ramanagar in Raipur during the military operation of 25 March 1971 conducted by the Pakistan army in the name of Operation Searchlight. Despite being a member of the PAF, Rahman opened a training camp in Vairab and started training Bengali people who were willing to join the Mukti Bahini. He formed a small defense force with willing members and a few collected weapons. His camp was bombed by the PAF on 14 April 1971. But Rahman anticipated the attack beforehand and changed the place of his camp. Thus, his crew and he were saved from the bombing. Rahman returned to Dhaka on 23 April and then returned to Karachi on 9 May with his family.

== Death ==
Rahman was an instructor pilot at PAF Base Masroor in 1971. He was planning to defect to Bangladesh with a plane to join the Bangladesh War of Independence. On 20 August 1971, Pilot Officer Rashid Minhas was scheduled to fly with a Lockheed T-33 jet trainer. Rahman saw Minhas about to take off and asked to join him. He jumped into the instructor's seat. He attempted to hijack the T-33 in midair to defect to Bangladesh. Minhas sent a message to the control tower that he was hijacked, and wrestled with Rahman for control, which crashed the plane in Pakistani territory, causing the death of both pilots. The plane never crossed into Indian airspace and crashed near the border in Pakistan.

Yawar A. Mazhar, a writer for Pakistan Military Consortium, relayed in 2004 that he spoke to retired PAF Group Captain Cecil Chaudhry about Minhas and that he learned more details not generally known to the public. According to Mazhar, Chaudhry led the immediate task of investigating the wreckage and writing the accident report. Chaudhry told Mazhar that he found the jet had hit the ground nose first, instantly killing Minhas in the front seat. Rahman's body, however, was not in the jet, and the canopy was missing. Chaudhry searched the area and saw Rahman's body some distance behind the jet, with severe abrasions from hitting the sand at a low angle and a high speed. Chaudhry thought that Minhas probably jettisoned the canopy at low altitude, causing Rahman to be thrown from the cockpit because he was not strapped in. Chaudhry felt that the jet was too close to the ground at that time, too far out of control for Minhas to be able to prevent the crash. Minhas received the Nishan-e-Haider award, equivalent to the Bir Shrestho award in Pakistan for his actions in attempting to hijack the aircraft.

=== Grave transfer ===
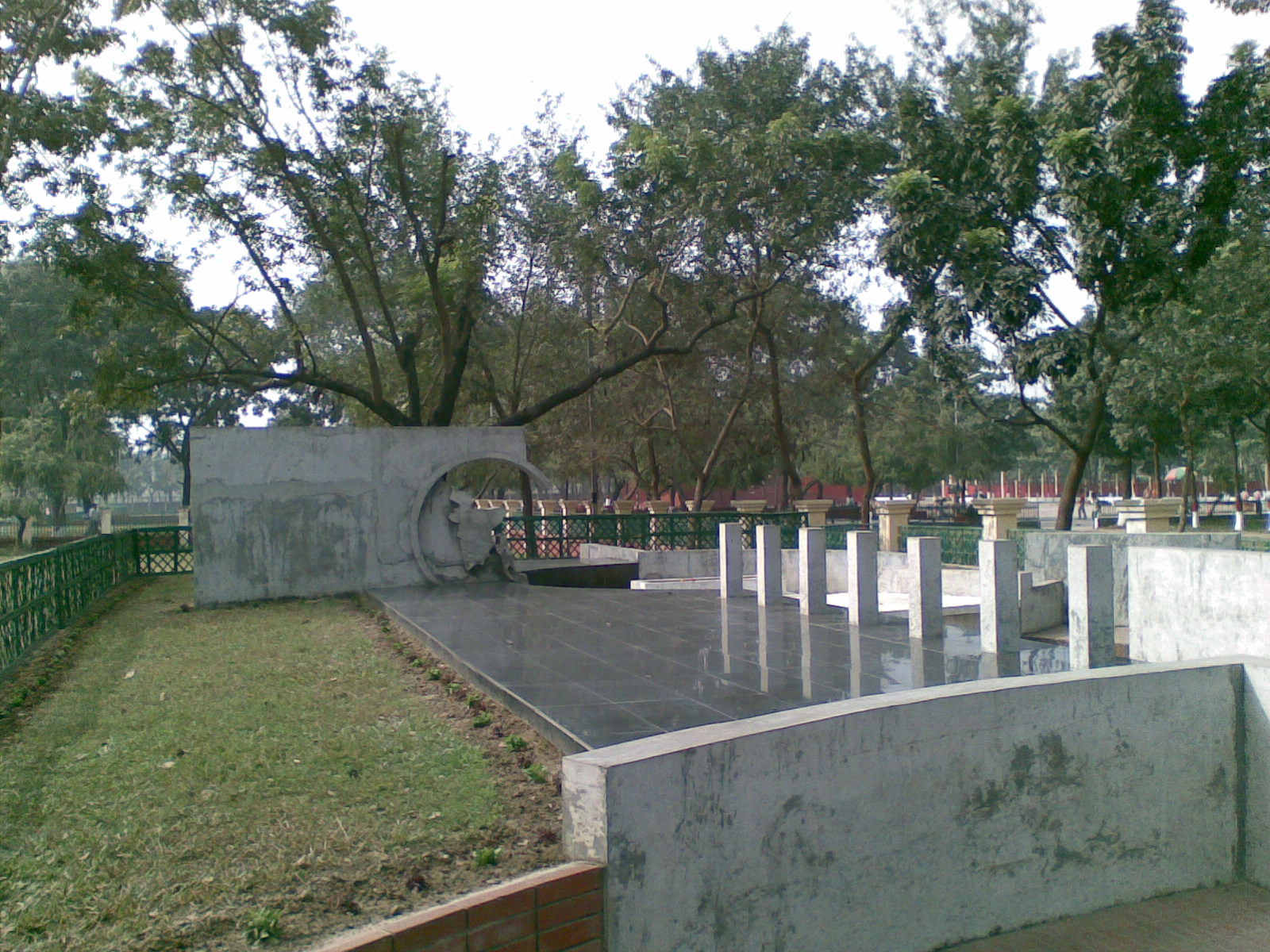
Rahman's grave in Dhaka

After over 30 years of negotiations, Rahman's body was finally returned to Bangladesh on 24 June 2006 for a ceremonial and highly symbolic reburial in 2006. Pakistani foreign ministry spokesperson Tasneem Aslam described it as a 'goodwill gesture'. He was buried at the Martyred Intellectuals Graveyard, in Mirpur, Dhaka, with full military honours. His original burial in a grave in a fourth-class employees' graveyard in Pakistan and the hanging of his photo at the entrance of Mashrur Airbase identifying him as a traitor had been a sore point between Bangladesh and Pakistan for decades.

== Eponyms ==
- Bangladesh Air Force Base Matiur Rahman at Jessore.
- Bangladesh Air Force also gives out a trophy for best performance in the flying training.
- Bir Shrestho Flight Lieutenant Matiur Rahman Cricket Stadium
- Bir Shrestho Flight Lieutenant Matiur Rahman Stadium
- Birshreshto Matiur Rahman trophy (a.k.a. Golden Pen award) awarded for the best individual research paper of Air Wing in Defence Services Command and Staff College.
- Dining halls in the cadet colleges of Bangladesh.

== Personal life and legacy ==
Rahman was married to Milly Rahman. Together they had two daughters, Mahin and Tuhin.

There is a docudrama based on Matiur's life named Ognibolaka with Bangladeshi film actor Riaz in the role of Matiur and television actress Tarin in the role of his wife, Mili. There is also a Bengali film named Ostittey Amar Desh (2007) based on Matiur's life, directed by "Khijir Hayat Khan". His wife, "Mili Rahman", was the co-writer of this film and also acted in it.
