= Peya =

Peya is a surname and given name. Notable people with the name include:

surname

- Alexander Peya (born 1980), Austrian tennis player
- Jannatul Ferdous Peya, Bangladeshi model, actress and lawyer

given name

- Peya Bipasha, Bangladeshi actress
- Peya Mushelenga (born 1975), Namibian politician
