= NGH =

NGH may refer to:

== Hospitals ==
- Nanjing General Hospital of People's Liberation Army, Jiangsu, China
- Newcastle General Hospital, England (1948–2010)
- North General Hospital, New York City (1979–2010)
- Northampton General Hospital, England
- Northern General Hospital, Sheffield, England

== Other uses ==
- ngh, the ISO 639-3 code for the Nǁng language of South Africa
- Nation's Giant Hamburgers, a fast food chain based in California, U.S.
- National Guild of Hypnotists, a non-profit organization based in New Hampshire, U.S.
- Natural gas hydrate, a solid similar to ice, formed by methane trapped within a crystal structure of water

== See also ==
- MGH (disambiguation)
- NGHS (disambiguation)
