= Mr. Bangladesh =

Mr. Bangladesh may refer to:

- Bangladesh (music producer)
- Mr. Bangladesh (film)
