= Mibi =

Mibi, MIBI, or variation, may refer to:

- methoxyisobutylisonitrile (MIBI), a chemical used in nuclear medicine
- Multiplexed ion beam imaging (MIBI), a type of mass spectrometry imaging
- Men in Black: International (2019 film) "Men in Black 4" a.k.a. MiB:I or MiBi

== See also ==
- Men in Black (1997 film) a.k.a. MIB1
- MIB1
