= Adil Hossain Noble =

Bangladeshi model and actor

- আদিল হোসাইন নোবেল
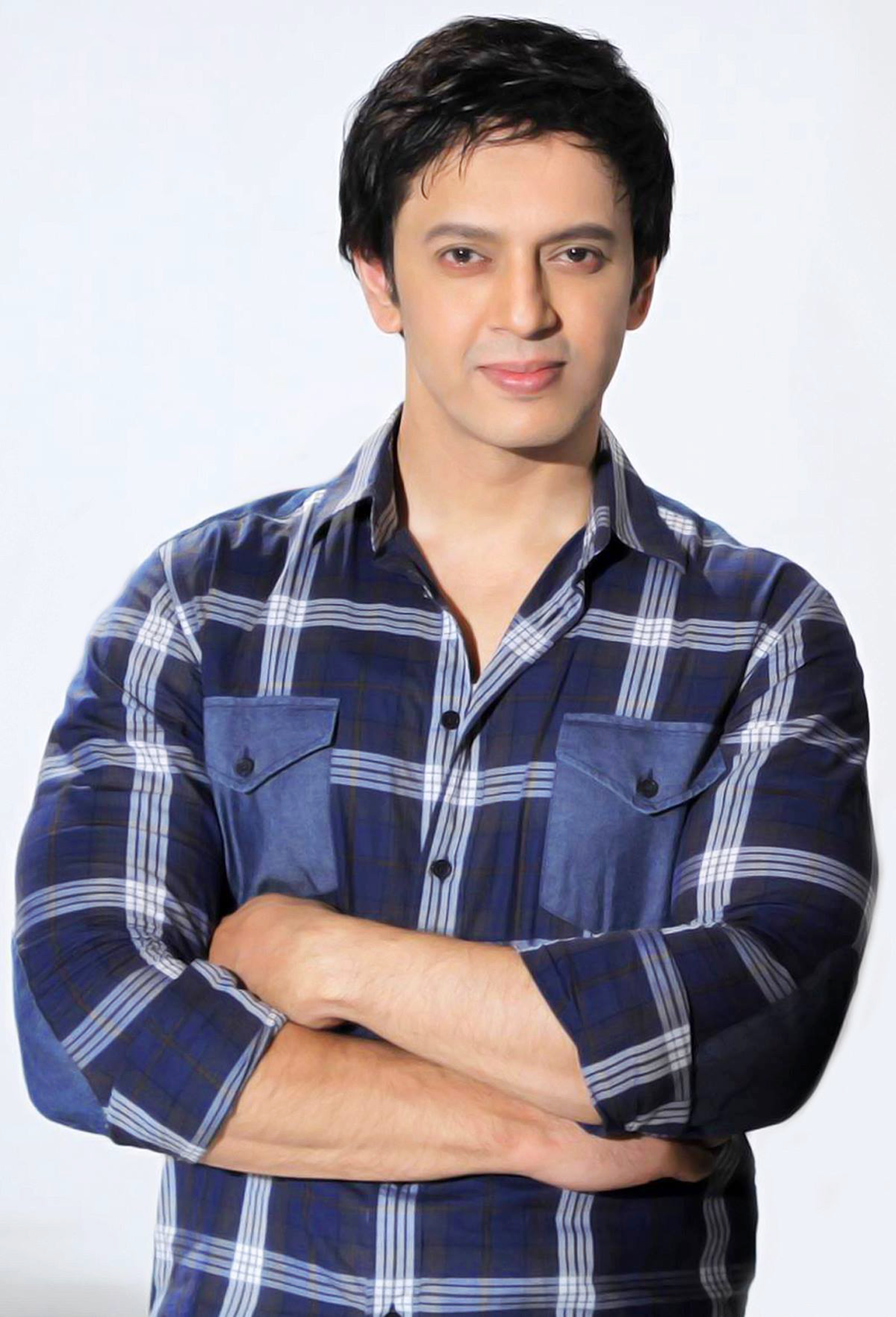
- Noble in 2013
- Born: December 20; Rangunia,Chittagong
- Occupations: Performer, model, television actor
- Years active: 1991–present
- Awards: Meril Prothom Alo Awards

Adil Hossain Noble (Bengali: আদিল হোসাইন নোবেল; born December 20; Rangunia,Chittagong) is a Bangladeshi actor and model. He has appeared in various television dramas and has served as a judge on the "Veet–Channel i Female Model Hunt" competition.

He served as the chief enterprise business officer of Robi Axiata. His notable acts include, "Kusum Kanta", "Choto Choto Dheu", "Tahara", "Prema Tomake", "Shesher Kobitar Porer Kobita", "Brishti Pore", "Nissonggo Radhachura", "Tumi Amake Boloni" and "House Husband, Sobuj Alpothe".

== Early life ==
Noble was born and raised in Chakaria, Chittagong. After graduation from Chittagong College in 1989, he moved to Dhaka. He completed his MBA from Victoria University. He has also undergone higher training in key accounts management from the Singapore Institute of Management, Indian Institute of Management, and Xavier Labour Relations Institute. Since he had done some modeling as a student, he was introduced to the modeling industry by Afzal Hossain. He first worked in an ad for Sprite. That ad was not aired due to technical reasons. Azad Ballpen's 'Lonely Day, Lonely Night' ad, directed by Afzal Hossain, is the first widely viewed advertisement for the Noble.

== Career ==
The pair of Noble and Mou became popular in TV modelling. Prachir Periye was his first TV drama.

Noble acted in some TV dramas apart from his modeling. His first drama was Prachir Periye, which was the first package TV drama in the country. The drama was telecast on BTV in 1995. He also played the character of Kazi Anwar Hossain's popular secret agent Masud Rana for television.

Professionally, Noble started his career in the shipping division of MGH Group in December 1993. In July 1996, he joined a manufacturing company, Coats Bangladesh Ltd. He was general manager of marketing services in COATS Bangladesh Ltd. In 2010, he joined Warid Telecom Limited (now Airtel Bangladesh) as head corporate and SME sales in the sales division. Adil was appointed as the chief enterprise business officer on June 1, 2019. He joined Robi in October 2014 as executive vice president, enterprise business.

Noble is one of the judges of the female model hunt contest Veet Channel I Top Model, and guest judge of Lux Channel i Superstar on Channel i.

In 2023, Adil Hossain Noble was appointed as the managing director and chief executive officer of Axentec PLC, further strengthening his position in the corporate sector alongside his work in the media and entertainment industry.

== Filmography ==
=== Drama ===
Year	Title	Role	Co-Artist	Director	Released	Notes
2019	Ahongkar		Anika Kabir Shokh	Sheikh Selim		
	Love Finally		Mou	Kawshik Sankar Das		
2017	Unpredictable		Tisha			Telefilm
	Shesher Kabita Porer Kabita					
	House Husband					
	Ochena Otithi					
	Tumi Nai Tumi Acho					
	Tahara					
	Sobuj Al Pothe Akdin					
	Kushum Kata					
	Tok Jhal Misti					
2019	Black November		Sumaiya Shimu			
	Chaya		Zakia Bari Momo	Tania Ahmed		
	Shukhtara					
	Somoy Jokhon Thomke Daray					

== Brand ambassador ==
- Brand ambassador of LUBNAN. Year: 2011, 2012, 2013
- Brand ambassador of Richman. Year: 2014, 2015, 2016
- Brand ambassador of Infinity Mega Mall. Year: 2017, 2018, 2019, 2020, 2021
- Brand ambassador of Reckkit Benckiser HARPIC Brand. Year: 2016- 2017

== Notable TVC ==
- Azad Ball Pen- 1992
- Pakiza Saree- 1994
- HRC Tea- 1993
- Keya beauty soap- 1996, 1998
- Keya Telkom Powder- 1998, 2000
- Keya Lemon Soap- 1999, 2000
- Keya Detergent soap- 1998
- Keya Hair Oil- 2001
- Keya Toothpaste- 2002
- Keya Petroleum Jelly- 2003
- Keya Lifeguard Soap- 2012
- Amin Jewelers- 2004
- RC Cola- 2000, 2003, 2008, 2013
- RC Lemon-2012
- Banglalink telecom - 2008
- Soybean Oil-2015
- HARPIC Toilet Cleaner- 2016
- Danish Cookies- 2014
- ROBI TVC - 2017
- Infinity Mega Mall- 2019
- Chef Sunflower Oil - 2019
- Gree AC- 2019, 2020, 2021
- Godrej Expert Hair Color- 2021

== As a judge ==
- Lux Channel I Super Star Award 2010
- Lux Channel I Super Star Award 2014
- Veet Channel I Top Model Hunt-2011, 2014, 2015

== Awards ==
Noble got six awards for modeling. He was awarded Meril Prothom Alo Awards for Best Male Model category in 2003.
