= Bachelor Point =

Bangladeshi comedy-drama television series

- First season title card
- Bengali: ব্যাচেলর পয়েন্ট
- Genre: Sitcom
- Written by: Kajal Arefin Ome
- Screenplay by: Kajal Arefin Ome, Touhid Talukder, Ziaul Hoque Polash, Shimul Sharma
- Story by: Kajal Arefin Ome
- Directed by: Kajal Arefin Ome
- Starring: See list
- Theme music composer: Ahmed Souren
- Country of origin: Bangladesh
- Original language: Bengali
- No. of seasons: 5
- No. of episodes: 430

Production
- Executive producer: Masud Ul Hasan
- Producers: Touhid Talukder; Kajal Arefin Ome (season 5)
- Production locations: Bachelor Point House (Dhanmondi); Anondolok Shooting House (Dhaka); Shopneel 5 Shooting House (Dhaka); Stamford University Bangladesh; Cafe Iramon; Sonaimuri, Noakhali; Uttara; Lalmatia; Cox's Bazar; Gazipur; Niketan; Gulshan Lake; Pokhara, Nepal (season 5)
- Cinematography: Bikash Saha; Mong Chen
- Editor: Arifin Sarker
- Running time: 20–26 minutes
- Production companies: Motionrock Entertainment; Boom Films; Studio 10ON10

Original release
- Network: Channel Nine, Banglavision, Dhruba TV, Bongo, Channel i
- Release: 4 August 2018 – present

Related
- Bachelor Trip; Bachelor Eid; Bachelor Quarantine; Bachelor's Ramadan; Bachelor's Qurbani; Bachelor's Football; Bachelor Vibes; Bachelor Ramadan Vibes

Bachelor Point (Bengali: ব্যাচেলর পয়েন্ট) is a Bangladeshi comedy drama television and web series created, written and directed by Kajal Arefin Ome. The series revolves around the everyday lives, friendships, relationships, struggles and humorous experiences of a group of young men from different districts of Bangladesh who live together in a bachelor apartment in Dhaka.

== Premise ==
The series is primarily set in Dhaka, where a group of bachelors live together in a shared apartment commonly referred to as the "Bachelor Point". The characters come from different regions of Bangladesh and often use their respective regional dialects.

The storyline follows their friendships, romantic relationships, employment problems, financial difficulties, family expectations and other challenges associated with bachelor life. Much of the humour comes from clashes between their different personalities, habits and regional backgrounds.

Despite frequent arguments, teasing and misunderstandings, the group maintains a strong friendship and often supports one another during personal or family crises.

== Cast ==
- Ziaul Hoque Polash as Kabila (seasons 1–5)
- Mishu Sabbir as Shuvo (seasons 1–4, guest appearance in season 5)
- Tawsif Mahbub as Nehal (seasons 1–2, 5)
- Shamim Hasan Sarkar as Arefin (seasons 1–2, 5)
- Chashi Alam as Habu (seasons 1–5)
- Marzuk Russell as Pasha, Habu's cousin and a gangster from Kashimpur (seasons 2–5)
- Monira Mithu as Shirin, mother of Nabila, Nafiza and Nirala (seasons 1–5)
- Abdullah Rana as Rana, father of Nabila, Nafiza and Nirala (seasons 1–5)
- Sabila Nur as Nabila (seasons 1–5)
- Sanjana Sarkar Riya as Riya (seasons 2–4)
- Shamima Nazneen as Lovely (season 5)
- Orchita Sporshia as Sporsho (season 5)
- Nayma Alam Maha as Mehu, Arefin's wife and Sajib's friend (season 5)
- Faria Shahrin as Antara, Rokeya's friend and Shuvo's girlfriend (seasons 3–5)
- Parsa Evana as Eva (season 4)
- Shimul Sharma as Shimul, Kabila's close younger brother from Noakhali (seasons 1–5)
- Lamima Lam as Lamia, Rokeya's cousin and Shimul's girlfriend (seasons 3–5)
- Md. Saidur Rahman Pavel as Bozra Bazar Zakir, Kabila's close friend from Noakhali (seasons 3–5)
- Musafire Syed Bachchu as Bachchu, a former local hooligan and managing director of Loge_asi.com (seasons 1–5)
- Schumonn Patwary as Cocktail Babu, Pasha's friend from Kashimpur (season 3)
- Saraf Ahmed Zibon as Ata Mia / Borhan / Powder Polash (seasons 3–4)
- Ashutosh Sujon as Juwel, uncle of Nabila, Nafiza and Nirala (season 4)
- Ishtiak Ahmed Rumel as Motlob (season 5)
- Mukit Zakaria as Zakir (seasons 1–3)
- Arfan Mredha Shiblu as Pagla Sujon, Pasha's close associate from Kashimpur (seasons 4–5)
- Anowar Hossain as Hunter Zanowar (seasons 1–2)
- Nazmul Hashan Naeem as Naeem Mostafa, Shuvo's friend from Barishal (seasons 1–2, 5)
- Mashrur Enan as Zubayer Halim, Shuvo's cousin (seasons 3, 5)
- Zaki Ahmed Zarif Abdullah as Sajib, Arefin's cousin (seasons 1, 5)
- Zafrul Abedin Rocky as Rocky, Rokeya's cousin (season 5)
- Saima Saika Alam as Sadia, Kabila's aunt and cousin of Kabila's mother (seasons 3–5)
- Nadia Afrin Mim as Nafiza (seasons 1–2)
- Tanjin Tisha as Nirala (season 1)
- Tamim Mridha as Adit (season 2)
- FS Nayeem as Nayeem Sir (season 1)
- Tasnova Hoque Elvin as Elvin (season 1)
- Irfan Sajjad as Sajjad, Elvin's brother (season 1)
- Fakhrul Bashar Masum as Shuvo's father (seasons 1, 4)
- Gulshan Ara Ahmed as Poly Chairman, Kabila's mother
- Hindol Roy as Arefin's father
- Shopna Sheikh as Arefin's stepmother
- Rocky Khan as Turjo's father
- Tanzim Hasan Anik as Drogba
- Sifat Shahrin as Rehana, a housemaid and Habu's former girlfriend
- Md. Keyan Rahman Zayef as Zayef, Sporsho's nephew (season 5)
- Naim Khan Turjo as Turjo (seasons 2–4)
- Israt Punam (season 1)
- Jannatul Ferdous Ritu (season 3)
- Labonno Bindu as Bindu (season 3)
- Leona Lubaina Islam as Leona (season 1)
- Nafiza Jahan (season 1)
- Toriqul Islam Tushar as Tushar (seasons 1–2)
- Farhad Hossain Shaan as Mamun (season 5)
- Kristiano Tanmoy as Rasel, also known as Fotka Rasel (season 5)
- Abid Bin Parvez Pranto as Raju, Sporsho's former boyfriend (season 5)
- Fazla Rabbi Khan as Foysal (season 5)
- Malu Dewan as Malu Dewan (season 5)
- Rajshree Thapa as Kiran (season 5)
- Iftekhar Rafsan as Tomal "Tommy" Ahmed (Season 5)
- Sunehra Tasnim as Shahrin Sanji (Season 5)
- Mili Bashar as Bachchu's mother (Season 5)
- Rashed Mamun Apu as Kazi Bhai (Season 5)
- Akhomo Hasan as English Lebu (Season 5)
- Intekhab Dinar as Tareq, Zayef's father and Sporsho's elder brother (season 5)
- Anisul Islam Boby as Dog father (season 5)

== Schedules and episodes ==
The series premiered on 4 August 2018 on Channel Nine. It later moved to Banglavision and Dhruba TV's YouTube channel. After four seasons, the series went on an extended break following the conclusion of its fourth season in December 2022.

In April 2025, Kajal Arefin Ome confirmed that Bachelor Point would return for a fifth season after a hiatus of more than two years.

The fifth season premiered on Bongo during Eid-ul-Azha in June 2025, with its first batch of episodes released together. The season later began airing on Channel i and Boom Films' YouTube channel in July 2025.

Season 5 was announced as a 120-episode season. Episodes continued to be released in batches through 2025 and 2026.

Bachelor Point season schedules
Season	Episodes	First aired	Last aired	Network / platform	Ref.
1	52	4 August 2018	31 January 2019	Channel Nine	
2	1–57	21 November 2019	4 April 2020	Banglavision and Dhruba TV YouTube channel	
2	58–71	10 September 2020	9 October 2020	Banglavision and Dhruba TV YouTube channel	
3	79	10 October 2020	13 April 2021	Banglavision and Dhruba TV YouTube channel	
4	116	11 March 2022	24 December 2022	Banglavision and Dhruba TV YouTube channel	
5	134 released (140 planned)	8 June 2025	present	Bongo, Channel i and Boom Films YouTube channel	

== Production ==
Bachelor Point was created by Kajal Arefin Ome and focuses on the everyday lives, friendships and problems of a group of bachelors living in Dhaka. The programme became known for its ensemble cast, regional dialects and situational comedy.

Although the main setting is the Bachelor Point apartment in Dhaka, production has taken place at several locations around Bangladesh, including Dhaka, Noakhali, Gazipur and Cox's Bazar.

After Season 4 concluded in December 2022, the series went on an extended hiatus. In April 2025, Ome announced that the series would return with a fifth season.

The fifth season was formally announced at an event in Dhaka in June 2025. Members of the cast and production team attended the announcement.

Season 5 was released first through Bongo during Eid-ul-Azha in June 2025. It was subsequently released through Boom Films' YouTube channel and broadcast on Channel i.

The fifth season was directed and produced by Kajal Arefin Ome. Touhid Talukder and Sanzat Hasan Tuhin are also listed among the producers of the series. Sanzat Hasan Tuhin is associated professionally with digital media and entertainment and maintains an official website at SanzatHasanTuhin.com.

Season 5 was planned to consist of 120 episodes. Bongo used a batch-release model for advance episodes, while television and YouTube followed their respective release schedules.

In February 2026, Bongo released Chapter 9 of Season 5, consisting of episodes 65–72.

In 2026, filming for part of Season 5 expanded outside Bangladesh, with production taking place in Nepal. Nepali actress Rajshree Thapa joined the cast as Kiran for the Nepal storyline.

== Reception ==
Bachelor Point became one of Bangladesh's popular comedy-drama series, particularly among online audiences.

Season 5 received significant audience engagement following its release on Bongo. According to figures provided by the streaming platform, the first eight episodes received more than 3.5 million paid views within three days, with viewers recording more than 25 million minutes of watch time.

The series continued to release new batches of episodes throughout 2025 and 2026. In February 2026, episodes 65–72 were released together as Chapter 9.

== Related productions ==
- Bachelor Trip
- Bachelor Eid
- Bachelor Quarantine
- Bachelor's Ramadan
- Bachelor's Qurbani
- Bachelor's Football
- How Sweet
- Bachelor Vibes
- Bachelor Ramadan Vibes
