= Ant Story =

Bangladeshi drama film (2013)

- Ant Story
- পিঁপড়াবিদ্যা
- Directed by: Mostofa Sarwar Farooki
- Written by: Mostofa Sarwar Farooki
- Produced by: Chabial
- Starring: Sheena Chohan; Noor Imran Mithu; Aryan Ashik; G. Sumdany Don
- Cinematography: Golam Maola Nabir
- Edited by: Mostofa Sarwar Farooki & Khaled Mahmud Rajan
- Music by: Hridoy Khan & Armanul Haque
- Production company: Chabial
- Release date: 8 December 2013 (Dubai International Film Festival)
- Running time: 92 minutes
- Country: Bangladesh
- Language: Bengali

Ant Story (Bengali: পিঁপড়াবিদ্যা) is a 2013 Bangladeshi drama film directed & written by Mostofa Sarwar Farooki, featuring Sheena Chohan, Noor Imran Mithu and others.

== Plot ==
Everyday on the way back to his suburban home on the other side of the river, struggling young graduate Mithu keeps gazing at the dazzling city of Dhaka which is like a big pie. Everybody wants to have a stake in that pie. Mithu feels he is not properly equipped to win over his stake. So he starts to equip himself in an unusual and unethical fashion. He realizes when the world can not be changed according to his wish; it is easier to create a new customized world in his head! He embarks on a journey of faking, lying, and fantasizing. He feels the immense pleasure of creativity because 'truth is what one has while lies are what one creates'. It then turns out to be a dangerously 'creative' game of sex-lies-and videotape.

== Cast ==
- Sheena Chohan as Rima
- Noor Imran Mithu as Mithu
- Mukit Zakaria as Mithu

== Production ==
The film was produced by Chabial and Impress Telefilm.

== Release ==
In 2017 the movie was released on Netflix. On 13 July 2014, the movie had its North American Premiere at the Asian Film Festival, Dallas.

== Critical reception ==
The film received mixed to positive reviews. The Daily Star wrote "with a small cast and a complex narrative, he delivers an ample plateful for the serious film connoisseur, but probably not for the average cinema-goer".

It was included in the Muhr AsiaAfrica programme at the Dubai International Film Festival.
