= Peya Bipasha =

Bangladeshi actress (born 1994)

- পিয়া বিপাশা
- Born: Azmeri Sultana Bipasha; 19 July 1994 (age 32); Dhaka, Bangladesh
- Occupation: Actress
- Years active: 2012–present
- Title: Mrs. Bangladesh World 2022
- Beauty pageant titleholder
- Major competitions: Lux Channel I Superstar 2012 (Top 10); Mrs. World 2022(Unplaced)

Azmeri Sultana Bipasha, widely known as Peya Bipasha, is a Bangladeshi actress and beauty pageant titleholder who won Mrs. World Bangladesh 2022. She represented Bangladesh at Mrs. World 2022 and participated in the Lux Channel I Superstar beauty contest in 2012. Bipasha is also known as an actor, appearing in many TV dramas such as Trade Fair, Somoyer Golpo Osomoyer Sopno and Osamapto Vhalobasha.

== Career ==
Bipasha began as a billboard model appearing for Vaseline by Unilever. It was placed at 5500 different locations around the country. Bipasha's first work as a model was with Aarong. Later she worked with other Bangladeshi brands including, Ecstasy, and Cats Eye. She was a brand ambassador of Unilever for a year.

Bipasha began working in TV commercials. Her first was for Polar Ice Cream, and she later appeared in commercials for Grameen Phone, Ispahani Cha, Parachute Narikel Tel, Frooto Mango Juice, Olympic T20 biscuits, and Fresh Soyabean Tel.

Bipasha made her acting debut in the TV drama 'Ditiyo Matra' with Tahsan Rahman Khan. Then she appeared in the dramas 'Trade Fair', 'Somoyer Golpo Osomoyer Sopno' and 'Osamapto Vhalobasha'.

== Personal life ==
Peya Bipasha was previously married and later divorced; she has a daughter named Peya Soha from that marriage. On 20 June 2025, she remarried in the United States, a moment she shared through her official Instagram account.

== Television ==
Year	Drama	Co-artist	Role	Director	Notes
2013	Ditiyo Matra	Tahsan Rahman Khan		Masudul Hasan	Acting debut
2014	Oshomapto Valobasha	Ripon		---	
2015	Bihobol Dishehara	Ziaul Faruq Apurba	Ruponty		
2015	Durotto Bojay Rakhun	Afran Nisho		Milon Bhattacharya	
2016	Biprotip	Afran Nisho		Saiful Alam Shamim	
2016	Bhalobasha Dujonay	Mamnun Hasan Emon	---	Sheikh Selim	
2016	Shirt	Ahmed Rubel	---	Anjan Aich	
2016	Putul Putul	Afzal Hossain	Samara	Topu	
2016	Shomoyer Shopno Osomoyer Golpo	Ziaul Faruq Apurba		---	
2016	Bhalobeshe Jodi Sukh Nahi	Mamnun Hasan Emon	---	---	
2016	Premika	Riaz	---	Piklu Chowdhury	
2016	Hip Hip Hurree (episode 7)	Mamnun Hasan Emon	---	---	
2016	Vanumotir Khela	Nayeem	---	---	
2017	Shomoy Oshomoy Bhalobashi Sobsomoy	Mishu, Zaker		---	
2017	Bicycle Prem	Tawsif Mahbub		Biswajit Dutt	
2017	M Report	Ziaul Faruq Apurba		Sheikh Selim	
2017	Suitecase	Mishu Sabbir	---	---	
2017	Prem O Ochena Shohor	Mamnun Hasan Emon	---	---	
2017	Lokshani Pola	DA Tayeb		Parthib Mamun	
2017	Ekti Paribarik Prem Kahini	Chanchal Chowdhury		Mohammad Mostafa Kamal Raj	
2017	Ghotonaguli Kalponik	Shajal Noor		Simanto Sajal	
2017	Pendulum	Afran Nisho		Mahbub Nil	
2017	Up & Down	Tawsif Mahbub		Shaikat Reza	
2017	Ayna	Farhan Ahmed Jovan	Nira	Arif A. Ahnaf	
2018	Sukh Pakhi	Afran Nisho		Sanjoy Somaddar	
2018	Basic Ali (season 3)	Tawsif Mahubub	Riya	Goutam Koiri	
2018	Apartment 2B	Manoj Kumar			
2018	Please Be Mine	Jon Kabir	Sneha	Mabrur Rashid Bannah	
2018	Ami Bibaho Koribo Na	Jahid Hasan			
2018	Neel Megher Chobi	Shajal Noor			
2018	Valo Thakuk Bhalobasha	Afran Nisho	Ananya	Sanjoy Somaddar	
2018	Argentina vs. Brazil	Afran Nisho		Mabrur Rashid Bannah	
2018	Helpful Saiful	Afran Nisho		Mohidul Mohim	
2018	Anmone Tumi	Ziaul Faruq Apurba		Sanjoy Somaddar	
2018	Rodro Chayar Songshar	Mamnun Hasan Emon			
2018	Kach Shomundro	Mamnun Hasan Emon		Shafiqur Shantanu	
2018	Sat Shomuddur Dure	Shajal Noor			
2018	Golpota Sudhu Tomar Amar	Mamnun Hasan Emon		Shariful Islam Shamim	
2019	Ami Tumi Ebong Bhalobasha	Irfan Sazzad	Ellie	Juel Hasan	
2019	Gerakol	Farhan Ahmed Jovan			
2019	Shunno Hridoy	Mamnun Hasan Emon			
2019	Srinkhol	Mamnun Hasan Emon			
2019	Diary of Love	Mamnun Hasan Emon		Shariful Islam Bijoy	
2019	Dhushor Prem	Mamnun Hasan Emon			
2019	Obhishopto Camera	Mamnun Hasan Emon			
2019	Baazpathor	Mamnun Hasan Emon, Niloy Alamgir		Sayed Shakil	
2019	Mamun Mama	Jahid Hasan	Pori	Sekh Selim	
2019	Rear View Mirror	Farhan Ahmed Jovan	Nodi	Aarif A. Ahnaf	
2019	To Be Wife	Ziaul Faruq Apurba	Tasnim	Imraul Rafat	
2019	Mr. Helanman	Jahid Hasan		Adibashi Mizan	
2019	Chinese Prem Kumar	Mamnun Hasan Emon		Anjan Aich	
2019	Special Marriage Act	Manoj Kumar		Amzad Mahmud	

.

== Short films ==
Year	Work	Co-artist	Role	Aired Channel	Director	Notes
2016	Anniversary	Manoj Pramanik	Asha	Pran Frooto	Atiq Zaman	Short Film
2016	Katush Kutush	Manoj Pramanik	Shormi	(Not Aired Yet)	Shubhasish Rai	Short Film
2017	Jhorer Pore	Siam Ahmed	Zerin	CD Choice	Sanjay Somaddar	Short Film
2017	Diary	Iresh Zaker		Pran Frooto	Mostafa Kamal Raz	Short Film
2018	El Classico Love	Evan Sair		Unlimited Audio Video	Sanjay Somaddar	Short Film

== TV commercials ==
- Grameenphone
- Ispahani Tea
- Parachute Coconut Oil
- Frooto Mango Juice
- Olympic T20 Biscuit
- Fresh Soyabean Oil
- Detos Chips
- Infinity Mega Mall
- Topper Cookware
- Click Iron
- Pran Lacchi
