= Ziaul Hoque Polash =

Bangladeshi actor

- জিয়াউল হক পলাশ
- Born: February 3, 1993 (age 33); Noakhali District, Bangladesh
- Other name: Kabila
- Education: Government Laboratory School; Government Titumir College
- Occupations: Actor director
- Years active: 2014–present
- Notable work: Bachelor Point; Family Crisis

YouTube information
- Channel: Ziaul Hoque Polash
- Years active: 31 October 2019–present
- Subscribers: 434 thousand
- Views: 14 million
- Last updated: 7 June 2025

Ziaul Hoque Polash (born 3 February 1993) is a Bangladeshi actor and director. He is best known for playing Kabila in the television drama series Bachelor Point and Parvez in the drama Family Crisis.

== Early life and education ==
Polash was born in Kalikapur village in Sonaimuri Upazila of Noakhali district. He spent his youth in Nakhalpara, Dhaka. In 2009, Polash sat the secondary school certificate exam at the Government Laboratory School and repeated it in 2010. Polash sat the higher secondary leaving certificate in 2013 and enrolled at the Government Titumir College where he completed an honours degree in finance and banking.

== Career ==
Polash's career began at college. He went on to perform in television drama series including Bachelor Point where he played Kabila. He also acted in dramas such as Ex-Boyfriend, Ex-Girlfriend, Bachelor Eid, Bachelor Trip, Me and You, Incomplete, and Muthophone.

Polash is also a television assistant director and theatre producer. His mentor was Mostofa Sarwar Farooki. He has produced the plays Friend with Benefits and Surprise. He trained under Mostofa Sarwar Farooki for about two years.

== Personal life ==
Polash married Nafisa Rumman Mehnaz on 16 December 2022. he has a son named Ahan.

== Television ==
Year	Title	Notes
2017	A Story of Suspicion	
2017	Journey by Lunch	
2017	Karsaji	
2018	Just Chill	
2018–present	Bachelor Point	
2019	Ex-Girlfriend	
2019	Network Busy	
2019	Bad Dreams	
2019	Plural Number Third Person	
2019	College Bunk	
2019	Not All Relationships Have Names	
2019	Tom and Jerry	
2019	Sorry Sir	
2019	Another Story of Suspicion	
2019	Another Cat Birambana	
2019	Tom and Jerry 2	
2019	Bachelor Trip	
2019	Bachelor Eid	
2019	Family Crisis	
2019	Me and You	
2019	Bhai Aasti Kavita Bhalobashe	
2019	Mobile Thief	
2019	Boka Bhalobashe	
2019	Mission Barishal	
2019	Under Save	
2019	Only Me	
2020	Propose	
2020	Stadium	
2020	Ghore Fera	
2020	Waiting	
2020	Takata Kai?	
2020	Bachelor Quarantine	
2020	Mask	
2020	Single	
2020	Kababer Haddi	
2020	Sunglass	
2021	Hello Baby	
2021	Female	
2021	ICU	
2021	Ektukhani	
2021	Cold	
2021	Youtumor	
2021	Apnon	
2021	Thanda	
2021	The Secret	
2022	Yogi	
2022	Sada Private	
2022	Bachelor Ramzan	
2022	Female 2	
2022	Bachelor Qorbani	
2022	Bad Buzz	
2022	Good Buzz	
2022	Dekha Dekhi	
2023	Bidesh	
2023	Kidney	
2023	Female 3	
2024	Vanishing Man	
2024	Female 4	
2024	Evabeo Fire Asha Jay	
2024	Udbeg	
2024	Sheshmesh	
2024	Dukkhito	
2025	Hosen Er Golpo	
2025	Pera	
2025	TAKA	
2025	Plural No 3rd Person	
2026	Mr Badal	
2026	Aira	
2026	Shondeho	
2026	Vanishing Man Returns	
2026	Comment Sense	
2026	Uposhongshar	
2026	Lighter	

== Director ==
Year	Title
2018	Friends with Benefits
2019	Surprise
2020	Ghar Fera
2021	A Little
2021	Revenge
2022	Female 2
2022	Bad-Badge
2022	The Kidnapper
2024	7 PM

== Web series ==
Year	Title
2021	Boli
2022	Teerondaj
2023	Hotel Relax
2024	Osomoy
2026	Love Sitter
