= Ora 7 Jon =

- First Poster
- Directed by: Khijir Hayat Khan
- Written by: Khijir Hayat Khan
- Produced by: Khijir Hayat Khan Bashir Ahmed Humanyun Kabir Mohammad Jahangir Alam
- Starring: Intekhab Dinar Zakir Bari Momo Khijir Hayat Khan
- Cinematography: Mohammad Arifuzzaman
- Edited by: Salahuddin Ahmed babu
- Music by: Nazmul abedin Rajib Hossain
- Production company: KHK Productions
- Distributed by: Western Engineering Pvt.Ltd Presents
- Release date: March 3, 2023
- Country: Bangladesh
- Language: Bengali
- Budget: ৳2.5 Crore

Ora 7 Jon (Bengali: ওরা ৭ জন) (English: They are Seven people) also known as The 7 is a 2023 Bangladeshi action-war film based on the 1971 Bangladesh Liberation War between Pakistan (The then West Pakistan) and Bangladesh (The then East Pakistan). The film is directed and written by Khijir Hayat Khan. The film was officially released on March 3, 2023.

== Plot ==
The story follows 7 brave freedom fighters heroism journey during the 1971 Liberation war, as they are on a mission to rescue a Bangladeshi doctor in the battleground of Victory.

== Cast ==
- Khijir Hayat Khan as Major Luthfur
- Zakia Bari Momo as Aporna
- Nazia Haque Orsha as Aporazita
- Shahriar Ferdous Sazeed as Sergent Muktadir
- Hamidur Rahman as Major Shahriar
- Imtiaz Barshon as Solaiman Kazi
- Khalid Manhub Turjo as Nazrul
- Joy raj as Awal Chaiman
- Amjad hossain as Amjad
- Intekhab Dinar as Doctor saab
- Nafis Ahmed
- Shiba Shamu
- Azam Khan

== Production ==
=== Development ===
In March 2021 while Khijir Hayat khan was found positive in COVID-19. He had an idea of making a new adaptation on the 1971 Bangladeshi Liberation war, as soon as he recovered, he started to work on the film. Khijir Hayat did both directing, writing and screenplay for the film. He wrote the story based on the experience he gathered from his maternal uncle who fought for Mukti Bahini during the Bangladesh Liberation War.

=== Filming ===
The film started filming on September 27, 2021, at Jayantapur, Sylhet. The Whole film was done in Sylhet. Not Only did KHK Productions team worked on the project but director Khijir Hayat also used the village peoples and hired them to do mirror role, making him to help the film more quickly and better. All Costumes of the film were designed by Eimon Khandakar and Makeup were done by Ratan Sarkar

== Music ==
The Songs and music for Ora 7 Jon were done by Nazmul Abedin and Rajib Hossain.

Songs
No.	Title	Singer(s)	Length
1	Mon Noukate	Rajib Hossain	4:35
2	Jao Dilam Jete	Nazmul Abedin	5:09

== Release ==
The film had an official theaters release at March 3, 2023 in 26 Cinema halls over the whole country

== Reception ==
=== Critical response ===
Bangla Movie database reviewed the movie and admired Ora 7 Jon as a "surprisingly good" film.

== Awards ==
Year	Award	Category	Winner	Result	Ref.
2026	Bangladesh National Film Awards 2023	Best Supporting Actress	Nazia Haque Orsha	Won	
