= Radio Foorti =

Bangladeshi radio station

- Dhaka, Bangladesh; Bangladesh
- Broadcast area: Bangladesh (FM)
- Frequency: 88.0 MHz

Programming
- Language: Bengali
- Format: Music radio

Ownership
- Owner: MGH Group

History
- First air date: 22 September 2006

Technical information
- Transmitter coordinates: 23.7951°N 90.4137°E

Links
- Webcast: Foorti App iOS, Play Store
- Website: www.radiofoorti.fm

Radio Foorti is first Bangladeshi FM radio station. The station went live on 22 September 2006, and is currently available in Dhaka, Chittagong, Sylhet. Rajshahi, Khulna, Barisal, Mymensingh, Cox's Bazar, Bogra, Noakhali and Kushtia. It has popularized the role of radio jockey in Bangladesh.

== Info ==
Radio Foorti hit the airwaves on 21 September 2006, in Dhaka at a frequency of 98.4 MHz. It later changed the frequency to 88.0 MHz by September 2007. It went on air in Chittagong in July 2007 at 98.4 MHz and in Sylhet on 1 February 2008, at 89.8 MHz. At present Radio Foorti is transmitting at 88.0 MHz all over Bangladesh. Now Radio Foorti is broadcasting across ten cities and their adjoining areas. Radio Foorti has separate stations in Dhaka, Chittagong, Sylhet. Rajshahi, Khulna, Barihal, Mymensingh, Cox's Bazar, Bogra and Noakhali.

Radio Foorti celebrated one decade in the industry on 27 September 2016.

Radio Foorti is also available for worldwide listeners through the Radio Foorti App.
