= Microglandular hyperplasia =

Microglandular hyperplasia (MGH) of the cervix is an epithelial (endocervical mucosa) benign abnormality (lesion) associated with gland proliferation. It can terminate in mature squamous metaplasia, and it is suspected reserve cells are involved in this process, perhaps in the form of reserve cell hyperplasia with glandular differentiation.

== Diagnosis ==
MGH shows certain cytomorphologic features from pap smears, such as bi- or tridimensional cellular clusters consisting of glandular cells with vacuolated cytoplasm together with reserve cells with scant cytoplasm. These features however are not characteristic exclusively to MGH, often being present in adenocarcinoma-affected tissue as well, and these tissues can be found merged with MGH areas. This results in difficulty distinguishing between endocervical lesions, and as such should not be used for diagnostic purposes.

The presence of subnuclear vacuoles is often observed in MGH, whereas squamous metaplasia, stromal foam cells, mitotic activity, vimentin and MIB‐1 expression are rather more often observed in adenocarcinoma.

== Incidence ==
MGH is often observed idiopathically in pregnant women, as well as women exposed to diethylstilbestrol both as a contraceptive or in-utero, however this association is not statistically significant. It has been suggested that HPV infection is an initial step towards the carcinogenesis in these lesions.

== See also ==
- Vaginal adenosis
