= Lux Channel I Superstar =

- Also known as: LUX Super Star
- Genre: Reality show Talent show
- No. of seasons: 10

Production
- Production location: Bangladesh China Friendship Conference Center
- Production company: Unilever Bangladesh Limited

Original release
- Network: Channel i
- Release: 2005 – 2025

Lux Channel i Superstar or Lux Super Star is a Bangladeshi leading talent hunt and television reality show that airs on Channel i. It is Bangladesh’s ultimate talent show for passionate young women ready to shine in the world of beauty & glamour. Aspiring actresses, singers, and models compete on the show for a chance to launch their careers. The champion gets the chance to be the "Face of Lux Bangladesh" and is awarded a brand new car, trophy, film contract and Tk. 10 lakh. The first runner-up award is Tk. 5 lakh while the second runner-up gets Tk. 3 lakh. The competition is held by a joint effort of Channel i and Unilever Bangladesh Limited. The competition was launched in 2005.

== Format ==
More than 10,000 girls around Bangladesh apply every year and the initial auditions are very competitive due to the large number of applicants. Once shortlisted, selected applicants are sent to live for 3 months in a "Boot camp" where various training programmes are held every day. Each season of Lux Channel i Superstar consists of 8-10 episodes and starts with 20 contestants. The contestants are judged weekly on their overall appearance, participation in challenges, and best shot from that week's photo shoot. Every week, single or multiple contestants are eliminated, though in some rare cases no elimination was given by the judging panel. Many big fashion brands are associated with the show as either costume or makeup partners.

== Host and judges ==
Year	Host	Judges	Guest Judges
2005			
2006		Tariq Anam Khan, Suborna Mustafa and Shamim Ara Nipa	
2007	Rumana Malik Munmun		
2008	Rumana Malik Munmun		
2009	Rumana Malik Munmun	Syed Shamsul Haque, Afsana Mimi and Suborna Mustafa	Asaduzzaman Noor, Shykh Seraj, Mahin Khan
2010	Rumana Malik Munmun	Tauquir Ahmed, Suborna Mustafa, and Afsana Mimi	Aly Zaker, and Adil Hossain Nobel
2012	Rumana Malik Munmun	Tauquir Ahmed, Afsana Mimi, and Jewel Aich	Asaduzzaman Noor and Shykh Seraj
2014	Rumana Malik Munmun	Suborna Mustafa, Aupee Karim, Tahsan Rahman Khan	Aly Zaker, Sara Zaker, Adil Hossain Nobel
2018	Masuma Rahman Nabila & Shoumik Ahmed	Arifin Shuvoo, Sadia Islam Mou, Tahsan Rahman Khan	Aly Zaker, Asaduzzaman Noor, Rumana Rashid Ishita
2025	Shoumik Ahmed	Mehazabien Chowdhury, Raihan Rafi, Jaya Ahsan	

== Contestants ==
Year	Winner	First Runner-up	Second Runner-up	Other contestants
1999	Aupee Karim			
2000	Mila Hossain			
2001	Shuvra Das	Syeda Tania Mahbub Tinni		
2002	Kusum Sikder	Farhana Deepti	Sonia Hossain Tina	Srabosti Dutta Tinni
2003	Shayla Shabnam	Rahnum Tasnuva Sonali	Saquiba Bintay Ali Pinky	
2004	Kazi Farhina Islam Limi	Tanzika Amin	Sumaya	
2005	Shanarei Devi Shanu	Antora Biswas Pinky	Navila Hasan	Sumana Afroz Suma
2006	Zakia Bari Momo	Afsana Ara Bindu	Azmeri Haque Badhon	Aparna Ghosh, Nafiza Jahan, Rumana Malik Munmun, Rishta Laboni Shimana
2007	Bidya Sinha Saha Mim	Sheikh Samroz Azmi Alvi	Farhana Shahrin Faria	Farah Diba, Ambrina Sarjeen Ambrin, Sumaiya Asgar Raha, Nafisa Ferdous, Upoma Bishwas, Morsheda Khan Urmi, Joya Roy.
2008	Ishrat Jahan Chaity	Syeda Ummey Tajzi	Rebecca Sultana Deepa	
2009	Mehazabien Chowdhury	Mounita Khan Ishana	Sadika Parvin Swarna Rumana	Nazia Haque Orsha, Sifat Tahsin
2010	Mahbuba Islam Rakhi	Moushumi Hamid	Mehrin Islam Nisha	Mashiat Rahman, Mumtaheena Chowdhury Toya, Tasnova Hoque Elvin
2012	Samia Said Chowdhory	Prosun Azad	Samiya Hossain Khan	
2014	Nadia Afrin Mim	Nazifa Tushi	Neelanjona Neela	
2018	Mim Mantasha	Sarwat Azad Brishti	Samia Othoi	Ishrat Zaheen Ahmed, Nabila Afrose
2025	Bidushi Bornita	Nazah Naoar	Amina Islam	Nusrat Afrin Yumna, Tista Paul

== See also ==
- Closeup1
- Shera Radhuni
- Notun Kuri
