= Komola Rocket =

2018 Bangladeshi Bengali drama film

- Theatrical release poster
- Bengali: কমলা রকেট
- Directed by: Noor Imran Mithu
- Screenplay by: Noor Imran Mithu
- Based on: Moulik and Saipras by Shahaduz Zaman
- Produced by: Faridur Reza Sagar
- Starring: Tauquir Ahmed; Mosharraf Karim; Joy Raj; Samia Said; Fariha Shams Sheuti
- Edited by: Rashaduzzman Shohag
- Music by: Imran Mahmudul; Aryan Ashik
- Distributed by: Impress Telefilm Limited, Netflix
- Release date: 16 June 2018 (Bangladesh)
- Running time: 1h 35min
- Country: Bangladesh
- Language: Bangla

Komola Rocket (Bengali: কমলা রকেট, The Orange Ship) is a 2018 Bangladeshi Bengali language drama film, written and directed by Noor Imran Mithu. The film based on two short stories Moulik and Saipras written by Shahaduz Zaman. The film was produced by Faridur Reza Sagar and Impress Telefilm Limited, and distributed by Impress Telefilm Limited. Starring Tauquir Ahmed, Mosharraf Karim, Joy Raj, Samia Said, Fariha Shams Sheuti and Dominic Gomes in the lead roles. It was presented on Netflix.

== Plot ==
The story is of an eventful steamer ride, which shows a canvasser Mofizul (Mosharraf Karim), and a garments factory owner Atik (Tauquir Ahmed), who is trying to disappear after burning down his factory to claim the money from insurance company. Another passenger Monsur, boards the steamer with the body of his wife, who died in that fire. The first class passengers don't mix with the other classes until the launch is stuck in shallow water for two nights, and shortage of food supply brings Atik down to Monsur's cabin.

== Cast ==
- Tauquir Ahmed as Atik, garments factory owner
- Mosharraf Karim as Mofizul, canvasser
- Joy Raj as Monsur, husband of the dead body
- Samia Said as Dishi, young lady, Ayesha's sister
- Fariha Shams Sheuti as Ayesha, Matin's wife and Dishi's sister
- Dominic Gomes as Matin, Ayesha's husband
- Abu Raihan Rasel as Job seekers
- Bappa Shantonu
- Shujat Shimul
- Shadullah Sobuj

== Soundtrack ==
Dahan

Soundtrack album by Imran Mahmudul and Aryan Ashik
- Released: 16 June 2018
- Recorded: 2018
- Genre: Feature film soundtrack
- Length: 14:00
- Language: Bangla
- Label: Impress Telefilm Limited

Komola Rocket soundtrack
No.	Title	Length
1.	"Monmajhe"	3:15
2.	"Mombati"	4:06
3.	"Komola Rocket"	3:05

== Release ==
The film is the third film from Bangladesh which saw its release on Netflix.

== Receptions ==
The film won Best Debut Film at the 4th Jaffna International Cinema Festival in Sri Lanka, Jury Prize at the Festival du Film d'Asie du Sud in France, and the Hiralal Sen Padak at the Amar Bhashar Cholochitra in Bangladesh. It also conquered by winning the Jury Awards at Nepal International Film Festival, and Sharm El-Sheikh Film Festival in Egypt.
