= Ostittey Amar Desh =

2007 Bangladeshi film

- Poster
- Directed by: Khijir Hayat Khan
- Written by: Milly Rahman; Khijir Hayat Khan
- Based on: The life and sacrifice of Flight Lieutenant Bir Shrestho Matiur Rahman
- Produced by: Milly Rahman; Khijir Hayat Khan
- Starring: Khijir Hayat Khan; Sharmin Zoha Shoshee; Milly Rahman; Muskan Hossain Ranta
- Cinematography: Saiful Islam Shahin
- Edited by: Md. Salauddin Ahmed Babu
- Music by: Anup Barua
- Production companies: Bir Shrestho Matiur Rahman Foundation; Sufia Films
- Release date: 26 March 2007
- Country: Bangladesh
- Language: Bengali

Ostittey Amar Desh (transl. My Country Exists) is a 2007 Bangladeshi Liberation War film directed by Khijir Hayat Khan. It is based on the life and sacrifice of Flight Lieutenant Bir Shrestho Matiur Rahman. Produced and written by Bir Shrestho Matiur Rahman's wife Milly Rahman and Khijir Hayat Khan under the banner of Bir Shrestho Matiur Rahman Foundation and Sufia Films. It is debut film of Khijir Hayat Khan as director and actor.

Saiful Islam Shahin is the cinematographer of the film and Rafiqul Islam Roni was the still photographer. The sound track score are composed by Anup Barua. Mansura Rahmatullah and Hedayetullah Khan the costume directors of the film and Md. Salauddin Ahmed Babu was the chief assistant director and editor of the film.

== Cast ==
- Khijir Hayat Khan as Shadhin / Flt LT Matiur Rahman
- Sharmin Zoha Shoshee as Moumita / Milly Rahman
- Bir Shrestho Matiur Rahman as Himself (archive footage)
- Milly Rahman as Herself
- Muskan Hossain Ranta as Mohin Matiur
- Mayabi as Tohin Matiur

== Release ==
The film Ostittey Amar Desh was released on March 26, 2007. The 120-minute film based on the Liberation War was directed by Khijir Hayat Khan and Milly Rahman.

== Response ==
The Bangladesh Post's survey the film has been added in general knowledge for government job viva. Wroted by the monthly magazine Rangberang's survey "The film is not very popular, it has been praised by the intellectuals community and has become a historical document".
