= Channel 9 (Bangladeshi TV channel) =

Channel 9 চ্যানেল নাইন
- Country: Bangladesh
- Broadcast area: Nationwide
- Headquarters: Panthapath, Dhaka

Programming
- Language: Bengali
- Picture format: 1080i HDTV (downscaled to 16:9 576i for SDTV sets)

Ownership
- Owner: Virgo Media Limited
- Key people: Syeda Mahbuba Akhter (chairman); Enayetur Rahman Bappy (managing director)

History
- Launched: 30 January 2012; 14 years ago

Links
- Website: www.channelninebd.tv

Channel 9 (Bengali: চ্যানেল নাইন) is a Bangladeshi Bengali-language satellite and cable television channel owned by Virgo Media Limited. Based in the Panthapath neighborhood of Dhaka, the channel began broadcasting on 30 January 2012. The channel airs sports and entertainment programming, and formerly aired news until the closure of its news division in 2019. It had the rights to broadcast the Bangladesh Premier League and La Liga.

== History ==
The Bangladesh Telecommunication Regulatory Commission granted Channel 9 a license to broadcast among other privately owned Bangladeshi television channels on 20 October 2009. It commenced test transmissions on 8 April 2011, and officially began broadcasting on 30 January 2012.

On 14 April 2012, the channel launched on Sky in the United Kingdom and Ireland, where it replaced NTV. The channel was broadcast free-to-air on Eutelsat 28A. This closed on 27 June 2014 and was replaced by Iqra Bangla, a sister channel to Iqra TV. It has been rumoured that Channel 9 will launch on Talk Talk Youview platform but no further information has been released.

On the occasion of the month of Ramadan, Channel 9 was one of the eight television channels to broadcast the cooking series Pran Premium Ghee Star Cook in July 2014. In September 2017, in observance of Eid al-Adha, the telefilm Boro Chele aired on Channel 9, which went viral on YouTube. On 21 May 2021, Channel 9, along with SA TV, was obliged to temporarily cease operations over unpaid satellite transponder fees, according to authorities. It was also announced that Channel 9 would resume transmissions by 23 May, which it did.

== Programming ==
=== List of programming ===
- Aşk Ağlatır (title localized as Akash Jure Megh)
- Bachelor Point
- Bohe Somantoral
- Dekha Dekhi
- Dhonni Meye
- Grandmaster
- Rabbu Bhai-er Bou
- Traveler's Story

== Key people ==
The chairwoman of Channel 9 is Syeda Mahbuba Akhter, the wife of retired Major General Syed Shafayetul Islam, son of Syed Nazrul Islam. While the managing director of the channel is Enayetur Rahman Bappy, who joined the channel after quitting NTV.

== See also ==
- List of television stations in Bangladesh
