= Shanarei Devi Shanu =

Bangladeshi actress & model

- শানারেই দেবী শানু
- Born: 22 February; Sylhet, Bangladesh
- Education: Master's (English)
- Alma mater: University of Dhaka; Murari Chand College
- Occupations: Actress; model; writer
- Years active: 2004–present
- Spouses: Xavier Shantanu Biswas (m. 2009, divorced) Mahbub Jamil (m. 2024)
- Parents: A. K. Sheram (father); Chandra Devi (mother)
- Awards: Jhilik-Channel i Eid Program Award (Best Supporting Actress, 2004)

Shanarei Devi Shanu is a Bangladeshi actress and model. She was the first crowned winner of the beauty pageant Lux-Channel i Superstar in 2005. After winning the beauty contest, she began acting in television dramas. Some of the notable television dramas she has acted in include Bairati, Palash Phuler Nolok, Kobi, Sakin Sarisuri, Ah Football Bah Football, Arman Bhai Birat Tension-e, Chorokabya, Aponghar, Kobiraj Golap Shah, and Kortakahini. In 2018, she made her film debut by acting in the movie Mister Bangladesh.

== Early life ==
Shanu was born into the Hindu Manipuri community of Sylhet. Her father is A. K. Sheram and her mother is Chandra Devi. From a very young age, she was involved in dance, music, recitation, debating, and acting. During her school and college years, she earned multiple awards, including gold medals at the national level in National Children's Week and National Education Week. She was among the top ten finalists in the Lux-Anandadhara Miss Photogenic contest and became a listed artist at the Sylhet center of Radio Bangladesh. In 2004, she acted in Bairati, a drama directed by Shakur Majid in the Sylheti regional dialect. For this work, she received the Jhilik-Channel i Eid Program Award in the Best Supporting Actress category. In 2005, she participated in the inaugural season of the Lux-Channel i Superstar competition and won the crown.

== Career ==
In 2005, Shanu acted in the television drama Ek Nijhum Aranya, directed by Rumana Rashid Ishita. Her husband, Xavier Shantanu Biswas, also acted in this drama. In 2013, under the direction of Aranyo Anwar, she portrayed the character Khushu in Kabiraj Golap Shah on Maasranga Television and acted in the RTV television series Oloshpur. She also appeared in Aranyo Anwar's Kortakahini and Buke Tar Chandoner Ghran, Debashish Barua Deep's Jyotiraj Tipu Sultan and Election Election, Apel Mahmud's Chhobir Haat, and in Faisal Rajib's Pordar Arale Ke and Rupali O Rupali Pordar Golpo television series. Additionally, she acted in Dui Bon, a one-episode television drama based on a novel by Rabindranath Tagore, directed by Shafik Babu.

In 2014, she acted in the SA TV drama series Come to the Point, directed by Manik Manobik, and in the Asian TV drama series Protipokkho, directed by Ashish Roy. She also appeared in GM Saikat's television drama Mohua.

Her first film was Mister Bangladesh (2018). Before that, she was supposed to act in Humayun Ahmed's film Noy Number Bipod Shongket. In Mister Bangladesh, directed by Abu Akhter Ul Iman and centered around the theme of militancy, she played the role of a housewife. Since 2018, she has been portraying the role of the elder queen in Channel i's mega serial Sat Bhai Champa.

== Literary career ==
Alongside acting, Shanu is also involved in writing. In 2017, her first book of poetry, Neel Foring Kobbo (The Blue Dragonfly Poems), was published at the Ekushey Book Fair by Anannya Publications. The collection contains 58 poems. The following year, three more poetry books of hers were published: Lal Epitaph (Red Epitaph) by Anannya Publications, Tribhuj (Triangle) by Tamralipi, and Oshomoyer Chirkut (The Letter of Untimely Hours) by Chaitanya.

In 2019, her novel Ekla Akash (Lonely Sky) was published by Tamralipi, and her children's storybook Shanarei and Her Magical Leitreng was published by Anannya Publications.

At the 2020 Book Fair, her poetry collection Lal Epitaph (Red Epitaph) was published again, featuring 70 poems.

== List of films ==
- Mister Bangladesh (2018) – Kumu

== Television ==
- Bairati (2004)
- Ek Nijhum Aranya (A Silent Forest) (2005)
- Palash Phuler Nolok (The Ornament of Palash Flowers)
- Kobi (Poet)
- Sakin Sarisuri
- Ah Football Bah Football (Ah Football Wow Football)
- Arman Bhai Birat Tension-e (Brother Arman in Great Tension)
- Chorkabbo (Ballad of Thieves)
- Aponghor (Own Home)
- Kobiraj Golap Shah (Herbal Healer Golap Shah) (2013)
- Alospur (Village of Laziness) (2013)
- Kortakahini (Tales of the Master) (2013)
- Buke Tar Chondoner Ghran (The Fragrance of Sandalwood on His Chest) (2013)
- Jyotiraj Tipu Sultan (King of Light Tipu Sultan) (2013)
- Election Election (2013)
- Chhobir Hat (Picture Bazaar) (2013)
- Pordar Arale Ke (Who is Behind the Curtain) (2013)
- Rupali O Rupali Pordar Golpo (Silver and Stories of the Silver Screen) (2013)
- Dui Bon (Two Sisters) (2013)
- Come to the Point (2014)
- Protipokkho (The Opponent) (2014)
- Mohua (2014)

== Literary works ==
=== Poetry collections ===
- Neel Foring Kabbo (The Blue Dragonfly Poems) (2017, Ananya Prokashoni)
- Lal Epitaph (Red Epitaph) (2018, Ananya Prokashoni)
- Tribhuja (Triangle) (2018, Tamralipi)
- Oshomoyer Chirkut (A Note from Untimely Hours) (2018, Chaitanya)
- Priyotomo Megh (Dearest Cloud) (2020, Annesha)
- Bhalobashar Epar Opar (This Side and That Side of Love) (2023, Ajab Prokash)
- Aloukik Shobder Ghran (The Scent of Magical Words) (2024, Ajab Prokash)

=== Novels ===
- Ekla Akash (The Lonely Sky) (2019, Tamralipi)
- Lipstick (2020, Annesha) (Annesha)
- Amar Ekta Tui Chai (I Want a You) (2021, Ananya)
- Iti Meghbalok (Farewell, Cloud Boy) (2021, Tamralipi)
- Ghuno Manush (The Rotten Human) (2022, Ananya)
- Rokkhok (The Guardian) (2023, Batighar)

=== Children’s books ===
- Shanarei O Tar Jadur Leitreng (Shanarei and Her Magical Leitreng) (2019, Ananya Prokashoni)
- Pebet (2024, Ikri-Mikri)
