= Tanin Subha =

Bangladeshi actress (1993–2025)

Tanin Rahman Subah (1993 – 2025), also known as Tanin Subha, was a Bangladeshi actress. She appeared in various television dramas and films in the Dhallywood film industry.

== Early life ==
Tanin Subha was born in Mollarhat, Kalkini upazila, Madaripur, Bangladesh. She spent her early years at her maternal grandparents' home in Barisal and also lived in Saudi Arabia for a time due to her father's employment.

== Career ==
Subha began her career in the entertainment industry by taking part in the audition round of the reality show "CloseUp 1" on 1 January 2012. She initially intended to pursue music but later focused on acting. She also participated in the dance competition "Mangoli Nacho Bangladesh Nacho" in 2012.

Her media involvement started with a television commercial, followed by her acting debut in the drama "Jamaj" opposite Mosharraf Karim and directed by Azad Kalam. She later appeared in various other television dramas.

Her first film role was in "Obastob Bhalobasha", although the film was not released. She later gained attention for her performance in "Matir Pori". After that, she acted in several other films. Some of them were released, and others were still waiting for release at the time of her death.

She was a member of the Bangladesh Film Artistes' Association.

== Works ==
=== Films ===
- Abastab Bhalobasha (unreleased)
- Matir Pori
- Bhalo Theko
- Tui Amar
- Demag
- Begum Jaan
- Bir Bangali
- Raja Ranir Golpo (Raja Rani's Story)
- Momer Putul
- Swapner Sathi
- Bir Mata (unreleased)
- Dui Rajkonna (unreleased)
- Premer Bandhon (unreleased)

=== Television Dramas ===
- Jamaj
- Alal Dulal
- Sheyana Jamai
- Marriage Media.com
- Aartir Pataka
- Mahanayak
- Raser Hadi Badabari
- Bad Girls
- Jamai Dui Nombri
- Vhazaila Gram
- Swapn Adda

== Awards ==
Tanin Subha received acknowledgments from several organizations for her contributions to film and television. These included the BABISAS Award (2016), Media Digit Star Award (2022), AJFB Award, 9th Mizaf Creative Award, SR Music Star Award (2022), and the JP TV Star Award.

== Illness and death ==
Subha's health declined on 2 June 2025. She was first treated at a clinic in Aftabnagar before being transferred to the ICU of a hospital in Banani as her condition worsened. She was later moved to a private hospital in Dhanmondi for further treatment and placed on life support.

After spending eight days on life support, she was pronounced dead on 10 June 2025 at the age of 31.

== See also ==
- Cinema of Bangladesh
- List of Bangladeshi film artists
