= Noor Imran Mithu =

Bangladeshi film actor and director

Noor Imran Mithu নূর ইমরান মিঠু
- Education: Khulna University
- Occupations: Actor; Director

Noor Imran Mithu is a Bangladeshi film actor and director.

== Career ==
Noor Imran Mithu made his debut in silver screen with Ant Story in 2014. For this film he was nominated for Meril Prothom Alo Awards 2014 in Best Debut Actor/Actress category. He directed two dramas for Channel I in 2016. In 2018 he made his debut as a film director with Komola Rocket.

== Awards ==
He was awarded in Jaffna International Cinema Festival in Sri Lanka as Best Debut Director and nominated for Meril Prothom Alo Awards in 2019 for this film.

== Filmography ==
=== Actor ===
Year	Film	Role	Note
2012	Television	Reporter	
2014	Ant Story	Mithu	Debut as lead role
2023	Peyarar Subash		
2023	Punormilone	Noyon	

=== Director ===
Key
†	Denotes films that have not yet been released

Year	Film	Director	Writer	Notes
2018	Komola Rocket	Yes	Yes	Debut film as a film director
2023	Patalghor	Yes	Yes	

== Awards and nominations ==
Year	Award	Category	Film	Result
2014	Meril Prothom Alo Awards	Best Debut Actor/Actress	Ant Story	Nominated
2019	Jaffna International Cinema Festival	Best Debut Director	Komola Rocket	Won
2019	Meril Prothom Alo Awards	Best Director	Komola Rocket	Nominated
