= Samroj Ajmi Alvi =

Bangladeshi actress

Sk Shamroz Azmy Alvee
- শেখ সামরোজ আজমী আলভী
- Born: Sk Shamroz Azmy Alvee; Kushtia, Khulna, Bangladesh
- Occupations: Actress, model
- Years active: 2007–present
- Known for: Harkipte
- Spouse: Md Amirul Islam (m. 2011)
- Children: 2
- Awards: Lux Channel I Superstar - 2007: First runner-up, Bachosus Award for Best Actress

Sk Shamroz Azmy Alvee (Bengali: শেখ সামরোজ আজমী আলভী) is a Bangladeshi actress and model. She became nationally known in 2007 when she finished as the first runner up in the Lux Channel I Superstar beauty pageant.

== Selected TV appearance ==
- Potro Mitali - ATN Bangla
- Harkipte
- Tin Gada
- Sohojatri – Banglavision
- Badshah Sir er Biye – NTV
- Tui Ke Amar - Asian TV
- Tahader Joubonkal - ATN Bangla
- Madvhai
- Jamay Mela
- Gulshan Avenues
- Ora Ko Jon
- The Public
- Osthir - ATN Bangla
- Comedy 420 – Boishakhi TV
- Rupali Prantor -
- Oloshpur – Rtv
- Tui Ki Amar - Asian TV
- Van Bostro Bitan
- Jhora Patar Golpo - Boishakhi TV
- Astha
- Megher Palok - Anando TV
- Bashontipur - Channel I
- Towt Plus
- Grihodaho - Boishakhi TV
- Shinduknama
- Patri Chai
- Patro Nirbachon
- Kanpora
- Confusion 2
- Bishkhoy
- Cratch
- Ek Je Silo Kripon Briddha
- Patapori
- Halkhata
- Bower doa poribohon
- Remote Control
- Bish Kinba valobasha
- Sonali swapno
- Pap Punno
- Australian Passport
- Tattu Ghora
- Chander Bow
- Pathorer Kanna etc

== Awards and nominations ==
- Lux Channel I Superstar - 2007: First runner-up, RTV Star award, Bachosus award, binodon bichitra award, TRAB award, Babisus award, Shako telefilm award etc
