= MGHS =

MGHS may refer to:

== Schools ==
- Mac.Robertson Girls' High School, Melbourne, Victoria, Australia
- Madison-Grant High School, Fairmount, Indiana, United States
- Maitland Grossmann High School, East Maitland, New South Wales, Australia
- Marysville Getchell High School, Marysville, Washington, United States
- Mohammadpur Government High School, Dhaka, Bangladesh
- Morgan Girls High School, Narayanganj, Bangladesh
- Monona Grove High School, Monona, Wisconsin, United States
- Mount Graham High School, Stafford, Arizona, United States

== Other ==
- Match Game-Hollywood Squares Hour, an American television game show
- MG HS, a compact crossover SUV
