= Ramnagar, Bangladesh =

Ramnagar
- Village
- Location of Bagra, Bangladesh and also Dinajpur
- Coordinates: 22°56′0″N 91°17′0″E
- Country: Bangladesh
- Division: Chittagong Division
- District: Feni District
- Elevation: 4 m (13 ft)
- Time zone: UTC+6 (BST)

Ramnagar is a village of Feni District in the Chittagong Division of Bangladesh. It is located at 22°56'0N 91°17'0E with an altitude of 4 metres (16 feet).
