= Mashiat Rahman =

Bangladeshi actress, model

Mashiat Tasnim Rahman
- Born: November 24, 1992 (age 33); Rangpur, Bangladesh
- Occupation: Actor • model • television personality
- Years active: 2010–present
- Spouse: S. M. Ehsanul Karim (m. 2013–present)
- Awards: Lux Channel i Superstar 2010 (4th)

Mashiat Tasnim Rahman is a Bangladeshi model, television personality, and actress. She is widely known for her participation in the 2010 edition of Lux Channel i Superstar.

== Early life and education ==
Mashiat was born on 24 November 1992 in Rangpur. She grew up there in a small family comprising her parents and a brother. She passed her Secondary School Certificate exams from Cantonment Public School and College, Rangpur and enrolled in the BBA program at North South University in Dhaka. She has "always been a good student."

== Career ==
Mashiat came into the spotlight by finishing in fourth place in the talent hunt Lux Channel i Superstar 2010. Her debut as a TV actor was opposite Chanchal Chowdhury in Salauddin Lavlu's Tritiyo Purush. Since then she has appeared on TV in more than two dozen serials and single episode plays.

Mashiat has emceed TV programmes, including Pepsi Change the Game and Style and Fashion.

She has done television commercials for Confidence Soybean oil, Pran Lychee Candy, Pran Sunny Orange Juice, and Airtel Ajibon Meyad.

== Television ==
| Year | Title | Role | Notes |
|---|---|---|---|
| | Tritiyo Purush | | Debut |
| | Punnyo Amar Desher Maati | | Telefilm debut |
| 2011 | Varsity | | Serial |
| 2011 | Terminal | | Serial |
| 2011 | Chader Nijer Kono Alo Nei | | Serial |
| 2011 | Chup Adalot Cholchhe | | Serial |
| 2011 | Generation Next Dot | | Serial |
| 2011 | Adhaar Periye | | Serial |
| 2011 | Khoy | | Serial |
| 2011 | Foo | | |
| 2011 | Jekhane Keu Nei | | |
| 2011 | Chhayabrita | | |
| 2011 | Hothat Dekha | | Single episode TV play |
| 2011 | Na Bola Nishedh | | Single episode TV play |
| 2011 | Otol Jatra | | Single episode TV play |
| 2011 | Pepsi Change the Game | Host | |
| 2011 | Style and Fashion | Host | |
| 2011–2012 | Priyo | | Serial |
| 2012 | Bashbo Valo | | |
| | Apon Apon Khela | | |
| | Bhetor Bahir | | |
| | No-man Island | | |
| | Ochena Protibimbo | | |
| | Music Jam | Host | |
| | Made in Bangladesh | Host | |
| 2013 | Ichche Ghuri | | |
| 2013 | Ichhadana | | Serial |
| 2015 | Ebhabe Chole Jeyo Na | | Tele-drama |
| 2015 | Kholos Bondi | | Tele-drama |
| 2016 | Sopner Qurbani | | |

== Awards ==
| Serial No. | Award | - | 1 | Lux Channel i Superstar | 4th |
