= Khijir Hayat Khan =

Bangladeshi filmmaker and actor

- খিজির হায়াত খান
- Occupations: Director, scriptwriter, actor
- Years active: 2007–present
- Notable work: Jaago

Khijir Hayat Khan is a Bangladeshi filmmaker and actor.

== Recognition ==
At a film festival, Khan won a best screenplay award for his film Ora 7 Jon. In 2024, he became a member of the Bangladesh Films Certificate Board.

== Filmography ==
=== Films ===
==== As director ====
Year	Film	Notes	Ref.
2007	Ostittey Amar Desh	Also writer of the film and played the role of Shadheen	
2010	Jaago	Also writer of the film. First Bangladeshi sports film and won 6 Awards at Film Award Bangla in the following categories: Best Film, Best Director, Best Music Director, Best Actress, Best Playback Singer Male and Best Sound Engineer.	
2016	Protiruddho		
2023	Ora 7 Jon	Also writer of the film.	

==== As actor ====
Year	Film	Role	Notes	Ref.
2018	Mr. Bangladesh	Ibrahim/Shafayet	He also wrote the film	

=== Short films ===
Year	Film	Notes	Ref.
2014	Eye for an Eye		

== Personal life ==
=== Threats ===
Police arrested two extremists accused of plotting to kill Khan. They said that the extremists targeted Khan because he co-wrote the screenplay "Mr Bangladesh", a film about thwarting terrorists that hit cinemas on 2018.
