= NGHS =

NGHS may refer to:

- Napier Girls' High School, Napier, New Zealand
- Nasirabad Government High School, Chittagong, Bangladesh
- Newport Girls High School, Newport, Shropshire, England
- North Garland High School, Garland, Texas, United States
- North Greene High School, Baileyton, Tennessee, United States
- North Gwinnett High School, Suwanee, Georgia, United States
- Northlands Girls' High School, Durban, KwaZulu-Natal, South Africa
- Northern Guilford High School, Greensboro, North Carolina, United States
- Northgate High School (Newnan, Georgia), United States
