= Nadia Afrin Mim =

Bangladeshi actress and model

- নাদিয়া আফরিন মিম
- Born: 12 October 1993 (age 32); Mymensingh, Bangladesh
- Occupations: Model, actress
- Years active: 2014–present
- Awards: Lux Channel I Superstar (2014); Closeup Miss Beautiful Smile (2014)

Nadia Afrin Mim is a Bangladeshi actress and model. She was the winner of Lux Channel I Superstar television reality show held in 2014.

== Career ==
Mim started her career with various television dramas and advertisements.

== Works ==
=== Selected dramas ===
1. Manush Hote Sabdhan
2. Bachelor Point (2018-2020)
3. Biye Birombona
4. Dushtu Cheler Dol
5. Life is Beautiful
6. Ahdunik Chele
7. Shuddho Mokled
8. Super Girls
9. Megher Pore Megh Jomese
10. X-Factor
11. X-Factor Reload
12. Chonnochara
13. Bideshi Para
14. Golpogulo Amader (2018)
15. Hawai Mithai (2020)
16. Family Friends (2022)
17. Network Busy (2022)
18. Beche Thakuk Bhalobasha
19. Kokhono Bujhte Chaoni
20. Kolaholer Por
21. Play Girl
22. The Hero
23. Sototar Kanna
24. Tomakei vebe
25. Voyangkor Biye
26. Elakar Jamai
27. Elakar Jamai 2
28. Tube Mate
29. Tomake Haranor Voy
30. Family Honeymoon
31. Shadi.com
32. Biporite Tumi Ami
33. BROTHERS
34. Dujone Anmone
35. Tear Gas
36. Only Friend
37. Lady Killer Driver Aziz
38. Mental Love
39. Manik Raton
40. Bhalo Hoye Jao
41. Bouer Boyfriend
42. Romantic Natok Nichok Prem
43. Blood Trip
44. Love Canvas
45. Senior Bou
46. Time Lapse
47. Biye Pagol Chele
48. Sentimental Love
49. Britto Kothon
50. Ekti Durbol Chitronatto
51. Boka Purush
52. Villain
53. The Gift
54. Valobasha O Osamapto Prem
55. Tricky Husband
56. Formula of love
57. Breakup Guru
58. Bokhate Premik
59. Probashir Ranga Bou
60. Biye Birombona
61. Apni Ekhono Moren Nai ?
62. The Last Page
63. Misti Dustu Prem
64. Nijesso Protibedok
65. Akjon Sogir Ali
66. Love Canvas
67. Pasher Barir Handsome
68. Mohamanno Premik
69. Megh Rajjer Konna
70. Sofol Premik
71. Kipta Dulavai
72. Binu
73. Tumi Amar Matha Betha
74. Pagol Na Ki Pagol Na
75. Divorce Chai Na
76. Eito besh achi
77. Bhai Ache Na
78. Bunomegh
79. Sorry Baba
80. Hero Amin
81. My Husband
82. BY THE WAY
83. Lukochuri Golpo
84. 35 & Single
85. Coronakal
86. Fande Poriya
87. Bachelor Dot Com
88. Tumi Ami She
89. Udvranto Prem
90. Biye Hobe
91. Upojukto Patro Chai
92. Torunima
93. Prem, Valobasha, Itadee..
94. Jal
95. Aral
96. Subconscious
97. Adhunik Chele
98. Chup Kotha
99. Tumi Robe Nirobe
100. Sondhey Rater Otithi
101. Ochena Premer Golpo
102. Krishno Pokkho
103. Long Distance
104. Sandwich
105. Juto Abiskar
106. All Rounder - 2
107. To Be or Not To Be
108. Kando Karkhana
109. Bachelor Prem
110. Bou Chai
111. Mukher Dike Dekhi
112. Abegi
113. Ghumhin Raater Golpo
114. Priyonty
115. End Game
116. Secret Love
117. Germophobia
118. Opekkha
119. Sporsher Shondhane
120. Mukhosher Ontorale
121. Dark Window
122. Life Support
123. Jodi Boro Hote Chao
124. Bakorkhani
125. Boyfriend
126. Ekta Poster
127. Nowakhailla Ghor Jamai

=== Advertisement ===
- Tibbet
- Pran

Awards and achievements
Preceded by Samia Said	Lux Channel I Superstar; 2014	Succeeded by Mim Mantasha
