= Mim Mantasha =

Bangladeshi model

- মিম মানতাসা
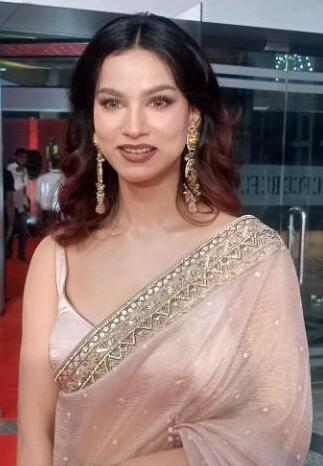
- Mantasha in 2025
- Born: 8 July 1996 (age 30); Pabna, Bangladesh
- Education: Jahangirnagar University (BFA)
- Occupation: Model
- Years active: 2018–present
- Title: Lux Channel I Superstar 2018
- Term: 11 May 2018-present

Mim Mantasha (Bengali: মিম মানতাশা; born 8 July 1995) is a Bangladeshi model, and the winner of Lux Channel I Superstar beauty pageant television reality in 2018.

== Early life ==
Mim Mantasha was born on 8 July 1996 in Pabna, Rajshahi. Her father is a government worker and mother is a housewife. Mim also has a younger brother. She spent her childhood in Pabna and completed schooling from Adarsha Girls High School. She have completed her HSC from Pabna Government Womens College. After which she moved to Dhaka, Bangladesh to complete her graduation. She is married to an Assistant Professor of IBA, University of Dhaka.

She won the Lux Channel I Superstar beauty pageant television reality show that was held in 2018. Sarwat Azad Brishti and Samia Akter Othoi were also chosen as the first runner-up and second runner-up of this beauty pageant.

== Credits ==
=== Television ===
List of Mim Mantasha television credits
Year	TV Drama Name	Co Artist	Director	Ref.
2018	Voboghure	Tahsan	Ferdous Hasan	
2018	Bristi Veja Ghor	Milon		

- Shesh Vromon | ATN Bangla

== Music video ==
- Shob Kothar Ek Kotha

=== Telefilm ===
- Roder Vitor Raat | Channel i TV
- Onudhabon | Channel i TV
- Pori | Channel i TV
- Ebong Valobasha
- Kora Likar | Channel i TV
- Tume Acho Ame Achi | Channel i TV

=== Web series ===
List of Mim Mantasha web series credits
Year	Title	OTT	Role	Co-Artist	Director	Notes
2019	Beauty and the Bullet	Bioscope	Rupa	Tahsan, Afran Nisho, Emon, Momo, Mim, Badhan Lincoln, Suborna Mustafa, Tariq Anam Khan	Animesh Aich	
2022	Jaale†			Nirab	Bandhan Biswas	

Awards and achievements
Preceded by Nadia Afrin Mim	Lux Channel I Superstar; 2018	Succeeded by
