= Sanjana Sarkar Riya =

Bangladeshi actress and model

- সানজানা সরকার রিয়া
- Occupations: Actress; model
- Years active: 2017–present

Sanjana Sarkar Riya (Bengali: সানজানা সরকার রিয়া) is a Bangladeshi actress and model who works in Bengali television dramas and web productions. She began her career as a model in a television commercial for Banglalink and later became known for her roles in the television series Family Crisis and Bachelor Point. She won the Best Emerging Actress award in the television category at the CJFB Performance Award 2020 for Bachelor Point.

== Career ==
Riya entered the entertainment industry as a model in a Banglalink television commercial. She subsequently appeared alongside Ziaul Faruq Apurba in the television drama Monobashona. She also appeared in short films produced for Pran Frooto Love Express.

Riya gained wider recognition after appearing in Mostafa Kamal Raj's television series Family Crisis. She later appeared in the second season of Kajal Arefin Ome's comedy series Bachelor Point. Manab Zamin reported in 2020 that she was working on Bachelor Point after gaining recognition through Family Crisis. Channel i later identified Family Crisis and Bachelor Point as the two productions that brought her the most recognition.

She also appeared in Kajal Arefin Ome's productions Propose and Female. In 2021, she appeared as Alisha in the web production Thanda. During the same period, she worked in a television commercial for the mobile financial service Nagad, directed by Mostofa Sarwar Farooki.

In 2022, Riya appeared opposite Niloy Alamgir in the television drama Girlfriend Jokhon Boss, directed by Osman Miraz. According to Channel i, the drama surpassed one million views on YouTube within fourteen hours of its release.

== Recognition ==
Riya was nominated for Best Emerging Actress in the television category at the CJFB Performance Award 2020 for her performance in Bachelor Point. The other nominees in the category were Keya Payel for Hoyto Tomari Jonno and Sarika Saba for Family Crisis. She subsequently won the award.

== Selected works ==
| Year | Title | Type | Role |
|---|---|---|---|
| 2019 | Bachelor Eid | Television film | Riya |
| 2019 | Family Crisis | Television series | Shishir |
| 2020 | Stadium | Television film | Jennifer |
| 2020 | Propose | Short film | — |
| 2020–2021 | Bachelor Point | Television series | Riya |
| 2021 | Female | Television film | — |
| 2021 | Thanda | Web production | Alisha |
| 2021 | The Secret | Television film | — |
| 2022 | Bachelor's Ramadan | Television film | Riya |
| 2022 | Bachelor's Qurbani | Television film | Riya |
| 2022 | Girlfriend Jokhon Boss | Television drama | — |

== Awards and nominations ==
| Year | Award | Category | Work | Result |
|---|---|---|---|---|
| 2020 | CJFB Performance Award | Best Emerging Actress | Bachelor Point | Won |
