= Mr. Bangladesh (film) =

- Movie Poster
- Directed by: Abu Akhter Ul Iman
- Written by: Khijir Hayat khan and Hasnat Piash
- Produced by: Khijir Hayat khan
- Starring: Khijir Hayat khan; Shanarei Devi Shanu; Shahriar Ferdous Sazeeb
- Music by: Nazmul Abedin Abir
- Production company: KHK Productions
- Distributed by: Jaaz Multimedia
- Release date: 16 November 2018
- Country: Bangladesh
- Language: Bengali

Mr. Bangladesh (Bengali: মিস্টার বাংলাদেশ) is a 2018 Bangladeshi action revenge thriller film directed by Abu Akhter Ul Iman and written by Khijir Hayat khan and Hasnat Piash. Khijir Hayat Khan produced the film under the banner of KHK Productions. The film was released on 16 November 2018.

== Cast ==
- Khijir Hayat Khan as Ibrahim/Shafayet
- Shanarei Devi Shanu as Kumu
- Shahriar Ferdous Sazeeb as Mahmud
- Tiger Robi as Carlos
- Shamim Hasan Sarkar as Habib
- Asif Chowdhury as Farid
- Marion Pallegrin as Marion
- Hamidur Rahman as Senior ASP Hamid

== Production ==
=== Filming ===
The film was filmed in various locations of Chittagong

== Music ==
Nazmul Abedin Abir was the music director of the film. All of the songs lyrics were done by Khijir Hayat Khan and the title track was done by Dreek

No.	Title	Singer(s)	Length
1	Tumi Je Amar	Kumar Bishwajit	5:07
2	Ekhoni chole jeona	Nazmul Abedin Abir	3:28
3	Jao Dilam Jete	Dinat Jahan Munni & Nazmul Abedin Abir	5:28
4	Kacher Deyal	Nazmul Abedin Abir	5:16
5	Title Track	Dreek	4:18
Total			23:37

== Release ==
The film released on 16 November 2018 worldwide. The film came out in streaming platform on 27 June 2022 in Bongo BD
