= Tasnova Hoque Elvin =

Bangladeshi actress, model and television presenter

- তাসনোভা হক এলভিন
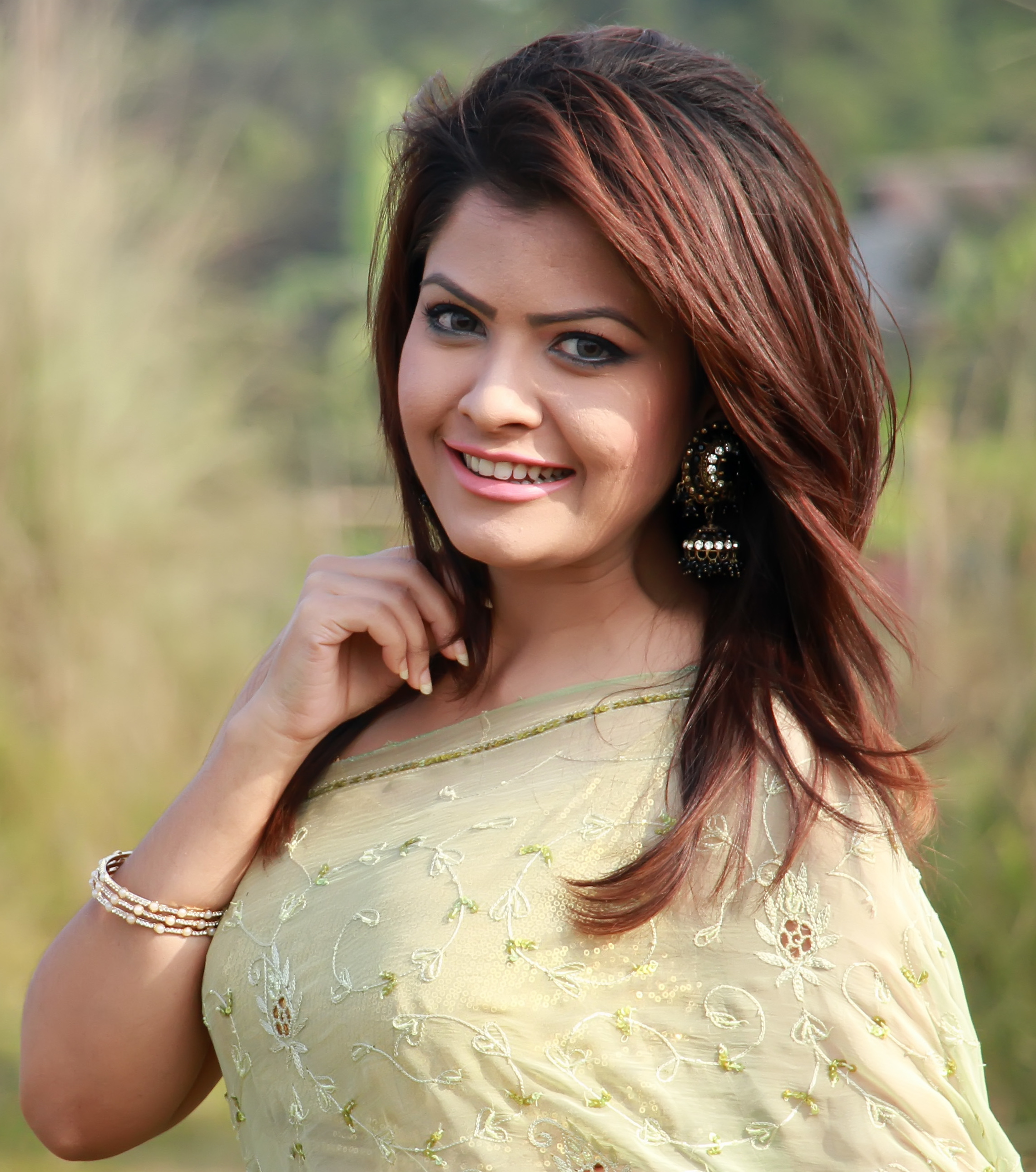
- Born: 26 April 1990 (age 36); Brahmanbaria, Bangladesh
- Education: American International University-Bangladesh
- Occupations: Actress and model
- Years active: 2010 – present
- Spouse: Fahad Riazi

Tasnova Hoque Elvin (Bengali: তাসনোভা হক এলভিন; born 26 April 1990) better known as Tasnova Elvin is a Bangladeshi actress and model. Tasnova Elvin began her journey in showbiz as a top 15 contestant in Lux Channel I Superstar 2010, but soon broke out as an actor. She has appeared in Bachelor Point, among other television drama series.

== Early life ==
Elvin was born in Brahmanbaria, Bangladesh to Ferdowsi and Fazlul Haque, a businessman.

During her second year at university, Elvin was a top 15 contestant in Lux Channel I Superstar 2010. She completed her Bachelor of Business Administration from American International University-Bangladesh.

== Career ==
Elvin started her career with television advertisement Pran Mango Juice Pack.

She presented the show Anya Alor Gaana on Boishakhi Television. Her first acting role was either in director Taher Shipon's Alice in Wonderland or his Bhengey Jawa Swapnogulo with Chanchal Chowdhury (sources disagree about which came first). In 2016, she modeled for the music video of Hriday Khan's song "Tumi Amar" and anchored the comedy show Haw Kaw Show.

== Personal life ==
Elvin married Fahad Riazi, a merchandiser, on 26 March 2017.

== Filmography ==
=== TV dramas and telefilms ===
- Alice in Wonderland
- Bhengey Jawa Swapnogulo
- Paraspar
- Nostalgia Cathedral
- Tini Ekke Safesidewala
- Uramon (2015)
- Daag (2015)
- Nine and a Half
- Room Date
- I Hate Football
- Bideshi Para
- Hospital
- Jamai Shoshur
- Shato Danar Projapati (2016)
- Bisorjon (2016)
- Ek Saat Saat Ek (2016)
- Prothom Bhalolaga (2016)
- Sentimental (2016)
- Sentimental Selim
- Back Benchers (2016)
- Noy Choy (2016)
- Shunnyotai (2016)
- Tilottoma-Z
- Amader Bhalobasha (2018)
- Chutir Ghonta (2018)
- Ektu Valobashar Onugolpo (2018)
- Notun Diner Joddha (2018)
- Bachelor Point (2018)
- Mr. Tension(2018)
- Welcome Club (2018)
- Digbaji (2018)
- Khandani Manzil (2018)
- Just Chill (2018)
- Kacher Putul (2018)
- Raat-er Gari
- Osthir Oshosti By Mango Squad
- Before Marriage Vs After Marriage By Mango Squad
- Shada Kagoj e Sajano Onuvuti
- Tomato Catchup
- Maya
- Chewing Gum
- Tini Amader Bokor Bhai
- Mr. and Mrs Patoway
- Celebrity Bua
- Break up Story
- The Destination Wedding
- Rolling in the deep
- Village Cup
- Masti Reloaded
- Invitation
- Polatok Shomoy Othoba Prem
- Shomoyer Golpo Rater Gari
- Logically illogical
- Khola Asman
