= Shahaduz Zaman =

- শাহাদুজ্জামান
- Education: Chittagong Medical College; University of Amsterdam (PhD)
- Occupations: Writer, medical anthropologist
- Writing career
- Genres: Fiction, essay

Shahaduz Zaman (Bengali: শাহাদুজ্জামান) is a writer in Bengali literature. He is a medical anthropologist and a trained physician. He published over 30 books in different genres. He won the Bangla Academy Literary Award in 2016 in the fiction category.

== Education and professional life ==
Shahaduz Zaman was born in Bangladesh. He attended Mirzapur Cadet College for his high school studies. He studied medicine at Chittagong Medical College. He studied public health and obtained a doctorate in medical anthropology from the University of Amsterdam in 2003. As of 2021, he works at the medical school of the University of Sussex. Besides his literary work, he has numerous academic publications.

== Literary works and style ==
Among his most important books are Crutch-er Colonel (Colonel on a Crutch), "Poshchimer Meghe Shonar Shingho" (Golden Lion on the Western Clouds), "Koyekti Bihbol Golpo" (Several Awe-inspiring Stories), "Kotha-Porompora" (Interviews), "Ekti Haspatal, Ekjon Nri-biggani O Koekti Bhanga Har" (A Hospital, an Anthropologist and Some Broken Bones), and "Bishorgo-te Dukkho" (M for Melancholy).

Shahaduz Zaman is noted for his experimentation with short stories and a distinct style of prose writing. He combines elements of modern-day story-telling with sharp observations of society. In several of his biographical fictions such as "Ekjon Komolalebu" and "Crutch-er Colonel", he combined imagination with historical facts and analysis, and thus breaking away from the rigid definition of a novel. His book "Bishorgo-te Dukkho" (M for Melancholy) has been considered a meta-fiction, one of the first of this genre in Bengali. The book "Kotha-Porompora" (Interviews), which is a set of interviews of prominent writers, artists and thinkers, is considered one of the best book of interviews in Bengali. He is also well regarded for his columns, essays, and film criticism.

Several of his stories and books have been made into films and stage dramas. A movie called Komola Rocket (The Orange Ship) was based on two of his short stories, and furthermore, he wrote the screenplay for the movie. A stage drama based on Crutch-er Colonel (Colonel on a Crutch) had many shows throughout Bangladesh, and has been popular with both spectators and critics. Several short films have been made from his stories as well.

"Ibrahim Buksh's Circus and Other Stories" is an anthology of some of his stories in English. His thesis "Broken Limbs, Broken Lives: Ethnography of a Hospital Ward in Bangladesh" is a medical anthropology work in the context of Bangladesh. He wrote a critically acclaimed popular book based on this - "Ekti Haspatal, Ekjon Nri-biggani O Koekti Bhanga Har" (A Hospital, an Anthropologist and Some Broken Bones).

== Selected books ==
=== Short stories ===
- Koyekti Bihbol Golpo (Several Awe-inspiring Stories)
- Poshchimer Meghe Shonar Shingho (Golden Lion on the Western Clouds)
- Kesher Are Pahar (Hair-Veiled Mountain)
- Onno Ek Golpokakrer Golpo Nie Golpo (Tale of Another Storyteller's Story)
- Ibrahim Buksh's Circus and Other Stories (Translated by Sonia Amin)
- Golpo, Ogolpo, Na-Golpo Songroho (Story, Non-story, Anti-story: A Collection)
- Mamlar Shakkhi Moina Pakhi (Myna Bird, the Case Witness)

=== Fiction ===
- Bishorgo-te Dukkho (M for Melancholy)
- Crutch-er Colonel (Colonel on a Crutch)
- Khaki Chottorer Khoary (Khaki Campus Hangover)
- Andho Ghume Castro'r Shonge (With Castro in Hallucination)
- Ekjon Komolalebu (Reincarnation as an Orange: The Story of Jibanananda)

=== Essays, columns ===
- Tukro Bhabna (Thought Fragments)
- Chirkut (Notes)
- Lekhalekhi (On Writings)
- Shahbag 2013 (Shahbag 2013)
- Elias-er Shundarban O Onnanno (Sundarban of Elias and Other Essays)
- Google Guru

=== Research ===
- Ekti Haspatal, Ekjon Nri-biggani O Koekti Bhanga Har (A Hospital, an Anthropologist and Some Broken Bones)
- Broken limbs, broken lives : ethnography of a hospital ward in Bangladesh

=== Interviews ===
- Kotha-Porompora (Interviews)
- Durogami Kothar Vetor (Long Conversations)

=== Films ===
- Chaplin, Ajo Chomotkar (Chaplin, Ever Mesmerizing)
- Bioscope, Cholocchitro Proviti (Bioscope, Films, etc.)
- Ibrahim Buksh's Circus (Ibrahim Buksh's Circus, a Screenplay)

=== Translation ===
- Bhabna Bhashantor (Thoughts Translated)
- Kangaroo Dekhar Shreshtho Din O Onnanno Onubad Golpo (A Perfect Day for Kangaroo and Other Translated Stories)

=== Travelogue ===
- Amsterdam Diary O Onnano (Amsterdam Diary and Other Travels)

=== Edited ===
- Akhtaruzzaman Elias-er Diary (Diary of Akhtaruzzaman Elias)
- Dekha Na Dekhar Chokh

== Awards ==
- Mowla Brothers Literary Award in 1996
- Bangla Academy Literary Award in 2016
- City Bank Ananda Alo Literary Award 2019
