= Basic Ali =

Bangladeshi comic strip

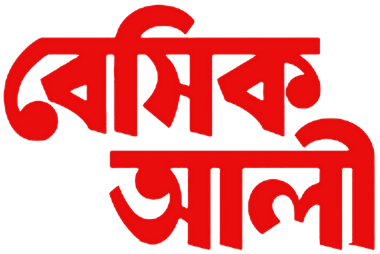
- Author(s): Shahrier Khan
- Launch date: November 26, 2006; 18 years ago
- Syndicate(s): Basic Ali Studio
- Genre(s): Humor

Basic Ali is a Bangladeshi comic strip written and illustrated by Sharier Khan, first published on November 26, 2006, in Prothom Alo. It has been adapted into a TV series on Channel i and renewed for a third season in February 2018.

== History ==
Basic Ali was launched on 26 November 2006 as a strip in Prothom Alo on the editorial page.

== Story ==
The family and friends of Basic Ali

The story is Centered around the Ali family. Basic Ali is the oldest son of the family. His father is Talib Ali, a prominent loan defaulter, owner of Ali Group of Industries, and his mother is a housewife named Molly Ali whose sometimes called by as "Madest". His little sister is Nature Ali who is a medical student and his little brother named Magic is a school student. Outside the family, Basic's close friend, Hillol, and Basic's press office colleague and love interest Riya Haque, are also frequently turned around.

== Media ==
=== Television ===
Casting for a TV show based on Basic Ali started in 2017 and it was the first comic character in Bangladesh to be adapted on the screen. After the end of season one it was renewed for season two.

== Characters ==
- Basic Ali: the main character of this cartoon. He's a university graduate who is lazy by nature.
- Talib Ali: Basic Ali's father and a prominent loan defaulter.
- Molly Ali: Ali's mother sometimes addressed as ''Madest''
- Nature Ali: Basic Ali's younger sister who is a medical student.
- Magic Ali: Basic Ali's younger brother. A brilliant yet very mischievous student.
- Hillol: Basic Ali's close friend.
- Riya Haque: Basic Ali's love interest and office colleague.
