= Tawsif Mahbub =

Bangladeshi actor

- তৌসিফ মাহবুব
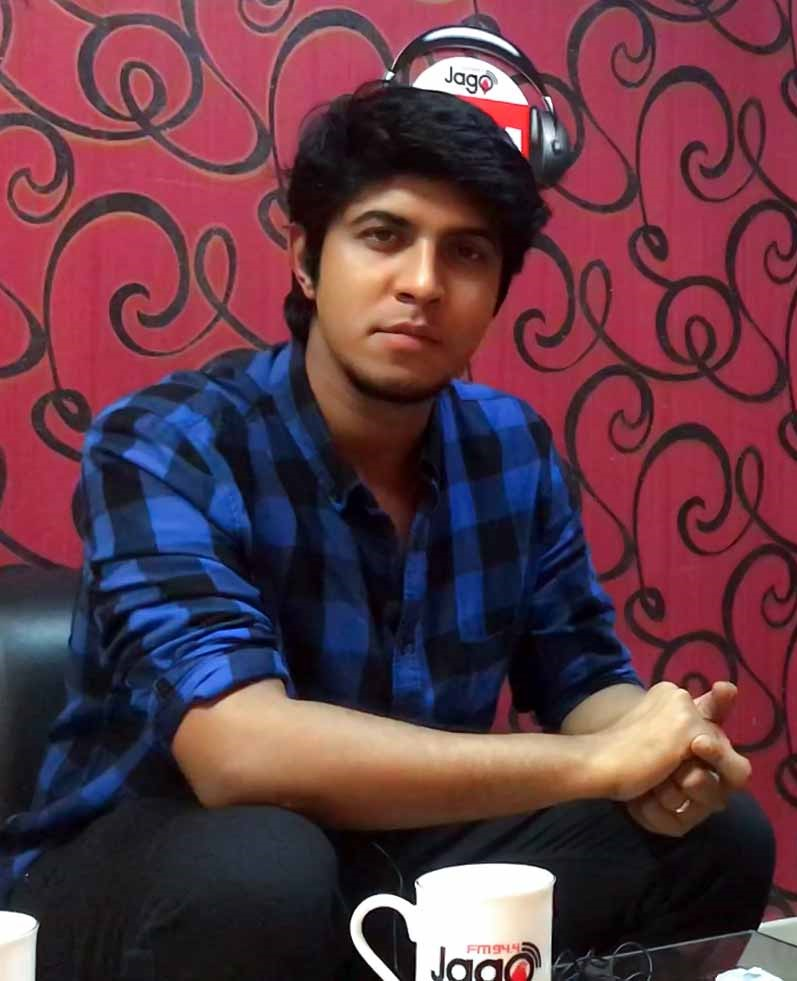
- Tawsif in an interview in 2019
- Born: Tawsif Mahbub; 27 October 1990 (age 36); Bhola, Bangladesh
- Education: St. Joseph Higher Secondary School American International University-Bangladesh
- Occupation: TV actor
- Years active: 2013–present
- Spouse: Jannatul Ferdous Zara (m. 2018)
- Parent(s): Mahbub Alam; Sultana Parveen
- Website: www.facebook.com/TawsifMahbub

Tawsif Mahbub (born 27 October 1990) is a Bangladeshi actor and model who has performed in many of television dramas, music videos and short films.

== Early life and education ==
Mahbub was born in Daulatkhan, Bhola. He attended Oxford International School in Dhaka and passed his O Levels. He completed a BSc in electrical and electronic engineering from American International University-Bangladesh in 2011 before turning to acting.

== Television ==
- @18 - All Time Dourer Upor (2013)
- Abak Agentuk (2013)
- Black Magic (2013)
- Land Phoner Din Gulote Prem (2013)
- Jababar (2014)
- Nisshongo Sherpa (2014)
- Facebook and I-Stories (2014)
- Calling Bell (2014)
- Shadhinota 26 O Kichu Joddha (2014)
- Na Manush (2014)
- Dui Ongsher Shesh Ektai (2014)
- Dost Dushman (2015)
- Nine and a Half (2015)
- Jhalmuri (2015)
- Dushtu Chheler Dol (2015)
- Ekdin Chhuti Hobe (2015)
- Onakankhito Satya (2015)
- Bondhutto Ebong Bhalobasha (2016)
- Focal Point (2016)
- Shomporko (2016)
- Bicycle Prem (2017)
- Nil Abaran (2017)
- Basic Ali (2017)
- Millionaire from Barishal ( 2017)
- Ami Tomar Golpo Hobo (2018)
- Bachelor Point (2018)
- Epitaph (2018)
- Cholo Prem Kori (2018)
- High Volume (2021)
- 2521 (2021)
- Biye Shadi (2021)
- 300 Takar Prem 100 Taka (2021)
- Aparajita (2021)
- Mayer Daak (2021)
- Joint Family (2021)
- Phone Number (2022)
- Night Show (2022)
- Pum Machine (2022)
- Super Boyfriend (2022)
- MorichBati (2022)
- HomeMate
- "Hajot" (2024)

=== Web series ===
- List (2017)
- Abashik Hotel (2018)
- Chokro -1 (2024)
- Chokro - 2 (2026)

== Awards and nominations ==
- BIFA Awards (2026) - OTT - Best Actor (Popular)
