= Ishrat Jahan Chaity =

Actor

- ইসরাত জাহান চৈতি
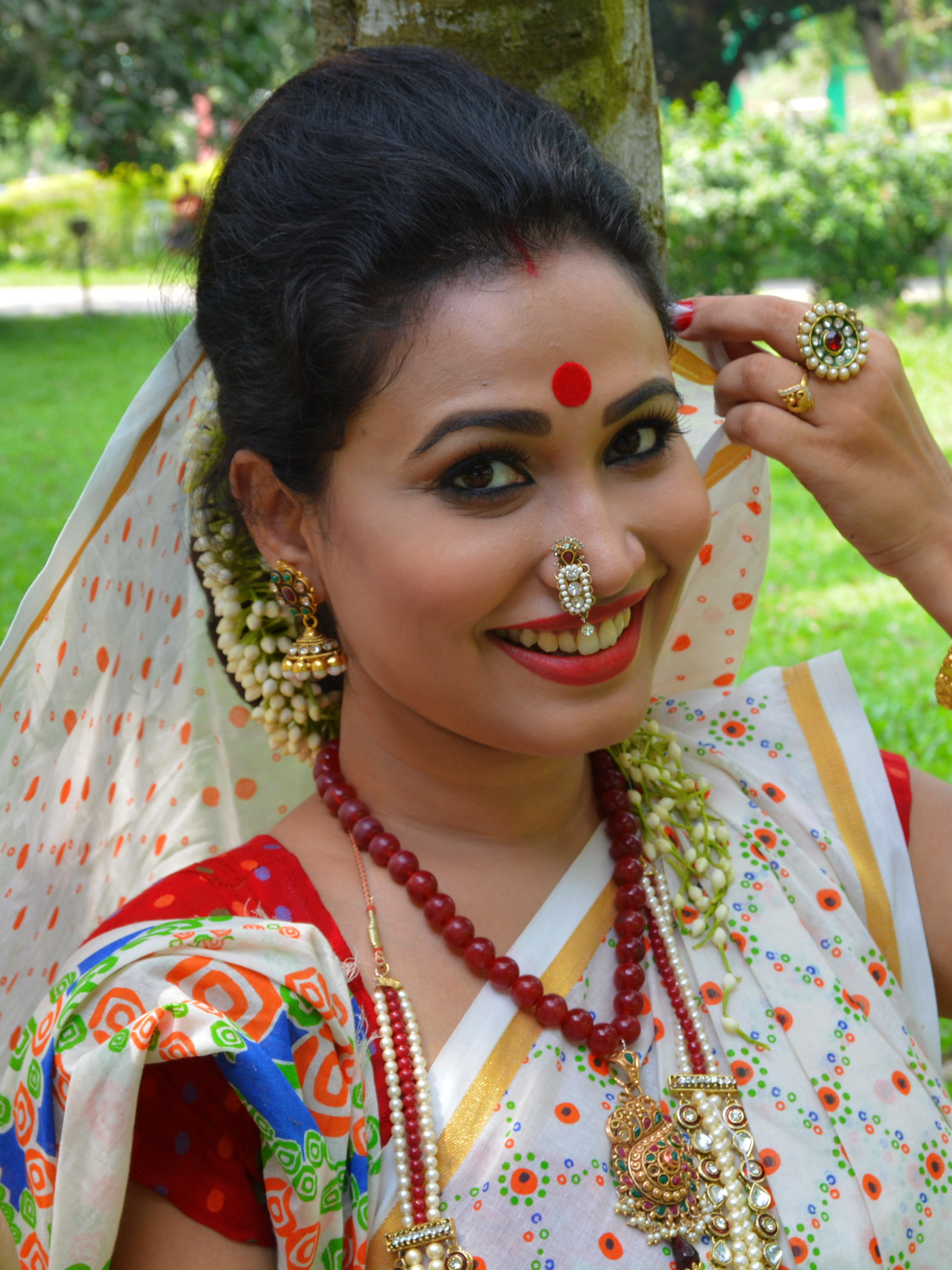
- Chaity in 2016
- Occupation: Actor
- Years active: 2000–present
- Title: Lux Channel I Superstar 2008

Ishrat Jahan Chaity is a Bangladeshi film actress and Lux Channel I Superstar 2008 winner.

== Career ==
Chaity began her career in acting after winning the Lux Channel I Superstar in 2008. She played as lead cast member Sadharon Meye on 2009 television drama Rabindranath Tagore. After transitioning into film, she had her breakthrough role in Rabeya Khatun's drama-film Madhumati (2011), which was a huge success among critics.

Chaity made her film debut with Riaz in Madhumati (2011), a film produced by Impress Telefilms. Her next film, Lovely, earned her the Best Actress nomination at Meril Prothom Alo Awards.

== Filmography ==
- Madhumati (2011)
- Lovely (2013)
- Mon Debo Mon Nebo (2018)
- Goendagiri (2019)

== Television ==
- Mukim Brothers (2010)
- Shadharaon Meye (2019)
- Khelowar
- Moddhobortini
- Maan Oviman (2019-2022)

Awards and achievements
Preceded by Bidya Sinha Saha Mim	Lux Channel I Superstar; 2008	Succeeded by Mehazabien Chowdhury
