= MIB1 =

Human enzyme

Identifiers
- Aliases: MIB1, DIP-1, DIP1, LVNC7, MIB, ZZANK2, ZZZ6, mindbomb E3 ubiquitin protein ligase 1, MIB E3 ubiquitin protein ligase 1
- External IDs: OMIM: 608677; MGI: 2443157; GeneCards: MIB1
Available structures
PDB	Ortholog search: PDBe RCSB
PDB	List of PDB id codes 4TSE, 4XI6, 4XI7, 4XIB
Enzyme activity
EC #	BRENDA	ExPASy	KEGG	MetaCyc
2.3.2.27	↗	↗	↗	↗

Gene location (Human)
Chr.	Chromosome 18 (human)
Band	18q11.2	Start	21,704,957 bp
Band	18q11.2	End	21,870,953 bp

Gene location (Mouse)
Chr.	Chromosome 18 (mouse)
Band	18|18 A1	Start	10,725,548 bp
Band	18|18 A1	End	10,818,704 bp
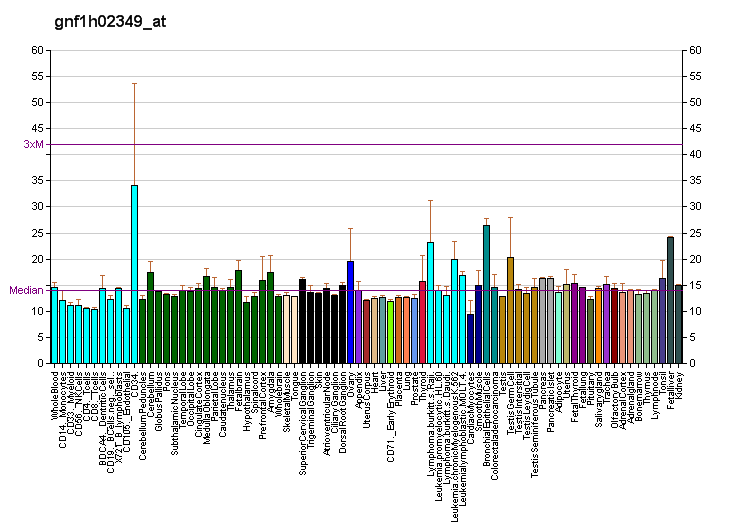

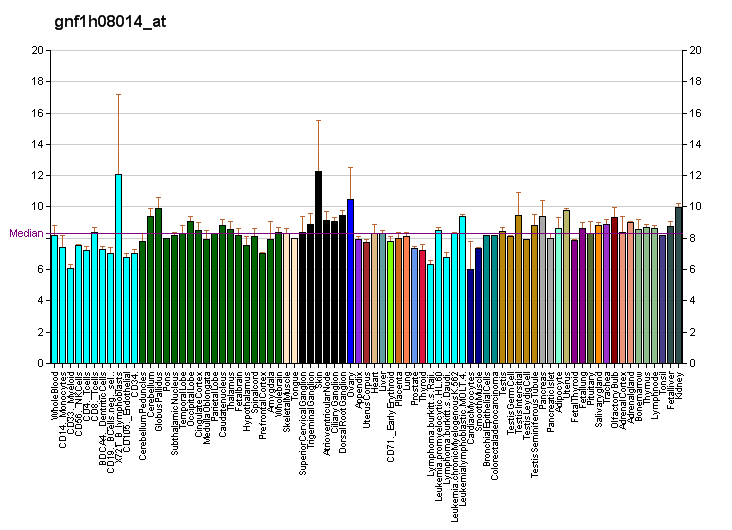

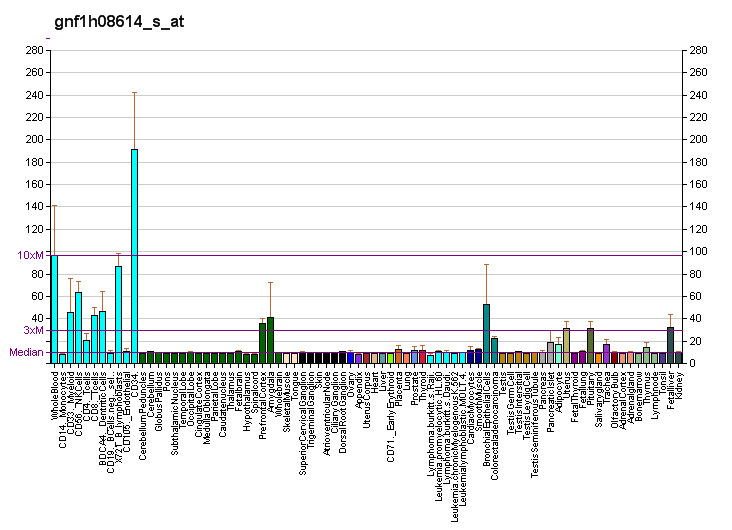
RNA expression pattern
Bgee	Human / Mouse (ortholog); Top expressed in: corpus epididymis; tibia; nipple; caput epididymis; parietal pleura; tail of epididymis; cartilage tissue; corpus callosum; visceral pleura; secondary oocyte / Top expressed in: spermatid; parotid gland; ciliary body; ureter; dentate gyrus of hippocampal formation granule cell; lacrimal gland; iris; Region I of hippocampus proper; dorsal striatum; spermatocyte; More reference expression data
BioGPS	More reference expression data
Gene ontology
Molecular function	zinc ion binding; metal ion binding; protein binding; ubiquitin-protein transferase activity; transferase activity
Cellular component	cytoplasm; cytosol; centrosome; membrane; postsynaptic density; plasma membrane; microtubule organizing center; cytoskeleton; cytoplasmic vesicle
Biological process	somitogenesis; endocytosis; negative regulation of neuron differentiation; in utero embryonic development; heart looping; positive regulation of endocytosis; development of the heart; blood vessel development; protein ubiquitination; neural tube formation; Notch signaling pathway
Sources:Amigo / QuickGO
Orthologs
Databases	NCBI: entry; OMA: entry
Species	Human	Mouse
Entrez	57534	225164
Ensembl	ENSG00000101752	ENSMUSG00000024294
UniProt	Q86YT6	Q80SY4
RefSeq (mRNA)	NM_020774	NM_144860; NM_001364997
RefSeq (protein)	NP_065825	NP_659109; NP_001351926
Location (UCSC)	Chr 18: 21.7 – 21.87 Mb	Chr 18: 10.73 – 10.82 Mb
PubMed search
- Wikidata
View/Edit Human	View/Edit Mouse

E3 ubiquitin-protein ligase Mind Bomb 1 (MiB1) is an enzyme that in humans is encoded by the MIB1 gene. It is involved in regulating apoptosis.

== Confusion with proliferative marker ==
An antibody directed at the protein Ki-67, a product of the MKI67 gene, is called MIB-1.
