= Mahbuba Islam Rakhi =

- মাহবুবা ইসলাম রাখি
- Born: 21 July 1993 (age 32); Dhaka, Bangladesh
- Other name: Rakhi Mahbuba
- Occupations: Engineer, actress
- Years active: 2011–present
- Awards: Lux Channel I Superstar 2010, Diamond World Channel i best Model

Mahbuba Islam Rakhi (born 21 July 1993) is a Bangladeshi Australian engineer and actress.

== Early life ==
Rakhi won the Bangladeshi beauty pageant Lux Channel I Superstar as a teenager in 2010. She moved to Australia in 2013 to pursue her higher studies and graduated with a first class honours from Edith Cowan University as a civil engineer in 2017. Originally from Bangladesh, she currently lives in Perth, Western Australia. She stepped into the media in 2011 through the drama Bishmoy written by Bipasha Hayat and directed by Tauquir Ahmed. She has appeared in a television commercial for Seylon Gold Tea; in dramas Chena Mukh Ochena Mukh, Bichcheder por; and has hosted the reality TV show Handsome the ultimate man.

== Education ==
Rakhi studied in English medium. She went to Eminent International College in Gulshan and completed her O levels and A levels in Dhaka under the British Council. In 2013 Rakhi moved to Australia to pursue higher studies in civil engineering. She graduated in 2017 with a Bachelor of Civil Engineering (Honours) degree from the Edith Cowan University in Perth, Australia with a first class honours. During her degree she was among the top 100 university students, was the top civil engineering student and volunteered as the vice president of the women in engineering committee (WIEECU) to increase participation of women in STEMM.

In 2019 Rakhi graduated with a Diploma of Screen Performance degree in screen acting from the Western Australian Academy of Performing Arts. Rakhi auditioned and applied for the diploma of acting course in WAAPA in November 2018 and was selected as one of the potential 26 out of some 300 plus applicants from all over Australia. Rakhi is currently signed with Moore Creative Artists (MCA).

== Career ==
While in Bangladesh, Rakhi had a career as an actress, model and host and worked from 2011 and 2013 before moving to Australia. Rakhi started her acting career with Bisshoy, a TV drama written by Bipasha Hayat and directed by Tauquir Ahmed. The she worked on TV drama Aronno Monjuri directed by Abul Hayat. Rakhi has worked in several dramas directed by Chayanika Chowdhury with her co-actor Ziaul Faruq Apurba including Chena Mukh Achena Mukh, Bisseder por. She was a cast in Terminal on NTV. Rakhi had a guest appearance in the music video Your Love sung by Kona.

Rakhi and actor Mosharraf Karim have appeared together in a few dramas, and on 2013 Eid season, they were paired against each other for an Eid special six episode drama Mirzafar Mir. She also starred in five other TV shows in 2013, including Emotional Abdur Motin, Ekta Gopon Kotha Chhilo Bolbar, and Adhare Aalo.

Rakhi Mahbuba is a structural engineer and started working in the mining industry at John Wood Group in 2017 as a graduate engineer. She worked on the Gruyere Gold mine project and the Kemerton Lithium Project in Western Australia. Rakhi continued both working as a full-time engineer and a full-time student at WAPPA in 2019. Completing her degree in November 2019 by showcasing her showreel in halls in Perth, Sydney and Melbourne.

== Awards and nominations ==
- Best Model Female - Diamond World Channel I Best Award 2011 : Won
- Lux Channel I Superstar 2010: Won
- Diamond World-Channel i Best Award: Won Best female model.

== Dramas ==
Year	Drama	Co-stars	Director	Notes
2011	Bishmoy		Tauquir Ahmed	
	Aronno Monjuri		Abul Hayat	
	Bichcheder Por	Apurbo, Laila Hasan	Chayanika Chowdhury	
	Chena Mukh Ochena Mukh	Apurbo	Chayanika Chowdhury	
	Bou Bhata	Apurbo		
	Fall in Love	Nisho		
	Onnomon	Kollan		
2013	Ekta Gopon Kotha Chhilo Bolbar			
2013	Adhare Aalo			
	Adharer Obashan	Mahfuz Ahmed, Nipun, Orsha		
	Terminal			
	Mirzafar Mir	Mosharraf Karim		
	Pain in Love	Nisho		
2013	Emotional Abdur Motin			
	Barabari	Mosharraf Karim		
	Tumi Amar	Apurbo, Hasan Imam, Afruza Banu	Chayanika Chowdhury	
