= MGH Group =

Bangladeshi conglomerate

MGH Group is a Singapore headquartered Bangladeshi multinational conglomerate. MGH operates in supply chain solutions, travel & hospitality, food & beverage chain, media & entertainment, express delivery and on-demand transportation. It represents seven shipping lines in Bangladesh.

Anis Ahmed is the founder and global CEO of MGH Group. M. Ghaziul Haque is the chairman of MGH Group.

== History ==
MGH was established in 1992 by Anis Ahmed who named it after his father Mohammed Ghaziul Haque. It began contract logistics by shipping Gillette products for the Bangladeshi market. Thereafter, it worked with companies like P&G, Carrefour, and C&A.

In 1996, MGH partnered with international travel company Travel port to provide distribution, technology, payment solutions for the travel and tourism industry in Bangladesh. It expanded to India in 2005. It hired Impact PR for its public relations.

MGH also acquired a large share in a Bangladeshi private commercial bank named Eastern Bank Limited. M. Ghaziul Haque, chairman of MGH Group, and Anis Ahmed, Group CEO of MGH Group, are directors of Eastern Bank Limited. Ahmed served as the chairman of Eastern Bank Limited from 2000 to 2006 and was re-elected in 2012.

Finlays was partnered by the conglomerate which is now the second largest tea producer in Bangladesh contributing 23% to the country's annual production.

In 2006, Radio Foorti, another subsidiary of MGH Group, first went live in Dhaka. It is now the largest FM Radio Channel in Bangladesh and operates in Dhaka, Chittagong, Rajshahi, Khulna, Barisal, Mymensingh, Cox's Bazar, Bogra and Noakhali. MGH bought the Barista Lavazza coffee chain in Bangladesh through its subsidiary MGH Restaurants Private Limited. It also brought Nando's to Bangladesh. It merged the marketing activities of Procter & Gamble and Gillette.

In 2009, MGH Group provided financial support to repatriate nine Bangladeshi prisoners from Pakistan. It provided financial support to the Autistic Children's Welfare Foundation, Bangladesh.

Managing Director of MGH Group, Anis Ahmed, was appointed the honorary counsel of South Africa to Bangladesh. MGH Group provided financial support to repatriate 20 Bangladeshi prisoners from Tanzania who were detained on their way to South Africa from Uganda. It provided financial support to repatriate a female Bangladeshi worker from Lebanon. It provided financial support to repatriate 17 Bangladeshis from Egypt.

Omron Healthcare appointed MGH Group its distributor in Bangladesh in 2018. It provided financial backing to Obhai and Obon, ride sharing service. MGH Group's subsidiary, MGH Health, became the local partner of AstraZeneca in March 2019.

During the coronavirus pandemic, MGH Group transported medical supplies to India in conjunction with SpiceJet.

In July 2022, MGH Group opened the flagship branch of its Peyala Cafe, under MGH Restaurants Private Limited, in Banani 11. It sponsored MGH Monsoon Cup Golf Tournament at Savar Golf Club.

MGH Restaurants Pvt Limited filed a complaint against FoodPanda with the Bangladesh Competition Commission following which FoodPanda was fined one million BDT. It sponsored the CAPA India Aviation Summit in 2024.

=== Controversy ===
In February 2020, the Anti-Corruption Commission investigated Anis Ahmed on corruption and money laundering charges. It filed a case against Anis Ahmed for acquiring BDT 1.36 billion illegally and money laundering in December 2022. After the resignation of Prime Minister Sheikh Hasina, the commission stated that it was forced to file the case against Ahmed by Salman F Rahman, advisor to Prime Minister Sheikh Hasina. On 14th October 2024 court approved the withdrawal request from the Anti-Corruption Commission after reviewing the documents of the case, which was filed against Anis Ahmed on 28 December 2022. Anti-Corruption Commission said there was no evidence against him to proceed with this case.

== Subsidiaries ==
- Bangladesh Express Co (BANEX), agent of Federal Express Corporation.
- Global Travel Distribution
- Elevate Solutions Limited, partnership with Microsoft Bangladesh
- International Brands Limited, distributor of Procter & Gamble and Gillette in Bangladesh.
- MGH Logistics, headquartered in Singapore
- MGH Healthcare distributor of AstraZeneca.
- MGH Restaurants Private Limited
- mgX Delivery
- MyShipment.Com
- OBHAI Solutions
- Radio Foorti
- Transmarine Logistics
- Galileo Bangladesh Limited, represents Travelport in Bangladesh.
- Waadaa
- Peyala Café
- Jatra Rooms
- Eastern Bank Ltd.
