= Sadia Islam Mou =

Bangladeshi model and actress

- সাদিয়া ইসলাম মৌ
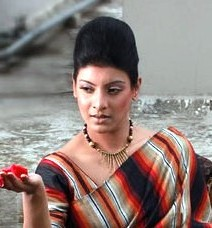
- Born: 21 June 1976 (age 50); Dhaka, Bangladesh
- Occupations: Model, actress, dancer
- Years active: 1989 – present
- Spouse: Zahid Hasan (1997–Present)
- Children: 2

Sadia Islam Mou (born 21 June 1976) is a Bangladeshi model and television actress. She became popular during the 1990s by appearing in television advertisements.

== Career ==
Mou debuted into modeling in 1989 through the television advertisement on Mount Shampoo. She started acting through the television drama Obhimane Onubhobe in 1994. She was a judge in lux superstar 2018. She got immense popularity since mid 90s.

== Personal life ==
Mou married Zahid Hasan in 1997. Together they have a daughter, Puspita Hasan and a son, Purno Hasan.
