= List of Bangladeshi films of 2018 =

This article lists feature-length films and full-length documentaries that were at least partly produced by the Bangladeshi film industry and were released in Bangladesh in 2018. Short films and made-for-TV films are not included. Films are ordered by domestic public release date, excluding film festivals, theatrical releases abroad, and sneak previews or screenings.

Inspector Notty K, starring Jeet and Nusrat Fariha, started out as an Indo-Bangla joint production by Jeetz Filmworks and Jaaz Multimedia. Late in shooting, the rules for joint productions changed. Rather than delay the release until a required preview committee was formed, the producers released it as an Indian film, which Jazz Multimedia then imported to Bangladesh. It was released in India on 19 January 2018. Originally intended to release simultaneously in Bangladesh, it was delayed there by one week to 26 January.

== Releases ==
=== January–March ===
Opening		Title	Director	Starring	Notes	Ref.
J A N	5	Demag	Mukul Netrabadi	Tanin Subha, Ripon Gazi		
J A N	5	Putro	Saiful Islam Mannu	Ferdous Ahmed, Jaya Ahsan		
J A N	12	Haimanti	Dial Rahman	Tithi Basu, Sakal Raj		
J A N	12	Pagol Manush	MM Sarkar	Shabnur, Shayer Khan		
F E B	9	Bhalo Theko	Jakir Hossain Raju	Arifin Shuvo, Tanha Tasnia		
F E B	16	Ami Neta Hobo	Uttam Akash	Shakib Khan, Bidya Sinha Mim		
F E B	16	Noor Jahaan	Abhimanyu Mukherjee, Abdul Aziz	Puja Cherry Roy, Adrit Roy		
M A R C H	2	Ranga Mon	Zakir Khan	Nirab, Sylvie		
M A R C H	23	Matir Projar Deshe	Imtiaz Ahmed Bijon	Jayanta Chattopadhyay, Rokeya Prachy, Mahmudur Aninda, Sheuli Aktar		
M A R C H	23	Pashan	Saikat Nasir	Bidya Sinha Mim, Om Sahani		
M A R C H	30	Bizli	Iftakar Chowdhury	Bobby, Ranveer	Limited release at Janata Cinema Hall, Nilphamari, wide release on 13 April	
M A R C H	30	Kaler Putul	Reza Ghalib	Ferdous Ahmed, Raisul Islam Asad		

=== April–June ===
Opening		Title	Director	Starring	Notes	Ref.
A P R I L	6	Poloke Poloke Tomake Chai	Shahnawaz Shanu	Bappy Chowdhury, Mahiya Mahi		
A P R I L	6	Swapnajaal	Giasuddin Selim	Pori Moni, Yash Rohan		
A P R I L	13	Ekti Cinemar Golpo	Alamgir	Alamgir, Arifin Shuvo, Rituparna Sengupta		
A P R I L	20	Alta Banu	Arun Chowdhury	Zakia Bari Mamo, Farzana Rikta		
A P R I L	20	Premer Keno Phansi	Abu Sufiyan	Saif Khan, Raka Biswas		
M A Y	4	Dhusar Kuasha	Uttam Akash	Munna, Nipun, Puspita Popy		
J U N E	16	Chittagainga Powa Noakhailla Maiya	Uttam Akash	Shakib Khan, Shobnom Bubly		
J U N E	16	Komola Rocket	Nur Imran Mithu	Mosharraf Karim, Tauquir Ahmed		
J U N E	16	Panku Jamai	Abdul Mannan	Shakib Khan, Apu Biswas		
J U N E	16	PoraMon 2	Raihan Rafi	Siam Ahmed, Puja Cherry Roy		
J U N E	16	Super Hero	Ashiqur Rahman	Shakib Khan, Shobnom Bubly		

=== July–September ===
Opening		Title	Director	Starring	Notes	Ref.
J U L	6	Namata	Golam Mustafa Shimul	Bithi Rani Sarkar, Nafiza Chowdhury, Momena Chowdhury		
J U L	6	Premik Chele	Mukul Netrabadi	Adnan Adi, Labanya		
J U L	20	Bengali Beauty	Rahsaan Noor	Rahsaan Noor, Mumtaheena Toya	Released in the US on 14 February 2018	
A U G	22	Ahoto Phooler Golpo	Anto Azad	Tahia Tazon Khan, Shujon Mahbub. Gazi Rakayet	Released outside the system of commercial cinema halls, first in Debiganj	
A U G	22	Captain Khan	Wajed Ali Sumon	Shakib Khan, Shabnom Bubly		
A U G	22	Jannat	Mostafizur Rahman Manik	Symon Sadik, Mahiya Mahi		
A U G	22	Mone Rekho	Wajed Ali Sumon	Mahiya Mahi, Bonny Sengupta		
S E P	14	Fifty Fifty Love	Mukul Netrabadi	Shahriaz, Orin		

=== October–December ===
Opening		Title	Director	Starring	Notes	Ref.
O C T	5	Pobitro Bhalobasha	AK Sohel	Mahiya Mahi, Rokun Uddin		
O C T	12	Megh Kanya	Minhajul Islam	Ferdous Ahmed, Nijhum Rubina		
O C T	19	Debi	Anam Biswas	Chanchal Chowdhury, Jaya Ahsan		
O C T	19	Nayok	Ispahani Arif Jahan	Bappy Chowdhury, Adhora Khan		
O C T	19	Sanatan Golpo	Masum Aziz	Masum Aziz, Sabiha Zaman, Uts Zaman		
O C T	26	Matal	Shahin-Sumon	Symon Sadik, Adhora khan, Shipon Mitra		
N O V	2	Asmani	M Shakhawat Hossain	Bappy Chowdhury, Shusmi Rahman		
N O V	16	Hasina: A Daughter's Tale	Piplu Khan			
N O V	16	Leader	Dilshadul Haque Shimul	Moushumi, Ferdous Ahmed, Omar Sani		
N O V	16	Mr. Bangladesh	Abu Akhter Ul Iman	Shanarei Devi Shanu, Khijir Hayat Khan		
N O V	30	Dahan	Raihan Rafi	Siam Ahmed, Puja Cherry		
N O V	30	Pathshala	Asif Islam	Habib Arinda, Ima Akter Kotha		
D E C	14	Postmaster 71	Abir Khan, Rashed Shamim	Ferdous Ahmed, Moushumi		
D E C	14	Tui Shudhu Amar	Joydeep Mukherjee, Ananya Mamun	Om Sahani, Mahiya Mahi, Soham Chakraborty		
D E C	21	Arpita	Shahriar Nazim Joy	Golam Farida Chhanda		
D E C	21	Shopner Ghor	Taneem Rahman Angshu	Anisur Rahman Milon, Shimul Khan, Quazi Nawshaba Ahmed		

== See also ==
- 2018 in Bangladesh
