= Chikon Ali =

Bangladeshi actor

- Born: Md Shaminur Rahman; Badalgachhi, Naogaon, Rajshahi, Bangladesh
- Other name: Shamim Khan
- Occupations: Actor; Comedian
- Years active: 2006–present
- Organizations: C A Comedy TV; C A Drama TV; C A Film TV
- Known for: Film actor and comedian
- Notable work: Mone Prane Acho Tumi; Bhalobashlei Ghor Bandha Jay Na; Love Marriage; Shooter; Bossgiri; Beporowa
- Style: Comedy
- Spouse: Khushi Biswas
- Children: 2
- Parents: Abbas Ali (father); Sajeda Begum (mother)

Md Shaminur Rahman, popularly known as his stage name Chikon Ali is a Bangladeshi film actor. He contested the 12th National Parliament election as an independent candidate from the Naogaon-3 (Badalgachhi-Mahadebpur) constituency. He was born in Badalgachi Upazila of Naogaon district. He is married to model Khushi Biswas. He usually plays comedic roles in films. He made his film debut in 2006 with the film M. B. Manik's Rangin Chasma, produced by Enayet Karim.

He is the current executive member of the Bangladesh Film Artistes Association, the organisation of local film artists.

== Career ==
Chikon made her film debut in 2006 with the film Rangin Chasma, directed by Enayet Karim. Then in 2008, he got a chance to act in the film Mone Prane Acho Tumi directed by Jakir Hossain Raju, where he played the role of Shakib Khan's friend. He gained popularity and acclaim for his performance in this film. After that, he acted in several popular films including "Tor Karone Beche Achi", "Bhalobaslei Ghor Bandha Jay Na", "Ek Takar Denmohor", "Love Marriage", and "Hitman".

== Participation in the 2024 Bangladeshi general election ==
Chikon Ali submitted his nomination papers as an independent candidate for the Naogaon-3 (Badalgachhi-Mahadebpur) constituency to participate in the 12th National Parliament election. The returning officer rejected Chikon Ali's nomination due to discrepancies in the election affidavit and errors found in the voter list during the investigation. Chikon Ali also wants to appeal the cancellation of his nomination. He later appealed and regained his candidacy by order of the High Court. He contested the election with the symbol "kettle" and was defeated in the election.

== Works ==
- Anondo Osru (2026)
- Maya: The Love (2024)
- Lipstick (2024)
- Kill Him (2023)
- Bubujaan (2023)
- Shoshurbari Zindabad 2 (2022)
- Poramon 2 (2018)
- Pashan (2018)
- Beporowa (2018)
- Mone Rekho (2018)
- Jannat (2018)
- Ohongkar (2017)
- Apon Manush (2017)
- Tui Amar (2017)
- Dhat Teri Ki (2017)
- Premi O Premi (2017)
- Antor Jala (2017)
- Shooter (2016)
- Bossgiri (2016)
- Full Length Love Story 2 (2016)
- Black Money (2015)
- Love Marriage (2015)
- Warning (2015)
- Tui Shudhu Amar (2014)
- Khobh (2014)
- Toamr Kache Rini (2014)
- Bhalobasa Express (2014)
- Hitman (2014)
- Romeo 2013 (2013)
- Inchi Inchi Prem (2013)
- Banglar Paglu (2013)
- Ji Hujur (2012)
- Bajarer Kuli (2012)
- Pagla Hawa (2012)
- Ek Takar Denmohor (2012)
- Moner Ghore Bosot Kore (2011)
- Champa Ranir Akhra (2011)
- Tor Kaone Beche Achi (2011)
- Ostro Charo Kolom Dhor (2011)
- Baap Boro Na Shoshur Boro (2010)
- Bostir Chele Kotipoti (2010)
- Bhalobaslei Ghor Bandha Jay Na (2010)
- Amar Praner Priya (2009)
- Bolbo Kotha Basor Ghore (2009)
- Mone Prane Acho Tumi (2008)
- Rangin Chasma (2004)
