= Bangladesh Film Artistes Association =

Organization of Bangladeshi film artists

- Formation: 1984
- Type: Artists Association
- Legal status: Private organization
- Headquarters: Dhaka, Bangladesh
- Location: BFDC
- President: Shiba Shanu
- General Secretary: Joy Chowdhury

The Bangladesh Film Artistes Association (Bengali: বাংলাদেশ চলচ্চিত্র শিল্পী সমিতি) is an organization of Bangladeshi film artists. It carries out various activities for the benefit of film artists of Bangladesh. Shiba Shanu is the current president of the organization, and Joy Chowdhury is the general secretary.

== History ==
In 1952, an organization named the East Bengal Film Association (Purbobongo Cholocchitro Shomiti) was established in Dhaka. Over time, this organization gradually evolved and eventually became known as the Bangladesh Film Artistes' Association. The association formally began its journey under this new identity in 1984. Its official office is currently located at the Bangladesh Film Development Corporation (BFDC) premises in Dhaka.

== Committee ==
Shiba Shanu was elected as the new president of Bangladesh Film Artistes Association for the term 2026–2028, and Joy Chowdhury was elected as the general secretary.

Title	Name
President	Shiba Shanu
Vice President	D. A. Tayeb
Vice President	Ilias Kobra
General Secretary	Joy Chowdhury
Deputy General Secretary	Subrata
Organizing Secretary	Sony Rahman
Office and Publicity Secretary	Jacky Alamgir
International Affairs Secretary	Parvez Chowdhury Abir
Culture and Sports Secretary	Maruf Akib
Treasurer	Kamruzzaman Komol
Executive member	Ali Raj
Executive member	Kabila
Executive member	Kayes Arju
Executive member	Jesmin Akter
Executive member	Nasrin
Executive member	Farhad
Executive member	Shipan Mitra
Executive member	Raka
Executive member	Chikon Ali
Executive member	Shirin Shila
Executive member	Sushanta

== Former leaders ==
President	General Secretary	Term
Razzak	Ahmed Sharif	11/05/1984 to 11/08/1984
Khalil Ullah Khan	Ahmed Sharif	11/08/1984 to 03/07/1987
Khalil Ullah Khan	Ahmed Sharif	03/07/1987 to 18/08/1989
Ahmed Sharif	Ilias Kanchan	18/08/1989 to 30/08/1991
Ahmed Sharif	Mahmud Koli	30/08/1991 to 19/09/1993
Alamgir	Mahbub Khan Gui	19/09/1993 to 13/10/1995
Ahmed Sharif	Mahmud Koli	13/10/1995 to 14/12/1997
Mahmud Koli	Mizu Ahmed	14/12/1997 to 09/12/1999
Mahmud Koli	Mizu Ahmed	09/12/1999 to 05/05/2002
Ahmed Sharif	Dipjol	05/05/2002 to 22/12/2004
Mizu Ahmed	Manna	22/12/2004 to 10/12/2009
Mizu Ahmed	Rubel	10/12/2009 to 25/05/2011
Shakib Khan	Misha Sawdagor	25/05/2011 to 06/02/2015
Shakib Khan	Amit Hasan	06/02/2015 to 25/05/2017
Misha Sawdagor	Zayed Khan	25/05/2017 to 26/10/2019
Misha Sawdagor	Zayed Khan	26/10/2019 to 29/01/2022
Ilias Kanchan	Nipun	29/01/2022 to 19/04/2024
Misha Sawdagor	Dipjol	2024–2026
Shiba Shanu	Joy Chowdhury	2026–present

== Controversy ==
During the vote counting for the 2017–18 term elections of the Bangladesh Film Artistes' Association in 2017, notable Bangladeshi actor Shakib Khan was attacked at BFDC. On 8 May 2017, Khan filed a complaint at Tejgaon Industrial Police Station, accusing several individuals, including actors Symon Sadik and Zayed Khan. The officer-in-charge of Tejgaon Industrial Police Station, Abdur Rashid, confirmed to bdnews24.com that Shakib Khan had filed the complaint.

== See also ==
- Bangladesh Film Directors Association
- Bangladesh Film Producers and Distributors Association
