= Iftekhar Rafsan =

Bangladeshi youtuber, model and actor

- ইফতেখার রাফসান
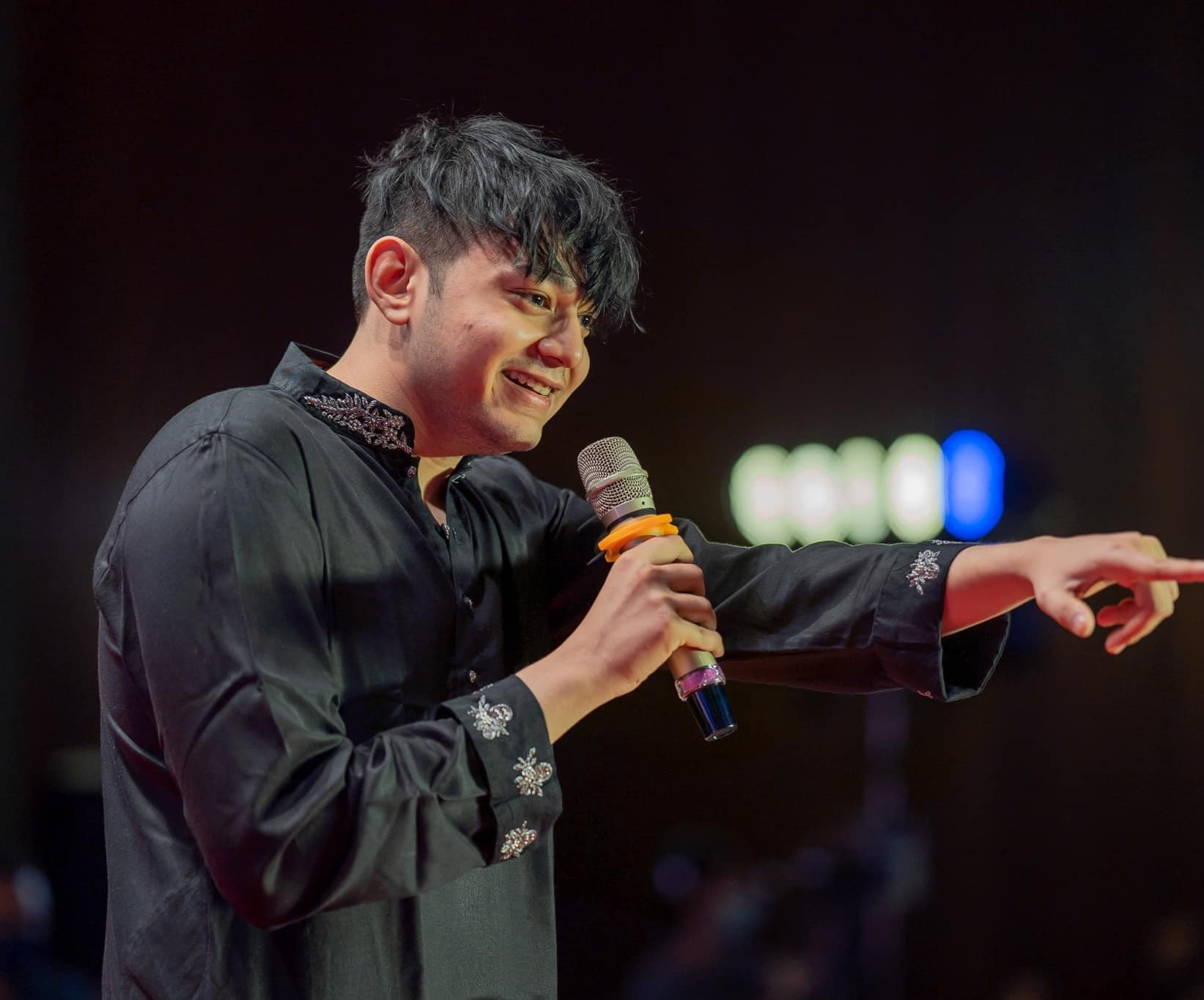
- Rafsan in 2022
- Born: 6 July 1997 (age 29); Dhaka, Bangladesh

YouTube information
- Channel: RafsanTheChotobhai
- Years active: 2017–present
- Genres: Food blogging; vlog
- Subscribers: 3.41 million
- Views: 584.5 million
- Last updated: 24 April 2026

Iftekhar Rafsan (Bengali: ইফতেখার রাফসান; Bengali pronunciation: [i̯ pʰ t æ kʰ r]RAF-san; born 6 August 1997), known online as RafsanTheChotobhai, is a Bangladeshi YouTuber, media personality, businessmen and model, best known for his food vlogging. He started creating content for YouTube in 2017, and as of April 2026, has more than 3.41 million subscribers.

== Early life and education ==
Rafsan was born and grew up in Dhaka, Bangladesh. He studied Computer Science and Media and Communications at Independent University, Bangladesh.

== Career ==
Rafsan created his YouTube channel in 2014, and started creating content from 2017. He mostly posts videos of food reviews and also engaged in brand promotion, travel vlogging, modelling, and television dramas.

In 2020, Rafsan collaborated with Will Sonbuchner of the YouTube channel Best Ever Food Review Show. In 2022, Rafsan hosted Emirati content creator Khalid Al-Ameri during his visit to Bangladesh, including at an iftar held at Rafsan’s home.

In 2021, Rafsan made his television acting debut in the Eid-ul-Adha drama The Teacher, aired on NTV, directed by Mabrur Rashid Bannah, and produced by Underground Creative Factory, in which he portrayed the role of a student opposite Abdun Noor Shajal. Prior to his acting work, he appeared in television and online commercials, stating in interviews that he participated in approximately 30 to 40 such productions.

Rafsan ventured into electrolyte beverage business in 2023 with the brand name "BLU".

In June 2024, the food inspector of the Dhaka South City Corporation filed a case in the Pure Food Court of Dhaka against Rafsan, accusing him for the production of electrolyte drinks under the brand name "BLU" without certification from Bangladesh Standards and Testing Institution or Directorate General of Drug Administration. A warrant was issued for his arrest; however, he was granted anticipatory bail and fined ৳1.6 million by the court. The case was subsequently closed following the payment of the fine. Following the controversy and legal action by the government, he relaunched the brand in 2026 with a modified formulation of the flavored drink, obtaining certification from BSTI.

In September-October 2025, Rafsan hosted Pakistani actress Hania Aamir at his home in Dhaka, where she appeared in a vlog featuring Bangladeshi home-cooked food prepared by his mother. During her visit to Bangladesh for promotional events, Rafsan also accompanied her to multiple locations across the country, documenting local cuisine, culture, and experiences; the vlog gained significant online attention and positive reactions from audiences in both Bangladesh and Pakistan.

In February 2026, Rafsan travelled to Pakistan and collaborated with local creators, including Mubashir Saddique, and explored rural settings while documenting traditional hospitality and large-scale village-style cooking. In the vlog, he presented Pakistani cuisine as rich and meat-oriented, and compared it with Bangladeshi food by noting similarities in spices and flavors alongside differences in cooking methods, scale, and serving practices.

== Personal life ==
In June 2024, Rafsan gifted his parents a luxury Audi car reportedly worth around BDT 20 million, which drew widespread attention on social media. Several media outlets alleged that his parents had an outstanding bank loan exceeding BDT 30 millions and the issue quickly became widely discussed online. Rafsan later addressed the matter in a video, where he denied claims about the car’s reported price. He stated that the loan case was still under legal procedure, and his family would be able to repay the loans once the exact amount is confirmed by the bank.

== Recognition ==
In February 2024, he received the "Best Content Creator award" in the food and recipe category at the second edition of the Blender's Choice–The Daily Star OTT and Digital Content Awards.

== See also ==
- List of YouTubers
