= Shipan Mitra =

Bangladeshi actor

- শিপন মিত্র
- Born: 25 November; Bangladesh
- Occupations: Actor; model; producer
- Years active: 2014–present
- Organization: Black Pepper Production

Shipan Mitra (Note: Also spelt as Shipon Mitra) (born 25 November) is a Bangladeshi actor, producer, and model who works predominantly in Dhallywood cinema, Bangladeshi television drama, and music videos. He made his acting debut playing the lead character in Desha: The Leader (2014). (Note: multiple sources:) He is the current executive member of the Bangladesh Film Artistes Association, the organisation of local film artists.

He has since played notable roles in productions such as Big Brother (2015), Dhaka Attack (2017), and Matal (2018).

== Early life ==
Mitra was born on 25 November.

== Career ==
Mitra began his career with acting and producing Imran Mahmudul's music video "Aradhana" in 2012. He also produced commercials for several famous brands, including Robi and Apex Group. He has also produced more music videos under his own production company, 'Black Pepper Production', including Porshi's "Boro Eka" from the 'Porshi 2' album (2012) and "Chokher Poloke" from the Prothom Shpno album (2012), sung by Shubhmita and Rizvi Wahid, and Imran Mahmudul's "Manena Mon" from the 'Tumi' album (2014). He made his debut in the film Desha: The Leader (2014), directed by Saikat Nasir, which was a success.

In 2022, Mitra appeared in the Jao Pakhi Bolo Tare, directed by Mostafizur Rahman Manik.

== Filmography ==
Key
†	Denotes films that have not yet been released

Year	Title	Role	Notes	Ref.
2014	Desha: The Leader	Selim / Desha	Debut film	
2015	Nill Foring	Shuvoo		
2015	Big Brother	Rana		
2015	U-Turn	Selim		
2017	Chol Palai	Raj		
2017	Dhaka Attack	AC Rahat	Special appearance	
2018	Matal	Shipan		
2019	Bhalobashar Rajkonna	Abul Hossain		
2021	Tepantorer Math Periye	Shafiq	Released on Channel i	
2022	Bosonto Bikel	Rudro		
2022	Jao Pakhi Bolo Tare	Romel		
2026	Borisailla Pori	Samraat		
TBA	Operation Jackpot †	TBA	Filming	
TBA	Dena Pawna †	TBA	Filming; based on Rabindranath Tagore's short story Dena Pawna	
TBA	Voboghure †	TBA	Post-production	

=== Music video ===
Year	Title	Singer	Notes	Ref.
2012	"Aradhona"	Imran Mahmudul	As Casting and producer	
2012	"Boro Eka"	Sabrina Porshi	Only as producer	
2012	"Chokher Poloke"	Shubhmita and Rizvi Wahid	Only as producer	
2014	"Manena Mon"	Imran Mahmudul	Only as producer	

== Television ==
Year	Title	Role	Notes	Ref.
2023	Mar Ghuriye		Series on Deepto TV	
2025	Cinemar Manush	Actor Raja	Series on ATN Bangla	
