= Lemis =

Bangladeshi playback singer

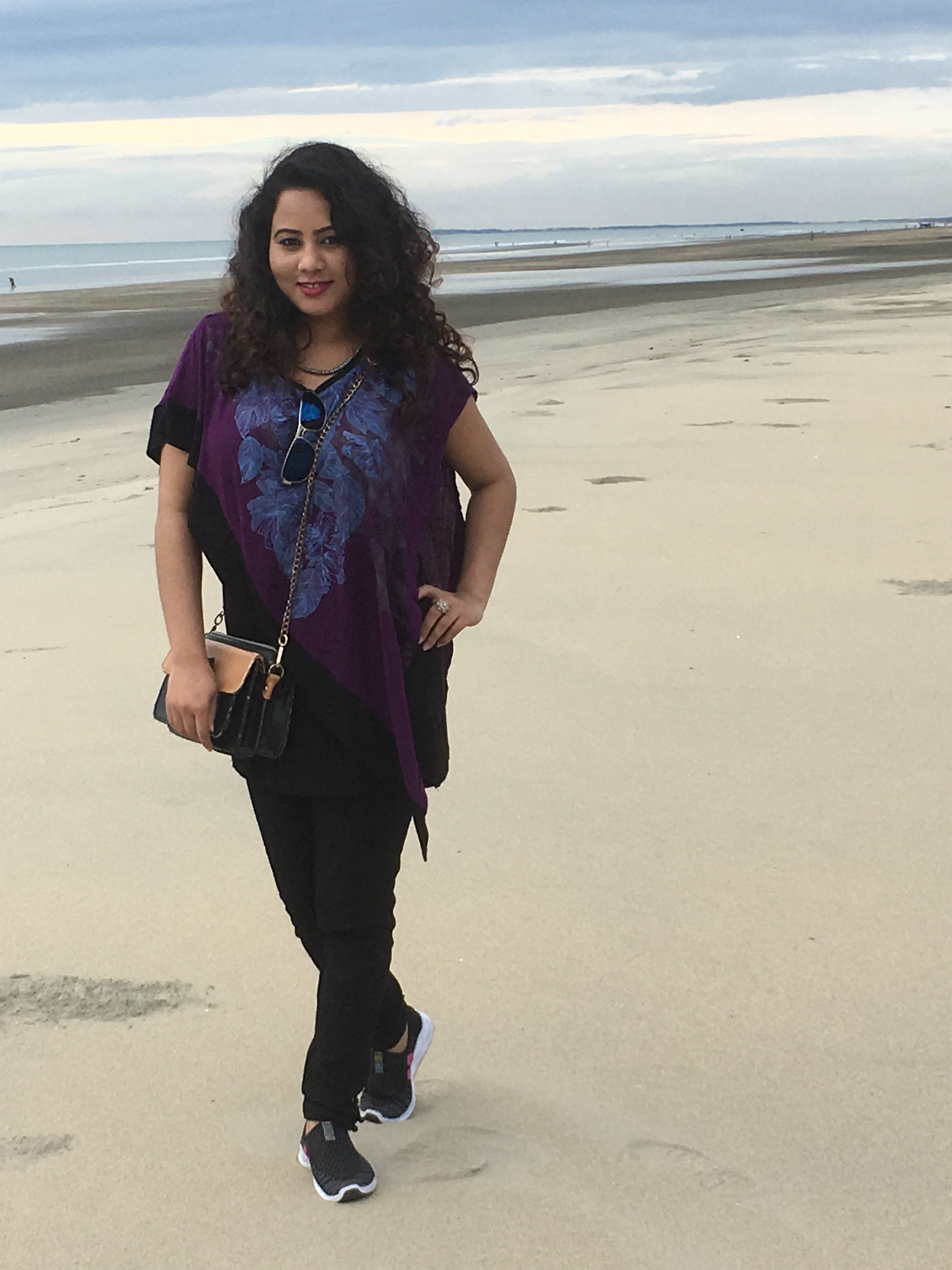
Lemis in January 2018

Lemis (also known as Lihat Lemis) is a Bangladeshi playback singer. Born on 5 December 1991 in Mymensingh, Bangladesh, she was in films such as Agnee, Aaro Bhalobashbo Tomay, Agnee 2, Niyoti, Premi O Premi and Nagar Mastan. She also got the best singer (BATCHAS) award 2014 for the song Agnee. Her exposure to the movie industry led her to work with other prominent musicians, such as Bollywood playback singer Nakash Aziz and composer Savvy Gupta.

== Career ==
Lemis' introduction to the world of television began when she competed in Notun Kuri, a Bangladeshi reality TV show on BTV. After her debut, she was featured in an episode of Ityadi. Her first major career success was singing the title track of the 2014 film Agnee for Mahiya Mahi. The popularity of this song led to her receiving the nickname "Agni Kanya," which means The Girl of Fire. Lemis also sang "Preme Porechi," a popular rock song composed by the composer Kazi Nowrin. The song also appeared in a mixed album. On 14 April 2016 she released her first solo album, composed by Shafiq Tuhin, which had three original songs. She also appears in the films Maa and Target (item song featuring Naila Nayem). In 2018, she released "Ki Je Koro Moyna", a duet with Asif Akbar in the film Ratrir Jatri.

== Filmography ==
- Agnee (2014)
- Aaro Bhalobashbo Tomay (2015)
- Nagar Mastan (2015)
- Maa (2015)
- Target (2015)
- Antoranga (2015)
- Bhalobasha Express (2015)
- Ajob Prem (2015)
- Jotil Prem (2015)
- Dobir Shaheber Shongshar (2015)
- Agnee 2 (2016)
- Niyoti (2016)
- Ostitto (2016)
- Ratrir Jatri (2018)
- Bijli (2018)
- Pashan (2018)
- Moner Moto Manush Pailam Na (2019)
- Target 4 (upcoming)
