= Asif Imrose =

Bangladeshi actor and model

- আসিফ ইমরোজ
- Born: Khulna, Bangladesh
- Occupations: Actor; model; businessman
- Years active: 2014–2023
- Notable work: Dobir Saheber Songsar; Bhalo Theko
- Spouse: Rafsana Afrin Prottasha (m. 2021)
- Children: 1 (son)

Asif Imrose (Bengali: আসিফ ইমরোজ) is a Bangladeshi former actor and model who worked in Bangladeshi television drama and Dhallywood cinema. He was made his debut with the film Dobir Saheber Songsar (2014).

== Early life ==
Imrose born in Khulna, Bangladesh, he is the younger of two children of Md. Sohrab Uddin and Anjuman Ara. He pursued his education in commerce, studying for a Bachelor of Commerce (B.Com) degree.

== Career ==
Imrose came in to the media participating in the reality show Super Hero Super Heroine. The reality show was held in 2009, jointly organized by Bangladesh Film Development Corporation and satellite television channel NTV. In that competition, he achieved the distinction of being the 1st Runner up. In 2014, he made his acting debut in the film Dobir Saheber Songsar.

=== Retirement ===
In February 2026, during an interview with Khoborer Kagoj, Imrose announced his retirement from the film industry. He revealed that he took this decision following the birth of his child in 2023, stating that he is currently focusing on his family, child, and business endeavors. Imrose added that he is now devoting his life to practicing Islam and has no intention of returning to acting. (Note: the video clip of the interview:)

== Personal life ==
On 28 May 2021, Imrose married Rafsana Afrin Prottasha in a private ceremony held at her residence in Duttapara, Tongi. Prottasha works as the Head of Accounts at a private organization. On June 11, 2023, Imrose became a father to a son.

== Filmography ==
Key
| † | Denotes films that have not yet been released |

| Year | Film | Role | Notes | Ref. |
|---|---|---|---|---|
| 2014 | Dobir Saheber Songsar | Akkas | Debut film | |
| 2018 | Bhalo Theko | Rose Mirza | | |
| 2021 | Tumi Acho Tumi Nei | Amit / Sneho | | |
| 2023 | Mon Diyechi Tare | Pakhi Majhi | | |
| TBA | Maya Nagor † | TBA | Unreleased | |
| TBA | Kacha Lanka † | TBA | Unreleased | |
| TBA | Moyna Pakhir Shangshar † | TBA | Unreleased | |

=== Television ===
| Year | Title | Role | Notes | Ref. |
|---|---|---|---|---|
| 2018 | Nayantara | Nayon | Released on Ekushey Television | |
| 2018 | Akhashe Megher Vela | Akash | Released on Global TV | |
| 2018–2020 | Jaygir Master | Doctor | Drama serial on Banglavision | |

=== Music video ===
| Year | Title | Singer | Director | Ref. |
|---|---|---|---|---|
| 2017 | "Agun" | Asif Akbar | Saikat Nasir | |
| 2018 | "Chocolatey Piya" | Kazi Shuvo & Kornia | Samsul Huda | |
| 2018 | "Sundori" | Akkash Sen & Eti | Samsul Huda | |
| 2019 | "Bayna Mon" | R Joy & Nusrat | Osman Miraz | |
| 2019 | "Angul Chute Chai" | Fahim Faisal | Sajib | |
| 2021 | "Bonomali" | Sathi Khan | Ruhan Belal | |
