= Runout =

A runout may include any of the following:

- Runout (climbing), a section of a rock climbing route with a long gap between points of protection
- Run-out, an inaccuracy of rotating mechanical systems, specifically when a tool or shaft does not rotate exactly in line with the main axis.
- Run out, a method of dismissal in the sport of cricket.
- Refusals and runouts, in equestrian sport, an attempt to evade an obstacle.
- Run Out (film), 2012 Film
