= Nagar Mastan =

Bangladeshi film

- Movie poster
- Directed by: Rakibul Islam Rakib
- Produced by: Shafikul Islam
- Starring: Pori Moni; Zayed Khan; Misha Sawdagar; Titan Chowdhury
- Music by: Emon Saha
- Distributed by: R S Films
- Release date: 23 October 2015 (location)
- Country: Bangladesh
- Language: Bengali

Nagar Mastan (Bengali: নগর মাস্তান) is a 2015 Bangladeshi film directed by Rakibul Islam Rakib and starring Pori Moni, Zayed Khan and Shahriaz. The supporting cast includes Misha Saudagar, Ali Raj, and Titan Chowdhury, for whom it was a debut film. The film was criticised for vulgar scenes and it was locked by censor board two times and edited many times, until a third time it was released by the censor board.

== Cast ==
- Pori Moni as Pori
- Zayed Khan as Police ACP Zayed
- Shahriaz as Shahriaz
- Rafsan Jane as Rafsan
- Titan Chowdhury as Titan
- Mizu Ahmed
- Rakib Khan
- Jamal Patwari
- Sagor

== Music ==
The film's music was composed by Emon Saha.

Track No	Title	Singer(s)
1	"O Pori Moni"	Lehat Lemis
2	"Bhalobasha Hoye Gele"	Baby Nazneen
3	"Chandra Bole Surjo Bole"	Nodi
4	"Ektai Jibon Ekbari Moron"	Andrew Kishore and Konok Chapa

== Release ==
The film was released on 23 October 2015 in Bangladesh. According to Bangladesh-India joint venture pact, the film was released in 2017 in Kolkata, India whereas Haripada Bandwala (2016) was released in Bangladesh.
