= Joy Chowdhury =

Bangladeshi film actor

- জয় চৌধুরী
- Born: Joy Chowdhury; July 15, 1988 (age 38); Magura District, Bangladesh
- Education: University of Development Alternative, Asian University of Bangladesh
- Occupation: Film actor
- Years active: 2012–present

Joy Chowdhury is a Bangladeshi film actor. He started his career in 2012 with the film Ek Joban. He is best known for Hitman, Chini Bibi, Ajob Prem and Antor Jala. He is the current general secretary of the Bangladesh Film Artistes Association.

== Early life ==
Joy Chowdhury was born in Magura District, Bangladesh. He is the son of Oliul Islam and Rowshonara Islam. He married Kazi Romana Islam on December 4, 2013. They have one child, Son Raad Shamat Chowdhury (Born 2022). He spent his early days in Magura with his parents. His father, who died on 5 January 2007, was a businessman. Joy Chowdhury completed his bachelor's degree in UODA (BBA) & post graduation in Asian University (MBA).He is a Bangladeshi actor, film producer, entrepreneur, and Businessman. He made his film debut with the commercially successful Ak Joban (2012).

== Career ==
Joy debuted with the film Ek Joban, which was directed by F.I Manik in 2012. His second film was Hitman (2014), which was directed by Wazed Ali Sumon. Later he appeared in several films, including Valobashle Dosh Ki Tate (2014), Khoniker Valobasha (2015), Chini Bibi (2015), Ajob Prem (2015), and Antor Jala (2017).

== Filmography ==
Key
†	Denotes films that have not yet been released

Year	Title	Role	Note	Ref.
2012	Ek Joban	Akash	Debut film	
2014	Bhalobashle Dosh Ki Tate	Joy		
2014	Hitman	Shuvo		
2014	Khoniker Bhalobasha	Joy		
2015	Chini Bibi	Manik		
2015	Ajob Prem	Ratul		
2017	Antor Jala	Dulal		
2022	Kaktarua	Shahosh	Released on Hold	
2023	Prem Pritir Bandhon	Prem		
2024	Trap – The Untold Story	Rafi		
2024	Ahare Jibon	Rayhan		
2024	Omanush Holo Manush	Bijoy		
2025	Amar Shesh Kotha	Surjo		
2026	Sneher Bandhan			
2026	Anondo Osru		Cameo appearance	
TBA	Ayna †	Rustom		
TBA	Valobashi Koto Bojhabo Kemne †	TBA		
TBA	Ek Poshla Bristi †	TBA		
