= Mousumi Nag =

Bangladeshi model and actress

Mousomi Nag
- মৌসুমী নাগ
- Other names: Mousomi Biswas
- Occupations: Actress, model
- Notable work: Run Out
- Spouse(s): Mithu Bishwas (divorced), Shoeb Islam (m. 2013)
- Children: 3

Mousumi Nag is a Bangladeshi model and actress. She made her media debut in the television drama Shure Akaa Chobi in 2006, which was a commercial success. Since then, she has acted in 150 dramas and is now one of the most popular names in the Bangladeshi TV drama industry. She has also appeared in films.

== Career ==
Nag became most famous after playing a role in the film Run Out. In this movie, she co-starred with another famous TV celebrity, Shajal Noor. The film was a success at the box office. She then acted in several Dhallywood films, including Feel My Love and many others.

== Personal life ==
Mousumi married Mithu Biswas in 2000 and changed her name to Mousumi Biswas. The couple has a son, Prithibi Biswas. Mousumi divorced Mithu and married Soeb Islam on 29 August 2013. This couple also has a son (aged 10). On 10 March 2024, she gave birth to a daughter.

== Filmography ==
- Run Out
- Prarthona
- Fill My Love
- Full HD
