= Bangladesh Film Producers and Distributors Association =

Trade association

- Formation: 1997
- Headquarters: Dhaka, Bangladesh
- Region served: Bangladesh
- Official language: Bengali

Bangladesh Film Producers and Distributors Association is a trade body of film producers and distributors in Bangladesh that lobby for the film industry. Khourshed Alam Khosru is the President of the Bangladesh Film Producers and Distributors Association.

== History ==
Bangladesh Film Producers and Distributors Association was formed with the merger of two organizations, Bangladesh Film Producers' Association and Bangladesh Film Distributors' Association. The Bangladesh Film Producers' Association was founded in 1972 by Khan Ataur Rahman, soon after the Independence of Bangladesh. The Bangladesh Film Distributors' Association was established in 1975–76. In 1997, the organizations merged to form the Bangladesh Film Producers Distributors Association. In 2020, representatives of Bangladesh Film Producers and Distributors Association, Bangladesh Film Directors Association, and Bangladesh Film Exhibitor Association sat down with Dr Hasan Mahmud, the Minister of Information, to find ways reviving the film industry and stop cinema halls from closing.
