= Niyoti =

- Theatrical poster
- Directed by: Jakir Hossain Raju
- Written by: Abdullah Zahir Babu
- Produced by: Abdul Aziz; Ashok Dhanuka (co-producer)
- Starring: Arifin Shuvoo; Falguni Rahman Jolly
- Cinematography: Saiful Shaheen
- Edited by: Touhid Hossain Chowdhury; Somnath Dey
- Music by: Ahmed Imtiaz Bulbul; Savvy Gupta
- Production companies: Jaaz Multimedia; Eskay Movies
- Distributed by: Jaaz Multimedia; Eskay Movies
- Release dates: 10 June 2016 (India); 12 August 2016 (Bangladesh)
- Countries: Bangladesh; India
- Language: Bengali

Niyoti is a 2016 Indo-Bangladesh joint production romantic thriller film written by Abdullah Zahir Babu and directed by Jakir Hossain Raju. Produced by Abdul Aziz under the Jaaz Multimedia banner, the film stars Arifin Shuvoo and Falguni Rahman Jolly in pivotal roles. The film is also co-produced by Ashok Dhanuka under the banner of Indian production house Eskay Movies. The film is set in two different periods of time. Shuvoo plays an arrogant millionaire entrepreneur and strict by nature, who eventually falls in love with a girl who possesses a totally opposite personality, played by Jolly. The film centers around the struggle Shuvo faces to cure the love of his life, Jolly, who has dementia, a long-term memory loss. Niyoti was released in India on 10 June 2016 and Bangladesh in August 2016.

== Synopsis ==
At a modern-day, an elderly man begins to narrate a romantic story to an old woman. The story he begins telling is about an arrogant young businessman who falls in love with a charming short tempered girl. Respectively, He belongs to the elite class, and she is to middle class. The two lovers later get married and settle to their new happy life. Their fate eventually betrays them as she gets diagnosed with dementia, and starts forgetting all their memories day by day. Dejected after witnessing their son's fate, the parents buy a large estate in a very rural and peaceful place away from the city and settle them there.

In the present, it is revealed that the elderly man is narrating their love story to his wife, who is suffering from dementia. He is her husband, but she does not recognize him, nor remember any of the events he is reading to her.

== Cast ==
- Arifin Shuvoo as Shuvro Chowdhury
- Falguni Rahman Jolly as Mila Sarkar
- Ishani Ghosh
- Rebeka Rouf as Mila's Mother
- Moushumi Saha as Shuvro's Mother
- Supriyo Dutta as Anik Sarkar, Mila's Father
- Nader Chowdhury as Doctor
- Arman Parvez Murad as Vicky
- Jacky Alamgir as New Tenant

== Production ==
=== Development ===
The film was first announced in April 2015, when Jaaz Multimedia signed three films agreement with Falguni Rahman Jolly, the lead actress of the film. The script was finalised later that year, with Arifin Shuvo as the leading male actor of the film. The story-line of the film was scripted after inspiration from 2004's American romantic film The Notebook, as the makers stated the film to be an inspiration from The Notebook, but not a remake. The film was shot on a 42-day schedule. The two filming locations are Dhaka, and Hyderabad. The music sequences were filmed at Ramoji Film City. The last phase of the film was filmed at Sylhet.

=== Casting ===
In October 2015, principal photography of the film started. The first schedule of the film was shot in Ashulia, Dhaka during early November 2015. Arefin Shuvo was roped to play the lead role in the film. It was also reported that Nusraat Faria was to play the opposite role, However, Jolly was later selected as the main female lead.

=== Inspiration ===
The story was inspired by Nicholas Sparks's romantic novel The Notebook, but Hossain wanted to make the film with a South Asian flavor, which resulted the writer to change the story line slightly.

=== Release ===
Niyoti was scheduled to release worldwide on 8 April 2016 on over 200 screens worldwide. However, the release was postponed due to extensive post production work. The release date in India was later scheduled for 10 June 2016 while the official release is scheduled for 24 June 2016. The film released in 83 screens in West Bengal, India at 10 June 2016. Eskay Movies was given the distribution rights of the film in India while the production company Jaaz Multimedia will distribute the film in Bangladesh. The film is also scheduled to release in Malaysia, and Australia beginning 2017.

== Soundtrack ==
The official soundtrack album was unveiled on 26 February 2016, with release of the first single titled "Dhakai Sharee". The music was composed by Savvy Gupta and sung by Lihat Lemis. The track was extensively shot at Ramoji Film City in Hyderabad. The second track was officially released on 6 May 2016, titled "Joton Kore". The romantic genre track was sung by legendary musician Runa Laila.

Niyoti

Soundtrack album by Savvy Gupta
- Released: 26 May 2016
- Genre: Feature film soundtrack
- Length: 23:00
- Language: Bengali
- Labels: Jaaz Music; Eskay Music
- Producers: Abdul Aziz; Ashok Dhanuka

Savvy Gupta chronology
Hero 420 (2016)	Niyoti (2016)	Samraat: The King Is Here (2016)

Singles from Niyoti: Original Motion Picture Soundtrack
- 1. "Dhakai Sharee" Released: 26 February 2016; 2. "Mon Haralo" Released: 26 May 2016; 3. "Onek Sadhonar Pore" Released: 6 June 2016

Track Listing:

Niyoti: Original Motion Picture Soundtrack
No.	Title	Lyrics	Music	Singer(s)	Length
1.	"Dhakai Sharee"	Savvy Gupta	Savvy Gupta	Savvy Gupta & Lihat Lemis	4:00
2.	"Joton Kore"	Priyo Chatterjee	Savvy Gupta	Runa Laila	4:00
3.	"Toke Chara"	Priyo Chatterjee	Savvy Gupta	Mohammed Irfan	2:40
4.	"Mon Haralo"	Priyo Chatterjee	Savvy Gupta	Shaan & Nazmun Munira Nancy	4:40
5.	"Hai Allah"	Goutam Sushmit	Savvy Gupta	Dilshad Nahar Kona	3:20
6.	"Onek Sadhonar Pore" (Originally composed by Ahmed Imtiaz Bulbul)	Ahmed Imtiaz Bulbul	Savvy Gupta	Imran Mahmudul & Nazmun Munira Nancy	4:20
Total length:					23:00

=== Soundtrack review ===
The first track of the album "Dhakai Sharee" was released as single on 26 February 2016. The track was released by Jaaz Multimedia on its social media platforms. The track was written and composed by Savvy Gupta. Dhakai Sharee was categorized as a dance track. The track was well received by audiences and critics with over two million hits on YouTube. The second track "Joton Kore" was released on 6 May 2016. Lyrics of the song was penned by Priyo Chatterjee and composed by Savvy Gupta. The track was sung by Runa Laila. "Toke Chara" was released on 19 May 2016. The track was sung by Mohammed Irfan.The fourth track of the album, "Mon Haralo" was released on 26 May 2016, and received an overwhelming response upon its release. The track received 100K hits on YouTube during the first two days of its release. The track was sung by Shaan, and Nazmun Munira Nancy. The fifth track of the album is titled "Hai Allah" and was sung by Dilshad Nahar Kona. It is categorized as a dance track. The sixth soundtrack of the album "Onek Sadhonar Pore" is a recreation of 1998 film Bhalobashi Tomake track with the same title. The track is recreated by Savvy and sung by Imran Mahmudul.

== Reception ==
The film received critical acclaim, with critics praising the screenplay and performances which is the most positive aspect of the film. The film also received positive feedback for its soundtrack album and performances of the lead cast. Numerous media outlets reported the success of the film on its opening day in India. An official statement was released by production company Jaaz Multimedia, confirming the validity of the media reports. According to Jaaz Multimedia, the film did well in West Bengal.
