= Shooter (2016 film) =

- Directed by: Raju Chowdhury
- Screenplay by: Abdullah Zahir Babu
- Story by: Delwar Hossain Dil
- Produced by: Mohammad Iqbal
- Starring: Shakib Khan; Shabnom Bubly; Khalid Hossain Samraat; Shahriaz; Misha Sawdagor; Manoshi Sarkar; Jinnat Tithi Kabir; Sania Zaman Zara
- Cinematography: Mohiuddin Monir
- Edited by: Touhid Hossain Chowdhury
- Music by: Javed Ahmed Kislu
- Production company: Sunan Movies
- Distributed by: Sunan Movies
- Release date: September 13, 2016
- Running time: 144 minutes
- Country: Bangladesh
- Language: Bengali

Shooter is a 2016 Bangladeshi action-drama film. The film was directed by Raju Chowdhury and produced by Mohammad Iqbal under the banner of Sunan Movies. The film's story was written by Delwar Hossain Dil and screenplay and dialogue by Abdullah Zahir Babu. The film stars Shakib Khan and Shabnom Bubly in lead roles and Khalid Hossain Samraat, Shahriaz, Misha Sawdagor, Manoshi Sarkar, Saniya Zaman Zara and Jinat Kabir Tithi also played supporting roles in the film. The film was released on September 13, 2016.

== Cast ==
- Shakib Khan as Surja / Shooter Surjo
- Shabnom Bubly as Labonno
- Khalid Hossain Samraat as Rumel
- Misha Sawdagor as Shark
- Alvin Jannat Jahid as Lady Dragon
- Chikon Ali as Burger Ali
- Shahriaz as Viki
- Habib Khan
- Nana Shah as Dragon
- Sania Zaman Zara as Tania
- Jinat Kabir Tithi
- Nipa Ahmed Realy as Nila

== Soundtrack ==
Shooter

Soundtrack album by Javed Ahmed Kislu
- Released: 2016
- Recorded: 2015
- Genre: Feature Film Soundtrack
- Language: Bengali
- Label: Live Technologies
- Producer: Javed Ahmed Kislu

The soundtrack album of the film was composed by Javed Ahmed Kislu and lyrics by Sudip Kumar Dip.

Track list
No.	Title	Singer(s)	Length
1.	"Ki Kore Toke Bolbo"	Imran Mahmudul, Sabrina Porshi	4:13
2.	"Kate Naa Din"	S I Tutul, Dilshad Nahar Kona	3:50
3.	"Shooter" (title track)	Sajal	1:43
4.	"Babuji"	Arif, Jui	3:24

== Release ==
The film was released in 152 theatres on September 13, 2016, on the occasion of Eid al-Fitr.
