= Tamij Uddin Rizvi =

Bangladeshi film director (died 2022)

Tamiz Uddin Rizvi
- Born: 14 August 1947
- Died: 25 April 2022 (aged 75)
- Occupations: Film director and producer

Tamiz Uddin Rizvi (died 25 April 2022) was a Bangladeshi freedom fighter (deputy commander Mujib Bahini) and film director and producer. He directed many films.

== Biography ==
Rizvi took part in the Liberation War of Bangladesh. He was the director of Ashirbad. Anju Ghosh made her career debut with that film. This film is selected for preservation in Bangladesh Film Archive.

Rizvi was the director of Asha Valobasa too. In this film Misha Sawdagar acted in negative role for the first time in his career. This film is also selected for preservation in the Bangladesh Film Archive.

Besides these films Rizvi also directed films like Ashirbad, Chhoto Ma, Jeler Meye, Jiddi, Birodh, Tumi Amar, Asha Valobash and Jobabdihi. These films are selected for preservation in Bangladesh Film Archive too. His last direction Jobabdihi was released in 1999.

== Selected filmography ==
- Ashirbad
- Choto Maa
- Jeler Meye
- Jiddi
- Birodh
- Tumi Amar
- Asha Valobasa
- Jobabdihi
