= Adhora Khan =

Bangladeshi film actress and model

Adhora Khan অধরা খান
- Occupations: Actress, model

Adhora Khan is a Bangladeshi film actress and model. She made her film debut with the film Nayok (2018) directed by Ispahani Arif Jahan.

== Career ==
Adhora made her film debut in Nayok, released on October 19, 2018. Her co-star of the film was Bappy Chowdhury.

In 2018, her second film, Matal, was released, co-starring Symon Sadik. In 2021, she appeared in the film Pagoler Moto Bhalobashi (2021) which was directed by Shaheen Sumon. In 2023, she appeared in the film Sultanpur (2023) directed by Saikat Nasir which also released in Hindi language.

== Filmography ==
Key
†	Denotes films that have not yet been released

Year	Film	Role	Notes	Ref.
2018	Nayok	Ontu	Debut film	
2018	Matal	Parisha		
2021	Pagoler Moto Bhalobashi	Adhora		
2023	Sultanpur	Samia Rahman		
2026	Ritukamini †	Ritukamini	Post-production	
2026	Dukhin Duar †	TBA	Post-production	
2026	Violence †	TBA	Filming	
