= Mohammed Rahmatullah (academic) =

Bangladeshi academic and scientist

- মোহাম্মদ রহমতুল্লাহ

Vice-Chancellor of University of Development Alternative
- Incumbent
- Assumed office 16 November 2020
- Preceded by: Rafiqul Islam Sharif

Personal details
- Born: 1951
- Died: October 11, 2023
- Education: Ph.D (Biochemistry)
- Alma mater: University of Dhaka
- Known for: Plant metabolites as Antivirals

Mohammed Rahmatullah (1951-2023) was an academic and scientist. He was the vice chancellor of the University of Development Alternative (UODA).
