= Zayed Khan (Bangladeshi actor) =

Bangladeshi film actor

- জায়েদ খান
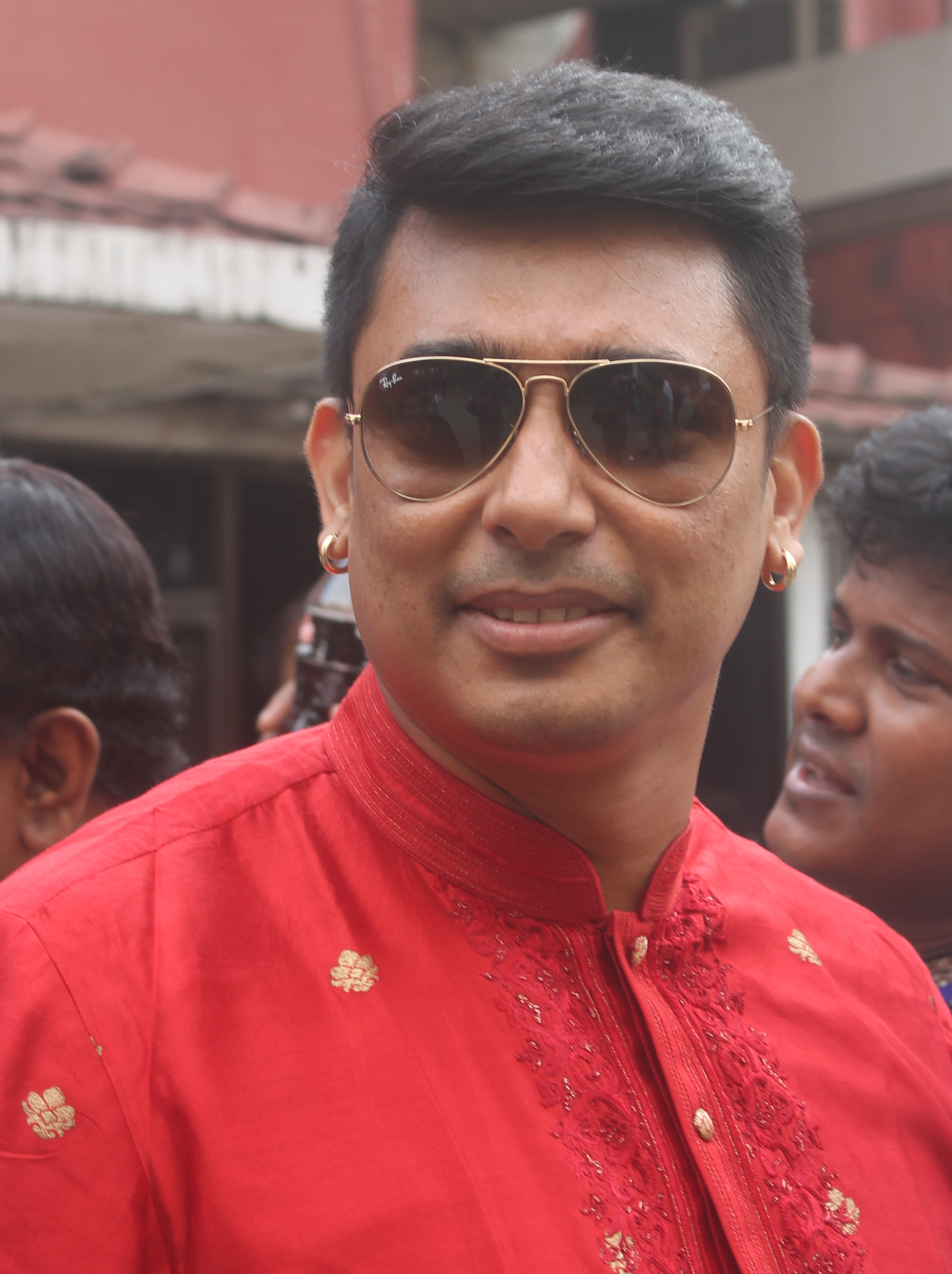
- Khan in 2018
- Born: Zahirul Haque; Pirojpur, Bangladesh
- Education: Dhaka City College; University of Dhaka
- Occupations: Actor, film producer, television presenter
- Years active: 2007–present
- Website: zayedkhan.net

Zahirul Haque, (Note: RTV gives his name as Zahirul Haque Monu.) known professionally as Zayed Khan, is a Bangladeshi film actor and television presenter. He made his film debut in Bhalobasha Bhalobasha (2007) and appeared in films including Atto Gopon (2012), Nagar Mastan (2015) and Antor Jala (2017), which he also produced. He played Tikka Khan in Shyam Benegal's Mujib: The Making of a Nation (2023).

Khan was general secretary of the Bangladesh Film Artistes' Association from 2017 to 2022. He was a member of the Bangladesh Awami League's central cultural affairs subcommittee. He later moved to the United States, where he has presented a programme for the New York-based Bengali outlet Thikana and acted in short films.

== Early life and education ==
Khan was born on 30 July in Pirojpur, where he grew up. He is the youngest of three brothers and a sister. His mother, Shahida Haque, died in December 2021. The singer Khalid Hasan Milu was his paternal uncle, and Milu's sons, the singers Protic Hasan and Pritom Hasan, are his cousins.

After passing the Secondary School Certificate examination, Khan moved to Dhaka in 1995 and enrolled at Dhaka City College. He later studied history at the University of Dhaka, where he completed a master's degree.

== Career ==
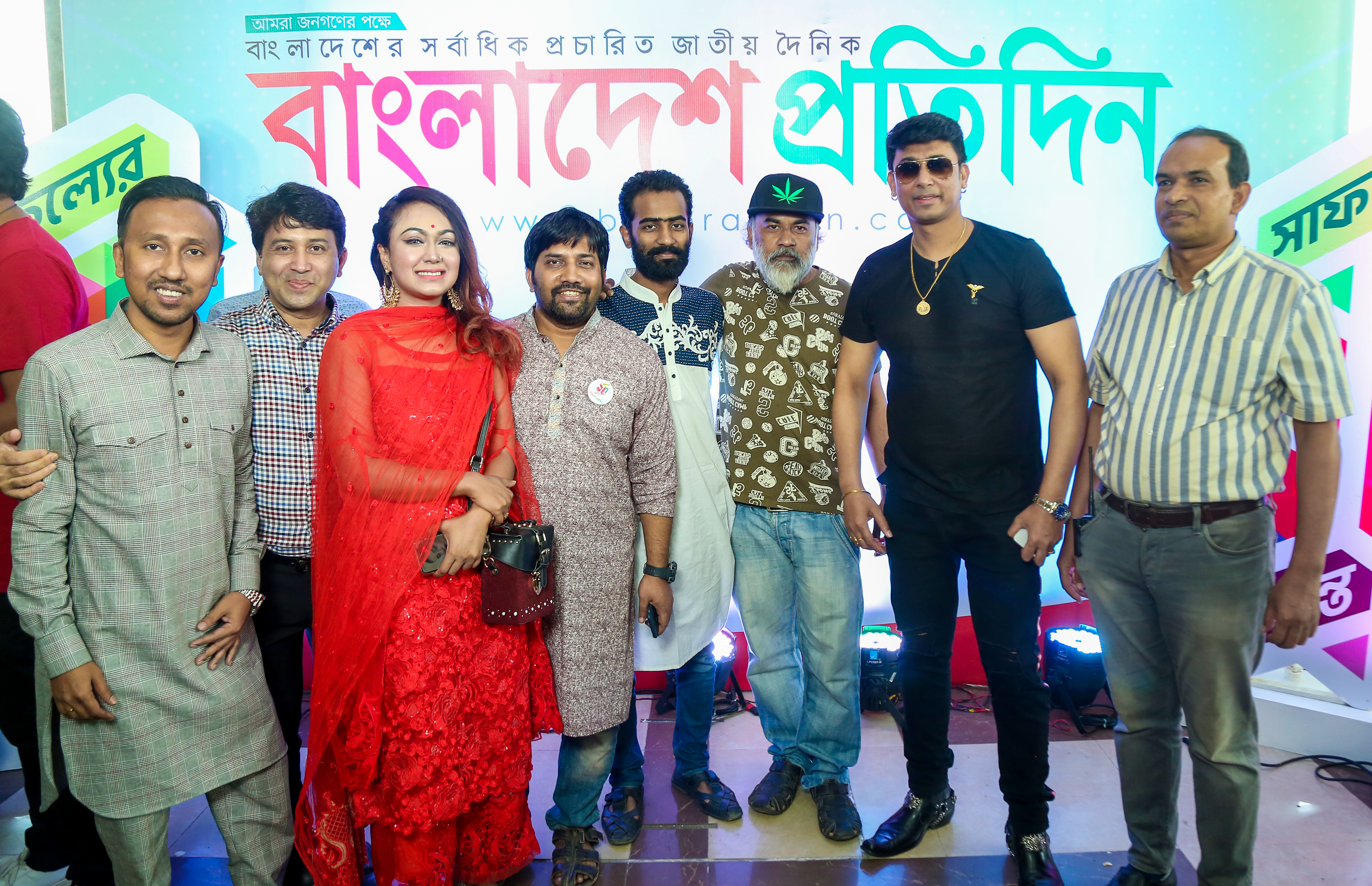
Khan with other media figures at the tenth anniversary celebration of Bangladesh Pratidin

=== Film ===
While a student, Khan took part in Notun Mukher Sondhane, a talent contest held at the Bangladesh Film Development Corporation. He was cast in his first film, Bhalobasha Bhalobasha, by a producer from Pirojpur; it was directed by Mohammad Hannan and starred Riaz and Shabnur. The film was released in 2007, (Note: RTV dated the release to 2008. Prothom Alo reported in 2025 that he had been working in films since 2006.) by which time he had signed for Jomidar Barir Meye and Paap Er Prayaschitta.

He appeared in Kajer Manush and Mon Chuyeche Mon in 2009, and in Amar Swapno Amar Songshar, Mayer Chokh and Rickshawalar Chele in 2010. He played the male lead opposite Shabnur in M. M. Sarkar's Atto Gopon (2012). Five of his films were released in 2014, including Prem Korbo Tomar Sathe, Dabang and Toke Bhalobashtei Hobe. His 2015 releases were Bhalobasha Shimahin and Nagar Mastan, in which he was paired with Pori Moni.

Khan produced Antor Jala (2017), his first film as producer, directed by Malek Afsary and co-starring Pori Moni. That year he also appeared opposite Nipun in the television film Light Camera Action.

In November 2021 he was cast as the Pakistani general Tikka Khan in Mujib: The Making of a Nation, Shyam Benegal's Bangladesh–India biopic of Sheikh Mujibur Rahman. His look for the role was released in September 2023. Sonar Char, in which he appeared with Moushumi and Omar Sani, was released at Eid al-Fitr in April 2024.

=== Work in North America ===
In a 2026 interview, Khan said he had lived in the United States for the previous two years. In December 2024 he began presenting an entertainment programme for Thikana, a New York-based Bengali media outlet; it was his first work as a host.

He has acted in Immigrant Diaries, a Thikana series of short films about Bangladeshi immigrants in New York. The first instalment, American Dream, directed by Jon Kabir, was released in March 2026. In the second, Eid Mubarak, directed by Kabir and Saad Al Amin and released on 26 May 2026, he appeared with Zohran Mamdani. By October 2026 he was filming Violence in Canada, directed by Kamal Hossain Babor, in which he plays a Canadian police officer opposite Shirin Shila.

=== Bangladesh Film Artistes' Association ===
Khan was elected general secretary of the Bangladesh Film Artistes' Association in May 2017 on a panel led by Misha Sawdagar, receiving 279 votes to 145 for Amit Hasan. He was re-elected in October 2019 with 284 votes. (Note: New Age reported 71 votes for the runner-up, Ilias Kobra; Prothom Alo reported 68.) In December 2020 the commerce ministry dissolved the committee of the Bangladesh Film Producers Distributors Association after an investigation upheld Khan's complaint, made as general secretary, that the committee had been elected through a rigged vote. Nipun Akter held the post for the 2022–2024 term.

== Politics ==
In December 2020, Khan was appointed to the Awami League's central cultural affairs subcommittee for the 2019–2021 term. He said in March 2022 that he had been active in Bangladesh Chhatra League politics as a student and wanted to contest a parliamentary election as an Awami League candidate.

== Filmography ==
=== Film ===
Key
†	Denotes films that have not yet been released

Year	Title	Role	Notes	Ref.
2007	Bhalobasha Bhalobasha		Debut film	
2008	Jomidar Barir Meye			
2009	Kajer Manush			
2009	Mon Chuyeche Mon			
2009	Paap Er Prayaschitta			
2010	Amar Swapno Amar Songshar			
2010	Mayer Chokh			
2010	Rickshawalar Chele			
2010	Nag Naginir Shopno			
2011	Goriber Bhai			
2011	Amar Prithibi Tumi			
2011	Bangla Bhai			
2012	Atto Gopon		Lead role	
2014	Odrishyo Shotru			
2014	Prem Korbo Tomar Sathe			
2014	Dabang			
2014	My Name Is Simi			
2014	Toke Bhalobashtei Hobe			
2015	Bhalobasha Shimahin			
2015	Nagar Mastan			
2017	Antor Jala		Also producer	
2023	Mujib: The Making of a Nation	Tikka Khan		
2024	Lipstick	Himself	Special appearance	
2024	Sonar Char			
2026	Violence †	Canadian police officer	Filming	
TBA	Bahaduri †			
TBA	Khoto †			

=== Television and web ===
Year	Title	Notes	Ref.
2017	Light Camera Action	Television film	
2024	Untitled entertainment programme	Presenter; Thikana	
2026	Immigrant Diaries: American Dream	Short film; Thikana	
2026	Immigrant Diaries: Eid Mubarak	Short film; Thikana	
