= Sudipto Saeed Khan =

Bangladeshi journalist

- Occupation: journalist

Sudipto Saeed Khan is a Bangladeshi journalist and story writer. He won Bangladesh National Film Award for Best Story for his story of the film Jannat (2018). and he also write story for romantic drama film Anondo Osru (2026)

== Career ==
Khan started writing in 1995. His first poetry book was published in 2006. His 2nd book was published in 2016. He is currently working as a sub-editor of a daily newspaper named Desh Rupantar.
