= Dobir Saheber Songsar =

2014 film by Jakir Hossain Raju

- Directed by: Jakir Hossain Raju
- Written by: A J Babu
- Produced by: Shish Monwar
- Starring: Mahiya Mahi; Bappy Chowdhury; Asif Imrose; Ali Raj; Alexander Bo
- Edited by: Tawhid Hossain Chowdhury
- Production company: Jaaz Multimedia
- Distributed by: Jaaz Multimedia
- Release date: 4 April 2014
- Country: Bangladesh
- Language: Bengali

Dobir Saheber Songsar (Bengali: দবির সাহেবের সংসার) is a Bangladeshi Bengali-language romantic comedy film directed by Jakir Hossain Raju. Bappy Chowdhury, Mahiya Mahi and Asif Imrose played the lead roles. The film co-star Ali Raj, Alexander Bo and many more. It was released on 4 April 2014. Shakib Khan played a cameo role in this film.

== Plot ==
This film is about Mr. Dobir, (Ali Raj) who has lost his second Daughter (Mahiya Mahi) in her childhood. Meanwhile, he appointed two servants Kuddus (Bappy Chowdhury) and Akkas (Asif Imrose).

== Cast ==
- Mahiya Mahi as Mr. Dobir's Daughter
- Bappy Chowdhury as Kuddus
- Asif Imrose as Akkas
- Ali Raj as Gulzar
- Rebeka Rouf
- Alexander Bo
- Shakib Khan as Cameo Appearance

== See also ==
- Amar Praner Priya
