= Pure Jay Mon =

2016 Bangladeshi film

- Movie poster
- Directed by: Apurba-Rana
- Screenplay by: Dilwar Hossain Dil
- Story by: Dilwar Hossain Dil
- Produced by: Sharif Chowdhury
- Starring: Symon Sadik; Pori Moni; Ali Raj; Mizu Ahmed
- Cinematography: Kamrul Ahmed Panir
- Edited by: Touhid Hossain Chowdhury
- Music by: Masum Babul; Habib
- Production company: Sony Movies International
- Distributed by: Live Tech
- Release date: 19 January 2016
- Country: Bangladesh
- Language: Bengali
- Box office: ৳4.5 lakh (US$3,700) (in 1 day)

Pure Jay Mon is a 2016 Bangladeshi romantic drama film. Produced by Sharif Chowdhury under the banner of Sony Movies International and directed by duo director Apurba-Rana. It stars Symon Sadik and Pori Moni in the lead roles, with Ali Raj, Mizu Ahmed, Rebecca, and others in supporting roles. Although Symon and Pori Moni previously worked together in a film titled Rana Plaza, this is the first film released by the duo. Ali Raj won the 41st National Film Awards for Best Supporting Actor for his performance in the film.

== Cast ==
- Symon Sadik as Surjo
- Pori Moni as Kajol
- Ali Raj
- Mizu Ahmed
- Sharif Chowdhury
- Ima
- Shakil
- Toma
- Rebecca
- Mahmudul Hasan Mithu
- Dulari
- Boby
- Jacky Alamgir
- CB Jaman
- Chikon Ali

== Production ==
The film received censor clearance on 29 November 2015.

== Music ==
The music of the film was composed by Javed Ahmed, Ahmed Humayu,n and RumSen.n. The lyrics were written by Gazi Mazharul Anwar, Sudip Kumar Dwip, and Bahauddin Rimon. The songs were sung by Parvez, Imran Mahmudul, Sabrina Porshi, Karnia, Rama, Pulak, Dithi Anwar, Kheya, and Ahmed Humayun. Four songs from the film - "Pure Jay Mon", "Ore Priyare", "Second Hand Girlfriend", "Hazar Rokam Prem" - were released on YouTube on 22 December 2015.

== Release and reception ==
=== Release ===
The film Pure Jay Mon was originally scheduled for release on 5 January 2016, but was later released in 86 theatres in Bangladesh on 29 January 2016. The film was also released in Kolkata in January 2018 under the South Asian Free Trade Agreement (SAFTA).

=== Reception ===
The film received mixed reviews from critics, Jago News 24 wrote, "The film was a commercial success, after the release of several films in the new year, they have fallen flat. However, the success of 'Pure Jay Mon' in this depressed market has sounded a hope for the film industry in the new year". Amar Bikrampur wrote "Like the film PoraMon, this film was also made, but this film could not even come close to the superhit film PoraMon".

== Award ==
Award	Category	Awardee	Result	Ref.
Bangladesh National Film Award for Best Supporting Actor	Best supporting actor	Ali Raj	Won	
