= Anondo Osru (2026 film) =

2026 Bangladeshi film

- Poster
- Directed by: Mostafizur Rahman Manik
- Screenplay by: Asad Zaman
- Story by: Sudipto Saeed Khan
- Produced by: Symon Sadik; Al Amin; Md Jaman Mia
- Starring: Symon Sadik; Mahiya Mahi; Shahiduzzaman Selim; Ali Raj
- Cinematography: Ismail Hossain Liton
- Edited by: Shohidul Haque
- Music by: Emon Saha; Arfin Rumey; JK Majlish
- Production company: SS Productions
- Distributed by: The Abhi Kathachitra
- Release date: 13 November 2026
- Country: Bangladesh
- Language: Bengali

Anondo Osru (Bengali: আনন্দ অশ্রু) is a 2026 Bangladeshi romantic drama film directed by Mostafizur Rahman Manik and produced by Symon Sadik under the banner of SS International, it's first produced film of Symon Sadik. The film features Symon Sadik, Mahiya Mahi, Joy Chowdhury, Shahiduzzaman Selim, Ali Raj and others.

== Cast ==
- Symon Sadik as Farhad
- Mahiya Mahi as Shirin
- Ali Raj
- Shahiduzzaman Selim as Amjad Ahmed Khan
- Joy Chowdhury
- Maruf Aqib
- Chikon Ali
- Sujata
- Nasreen

== Music ==
The shooting for two songs from the movie is taking place. The music directors for the songs are Emon Saha and Sahriar Rafat.

== Production ==
A film with the same title, Anondo Osru, was released in 1997. Mostafizur Rahman Manik's film has nothing in common with the earlier one except the title. The new film has an original story written by Sudipto Saeed Khan.

The shooting of Ananda Ashru began on February 3, 2018. The last phase of the shooting was held at a location at Nikli Upazila in Kishoreganj on January 6, 2020. After 11 months, the shooting of the film has ended by taking shoot for the "Moner Duar Khole" song scene in Nikli Upazila.

== Release ==
The film was supposed to be released on 15 January 2020, but was delayed due to the COVID-19 pandemic.

The film is scheduled to be released in theatres on November 13, 2026 distributed by The Abhi Kathachitra. Its released on 13 November 2026 on 38 cinema halls.
