= Mabrur Rashid Bannah =

Bangladeshi television director, screenwriter and actor

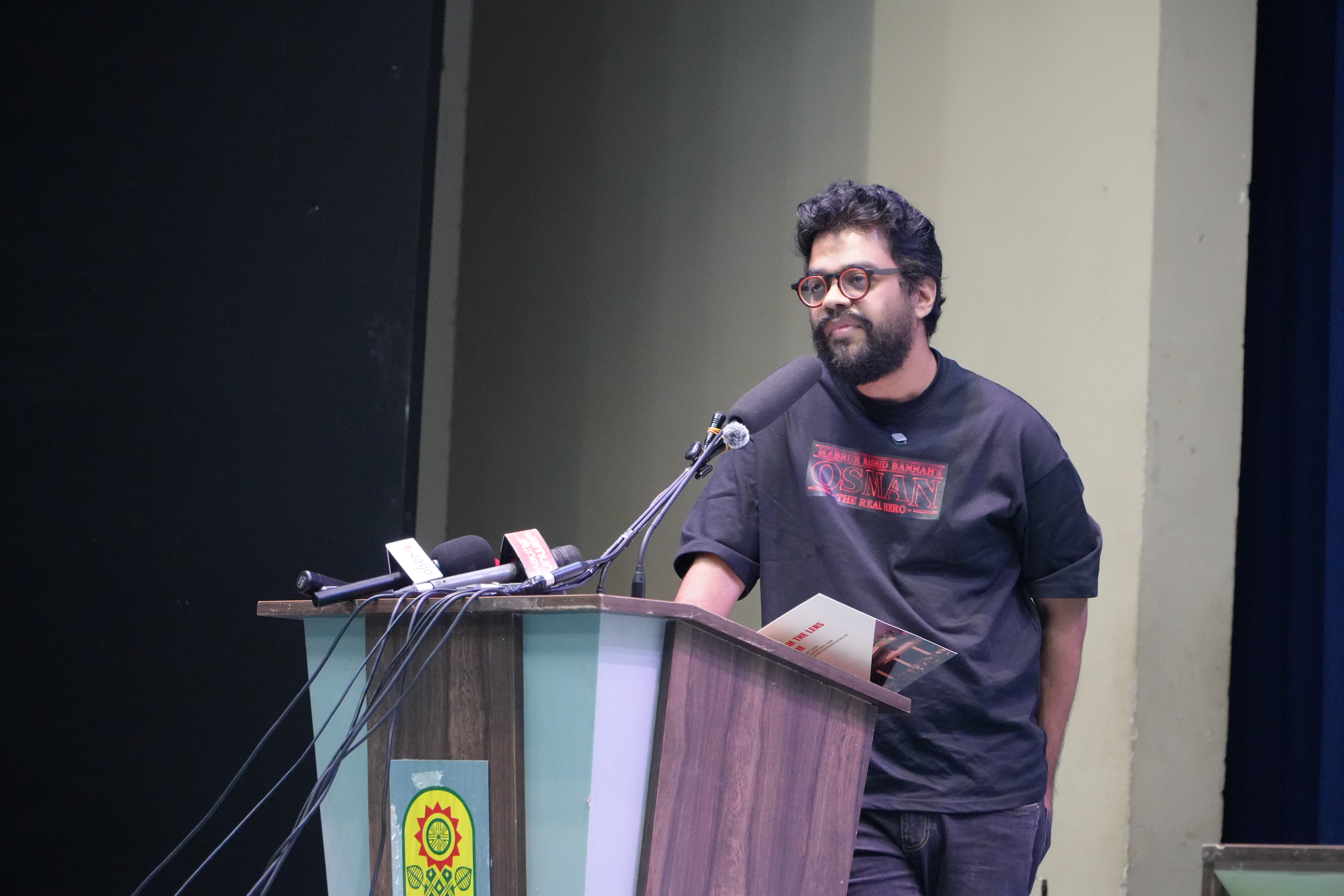
- Bannah speaking at a workshop organised by Revolution's Watch at Bangla Academy
- Born: 23 October 1988 (age 38); Dhaka, Bangladesh
- Education: University of Development Alternative
- Occupations: Television and OTT director, screenwriter, actor
- Years active: 2011–present
- Notable work: Nasta (2025); Lunch (2025)
- Spouse: Saniya Afrin

Mabrur Rashid Bannah (born 23 October 1988) is a Bangladeshi television and OTT director, screenwriter, and actor. He made his directorial debut in 2011 and has since directed more than 300 television dramas, serials, telefilms and short films.

Initially recognised for directing romantic and family-oriented television dramas, Bannah later attracted attention for works inspired by the July Revolution, political repression and contemporary social issues.

== Early life and education ==
Mabrur Rashid Bannah was born in Dhaka, Bangladesh. He is the eldest of three siblings. Around 2009, he began his creative career as a photographer before contributing photographs to the Bengali daily Samakal.

He graduated from the Department of Communication and Media Studies at the University of Development Alternative (UODA).

== Career ==
Bannah worked as an assistant director under television director Iftekhar Ahmed Fahmi for three years, where he gained practical experience in television production. His directorial debut came in December 2011 with the telefilm Flashback, which premiered on NTV. The production starred veteran actors Ali Zaker and Abul Hayat.

In 2015, Desh TV aired his television serial Nine & a Half, written by Tuhin Russell. The series follows the lives of a group of university students.

His Eid al-Adha television drama Mayer Dak, produced by Akbar Haider Munna and released in 2021, received significant audience attention and accumulated several million views on YouTube.

In October 2020, his short film Amar Oporadh Ki? and Madboy–Relaunched, in which he appeared as an actor under the direction of Touhid Ashraf, were released on Amazon Prime Video.

=== Political fiction and later work ===
Following the July Revolution, Bannah's work increasingly focused on political and social themes. In early 2025, he directed the political fiction Nasta, followed by the web film Lunch. According to contemporary media coverage, both productions drew inspiration from allegations of political repression during the previous government's tenure and the reported existence of the detention facility known as Aynaghar.

The productions portray the experiences of ordinary people during periods of political unrest and include fictional narratives inspired by events associated with the July Revolution.

In May 2026, Bannah wrote, directed and produced the television drama Helmet Bahini, based on the July movement, and also appeared in the production as an actor.

In August 2024, he announced plans to produce a feature film inspired by the deaths of Abu Sayed and Abrar Fahad. In October 2024, Samakal reported that the project remained in development.

== Selected works ==
- Flashback (2011)
- Nine & a Half (2015)
- Ashroy (2019)
- Mayer Dak (2021)
- Sweeper Man (2021)
- Nasta (2025)
- Lunch (2025)
- Helmet Bahini (2026)

== Awards and recognition ==
Bannah's productions Ashroy, Sweeper Man, and Mayer Dak received a combined total of 28 awards in various categories at the Nexgen International Film Festival and the Paradox International Film Festival.

== Personal life ==
Bannah is married to Saniya Afrin, the Finance Director of Underground Creative Factory (UCF). During the COVID-19 lockdown in 2020, she worked as the cinematographer for Bannah's web series Bhai Brothas.His mother died in October 2023.

== Threats ==
In May 2026, following the release of the political fiction drama Helmet Bahini, Bannah stated on social media that he had been receiving repeated death threats.

At around the same time, Daily Amar Desh reported allegations that Arshad Adnan, the son of then-President Mohammed Shahabuddin, had threatened Bannah over his involvement in the July movement. The allegation received coverage in Bangladeshi media.
