= Hitman (2014 film) =

Bangladeshi film

- Hitman film poster
- Directed by: Wazed Ali Sumon
- Screenplay by: Abdullah Zahir Babu
- Story by: N. Linguswamy
- Produced by: Sojib Films
- Starring: Shakib Khan; Apu Biswas; Misha Sawdagor; Joy Chowdhury; Shirin Shila
- Music by: Ali Akram Shuvo
- Distributed by: Sojib Films
- Release date: 6 October 2014
- Running time: 147 Minutes
- Country: Bangladesh
- Language: Bengali

Hitman is a 2014 Dhallywood film directed by Wazed Ali Sumon. starring Shakib Khan and Apu Biswas in lead roles, while Misha Sawdagar, Joy Chowdhury, and Shirin Shila play other pivotal roles. The film was released on 6 October 2014 of Eid-ul-Adha in 119 screens. The film is a remake of 2012 Tamil blockbuster film Vettai.

== Plot ==
After Shuvo's father's death, Shuvo assumes the same duty of police constable. Due to his lack of bravery, Shuvo struggles to fight crime but his best friend, Rana, steps up and assists his best friend. As Shuvo wins many of Rana's battles with crime, the accolades are showered onto Shuvo to an extent that he is promoted as the Superintendent of Police. Suddenly, Shuvo is caught off guard and brutally thrashed. It becomes imperative for Rana to build his friend's courage to face his fears and overcome them. From this, Shuvo stands tall and brave. Him and Rana now tackle the villains who are out to hunt them down together.

== Cast ==
- Shakib Khan as Rana
- Apu Biswas as Tania
- Misha Sawdagor as Dabla
- Joy Chowdhury as Shuvo
- Shirin Shila as Tarin
- Sujata
- Shiba Shanu as Monir
- Bipasha Kabir Item Girl

== Soundtrack ==
Track list
No.	Title	Singer(s)	Length
1.	"Mon Pakhi Ure Jai (This song copied from Telugu song Yahoon Yahoon from movie Mirchi)"	S. I. Tutul	4:29
2.	"Dekhna O Rosiya"	Tanjima Ruma	4:23
3.	"Shopno Gulo Shotti Holo"	S. I. Tutul & Mim	4:32
4.	"Kane Kane Boli"	Asif Akbar & Kona	2:40
5.	"Rup Sagor"	Moon	4:21
