= Ahmed Sharif (Bangladeshi actor) =

Bangladeshi actor

- আহমেদ শরীফ
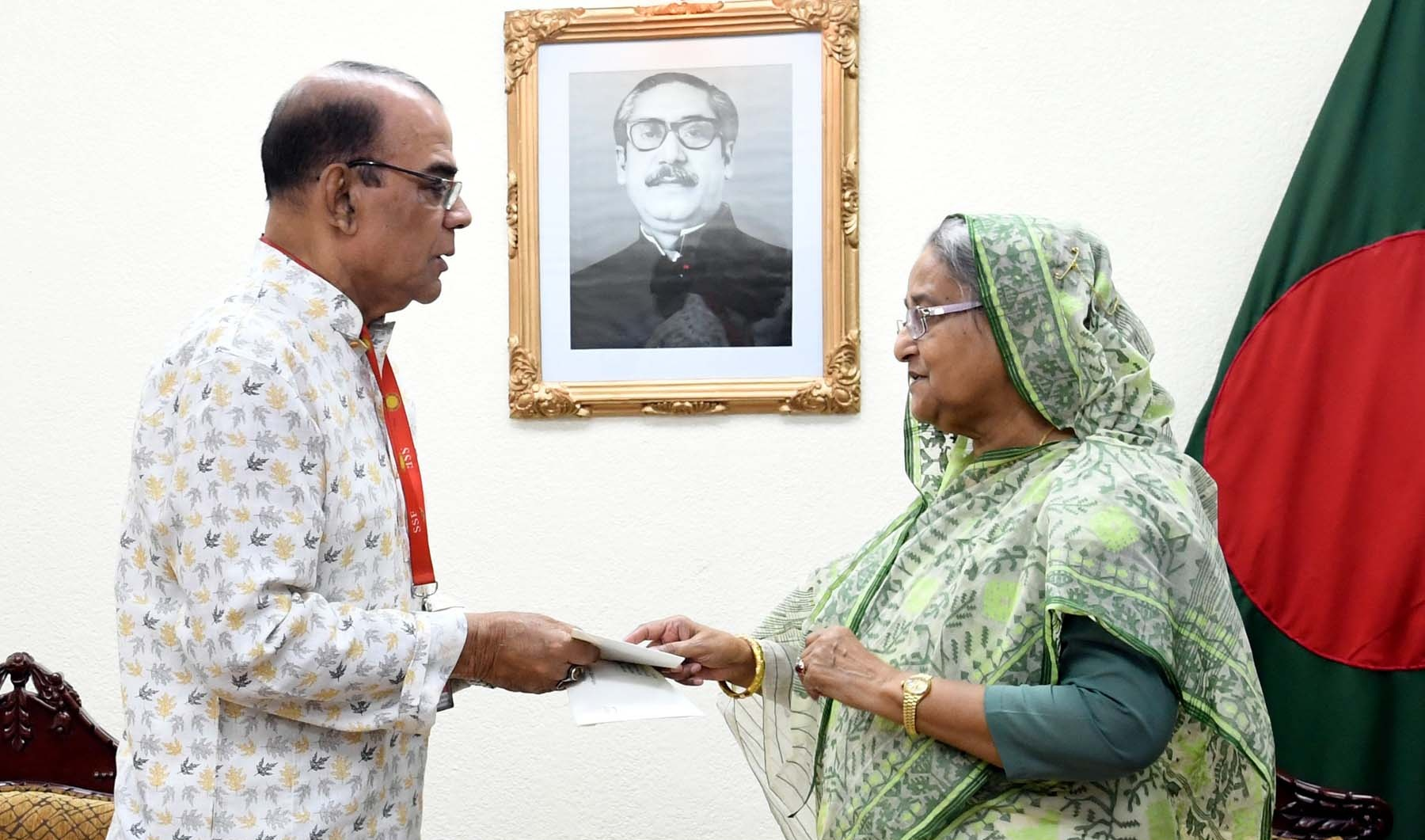
- Sharif receiving a grant for medical treatment from Prime Minister Sheikh Hasina (2019)
- Occupation: Actor
- Years active: since 1976

Ahmed Sharif is a Bangladeshi actor who has acted in more than eight hundred Bengali films.

== Career ==
In July 2014, after an Eastern Bank cheque of Tk 167,000 issued by Sharif bounced, Mosharraf Hossain Sumon, a businessman, filed a case against Sharif. In April 2018, the court delivered the verdict and sentenced Sharif a three-month jail term for cheque fraud.

== Filmography ==
Year	Title	Role	Notes	Ref.
1972	Arunodoyer Agnishakkhi			
1982	Juboraaj	Badshah Ilias Shah		
1983	Mohana			
1983	Ghorter Bour			
1985	Miss Lolita			
1985	Mahanayak			
1985	Annay Abichar			
1986	Tin Konnya			
1987	Lalu Mastan			
1987	Lady Smuggler		Urdu film	
1993	Keyamat Theke Keyamat	Khan Bahadur Nazim Uddin		
1994	Kaliya			
1994	Banglar Nayok			
1995	Den Mohor			
1997	Tiger			
1998	Meyerao Manush			
2001	Kasam	Thakur Sahab		
2001	Abbajan			
2010	Golapi Ekhon Bilatey			
2012	Most Welcome			
2012	My Name Is Sultan			
2014	Taarkata			
2015	Big Brother	Golden Gulzar		
2015	Love Marriage			
2015	Swargo Theke Norok			
2015	Run Out			
2016	Hero 420			
2023	Local			
