= Mubashir Saddique =

Pakistani YouTuber & food vlogger (born 1985)

- Born: 7 February 1985 (age 41); Shapur, Punjab, Pakistan
- Occupation: Food Vlogger
- Spouse: 2
- Children: 4

YouTube information
- Channel: Village Food Secrets
- Subscribers: 4.32 million
- Views: 965.2 million
- Last updated: 3 November 2025

Mubashir Saddique (Urdu: مبشر صدیق; born 7 February 1985), is a Pakistani YouTuber, travel vlogger, and food vlogger who is known for his Village Food Secrets channel and Mubashir Saddique Channel. He usually uploads videos of traditional village dishes and also provides alternative recipes on how to cook modern cuisine and fast food, using limited facilities in a rural setting. Moreover, he has traveled to many countries and has shown many cuisines and foods of those places in his vlogs. His father's dialogue, "Zindabad Mubashir Puttar Maza-e-a-gya" is also famous among his subscribers.

== Early life ==
Saddique was born in Shahpur, a village located 50 km (31 mi) from Sialkot. He completed his primary and secondary education in Sialkot. Before joining YouTube, he used to work as a production manager at a soccer ball manufacturing factory in Sialkot located an hour and a half from his home; however, he has since quit his factory job and works on his channel full-time. He says that he learned all of his skills, like cooking and making earthenware stoves, from his mother. His father is a retired army driver. He has two younger brothers who are also YouTubers.

== Internet career ==
Saddique says that he used to cook a special dish for his parents every Sunday, and seeing this his brother encouraged him to start a vlog on YouTube. His brother helped him set up the YouTube channel and monetize it; the first videos that Saddique recorded were with a cellphone camera. Saddique said that for the first six months, his videos received an average of 10-20 views, then some of his videos went viral, and he gained popularity.

Saddique's channel is known for showing zafarwal and noor electronics in his videos and also organic food, cooked in a village environment using simple tools and utensils such as earthenware pots, wooden cutting boards, and a hand-built earthenware oven; he grows his vegetables, and mills his flour from wheat that he also grows. He reached 1.00 million subscribers in 2018 and 1 million in April 2019. Saddique currently earns about 1,000,000 PKR (US$3500) from his channel. He also has a second vlogging channel named Mubashir Saddique with over 370,000 subscribers.

== See also ==
- Pakistani cuisine
