= Love Marriage (2015 film) =

2015 film by Shahin Sumon

- Movie poster
- Directed by: Shahin Sumon
- Written by: Delowar Hossain Dil
- Produced by: Taposhi Faruque
- Starring: Shakib Khan; Apu Biswas; Misha Sawdagor; Sadek Bachchu; Ahmed Sharif; Mizu Ahmed
- Music by: Hridoy Khan; Shawkat Ali Emon; Ali Akram Shuvo
- Production company: Heartbeat Production
- Distributed by: Heartbeat Productions
- Release date: 18 July 2015
- Country: Bangladesh
- Language: Bengali

Love Marriage is a 2015 Bangladeshi romantic drama film directed by Shahin Sumon and produced by Taposhi Faruque under the banner of Heartbeat Production. The film features Shakib Khan and Apu Biswas in the lead roles. Misha Sawdagor, Sadek Bachchu, Ahmed Sharif and Mizu Ahmed also played supporting roles in the film.

== Cast ==
- Shakib Khan as Naya Sawdagar aka Nayan
- Apu Biswas as Monica
- Misha Sawdagor
- Sadek Bachchu
- Ahmed Sharif
- Mizu Ahmed
- Kabila
- Shirin Bakul as Nayan's mother
- Bipasha Kabir (special appearance)

== Production ==
The film's muharat (ceremonial start) was held on 10 March 2015 in Shakib Khan’s house Jannat House in Pubali. The film's principal photography was done on the same day. The first lot was completed in five consecutive days till 15 March. Then, on 18 March, the entire shooting unit of the film moved to Cox's Bazar. Beginning the next day, the climax of the film and some songs were filmed in Cox's Bazar for 8 consecutive days from 19 to 26 March.

== Soundtrack ==
Track list
No.	Title	Singer(s)	Length
1.	"Love Marriage (Title Track) (This song copied from Telugu song Nuvvu Nenu Janta from movie Power)"	Asif Akbar	4:09
2.	"Bhaolobeshe Eibar Aay Kache Tui"	Hridoy Khan	4:56
3.	"Toke Onek Bhalobashi"		4:00
4.	"Chupi Chupi Mon Nile Kere"		4:04
5.	"Ami Dekhte Lale Lal"		4:01
Total length:			21:10

== Release ==
The film released on 18 July 2015 in 123 theatres all over the country.
