= Jannat (2018 film) =

Bangladeshi crime drama film

- Theatrical release poster
- Bengali: জান্নাত
- Directed by: Mostafizur Rahman Manik
- Screenplay by: Mostafizur Rahman Manik
- Story by: Sudipto Sayed Khan
- Produced by: S M Saleem Bhuiyan
- Starring: Symon Sadik; Mahiya Mahi; Misha Shawdagar; Ali Raj
- Cinematography: M H Shopon
- Edited by: Md. Shohidul Haque
- Music by: Emon Shaha; Arfin Rummy
- Distributed by: S.S Multimedia
- Release date: 22 August 2018
- Running time: 141 minutes
- Country: Bangladesh
- Language: Bengali

Jannat is a 2018 Bangladeshi crime drama film. The film story was done by Sudipto Saeed Khan and was directed by Mostafizur Rahman Manik. It features Symon Sadik, Mahiya Mahi, Ali Raj and Misha Sawdagor. The film was released worldwide on 22 August 2018. The film won five awards including Best Director and Best Actor at the 43rd Bangladesh National Film Awards.

== Cast ==
- Symon Sadik as Aslam / Iftikhar
- Mahiya Mahi as Jannat
- Ali Raj as Noor Muhammad
- Misha Sawdagor as Pir Baba
- Maruf Aqib
- Labonno Lisa
- Rahana Joly
- Sofiya Ahmed Lina
- Shimul Khan
- Chikon Ali
- Raha Tanha Khan

== Release ==
Jannat received approval from the Bangladesh Film Censor Board in the last week of March 2018 without cuts. It released in Bangladesh on 23 screens on 22 August 2018 during the Eid al-Adha holiday. According to newspapers The Daily Star and New Age, it did not do well at the box office.

One theater, the Sangeeta Cinema Hall in Satkhira, withdrew the film at the direction of police, after a complaint from the Imam Association Satkhira saying that Jannat might "hurt the religious sentiments of the people".

== Awards ==
Award Title	Category	Name	Result
39th Bachsas Awards	Best Supporting Actor (Male)	Misha Sawdagor	Won
43rd Bangladesh National Film Awards	Best Director	Mostafizur Rahman Manik	Won
43rd Bangladesh National Film Awards	Best Actor	Symon Sadik	Won
43rd Bangladesh National Film Awards	Best Supporting Actor	Ali Raj	Won
43rd Bangladesh National Film Awards	Best Music Director	Emon Saha	Won
43rd Bangladesh National Film Awards	Best Story	Sudeepto Syed Khan	Won
