= Naila Nayem =

Bangladeshi model and actress

- নায়লা নাঈম
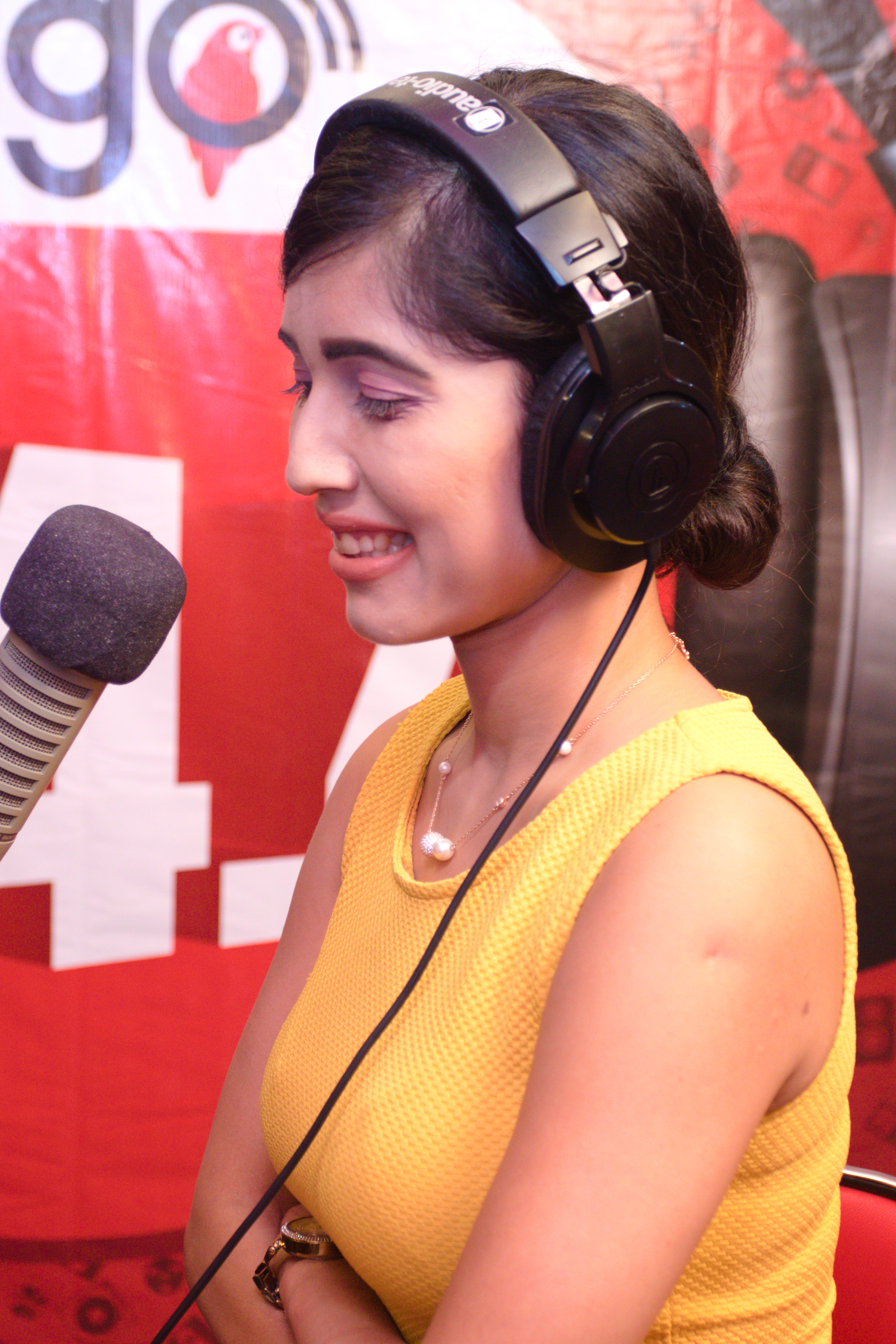
- Nayem in 2019
- Born: Naila Nayem; Barisal, Bangladesh
- Citizenship: Bangladeshi
- Occupations: Model; actress; dentist
- Years active: 2003–2019
- Known for: Glamour modeling

Naila Nayem is a Bangladeshi model and actress. She entered show business as a runway model and then became an actress.

== Early life ==
Nayem was born in Barisal, Bangladesh. She completed Bachelor of Dental Surgery (BDS) degree from City Dental College, a private dental college in Dhaka, to become a dentist.

== Career ==
Nayem is a model sometimes known as the "Sunny Leone of Bangladesh". Nayem used social media to promote herself although according to her, she never thought of using Facebook.

Besides modelling, Nayem works in television and film. She established her acting career by performing an item song in the film t. She acted in Bangla drama Ghat Babu Nitai Candra in 2013 which was based on Sunil Gangopadhyay's novel Ghat Babu. She performed in an item song. She was signed to appear in film Maruf Taka Dhorena. Nayem has also performed on Ananta Jolil in a programme organized by Grameenphone. She starred in a web series called The List by CMV.

In 2015, Nayem starred in an award-winning commercial by Bagher Bachcha Digital for LG Electronics and was hired as the campaign image of Foodpanda. In 2016, her commercial with Bangladeshi cricketer Sabbir Rahman, promoting a non-alcoholic malt beverage, was banned by the Bangladesh Cricket Board.

As of 2019, Nayem lived in Aftabnagar.

== Personal life ==
Naila's ex-husband, Tawsif Hossain Tushar, joined the Islamic State in Syria and appeared in a recruitment video for them.

== Works ==
=== Music video ===
- Vote For Thot (with Pritom Ahmed) (2014)
- City Over Night (2015)
- Baby Doll (2018)
- Bondhu Tumi Jano Na Koto Valobashi Tomake (with Taposh) (2019)
- Assam Jabo (2022)

=== Movies ===
- Run Out (2015)
- Maruf Taka Dhorena(2015)
- Ratrir Jaatri (2019)
- Abbas (2019) as Herself, cameo appearance

=== Dramas ===
- Ghat Babu Nitai Candra (2013)
- Masti Unlimited (2015)
