= Matal (2018 film) =

2018 Bangladeshi film

- Movie poster
- Directed by: Shaheen-Sumon
- Screenplay by: Ferdous Hasan Rana
- Produced by: Sharif Chowdhury
- Starring: Shipan Mitra; Symon Sadik; Adhora Khan; Twinkle Orin; Misha Sawdagor
- Music by: Masum Babul
- Production company: Sony Movies International
- Release date: 26 October 2018
- Country: Bangladesh
- Language: Bengali

Matal is a 2018 Bangladeshi romantic action film written and directed by Shahin Sumon, and produced by Sharif Chowdhury under the banner of Sony Movies International. The film features Symon Sadik, Adhora Khan, Shipan Mitra, and Orin in lead roles, with Misha Sawdagor, Mizu Ahmed, Joy Raj, Monjur Morshed, and others in supporting roles. The film faced delays due to legal complications before premiering in October 2018.

== Cast ==
- Symon Sadik as Rana
- Adhora Khan as Parisa
- Shipan Mitra as Shipan
- Orin as Orin
- Misha Sawdagor
- Mizu Ahmed
- Joy Raj
- Monjur Morshed

== Production ==
The film was produced by Sony Movies International. The script was written by Ferdous Hasan Rana. On February 13, 2018, a Maharat of the film Matal was held in a restaurant in the capital. And there announced that "Sumit Sen will star alongside Asif and Adhora". But the director, Shaheen-Suman, said that "Symon has been taken instead of Sumit in this film. Sumit has been dropped for temporary reasons".

Matal film was shot at Shakib Khan's Pubail house in Gazipur. Continuous shooting is going on till 13th. This shooting took place at Shakib Khan's shooting house, 'Jannat'. And this film was also shot at the 'Ashray' shooting house in Sector 7 of Uttara.

Director Shaheen-Suman was injured on the set of the film after slipping on set.

== Legal issues ==
On October 12, 2018, four new films were supposed to be released in more than two hundred theaters in the country. Among them were Meghkanya, Nayak, Asmani, and Matal. But how possible! Because there is a rule in the country that outside of the Eid festival, more than two new films cannot be released in a week. According to that, the director-producer of Meghkanya and Asamani finalized the release date on October 12, almost three months ago. Two other films were suddenly added to the release procession a week ago. On the other hand, two alternative films, Meghkanya and Asamani, are in trouble due to the addition of two mainstream films. Could not get booking. In this situation, Jahangir Kabir, the producer of Meghkanya, filed a writ in the High Court challenging the validity of releasing the so-called old films named Nayak and Matal. At the same time, the court issued a ruling asking why the release of the new movie as an old film should not be declared illegal. The concerned have been asked to respond to the said rule. The order of the High Court also said that the ban on the release of Nayak and Matal films will remain in force until this rule is settled. Based on this, the High Court issued a ban on the decision to release the movies Nayak and Matal as old films.

== Music ==
The film's music and soundtrack album composed by Masum Babul.

== Release ==
The release date of the film was fixed several times before, but the release of the film was delayed due to various reasons. Even though the film was scheduled to release on 12 October 2018, it was not released due to legal complications. Finally, the film was released in 80 theaters on 26 October 2018. Cashing with Ispahani Arif Jahan's Nayok and Anam Biswas's Debi.

== Reception ==
BD Morning wrote that "From the first day of its release, the audience is eager to see the film". Jago News 24 wrote that "Several cinema halls were packed with visitors".
