= Desha: The Leader =

- Theatrical release poster
- Directed by: Saikat Nasir
- Screenplay by: Saikat Nasir
- Story by: Saikat Nasir
- Produced by: Abdul Aziz
- Starring: Shipan Mitra; Mahiya Mahi; Tariq Anam Khan
- Cinematography: Chandan Roy Chowdhury; Saiful Shaheen; Sahil Rony
- Edited by: Tawhid Hossain Chowdhury
- Music by: Shafiq Tuhin; Kishor
- Production company: Jaaz Multimedia
- Distributed by: Jaaz Multimedia
- Release date: 26 December 2014
- Country: Bangladesh
- Language: Bengali

Desha: The Leader is a 2014 Bangladeshi political thriller film produced by Jaaz Multimedia. The film was scripted and directed by Saikat Nasir and features a cast that includes newcomer Shipan Mitra, Mahiya Mahi, and Tariq Anam Khan. Desha: The Leader is a story about a political reality show that turns severe. The film was released on 26 December 2014. It won four National Film Awards.

== Plot ==
Channel 99 arranges a reality show to select the next leader by SMS voting from people all over the world. The elected leader will stay in the house of the person who will vote maximum times by SMS for two days.

== Cast ==
- Shipan Mitra as Selim/Desha
- Mahiya Mahi as Shristy, The Presenter
- Tariq Anam Khan as Hasan Hyder
- Manjurul Karim
- Tiger Robi as Darbar
- Shimul Khan

== Production ==
=== Release ===
The film opened in Bangladesh on Friday, 26 December 2014 in at least 60 theaters.

== Reception ==
The New Nation reported that audiences reacted positively to the pairing of Shipan and Mahi.

=== Critical response ===
Abdullah Al Amin (Rubel) of The Daily Star gave the film two stars out of five. Although he found Tariq Anam Khan's performance "absolutely superb" and lauded the concept for its originality, the weak screenplay, direction, and cinematography "meant this movie just couldn't be the hit it could have been."

=== Accolades ===
At the 39th Bangladesh National Film Awards, Desha: The Leader won in four categories. Tariq Anam Khan won Best Actor in a Negative Role. James received his first National Award, Best Male Playback Singer, for the song "Ashche Desha Ashche". Nasir won Best Cinematography, and Towhid Hossain Chowdhury won Best Editing.

== Soundtracks ==
Abdullah Al Amin (Rubel) of The Daily Star praised the one song by James, but considered the rest of the soundtrack lackluster.

Desha: The Leader

Soundtrack album by Dilshad Nahar Kona, Kishore Das, James, A I Raju
- Released: 26 December 2014
- Recorded: 2014

No.	Title	Artist	Length
1.	""Koto Ronger Hatchani""	Kishore Das, Dilshad Nahar Kona	3:48
2.	""Desha Asche""	James	3:15
3.	""Eki Maya""	A I Raju	2:23
4.	""Bangla Maaer Gaan""	Shafiq Tuhin	3:16
