= Shahriaz =

Bangladeshi actor

Shah Riaz Hossain
- শাহ রিয়াজ
- Born: Shah Riaz Hossain; Khulna, Bangladesh
- Education: University of Oxford
- Occupations: Actor model
- Years active: 2014–present
- Known for: Pagla Diwana; Nagar Mastan; Gundami; Aaral; Meyeti Ekhon Kothay Jabe; Chol Palai; Fifty Fifty Love

Shah Riaz Hossain is a Bangladeshi actor and model. He acted in Pagla Diwana (2015), opposite to Pori Moni and in Nagar Mastan (2015) with Pori Moni. And he also acted in Gundami (2016) and Aaral (2016) with the actress Achol; starred in many others, as Shooter (2016), Meyeti Ekhon Kothay Jabe (2017), Crime Road (2017), Chol Palai (2017), Fifty Fifty Love (2018), Bou Bazar (2019), and Protishodher Agun (2019).

== Early life and education ==
Shahriz started his education life in Khulna. After finishing study in college, he went to the United Kingdom. He achieved CA degree from Oxford. Later he returned to Bangladesh.

== Career ==
After returning to Bangladesh he worked in a TV drama named Megher Kheya in 2011. He also worked in TV dramas such as Amader Songsar, Beder Meye Josna and Reaction. Besides, he worked as a ramp model.

He made his film debut in 2014 with Ki Darun Dekhte. In 2015, 4 films starring him were released, those being Putro Ekhon Poysawala, Murder 2, Pagla Diwana and Nagar Mastan. In 2016, Gundami, Aral and Shooter were released.

In 2017 he worked in 3 more films Meyeti Ekhon Kothay Jabe, Crime Road and Chol Palai — as the main male character. The movie Meyeti Ekhon Kothay Jabe won National Film Award in four categories. Besides, in that year he had guest appearance on Rajneeti which was released on Eid-Ul-Fitr. His film Fifty Fifty Love was released in 2018, and in 2019 his films Bou Bazar and Protishodher Agun were released.

== Filmography ==
Key
†	Denotes films that have not yet been released

Year	Film	Role	Director	Notes	Ref.
2014	Ki Darun Dekhte	Shongram	Wazed Ali Sumon	Debut Film	
2015	Putro Ekhon Poyshawala	Himself (Party boy)	Nargis Akhter	Comeo appearance	
2015	Murder 2	Inspector Parvez	M A Rahim		
2015	Pagla Diwana	Tamim	Wajed Ali Sumon	Debut in as lead role	
2015	Nagar Mastan	Shah Riaz	Rakibul Islam Rakib		
2016	Gundami	Abhi (Mastan)	Simon Tariq		
2016	Aaral	Shah Riaz	Shahed Chowdhury		
2016	Shooter	Vicky	Raju Chowdhury		
2017	Meyeti Ekhon Kothay Jabe	Raaj	Nader Chowdhury		
2017	Crime Road	Belal	Simon Tarique		
2017	Rajneeti	Polash Mahmud (News Reporter)	Bulbul Bishwas	Comeo appearance	
2017	Chol Palai	Junayed	Devashish Biswas		
2018	Fifty Fifty Love	Agun	Mukul Netrabadi		
2019	Bou Bazar	Fardin	Mukul Netrabadi		
2019	Protishodher Agun	Sohail	Mohammad Aslam		
TBA	Detective †	Monnoth	Tapan Ahmed	Animation Film	
TBA	Shongshar †	TBA	Apurba Rana	Filming	
TBA	Mon Niye Lukochuri †	TBA	Emdadul Haque Khan	Unreleased	
TBA	Addiction †	TBA	A K Jaman	Unreleased	
