= Farzana Rikta =

Bangladeshi actress

- ফারজানা রিক্তা
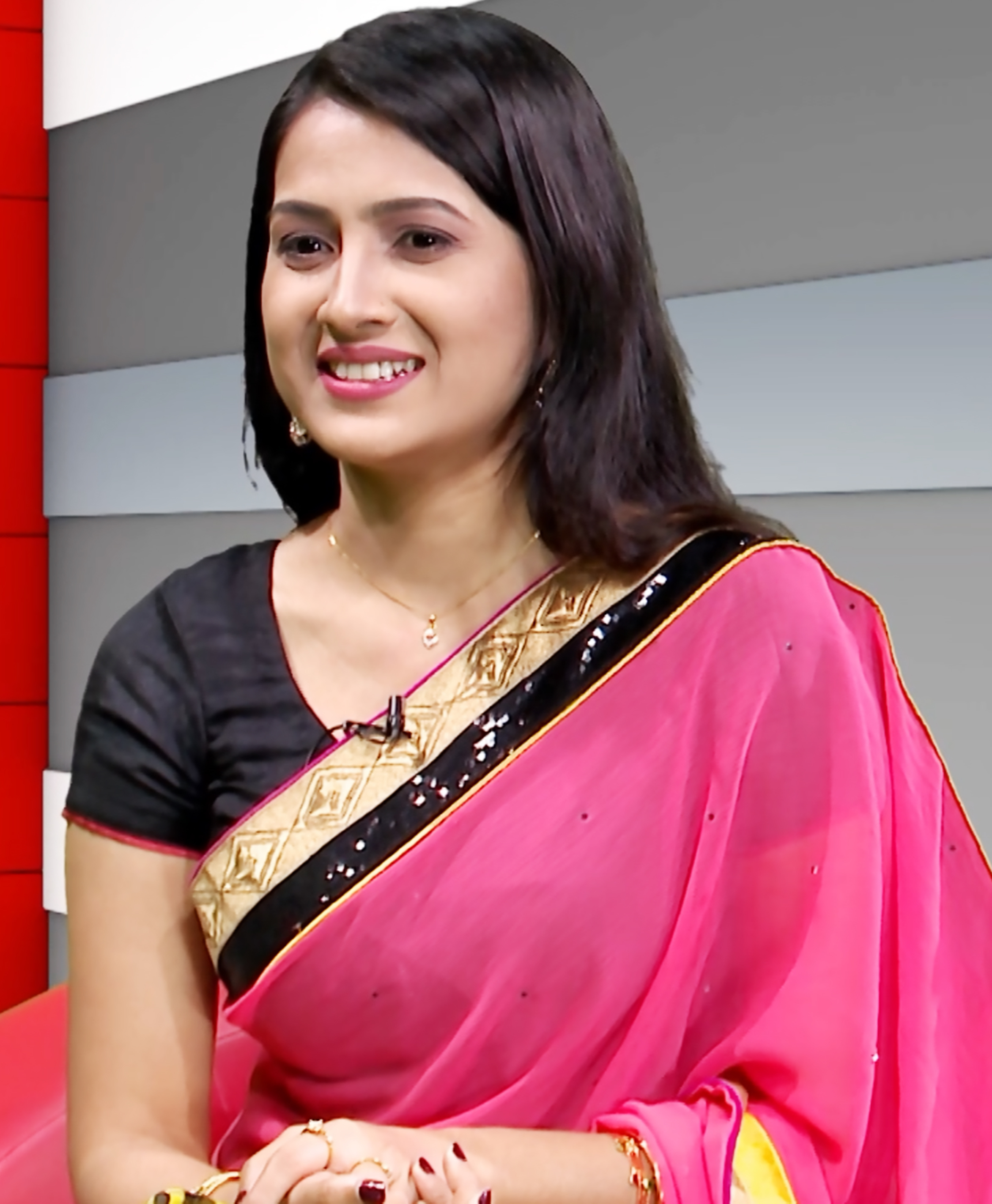
- Farzana Rikta
- Born: Farzana Rikta; Jessore, Khulna, Bangladesh
- Education: Jagannath University
- Parents: Nazrul Islam (father); Mahfuza Islam (mother)

Farzana Rikta is a Bangladeshi actress, model and television presenter who has acted in television advertisements, films and television series.

== Early life and education ==
Farzana Rikta is the only daughter of Nazrul Islam and Mahfuza Islam from the Jashore District. She obtained a Bachelor of Science degree in chemistry from Jagannath University.

== Career ==
Rikta's first professional credit was a television advertisement directed by Amitabh Reza. She made her Dhallywood film acting debut in 2015 with Kartooz, the debut film directed by Bapparaj. Her second film Ekattorer Nishan was released in 2016 and her third film Alta Banu was released in 2018.

Rikta has also acted in television and has worked as a television presenter in the productions Star World from Banglavision and FNF Journey from Gazi TV.

== Filmography ==
Year	Film
2015	Kartooz
2016	Ekattorer Nishan
2018	Alta Banu

== Selected television dramas ==
- Don
- Jole Veja Rong
- Bachelor.com
- Dulavai Jindabad
- Talk of the Town
- Chhoto Bou
- Cat House
- Bap Beta 420
- Bidesh Babu
- Lal Card

== Selected television advertisements ==
- Grameenphone Caller Tune
- RFL Chair
- RFL Fitting Pipe
- Pran Green Chilly Sauce
- Grameenphone Confusion
- Surf Excel
- Bangladesh Melamine
- Pran Frooto Juice
- Jui Coconut Oil
- Banglalion WiMax Modem
- Regal Furniture
- Airtel

== As television presenter ==
- Star Word (Banglavision)
- FNF Journey (Gazi TV)
