= Enayet Karim (director) =

Bangladeshi film director

- এনায়েত করিম
- Occupation: Film director

Enayet Karim is a Bangladeshi film director. He is most remembered for his film like Ruti (1998) which he produced. It was directed by Nadeem Mahmud and produced by Enayet Karim. He directed films like Desher Mati (1998), Kalo Choshma (1998), Khudhar Jaala etc.
