= Alta Banu =

Bangladeshi romantic drama film

- release poster
- Bengali: আলতা বানু
- Directed by: Arun Chowdhury
- Screenplay by: Brindaban Das
- Based on: Alta Banu by Faridur Reza Sagar
- Starring: Zakia Bari Momo; Anisur Rahman Milon; Farzana Rikta
- Edited by: Srimanta Dolui
- Production company: Impress Telefilm
- Release date: 20 April 2018 (Bangladesh)
- Running time: 130 Minutes
- Country: Bangladesh
- Language: Bengali

Alta Banu (Bengali: আলতা বানু) is a 2018 Bangladeshi romantic drama film directed by Arun Chowdhury and starring Zakia Bari Momo, Anisur Rahman Milon and Farzana Rikta. The screenplay, by Brindaban Das, is based on a story of the same name by Faridur Reza Sagar.

Alta Banu was filmed on the banks of the Kaliganga River in Ghior Upazila starting in July 2017, and later on the banks of the Gomati River in Comilla. It was released on 20 April 2018, at five cinema halls in Bangladesh. The film was premiered at Toronto International Film Festival, Pyongyang International Film Festival, Dhaka International Film Festival and Delhi International Film Festival.

== Cast ==
- Zakia Bari Momo as Alta
- Anisur Rahman Milon as Sohel Rana, Alta's fiancé
- Farzana Rikta as Banu, Alta's younger sister
- Raisul Islam Asad as Alta's father
- Dilara Zaman
- Shamima Nazneen
- Mamunur Rashid
- Naresh Bhuiyan

== Plot summary ==
Alta Banu tells the story of two sisters, Alta and Banu. When the younger sister disappears, the elder sister begins a journey to find her. The film highlights the social insecurity of women and addresses various taboos and superstitions present in society.

== Reception ==
=== Critical response ===
Swapan Mullick of The Statesman wrote that the film had "a restrained tone that revealed a distinct effort to reach out to a serious audience". Film director Dipankar Dipon praised Arun Chowdhury's direction & Momo's performance after watching the film.
