= Ratrir Jatri =

Bangladeshi thriller drama film

- Official poster of Ratrir Jatri
- Directed by: Habibul Islam Habib
- Written by: Habibul Islam Habib
- Produced by: Habibul Islam Habib; Faridur Reza Sagar
- Starring: Anisur Rahman Milon; Moushumi; Marzuk Russell; A.T.M. Shamsuzzaman
- Cinematography: Mokbul Hossain
- Edited by: Shajibujjaman Dipu
- Music by: Ashikuzzaman Apu
- Distributed by: Jaaz Multimedia
- Release date: 15 February 2019
- Running time: 120 minutes
- Country: Bangladesh
- Language: Bengali

Ratrir Jatri (Bengali: রাত্রির যাত্রী) is a 2019 Bangladeshi Bengali thriller drama film written and directed by Habibul Islam Habib and produced by Habibul Islam Habib and Faridur Reza Sagar. It is distributed by Jaaz Multimedia. Starring in the lead roles are Anisur Rahman Milon, Moushumi, and A.T.M. Shamsuzzaman.

== Cast ==
- Moushumi as Moyna
- Anisur Rahman Milon as Ashik
- A.T.M. Shamsuzzaman as Chairman
- Marzuk Russell as Cousin
- Salauddin Lavlu
- Shahidul Alam Sachchu
- Aruna Biswas
- Naila Nayem

== Songs ==
- Sundori Nari - musician: soundtrack Ishtiaque Hasan
- Moyna

== Release ==
The film was released in 17 theatres on 15 February 2019.

== Reception ==
The film achieved limited commercial success at the box office, it received positive recognition for its storyline and direction. Writing for Bangla Movie Database, the critic Fahim Muntasir gave rating 1.5 out of 10 and described, Rattrir Jatri as a deeply frustrating viewing experience, criticizing its weak execution, stretched screenplay, and failure to build genuine dramatic tension despite an intriguing central concept. The review noted that the film was burdened by artificial performances, poor technical production, and an overreliance on repetitive sequences, which ultimately made the narrative monotonous and tedious for the audience. Rahman Moti of Bangla Movie Database characterized the film as having a strong, compelling narrative that was severely undermined by weak technical execution and direction. The critic noted that while the underlying story possessed significant potential and dealt with engaging themes, the overall impact was diluted due to inconsistent pacing, poor scene transitions, and flawed cinematic techniques.
