= Ali Raj =

Bangladeshi actor

Ali Raz
- Born: Anwar Hossen; 15 March 1957 (age 69); Sirajganj, East Pakistan, Pakistan
- Other name: W Anwar
- Occupation: Actor

Anwar Hossen (known as Ali Raz; born 15 March 1957) is a Bangladeshi film actor who has appeared in nearly 400 films in Dhallywood. He won Bangladesh National Film Award for Best Supporting Actor twice for his roles in the films Pure Jay Mon (2016) and Jannat (2018). (Note: multiple sources:) He is the current executive member of the Bangladesh Film Artistes Association, the organisation of local film artists.

== Career ==
In 1970s, Raj got his first break in BTV drama Bhangoner Shobdo Shuni. In 1977, he shifted from his home Sirajganj to Dhaka. In 1984, Razzaq made the film Shotbhai in which he played the half brother of Razzaq. Then, he became a leading actor and starred in hundreds of films in 1980s and 1990s. In 2010s, he returned to Dhallywood and switched to playing supporting roles.

== Works ==
- Padma Meghna Jamuna (1991)
- Dongshon (1992)
- Ei Ghor Ei Songsar (1996)
- Chachchu (2006)
- Bhaolobeshe Morte Pari (2010)
- PoraMon (2013)
- Ki Prem Dekhaila (2013)
- Onek Sadher Moyna (2014)
- Agnee (2014)
- Dobir Saheber Songsar (2014)
- Chuye Dile Mon (2015)
- Pure Jay Mon (2016)
- Milon Shetu (2017)
- Rajneeti (2017)
- Jannat (2018)
- Rakkhosh (2026) as Shamsher Seikh
- Ananda Ashru (2026)
