= Run Out (film) =

- Directed by: Tonmoy Tansen
- Written by: Rafiqul Islam
- Produced by: Sadat Mahmud Tanvir
- Starring: Shajal Noor; Mousumi Nag; Rumana Swarna; Omar Sani; Tariq Anam Khan; Ahmed Sharif
- Cinematography: Tonmoy Tansen
- Edited by: Mahfuzul Hasan Sajib
- Distributed by: New Gen Entertainment
- Release date: 16 October 2015
- Country: Bangladesh
- Language: Bengali

Run Out is a 2015 Bangladeshi action romance film written by Rafiqul Islam Poltu. Directed by Tonmoy Tansen, it is presented by Sadat Mahmud Tanvir as a production of New Gen Entertainment. Development began in February 2012. The film stars Shajal Noor, Rumana Swarna, Mousumi Nag, Tanvir Hossain Probal, Mahmudul Islam Selim, Sabiha Masum, Goutam Saha, Jubayer Hillol, Zara, Aurindom Nattya Gosthi and Tariq Anam Khan in a cameo in the film.

== Cast ==
- Shajal Noor as Kishore
- Mousumi Nag as Zenith
- Rumana Swarna as Nila
- Tanvir Hossain Probal
- Tariq Anam Khan
- Mahmudul Islam Selim
- Omar Sani
- Ahmed Sharif
- Naila Nayem as an item number

== Soundtrack ==
- Opekkha
- Janala Khole Dao
- Jotota Dure
- Ekbar Bolo
- Elomelo (Kromosh)
- Opekkha (2nd Version)
- Mon Diye Mon Nite

== See also ==
- List of Bangladeshi films of 2015
