= Mostafizur Rahman Manik =

Bangladeshi film director

Mustafizur Rahman Manik
- Born: 1 December
- Citizenship: Bangladesh
- Known for: film director
- Spouse: Jahura Akhtar Yuthi (d.2022)

Mustafizur Rahman Manik is a Bangladeshi film director. His works include Mon Chuyeche Mon, Tomar Preme Porechi, Eto Prem Eto Maya, and Anando Ashru (2020). He won Bangladesh National Film Award for Best Director for the film Jannat (2018).

== Films ==
- Dui Noyoner Alo (2005)
- Jannat (2018)
- Dark World (2024)
- Anondo Osru (2026)
