= Shajal Noor =

Bangladeshi actor

- সজল
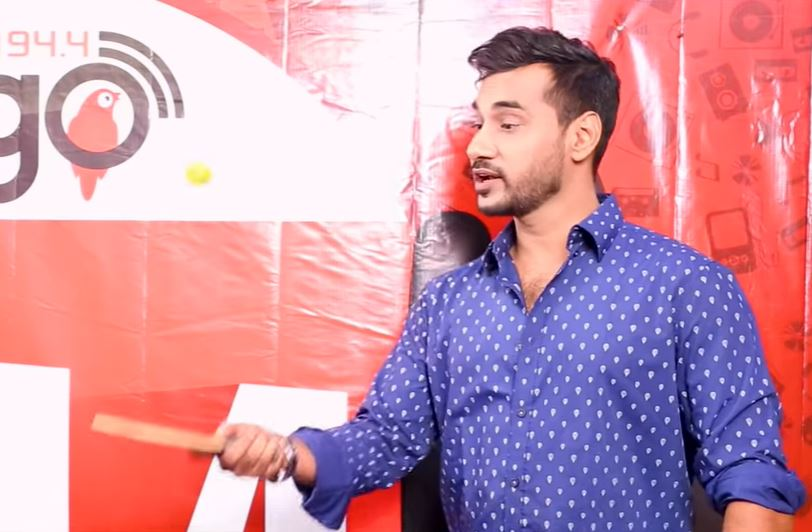
- Shajal in 2019
- Born: Abdun Noor Shajal
- Education: Dhaka College, Jahangirnagar University
- Occupations: Actor and model
- Years active: 2000–present
- Awards: Meril Prothom Alo Awards

Abdun Noor Shajal (known as Shajal) is a Bangladeshi actor and model. Shajal began his career through modelling before he started acting on television. He appeared in several films, including Jinn, Haar Jeet, Run Out.

== Eaducation ==
Shajal was a student of Dhaka College and studied Bachelor's in Business Administration at Jahangirnagar University.

== Career ==
Shajal is one of the most popular actors of this time who step in media as a host and a model. He made an appearance for TV commercial of "Starship Condensed Milk" directed by Afzal Hossain and also has been picked as a model for TVC of Cute Shampoo. Shajal Noor started his career as an anchor on a popular magazine show called "Virgin Takdum Takdum" in 2000.

In 2004, Shajal made his acting debut in a drama called "Tokhono Jante Baki,". He got recognition as an actor in the drama "Hiraful" directed by Afzal Hossain.

In 2016, the shooting of a film titled 'Sangjog' started with the mass funding of his film. Directed by Abu Sayyid, the film starred Syed Shamsul Haque, Inamul Haque, KS Firoz and four other television reporters at that time. Sajal has been newly added to the film, with newcomer Saima Smriti as its heroine. Shajal is expected to enter the silver screen with an action romantic film called "Run Out" which is directed by Tonmoy Tansen. Recently, he is acting in a new film titled 'Suvarnabhoomi'. The producer is Zahid Hossain.

== Filmography ==
Year	Title	Role	Notes	Ref.
2010	Nijhum Oronye	Saikat	Film debut	
2012	Charulota		Released on Channel i	
2015	Run Out	Kishore		
2023	Jinn	Rafsan "Raf"		
2025	Jinn 3	Bijoy		
2025	Bachelor in Trip			
2026	Ritukamini †	TBA	Post-production	
2026	Durbar †	TBA	Post-production	
2026	Dujone †	TBA	Filming	
2026	Operation Jackpot †	TBA	Announced	
TBA	Shubarna Bhoomi †	TBA		
TBA	Shongjog †	TBA		

== Television ==
Year	Title	Playwright & Director	Co-stars	Notes
2004	Boyosh Jokhon Ekush	Taher Shipon	Chandni	TV serial
2004	Bhalobashar Pathshala Nai	Srishti	Badhon	TV play
2010	Haruner Mongol Houk	Parvez Amin	Chandni	TV play
2010	Hey Rajkonya	Hridi Huq		
2011	Bish Othoba Ek Fota Jol	Anjan Aich		Played 8 characters
2012	Revolving Chair	Anurup Aich	Bindu, Maznun Mizan	TV play
2012	Nimesh		Sumaiya	TV play
2012	Phone Call	Dipankar Dipon	Momo	TV play
2012	Hawa Balloon	Shokal Ahmed		TV play
2012	Chemistry	Shafiqur Rahman Shantanu	Sarika	TV play
2012	Ami, Trina O Magic	Tanim Rahman Angshu		TV play
2013	Narir Bondhon	Nuzhat Ahmed Alvi		TV play
2013	Golpoti Tomar Amar	Mizanur Rahman Ariyan		
2013	Akrosh	Sahriar Rahman	Rumana	TV play
2013	Bhul Thikanai Jatra	Mohan Khan	Shokh	TV serial
2013	Janala Kabyo	Imran Hossain Emu	Shokh	TV play
2013	Lukochuri	Shahin Kabir Tutul	Momo, Mehzabin	
2013	Common Dialogue	Nuzhat Ahmed Alvi	Mehzabin, Sneha	
2013	Shei Shob Dingulo '1971'	Hridi Huq	Mosharraf, Tisha	
2014	Ghunpoka	Zakaria Shoukhin	Mou	Telefilm
2014	Isharar Opekkhay	Mesbah Uddin Sumon	Mehzabin	TV play
2015	Kolapatar Ghor	GM Saikat	Badhon	TV play
2015	Bala	Nuzhat Ahmed Alvi	Chandni	TV play
2015	Tarpor Nodi	Nuzhat Ahmed Alvi	Nobel, Mila Hossain	Telefilm
2015	Bojhena Se Bojhena	Nuzhat Ahmed Alvi	Momo, Pial Hossain	TV play
2015	Amake Ekta Golpo Diben Please?	Mehedi Hasan	Kayesh Chowdhury, Tisha	TV play
2015	Shesh Odhyay	Rezaur Rahman Rizvi	Joyoshri Kar, Sumaiya, Ismat Ara	TV serial
2015	Sundar Asunder Smart	Ejaj Munna	Tanjin, Maznun Mizan, Saba	TV serial
2015	Target 007	Matia Banu Shuku	Suzana, Asha, Peya	TV serial
2015	Hridoyta Chhuye Dekho	Harunur Rashid	Badhon, Zafrin Sultana, Suchanda Sikdar	Telefilm
2015	Canvas of Love	SK Shakil	Sonya Hossain	TV play
2015	Amar Buk Bhenge Jay	Syed Muhibur Rahman	Hasin, Raisul Islam Asad	Telefilm

== Awards ==
CJFB Performance Award - 2011 - Best TV Actor

RTV Star Award

Year	Category	Dhrama Name	Result	Note/s
2013	Best Actor	Color Life	Won	
