= Bangladesh Film Directors Association =

Trade association

The Bangladesh Film Directors Association is the pan-national trade body of film directors in Bangladesh. The association's general secretary is Badiul Alam Khokon. Mushfiqur Rahman Gulzar is the president of the association.

== Controversies ==
On 30 July 2016 the association organized a protest rally outside of Bangladesh National Press Club to protest against the government decision to allow the screening of a number of Hindi movies in local theaters.

In April 2017 the association banned its members from working with Shakib Khan after he made comments in the press criticizing directors.
