= University of Development Alternative =

Private university in Bangladesh

University Of Development Alternative (UODA)
- Motto: Education for Human Development
- Type: Private
- Established: 2002
- Chancellor: President Mirza Fakhrul Islam Alamgir
- Vice-Chancellor: Mohammed Rahmatullah
- Students: 12,000
- Location: Lalmatia, Mohammadpur Thana, Dhaka - 1209, Dhaka, Bangladesh; 23.7523°N 90.3694°E
- Campus: Urban
- Website: uoda.edu.bd

The University Of Development Alternative (UODA) is a private university in Bangladesh.

== History ==
This idea was founded and initiated by the president of UODA, Mujib Khan. In 2002 the Government of Bangladesh approved the University of Development Alternative (UODA), and now under 6 faculties, UODA offers undergraduate courses in over 14 subjects. The students can also achieve their master's degree in their respective subjects after their respective 4 years undergraduate programmes. Its temporary campuses are in Lalmatia, Dhaka, Bangladesh.

== Background ==
A group of individuals formed a non-profit and non-political social organization, the Student Welfare Organization of Bangladesh (SWOB) in 1978 for guiding the youth. To achieve SWOB's mission, the College of Development Alternative (CODA) was founded in 1992 and the School of Development Alternative (SODA) in 1996. The University of Development Alternative started its journey in 2002. The three institutions embody the original vision of a system of Complete Education for Alternative Development (CEFAD), imparting technical and social education from childhood to maturity.

In 2002 the government of Bangladesh approved the University Of Development Alternative (UODA). Under four faculties, UODA offers four-year honors degrees in 14 subjects. The university also facilitates post graduate education (Master's).

== Academic collaboration ==
=== Accreditation and academic collaboration ===
UODA is accredited by the Universities Grants Commission (UGC), Dhaka, Bangladesh. Efforts are on going to expand academic collaboration through exchange programmes and mutual accreditation with leading universities of the world.

=== Scope ===
UODA has the authority, under its charter, to confer degrees on the students, both at the undergraduate and graduate levels, in all faculties of Arts and Sciences including the fields of Engineering, Law, Agriculture and Medicine. It also has the authority to grant diplomas, certificates and other academic distinctions. Currently UODA offers Bachelors and master's degrees in a large number of disciplines.

== List of vice-chancellors ==
- Mohammed Rahmatullah (died)

== Schools ==
=== School of Arts ===
- Department of English offers a bachelor's degree
- Department of Fine Arts offers a bachelor's degree, BFA and a master's degree (MFA)
- Department of Music
- Department of Bengali (Bangla)
- Department of Mathematics
- Department of Law and Human Rights
- Department of Communication and Media Studies (CMS) offers a bachelor's degree
- Department of English

=== School of Life Science ===
The School of Life Science is the largest faculty. The departments are:

- The Department of Biotechnology and Genetic Engineering
- Department of Molecular Medicine and Bioinformatics (MMB)
- Department of Pharmacy

=== School of Engineering and Communication ===
- Department of Computer Science and Engineering (CSE) offers a bachelor's degree
- Department of Electronics and Telecommunication Engineering (ETE) offers a bachelor's degree
- Department of Mathematics (BSc Math) offers a bachelor's degree
- Department of Statistics
- Department of Chemistry and Chemical Technology
- Department of Physics and Electronics

=== School of Social Science ===
- Department of International Relations
- Department of Politics and Development
- Department of Economics
- Department of Communication and Media Studies

=== School of Business Administration ===
- Department of Business Administration (BBA, MBA)

==== Majors ====
- Marketing
- Finance
- Human Resource Management (HRM)
