= Saikat Nasir =

Bangladeshi cinematographer, writer and director

- সৈকত নাসির
- Occupation: Film director
- Years active: 2014–present
- Notable work: Desha: The Leader
- Awards: National Film Awards (1st time)

Saikat Nasir is a Bangladeshi cinematographer, writer, and director. He won the Bangladesh National Film Award for Best Cinematography for the film Desha: The Leader (2014).

== Filmography ==
=== Films ===
Year	Film	Notes	Ref.
2014	Desha: The Leader	Won – Bangladesh National Film Award for Best Cinematography	
2016	Hero 420	Indo-Bangladesh joint production	
2018	Pashan		
2022	Talash		
2023	Paap		
2023	Sultanpur		
2023	Casino		
TBA	Akbar: Once Upon A Time In Dhaka		
TBA	A Journey With You		
TBA	Cash		
TBA	London Love		
TBA	Agnee 3		

=== Web series ===
Year	Series	Language	Notes	Ref.
2019	Bad Boys	Bengali		
2021	The Trapped	Bengali, Farhan Khan Rio, Ador Azad, Airin Sultana		
TBA	Network	Bengali		

== Awards and nominations ==
National Film Awards

Year	Award	Category	Film	Result
2014	National Film Award	Best Cinematography	Desha: The Leader	Won

Babisas Award

Year	Award	Category	Film	Result
2014	Babisas Award	Best Film Director	Desha: The Leader	Won

Channel i Music Awards

Year	Award	Category	Song	Result
2019	channel i music award	Best Music Video Director	Bristi ele e asho tumi	Won
