= Chachchu Amar Chachchu =

2010 Bangladeshi drama film

- Movie poster
- Directed by: P. A. Kajol
- Screenplay by: P.A. Kajal; Dialogue: Kamol Sarkar
- Story by: P.A. Kajal
- Produced by: Mithun Chakrobarty
- Starring: Shakib Khan; Apu Biswas; Abdur Razzak; Prarthana Fardin Dighi
- Cinematography: Mujibul Haque Bhuiyan
- Edited by: Chishti Jamal
- Music by: Emon Saha; Shouquat Ali Imon; Background Music: Nilu
- Production company: Taaj Kothachitro
- Distributed by: Tonmoy Kothachitro
- Release date: 11 September 2010
- Running time: 150 minutes (YouTube version)
- Country: Bangladesh
- Language: Bengali

Chachchu Amar Chachchu is 2010 Bangladeshi drama film directed by P. A. Kajol and produced by Mithun Chakraborty under the banner of Taj Kathachitra. It features an ensemble cast including Shakib Khan, Apu Biswas, Abdur Razzak, Prarthana Fardin Dighi, Shuchorita, Mizu Ahmed, Subrata, Rehana Jolly.

The film was released in cinemas on 11 September 2010. The soundtrack of the film is composed by Emon Saha. Its edited by Chishti Jamal, while cinematography done by Mujibul Haque Bhuiyan and choreography was by Masum Babul, Imdadul Haque Khokon and Habibur Rahman Habib. It is marked playback debut of Sabrina Porshi. Prarthana Fardin Dighi won her third National Film Award for Best Child Artist.

== Cast ==
- Shakib Khan as Rafat Mallick
- Apu Biswas as Bubly Talukder
- Razzak as Rafique Mallick
- Rehana Jolly as Shahana
- Prarthana Fardin Dighi as Tripty
- Suchorita as Tripty's mother
- Mizu Ahmed as Sultan Shikder
- Subrata as Police inspector
- Amir Siraji as Jobbar Talukder
- Abdus Sattar as Asad
- Begum Montu as Asad's mother
- Jacky Alamgir as Jacky

== Soundtrack ==
Chachchu Amar Chachchu

Soundtrack album by Emon Saha
- Released: 5 September 2010
- Recorded: 2009
- Studio: Taaj Kothachitro
- Genre: Feature Film Soundtrack
- Length: 28:00
- Language: Bengali
- Label: CD Choice
- Producer: Emon Saha

Emon Saha chronology
| Khoj: The Search (2010) | Chachchu Amar Chachchu (2010) | Top Hero (2010) |

The soundtrack is composed by Emon Saha along with a song composed by Shouquat Ali Imon, which consisting total six songs. The audio album of the soundtrack is released on 5 September 2010. Sabrina Porshi made her playback debut with the films title track "Tumi Amar Bondhu Khelar Sathi". It was recorded in 2009, which was also her first studio recording.

Chachchu Amar Chachchu track listing
| No. | Title | Lyrics | Music | Singer(s) | Length |
|---|---|---|---|---|---|
| 1. | "Ami Jeno Chure" | | | Andrew Kishore |
| 2. | "Ami Ekdin" | | | Kumar Bishwajit, Baby Naznin |
| 3. | "Tumi Amar Bondhu" | Kabir Bakul | Shouquat Ali Imon | Sabrina Porshi | 4:48 |
| 4. | "Jodi Boner Shape" | | | Andrew Kishore, Runa Laila |
| 5. | "Dui Choke Amar Keno" | | | Kanak Chapa |
| 6. | "Doyal" | | | Bari Siddiqui |
| Total length: | | | | | 28:00 |

== Release ==
The film was released in 40 cinemas on 11 September 2010 on occasion of Eid al-Fitr clashing with Khan's other two films. It is one of the most commercially successful films released on 2010 Eid al-Fitr.

== Accolades ==
National Film Award (Bangladesh)

Bangladesh National Film Award for Best Child Artist

Won – Prarthana Fardin Dighi

== Sources ==
- BFDC (2012). "List of National Film Award recipients name 1975–2012" (PDF). Bangladesh Film Development Corporation (in Bengali). Dhaka: Ministry of Information (Bangladesh). pp. 1–23. Archived from the original (PDF) on 1 November 2020.
