= Amar Shopno Tumi =

2005 Bangladeshi comedy drama film

- Movie poster
- Directed by: Hasibul Islam Mizan
- Screenplay by: Hasibul Islam Mizan; Dialogue Zaman Akhter
- Story by: Zaman Akhter
- Produced by: Mahmood Haque Shamim
- Starring: Shakib Khan Shabnur Ferdous Ahmed
- Cinematography: Z.H. Mintu
- Edited by: Shahidul Haque
- Music by: Ahmed Imtiaz Bulbul
- Production company: S.N.N. Pictures
- Distributed by: S.N.N. Pictures
- Release date: 1 July 2005
- Running time: 143 minutes (YouTube version)
- Country: Bangladesh
- Language: Bengali

Amar Shopno Tumi (Bengali: আমার স্বপ্ন তুমি) is a 2005 Bangladeshi romantic action drama film directed by Hasibul Islam Mizan and produced by Mahmood Haque Shamim under the banner of S.N.N Pictures. The film's story and dialogue came from Zaman Akhter with screenplay by the director. It features Shakib Khan, Shabnur and Ferdous Ahmed in the lead roles with ATM Shamsuzzaman, Abul Hayat, Sharmili Ahmed, Rehana Jolly supporting cast.

The soundtrack of the film is composed by Ahmed Imtiaz Bulbul. The film's editing was by Shahidul Haque and cinematography done by Z.H. Mintu with choreography handled by Masum Babul and Imdadul Haque Khokon. It is the most successful film in director Hasibul Islam Mizan's career. Shakib Khan played an anti-hero in the film. His acting in the film is considered as one of the best performances of Khan's career. The rise of Shakib Khan's career started with this film. It is one of the highest-grossing films of 2005, also one of the highest-grossing films of Khan's career.

== Synopsis ==
Shumon is educated but unemployed and is living in the Anantopur village after finishing his B.A. degree. Khushi is a pathological liar who also lives in the same village. They are at each other's throats all the time. Eventually, Shumon falls in love with Khushi. But Khushi does not love him, she loves Sahed.Thus, the story of a love triangle commences.

== Cast ==
- Ferdous as Shahed
- Shabnur as Khushi
- Shakib Khan as Sumon
- ATM Shamsuzzaman as Khushi's father
- Rasheda Chowdhury as Khushi's mother
- Abul Hayat as Shahed's father
- Sharmili Ahmed ad Shahed mother
- Rehana Jolly as Shumon's mother
- Shushmi
- Afzal Sharif as Shumon's friend
- Jasmin Akter Jasmin
- Don
- Nasir Khan

== Soundtrack ==
Amar Shopno Tumi (Original Motion Picture Soundtrack)

Soundtrack album by Ahmed Imtiaz Bulbul
- Released: 1 January 2005
- Studio: S.N.N. Pictures
- Genre: Feature Film Soundtrack
- Length: 30:31
- Label: Anupam Recording Media
- Producer: Ahmed Imtiaz Bulbul, Mahmood Haque Shamim

Ahmed Imtiaz Bulbul chronology
Dui Noyoner Alo (2005)	Amar Shopno Tumi (Original Motion Picture Soundtrack) (2005)	Tokair Hate Ostro Keno (2006)
External videos
- Video jukebox on YouTube

The soundtrack of the film was composed by Ahmed Imtiaz Bulbul, with lyrics penned by Kabir Bakul. The soundtrack contains six songs.

No.	Title	Singer(s)	Length
1.	"Tumar Oi Mukher Hashi"	Andrew Kishore	4:46
2.	"Diboshe Tomake Chai"	Andrew Kishore. Sabina Yasmin	6:08
3.	"Amar Jibone Tumi"	Monir Khan, Sabina Yasmin	5:08
4.	"O Khushi O Khushi"	Monir Khan, Sabina Yasmin	4:18
5.	"Ami Sotto Kotha Boli"	Anee Banarjee	4:57
6.	"Brishti Premer-e Brishti"	Anee Banarjee	5:20
Total length:			30:31

== Reception ==
Shakib Khan was played as anti-hero in the film. He won the hearts of all the audiences with this character. The film is a turning point in Shakib's career. Shakib Khan's performance in the film left the industry in awe. He was able to turn around his career. It is the most successful film in director Hasibul Islam Mizan's career. It is one of the highest-grossing films of 2005, also one of the highest-grossing films of Khan's career. His demand in the industry increased after the film became a superhit.
