= Shera Nayok =

- YouTube version poster
- সেরা নায়ক
- Directed by: Wakil Ahmed
- Written by: Wakil Ahmed
- Produced by: Kazi Mohammad Islam Miah
- Starring: Shakib Khan; Apu Biswas; Misha Sawdagor; Shiba Shanu
- Cinematography: Kamrul Islam Ponir
- Edited by: Amzad Hossain
- Music by: Ali Akram Shuvo
- Production company: Shocheton Film Media
- Distributed by: Shocheton Film Media
- Release date: 6 October 2014
- Running time: 145 minutes
- Country: Bangladesh
- Language: Bengali

Shera Nayok (Bengali: সেরা নায়ক; transl. The Great Hero) is a Bangladeshi romantic action film directed by Wakil Ahmed who also wrote its story, dialogues and screenplay. The film is based on love and conflict. It features Shakib Khan and Apu Biswas in the lead roles. It also features Ali Raj, Misha Sawdagor, Shiba Shanu, Sucharita, Kabila, Rebeka Rouf, Subrata and debutant Ani in supporting roles.

The soundtrack was composed by Ali Akram Shuvo, cinematography handled by Kamrul Islam Ponir, DOP by Mohiuddin Monir, choreographed by Masum Babul and editing was by Amzad Hossain. The film initially faced clearance issues, but on September 30, 2014, it received censor clearance without any cuts. The film begun as a pre-titled Shodh (transl. Revenge). Later the name was changed to Shera Nayok.

== Cast ==
- Shakib Khan as Bijoy
- Apu Biswas as Baby
- Misha Sawdagor as Bahar, Baby's brother
- Ali Raj as Baby and Bahar's father
- Kabila
- Prabir Mitra as Bijoy's father
- Shiba Shanu as Shanu
- Rebeka Rouf as Bijoy's mother
- Suchorita as Baby and Bahar's mother
- Afzal Sharif
- Saral Hasmat
- Ani

== Production ==
The film's inauguration was held in a grand ceremony at Vishtech Studio, Dhaka on June 30, 2013. The production of the film was begun with the name Shodh, but was changed to Sera Nayok before release. Apu Biswas performed opposite Shakib Khan in the film, where her character is named Baby. Also Misha Sawdagor plays an important role in this film, which was based on family conflict.

== Soundtrack ==
Shera Nayok

Soundtrack album by Ali Akram Shuvo
- Released: 2014
- Studio: Shocheton Film Media
- Genre: Film soundtrack
- Length: 19:03
- Language: Bengali language
- Label: SB Movie Song
- Producer: Ali Akram Shuvo

Ali Akram Shuvo chronology
| Daring Lover (2014) | Shera Nayok (2014) | Hitman (2014) |

The film's soundtrack was composed by Ali Akram Shuvo with lyrics penned by Wakil Ahmed, Munshi Wadud and Sudeep Kumar Dip. The songs were sung by Andrew Kishore, Monir Khan, Dilshad Nahar Kona, Asif Akbar, S.I. Tutul.

Track listing
| No. | Title | Singer(s) | Length |
|---|---|---|---|
| 1. | "Premete Pagolpara" | Dilshad Nahar Kona and S I Tutul | 5:05 |
| 2. | "Chotto Ekta Mon (Oh Baby I Love You)" | Dilshad Nahar Kona and Rupam | 4:19 |
| 3. | "Bhai Ar Bon" | Monir Khan and Swaralipi | 4:36 |
| 4. | "Ore Dushtu Mon" | Asif Akbar | 5:03 |
| Total length: | | | 19:03 |

== Release and reception ==
Sera Nayok got censor clearance without any cut from Bangladesh Film Censor Board on September 30, 2014. The film was released in 40 cinemas around the country on October 6, 2014, on the occasion of Eid al-Adha.

The film became the third commercial success of 2014 with 50 percent collection at the box office.
