= Prarthana Fardin Dighi =

Bangladeshi film actress

- প্রার্থনা ফারদিন দীঘি
- Prarthana Fardin Dighi in 2025
- Born: Prarthana Fardin Dighi; 26 October 2000 (age 25); Dhaka, Bangladesh
- Education: Stamford School & College, Dhaka
- Occupations: Film actress, model
- Years active: 2006–2015 (Child Actress); 2021-Present
- Notable work: Kabuliwala; Ek Takar Bou
- Spouse: Chinmay Roy
- Parent(s): Shahrukh Fardin Subrata; Ifte Ara Dalia Doyel (d. 2011)
- Awards: National Film Award (3rd time)

Prarthana Fardin Dighi (popularly known as Dighi) is a Bangladeshi Dhallywood film actress and model. She won the Bangladesh National Film Award for Best Child Artist three times for the films Kabuliwala (2006), Ek Takar Bou (2008), and Chachchu Amar Chachchu (2010).

She made her debut as an adult lead actress with the film Tumi Acho Tumi Nei (2021) which was directed by Delwar Jahan Jhantu and she acted in Mujib: The Making of a Nation, a 2023 Bangladeshi-Indo epic biographical film which follows the life of Sheikh Mujibur Rahman, the first president of Bangladesh, which was directed by Shyam Benegal.

== Early life and education ==
Dighi was born on 26 October 2000 in Dhaka. She was born into a family connected to the Bangladeshi film industry. Her father, Shahrukh Fardin Subrata, is a film actor, and her mother, Ifte Ara Dalia Doyel, was also an actress. Dighi grew up in Dhaka and was exposed to cultural and artistic activities from an early age, which influenced her early involvement in acting .

She completed her schooling in Dhaka and later studied at Stamford School & College. In 2019, she passed the Secondary School Certificate (SSC) examination. She later completed her Higher Secondary Certificate (HSC) from Stamford College. In 2022, Dighi enrolled in the Journalism and Media Studies department at the University of Liberal Arts Bangladesh (ULAB) to pursue higher education alongside her acting career.

== Filmography ==
=== As Lead role ===
Key
†	Denotes films that have not yet been released

Year	Films	Role	Notes	Ref.
2021	Tumi Acho Tumi Nei	Ruma / Momotamoyi	Debut in as lead role	
2021	Tungiparar Miya Bhai	Sheikh Fazilatunnesa Mujib		
2023	Mujib: The Making of a Nation	Sheikh Fazilatunnesa Mujib "Young Renu"	Indo-Bangladesh joint production	
2024	Srabon Josnay	Mou		
2024	36 24 36	Priyontee		
2025	Jongli	Nupur		
2026	Biday †	TBA	Filming	
TBA	Deyal †	TBA	Filming	

=== Webfilms & Short films ===
Year	Films	Role	Notes	Ref.
2022	Shesh Chithi	Tuli	Released on Chorki	
2023	Phera	Naznin / Shahnaz	Released on RTV Plus	
2023	Murder 90s	Prema	Released on RTV Plus	
2024	Gaiyan	Rumki	Short film on Bongo BD	
2025	Priyo Prakton	Toma	Released on Bongo BD	
2025	Hide 'n Seek	Rasha	Released on Deepto TV	

=== As child artist ===
Year	Films	Role	Director	Notes
2006	Kabuliwala	Child artist Mini	Kazi Hayat	Debut film
2006	Chachchu	Jui	F I Manik	
2006	Dadima	Megha	F I Manik	
2007	Saajghor	Child artist	F I Manik	
2007	Obuj Shishu	Child artist	Shafiqul Islam Bhairabi	
2007	Kopal	Child artist	Hasibul Islam Mizan	
2008	Baba Amar Baba	Sukhi / Rakha	Ilias Kanchan	
2008	Ek Takar Bou	Child artist	P. A. Kajol	
2009	Piriter Agun Jole Digun	Child artist	P. A. Kajol	
2009	Panch Takar Prem	Child artist	Shaheen Sumon	
2010	Rickshawalar Chele	Child artist	Montazur Rahman Akbar	
2010	Chachchu Amar Chachchu	Tripti	F I Manik	
2010	Jibon Moroner Sathi	Child artist	Shahadat Hossain Liton	
2010	Top Hero	Child artist	Montazur Rahman Akbar	
2011	Chotto Songsar	Child artist	Montazur Rahman Akbar	
2011	Tor Karone Beche Achi	Child artist	M B Manik	
2012	Shami Bhaggo	Child artist	F I Manik	
2012	The Speed	Child artist	Sohanur Rahman Sohan	
TBA	Jibon Jontrona	Child artist	Zahid Hossain	Unreleased

=== Music video ===
Year	Song	Singer	Starring	Director
2019	"Laal Sobuj" (Cricket Song)	Dinat Jahan Munni, Ayub Shahriar	Symon Sadik, Anisur Rahman Milon, Amin Khan	Ziauddin Alam

== Awards and nominations ==
Year	Award	Category	Film	Result	Ref.
2006	Bangladesh National Film Awards	Best Child Artist	Kabuliwala	Won	
2008	Bangladesh National Film Awards	Best Child Artist	Ek Takar Bou	Won	
2010	Bangladesh National Film Awards	Best Child Artist	Chachchu Amar Chachchu	Won	
2025	BGCF Award	Best Actress (Film)	Jongli	Won	
2026	Dhallywood Film and Music Awards	Best Actress	Priyo Prakton	Won	
