= Kothin Protishodh =

- Movie poster
- Bengali: কঠিন প্রতিশোধ
- Directed by: Nazrul Islam Khan
- Written by: Siva
- Screenplay by: Nazrul Islam Khan
- Story by: Kashem Ali Dulal
- Produced by: Mohammad Golam Morshed
- Starring: Shakib Khan; Apu Biswas; Misha Sawdagor
- Cinematography: Asaduzzaman Majnu
- Edited by: Jinnat Hossain Jinnah
- Music by: Ali Akram Shuvo
- Production company: Shondhani Kothachitro
- Distributed by: Shondhani Kothachitro
- Release date: 6 October 2014
- Running time: 154 minutes
- Country: Bangladesh
- Language: Bengali

Kothin Protishodh (Bengali: কঠিন প্রতিশোধ; transl. Heavy Revenge) is a 2014 Bangladeshi action drama film directed by Nazrul Islam Khan and produced by Mohammad Golam Morshed and Shondhani Kothachitro. The movie features an ensemble cast of Shakib Khan, Apu Biswas, Uzzal, Parvin Sultana Diti, Ali Raj Mizu Ahmed, and Misha Sawdagar.

The soundtrack was composed by Ali Akram Shuvo, cinematography was handled by Asaduzzaman Majnu, and editing was done by Jinnat Hossain Jinnah. The film has previously been titled Moner Thikana.

== Synopsis ==
Badhon Chowdhury (Shakib Khan) is brought up by his uncle (Ali Raj) in Thailand. Dola (Apu Biswas) stays in Thailand along with her uncle. After a few misunderstandings, they fall in love. Dola is forced to come back to her hometown in Dewanganj, Bangladesh. Then Badhon comes in search of her. Meanwhile, Rayhan Chowdhury (Uzzal) and his opponent Jabbar Dewan (Mizu Ahmed) belong to two neighboring villages. They have longtime enmity. The crux of the film is how Badhon and Dola are related to Rayhan Chowdhury and Jabbar Dewan.

== Cast ==
- Shakib Khan as Badhon Chowdhury
- Apu Biswas as Dola
- Uzzal as Rayhan Chowdhury
- Parvin Sultana Diti as Sharmin Chowdhury
- Ali Raj as Hasan
- Mizu Ahmed as Jabbar Dewan
- Misha Sawdagar as Choto Dewan
- Ejajul Islam as James
- Kabila
- Dulari

== Production ==
The film's work initially began with the title Moner Thikana, but was later changed to Kothin Protishodh before release. The shooting of the film was completed in Thailand from September 8 to 19, 2014 and submitted to the censors board for Eid al-Adha release.

== Soundtrack ==
Kothin Protishodh

Soundtrack album by Ali Akram Shuvo
- Released: 2014
- Studio: Shondhani Kothachitro
- Genre: Film soundtrack
- Length: 19:03
- Language: Bengali language
- Label: Tiger Media
- Producer: Ali Akram Shuvo

Ali Akram Shuvo chronology
Shera Nayok (2014)	Kothin Protishodh (2014)	Hitman (2014)

The soundtrack of the film is composed by Ali Akram Shuvo with lyrics written by Moniruzzaman Monir and Kabir Bakul. The songs were sung by Andrew Kishore, Kanak Chapa and Asif Akbar.

Track listing
No.	Title	Lyrics	Singer(s)	Length
1.	"Hello Hello"	Kabir Bakul	S I Tutul	4:25
2.	"Tumi Bhalobasha Amari"	Moniruzzaman Monir	Kumar Biswajit, Kanak Chapa	4:29
3.	"Baba Je Amar"	Moniruzzaman Monir	Andrew Kishore	4:19
4.	"Emon Jodi Hoto"	Kabir Bakul	Andrew Kishore, Kanak Chapa	4:55
5.	"Baba Je Amar" (Sad version)	Moniruzzaman Monir	Andrew Kishore	2:37
Total length:				29:40

== Release and reception ==
The film was released in 42 theaters on October 6, 2014, occurring alongside Eid al-Adha.

=== Reception ===
The film became the third largest commercial success of 2014 with 70% collection at the box office.
