= List of awards and nominations received by Manna =

Manna, was a successful Bangladeshi film actor and producer. In his 24 years career he has acted in more than three hundred films. He earned numerous accolades in his long career, including 1 National Film Award, 3 Meril Prothom Alo Awards, and 5 Bachsas Awards.

He earned a Bangladesh National Film Award for Best Actor for his role in the film Bir Soinik (2003).

== Rewards and honors ==
National Film Award

He was nominated for several National Film Awards but won one.

Years	Film	Category	Results	Sources
1992	Kosto	Best Actor	Nominated	
1999	Ammajan	Best Actor	Nominated	
2003	Bir Soinik	Best Actor	Won	
2004	Uttarer Khep	Best Actor	Nominated	
2006	Kabuliwala	Best Actor	Nominated	

Meril Prothom Alo Award

He was nominated for the Merill-Prothom-alo Award a total of eight times, winning three times.

Years	Film	Category	Results	Sources
1999	Ammajan	Best Actor	Won	
2000	Kosto	Best Actor	Won	
2001	Abbajan	Best Actor	Nominated	
2002	Shami Striri joddo	Best Actor	Nominated	
2003	doi bodu ek shami	Best Actor	Nominated	
2005	Ami jeil theke bolsi	Best Actor	Nominated	
2006	Mayer Morjada	Best Actor	Nominated	
2006	MachineMan	Best Actor	Won	

Bachsas Awards

He has been nominated for several Bacchus Awards, four times for Best Actor and one posthumously for his contribution to the film industry.

Years	Film	Category	Results	Sources
1999	Ammajan	Best Actor	Won	
2001	Abbajan	Best Actor	Won	
2004	Uttarer Khep	Best Actor	Won	
2006	Moner Sathe Joddo	Best Actor	Won	
2006	Special contribution to the film	Special award	Won	

=== Other awards and honors ===
Asian Journalist Human Rights and Cultural Foundation

- 'Winner' : AJHRCF Performance Award 2018 (posthumous)

=== Building naming ===
The video editing, color grading and dubbing studio has been renamed "Manna Digital Complex" in the digital system within the Bangladesh Film Development Corporation for his outstanding contribution to the Bangladesh film industry.
