= Subrata =

Subrota (Hindi/ Sanskrit: सुव्रत, Odia: ସୁବ୍ରତ Bengali: সুব্রত), also Subroto (Read and written as by Bengalis and Javanese) or Subrata/Subrat/Shubrat/Subroto/Suvrat (Read and Written as by Odias), is a common name in India, especially among Oriya and Bengali people and in Indonesia especially among Javanese and Sundanese people. The name is also somewhat common in Indonesia because many people there have Sanskrit derived names there as well (in Java, Subroto is more common due to Javanese spelling structure of changing 'a' into an 'o'. It means "devoted to what is right"). Subroto (Suvrat) is the name of the 20th Jain teerthankara Munisuvrata Nath who was born in Nalanda district. Subrata is also one among the thousands names of the god Vishnu listed in the Vishnu Sahasranama. People bearing the name include :

- Subrata of Magadha, King c. 1210 – 1150 BC
- Subrata Roy, Chairman and Managing Worker, Sahara India Group, India
- Subrata Roy, Inventor, Educator, Scientist - Professor at the University of Florida
- Subroto Bagchi, Chairman of Mindtree
- Subrata Bose, Bengali politician
- Subrata Chowdhury, Tripuran Cricketer
- Gatot Subroto, Former Indonesian military general
- Subroto Ghosh, Indian cricketer
- Subroto Guha, Indian cricketer
- H. Subrata, Indonesian media magnate
- Subrata Mitra, Indian cinematographer
- Subrata Mukherjee, Indian politician
- Subroto Mukerjee, the first Chief of staff of Indian Air Force
- Raden Subroto (politician), Former Secretary General of OPEC and Indonesian administrator
- Subrata Pal, Indian international footballer
- Subrata Sen, Film director
- Subrata (actor), Film Actor
