= Chachchu =

2006 Bangladeshi Bengali-language drama film

- Film poster
- Directed by: F.I. Manik
- Produced by: Dipjol
- Starring: Shakib Khan; Apu Biswas; Dipjol; Sharmili Ahmed; Misha Sawdagor
- Cinematography: SM Azhar
- Edited by: Touhid Hossain Chowdhury
- Music by: Alam Khan
- Production company: Omi Boni Kathachitra
- Distributed by: Omi Boni Kathachitra
- Release date: 25 August 2006
- Country: Bangladesh
- Language: Bengali

Chachchu is a 2006 Bengali-language Bangladeshi drama film directed by F. I. Manik. The film stars Shakib Khan, Apu Biswas, Dipjol, Sharmili Ahmed, Misha Sawdagor and Dighi in the lead role and the film produced by Dipjol. It is the debut choreographed film by Bangladesh National Film Award winner Habibur Rahman. Shakib Khan and Apu Biswas was nominated for Meril-Prothom Alo Awards for Best Actor and Actress.

== Plot ==
Biplob (Shakib Khan) is a determined police officer. The elder officer's daughter Riya Chowdhury (Apu Biswas) falls in love with him. But Biplob's mission is to rescue his niece Jui (Dighi) from the clutches of the hardened criminal Raja Mia (Dipjol).

== Cast ==
- Shakib Khan - Biplob, Jui's uncle
- Apu Biswas - Riya Chowdhury
- Dipjol - Raja Mia "Chachchu"
- Dighi - Jui
- Ali Raj - Asad
- Kumkum
- Sharmili Ahmed - Jui's grandmother
- Misha Sawdagor - Dulu Mirza
- Khalil Ullah Khan - Samad
- Aruna Biswas - Shanti
- Subrata
- Adil
- Don - Fulu Mirza
- Ilias Kobra - Morshed
- Afzal Sharif - Pannu

== Music ==
The music and lyrics of the Chachchu film composed by Alam Khan. Munshi Wadud wrote the lyrics for all the songs in the film. Andrew Kishore, Monir Khan and Kanak Chapa provided the vocals for the songs.

== Nominations ==
Year	Award	Category	Nominee	Result
2007	Meril-Prothom Alo Awards	Best actor	Shakib Khan	Nominated
2007	Meril-Prothom Alo Awards	Best actress	Apu Biswas	Nominated
