= Bojhena Se Bojhena =

Bojhena Se Bojhena (lit. 'Can't Understand') may refer to:

- Bojhena Se Bojhena (TV series), an Indian Bengali-language TV series
- Bojhena Se Bojhena (film), a 2015 Bangladeshi film

== See also ==
- Bojhena Shey Bojhena, a 2012 Indian Bengali-language film
