= Ministry of Love (film project) =

Film series

Ministry of Love is a project by Bangladeshi OTT platform Chorki to produce 12 love movies of 12 film directors. In every film, there will be a shadow of love in the personal life of the makers. Mostofa Sarwar Farooki is the co-producer of the project. Films will be released in Chorki in phases between 2023 and 2024.

On 3 August 2023, at a ceremony at a hotel in Dhaka, the 12 producers shared details about their films. The film directors are Mostofa Sarwar Farooki, Robiul Alam Robi, Shihab Shaheen, Redoan Rony, Ashfaque Nipun, Abu Shahed Emon, Raihan Rafi, Raka Noshin Nawar, Shankha Dasgupta, Arifur Rahman, Rezaur Rahman and Anam Biswas.

== Project films ==
Mostofa Sarwar Farooki will produce two films, Raka Noshin Nawar and Shankha Dasgupta will produce one film each and other directors will produce 12 films.

List of Films
Date	Film title	Director	Lead Actor(s)	Ref.
30 November 2023	Something Like an Autobiography	Mostofa Sarwar Farooki	Mostofa Sarwar Farooki, Nusrat Imrose Tisha	
10 April 2024	The Last Defenders of Monogamy	Mostofa Sarwar Farooki	Chanchal Chowdhury, Xefer Rahman	
22 February 2024	Kacher Manush Dure Thuiya	Shihab Shaheen	Pritom Hasan, Tasnia Farin	
5 September 2024	Forget Me Not	Robiul Alam Robi	Mehazabien Chowdhury, Yash Rohan, Bijori Barkatullah	
8 November 2024	36 24 36	Rezaur Rahman	Prarthana Fardin Dighi, Syed Zaman Shawon, Karina Kaiser	
11 December 2025	Dimlight	Saraf Ahmed Zibon	Mosharraf Karim, Tanzika Amin	
8 October 2026	Happily Married	Jahid Preetom	Arifin Shuvoo, Keya Payel	
To be announced	Uki	Redoan Rony		
To be announced	We Need to Talk	Ashfaque Nipun		
To be announced	Avani	Abu Shahed Emon		
To be announced	Mohabbat	Raihan Rafi		
To be announced	Fifty Fifty	Shankha Dasgupta, Raka Noshin Nawar		
To be announced	Jui	Arifur Rahman		
To be announced	Shoulder Man	Anam Biswas		

== Something Like an Autobiography ==
Something Like an Autobiography is a 2023 Bengali-language Bangladeshi romantic film. Produced by Redoan Rony, the film is directed by Mostofa Sarwar Farooki. The film is co-produced by Anna Katchko, former head of Film Bazaar Nina Lath, Nusrat Imroz Tisha. Farooki and Nusrat Imroz Tisha jointly wrote the screenplay. Pavel Orin is directing the music. It was released in Chorki on 30 November 2023.

== Kacher Manush Dure Thuiya ==
Directed by Shihab Shaheen, the second film of the Ministry of Love is Kacher Manush Dure Thuiya was released on 22 February 2024. Pritam Hasan and Tasnia Farin are playing the lead roles. Shihab Shaheen and Jahan Sultana jointly wrote the screenplay. Music directed by Emon Chowdhury.

== Last Defenders of Monogamy ==
Last Defenders of Monogamy is a 2024 Bengali language Bangladeshi romantic drama web movie. It was directed by Mostofa Sarwar Farooki. Chanchal Chowdhury and Xeffer Rahman played the lead roles. With this, Xeffer made her film debut. The third film of Chorki's Ministry of Love project, which was released on 10 April 2024 in Chorki.

== Forget Me Not ==
Forget Me Not is a 2024 Bengali-language Bangladeshi romantic psychological drama film. Robiul Alam Robi wrote the screenplay and dialogues along with the direction. Starring Yash Rohan and Mehazabien Chowdhury in the lead roles. This is Ministry of Love's 4th film, which was released on OTT Chorki on 5 September 2024.

== 36 24 36 ==
36 24 36 is a Bengali language Bangladeshi romantic comedy film. Rezaur Rahman is the direction the film. Starring Prarthana Fardin Dighi, Syed Zaman Shawon and Karina Kaiser. It is 5th film of the Ministry of Love film project and it was theatrically released on 8 November 2024 on big screen.
