= Koshto =

Koshto may refer to:

- Koshto (album), a 1995 album byAyub Bachchu
- Koshto (film), a 2000 Bangladeshi film
