= Jongli =

- Poster
- Directed by: M. Raahim
- Screenplay by: Sukriti Saha; Mehedi Hasan Moon
- Story by: Azad Khan
- Starring: Siam Ahmed; Shobnom Bubly; Prarthana Fardin Dighi; Azwad Bhuiyan
- Cinematography: Ripon Chowdhury
- Edited by: Md. Kalam
- Music by: Prince Mahmud
- Production companies: MIB Studio; Tiger Media
- Distributed by: The Abhi Kathachitra
- Release date: March 31, 2025
- Running time: 152 Minutes
- Country: Bangladesh
- Language: Bengali
- Budget: ৳2 – ৳2.05 crore
- Box office: ৳10.22 crore

Jongli (Bengali: জংলি; transl. Wild) is a 2025 Bangladeshi action thriller film directed by M. Raahim. The film features in lead role Siam Ahmed, Shobnom Bubly and Prarthana Fardin Dighi.

It is the final film of veteran Bangladeshi actress Gulshan Ara Ahmed. The film was released on March 31, 2025, coinciding with Eid al-Fitr. It received positive reviews from critics and became a commercial success. With an approximate grosse of over ৳10 crore,Jongli currently stands as one of the highest grossing Bangladeshi film of all time as well as fifth highest grossing Bangladeshi film of 2025.

== Synopsis ==
Johnny studies at the university. He has a bad reputation for fighting at the university. His father is a teacher at the same university. Considering that, he is repeatedly exempted. However, behind Johnny's reckless behavior is the distance with his father. His father blames him for his mother's death in an accident. Johnny loves Nupur, who is studying at his university. He wants to live a new life by clinging to her. But Vidhi is gone! One day, the relationship takes an unexpected turn. Leaving everything behind, he goes out, becoming a true 'Jongli(lit. 'Wilderness')', someone who nothing can touch anymore. A little girl, Pakhi, flies into the life of that Jongli. But the Jongli doesn't want Pakhi in her life. Can Pakhi finally change the mind of the Jongli? Or will the Jongli remain a Jongli?

== Plot ==
The movie starts in a hospital at night. A girl named Liza gives birth to an illegitimate child and decides to throw the baby in the dustbin behind the hospital. As she is about to do it, she is caught by Dr. Tithi (Bubly), the same doctor who delivered her baby. Tithi brings her back to the hospital and starts telling her a story to stop her from making that mistake. That story is the main film.

Past :- Johnny (Siam Ahmed as Mehedi Hassan Johnny) studies at a university. He has a bad reputation for fighting. His father is a teacher at the same university, so he is saved every time. Behind his anger is a painful reason. His father blames Johnny for his mother's death in an accident. Because of this, their father-son relationship is completely broken. Johnny feels that no one loves him. He loves Nupur (Dighi), his university girlfriend, and wants to leave his reckless life and start fresh with her.

But Nupur cheats on him and leaves him to marry someone else. This is the final blow for him. His mother is dead, his father hates him, and his girlfriend has betrayed him. Johnny leaves everything, including his university, family, and city. He becomes Jongli, which means wilderness. He becomes a man who lives alone like an animal and whom nothing can touch anymore.

Then, a little six-year-old orphaned girl named Pakhi (Noireta) becomes a part of Jongli's life.

At first, Jongli does not want her. He says, "Tumi o tariye dibe na toh Jongli?" He pushes her away. But Pakhi is stubborn. She starts calling him Baba. She brings him food and sleeps near him. Slowly, this angry man starts to soften. He starts protecting her like his own daughter.

During this time, he meets Dr. Tithi (Bubly). She is an intern doctor. She sees the good heart inside Jongli. She helps him when Pakhi gets sick. Gradually, Johnny and Tithi fall in love. Later, Tithi becomes his wife.

For the first time, Johnny feels that he has a family, with Pakhi as his daughter and Tithi as his wife. But his past does not leave him. His enemies, including Nupur's people and the university gang, come back. They try to take Pakhi away. In the end, a final action fight happens to save Pakhi.

Present :- The story is finished being told by Tithi to Liza in the hospital. Liza is asked by Tithi, "If love for a child who is not even his own blood can be learned by this Jongli, who lost everything, then why is your own blood being thrown away by you?" After hearing this, Liza is overcome with emotion and her baby is taken back by her.

Then it is seen that a happy small family is now being lived in by Johnny, Tithi, and Pakhi. Redemption is finally chosen by Johnny over forever remaining as a Jongli.

== Cast ==
- Siam Ahmed as Mehedi Hassan Johnny aka Jongli
- Shabnom Bubly as Doctor Tithi, An intern doctor and later Johnny's wife
- Prarthana Fardin Dighi as Nupur, Johnny's ex-girlfriend
- Noireta Hasan Rudromoyee as Pakhi
- Shahiduzzaman Selim as Barrister Sharafat Chowdhury, A senior lawyer
- Dilara Zaman as tithi's grandmother
- Subrata as tithi's father
- Rashed Mamun Apu as Sujon Shah, Viral BD journalist
- Sohel Khan
- Arfan Mredha Shiblu
- Gulshan Ara Ahmed as Tithi's mother

== Production ==
There were rumors that either Tama Mirza or Shobnom Bubly would be the film's lead actress. However, Prothom Alo confirmed that Bubly will play as the lead actress, which was confirmed following a look revealed on April 24, 2024. Prarthana Fardin Dighi will play an important role in the film.

Siam Ahmed portrays a rugged character, adopting a distinctive appearance with unkempt hair, a full beard, and traditional attire, marking a significant departure from his previous roles. To fully immerse himself in the character, he refrained from cutting his hair and beard for approximately seven months.

The film's filming began on April 21, 2024, in Mohammadpur, Dhaka.

== Music ==
Jongli

Soundtrack album by Prince Mahmud
- Studio: Tiger Media
- Label: Tiger Media
- Producer: Prince Mahmud

Prince Mahmud chronology
Rajkumar (2024)	Jongli (2025)	TBA (TBA)

Singles from Jongli
- 1. "Jonom Jonom" Released: February 12, 2025; 2. "Bondhugo Shono" Released: March 21, 2025

The film's soundtrack is composed by veteran musician Prince Mahmud, who previously work in Himel Ashraf's Rajkumar (2024), which received widespread acclaimed. The film's feature four songs, all of which have been composed and arranged by him. The songs will be released as an album, marking his first album release since 2016. The first single from the soundtrack was released on February 12, 2025, coinciding with Valentine's Day. The song is written and composed by Prince Mahmud, featuring renowned singer Tahsan Rahman Khan with Atiya Anisha, marking their playback debut in films. The music arrangement has been done by Imran Mahmudul. The second single was released on the 21st of the following month, featuring Imran Mahmudul and Dilshad Nahar Kona.

Tracklist
No.	Title	Lyrics	Music	Singer(s)	Length
1.	"Jonom Jonom"	Prince Mahmud	Imran Mahmudul and Prince Mahmud	Tahsan Rahman Khan and Atiya Anisha	3:47
2.	"Bondhugo Shono"			Imran Mahmudul and Dilshad Nahar Kona	3:42
3.	"Maya Pakhi"	Prince Mahmud	Prince Mahmud	Mahtim Shakib	2:44
4.	"Jodi Alo Asto"	Prince Mahmud	Prince Mahmud	Habib Wahid	3:25
5.	"Baba Tomay Chara"	Somnath Kaur; Mehedi Hassan Moon	Avishek Saha	Koushiki Sen, Krishnendu	3:40
6.	"Nantu Ghotok 2.0" (Remix: Apirus, main lyrics and music: Arman Khan)			Roksana Rupsa	2:13

== Marketing ==
The first look of the film was released on March 29, 2024, coinciding Siam Ahmed's birthday. Another look was revealed on January 9, 2025. A pre-teaser was revealed on February 22, 2025 and a 1-minute 30-seconds teaser was released on March 13.

== Release ==
Initially it was announced that the film would be released on Eid al-Adha in March 2024. However, the release was postponed due to Cyclone Remal. The release was later rescheduled for September, but due to the July Revolution, it was delayed again. Finally, a new release date was set for Eid al-Fitr 2025 in the country, with a global release scheduled for April 25, 2025.

== Box office ==
The film grossed ৳2.06 crore (US$170,000), which confirmed by director M. Raahim with a Facebook post dated 16 April 2025. It is grossed ৳3.13 crore (US$260,000) following 23 days of theatrical run. After 26 days, the film's total multiplex gross collection amounted to BDT 23.1 million, as confirmed by the director.

== Awards ==
Year	Award	Category	Result	Ref.
2026	Meril-Prothom Alo Awards	Best Film	Nominated	
