= Top Hero (2010 film) =

2010 Bangladeshi film directed by Montazur Rahman Akbar

- Film poster
- Directed by: Montazur Rahman Akbar
- Written by: Komol Sarkar (dialogue)
- Screenplay by: Komol Sarkar
- Produced by: Montazur Rahman Akbar
- Starring: Shakib Khan; Apu Biswas; Prabir Mitra; Misha Sawdagor
- Cinematography: Istofa Rahman
- Edited by: Touhid Hossain Chowdhury
- Music by: Kabir Bakul; Alam Shah; Jahidul Hasan
- Production company: Star Plus
- Distributed by: Star Plus
- Release date: 9 October 2010
- Running time: 160 minutes
- Country: Bangladesh
- Language: Bengali

Top Hero is a 2010 Bangladeshi vigilante political action thriller film written and directed by Montazur Rahman Akbar, he also produced the film under the banner Star Plus. It features Shakib Khan and Apu Biswas in the lead roles.

== Plot ==
Hero's (Shakib Khan) father was murdered in a hijacking incident. His sister could not bear the grief and commits suicide. Now Hero wants to punish the people who were responsible for his loss. So he files a police report, but the police take no actions. Finally, Hero takes matters to his own hands.

== Cast ==
- Shakib Khan as Haroon a.k.a. Hero
- Apu Biswas as Kahini
- Prabir Mitra as Sir
- Misha Sawdagor as Badsha
- Michael
- Rehana Jolly
- Rebeka Rouf
- Prarthana Fardin Dighi
- Zillur Rahman
- Raju Sarkar
- Shiba Shanu
- Kabila as Kabila
- Nasrin
- Sagor Shikder
- Jahidul Hasan

== Soundtrack ==
Track Listings
No.	Title	Lyrics	Music	Singer(s)	Length
1.	"Bhalobashar Prithibi Ta"	Kabir Bakul	Emon Saha	Andrew Kishore, Samina Chowdhury
2.	"Afsana Afsana"	Kabir Bakul	Faisal Alam Dihan	Monir Khan
3.	"Bhabi Amar Bhabi"	Alam Shah	Alam Shah	Rizia Parveen
4.	"Morle Bondhu Mathi Hobo"	Faysal Rabbikin	Kabir Bokul	Pulal Adhikary
5.	"Rangila Bou"	Alam Shah	Alam Shah	Alam Shah, Rizia Parveen
