= Dipjol =

Bangladeshi actor (born 1962)

- ডিপজল
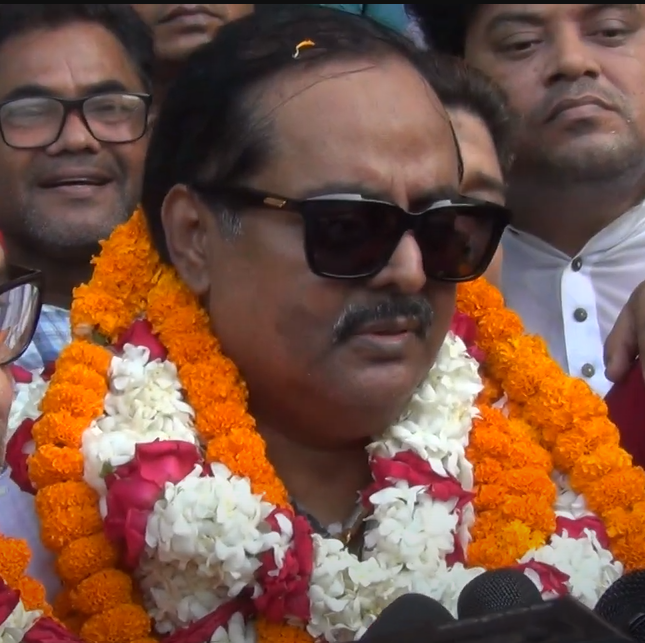
- Dipjol in 2024
- Born: Monowar Hossain Dipjol; April 6, 1962 (age 64); Mirpur, Dhaka, East Pakistan
- Other name: Bishu
- Years active: 1993–present
- Political party: Bangladesh Nationalist Party (1991–2007); Bangladesh Awami League (2009–2024)
- Spouse: Rumana Monowar

Monowar Hossain Dipjol (Bengali: মনোয়ার হোসেন ডিপজল; born 6 April 1962) known by his stage name as Dipjol, is a Bangladeshi actor, businessman, producer, and activist. businessman, and politician. He is the former general secretary of the Bangladesh Film Artistes Association.

Widely regarded as one of the greatest villains in Dhallywood, he first started his career as a hero but was unsuccessful. Later, in the mid 1990's, he reemerged as a leading negative character in the film industry. His notable films as a negative character include Teji, Dhar, Ammajan, Koshto, Kukkhato Khuni, Bortoman, Dhakaiya Mastan, Kothin Shimar, Bhaier Shotru Bhai, Major Shaheb, Swami Strir Juddho, Ali Baba, Bostir Rani Suriya, Itihas, Bipodjonok, Mogher Mullok, Bhoyonker Bishu, Khepa Basu and Dhawa.

== Career ==
Dipjol is a Dhallywood film actor. In the mid 2000's, he resurged his career as a lead hero with blockbuster high grossing films such as Koti Takar Kabin, Chachchu, Mayer Hate Behester, Chabi and Dadima. He also owns Dipjol Food Industries Limited. He is best known for his style of dialogue and action. He was also BNP politician and ward councillor of Dhaka City Corporation ward No.9 in 1994 to 2007.

Along with his acting career, he was also successful in producing high budget films, many of which became blockbusters and high grossing films. This established him as a successful producer and engaged him in various organizations, businesses, wards, and other enterprises. He is also known for his involvement in various humanitarian work such as gifting buses for largest religious congestion in the country Bishwa Ijtema or giving huge sums of money during floods.

On 28 January 2022, Dipjol became a vice-president of the Bangladesh Film Artistes Association after bagging 219 votes. In April 2024, Dipjol was elected General secretary of this association.

== Legal issues ==
He was sentenced to jail in 2007 on an arms charge. He was later convicted of numerous charges, including amassing and concealing illegal wealth, and was given a 41-year term. According to an investigation by a team of the Jail Directorate led by Commander M Zakaria Khan, Deputy Inspector General of Prisons Shamsul Haider Siddique was found guilty of violating 15 codes of the jail in February 2009. He was found favoring convict Monowar Hossain Dipjol in prison and giving him special privileges, such as allowing 200 visitors for Dipjol in 52 days. He was released after securing his bail from the Bangladesh High Court on 1 June 2009.

== Personal life ==
Dipjol is married to Rumana Monowar.

=== Health issues ===
In September 2017, he fell ill and, after being taken to hospital, was diagnosed as having had a heart attack and suffering from water on the lungs. He underwent heart surgery at Elizabeth Hospital in Singapore.

== Filmography ==
Year	Film	Role	Notes	Ref.
1987	Soti Komola			
1993	Takar Pahar		Also producer	
1995	Kata Rifle	Jummon	Also producer	
1998	Teji	Bishu	Also story writer	
1999	Moger Mulluk			
1999	Ammajan	Kalam	Also story writer and producer	
1999	Bhoyonkor Bishu	Bishu	Also producer	
1999	Ke Amar Baba		Also producer	
1999	Dhor			
2000	Kukkhato Khuni	Torofdar		
2000	Golam	Tiger		
2000	Koshto	Sonamia		
2000	Hira Chuni Panna	Moharani / Dragon Aslam		
2000	Ajker Kedar			
2000	Dhawa	Pagla Matin		
2000	Bortoman			
2000	Dushmon Dorodi			
2000	Janer Jaan			
2000	Gunda Number One	Police Officer Mokarram		
2000	Tero Panda Ek Gunda		Also story writer and producer	
2000	Jinda Dafon			
2000	Sabdhan			
2000	Tumi Je Amar			
2000	Londo Vondo			
2001	Shikari	Dayaban		
2001	Kothin Bastob	Bokkor		
2001	Bhoyonkor Sontrashi			
2001	Thekao Mastan	Dipu Sardar		
2001	Chairman			
2001	Kata Lash			
2001	Kothin Shasti			
2001	Panja			
2001	Gono Dushmon		Also story writer and producer	
2001	Kodom Ali Mastan			
2002	Boma Hamla			
2002	Nayok			
2002	Khepa Basu	Basu		
2002	Bhoyonkor Porinam			
2002	Dhakaiya Mastan	Billal Mishouri	Also story writer and producer	
2002	Bipodjonok			
2002	Major Shaheb			
2002	Itihas	Sobhan		
2002	Dolopoti		Also story writer and producer	
2003	Mon	Doyal Dada		
2003	Kothin Shimar	Akram	Also story writer and producer	
2003	Nater Guru			
2003	Bouer Somman	Dhakaiya Mamun		
2003	Chai Khomota			
2004	Boro Malik		Also story writer and producer	
2004	Bostir Rani Suriya		Also story writer and producer	
2004	Bhaier Shotru Bhai	Bitla Bishu / Bishal Chowdhury	Also story writer and producer	
2005	Kala Manik	Kala Manik		
2005	Badha	Abbas	Also story writer and producer	
2006	Vondo Ojha	Dengue Ojha		
2006	Koti Takar Kabin	Sultan Talukder	Also story writer and producer	
2006	Pitar Ason	Tipu Sardar	Also story writer and producer	
2006	Chachchu	Raja Mia / Chachchu	Also story writer and producer	
2006	Dadima	Sultan Khan	Also story writer and producer	
2009	Lattu Koshai			
2009	Mayer Hate Behester Chabi	Lakhpoti	Also story writer and producer	
2009	Kajer Manush	Kaju / Kajer Manush	Also story writer and producer	
2010	Mayer Chokh	Jibon	Also story writer and producer	
2010	Amar Swapno Amar Songshar	Sultan	Also story writer and producer	
2010	Zamidar	Murad	Also story writer and producer	
2010	Rickshawalar Chele	Rustom	Also story writer and producer	
2010	Ek Joban	Sultan	Also story writer and producer	
2011	Chotto Songsar	Sultan	Also story writer and producer	
2011	Goriber Bhai			
2011	Amar Prithibi Tumi	Sultan		
2011	Ongko	Sultan	Also story writer and producer	
2012	Swami Bhaggo	Sultan		
2012	Manik Ratan Dui Bhai	Manik	Also story writer and producer	
2012	Bazarer Coolie		Also story writer	
2016	Onek Dame Kena	Imrose Mirza		
2017	Dulabhai Zindabad	Sultan / Dulabhai		
2021	Souvaggo	Souvaggo	Also producer	
2021	E Desh Tomar Amar		Also producer	
2022	Banglar Hercules		Also producer	
2022	Jemon Jamai Temon Bou		Also producer	
2022	Ghar Bhanga Songshar	Sultan	Also producer	
2022	Aakrosh		Also producer	
2023	Something Like an Autobiography	Himself	Special appearance	
2024	Omanush Holo Manush	Abul	Also producer	
2024	Jimmi		Also producer and director	

=== Web series ===
Year	Title	OTT	Character	Director	Notes
2023	Kabadi	Bioscope	Mathakata Roton	Rubayet Mahmud	
