= Dhakaiya Mastan =

- Dhakaiya Mastan film poster
- Directed by: Montazur Rahman Akbar
- Screenplay by: Montazur Rahman Akbar
- Story by: Dipjol
- Based on: Farz (Hindi film) by Raj Kanwar
- Produced by: Dipjol
- Starring: Manna; Moushumi; Dipjol
- Production company: Omi Boni Kothchitro
- Distributed by: Omi Boni Kothchitro
- Release date: 2002
- Country: Bangladesh
- Language: Bengali

Dhakaiya Mastan is a 2002 Bangladeshi film starring Manna and Moushumi. The film was directed by Montazur Rahman Akbar. It also co-stars Misha Sawdagar and Dipjol. It was a remake of 2001 Hindi film Farz which starred Sunny Deol and Preity Zinta.

== Cast ==
- Manna
- Moushumi
- Dipjol - Billal Mishouri
- Shahin Alam
- Dolly Johur
- Nasir Khan
- Ilias Kobra
- Habibur Rahman Modhu
- Moiyuri
- Razzak
- Misha Sawdagor
