= Panku Jamai =

- Poster
- Bengali: পাংকু জামাই
- Directed by: Abdul Mannan
- Screenplay by: Abdul Mannan
- Story by: Abdul Mannan
- Produced by: Mozammel Haque Sarkar
- Starring: Shakib Khan; Apu Biswas; Misha Sawdagor; ATM Shamsuzzaman
- Cinematography: Asaduzzaman Mojnu
- Edited by: Touhid Hossain Chowdhury
- Music by: Ali Akram Shuvo; Emon Saha; Debendranath Chatterjee; Background music AR Bablu
- Production company: Bhawal Pictures
- Distributed by: Bhawal Pictures; Live Technologies Ltd.
- Release date: June 16, 2018
- Country: Bangladesh
- Language: Bengali

Panku Jamai (Bengali: পাংকু জামাই, transl. Stylish Son-in-law) is a 2018 Bangladeshi comedy drama film. The film was directed by Abdul Mannan and produced by Mozammel Haque Sarkar under the banner of Bhawal Pictures. It features Shakib Khan and Apu Biswas in the lead roles, and is their last film as a duo. Panku Jamai also features actors Misha Sawdagor, Puspita Popy and ATM Shamsuzzaman.

== Synopsis ==
Akash Chowdhury (Shakib Khan) belongs to a poor family, but he wants to marry Nupur (Apu Biswas), the daughter of a rich family. However, Hormuz Ali (Misha Sawdagor) also wants to marry Nupur. The two rival candidates for son-in-law compete for the approval of the Nupur's father by dressing stylishly.

== Cast ==
- Shakib Khan as "Akash" Chowdhury / "Panku" Jamai
- Apu Biswas as Nusrat Jahan "Nupur"
- Misha Sawdagor as Hormuz Ali
- Puspita Popy as Puspita
- ATM Shamsuzzaman as Nupur's grandpa
- Dulari Chakroborthy as Nupur's grandma
- Rebecca Rouf as Nupur's mother
- Sadek Bachchu as Dealer Bachchu, Pushpita's father
- Shiba Shanu as Siraj, a union parishad chairman
- Khaleda Akter Kolpona as herself; Akash Chowdhury's mother
- Kabila as Abdul Ali Mokami, a police official; Nupur's maternal uncle
- Kala Aziz as Akhtar Ali, a matchmaker (special appearance)
- Jadu Azad

== Production ==
Production of the film began on February 2, 2016, with a Muharat that was held at the 4th floor of Bangladesh Film Development Corporation (BFDC). It was the first time the director and Shakib Khan have worked together. The film's story was written by Abdul Mannan, about this he said, "I'm making this film with a completely original story, I've not followed any shade or story of any other film here. I've written the story myself, so I'm confident that I can present a good film to the audience."

== Soundtrack ==
Panku Jamai

Soundtrack album by Emon Saha, Ali Akram Shuvo and Debendranath Chattopadhyay
- Released: 2018
- Studio: Bhawal Pictures
- Genre: Film soundtrack
- Length: 11:58
- Language: Bengali language
- Label: Live Tech
- Producers: Emon Saha, Ali Akram Shuvo and Debendranath Chattopadhyay

Singles from Panku Jamai
- 1. "Alta Dudhe" Released: June 10, 2018; 2. "Panku Jamai" Released: June 13, 2018; 3. "Tumi Rahman" Released: June 14, 2018

Emon Saha chronology
Panku Jamai (2018)

Ali Akram Shuvo chronology
Panku Jamai (2018)

Debendranath Chattopadhyay chronology
Panku Jamai (2018)

The film's soundtrack was composed by Emon Saha, Ali Akram Shuvo and Debendranath Chattopadhyay with background music by AR Bablu. The film's songs are sung by Runa Laila, Andrew Kishore, Monir Khan, Rizia Parveen, Kanak Chapa, and S.I. Tutul.

Track listing
No.	Title	Lyrics	Music	Singer(s)	Length
1.	"Alta Dudhey"	Sudeep Kumar Dip	Ali Akram Shuvo	Andrew Kishore, Kanak Chapa	3:24
2.	"Panku Jamai"	Sudeep Kumar Dip	Ali Akram Shuvo	Imran Mahmudul, Tanjina Rupa	3:47
3.	"Tumi Rahman"				4:47
Total length:					11:58

== Release ==
Panku Jamai was released in 50 theaters across Bangladesh on June 16, 2018, on the occasion of Eid al-Fitr. It was released in India on May 12, 2023, coinciding with the release of Indian film Pathaan in Bangladesh, under the SAFTA agreement.

== Reception ==
National award-winning director Chatku Ahmed noted that the film's name was inconsistent with the story, however, he praised Shakib Khan's performance, referring to Khan as "the soul of Bangladeshi cinema".
