= Something Like an Autobiography (film) =

2023 film by Mostafa Sarwar Farooki

- Poster
- Directed by: Mostofa Sarwar Farooki
- Written by: Mostofa Sarwar Farooki, Nusrat Imrose Tisha
- Screenplay by: Mostofa Sarwar Farooki; Nusrat Imrose Tisha
- Starring: Mostofa Sarwar Farooki; Nusrat Imrose Tisha
- Distributed by: Chorki
- Release date: 8 October 2023 (BIFF)
- Running time: 82 minutes
- Country: Bangladesh
- Language: Bengali

Something Like an Autobiography is a 2023 Bangladeshi film directed by Mostofa Sarwar Farooki. It was part of the Ministry of Love 12-film anthology film series for Bangladeshi streaming platform Chorki. The title of the film, borrowed from Akira Kurosawa's book of same name, resonates with events that question the boundary between reality and fiction from the plot that is presumed by Variety to be inspired from Farooki and his wife Nusrat Imrose Tisha's personal lives. The film was produced by Redoan Rony and co-produced by Anna Katchko, former Film Bazaar chief Nina Lath, Nusrat Imrose Tisha and Farooki. It was co-written by Farooki and Tisha. It marked Farooki's on-screen debut. The film used Sync sound technique and the Film mixing engineer of this film is Silajit Chakraborty .

Something Like an Autobiography completed and had its world premiere at the 'Kim Jiseok' section of the 28th Busan International Film Festival on 8 October 2023.

== Cast ==
- Mostofa Sarwar Farooki as Farhan
- Nusrat Imrose Tisha as Tithi
- Dolly Johur as Herself, special appearance
- Dipjol as Himself, special appearance

== Release ==
It had its premiere at the 28th Busan International Film Festival in 'Kim Ji-seok' section on 8 October 2023, and compete for the award.

== Award ==
Year	Award	Winner	Category	Film	Results
2024	Meril-Prothom Alo Awards - 2023	Nusrat Imrose Tisha	Best film actress	Something Like an Autobiography	Won
