= Age Jodi Jantam Tui Hobi Por =

Bangladeshi romantic action film

- Film poster
- Directed by: Montazur Rahman Akbar
- Written by: Montazur Rahman Akbar
- Produced by: Montazur Rahman Akbar
- Starring: Anik Rahman Obhi; Pushpita Popy; Ariyan Shah
- Cinematography: Istofa Rahman
- Edited by: Md: Shahidul Hoque
- Music by: Kabir Bakul; Sudip Kumar Dip; Kazi Jamal
- Distributed by: Star Plus
- Release date: 29 August 2014 (Bangladesh)
- Running time: 140 Minutes
- Country: Bangladesh
- Language: Bengali

Age Jodi Jantam Tui Hobi Por (Bengali: আগে যদি জানতাম তুই হবি পর) is a Bangladeshi romantic action film directed by Montazur Rahman Akbar and produced and distributed by Star Plus. It features actors Anik Rahman Obhi, Pushpita Popy, and Ariyan Shah in lead roles. It was released on 29 August 2014 in Bangladesh.

== Plot ==
The film is mainly based on the rural background. This movie contains a triangular romance between a young woman and two young men.

== Cast ==
Sources:

- Anik Rahman Obhi as Nayan
- Pushpita Popy as Sokhi
- Ariyan Shah as Manik
- Kotha as Doli
- Mojammel Hoque as Police OC
- Boby as Munshi
- Tonu Pandey as Arman
- Rex Jafor as Biddut
- Shahin as compounder
- Badol as Jhontu
- Prabir Mitro as Sokhi's father
- Miju Ahmed as Joardar
- Borda Mithu as Talukdar
- Kiron Puri as Montu
