= Forget Me Not (2024 film) =

2024 Bangladeshi drama film

- Directed by: Robiul Alam Robi
- Screenplay by: Al-Amin Hasan Nirjhor; Robiul Alam Robi
- Story by: Al-Amin Hasan Nirjhor; Robiul Alam Robi
- Produced by: Redoan Rony
- Starring: Yash Rohan; Mehjabin Chowdhury
- Cinematography: Ishtiaque Hossain Pablo
- Edited by: Saleh Sobhan Aneem
- Music by: Rashid Sharif Shoyeb
- Production company: Chobiyal
- Distributed by: Chorki
- Release date: 5 September 2024
- Running time: 89 minutes
- Country: Bangladesh
- Language: Bengali

Forget Me Not is a 2024 Bengali-language Bangladeshi romantic psychological drama film. Robiul Alam Robi wrote the screenplay and dialogues along with the direction. Starring Yash Rohan and Mehazabien Chowdhury in the lead roles. This is Ministry of Love's 4th film, which was released on OTT Chorki on 5 September 2024.

== Synopsis ==
University student Fahim suicide attempt after the lover Orthi wants to understand, how much was his responsibility? On the other hand, the mother understands how many things are unknown about her son. Two women find different meanings of love while their loved ones are in mourning.

== Cast ==
- Mehazabien Chowdhury as Aurthi
- Yash Rohan as Fahim
- Bijori Barkatullah as Fahmida
- Irfan Sajjad as Murtoja

== Production ==
On 3 August 2023, Forget Me Not was announced as the fourth film of Chorki's Ministry of Love film projects.

On the night of 29 August 2024, the release date was announced by publishing a poster on Chorki's verified Facebook page. The film's trailer was released on Chorki's Facebook and YouTube channels on the night of 2 September 2024.

== Music ==
Forget Me Not

Soundtrack album by Rashed Sharif Soyeb
- Released: 3 September 2024
- Genre: Film score
- Length: 8:47

The song "Fahim O Orthi" was released on YouTube on 3 September 2024. Abdul Majeed Arakani was the singer and lyricist of the song arranged by Mandolin-Liaqat Ali. The second song "Kamne Ki" was released on 4 September. Rabiul Alam composed the music in Rabi's notation and Ahmed Hasan Sani wrote the lyrics.

The movie was released on the OTT platform Chorki on 5 September 2024 at 8 PM.
