= Lal Sobujer Sur =

2016 film

- Movie poster
- Bengali: লাল সবুজের সুর
- Directed by: Mushfikur Rahman Guljar
- Written by: Faridur Reza Sagar
- Produced by: Faridur Reza Sagar
- Starring: Subrata Barua; Jhuna Chowdhury; Rafiqullah Selim; Omar Sani; Shera Zaman
- Release date: 16 December 2016
- Running time: 146 minutes
- Country: Bangladesh
- Language: Bengali

Lal Sobujer Sur is a 2016 Bangladeshi film directed by Mushfikur Rahman Guljar and starring Subrata Barua, Jhuna Chowdhury, Rafiqullah Selim, Shera Zaman and Omar Sani. The screenplay by Faridur Reza Sagar is based on his novel of the same name. Sagar also produced the film. The film was set in 1971 during the Bangladesh liberation war. It was released on 16 December 2016.

== Cast ==
- Subrata Barua
- Jhuna Chowdhury
- Rafiqullah Selim
- Omar Sani
- Shera Zaman
