= Ivan Shahriar =

- ইভান শাহরিয়ার
- Occupations: Choreographer, dancer
- Awards: National Film Award

Ivan Shahriar is a Bangladeshi choreographer. He won the Bangladesh National Film Award for Best Dance Director for the film Dhat Teri Ki (2017).

== Career ==
Shahriar leads a dance troupe called Sohag Dance Group and is the chairman of an advertising agency Exposure BD.

On 12 September 2020, Shahriar was arrested in the Niketon area of Dhaka for his alleged involvement in sex trafficking to Dubai. According to the CID officials, Shahriar and two other members of a human trafficking ring that forced young women into prostitution in Dubai after trafficking them as tourists.

== Award ==
Shahriar won the National Film Award for Best Choreography for Dhat Teri Ki (2017).
