= Doyel (actress) =

Bangladeshi film actress

- দোয়েল
- Born: Ifte Ara Dalia Doyel; September 25, 1966; Bikrampur, Dhaka
- Died: December 29, 2011 (age 45); Dhaka, Bangladesh
- Occupation: Film actress
- Years active: 1984–2011
- Spouse: Subrata (m. 1988)
- Children: Dighi

Ifte Ara Dalia (25 September 1966 – 29 December 2011) better known as Doyel, was an actress in the film industry of Bangladesh. In 1984, she debuted in her first film Chandranath. She has acted in almost 100 Bangladeshi films.

== Personal life ==
Doyel made her debut as a heroine in the 1980s by acting in the film Chandranath directed by the famous filmmaker Chashi Nazrul Islam. Nayok Raj Razzak plays opposite role in the film. Doyel was married to Subrata Barua in 1988. They have two children, Antor and popular child actress Prarthana Fardin Dighi.

== Films ==
- Chandranath
- Hishab-Nikash
- Aaj Tomar Kal Amar
- Prem Kahini
- Bikrom
- Lokkhi Bodhu
- Ogo Bideshini
- Ghomta
- Kabuliwala

== Death ==
Doyel was diagnosed with cerebral hemorrhage in 2009. She was immediately admitted to the Square Hospital, Dhaka. Her physical condition has not improved since then. In the last one month, three hospitals have to be changed for treatment. Finally she died on 29 December 2011 after a long illness.
