= Puspita Popy =

Bangladeshi actress

- Born: Tania Sultana Popy; Chandpur, Bangladesh
- Occupation: Model Actress
- Years active: 2014–2019
- Notable work: Age Jodi Jantam Tui Hobi Por
- Father: Nurul Hoque

Tania Sultana Popy (professionally, Puspita Popy) is a Bangladeshi actress. She appeared in six Dhallywood films before quitting for conservative Islamic issues.

== Early life ==
Popy was born in the village of Nishchintapur in West Hatila union of Hajiganj thana of Chandpur district. She spent her childhood in the village of Suhilpur where she passed SSC from Suhilpur High School. She is the eldest of two brothers and three sisters. Her father Nurul Haque Suhilpur Fazil was a madrasa teacher.

== Career ==
Popy met movie director Montazur Rahman Akbar at a restaurant for a friend's birthday. Akbar proposed to cast her in his new film. Puspita accepted the offer and starred in her first film Ami Diwana. She later acted in other films. Biddhoto and, Thakor were yet to be released as of 2019.Puspita worked in pop drama and music videos starring Shakib Khan and Bappi Chowdhury, opposite Kazi Maruf.

== Filmography ==
year	Film	Role	Director	Note
2014	Age Jodi Jantam Tui Hobi Por	Sukhi	Monatajur Rahman Akbar	Debut Film
2018	Panku Jamai	Puspita	Abdul Mannan	
2018	Dhushor Kuasha		Uttom Akash	
