= Kukkhato Khuni =

2000 Bangladeshi film

- Kukkhato Khuni film poster
- Directed by: Montazur Rahman Akbar
- Screenplay by: Montazur Rahman Akbar
- Based on: Life of Ershad Sikder (unconfirmed)
- Produced by: Montazur Rahman Akbar, Manjurul Hasan
- Starring: Manna; Mousumi; Dipjol
- Cinematography: Lal Mohammad
- Edited by: Amzad Hossain
- Music by: Shawkat Ali Emon
- Production company: Panorama Movies
- Distributed by: Panorama Movies
- Release date: 2000
- Country: Bangladesh
- Language: Bangla
- Budget: ৳0.9 crore (equivalent to ৳4.4 crore or US$360,000 in 2024)
- Box office: ৳3.5 crore (equivalent to ৳17 crore or US$1.4 million in 2024)

Kukkhato Khuni is a Bangladeshi Bengali language film released in 2000. The film was directed and produced by Montazur Rahman Akbar. The film based on the biography of Ershad Sikder, although the director did not admit it. The story of the film was written by Abdullah Zahir Babu. The film topped the list of highest grossing films of 2000. in 79 hall, which was the first widest release for any Bangladeshi film.

== Plot ==
The infamous Godfather simply cut off the hands of a young man's father, and in retaliation, the young man gradually becomes a notorious murderer.

== Cast ==
- Manna - Babul
- Mousumi- Navana, Salauddin's niece
- Dipzol - Tarafdar
- Helal Khan - Badal
- Maury - hope
- Razzak - Aminul Haque, Babul's father
- Dolly Zahur - Minu, Babul's mother
- Dildar - Twina
- Humayun Faridi - Ismail Sardar, political leader
- Mizu Ahmed - Salauddin
- Sadeq Siddiqui - Alam
- ATM Samsuzzaman - Dal Pintu
- Misha Saudagar - Misha
- Jambu - Sambhu
- Faqira - Maktu, brother of Tarafdar
- Gangua - OC Rahman, OC of Agargaon Police Station
- Azharul Islam Khan - Commissioner of Police

== Music ==
The music of the film is composed by Shawkat Ali Emon with lyrics by Kabir Bakul. The song "Ami Andho" has been composed by Birbal and written by Riton Adhikari Rintu.

- "Mon Preme Poris Na" - Rizia Parveen
- "Ami Andho" - Swapan Khan
- "Shoni Robi Duidin Gelo" - Andrew Kishore, Uma Khan
- "Ei Hridoyer Sada Kagoje" (part 1) - Kanak Chapa, Kumar Bishwajit
- "Ei Hridoyer Sada Kagoje" (part 2) - Kanak Chapa, Kumar Bishwajit
