= Montazur Rahman Akbar =

Bangladeshi film director

- Born: Hasta Bosonto Pur, Rajshahi, East Pakistan
- Education: Joypurhat Degree College (B.A.)
- Occupations: Film director; producer; screenwriter; social worker; entrepreneur
- Years active: 1979–present
- Known for: Co-founder of Panorama Movies; Founder of Nayan-Apon Production; Founder of Star Plus; Founder of Prochesta; Founder of Drama Circle; Founder of Furniture Village
- Political party: Bangladesh Students Union^{(before 1980s)}
- Movement: Bangladesh Liberation War
- Spouse: Mariam Rahman (m. 1978)
- Awards: full list

Montazur Rahman Akbar (Bengali: মনতাজুর রহমান আকবর) is a Bangladeshi film director, screenwriter, producer, social activist and entrepreneur. He is known for his work in the Bengali-language film industry, which is centered in Dhaka, Bangladesh. Akbar also fought in the 1971 Bangladesh Liberation War.

After directing multiple plays, Akbar worked as an assistant director on the films Chhutir Ghonta and Janata Express under directors Matin Rahman and Azizur Rahman, respectively. He worked as an assistant director from 1979 to 1990.

Akbar became a director in 1991. He has worked with actor Manna on 22 films, writer Abdullah Zahir Babu on 46 films, actor Dipjol on 19 films and editor Amzad Hossain on 24 films. Akbar has written screenplays for some of his films. He founded the production companies Nayan-Apon Production and Star Plus, and he is co-founder of Panorama Movies. Akbar's films introduced various actors, including Dipjol, Popy, Keya, Riya Sen, Shakiba, Songita, Antara Biswas and Puspi, to Dhallywood. Akbar served as an executive board member of the Bangladesh Film Producers and Distributors Association and the Bangladesh Film Directors Association. He founded a development NGO, Prochesta, and a theater organization, Drama Circle. He has also directed television commercials and serial dramas. Akbar has appeared as guest judge for multiple television programs. He also runs several business enterprises.

== Personal life ==
=== Military career ===
Akbar fought in the Bangladesh Liberation War in 1971. He served Sector 7 under Sector Commander Quazi Nuruzzaman and Group Commander Saidur Rahman. Akbar trained at Panikhoni in Siliguri, India.

=== Education ===
Akbar attended Akkelpur FU Pilot High School in 1973 and Akkelpur MR Degree College in 1975. He received a Bachelor of Arts degree from Joypurhat Government College in 1977. While in college, he worked in his father's fish business and distributed fish across northern Bangladesh. He was also an active member of Bangladesh Chatro Union at that time.

=== Philanthropy ===
Akbar is the executive director of a non-governmental organization (NGO), Prochesta. He founded Prochesta in 2000 in his hometown, Joypurhat. Prochesta works with various partner organizations to improve sanitation, drinking water supply, and infrastructure in Joypurhat and nearby districts. Prochesta also spreads information about basic hygiene practices such as hand washing.

== Career ==
=== 1970–1989 ===
During the 1970s, Akbar participated in his local theater group, Chantara Club, and his college theater group, Akkelpur MR College Club. Between 1973 and 1978, he directed many stage dramas, including Pagla Garod, Sidur Niyona Muche, Ek Mutho Vat, Dayie Ke, Malar Prem and Nowab Siraj Ud Dowla. Akbar was an active member of the Bangladesh Chatro Union in the 1970s. He was also worked for his father's fish wholesale business at that time. In the 1980s, Akbar worked as assistant director under Azizur Rahman on several films, including Chhutir Ghonta, Janata, Express, Mayer Achol, Mehman, Mohanogor, Jontor Montor and Sonar Tori. He also worked for Matin Rahman on various films, including Lal Kajol, Jibon Dhara, Radha Kishna and Birangona Sokhina. He worked with Zillur Rahman on Tokdirer Khela, Miss Lolita, Achol Bondi, and Sukh Tara. In 1989, Akbar was a special correspondent for Weekly Nipoon, a weekly entertainment magazine published in Dhaka.

=== 1990–2000 ===
Akbar's worked as a director for the film Nyay Juddho in 1991. In 1992, Ilias Kanchon and Diti acted in Akbar's film Chakor. Akbar's first job as a director was for the film Takar Pahar, which had a delayed debut in 1993. Takar Pahar was produced by Anwar Hossain Afjal, the older brother of Dipjol. Also in 1993, he directed Prem Dewana, produced by A. K. M. Jahangir Khan under his banner Alamgir Pictures. He also directed Disco Dancer and Babar Adesh for Alamgir Pictures. In 1996, Akbar directed the films Baghini Konna, Khalnayok, Bashira and Shoitan Manush. In 1997, he directed Coolie. The film grossed 70 million Bangladeshi taka ($1.7M as of 1997) with a budget of 12 million, making it the highest-grossing Bangladeshi film of 1997. The actress Sadika Parvin Popy made her debut in Coolie. Later in 1996, Akbar cast Mousumi for the romantic film Andha Bhalobasha and the Alamgir Pictures film Amar Maa. In 1998, Akbar directed Shanto Keno Mastan, starring Manna. The film grossed 50 million against a budget of 9 million. Akbar also directed 5 films for Arman Production. Akbar directed the Indo-Bangla joint venture film Moner Moto Mon, it didn't do well commercially. Moner Moto Mon was Akbar's third collaboration with Bony Pictures, after his earlier work as an assistant director on the Bony Picture films Miss Lolita and Radha Kishno. In 1999, he was the advisor director for Helal Khan's film Asha Amar Asha. That same year, Akbar directed the films Ke Amar Baba, Bhoyongkor Bishu, Moger Mulluk and Lathi.

=== 2000–2009 ===
In 2000, Akbar and Monjurul Hassan co-founded the production company Panorama Movies. Akbar produced and directed Kukkhato Khuni for Panorama Movies. Arman Production's second film was Gunda Number One. His next film was Mone Pore Tomake, which introduced Riya Sen to mainstream cinema. In 2001, Akbar established a distributorship of the electronics brand Walton in Joypurhat under Apu Electronics Bazar (2001–2014). Rituparna Sen Gupta and Ilias Kanchon were cast in Chairman, another film directed by Akbar. Arman Production's third film, Kothing Bastob, which introduced Keya, was directed by Akbar. He also directed Rongbaz Badsha and Bhoungkor Sonstrasi, the latter of which was banned by censors. In 2002, he produced and directed Bhayanok Songghorso and an Arman Production film Major Saheb. He also directed a Dipjol film, Dhakaiya Mastan. Akbar directed three further films that year: Arman, Mastaner Upor Mastan and Aghat Palta Aghat. In 2003, he produced and directed Bachao, Top Somrat and the Dipjol film Kothin Shimar. He directed Bouer Somman, produced by Mousumi. Akbar also wrote songs for the film Big Boss. In 2004, Akbar directed Bostir Rani Suriya, with lead actors Sadika Parveen Popy, Shakib Khan and Dipjol. In 2005, he directed Bhoyonkor Raja and Action Lady. In 2006, Akbar founded Nayan-Apon Production. He made the films System, which came out in 2006, and Nishidhdho Prem, released in 2007 and produced by his wife Mariam Rahman. Akbar also directed Dushman Khotom in 2006 and Kukkhato Nuru in 2007. In 2008, Akbar founded StarPlus, where he produced and directed Babar Jonno Joddho. In 2009, he directed Kajer Manush, directed by Dipjol. Kajer Manush was a hit at the box office, and it won the Janatar Niswas Personality Award. Akbar later directed Tumi Amar Swami in 2009. He was also a guest judge on television reality programs Super Hero Super Heroin (NTV).

=== 2010–2020 ===
In 2010, Akbar directed and produced Top Hero with Shakib Khan. He and Dipjol cast Mayer Chokh and Rikshawalar Chele for his next films, Evabey Bhalobasha Hoy. The film used songs by singer S.D. Rubel. The film was successful at the box office. In 2011, Akbar directed the Dipjol films Chotto Songsar and Bajarer Coolie. That same year, he was a guest judge on Mirakkel Akkel Challenger (2011) on the channel Zee Bangla. In 2013, Akbar directed the Jaaz Multimedia film Tobuo Bhalobashi. Akbar switched to television and directed his first TV drama, Pakhal, which aired in 2013. He directed package dramas Golden Swarna, Bracelate and Kuasha. He also directed the drama serials Kaji Saheber Tin Putro and Pakhi Ebong Mnushera. He directed television commercials and documentaries such as Agency Greenland Training Center, Decent Holding and Hiton TV. In 2013, he was a guest judge on Voice of the Nation which premiered on Ekushey Television. In 2014, Akbar produced and directed the low-budget films Age Jodi Jantam Tui Hobi Por and My Name Is Simi. After the success of the Walton showroom, he took distribution of Pran under the trading corporation Mariam Traders later that year. In 2015, he produced and directed Bojhena Se Bojhena, which was neither very successful nor very unsuccessful at the box office. He also set up the furniture brand Furniture Village. In 2016, Akbar returned to the mainstream media with the film Nawab Siraj-Ud-Dowla, produced by United Club in Jamalgonj Theatre in Jamalgonj, Joypurhat. In 2017, he directed Dulavai Zindabad which yielded average box office returns. He also established a fashion house called Cholte Cholte, which lasted from 2016 to 2017. In 2018, Akbar founded the theater group Drama Circle in Joypurhat, Bangladesh. His first film under the group was Swadhinota Amar Maa. He also directed multiple short films, including Obohela, Riksawalar Shopno, Mobile Recharge, Ekti Premer Mrittu, Ekjon Medhabi Chatrir Mrittu and Dance Teacher. He also directed 53 episodes of the soap opera Ekdin Protidin.

=== 2021–present ===
On 7 December 2021 Kazi Shaheber Tin Putro premiered in YouTube. On 9 June 2023 Jemon Jamay Temon Bow released in 21 screen, 1 September 2023 Ghar Bhanga Sansar released in 30 screen. On 23 August 2024 Omanush Holo Manush.

== Board memberships ==
Organization	Position	Year	Note
Bangladesh Film Directors Association	Member	1992-1993 2023–2024	
Bangladesh Film Directors Association	Treasurer	1999-2001	
Bangladesh Film Directors Association	Vice-president	2017-2018	

== Works ==
=== As theater director ===
Play title	English translation	First production	House	Notes
Pagla Garod	Mental Asylum	1973	Chantara Club Akkelpur MR Collage Club Akkelpur Adarsha Club United Club	
Sidur Diyona Muche	Don't remove the vermilion	1974	Chantara Club Akkelpur MR Collage Club Akkelpur Adarsha Club United Club	
Ek Mutho Vat	One fist of rice	1975	Chantara Club Akkelpur MR Collage Club Akkelpur Adarsha Club United Club	
Dayi Ke ?		1976	Chantara Club Akkelpur MR Collage Club Akkelpur Adarsha Club United Club	
Malar Prem	Mala's love	1977	Chantara Club Akkelpur MR Collage Club Akkelpur Adarsha Club United Club	
Nawab Siraj-Ud-Dowla		1978	Chantara Club Akkelpur MR Collage Club Akkelpur Adarsha Club United Club	
Swadhinota Amar Maa	Freedom is my mother	2018	Drama Circle	

=== As television director ===
Title	Year	Network	Notes
Pakhal	2013	Mohona TV	
Bracelet	2013	SA TV	
Pakhi Ebong Manushra	2013	RTV	
Golden Swarna	2014	Channel i	
Ekdin Protidin	2018	Asian TV	(51st to 104th episode)
Kuasha	2019	RTV	
Kazi Shaheber Tin Putro	2021	YouTube	

=== As producer, director, writer ===
Year	Film	Director	Producer	Writer	Note
1980	Chhutir Ghonta	Assistant	No	No	Azizur Rahman
1981	Jonota Express	Assistant	No	No	Azizur Rahman
1981	Mohanogor	Assistant	No	No	Azizur Rahman
1981	Sonar Tori	Assistant	No	No	Azizur Rahman
1982	Jontor Montor	Assistant	No	No	Azizur Rahman
1982	Lal Kajol	Assistant	No	No	Motin Rahman
1983	Mehman	Assistant	No	No	Azizur Rahman
1984	Mayer Achol	Assistant	No	No	Azizur Rahman
1985	Duniya Dari	Assistant	No	No	Saiful Azom Kashem
1985	Miss Lolita	Assistant	No	No	Zillur Rahman
1986	Aynamoti	Assistant	No	No	Zillur Rahman
1988	Jibon Dhara	Assistant	No	No	Motin Rahman
1988	Sukhtara	Assistant	No	No	Zillur Rahman
1989	Achol Bondi	Assistant	No	No	Zillur Rahman
1989	Sukher Songsar	Assistant	No	No	Narayon Ghosh Mita
1989	Birangana Shokhina	Assistant	No	No	Motin Rahman
1989	Takdirer Khela	Assistant	No	No	Zillur Rahman
1991	Nyay Juddho	Yes			
1992	Radha Kishna	Assistant	No	No	Motin Rahman
1992	Chakor	Yes		Yes	highest-grossing films of the year.
1993	Prem Deewana	Yes			
1993	Takar Pahar	Yes		Yes	His directorial debut film, but the release was delayed; introduction of Dipjol
1994	Disco Dancer	Yes		Yes	
1995	Babar Adesh	Yes		Yes	
1996	Baghini Konna	Yes			
1996	Kholnayok	Yes		Yes	
1996	Bashira	Yes		Yes	
1996	Shoitan Manush	Yes		Yes	
1997	Coolie	Yes		Yes	Introduction of the actress Popy, highest-grossing films of the year.
1997	Amar Maa	Yes			
1997	Ondho Bhalobasha	Yes			
1998	Shanto Keno Mastan	Yes		Yes	highest-grossing films of the year.
1998	Moner Moto Mon	Yes		Yes	Indo-Bangladesh joint production, known as Raja Rani in India. Also released in the Odia language in Odisha.
1999	K Amar Baba	Yes		Yes	
1999	Moger Mullok	Yes		Yes	
1999	Lathi	Yes		Yes	
1999	Bhoyongkar Bishu	Yes			
1999	Asha Amar Asha	No	No	No	As adviser director
2000	Gunda Number One	Yes		Yes	
2000	Mone Pore Tomake	Yes		Yes	Riya Sen's first Bangladeshi film
2000	Kukkhato Khuni	Yes	Yes	Yes	highest-grossing films of the year.
2001	Bhoyongkor Sonstrasi	Yes			
2001	Kothin Bastob	Yes			
2001	Chairman	Yes		Yes	
2001	Rongbaz Badsha	Yes		Yes	
2002	Dhakaiya Mastan	Yes		Yes	
2002	Bhoyanok Songhorsho	Yes	Yes		
2002	Major Saheb	Yes		Yes	
2002	Arman	Yes			
2002	Mastaner Upor Mastan	Yes		Yes	highest-grossing films of the year.
2002	Aghat Palta Aghat	Yes			
2003	Bouer Somman	Yes		Yes	Originally titled Ami Tomake Bhalobashi
2003	Bigboss	Yes		Yes	Also wrote song lyrics
2003	Kothin Simar	Yes			
2003	Top Somrat	Yes	Yes	Yes	
2003	Bachao	No	Yes	No	
2004	Bhaier Shotru Bhai	Yes		Yes	
2004	Jiboner Gurranty Nai	Yes			
2004	Bostir Rani Suriya	Yes		Yes	
2004	Bhondo Neta	Yes		Yes	
2005	Action Lady	Yes			
2005	Bhoyogkor Raja	Yes			
2006	Dushman Khotom	Yes			
2007	Kukkhato Nuru	Yes			
2008	Babar Jonno Joddho	Yes	Yes	Yes	
2009	Tumi Amar Shami	Yes			
2009	Kajer Manush	Yes			Won the Janatar Niswas Personality Award
2010	Mayer Chokh	Yes			
2010	Rikshahawaler Chele	Yes			
2010	Top Hero	Yes	Yes		
2010	Evabey Bhalobasha Hoi	Yes		Yes	S.D. Rubel's first introduction as a lead role
2011	Chotto Songshar	Yes			
2011	Bazarer Coolie	Yes			
2013	Tobuo Bhalobashi	Yes			
2014	Age Jodi Jantam Tui Hobi Por	Yes	Yes		
2014	My Name Is Simi	Yes			
2015	Bojhena Se Bojhena	Yes	Yes	Yes	
2017	Dulabhai Zindabad	Yes			
2018	Riksawalar Shopno	Yes			Short film
2018	Obohela	Yes			Short film
2018	Mobile Recharge	Yes			Short film
2018	Ekti Premer Mrittu	Yes			Short film
2018	Ekjon Medhabi Chatrir Mrittu	Yes			Short film
2018	Dance Teacher	Yes			Short film
2023	Jemon Jamay Temon Bou	Yes		Yes	
2023	Ghor Vanga Songsar	Yes		Yes	
2024	Omanush Holo Manush	Yes			

== Awards and honours ==
Year	Film / Work / Honorary	Award	Result
2016	Honorary	Jamalgonj United Club	Won
2017	Honorary	Film Related Freedom Fighter's Reception	Won
