= Thiruvilaiyaadal Aarambam =

- Poster
- Directed by: Boopathy Pandian
- Written by: Boopathy Pandian
- Produced by: Vimala Geetha
- Starring: Dhanush; Shriya Saran; Prakash Raj
- Cinematography: Vaidy S.
- Edited by: G. Sasikumar
- Music by: D. Imman
- Production company: R. K. Productions
- Release date: 17 December 2006
- Country: India
- Language: Tamil

Thiruvilaiyaadal Aarambam (transl. The Divine Game Begins) is a 2006 Indian Tamil-language romantic comedy film written and directed by Boopathy Pandian. The film stars Dhanush, Shriya Saran, and Prakash Raj, while Karunas and Saranya Ponvannan play supporting roles. The film, which had music composed by D. Imman, was released on 17 December 2006 and became a major success. It was remade in Telugu as Takkari (2007), in Kannada as Dhool (2011), and in Bangladeshi as Daring Lover (2014).

== Plot ==
Thirukumaran "Thiru" is a carefree, unemployed, street-smart man who spends time hanging out with his friends. His father berates him for being unemployed, and his younger brother looks down on him, while he finds solace with his mother. One day, Thiru meets Priya in a temple and falls in love with her. Thiru later learns that Priya is the younger sister of Guru, a rich business tycoon, and tries to woo her. After several hilarious attempts, Priya and Thiru fall in love.

Guru witnesses Priya hanging out with Thiru and beats him up. Priya, upon learning this, attempts suicide, which shocks Guru, who meets up with Thiru to give up his love since Priya is his only sister, whom he brought up with a lot of love and care, while mocking Thiru's societal status as he would be unable to provide Priya with all her needs. Thiru negotiates with Guru for a hefty sum of money to give up his love, which Guru begrudgingly agrees. Thiru takes the money home but is driven out by his father, who suspects him of obtaining the money illegally. Thiru uses the money to establish a business, and after a few months, he becomes a rich businessman.

Priya soon learns of Thiru's dealings with Guru and breaks up with him for misusing their love. Thiru's business empire grows larger, and he becomes a hotshot, surpassing even Guru, who tries various ways to thwart his business but fails. Guru later realises that to push Thiru off the edge, he would have to get Priya married to someone else. Guru hires goons to kill Thiru, but Thiru defeats them, makes it to the marriage hall just in time, and hands over the money that he had borrowed from Guru. Thiru explains that he used his love as collateral to build his business, as love was everything had left, and he had to risk it. Guru, impressed by Thiru's business ethics, accepts him as Priya's groom.

== Cast ==
- Dhanush as Thirukumaran "Thiru"
- Shriya Saran (voice: Savitha) as Priya
- Prakash Raj as Guru
- T. S. B. K. Moulee as Chandramohan
- Saranya Ponvannan as Saradha
- Karunas as Tiger Kumar
- Ilavarasu as Muthukrishnan
- Kadhal Sukumar as Shiva
- U. S. Vasan
- Mayilsamy as Tidel Park Venugopal
- Meena Kumari as Gowri
- Grace Karunas as Grace
- Karthik Kannaiyan as Swaminathan
- Varnika as Valarmathi
- Pasi Sathya
- Krishnamoorthy as Inspector
- Singamuthu as Bus Conductor
- Bayilvan Ranganathan
- Kadugu Ramamoorthy

== Production ==
Boopathy Pandian had initially discussed the lead role with Bharath, but the actor's refusal meant that Dhanush was chosen, reuniting with the director after Devathaiyai Kanden (2005). The film was initially titled Naveena Thiruvilayadal, and later shortened to Thiruvilayadal, prompting actor Sivaji Ganesan's fan club to request the producer, Vimala Geetha, to retitle the film because of Ganesan's 1965 film; they felt that the new venture would defame the old film. The director said the film's title was a reference to the games played by Dhanush's character Thiru to achieve his goals; nevertheless, it was retitled Thiruvilaiyaadal Aarambam. Shriya Saran, the lead actress, initially opted out of the film owing to her commitment to work in Sivaji: The Boss, but returned after she was able to allot dates. One of the film's two fight sequences was shot on a set created at Binny Mills.

== Soundtrack ==
The soundtrack was composed by D. Imman. It includes a remixed version of the song "Ennama Kannu", composed by Ilaiyaraaja for the film Mr. Bharath (1986). The remix retains the original lyrics by Vaali, and adds new ones by Vairamuthu.

Track listing
No.	Title	Lyrics	Singer(s)	Length
1.	"Adara Ramma"	Viveka	D. Imman	4:39
2.	"Ennama Kannu"	Vaali, Vairamuthu	Karthik, K. G. Ranjith	4:16
3.	"Kannukkul Yetho"	Na. Muthukumar	Rita Thyagarajan, Vijay Yesudas	4:15
4.	"Madurai Jilla"	Viveka	Karthik, Kalpana Raghavendar	4:28
5.	"Theriyaama Parthuputen"	Thiraivannan	Ranjith, Sujatha Mohan	4:16
6.	"Vizhigalil Vizhigalil"	Viveka	Harish Raghavendra	4:46
Total length:				26:29

== Release ==
Thiruvilaiyaadal Aarambam was released on 17 December 2006, and, as of January 2007, had grossed ₹100 million (equivalent to ₹330 million or US$3.4 million in 2026) in Tamil Nadu – the highest for a Dhanush film at that time.

== Critical reception ==
Shwetha Bhaskar of Rediff.com noted that "Director Boopathy Pandian has a looser hold on pacing, ensuring that the interest never flags", adding that "the real reason to watch Thiruvilaiyadal Aarambam is Dhanush, who epitomises the new age hero: he is no superman, he is not even close to perfect, and he is thoroughly unapologetic about it all." Sify said, "Dhanush as the hyperactive Thiru is simply superb and his ability to deliver funny lines casually is uncommendable. Prakash Raj does his role to perfection, while Shriya looks good and her costumes are fabulous."

Lajjavathi of Kalki praised Bhoopathi Pandian for narrating a simple plot in an interesting and humorous manner within three hours while praising the performances of Dhanush and Prakash Raj and the clashes between them, dialogues and music. Malini Mannath of Chennai Online wrote the film "is a wholesome, light-hearted family entertainer sans scenes that make you squirm for it's [sic] overt glamour or violence. You can [forget] your blues and laugh through this one".

== Remakes ==
In 2007, the film was remade in Telugu as Takkari. It was also remade in Kannada as Dhool in 2011, with Prakash Raj reprising his role. In 2014, the film was remade in Bangladeshi as Daring Lover.
