= Dulavai Zindabad =

Bangladeshi action drama film

Dulabhai Zindabad
- Directed by: Montazur Rahman Akbar
- Written by: Abdullah Jahir Babu
- Story by: Md. Nadir Khan
- Produced by: Md. Nadir Khan
- Starring: Moushumi; Dipjol; Mim; Bappy
- Cinematography: Istofa Rahman
- Edited by: Shahidul Haque
- Music by: Imon Saha; Imran; Belal Khan; Kabir Bakul
- Production company: Rajesh Films
- Release date: 20 October 2017
- Country: Bangladesh
- Language: Bengali
- Budget: 11 million

Dulabhai Zindabad is a Bangladeshi dramatic action film directed by Montazur Rahman Akbar. The film was written by Abdullah Zahir Babu and screenplay was by Montazur Rahman Akbar. The film stars Moushumi, Mim, Bappy and Dipjol in the lead roles. with Aruna Biswas, Amit Hasan, Ahmed Sharif as supporting cast. The film was produced by Md Nadir Khan under the banner of Rajesh Films. The film was released on 20 October 2017 in Bangladesh.

== Plot ==
Joshna(Moushumi) is a hard working NGO employee who leads a struggling life with her autistic brother and two sisters. Her husband sultan (Dipjol) fights against injustice and crime in their village but when his sister in law (Mim) falls in love with the son of the unethical Chairman of the village, Sultan is left in a life and death dilemma.

== Cast ==
- Moushumi as Josna
- Dipjol as Sultan aka Dulabhai, Josna's husband
- Mim as Jamuna, Joshna's sister
- Bappy as Sagor
- Aruna Biswas
- Amit Hasan
- Ahmed Sharif
- Bobby
- Jacky Alamgir
- Elias Kobra
- Shabnam Parvin
- Ziasmin
- Saif Khan

== Music ==
Track List
No.	Title	Lyrics	Music	Singer(s)	Length
1.	"Dulavai Zinndabad"	Kabir Bakul	Imon Saha	Monir Khan, Samina Chowdhury, Dinat Jahan Munni
2.	"Ami Vangariwala"	Kabir Bakul	Kabir Bakul	Monir Khan
3.	"Tomar Moto Emon Manush"	Robiul Islam Jibon	Belal Khan	Belal Khan, Oishi
4.	"Mon Jane Tui Chara"	Faisal Rabbikin	Imran	Imran, Kona

== Filming ==
Shooting started on 16 February 2017 at BFDC. After completing some scenes at Dipjol's house, the film was finished on 13 July 2017. The film got release clearance on 29 August 2017, and the trailer was released on 27 September 2017 via YouTube.

== Release ==
The film was released on 128 screens on 20 October 2017.
