= Kabirul Islam Ratan =

- কবিরুল ইসলাম রতন
- Born: Kabirul Islam Ratan
- Occupations: Dance director and Choreographer
- Years active: Unknown–Present
- Notable work: Ki Jadu Korila
- Awards: National Film Awards (1st time)

Kabirul Islam Ratan is a Bangladeshi film dance director and choreographer. In 2007, he won the Bangladesh National Film Award for Best Choreography for the film Ki Jadu Korila.

== Selected films ==
- Ki Jadu Korila – 2007

== Awards and nominations ==
National Film Awards

| Year | Award | Category | Film | Result |
|---|---|---|---|---|
| 2007 | National Film Award | Best Choreographer | Ki Jadu Korila | Won |
