= Apu Biswas =

Bangladeshi model and actress

- অপু বিশ্বাস
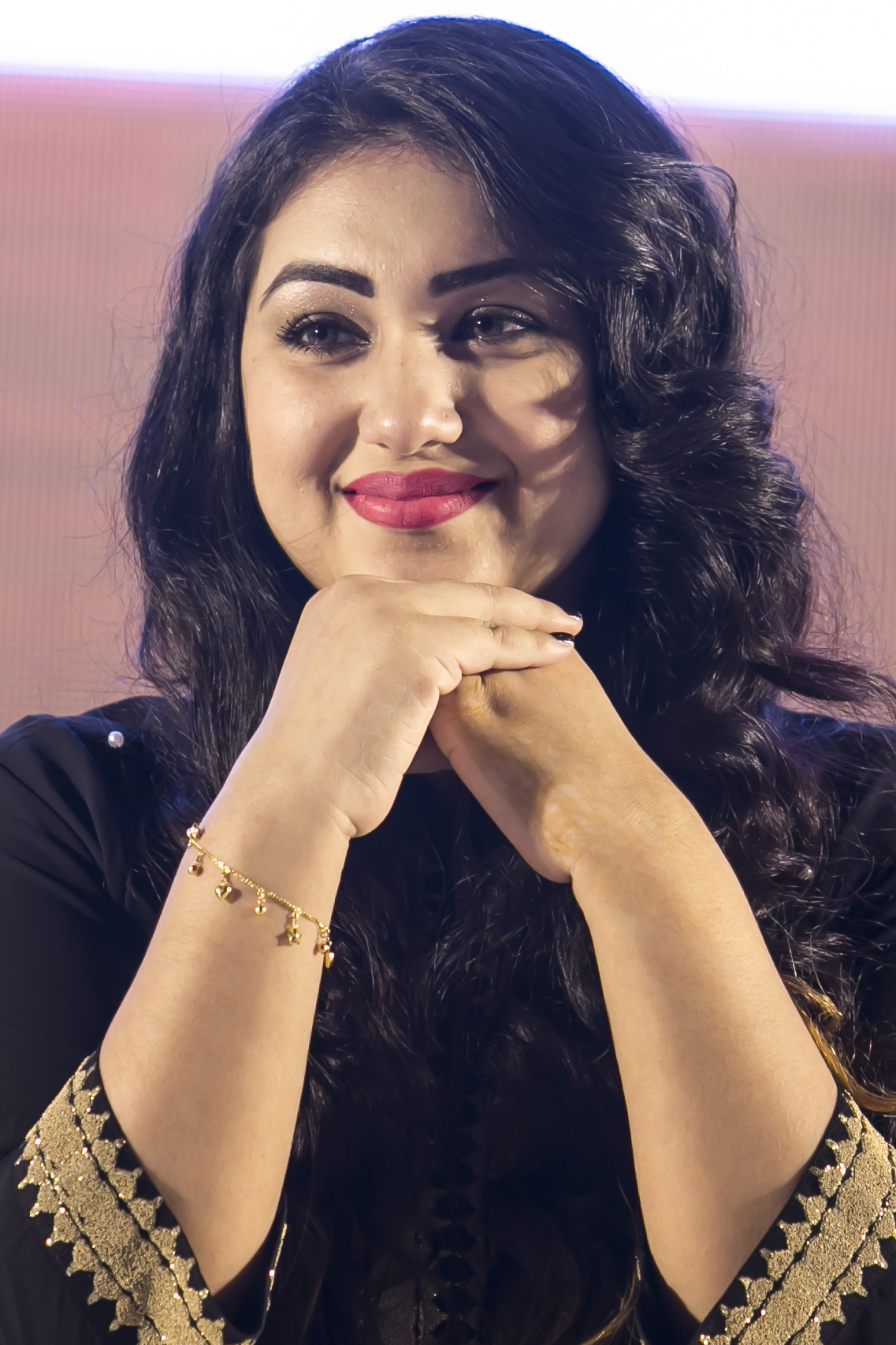
- Apu Biswas in 2018
- Born: 11 October 1989 (age 37); Bogra, Bangladesh
- Occupations: Model; actress
- Years active: 2005–present
- Spouse: Shakib Khan (m. 2008; div. 2018)
- Children: 1

Apu Biswas (born 11 October 1989) is a Bangladeshi film actress and model. At the start of her career, she struggled to establish herself as a lead actress in films such as Kaal Sokale, O Amar Chhele, Machine Man and Pitar Ason, but blockbuster films such as Koti Takar Kabin, Chachchu surged her career as one of the leading actresses of Dhallywood. At the end of the 2010s, films such as Number One Shakib Khan and Bhalobaslei Ghor Bandha Jay Na continued her domination as a top actress of the time and her pairing with actor Shakib Khan became one of the most successful well known film couples.

In 2006, she starred in the FI Manik-directed Koti Takar Kabin as the lead female opposite Shakib Khan for the first time, with whom she later acted in more than 75 films.

== Early life ==
Apu Biswas Megha was born on 11 October 1989 in Bogra, Bangladesh, to Upendronath Bishwas (d. 2014) and Shefali Bishwas (d. 2020). Apu is the youngest of three daughters and a son.

== Career ==
Biswas made her debut in the film industry with the film Kal Shokale in 2006. She then performed in Koti Takar Kabin. Biswas played the role of Parvati in the 2013 Bangladeshi remake of Devdas. She performed in the 2013 film My Name Is Khan.

== Personal life ==
On 18 April 2008, Biswas married actor Shakib Khan. The couple has a son, Abraam Khan Joy (born September 27, 2016). They kept their marriage a secret until 10 April 2017, when Apu appeared on television with her son and revealed it. Khan filed for a divorce on 22 November 2017, and the couple was divorced on 22 February 2018.

Biswas had earlier claimed in 2017 that she converted to Islam from Hinduism to marry Khan. However, in a May 2025 interview with The Daily Ittefaq, Biswas clarified that she never converted to Islam during her marriage to Shakib Khan, contrary to her earlier claims. She stated that she was compelled to lie about the conversion due to considerations for her family and her son's future, and she has remained a follower of Hinduism.

== Filmography ==
Year	Film	Role	Notes	Ref.
2005	Kaal Sokale	Bashonti	Debut film	
2006	O Amar Chhele	Fancy		
2006	Koti Takar Kabin	Simran Shikder		
2006	Pitar Ason	Dina		
2006	Dadima	Tasmina Sultana "Preeti"		
2006	Chachchu	Riya Chowdhury		
2007	Ami Bachte Chai	Tania		
2007	Kotha Dao Sathi Hobe	Alo		
2007	Swamir Songshar	Sajani Chowdhury		
2007	Machine Man	Labonno		
2007	Kabin Nama	Kajol Chowdhury		
2007	Tomar Jonno Morte Pari	Jui		
2008	Ek Buk Bhalobasha	Preeti		
2008	Amader Choto Shaheb	Riya		
2008	Amar Jaan Amar Pran	Aditi		
2008	Sontan Amar Ohongkar	Parul		
2008	Tumi Swapno Tumi Sadhona	Ful		
2008	Mone Prane Acho Tumi	Nila		
2008	Jodi Bou Sajogo	Kotha		
2008	Tumi Amar Prem	Tasneem Akter "Mou" / Priya		
2008	Pita Matar Amanat	Apu		
2008	Maa Babar Shopno	Mati		
2008	Goriber Chele Boro Loker Meye	Srabanti		
2009	Mon Jekhane Hridoy Sekhane	Jhinuk		
2009	Bhalobashar Lal Golap	Aboni		
2009	Mone Boro Kosto	Ishara		
2009	Jaan Amar Jaan	Priya		
2009	O Sathii Re	Sathi		
2009	Jonmo Tomar Jonno	Nandini		
2009	Bolona Kobul	Alo		
2009	Mayer Hate Beheshter Chabi	Mishti		
2009	Shubho Bibaho	Meghna		
2009	Bhalobasha Dibi Kina Bol	Chandni		
2010	Bajao Biyer Bajna	Deepika		
2010	Bhalobaslei Ghor Bandha Jay Na	Aleya Alo		
2010	Preme Porechi	Priya		
2010	Number One Shakib Khan	Rosy Chowdhury aka Rose		
2010	Nissash Amar Tumi	Asha		
2010	Chachchu Amar Chachchu	Bubly Talukdar		
2010	Amar Buker Moddikhane	Titli		
2010	Top Hero	Kahini		
2010	Takar Cheye Prem Boro	Priya		
2010	Hai Prem Hai Bhalobasha	Kiran		
2010	Jonom Jonomer Prem	Sathi		
2010	Premik Purush	Simran		
2010	Jibon Moroner Sathi	Kajol		
2010	Tumi Amar Moner Manush	Nila		
2010	Prem Mane Na Badha	Upoma		
2011	Moner Jala	Chandni		
2011	Ontore Acho Tumi	Roja Shikder		
2011	Koti Takar Prem	Alo		
2011	Tor Karone Beche Achi	Priya		
2011	Ekbar Bolo Bhalobashi	Shikha Chowdhury		
2011	Moner Ghore Boshot Kore	Bubly / Advocate Nusrat Jahan		
2011	King Khan	Munia		
2011	Ke Apon Ke Por	Phool		
2011	Adorer Jamai	Gohona		
2011	Jaan Kurbaan	Sathi		
2011	Priya Amar Jaan	Priya		
2012	Ek Takar Denmohor	Priya		
2012	Ek Mon Ek Pran	Asha		
2012	Dhakar King	Nila		
2012	Durdorsho Premik	Dina		
2012	Ziddi Mama	Nilima		
2012	Buk Fatey To Mukh Foteyna	Tuli		
2013	Devdas	Parvati "Paro"		
2013	My Name Is Khan	Jhinuk Chowdhury		
2013	Premik Number One	Simi		
2014	Bhalobasha Express	Bonna		
2014	Daring Lover	Priya Chowdhury		
2014	Hero: The Superstar	Priya Khan		
2014	Hitman	Tania		
2014	Kothin Protishodh	Dola		
2014	Shera Nayok	Baby		
2015	Love Marriage	Monica a.k.a. Moni		
2015	Dui Prithibi	Moyna		
2015	Rajababu - The Power	Sathi		
2016	Raja 420	Rani		
2016	Samraat: The King Is Here	Ruhi		
2017	Rajneeti	Orsha		
2018	Panku Jamai	Nusrat Jahan "Nupur"		
2021	Priyo Komola	Komola		
2022	Shoshurbari Zindabad 2	Ishana		
2022	Ajker Shortcut	Nargis	Released on ZEE5; Indian Bengali film	
2022	Isha Kha	Sonamoy		
2023	Prem Pritir Bandhan	Priti		
2023	Chayabazi	Nishtha Rahman	Released on RTV	
2023	Lal Shari	Sraboni	Also producer	
2024	Trap: The Untold Story	Raisa		
2024	Chhaya Brikkho	Tuli		
2026	Durbar †	TBA	Filming	
TBA	Opare Chondroboti †	TBA	Delayed	
