= Daring Lover =

Bangladeshi film

- Directed by: Badiul Alam Khokon
- Written by: Komol Sarkar
- Story by: Boopathy Pandian
- Produced by: S M Film International
- Starring: Shakib Khan; Apu Biswas; Misha Sawdagor; Prabir Mitra
- Music by: Ali Akram Shuvo & Shajib Khan
- Distributed by: S M Film International
- Release date: 11 April 2014
- Country: Bangladesh
- Language: Bengali

Daring Lover is a 2014 Dhallywood film directed by Badiul Alam Khokon starring Shakib Khan and Apu Biswas in lead roles, while Misha Sawdagor, Prabir Mitra and Rehana Jolly play other pivotal roles. It is a remake of the 2006 Tamil language comedy film Thiruvilaiyaadal Aarambam. Upon release, sahos24.com characterized the film's first day box office as a success.

== Plot ==
Raja (Shakib Khan) is a brilliant man who wants to become a Realtor, much to the chagrin of his father (Prabir Mitra), who doesn't support his goal. Eventually Raja wins the heart of a rich girl, Priya (Apu Biswas), sister to a business tycoon and villainous Rashed Rayhan Chowdhury (Misha Sawdagor) He realizes his ambition in real estate. Rashed wants him to drop his sister; Raja in return demands money. He gives him a cheque from a dubious bank. However, Raja gets his money as he blackmails Priya's brother, threatening to expose some photos. Rashed also plans an IT raid on Raja's companies. However, that plan backfires. Then Rashed tries to get his sister married to another man, but Raja marries her. The story ends with Raja returning all the money taken from Rashed, who finally accepts the marriage.

== Cast ==
- Shakib Khan as Raja
- Apu Biswas as Priya
- Misha Sawdagar as Rashed Rayhan Chowdhury, Priya's brother
- Prabir Mitra as Raja's father
- Rehana Jolly as Raja's mother
- Ilias Kobra
- Ratan Khan as Raja's friend
- Puja Cherry as child artist

== Soundtrack ==
Track list
No.	Title	Singer(s)	Length
1.	"Chupi Chupi Mon"	S. I. Tutul & Moon	4:55
2.	"O Priya Tumi"	Shajib Khan (শাজিব খান)	4:21
3.	"Dekhle Tore Monta Bole"	S. I. Tutul & Doly Sayontoni	4:06
4.	"Aha! Ki Rup Dekhaila"	Asif Akbar	4:49
5.	"Kine Ne Ami Je"	Moon	4:21
