= Hasibul Islam Mizan =

Bangladeshi film director (1957–2019)

- হাসিবুল ইসলাম মিজান
- Born: 7 September 1957
- Died: 18 April 2019 (aged 62)
- Occupations: Film Director, Scriptwriter
- Years active: 1998-2019
- Known for: Film Direction
- Notable work: Amar Sopno Tumi, Kopal, Tumi Acho Hridoye
- Spouse: Rashida Akter

Hasibul Islam Mizan (7 September 1957 – 18 April 2019) was a Bangladeshi film director who directed many Dhallywood films.

== Biography ==
Mizan was born in 1957 in Pirojpur. He made his debut as a director in Dhallywood with Premer Kosom. This film was the debut film of Mahfuz Ahmed. He directed romantic comedy Amar Shopno Tumi, with Shakib Khan Shabnur and Ferdous Ahmed, which was most successful film in his career was released in 2005. He again collaborated with Khan and Shabnur in Kopal and his last direction Tumi Achho Hridoye was released in 2007.

Mizan died on 18 April 2019 at the age of 62.

== Selected filmography ==
- Premer Kosom
- Amar Shopno Tumi
- Jonmo
- Kopal
- Tumi Acho Hridoye
