= H. Subrata =

Indonesian media magnate (born 1940)

Dr. H. Subrata (born July 4, 1940 in Cirebon, West Java) is an Indonesian media magnate. He is the former of Director General of Press and Graphics.
