= Subrata Chowdhury =

Indian cricketer (born 1959)

Personal information
- Born: 6 January 1959 (age 67); Agartala, Tripura, India
- Batting: Right-handed
- Bowling: Slow left-arm orthodox

Career statistics
Competition	First-class
Matches	8
Runs scored	295
Batting average	19.66
100s/50s	0/2
Top score	73
Balls bowled	1068
Wickets	14
Bowling average	43.35
5 wickets in innings	0
10 wickets in match	0
Best bowling	4/84
Catches/stumpings	1/–
- Source: , 29 April 2025

Subrata Chowdhury is an Indian cricketer who played first-class cricket for Tripura. He played first-class cricket in the seasons of 1987/88 and 1988/89.
