= Bojhena Se Bojhena (film) =

Bangladeshi romantic action film

- Directed by: Montazur Rahman Akbar
- Written by: Montazur Rahman Akbar, Komol Sarkar
- Produced by: Montazur Rahman Akbar
- Starring: Akash Khan; Achol; Prabir Mitra; Amit Hasan
- Cinematography: Istofa Rahman
- Edited by: Shohidul Hoque
- Music by: Amit Chatterji, Kabir Bakul
- Production company: Nayan-Apon Production
- Distributed by: Nayan-Apon Production
- Release date: 8 May 2015
- Country: Bangladesh
- Language: Bangla

Bojhena Se Bojhena (2015) is a Bangladeshi romantic action film written, produced and directed by Montazur Rahman Akbar. The film stars Akash Khan, Achol, and Amit Hasan. The film was released by Nayan-Apon Productions. The film starred Akash Khan.

== Story ==
The story involved the Mirja and Chowdhury families. Achol Mirja had 3 brothers. Kabila Chowdhury fell in love with Achol. Achol returned to her village with her brothers, where she fell in love with Akash.

== Cast ==
- Akash Khan
- Achol
- Prabir Mitra
- Rehana Jolly
- Amit Hasan
- Fakira
- Kabila
- Katha
