= Kabuliwala (2006 film) =

Bangladeshi film

- Kabuliwala movie poster
- কাবুলিওয়ালা
- Directed by: Kazi Hayat
- Written by: Kazi Hayat
- Story by: Rabindranath Tagore
- Based on: Kabuliwala by Rabindranath Tagore
- Produced by: Faridur Reza Sagor; Ibn Hasan Khan
- Starring: Manna; Dighi; Subrata Barua; Doyel
- Cinematography: Alamgir Khoshru
- Edited by: Chishti Jamal
- Music by: Sagir Ahmed
- Production company: Impress Telefilm Limited
- Distributed by: Impress Telefilm Limited
- Release date: 4 August 2006
- Running time: 123 minutes
- Country: Bangladesh
- Language: Bengali Language

Kabuliwala (Bengali: কাবুলিওয়ালা) is a drama film of 2006 directed by Kazi Hayat. It was based on "Kabuliwala", an 1892 short story written by Rabindranath Tagore. Kazi Hayat conducted the screenplay and dialogues. Faridur Reza Sagar and Ibn Hasan Khan jointly produced this film under the banner of Impress Telefilm Limited. Manna played the title role in this film as Rahmat. Dighi played the role of mini. Her real life parent Subrata Barua & Doyel, played the role of her father and mother in this film. It was the first time they acted together in a film.

Kabuliwala was released on August 4, 2006. Dighi won the National Film Award as the best child artist for her role Mini.

== Storyline ==
Rahmat Sheikh is a fruit seller from Kabul, Afghanistan. He comes to Bengal province to hawk his merchandise. He becomes a friend of little girl, Mini, who was the daughter of a writer. To Rahmat, Mini resembles his daughter. He used to stay in a boarding house with some of his countrymen.

Suddenly, Rahmat receives a letter from Kabul saying his daughter is sick. He plans to leave for Kabul soon, so he goes to Jayanta for the money he was owed for some products he bought on credit. Jayanta insults him and Rahmat stabs Jayanta as the situation goes out of control.

Rahmat is truthful in the court and confesses. The judge is impressed with his honesty and gives him 10 years of rigorous imprisonment instead of a death sentence.

== Cast ==
- Manna – Rahmat Sheikh, Kabuliwala
- Prarthona Fardin Dighi – Mini
- Subrata – Writer, Mini's Father
- Doyel – Mini's Mother
- Black Anwar – Vola
- Jacky Alamgir – Joyonto Sur.
- Momena – Joyonto's Wife
- Nader Khan – Nader
- Habib Khan – Habib
- Kazi Hayat – Dialogue
- Fazle Haque
- Jahanara Bhuiya
- Dulari Chakroborty
- Kala Aziz – Pankaj
- Boby

== Music ==
Sagir Ahmed tuned the songs of Kabuliwala. M R Nilu directed the background music.

== Awards ==
National Film Award

- Winner Best Child Artist – Dighi
