= Bangladesh National Film Award for Best Choreography =

National Film Award for Best Choreography
- Awarded for: Excellence in cinematic achievements for Bangladeshi cinema
- Sponsored by: Government of Bangladesh
- Location: Dhaka
- Country: Bangladesh
- Presented by: Ministry of Information
- First award: 1992 (17th)
- Final award: 2018 (43rd)
- Currently held by: Masum Babul (2018)

Highlights
- Most awards: Masum Babul (3 wins)
- Total awarded: 10
- First winner: Amir Hossain Babu (1992)
- Website: moi.gov.bd

The Bangladesh National Film Award for Best Choreography (Bengali: বাংলাদেশ জাতীয় চলচ্চিত্র পুরস্কার শ্রেষ্ঠ চিত্রনাট্যকার) is one of the highest film awards in Bangladesh. Since 1992, the awards have been given in the category of best choreography. The first award winner was Amir Hossain Babu. He and Masum Babul has won most awards in this category (3 times).

== List of winners ==
Key

Table key
indicates a joint award for that year	‡ Indicates the winner of Best Film

List of award recipients, showing the year and film(s)
Year (Note: Denotes The year in which the film was censored by Bangladesh Film Censor Board.)	Recipient(s)	Work(s)	Refs.
1992 (17th)	Amir Hossain Babu	Beporoya	
1993 (18th)	Masum Babul	Dola	
1994 (19th)	Not Given		
1995 (20th)	Not Given		
1996 (21st)	Not Given		
1997 (22nd)	Not Given		
1998 (23nd)	Not Given		
1999 (24th)	Not Given		
2000 (25th)	Not Given		
2001 (26th)	Amir Hossain Babu	Meghla Akash	
2002 (27th)	Not Given		
2003 (28th)	Not Given		
2004 (29th)	Not Given		
2005 (30th)	Not Given		
2006 (31st)	Not Given		
2007 (32nd)	Kabirul Islam Ratan	Daruchini Dip †	
2008 (33rd)	Masum Babul	Ki Jadu Korila	
2009 (34th)	Tanjil Alam	Amar Praner Priya	
2010 (35th)	Imdadul Haque Khokon	Mughal-e-Azam	
2011 (36th)	Not Given		
2012 (37th)	Not Given		
2013 (38th)	Not Given		
2014 (39th)	Not Given		
2015 (40th)	Not Given		
2016 (41st)	Mohammed Habib	Niyoti	
2017 (42nd)	Ivan Shahriar	Dhat Teri Ki	
2018 (43rd)	Masum Babul	Ekti Cinemar Golpo	

== Sources ==
- BFDC (2012). "List of National Film Award recipients name 1975-2012" (PDF). Bangladesh Film Development Corporation (in Bengali). Dhaka: Ministry of Information (Bangladesh). pp. 1–23. Archived from the original (PDF) on 1 November 2020.
- BFDC (2013). "National Film Award 2013". Bangladesh Film Development Corporation (in Bengali). Dhaka: Ministry of Information (Bangladesh). Archived from the original on 18 September 2020.
- BFDC (2014). "National Film Award 2014". Bangladesh Film Development Corporation (in Bengali). Dhaka: Ministry of Information (Bangladesh). Archived from the original on 18 September 2020.
- BFDC (2015). "National Film Award 2015" (PDF). Bangladesh Film Development Corporation (in Bengali). Dhaka: Ministry of Information (Bangladesh).
- BFDC (2016). "National Film Award 2016" (PDF). Bangladesh Film Development Corporation (in Bengali). Dhaka: Ministry of Information (Bangladesh).
- BFDC (2018). "National Film Award 2017-2018" (PDF). Bangladesh Film Development Corporation (in Bengali). Dhaka: Ministry of Information (Bangladesh). Archived (PDF) from the original on 1 November 2020.
