= Koshto (film) =

Bangladeshi film

- Koshto Movie Poster
- Bengali: কষ্ট
- Directed by: Kazi Hayat
- Screenplay by: Dipjol
- Produced by: Kazi Hayat
- Starring: Manna; Moushumi; Shakil Khan; Dipjol
- Music by: Alam Khan
- Release date: 17 March 2000
- Country: Bangladesh
- Language: Bengali
- Budget: ৳1 crore (US$81,000)
- Box office: ৳3 crore (US$240,000)

Koshto (English: The Pain, Bengali: কষ্ট) is a 2000 Bangladeshi film starring Manna, Moushumi and Dipjol. Moushumi garnered a Bachsas Award for Best Actress for her performance in the film.

== Soundtrack ==
All music is composed by Ahmed Imtiaz Bulbul and lyrics also penned by himself. Prince Mahmud's famous song "Ma" is attached here, slightly modified and re-composed by Ahmed Imtiaz Bulbul.

No.	Title	Lyrics	Singer(s)	Length
1.	"Tumi Chara Duniyate"		Konok Chapa and Monir Khan
2.	"Maa"	Prince Mahmud	James	4:57
3.	"Tomar Premer Jonne"		Konok Chapa and Kumar Biswajit
4.	"Januk Januk Jogotbashi"		Konok Chapa and Kumar Biswajit
5.	"Khub Chhotto Ekta Ghar"		Konok Chapa

== Awards ==
Bachsas Awards

- Best Actress 2000 – Moushumi
- Best Supporting Actor 2000 – Dipjol
- Best Female Playback Singer 2000 – Konok Chapa
