= Masum Babul =

Bangladeshi film dance director and choreographer

- মাসুম বাবুল
- Born: Muhammad Masum Babul; 31 December 1962
- Died: 6 March 2023 (aged 60); Dhaka, Bangladesh
- Occupations: Film director, choreographer
- Years active: 1987–2023
- Notable work: Beder Meye Josna Koti Takar Kabin Bikkhov
- Awards: National Film Awards (3rd times)

Masum Babul (31 December 1962 – 6 March 2023) was a Bangladeshi film dance director and choreographer.

== Career ==
He won the Bangladesh National Film Award for Best Choreography twice, for the film Dola (1993) and Ki Jadu Karila (2008). He is also best known for the films Beder Meye Josna (1989), Koti Takar Kabin (2006), and Bikkhov (1994).

== Death ==
Babul died on 6 March 2023, at age 60.

== Selected films ==
- Dayee Ke? - 1987
- Beder Meye Josna - 1989
- Mayer Doa - 1990
- Dangga Fasaad - 1990
- Rajar Meye Bedeni - 1991
- Dangga - 1991
- Bondhu Amar - 1992
- Chakor - 1992
- Keyamot Theke Keyamot - 1993
- Voyangkor Saat Din - 1993
- Dola - 1993
- Prem Dewana - 1993
- Ondho Prem - 1993
- Abujh Sontan - 1993
- Tyag - 1993
- Tumi Amar - 1994
- Ontore Ontore - 1994
- Bikkhov - 1994
- Prem Juddho - 1994
- Den Mohor - 1995
- Don - 1995
- Babar Adesh - 1995
- Anjuman - 1995
- Shopner Thikana - 1995
- Mayer Odhikar - 1996
- Boshira - 1996
- Jibon Snagshar - 1996
- Priyojon - 1996
- Tomake Chai - 1996
- Meghla Akash - 1996
- Soitan Manush - 1996
- Moumachi - 1996
- Bisar Hobe - 1996
- Shopner Prithibi - 1996
- Ajker Shontrashi - 1996
- Durjoy - 1996
- Shopner Nayok - 1997
- Anondo Osru - 1997
- Coolie - 1997
- Kotha Dau - 1997
- Buker Vitore Agun - 1997
- Shanto Keno Mastan - 1998
- Ke Amar Baba - 1999
- Ammajan - 1999
- Ononto Bhalobasa - 1999
- Biyer Phul - 1999
- Srabon Megehr Din - 1999
- Jhor - 2000
- Gunda Number One - 2000
- Shikari - 2001
- Rangbaz Badsha - 2001
- Oder Dhor - 2002
- Bhaiya - 2002
- Mastaner Upor Mastan - 2002
- Sundori Badhu - 2002
- Bir Soinik - 2003
- Bou Shashurir Juddho - 2003
- Dui Bodhu Ek Swami - 2003
- Karagar - 2003
- Ondhokar - 2003
- Praner Manush - 2003
- Mannna Bhai - 2004
- Ajker Samaj - 2004
- Char Sotiner Ghar - 2005
- Dui Noyoner Alo - 2005
- Matritwa - 2005
- Molla Barir Bou - 2005
- City Terror - 2005
- Momtaz - 2005
- Hazar Bosor Dhore - 2005
- Ami Jail Theke Bolsi - 2005
- Koti Takar Kabin - 2006
- Hridoyer Kotha - 2006
- Pitar Ason - 2006
- Bakul Fuler Mala - 2006
- Bindur Chele - 2006
- Dapot - 2006
- Kopal - 2007
- Doctor Bari - 2007
- Shotru Shotru Khela - 2007
- Amar Praner Shami - 2007
- Ma Amar Swargo - 2007
- Ulta Palta - 2007
- Mone Prane Aso Tumi - 2008
- Amader Choto Saheb - 2008
- Badhubaron - 2008
- Mayer Shopno - 2008
- Akash Choa Bhalobasha - 2008
- Tumi Amar Prem - 2008
- Boro Bhai Zindabad - 2008
- Baba Amar Baba - 2008
- Shontan Amar Ahongkar - 2008
- Tumi Shopno Tumi Shadhona - 2008
- Amar Jaan Amar Pran - 2008
- Bhalobahsar Dushmon - 2008
- Somadhi - 2008
- Jomidar Barir Meye - 2008
- O Sathi Re - 2009
- Tumi Ki Sei - 2009
- Saheb Name Golam - 2009
- Moyna Motir Sangshar - 2009
- Sabaito Bhalobasha Chay - 2009
- Jibon Niye Juddho - 2009
- Kajer Manush - 2009
- Bhalobasha Dibi Kina Bol? - 2009
- Amar Praner Priya - 2009
- Bolona Kobul - 2009
- Mayer Hate Behester Chabi - 2009
- Prem Koyedi - 2009
- Jonmo Tomar Jonno - 2009
- Sobar Upore Tumi - 2009
- Mon Chuyese Mon - 2009
- Chirodini Ami Tomar - 2009
- Bostir Chele Kotipoti - 2010
- Bhalobaslei Ghor Bandha Jay Na - 2010
- Chachchu Amar Chachchu - 2010
- Amar Shopno Amar Songshar - 2010
- Takar Cheye Prem Boro - 2010
- Ek Jobarn - 2010
- Premik Purush - 2010
- Top Hero - 2010
- Preme Poreshi - 2010
- Poran Jay Joliya Re - 2010
- Mayer Chokh - 2010
- Jomidar - 2010
- Bolo Na Tumi Amar - 2010
- Bajao Biyer Bajna - 2010
- Rickshawalar Chele -2010
- Adorer Jamai - 2011
- Boss Number One - 2011
- Amar Pritibi Tumi -2011
- Koti Takar Prem - 2011
- Astro Charo Kolom Dhoro - 2011
- Garments Konya - 2011
- Matir Thikana - 2011
- Moner Jala - 2011
- Don Number One - 2012
- Raja Surja Kha - 2012
- Dhakar King - 2012
- Manik Raton Dui Bhai - 2012
- Swami Bhaggor - 2012
- Se Amar Mon Kerese - 2012
- Bajarer Kuli - 2012
- Most Welcome - 2012
- Jee Huzur - 2012
- The Speed - 2012
- Jotil Prem - 2013
- Ki Prem Dakhaila - 2013
- Full & Final - 2013
- Poramon - 2013
- Tobuo Bhalobashi - 2013
- Onno Rokom Bhalobasha - 2013
- Bhalobasha Ajkaal - 2013
- Ek Cup Cha - 2014
- Hitman - 2014
- Perm Korbo Tomar Sathe - 2014
- Love Paap Pape Mrittu - 204
- Agnee - 2014
- ShopnoChoya - 2014
- Desha:The Leader - 2014
- Hero The Super Star
- I Don't Care - 2014
- Shera Nayok - 2014
- Sedin Bristi Hoyechilo - 2014
- Aro Bhalobashbo Tomay - 2015
- Podmo Patar Jol - 2015
- Lover Number One - 2015
- Bojhena Se Bojhena - 2015
- Podmo Patar Jol - 2015
- Big Bother - 2015
- Raja Babu - 2015
- Sweetheart - 2016
- Samrat - The King is here
- Matir Pori - 2016
- Mon Janena Moner Thikana - 2016
- Baje Chele - The Loafer - 2016
- Black Money - 2016
- Rajneeti - 2017
- Swatta - 2017
- Sultana Bibiana - 2017
- Ohongkar - 2017
- Apon Manush - 2017
- Tui Amar - 2017
- Bijli - 2018
- Megh Konya - 2018

== Awards and nominations ==
National Film Awards

Year	Award	Category	Film	Result
1993	National Film Award	Best Choreographer	Dola	Won
2008	National Film Award	Best Choreographer	Ki Jadu Karila	Won
2018	National Film Award	Best Choreographer	Ekti Cinemar Golpo	Won
