= Koti Takar Kabin =

Bangladeshi film

- VCD Cover
- Directed by: F I Manik
- Screenplay by: Joseph Shatabdi
- Produced by: Monowar Hossain Dipjol
- Starring: Shakib Khan; Apu Biswas; Razzak; Farooque; Shuchorita; Dipjol
- Music by: Alauddin Ali
- Production company: Ami Boni Kothachitra
- Distributed by: Ami Boni Kothachitra
- Release date: 2006
- Country: Bangladesh
- Language: Bengali
- Box office: ৳ 40–50 million ($580,000–730,000 as of 2006)

Koti Takar Kabin (Bengali: কোটি টাকার কাবিন, lit. 'One Crore Taka Marriage Settlement') is a Bangladeshi romantic comedy produced by Ami Boni Kothachitra and directed by F I Manik. The film was released in 2006 all over Bangladesh. It stars Shakib Khan, Apu Biswas, Razzak, Farooque, and Suchorita.

== Cast ==
- Shakib Khan as Fahim Talukdar
- Apu Biswas as Simran Shikder
- Farooque as Mannab Talukdar
- Razzak as Aslam Shikder
- Dipjol as Sultan Talukdar
- Shuchorita
- Sadek Bacchu
- Misha Sawdagor
- Afzal Sharif

== Music ==
The film's music was directed by Alauddin Ali.

=== Soundtrack ===
All songs composed by Alauddin Ali and penned by Kabir Bakul, Munshi Wadud and Mohammed Rafiquzzaman.

No.	Tracks	Singer(s)	Lyricist
1	"Bhalobasha Ontobihin"	Andrew Kishore, Sabina Yasmin	Kabir Bakul
2	"Duniya Ta Rail Gari"	S. I. Tutul, Mimi	Kabir Bakul
3	"Emono Nodi Achhe"	Monir Khan	Kabir Bakul
4	"Prithibi Tumi Thomke Darao"	Kanak Chapa, Monir Khan	Munshi Wadud
5	"Amra Dujon Dilwala"	Andrew Kishore, Monir Khan	Mohammed Rafiquzzaman
