= Subrata (actor) =

Bangladeshi film actor

- Born: Subrata Barua; 1960 (age 65–66); Dhaka, East Pakistan, Pakistan
- Occupation: Actor
- Years active: 1985-present
- Spouse: Doyel (m. 1988; died 2011)
- Children: 2, including Prarthana Fardin Dighi

Shahrukh Fardin Subrata is a Bangladeshi film actor. He is better known as Subrata in the film industry. (Note: multiple sources:) He has appeared in over 140 films. He is the current deputy general secretary of the Bangladesh Film Artistes Association, the organisation of local film artists.

== Career ==
Subrata made his debut in 1985 with the film "Rai Binodini", directed by Mohammed Hannan. Later he established a strong position in Bangladeshi films industry through "Mala Bodol" and "Maiyar Nam Moina" which is directed by same director. His other notable films in the lead role are "Harano Sur" (1987) directed by Narayan Ghosh Mita, "Chandidas and Rozkini" (1987) directed by Rafiqul Bari Chowdhury, Tala Chabi directed by F Kabir Chowdhury, Shotota by Kamruzzaman. He’s been on the magazine show Ityadi a few times.

== Personal life ==
Subrata has been a popular actor in Bengali cinema since the eighties. He has given many popular movies by his talented performance. He fell in love with his co-actor Doyel during his acting career, and later they were married in 1988. They have two children in their family life. In 2011 Subrata's wife Doyel died of cancer. Their daughter Prarthana Fardin Dighi has already gained popularity as a child character in Bengali cinema.

== Notable films ==
- Nag Jyoti (1987)
- Kabuliwala (2006)
- Chachchu (2006)
- Chachchu Amar Chachchu (2010)
- Purno Doirgho Prem Kahini (2013)
- Kistimaat (2014)
- Matir Pori (2016)
- Ostitto (2016)
- Ojante Bhalobasha (2016)
- Mental (2016)
- Lal Sobujer Sur (2016)
- Dhat Teri Ki (2017)
- Rajneeti (2017)
- Lal Shari (2023)
- DayMukti (2025)
- Antonagor (2025)
- Taandob (2025)

=== Web series ===
- Black Money (2025)
