= Imdadul Haque Khokon =

Bangladeshi dance director and choreographer

- ইমদাদুল হক খোকন
- Born: Imdadul Haque Khokon; 14 August 1962 (age 63); Mirpur, Dhaka
- Occupations: Dance director and choreographer
- Years active: Unknown–present
- Notable work: Mughal-e-Azam
- Awards: National Film Awards

Imdadul Haque Khokon is a Bangladeshi dance director and choreographer. In 2010, he won the Bangladesh National Film Award for Best Choreography for the film Mughal-e-Azam.

== Selected films ==
- Bir Purush - 1988
- Keyamot Theke Kayamot - 1993
- Tumi Amar - 1994
- Bikkhov - 1994
- Grhina - 1994
- Commender - 1994
- Don - 1994
- Asha Bhalobasha - 1995
- Ei Ghor Ei Songshar - 1996
- Sottor Mrittu Nei - 1996
- Durjoy - 1996
- Shopner Nayok - 1997
- Buker Bhitor Agun - 1997
- Vondo - 1998
- Jhor - 2000
- Kosto - 2000
- Itihas - 2002
- Mejor Saheb - 2002
- Hason Raja - 2003
- Big Boss - 2003
- Manna Bhai - 2004
- Momotaz - 2005
- Banglar Bagh - 2005
- Pitar Ason - 2006
- Kabinnama - 2007
- Captain Maruf - 2007
- Sajhghor - 2007
- Swamir Sangshar - 2007
- Bouyer Jala - 2007
- Amar Jaan Amar Pran - 2008
- Tip Tip Brishty - 2008
- Tomake Bou Banabo - 2008
- Jamidar Barir Meye - 2008
- Takar Bou - 2008
- Jadi Bou Sajo Go - 2008
- Moyna Motir Sangshar - 2009
- Ebadot - 2009
- Swami Strir Wada - 2009
- Mon Bosena Porar Tebil E - 2009
- Saheb Name Golam - 2009
- Mon Diyesi Tomake - 2009
- Tumi Ki Sei - 2009
- Evabeo Bhalobasha Hoy - 2010
- Baap Boro Na Shasur Boro - 2010
- Amar Swapno Amar Songshar - 2010
- Matir Thikana - 2011
- Wanted - 2011
- Astro Charo Kolom Dhoro - 2011
- Amar Prithibi Tumi - 2011
- Garment Konya - 2011
- Moner Jala - 2011
- Chehara - 2012
- Pagla Haoya - 2012
- Jiddi Bou - 2012
- Swami Bhaggo - 2012
- Premer Keno Fashi - 2018

== Awards and nominations ==
National Film Awards

Year	Award	Category	Film	Result
2010	National Film Award	Best Choreographer	Mughal-e-Azam	Won
