= Kabir Bakul =

Bangladeshi lyricist and journalist

- কবির বকুল
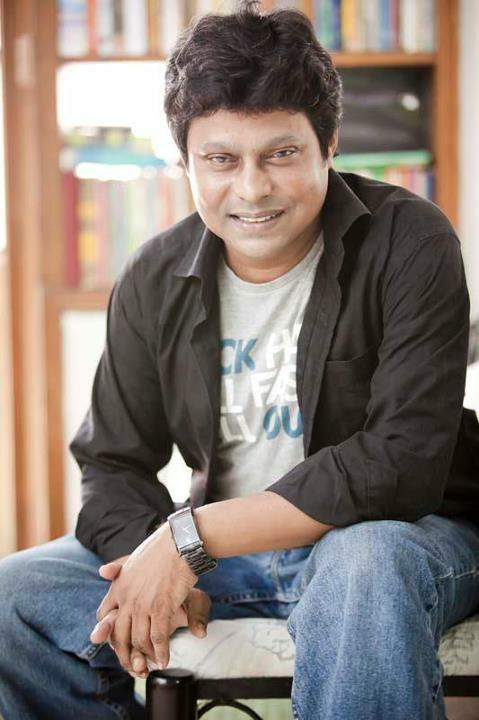
- Bakul in 2012
- Born: 21 November 1966 (age 59); Chandpur District, Bangladesh
- Education: University of Dhaka
- Occupations: Lyricist; journalist
- Years active: 1988-present
- Spouse: Dinat Jahan Munni (m. 1997)
- Children: 3

Kabir Bakul (Bengali: কবির বকুল; born 21 November 1966) is a Bangladeshi lyricist and journalist. He won the Bangladesh National Film Award for Best Lyrics 6 times for the films Megher Kole Rod (2008), Swami Strir Wada (2009), Nisshash Amar Tumi (2010), Purno Doirgho Prem Kahini (2013), Nayok (2018) and Bishwoshundori (2020). As of 2013, he has written about 5000 songs.

== Early life and career ==
Bakul was born and grew up in Chandpur. He learnt singing from Shital Kumar Ghoshal. In 1987, he first came to Dhaka and gave thirteen lyrics to singer Tapan Chowdhury. Bakul's first song, Kaal Shara Raat, was featured in Ayub Bachchu’s album, Moyna. The second was sung by Naseem Ali Khan from Souls. At that time, he was a masters student at the University of Dhaka. He then started working with Monowar Hossen Tutul.

Bakul became a reporter for the Daily Bhorer Kagoj. He has been serving as the head of Prothom Alo's Ananda page since 2004.

Bakul started writing songs professionally in 1991. In 1994, he wrote his first song for a feature film, Agni Shantan. He teamed up with Shakib Khan in Abu Sayeed Khan's romance drama Dujon Dujonar in 1999.

Bakul hosted a musical television program titled "Sur Shambhar," aired on Bangladesh Television.

== Works ==
=== Songs ===
- Tomar Oi Chokh (Bappa Mazumder)
- Mon Dabaru (Dalchhut)
- Aj Din Katuk Gane (Souls)
- Pothe Jete Jete (Naseem Ali Khan)
- Nishongota (Souls)
- Bestota (Souls)
- Nirmalendu Goon (Souls)
- Kuheli Jane Ki Ajo (Souls)
- Kalo Maiya Kalo Boila (Chime)
- Prithibir Moto Hridoytake (Tapan Chowdhury)
- Priyar Moner Kotha (Tapan Chowdhury)
- Dekhe Tomay (Doly Shaontoni)
- Phul Joto Shundor (Pronob Ghosh)
- Bhabte Parina (Shuvro Dev)
- Tomake Dekhle (Shakila Zafar)
- Chandrima Rate (Kajal)
- Amar Ek Noyon (Salma Akhter)
- Boishakh (Asif Akbar)
- Baje Re Baje Dhol Ar Dhak
- Akasher Buk Theke (Tapan Chowdhury)
- Onushuchona (Tapan Chowdhury)
- Tumi Megh Dekhecho (Kanak Chapa)
- Tomar Poth Amar Poth Bhinno Hote Pare (Runa Laila & Sabina Yasmin)
- Ekhono Hoy Bhor (Tapan Chowdhury)
- Chad Tara Nodi Ful Akash Bole (Tapan Chowdhury)
- Hridoy Ekta Ayna (Dilshad Nahar Kona & Imran Mahmudul)
- Jodi Pathore Ghoshe (Tapan Chowdhury)
- Deho Theke Mon (Tapan Chowdhury)
- O Rosher Kaliya (Tapan Chowdhury)
- Jiboner Golpo (Tapan Chowdhury)
- Ami More Gele (Tapan Chowdhury)

=== Filmography ===
- Dorodi Sontan (1997)
- Ke Aporadhi (1997)
- Noropishach (1997)
- Andho Ain (1998)
- Kalo Choshma (1998)
- Matribhumi (1998)
- Ruti (1998)
- Shanto Keno Mastan (1998)
- Asha Amar Asha (1999)
- Bhoyonkor Bishu (1999)
- Ke Amar Baba (1999)
- Kodom Ali Mastan (1999)
- Praner Priyotoma (1999)
- Dujon Dujonar (1999)
- Kukkhato Khuni (2000)
- Mone Pore Tomake (2000)
- Biplobi Jonota (2001)
- Hridoyer Bandhon (2001)
- Kothin Shasti (2001)
- Kothin Bastob (2001)
- Shikari (2001)
- Arman (2002)
- Bou Hobo (2002)
- Juddhe Jabo (2002)
- Swami Streer Juddho (2002)
- Baba (2003)
- Big Boss (2003)
- Chai Khomota (2003)
- Dui Bodhu Ek Swami (2003)
- Gundar Prem (2003)
- Khuner Porinam (2003)
- Rustom (2003)
- Stree Keno Shotru (2003)
- Satyer Bijoy (2003)
- Shotrur Mokabela (2003)
- Top Somrat (2003)
- Villain (2003)
- Baap Betar Lorai (2004)
- Bachelor (2004)
- Dhor Shoytan (2004)
- Jiboner Guarantee Nai (2004)
- Kothin Purush (2004)
- Teji Purush (2004)
- Agun Amar Naam (2005)
- Bishakto Chokh (2005)
- Char Sotiner Ghor (2005)
- Chhotto Ektu Bhalobasha (2005)
- Molla Barir Bou (2005)
- Amar Shopno Tumi (2005)
- Tak Jhal Mishti (2005)
- Banglar Hero (2006)
- Hira Amar Naam (2006)
- Hridoyer Kotha (2006)
- Koti Takar Kabin (2006)
- Mayer Morjada (2006)
- Pitar Ason (2006)
- Rani Kuthir Baki Itihash (2006)
- Amar Praner Swami (2007)
- Jomoj (2007)
- Machine Man (2007)
- Shotru Shotru Khela (2007)
- Swamir Songsar (2007)
- Tomar Jonyo Morte Pari (2007)
- Tui Jodi Aamar Hoiti Re (2007)
- Tumi Acho Hridoye (2007)
- Ulta Palta 69 (2007)
- Amar Jaan Amar Praan (2008)
- Amader Chhoto Saheb (2008)
- Ek Takar Bou (2008)
- Chandragrohon (2008)
- Mone Prane Acho Tumi (2008)
- Koti Takar Fokir (2008)
- Mukhomukhi (2008)
- Priya Amar Priya (2008)
- Tumi Shopno Tumi Sadhona (2008)
- Megher Koley Rod (2008)
- Mone Boro Kosto (2009)
- Shaheb Name Golam (2009)
- Shubho Bibaho (2009)
- Bolbo Kotha Bashor Ghore (2009)
- Swami Strir Wada (2009)
- Tumi Amar Swami (2009)
- 5 Takar Prem (2010)
- Amar Buker Modhyekhane (2010)
- Bhalobashlei Ghor Bandha Jayna (2010)
- Bolona Tumi Amar (2010)
- Chachchu Amar Chachchu (2010)
- Nisshash Amar Tumi (2010)
- Mayer Chokh (2010)
- Preme Porechi (2010)
- Takar Cheyeo Prem Boro (2010)
- Top Hero (2010)
- Ek Cup Cha (2010)
- Anko (2011)
- Ek Takar Denmohor (2011)
- Goriber Bhai (2011)
- King Khan (2011)
- Moner Jala (2011)
- Projapoti (2011)
- Tor Karone Beche Achhi (2011)
- Ek Mon Ek Pran (2012)
- My Name Is Sultan (2012)
- Purno Doirgho Prem Kahini (2013)
- Nishpap Munna (2013)
- Bhalobasa Aaj Kal (2013)
- Premik Number One (2013)
- Judge Barrister Police Commissioner (2013)
- Hero: The Superstar (2014)
- Big Brother (2015)
- Warning (2015)
- Bojhena Se Bojhena (2015)
- Sweetheart (2016)
- Bossgiri (2017)
- Dulavai Zindabad (2017)
- Apon Manush (2017)
- Ekti Cinemar Golpo (2018)
- Bissowsundori (2021)
- Gorom Mosla

== Awards ==
- Bangladesh National Film Award for Best Lyrics (2008, 2009, 2010, 2013, 2018, 2020)
- Citycell-Channel i Music Award
- Producers' Association Award

== Personal life ==
Bakul is married to musician Dinat Jahan Munni since 1997. Together they have two daughters, Prerona and Protikkha, and a son, Prochchhod.
