= Dadima =

Former populated place in Turkey

Coordinates: 38°34′21″N 39°10′26″E

Dadima was a town of Mesopotamia, inhabited during Byzantine times. It became the seat of a Christian bishop; no longer a residential see, it remains a titular see of the Roman Catholic Church.

Its site is located near Tadım in Anatolia.
