= List of Bangladeshi films of 2010 =

This is a list of Bangladeshi films that were released in 2010.

== Releases ==
| Opening | Title | Director | Cast | Genre | Notes | Ref. |
|---|---|---|---|---|---|---|
| 1 January | Takar Cheye Prem Boro | Shahadat Hossain Liton | Shakib Khan, Apu Biswas | | | |
| | Panch Takar Prem | | Mamnun Hasan Emon, Resi | | | |
| | Nag Naginir Shopno | M M Sarker | Shakiba, Zayed Khan, Nazrul | | | |
| 15 January | Bajao Biyer Bajna | Mohammad Hossain Jamie | Riaz, Apu Biswas, Nutan, Kayes Arju | | | |
| | Arun Shanti | | Shayer Khan, Mitali | | | |
| 15 January | Jaago – Dare to Dream | Khijir Hayat Khan | Ferdous Ahmed, Afsana Ara Bindu, Arifin Shuvoo, Tariq Anam Khan, Rownak Hasan, FS Nayeem | Sports, drama | | |
| 29 January | Golapi Ekhon Bilatey | Amjad Hossain | Moushumi, Mithun Chakraborty, Shabnur, Ferdous Ahmed | Drama | | |
| 29 January | Doriya Parer Doulati | Abdullah Al Mamun | Manna, Popy, Jasmin Parvez | Drama | | |
| 14 February | Preme Porechi | Shahadat Hossain Liton | Shakib Khan, Romana, Apu Biswas, Ali Raz, Asif Iqbal, Humayun Faridi | Romance | | |
| | Oshanto Mon | Kazi Hayat | Kazi Maruf, Sahara, Swagata Bhattacharjee, Kazi Hayat, Misha | Romance, action | | |
| | Jibon Moroner Sathi | Shahadat Hossain Liton | Shakib Khan, Apu Biswas | | | |
| 12 February | Zamindar | Shahin Sumon | Riaz, Purnima, Shimra, Rubel | Drama | | |
| | Shei Tufan | Hafiz Uddin | Ilias Kanchan, Popy, Aman, Keya | Action | | |
| | Amar Shopno | Kazi Hayat | Kazi Maruf, Purnima | | | |
| 26 March | Gohine Shobdo | Khalid Mahmud Mithu | Mamnun Hasan Emon, Kushum Shikdar, Masum Aziz, Haidar Ali Khan | Drama, romance | | |
| | Amar Buker Modyokhane | Shafi Iqbal | Shakib Khan, Apu Biswas, Resi | | | |
| | Maa Amar Jaan | | Kazi Maruf, Purnima | | | |
| | Nijhum Aronye | | Shajal Noor, Badhon | | | |
| 16 April | Khoj: The Search | Iftakar Chowdhury | Ananta Jalil, Afiea Nusrat Barsha, Bobby, Sohel Rana, Nino, Iftakar Chowdhury | Action | | |
| | Jonom Jonomer Prem | Shahin Sumon | Shakib Khan, Apu Biswas | Romance | | |
| | Tumi Amar Moner Manush | Azadi Hashnat Firoz | Shakib Khan, Apu Biswas | | | |
| | Mayer Chokh | Montazur Rahman Akbar | Purnima, Sirajul Islam Kiron, Dipjol, Resi | | | |
| | Bhalobaslei Ghor Bandha Jay Na | Jakir Hossain Raju | Shakib Khan, Apu Biswas, Romana, Prabir Mitra, Khaleda Akter Kolpona | Romance | | |
| | Tumi Chara Bachi Na | | Amin Khan, Shanai, Kazi Hayat, Humayun Faridi | | | |
| | Banglar Kingkong | Iftekhar Jahan | Munmun, Danny Sedak, Shamin Osman, Afzal Sharif, Kazi Hayat | | | |
| | Amar Maa Amar Ohonkar | | Kazi Maruf, Purnima | | | |
| | Bhaolobeshe Morte Pari | Badiul Alam Khokon | Shakib Khan, Sahara, Resi | | | |
| | Jekhane Tumi Sekhane Ami | Shawkat Jamil | Aman, Shabnur, Simla, Ilias Kanchan, Champa, Alamgir | | | |
| | Chehara - Vondo 2 | Shahidul Islam Khokon | Shakib Khan, Resi | | | |
| 2 July | Amar Shopno Amar Songsar | F I Manik | Amin Khan, Purnima, Resi, Dipjol | Romance | | |
| 2 July | Premik Purush | Rakibul Islam Rakib | Shakib Khan, Apu Biswas, Romana | | | |
| | Mayer Jonno Morte Pari | Ahmed Nasir | Kazi Maruf, Sahara, Mamnun Hasan Emon, Resi, Dolly Jahur | | | |
| 10 September | Obujh Bou | Nargis Akter | Ferdous Ahmed, Bobita, Nipun Akter, Shakil Khan, Priyanka | Romance, drama | Premiered on Channel i | |
| 11 September | Rickshawalar Chele | Montazur Rahman Akbar | Dipjol, Resi, Shomrat, Romana, Razzak | Drama | | |
| 11 September | Number One Shakib Khan | Badiul Alam Khokon | Shakib Khan, Apu Biswas, Anan | | | |
| 11 September | Nissash Amar Tumi | Badiul Alam Khokon | Shakib Khan, Apu Biswas | | | |
| 11 September | Chachchu Amar Chachchu | PA Kajol | Shakib Khan, Apu Biswas | | | |
| | Boroloker Doshdin Gariber Ek din | Kazi Hayat | Kazi Maruf, Sahara, Nirab Hossain, Nipun Akter, Misha Sawdagor, Rehana Jolly, Kazi Hayat, Suchorita | | | |
| | Swami Amar Behesto | | Amin Khan, Popy | | | |
| | Top Hero | Montazur Rahman Akbar | Shakib Khan, Apu Biswas | | | |
| 15 October | Mughal-E-Azam | Mizanur Rahman Dipu | Manna, Shabnur, Sohel Rana, Nasima Khan, Tele Samad, Nasir Khan, Nasrin | History, drama | | |
| 22 October | Bolona Tumi Amar | M B Manik | Shakib Khan, Shokh, Nirab, Toma Mirza, Misha Sawdagor | Romance | | |
| 23 October | ...Ebong Kanna | Hossain Maruf | Ashok Bepari, Shafiqul Hayder | Drama | based on Akhteruzzaman Elias's short story "Kanna" | |
| 29 October | Jungle Dwiper Tarzan | Sujaur Rahman Suja | Rony, Poly | | | |
| 31 October | Durbeen | Zafor Firoze | Tamim, Zafor Firoze, Kaji Akhtarujjamn | Drama | | |
| 19 November | Ek Joban | F I Manik | Resi, Dipjol, Anwara, Joy Chowdhury, Lamia Mimo | Crime, drama | | |
| 19 November | Poran Jai Jaliya Re | Sohanur Rahman Sohan | Shakib Khan, Purnima, Romana, Nodi, Misha Sawdagor, ATM Samshuzzaman | Romance | | |
| 17 November | Bostir Chele Kotipoti | Swapan Chowdury | Kazi Maruf, Sahara, Shakiba, Aman, Masum Aziz, Misha Sadagor, Dolly Jahur | Action, drama | | |
| 18 November | Dubshatar | Nurul Alam Atique | Joya Ahsan, Ashok Bepari, Sahriar Shuvo, Wahida Mollick Jolly, Shrabastee Tinny | Drama | Premiered on Channel i | |
| 19 November | Hay Prem Hay Valobasha | Nazrul Islam Khan | Shakib Khan, Apu Biswas, Suchorita, Ali Raz, Misha Sawdagor | | | |
| 19 November | Prem Mane Na Badha | Safi Iqbal | Shakib Khan, Apu Biswas, Sohel Rana, Suchorita | | | |
| 19 November | Pirates - The Blood Secret | Noman Robin | Ohona, Rashed Mamun, Saju Khadem, Antu Karim | Adventure | Premiered on RTV | |
| 3 December | Moner Manush | Goutam Ghose | Prosenjit Chatterjee, Raisul Islam Asad, Chanchal Chowdhury, Paoli Dam, Shahed Ali, Mir Naofil Ashrafi | Drama | | |
| 3 December | Baap Boro Na Shoshur Boro | Shahadat Hossain Liton | Shomrat, Resi, Razzak, Suchorita, Nipun Akter, Abir Khan | Comedy, romance | | |
| | Ora Amake Bhalo Hote Dilo Na | Kazi Hayat | Kazi Maruf, Purnima, Bobita | | | |
| 10 December | Runway | Tareque Masud | Fazlul Haque, Nusrat Imroz Tisha, Rabeya Akter Moni, Jayanta Chattopadhyay | Drama | | |
| 17 December | Jemon Jamai Temon Bou | Uttam Akash | Mamnun Hasan Emon, Chandni, Humayun Faridi | | | |
| | Rokto Chosha | Niru Biswas | Amit Hasan, Poly, Alexandar Bo, Moumita, | Action | | |
| | Prem Bishad | AKM Firoz Babu | Arju Khan, Piyanka | | | |
| 31 December | Opekkha | Abu Sayeed | Jayanto Chattapaddhay, Mirana Zaman, Tinu Karim | Drama | | |
| 31 December | Evabey Bhalobasha Hoy | | Sirajul Islam Kiron, S.D. Rubel, Shabnur | | Bisakto, Rakibul Hassan, Dinar Ahmed, Razia Zaman | |

== See also ==
- List of Bangladeshi films of 2011
- List of Bangladeshi films
- Cinema of Bangladesh
