= List of Bangladeshi films of 2011 =

This is a list of Bangladeshi films that were released in 2011.

== January–March ==
Opening		Title	Director	Cast	Genre	Notes
J A N U A R Y	7	Ma Amar Chokher Moni	Mustafizur Rahman Manik	Shabnur, Bapparaj, Razzak, Samrat, Nirab Hossain, Romana, Suchorita	Family, drama	
J A N U A R Y	14	Ma er Jonno Pagol	Ahmed Nasir	Sohel Rana, Kazi Maruf, Purnima, Bobita, Mamnun Hasan Emon, Nodi, Sharmili Ahmed	Family, drama	
J A N U A R Y	21	Bhalo Hote Chai	Shahed Chowdhury	Amit Hasan, Nodi	Action, drama	
J A N U A R Y	21	Paper Prachchitto	M M Sarker	Amin Khan, Nodi, Zayed Khan, Shaila	Action, drama	
J A N U A R Y	21	Meherjaan	Rubaiyat Hossain	Shaina Amin, Omar Rahim, Jaya Bachchan, Victor Banerjee, Humayun Faridi	War, drama, romance	
J A N U A R Y	28	Nosto Jibon	Rokibul Alam Rokib	Manna, Nodi	Action	
J A N U A R Y	28	Ashtro Charo Kolom Dhoro	Raju Chowdhury	Kazi Maruf, Purnima	Action	

== April–June ==
Opening		Title	Director	Cast	Genre	Notes
A P R I L	1	Amar Bondhu Rashed	Morshedul Islam	Raisul Islam Asad, Humayra Himu, Chowdhury Zawata Afnan, Arman Parvez Murad	War, drama	based on Muhammad Zafar Iqbal's novel of the same title
A P R I L	8	Wanted	Azad Khan	Kazi Maruf, Kazi Hayat, Misha Sawdagor	Action	
A P R I L	14	Guerrilla	Nasiruddin Yousuf	Joya Ahsan, Ferdous Ahmed, Ahmed Rubel, Shatabdi Wadud, A.T.M Shamsuzzaman	War, drama	Based on the events of Bangladesh Liberation War
A P R I L	15	Madhumati	Shahjahan Chowdhury	Riaz, Chaity, Masud Akhand	Drama	based on Rabeya Khatun's novel of the same title
A P R I L	22	Moner Jala	Malek Afsari	Shakib Khan, Apu Biswas	Action, romance	
M A Y	13	Rajpather Badshah	M. A. Awal	Masum Parvez Rubel	Action	
M A Y	20	Antore Acho Tumi	P A Kajal	Shakib Khan, Apu Biswas		
J U N E	3	Darwaner Chele	Rokibul Alam Rokib	Kazi Maruf, Sahara, Mukti	Romance	
J U N E	3	Gariber Mon Onek Boro	Mohammad Aslam	Amin Khan, Purnima, Nipun Akter		
J U N E	10	Matir Thikana	Shah Alam Kiran	Shakib Khan, Purnima, Shakiba	Drama, romance	
J U N E	10	Bondhu Tumi Shatru Tumi	Royal Babu	Kazi Maruf, Amit Hasan, Nirab Hossain, Sahara, Keya	Action	
J U N E	24	Koti Takar Prem	Sohanur Rahman Sohan	Shakib Khan, Apu Biswas	Romance	

== July–September ==
Opening		Title	Director	Cast	Genre	Notes
J U L	8	Tor Karone Beche Achi	M B Manik	Shakib Khan, Apu Biswas	Drama	
A U G U S T	31	Jaan Kurbaan	M B Manik	Shakib Khan, Apu Biswas	Action, romance	
A U G U S T	31	Gariber Bhai	P A Kajal	Mamnun Hasan Emon, Dipjol, Resi, Romana, Zayed Khan, Shakiba	Drama	
A U G U S T	31	Kusum Kusum Prem	Mushfiqur Rahman Guljar	Riaz, Ferdous Ahmed, Moushumi	Romance	Premiered on Channel i
A U G U S T	31	Tiger Number One	Shahin Sumon	Shakib Khan, Amit Hasan, Sahara, Nipun Akter	Action, romance	
A U G U S T	31	Ekbar Bolo Bhalobashi	Badiul Alam Khokon	Shakib Khan, Apu Biswas, Toma Mirza	Action, romance	
S E P T E M B E R	1	Amar Prithibi Tumi	Gazi Mahbub	Mamnun Hasan Emon, Dipjol, Sahara, Zayed Khan, Resi	Romance	
S E P T E M B E R	2	Dui Purush	Chashi Nazrul Islam	Riaz, Moushumi, Nipun Akter	Drama	Premiered on ATN Bangla
S E P T E M B E R	23	Bhool	Raju Ahmed	Shimla, Mehran, Achol		
S E P T E M B E R	30	Angko	Shahin Sumon	Kazi Maruf, Mamnun Hasan Emon, Dipjol, Sahara, Ratna		
S E P T E M B E R	30	Champa Ranir Akhra	Swapan Chowdury			

== October–December ==
Opening		Title	Director	Cast	Genre	Notes
O C T O B E R	7	Bailey Road	Masud Kainat	Niloy Alamgir, Achol	Romance	
O C T O B E R	7	Ek Takar Chele Koti Takar Meye	Kamol Sarker	Kazi Maruf, Shomrat, Sahara, Ratna	Action	
O C T O B E R	7	Garments Konna	G Sarker	Mamnun Hasan Emon, Popy	Action, romance	
O C T O B E R	14	Moner Ghore Boshot Kore	Jakir Hossain Raju	Shakib Khan, Apu Biswas		
N O V E M B E R	7	Boss Number One	Mohammad Hossain	Shakib Khan, Sahara, Nipun Akter	Romance	
N O V E M B E R	7	Chotto Songshar	Montazur Rahman Akbar	Kazi Maruf, Dipjol, Resi, Toma Mirza	Romance	
N O V E M B E R	7	Bondhu Tumi Amar	Nazrul Islam	Riaz, Purnima	Romance	
N O V E M B E R	7	Priya Amar Jaan	Raju Chowdhury	Shakib Khan, Apu Biswas	Romance	
N O V E M B E R	7	King Khan	Mohammad Hossain Jemmy	Shakib Khan, Apu Biswas, Mimo	Action, romance	
N O V E M B E R	7	Projapoti	Mohammad Mostafa Kamal Raz	Moushumi, Zahid Hasan, Mosharraf Karim, Sohel Khan, Kochi Khondokar	Drama, thriller	
D E C E M B E R	2	Nishiddho Rashta		Alexandar Bo, Shaila		
D E C E M B E R	2	Ke Apon Ke Por	Shahin Shumon	Apu Biswas, Amit Hasan	Action, romance	
D E C E M B E R	9	Pita Putrer Golpo	Kazi Hayat	Kazi Maruf, Sahara, Kazi Hayat, Misha Sawdagor, Habib Khan		
D E C E M B E R	9	Sathi Hara Nagin	Delowar Jahan Jhantu	Amin Khan, Sahara		
D E C E M B E R	16	Hridoy Bhanga Dheu	Gazi Mazharul Anwar	Ananta Jalil, Barsha	Action, romance	
D E C E M B E R	16	Ma er Gaaye Biyer Sharee	A K Sohel	Jidan, Shimla, Dighi, Ahmed Sharif	Drama	
D E C E M B E R	30	Adorer Jamai	Shahadat Hossain Liton	Shakib Khan, Apu Biswas, Nipun Akter	Action, comedy	

== See also ==
- List of Bangladeshi films of 2012
- List of Bangladeshi films
- Cinema of Bangladesh
