= List of Bangladeshi films of 2009 =

This is a list of Bangladeshi films that were released in 2009.

== Releases ==
Opening	Title	Director	Cast	Genre	Notes	Ref.
	Jagat Songshar	Raihan Mujib	Manna, Popy, Dighi, Omar Sani, Mukti			
9 January	Ke Ami - Who Am I	Wakil Ahmed	Riaz, Purnima, Ilias Kanchan, Aliraj	Western, drama		
23 January	Tumi Ki Shei	Abul Kalam Azad	Ferdous Ahmed, Keya, Ratna, Nasir Khan, Khalil, Rehana Jolly	Romance		
	Shramik Neta	Kazi Hayat				
	Bhul Shob E Bhul	Mayeen Biswas				
	Vondo Nayok	Shahadat Hossain Liton	Alexandar Bo, Sahara, Amit Hasa, Misha Sawdagor	Action		
	Abhishapto Raat		Sahara			
	Jibon Niye Juddho	Niranjan Biswas	Manna, Shabnur, Omar Sani			
30 January	Rupantor - Transformation	Abu Sayeed	Ferdous Ahmed, Sakiba, Shatabdi Wadud, Jayanto Chattopadhyay			
	Tumi Amar Swami	Montazur Rahman Akbar	Riaz, Shabnur			
	Miah Barir Chakor	Shahadat Hossain Liton	Shakib Khan, Apu Biswas			
13 February	Monpura	Giasuddin Selim	Chanchal Chowdhury, Farhana Mili, Monir Khan Shimul, Fazlur Rahman Babu, Mamunur Rashid	Romance, drama		
	Boner Jonno Juddho	Swapan Chowdhury	Amin Khan, Nipun Akter			
	Aain Er Haate Greftar					
	Bondhu Maya Lagaiche	Abu Sufiyan	Saif Khan, Nipun Akter			
	Hridoy Theke Pawa	Mohammad Hossain Jamie	Manna, Moushumi, Champa			
26 June	Moynamotir Songshar	Ali Azad	Ferdous Ahmed, Moushumi, Jhumur			
20 March	Jonmo Tomar Jonno	Shahin Sumon	Shakib Khan, Apu Biswas, Rahul, Priya, Rehana Jolly	Action, romance		
3 April	Mon Boshena Porar Table E	Abdul Mannan	Riaz, Shabnur, ATM Shamsuzzaman, Dolly Jahur	Comedy, romance		
17 July	Footpath Er Shahenshah					
	Chander Moto Bou	Mohammad Hossain	Riaz, Shabnur, Nipun	Romance		
	Shuvo Bibahao	Debashish Biswas	Riaz, Apu Biswas, Nipun	Romance, comedy		
	Gariber Chele Boroloker Meye		Kazi Maruf, Apu Biswas			
	Return Ticket	Sohel Rana	Rubel, Jona, Nipun Akter, Imtiaz, Shraboni, Sujata, Humayun Faridi, Sohel Rana, ATM Shasuzaman			
8 May	Bolbo Kotha Bashor Ghore	Shah Mohammad Shongram	Shakib Khan, Shabnur, Sahara, Omar Sani, Kazi Hayat	Drama, romance		
	Opare Akash	Shafiqul Islam Sohel	Ferdous Ahmed, Popy, Moushumi, Sadia	Romance		
22 May	Prithibi Takar Golam	Md. Jainal Abedin	Amin Khan, Apu Biswas, Omar Sani, ATM Shamsuzzaman, Khaleda Akter Kolpona, Prabir Mitra	Action, drama		
	Bodhu Tumi Kar	B. R. Chowdhury	Riaz, Shabnur			
5 June	Biye Bari	Shahin Sumon	Shakib Khan, Romana, Amit Hasan, Razzak, Bobita	Comedy, drama, romance		
12 June	Thekao Andolon	Raju Chowdhury	Amin Khan, Nipun Akter, Amit Hasan	Action		
19 June	Prem Koyedi	M B Manik	Shakib Khan, Sahara, Shahid Khan, Madhobi, Prabir Mitra	Action, romance		
	Nil Achol	Bulbul Jilani	Taufiq, Resi, Hira		Resi's debut film	
	Ma Boro Na Bou Boro	Sheikh Nazrul Islam	Amin Khan, Nipun Akter, Aliraj, Dolly Zahur			
3 July	Ebadat	ATM Shamsuzzaman	Riaz, Shabnur, Dolly Jahur, ATM Shamsuzzaman, Prabir Mitra	Comedy, drama, romance		
3 July	Mon Jekhane Hridoy Sekhane	Shahin Sumon	Shakib Khan, Apu Biswas, Nirab Hossain, Bobita, Misha Sawdagor	Romance	Nirab's debut film	
17 July	Swami Stirhir Wadah	P A Kajol	Shakib Khan, Shabnur, Romana, Khalil, Omar Sani	Drama, romance		
	Bhalobeshe Bou Anbo	Chandan Chowdhury	Riaz, Shabnur, Sahara			
11 September	Britter Bairey - Beyond the Circle	Golam Rabbani Biplob	Jayanta Chattopadhyay, Fazlur Rahman Babu, Firoz Kabir Dollar, Shahidul Alam Shacchu	Drama		
21 September	Mayer Haate Beheshter Chabi	F I Manik	Dipjol, Shakib Khan, Apu Biswas, Anwara, Omar Sani	Drama, romance		
21 September	Jaan Amar Jaan	M B Manik	Shakib Khan, Apu Biswas, Suchorita	Romance		
21 September	Oh Sathii Re	Shafi Iqbal	Shakib Khan, Apu Biswas, Bapparaj, Danny Sidak	Romance		
21 September	Bolo Na Kobul	Shahadat Hossain Liton	Shakib Khan, Apu Biswas	Comedy, romance		
21 September	Shaheb Naame Golam	Raju Chowdhury	Shakib Khan, Sahara, Nirab Hossain, Resi, Omar Sani, Moushumi	Action, drama		
21 September	Aain Boro Na Shontan Boro	A J Rana	Kazi Maruf, Nipun Akter	Action, drama		
	Rastar Chele	Shahin Sumon	Kazi Maruf, Resi, Mamnun Hasan Emon, Sahara	Action, romance		
16 October	Sobai To Bhalobasha Chay	Delowar Jahan Jhantu	Bapparaj, Mamnun Hasan Emon, Purnima, Razzak, Bobita	Romance		
16 October	Bhalobashar Sesh Nai	Reza Latif	Shomrat, Nipun Akter, Sahara, Razzak, Aman	Romance		
23 October	Mon Diyechi Tomake	Abdur Razzak	Shomrat, Sahara, Resi, Nirab Hossain, Razzak	Romance		
23 October	Bhalobashar Lal Golap	Mohammad Hossain Jamie	Shakib Khan, Apu Biswas, Purnima, Bobita, Kazi Hayat	Romance		
30 October	Chirodin Ami Tomar	F I Manik	Riaz, Purnima, Romana	Romance		
30 October	Mrittur Faade	Anwar Chowdhury Jibon	Amin Khan, Nodi	Action		
	Adorer Choto Bhai	Sultan Badol	Masum Parvez Rubel, Jona, ATM Shamsuzzaman			
13 November	Sobar Upore Tumi	F I Manik	Shakib Khan, Swastika Mukharjee	Drama, romance	Indo-Bangladesh co-production film	
13 November	Priyotomeshu	Morshedul Islam	Sohana Saba, Arman Parvez Murad, Humayun Faridi, Afsana Mimi, Tauquir Ahmed, Mamunur Rashd	Drama		
28 November	Gangajatra	Syed Wahiduzzaman Diamond	Ferdous Ahmed, Popy, Shimla	Drama		
28 November	Kajer Manush	Montazur Rahman Akbar	Dipjol, Resi, Romana, Zayed Khan, Sahara, Shomrat, Razzak	Drama		
	Mone Boro Kosto	Shahin Sumon	Shakib Khan, Apu Biswas, Nirab Hossain, Keya			
20 September	Amar Praner Priya	Jakir Hossain Raju	Shakib Khan, Bidya Sinha Mim	Romance		
28 November	Bhalobasha Dibi Kina Bol	Uttam Akash	Shakib Khan, Apu Biswas, Amit Hasan, Shiba Banu	Romance		
11 December	Third Person Singular Number	Mostofa Sarwar Farooki	Nusrat Imroz Tisha, Mosharraf Karim, Topu, Abul Hayat	Drama		
	Mon Chuyeche Mon	Mostafizur Rahman Manik	Riaz, Shabnur, Jona	Romance		
18 December	Guru Bhai	A Q Khokon	Nirab Hossain, Resi			
25 December	Piritir Agun Jole Digun	P A Kajol	Mamnun Hasan Emon, Shabnur, Afsana Ara Bindu, Razzak	Romance		

== See also ==
- List of Bangladeshi films of 2010
- List of Bangladeshi films
