= Moner Jala =

2011 Bangladeshi film directed by Malek Afsari

- Movie poster
- Directed by: Malek Afsari
- Written by: Kashem Ali Dulal
- Produced by: Taposhi Thakur
- Starring: Shakib Khan; Apu Biswas; Misha Sawdagor; Bobita; Mizu Ahmed
- Music by: Ali Akram Shuvo
- Production company: Heartbeat Production
- Distributed by: Heartbeat Production
- Release date: 22 April 2011
- Running time: 144 minutes
- Country: Bangladesh
- Language: Bengali

Moner Jala (Bengali: মনের জ্বালা; transl. Burning Heart) is a 2011 Dhallywood action thriller film. The film was directed by Malek Afsari and produced by Taposhi Thakur under the banner of Heartbeat Production. It features Shakib Khan and Apu Biswas in the lead roles. It was Shakib Khan's first film of 2011. The film was released internationally as Moner Jala: Most Wanted. Shakib Khan made his debut as a playback singer with the film.

== Cast ==
- Shakib Khan as Chad / Rasel
- Apu Biswas as Chandni
- Misha Sawdagor as Jafar
- Bobita as Rabeya, Judge and Chad's mother
- Mizu Ahmed as Abbas, Chandni's father
- Kabila as Majnu, Chad's childhood friend
- Sanko Panja as Sadek, Jafar's father
- Nagma as Nargis, Chandni's paternal aunt (special appearance)
- Ilias Kobra as (special appearance)

== Crew ==
- Director — Malek Afsary
- Producer — Taposhi Thakur
- Music — Ali Akram Shuvo
- Written — Kashem Ali Dulal
- Lyrics — Moniruzzaman Monir and Kabir Bokul
- Distributor — Heartbeat Production

== Technical details ==
- Format — 35MM (Color)
- Real — 13;Pans
- Released Year — 2010
- Technical Support — Bangladesh Film Development Corporation (BFDC)

== Soundtrack ==
Moner Jala

Soundtrack album by Ali Akram Shuvo
- Released: 2011
- Venue: Anupam Recording Media
- Genre: Feature film soundtrack
- Length: 18:33
- Language: Bengali
- Label: Heartbeat Production
- Producer: Ali Akram Shuvo

Ali Akram Shuvo chronology
Bolona Tumi Amar (2010)	Moner Jala (2011)	Jaan Kurbaan (2011)

The film's soundtrack album is composed by Ali Akram Shuvo and one of its songs is written by Moniruzzaman Monir and the rest of songs are written by Kabir Bakul. Seven years after the release of the film, on August 8, 2018, all the songs of the film were released on Anupam Recording Media's YouTube channel. Shakib Khan made his debut as a playback singer in the film with the song "Ami Chokh Tule Takale".

Track listing
No.	Title	Lyrics	Singer(s)	Length
1.	"Ami Chokh Tule Takalei (আমি চোখ তুলে তাকালেই)"	Kabir Bakul	Shakib Khan	4:29
2.	"Eid Mubarak"	Kabir Bakul	Kumar Bishwajit	4:58
3.	"Dil Ki Doya Hoyna (দিল কি দয়া হয়না)"	Moniruzzaman Monir	S I Tutul	4:33
4.	"O Premi (ও প্রেমি)"	Kabir Bakul	S I Tutul, Doly Sayontoni	4:36
Total length:				18:33
