= List of Bangladeshi films of 2012 =

This is a list of Bangladeshi films that were released in 2012.

== January–March ==
Opening		Title	Director	Cast	Genre	Notes
J A N U A R Y	20	Firey Esho Behula	Tanim Noor	Joya Ahsan, Intekhab Dinar, Humayun Faridi, Mamunur Rashid, Jayanta Chattapaddhay, Raisul Islam Asad, Shahiduzzaman Selim, Tauquir Ahmed, Shatabdi Wadud	Drama	
J A N U A R Y	20	Maruf er Challenge	Shahadat Hossain Liton	Sahara, Mamnun Hasan Emon, Nipun Akter, Kazi Maruf	Action	
J A N U A R Y	27	Rokte Bheja Bangladesh	Nadim Mahmud	Shadhin, Ratna, Prabir Mitra, Misha Sawdagor	Drama	
F E B R U A R Y	3	I Love You	Mushfiqur Rahman Guljar	Shakib Khan, Purnima, Resi, Nirab, Ilias Kanchan	Romance	
F E B R U A R Y	10	Jibone Tumi Morone Tumi	Apurba Rana	Jeff, Shreya, Sohel Rana	Romance	
F E B R U A R Y	17	Lal Tip	Swapan Ahmed	Mamnun Hasan Emon, Kusum Sikder, Benjamin Dupich, ATM Shamsuzzaman, Ana Levis, Sohel Khan	Romance, drama	
F E B R U A R Y	24	Ek Jonomer Koster Prem	Nadim Mahmud	Saif Khan, Nodi, Swapna, Shoyeb Khan	Action, romance	
M A R C H	2	Amar Challenge	Badiul Alam Khokon	Shakib Khan, Sahara, Misha Sawdagor	Action, romance	
M A R C H	9	Raja Surjo Kha	Gazi Mahbub	Kazi Maruf, Purnima, Sohel Rana, Bobita, Kabori, Nirab	Drama	
M A R C H	16	Palabar Path Nei	Apurba Rana	Saif Khan, Toma Mirza, Aman, Kazi Hayat	Action	
M A R C H	16	Bangladeshi	Monowar Khokon	Jahangir Jhinuk, Enamul Mozammel, Ahmed Sharif	Action	
M A R C H	23	Ek Takar Denmohor	M B Manik	Shakib Khan, Apu Biswas, Sohel Rana, Suchorita	Romance	
M A R C H	26	Karigor	Anwar Shahadat	Jayanta Chattapaddhay, Rokeya Prachi, Rani Sarkar, Masud Alam Babu	Drama	

== April–June ==
Opening		Title	Director	Cast	Genre	Notes
A P R I L	1	Manik Ratan Dui Bhai	Kazi Hayat	Kazi Maruf, Dipjol, Resi, Toma Mirza	Comedy, romance	
A P R I L	13	Ji Hujur	Jakir Hossain Raju	Symon Sadik, Sara Zerin, Anan	Comedy, romance	
A P R I L	20	Ek Mon Ek Pran	Sohanur Rahman Sohan	Shakib Khan, Toma Mirza, Apu Biswas	Romance	
A P R I L	27	Antore Premer Jala	Kalam Kaisar	Sajid Khan, Shehnai	Romance	
M A Y	4	Bazarer Kuli	Montazur Rahman Akbar	Resi, Nipun Akter, Aman, Anna, Misha Sawdagor, Dipjol	Action	
M A Y	8	Charulata	Saiful Islam Mannu	Ilias Kanchan, Kumkum Hasan, Shajal, Mita Noor		Premiered only on Channel i
M A Y	11	The Speed	Sohanur Rahman Sohan	Ananta Jalil, Parveen, Nana, Dighi, Parveen Sultana Diti, Alamgir, Nino	Action, romance	
M A Y	11	Uttarer Sur	Shahnewaz Kakoli	Utpal, Lucy, Meghla	Drama	Premiered on 14 April on ATN Bangla
M A Y	18	Bangla Bhai	Monowar Khokon	Zayed Khan, Chandni		
M A Y	25	Attogopon	M M Sarkar	Zayed Khan, Shabnur	Romance	
M A Y	25	Bhalobasha St. Martins e	Shahidul Islam Khokon	Rashed Morshed, Shabnur		
J U N E	1	O Amar Desher Mati	Ananta Hira	Amin Khan, Toma Mirza, Nuna Afroz		
J U N E	1	Pagla Hawa	Nazrul Islam Khan	Kazi Maruf, Shreya, Habib Khan, Kazi Hayat		
J U N E	8	Sontaner Moto Sontan	Shahin Sumon	Shakib Khan, Sahara, Amit Hasan, Ratna		
J U N E	22	Common Gender	Noman Rabin	Sohel Khan, Hasan Masood, Reza Siddqui, Rashed Mamun, Rosy Siddiqui	Drama	

== July–September ==
Opening		Title	Director	Cast	Genre	Notes
A U G U S T	20	Most Welcome	Anonno Mamun	Ananta Jalil, Barsha, Sneha Ullal, Razzak, Bapparaj	Romance, action	
A U G U S T	20	Khodar Pore Ma	Shahin Sumon	Shakib Khan, Sahara, Bobita		
A U G U S T	20	My Name Is Sultan	F I Manik	Shakib Khan, Sahara, Prabir Mitra, Rina Khan	Action, romance	
A U G U S T	20	Dhakar King	Shafi Uddin Shafi	Shakib Khan, Nipun Akter, Apu Biswas	Action	
A U G U S T	20	Se Amar Mon Kereche	Sohanur Rahman Sohan	Shakib Khan, Tinni, Almgir, Misha Sawdagor	Romance	
A U G U S T	20	Tumi Ashbe Bole	Ashraful Rahman	Nirab Hossain, Nipun Akter	Romance	
A U G U S T	20	Hothat Sedin	Basu Chatterjee	Ferdous Ahmed, Ridhima Ghosh, Nipun	Romance	Indo-Bangladesh coproduction film
A U G U S T	20	Attodan	Shahjahan Chowdury	Nirab Hossain, Nipun Akter, Alamgir, Champa		
S E P	7	Ghetuputra Kamola	Humayun Ahmed	Mamun, Tariq Anam Khan, Agun, Jayanta Chattopadhyay, Munmun Ahmed	Drama	
S E P	21	Durdhorsho Premik	M B Manik	Shakib Khan, Apu Biswas, Misha Sawdagor		

== October–December ==
Opening		Title	Director	Cast	Genre	Notes
O C T O B E R	5	Bhalobashar Rong	Shahin Sumon	Mahiya Mahi, Bappy Chowdhury, Razzak, Amit Hasan	Romance	
O C T O B E R	27	Ziddi Mama	Shahadat Hossain Liton	Shakib Khan, Apu Biswas, Romana, Misha Sawdagor		
O C T O B E R	27	Buk Fatey To Mukh Foteyna	Badiul Alam Khokon	Shakib Khan, Apu Biswas, Romana, Sohel Rana, Misha Sawdagor		
O C T O B E R	27	Don Number One	Badiul Alam Khokon	Shakib Khan, Sahara, Misha Sawdagor	Romance, action	
O C T O B E R	27	Swami Bhaggo	F I Manik	Dipjol, Resi, Amin Khan, Dighi, Romana		
O C T O B E R	27	Jiddi Bou	Abul Kalam Azad	Shabnur, Ferdous, Prabir Mitra, ATM Shamsuzzaman, Taufiq		Premiered only on Channel i
O C T O B E R	28	Shiulimoni	Sadeq Siddqui	Mamnun Hasan Emon, Nipun Akter, Anna		Premiered only on ATN Bangla
N O V	16	Love in Jungle	D Hossain	Danny Sidak, Ilias Kobra, Papia		
N O V	16	Sontrashi Dhoro	Swapan Chowdhury	Sohel, Jui, Alexandar Bo		
N O V	23	Obujh Prem	Abul Khair Bulbul	Arju, Sinthia		
D E C E M B E R	14	Tomar Shukh E Amar Shukh	Kalam Kaisar	Chandni, Shuvo, Khaleda Aktar Kolpona		
D E C E M B E R	21	Chorabali	Redoan Rony	Joya Ahsan, Indraneil Sengupta, Sohel Rana, ATM Shamsuzzaman, Shahiduzzaman Selim	Crime, thriller	
D E C E M B E R	28	Pita - The Father	Masud Akhand	Jayanta Chattapaddhay, Shaina Amin, Kallyan, Masud Akhand Maria Farih upama, moin durrani, Armand Ara Bokul	War, drama	
D E C E M B E R	28	Nayori	Mohammad Amin	Amin Khan, Chowa, Rashed Khan, Amal Bose, Ali Raz		

== See also ==
- List of Bangladeshi films
- Dhallywood
