= Naghma =

Naghma or Nagma is an Arabic feminine given name, meaning a song, and may refer to:

- Nagma (born 1974), Indian politician and former actress
- Naghma (singer), Afghan singer Shahpari or Shahpary (born 1964)
- Naghma (Pakistani actress) (born 1945)
- Nagma (Bangladeshi actress) (c. 1975–2015)
- Nagma Mallick (born 1967), Indian diplomat and ambassador
- Naghma Mushtaq (born 1968), Pakistani politician
