= Suraiya (film) =

2020 Bengali short film

- Directed by: Anirudho Rasel
- Screenplay by: Sajol Ahmed and Anirudho Rasel
- Story by: Kuldip Nayar
- Starring: Shahiduzzaman Selim Shiba Ali Khan
- Edited by: Shameem Ahmed
- Production company: Vertex production House
- Release date: 16 January 2020 (Dhaka)
- Running time: 27 minutes
- Country: Bangladesh
- Language: Bengali

Suraiya is a 2020 Bengali short film directed by Anirudho Rasel with Shahiduzzaman Selim and Shiba Ali Khan playing the lead roles. This film is based on true events that occurred during the 1947 partition of India and Pakistan. The story is inspired by a Sikh woman during the partition of India and Pakistan in Rawalpindi and the main story was written by Kuldip Nayar.

== Plot ==
This film is based on the story of Suraiya, a Sikh woman, during the 1947 partition between India and Pakistan. Suraiya had lost her parents, sister and brother during the 1947 partition. She stayed in Rawalpindi by taking shelter in a Muslim family's home. She converted to Islam from Hindu. Later, the Authority of Madrasa decided to give her a chance to join as a teacher in Madrasa.

Senior teacher Ibrahim was impressed by Suraiya and proposed to her father to marry her. Their conjugal life was running well, and Suraiya gave birth to a son named Omar. However, their situation changed when Suraiya's brother came from India to look for her. Then, it was found out that Suraiya was a Sikh, and she lost all respect. Suraiya could handle her outside situation but could not handle her own home because Omar could not accept Suraiya as his mother and he started to hate her because she was a Sikh.

Suraiya lost all hope and decided to sacrifice her life.

== Cast ==
- Shiba Ali Khan as Suraiya, based on the character of Sikh women during 1947 partition between India and Pakistan.
- Shahiduzzaman Selim as Ibrahim, an artist and Suraiya's husband.
- Imon as Suraiya's son.
- A. K. Azad Setu as Suraiya's brother.

== Release ==
The film premiered during the 2020 Dhaka International Film Festival. It was released on the BeBop Channel in 2020.
