= Bolona Tumi Amar =

2010 Bangladeshi romance film

- Movie poster
- Directed by: M B Manik
- Written by: Kashem Ali Dulal
- Screenplay by: M B Manik
- Produced by: Khorshed Alam Khosru
- Starring: Shakib Khan; Anika Kabir Shokh; Nirob; Toma Mirza; Misha Sawdagor
- Cinematography: Asaduzzaman Mojnu
- Edited by: Jinnat Hossain
- Music by: Ali Akram Shuvo
- Production company: Apurbo Kothachitro
- Distributed by: Apurbo Kothachitro
- Release date: 22 October 2010
- Running time: 166 minutes
- Country: Bangladesh
- Language: Bengali
- Budget: ৳1 crore (equivalent to ৳2.6 crore or US$210,000 in 2024)
- Box office: ৳1.5 crore (equivalent to ৳3.9 crore or US$320,000 in 2024)

Bolona Tumi Amar (Note: Bengali: বলোনা তুমি আমার; transl. Just Tell Me, You're Mine) is a 2010 Bangladeshi romance film. The film was directed by M B Manik, produced by Khorshed Alam Khosru and written by Kashem Ali Dulal, with screenplay by M B Manik. It features Shakib Khan, along with an ensemble cast that includes Anika Kabir Shokh, Nirob, Toma Mirza, Misha Sawdagor, Nuton, Suchorita, Prabir Mitra, Subrata and Rebeka Rouf.

The film marked the debut of Anika Kabir Shokh and Tama Mirza. The 35mm-film was shot mainly in Bangkok, Thailand. Its filming ended under the tentative title Tomake Chara Bachbo Naa, but the title of the film was later changed due to a film being released with the synonymous title of Tumi Chara Bachi Naa. The film's soundtrack was composed by Ali Akram Shuvo, while editing was done by Jinnat Hossain and cinematography was done by Asaduzzaman Mojnu. It has become one of the most commercially successful films of 2010, being successful at the box office.

== Plot ==
One of the city's biggest gangsters Sadek Shikder wants to marry Anjali Khan. Anjali Khan's father Zafar Khan sent her to Bangkok, Thailand, fearing Sadek Shikder. Sagar cames to Bangkok with money loaned by his uncle and stays in there for two years. Ever since his business partner ran away with ৳20 lakh, he earns a living by driving a taxi. When Sagor is reunited with his cheating partner, he recovers US$20,000. After paying off her uncle's debt, Anjali comes to Bangkok and is rescued by Sagor, when she falls into hijackers' trap. Meanwhile, Sadek Shikder's men came to Bangkok to look for Anjali. Sagor hands Anjali over to them in exchange for money, but when Sagor changes his mind, he rescues Anjali from them again. But one of Sadek Shikder's gang is killed by Sagor, when he comes to rescue Anjali. Sagor returned to the country fearing to be caught by the police. He came and saw that his uncle was being arrested for not returning ৳20 lakhs to the bank. Sadek Shikder offers Sagor a contract of ৳20 lakh to bring back Anjali to the country. Sagor goes back to Bangkok and falls in true love with Anjali.

== Cast ==
- Shakib Khan as Shah Mohammad Sagor Chowdhury
- Anika Kabir Shokh as Anjali Khan
- Nirob as Akash
- Toma Mirza as Moon
- Misha Sawdagor as Sadek Shikder
- Nuton
- Suchorita
- Prabir Mitra as Zafar Khan
- Subrata
- Rebeka Rouf
- Ilias Kobra
- Parvez Gangua
- Kala Aziz
- Keya Chowdhury
- Rajkomol

== Soundtrack ==
Bolona Tumi Amar

Soundtrack album by Ali Akram Shuvo
- Released: 2010
- Recorded: 2009
- Studio: Apurbo Kothachitro
- Length: 22:19
- Label: Anupam Recording Media
- Producers: Ali Akram Shuvo; Khorshed Alam Khosru

Ali Akram Shuvo chronology
Nissash Amar Tumi (2010)	Bolona Tumi Amar (2010)	Boss Number One (2011)
External media
Audio
- Audio jukebox on YouTube
Video
- Video jukebox on YouTube

The soundtrack of the film is composed by Ali Akram Shuvo. There are 5 songs in this soundtrack. The lyrics of these songs are penned by Kabir Bakul and Maniruzzaman Monir respectively, while Sabina Yasmin, Monir Khan, S.I. Tutul, Polash, Mila Islam, Asif Akbar and Dolly Sayontoni

All lyrics are written by Kabir Bakul and Moniruzzaman Monir; all music is composed by Ali Akram Shuvo.

No.	Title	Singer(s)	Length
1.	"Ei Mone Baro Mash"	S.I. Tutul, Mila Islam	4:29
2.	"Anjali Deho Theke"	Polash	4:23
3.	"Tomar Choke Dekhi"	Sabina Yasmin, Monir Khan	4:54
4.	"Beautiful Beautiful"	Asif Akbar, Dolly Sayontoni	3:58
5.	"Buke Ache Koto Betha"	S.I Tutul	4:35
Total length:			22:19

== Release and reception ==
The film was released nationwide on 22 October 2010. Upon release, the film was well received by audiences and critics alike, with debutant Anika Kabir Shokh's eloquent performance particularly appreciated. The film grossed ৳1.5 crore against a budget of ৳1 crore. Prothom Alo in its year review referred to the film as a 'super-duper hit' at the time.
