= Mridula Ahmed Racy =

Bangladeshi actress

- মৃদুলা আহমেদ রেসি
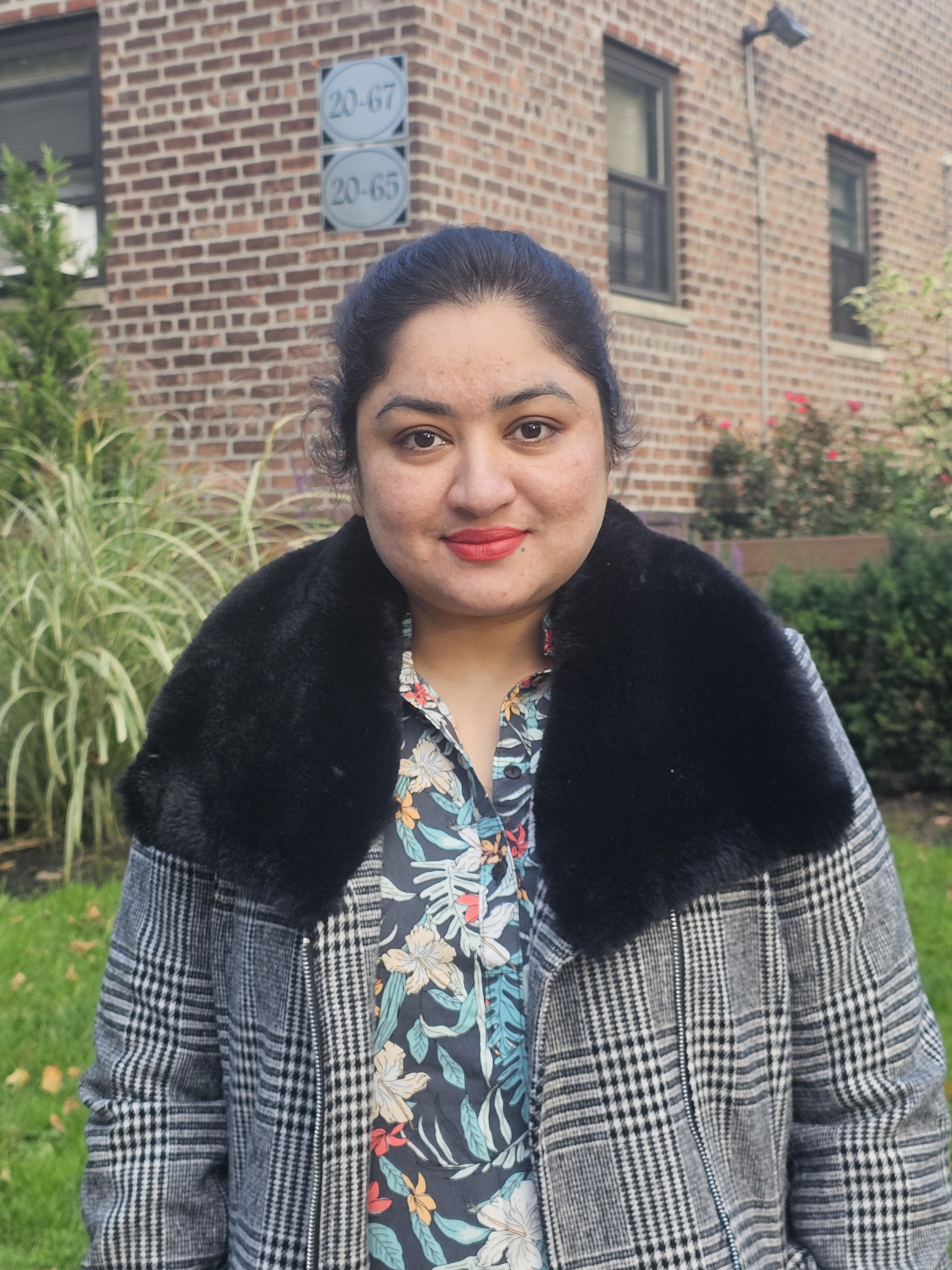
- Racy in 2022
- Born: Racy; 24 February
- Occupations: Film actress, businessperson, television anchor, dancer
- Years active: 20 years
- Children: 2
- Awards: full list

Mridula Ahmed Racy (born 24 February), known by her stage name Racy, is a Bangladeshi actress, business person and television anchor. Since 2000 to present she is an enlisted artist of BTV.

Starting her film career with film Nil Achol, she quickly became one of leading actresses in Dhallywood with films such as Abujh Shishu, Eri Nam Valobasha, Ek Joban, Chehara, Kajer Manush, Bazarer Kuli, Chehara Vondo 2, Choto Songshar, Amar Shopno Amar Shongshar, Goriber Bhai, Rickshawaler Chele, & Mayer Chokh. Her notable films as a supporting actress include Amar Bukher Moddhe Kahane, Amar Prithibhi Tumi, , Shaheb Name Golam, Mon Diyechi Tomay, Amar Prithibhi Tumi, & Mayer Chokh.

== Early life ==
Mridula Ahmed was born on 24 February.

== Career ==
Her first commercial film appearance was in Nil Achol in 2004. She acted in about 40 other films, including Abujh Shishu, Eri Nam Valobasha, Ek Joban, Chehara, Swami Bhagya, and Amar Sbapna Amar Ahankar, until the birth of her daughter in July 2013, after which she took a long break.

In 2017, she performed in the film Shunya. In 2020, Racy finished shooting Yes Madam.

Also in 2020, Racy started her beauty salon business in Dhaka.

== Personal life ==
On 22 June 2012 Racy married Md. Toufiqul Islam Pantha. They have two daughters, Radwa Islam (born 2013) and Raowa Islam (born 2016).

== Filmography ==
| Year | Title | Co-artist | Director | Release date | Ref |
|---|---|---|---|---|---|
| 2007 | Kapal | Shakib Khan, Shabnur, Mahfuz Ahmed | Hasibul Islam Mizan | 14 Oct 2007 | |
| 2008 | Abujh Shishu | Manna, Moushumi | Shafiqul Islam Bhairavi | 22 Feb 2008 | |
| 2008 | Eri Nam Valobasha | Ferdous | Niranjan Biswas | 11 Jan 2008 | |
| 2008 | Amar Jaan Amar Pran | Shakib Khan, Apu Biswas | Sohanur Rahman Sohan | 8 Dec 2008 | |
| 2009 | Neel Achol | Tawfiq | Bulbul Zilani Chowdhury | 19 June 2009 | |
| 2009 | Shaheb Name Golam | Shakib Khan, Moushumi, Sahara, Nirab | Raju Chowdhury | 21 Sept 2009 | |
| 2009 | Rastar Chele | Mamnun Hasan Emon, Sahara, Kazi Maruf | Wajed Ali Sumon, Shahin | 9 Oct 2009 | |
| 2009 | Kajer Manush | Dipjol, Sahara, Aman, Ratna, Zayed Khan, Razzak | Montazur Rahman Akbar | | |
| 2009 | Guru Bhai | Nirab Hossain, Helal Khan, Nipun | AQ Khokon | | |
| 2009 | Mon Diyechi Tomake | Samraat, Sahara, Nirab Hossain | Nayak Raj Razzak | | |
| 2010 | Ek Joban | Dipjol | F I Manik | 19 Nov 2010 | |
| 2010 | Amar Swapno Amar Shongsar | Dipjol, Amin Khan, Purnima, Zayed Khan | F I Manik | 2 July 2010 | |
| 2010 | Mayer Chokh | Dipjol, Amin Khan, Purnima, Zayed Khan | Montazur Rahman Akbar | | |
| 2010 | Rikshawalar Chele | Dipjol | Montazur Rahman Akbar | | |
| 2010 | Bap Boro Na Shoshur Boro | Samrat, Nipun | Shahadat Hossain Liton | 13 Dec 2010 | |
| 2010 | 5 Takar Prem | Kazi Maruf, Mamnun Hasan Emon, Sahara | Wajed Ali Sumon, Shahin | 8 Jan 2010 | |
| 2010 | Chehara Vondo-2 | Shakib Khan | Shahidul Islam Khokon | | |
| 2010 | Amar Buker Moddho Khane | Shakib Khan, Apu Biswas | Shafi Uddin Shafi | | |
| 2011 | Chotto Sangsar | Dipjol, Kazi Maruf, Toma Mirza | Montazur Rahman Akbar | 7 Nov 2011 | |
| 2011 | Goriber Bhai | Dipjol, Mamnun Hasan Emon, Rumana Khan | P. A. Kazol | 31 Aug 2011 | |
| 2011 | Amar Prithibi Tumi | Dipjol, Mamnun Hasan Emon, Sahara | Gazi Mahbub | 1 Sep 2011 | |
| 2012 | Bazarer Coolie | Dipjol, Nipun | Montazur Rahman Akbar | 4 May 2012 | |
| 2012 | Swami Bhagya | Dipjol, Amin Khan, Rumana Khan | F. I. Manik | 27 Oct 2012 | |
| 2012 | Manik Roton Dui Bhai | Dipjol, Kazi Maruf, Toma Mirza | Kazi Hayat | | |
| 2016 | Goriber Vai | Dipjol, Mamnun Hasan Emon, Rumana Khan | P. A. Kazol | | |
| 2017 | Shunya | Omar Sani | Bandhan Biswas | 24 March 2017 | |
| 2025 | Yes Madam | Shipan Mitra, Sabrina Sultana Keya, Amit Hasan, Mridula Ahmed Racy,Amaan Reza, Tanha Moumasi | Rokibul Alam Rokib | | |

== Awards ==
- Bangladesh Shishu Academy award in 1997-2001
- Jatio Sikkha Soptaho award
- Bangabandhu Shishu Kishore Mela award
- UNESCO cultural award (2000)
- Sheikh Russel Jatiyo Shishu Kishore award (2000)
- BCRA Award (2008)
- Index Media Performance Award
- Nandan Kala Kendra Award
- Rokomari Sangbad Star Award
- CJFB award
- 15th Sacco Telefilm Award (2014)
- Babisas Award (2016)
- Human Rights Peace Award (2017)
- TRUB Award (2022)
