= Shiba Ali Khan =

Bangladeshi Filmmaker, Actress, Cinematographer, Screenwriter & Author

- Born: 5 August 1991 (age 35); Munshigonj, Bangladesh
- Education: M.Eng (Electrical and Information Engineering)
- Alma mater: King Mongkut's University of Technology Thonburi University of Information Technology and Sciences
- Occupations: Film director; film producer; actress; writer
- Years active: 2009 – present

Shiba Ali Khan (Bengali: সিবা আলী খান) is a Bangladeshi filmmaker, actress, cinematographer, screenwriter and author who appears in Dhallywood films. After a successful career as a fashion model, she started her acting career in 2012. She acted in feature and short films. Her debut film released in 2015. She debuted as a filmmaker and screenwriter with her short film Hunger. She published her first book named 'Aatma'(‘আত্মা’) in Ekushey Book Fair 2023.

== Early life ==
She was born on August 5, 1991 in Munshigonj, Bangladesh. She lived in Munshigonj during her childhood. After that she moved to Dhaka. She Completed her BSc in Electrical & Electronics Engineering from University of Information Technology & Sciences in Bangladesh. She also Completed her MEng in Electrical & Information Engineering from King Mongkut's University of Technology Thonburi (KMUTT) in Thailand.

She completed professional courses in Screenplay & Direction and Cinematography from Pathshala South Asian Media Institute. She also studied Acting in Abdullah Al Mamun Theatre School. She completed her Diploma in Graphic Design from National Institute of Design.

== Career ==
She started her modelling career at the age of 17 as a runway model. She worked successfully as a model and then started her acting career in 2012. She acted in few feature films named The Story of Samara, Jamdani, Encounter, Operation Agneepath. She also acted in a short film named Suraiya which premiered in Dhaka International Film Festival in 2020.

As a filmmaker and screenwriter, She made her debut with the short film Hunger and won award in Best First Time Director (Short) Category in International World Film Awards. She directed several short films which won many awards in International Film Festivals.

She published her first book named Aatma (আত্মা) in Ekushey Book Fair 2023 which consists seven supernatural short stories. Her first novel is Joshna o Adharer Golpo (জোছনা ও আঁধারের গল্প) published in Ekushey Book Fair 2024.

== Books ==
- Aatma (আত্মা) (2023) ISBN 978-984-97212-0-8
- Joshna O Adharer Golpo (জোছনা ও আঁধারের গল্প) (2024) ISBN 978-984-98561-0-8
- Patalghorer Pishach (পাতালঘরের পিশাচ) (2025) ISBN 978-984-99919-8-4
- The Mountains Echo My Silence (2025) ISBN 978-984-35-7875-4
- Demons' Door (2025) ISBN 978-984-35-8678-0
- Neel Dhrubatara (নীল ধ্রুবতারা) (2026) ISBN 978-984-35-9116-6

== Filmography ==
=== As actress ===
Year	Film	Role	Notes and source
2012	Rajkumar	Chandramukhi	Drama Debut
2013	Beche Thak Valobasha		Drama
2015	The Story Of Samara	Anushka	Feature Film. Dhallywood Debut
2018	Operation Agneepath	Ruhana	Feature Film.
2020	Suraiya	Suraiya	Short Film.
2021	The Secret of 2521	Mehnaj Jeba	Web Film. Released in OTT Platform (ZEE5).
2023	Encounter	Khusi	Feature Film. (Filming)
2024	Jamdani	Alo	Feature Film.(Post Production)

=== As filmmaker ===
Year	Film	Contribution	Notes and source
2023	Hunger	Script, Direction	Short Film. Won Award in International World Film Awards in Best First Time Director (Short) Category.
2023	Jolil	Script, Direction	Short Film. Won Award in Best Women's Short Film Category in Nitiin International Film Festival.
2023	Nitu	Script, Direction	Short Film.
2023	Freedom	Script, Direction	A Silent Short Film.
2024	অনামা/Unnamed	Script, Direction	Short Film. Won Award in Best Women Filmmaker Category in Luleå International Film Festival.
2025	Unflourished	Script, Direction, Cinematography, Editing	Documentary Feature Film. Semifinalist in Stockholm City Film Festival.
2025	The Artisan	Script, Direction, Cinematography, Editing	Documentary Short Film.
2026	The Folk Theatre	Script, Direction, Cinematography, Editing	Documentary Short Film.(In Post-Production).

== Awards and nominations ==
Year	Awards	Category	Result
2010	Babisas Award	Best Runway Model	Won
2010	Binodondhara Performance Award	Best Runway Model	Won
2011	DCRU Showbiz Award	Model & Actress	Won
2011	Babisas Award	Best Runway Model	Won
2011	Trab Award	Best Runway Model	Won
2023	International World Film Awards	Best First Time Director (Short)	Won
2023	Luleå International Film Festival	Best Women Filmmaker	Won
2025	Tietê International Film Awards (T.I.F.A.)	Best Director	Won
2025	Tietê International Film Awards (T.I.F.A.)	Best Editing	Won
2025	Asian Talent International Film Festival	Best Female Director	Won

== See also ==
- Cinema of Bangladesh
