= Badsha Bulbul =

Musical artist (born 1964)

Badsha Bulbul বাদশা বুলবুল
- Born: 20 February 1964 (age 62); Pabna District, Bangladesh
- Instrument: Vocal
- Website: badshabulbul.com

Md. Sekandar Badsha Bulbul (Bengali: বাদশা বুলবুল; born 20 February 1964) is a Bangladeshi singer and musician known for his work in modern and folk music. He has released numerous albums and performed widely in Bangladesh and abroad.

== Early life ==
Badsha Bulbul was born on 20 February 1964 in Pabna, Bangladesh. He grew up in a musical family. His mother, Monowara Begum, was a singer, and his sisters Doly Sayontoni and Poly Sayontoni are also professional singers. Bulbul began singing at a young age, learning folk and classical traditions from his mother and participating in musical gatherings featuring Baul and other folk artists from the region.

As a child performer, he received early recognition, winning the National Child Artist Award in 1979 and 1980. He also performed internationally with a group of young artists, representing Bangladesh in neighboring countries.

== Career ==
Bulbul made his professional stage debut in 1981, and in 1991 he began regular performances on Bangladesh Television. His first album, featuring songs by Milton Khandaker, was released in 1986. Although it did not gain wide popularity initially, his 1995 album She Jeno Chiro Sukhi Hoye brought him significant attention.

Over his career, he has released around 18 solo albums and appeared on more than 150 mixed albums. He has worked with numerous notable composers and musicians, and his music spans both contemporary and traditional Bangladeshi styles. In addition to album releases, he has performed live in television programmes and international stage shows for expatriate Bangladeshi communities across the Middle East, Europe, North America, and Asia.

=== Musical style and works ===
Bulbul's repertoire includes a diverse range of songs, from heartfelt ballads to folk-inspired compositions. Some of his notable works include Shey Chilo Amar Priyotoma, Hridoyer Kobita, Bhanga Mon, and Ami Ashboi. His music has been featured on various digital platforms and continues to reach audiences through both traditional and online media.

== Works ==
Albums

- Shey Chilo Amar Priyotoma
- Shukhi Hote Chai Na
- Bhulte Cheyecchilam
- Bhule Jabo Ami Tomake
- Hridoyer Kobita
- Tobuo Prem Acche
- Bhanga Mon
- Je Amay Dukkho Dilo
- Ontore
- Mohona
- Ek Jonome Hoilona Piriti
- Ekdin Sondhay
- Piriti Amar Jonno Noy
- Bathar Shrabon
- Ami Ashboi

== Awards ==
- National Children's Award Competition (Folk Music) (1979) 1st Prize
- National Children's Award Competition (Folk Music) (1980) 1st Prize
- Jury Special Prize from Bangladesh Film Journalists Association Bachsas Awards (2005)
