= Operation Agneepath =

- Directed by: Ashiqur Rahman
- Screenplay by: Ashiqur Rahman
- Starring: Shakib Khan; Shiba Ali Khan; Misha Sawdagor
- Cinematography: Ashiqur Rahman
- Production company: Vertex Production
- Distributed by: Vertex Production; Cinefekt Entertainment; Live Technologies
- Country: Bangladesh
- Language: Bengali

Operation Agneepath (Bengali: অপারেশন অগ্নিপথ, lit. 'Operation Fire-path') is an unreleased Bangladeshi action thriller film directed by Ashiqur Rahman, produced under the banner of Vertex Production and Cinefekt Entertainment. It stars Shakib Khan, Shiba Ali Khan, Sayelaluddin Mahalder And Misha Sawdagor in lead roles. This film's music was composed by Dabbu Ghosal, Akassh and Imran Mahmudul.

The film centers around Major Shehzad Khan, a Secret Service Bangladesh agent, tasked with assassinating Zulfiqer Mirza, who is planning to undertake a massive terrorist attack in Bangladesh. The plot of the film builds around SSB espionage operation, and assassination of Zulfiqer Mirza in Australia. That specialized operation was led by Captain Syed Helaluddin, Major Shehzad & Lt Rawshan Mehdi. This operation was a historic success of DGFI. The movie was made on basis of that true undercover operation. It was one of Principal photography began in September 2016, in Sydney, Australia. The film was slated to release on 23 December 2017, but did not release.

== Cast ==
- Shakib Khan as Captain Shehzad Khan Rana
- Shiba Ali Khan as Raima
- Misha Sawdagor as Zulfiqer Mirza
- Tiger Robi as ex "Capt" Afgan
- Taskeen Rahman
- Sayelaluddin Mahalder, (Indian West Bengal film actor)

== Controversy ==
The production of Operation Agnipath, starring Shakib Khan, faced a prolonged delay primarily due to an ongoing dispute between its director, Ashiqur Rahman, and producer, Jane Alam. Allegations of financial mismanagement, lack of professionalism, and budget overruns led to severe friction between the director and producer, leaving the shooting incomplete and stalling the film's progress for several years.

== Soundtrack ==
Operation Agneepath

Soundtrack album by Dabbu, Akassh, Imran Mahmudul, Ali Akram Shuvo and Aryan Ashik.
- Released: 2019
- Recorded: 2018
- Studio: Vertex Production
- Genre: Feature film soundtrack

Singles from Operation Agneepath

All music is composed by Dabbu, Akassh, Imran Mahmudul, Ali Akram Shuvo, Naved Parvez and Aryan Ashik.

No.	Title	Length
1.	"Title Song"

== Legal issues ==
In March 2023, Rahmat Ullah, one of the co-producers of Operation Agneepath, submitted a complaint to Bangladeshi film associations alleging that Shakib Khan behaved unprofessionally and committed sexual assault against a female crew member during the film's Sydney schedule in 2016. According to New South Wales Police records, an event reference report had been logged regarding an incident in September 2016, and Khan was briefly questioned by local police in early 2018; however, no formal criminal charges or convictions were documented. Khan denied all allegations, describing them as an attempt at extortion, and subsequently filed a defamation lawsuit against Rahmat Ullah in Dhaka. The alleged victim also stated in media reports that she had not authorized any third party to lodge complaints on her behalf.

== Production ==
The film's production initially stalled following its preliminary shooting schedule in Australia and the release of a teaser. After a decade-long hiatus due to internal complications, the project was revived with revisions to the original script and cast to align with contemporary cinematic trends. Principal photography is scheduled to resume in 2027, with plans for a theatrical release in non-festival periods later that year.

== Release ==
The official teaser for Operation Agneepath was released in December 2016. However, principal photography was halted following its first schedule in Australia due to internal production disputes and scheduling conflicts. In August 2026, the production house Vertex Production House announced plans to resume filming for the remaining portion in late 2027, with a tentative theatrical release scheduled for December 2027.
