= Anika Kabir Shokh =

Bangladesi actress, dancer and model

- আনিকা কবির শখ
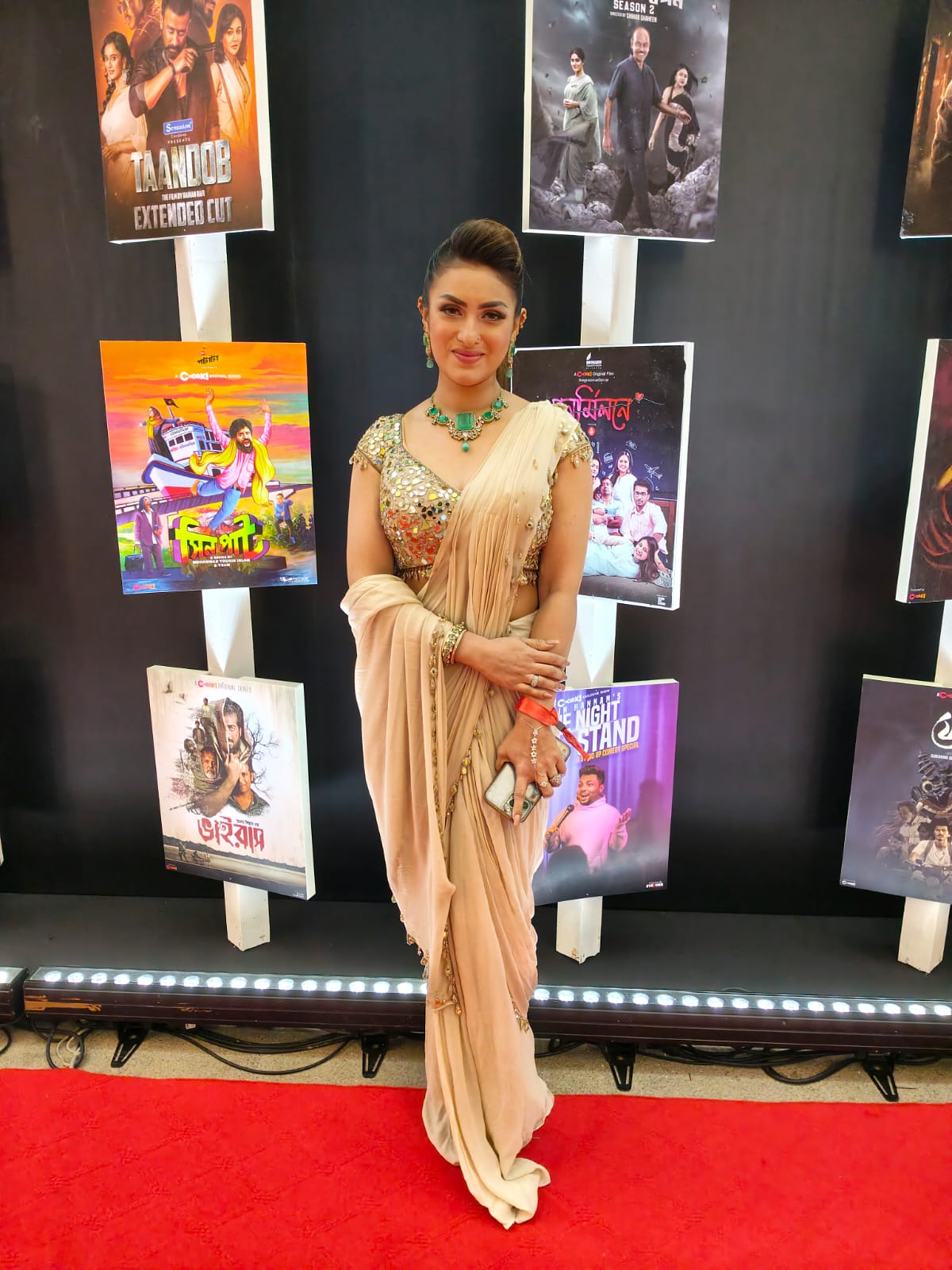
- Shokh in 2026
- Occupations: Actress, model
- Years active: 2002–present
- Spouses: Niloy Alamgir (Note: Sources disagree on the year the marriage to Alamgir began. The Daily Sun and WeeklyBD report 2016, but the Daily Bangladesh and RTV News say 2015.) (m. 2016; div. 2017); Atiqur Rahman John (m. 2020)
- Children: Anahita Rahman Alif

Anika Kabir Shokh is a Bangladeshi actress, dancer and model. Shokh started her modeling career in 2002. She started acting on TV in year 2008 by acting in Redoan Rony's TV serial FnF: Friends & Family. She made her debut in 2010 with Bolona Tumi Amar alongside Shakib Khan. She is also a brand ambassador of Banglalink.

== Media works ==
Bangladeshi model Anika Kabir Shokh became popular in the Bangladeshi media through her performance in a Banglalink Desh Television commercial. Shokh acted in several Bengali television dramas, including FNF, Fifty Fifty, Diba Ratri Khola Thake, Rong, and College directed by Pallab Bishwash.

She played leading roles in several television commercials outside Bengali drama, namely 'BD Gura Moshola', 'Uro Lemon', 'Toshin Fan', and 'Banglalink'. Her first Bengali movie was Bolona Tumi Amar. Later on, she worked in many dramas and telefilms.

== Filmography ==
Year	Film	Role	Director	Notes
2010	Bolona Tumi Amar	Anjali Khan	M B Manik	
2014	Olpo Olpo Premer Golpo	Tania Ahmed	Saniat Hossain	

== Dramas ==
Year	Drama	Director	Notes
2008	Friends n Family (FNF)	Redwan Roni & Sagor.Rsa	
2009	Reality Show	Iftekhar Ahmed	
2009	House Full	Iftekhar Ahmed Fahmi	
2009	Fifty 50	Iftekhar Ahmed Fahmi	
2010	College	Pallab Bishash	
2011	Je Tumi Khub Kacher	Choyonika Choudhury	
2011	Munshibari		
2011	Rupar Shesh Kotha	Choyonika Choudhury	
2012	Borshai Gulaber Sourov	Sahajaza Mamun	
2013	Bhul Thikanay Jatra	Mohan Khan	
2013	Ghotona Chokre		
2013	Gurumukhi Bidda	Moktadir Ibne Salam	
2013	Bhalobasar Kahini		
2014	Bihobol Dishehara	Sagar Jahan	
	Chutir Akash	Anisuzzaman	
	Chena Chena Lagey	B U Shuvo	
	Kat Golaper Sourov	Shakhawat Manik	
	Kusum Kobi	Humayun Kabir	
2017	Smart Boy Akhon Malaysia	Shamin Jaman	
2020	Mon Chor		
2020	Shutoy Badha Projapoti	Rupok Bin Rowf	Channel Itv
2020	Notun Driver	Moyukh Bary	Rtvs
