= Olpo Olpo Premer Golpo =

- Poster
- Directed by: Saniat
- Screenplay by: Saniat Hossain; Abdullah Zahir Babu
- Story by: Saniat Hossain; Abdullah Zahir Babu
- Produced by: Saniat Hossain; Esha Yousuff
- Starring: Niloy Alamgir; Anika Kabir Shokh; Misha Sawdagor
- Cinematography: Saiful Shahin; Raihan Khan
- Edited by: Shahidul Haque
- Music by: Shawkat Ali Emon; Belal Khan; Emon Saha
- Production company: Sugar Production
- Distributed by: Jaaz Multimedia
- Release date: 29 August 2014
- Running time: 128 minutes
- Country: Bangladesh
- Language: Bengali

Olpo Olpo Premer Golpo is a 2014 Bangladeshi romantic drama film directed by Saniat Hossain and produced by Saniat Hossain and Esha Yousuff under the banner of Sugar Productions. The screenplay and story were written by Saniat Hossain and Abdullah Zahir Babu. The film stars Niloy Alamgir, Anika Kabir Shokh, and Misha Sawdagor in the lead roles. Other supporting roles include Shampa Reza, Shahidul Alam Sachchu, Jayshree Kar Jaya, Kabila, Anna, Tabassum Anila Hridi, and many others.

Olpo Olpo Premer Golpo was Saniat Hossain's first film directed by him and Misha Sawdagor won the Best Comedian award at the 39th Bangladesh National Film Awards. It is a remake of the 2011 Telugu-language film Ala Modalaindi.

== Plot ==
Farid Chowdhury calls Bishu and tells him that a boy is heading towards his house to break up his daughter's marriage. He has to stop that boy. Chowdhury makes a deal with Bishu that he will kidnap that boy, Niloy. In due time, he finds Niloy. Niloy wants to escape from Bishu but cannot. So he is forced to go with Bishu. Bishu asks him to sing a song to relieve the boredom of the long journey. Bored by Niloy's singing, he asks him to tell a story. Niloy starts his story. His love story.

== Cast ==
- Niloy Alamgir as Niloy Chowdhury
- Anika Kabir Shokh as Tania Ahmed
- Misha Sawdagor as Vishu, professional kidnapper
- Shampa Reza as Selina Chowdhury, Niloy's mother
- Shahidul Alam Sachchu as Tania's father
- Jayashree Kar Jaya as Ruby, Tania's mother
- Kabila as Shamsu
- Anna
- Sushma Sarkar
- Tabassum Anila Hridi as Keya
- Raisa Islam Orpa as Tumpa
- Shamim Ahmed

== Production ==
The shooting of the film Aalab Aalab Premer Golpo began in late 2011. The shooting was completed after about a year and a half in July 2013. After the completion of dubbing and printing work, the film received clearance from the Bangladesh Film Censor Board on 25 May 2014.

== Release ==
Olpa Olpo Premer Golpo was released on 29 August 2014. The film was released in 100 theatres across the country. It was broadcast on online television Popcorn Live and Gazi TV on the second day of Eid-ul-Fitr 2015.

== Awards ==
Awards	Category	Winner	Result	Ref.
39th Bangladesh National Film Awards	Best Comedian	Misha Sawdagor	Won	
