= Niloy Alamgir =

Bangladeshi actor and model (born 1984)

- নিলয় আলমগীর
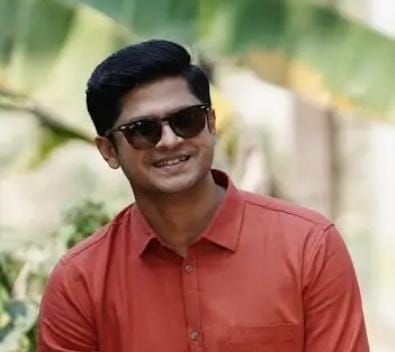
- Niloy in 2024
- Born: August 20, 1984 (age 42); Dhaka, Bangladesh
- Citizenship: Bangladeshi
- Occupations: Actor, model, producer
- Years active: 2010 – present
- Title: Mister Bangladesh 2009
- Spouses: Anika Kabir Shokh (m. 2016; div. 2017) Tasnuva Tabbasum Hridi (m. 2021)
- Children: Rooshda Maimanah
- Parent(s): Awlad Hossain (father); Asma Hossain (mother)
- Website: niloyalamgir.com

Niloy Alamgir is a Bangladeshi film actor and one of the country's most prominent and bankable actor, producer and model. Through a career spanning over two decades, Alamgir has won several accolades and acted in over 700 dramas, ranging from romance to horror genres, though usually in action genres, thus proving himself one of the most popular Bangla drama actors since the 2010s.

He is the champion in Fair & Lovely Super Hero Super Heroine contest in 2009 - organized by BFDC, Market Access Group & NTV. Alamgir initially established himself as a fashion model before making his film debut in the 2011 film Baily Road.

== Career ==
Niloy Alamgir is a Bangladeshi actor and model known for his work in the Bangladeshi entertainment industry Niloy Alamgir gained recognition after winning the "Super Hero Super Heroine" contest in 2009, organized by NTV, Bangladesh Film Development Corporation (BFDC), and Market Access Group. This victory launched his career in the entertainment industry. He made his film debut in 2011 with Baily Road directed by Masood Kayenat. His movie Olpo Olpo Premer Golpo was released 29 August 2014.

Niloy Almagir has appeared in numerous television commercials, making him a household name in Bangladesh.

== Personal life ==
Niloy Alamgir was born on 20 August 1984 in Dhaka. His father is Awlad Hossain and his mother is Asma Hossain. He married model and actress Anika Kabir Shokh on 7 January 2016 but divorced on 17 July 2017. On 30 June 2021 he married Tasnuva Tabassum Hridi. Their daughter's name Rooshda Maimanah.

== Filmography ==
Year	Film	Co-artist	Director	Notes
2011	Baily Road	Achol	Masood Kayenat	Debut film
2013	Rupgawal	Shimla	Habibur Rahman	
2014	Olpo Olpo Premer Golpo	Anika Kabir Shokh	Saniat Hossain	Remake of Telugu film Ala Modalaindi

== Television ==
=== TV films ===
- 1. Shoshur Barite Eid (2024)
- 2. Mamar Bari (2024)
- 3. Songhsar Amar Vallage Na (2023)
- 4. Chacha Vhatija Zindabad (2023)
- 5. Ektukhani Bhul (2022)
- 6. Goriber Borolok Chakor (2023)
- 7. Bipode Pore Biye (2022)
- 8. Dustu Shoshur Misty Jamai (2023)
- 9. Bandhobir Bhai (2024)
- 10. Dhakaiya Pola Sylheti Furi (2023)
- 11. Hobu Ghor Jamai (2023)
- 12. Amra Gorib (2023)
- 13. Choto Mia Boro Mia (2023)
- 14. Silent Jamai (2023)
- 15. Saudi Motin (2024)
- 16. Nana Bari Barishal (2022)
- 17. Poran Pakhi (2023)
- 18. Love You Madam (2023)
- 19. Bondhur Bou (2021)
- 20. Jamai Number One (2022)
- 21. Bhai Prem Bujhe Na (2022)
- 22. Jamai Shoshur 420 (2023)
- 23. Beshorom (2022)
- 24. Biyer Porikkha (2021)
- 25. Barir Pashe Shoshurbari (2024)
- 26. Shanti Nai (2024)
- 27. Biye Korbo Sylhet (2024)
- 28. Facebook Prem (2022)
- 29. Boroloker Gorib Jamai (2024)
- 30. Chupi Chupi (2024)
- 31. Shami Vokto Bou (2023)
- 32. Local Jamai (2023)
- 33. Prem Korechi Bish Kheyechi (2022)
- 34. Shoshurbarir Appayon (2024)
- 35. Bakir Nam Faki (2023)
- 36. Sukhe Nai Goni Mia (2024)
- 37. Rongila (2023)
- 38. Uchit Kotha (2023)
- 39. Ex Jokhon Shali (2022)
- 40. Hate You Madam (2023)
- 41. Dui Shashuri (2023)
- 42. Bongshogoto Jomidar (2024)
- 43. Bhuture Prem (2022)
- 44. Biye Barir Chor (2024)
- 45. Shoshurbari Zindabad (2023)
- 46. Telephone e Biye (2025)
- 47. Kistir Sir (2024)
- 48. Akkas Ekhon America (2023)
- 49. Churi Kore Prem (2023)
- 50. Mon Majar (2024)
- 51. Guest in Singapore (2024)
- 52. Emon Jamai Chai Na (2024)
- 53. Hothat Bou (2022)
- 54. Biye Korboi (2022)
- 55. Shoshurer Ditio Biye (2023)
- 56. Jamai Shoshurer Korbani (2023)
- 57. Yo Yo Jamai (2024)
- 58. Amra Obibahito (2024)
- 59. Breakup Kono Bapar Na (2022)
- 60. Khan Saheber Jamai (2022)
- 61. Problem e Achi Bhai (2022)
- 62. Dustu Premika (2023)
- 63. Attiyo (2024)
- 64. Cheater (2022)
- 65. Item Boy (2022)
- 66. Mezbani Valobasha (2023)
- 67. Fida (2023)
- 68. Mrs. Disturb (2023)
- 69. Bekkol Na Soja (2024)
- 70. Bou Mani Na (2024)
- 71. Love Accident (2023)
- 72. Ragi Jamai (2023)
- 73. Trendy Love (2021)
- 74. Bodyguard (2022)
- 75. Ex Jokhon Shali–2 (2022)
- 76. Dhakaiya Hero (2024)
- 77. Cute Premik (2023)
- 78. Chor Holeo Manush Bhalo (2022)
- 79. Jamai Shoshurer Lorai (2024)
- 80. Sweetyr Cousin (2024)
- 81. Porbo Na Biye Korbo (2024)
- 82. Lungi Man (2024)
- 83. Jhograte Bou (2022)
- 84. Ajob Pera (2022)
- 85. Mr Kipta (2022)
- 86. Double Dose (2023)
- 87. Gobhir Joler Fish (2022)
- 88. Tokkor (2025)
- 89. Kothakar Pani Kothay Goray (2024)
- 90. Morog Polao (2024)
- 91. Jamai Bou 420 (2023)
- 92. Ekannoborti (2025)
- 93. Love Partner (2023)
- 94. Beyainsob–3 (2022)
- 95. Readymade Jhamela (2023)
- 96. Jomidar er Nati (2022)
- 97. Girlfriend Jokhon Boss (2022)
- 98. Family Trouble (2023)
- 99. Amake Marben Na (2023)
- 100. Rokter Bondhon (2025)
- 101. Bou Chintai (2022)
- 102. Odol Bodol (2024)
- 103. Shopner Basor (2024)
- 104. Aj Amar Biye (2022)
- 105. Meyeti Kotha Bolibe Prem Koribe Na (2013)
- 106. Facebook Bou (2023)
- 107. Pakhir Moton Mon (2024)
- 108. Double Duty (2024)
- 109. Sera Jamai (2024)
- 110. Gorur Dakter (2024)
- 111. Osthir Dompoti (2022)
- 112. Khandani Baburchi (2022)
- 113. Dawat (2022)
- 114. Mrs. Disturb Returns (2024)
- 115. Jamai Ador (2022)
- 116. Ami Single (2022)
- 117. Joto Gur Toto Mishti (2025)
- 118. Baire Fitfat Vitore Sodorghat (2023)
- 119. Gadha (2024)
- 120. Biyer Mishti (2023)
- 121. Chicken Lover (2023)
- 122. Baten er Beton Kom (2023)
- 123. Hothat Borolok (2024)
- 124. Mr Nurse (2023)
- 125. Shobjanta Shamsunnahar (2024)
- 126. Tumi To Amari (2023)
- 127. Funnymoon (2023)
- 128. Champion Chor (2023)
- 129. Ragi Meye vs Boka Chele
- 130. Chimti (2022)
- 131. Bou Rekhe Paliye (2024)
- 132. Premik Leader (2023)
- 133. Kunjus Couple (2025)
- 134. Kan Somachar (2022)
- 135. Biyer Mohorana (2022)
- 136. Dakat Shoshur (2023)
- 137. Chowdhury & Sons (2023)
- 138. Preme Pore Pagol (2022)
- 139. Pain Guest (2023)
- 140. Valobashar Chuijhal (2024)
- 141. Shakat Tailors (2022)
- 142. Adore Theko (2024)
- 143. Chor Premik (2022)
- 144. Morte Morte Beche Gelam (2024)
- 145. Habib Decorator (2024)
- 146. Churi Korecho Amar Monta (2023)
- 147. BMW Er Driver (2024)
- 148. Biyer Dawat (2023)
- 149. Good Friend Good Lover (2023)
- 150. Private Jamai (2022)
- 151. Koti Takar Deposit (2023)
- 152. 200 Takar Prem (2022)
- 153. Beshi Beshi (2024)
- 154. Buyar Biral (2025)
- 155. Ore Baba Girlfriend (2022)
- 156. Sukhi Manush (2024)
- 157. Premer Biye Mani Na (2024)
- 158. Beyainsab–2 (2021)
- 159. Network Problem (2024)
- 160. Kobul Bolilo Ke? (2022)
- 161. Ekti Biye Sharajiboner Kanna (2021)
- 162. Bouyer Buddhi (2022)
- 163. Kanar Hatbazar (2022)
- 164. Bahaduri (2024)
- 165. Valobasar Shesh Ongko (2022)
- 166. Hariye Jaua Bornomala (2021)
- 167. Biyer Shortho (2022)
- 168. Cheletar Mukh Kharap (2022)
- 169. Apoder Bipod (2025)
- 170. Tomar Sathe Aari (2024)
- 171. Prothom Prem (2024)
- 172. Bondhu Jokhon Shotru (2023)
- 173. Thot Kata Jamai (2023)
- 174. Biyer Tablet (2022)
- 175. PS Jamai (2022)
- 176. Ghotoker Biye (2024)
- 177. Shesh Preme Shuru (2023)
- 178. Juboraj (2018)
- 179. Biye Niye Paglami (2022)
- 180. Sheetal (2024)
- 181. African Guest (2023)
- 182. Offline Valobasha (2025)
- 183. Nana Bari Barishal–2 (2023)
- 184. Detective Chor (2023)
- 185. Premer Tane Premika Deshe (2022)
- 186. Bahadur Jamai (2024)
- 187. Ei Ghor Ei Songsar (2024)
- 188. Mister Mistri (2023)
- 189. Political Love (2023)
- 190. Premer Bazar Bhalo Na (2022)
- 191. Too Late (2024)
- 192. Bhorpur Singapore (2024)
- 193. Konnashumari (2023)
- 194. Pagol Prem (2023)
- 195. Ami Bachte Chai Na (2022)
- 196. Ronger Jibon (2019)
- 197. Japani Bou (2022)
- 198. Double Pain (2022)
- 199. Tom & Jerryr Biye (2025)
- 200. Home Politics (2024)
- 201. Ek Jonome Valobese (2024)
- 202. Biye Ami Korbo Na (2022)
- 203. 200 Koti Matro (2024)
- 204. Chorer Bou Chunni (2022)
- 205. Gache Kathal Gonfe Tel (2022)
- 206. Dui Number Jamai (2023)
- 207. Tera Bou (2024)
- 208. Pagol Hoye Jabo (2022)
- 209. Ek Paye Juta (2024)
- 210. Son of Don (2024)
- 211. Breakfail Nabab (2024)
- 212. Ojhothai (2024)
- 213. Abar Fire Ele (2024)
- 214. Ek Poloke (2023)
- 215. Chander Deshe Prem (2024)
- 216. Cheating Master (2024)
- 217. Hayre Prem (2024)
- 218. Powerful Dompioti (2022)
- 219. Lokkhi Jamai (2023)
- 220. Facebook Bibaho (2018)
- 221. Oti Chalak (2025)
- 222. Jhamela Alltime (2022)
- 223. Chape Pore Biye (2023)
- 224. Jamai Atonko (2023)
- 225. Lokkhi Tera (2023)
- 226. Second Marriage (2022)
- 227. Girlfriend Cup Tournament (2023)
- 228. Wada (2023)
- 229. Dourer Upor (2021)
- 230. Follow Her (2021)
- 231. Happiness (2023)
- 232. Bari Barishal (2024)
- 233. Mastan Number One (2022)
- 234. Onno Kothau (2017)
- 235. Jar Jonno Kori Churi (2023)
- 236. Golar Kata (2023)
- 237. Amta Amta Prem (2024)
- 238. Cheleti Preme Porechhilo (2021)
- 239. Made in Barishal (2023)
- 240. Basay Manbe Na (2023)
- 241. Durghotona Kobolito Boyfriend (2022)
- 242. Mr. Chalak (2024)
- 243. Mr. Confused (2024)
- 244. Home Delivery (2021)
- 245. Cat Lover (2023)
- 246. Toilet Cleaner (2024)
- 247. Goriber Crush (2023)
- 248. Nagin Girlfriend (2023)
- 249. Buker Vitor Nupur Baje (2023)
- 250. Aha Mojid (2024)
- 251. Extra Care (2023)
- 252. Na Dile Pai Koi (2022)
- 253. Teacher Jokhon Crush (2023)
- 254. Shami Bhokto Bou–2 (2023)
- 255. Jemon Jamai Temon Bou (2021)
- 256. Mr Buddhiman (2024)
- 257. Jotishi Bou (2024)
- 258. Moner Ghor (2021)
- 259. Biye Ekta Magic (2023)
- 260. Love Accident–2 (2024)
- 261. Jamai Bondi (2021)
- 262. Ichchhe Thakle Biye Hoy (2023)
- 263. Kismot (2023)
- 264. Bou Pagol Jamai (2024)
- 265. Jamoj Bhai (2021)
- 266. Photo Mannan (2021)
- 267. Double Offer (2023)
- 268. Bhul Korechi Prem Korechi (2023)
- 269. Summer Vacation (2025)
- 270. Pagoler Sukh Mone Mone (2025)
- 271. Valobashar Ful (2021)
- 272. Tomake Chai (2021)
- 273. Sorkari Jamai (2024)
- 274. Dustu Meyer Misty Baba (2024)
- 275. Munsi Bari (2020)
- 276. Ek Ticket e Dui Chobi (2021)
- 277. Ekshathe (2022)
- 278. Ural Prem (2023)
- 279. Eye Wash (2023)
- 280. Rupali Alor Khoje (2017)
- 281. Mon Khela (2017)
- 282. Se Ebong Tumi O Ami (2019)
- 283. Rod Asbe Bole (2014)
- 284. Ratry Diprohor (2018)
- 285. Dui Pithibi (2021)
- 286. Onuvutir Chua Tumi (2023)
- 287. Neel Kabbo (2024)
- 288. It’s A Fact (2024)
- 289. Mohila Probesh Nishedh (2021)
- 290. Harano Biggopti (2023)
- 291. Dhrubotara (2023)
- 292. Love Connection (2024)
- 293. Mrs. Disturb Again (2025)
- 294. Amar Nayika (2023)
- 295. Munnar Girlfriend (2021)
- 296. Private Biye (2024)
- 297. Bodnam (2024)
- 298. Laltu Dalal (2022)
- 299. Kolkatar Jamai (2023)
- 300. Basor Ghor Tumi Kar (2023)
- 301. Bachelor Crisis (2021)
- 302. Cholo Palai (2022)
- 303. Tomar Nam Ki? (2021)
- 304. Nirapod Durotto Bojay Rakhun (2021)
- 305. Babar Pochondo (2022)
- 306. Love Detergent (2023)
- 307. House Husband (2024)
- 308. Freelance Dhandabaj (2023)
- 309. How Cow (2024)
- 310. Minar O Mitur Songsar (2021)
- 311. Bouyer Mon Police Police (2024)
- 312. Valobashi Tomake (2023)
- 313. Amar Ekjon Manush Ache (2024)
- 314. Life Settle (2022)
- 315. Prem Hoite Sabdhan (2023)
- 316. Kechal Jamai (2021)
- 317. Gunda Family (2023)
- 318. Just Married (2024)
- 319. Shala Vs Dulabhai (2021)
- 320. Morichika (2022)
- 321. Mubarak (2022)
- 322. Boal Macher Matha (2020)
- 323. Housemate (2024)
- 324. Ex Jokhon Bhabi (2021)
- 325. Khal Kete Kumir (2025)
- 326. Point To Be Noted (2023)
- 327. Anonto Prem (2023)
- 328. Unlucky Boyfriend (2021)
- 329. Kom Khoroce Biye (2023)
- 330. Manush Dekhte Kemon? (2024)
- 331. Bariwala Girlfriend (2022)
- 332. Tori (2023)
- 333. Boal Macher Matha–2 (2022)
- 334. Cherager Doitto (2021)
- 335. Ami Kar Ke Amar (2024)
- 336. Alpona (2024)
- 337. Pap (2023)
- 338. Putuler Ghor (2024)
- 339. Porir Nam Moyna Pakhi (2019)
- 340. Ek Dojon Girlfriend (2023)
- 341. Faporbaj (2022)
- 342. Kaktal (2024)
- 343. Tumake Vebe (2023)
- 344. Prem Chukti (2024)
- 345. Prem Kolongker Mala (2022)
- 346. Jor Kore Biye (2022)
- 347. Prem Kamor (2022)
- 348. Dim Therapy (2021)
- 349. Nervous Couple (2025)
- 350. Nosib (2025)
- 351. Jamai Bipode (2021)
- 352. Nam Dhore Dakte Chai (2023)
- 353. Van Plaza (2023)
- 354. Faltu Chele (2021)
- 355. Fokir Jokhon Kotipoti (2025)
- 356. Tafaling (2022)
- 357. Nirjon Upokule
- 358. Priyo Shoshur Abba (2024)
- 359. Tumi Jekhane Ami Sekhane (2022)
- 360. Cap (2022)
- 361. Green Signal (2023)
- 362. Painful Girlfriend (2022)
- 363. Laily Mojnur Biye (2025)
- 364. Shoshurer Biye (2022)
- 365. Success Party (2024)
- 366. Mem Saheb (2023)
- 367. Khancha (2023)
- 368. Side Character (2022)
- 369. Nona Jole Prem (2023)
- 370. Biyer Bazar Bhalo Na (2025)
- 371. Saheb Bibi Joker (2023)
- 372. Classmate (2022)
- 373. Made in China (2023)
- 374. Nayika Tumi Kar? (2023)
- 375. Girlfriender Baap (2022)
- 376. Ekti Rat (2019)
- 377. Sat Din Age Pore (2025)
- 378. Premer Khobor (2024)
- 379. Mission to America (2021)
- 380. Pagol Premik (2023)
- 381. Okorma (2025)
- 382. Pirit er Budget Kom (2023)
- 383. Khela Jomeche (2020)
- 384. Lutera (2024)
- 385. Ossikar (2024)
- 386. Life Partner (2018)
- 387. Tonatuni Marriage Media (2023)
- 388. Rajar Rani (2022)
- 389. Mithyuk Mihir Ali (2024)
- 390. Projapoti Rong Fagune (2018)
- 391. Jonmo (2023)
- 392. Ludu Star Couple (2025)
- 393. Jamai Bou 69 (2017)
- 394. Goriber Bondhu (2025)
- 395. Paharadar (2025)
- 396. Chairman er Pola (2017)
- 397. Poristhiti Niyontroner Baire (2022)
- 398. Gramer Chele (2022)
- 399. Jhagrapurer Piriti (2023)
- 400. Sumi Tumi Kothay? (2022)
- 401. Daku (2025)
- 402. Babar Ponkhiraj (2022)
- 403. Nijer Dhol (2024)
- 404. Wedding Photography (2022)
- 405. Shesh Biday Store (2024)
- 406. Ghor Palano Meye (2019)
- 407. Bossgiri (2024)
- 408. Rocky The Bad Boy (2022)
- 409. Premik Jokhon Baburchi (2023)
- 410. Mission Blackmail (2021)
- 411. Shuvo Bibaho (2023)
- 412. Hawlad Monir (2022)
- 413. Amra Dui Bhai Dui Bon (2019)
- 414. Dussomproker Girlfriend (2022)

415. Mofiz Sir (2021)

- 416. Girlfriend Sudhu Gift Chay (2021)
- 417. Amar Babar Nam Ki? (2022)
- 418. Obosheshe Valobese (2023)
- 419. Tomake Valobese (2022)
- 420. Sundori Patri Chai (2020)
- 421. Bhulebhale Bhalobasha (2025)
- 422. Love You Baba (2023)
- 423. Tritiyojon (2019)
- 424. Polayon Biddya (2021)
- 425. Double Role (2025)
- 426. Megh Brishti Ek Tukro Surjo (2021)
- 427. Bajao Biyer Bajna (2024)
- 428. Psycho Lover (2021)
- 429. Bodyguard Torab Ali (2021)
- 430. Bou Boshikoron Montro (2021)
- 431. Love in Station (2024)
- 432. Kothay Na Kaje Bishwasi (2025)
- 433. November Rain (2025)
- 434. Jamai Vs Shashuri (2021)
- 435. Golmal (2022)
- 436. Bachi Tomar Khayale (2022)
- 437. Bou Jokhon Jhagrote (2021)
- 438. Sukher Suitcase (2025)
- 439. Breakup Theke Shuru (2025)
- 440. Show-Off (2025)
- 441. Neel Rong-er Cycle (2025)
- 442. Bou Khujhe Berai (2021)
- 443. Kom Khoroce Honeymoon (2025)
- 444. Same To Same (2023)
- 445. Viral Boy (2023)
- 446. Ami Kar Chele? (2022)
- 447. Jonom Jonom (2023)
- 448. Shopner Bidesh (2024)
- 449. Bou Amar (2025)
- 450. Ghore Songsar Bahire Prem (2025)
- 451. Neta (2022)
- 452. Praner Manush (2025)
- 453. Polatok Premik (2023)
- 454. Love Medicine (2023)
- 455. Golpota Purono (2023)
- 456. Dhonir Dulal (2022)
- 457. Musafir Khana (2025)
- 458. Mayajal (2018)
- 459. Maleker Shopno (2024)
- 460. Na Rakha Kotha (2023)
- 461. Crack Girl (2024)
- 462. Chander Gaye Chand (2023)
- 463. Mone Mone (2018)
- 464. Silent Propose (2020)
- 465. Middle Class Prem (2022)
- 466. Mouse Trap (2023)
- 467. Bhalobashar Shomikoron (2017)
- 468. Tapmatra 52 Degree Celsius (2023)
- 469. Charbona Tomake (2018)
- 470. Majhir Prem (2023)
- 471. Purno Hridoy (2019)
- 472. Joshnamoyi (2016)
- 473. Kalo Manik (2019)
- 474. Bou Porikkha (2023)
- 475. Mishti JontroNa (2020)
- 476. Tomar Hridoy Pagol (2017)
- 477. Prem Mane Problem (2025)
- 478. Protighat (2018)
- 479. Ektu Chhoa Lage (2022)
- 480. Balam-er Bam Pa (2022)
- 481. Dorodiya (2024)
- 482. Aram Babu (2021)
- 483. Ekla Pakhi (2018)
- 484. Drishti (2022)
- 485. Premika Khujhe Berai (2022)
- 486. Bhaja Mach Ulte Khao (2018)
- 487. Neelimar Akashe Megh (2017)
- 488. Divorce Agency (2022)
- 489. Bideshi Koinna (2021)
- 490. Sobuj Bangla Band Party (2023)
- 491. Bhul Kore Mistake (2025)
- 492. Run (2018)
- 493. TikTok Brothers (2021)
- 494. False Alarm (2022)
- 495. Onubhob (2021)
- 496. Paglamir Ekta Limit Ache (2018)
- 497. Saritei Nari (2021)
- 498. Sweet Tears (2023)
- 499. Gunda Premik (2022)
- 500. Matching Brothers-2 (2018)
- 501. Kokila (2016)
- 502. CheleTa Pagol Pagol (2025)
- 503. Bindu Na Rekha (2017)
- 504. Roton Mukta (2022)
- 505. Nichok Prem (2018)
- 506. Abar Jodi Dekha Hoy (2019)
- 507. One Fine Day (2020)
- 508. Neel Noksha (2022)
- 509. Eksathe Tumi Ami (2022)
- 510. Bhul Premer Golpo (2024)
- 511. Fera Holo Na (2021)
- 512. Neel Kosto (2021)
- 513. Amar Hatta Ektu Dhoro (2019)
- 514. Taqdir (2023)
- 515. Sanai (2018)
- 516. Mayajal-2 (2023)
- 517. Bhalobashi Tomay (2023)
- 518. Lal Pipra Kalo Pipra (2017)
- 519. Between The Gap (2019)
- 520. Delivery Girl (2024)
- 521. Sentimental Love (2021)
- 522. Funnymoon-2 (2025)
- 523. Daba (2024)
- 524. Ahare Jibon (2019)
- 525. Premer Golpe Pichutan (2022)
- 526. Tour (2020)
- 527. Protidwondi (2021)
- 528. Golir Master Mia Bhai (2018)
- 529. Mojnu Juliet (2022)
- 530. Ekla Akash (2018)
- 531. Bhalobashar Shada Golap (2020)
- 532. Gadha Putro (2021)
- 533. Evabe Chole Jeyona (2015)
- 534. Meet My Girlfriend (2024)
- 535. The Train (2017)
- 536. Bhalobashar Neel Kham (2020)
- 537. Prem Ekti Golpo (2021)
- 538. Belasheshe (2020)
- 539. Helmet (2024)
- 540. Buker Khachai Agun (2023)
- 541. Obosheshe Ekdin (2022)
- 542. Dekha Hoy Nai (2021)
- 543. Love Mane Loss (2021)
- 544. Selfie Bou (2020)
- 545. Tomake Ar Pai Na (2019)
- 546. Game (2023)
- 547. Dorphoron (2020)
- 548. Ei Boishakhe (2017)
- 549. Thikana (2021)
- 550. Silent Thief (2023)
- 551. Dhakay Taka Ure (2017)
- 552. China Red Killer (2018)
- 553. Jora Sako (2018)
- 554. Bhalobashar Ek Goj (2022)
- 555. Chera Dip (2016)
- 556. Gaye Holuder Rat (2024)
- 557. Nishswartho Bhalobasha (2023)
- 558. Sonali Bikel (2018)
- 559. Priyo Tumi (2019)
- 560. Jabbajjibon (2018)
- 561. Inner Essence (2018)
- 562. Bipoder Moha Somabesh (2020)
- 563. Kalo Pori (2023)
- 564. Lover Boy (2019)
- 565. Harjit (2022)
- 566. Boss Is Always Right (2022)
- 567. Biporite Hit (2017)
- 568. Turn Over (2023)
- 569. Colony Cup (2018)
- 570. Pen Friend (2017)
- 571. Upohar (2019)
- 572. Bhalobasha Chokher Jol (2021)
- 573. Tobuo Tomake Bhalobashi (2022)
- 574. Tumi Amay Kototuku Bhalobasho (2022)
- 575. Protarok Premik (2022)
- 576. Dotana Prem (2022)
- 577. Blackmail (2021)
- 578. Bad Idea (2019)
- 579. Paruler Golpo (2018)
- 580. Somrat Shahjahan (2017)
- 581. Shubho Prapti (2022)
- 582. Ekti Misti Premer Golpo (2018)
- 583. Life Is Beautiful (2018)
- 584. Ichche Ghurir Natai (2019)
- 585. Akash Gonga (2022)
- 586. Bhul (2023)
- 587. Nonajol (2022)
- 588. Bideshi Rajkonna (2019)
- 589. Takar Khela (2021)
- 590. Noyon Tara (2017)
- 591. Hasna Hena (2022)
- 592. Vacancy (2024)
- 593. Dokkhin Somudro Tire (2018)
- 594. Bidhobar Prem (2021)
- 595. No Risk No Gain (2017)
- 596. Abohoman (2017)
- 597. Sedin Bikel Chhilo (2017)
- 598. Golpo Sheshe Amra Sobai (2020)
- 599. Behind The Love (2018)
- 600. Ontor Tomo He (2019)
- 601. Rupkothar Prithibi (2023)
- 602. Ami Tumi Ebong Shei Rat (2018)
- 603. Kholos Bondi (2017)
- 604. Ferari Boshonto (2021)
- 605. Opokormo-Somoyer Golpo (2019)
- 606. Tumul Offer (2018)
- 607. Ombossar Josna (2017)
- 608. Alo Andhari (2021)
- 609. Liquid Love (2017)
- 610. Obosheshe Ekdin (2021)
- 611. Ograhayon (2018)
- 612. Hridoy Gohine (2022)
- 613. Mukhosh-Somoyer Golpo (2020)
- 614. The Great Loser (2020)
- 615. Relation (2020)
- 616. White Sugar (2022)
- 617. Upolobdhi (2019)
- 618. Modhyorater Toskor (2022)
- 619. Kichu Vul’er Kichu Kosto (2020)
- 620. Pencile Aka Bhalobasha (2016)
- 621. Tokhon Ei Somoye (2017)
- 622. Ek Jora Kalo Juta (2019)
- 623. Dui Porithibi (2021)
- 624. Juarir Prem (2020)
- 625. Samir (2025)
- 626. NiharKoli (2025)
- 627. Shamir Mon (2025)
- 628. Bhai Bhai Dondo (2025)
- 629. Cholo Hat Dhori (2025)
- 630. Protishodh (2025)
- 631. Jhumka (2025)
- 632. Dhokabaj (2025)
- 633. Bou Dekha Dao (2025)
- 634. Amra Shukhi (2025)
- 635. Sylhetir Preme Dhakaiya (2025)
- 636. Biye Korechi Bhul Korechi (2025)
- 637. Kotipoti (2025)
- 638. Koti Takar Chairman (2025)
- 639. Tomar Jonno Bhalobasha (2025)
- 640. Lojja Diben Na (2025)
- 641. Shopno Churi (2025)
- 642. Tak Kono Shomossa Na (2025)
- 643. Apon Por (2025)
- 644. Horbola (2025)
- 645. Premik Krishok (2025)
- 646. Macher Manush (2025)
- 647. Joler Prem (2025)
- 648. Bakir Khata (2025)
- 649. Thik Bethik (2025)
- 650. Guest In Thailand (2025)
- 651. Good Boy Bad Luck (2025)
- 652. Pinjor (2025)
- 653. Tin Din Baki (2025)
- 654. Purnotay Tumi (2025)
- 655. Chirkal Tumi Amar (2025)
- 656. Khati Premik (2025)
- 657. Probash e Porobase (2025)
- 658. Memory Loss (2025)
- 659. Na Bola Kothin (2025)
- 660. Amar Bhanga Garite (2025)
- 661. DJ Baharul (2025)
- 662. Purnota (2025)
- 663. Dhoka (2025)
- 664. Bhai Bhabi (2025)
- 665. The Salesman (2025)
- 666. Sobar Upore Vaat (2025)
- 667. Tumi Grammar Ami Bekoron (2025)
- 668. Maya (2025)
- 669. Mr. Fool (2025)
- 670. Ghor Chara (2025)
- 671. Chorer Ghore Churi (2025)
- 672. Kather Ful (2025)
- 673. Hit Man (2025)
- 674. Sweet Premik (2025)
- 675. Ulta Palta (2025)
- 676. Por Kokhono Apon Hoy Na (2025)
- 677. Pita Putrer Boyosh (2025)
- 678. Ek Tukro Shopno (2025)
- 679. Mayar Pakhi (2025)
- 680. Atopor Shikhito Bou (2019)
- 681. Kanamachi (2018)
- 682. Vejal Poribar (2020)
- 683. Boka Baksyo (2020)
- 684. ChottoMetro (2021)
- 685. Latim (2019)
- 686. Apon Shohor (2019)
- 687. Danguli (2020)
- 688. Ami Tomar Jonno Pagol (2022)
- 689. Rupantor (2018)
- 690. Nepal Calling (2020)
- 691. Mukul Master (2017)
- 692. Prem Kora Nishedh (2020)
- 693. Honeymoon Hobe Cox’s Bazar-e (2019)
- 694. Chirokumar Mone Mone (2018)
- 695. To Be Or Not To Be (2019)
- 696. Kotha Hobe Hisab Kore (2020)
- 697. Patching Matching (2021)
- 698. Shob Biye Bondho (2021)
- 699. Shikhito Bou (2018)
- 700.. Sonar Pakhi Rupar Pakhi (2016)
- 701. Priyo Din Priyo Raat (2018)
- 702. Bajimat (2021)
- 703. Tolpar (2020)
- 704. Khorkuta (2016)
- 705. Palonk (2019)
- 706. Biye Korte Giye (2023)
- 707. Ajob Premer Hatbazar (2018)
- 708. Shat Ghor Ek Uthan (2021)
- 709. Khelaghor (2020)
- 710. Prothom Prem (2018)
- 711. Moyna Tia (2017)
- 712. Smritir Alpona Anki (2020)
- 713. Bhalobashar Kahini (2013)
- 714. Sublet (2019)
- 715. Gyaniganjer Ponditera (2020)

SL	Drama	Director	Co-Artist	Notes
1	Rupar Shesh Kotha	Chayanika Chowdhury	Anika kabir shakh	
2	Ek Jora Kalo Juta	Arid Ahnaf	Aparna ghosh	
3	Munsi Bari	Sadek Siddiki	Anika kabir shakh	
4	Dhakai Taka Urey	Foyez Ahmed	Eshita	
5	Jochonamoyi	Redoan Rony	Nusrat imrose tisha	
6	Dui Prithibi	Mamun Khan	Mimo	
7	Onuvutir Choya Tumi	Din Mohammad Montu	rumana, ohona	
8	Rod Ashbe Bolay	Ashraf Dipu	Jenny	
9	Generation Pulse	Redoan Rony	Mehazabein chowdhury	
10	Rupali Alor Khuje	Ashutosh Sujan	Bhabna	
11	Samrat Sahjahan	Ashutosh Sujan	Anika kabir shakh	
12	Protiddhoni	Pranesh Chowdhury	Mimo	
13	Laal Pipra Kalo Pipra	Salauddin Lavlu	Labonno liza	
14	Meyeti Kotha Bolibe Prem Koribe Na	Salauddin Lavlu	Momo	
15	Dorpohoron	Shuvroh Ahmed	Mim	
16	Somorpon	Emon Talukdar	Jenny	
17	Monpura	Sheikh Runa	Mimo	
18	Opo	Sohel Arman	anika kabir shakh	
19	Gadha Putro	Sohel Arman	anika kabir shakh	
20	Shuvo Prapti	Kaushik Sankar Das	Rafiath rashid Mithila	
21	Tomar Hridoy Pagol	Ferdous Hasan	Mimo, Apurbo, Jeni	Tagore song
22	Alo Adhare		Mimo	
23	Achor	Emon Talukdar	Mim	
24	Game		Priti	
25	One Fine Day	Kowshik Sankar	Shokh	
26	Bondhu Tumi Bondhu Amar		Shokh	
27	Thikana	Shahin Sarkar	Shokh	
28	Obosheshe Ekdin	Debashish Barua Dip	Shokh	
29	Ekla Akash		Suzana, Elvin	
31	Shoshur Barite Eid	Mohin Khan	Heme	
32	Songsar Amar Vallagena	Mohin Khan	Heme	
33	Mamar Bari	Mohin Khan	Heme	
34	Ektukhani Vul	Halim Mojumder	Heme	
35	Bipode Pore Biye	Nazmul Roni	Heme	
36	Dustu Shoshur Mishty Jamai	Mohin Khan	Heme	
37	Dhakaiya Pola Sylheti Furi	Osman Miraz	Heme	
38	Amra Gorib	Mohin Khan	Heme	
39	Goriber Borolok Chakor	Mohin Khan	Samira Khan Mahi	
40	Nana Bari Barishal	Nazmul Roni	Heme	
41	Boro Mia Choto Mia	Mohin Khan	Heme	
42	Bondhur Bou	Juel Hasan	Heme	
43	Love You Madam	Mohin Khan	Heme	
44	Jamai Number 1	Nazmul Roni	Heme	
45	Silent Jamai	Julfikar Islam Shishir	Heme	
46	Biyer Porikkha	Aador Shohag	Heme	
47	Beshorom	Ziauddin Alam Islam	Heme	
48	Facebook Prem	Meetul Khan	Heme	
49	X Jokhon Shali	Mohin Khan	Heme	
50	Shami Vokto Bou	Preety Dutta	Heme	
51	Akkas Ekhon America	Osman Miraz	Samira Khan Mahi	
52	Uchit Kotha	Imraul Rafat	Heme	
53	Rongila	Zubair Ibn Bakar	Heme	
54	Poran Pakhi	Mahin Awlad	Heme	
55	Hothat Bou	Juel Hasan	Chamak	
56	Jamai Shoshur 420	Mohin Khan	Mitil	
57	Dui Shashuri	Mohin Khan	Heme	
58	Local Jamai	Haasib Hossain Rakhi	Tania Brishty	
59	Churi Kore Prem	Musafir Rony	Heme	
60	Jamai Shoshur Er Qurbani	Mohin Khan	Heme	
61	Hate You Madam	Mohin Khan	Heme	
62	Mon Majar	Mehedi Hasan Hridoy	Heme	
63	Prem Korechi Besh Kheyechi	Mohin Khan	Heme	
64	Problem ey Achi Bhai	R Mozumder	Heme	
65	Break Up Kono Bepar Na	Musafir Rony	Heme	
66	Item Boy	Mehedi Hasan Hridoy	Heme	
67	Boroloker Gorib Jamai	Mohin Khan	Heme	
68	Guest in Singapore	Hasib Hossain Rakhi	Heme	
69	Dustu Premika	Meetul Khan	Heme	
70	Bodyguard	Anisur Rahman Razib	Tania Brishty	
71	Love Accident	Hamed Hasan Noman	Heme	
72	Mrs Disturb	Hasib Hossain Rakhi	Heme	
73	Shoshurbari Zindabad	Hasib Hossain Rakhi	Heme	
74	Ajob Pera	Raisul Islam Anik	Heme	
75	TRENDY LOVE	Sajib Khan	Heme	
76	Cheater	Bishawjit Dutta	Heme	
77	Mr Kipta	Mishuk Mithu	Tania Brishty	
78	X Jokhon Shali 2	Mohin Khan	Heme	
79	Jhograte Bou	Maidul Rakib	Heme	
80	Ragi Jamai	Maidul Rakib	Tania Brishty	
81	Cute Premik	Meetul Khan	Heme	
82	Fidaa	Mohon Ahmed	Heme	
83	Chor Holeo Manush Valo	Somrat Jahangir	Heme	
84	Girlfriend Jokhon Boss	Osman Miraz	Sanjana Sarkar Riya	
85	Beainshab 3	Juel Hasan	Heme	
86	Dhakaiya Hero	Mohon Ahmed	Sarika Sabah	
87	Shoshur Barir Appayon	Golam Sohrab Dodul	Heme	
88	Shukhe Nai Goni Miya	Meetul Khan	Heme	
89	Facebook Bou	Somrat Jahangir	Heme	
90	Jamai Bou 420	Mohin Khan	Mithil	
91	Gobhir Joler Fish	Anisur Rahman Razib	Heme	
92	Bou Chintai	Mohin Khan	Heme	
93	Jomidarer Nati	Mohin Khan	Heme	
94	Ami Single	Mursalin Shuvo	Heme	
95	Readymade Jhamela	Musafir Rony	Heme	
96	Jamai Ador	Hasib Hossain Rakhi	Sarika Sabah	
97	Chimti	Imraul Rafat	Samira Khan	
98	Kan Somachar	Meetul Khan	Tania Brishty	
99	Osthir Dompoti	Musafir Rony	Heme	
100	Tokkor	Mohin Khan	Heme, Rashed Shemanto, Maimuna Ferdous Momo	
101	Biye Barir Chor	Shohel Hasan	Heme	
101	Gunda	Zubair ibna Bakar	Aisha Khan, Shahnewaz Ripon	

=== TV series ===
SL#	Drama Serial	Director
1	Bondhu Amar	Ferdous Hasan
2	Bhalobashar Kahini	Saunak Mitra
3	Paa Rekhesi Jouboney	Ferdous Hasan
4	College	Pallab Bisshas
5	Nil Rong Er Golpo	Kaushik Sankar Das
6	Sonar Pakhi Rupar Pakhi	Salauddin Lavlu
7	Priyo Din Priyo Raat	Salauddin Lavlu
8	Khorkuta	Salauddin Lavlu
9	Khelaghor	Habib Masud
10	Smiritir Alpona Anki	Murad Parvez

=== Awards ===
1	Super Hero BFDC Content	Niloy Alamgir
2	RTV Star Awards	Niloy Alamgir
