= Durbeen =

Bangladeshi film

Durbin (দূরবীন)
- Theatrical release poster
- Directed by: Zafor Firoze
- Written by: Zafor Firoze
- Produced by: Onupom
- Starring: Tamim; Rubina; Akhtarujjamn; Faruk Khan
- Cinematography: Hira Azad
- Edited by: Shamsul Alam
- Music by: Aktarul Haq, Parvez Juel
- Distributed by: Bangladesh Digital Film Society
- Release date: 29 October 2009
- Running time: 94 minutes
- Country: Bangladesh
- Language: Bengali

Durbeen (Bengali: দূরবীন; The Prevision) is a 2009 Bangladeshi film directed by Zafor Firoze. It is the first digital children film released in Bangladesh.

== Plot ==
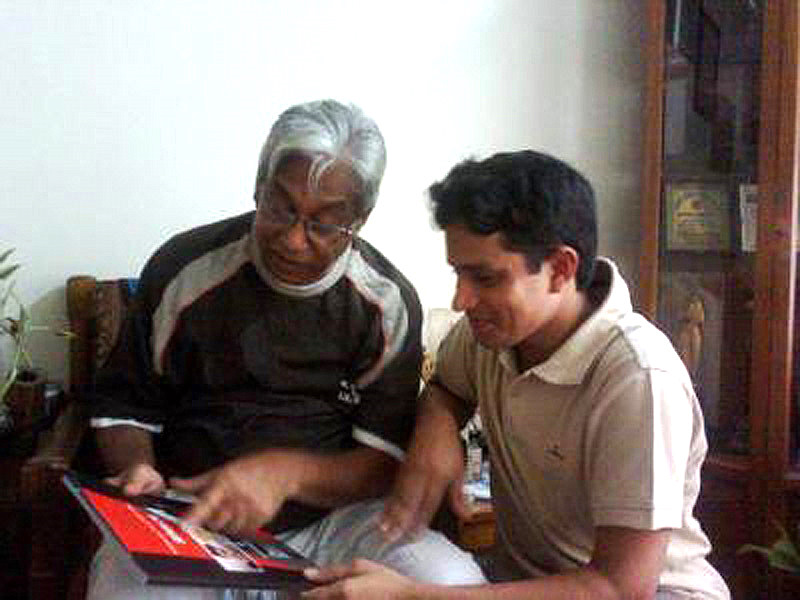
Director Zafor Firoze with Chashi Nazrul Islam

Labib a school boy is a believer in equality. He loves all living beings. Labib's mother died years ago but he has school friends. Although he is a good student, he couldn't concentrate on studies because of his missing mother. One day, he gets a new class teacher in school. The teacher inspires him to learn through an interesting teaching process and they become good friends. Labib's father makes a sudden decision to send him abroad for better education, but Labib cannot accept it as this would imply leaving his friends and his new teacher. Labib becomes physically and mentally sick. After some days his father changes his mind, allowing Labib to stay.

== Release ==
Poster of Durbeen

The film was released on 29 October 2009. Many notable persons attended the premier show at Star Cineplex. Barrister Shafique Ahmed, Minister for Law, Justice and Parliament; Abul Kalam Azad, Minister for Information and Culture; Sharmin Chowdhury, State Minister for Women and Children; Artist Mustafa Manwar, Chairman of Bangladesh Shishu Academy; Mohammad Asafuddoula, Chairman of the Advisory Committee of Bangladesh Digital Film Society; Sultan Mahmud, Country Director of Save the Children Australia; Film star Ilias Kanchan were among them. Many children organisations including UNICEF, Save the Children praised Durbeen as a successful film. The film was shown in many district towns in Bangladesh.
