= Shaheb Name Golam =

Bangladeshi film

- VCD cover
- Directed by: Raju Chowdhury
- Written by: Raju Chowdhury
- Produced by: Md Korshed Alam Khosru
- Starring: Shakib Khan; Moushumi; Sahara; Nirob; Racy; Misha Sawdagor; Omar Sani; Danny Sidak; Nagma
- Music by: Imon Saha
- Distributed by: Md Khorshed Alam Khosru
- Release date: 2009
- Country: Bangladesh
- Language: Bengali

Shaheb Name Golam (Bengali: সাহেব নামে গোলাম) is a Bangladeshi Bengali-language film written and directed by Raju Chowdhury, produced and distributed by Md Khorshed Alam Khosru. A remake of Bengali film Manik, it stars Shakib Khan and Moushumi in the lead roles. It also features Sahara, Nirob, Racy, Misha Sawdagor, Omar Sani, Danny Sidak, Nagma in supporting roles.

== Cast ==
- Shakib Khan as Munna / Shaheb
- Moushumi as Ratna Chowdhury
- Sahara as Roza
- Nirab
- Racy
- Misha Sawdagor
- Omar Sani
- Danny Sidak
- Nagma

== Crew ==
- Director: Raju Chowdhury
- Producer: Md Khorshed Alam Khosru
- Story: Raju Chowdhury
- Script: Raju Chowdhury
- Music: Emon Saha
- Lyrics: Kabir Bokul
- Distributor: Md Khorshed Alam Khosru

== Music ==
Shaheb Name Golam

Soundtrack album by Emon Saha
- Released: 2009 (Bangladesh)
- Recorded: 2009
- Genre: Films Sound Track
- Label: Anupom
- Producer: Anupom

The film music was directed by Emon Saha.

=== Soundtrack ===
Track's	Title's	Singer's	Performer's
1	Cheyechi Cheyechi Tomake (This song copied from Telugu song Yamaho Yama from movie Chirutha)	S I Tutul & Mila	Shakib Khan & Sahara
2	Shaheb Name Golam Ami	Monir Khan	Shakib Khan
3	Amar Mon Jokhon Tomake	S I Tutul & Sabina Yasmin	Shakib Khan and Sahara
4	Shurovi, Tumi Amar Madhobi	Onima and Asif	Nirab and Racy
5	Gashe Gashe Lota Pata	Somir Kowel & Komol	Shakib Khan, Nirab and Moushumi
6	Jilimili Jilimili	Rupom & Onima	Omar Sani

== Home media ==
The DVD and VCD of the film were released in 2011 by Anupom.
