= Jaan Kurbaan =

Bangladeshi romantic action film

- Theatrical release poster
- Directed by: M B Manik
- Screenplay by: M B Manik
- Story by: Kashem Ali Dulal
- Produced by: Monir and Kamal
- Starring: Shakib Khan; Apu Biswas
- Cinematography: Assuddinzaman Mazno
- Edited by: Zinnath Hossin Zinnath
- Music by: Ali Akram Shaovo
- Distributed by: Five Star Movies
- Release date: 31 August 2011
- Running time: 157 mins
- Country: Bangladesh
- Language: Bengali

Jaan Kurbaan (Bengali: জান কোরবান; English: Life Sacrifice) is a 2011 Bengali romantic action film directed by M B Manik. The film was produced by Mehdi Hasan Siddiki Monir and features Shakib Khan and Apu Biswas in the lead roles. It also had Nuton, Ali Raj, Afzal Sharif, Harun Kisinger, Ilias Kobra, Shiba Shanu and Misha Sawdagor in supporting roles. Jaan Kurbaan was released on Eid, 31 August 2011.

The film was a remake of 2007 Tamil language film Malaikottai starring Vishal & Priyamani.

== Cast ==
- Shakib Khan - Jibon Rahman
- Apu Biswas - Saathi
- Ali Raj - Raihan Rahman, an inspector of Police, oldest brother of Jibon Rahman
- Misha Sawdagor - Salman Mirza, City's biggest Mafia Don
- Shiba Shanu - Aslam Mirza, youngest brother of Salman Mirza
- Ilias Kobra - Maternal uncle of Mirza brother's
- Rebeka Rouf - Saathi's mother
- Afzal Sharif - Salman Mirza's Gang
- Nuton - Police Officer, Raihan Rahman's ex-girlfriend
- Gulshan Ara Ahmed
- Harun Kisinger - Special Appearance

== Soundtrack ==
The music was composed by Ali Akram Shuvo.

=== Track listing ===
No.	Title	Singer(s)	Length
1.	"Eshona Bachi"	S I Tutul	4:10
2.	"Hey Baby, Hey Baby"	S I Tutul, DJ	3:59
3.	"Karo Preme (This song copied from Telugu song Daddy Mummy from movie Villu"	Doli Shayontoni	4:11
4.	"Moner Vitor Bakum Bak Bak"	S I Tutul, Kanak Chapa	3:59
5.	"Sathe Peyechi Jibon ( (This song copied from Telugu song Nuvvunte from movie Arya)""	Andrew Kishore, Sabina Yasmin	4:11
