= Doly Shaontoni =

Bangladeshi playback singer

Doly Shaontoni ডলি শায়ন্তনী
- Born: 3 April 1974 (age 52); Pabna, Bangladesh
- Genres: Folk, film, fusion, pop
- Occupation: Playback singer
- Instrument: Vocals
- Years active: 1992–present
- Website: dolyshaontoni.net

Doly Shaontoni (born 3 April 1974) is a Bangladeshi playback singer and businesswoman. She releases solo, duet, and mixed albums, and also songs for Bangladeshi cinema. She released 15 solo albums, over 100 duet songs and mixed albums, and also sings in over 700 Bengali films. Her notable film playback songs include "Tomare Tomare", "O Pakhi Re", "Tui Jodi Hoiti Bhala", "Ek Jhak Pakhi", and "Boli Boli Kore". Shaontoni has sung for many Bangladeshi films, starting with Utthan Poton (1992). Her film songs span from the 1990s to the 2010s.

In November 2023, Shaontoni submitted papers as a Bangladesh Nationalist Movement candidate to represent the Pabna-2 constituency for the 2024 Bangladeshi general election.

== Early life ==
Doly Shaontoni was born in Pabna to Monowara Begum, a folk singer. Her other siblings, Badsha Bulbul and Poly Shaontoni, are also musicians. Monowara used to sing regularly at the Durbar event of Bangladesh Radio, including a song titled Curly Curly Hair. Shaontoni started working as a child artist at Bangladesh Radio. Her radio show was called Kolokakoli. She started working as a child singer listed only for Bangladesh Radio in 1984. Her first album was released by Milton Khondokar in 1989.

== Discography ==
=== Solo albums ===
- Hey Jubok
- Kalia
- Birohi Prohor
- Ranger Duniya
- Ekla Hobi
- Nitaigonje Jomce Mela
- Nirob Rate
- Dorodi
- Bhoor
- Binodini
- De De Mon

=== Mixed albums ===
- Bondhur Bari
- Jai Jai Din
- Dukkho Sukher Golpo
- Asha Amr Asha
- Aponer Alon
- Project
- Valobasha Priyo
- Nishi Rater Valobasha
- Ek Jonome
- Boro Sundori Tumi
- Bandhaile Mon
- Premer Guru

== Filmography ==
- Utthan Poton - 1992
- Coolie - 1997
- Tiger - 1997
- Ke Amar Baba - 1999
- Madam Fuli - 1999
- Pagla Ghonta - 1999
- Ononto Bhalobasa - 1999
- Karagar - 2003
- Char Sotiner Ghar - 2005
- Jibon Moroner Sathi - 2011
- Boss Number One - 2011
- Khodar Pore Ma - 2012
- Don Number One - 2012
- Full & FInal - 2013
- Lalchar - 2015
- Meyeti Ekhon Kothay Jabe - 2017
