= Nagma (Bangladeshi actress) =

Bangladeshi actress

- Born: c. 1975
- Died: 28 September 2015 (aged 40)
- Occupation: Actress

Nagma (c. 1975 – 28 September 2015) was a Bangladeshi film actress. She acted in over 150 films. She was known for acting in negative roles.

== Biography ==
Nagma's real name was Salma Aktar Lina. Her first film was Khuner Bodla which was released in 1994. Later, she appeared in over 150 films.

Nagma died on 28 September 2015 at the age of 40.

== Selected filmography ==
- Khuner Bodla
- Swami Keno Asami
- Meyerao Manush
- Akheri Jobab
- Saheb Name Golam
- Asami Greftar
- Swami Hara Sundori
- Bishe Vora Nagin
- Daini Buri
- Shaktir Lorai
- Chorer rani
- Dearing
