= Misha Sawdagor =

Bangladeshi film actor (born 1966)

- মিশা সওদাগর
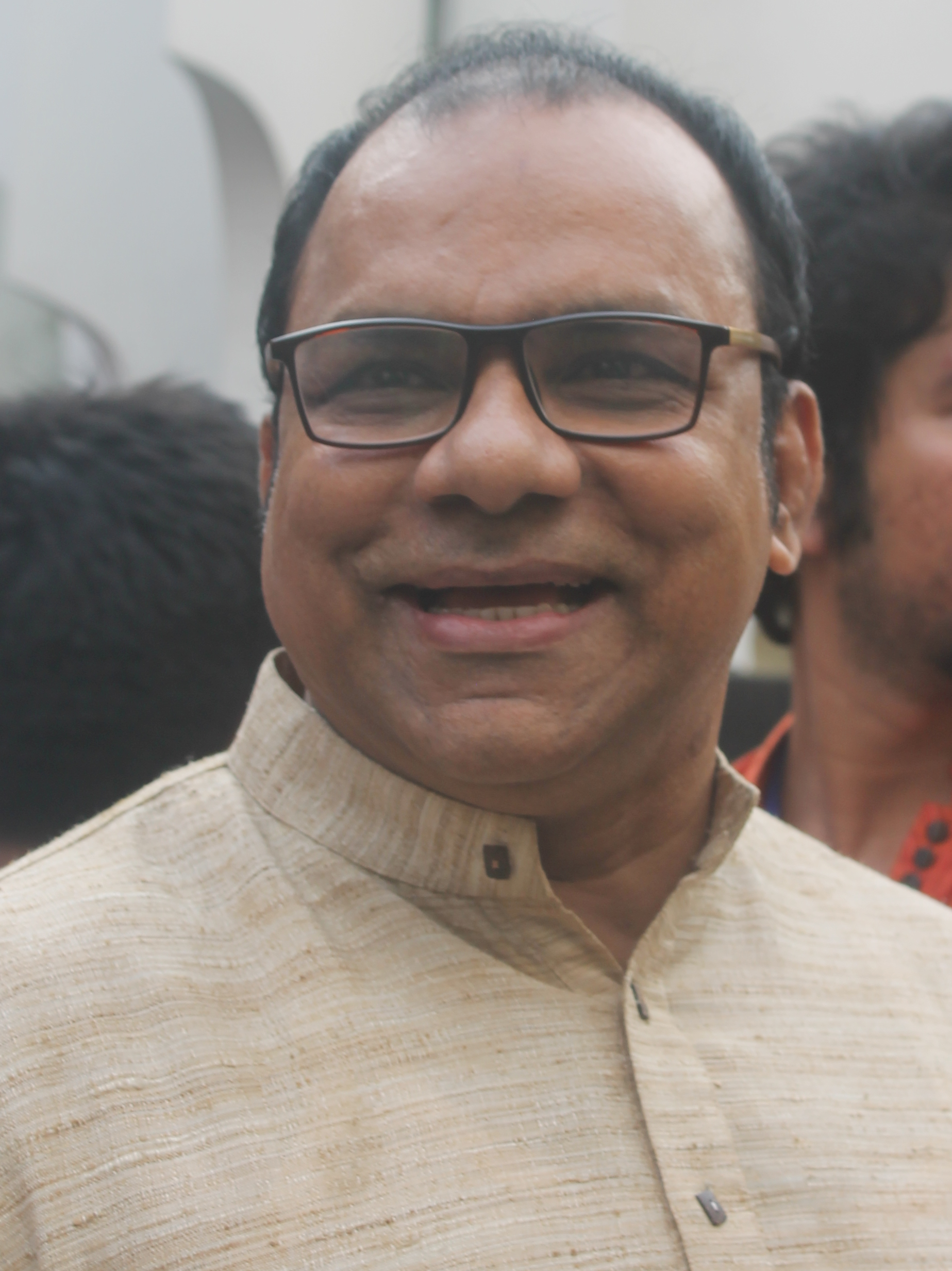
- Sawdagor in 2018
- Born: Shahid Hasan; 4 January 1966 (age 60); Dhaka, East Pakistan
- Occupation: Actor
- Years active: 1986–present
- Spouse: Zobaida Rabbani Mita (m. 1993)
- Children: 2

Shahid Hasan (born 4 January 1966), known professionally as Misha Sawdagor, is a Bangladeshi film actor known for playing villains. As of 2020, according to him, he has performed in more than 700 films. He won Bangladesh National Film Awards 3 times for his roles in the films Boss Number One (2011), Olpo Olpo Premer Golpo (2014), and Bir (2020). He first got noticed as a villain in the 1995 film Asha Bhalobasha, starring Salman Shah. After Shah's death, he continued playing the villain opposite other actors, but failed to achieve any mainstream success or recognition. From 2006 onwards, he started playing the main antagonist in a long string of hit movies starring Shakib Khan in the lead role and mostly Apu Biswas as the lead actress. He established himself as a leading antagonist in the cinema of Bangladesh.

== Early life ==
Shahid Hasan was born on 4 January 1966 in Old Dhaka, the fourth of five children of Bilkis Rashida and Osman Gani.

Sawdagor was discovered through a talent hunt programme organized by the Bangladesh Film Development Corporation in 1986 to find new faces. He selected the stage name "Misha Sawdagor", constructed from the first letters of his wife's name, Mita, and those of his name, combined with his grandfather's last name, Sawdagor.

== Career ==
Misha Sawdagor was selected in the New Face Program organized by the Bangladesh Film Development Corporation (BFDC) in 1986. In 1990, he acted as the lead hero in two films named Chetona and Omor Shongi, both directed by Chhatku Ahmed. Neither film was successful. His career took off after he played the villain role in Tamij Uddin Rizvi's 1995 film Asha Bhalobasha. However, Jachche Bhalobasha (1994) was his first release as a villain. In 1999, he collaborated with Shakib Khan for the first time in Sohanur Rahman Sohan's romance drama Ananta Bhalobasha. His collaboration with Shakib Khan as a villain is considered one of the greatest hero-villain pairings in the history of Bangladeshi cinema. In 2011, he earned his first National Film Award for his negative role in Badiul Alam Khokon's Ontari (2008) remake Boss Number One.

== Personal life ==
Sawdagor married Zobaida Rabbani Mita in 1993. Together they have two sons.

== Filmography ==
†	Denotes films that have not yet been released

Year	Film(s)	Role(s)	Note(s)	Ref.
1990	Chetona			
1990	Omor Songi			
1995	Asha Bhalobasa			
1996	Jibon Songsar			
1996	Sotter Mrittu Nei			
1997	Prem Piyashi			
1997	Buker Bhitor Agun			
1998	Shanto Keno Mastan			
1999	Ananta Bhalobasa	Rana		
2005	Agun Amar Naam			
2005	Banglar Bagh			
2006	Didima			
2006	Chachchu	Dulu Mirza		
2007	Shotru Shotru Khela			
2007	Bou er Jala			
2007	Kabin Naama			
2007	Maa Amar Swargo			
2007	Swamir Songsar			
2007	Katha Dao Shathi Hobey			
2008	Somadhi			
2008	Mone Prane Acho Tumi			
2008	Jodi Bou Sajogo			
2008	Sontan Amar Ohongkar			
2008	Amar Jaan Amar Pran			
2008	Tumi Amar Prem			
2008	Amader Choto Saheb			
2008	Tumi Swapno Tumi Sadhona			
2009	Mon Jekhane Hridoy Sekhane			
2009	Sobai To Bhalobasa Chay			
2009	Shaheb Name Golam			
2009	Jonmo Tomar Jonno			
2010	Bhalobaslei Ghor Bandha Jay Na			
2010	Hay Prem Hay Bhalobasa			
2010	Bolo Na Tumi Amar			
2010	Poran Jay Jolai Re			
2010	Takar Cheye Prem Boro			
2010	Bostir Chele Kotipoti			
2011	Mayer Jonno Pagol			
2011	Astro Charo Kolom Dhoro			
2011	Wanted			
2011	Moner Jala			
2011	Ontore Acho Tumi			
2011	Darowaner Chele			
2011	Bondhu Tumi Shotru Tumi			
2011	Koti Takar Prem			
2011	Tor Karone Beche Achi			
2011	Ekbar Bolo Bhalobashi			
2011	Goriber Vai			
2011	Jaan Kurbaan			
2011	Tiger Number One			
2011	Amar Prithibi Tumi			
2011	Ongko			
2011	Chompa Ranir Akhra			
2011	Garments Konna			
2011	Moner Ghore Boshot Kore			
2011	Boss Number One			
2011	King Khan			
2011	Priya Amar Jaan			
2011	Ke Apon Ke Por			
2011	Pita Putrer Golpo			
2011	Adorer Jamai			
2012	Maruf Er Challenge			
2012	Amar Challenge			
2012	Ek Takar Denmohor			
2012	Ek Mon Ek Pran			
2012	Bazarer Kuli			
2012	Sontaner Moto Sontan			
2012	Dhakar King			
2012	Khodar Pore Ma			
2012	Most Welcome			
2012	My Name Is Sultan			
2012	Se Amar Mon Kereche			
2012	Ziddi Mama			
2013	Jor Kore Bhalobasha Hoy Na			
2013	Judge Barrister Police Commissioner			
2013	Jotil Prem			
2013	Nishpap Munna			
2013	Poramon			
2013	Nishwartha Bhalobasa			
2013	Bhalobasha Aaj Kal			
2013	My Name is Khan			
2013	Premik Number One			
2014	Ki Darun Dekhte			
2014	Agnee			
2014	Akash Koto Dure			
2014	Daring Lover			
2014	Bhalobasa Express			
2014	Ami Shudhu Cheyechi Tomay		Indo-Bangladesh joint production	
2014	Most Welcome 2			
2014	I Don't Care			
2014	Hero: The Superstar			
2014	Olpo Olpo Premer Golpo	Bishu		
2014	Kistimaat			
2014	Hitman			
2014	Shera Nayak			
2014	Kothin Protishodh			
2014	My Name is Simi			
2014	Prem Korbo Tomar Sathe			
2014	Shopnochhoya			
2014	Bhalobaste Mon Lage			
2015	Putra Ahan Paisawala			
2015	Pagla Diwana			
2015	Chuye Dile Mon			
2015	Warning			
2015	Action Jasmine			
2015	Dui Prithibi			
2015	U-Turn	Israfil Shahid		
2015	Love Marriage			
2015	Black Money			
2015	Blackmail			
2015	Rajababu: The Power			
2015	Antore Antore			
2015	Cheleti Abol Tabol Meyeti Pagol Pagol			
2015	Nagar Mastan			
2015	Anil Bagchir Ekdin			
2016	Mia Bibi Razi			
2016	Utola Mon			
2016	Musafir			
2016	Mental			
2016	Samraat: The King Is Here			
2016	Shooter			
2016	Ami Tomar Hote Chai			
2017	Yeh Galpe Bhalobasha Nei			
2017	Missed Call			
2017	Sultana Bibiana			
2017	Apon Manush			
2017	Game Returns			
2018	Pagol Manush			
2018	Poloke Poloke Tomake Chai			
2018	Swapnajaal			
2018	Captain Khan			
2018	Jannat			
2018	Mone Rekho			
2018	Panku Jamai			
2018	Matal			
2019	Amar Prem Amar Priya			
2019	Ondokar Jogoth			
2019	Password			
2019	Bhalobasha.com			
2019	Moner Moto Manush Pailam Na			
2019	Obotar			
2019	Dongiri			
2020	Bir			
2020	Shahenshah			
2021	Mission Extreme	Mr. Khan		
2022	Mafia	Awlad Pathan "Miya Bhai"		
2022	Din–The Day	Police Commissioner		
2022	Shaan			
2022	Bidrohi			
2023	Local			
2023	Kill Him			
2023	Prem Pritir Bandhan			
2023	Leader: Amie Bangladesh	Azim Millat		
2023	Shatru			
2023	Mujib: The Making of Nation	General Ayub Khan		
2024	Ahare Jibon			
2024	Lipstick			
2024	Toofan	Bashir		
2024	Jimmi			
2025	Borbaad	Adib Mirza		
2025	Insaaf	Sushil Shaheen		
2025	Esha Murder: The Cycle of Karma	Rahman	Special appearance	
2025	Ali			
2025	Goar			
2026	Pressure Cooker	Adnan Shiekh		
2026	Malik	Alauddin		
2026	Officer			
2026	Tosnos	Osman Shikdar		
TBA	Onabrito†			
TBA	Jam†			
TBA	Operation Agneepath†	Julfiqar Mirza		

=== Web series ===
Year	Series	Character	Director
2023	Kabadi	Badiuzzaman Badi	Rubayet Mahmud

== Awards and nominations ==
Year	Award	Category	Film	Result	Ref(s)
2011	Bangladesh National Film Awards	Best Performance in a Negative Role	Boss Number One	Won (jointly)	
2014	Bangladesh National Film Awards	Best Performance in a Comic Role	Olpo Olpo Premer Golpo	Won	
2018	Bachsas Awards	Best Supporting Actor (Male)	Jannat	Won	
2020	Bangladesh National Film Awards	Best Performance in a Negative Role	Bir	Won	
2026	Dhallywood Film and Music Awards	Best Supporting Actor (critics' choice)	Borbaad	Won	
