= M B Manik =

Bangladeshi filmmaker

M B Manik (1971 – 15 May 2014) was a Bangladeshi filmmaker. He made his debut with Durdorsho in 2005 featuring Shakib Khan. He directed total 36 films, most of his notable films with Khan, whice including Kothin Prem, Prem Koyedi, Jaan Amar Jaan, Jaan Kurbaan, Ek Takar Denmohor, Jadrel, Bolona Tumi Amar, and Durdorsho Premik.

== Death ==
Manik was killed in a robbery in the United States. His family lived in the US. He owned a store out there as well. On 15 May 2014, people came to his shop asking for money. At one point of the heated conversation that ensued, he was shot by one of them. Critically injured, Manik was immediately taken to a hospital, but the doctors declared him dead. When his body was returned to his country, many Bangladeshi film actors and directors went to his residence and paid tribute. Manik is buried in Feni Sadar Upazila, Bangladesh.

== Filmography ==
- Durdhorsho (2005)
- Jadrel (2006)
- Prem Koyedi (2009)
- Jaan Amar Jaan (2009)
- Bolona Tumi Amar (2010)
- Tor Karone Beche Achi (2011)
- Jaan Kurbaan (2011)
- Ek Takar Denmohor (2012)
