= List of Bangladeshi films of 2002 =

This is a list of Bangladeshi films that were released in 2002.

Opening	Title	Director	Cast	Genre	Ref.
14 February	Itihaas	Kazi Hayat	Kazi Maruf, Monwar Hossain Dipjol, Ratna Kabir Sweety	Action, crime	
15 May	Matir Moina	Tareque Masud	Jayanta Chattopadhyay, Rokeya Prachi	Drama, history	
12 June	Phulkumar	Ashique Mostafa	Krishnendu Chattopadhyay, Parvin Kona, Sumita Devi	Drama	
15 August	Moner Majhe Tumi	K. Vasu	Riaz, Purnima, Jisshu Sengupta	Drama, romance	
16 August	Mastaner Upor Mastan	Montazur Rahman Akbar	Manna, Purnima, Misha Swadagor	action thriller	

== See also ==
- 2002 in Bangladesh
