= Ora Amake Valo Hote Dilo Na =

- Movie poster
- Directed by: Kazi Hayat
- Screenplay by: Kazi Hayat
- Produced by: Shahnaz Parveen Dulari
- Starring: Kazi Maruf; Purnima; Bobita; Kazi Hayat; Mizu Ahmed
- Cinematography: S. D. Babul
- Edited by: Amjad Hossain
- Music by: Alauddin Ali; Ali Akram Shuvo; Shawkat Ali Emon
- Production company: Riya Jyoti Films
- Distributed by: Riya Jyoti Films
- Release date: 2010
- Running time: 151 minutes
- Country: Bangladesh
- Language: Bengali

Ora Amake Bhalo Hote Dilo Na is a 2010 Bangla drama film written and directed by Kazi Hayat. It was produced by actress Shahnaz Parveen Dulari. It stars Kazi Maruf, Purnima, Babita, Kazi Hayat, Mizu Ahmed and Ahmed Sharif. Purnima won Bangladesh National Film Award for Best actress for her performance in this film and Mizu Ahmed won the Bangladesh National Film Award for Best Villain.

== Cast ==
- Kazi Maruf as Maruf
- Purnima as Shetu
- Sanai as Shanu
- Bobita as Nurjahan
- Kazi Hayat as Dhumketu
- Mizu Ahmed as Johurul
- Ahmed Sharif as Sharif
- Kabila as Akram
- Nasreen as Akram's wife
- Shahnaz Parveen Dulari as Shetu's mother
- Siraj Haider as Shiraj
- Subrata as Advocate
- Jacky Alamgir as Alamgir
- Kala Ajij
- Chashi Nazrul Islam as Professor

== Award ==
- Bangladesh National Film Award for Best actress - Purnima
- Bangladesh National Film Award for Best Negative Role - Mizu Ahmed
