= Monsoon Films =

- Company type: Private
- Industry: Entertainment
- Founded: Dhaka, Bangladesh in 2010
- Founder: Ananta Jalil
- Headquarters: Kakrail, Dhaka, Bangladesh
- Key people: Afiea Nusrat Barsha (managing director)
- Products: Films
- Owner: Ananta Jalil
- Website: monsoonfilmsbd.com

Monsoon Films is a Bangladeshi entertainment company established by Ananta Jalil, a Bangladeshi film actor, director and producer. His wife Afiea Nusrat Barsha is managing director of Monsoon Films.

== Films produced by Monsoon Films ==
Year	Film	Director
2010	Khoj: The Search	Iftakar Chowdhury
2011	Hridoy Bhanga Dheu	Gazi Mazharul Anwar
2012	The Speed	Sohanur Rahman Sohan
2012	Most Welcome	Anonno Mamun
2013	Nishwartha Bhalobasa	Ananta Jalil
2014	Most Welcome 2	Ananta Jalil
2015	The Spy	Ananta Jalil
2022	The Day	Morteza Atashzamzam
TBA	Netri–The Leader	Ananta Jalil
TBA	The Last Hope	TBA
