= Rajotto =

Bangladeshi crime action thriller film

- Theatrical release poster
- Directed by: Iftakar Chowdhury
- Written by: Abdullah Zahir Babu
- Produced by: Adit Ozbert
- Starring: Shakib Khan; Eamin Haque Boby
- Music by: Adit
- Production company: Fatman Films
- Distributed by: Fatman Films
- Release date: 7 March 2014
- Running time: 144 minutes
- Country: Bangladesh
- Language: Bengali

Rajotto (Bengali: রাজত্ব; transl. The Kingdom) is a Bangladeshi crime action thriller film directed by Iftakar Chowdhury and produced by Adit Ozbert under Fatman Films, which was his second production, earlier he produced Dehorokkhi, which was also a commercial success. It features Shakib Khan and Eamin Haque Bobby in lead roles. The film's soundtrack was composed by Adit Ozbert. It is about the deadly journey of a gangster. Some of the scenes are borrowed from the 2006 Telugu film Pokiri.

The film received huge response from the audience and Bobby's pairing with Khan was highly appreciated. It was one of the successful films of 2014.

== Plot ==
Samraat is a local gangster, who works only with his three friends, and charges anyone doing business in his area. He gets in a fight with a bigger gangster in the city when he prevents them from charging for businesses in his area. In an ensuring shootout, Samraat kills his all men and gets him arrested.

After a few days, his mother comes from the village to meet him and she thinks he is a police officer like his father. She gets emotional when she sees his father's motorcycle still kept with care by Samraat. One night, his bike breaks down in middle and he parks it in the house of a local and sees Rihanna and immediately falls in love with her. Next day, when he goes to her house to take the bike, She informs that she cannot give the bike. Upon asking the reason, she denies to answer. So, he files a complaint in the police station but in vain. Then he searches the local garages and hideouts of bike thieves, but too in vain. He then tries to woo Rihanna in order to know about his bike.

In the meantime, Rihanna's sister Tulona gets sick and is taken to the hospital, where it is revealed that Tulona was raped the day Samraat's bike had broken down, by the brother of an international gangster Juala who also stole his bike. He vows to take revenge and so he thrashes them badly and takes the rapist to the police station under a corrupt Officer in-Charge (OC), and gets him arrested. Due to this action, Rihanna falls in love with Samraat.

Meanwhile, Juala learns about this and sends his men to kill Samraat but are unable to do so. The OC joins hands with Juala and releases his brother. Due to this shock their father dies. Juala sends his men to kill both the sisters but is saved by Samraat. Meanwhile, the gangster then buys the doctor who did the medical examination of Tulona and manipulates the reports. Juala's brother and son then attempt to kill Samraat but saves himself.

The OC then discovers that Samraat is actually ACP Wahid Murad Samraat who works in the CID, and is in disguise as a gangster in order to finish the underworld and he informs this to Juala who thinks that Samraat is dead. Samraat then personally confronts the OC and the doctor and arrests and interrogates them personally. The OC informs him that they will kill his family. Juala and his son then kills Tulona and his mother and kidnaps Rihanna. In an ensuing fight Samraat kills Juala, his son, brother and all their henchmen and unites with Rihanna.

== Cast ==
- Shakib Khan as Samraat, a gangster, who turned out an undercover police official
- Bobby Haque as Rihhana
- Arefin Iqbal
- Ratan Khan as one of Samraat's friends
- Prabir Mitra as Yousuf, Rihhana's father
- Rebeka Rouf as Samraat's mother
- Zamilur Rahman Shakha
- Amir Siraji as Raisool Juhala, father of Kibria Juhala
- Sanko Panja as Kibria Juhala, oldest song of Raisool Juahala
- Dany Raj

== Production ==
"Rajotto is my dream project. Everyone has worked hard for the film. Every scene of the film is worth enjoying."

— Adit Ozbert about Rajotto.

The principal photography of the film began on 21 August 2013. Its screenplay was written by Abdullah Zahir Babu under direction of Iftekhar Chowdhury, which is his fourth directorial venture.

== Soundtrack ==
Rajotto

Soundtrack album by Adit Ozbert
- Released: 28 February 2014
- Recorded: 2013–14
- Studio: Fatman Films
- Genre: Film soundtrack
- Length: 23:33
- Language: Bengali
- Label: Eagle Music
- Producer: Adit Ozbert

Adit Ozbert chronology
Agnee (2014)	Rajotto (2014)	Big Brother (2015)

Singles from Rajotto
- 1. "Moner Majhe" Released: 12 November 2013; 2. "Tomake Bhalobashi" Released: 2 March 2014

The film's soundtrack is composed by Adit Ozbert with the lyrics penned by Shohel Arman, Kevin Melnick and Rabiul Islam Jibon. The soundtrack features 5 tracks overall. The song "Moner Majhe" was revealed as a promotional single on 12 November 2013. It's another song titled "Tomake Bhalobashi" was revealed on 2 March 2014. The soundtrack album of the film was released as audio in February 2014.

Track listing
No.	Title	Singer(s)	Length
1.	"Moner Majhe"	Hasib and Dola Rahman	4:40
2.	"Tomake Bhalobashi"	Hasib and Dilshad Nahar Kona	5:09
3.	"Bhalobashi Priyo"	Hasib and Kheya	5:10
4.	"Jouboti Konna"	Dola Rahman	4:16
5.	"Choya"	Elita Karim	4:18
Total length:			23:33

== Release ==
The film was released on 7 March 2014, in 150 cinemas around the country. It was breaking Iftekhar's own Agnee's record, which is about to hit the highest number of halls on the first day of release at that time.

=== Reception ===
The film turned out be hit and received critically positive reviews, especially Khan's performance was highly praised by the critics. Syed Nazmus Sakib of Bangla Movie Database cited that "He has dragged the whole film alone." He also noted, "There are so many flaws and deviations in the whole film - it can be forgiven only because of the performance of one person - he is Shakib Khan."
