= Fatman Films =

Music and film production company

- Company type: Film Production; Music
- Industry: Entertainment; Music
- Founded: 2011
- Headquarters: Dhaka, Bangladesh
- Key people: Adit Ozbert
- Services: Music Label, Studio production, marketing and distribution
- Website: Fatman Films

Fatman Films, is a music company and film production company of Bangladesh. The company was established in 2011 by musician Adit Ozbert. Fatman Industries is a well known private investor and affiliate. The company specializes in music production, film production and distribution.

== Films ==
Following are the list of notable films produced and distributed by Fatman Films:

Year	Film	Director	Cast
2013	Dehorokkhi	Iftakar Chowdhury	Kazi Maruf, Eamin Haque Bobby, Anisur Rahman Milon
2014	Rajotto	Iftakar Chowdhury	Shakib Khan, Eamin Haque Bobby
2015	Big Brother	Shafi Uddin Shafi	Mahiya Mahi, Shipan Mitra, Danny Sidak
2016	Rokkha	Iftakar Chowdhury	Eamin Haque Bobby
2016	Aadi	Taneem Rahman Angshu	ABM Sumon, Shaila Sabi

== Music industry and other ==
Along with producing films, Fatman Films have also produced some noteworthy music albums including Ontohin, Fatmaz Inc, Porshi III and several other popular albums. Fatman Films were also involved a handful of TV commercials for Grameenphone, Advanced Chemical Industries, and Banglalink.
