= Simin =

Simin may refer to:

- Simin (name)
- Simin, Iran
- Simin (film), a 2018 Iranian film
- Simin-e Abaru, Iran
- Simin-e Zagheh, Iran
- Karl Simin
- Rhyu Si-min
- Xu Simin
