= Shimin =

Shimin is a Chinese given name. Notable people with the given name include:

- Alexander Shimin (born 1970), Kazakhstani former ice hockey goaltender and coach
- Fang Shimin, pen name Fang Zhouzi, Chinese science writer
- Li Shimin, Emperor Taizong of Tang (598–649), second emperor of the Tang dynasty of China
- Wang Shimin (1592–1680), Chinese landscape painter during the late Ming Dynasty and early Qing Dynasty
- Yan Shimin (born 1987), Chinese rower

== See also ==
- The Prince of Qin, Li Shimin, 2005 Chinese television series
- Shi Min (disambiguation)
- Shiming
- Shimmin
- Simin (disambiguation)
