= Afiea Nusrat Barsha =

Bangladeshi actress

- আফিয়া নুসরাত বর্ষা
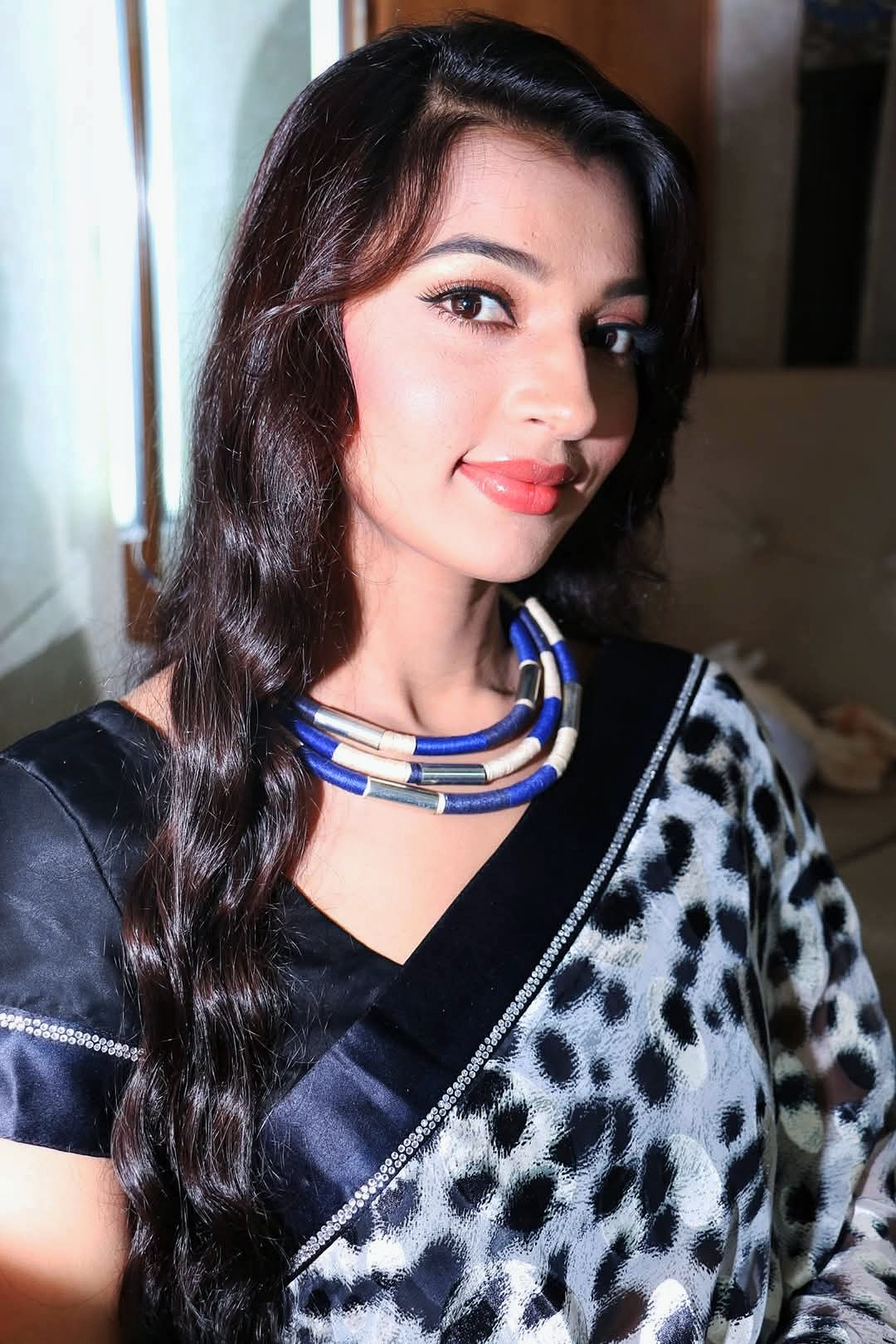
- Barsha in 2016
- Born: Khadiza Parvin Barsha; 28 February 1989 (age 37); Shahzadpur, Sirajganj, Bangladesh
- Occupations: Film actress; model; producer
- Years active: 2010–present
- Organization: Monsoon Films
- Spouse: Ananta Jalil (m. 2011)
- Children: 2
- Awards: Full list

Afiea Nusrat Barsha, known as Barsha, is a Bangladeshi actress and YouTuber. Starting her career as a model, she made her feature film debut in Iftakar Chowdhury's 2010 film Khoj: The Search with another newcomer Ananta Jalil. She had roles in the films Khoj: The Search, Hriday Bhanga Dheu and Most Welcome. She starring the Bangladeshi Film Din–The Day (2022) was released on 10 July 2022.

== Early life ==
Barsha was born as Afiea Nusrat Barsha in Shahzadpur, Sirajganj, Bangladesh.

== Personal life ==
Barsha married Ananta Jalil in 2011. Together they have two sons, Ariz Ibn Jalil and Abrar Ibn Jalil.

In early 2013, Ananta and Barsha started divorce proceedings after Ananta claimed he caught Barsha having affairs with several men and claimed to have proof. Barsha sued Ananta for compensation for allegedly beating her. They later reconciled.

== Filmography ==
Year	Film	Role	Director	Notes
2010	Khoj: The Search	Elisha	Iftakar Chowdhury	
2011	Hridoy Bhanga Dheu	Barsha	Gazi Mazharul Anwar	
2012	Most Welcome	Adhora Chawdhury	Anonno Mamun	
2013	Nishwartha Bhalobasa	Meghla	Ananta Jalil	
2014	Most Welcome 2	Adhora Chowdhary	Ananta Jalil	
2022	Din–The Day	Azin	Morteza Atashzamzam	Iran-Bangladesh joint production
2023	Kill Him	Ginia	Mohammed Iqbal	
TBA	Netri - The Leader †	TBA	Ananta Jalil	Filming
TBA	The Last Hope †	TBA	Ananta Jalil	Norwegian Film, Announced
TBA	The Spy: Agrojatrar Mohanayok †	TBA	Ananta Jalil	Unreleased

== Awards and nominations ==
Year	Awards	Category	Film/works	Result
2011		Best Model	Keya Coconut Hair Oil	Nominated
2011	Meril Prothom Alo Awards	Best Actress	Hridoy Bhanga Dhew	Nominated
2011	Bachsas Award	Best Glamour Heroine	Hridoy Bhanga Dhew	Won
2011		Best Model	Meril Splash Beauty Soap	Won
2012	Meril Prothom Alo Awards	Best Actress	Most Welcome	Nominated
2012	CJFB Performance Award 2014	Best Actress	Most Welcome	Won
2013	Bioscope Borsho-sera	Best Couple (with Ananta Jalil )	Nishwartha Bhalobasa	Won
