= Agnee (franchise) =

Bangladeshi action-drama film franchise

- Created by: Iftakar Chowdhury
- Original work: Agnee (2014 film)
- Owner: Jaaz Multimedia
- Years: 2014-present

Films and television
- Film(s): Agnee (2014 film); Agnee 2

Agnee is a Bangladeshi action-drama film franchise created by Iftakar Chowdhury. The films resolves around Tanisha, a stone-cold assassin who has lost her parents in childhood because of the underworld mafia Gulzar and Haydar. Agnee franchise films are among the most successful Bangladeshi action films. The first Agnee film was a blockbuster hit which changed the view of action films in the Bangladesh film industry.

== Overview ==
=== Agnee (2014) ===
Tanisha is a young daughter of a man working for the brutal underworld mafia Gulzar and Haydar. When Tanisha's father decides he wants to leave the crime world to make a better life for his daughter, Gulzar and Haydar kills him, and family in order to eliminate a potential threat. Gulzar kills everyone in the family, and when he is about to kill Tanisha, she stabs him and vows she will kill them one day before escaping. She grows up to be a stone-cold assassin. She receives training from her uncle and ultimately engages in vigilante murders that she hopes will lead her to her ultimate target, the powerful underworld crime syndicate responsible for her parents' death.

=== Agnee 2 (2015) ===
After defeating Gulzar and his gang to avenge father's death, Tanisha returns to Bangladesh with Sishir to live normal lives again. Sishir, Tanisha's boyfriend, once a deadly assassin and a member of Gulzar's crime syndicate who later turns good and Tanisha to avenge her father's death. Sishir decides to permanently return to Bangladesh for Tanisha but fails to return to Tanisha as Python, Gulzar's brother and leader of a large crime syndicate kills him to take revenge for Brother's death. Saddened by the death of Sishir, Tanisha vows to kill Python at any cost.

== Films ==
Film	Release date	Director	Writer	Producer
Agnee	14 February 2014	Iftakar Chowdhury	A J Babu	Abdul Aziz
Agnee 2	July 18, 2015	Iftakar Chowdhury	Md Amjad Hossen	Abdul Aziz

=== Agnee ===
Agnee was the first film of the series which was released on 14 February 2014. The film became a commercial hit. With the success of the first film. The creators went to make a sequel.

=== Agnee 2 ===
Agnee 2 is the sequel of Agnee. It is the second film of the series which was released on 18 July 2005. Like its predecessor, Agnee 2 was also a commercial hit.

== Cast and crew ==
These tables list the cast and crew who worked in the Agnee franchise.

=== Cast ===
List indicators

This section includes characters who will appear or have appeared in more than two films in the series.

- An empty grey cell indicates the character was not in the film, or that the character's official presence has not yet been confirmed.
- ^{A} indicates an appearance through archival footage or audio.
- ^{C} indicates a cameo role.
- ^{Y} indicates a younger version of the character.

Characters	Films	
Characters	Agnee	Agnee 2
Characters	2014	2015
Tanisha	Puja Cherry^{Y} Mahiya Mahi	
Shishir / Dragon	Arifin Shuvoo	^{A}
Gulzar	Ali Raj	
Haidar	Misha Sawdagor	
Python		Ashish Vidyarthi
Ishan		Om
Mithun Sarkar		Amit Hasan

=== Crew ===
Crew	Films	
Crew	Agnee	Agnee 2
Director	Iftakar Chowdhury	Iftakar Chowdhury
Producer	Abdul Aziz	Abdul Aziz
Composer	Adit Ozbert	Savvy Gupta & Akassh

== Reception ==
=== Box office performance ===
This is a list of Agnee franchise first two days performance at box office.

Film	Box office	Ref.
Agnee	৳20.4 crore	
Agnee 2	৳30.9 crore	
Total	৳51.3 crore	
