= Shao Hua =

Chinese photographer, military officer

- Born: Chen Anyun; 30 October 1938; Yan'an, Shaanxi, Republic of China
- Died: 24 June 2008 (aged 69); Beijing, People's Republic of China
- Education: Peking University
- Political party: Chinese Communist Party
- Spouse: Mao Anqing (m. 1960; died 2007)
- Children: Mao Xinyu
- Parent(s): Chen Zhenhua; Zhang Wenqiu
- Relatives: Mao Zedong (father-in-law)

Shao Hua (30 October 1938 – 24 June 2008), formerly known as Zhang Shaohua (Chinese: 张少华), was a Chinese photographer and a major general in the People's Liberation Army. She was the wife of Mao Anqing, the second son of Mao Zedong.

== Biography ==
She was born as Chen Anyun (Chinese: 陈安云) in October 1938 in Yan'an, Shaanxi, the headquarters of the Chinese Communist Party following the Long March. Her father was Chen Zhenhua, who was from Shimin, Hunan. Her mother was Zhang Wenqiu, who was from Jingshan County, Hubei.

Shao began working as a photographer in the 1950s using a camera which had been brought to her from the Soviet Union by Mao Zedong's eldest son, Mao Anying. She traveled extensively throughout China following the Chinese Civil War. The subjects of her photographs were often related to the Communist movement, including factories and other factors of production, army units, schools, and poor rural Chinese villages. She became the head of the China Photographers Association (CPA) in 2002 and served in that position until her death in 2008.

Shao was a major general in the People's Liberation Army. She served as the director of the military encyclopedia department of the PLA Academy of Military Sciences. Shao was a member of the National Committee of the Chinese People's Political Consultative Conference (CPPCC) from 1988 to 2002.

Shao married Mao Anqing, Mao Zedong's second son and a Russian linguist, in September 1960. The couple had one son, Mao Xinyu was born in 1970 at People's Liberation Army Hospital. Her husband had no active role in the Chinese government. Mao Anqing died on 23 March 2007, at the age of 84. Her son Mao Xinyu and his wife, Liu Bin, have one son Mao Dongdong who was born in 2003 at Peking Union Medical College Hospital and the only great-grandson of Mao Zedong.

Shao Hua died in Beijing due to breast cancer on 24 June 2008, at the age of 69.
