= Action Jasmine =

- Poster
- Directed by: Iftakar Chowdhury
- Written by: Joseph Satabdi
- Produced by: Khandokar Arifuzzaman
- Starring: Bobby Haque; Symon Sadik; Kabila; Misha Sawdagor; Mizu Ahmed
- Edited by: Touhid Hossain Chowdhury
- Production company: Universal Films
- Distributed by: Pinky Films; Tiger Media
- Release date: 15 May 2015
- Country: Bangladesh
- Language: Bengali

Action Jasmine is a 2015 Bangladeshi Bengali-language action drama film directed by Iftakar Chowdhury and produced by Khandokar Arifuzzaman and Sharif Uddin Khan Dipu under the banner of Universal Films. The film stars Bobby Haque as the titular character alongside Symon Sadik, Kabila, Misha Sawdagor, Mizu Ahmed and others.

It is a remake of the Indian Telugu-language film Vikramarkudu (2006) directed by S. S. Rajamouli.

== Cast ==
- Bobby Haque as Deepa / Inspector Jasmine
- Symon Sadik as Inspector Akash
- Kabila as Kabi Kha
- Misha Sawdagor as Bhaiji
- Mizu Ahmed as Moti Miah
- Zamilur Rahman Shakha as DIG Mominul
- Chikon Ali
- Bobby
- Shonkho Panja
- Dany Raj
- Prabir Mitra

== Production ==
The shooting of this film was started on 18 December, 2013 and the movie is filming in capital city of bangladesh (dhaka) and the film Action Jasmine gets censor clearance without any cuts on 5 March 2015.

== Release ==
The film was released in 90 theatres on 15 May 2015. film was premiered on ATN Bangla on 4th day of Eid al-Fitr of 2025.

== Reception ==
Jagonews24 wrote that (A song from the movie Action Jasmine has been released with the lyrics of such a song. The song has been released on YouTube under the title 'Paan Jadda Chaman'. The song was released on YouTube on Saturday, February 21. The song has received a lot of response since its release)

Mazhar Babu from ntv wrote that (actress Bobby's 'Action Jasmine' is playing in 83 cinema halls in Bangladesh. But many viewers are disappointed because the story of this film is similar to a previous Dhaka film. That's why many are leaving the cinema hall without finishing the film. Jhantu Mia, assistant manager of Purnima Cinema Hall in the capital, gave this reaction about 'Action Jasmine'. He said that this film was brought to the cinema hall for 1.5 lakh taka with high expectations. But now it is not possible to even cover the cost of running the film)

Zakia Aktar from channel i wrote that (The film has been a subject of controversy since its release . Many are saying that the film is similar to the Bollywood film 'Rowdy Rathore')

Bangla tribune wrote The movie was a flop movie,

Fatema Abedeen from Prothom Alo wrote that "The Bangladeshi film Action Jasmine is a remake of Hindi film Rowdy Rathore. However, the director took a little trouble. He didn't copy the original character. He just changed it a little. Rowdy Rathore's character was played by Akshay Kumar, who is a man. In the film Action Jasmine, the character was a woman, and this role was played by Bobby. It can be said that Bobby has come a long way as a heroine. Because in one role she had to shout in regional language and accent, and in another role she had to speak in pure language with fluent English. She seemed quite fluent in both. However, she was most fluent in winking. Here, two things cannot be said about the hero Symon. One can research why this character was in the movie. The hero was not seen even a quarter of the times that the thief heroine's associate Kabila was seen on screen. The hero was important in only two songs. So after watching the film, the question may arise in the mind of the viewer - was there a need for a hero? And it is better not to talk about the makeup-getup of this film. As a viewer, I express my gratitude to the director that there was no scene that was completely unwatchable. However, the 'Kabila' type comic character caused quite a bit of irritation. His indecent behavior is completely disrespectful".

Nabil Anusurjo from RisingBD wrote that "The songs of the movie are quite good, catchy. And the choreography of the songs is also quite pleasing to the eye. The heroine Bobby plays two roles in the movie. The choreography of both songs is quite pleasing to the eye. However, the choreography of the second song has to be given more marks considering the stage-background etc. Again, Deepa's song about her son Pappu is also great. Especially the use of the song in the movie (this use is also taken from the source movie). And the song "God knows" of the hero and heroine in the movie is also good. The other one is not bad either. Of course, the sound design of the movie is not that great. It often has flaws. However, the background of the heroine's action-appearance as Shahosh Onek Beshi/Ami Bangladeshi Tukro songs, which is used well. It might have been used a little more, but it wouldn't have been boring. The cinematography is relatively good. The color correction is also excellent in some places. But that consistency could not be maintained throughout the film. The location selection was good. Overall, the movie Action Jasmine gets a passing grade. And the movie is praised for at least three reasons – Bobby's lively presence throughout the movie, the songs that are both melodious and visually pleasing (at least two item songs), and the reflection of modern progressive femininity in the story".
