= Ananta Jalil =

Bangladeshi actor, director, producer and businessman

- অনন্ত জলিল
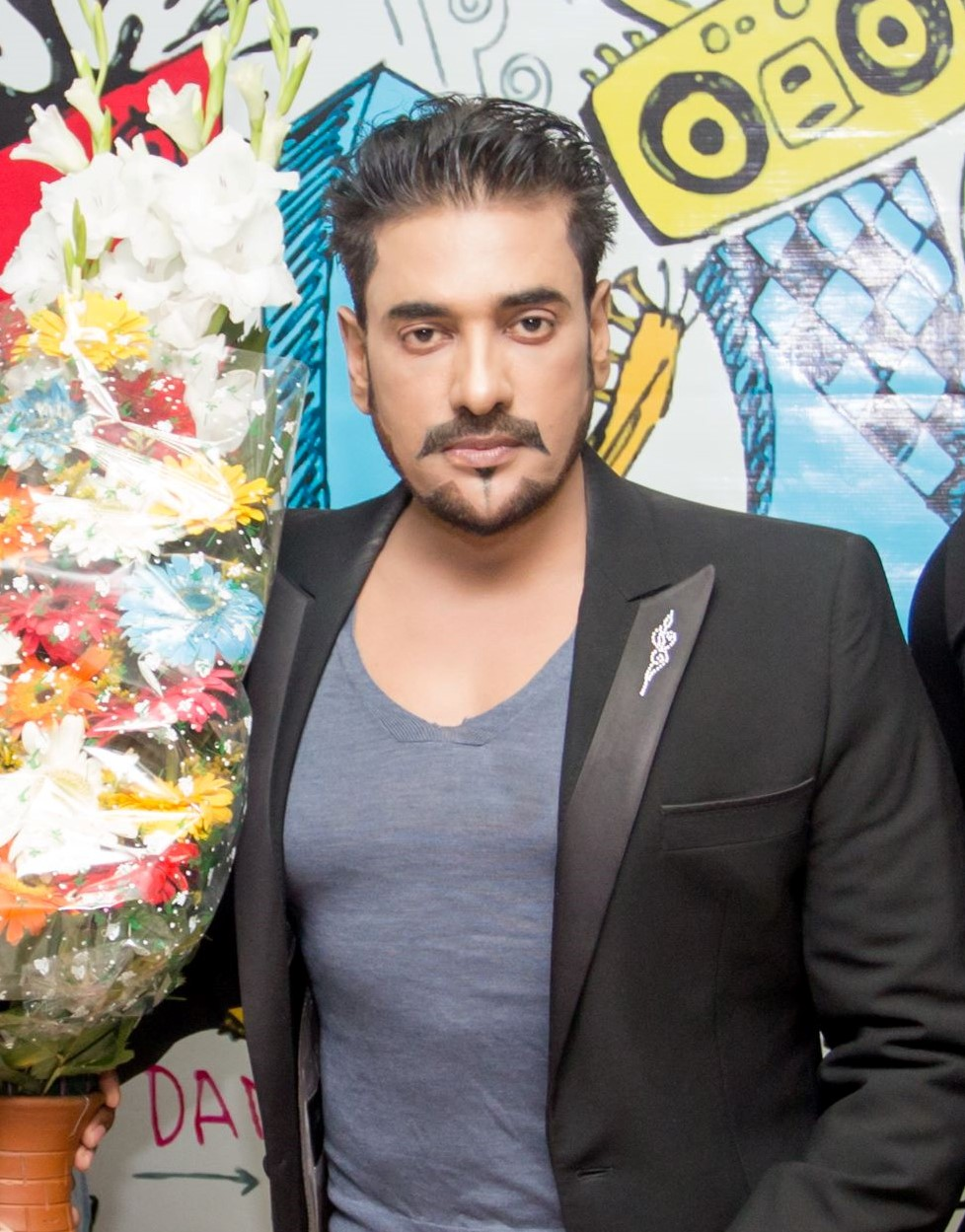
- Jalil in 2019
- Born: M. A. Jalil; 17 April 1978 (age 48); Munshiganj, Bangladesh
- Occupations: Actor; director; producer; businessman
- Years active: 2009–present
- Spouse: Afiea Nusrat Barsha (m. 2011)

M. A. Jalil (known as AJ) is a Bangladeshi businessman, actor, director and producer. He is known for his contributions to Bangladesh's textile industry, as well as his performance in Khoj: The Search.

== Early life and education ==
Ananta Jalil was born on April 17, 1978, in Munshiganj, Bangladesh. When he was 5 years old, his mother died. He was raised with his older brother by their father. He completed his O-levels and A-levels from Dhaka and received a Bachelor of Business Administration (BBA) from Manchester University in the UK.

== Career ==
In 1996, his 14 years elder brother set up a small apparel unit in Mirpur. It had a workforce of 400 and used to make shirts for European buyers. In 2001, Ananta began working as a production general manager in this company. Later, this small garment factory eventually grew into AJI Group.

He was recognized by the Bangladesh government in 2014 as a CIP (Commercially Important Person) for his contributions to the Ready-Made Garment sector.

Ananta made his debut as an actor and producer with the 2010 film Khoj: The Search. The film headlined the debut of Ananta and Barsha, Bobby. Khoj: The Search was followed by Hridoy Bhanga Dheu in 2011.

In 2012, he appeared in two films, The Speed and Most Welcome. Both films were a comedic success and gave him access to the local crowd of Bangladeshi cinema. In The Speed, Ananta starred opposite to two foreign actresses, Malaysian actress Parveen and Russian actress Nana. The 2nd release Most Welcome was released on Eid.

In 2013, his only release was Nishwartha Bhalobasa. The film marked the directorial debut of Ananta and premiered at the 66th annual Cannes Film Festival. In 2014 Most Welcome 2 was released, the sequel of his 2012 film Most Welcome. Producer and actor Ananta Jalil's Din–The Day helmed by Iranian director Morteza Atashzamzam, was released on Eid al-Adha, July 10, 2022.

Ananta is the brand ambassador of Grameenphone, a telecommunications service provider in Bangladesh.

== Personal life ==
Ananta married model-turned-actress Afiea Nusrat Barsha on September 23, 2011. Barsha is the managing director of Monsoon Films, founded and owned by Ananta Jalil. In early 2013, Ananta and Barsha started divorce proceedings after Ananta claimed he caught Barsha having affairs with several men and claimed to have proof. Barsha sued Ananta for compensation for allegedly beating her. They later reconciled. Together they have two sons, Ariz Ibn Jalil and Abrar Ibn Jalil.

Ananta has another son, Rafid Ibne Jalil, who is from his private family.

His elder brother died in 2008 in a car accident.

In November 2026, Mutual Trust Bank Managing Director and CEO Syed Mahbubur Rahman revealed that Ananta Jalil owes the Mutual Trust Bank Tk 400 crore in loan debt that he failed to pay back.

== Filmography ==
Key
†	Denotes films that have not yet been released

Year	Title	Role	Notes	Ref.
2010	Khoj: The Search	Major Mahmud / Ananta	Debut film	
2011	Hridoy Bhanga Dheu	Ananta		
2012	The Speed	Anonno		
2012	Most Welcome	Police officer (Aariyan)		
2013	Nishwartha Bhalobasa	Ananta		
2014	Most Welcome 2	Police officer (Aariyan)		
2022	Din–The Day	Ananta Jalil (AJ)	Iran-Bangladesh joint production film	
2023	Kill Him	Salman / Prince		
TBA	Netri: The Leader †	TBA	Filming	
TBA	Operation Jackpot †	TBA	Filming	

== Awards and nominations ==
List of awards and nominations
Year	Awards	Category	Film	Result	Ref.
2012	Meril Prothom Alo Awards	Best Actor	Most Welcome	Nominated	
2012	CJFB Performance Award 2014	Best Actor	Most Welcome	Won	
2013	Bioscope Borsho-sera	Best Actor	Nishwartha Bhalobasa	Won	
2013	Bioscope Borsho-sera	Best Couple (with Afiea Nusrat Barsha)	Nishwartha Bhalobasa	Won	
2013	Meril Prothom Alo Awards (popular)	Best Actor	Nishwartha Bhalobasa	Nominated	
