= Itihas (2002 film) =

Bangladeshi film

- Itihas Movie Poster
- Directed by: Kazi Hayat
- Written by: Kazi Hayat
- Screenplay by: Kazi Hayat
- Story by: Kazi Hayat
- Produced by: Kazi Hayat
- Starring: Kazi Maruf; Ratna; Moushumi; Kazi Hayat; Dipjol; Mizu Ahmed
- Cinematography: Azmal Hoque
- Edited by: Mohammad Ali
- Music by: Ahmed Imtiaz Bulbul; Rajib Alam; Taamer Al Tanveer
- Production company: Kazi Hayat Films
- Distributed by: Kazi Hayat Films
- Release date: 14 February 2002
- Running time: 155 minutes
- Country: Bangladesh
- Language: Bengali

Itihas (English: The History) (Bengali: ইতিহাস) is a 2002 Bangladeshi film starring Kazi Maruf as the protagonist. He received a Bangladesh National Film Award for Best Actor for his performance in the film. It also stars Ratna, Moushumi and Kazi Hayat.

== Premise ==
A college boy is framed for drug dealing by a political leader and a corrupt cop. This incident uproots his normal, simple life and he starts walking on the path that he is accused of.

== Cast ==
- Kazi Maruf as Maruf
- Monwar Hossain Dipjol as Sobhan
- Ratna Kabir Sweety as Khushi
- Mizu Ahmed as Baba
- Mousumi as Mim
- Kazi Hayat as Journalist Ahad Chowdhury
- Kabila as Kabila
- Afzal Sharif as Advocate Sanaullah Patwari
- Dulari Chakraborty as Khushi's Mother
- Nazmul Hussain as OC Nazmul Hossain
- Shahi as Shahi
- Amir Hossain
- Nader Khan
- Kala Aziz as Aziz
- Nargis Akter Marjina

== Track listing ==
1. "Tumi Koi Tumi Koi" - Asif Akbar and Baby Naznin
2. "Prem Koreche Prithibite" - Asif Akbar and Baby Naznin
3. "Mone Jodi Pochon Dhore" - Momtaz

== Awards ==
Bangladesh National Film Awards

- Best Director - Kazi Hayat
- Best Actor - Kazi Maruf
- Best Editing - Mujibur Rahman Dulu
