= Dui Prithibi (2015 film) =

2015 film by FI Manik

- Poster
- Directed by: FI Manik
- Screenplay by: FI Manik
- Story by: Mohammad Rafiq Uz Zaman
- Produced by: Shondhani Kotha Chitra
- Starring: Shakib Khan; Apu Biswas; Ahona Rahman; Alamgir; Parveen Sultana Diti; Kazi Hayat; Misha Sawdagor
- Production company: Shondhani Kotha Chitra
- Distributed by: Shondhani Kotha Chitra
- Release date: 5 June 2015
- Country: Bangladesh
- Language: Bengali

Dui Prithibi (transl. Two Worlds) is a 2015 Bangladeshi romantic drama film. The film was screenplayed and directed by FI Manik. It was produced and distributed by Shondhani Kotha Chitra. It was written and dialogued by Mohammad Rafiquzzaman. The film features an ensemble cast including Shakib Khan, Apu Biswas and Ahona Rahman, Syed Hasan Imam, Alamgir, Abul Hayat, Kazi Hayat, Ali Raj, Parveen Sultana Diti, Dolly Johur, Rasheda Chowdhury, Mizu Ahmed, Sadek Bachchu, Misha Sawdagor, Shiba Shanu and Ilias Kobra. The film soundtrack was composed by Emon Saha.

== Cast ==
- Shakib Khan as Tonmoy
- Apu Biswas as Moina
- Ahona Rahman as Farah
- Syed Hasan Imam
- Alamgir
- Abul Hayat
- Kazi Hayat
- Ali Raj
- Parveen Sultana Diti as Ruma, Farah's mother
- Dolly Johur as Sadia, Tonmoy's mother
- Rasheda Chowdhury
- Mizu Ahmed
- Sadek Bachchu
- Misha Sawdagor as Haidar Khan
- Shiba Shanu as Abir
- Ilias Kobra

== Production ==
The film began in 2010 but stopped shooting in the middle. After about 5 years, the film work start again in 2015. The film was wrapped up with shot a song on May 12, 2015 in Bashundhara City, Dhaka.

== Marketing and release ==
The film official trailer revealed on May 27, 2015 on Tiger Media's YouTube channel.

=== Release ===
The film released on June 5, 2015 in 85 theatres all over country.
