= Most Welcome =

Bangladeshi action film

- Directed by: Anonno Mamun
- Produced by: Monsoon Films
- Starring: Ananta Jalil; Barsha; Bapparaj; Misha Sawdagor
- Music by: Adhyan Dhara, Hridoy Khan, Akhash sen
- Distributed by: Monsoon Films
- Release date: 20 August 2012
- Running time: 135 minutes
- Country: Bangladesh
- Language: Bengali

Most Welcome is a 2012 Bangladeshi action film directed by Anonno Mamun and produced by Ananta Jalil under his production banner Monsoon Films. The film features Ananta Jalil and Afiea Nusrat Barsha in lead roles.

== Cast ==
- Ananta Jalil as Ariyan
- Barsha as Adhora
- Nayok Raj Razzak
- Bapparaj police officer
- Ahmed Sharif
- Rex Jafor as Ahmed
- Sohel Rana
- Misha Sawdagor as Asif Khan
- Sneha Ullal as special appearance in title song

== Release ==
It had an Eid release in August, 2012 in Bangladesh. Most Welcome was also screened in the United Kingdom, where it opened in eight theatres. The international premiere was held on 10 March 2013 in Cineworld, Ilford.

=== Critical reception ===
Rifat Islam Esha, reviewing it for New Age, wrote, "Go watch the movie! It's worth it. Laugh if you like but it's the first time in Bangladesh that someone has incorporated such 'Pojukti' [technique] in films and I believe this will take our movie industry to the 'other' level very soon indeed."

=== Box office ===
Film website Twitch Film describes Most Welcome as the "biggest box office hit" of summer 2012.

== Soundtrack ==
Track listing
No.	Title	Singer(s)	Length
1.	"Most Welcome (Title Track)"	Mila & S I Tutul	4:46
2.	"Veja Veja Haowate"	Arfin Rumey & Nancy	5:40
3.	"Prem De Na Re"	Mila & Ahamed Tausif	4:39
4.	"Adhor Chuye"	Porshi & Kishor	4:30
5.	"Kotota Tomake Ami Bhalobashi"	Hridoy Khan & Nirjhor	4:40
6.	"Ke Kahar"	Kailash Kher	4:21
7.	"Most Welcome (Instrumental)"	Instrumental	4:19

== Sequel ==
- Most Welcome 2
