= Ahona Rahman =

Bangladeshi actress and model

- অহনা রহমান
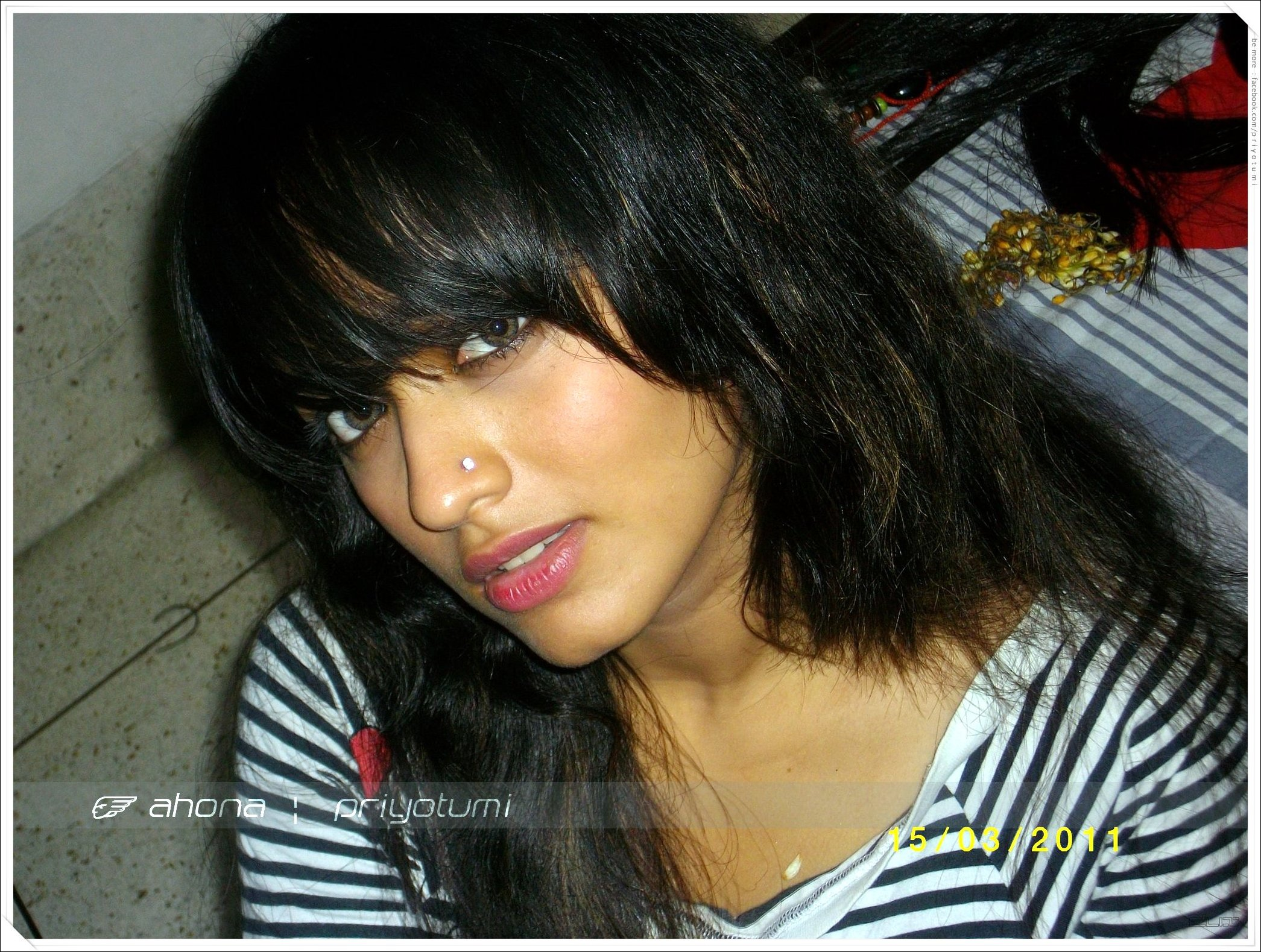
- Rahman in 2011
- Born: Ahona Rahman Lucky
- Occupations: Actress, model
- Years active: 2008–present
- Organisation: Ahona's Creation

Ahona Rahman (Bengali: অহনা রহমান, Bengali pronunciation: [ɔɦona rɔɦman]) is a Bangladeshi actress and model, who came to the media participating in the photo contest show Binodon Bichitra Photogenic Contest held in 1996. She also performed in Bengali films.

== Career ==
Rahman started her career with modeling then she made her debut in Bengali drama Choita Pagla. In 2008, she made her acting debut in the Bengali film industry with the film Chakorer Prem, with co-star Amin Khan. She also appeared in Dui Prithibi with co-actor Shakib Khan.

== Filmography ==
=== Television ===
- Amar Driver Bou
- America to Ashulia
- Amra Tinjon
- Analog Love Guru
- Ar Banabo Na Natok
- Argentine Girlfriend
- Ayna Ghor
- Amar Korean Boyfriend
- Baba
- Bhai Er Hobu Bou
- Bhalobashia Gelam Fasia
- Biborton
- Bisshase Milay Bostu
- Bou Hebbi Demandful
- Biyer Trouble
- Chele Amar Pochondo Na
- Choita Pagla
- Chini Jamai
- Comedy 420
- Crush Jokhon Trash
- Dokkhina Pobon
- Dui Takar Bahaduri
- Ek Poloke
- Ekdin Shopno Rongin
- Ghotok Boyfriend
- Girlfriend Jokhon Oggan
- Girlfriender Ma
- Going Bidesh
- Good Luck
- Gonda Girlfriend
- Gramer Girlfriend
- Hearte Du Du
- Husbander Biye
- It's A Fact
- Jamai Keno Chor
- Joiboti Koinya
- Kata Tarer Bera
- Khali Kolsi Baje Beshi
- Khela Hobe
- Khorom
- Korban Alir Korbani
- Loser
- Mala Tumi Kar
- Mamar Breaking News
- Mamar Hater Moa
- Manush
- Meet My Wife
- Mofizer Shundori Bou
- Mohaguru
- Mon Thekey Durey
- Nishi Rater Golpo
- Noashal
- Nojorbihin Nojor Ali
- Not Out
- O Amar Bondhu
- Obosheshe Natok Shesh Holo
- Obosheshe Natoke Porinoto Holo
- Onnorokom Eid
- Ontor Bibhrat
- Opekkha
- Otopor Ekti Khun
- Palki Bhromon
- Projapoti Mon
- Roser Hari
- Rupali Prantor
- Palabi Kothay
- Shagai
- Shanti Adhidaptar
- She Kotha Rakheni
- Shodor Ghater Tiger
- Shundor Ali
- Shoshur Bari Noakhali
- Shoshur Bari Noakhali 2
- Shottobadi Husband
- Talbaba
- Talak
- Three Comrades
- Third Eye
- Tin Tala Tin Chabi
- To To Company
- Unlimited Hasho
- X Ekhon Bhabi
- Yes Boss No Boss

=== Film ===
Year	Film	Role
2008	Chakorer Prem	
2009	Jolodussu Rokto Rohosso	
2015	Dui Prithibi	Farah
2016	Chokher Dekha	

=== Web series ===
Year	Title	Role
2020	Sadarghater Tiger	
