= Agnee (2014 film) =

- Directed by: Iftakar Chowdhury
- Written by: A J Babu
- Produced by: Abdul Aziz
- Starring: Mahiya Mahi; Arifin Shuvoo; Misha Sawdagor; Ali Raj
- Edited by: Md Suzon Abdullah
- Music by: Adit Ozbert
- Production company: Jaaz Multimedia
- Distributed by: Jaaz Multimedia
- Release date: 14 February 2014
- Country: Bangladesh
- Language: Bengali

Agnee (Bengali for 'fire') is a Bangladeshi action film directed by Iftakar Chowdhury and produced by Abdul Aziz under the banner of Jaaz Multimedia. It was the first installment in the Agnee film franchise. The film features Arifin Shuvoo and Mahiya Mahi in the lead roles and Misha Sawdagor as the main antagonist of the film.

Agnee was released on 14 February 2014 in Bangladesh. The film was a huge financial success as it eventually become one of the highest grossing Bangladeshi films of 2014. The sequel of the film titled Agnee 2 was released in 2015.

== Plot ==
The film is about Tanisha, a nine-year-old girl living in Dhaka. Her father works for the brutal mafia bosses Gulzar and Haydar. When he decides to leave the criminal underworld to give Tanisha a better life, Gulzar and Haydar kill him and his family to eliminate the threat he poses. As they are about to kill her, Tanisha stabs Gulzar and vows to kill them both one day before escaping. She grows up to become a stone-cold assassin. Having received training from her uncle, she carries out vigilante murders in the hope that they will lead her to her ultimate target. Fifteen years later, Tanisha is a 24-year-old assassin with a cold heart. Having been trained by her uncle, she has become embroiled in vigilante killings. Despite both killers now being under the protection of the Thai government and guarded by Dragon's (played by Arifin Putra) powerful group, Tanisha will stop at nothing to find their hiding place and avenge her family's deaths.

== Cast ==
- Mahiya Mahi as Tanisha
- Arifin Shuvoo as Shishir / Dragon
- Ali Raj as Gulzar
- Misha Sawdagor as Haidar
- Kabila as Mama
- Danny Sidak as Marshal
- Iftakar Chowdhury as Kamal Ali
- Don as Kibriya
- Shiba Shanu as Alamgir
- Puja Cherry as Young Tanisha
- Nil Ahmed as Gause
- Daisy as Daisy
- May as Sukhi

== Production ==
=== Development ===
During mid 2013, Jaaz Multimedia announced the project with Mahiya Mahi as the main lead and Iftakar Chowdhury as the director. It was later announced that Arifin Shuvoo will join the cast as the main male lead.

== Soundtrack ==
Agnee The Film

Soundtrack album
- Released: 2013 (Bangladesh)
- Recorded: 2013
- Genre: Films Sound Track
- Label: Jaaz Multimedia
- Producer: Jaaz Multimedia

The film's soundtrack is composed by Adit, Shafiq Tuhin, Ahmed Humayan and with lyrics penned by Ahmed Imtiaz Bulbul, Robiul Islam Jibon, Abdul Aziz and Sudip Kumar Dip.

Track	Song	Singer(s)	Duration (min:sec)
1	"Agnee" (Title Song)	Lihat Lemis	3:14
2	"Shudhu Tui Shunbi"	Shaan	4:37
3	"Tumi Dekho Shraboner Megh"	Labonno	2.50
4	"Shohena Jatona"	Arifin Shuvoo, Dilshad Nahar Kona	5.17
5	"Neshay Neshay"	Neeti Mohan	4:00
6	"Valobashi Toke"	Shaan	4:36

== Sequel ==
Director Iftakar Chowdhury has made a sequel, Agnee 2. The film released in 2015.
