= Agnee 2 =

- Theatrical Release Poster
- Directed by: Iftakar Chowdhury
- Produced by: Abdul Aziz
- Starring: Mahiya Mahi; Om Sahani; Ashish Vidyarthi; Amit Hasan
- Music by: Savvy; Akassh
- Production companies: Jaaz Multimedia; Eskay Movies (co-producer)
- Distributed by: Jaaz Multimedia (Worldwide); Eskay Movies (India)
- Release date: July 18, 2015
- Countries: Bangladesh; India
- Languages: Bengali; Chinese; Malay
- Box office: ৳39 million (equivalent to ৳71 million or US$580,000 in 2024)

Agnee 2 is a 2015 Indo-Bangladesh joint production action film directed by Iftakar Chowdhury. Produced by Abdul Aziz under the banner of Jaaz Multimedia and the film was co-produced by India's Eskay Movies. It is the second installment in the Agnee film franchise and serves as a sequel to Agnee (2014). The film stars Mahiya Mahi and Om Sahani in the lead roles. Mahi is the only actress from the previous film to appear in Agnee 2, with Om replacing Arifin Shuvoo.

After the initial success of Agnee (2014), production company Jaaz Multimedia announced a sequel. Although the film was originally planned with the cast of the previous film, the film stalled for a while due to lead actor Arifin Shuvoo pulling out of the film due to professional differences and scheduling issues. Director Iftakar Chowdhury later roped in Indian actors Ashish Vidyarthi, for the negative role, and Om, for the male lead. The film is produced by Abdul Aziz, his production company Jaaz Multimedia funded approximately 70% of the film's budget while Eskay Movies funded the rest.

The film was released on July 18, 2015, in Bangladesh during Eid weekend by Jaaz Multimedia and August 14, 2015, in India by Eskay Movies. Majority of the filming took place in Thailand.

== Plot ==
After defeating Gulzar and his gang to avenge her father's death, Tanisha returns to Bangladesh with Sishir to live a normal life again. Sishir, Tanisha's boyfriend, once a deadly assassin and a member of Gulzar's crime syndicate, later helps Tanisha. He decides to permanently return to Bangladesh for Tanisha but fails to return as Python, Gulzar's brother and leader of a large crime syndicate, kills him to take revenge for his brother's death. Saddened by the death of Sishir, Tanisha vows to kill Python, even at the cost of her own life, however, Python's real identity is hidden from the outside world, therefore, she doesn't know who or where he is. Tanisha decides to trace Python's location by tracking the movements and activities from other infamous criminals. Tanisha traces python's location to Thailand.

Tanisha comes across a criminal Eshan, whose identity is concealed from her, however he knows her and her intention behind coming to Thailand. Eshan is a member of Python's crime organization. As he spends more time with her, Eshan falls in love with Tanisha while she is looking to kill him. Expecting nothing in return, Eshan vows to help Tanisha take revenge on Python and also decides to turn himself in afterwards. Still in love with her late lover, who she once decided to spend her life with, will Tanisha accept Eshan's love, or will she take revenge for the death of Sishir by killing Eshan, who Tanisha believes is involved in death of Sishir? Or is it someone else?

== Cast ==
- Mahiya Mahi as Tanisha aka Agnee
- Om Sahani as Ishan
- Ashish Vidyarthi as Golden Triangle King Nilkantha Nag aka Python
- Amit Hasan as Interpol officer Mithun Sarkar
- Kharaj Mukherjee as Ganesh Da
- Kaushik Banerjee as Tanisha's father
- Supriyo Dutta as Lingesan, South Indian arms dealer
- Raja Dutta
- Arifin Shuvoo as Shishir/Dragon (Archive Footage from Agnee)
- Tiger Robi as Kalam Chowdhury, Arms dealer in India, Bangladesh, and Myanmar borders

== Production ==
After initial success of Agnee, production company Jaaz Multimedia immediately announced the sequel and retained the same leading cast. However, actor Arifin Shuvoo dropped out of the project shortly after due to scheduling and personal differences with the management. The principal photography for the film began in January 2015 and Om was signed to play the male lead while Tiger Robi and Ashish Vidyarthi were signed for the negative roles. Only Mahiya Mahi reprises her role from the first film with almost the entire cast of Agnee being replaced in the sequel. The film's first lot of shooting began in Thailand and lasted until April. Rest of the film was shot in Bangladesh while several shoots also took place in India.

== Soundtrack ==
The film's soundtrack was very well received by the audience. The album received critical and commercial success.

The soundtrack album consists of five tracks. The film's first track titled "Magic Mamoni" was first released on Jaaz Multimedia's official YouTube channel on 4 June 2015. The track was seen more than a million times on YouTube in the first week, becoming the fastest Bangladeshi film to cross a million views on the platform. The track was composed by Savvy and sung by Neha Kakkar. The film's second track "Ek Khan Chumu" was released online on 11 June 2015. The track was sung by Benny Dayal. Another track titled "Allah Jaane" was released on 18 June 2015, while the romantic track "Tore Khuji" was released on 12 July 2015.

=== Track listing ===
No.	Title	Lyrics	Music	Singer(s)	Length
1.	"Magic Mamoni"	Riddhi	Savvy	Neha Kakkar	3:00
2.	"Akk Khan Chumu"	Priyo Chatterjee	Akassh	Benny Dayal	3:52
3.	"Allah jane"	Priyo Chatterjee	Akaash	Nakash Aziz, Lemis	3:48
4.	"Baanjara"	Priyo Chatterjee	Akaash	Mohammad Irfan	4:12
5.	"Tore Khuji"	Akassh, Tuhin, Rajdeep	Akaash	Akaash	3:52
Total length:					18:44

== Release ==
Agnee 2 was released in 104 theaters screens in Bangladesh on Eid al-Fitr, 18 July 2015. The film was distributed in Bangladesh under the banner of Jaaz Multimedia. The film was also scheduled to release in India on the same day, however the release date was later postponed to 14 August 2015. The film was released in West Bengal, India in 45 theaters by Eskay Movies. The film was released in Australia on 23 August 2015.

== Reception ==
The Daily Star gave the film 2.5 out of 5 stars. The reviewer praised the action and dance sequences, but was critical of the lack of depth in the storyline.

== Sequel ==
During the release of Agnee 2, Director Iftakar Chowdhury officially announced the third installation titled Agnee 3. The film will retain Mahiya Mahi in the lead role.

== See also ==
- List of Bangladeshi film series
- List of Indian film series
