= Beporowa =

2019 film directed by Raja Chanda

- Beporowa Film Poster
- Directed by: Raja Chanda
- Produced by: Abdul Aziz
- Starring: Ziaul Roshan; Eamin Haque Bobby; Kazi Hayat; Shahidul Alam Sachchu; Kamal; Rebeka Rouf; Nana Shah
- Music by: Dabbu; Musfiq Litu
- Production company: Jaaz Multimedia
- Distributed by: Jaaz Multimedia
- Release date: 11 August 2019
- Country: Bangladesh
- Language: Bengali

Beporowa is a 2019 Bangladeshi Bengali action comedy film directed by Raja Chanda. The film was produced by Jaaz Multimedia, and stars Bobby and Roshan.

Beporowa is a remake of the 2015 Telugu-language movie Bruce Lee: The Fighter.

== Cast ==
- Ziaul Roshan as Rubel
- Bobby as Kiron
- Kazi Hayat as Rubel's father
- Shahidul Alam Sachchu
- Rebeka Rouf as Rubel's mother
- Khaled Hossain Chowdhury Sujon
- Tariq Anam Khan
- Nana Shah as Inspector Akbar
- Nima Rahman
- Sadek Bacchu
- Shiba Shanu
- Kamal Patekar
- Chikon Ali

== Production ==
When the film was announced in late August 2017, it was said that shooting would begin on 5 September in Dhaka, and would continue in Cox's Bazar, with an estimated 24-day shooting schedule. The film's songs were to be shot in India and Thailand. In August 2018, Channel i and The Daily Star reported that Beporowa had been filmed mostly at Ramoji Film City, Hyderabad, India the previous year, but that shooting for a song was continuing at Cox's Bazar. Lead actor Roshan recalls shooting in Hyderabad for 30 days. The Bangladesh Film Directors Association alleged that Beporowa had been filmed in India without permission from the Bangladesh government, making it a foreign film, and subject to import restrictions. Production company Jaaz Multimedia was forced to document that they had government consent to shoot it abroad.

== Release ==
Jaaz Multimedia promoted an August 2018 release for the Eid al-Adha holiday, but the film was yanked at the last minute. The Daily Star wrote that it was postponed because it didn't receive clearance from the Bangladesh Film Censor Board until the day before Eid. In April 2019, it was announced that it would be released in June for the Eid al-Fitr holiday. That plan fell through in May. Jaaz Multimedia CEO Alimullah Khokon attributed the further delay to the company's commitment to distribute another film, Nolok, which also stars Bobby.

Finally Beporowa was released on 11 August 2019. The general manager of Jaaz Multimedia said most major cinemas chose to show competing film Moner Moto Manush Pailam Naa, with big name star Shakib Khan, instead of Beporowa. Box office receipts were poor, which one theater manager attributed in part to the 2019 dengue outbreak in Bangladesh keeping cinemagoers away. Despite these headwinds, Beporowa entered the second week of its release playing in over 50 cinemas. Ridwan Intisaar Mahbub of The Daily Star wrote that, "Fans seemed to have loved the chemistry" between Rohan and Bobby.

== Soundtrack ==
Beporowa

Soundtrack album by Dabbu Musfiq Litu
- Released: 2019
- Recorded: 2018
- Studio: Jaaz Multimedia
- Genre: Feature film soundtrack

Singles from Beporowa
- 1. "Beporowa Title Song" Released: 13 Aug 2018; 2. "Ghum Ghum Adore (ঘুম ঘুম আদরে)" Released: 11 Jul 2019; 3. "Khati Sona (খাঁটি সোনা)" Released: 19 Jul 2019; 4. "Tumi Bolle" Released: 25 Jul 2019

All music is composed by Dabbu, Musfiq Litu.

No.	Title	Lyrics	Music	Singer	Length
1.	"Beporowa Title Song"	Raja Chanda	Dabbu	Satrujit Dasgupta	3:39
2.	"Ghum Ghum Adore (ঘুম ঘুম আদরে)"	Raja Chanda	Dabbu	Kona	3:12
3.	"Khati Sona (খাঁটি সোনা)"	Raja Chanda	Dabbu	Shaan, Kona	3:13
4.	"Tumi Bolle"	Sudip Kumar Dip	Mushfiq Litu	Imran Mahmudul	3:14
