= Sohel Rana (actor) =

Bangladeshi film actor, director and producer

- সোহেল রানা
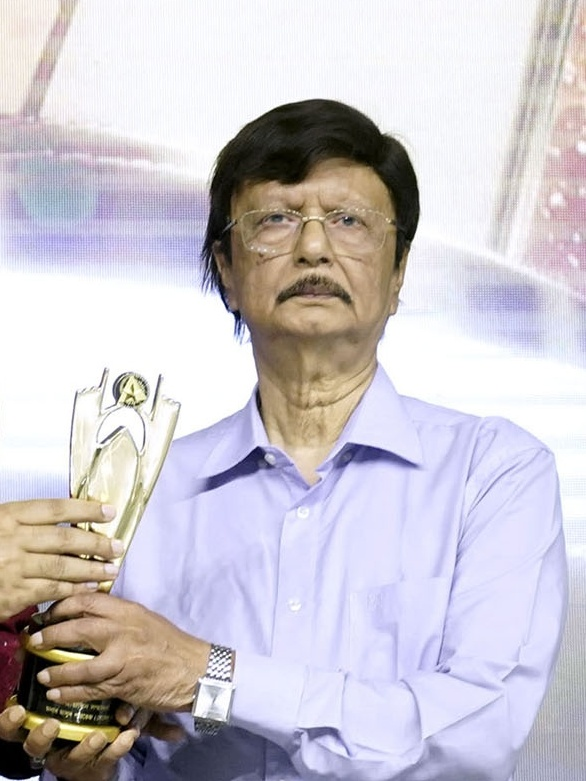
- Rana in May 2024
- Born: Masud Parvez; 21 February 1946 (age 80); Dhaka, Bengal Province, British India
- Education: University of Dhaka
- Occupations: Actor; director; producer; screen writer; politician
- Years active: 1972–present
- Organization: Parvez Films
- Spouse: Zeenat Begum (m. 1990)
- Relatives: Masum Parvez Rubel (brother); Tania Ahmed (niece)

Masud Parvez (born 21 February 1946) known by his stage name as Sohel Rana, is a Bangladeshi film actor, director, screen writer, politician and producer who predominantly worked in Dhallywood cinema. At present, he is a presidium member of the Jatiya Party. He won Bangladesh National Film Award for Best Actor for his role in the film Ajante (1996) and for the Best Supporting Actor award for the film Sahoshi Manush Chai (2003) and the Bangladesh National Film Award for Lifetime Achievement 2019.

Known for his witty dialogues in action films and other types of social characters, he was able to establish himself as one of main leading actors in the action scenes of the film industry. Starting his career with the film Ora Egaro Jon (1972), his successful career flourished with many hit films such as Epar Opar, Dost Dushmon, Jinzir, Gherao, Gaddar, Jobab, Badla, CID, Juboraj, Nag Purnima, Shahjada, Salim Javed, Badhon Hara, Ostad Sangred, Chor, Akheri Nishan, Prem Bodnam, Data Hatemtai, Gunaghar, Sokhi Tumi Kar & Dossu Bonhor. With a decade end to his career, he continued to be among the top action stars of the film industry and delivered many hits in the 1980s and early 1990s as well with films such as Al Helal, Ottachar, Jarka, Basona, Bojromusti, Tin Konna, Bir Purush, Bir Juddha, Shahi Kandan, Humki, Oborodh, Top Rongbaz, Lat Shaheb, Chokher Pani, Shotru Voyonkar, Josh, Commander, Opohoron, Ghorer Shotru, Shotru Shabdan & Mrittur Sathe Panja.

== Birth & Education ==
He was born on 21 February 1947 in Dhaka. His home is in Dehergati village, Babuganj Upazila, Barisal District. His father Auwal Malek and mother Dilowara. His younger brother is actor Masud Parvez Rubel.

He studied at Mymensingh Ananda Mohan College in 1961. He later completed a master's degree from University of Dhaka. He was involved in politics from his student life.

== Personal life ==
Rana married medical officer Zeenat Begum on 16 August 1990. Together they have a son Mashroor Parvez, a filmmaker.

== Career ==
=== Acting ===
Rana debuted producing films in 1972 with the film Ora Egaro Jon. He founded Parvez Films in 1983 which produced the first film, Masud Rana (1974). It was based on fictional spy series Masud Rana by Qazi Anwar Hussain.

Ahmed Zaman Chowdhury addressed him as Dashing Hero in 1974 and since then he has often been referred as such.

Rana acted in television drama plays including Abar Joddha Habo (2014).

=== Politics ===
While studying at Ananda Mohan College in Mymensingh, he was the president of the college Chhatra League unit, the student division of Awami League. In 1965, Rana held the position of General Secretary for the Greater Mymensingh unit. By 1966, he became the assistant general secretary of the East Pakistan Chhatra League and in 1968, he served as a member of its executive committee.

Following the independence of Bangladesh, Rana was elected the vice president of Iqbal Hall of the University of Dhaka in 1972.

In 2009, Rana joined the Jatiya Party (Ershad) and was appointed as the presidium member of the party. He was appointed adviser on election affairs to Hussain Mohammad Ershad, president of the Jatiya Party in 2012.

In October 2024, Rana launched his new political organisation titled "Bangladesh Justice Party" (Bangladesh Insaf Party in Bengali). The party committee would consist of 51 members. The official symbol would be a pigeon.

== Filmography ==
Year	Title	Role	Notes	Ref.
1974	Masud Rana	Masud Rana	Debut film; also as producer and director	
1975	Epar Opar	Mohammad Ali	Also as producer, director and screenwriter	
1976	Dossu Bonhur	Dossu Bonhur	Also as producer	
1976	Raj Rani	Raja		
1976	Gopon Kotha	Parvez		
1977	Adaalat	Montu		
1977	Maa	Masud		
1977	Dost Dushmon	Johnny		
1977	Data Hatem Tai	Hatem Tai	Based on the story of Hatim al-Tai	
1978	Gunahgar	Ali	Also as producer, director and story writer	
1978	Aguner Alo	Rana		
1978	Mintu Amar Naam	Mintu		
1978	Ashami Haajir	Police Officer		
1979	Jinjir	Mohon / Bandit Shamsher		
1979	Jobab	Khaled	Also as producer, director and screenwriter	
1979	Barud	Johnny		
1979	Badla	Rana		
1980	Be Deen	Kamran		
1980	Akheri Nishan	Nasir Bin Mahmud Shah		
1980	Hoor-e-Arab	Rana		
1980	Ovijog	Selim		
1980	Jadu Nagar	Aladdin	Also as producer, director and screenwriter	
1980	Anarkali	Mongol Khan		
1981	Aladin Alibaba Sinbad	Sinbad		
1981	Pardeshi	Bijoy		
1981	Selim Javed	Selim		
1981	Badhon Hara	Nurul Huda		
1981	Ostad Shagred	Heera		
1981	Jibon Nouka	Masum	Also as producer, story writer, director and screenwriter	
1981	Kalmilata	Major Ziaur Rahman		
1982	Ali Asma	Ali		
1982	Juboraaj	Sohel	Also as producer	
1982	Moharaja	Raja		
1982	Al Helal	Yousuf		
1982	Nat Bou	Himself	Special appearance	
1983	Lalu Bhulu	Lalu	Won — Bangladesh National Film Award for Best Actor	
1996	Ajante	Asad	Won — Bangladesh National Film Award for Best Actor	
1997	Hangor Nodi Grenade	Gofur Mia		
2003	Sahoshi Manush Chai	Principal Ibrahim Parvez	Won — Bangladesh National Film Award for Best Supporting Actor	
2005	Taka	Raihan Chowdhury		
2010	Khoj: The Search	Chief of Command		
2012	Most Welcome			
2012	Chorabali	Haider Khan		
2012	Buk Fatey To Mukh Foteyna	Sharif Chowdhury		
2013	Judge Barrister Police Commissioner	DMP Rahat Khan		
2013	Tobou Bhalobashi	Rashid Chowdhury		
2013	Purnodoirgho Prem Kahini	Himself	Special appearance as a narrator	
2014	Most Welcome 2	Scientist Hasan Moin Khan		
2015	Aro Bhalobashbo Tomay	Masud Parvez		
2017	Innocent Love	Pori's father		
2017	Raian	Godfather	Also as producer	

=== Other credits ===
Year	Title	Director	Producer	Notes	Ref.
1972	Ora Egaro Jon	No	Yes	Debut as a producer	
1974	Masud Rana	Yes	Yes		
1975	Epar Opar	Yes	Yes	Also screenwriter	
1976	Dossu Bonhur	No	Yes		
1978	Gunahgar	Yes	Yes	Also story writer	
1979	Jobab	Yes	Yes	Also screenwriter	
1980	Jadu Nagar	Yes	Yes	Also screenwriter	
1981	Jibon Nouka	Yes	Yes	Also story writer and screenwriter	
1982	Juboraj	No	Yes		
1989	Bojro Mushti	No	Yes		
2014	Oddrisho Shotro	No	Yes		
2017	Raian	No	Yes		
