= Mao Xinyu =

Grandson of Mao Zedong

Major General Mao Xinyu
- 毛新宇
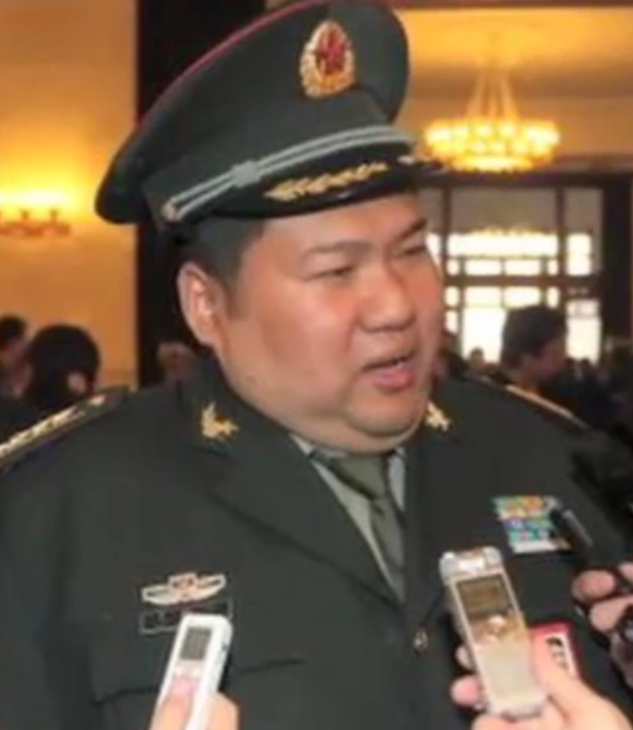
- Mao in 2015

Personal details
- Born: 17 January 1970 (age 56) People's Liberation Army General Hospital, Beijing, People's Republic of China
- Party: Chinese Communist Party
- Spouses: Hao Mingli (郝明莉) (m. 1997; divorce. 2003) Liu Bin (刘滨) (m. 2003)
- Children: 2
- Parent(s): Mao Anqing; Shao Hua
- Relatives: Mao family
- Education: Renmin University of China; Central Party School of the Chinese Communist Party; People's Liberation Army Academy of Military Sciences
- Profession: Historian, author, military officer

Military service
- Allegiance: China
- Branch/service: People's Liberation Army Ground Force
- Rank: Major General (Shaojiang, 少将)

Mao Xinyu
- Chinese: 毛新宇
Transcriptions
Standard Mandarin
- Hanyu Pinyin: Máo Xīnyǔ

Mao Xinyu (born 17 January 1970) is a grandson of Mao Zedong and a major general in the People's Liberation Army (PLA) of the People's Republic of China.

== Early life and education ==
Mao was born on 17 January 1970 at People's Liberation Army General Hospital in Beijing. He is the only child of Mao Anqing and Shao Hua and one of Mao Zedong's twelve grandchildren. He spent the first 11 years of his life away from his parents, who were based in Russia. He graduated from the History Department of Renmin University of China in 1992. He is a researcher at the People's Liberation Army Academy of Military Sciences, where he completed his doctorate.

== Career ==
Mao has written several books, including Grandfather Mao Zedong, published by the National Defence University Press in October 2003.

In June 2009, Mao was promoted to major general. According to the Changjiang Daily, he was the PLA's youngest general. Some critics attributed the promotion to nepotism. "To have such an unqualified person become a general in China's military, it's an insult to the People's Liberation Army," said Pu Zhiqiang, a lawyer and human rights activist. By contrast, Bao Goujin, a spokesman for the Academy of Military Sciences, said "he is a natural elevation. Mao's many achievements earned him the right to be promoted." According to Mao, family was "definitely" a factor and "an objective fact" but he also stated that expectations on Mao family members were stricter.

Mao is also a member of the National Committee of the Chinese People's Political Consultative Conference, an advisory group to the central government.

In September 2011, Mao began teaching Mao Zedong Thought at Guangzhou University Sontan College.

== Family ==
Mao was born to Shao Hua (邵华) and Mao Anqing, the son of Mao Zedong and Yang Kaihui.

Mao married Hao Mingli (郝明莉), a waitress, on 7 December 1997. They divorced after four years of marriage. His second wife is Liu Bin (刘滨), an air hostess, whom he met in 2000; they have a son, Mao Dongdong (毛东东, born 2003), and a daughter, Mao Tianyi (毛甜懿, born 2008).

In 2013, he stated that "Many people have been put on an altar, including my grandfather.... But now, only by transforming them back into real people can they be understood and accepted by the public, who will then want to learn from them."
