= Most Welcome 2 =

- Directed by: Ananta Jalil
- Produced by: Monsoon Films; Ananta Jalil
- Starring: Ananta; Barsha
- Music by: Akassh
- Distributed by: Monsoon Films
- Release date: 29 July 2014
- Country: Bangladesh
- Language: Bengali

Most Welcome 2 is a Bangladeshi 2014 action film written and directed by Ananta Jalil. Development began in February 2012. The film is a sequel of 2012 blockbuster Most Welcome. The film was released in 2014. The film stars Ananta Jalil and Barsha in leading roles.

== Cast ==
- Ananta Jalil as Police Officer Aryan
- Afiea Nusrat Barsha as Adhora
- Champa as Adhora's Mother
- Sohel Rana as Bangladeshi Scientist Hasan Moin Khan
- Misha Sawdagor as Misha, Main Antagonist
- Parveen Sultana Diti as Police Officer Aryan's Mother
- Puja Cherry Roy as Police Officer Aryan's Sister
- Hamim Rahman Deep as Deep
- Kabila as Jafor

== Production ==
Following the success of the previous installments, producers planned to develop a second sequel to the franchise, with Ananta Jalil playing the protagonist again. The shooting of the film started on 9 February 2013.

== Release ==
Most Welcome 2 released only in 19 theaters in Dhaka, but after second week it was released in 62 screens nationwide. It had also a limited release in Japan and UK.

== Soundtrack ==
Track listing
No.	Title	Music	Singer(s)	Length
1.	"Chicken Tandoori"	Akassh	Akassh
2.	"Tor Jaadu"	Akassh	Akassh & Amrita
3.	"Manush"	Akassh	Kailash Kher
4.	"Haowa Hoye Chuye Chuye"	Emon Saha	Bappa Mazumder & Naumi
5.	"Obak Prem"	Rafi	Syed Shahid & Shuvomita
6.	"Bolna Tor Kotha"	Tanvir Tareq	Tanvir Tareq & Somchonda

== See also ==
- List of Bangladeshi films of 2014
