= Khoj: The Search =

Khoj-The Search
- Khoj-The Search film commercial poster.
- Directed by: Iftakar Chowdhury
- Written by: Susmoy Sumon
- Produced by: M. A. Jalil Ananta
- Starring: Ananta; Bobby; Borsha; Nino – (Italy); Sohel Rana
- Cinematography: Iftakar Chowdhury
- Edited by: Iftakar Chowdhury
- Music by: Imon Shaha; Habib Wahid
- Distributed by: Monsoon Films
- Release date: 16 April 2010
- Country: Bangladesh
- Languages: Bengali; English

Khoj, The Search (Bengali: খোঁজ, দ্যা সার্চ) is a 2010 Bangladeshi Bengali romantic action film starring Ananta, Bobby, Afiea Nusrat Barsha and Sohel Rana.

== Plot ==
The film features Major Mahmud/Ananta (M A Jalil), a secret service agent working for Bangladesh Counter Intelligence (BCI), a fictional agency conceived in the Masud Rana series by Qazi Anwar Hussain. With the help of Captain Bobby, Major Mahmud thwarts the international arms syndicate headed by the notorious villain Nino.

== Cast ==
- M.A. Jalil Ananta as Major Mahmud / Ananta
- Bobby as Captain Bobby
- Afiea Nusrat Barsha as Elisa
- Nino – Arms smuggler
- Sohel Rana as Chief of Command
- Jisan as Pabel
- Dr.Ezazul Islam as Master
- Apu as 50/50
- Iftakar Chowdhury as Major Kamrul
- Jessica Hass as L.A. spy
- Mick Bosh as Las Vegas villain
- Raha as Nino's girlfriend
- Elias Kobra as martial arts villain
- Nino as arms smuggler Nino
- M. A. Jisan as maid of Jalil
- Lal Roni as Sajid

== Soundtrack ==
Khoj: The Search

Soundtrack album by Imon Saha and Habib Wahid

All music is composed by Imon Saha and Habib Wahid.

Songs
No.	Title	Playback	Length
1.	"Etodin Kothay Chile"	Habib Wahid
2.	"Tumi Phire Takale"	Bappa Majumdar
3.	"Angtir Apekshay"	Samina Chowdhury
4.	"I am Searching for My Love"	Ronti Das
5.	"Dinete Shurjo Bhalo"	Ferdous Wahid
6.	"Ki Chokhe Amay"	Kanak Chapa
7.	"Tumi Phire Takale"	Bappa Majumdar

== Reception and box office ==
Monsoon Films, a leading distributor in Dhaka, confirmed that the film opened across 44 cinemas all over Bangladesh. The movie was acclaimed for its overall picture quality and the use of elaborate visual effects in the action scenes. Before the release, the movie drew a huge amount of public attention by a massive promotional campaign in the national and international media. The trailer and pre-released item numbers went viral via Facebook and YouTube, and became the first internet meme in Bangladesh. The producer and lead actor, M A Jalil has announced that the film will be followed up with a sequel. Shahidul Islam Khokon, a commercially successful Dhallywood filmmaker, has been contracted for the next installment of the film The film became a hit due to the flaws in the film, which gave it an unintentional humor appeal, to the mostly young viewers.
