= Desh Premik =

Bangladeshi film

- Desh Premik Movie Poster
- Directed by: Kazi Hayat
- Screenplay by: Kazi Hayat
- Produced by: Sheikh Mujibur Rahman
- Starring: Alamgir; Manna; Champa; Dolly Jahur
- Music by: Azad Rahman; Ahmed Imtiaz Bulbul
- Release date: 1994
- Country: Bangladesh
- Language: Bengali

Desh Premik (Bengali: দেশপ্রেমিক, lit. 'Patriot') is a 1994 Bangladeshi film starring Manna and Champa opposite him. Director Kazi Hayat garnered Bangladesh National Film Award for Best Director. It also stars Alamgir.

== Track listing ==
1. "Momo Chittey" - Rezwana Chowdhury Banya
2. "Tumi Ki Dekhecho Kobhu" - Mahmudunnabi
3. "Sonkotero Bihbolotay" - N/A

== Awards ==
Bangladesh National Film Awards

- Best Film - Sheikh Mujibur Rahman
- Best Actor - Alamgir
- Best Director - Kazi Hayat
- Best Screenplay - Kazi Hayat
