= Nishwartha Bhalobasa =

Bangladeshi romantic action comedy film

- Official poster
- Directed by: Ananta Jalil
- Screenplay by: Chotku Ahmed; Ananta Jalil (dialogue)
- Produced by: Ananta Jalil
- Starring: Ananta Jalil; Barsha; Misha Sawdagar; Don; Kabila; Shaan; Nayak Raj Razzak; Suchorita
- Edited by: Akramul Hoque
- Music by: Kishore; Akassh; Shawkat Ali Emon; Emon Saha
- Production company: Monsoon Films
- Distributed by: Monsoon Films
- Release date: 8 August 2013
- Running time: 151 minutes
- Country: Bangladesh
- Language: Bengali

Nishwartha Bhalobasa (Bengali: নিঃস্বার্থ ভালোবাসা, lit. 'Selfless Love', English title What is Love?) is a Bangladeshi romantic-action-comedy film directed by Ananta Jalil, starring Ananta and Barsha in the lead roles. The film was produced by Ananta Jalil under the banner of Monsoon Films. Action hero Ananta made his debut as a director in this film. Nishwartha Bhalobasa was premiered at 66th annual Cannes Film Festival. The film was released on August 8, on Eid al-Fitr, 2013 in Bangladesh.

== Cast ==
- Ananta Jalil as Ananta
- Afiea Nusrat Barsha as Meghla
- Shaan as Rahul
- Dipesh K. Shrestha
- Don as Safakat
- Kabila as Jahir
- Nayak Raj Razzak as Hayder
- Suchorita as Meghla's Mother
- Misha Sawdagar as Bashir Khan
- Siraj Haider

== Plot ==
Meghla (Afiea Nusrat Barsha) is an aspiring media star. But her fate always takes her back to the ground whenever she is riding the stairs of touching the sky. The busy businessman Ananta (Ananta Jalil) falls in love with Meghla. He also has authority over the commercial film industry and a hero. In her childhood Meghla belong to a lower-class family. Her father used to bring cheap vegetables for them. her mother refuses to eat vegetables every day thus their family starts to fall apart. Meghla tries to save her family and requests earnestly to her father "I will eat those vegetables, please don't beat my mother". They continue to live their life like that. in lower-class family where food is very scarce beating wife is a common phenomenon in our country.

At this point, her grandfather Hayder (Razzak) appears. He builds up Meghla with morality and ethics.on the other side. After his death Meghla had to earn and feed her family so she became obsessed about being a model. The busy businessman Ananta falls in love with Meghla. He also has authority over the commercial film industry and was a renowned star at that time. Meghla gets Ananta's phone number when she reached his office and told her sad story. He then gives Meghla a key of car for her transportation. even agrees to become a model with Meghla. staying beside people in their need is the ultimate vow that Ananta has taken. Where humanity is doomed, Ananta always spreads his hand full of love there. He gives Meghla an apartment. And she arranges lunch one day. Feeding Ananta with her hand they become lovers easily.

In her becoming a model, Meghla ditches Ananta and starts to date another man. She got drunk one day and Ananta saved her. Ananta forgives her for her misconduct. Due to excessive greed for success Meghla falls into the trap of Bashir Khan (Misha Sawdagor). She cheats Ananta again. Meghla is portrayed as a very non-empathic person who only loves herself and she cheats Ananta again and again for fake fame and avarice. Even when Ananta was in the hospital she completely forgot about him and kept cheating on him. We have seen Meghla suffered a lot in her childhood. She had nothing of her own, for a long time of hardship she wanted to do something on her own but with the wrong motivation. She cannot commit to Ananta, violated the sanctity of his commitment, partnership, and love, disrespected him in front of another guy to tell him lie that she is not in any relationship with him. Meghla broke his trust, yet Ananta gave her all his property and left home. Here in the film Meghla is shown as a very evil fated woman maybe because the film was made by a man. What happened inside her mind and she was not satisfied after having everything in life seems to be very surprising. She is portrayed in a very negative way and the male protagonist seems to be a saint which is an imbalanced characterization.

Ananta decided to commit suicide at that time. Just before he jumped down, his phone rang. A terrific fight took place between him and the villain gang, Ananta gets injured immensely. He was shot many times. A few shots after that- cars are stopped in the road, garments are closed down, so are the shops. precisely, the whole country is astounded. People from all over the country pray for Ananta. Their prayer gets accepted and finally, Ananta's life was saved. The doctor comes out and says "I have seen many miracles in life but this one is nothing alike to the others". The movie comes to an end and Ananta continues to love Meghla.

== Critical response ==
Aarony Zade of The Daily Star gave the film four-and-a-half marks out of ten. Her enthusiasm, she wrote, "disappeared 30 minutes in". She faulted the predictable and sexist story. She praised Kabila's comedic skills and his performance in the item song "Dance Baby Moyna", but said of the special effects, "I have seen better graphics work in 'Super Mario Bros'". All in all the film made her "wonder if I would go see any of his [Ananta Jalil's] movies again".

== See also ==
- Cinema of Bangladesh
