= Ratna Kabir Sweety =

Bangladeshi actress

- রত্না কবির সুইটি
- Education: Jagannath University; Dhaka University
- Occupations: Actress, film writer
- Known for: Ongko, Shedin Brishti, Mon Jekhane Hridoy
- Spouse: Sakib Ahmed Tuhin

Ratna Kabir Sweety is a Bangladeshi film actress who is known as Ratna Kabir in Dhallywood She was born in Bikrampur (Munshiganj). She acted in more than 50 films.

Starting her career with the film Itihas, she found her success as a supporting actress in films such as Pore Na Chokher Polok, Ek Takar Chele Koti Takar Meye, Mon Jekhane Hridoy Sekhane, Dhoka, & Sontan Amar Ohongkar. Some her notable performance as a lead actress include Moron Niye Khela, Ongko, Keno Valobaslam ,& Rokte Veja Bangladesh.

== Biography ==
Ratna's father M H Kabir is an engineer and her mother Husna Kabir is a journalist. She entered into the film arena of Bangladesh with Keno Valobaslam in 2002 where Ferdous Ahmed was her co-star. After that she acted in Itihas. Her last released film was Sedin Brishty Chhilo which was released in 2014.

Ratna completed BA from Jagannath University in Social Welfare and she completed MA from Dhaka University in Social Welfare too. She collected nomination form for reserved seats for women in Jatiyo Sangsad from Bangladesh Awami League in 2014.

== Selected filmography ==
- Keno Valobaslam
- Itihas
- Prio Shathi
- Moron Niye Khela
- Pore Na Chokher Polok
- Ki Jadu Korila
- Kaajer Maanush
- Mon Jekhane Hridoy Sekhane
- Ongko
- Noshto
- Mon Niye Lukochuri
- Koti Takar Meye Goriber Chhele
- Rokte Veja Bangladesh
- Pach Takar Ruti
- Dhoka
- Sontan Amar Ohongkar
- Sontaner Moto Sontan
- Time Machine
- Shedin Brishti Chilo
