= Iftakar Chowdhury =

Bangladeshi-American actor

- ইফতেখার চৌধুরী
- Education: College of Staten Island
- Occupations: Actor, director, and producer

Iftakar H Chowdhury, known as Iftakar Chowdhury is a Bangladeshi-American film actor, director and producer. He started his career as a director with Khoj: The Search. The film was released in 2010, and introduced new technologies in Dhallywood.

== Early life and education ==
Iftakar Chowdhury was born to Bangladeshi parents but emigrated to the United States, settling in New York City. He completed his secondary education from La Guardia High School, later graduating from the College of Staten Island.

== Career ==
He started his career with Khoj: The Search, which did well at the box office. His second movie was Dehorokkhi, starring Anisur Rahman Milon, Kazi Maruf, and Bobby, which was released in 2013. It was a success at the box office.

His third film, Agnee, released on 14 February 2014, became an all-time blockbuster. He has finished Bizli, Bangladesh's first super hero film shot in Iceland, Thailand, India and Bangladesh.

== Filmography ==
=== As director ===
| Year | Film | Cast | Language | Notes |
|---|---|---|---|---|
| 2010 | Khoj: The Search | Ananta Jalil, Barsha, Bobby | Bengali | Debut Film |
| 2013 | Dehorokkhi | Kazi Maruf, Bobby, Milon | Bengali | |
| 2014 | Agnee | Arifin Shuvoo, Mahiya Mahi | Bengali | |
| 2014 | Rajotto | Shakib Khan, Bobby | Bengali | |
| 2015 | Action Jasmine | Bobby, Symon Sadik | Bengali | |
| 2015 | Agnee 2 | Mahiya Mahi, Om | Bengali | Indo-Bangladesh joint production |
| 2016 | One Way | Bobby, Bappy Chowdhury, Milon | Bengali | |
| 2018 | Bizli | Bobby, Satabdi Roy, Raanveer | Bengali | |
| 2019 | Nolok | Shakib Khan, Bobby | Bengali | Uncredited Director |
| 2021 | Din–The Day | Ananta Jalil, Barsha | Bengali | Turkey Director |
| 2022 | Driver Web Series | Mosharraf Karim, Mahiya Mahi | Bengali | Bioscope App |
| 2025 | Mukti | Raj Ripa | Bengali | Post-Production |

=== As actor ===
| Year | Film | Role | Language | Notes |
|---|---|---|---|---|
| 2010 | Khoj: The Search | Anti Hero | Bengali | |
| 2013 | Dehorokkhi | Guest Appearance | Bengali | |
| 2014 | Agnee | Anti Hero | Bengali | |
| 2015 | One way | Side Villain | Bengali | |
| 2015 | Action Jasmine | Director | Bengali | |

== See also ==
- Cinema of Bangladesh
