= Bizli =

Bangladeshi superhero film

- Theatrical release poster
- Bengali: বিজলী
- Directed by: Iftakar Chowdhury
- Written by: Pele Bhattacharyya
- Produced by: Eamin Haque Bobby
- Starring: Bobby; Ranojoy Bishnu; Satabdi Roy
- Cinematography: Kamud Verma; Shailesh Av. Awasthhi
- Music by: Akassh; Savvy; Ahmmed Humayun; Shafiq Tuhin
- Production company: Bobstar Films
- Distributed by: Jaaz Multimedia; Bobstar Films (Bangladesh)
- Release date: 30 March 2018 (Bangladesh)
- Running time: 125 minutes
- Country: Bangladesh
- Language: Bengali

Bizli (Bengali: বিজলী, lit. 'lightning') is a 2018 Bangladeshi superhero film directed by Iftakar Chowdhury, and produced by Bobstar Films. It stars Bobby as the protagonist and Indian actress Satabdi Roy as the antagonist. The film was released at Janata Cinema Hall in Nilphamari on 30 March 2018, then released countrywide on 13 April 2018. It is the first superhero film in Bangladesh to possess an original script and story line.

== Cast ==
- Bobby as Bizli
- Ranojoy Bishnu as Rony
- Satabdi Roy as Dr. Jerina Hassan, Rony’s elder sister
- Ilias Kanchan as Dr. Alam
- Zahid Hasan as Sajjad
- Misha Sawdagor as Nadeem
- Dilara Zaman
- Anisur Rahman Milon
- Tiger Robi
- Shadin Khasru as Driver Habib

== Plot ==
Bizli is a high school student who was born on a stormy night. From birth, she has special powers that let her shoot lightning from her hands. At first, Bizli finds it hard to control this power. With care and advice from her guardian, Dr. Alam, she slowly learns how to use it.

Her enemy is Dr. Jerina, a cruel and dangerous scientist who wants to capture Bizli. Things get harder because Bizli’s boyfriend, Rony, is Dr. Jerina’s brother. This makes it easier for Jerina to track her down. Soon, Bizli and Dr. Jerina face each other in a big fight.

== Release ==
The first look of Bizli was revealed on 15 March 2018. The film was released in Sydney, Australia, on 8 July 2018, and was also released in Dublin, London, Luton, and Birmingham.
