= Din–The Day =

- Bengali: দিন: দ্য ডে
- Persian: روز
- Directed by: Morteza Atashzamzam
- Screenplay by: Chatku Ahmed
- Story by: Ananta Jalil
- Produced by: Ananta Jalil; Morteza Atashzamzam
- Starring: Ananta Jalil; Barsha; Misha Sawdagor
- Distributed by: Monsoon Films
- Release date: 10 July 2022
- Running time: 143 mins
- Countries: Bangladesh; Iran
- Languages: Bengali; English; Persian
- Box office: ৳2.36 crore (US$190,000)

Din–The Day is a 2022 Bangladeshi–Iranian joint produced action film directed by Morteza Atashzamzam and produced by Ananta Jalil under his production banner Monsoon Films. The film features Ananta Jalil and Afiea Nusrat Barsha in the lead roles.

== Synopsis ==
The story is of a Swat agent sent on a mission to destroy an international drug chain and terrorists.

== Cast ==
- Ananta Jalil as AJ The SWAT officer
- Barsha
- Sumon Farukh
- Misha Sawdagor as a Police commissioner
- Adem Arslan
- Saner Pakoglu
- Shafiullah Khan

== Production ==
In 2018, a production team from Iran made a documentary film about Rohingya genocide titled Buddha's Shame, directed by Morteza Atashzamzam. After watching Ananta's films, the Iranian ambassador to Bangladesh submitted a report about him to the Iranian government. He then put the production team in touch with Ananta Jalil. Then Jalil was invited to Iran by the Iranian government. On June 18, 2018, Ananta met with Alireza Tabesh of the Farabi Cinema Foundation to discuss the concept of the film. Ananta Jalil said he wanted to make a film that would highlight the real Islam. Alireza Tabesh then said that he was willing to produce the film but that the script of the film should be satisfactory to them.

In October 18 of the same year, a film related agreement was signed. It is known that Morteza Atashzamzam jointly produced the film with Monsoon Film. The shooting of the film started on 27 February 2019. Ananta Jalil was injured while shooting in Herat, in March, and the shooting was postponed for at least two weeks. Its shooting was postponed again in July 2020 due to the COVID-19 epidemic. Four months later, the shooting resumed on October 30. The shooting ended on 18 November. The film was shot on 8K camera. The production team used Dolby Atmos 7.1 surround sound technology. It has been shot in Bangladesh, Iran, Afghanistan, Turkey and Morocco.

== Marketing ==
The first trailer of the film was released on YouTube on March 15, 2020. The songs of the film were released on YouTube on March 4, 2022. The final official trailer of the film was uploaded on YouTube on June 21, 2022. Then, as part of marketing, Ananta Jalil and Barsha went to Teacher-Student Centre, University of Dhaka on June 24 to show another trailer to students.

== Music ==
Din–The Day

Soundtrack album by Imran Mahmudul, Anisha, Mohammad-Reza Hedayati, Khadiza Parvin Barsha, Belal Khan
- Released: 2022
- Recorded: 2019
- Genre: Film music
- Languages: Bengali; Persian

Din–The Day Soundtrack – Track listing
No.	Title	Lyrics	Singers	Length
1.	"Toke Rakhbo Khub Adore"	Snahasish Ghosh	Imran Mahmudul and Anisha	4:54
2.	"Borsha Chokhe"	Tareq Ananda	Imran Mahmudul	4:25
3.	"Shudhu Tomakei Chai"	Abdul Jabbar Kakayee	Mohammad-Reza Hedayati, Khadiza Parvin Barsha and Belal Khan	4:40

== Controversies ==
In August, Morteza Atashzamzam accused Ananta Jalil of violating the terms and conditions of the film. Ananta Jalil made the film in his own way without discussing with the director. As a result, the film has turned into a low-quality film, the director said. Morteza also requested Ananta to drop the names of Iranians from the list of names of the film's production team due to non-compliance with the terms of the contract, but Ananta refused the request. Morteza filed a case against Ananta in a court in Tehran, and said he would file a case in Bangladesh as well. Ananta rejected the director's statement. He termed his allegation as part of a conspiracy against him.

Ananta Jalil claimed that it was produced on an estimated budget of ৳100 crore, that makes it the most expensive Bangladeshi film at the time of its release. But later Morteza Atashzamzam, co-producer of the film, published the film related agreement via Instagram which states that its actual budget was ৳4 core. As per the contract, Ananta was supposed to pay the entire budget, but he paid only 4.8 percent of the total amount. After the release of the director's contract, when Entertainment reporter of Prothom Alo asked Ananta about this, he claimed that the contract was edited, but he refrained from giving any direct answer regarding the film's budget.

== Release ==
The film was initially slated for release in December 2019. Later, the owner of Monsoon Films had planned to release the film on Eid-ul-Azha in 2021. It is scheduled to be released in 80 countries. The release date of the film was later fixed for December 24, 2021, but it was postponed due to COVID-19 pandemic. On 5 June 2022, the film got censor certificate in Bangladesh. Din: The Day was announced to be released on Eid-ul-Azha 2022.

== Reception ==
The film mostly received negative reviews from audience. Actress Barsha said “Din: The Day' might be our last film” due to so much criticism and trolls over on social media. Columnist Ahsan Kabir of Bdnews24.com referred to the film as "a big budget trolled movie". He criticized Jalil and Barsha's poor acting and the story of the film as well as Ananta's wrongly spelled dialogue delivery in English. Called the film as "One of the greatest comedies of all time in Bengali Cinema", Jawad Saif from The Business Standard criticised it in his film review and referred to it a film with an unseen story. Columnist Asrar Chowdhury of The Daily Star thinks that the film was made like James Bond films but families can enjoy it unlike that film. Journalist Munni Saha praised the film in her article and compared its filmmaking with films of Tamil cinema. Misha Sawdagor, who plays the police commissioner in the film, said about the film that it did not contribute to the cinema of Bangladesh because the performers here are not professionals but amateurs.
