= Dehorokkhi =

Bangladeshi action film

- Directed by: Iftakar Chowdhury
- Written by: Abdullah Zahir Babu
- Produced by: Fatman Films
- Starring: Bobby; Anisur Rahman Milon; Kazi Maruf; Kazi Hayat; Prabir Mitra; Shiba Shanu; Shimul Khan
- Cinematography: Iftakar Chowdhury
- Edited by: Iftakar Chowdhury
- Music by: Adit
- Production company: Fatman Films
- Distributed by: Jaaz Multimedia
- Release date: 12 April 2013
- Running time: 127 minutes
- Country: Bangladesh
- Language: Bengali

Dehorokkhi (transl. Bodyguard) is a 2013 Bangladeshi action film directed by Iftakar Chowdhury. The film was produced by Fatman Films. Dehorokkhi is an action based romantic triangle film. The film features Bobby, Anisur Rahman Milon, Kazi Maruf, Shiba Shanu and Shimul Khan. The film marked 55 years of Bangladeshi film industry. Dehorokkhi was released on 50 screens. The movie created a buzz through its trailer in social networking sites. The music was distributed by G-Series.

== Plot ==
This is the story of Sohana, a bar dancer who is her family's breadwinner. Aslam, a man belonging to the underworld, falls in love with her but she rebuffs his advances. For Sohana's security, Aslam hires Tibro, a bodyguard, and the story takes a new turn.

== Cast ==
- Bobby as Sohana
- Anisur Rahman Milon as Aslam
- Kazi Maruf as Tibro
- Shiba Shanu as Sizar
- Kazi Hayat as Sohana's Father
- Prabir Mitra as Ramzan Chacha
- Shimul Khan as Kunta
- Ratan Khan

== Review ==
The film prompted old producers to return to producing film in the Bangladesh Film Development Corporation (BFDC). Iftakar Chowdhury, Bobby, Milon, Music Adit & Simul Khan became instant stars after the release of the film. The role of Anisur Rahman Milon was highly praised.

== Music ==
Dehorokkhi

Soundtrack album by Adit, Dola, Nancy, Kona, Shoeb and Parvez
- Released: 12-12-12
- Recorded: 2011
- Genre: Film Soundtrack
- Label: G Series
- Producer: Fatman Films

| No. | Title | Singer(s) | Length |
|---|---|---|---|
| 1. | "Sohana" | Dola | 5:35 |
| 2. | "Bhalobashi Tomay" | Nancy, Adit | 4:59 |
| 3. | "Maane Naa Mon" | Kona, Parvez | 4:27 |
| 4. | "Torey Khuji" (Soul) | Adit, Shoeb | 4:00 |
| 5. | "Jaadu" | Kona | 3:48 |
| 6. | "Torey Khuji" | Adit, Shoeb | 3:45 |
| 7. | "Bhalobashi Tomay" (Reprise) | Nancy, Adit | 4:37 |
