= Simin (film) =

2018 Iranian film by Morteza Atashzamzam

- Film poster
- Directed by: Morteza Atashzamzam
- Written by: Karim Ronasian, Khazar Mehranfar
- Produced by: Morteza Atashzamzam
- Starring: Mohammad-Reza Hedayati; Laleh Eskandari; Mohammad Fili; Sepeideh Mazaheri; Amir Abbas Rezaei
- Cinematography: Mohammad Fazlieh
- Edited by: Kavoos Aghaei
- Music by: Ali Asghr Rahimi
- Release date: 2018
- Country: Iran
- Language: Persian

Simin (Persian: سیمین ) is a 2018 Iranian film directed, produced and co-written by Morteza Atashzamzam. The other writers were Karim Ronasian and Khazar Mehranfar. The film starred Mohammad Reza Hedayati and Laleh Eskandari. Simin was selected as the opening film of the 31st International Festival of Children and Youth of Isfahan in 2018.

== Plot ==
After drying of the Zayandehrud River, the wells and aqueducts of neighboring villages have also run dry. The agricultural lands have lost their fertility and the villages have gradually emptied out. Most of their inhabitants have migrated to the nearby cities, leaving only the elderly in the countryside. But a few people who are more hopeful are still looking for water in the heart of the Qanats.

== Awards ==
Simin won the award for Best Narrative Feature Film at the 2021 Reading FilmFest in Reading, Pennsylvania.

== Cast ==
- Mohammad-Reza Hedayati
- Laleh Eskandari
- Mohammad Fili
- Sepeideh Mazaheri
- Amir Abbas Rezaei
