= Shi Min =

Shi Min may refer to:

- Ran Min (died 352), or Shi Min, military leader during the Sixteen Kingdoms period
- Simon Sze (born 1936), Chinese-American electrical engineer
- Shi Yihong (born 1972), born Shi Min, Peking opera performer
