= Karl Simin =

American scientist

Karl Simin (born 1967) is an American scientist and assistant professor of cancer biology working with microarrays to study gene expression in engineered mouse models to gain insight into the biology of human tumors.

== Early life ==
Karl was raised in the small town of Saline in south-eastern Michigan.

=== Education ===
- University of Michigan, Ann Arbor, Ann Arbor, MI, United States BS Anthropology-Zoology
- University of Utah School of Medicine, Salt Lake City, UT, United States
