= Kazi Hayat =

Bangladeshi actor and director

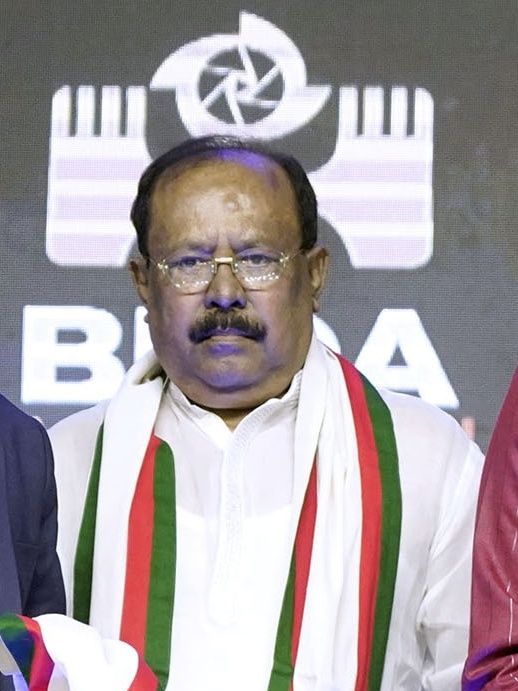
- Hayat in 2024
- Born: Hayat Ali Kazi; February 15, 1947 (age 79); Tarail, Gopalganj, Bengal
- Occupations: Film director, producer, actor
- Years active: 1974–present
- Family: Kazi Maruf (son)

Kazi Hayat (born 15 February 1947, although in a newspaper Hayat claimed that he was born on 13 April 1948) is a Bangladeshi film director, producer, writer, and actor. In 2023 he performed in Priyotoma, which was the highest grossing Bangladeshi film of all time upon its release, until another film surpassed it in 2024.

Hayat won Bangladesh National Film Awards eight times - Best Story for Dayi Ke (1987), Best Dialogue and Best Screenplay for Traas (1992), Best Story for Chandabaz (1993), Best Director and Best Screenplay for Desh Premik (1994), Best Cinematography for Ammajan (1999), and Best Director for Itihas (2002).

== Career ==
Hayat started his career as an assistant director in 1974. He debuted his directorial career with the film The Father (1979). In 2014, he released Shorbonasha Yabaa starring Kazi Maruf and Prosun Azad.

In 2020, he directed political action film Bir, which marked as the 50th directorial venture of him and first collaboration with Shakib Khan as a director. In 2023, he played Shakib Khan's father in Himel Ashraf's tragic romance Priyotoma, which became the highest grossing Bangladeshi film of all time.

== Personal life ==
Hayat's son Kazi Maruf is an actor.

In January 2022, Hayat was admitted to United Hospital's intensive care unit (ICU) due to myocardial infarction (MI).

== Filmography ==
=== Director ===
1. The Father (1979)
2. Dildar Ali (1980)
3. Khokon Shona (1982)
4. Rajbari (1984)
5. Mona Pagla (1984)
6. Pagli (1986)
7. Be-Raham (1985)
8. Dayi Ke? (1987)
9. Jontrona (1988)
10. Ain Adaalat (1989)
11. Danga (1991)
12. Traas (1992)
13. Chandabaz (1993)
14. Shipahi (1994)
15. Desh Premik (1994)
16. Love Story: Premer Golpo (1995)
17. Deshdrohi (1997)
18. Loot Toraz (1997)
19. Pagla Babul (1997)
20. Teji (1998)
21. Ammajan (1999)
22. Jobor Dokhol (1999)
23. Dhor (1999)
24. Jokhom (2000)
25. Kosto (2000)
26. Jhor (2000)
27. Dhawa (2000)
28. Bortoman (2000)
29. Krodh (2001)
30. Abbajan (2001)
31. Panja (2001)
32. Tandoblila (2001)
33. Itihas (2002)
34. Somaj Ke Bodle Dao (2002)
35. Minister (2003)
36. Ondhokar (2003)
37. Onno Manush (2004)
38. Kabuliwala (2006)
39. Captain Maruf (2007)
40. Moner Sathe Juddho (2007)
41. Sromik Neta (2009)
42. Oshanto Mon (2010)
43. Amar Shopno (2010)
44. Ora Amake Bhalo Hote Dilo Na (2010)
45. Pita Putrer Golpo (2011)
46. Manik Ratan Dui Bhai (2012)
47. Eve Teasing (2013)
48. Shorbonasha Yabaa (2014)
49. Chinnomul (2016)
50. Bir (2020)
51. Joy Bangla (2022)
52. Vranti (2022)
53. Green Card (2022)
54. Joggo Sontan (2023)†

=== Actor ===
- Itihas (2002)
- Kothin Simar (2003)
- Ondhokar (2003)
- Ajker Somaj (2004)
- Pitar Ason (2006)
- Saajghor (2007)
- Babar Kosom (2007)
- Neta (2007)
- Ulta Palta 69 (2007)
- Ekjon Songe Chilo (2007)
- Swami Strir Wada (2009)
- Banglar King Kong (2010)
- Bhalobaslei Ghor Bandha Jay Na (2010)
- Boroloker Dosh Din Goriber Ek Din (2010)
- Oshanto Mon (2010)
- Mayer Chokh (2010)
- Ora Amake Bhalo Hote Dilo Na (2010)
- King Khan (2011)
- Pita Putrer Golpo (2011)
- Boss Number One (2011)
- Tiger Number One (2011)
- Bondhu Tumi Shotru Tumi (2011)
- Raja Surjo Kha (2012)
- Buk Fatey To Mukh Foteyna (2012)
- Khodar Pore Ma (2012)
- Dehorokkhi (2013)
- Premik Number One (2013)
- Jotil Prem (2013)
- Prem Prem Paglami (2013)
- Romeo (2013)
- Love Station (2014)
- Tui Sudhu Amar (2014)
- Faand: The Trap (2014)
- Dui Prithibi
- Warning (2015)
- Baje Chele - The Loafer (2015)
- Epar Opar (2015)
- Chinnomul (2016)
- Apon Manush (2017)
- Rangbaz (2017)
- Mastan O Police (2017)
- Bhalo Theko (2018)
- Ami Neta Hobo (2018)
- Chittagainga Powa Noakhailla Maiya (2018)
- Beporowa (2019)
- Rukhe Darao (2024)
- Tal Matal (2024)
- Amar Sesh Kotha (2025)

=== Music video ===
Year	Song	Singer	Co-Artist	Director	Notes
2018	Jodi Hatta Dhoro	Imran Mahmudul, Bristy	Imran Mahmudul, Bristy, Khaleda Akter Kolpona	Saikat Reza	
