= Mizu Ahmed =

Bangladeshi actor and producer (1953–2017)

- মিজু আহমেদ
- Born: Mizanur Rahman; 17 November 1953; Kushtia, Khulna, East Bengal, Dominion of Pakistan
- Died: 27 March 2017 (aged 63); Dhaka, Bangladesh
- Occupations: Actor, producer
- Years active: 1978–2017
- Awards: Bangladesh National Film Award for Best Supporting Actor

Mizu Ahmed (17 November 1953 – 27 March 2017) was a Bangladeshi actor and producer. He is mostly known for his villain role in the Bengali film industry. He won Bangladesh National Film Award for Best Supporting Actor for his role in the film Traash (1992). In 1978, Ahmed made his film debut with the film Trishna. A couple of years later, he established himself as a villain in the Dhallywood film industry. He was also producing film from his own banner Friends Movies. In 2008 he was in the movie Baba Amar Baba.

== Early life ==
Ahmed was born on 17 November 1953 in Khustia, Khulna Division. His birth name is Mizanur Rahman. During his childhood, he was very interested in the theatre. In the following years, he became involved in the local drama theatre group.

== Career ==
Ahmed started his career in 1978, slowly built himself as a side actor in villainous characters in the film industry, known for his vicious and cruel-hearted demon-like roles in movies such as Sipahi, Strir Paona, Mayer Doa, Dhonoban, Nam Bodnam, Nagrani, Ney Juddho, and Surrender. In the 1990s, he finally became one of the top villains in the film industry with back to back successful performances in films such as Traash, Chadabaj, Atto Bisashah, Alo Amar Alo, Bachar Lorai, Bipod Songket, Chakor, Chokranto,Chadabaj, Atto Bisashah, Chaalbaaz, Baghini Konna, Ghayel, Bidrohi Charidike, Teji, Tag, Krodh, Shokter Vokto, Deshdrohi, Durdanto Dapot, Bipod Songket, Chorom Opoman, Tandob Lila, Sakkhi Proman, Tornado Kamal, Mohot, Golaguli, Ondho Bhalobasha, Amar Ma, Police Officer, Jhor, Love In Thailand, Time Nai, Nach Roposhi, Ashami Greftar, Amar Ma, Ei Mon Tomake Dilam, Coolie, and Lathi (1999).

He continued dominating the villainous roles after the 90's and finally became top villain as in new decade of 2000s with films such as Bhaiya, Sontrashi Munna, Ma Amar Behest, Piritir Agun Jole Degun, Ghorer Lokkhi, Shami Niye Juddho, Ondhokar, System, Tough Operation, Danger Seven, Khuni Chariman, Kathin Purush, Bipodjonok, City Rongbaz, O Sathi Re, Nisash Amar Tumi, Tension, Shokter Vokto, Jaal, Lalu Koshai, Sobai To Bhalobasha Chai, Ek Buk Bhalobasha, Ami Bacthe Chai, Biyer Logon, Dhawa, Tero Panda Ek Gunda, Jolonto Bishfomon, Banglar Hero, Killer,Jibon Manei Juddho, Majhir Chele Barrister, Humkir Mukhe, Juddhe Jabo, Ogni Ogni Konna, Rajdhanir Raja, Gurudeb, Kothin Protishodh, and Underworld.

== Death ==
At the age of 63, Ahmed died on 27 March 2017 due to cardiac arrest.

== Filmography ==
- Trishna (1978)
- Mahanagar (1981)
- Surrender (1987)
- Chakor (1992)
- Soleman Danga (1992)
- Tag (1993)
- Bashira (1996)
- Ajker Santrashi (1996)
- Hangor Nodi Grenade (1997)
- Coolie (1997)
- Lathi (1999)
- Lal Badsha (1999)
- Gunda No. One (2000)
- Jhar (2000)
- Kasto (2000)
- Oder Dhor (2002)
- Itihash (2002)
- Bhaiya (2002)
- Hingsha Protihingsha (2003)
- Big Boss (2003)
- Ajker Samaj (2004)
- Mahila Hostel (2004)
- Vando Ojha (2006)
- Badsha Bhai LLB (2007)
- Nishihdho Prem (2007)
- Machine Man (2007)
- Bullet (2007)
- Ami Baste Chai (2007)
- Rajhdhanir Raja (2008)
- Swami Niye Judya (2008)
- Mayer Swapno (2008)
- Baba Amar Baba (2008)
- Babar Jonno Juddho (2008)
- Boro Bhai Zindabad (2008)
- Thekao Andolon (2009)
- Kajer Manush (2009)
- Sobaito Bhalobasa Chay (2009)
- Biye Bari (2009)
- Jonmo Tomar Jonno (2009)
- Bhalobasha Dibi Kina Bol (2009)
- Bostir Chele Kotipoti (2010)
- Ek Jaban (2010)
- Rikshawalar Chele (2010)
- Amar Swapno Amar Sangshar (2010)
- Hay Prem Hay Bhalobasha (2010)
- Mayer Chokh (2010)
- Koti Takar Prem (2011)
- Asthro Charo Kalom Dharo (2011)
- Darowaner Chele (2011)
- Moner Jala (2011)
- Bangladeshi (2012)
- Sheulimani (2012)
- Shami vaggo (2012)
- Bhalobashar Rong (2012)
- Bajarer Coolie (2012)
- Manik Ratan Dui Bhai (2012)
- Eve-tesing (2013)
- Eito Bhalobasha (2013)
- Tabuo Bhalobashi (2013)
- Age Jadi Jantam Tui Habi Por (2014)
- Kothin Protishodh (2014)
- Nagar Mastan (2015)
- Action Jasmine (2015)
- Kartuj (2015)
- Dui Prithibi (2015)
- Bhalobasha Simahin (2015)
- Aral (2016)
- Ek Jabaner Jamidar Here Gelen Eibar (2016)
- Pure Jay Mon (2016)
- Ajante Bhalobasha (2016)
- Bossgiri (2016)
- Utola Mon (2016)
- Milon Shetu (2017)
- Bizli (2018)
- Matal (2018)
