= Kazi Maruf =

Bangladeshi actor

- কাজী মারুফ
- Born: 4 December 1983 (age 42); Gopalganj, Bangladesh
- Occupations: Actor, producer, singer
- Years active: 2002–present
- Father: Kazi Hayat

Kazi Maruf (born 4 December 1983) is a Bangladeshi film actor. He made his acting debut in the 2002 film Itihas, produced and directed by his father Kazi Hayat. Maruf won the Bangladesh National Film Awards for this film.

== Personal life ==
Maruf is the son of Bangladeshi renowned film director and producer Kazi Hayat who introduced him in the Dhallywood film industry.

Kazi Maruf and his wife live in New York, United States.

== Filmography ==
Key
†	Denotes films that have not yet been released

Year	Film	Role	Director	Notes
2002	Ithihas	Maruf	Kazi Hayat	Debut film
2003	Ondhokar	Maruf	Kazi Hayat	
2004	Onno Manush	Maruf	Kazi Hayat	
2007	Captain Maruf	Maruf	Kazi Hayat	
2008	Sromik Neta		Kazi Hayat	
2008	Goriber Chele Boro Loker Meye	Kashem	Ahmed Nasir	
2008	Aain Boro Na Sontan Boro		AJ Rana	
2009	Rastar Chele	Maruf	Shaheen Sumon	
2009	Panch Takar Prem	Ashik / Iqbal	Shaheen Sumon	
2010	Oshanto Mon	Maruf	Kazi Hayat	
2010	Amar Swapno	Maruf	Kazi Hayat	
2010	Maa Amar Jaan		Ahmed Nasir	
2010	Amar Maa Amar Ohongkar		Raju Chowdhury	
2010	Mayer Jonno Morte Pari		Ahmed Nasir	
2010	Boroloker Dosh Din Goriber Ek Din	Apon	Sheikh Nazrul Islam	
2010	Bostir Chele Kotipoti		Swapan Chowdhury	
2010	Ora Amake Valo Hote Dilo Na		Kazi Hayat	
2011	Mayer Jonno Pagol		Ahmed Nasir	
2011	Ostro Charo Kolom Dhoro		Raju Chowdhury	
2011	Wanted		Azad Khan	
2011	Bondhu Tumi Shotru Tumi	Maruf	Royal Babu	
2011	Darowaner Chele		Rokibul Alam Rakib	
2011	Ongko	Maruf	Shaheen Sumon	
2011	Chotto Songshar		Montazur Rahman Akbar	
2011	Pita Putrer Golpo	Maruf	Kazi Hayat	
2012	Maruf Er Challenge	Maruf	Shahadat Hossain Liton	
2012	Manik Ratan Dui Bhai	Ratan	Kazi Hayat	
2012	Raja Surjo Kha		Gazi Mahbub	
2013	Dehorokkhi	Tibro	Iftakar Chowdhury	
2013	Eve Teasing	Kashem	Kazi Hayat	
2015	Shorbonasha Yabaa	Maruf	Kazi Hayat	
2016	Mastani	Maruf	Firoz Khan Prince	
2016	Chinnomul	Kobir Kangal	Kazi Hayat	
2017	Mastan O Police	Maruf	Rakibul Alam Rakib	
2019	Garments Sromik Zindabad	Raja	Mostafizur Rahman Babu	
2021	Souvaggo	Shourav	F. I. Manik	
2022	Vranti	Maruf	Biplob Sharif	
2024	Green Card †	TBA	Kazi Hayat & Rowshan Ara Nipa	Also writer and director

Music video

Year	Song	Singer	Director	Co-Starring
2019	"Laal Sobuj" (Cricket Song)	Dinat Jahan Munni, Ayub Shahriar, Sabbir Zaman, Ahmad Humayun, Ronty Das, Tasnim Aurin, Arif & Masum	Ziauddin Alam	Mahiya Mahi, Eamin Haque Bobby, Dighi, Moushumi Hamid, Amin khan, Symon Sadik & Mamnun Hasan Emon
