= Bobby Haque =

Bangladeshi actress and film producer

- ববি হক
- Born: Eamin Haque Bobby; August 18, 1988 (age 37)
- Education: Business Administration (BBA)
- Alma mater: Eastern University
- Occupations: Actress, Producer, Model
- Years active: 2010–present
- Title: Miss Asia Pacific Bangladesh 2011

Eamin Haque Bobby, better known as Bobby Haque, is a Bangladeshi film actress, model and film producer. She made her acting debut in Khoj: The Search, released on 16 April 2010. Dehorokkhi (2013) helped her to be established as a star in the Dhallywood film industry.

== Film career ==
Bobby started her career as a model. She made her film debut in Bangladesh in 2010 in Khoj: The Search. She next appeared in Dehorokkhi, directed by Iftakar Chowdhury. Her next film was Full and Final, starring Shakib Khan. She appeared for the first time opposite Bappy Chowdhury in Inchi Inchi Prem. In August 2015, the movie Blackmail was released.

== Filmography ==
Key
†	Denotes films that have not yet been released

Year	Title	Role	Notes	Ref.
2010	Khoj: The Search	Captain Bobby	Debut film	
2013	Dehorokkhi	Sohana		
2013	Full and Final	Rimjhim		
2013	Inchi Inchi Prem	Megha		
2014	Rajotto	Rihanna		
2014	Hero: The Superstar	Bobby		
2014	I Don't Care	Kiron		
2014	Shopno Chowa	Shiana		
2015	Action Jasmine	Dipa / Jasmine		
2015	Aro Bhalobashbo Tomay	Herself	Special appearance	
2015	Blackmail	Arin		
2015	Rajababu: The Power	Sweety		
2016	One Way	Ivy		
2018	Bizli	Bizli		
2019	Nolok	Kajla		
2019	Beporowa	Kiron		
2022	Alpin	Newsr reporter Mili	Released on Rtv Plus	
2023	Paap	ACP Shaila		
2023	Briddhashram	Mili		
2024	Moyurakkhi	Tara		
2025	Khowab	Nishita	Released on Bongo BD	
2026	Tosnos	Nijhum / Nirasah	Dual role	
TBA	Nilima †	Nilima	Filming	

=== Television ===
Year	Drama	Role	Director	Notes
2005	Sada Kalo		Aranya Anwar	
	Otopor Nurul Huda		Aranya Anwar	
2006–2007	Vober Hat	Ayna Parveen	Salauddin Lavlu	Drama serial
2010	I Luv u, Me 2		Iftakar Chowdhury	

=== Music video ===
Year	Song	Singer	Director
2019	"Laal Sobuj" (Cricket Song)	Dinat Jahan Munni, Ayub Shahriar, Sabbir Zaman, Ahmed Humayun, Ronty Das, Tasnim Aurin, Arif & Masum	Ziauddin Alam

== Awards and achievements ==
Title winner of Miss Asia Pacific Bangladesh 2011

Year	Awards	Category	Film	Result
2013	Meril Prothom Alo Awards	Third Stage Nomination for Best Film Actress	Full And Final	Nominated
2013	Bioscope Borsho-sera	Best Film Actress	Dehorokkhi	Nominated
2015	Salman Shah Smrity Award	Best Film Actress		Won
