= Morteza Atashzamzam =

Iranian film director and producer

- Born: 27 November 1977 (age 48); Isfahan, Iran
- Occupations: Film director and producer
- Years active: 2002–present
- Notable work: Simin (2018), Melancholy (2016)

Morteza Atashzamzam is an Iranian film director and producer who was born in 1977 in Isfahan, Iran.

== Career ==
Morteza Atashzamzam graduated from university in Computer Sciences. Since 2002, he has directed and produced more than forty independent films, documentaries, and television series. He was the director of Bam Film Festival (2008 & 2010). The 2016 film Melancholy was his first feature film as a director.

== Filmography ==
=== Documentary ===
Year	Title	Place of production	Director	Producer	Achievements
2007	An Opera from the Deep	France, Paris	Yes	No	Broadcast from IRIB TV1
2008	Tsunami	Indonesia	Yes	Yes	Broadcast from IRIB TV1
2010	A Sister in Lahore	Pakistan	Yes	Yes	Broadcast from IRIB TV1
2014	Freiborg	Germany	Yes	No	Broadcast from IRIB TV1
2014	Pinocchio	Italy, Florence	Yes	No	Broadcast from IRIB TV1
2014	The River Which Was Killed	Iran	Yes	Yes	Special Award of the Jury of the 16th Grand Cinema of Iran Cinema
2015	Kualalampur	Malaysia	Yes	No	Broadcast from IRIB TV1
2015	We Don't Anything from the President	Iran	Yes	Yes	Confidential
2018	Buddha's Shame	Bangladesh	Yes	Yes	Screened at the 37th Fajr World Market Festival

=== Film ===
Year	Title	Place of production	Director	Producer	Achievements
2010	Dead-end	Lebanon	Yes	Yes	Attended Fajr International Film Festival
2011	White Death	Iran	Yes	Yes	Attended Fajr International Film Festival
2016	Melancholy	Iran	Yes	Yes	Selected film by the Association of Bulgarian Filmmakers in the 25th period Bulgaria's Varna Festival in International Competition
2018	Simin	Iran	Yes	Yes	Special Award of the Jury at the Baikal Film Festival Jury in Serbia, Russia
2020-21	Zoleikha's liver	Iran	Yes	Yes	
2022	Din–The Day	Bangladesh and Iran	Yes	Yes	
2025	Fereshteh	Bangladesh and Iran	Yes	Yes	Won — Iran National Film Awards for Best Film

=== Series ===
Year	Title	Place of Production	Director	Producer	Achievements
2004	The Last Report	Lebanon	Yes	Yes	Broadcast from IRIB TV1
2008	Shadows of The City	Lebanon	Yes	Yes	Broadcast from IRIB TV1
2011	The Shadow of Sultan	Iran, France, Lebanon	Yes	Yes	Broadcast from IRIB TV2
2014	Khatoon	Iran	Yes	Yes	Broadcast from 4 different TV channels

=== Others ===
Year	Title	Place of production	Director	Producer	Type of work	Achievements
2001	The Friend	Iran			Short Film	Broadcast from IRIB TV1, Best Short Film at Iran Local TV Film Festival
2011	The Lost Paradise	Iran	No	Yes	Documentary Series	Broadcast from IRIB TV1
