= Dennis Lau =

Malaysian electric violinist, pianist, songwriter and producer

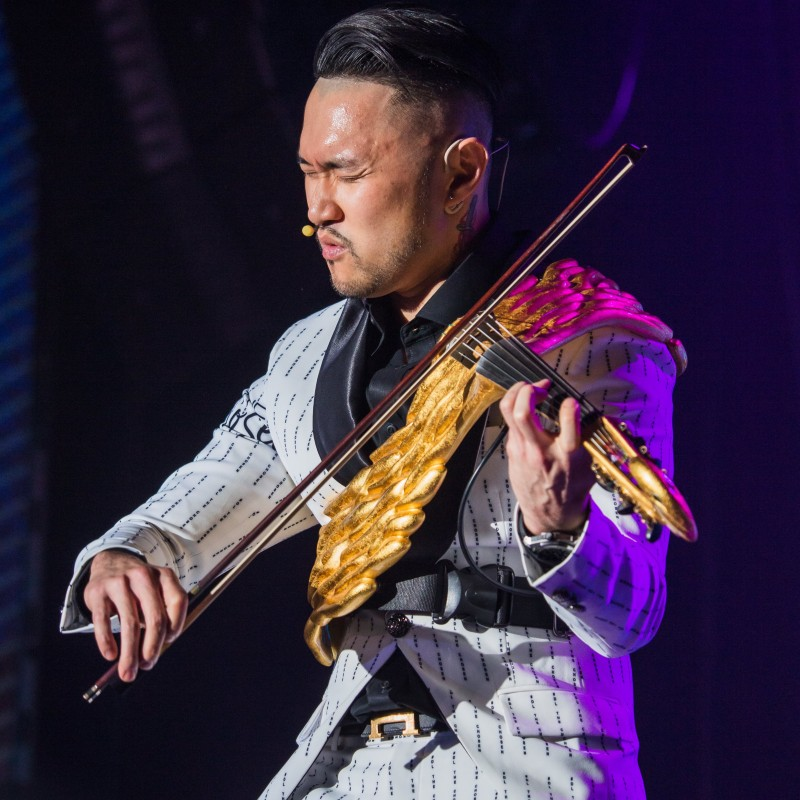
- Born: 9 September 1985 (age 41); Ipoh, Perak, Malaysia
- Occupations: Violinist; pianist; composer; producer
- Years active: 2006–present
- Website: dennislau.thechosen.io

Dennis Lau (born 9 September 1985) is a Malaysian electric violinist, pianist, songwriter and producer based in Kuala Lumpur, Malaysia. He released his debut album DiversiFy in 2009.

== Early life ==
Dennis Lau was born on 9 September 1985 in Teluk Intan, Ipoh, Perak. His father, Lau Chee Chun, worked in the corporate sector, and his mother, Chuah Chai Eng, was a pianist. Lau began playing the piano at age three and started violin lessons at age eight.

Lau holds several qualifications in classical piano, including the ATCL (Associate of Trinity College London), AMusA (Associate Diploma in Music, Australia), ABRSM (Associate Board of the Royal Schools of Music) and LGSM (Licentiate of the Guildhall of Music).

== Education ==
Lau attended UCSI University in Kuala Lumpur, Malaysia. He graduated in 2006 with a Bachelor of Music under the Newcastle Australian Music Degree Program, majoring in violin at the School of Music. The release of his album DiversiFy (Limited Edition) in 2010 included a short film screened at the university.

During his studies, Lau performed as a soloist with the Universiti Malaya Symphony Orchestra (UMSO) for Sultan Azlan Shah. He also worked as a regular session musician with the RTM Orchestra and National Symphony Orchestra, and held the position of first violinist for the Malaysian Philharmonic Youth Orchestra (MPYO).

In 2006, Lau collaborated with David Tao during Tao's "Love Can" concert.

== Career ==
Lau performed with the jazz band James Boyle and the Ragged Tigers at the Penang Island Jazz Festival and the Genting International Jazz Festival.

In 2007, he founded Mosaic Music Entertainment and Mosaic Movie Productions.

Lau released his first album, DiversiFy, in November 2009. The album featured classical music fused with jazz, hip-hop, and R&B styles. It was distributed by Sony Music Entertainment Malaysia. DiversiFy received the Best Producer award at the Voice Independent Music Awards (VIMA) 2009.

A limited edition of DiversiFy was released in November 2010. This version included trailers, behind-the-scenes footage, a soundtrack, and three bonus tracks. It featured collaborations with Altimet on "Syukur" and saxophonist Jimmy Sax on "Reflection". Lau produced a short film, "Prelude in F Minor", directed by Adrian Lai and starring Daphne Iking and Steve Yap. The film was sponsored by UCSI University and launched at Zouk KL.

In 2010, Lau collaborated with beatboxer Shawn Lee on the project "Unity of Arts".

In August 2012, Lau released the single "Gotcha Style", featuring Moots of Pop Shuvit, Thanuja Ananthan, and Bernard Chandran. Distributed by Sony Music Entertainment, the single debuted on the HITZ.FM English Chart.

In 2014, Lau worked with the National Department for Culture and Arts (JKKN) to publish A Malaysian Journey, an album of classic Malay songs featuring artists such as Amy Search, Siti Nurhaliza, Ning Baizura, and David Arumugam. An international version, titled The Journey, was released the following year. The album took five years to complete and included collaborations with Jojo Struys, Abigail Chew, Michael Leaner, Soo Wincci, Edmond Chong, Yuri Wong, Moots, and Tat Tong.

Lau held a concert titled "Dennis Lau & Friends: The Phoenix Rising" in Kuala Lumpur in October 2016.

In 2018, he collaborated with Singaporean musician Hanjin Tan on the tracks "Lafite", "Da Call", and "You Are The Most Beautiful". A music video for their earlier composition "Marry Me" was filmed in Donegal, Ireland, in 2016.

In June 2019, Lau held the concert "Dennis Lau & Friends: The Chosen".

During the COVID-19 pandemic in 2020, Lau founded "My Chicken King", a poultry supply business. The business later expanded to include other food products under the name "Ah Lau Food King".

== Discography ==
=== Albums ===
- DiversiFy (2009)
- DiversiFy Limited Edition (2010)
- A Malaysian Journey (2014)
- The Journey (2015)

=== Singles ===
- "Abadi Kita" featuring Aisyah Aziz (2017)
- "Esok" featuring Aisyah Aziz, Chyme, Dania Hidayah, Dash, Dewi Seriestha, Fara Dolhadi, Jade, Jeryl Lee, Lee Elaine, Natalie, Nursyasya Batrisyia, Razin, Stacy Jean, and Varsha (2017)
- "I Wanna Be Free" featuring Jeryl Lee (2017)
- "The Good Fight" (2017)
- "The Chosen" featuring Adam Izzy (2018)
- "ESOK" featuring Fara Dolhadi (2020)
- "GLORY" (2023)
- "I Won't Go" featuring Amir Masdi (2023)

== Filmography ==
- Nasi Lemak 2.0 – as Lan Qiao (2011)
- Hantu Gangster – as Ah Hua (2012)
- The Borneo Incident – as a local guide (2013)
- Nasi Lemak 1.0 – as Lan Qiao (2022)
