= Dasha Logan =

Malaysian singer

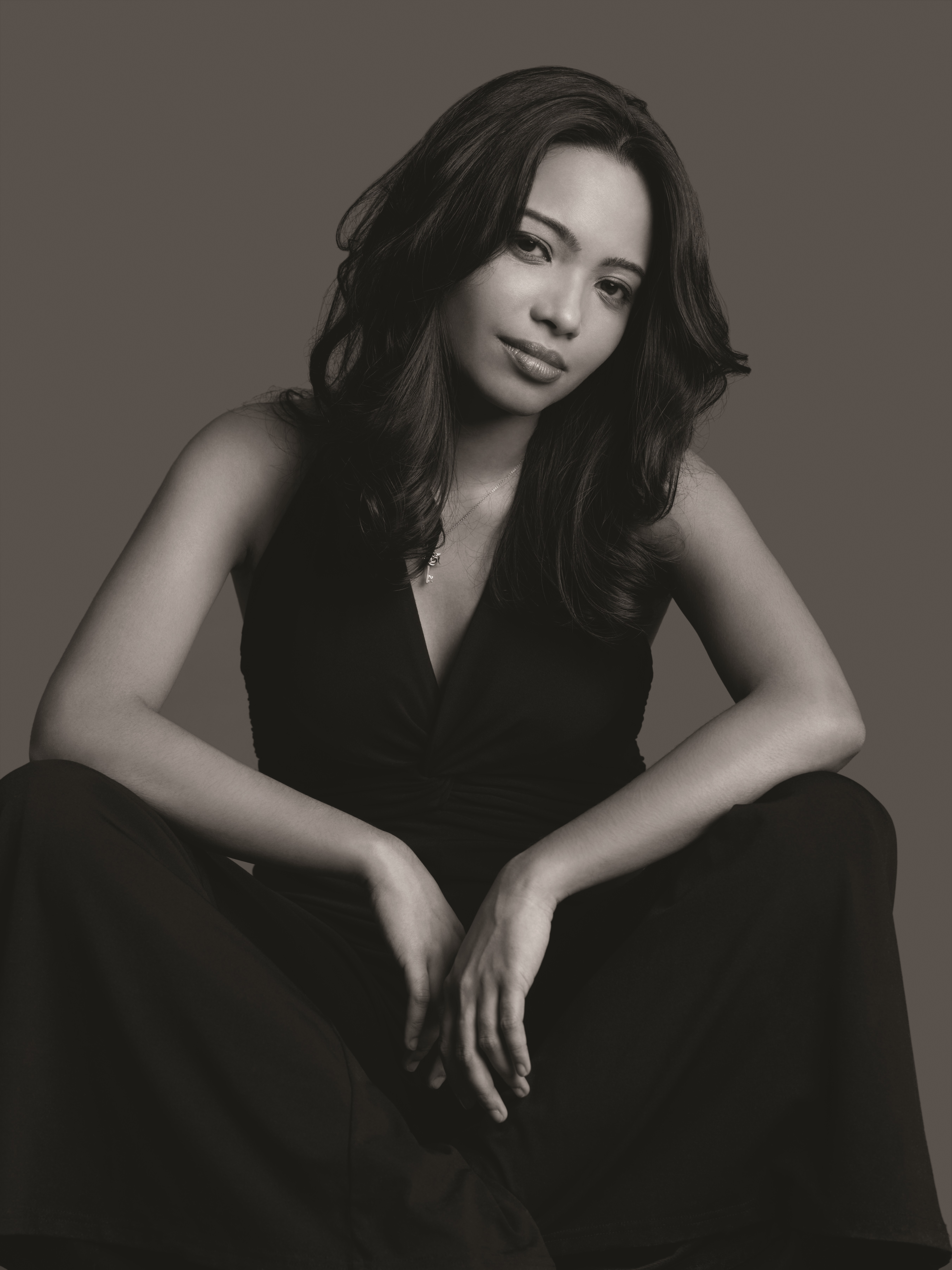
- Born: Priyadashini d/o Loganathan; December 17, 1987 (age 38); Penang, Malaysia
- Occupations: Singer; Songwriter
- Years active: 2004–present
- Relatives: Loganathan Arumugam (father); David Arumugam (uncle)
- Musical career
- Genres: Jazz, soul, R&B
- Instrument: Vocals
- Website: dashalogan.com

Priyadashini Loganathan (born December 17, 1987), known professionally as Dasha Logan, is a Malaysian singer-songwriter. She began her professional singing career at age 17 in her home town of Penang, Malaysia. Dasha is the daughter of Loganathan from the Malaysian band Alleycats. She is primarily a jazz and soul singer, best known for her song "Cleverly" which reached the number 1 spot on the UK Soul Chart in December 2014. Born and raised in Penang island, Malaysia, she began performing in 2004 with a weekly slot at Brazil 68 on Penang's Kelawei Road. She went on to perform regularly at multiple other venues on the island, culminating in a month-long residency at G Hotel's G Spot on Gurney Drive. Having moved to the nation's capital in 2011, Logan now performs at many of Kuala Lumpur's top music venues.

In 2015 she released her second single "Leave Your Man". She is currently in the process of recording her self-titled debut studio album.

== Early life and education ==
Logan was born December 17, 1987, in Adventist Hospital Penang. Her father, Loganathan Arumugam, was one of the founding members and co-lead singer of the band Alleycats. Her mother, Susan Lovie, was a stay-at-home mother who retired soon after getting married. She has a brother, Vigneshwaran. Logan attended SRK Island Girls School, SMK Convent Lebuh Light and Saint Xaviers Institution, where she completed her secondary education. She then attended Kolej Damansara Utama, Penang, where she completed a diploma in Mass Communications.

== Career ==
=== 2004 ===
Logan began performing professionally at age 17 in a Brazilian restaurant in Penang, singing mainly jazz songs in English, Spanish and Portuguese. She became a regular in the Penang music scene, performing at various venues such as Bagan, China House and GSpot.

=== 2010 ===
After moving to Kuala Lumpur, she began making waves in the music industry in Malaysia with regular performances at prestigious music venues such as No Black Tie, Mezze and Alexis. In May, she traveled to London in the hope of meeting producers and other musicians. It was there that she met Amy Winehouse's guitarist Robbin Banerjee. The two would go on to record a music video together in late 2011 and later to perform multiple sold-out shows at No Black Tie in 2016 and again in 2019.

=== 2014–2015 ===
In December 2014, Logan's first single Cleverly reached the number 1 spot on the UK Soul Chart. This was met with acclaim in her native Malaysia, where she received an award from the Malaysian Book of Records for being the first Malaysian to have a number 1 hit single on an international chart. Cleverly made it on to the Malaysian English Top 10 chart on Malaysia's Hitz.fm radio station and Logan was nominated for Best Female Artist at the MET10 music awards ceremony in 2015. In September 2015, Logan performed at Malaysia Night in London's Trafalgar Square.

=== 2020 ===
As of 2020, Logan was working on her first studio album. Self-titled, "Dasha Logan" is expected to be released in December 2020.

== Discography ==
=== Singles ===
- "Cleverly" (2014)
- "Leave Your Man" (2015)
- "Bangai Sungai Maya" (Arvind Raj & Dasha Logan, from the Kabali Original Motion Picture Soundtrack, 2016)
- "Time and Space" (featured on "Non Linear Time" EP by 528, 2018)

=== Studio albums ===
- "Dasha Logan" (2021, expected release)

== Awards ==
- Malaysian Book of Records 2015: First Malaysian to have a number one song on an international chart
- Malaysian Music Idol 2017

== Nominations ==
- Best Female Artist, MET10 awards 2015
