= Karen Kong =

Malaysian singer and actress

- Born: 7 December 1984 (age 41); Labuan, Malaysia
- Origin: Labuan, Malaysia
- Genres: Pop
- Occupations: Singer, actor
- Years active: 2006–present
- Labels: Prodigee Records, Universal Music

Karen Kong (simplified Chinese: 龚柯允; traditional Chinese: 龔柯允; Jyutping: Gung1 O1 Wan5; Pe̍h-ōe-jī: Kióng Koa-ún; Pha̍k-fa-sṳ: Kiông Khô-iûn) is a Malaysian singer and actress.

== Biography ==
Karen Kong (or Karen K to her fans) is from Labuan Island, Malaysia. She was a student of S.M St Anne, Labuan, S.M.K Labuan, Tunku Abdul Rahman University College and Universiti Tunku Abdul Rahman (UTAR). She was a participant in Malaysian Idol in 2004, but she was eliminated in the first round.

Kong's debut single was launched in January 2007. She immediately garnered attention due to her entire album being written in Malay. Her debut EP also includes her singles Cinta Hello Kitty and Ku Tak Upaya, both penned by fellow Malaysian songwriter Asmin Mudin (writer of Malaysian Idol Jaclyn Victor's Gemilang). Both were featured on several radio station top charts including ERA, Xfresh and others.

On 15 January 2007, Kong released her full Malay album, Mulakan, which not only featured the debut single, but also nine other tracks including Na Na Na Nada Cinta, a remake of the Japanese song La La La Love Song by Toshinobu Kubota.

On 17 July 2007, she made a first in the Malaysian music scene by being the first artiste to hold a web concert. In September, she announced her plan to produce a Mandarin album (and her Chinese stage name, as stated above). The album, titled Showtime, which has since been finished and scheduled for release on 27 October, however, hit a snag when it was found that retail stores refuse to distribute or sell the album. This lead her company to only sell her album in a 50-leg promotional tour around the country.

In 2009, Universal Music decided to bring her international recognition by re-launching her career in Taiwan. The new album I'm Karen released on 10 July 2009 to serves as an introduction of the rising star to the Chinese music fans. It comes with songs from her first Chinese album Showtime plus four new songs, including the first plug AEIOU (a remake of The Ting Tings' Great DJ, famously featured in the trailer for Slumdog Millionaire).

== Discography ==
=== Albums and EPs ===
- Mulakan (2007)
1. "Prelude (Mulakan)"
2. "Mulakan"
3. "Oh Kekasih!" ft. Shazzy
4. "Cinta Hello Kitty"
5. "Juli DoReMi"
6. "Ku Tak Upaya"
7. "Na Na Na Nada Cinta" ft. 3 flow (remake of La La La Love Song)
8. "Bintang"
9. "Dalam Bahasa Sayu"
10. "Sama-sama Menjulang" ft. Ferhad
11. "Na Na Na Nada Cinta – piano version"
12. "Cinta Hello Kitty – Karaoke ver."
13. "Ku Tak Upaya – Karaoke ver."
- 表演 Showtime (2007)
1. "离岛 li dao"
2. "表演 Showtime (biao yan)" ft. Namewee
3. "阵阵跳 zhen zhen tiao" (remake of Akan)
4. "居家旅行 ju jia lv xing"
5. "沉默•秘密 chen mo mi mi" (remake of Dalam Bahasa Sayu)
6. "你在哪里？ ni zai na li"
7. "你笨啊你！ni ben a ni"
8. "爱情 ai qing" (remake of Ku Tak Upaya)
9. "天堂 tian tang"

Bonus Tracks

1. In Love Again
2. "离岛 li dao acoustic ver."
- I'm Karen (2009)
1. "ㄚ一ㄨㄟㄛ AEIOU"
2. "粉红电光 fen hong dian guang (Pink Electric Lights)"
3. "邻居 lin jv (Neighbours)"
4. "舔伤 tian shang (Lick The Wounds)"
5. "不要放晴 bu yao fang qing (Don't Cleared)"
6. "阵阵跳 zhen zhen tiao (Flying Jump)"
7. "离岛 li dao (Leaving The Island)"
8. "爱情 ai qing (Love)"
9. "你笨阿你! ni ben a ni (Ah, Are You Stupid!)"
10. "你在哪裡? ni zai na li (Where Are You?)"
11. "邻居 lin jv acoustic ver. (Neighbours)"
12. In Love Again
- "做我自己" Single (2012)

== Filmography ==
=== Film ===
- Nasi Lemak 2.0 (2011)
- Nasi Lemak 1.0 (2022)

=== Television Show ===
Year	Title	Network	Role	Note
2020	King Maker III	ViuTV	Contestant	
2023	King Maker V Final	ViuTV	Performer	Performed with contestant Ash Lu
