= Nirab Hossain =

Bangladeshi film actor and model

- নিরব
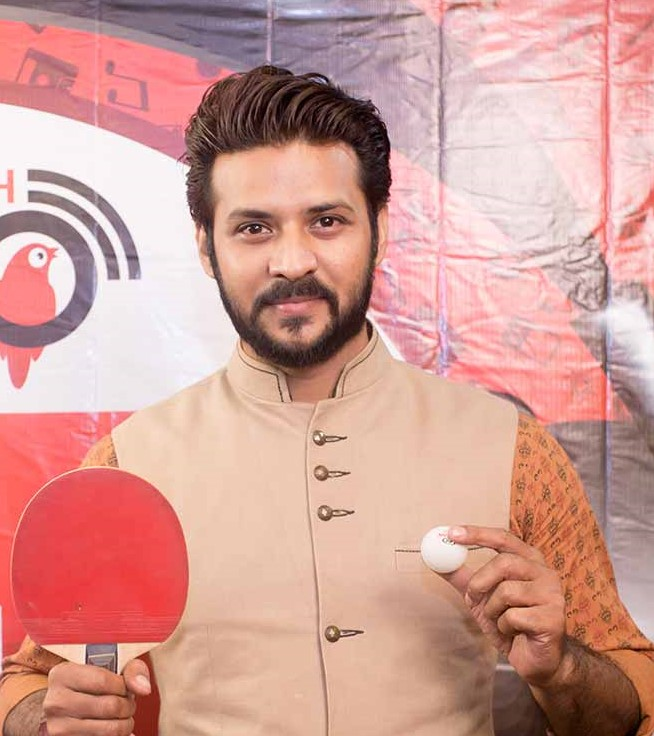
- Nirab in 2018
- Born: 2 July 1985 (age 41); Dhaka, Bangladesh
- Occupations: Actor; Model
- Years active: 2009 – present
- Spouse: Tasfia Taher Ridhi (m. 2014)

Md Shakhawat Hossain Nirab who is known by his stage name as Nirab or Nirab Hossain, is a Bangladeshi film actor and model. Nirab started his career by modeling. After modeling for a couple of years, he acted in several television commercials, dramas and later he started working in films. He is best known for his Banglalink tvc add. He made his debut with the 2009 film Mon Jekhane Hridoy Sekhane opposite Apu Biswas and Shakib Khan.

He debuted in the 2015 Malaysian film Banglasia which is being written and directed by Namewee and produced by Fred Chong and 2017 Bollywood film Sheitaan which is being written and produced by film maker Faisal Saif and directed by Sameer Khan.

== Personal life ==
Nirab married Riddhi on 26 December 2014.

== Filmography ==
Key
†	Denotes films that have not yet been released

Year	Film	Role	Notes	Ref.
2009	Mon Jekhane Hridoy Sekhane	Sagor	Debut film	
2009	Shaheb Name Golam			
2009	Mon Diyechi Tomake	Arjo		
2009	Mone Boro Koshto	Romeo		
2009	Guru Bhai	Maya		
2010	Boroloker Dosh Din Goriber Ek Din	Srabon Chowdhury		
2010	Bolona Tumi Amar	Akash		
2011	Maa Amar Chokher Moni	Sumon		
2011	Bondhu Tumi Shotru Tumi	Nirab		
2012	I Love You	Sagor		
2012	Raja Surjo Kha			
2012	Tumi Ashbe Bole	Nirab		
2012	Atmodan	Nirab		
2013	Jibon Nodir Tire	Nirab		
2013	Eito Bhalobasha	Nirab		
2013	Tomar Majhe Ami	Nirab		
2013	Kumari Maa	Jayed		
2014	Ek Cup Cha	Himself	Special appearance	
2014	Char Okkhorer Bhalobasha	Badol		
2015	Game	Maya		
2015	Moner Ojante	Nirab		
2015	Nodijon	Sujon		
2016	Bhola To Jay Na Tare	Rudra		
2017	Raaz-E-Sheitaan	Sameer Khan	Debut in Hindi film	
2017	Game Returns	Maya		
2017	Islamic Exorcist	Sameer	English-Hindi bilingual film	
2018	Ranga Mon	Raj		
2019	Abbas	Abbas	Won– Babisas Awards for Best Film Actor	
2019	Banglasia	Dirty Harris	Debut Malaysian Film	
2020	Hridoy Jurey	Amit	Nominated– CJFB Performance Award for Best Film Actor	
2021	Koshai	Abir		
2021	Chokh	Rakesh		
2022	Omanush	Osman	Won– BIFA Awards for Best Film Actor	
2023	Phire Dekha	Amin	Based on Bangladesh Liberation War	
2023	Casino	ACP Nawaz		
2024	Chhaya Brikkho	Anup		
2024	Suswagatom	Hasan		
2024	Duniya	Haider		
2026	Separation †	TBA	Filming	
TBA	Shironaam †	Ibrahim		
TBA	Desh †	Desh		
TBA	Operation Jackpot †	TBA	Announced	

=== Music video ===
Year	Title	Singer	Notes	Ref.
2012	"Priyo Jai Jai Bolo Na"	Kona		
2020	"Hridoye Tomar Thikana"	Papon, Tamanna Prome		
2021	"Tui R Ami"	Taposh featuring Arfin Rumey	Won – Iconic Model Awards for Best Film Actor	
2021	"Emoni Ek Dhadha"	Taposh featuring S.I. Tutul		

== Television ==
Year	Drama	Role	Director	Network	Notes	Ref
2006	Onnorokom Bhalobasha					
2007	Kobi Bolechen	Nirab	Iftekhar Ahmed Fahmi	NTV		
2007	Bhoot Odbhut		Hanif Sonket			
2008	Hypocrite		Chayanika Chowdhury	RTV		
	Hotath Theme Jawa Ek Fota Brishti		Siddiqur Rahman			
2009	Nayika Nupur		Salman Haidar			
	Nishabde Ami		Shahidul Islam Sohel			
	Tin Bondhu					
	Cinema	Special Appearance	Iftekhar Ahmed Fahmi			
	Onno Ek Somudro		Mohon Khan	ATN Bangla		
	Vagfol		Mohammad Mostafa Kamal Raz			
	Late Night Show		Noyeem Imtiaz Neyamul			
	FM Songbed		Chayanika Chowdhury			
	Ekdin Bhalobasha		Ayman A			
	Alomelo Mon		Chayanika Chowdhury	RTV		
	40 Minute Por		Chayanika Chowdhury			
	Ekla Cholore		Chayanika Chowdhury			
	Dukkho Baro Mash				TV Mini-Series	
	Giringibaaz		Nazrul Quraishi			
	Mumur Jonno		Noyeem Imtiaz Neyamul	NTV		
	Ekjon Roisuddin		Mizanur Rahman Labu			
	Swapno Dilam Tomay	Mishu	Saif Uddin Ahmed Saju	Desh TV		
	Nirob Bhalobasha		Muntasir Rosy			
	Shei Meyeti		Shakhawat Manik			
	Kingbodonti Fire Aso		Mahbuba Islam Shumi	ATN Bangla		
	Shorto Projojjo		Shakhawat Manik			
	Bibrom Bilash		SM Ripon		TV Mini-Series	
2015	Akash Meghe Dhaka		Nazmul Haque Bappy	NTV		
2015	Natokio Bhalobasha		Hasan Jahangir			
	Duiye Duiye Pas		Noyeem Imtiaz Neyamul			
	Shadow		Mir Asaduzzaman Aryan			
	Dorjar Opashe		B.U Shuvo	ATN Bangla		
	Atim Daroga					
	Chotushkon		B.U Shuvo	ATN Bangla		
	Ekti Bari		Anjan Aich			
	Robot Bou				Telefilm	
	Chupkotha		Shakhawat Manik			
	Mitalir Chithi		Ashraful Rahman	Channel i	Telefilm	
2016	Bhut Adbhut		Shakhawat Manik			
2016	Ek Mutho Bhalobasha		Anonno Emon	Boishakhi Tv	Eid Telefilm	
2016	Sairen		Anjan Aich	NTV	Eid Telefilm	
2016	Bolte Chai Bhalobashi		Rajib Rosul	Boishakhi Tv		
	Shudhu Tomare Jonyo		Progga Niharika	NTV		
2016	Osthir Gangchil		Mohon Khan	Bangla Vision	Eid Natok	
	Onuvobe Bhalobasha		Hasan Jahangir			
2017	Valobasha Valobashi		SA Haque Olike	SA TV	TV Mini-Series	
2017	Paglu		Hasan Jahangir	Asian TV	TV Mini-Series	
	Dujon Dujonar		Hasan Jahangir	Boishakhi Tv		
	Dhorish Na More Jabo		Shahzada Mamun	Boishakhi Tv		
	Shunnota Ebong Bhalobashar Golpo		Faridul Islam			
	Valobashay Dhoka		Giasuddin Tushar			
	Tomar Karone		Shafiqul Islam Shawkat			
	Hotath Bhalobasha		Ahmed Azim Titu			
	Shesh Oddhai		Enamul Haque Khan	Channel i		
	Shagor Jole Kar Chaya		B.U Shuvo			
2017	Kichu Atpoure Jiboner Golpo		Mahmud Didar	Channel i	Eid Natok	
2017	Shamdesher Sundarban		Rajib Hasan	Channel i	Eid Telefilm	
2017	Bujhineto Ami		Pollob Biswas	Channel i	Telefilm	
2017	Dead Line		Sazzad Hossain Dodul			
2017	Cafe Dayan		Sazzad Sony	SA TV	Eid Telefilm	
2018	Dustu Cheler Misty Prem		Mohon Khan	Bangla Vision	Eid Telefilm	
2018	Portrait		Md Maksudur Rahman Bishal	NTV		
2018	Anurodh		Mehedi Hasan Mukul	NTV		
	Juddho O Priyojon		Mushfiqur Rahman Gulzar	Channel i		
	Journey By Romance		Raza Raz and Sadat Sahed			
	Prakton Premika		Mahbuba Islam Sumi	Channel i		
2021	Bou Tumi Amar		Parthib Mamun	Channel i		
2021	La Perouser Surjasto		Abu Hayat Mahmud	Channel i		
2022	Ghran		Arif Khan	NTV		
2024	Heror Agomon		Md. Mahmud Hasan Sikder	Channel i		
