= Banglasia =

Banglasia Banglasia 2.0
- Banglasia Movie Poster
- Directed by: Namewee
- Written by: Namewee
- Produced by: Fred Chong
- Starring: Nirab; Saiful Apek; Namewee; David Arumugam; Atikah Suhamie; Yoo Ah Min/Lao Zha Bor; Shashi Tharan; Zhu Youliu
- Production companies: Namewee Studio Production; Grape Seed Media Entertainment Productions
- Release dates: March 2015 (Osaka Asian Film Festival); 28 February 2019 (2.0)
- Running time: 82 minutes (Original and 2.0)
- Country: Malaysia
- Languages: Malay; Mandarin; English; Bengali
- Budget: MYR 2 million

Banglasia or Banglasia 2.0 (Chinese: 猛加拉殺手/猛加拉殺手2.0) is a Malaysian action comedy film by Namewee, released on 28 February 2019. The story follows several Malaysians of different races and a Bangladeshi worker as they come together to defend the country comically against the invasion of the fictional Luk Luk Kingdom.

The cast includes Namewee himself, Bangladeshi actor Nirab, Malaysian artists Saiful Apek, David Arumugam of the Alleycats, Shashi Tharen, Zhu Youliu, Singaporean artists Atikah Suhaime and Yoo Ah Min/Lao Zha Bor. The budget was more than RM 2 million, and was shot in Kuala Lumpur's Petaling Street.

The film was made in 2013. Despite having completed filming in that year, Namewee revealed in a 2014 video that the Film Censorship Board of Malaysia had banned the original film version over scrutiny of 31 scenes that were deemed objectionable by the board. The original uncut version was shown in 2015 at three film festivals.

On 12 February 2019, five years later, after having 7 scenes reedits or cut, a small reshoot and updates, the board finally approved Banglasia for public screening in Malaysia, retitled Banglasia 2.0.

== Synopsis ==
The film focuses on three characters from different backgrounds: Harris (Nirab), a Bangladeshi worker in Malaysia who just wants to return to his hometown to marry the love of his life; Hanguoren (Namewee), a pro-Malaysian activist who wants his fellow citizens to join him in regaining the country in its natural state without immigrants; and Rina (Atikah Suhaime), an idealistic daughter of a boss who has fallen for Harris at first sight.

The trio, along with several other characters, have to survive the sudden invasion of the nearby fictional Luk Luk Kingdom. The films touches and satires on social issues such as corruption, inequality, human trafficking, ethnic relations, and also cultural understandings between the characters.

== Cast ==
- Nirab as Harris
- Namewee as Han Guo Ren (韓國仁), also portrayed Han De De
- Saiful Apek as Omar
- David Arumugam as Raja Luk Luk
- Atikah Suhamie as Rina, Yana Koh as Injured Rina
- Shashi Tharan as Wira
- Lao Zha Bo (尤雅敏) as Han's Grandma
- Zhu You Liu (朱宥六) as Ah Seng
- Craze (神導) as Balak
- Alfa Wong as Satu, fictional version of Najib Razak
- Bao (發财寶) as Rose, Satu's wife, frictional version of Rosmah Mansor, Najib Razak's wife
- Vimalan Mathiakgan as Katak
- Pak Limra as Putih
- Bean (密史得賓) as Ah Bean
- Teacher Hew (丘老师 (德财)) as Ah Chai
- Mizanur Rahman as Dirty Harris' Best Friend
- Sukarnia Venugopal as Harris's Mother
- Raja Ilya as Laboni
- Deen Maidin as Laboni's father
- Kinki Ryusaki as Aki, Han guo ren's Girlfriend
- Chong Sau Lin as Magician
- Han Xiiao Aii (韓曉噯) as Thai Nurse
- Jack Lim as Hostage (security guard)
- Ling Big Yong as High School Kid 1
- Joseph Germani as High School Kid 2

== Release ==
=== Banning ===
The film was originally scheduled for release on 30 January 2014, the Lunar New Year's Eve in Malaysia, but because the film dealt with Malaysian politics, it faced difficulties from the Film Censorship Board of Malaysia. The board states 31 scenes that is objectionable. Deleting or altering all 31 scenes would require major re-shootings of the film, and because those points are major plot for most of the film, reshootings seems unlikely. After several twists and turns, Banglasia was officially declared banned. One of the reasons for the original version of the movie is being banned was that it portrayed sympathetically the gay lifestyle in Malaysia. The Malaysian Home Ministry claimed that the film “accentuated negative sociocultural lifestyles such as lesbian gay bisexual transgender (LGBT)” and at the same time “ridiculed the capacity and role of security troops in maintaining peace as well as national security.”

Nevertheless, the original uncut film version was publicly shown for the first time in Southeast Asia at the Singapore International Film Festival held in December 2015, also at the New York Asian Film Festival and Osaka Asian Film Festival in the same year. In 2019, after several times of appealing, the film was finally unbanned.

=== Kickstarter campaign ===
In December 2015, Namewee had opened up a Kickstarter campaign seeking to raise USD 500,000 within 40 days to partially recoup their initial production cost of more than RM4 million (USD 1 million) so that they can afford to release the movie globally for free. Part of the funds would be used to pay for extra post-production editing, and qualified donors would receive their mentions of name in the front and end credits. Wee however failed to reach his accomplished goal as he confirmed on his Facebook page where he only collected USD 186,468, which did not even reach half of his intended money needed.

=== Banning lifted and Banglasia 2.0 ===
On 12 February 2019, Banglasia movie producers received official notification of approval from the board. After a six-year wait, Namewee and the filmmakers say they are relieved that the movie will finally make it into cinemas although they have had to make cut 7 scenes and do a reshoot to update the story with new scenes to make it relevant.

Scenes cut from the film include gun shooting scenes, LGBT-suggestive scenes, a scene mentioning the MyKad, and a scene which compares the safety of Malaysians and Singaporeans. The scenes cut do not affect the storyline.

Namewee retitled his movie as Banglasia 2.0, announcing that his movie is headed for release in Malaysia cinemas nationwide on 28 February 2019.
