= Estet =

- Theatrical release poster
- Directed by: Mamat Khalid
- Produced by: Mamat Khalid
- Starring: Shashi Tharan; Farid Kamil; Jasmin; Soffi Jikan; Gandii Nathen; Kamarul; Mohan; Jayasree
- Cinematography: Indra Che Muda
- Production companies: Naga VXS Sdn Bhd; Perkasa Filem, Perkasa Filem Sdn Bhd
- Release date: 4 November 2010
- Running time: 90 minutes
- Country: Malaysia
- Languages: Malay; Tamil
- Budget: MYR 1.97 million
- Box office: MYR 0.35 million

Estet (English: Estate) is a 2010 Malaysian Malay-language romantic comedy-drama film directed by Mamat Khalid. It was released 4 November 2010. The film was nominated for 10 categories in the 23rd Malaysia Film Festival, in which it won the Special Jury Award category while one of its actors, Shashi Taran, won the Most Promising Actor category.

== Cast ==
- Shashi Tharan as Shashi
- Farid Kamil as Farid, Shashi's Malay friend.
- Jasmin as Geetha, Shashi's sister.
- Soffi Jikan as Junna
- K. Veerasingam as Ponniah
- Kamarul Haji Yusof as Yaacop, Farid's father
- Gandii Nathen as Apaa Shashi, Shashi's father.
- Mislina Mustaffa as Kak Lina
- Mohan as Mohan
- Jayasree as Jayasree
- Rosyam Nor as Kublai Khan

David Arumugam of the band Alleycats also makes a brief cameo appearance in the film.
