= Resh (Malaysian singer) =

- Also known as: Reshmonu (2003–2015)
- Born: Hiresh Haridas; 26 May 1976 (age 50)
- Origin: Malacca, Malaysia
- Genres: R&B, soul, hip hop
- Occupation: Singer-songwriter
- Years active: 1994–present
- Label: Universal Music

Hiresh Haridas (born 26 May 1976 in Malacca), better known by his stage name Reshmonu, is a singer-songwriter from Malaysia who does mostly English songs. He is known for songs such as "Walk Away", "Cintaku Pergi", "Hey Waley" and "Superfine". He is of Malayali descent. In July 2015, he rebranded himself as just Resh, claiming that "Reshmonu" was a part of his "coming-of-age" process.

He is among a small number of Malaysian artists who have consistently performed as an opening act for international acts touring in Malaysia, such as Alicia Keys, Prodigy, Pussycat Dolls and Black Eoas. He also has a notable following in Malaysia, Indonesia, Singapore and the Philippines.

== Career ==
Before pursue his solo career, Reshmonu was formerly a member of the now-defunct Malaysian hip hop group Naughtius Maximus from 1994 to 1996 where he went by his stage name, Fresh, before changing his stage name to Reshmonu.

=== 2003–2008: Breakthrough ===
Reshmonu released his debut album, Monumental, in 2003 under Dhanosh Records, after taking four years to complete. The album impressed critics and fans with hit singles "Walk Away", "Like This", "Pirivu" and "It's You That Matters". The album earned him seven Anugerah Industri Muzik nominations in 2004, of which he won three awards (Best Male Vocals, Best New English Artist, Best Engineering for an Album). "It's You That Matters" was remade in Mandarin by Evonne Hsu, titled "Wǒ yào qīng qīng wèi nǐ chàng shǒu gē" (我要輕輕為你唱首歌, "I Wanna Sing a Song For You").

Reshmonu subsequently released a repackaged album under Sony BMG entitled Monumental – The Journey Continues in December 2004 which included "Kiranya Tiada Lagi" (the Malay version of "Walk Away") and the chart topping hit "Hey Waley".

Universal Music Malaysia took an interest in Reshmonu and, in 2007, collaborated with him to release his third Malaysian English album entitled Superfine, with a gala live outdoor concert at The Curve, Kota Damansara. Over 5,000 fans, representatives from the media and members of the local corporate and music fraternities attended. Among the singles from Superfine were "Superfine" (the title track) and "The Way It Makes You Move".

=== 2008–2013 ===
Reshmonu made his directorial debut on his second music video for "The Way It Makes You Move", the second single from the album "Superfine". This earned him a nomination in the 2008 AIM Awards under the ‘Best Music Video’ Award category.

Reshmonu launched his first fully Bahasa Melayu album, titled Harapan in 2009, for which he gained the award for Best Engineered Album in the 16th Anugerah Industri Muzik held that year. This album, which was published exclusively on his own online record label R Records, consists of twelve tracks with a various mixture of Samba, Latin and many more Afro-Latin themes. This album featured collaborations with other homegrown names such as Noryn Aziz, Hunny Madu, Caprice, Adeep from Fabulous Cats and Mawar Berduri from Ahli Fiqir.

In 2010, Reshmonu released his first Tamil language single "Theendathey", which gained him popularity among Malaysia's Tamil community. Following the success of "Theendathey", Reshmonu followed suit with establishing vocal group ‘Ashtaka’ and a full-length LP titled Ashtaka that serviced the Indian music industry throughout 2012.

=== Entrepreneur ===
Reshmonu set up his own record label ‘R Records’; his own commercial recording studio called Shugar; and a video production house called Shpice to cater to artists/musicians/agencies who need audio/video production services. He then set up R Talents, which he is currently managing himself as well as artists such as sports announcer Roshan (Football Overload), TV host and radio personality Phat Fabes, Ashtaka, Beauty Queen, Nigerian rapper King Stunna and DJ Nadine Ann Thomas and indie singer-songwriter, Ain Zulkifly.

=== 2015: Re-branding as Resh ===
In July 2015, he rebranded himself as "Resh", complete with a new image. Resh cites that the name Reshmonu is a part of "coming-of-age" process. He collaborated with Timbaland's protege Jim Beanz of Sunset Entertainment Group to produce his new EP "Who Am I". The album features six tracks and the first single of the album; "Half The Man" was released in October 2015. The track shot to No. 1 on Hitz FM's Malaysian English Top 10 (or MET10) charts within its first week of release.

== Discography ==
Monumental

- Released: 2003
- Label: Dhanosh Records (Independent)
- Singles: "Walk Away", "It's You That Matters", "Cintaku Pergi", "Like This"

Monumental: the Journey Continues

- Released: 2005
- Label: Sony BMG
- Singles: "Hey Waley", "Kiranya Tiada Lagi"

Superfine

- Released: 2007
- Label: Universal Music
- Singles: "Understand", "Superfine", "The Way It Makes You Move"

Harapan

- Released: 2009
- Label: R Records
- Singles: "Oh Anok Anok"

Who Am I

- Released: 2015
- Label: Universal Music
- Singles: "Half The Man"

== Filmography ==
=== Film ===
Year	Title	Role
2011	Nasi Lemak 2.0	Hero Resh
2012	Hantu Gangster	Arulkumar (Young)

=== Television ===
Year	Title	Role	TV channel
2022	The Masked Singer Malaysia (season 2)	Participant as Periuk Kera	Astro Warna

== Accolades ==
=== Raaga Radio Awards ===
The awards show is organised by radio station THR Raaga.

- Nominated for Most Popular Artiste at the Raaga Radio Awards held at Stadium Putra on 9 October 2010.

=== Anugerah Planet Muzik ===
- Nominated for Best Artiste Award at the Anugerah Planet Muzik Awards 2009, held in Jakarta on 18 July 2009.

=== Anugerah Industri Muzik ===
- Awarded Best Engineered Album for Harapan at the 16th Anugerah Industri Muzik Awards Malaysia 2009, held at The Putra World Trade Centre on 2 May 2009.
- Nominated for Best Music Video Awards for "Oh Anok-Anok" at the 16th Anugerah Industri Muzik Awards Malaysia 2009, held at The Putra World Trade Centre on 2 May 2009.
- Nominated for Best Pop Album Awards for Harapan at the 16th Anugerah Industri Muzik Awards Malaysia 2009, held at The Putra World Trade Centre on 2 May 2009.
- Nominated for Best Male Vocal in A Song for "Doa Untuk Dia" at the 16th Anugerah Industri Muzik Awards Malaysia 2009, held at The Putra World Trade Centre on 2 May 2009.
- Nominated for Best Male Vocal in A Song for "Sayu" at the 16th Anugerah Industri Muzik Awards Malaysia 2009, held at The Putra World Trade Centre on 2 May 2009.
- Nominated for Best Engineered Album Awards for Harapan at the 16th Anugerah Industri Muzik Awards Malaysia 2009, held at The Putra World Trade Centre on 2 May 2009.
- Nominated for Best Music Video Awards for "The Way It Makes You Move" at the 15th Anugerah Industri Muzik Awards Malaysia 2008, held at The Putra World Trade Centre on 3 May 2008.
- Awarded Best Male Vocalist Award for the Superfine LP at the 14th Anugerah Industri Muzik Awards Malaysia 2007, held at The Putra World Trade Centre on 28 April 2007.
- Nominated for Best Male Vocalist, Best Local English Album and Best Album Cover Awards for Superfine at the 14th Anugerah Industri Muzik Awards Malaysia 2007, held at The Putra World Trade Centre on 28 April 2007.
- Nominated for Best Male Vocalist, Best Local English Album and Best Album Cover Awards for Superfine at the 14th Anugerah Industri Muzik Awards Malaysia 2007, held at The Putra World Trade Centre on 28 April 2007.
- Awarded Best Vocal Performance in an Album (Male) Award for Monumental at the 11th Anugerah Industri Muzik Awards Malaysia 2004, held at The Putra World Trade Centre on 24 April 2004.
- Awarded Best New Local English Artiste Award for Monumental at the 11th Anugerah Industri Muzik Awards Malaysia 2004, held at The Putra World Trade Centre on 24 April 2004.
- Awarded Best Engineered Album for Monumental at the 11th Anugerah Industri Muzik Awards Malaysia 2004, held at The Putra World Trade Centre on 24 April 2004.
- Nominated for Best Vocal Performance in an Album (Male) Award, Best New English Artist; Best Local English Album; Best Engineered Album, Best Music Video (two nominations) and Best Album Cover Awards for Monumental at the 11th Anugerah Industri Muzik Awards Malaysia 2004, held at The Putra World Trade Centre on 24 April 2004.

=== Hitz.fm Malaysian Top Ten Awards ===
- Nominated for Best Live Act Award category in the Hitz.fm Malaysian Top Ten Awards 2006.
- Won Best Pop/Dance Award 2005 Hitz FM Malaysian English Top 10 Awards 2005 for "It's You That Matters".
- Also nominated in Best Pop/Dance Award category for "Like This" in the Hitz.fm Malaysian Top Ten Awards 2005.
- Also nominated in the Best Urban Award category for ‘Walkaway’ in the Hitz.fm Malaysian Top Ten Awards 2005.
- Won the following two Best Music Video Awards 2005 at the 10th Malaysian Video Awards 2005 for Monumental -The Journey Continues: Silver Award for "Kiranya Tiada Lagi" and Bronze Award for "Hey Waley".

=== Malaysian Video Awards ===
- Won the following two Best Music Video Awards 2005 at the 10th Malaysian Video Awards 2005 for Monumental - The Journey Continues.
- Finalist for Best Music Video Award for "Like This" Music Video at the 9th Malaysian Video Awards [MVA] held on 17 September 2004 at Budaba Kuala Lumpur.
- Awarded "gold" for "Walk Away (Slow Jam Jam)" Music Video at the 8th Malaysian Video Awards held at Orange Club on 12 September 2003.
- Awarded joint "silver" for "Cintaku Pergi" Music Video at the 8th Malaysian Video Awards [MVA] held on 12 September 2003.

=== Anugerah Era ===
- Nominated for "Artist Inggeris Tempatan Terbaik" (Best English Artist) at Anugerah Era 2005.
- Nominated for "Artist Inggeris Tempatan Terbaik" (Best English Artist) at Anugerah Era 2004.
- Nominated for "Artist Inggeris Tempatan Terbaik" (Best English Artist) at Anugerah Era 2003.

=== Anugerah Juara Lagu ===
- Nominated For TV3 Juara Lagu 2004 Award for "Cintaku Pergi" music video.

=== Other awards ===
- Nominated as best dressed celebrity at the ‘MIFA 2004’ Malaysian International Fashion Awards

== Other activities ==
- 2004 – 2005 ‘Hotlink’ ambassador
- 2005 – 2006 Celebrity partner for United Nations’ UNDP SGP PTF
- 2008 – Donates his Winnings of RM 38,000.00 on the popular TV show Deal or No Deal towards a charitable Soup Kitchen; producer & voice behind NTV7's anniversary campaign song; one of the many artiste involved in MAFU (Malaysian Artiste for Unity) song titled ‘Here in My Home’
- 2004 to 2012 – Celebrity Model for Designers Daniel Cho of KWAN, Key Ng and Bon Zainal for M.I.F.A (Malaysian International Fashion Awards)
- 2009 – WWF's Earth Hour Ambassador; involved in the latest Kementerian Belia Dan Sukan Campaign Theme Song and Music Video
- 2010 to 2012 – Involved in PEMANDU's campaign for Government Transformation Program
- 2012 – Perform for King's Coronation at Dataran Merdeka
