= Nasi Lemak 1.0 =

2022 Malaysian comedy film

- Chinese: 辣死你妈传人
- Directed by: Namewee
- Starring: Namewee; Karen Kong; AC Mizal; Yumi Wong; Saiful Apek; Delimawati; Wak Doyok; Sanjna Suri; Yassin Yahya; Vikar; David Arumugam; Dennis Lau
- Production companies: Namewee Studio Production; Cumdy Cumdy Production
- Distributed by: MIG Beats Sdn Bhd
- Release date: 27 January 2022
- Running time: 111 minutes
- Country: Malaysia
- Languages: Mandarin; Malay; Tamil; Hokkien; English
- Box office: MYR 2.4 million at the local box office during two weeks of release.

Nasi Lemak 1.0 (Chinese: 辣死你妈传人) is a 2022 Malaysian comedy film by Namewee. A sequel to 2011 film Nasi Lemak 2.0, it tells the story of Chef Huang who accidentally travels back in time to the glorious Malacca Kingdom 600 years ago, where he caught up between the battle of pirates.

It is released on 27 January 2022 in Malaysia and Singapore. It is one of the five 2022 Malaysian and Singaporean Chinese New Year films, including Kongsi Raya and Small Town Heroes (Malaysia), Ah Girls Go Army and Reunion Dinner (Singapore).

== Synopsis ==
After the events of Nasi Lemak 2.0, Chef Huang's restaurant is having another slump in business, due to being too slow to serve food. A new restaurant is opened by his all-time nemesis Lan Qiao across the street. Chef Huang challenges him and once again hold a cooking competition to see who makes the best Nasi Lemak. During the intense competition, an explosion accident causes Chef Huang and the others to travel back in time and find themselves in the Malacca Sultanate 600 years ago, where nasi lemak is still not available and pirates are rampant, while the fleet of Cheng Ho is approaching. Caught in between the historical conflicts that will happen, now they must embark on the journey, how will their story go?

== Cast ==
- Namewee as Chef Huang Da Xia
- Karen Kong as Kong Xiao K
- AC Mizal as Sultan Melaka
- Yumi Wong as Xiao Long Nu 小龙女
- Saiful Apek as Head of Pirate
- Delimawati as Village Chief
- Wak Doyok as Minister of Melaka
- Sanjna Suri as Hasina / Curry Master's daughter in present day
- Yassin Senario as Head of Orang Asli
- Vikar as Vikar (威卡)
- Bean (密史得賓) as Ah Bean (阿賓)
- Bao (發财寶) as Zheng He / 大耳窿
- Zence (一正) as The Big Mole Man (黑痣人)
- Craze (神導) as The Head Shaker (搖頭人)
- David Arumugam as Curry Master
- Dennis Lau as Lan Qiao
- Zhu You Liu as Kong Xi Fa, Xiao K's father
- Choo Ah Tan as Kong Xi Ning, Xiao K's aunt
- Chong Sau Lin as Street Cleaner
- Leng Yein (林雲) as herself
- Leng Sean (林仙) as herself
- Jinnyboy as himself
- Cody Hong (方志勇) as himself
- Lizz Chloe (彤彤) as herself

== Release ==
The film is written and directed by Namewee. It is the sequel to the 2011 Malaysian film Nasi Lemak 2.0 after 11 years. Filming is completed in 2019. Almost all the multiethnic cast of Nasi Lemak 2.0 return and reprise their roles, and there are several new additions to the cast.

== Reception ==
=== Box-office ===
The film emerged as the top non-Hollywood film in Malaysia over the Chinese New Year period, taking an estimated RM 2.4 million at the local box office during two weeks of release.

=== Critical response ===
The film receives mixed to negative reviews.
