= Loganathan Arumugam =

Malaysian singer

Yang Berbahagia Dato' Loganathan Arumugam DIMP
- Birth name: Loganathan Arumugam
- Also known as: Loga
- Born: 15 July 1953
- Origin: Malaysia
- Died: 4 June 2007 (aged 53)
- Occupation(s): Musician, singer
- Instrument(s): Vocals, percussion, tambourine
- Years active: 1969–2007

Dato’ Loganathan Arumugam (15 July 1953 – 4 June 2007), better known as Loga, was a Malaysian musician and singer who was one of the founding members of the band Alleycats. Loga was one of the lead singers of Alleycats along with his elder brother David. Dato Loganathan Arumugam died from lung cancer at the Mount Miriam Hospital on 4 June 2007. He left behind 2 children, Vigneshwaran Loganathan and Priyadashini Loganathan, and his wife, Susan Lovie. Datuk Loganathan Arumugam was conferred the Darjah Indera Mahkota Pahang (DIMP) award which carries the title of "Dato" in conjunction with Sultan Ahmad Shah of Pahang's 78th birthday on 24 October 2008.

== Honour ==
- Pahang
  - Knight Companion of the Order of the Crown of Pahang (DIMP) – Dato' (2008)
