= Hridoy Jurey =

- Poster
- Directed by: Rafique Sikder
- Written by: Rafique Sikder
- Produced by: Monir Hossain Juboraj
- Starring: Nirab Hossain; Priyanka Sarkar; Nusrat Jahan Papiya; Monir Hossain Juboraj; Kazi Hayat
- Cinematography: Mithu Monir
- Edited by: Md Sohidul Haque
- Music by: Belal Khan
- Production company: Creative Media World
- Distributed by: Creative Media World; Live Technologies Ltd
- Release date: 28 February 2020
- Country: Bangladesh
- Language: Bengali

Hridoy Jurey is a 2020 Bangladeshi romantic drama film written and directed by Rafique Sikder and produced by Monir Hossain Juboraj with the production company of Creative Media World. It stars Nirab Hossain, Priyanka Sarkar, Monir Hossain Juboraj, Subrata Barua, Saif Chandan, Don, Kazi Hayat, Rina Khan and others. It mark debut Bangladeshi film of Indian film actress Priyanka Sarkar.

At the 45th Bangladesh National Film Awards for the year 2020, Belal Khan won the Best Music Director award for composing the song "Bishshash Jodi Jayre" for the film. The film marked the debut of Monir Hossain alias Juboraj as the main antagonist and receiving a mixed audience response across theaters, the feature provided Juboraj his entry into mainstream Bangladeshi cinema as a villain.

== Cast ==
- Nirab Hossain as Amit
- Priyanka Sarkar
- Monir Hossain Juboraj
- Subrata Barua
- Saif Chandan
- Don
- Kazi Hayat
- Rebecca Rauf
- Rina Khan

== Release ==
The film was released in theaters on 28 February 2020. Despite initial reports suggesting a release across nearly 50 theaters nationwide, director Rafiq Sikder confirmed that the film opened in 20 movie theaters, including six in Dhaka such as Jamuna Blockbuster Cinemas, Modhumita, Chitra Mahal, Purabi, and Anand.

== Reception ==
Fahim Muntasir of Bangla Movie Database gave the film a negative assessment, citing a weak plot and poor execution and criticized its predictable narrative, slow pacing, and flat character development, while noting that underwhelming editing and cinematography failed to engage the audience. A critic of Desh Rupantor noted, the film received positive feedback from critics and audiences, with its promotional content and family-friendly narrative drawing strong turnout at Dhaka theaters. Viewers particularly praised the storyline and Nirab's lead performance, with director Rafique Sikder expressing satisfaction over the film's warm reception. The film received an uncut clearance certificate from the Bangladesh Film Censor Board on 7 January 2020. Censor board members praised the film for its original romantic storyline and engaging climactic sequences.

== Accolades ==
Award	Category	Recipient	Result	Ref.
45th Bangladesh National Film Awards	Best Music Director	Belal Khan	Won	
CJFB Performance Award	Best Film Actor	Nirab Hossain	Nominated	
