= Hantu Gangster =

- Hantu Gangster released poster.
- Directed by: Namewee
- Written by: Namewee
- Produced by: Fred Chong; Ong Hung Heng; Tedy Tow
- Starring: Namewee; Farid Kamil; Diana Danielle; Jalaluddin Hassan; David Arumugam; Reshmonu; Amber Chia
- Music by: Lee Nai Kong; Soon Seng
- Production company: UB Prodigee Entertainment
- Release date: 9 August 2012
- Running time: 90 minutes
- Country: Malaysia
- Languages: Malay; Mandarin; English; Tamil
- Box office: MYR3.45 million

Hantu Gangster is a 2012 Malaysian horror comedy film directed by Namewee. The film stars Namewee, Amber Chia, Farid Kamil, Diana Danielle, Dato Jalaluddin Hassan, David Arumugam, Reshmonu and others.

== Plot ==
In a small town in Klang, a rogue named Te Sai (played by Namewee) steals a ring during a gangster's memorial ceremony, unaware that it is haunted. The ring contains the spirits of three former gang leaders, who begin to haunt Te Sai as he carries it. He soon discovers that the trio was killed by a traitor whose personal agenda threatens the very foundation of unity among the three gangs. Guided by the ghosts, Te Sai must do everything he can to unify the gangs and prevent a tragedy that could result in the deaths of many innocents.

== Cast ==
- Namewee as Te Sai
- Farid Kamil as Ewan
- Diana Danielle as Jameela
- Jalaluddin Hassan as Bang Nasir
- David Arumugam as Arulkumar
- Charlie Loke Wing Kai as Ah Hua
- Taiyuddin Bakar as Parut
- Abu Bakar Siddiq as Seelan
- Bao as Ah Bao
- Noh Hujan as Bang Nasir (young)
- Reshmonu as Arulkumar (young)
- Dennis Lau as Ah Hua (young)
- Amber Chia as Angel of Death
- Mizz Nina as Bang Nasir's wife
- Reneetha as Arulkumar's wife (young)
- Lim Ching Miau as Ah Hua's wife
- Sasitharan Rajoo as Police A
- Tee Jing Chen as Chee Meng, Te Sai's son
- Teacher Hew as Divine Protector - Iron Butt
- Bean as Divine Protector - Iron Bird
- Zence as Divine Protector - Iron Head
- Craze as Divine Protector - Iron Face / The Head Shaker
