= Nasi Lemak 2.0 =

2011 Malaysian comedy film

- Film poster
- Directed by: Namewee
- Produced by: Fred Chong; Sylvia Lim
- Starring: Namewee; Karen Kong; Adibah Noor; Afdlin Shauki; David Arumugam; Reshmonu; Kenny & CHEE; Eiza Idanie
- Production company: Prodigee Media Sdn Bhd
- Distributed by: Grand Brilliance
- Release date: 8 September 2011
- Running time: 108 minutes
- Country: Malaysia
- Languages: Mandarin; Cantonese; Hokkien; Hainan; Malay; Tamil; English
- Budget: lower than MYR1 mil.
- Box office: MYR7 Million

Nasi Lemak 2.0 (Chinese: 辣死你媽 2.0) is a Malaysian comedy film directed by and starring rapper Wee Meng Chee, known more by his stage name Namewee. The sequel, Nasi Lemak 1.0 was released 11 years later on 27 January 2022.

The low-budget film premiered in Melbourne, Australia, on the 31st of August, also known as Malaysia's National Day, then later to Malaysian cinemas on 8 September 2011.

== Plot ==
A young chef, Huang Da Xia struggles to get the patrons he is looking for. However, contradicting his unpopular cuisine, he is also well known as "Hero Huang" in the local neighbourhood, because he carries out good deeds in helping the community, including filming videos and putting them on his YouTube account. One day, he meets Xiao K, who asks for his help. Xiao K's father, owner of a famous Chinese restaurant, is fighting with her aunt for the ownership of the restaurant. After some complicated discussions, they decide to hold a contest to see who can cook the best Chinese dish. Desperate to get his life and the restaurant business back on track, Chef Huang decides to help Xiao K. Huang seeks help from a mysterious hawker stall lady, who summons him to embark on an extraordinary journey of his life. During this self-enlightening experience, he will also meet many "local heroes", each lending their support to help him rediscover his roots and the real hidden message of "Nasi Lemak".

== Cast ==
- Namewee as Chef Huang Da Xia
- Karen Kong as Kong Xiao K
- Adibah Noor as Kak Nor
- David Arumugam as Curry Master
- Ho Yu Hang as Chef Huang's Guru
- Afdlin Shauki as Fisherman
- Kenny Chan as Nyonya
- Chee Hood Siong as Baba
- Dennis Lau as Lan Qiao
- Zhu You Liu as Kong Xi Fa, Xiao K's father
- Choo Ah Tan as Kong Xi Ning, Xiao K's aunt
- Reshmonu as Hang Tuah (漢都亞) Hàn dōu yà / Ice Cream's Driver
- Theng Sizw Hang as Zheng He
- Nadine Ann Thomas as Curry Daughter
- Pak Habib as Curry Master's Friend
- Nur Fathia as Fisherman 2nd Wife
- Eiza Idanie as Fisherman 1st Wife
- Pete Teo as Gangster Leader
- Patrick Teoh as Judge
- Tee Jing Chen as Huang Da Xia (young)
- Teacher Hew (丘老师 (德财)) as Ah Dong
- Bean (密史得賓) as Ah Bean (阿賓)
- Bao (發财寶) as Chef Hero
- Zence (一正) as The Big Mole Man (黑痣人)
- Craze (神導) as The Head Shaker (搖頭人)

== Development ==
On 17 March 2010, Wee announced at a small media event that he was going to make a movie. He applied for funds from the Malaysian government, which he recorded on film. After multiple unsuccessful attempts, he vowed to meet the Prime Minister of Malaysia, Najib Razak. Wee met the Prime Minister of Malaysia about producing the film, stressing to him that the movie promoted the spirit of Najib's 1Malaysia program.

The film's executive producer, Fred Chong, said that the movie had the full support from Minister Datuk Seri Nazri Aziz, a member of the Prime Minister's office, who had issued an official letter endorsing it as a "1Malaysia film". However, protesters objected to the film and its maker, which prompted Wee to post on his Facebook page about his concerns that the movie would be banned in Malaysia.

Wee spent nearly a year applying for loans so film production would commence, but his applications were rejected. Nevertheless, under a low budget and under the absence of government funding, he continued on his film which took about two months including post-editing. The film was then handed over to the National Censorship Board.

On 10 October, the National Film Development Corporation Malaysia (Finas) declared that the movie is not entitled to a 20% tax rebate under its new incentive for local films, because it did not qualify for mandatory screening status.

On 26 June 2011, Wee announced that the movie would be in theatres on 8 September. Soon after, the trailer was released on his YouTube channel.

== Reception ==
2.0 is the first film in Malaysia to portray the country's three major races in an ensemble manner. The response was mixed. This is the first Malaysian film that did not target one of the three population groups as its audience. A survey conducted by major bloggers and entertainment tabloids claimed that most of its audience loved the style of acting, because they could relate to the characters.

=== Box-office ===
In an interview with AFP, co-producer Fred Chong said that the movie made more than MYR1.5 million during the first four days of release.

=== Controversy ===
There was little protest done against the movie's screening, one occasion that took place in Ipoh was done by a group who called themselves the Pertubuhan Gagasan Rakyat Didahulukan Negeri Perak (The Perak People First Alliance Society).

On 21 September 2011, an Utusan Malaysia article had condemned Namewee for the film which was claimed to have insulted the national anthem Negaraku, Islam and Malay race as a whole. Namewee responded that the author had passed judgement on his movie without looking at it as a whole, for misunderstanding it and for missing its intent to unify the races across Malaysia. Namewee's response led some protesters to push for Utusan Malaysia to lodge an official police report against him.

== See also ==
- Nasi lemak
