= Namewee =

Malaysian musician (born 1983)

- 黄明志
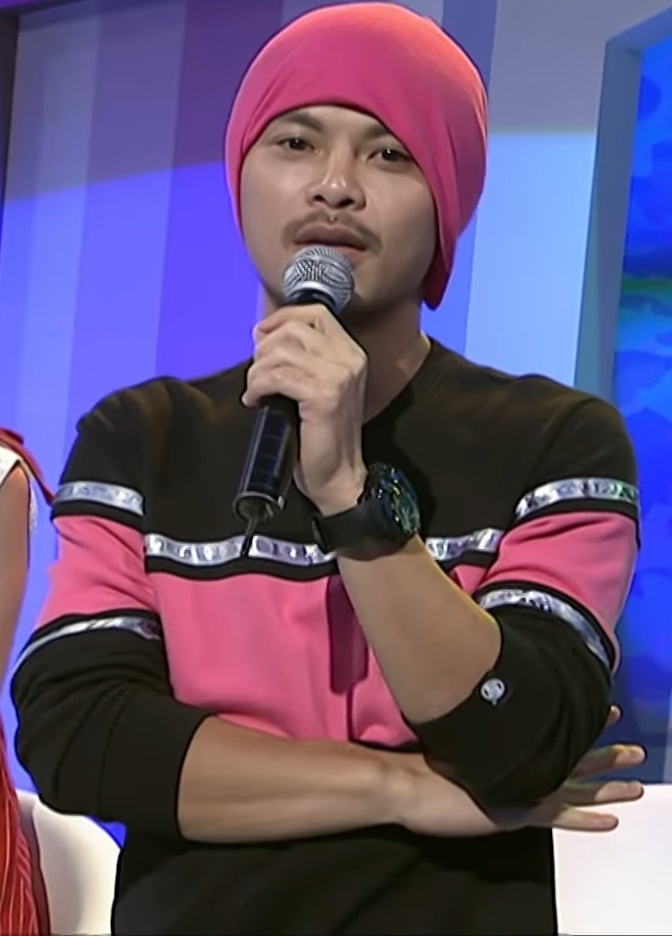
- Wee performing in Taiwan, 2016
- Born: Wee Meng Chee; 6 May 1983 (age 43); Muar, Johor, Malaysia
- Education: Ming Chuan University
- Occupations: Rapper; singer; songwriter; composer; filmmaker; actor
- Years active: 2007 - present
- Partner: Sarah (2010 - present)
- Parents: Wee Ann Hee (father); Kwang Fang (mother)
- Musical career
- Genres: Eurodance; hip hop; reggaeton; C-pop
- Instruments: Vocals; guitar

YouTube information
- Channel: Namewee
- Years active: 2006 - present
- Subscribers: 3.63 million
- Views: 1.89 billion
- Last updated: 9 April 2026

Wee Meng Chee
- Traditional Chinese: 黃明志
- Simplified Chinese: 黄明志
Transcriptions
Standard Mandarin
- Hanyu Pinyin: Huáng Míngzhì
Southern Min
- Hokkien POJ: Ûiⁿ Bêng-chì

Namewee
- Chinese: 明志
Transcriptions
Standard Mandarin
- Hanyu Pinyin: Míngzhì
Southern Min
- Hokkien POJ: Bêng-chì
- Website: namewee.com

Wee Meng Chee (Chinese: 黃明志; pinyin: Huáng Míngzhì; Pe̍h-ōe-jī: Ûiⁿ Bêng-chì; born 6 May 1983), better known by his stage name Namewee (/ˈneɪmwiː/), is a Malaysian hip hop recording artist, composer, filmmaker and actor. His stage name is a bilingual pun on his given name, which in Mandarin is nearly homophonous with the word for "name" (Chinese: 名字; pinyin: míngzi).

Wee gained popularity after releasing a controversial song titled "Negarakuku", a remake of the national anthem of Malaysia, "Negaraku". The word kuku resembles the word for 'penis' in Hokkien. In the weeks following the song's release, it drew criticism from Malaysian society. Despite the controversy surrounding "Negarakuku", Wee released his first, self-titled EP, Namewee (Chinese: 明志), in Malaysia on 3 September 2007. The album was completed in May and does not contain "Negarakuku".

In early 2010, he released his first film titled Nasi Lemak 2.0. Subsequently, he released Hantu Gangster and Kara King, which were released in 2012 and 2013, respectively. He also started a talk show series on YouTube, Namewee Tokok, in September 2012. He was nominated for the Best Male Vocal Mandarin award at the Golden Melody Award in 2016 and 2017. In August 2016, he was arrested by police for filming a music video, featuring performers dressed as religious leaders going about a church, a mosque and a Chinese temple, which allegedly insulted the dignity of Islam.

Namewee is a controversial figure in Malaysian Chinese music. He first gained mainstream popularity with his song "You're Not Red" (Chinese: 你不紅). In subsequent years, several other songs also gained attention outside Malaysia, such as "Thai Love Song" (Chinese: 泰國情哥), "High Pitch" (Chinese: 飆高音) "Stranger in the North" (Chinese: 漂向北方) and "Tokyo Bon 2020" (Japanese: 東京盆踊り2020). Currently, over 125 of his tracks (including those which have been removed from his YouTube channel) have over 1 million views, with "Stranger In The North" among the most-viewed Chinese music video on YouTube.

Wee has since been banned in Mainland China as a result of the song and music video "Fragile" (Chinese: 玻璃心), a collaboration with Taiwan-based Australian singer Kimberley Chen which went viral in October 2021, to sarcast Little Pink.

== Early life ==
Born and raised up in the town of Muar, Johor, Malaysia, Wee was educated in SRJK Chung Hwa 1B and Chung Hwa High School.

While in secondary school, he wrote his first 400 songs. Around the same time, Wee and a few good friends formed a band named Aunt Band (Chinese: 大娘乐队) and won several competitions. He had also released several songs, along with complementary music videos on YouTube, which include Muar's Mandarin (Chinese: 麻坡的华语) and Kawanku (Malay for 'My friends'), the latter sparking controversy being mistook by many as a song targeting Malaysian Chinese, Malays and Singaporeans.

Wee went to Taiwan for higher education, a common destination for ethnic Chinese who cannot enter Malaysian universities due to educational and racial policies. He studied mass communication as an undergraduate at Ming Chuan University in Taoyuan between 2002 and 2006.

== Career ==
In 2006 Namewee released his debut song, "Muar Mandarin".

In 2007, Namewee's video "Negarakuku" was released and quickly went viral, gaining 40,000 views in a month. The song, a parody of the Malaysian national anthem "Negaraku" (punning on the Hokkien profanity "kuku", meaning penis) sparked controversy over its irreverent lyrics about the country's politics, which some deemed as mocking the government, ethnic Malays and Islam. However, Namewee and others challenged this view, stating that the song was meant to comment on the facets of Malaysian life in a satirical way and not to insult anyone. Then-culture minister Rais Yatim asked Namewee to publicly apologize, and he was questioned a year later when he returned to Malaysia after graduation.

A small controversy erupted when a three-part video Teacher Hew's ABC Time (Chinese: 邱老師 ABC 時間), directed by Wee was released. In the video, a close friend of Wee, known as teacher Hew, introduces the English alphabet from an adult-oriented perspective. It soon became notorious from its heavy use of profanity as well as orgasm sounds, and the board of directors of Chung Hwa High School decided to sue Wee, as the video was filmed in the school compound, but the lawsuit was later dropped.

In July 2009, Namewee composed the theme and ending songs for Singaporean film Where Got Ghost? which was released on 13 August 2009.

He acted as the principal cast in Potong Saga and as the supporting cast in Meter.

Namewee also made a video clip in the late of October 2009, titled Namewee fuck TNB. In the video, Namewee's house and Muar suffer a blackout at night, but the local TNB (Tenaga Nasional Berhad) branch office remains lit, while his brother is sitting for the examinations the following day, so Wee goes to TNB to look for answers, but the ensuing quarrel leads the security guards to escort him out of the facility. After that, Wee scolds TNB with a slur and tells them to 'go back to sleep'. The ending song is dedicated to attacking TNB, parodically insulting 'TNB' ('Tenaga Nasional Berhad') as "Tiu Nia Bu", an offensive phrase in Hokkien.

In May 2010, Wee made a music video Handicap Goal, featuring himself and his friends, including teacher Hew, to celebrate the 2010 FIFA World Cup by playing football with women.

On 26 August 2010, Wee made a music video titled Nah! 2010 posting on YouTube criticising a school principal in Kulai, who was reported to have made racist remarks during a school assembly on 12 August 2010. The clip contained obscene language condemning the school principal and the Education Ministry. However, Wee was asked to give a statement in Kuala Lumpur police station and also Cyberjaya Investigation Unit for two times later.

In September 2010, he published another video I Am Who I Am (Chinese: 我還是我), depicting his past experiences and determination to pursue his dream with no return despite having obstacles.

In October 2010, Namewee was officially invited to attend the Busan International Film Festival in South Korea.

Wee released his first film Nasi Lemak 2.0—which he starred in and directed—in September 2011. The movie gained major success in Malaysia, grossing over RM7 million.

In September 2011, a public service announcement video titled Undilah, encouraging Malaysian citizens to vote, was released by Pete Teo. Namewee composed part of the music and rap lyrics as well as appearing in the video, featuring various other local celebrities and politicians.

He starred in Petaling Street Warriors, which was released in December 2011.

After the success of Nasi Lemak 2.0 and Petaling Street Warriors, Namewee started off with his another directorial work, Hantu Gangster. The film was filmed in Klang and was released on 9 August 2012.

Namewee uploaded a video about Lynas, and talked about Australian and Kangaroo in the video, on 28 February 2012.

On 25 September 2012, he officially launched an online talk show entitled Namewee Tokok, hoping through this program, the Malaysian could have a different perspective on viewing various issues and news in Malaysia as the mass media of the country was consolidated by the government.

In 2014, Namewee established RED People, a group of Internet personnel, and was also involved in composing Joyce Chu's song Malaysia Chabor.

Namewee featured Wang Leehom in a song titled "Stranger in the North" (Chinese: 漂向北方), which was released on YouTube on 4 March 2017. As of 30 September 2018, the video has garnered more than 135 million views, the highest that Wee has ever achieved in producing and composing the song. It describes the life of migrant workers in Beijing, and is also a reflection of his personal journey in making a name for himself in Taiwan when he started out.

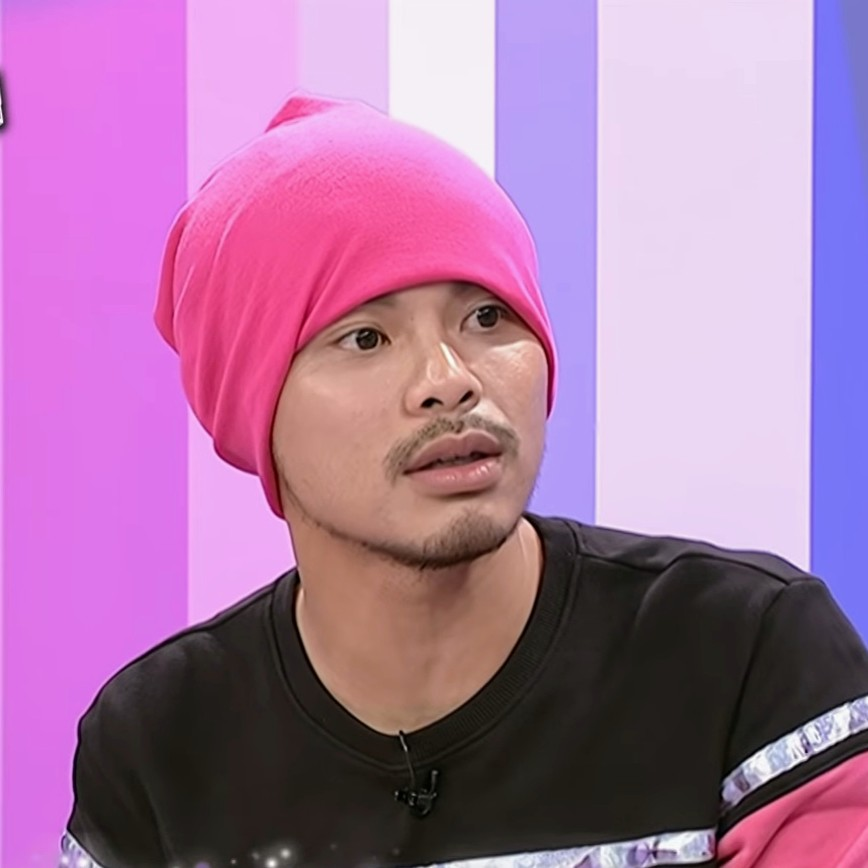
Namewee in 2016

On 22 April 2017, Namewee uploaded a song on YouTube named "18X PAPAPA" (Chinese: 18X禁歌啪啪啪), reaching more than 8 million views in 2 months and becoming the 2nd most popular song to the group of 7–12 years old students according to research. Namewee's fans commented that although the song was only for 18+, they enjoyed it and kept replaying the song.

To remember the 10th anniversary on 20 May 2017 since he started uploading his songs on YouTube, Namewee released a music video titled Muar Mandarin 2017 Official MV (Chinese: 麻坡的華語10週年紀念版), featuring various places including the Wetex, 8th avenue, etc., in his birthplace Muar, a city in Johor, Malaysia. It was an instant hit, reaching more than one million views on YouTube in one month.

On 21 October 2017, he released another music video with the same title Stranger in the North, a KTV version featuring Hong Kong singer-songwriter and actress G.E.M. It has also received widespread popularity and amassed over 25 million views by end of September 2018.

On 17 March 2018, he published another music video with the title Rain In Ho Chi Minh featuring Vietnam singer-songwriter Hồ Quang Hiếu. In collaboration with the Department of Information and Tourism, Taipei City Government, Wee produced a video titled Fun Taipei Funny Ads on 25 August 2018, introducing viewers to Taipei travels and featuring Amoi-Amoi, a girl group composed of ET Wang from Taiwan, and May Ng, Stella Chen and Hong ShaoQi from Malaysia.

On 23 January 2020, Namewee released a single and music video titled China Reggaeton featuring Hong Kong actor Anthony Wong. In 2024, Namewee collaborated with Wong again for his single, 'Za Fit'.

In July 2020, Namewee debuted a music video of his song "Five Hundred" (Chinese: 五百), which is a rock song made in the style of and a tribute to Taiwanese Wu Bai (Chinese: 伍佰) and his band China Blue. While Wu Bai does not appear in the video, a group of impersonators portray him and the band China Blue.

Wee also featured Japanese actress and singer Meu Ninomiya (Japanese: 二宮芽生) in a song titled "Tokyo Bon 2020" (Japanese: 東京盆踊り2020), which was released on YouTube on 19 November 2017 and has garnered more than 30 million views in less than a year. Written and composed by Namewee in collaboration with Cool Japan TV, the video combines the elements of traditional Japanese instruments, Okinawa music style and Bon dance with foreign music, describing a clueless Asian tourist wandering on the streets of Tokyo and his amusing interaction with a Japanese high school girl who speaks Japanglish.

On 22 August 2021, Namewee published an article about the Taliban's eight suggestions for seizing the regime of Afghanistan on Weibo. As a result, he was insulted by Chinese netizens resulted in his Weibo account was blocked and he became the first Malaysian artist who was blocked by China. In October, Namewee's "Fragile" (Chinese: 玻璃心), collaborated with Taiwan-based Australian singer Kimberley Chen, garnered over 10 million YouTube views in six days since upload. The song satirizes the social issues in China, the political status of Taiwan, the Xinjiang re-education camps, censorship in China, as well as the Little Pinks' response. The singers were banned from Mainland China as a result.

In early April 2022, the YouTube channel which Namewee had maintained for some 13 years, and which had over 3 million subscribers was hacked, with its contents cleared and its title replaced by profanities in Russian. He was later able to retrieve some of the content.

== Artistic style ==
Namewee's work commonly touches on themes of multiculturalism and multiracialism, Malaysian identity and issues, and Sinosphere/Sinophone cultural experiences. His music often stirs controversy by focusing on and satirising sensitive topics in society and politics, leading to multiple legal problems for him in Malaysia.

His debut song, "Muar Mandarin" (2006), advocates for pride in his hometown's non-standard mixed culture, such as its unique dialect of Mandarin Chinese.

== Legal issues ==
On 2 August 2016, it was reported that Penang police were planning to arrest him as soon as he returned from a trip abroad over a potential charge stemmed from his controversial music video Oh my God that allegedly insulted Islam. Prior to his detention, Namewee published a video on YouTube on 21 August 2016 titled Surrender, depicting himself stripping naked (with his genitals censored) to show that he has no visible or existing injuries prior to his detention.

As planned, police detained him upon his arrival at Kuala Lumpur International Airport on 21 August 2016 and remanded him in the following day after the magistrates' court granted a remand order for four days to investigate the case under Section 295 of the Penal Code for injuring or defiling a place of worship with intent to insult the religion. On 25 August 2016, Namewee was freed on bail after the magistrates' court had refused to extend his arrest in view of his suffering from stomach ulcers.

On 22 February 2018, Namewee was detained by police for a day to facilitate investigations on his music video Like a Dog, in which he and other individuals dance allegedly indecently in front of Perdana Putra, the office complex of the Prime Minister of Malaysia. Namewee released a video refuting charges made against him, principally that the dance video had been staged in front of a mosque.

On 12 March 2021, Namewee, who at that point had resided in Taipei for seven months, released a video saying he intended to return to Malaysia and predicted that he would be detained there, over a complaint stemming from racial tensions being depicted in his film Babi. On 15 March 2021, the Malay Mail reported that Namewee had been detained for two hours after passing immigration at Kuala Lumpur International Airport, and is due to surrender himself to police custody at their Bukit Aman headquarters after a seven-day quarantine.

=== The death of Iris Hsieh Yu-hsin ===
On 22 October 2025, Namewee was arrested and charged with drug offences after finding Taiwanese influencer Iris Hsieh Yu-hsin (謝侑芯) dead in a hotel bathtub where they were found together. According to Kuala Lumpur police chief Fadil Marsus, he was arrested when police searched a room and found pills believed to be ecstasy, and put him in remand for two days after he tested positive for multiple types of drugs before being released on bail. Namewee plead not guilty to the charges, publishing a social media post denying possession or usage of drugs and expressing sorrow over Hsieh's death. The case received heightened media attention in the first week of November after it was reported that Hsieh was going to be in a video with Namewee.

Her death was reclassified as murder from sudden death by the police on 4 November. After the reclassification, Namewee could not be located by the police initially, however he reported hours later at a Kuala Lumpur police station, having travelled from Johor. He was remanded for and initial six days to aid the investigation into Hsieh's death. The remand was extended for three more days. He was released on a police bail after investigations found no lead that showed his involvement in Hsieh's death.

In connection to the drug possession charge, Namewee was also initially charged with the use of drugs. However, he was acquitted on 22 December 2025 after an urine test indicated that he did not consume drugs and the prosecutor decided not to pursue the charge.

== Discography ==
=== Album ===
#	Title	Released	Production	Label	Track
1st	Ho Ho Yeah 好好嘢新歌+精選	21 September 2010	WebTVAsia	WebTVAsia	Tracks: 1. I AM WHO I AM (我還是我); 2. Snowing In KL(吉隆坡下雪); 3. Clap Hand (拍拍手); 4. No More Vulgar (不罵粗話); 5. I X You Because I Love You (我X你因為我愛你); 6. Handicap Goal (放半粒); 7. KL Girls Ho Ho Yeah (KL的查某好好野); 8. KL Girls - I'm Sorry (KL的查某對不起); 9. Good Brothers (好兄弟); 10. JB Song (新山真好); 11. Suukee Suukee; 12. Muar Love Song (麻坡的情歌); 13. Muar Mandarin (麻坡的華語)
2nd	Asia Most Wanted 亞洲通緝	2 February 2013	WebTVAsia	Warner Music Taiwan Ltd.	Tracks: 1. I AM WHO I AM (我還是我); 2. Kick Coming (Kick來料); 3. Thai Love Song (泰國情哥); 4. Nod Nod (低低頭); 5. We Are Nothing (四大皆空); 6. Snowing in KL(吉隆坡下雪); 7. We Are Gangster; 8. Good Brothers (咱是好兄弟); 9. Curry Neh (咖喱咧); 10. Suukee Suukee; 11. Muar Love Song (麻坡的情歌); 12. Rasa Sayang 2.0; 13. Last New Year (去年新年)
3rd	Asian Killer 亞洲通殺	7 July 2015	The Dow Culture and Creative Company	Avex Trax	Tracks: 1. Banglasia; 2. K-Pop Idol (全民偶像); 3. High Pitched (飆高音); 4. Trip To Taipei (台北之旅); 5. AV Star (AV女郎); 6. Uncle Lim I'm Coming (我來了Uncle Lim); 7. Thai Sad Song (泰傷情哥); 8. Aunty (安娣); 9. Learn Cantonese (學廣東話); 10. Lover (心愛的人)
4th	Cross Over Asia 亞洲通車	30 December 2016	The Dow Culture and Creative Company	Avex Trax	Tracks: 1. Chicken Year (那隻雞拜年（雞拜年）); 2. Stranger In The North (漂向北方); 3. Pretty Hurts (美人罪); 4. Sorry Boss (不想上班); 5. Mother (老母); 6. Oh My God; 7. Wake Up; 8. Little India; 9. I Miss U 2 (好想你 2.0); 10. Poor Love Song (負二代)
5th	All Eat Asia 亞洲通吃	30 December 2017	The Dow Culture and Creative Company	Avex Trax	Tracks: 1. Thai Cha Cha (泰國恰恰); 2. Tokyo Bon (東京盆踴); 3. Geebai People (擊敗人); 4. Rain In Ho Chi Minh (胡志明的雨); 5. Rain In Ho Chi Minh - Mandarin Ver. (胡志明的雨-單人中文版); 6. High Pitch Together (一起飆高音); 7. Ali AhKao Dan Muthu; 8. Dreams From My Father (爸爸的夢); 9. Funny Action (搞笑快行動); 10. One & Only (唯一的唯一的唯一); 11. PaPaPa (啪啪啪)
6th	Ultimatum to Asia 亞洲通牒	21 December 2018	Asian Tone Cultural and Creative Industry	Avex Trax	Tracks: 1. 4896; 2. Handbag or Abalone (買包包換鮑鮑); 3. Lovely Hainan Island (不到海南島); 4. Lokap (拘留所); 5. Cry Father (靠北); 6. My Skanky Girlfriend (怎麼辦); 7. Our Memes (一起做過的蠢事); 8. Malaysia Boleh; 9. Never Give Up (不想放開); 10. Sing Cantonese Song (唱廣東歌); 11. Mingalaba (閔閣拉巴); 12. Behind Me (在我背後); 13. Good Morning; 14. Muar Mandarin - 10th Anniversary Version (麻坡的華語-十週年紀念版)
7th	Calling Asia 亞洲通話	5 December 2019	Asian Tone Cultural and Creative Industry	Avex Trax	Tracks: 1. Ghost Island (鬼島); 2. The Stray - Solo Ver. (流浪狗 – 黃明志獨唱版本); 3. My Old Wound (舊傷口); 4. 10 Year Challenge (我們的十年); 5. Ain't A Cigarette (哥抽菸); 6. Gateway to Kaohsiung (出去走走); 7. Polyamory (愛妳也愛她); 8. Piggy Piggy; 9. Drunken Butterfly (醉蝶); 10. JioJioMe; 11. Yamabi (亞麻比)
8th	Asia Polymath 亞洲通才	1 December 2020	Asian Tone Cultural and Creative Industry	Avex Trax	Tracks: 1. China Reggaeton (中國痛); 2. Beyond The Edge (我們的海闊天空); 3. 10,000 Reasons To Make Me Happy (一萬個開心的理由); 4. Canon Rock 2020 (你是我的青春); 5. I Shot You (不小心); 6. The Great Wall (長城); 7. Stop Clubbing (不要去Club); 8. Five Hundred (五百); 9. Over Love Is Over (對妳愛完了); 10. Curry & Roti; 11. OK Lah!; 12. Frienemy (敵友)
9th	Ghosician 鬼才做音樂	11 January 2022	Asian Tone Cultural and Creative Industry	Avex Trax	Tracks: 1. Hello Hater; 2. Alzheimer's Love (老人癡愛); 3. Fragile (玻璃心); 4. Happy Family; 5. Return With A Smile (笑著回家); 6. You Know Who is My Father; 7. Like A Bull (金牛); 8. The Wall (牆外); 9. Film Like A Man (小鮮肉變男子漢); 10. My Old House (我成長的地方); 11. You Don't Know Me (你不認識我); 12. I Am A Cow (我是一隻牛); 13. Keep Going (走下去); 14. Single Dog (單身狗)
10th	High Definition & Uncensored 高清無碼	7 December 2022	Asian Tone Cultural and Creative Industry	Avex Trax	Tracks: 1. Encode Song (鎖碼歌); 2. Katak; 3. What I Love (我愛的); 4. 809000; 5. Be Like Him (像他一樣); 6. Low Key (低調); 7. Someone Else's Wife (別人的老婆); 8. The 20th Floor (二十樓); 9. Secret Live (偷偷); 10. Ya Gamila; 11. Nothing At All (如果我一無所有); 12. Hang Out & Play Now! (揪你出去玩)
11th	Weenomenon 我們都是黃明志	30 November 2023	Asian Tone Cultural and Creative Industry	Avex Trax	Tracks: 1. We Are Everyone (千千萬萬個我); 2. Ten Men (十個男人); 3. Step By Step (慢慢做起來); 4. Foggy Night (夜霧); 5. A Song For You (寫一首個給你聽); 6. BUKIT MAK; 7. DANNOK; 8. When I'm Gone (當我離開以後); 9. Big Bird Plane (大飛機)

=== EP ===
#	Title	Released	Production	Label	Track
1st	Namewee 明志	3 September 2007	WebTVAsia		Tracks: 1. Mama Said (媽媽說); 2. One Night Stand; 3. The King Of Pirate (盜版之王); 4. Poor Boy (可憐的小弟); 5. Muar Mandarin (麻坡的華語); 6. Cute Girls (Demo Ver.); 7. Poor Boy (Live Ver.); 8. Muar Mandarin (Live Ver.); 9. One Night Stand (Minus One); 10. Poor Boy (Minus One)

=== Live recording album ===
#	Title	Published	Production	Label	Track
1st	Namewee 4896 World Tour Live 黃明志4896世界巡迴演唱會Live全紀錄	27 March 2020 (On streaming services)	Asian Tone Cultural and Creative Industry		Tracks: 1. Geebai People (擊敗人); 2. Cry Father (靠北); 3. PaPaPa (啪啪啪); 4. High Pitched (飆高音); 5. Learn Cantonese (學廣東話); 6. Curry Neh & Rasa Sayang 2.0 (feat. Karen Kong); 7. Sing Cantonese (唱廣東歌) (feat. Candy Lo); 8. Funny Action (搞笑快行動) (feat. Jack Neo); 9. Never Give Up (不想放開) (feat. Boon Hui Lu); 10. High Pitched Together (一起飆高音) (feat. Fara Dolhadi); 11. Mother (老母) (feat. 王光芳); 12. Dreams From My Father 爸爸的夢 (feat. Wee Ann Hee); 13. Snowing In KL (吉隆坡下雪); 14. Stranger In The North (漂向北方) (feat. Boon Hui Lu); 15. Stranger In The North (漂向北方) (feat. Fara Dolhadi); 16. I AM WHO I AM (我還是我)

== Filmography ==
Year	Title	Role	Notes	Ref
2011	Nasi Lemak 2.0	Hero Huang (黃大俠)		
2011	Petaling Street Warriors	Liu Kun (劉坤)		
2012	Hantu Gangster	Te Sai (豬屎)		
2013	Kara King (冠軍歌王)	Bone (骨头)		
2014	Banglasia	Han-Guoren (韓國仁)		
2015	Kungfu Taboo			
2016	The Big Power (大顯神威)			
2017	Old Town Story			
2019	Friend Zone	Bellboy	Cameo role, Thai film	
2019	Missbehaviour			
2020	BABI (你是豬)			
2022	Nasi Lemak 1.0	Hero Huang		
2024	All In (撲克王者)	Huang Xiaoqi		

== Concert tours ==
- Namewee 4896 World Tour (2017–2019)
- Our Voices in... (2018–2019)
- Namewee Big Bird Tour (2023–?)

== See also ==
- Honorific nicknames in popular music
- Malaysian pop
- Music of Malaysia

== Bibliography ==
- Chan, Brenda (15 March 2021). "13: Language, Identities and Resistance: Comparing Two Ethnic Chinese Rappers from Malaysia and Singapore". In Hoon, Chang-Yau; Chan, Ying-kit (eds.). Contesting Chineseness: Ethnicity, Identity, and Nation in China and Southeast Asia. Springer Nature. pp. 239–261. ISBN 978-981-336-096-9.
- Tan, E. K. (12 October 2023). "5: Sinopop - The Case of Namewee / Wee Meng Chee". In Bachner, Andrea; Chiang, Howard; Lee, Yu-lin (eds.). Sinoglossia. Hong Kong University Press. pp. 91–109. ISBN 978-988-8805-71-6.
