= David Arumugam =

Malaysian musician

Yang Hormat Dato' David Arumugam DIMP JSM
- Born: Thiagarajan K.R. Arumugam; 3 May 1950 (age 75); Penang, Federation of Malaya (now Malaysia)
- Genres: Pop rock, funk, disco, adult contemporary
- Occupations: Musician, singer, lyricist, actor
- Instruments: Vocals, percussion
- Years active: 1969–present
- Label: Universal Music Group
- Member of: Alleycats

Thiagarajan K.R. Arumugam (born 3 May 1950), known by his stage name David Arumugam, is a Malaysian musician and singer who is one of the founding members of the band called Alleycats. He is the elder brother of Loganathan Arumugam. On 12 February 2009, David Arumugam was conferred the Darjah Indera Mahkota Pahang (DIMP) award which carries the title of " Dato' " in conjunction with the Sultan of Pahang's 78th birthday on 24 October 2008.

== Early life ==
David and his brother Loga were exposed to music-making through their mother, radio announcer and Carnatic classical singer, who would often bring them along to her performance sessions; particularly in town halls. Such experiences instilled a strong passion in him to play music at a very young age. He often played truant in school to do rehearsals with a band that he performed with his friends, and he eventually quit school at the age of 17 because "history and geography was not helping me in my music."

== Honours ==
- Malaysia
  - Companion of the Order of Loyalty to the Crown of Malaysia (JSM) (2008)
- Pahang
  - Knight Companion of the Order of the Crown of Pahang (DIMP) – Dato' (2008)

== Discography ==
Terima Kasih ("Thank You") (6455 505)

- Released: 1979
- Format: Record, cassette
- Label: Philips Polygram Records
- Singles: Terima Kasih, Jika Kau Bercinta Lagi

Penyanyi ("The Singer") (6444 509)

- Released: 1979
- Format: Record, cassette
- Label: Philips Polygram Records
- Singles: Cahaya Keinsafan

Dapatkah ("Could ...?") (6345 125)

- Released: 1980
- Format: Record, cassette
- Label: Philips Polygram Records

The Alleycats – Kuching ("cat") (6345 146)

- Released: 1981
- Label: Philips Polygram Records
- Singles: Andainya Aku Pergi Dulu, Gerimis Senja, Sekuntum Mawar Merah Sebuah Puisi

Alleycats 4 (6345 136)

- Released: 1981
- Label: Philips Polygram Records
- Singles: Kisah Kau Dan Aku, Hingga Akhir Nanti

Alleycats – 6 Kuching ("Six Cats") (6345 158)

- Released: 1982
- Label: Philips Polygram Records

Alleycats 7 (812276-1)

- Released: 1983
- Label: Philips Polygram Records

Drama Kehidupan ("Life Drama") (818579-1)

- Released: 1984
- Label: Philips Polygram Records

Kerana ("Because") (824158-4)

- Released: 1984
- Format: cassette
- Label: Philips Polygrame Records

Suara Kekasih ("Voice of Lover") (824 863-1)

- Released: 1985
- Label: Philips Polygrame Records

Sampaikan Salam ("Send My Regards") (826841-1)

- Released: 1986
- Label: Philips Polygrame Records

Alleycats 12 (830823-1)

- Released: 1986
- Label: Philips Polygram Records

Aku Kerinduan ("I'm Missing Someone") (834 029-4)

- Released: 1987
- Label: Philips Polygram Records

Suatu Pengertian ("An Understanding")

- Released: 1988
- Label: Philips Polygram Records
- Producer: Eric Yeo

Tetap Merindu

- Released: 1989
- Label: Philips Polygram Records
- Producer: Eric Yeo

Dilema Sekuntum Cinta

- Released: 1989
- Label: Philips Polygram Records
- Producer: Eric Yeo

C.I.N.T.A.

- Released: 1990
- Label: Philips Polygram Records
- Producer: Eric Yeoh

Selagi Tangis Belum Berakhir

- Released: 1991
- Label: Philips Polygram Records
- Producer: Eric Yeo & Alleycats

Untukmu

- Released: 1992
- Label: Philips Polygram Records
- Producer: The Alleycats & Aman

Alleycats 20

- Released: 1993
- Label: Philips Polygram Records
- Producer: Eric Yeoh & The Alleycats

Alleycats 21

- Released: 1996
- Label: Philips Polygram Records
- Producer: Razman

Alleycats 22

- Released: 1997
- Label: Philips Polygram Records
- Producer: Razman

Kucing Lorong

- Released: 1998
- Label: Philips Polygram Records
- Producer: Eric Yeoh

Alleycats 2001

- Released: 2000
- Label: Universal Music
- Producer: M. Nasir

Interpretasi

- Released: 2002
- Label: Universal Music
- Producer: Bell

Tangga-Tangga Ke Pintu Bahagia

- Released: 2004
- Format: CD
- Label: Universal Music
- Producer: Boon Tan & M. Nasir

Rasa

- Released: 2006
- Label: Universal Music
- Producer: Eddy Marzuki & Adnan Abu Hassan

== Filmography ==
=== Film ===
Year	Title	Role	Notes
2010	Estet	Himself	
2011	Nasi Lemak 2.0	Curry Master	
2012	Hantu Gangster	Arulkumar	
2013	Banglasia	Raja Luk Luk	
2021	Budak Kripto	Himself	
2022	Nasi Lemak 1.0	Curry Master	
2024	Baik Punya Ah Long	Kumar Kodiaq	
