= Alleycats (Malaysian band) =

Malaysian pop band

- Alleycats logo

Background information
- Origin: Penang, Malaysia
- Genres: Rock; Progressive Rock; Funky adult contemporary
- Years active: 1969–present
- Labels: Polygram, Universal
- Members: David Arumugam (vocals); Boy @ David John (drums); Din @ Nazaruddin Abdullah (guitar); Mike @ Prawing Aroonratana (keyboards); Jimmy@ Loh Kum Swee (bass) ramesh (guitarist)

The Alleycats is a Malaysian rock band which was formed in 1969, and gained popularity in the late 1970s. It consists of musicians from Penang who were popular in their home state earlier on in their career.

== History ==
There were earlier line-ups of this band but the original line-up mentioned were the ones that took the Alleycats to great height of achievements musically. The Alleycats was always on top of the musical scene in Malaysia even before it was signed up as a recording band.

This line-up secured a performance contract in the Mocambo Club situated in Central, a business sector on Hong Kong island in 1976. It was supposed to be a three-month contract but the band's success in wooing the crowd earned it three yearly contracts bundled with TV and concert appearances as means of promoting the band. It became a hit with the locals in Hong Kong. It was not until it left Hong Kong to start a new performance contract in Singapore that the band was spotted by major recording companies.

The Alleycats started out in 1978 by signing a contract with Polygram Records-Philips to produce an album. It went to Hong Kong to record its album in Dragon Studio. Later, Lion Studio in Singapore was responsible for mastering the Alleycats' albums. Its first released album was Terima Kasih (Thank You) which featured cover songs of R&B hits from the Anglosphere, but also had originals like their first single Senandung Semalam (lit. 'Yesterday's Serenade'). Their 1990 album C.I.N.T.A. represented a departure from pop music into rock.

The existence of this band was significant to the Malaysian music industry. With more than twenty recordings, it had contributed to the development of the Malaysian music industry and is still regarded as one of the most influential Malaysian pop music bands of all time in the country. Despite the changes, this band is still active in performing and recording. The Alleycats have a significant fanbase in Malaysia, Indonesia, and Singapore.

== Band members ==
=== Current members ===
- David Arumugam - vocals (1969–present)
- Glenville Charles Salay - vocals
- Priyadashini Loganathan (also known as Dasha Loga) - vocals
- David John - drums
- Nazaruddin Abdullah - lead guitar
- Loh Kum Swee (also known as Jimmy Loh) - bass
- Eddy Zachariah - keyboards

=== Former members ===
- Loganathan Arumugam - vocals (1969–2007); died 2007
- Tan Chin Hock - drums
- Shunmugam Arumugam - lead guitar
- Chester Anthony Passerella - saxophone
- Khoo Fook Sin and Grenville Pereira (Gren) - keyboards
- Frank Ong - bass guitar
- Ramesh - lead guitar

Their music is said to be influenced by Air Supply, Phil Collins, Bee Gees, Billy Joel, David Gates & Bread, Santana and Paul McCartney.

Most of the Alleycats albums were produced by Eric Yeo. Most of its hit songs were penned by music supremo M. Nasir with the lyrics composed by S.Amin Shahab. The M. Nasir/S.Amin combination were most noticeable on hit songs such as Hingga Akhir Nanti (Till The End), Andai Aku Pergi Dulu (If I Go Before You), Sekuntum Mawar Merah Sebuah Puisi (A Red Rose And A Poem), Setahun Sudah Berlalu (A Year Has Passed), Seribu Bintang (A Thousand Stars), Nota Terakhir (This Last Note).

On 27 December 2019, former bass player Frank Ong died of lung cancer aged 54.

== Death of Loganathan ==
Loganathan Arumugam, a vocalist of the Alleycats, died on 4 June 2007 8-months after being diagnosed with lung cancer. His death was deeply mourned by Alleycats fans as reported in the press and media.

An Alleycats Music Video Competition, held as a tribute to the late Loganathan Arumugam of Alleycats was conducted between 25 June 2006 – 25 July 2007. This was jointly organised by NGT Solutions (M) Sdn Bhd and Universal Music Malaysia, with the support from Multimedia Development Corporation (MDeC). It was in line with the government's initiative in encouraging contentpreneurs to develop local content and to be able to identify creativity in the minds of Malaysians.

A year after the loss of Loga to lung cancer, the Alleycats was the lead artiste in a concert organised by the Lung Foundation of Malaysia (LFM) to raise money for its activities. Established in November 2005, LFM is a non-profit Foundation geared towards offering support for patients afflicted with lung diseases to enable them to lead a better quality lifestyle with minimal suffering.

== Discography ==
Terima Kasih ("Thank You") (6455 505)

- Released: 1979
- Format: Record, cassette
- Singles: Terima Kasih, Jika Kau Bercinta Lagi

Penyanyi ("The Singer") (6444 509)

- Released: 1979
- Format: Record, cassette
- Singles: Cahaya Keinsafan

Dapatkah ("Could ...?") (6345 125)

- Released: 1980
- Format: Record, cassette

The Alleycats – Kuching ("cat") (6345 146)

- Released: 1981
- Singles: Andainya Aku Pergi Dulu, Gerimis Senja, Sekuntum Mawar Merah Sebuah Puisi

Alleycats 4 (6345 136)

- Released: 1981
- Singles: Kisah Kau Dan Aku, Hingga Akhir Nanti

Alleycats – 6 Kuching ("Six Cats") (6345 158)

- Released: 1982

Alleycats 7 (812276-1)

- Released: 1983

Drama Kehidupan ("Life Drama") (818579-1)

- Released: 1984

Kerana ("Because") (824158-4)

- Released: 1984
- Format: cassette

Suara Kekasih ("Voice of Lover") (824 863-1)

- Released: 1985

Sampaikan Salam ("Send My Regards") (826841-1)

- Released: 1986

Alleycats 12 (830823-1)

- Released: 1986

Aku Kerinduan ("I'm Missing Someone") (834 029-4)

- Released: 1987

Suatu Pengertian ("An Understanding")

- Released: 1988
- Producer: Eric Yeo

Tetap Merindu

- Released: 1989
- Producer: Eric Yeo

Dilema Sekuntum Cinta

- Released: 1989
- Producer: Eric Yeo

C.I.N.T.A.

- Released: 1990
- Producer: Eric Yeoh

Selagi Tangis Belum Berakhir

- Released: 1991
- Producer: Eric Yeo & Alleycats

Untukmu

- Released: 1992
- Producer: The Alleycats & Aman

Alleycats 20

- Released: 1993
- Producer: Eric Yeoh & The Alleycats

Alleycats 21

- Released: 1996
- Producer: Razman

Alleycats 22

- Released: 1997
- Producer: Razman

Kucing Lorong

- Released: 1998
- Producer: Eric Yeoh

Alleycats 2001

- Released: 2000
- Producer: M. Nasir

Interpretasi

- Released: 2002
- Producer: Bell

Tangga-Tangga Ke Pintu Bahagia

- Released: 2004
- Format: CD
- Producer: BOON TAN & M.NASIR

Rasa

- Released: 2006
- Producer: Eddy Marzuki & Adnan Abu Hassan
